= Amy Shark discography =

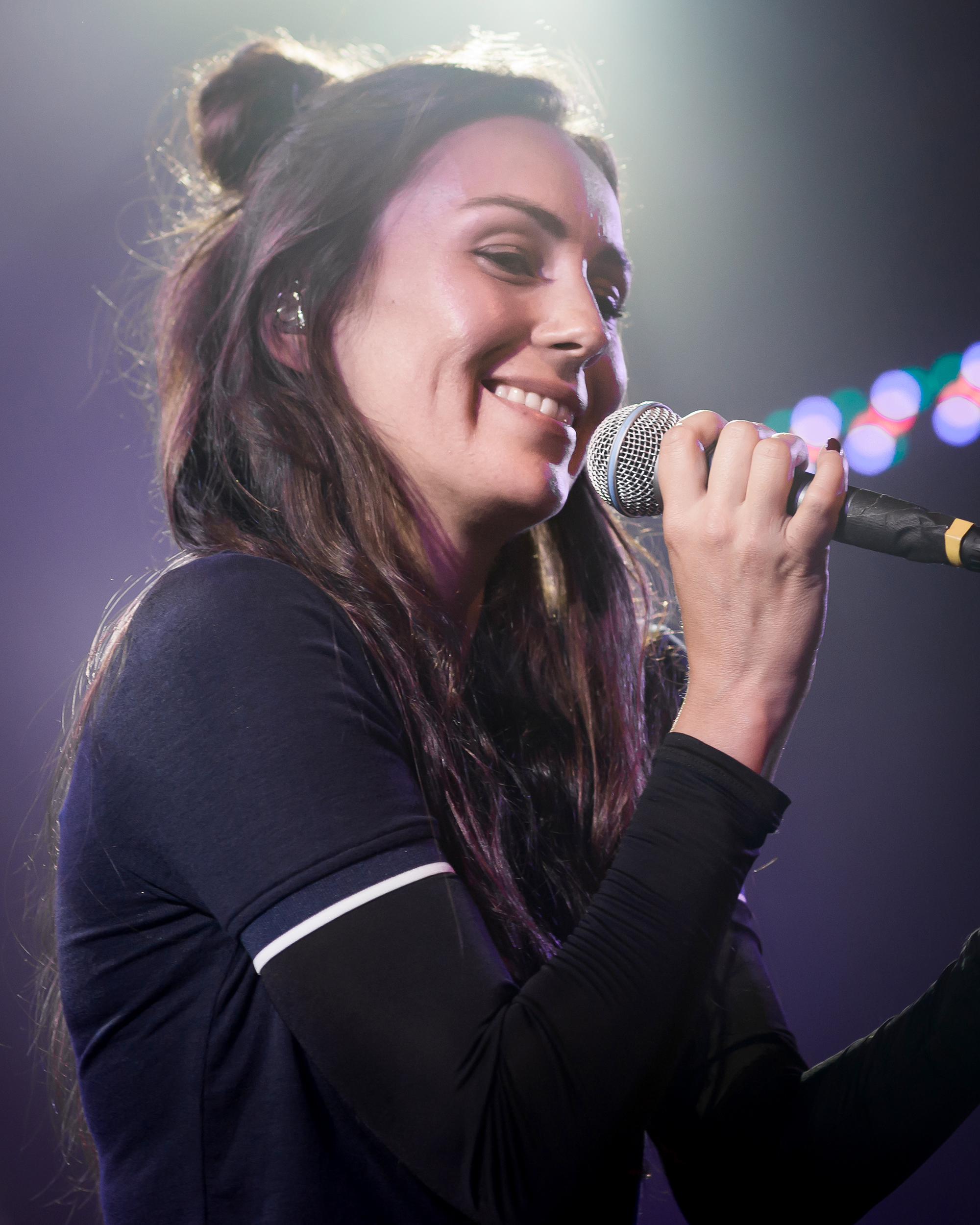
- Shark performing in Los Angeles, February 2018
- Studio albums: 5
- EPs: 5
- Singles: 34

The discography of Australian indie pop singer, Amy Shark consists of five studio albums (including one as Amy Cushway), five extended plays and thirty-four singles. It includes releases by the artist under the names, Amy Cushway and by Little Sleeper.

== Studio albums ==
List of studio albums, with release date, label, selected chart positions and certifications shown
Title	Details	Peak chart positions					Certifications
Title	Details	AUS	NZ	SWI	UK DL.	US Heat.	Certifications
It's a Happy City (by Amy Cushway)	Released: 2012	—	—	—	—	—	
Love Monster	Released: 13 July 2018; Label: Wonderlick, Sony (LICK021); Format: CD, LP, digital download, streaming	1	7	34	60	2	ARIA: Platinum; RMNZ: Gold
Cry Forever	Released: 30 April 2021; Label: Wonderlick, Sony (LICK041); Format: CD, LP, digital download, streaming	1	15	67	44	—	
Sunday Sadness	Released: 9 August 2024; Label: Sony (19802810432); Format: CD, LP, digital download, streaming	1	28	—	—	—	
Soft Pop	Released: 24 July 2026; Label: Wonderlick, Sony (LICK067-LICK070); Format: CD, LP, digital download, streaming	2	—	—	—	—	

== Extended plays ==
List of EPs, with release date, label, and selected chart positions shown
Title	Details	Peak chart positions		
Title	Details	AUS	NZ Heat.	US Heat.
I Thought of You Out Loud (by Amy Cushway, discontinued)	Released: mid-2008	—	—	—
Love's Not Anorexic (by Amy Cushway, discontinued)	Released: 2009	—	—	—
Broadway Gossip (by Amy Cushway, discontinued)	Released: 15 September 2010; Label: Independent	—	—	—
Nelson	Released: 19 February 2014	—	—	—
Night Thinker	Released: 21 April 2017; Label: Wonderlick, Sony (LICK019); Format: CD, LP, digital download, streaming	2	1	8

== Singles ==
=== As lead artist ===
List of singles, with year released, selected chart positions and certifications, and album name shown
Title	Year	Peak chart positions						Certifications	Album
Title	Year	AUS	NZ Heat.	NZ Hot	US Alt.	US AAA	US Adult	Certifications	Album
"Spits on Girls"	2014	—	—	—	—	—	—		Non-album singles
"Golden Fleece" (as Little Sleeper)	2015	—	—	—	—	—	—		Non-album singles
"Adore"	2016	3	8	—	32	17	—	ARIA: 5× Platinum; RMNZ: Platinum	Night Thinker
"Weekends"	2017	59	10	—	—	—	—	ARIA: Platinum	Night Thinker
"Drive You Mad"	2017	— (Note: "Drive You Mad" did not enter the ARIA Top 100 Singles Chart, but peaked at number 15 on the Australian Artists Singles Chart.)	—	—	—	—	—		Night Thinker
"I Said Hi"	2018	6	8	14	—	38	34	ARIA: 5× Platinum; RMNZ: Platinum	Love Monster
"Don't Turn Around"	2018	— (Note: "Don't Turn Around" did not enter the ARIA Top 100 Singles Chart, but peaked at number 16 on the Australian Artists Singles Chart.)	10	—	—	—	—		Love Monster
"Psycho" (featuring Mark Hoppus)	2018	— (Note: "Psycho" did not enter the ARIA Top 100 Singles Chart, but peaked at number 14 on the Australian Artists Singles Chart.)	—	—	—	—	—	ARIA: Gold	Love Monster
"All Loved Up"	2018	58	—	35	—	—	—	ARIA: Platinum	Love Monster
"Mess Her Up"	2019	29	—	—	—	—	—	ARIA: 2× Platinum	Love Monster
"Everybody Rise"	2020	31	—	25	—	28	—	ARIA: Platinum	Cry Forever
"C'mon" (featuring Travis Barker)	2020	56	—	22	—	—	—		Cry Forever
"All the Lies About Me"	2020	—	—	—	—	—	—		Cry Forever
"Love Songs Ain't for Us" (featuring Keith Urban)	2021	22	—	11	—	—	—	ARIA: Platinum	Cry Forever
"Baby Steps"	2021	—	—	—	—	—	—		Cry Forever
"Amy Shark"	2021	—	—	39	—	—	—		Cry Forever
"Worst Day of My Life"	2021	—	—	28	—	—	—		Cry Forever
"Sugar, We're Goin Down" (Like a version) (RSD 7" exclusive)	2022	—	—	—	—	—	—		Non-album singles
"Sway My Way" (with R3hab)	2022	25	—	22	—	—	—	ARIA: Platinum	Non-album singles
"Only Wanna Be with You"	2022	—	—	12	—	—	—		Non-album singles
"High on You" (with Sam Fischer)	2023	—	—	—	—	—	—		I Love You, Please Don't Hate Me
"Can I Shower at Yours"	2023	—	—	—	—	—	—		Sunday Sadness
"Christmas Lights"	2023	—	—	—	—	—	—		Non-album single
"Can't Get You Out of My Head"	2023	—	—	—	—	—	—		Mushroom: Fifty Years of Making Noise
"Beautiful Eyes"	2024	—	—	—	—	—	—		Sunday Sadness
"Loving Me Lover"	2024	—	—	—	—	—	—		Sunday Sadness
"Two Friends"	2024	—	—	—	—	—	—		Sunday Sadness
"My Only Friend" (with Tom DeLonge)	2024	—	—	—	—	—	—		Sunday Sadness
"The Biggest Dick"	2026	— (Note: "The Biggest Dick" did not enter the ARIA top 100, but peaked at number 6 on the Australian Artist Singles Chart.)	—	—	—	—	—		Soft Pop
"Our Last Fight"	2026	—	—	—	—	—	—		Soft Pop
"Child of Divorce"	2026	—	—	—	—	—	—		Soft Pop
"It's Kinda Hot"	2026	—	—	—	—	—	—		Soft Pop
"Movies"	2026	—	—	—	—	—	—		Soft Pop
"—" denotes items which were not released in that country or failed to chart.

=== As featured artist ===
Title	Year	Peak chart positions		Certifications	Album
Title	Year	AUS	NZ Hot	Certifications	Album
"The Reaper" (The Chainsmokers featuring Amy Shark)	2019	47	13	ARIA: Platinum	World War Joy
"I'm Not Giving Up" (Indyanna Baby featuring Amy Shark)	2021	—	—		

=== Promotional singles ===
Title	Year	Album
"Be Alright" (Triple J Like a Version)	2019	Like a Version: Volume Fifteen

== Other certified songs ==
Title	Year	Certifications	Album
"Blood Brothers"	2017	ARIA: Gold	Night Thinker

== Songwriting credits ==
List of songwriting credits, with lead artists and album name shown
Title	Year	Album
"November" (Super Cruel featuring Lisa Mitchell)	2017	Non-album single
