= The 1s and 2s: The Best of Buddy Goode =

The #1s and #2s: The Best of Buddy Goode

Compilation album by Buddy Goode
- Released: August 1, 2014
- Length: 1:02:26
- Label: Goode Times Music, ABC Music

Buddy Goode chronology
| It's a Buddy Goode Christmas (2013) | The #1s and #2s: The Best of Buddy Goode (2014) | Songs to Ruin Every Occasion (2015) |

The #1s and #2s: The Best of Buddy Goode is the first compilation album by Michael Carr's comedy character Buddy Goode. It was officially released both digitally and on CD in stores on 1 August 2014.

The album contains a selection of tracks from Goode's first four studio album — It's All Goode, The One and Only Buddy Goode, Unappropriate and It's a Buddy Goode Christmas. In addition to these previously released tracks, two previously unreleased bonus tracks were included—"Bro Country" and "I Just Let One Go".

== Track listing ==
| No. | Title | Length |
|---|---|---|
| 1. | "Dickins Cider" | 2:17 |
| 2. | "Number Two" | 2:55 |
| 3. | "Cougarville" | 2:48 |
| 4. | "Don't Go Swimmin'" | 2:49 |
| 5. | "Carol's" | 2:57 |
| 6. | "Jimmy Likes Dick" | 2:25 |
| 7. | "Unforgiving Wind" | 2:53 |
| 8. | "Baby They're Burning" | 2:11 |
| 9. | "You Should Have Seen Her Box" | 2:39 |
| 10. | "Dine at the Y" | 3:06 |
| 11. | "Country Member" | 3:10 |
| 12. | "Why Don't You Love Me Anymore?" | 3:14 |
| 13. | "One Night in a Bangkok Bar" | 3:48 |
| 14. | "She Blows Upon Me Flute" | 1:57 |
| 15. | "G String" | 2:07 |
| 16. | "Back in the Bush" | 1:55 |
| 17. | "You Ain't Mine" | 3:47 |
| 18. | "Joseph" | 2:21 |
| 19. | "Friend in Jesus" | 3:21 |
| 20. | "Dutchy in the Morning" | 4:06 |
| 21. | "Bro Country" (bonus track) | 2:13 |
| 22. | "I Just Let One Go" (bonus track) | 3:15 |
