= My Only Friend =

My Only Friend' may refer to:

- "My Only Friend", a song by Amy Shark from Sunday Sadness, 2024
- "My Only Friend", a song by the Magnetic Fields from 69 Love Songs, 1999
- "My Only Friend", a song by Oliver Tree from Love You Madly Hate You Badly, 2026
