= 2017 ARIA Music Awards =

Annual Australian music awards

- Date: 28 November 2017
- Venue: Star Event Centre, Sydney, New South Wales

Highlights
- Most wins: Gang of Youths (4); Paul Kelly (4)
- Most nominations: Gang of Youths (8)
- Website: ariaawards.com.au

Television/radio coverage
- Network: Nine Network

The 31st Annual Australian Recording Industry Association Music Awards (generally known as the ARIA Music Awards or simply the ARIAs) are a series of award ceremonies which include the 2017 ARIA Artisan Awards, ARIA Hall of Fame Awards, ARIA Fine Arts Awards and the ARIA Awards. The ARIA Awards ceremony was held on 28 November 2017 and was broadcast from the Star Event Centre, Sydney around Australia on the Nine Network. The Nine Network last broadcast the awards in 2013.

Final nominees were announced on 10 October 2017 at the Art Gallery of New South Wales. ARIA also held the award ceremonies for both Artisan Awards winners and Fine Arts Awards winners at that time. Gang of Youths won four of eight nominations, while Paul Kelly won four from seven. The ARIA Awards ceremony introduced a new category: ARIA Music Teacher of the Year Award, which is publicly voted. The category is open to any teacher working in a school, kindergarten, early childhood centre, youth centre or private tuition music school running a music program around the country. Daryl Braithwaite was inducted into the Hall of Fame as a solo artist; his band, Sherbet, was admitted in 1990.

== Performers ==
ARIA listed the line-up of performers for the ceremony:

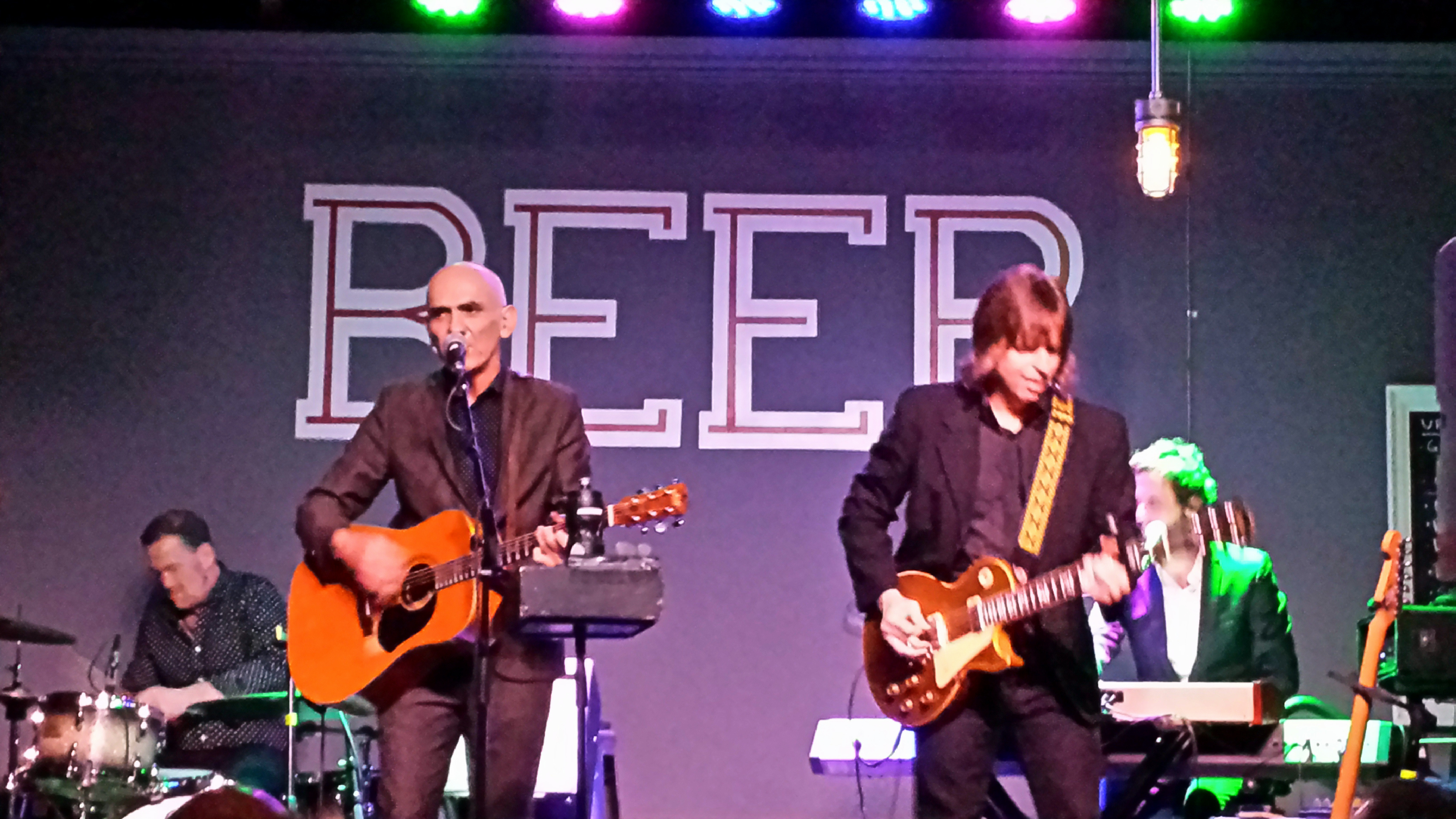
Paul Kelly, (second from left, taken in September 2017), who won four trophies from seven nominations.

Artist(s)	Song(s)
Pnau	"Chameleon"
Amy Shark	"Adore"
Lorde	"Liability" "Green Light"
Gang of Youths	"What Can I Do If the Fire Goes Out?"
Paul Kelly; A.B. Original; Dan Sultan	"Dumb Things"
Jessica Mauboy; Peking Duk	"Fallin'" "Stranger"
Harry Styles	"Kiwi"
Daryl Braithwaite; Guy Sebastian; Vera Blue	"The Horses"
Jimmy Barnes	"High Voltage"

== ARIA Hall of Fame inductee ==
2017 ARIA Hall of Fame inductee
Daryl Braithwaite, 2009

The following artist was inducted into the ARIA Hall of Fame:

- Daryl Braithwaite – Braithwaite was previously inducted as a member of Sherbet in 1990.

== Nominees and winners ==
=== ARIA Awards ===
Winners are listed first and highlighted in boldface; other final nominees are listed alphabetically by artists' first name.

Album of the Year	Best Group
**Gang of Youths** – **Go Farther in Lightness (Mosy Recordings/Sony Music)**; A.B. Original – Reclaim Australia (Golden Era Records/Universal Music Australia); Amy Shark – Night Thinker (Wonderlick Recording Company); Illy – Two Degrees (ONETWO/Warner Music Australia); Paul Kelly – Life Is Fine (EMI)	**Gang of Youths** – **Go Farther in Lightness (Mosy Recordings/Sony Music)**; A.B. Original – Reclaim Australia (Golden Era Records/Universal Music Australia); King Gizzard & the Lizard Wizard – Flying Microtonal Banana (Flightless Records/Remote Control Records/Inertia Music); Nick Cave & the Bad Seeds – Skeleton Tree (Bad Seed Ltd/Kobalt Music Recordings); Peking Duk – "Stranger" (featuring Elliphant) (Sony Music Australia)
Best Male Artist	Best Female Artist
**Paul Kelly** – **Life Is Fine (EMI)**; D.D Dumbo – Utopia Defeated (Liberation Music); Dan Sultan – Killer (Liberation Music); Illy – Two Degrees (ONETWO/Warner Music Australia); Vance Joy – "Lay It on Me" (Liberation Music)	**Sia** – "**The Greatest" (featuring Kendrick Lamar) (Inertia Music)**; Amy Shark – Night Thinker (Wonderlick Recording Company); Jessica Mauboy – The Secret Daughter (Songs from the Original TV Series) (Sony Music Australia); Julia Jacklin – Don't Let the Kids Win (Liberation Music); Meg Mac – Low Blows (LittleBIG Man Records/EMI)
Best Adult Contemporary Album	Best Urban Album
**Paul Kelly** – **Life Is Fine (EMI)**; Bernard Fanning – Brutal Dawn (Dew Process); D.D Dumbo – Utopia Defeated (Liberation Music); Nick Cave & the Bad Seeds – Skeleton Tree (Bad Seed Ltd/Kobalt Music Recordings); Pete Murray – Camacho (Sony Music Australia)	**A.B. Original** – **Reclaim Australia (Golden Era Records/Universal Music Australia)**; Illy – Two Degrees (ONETWO/Warner Music Australia); REMI – Divas & Demons (House Of Beige/UNFD); Thundamentals – Everyone We Know (High Depth/Island Records Australia/Universal Music Australia); Tkay Maidza – TKAY (Dew Process)
Best Hard Rock/Heavy Metal Album	Best Rock Album
**Northlane** – **Mesmer (UNFD/Warner Music Australia)**; Airbourne – Breaking Outta Hell (Spinefarm Records/Caroline Australia); Frenzal Rhomb – Hi-Vis High Tea (Caroline Australia); King Gizzard & the Lizard Wizard – Murder of the Universe (Flightless Records/Remote Control Records/Inertia Music); Sleepmakeswaves – Made of Breath Only (Bird's Robe Records/MGM)	**Gang of Youths** – **Go Farther in Lightness (Mosy Recordings/Sony Music Australia)**; Dan Sultan – Killer (Liberation Music); Dune Rats – The Kids Will Know It's Bullshit (Ratbag Records); Polish Club – Alright Already (Double Double/Island Records Australia/Universal Music Australia); The Preatures – Girlhood (Island Records Australia/Universal Music Australia)
Best Blues & Roots Album	Best Country Album
**All Our Exes Live in Texas** – **When We Fall (ABC Music/Universal Music Australia)**; Archie Roach – Let Love Rule (Liberation Music); Busby Marou – Postcards from the Shell House (Warner Music Australia); Paul Kelly & Charlie Owen – Death's Dateless Night (Gawdaggie/Universal Music Australia); Tash Sultana – Notion (Lonely Lands Records/Sony Music Australia)	**Kasey Chambers** – **Dragonfly (Essence Group/Warner Music Australia)**; Lee Kernaghan – The 25th Anniversary Album (ABC Music/Universal Music Australia); O'Shea – 61-615 (Sony Music Australia); Shane Nicholson – Love and Blood (Lost Highway Australia/Universal Music Australia); The McClymonts – Endless (Island Records Australia/Universal Music Australia)
Best Pop Release	Best Dance Release
**Amy Shark** – **Night Thinker (Wonderlick Recording Company)**; Dean Lewis – "Waves" (Island Records Australia/Universal Music Australia); Jessica Mauboy – "Fallin'" (Sony Music Australia); Sia – "The Greatest" (featuring Kendrick Lamar) (Inertia Music); Vera Blue – Perennial (Island Records Australia/Universal Music Australia)	**Pnau** – "**Chameleon" (Etcetc Music)**; Dom Dolla & Torren Foot – "Be Randy" (Club Sweat/Xelon); Jagwar Ma – Every Now & Then (Future Classic); Peking Duk – "Stranger" (featuring Elliphant) (Sony Music Australia); The Kite String Tangle – The Kite String Tangle (Warner Music Australia/Exist Recordings)
Breakthrough Artist	Best Independent Release
**Amy Shark** – **Night Thinker (Wonderlick Recording Company)**; A.B. Original – Reclaim Australia (Golden Era Records/Universal Music Australia); Dean Lewis – "Waves" (Island Records Australia/Universal Music Australia); Tash Sultana – Notion (Lonely Lands Records/Sony Music Australia); Tkay Maidza – TKAY (Dew Process)	**A.B. Original** – **Reclaim Australia (Golden Era Records/Universal Music Australia)**; Dan Sultan – Killer (Liberation Music); Sia – "The Greatest" (featuring Kendrick Lamar) (Inertia Music); Tash Sultana – Notion (Lonely Lands Records/Universal Music Australia); Vance Joy – "Lay It on Me" (Liberation Music)
Best Children's Album
**Jimmy Barnes** – **Och Aye the G'nu (ABC Music/Universal Music Australia)**; Lah-Lah – Having Fun! (Sony Music Australia); Peter Combe – Live It Up (Peter Combe Music/Planet); The Idea of North, Lior & Elena Kats-Chernin – A Piece of Quiet (The Hush Collection, Vol 16) (ABC Music/Universal Music Australia); The Wiggles – The Wiggles Duets (ABC Music/Universal Music Australia)

=== Public voted ===
Song of the Year	Best Video
**Peking Duk** – "**Stranger**" (featuring **Elliphant**) **(Sony Music Australia)**; Amy Shark – "Adore" (Wonderlick Recording Company); Bliss n Eso – "Moments" (featuring Gavin James) (Illusive); Dean Lewis – "Waves" (Island Records Australia/Universal Music Australia); Guy Sebastian – "Set in Stone" (Sony Music Australia); Illy – "Catch 22" (featuring Anne-Marie) (ONETWO/Warner Music Australia); Jessica Mauboy – "Fallin'" (Sony Music Australia); Pnau – "Chameleon" (Etcetc Music); Sia – "The Greatest" (featuring Kendrick Lamar) (Inertia Music); Starley – "Call on Me" (Ryan Riback Remix) (Tinted Records/Universal Music Australia)	**Allan Hardy** and **Tom MacDonald** for **Bliss n Eso** – "**Moments**" (featuring **Gavin James**) **(Illusive)**; Amy Billings for Amy Shark – "Drive You Mad" (Wonderlick Recording Company); Tim White for Client Liaison featuring Tina Arena – "A Foreign Affair" (Dot Dash Recordings/Remote Control Records); Tobias Willis and Zachary Bradtke for Client Liaison – "Off White Limousine" (Dot Dash Recordings); Michael Jones for Dean Lewis – "Waves" (Island Records Australia/Universal Music Australia); Daniel and Jared Daperis for Gang of Youths – "The Deepest Signs, the Frankest Shadows" (Mosy Recordings/Sony Music Australia); Mark Alston for Illy – "You Say When" (featuring Marko Penn) (ONETWO/Warner Music Australia); Emma Tomelty for Jessica Mauboy – "Fallin'" (Sony Music Australia); Danny Cohen for Kirin J. Callinan – "S.A.D" (EMI); Sia and Daniel Askill for Sia – "The Greatest" (featuring Kendrick Lamar) (Inertia Music)
Best Australian Live Act	Best International Artist
**Illy** – **The Two Degrees Tour (ONETWO/Warner Music Australia)**; Client Liaison – Diplomatic Immunity Tour (Dot Dash Recordings/Remote Control Records); Flume – Flume: Australian Tour 2016 (Future Classic); Gang of Youths – Gang of Youths (Mosy Recordings/Sony Music); Jessica Mauboy – All The Hits Live Tour (Sony Music Australia); King Gizzard & the Lizard Wizard – The Lizard Wizard Gizzfest (Flightless Records/Remote Control Records/Inertia Music); Nick Cave and the Bad Seeds – Australia & New Zealand Tour 2017 (Bad Seed Ltd/Kobalt Music Recordings); Peking Duk – Clowntown Tour (Sony Music Australia); Tash Sultana – Tash Sultana AUS/NZ Tour (Lonely Lands Records/Sony Music Australia); Violent Soho – Violent Soho with special guests The Bronx (I OH YOU)	**Harry Styles** – **Harry Styles (Columbia/Sony Music Australia)**; Adele – 25 (XL Recordings/Inertia Music); Bruno Mars – 24K Magic (Atlantic Records/Warner Music Australia); Ed Sheeran – ÷ and Loose Change (Warner Music Australia); Kendrick Lamar – Damn and Untitled Unmastered (Interscope/Universal Music Australia); Lorde – Melodrama (Universal Music International/Universal Music Australia); Metallica – Hardwired... to Self-Destruct (Virgin/EMI); Shawn Mendes – Illuminate (Island Records Australia/Universal Music Australia); The Rolling Stones – Blue & Lonesome (Polydor Records/Universal Music Australia); The Weeknd – Starboy (Universal Music International/Universal Music Australia)
Music Teacher of the Year
**Renee McCarthy** – **Woodcroft College, Morphett Vale SA 5162**; Julie Layt – Crescent Lagoon State School, Rockhampton QLD 4700; Stephen Mcewan – Bellarine Secondary College, Drysdale VIC 3200; Alex Manton – Asquith Girls High School, Asquith NSW 2077

=== Fine Arts Awards ===
Winners are listed first and highlighted in boldface; other final nominees are listed alphabetically by artists' first name.

Best Classical Album
- **Slava Grigoryan – Bach: Cello Suites Volume I (ABC Classics/Universal Music Australia)**
  - Grigoryan Brothers – Songs Without Words (ABC Classics/Universal Music Australia)
  - Jayson Gillham, Melbourne Symphony Orchestra & Benjamin Northey – Medtner: Piano Concerto No 1 / Rachmaninoff: Piano Concerto No 2 (ABC Classics/Universal Music Australia)
  - Kate Miller-Heidke & Sydney Symphony Orchestra – Live at the Sydney Opera House (ABC Music/Universal Music Australia)
  - Tamara-Anna Cislowska – Elena Kats-Chernin: Unsent Love Letters - Meditations on Erik Satie (ABC Classics/Universal Music Australia)
Best Jazz Album
- **James Morrison with BBC Concert Orchestra and Keith Lockhart – The Great American Songbook (ABC Jazz/Universal Music Australia)**
  - Australian Art Orchestra – Water Pushes Sand (Jazzhead/Head Records)
  - James Morrison & James Morrison Academy Jazz Orchestra – James Morrison With His Academy Jazz Orchestra (ABC Jazz/Universal Music Australia)
  - King Gizzard & The Lizard Wizard – Sketches of Brunswick East (Flightless Records/Remote Control Records/Inertia Music)
  - The Vampires – The Vampires meet Lionel Loueke (Earshift/Planet)
Best Original Soundtrack or Musical Theatre Cast Album
- **Nigel Westlake & Sydney Symphony Orchestra, with Joseph Tawadros, Slava Grigoryan & Lior – Ali's Wedding (soundtrack) (ABC Classics/Universal Music Australia)**
  - Australian Cast Recording featuring David Campbell – Dream Lover (Sony Music Australia)
  - Cezary Skubiszewski – Red Dog: True Blue (original soundtrack) (Decca Records/Universal Music Australia)
  - Jessica Mauboy – The Secret Daughter (Songs from the Original TV Series) (Sony Music Australia)
  - Richard Tognetti & Australian Chamber Orchestra – Mountain (ABC Classics/Universal Music Australia)
Best World Music Album
- **Katie Noonan and Karin Schaupp – Songs of the Latin Skies (KIN Music/Universal Music Australia)**
  - Joseph Tawadros – Live at Abbey Road (Independent/Planet)
  - Melbourne Ska Orchestra – Saturn Return (ABC Music/Universal Music Australia)
  - Slava Grigoryan & Australian String Quartet – Migration (ABC Classics/Universal Music Australia)
  - Xylouris White – Black Peak (Caroline Australia)
Best Comedy Release
- **John Clarke – Clarke's Classics (ABC Classics/Universal Music Australia)**
  - Arj Barker – Get In My Head (Universal Pictures Australasia/Universal Sony Pictures Home Entertainment)
  - Buddy Goode – More Rubbish (ABC Music/Universal Music Australia)
  - Kitty Flanagan – Seriously? (Universal Pictures Australasia/Universal Sony Pictures Home Entertainment)
  - Rhys Nicholson – Rhys Nicholson Live at The Eternity Playhouse (Century Entertainment)

=== Artisan Awards ===
Winners are listed first and highlighted in boldface; other final nominees are listed alphabetically by artists' first name.

Producer of the Year
- **Gang of Youths** & **Adrian Breakspear** for **Gang of Youths** – **Go Farther in Lightness (Mosy Recordings/Sony Music Australia)**
  - Daniel Rankine for A.B. Original – Reclaim Australia (Golden Era Records/Universal Music Australia)
  - Tom Iansek for Big Scary – Animal (Pieater/Inertia Music)
  - Oliver Hugh Perry & Fabian Prynn for D.D Dumbo – Utopia Defeated (Liberation Music)
  - Steven Schram & Paul Kelly for Paul Kelly – Life Is Fine (EMI)
Engineer of the Year
- **Steven Schram for Paul Kelly – Life Is Fine (EMI)**
  - Oliver Hugh Perry & Fabian Prynn for D.D Dumbo – Utopia Defeated (Liberation Music)
  - John Castle for Dean Lewis – "Lose My Mind" (Island Records Australia/Universal Music Australia)
  - Adrian Breakspear for Gang of Youths – Go Farther in Lightness (Mosy Recordings/Sony Music Australia)
  - Bob Scott for Kate Miller-Heidke & Sydney Symphony Orchestra – Live at the Sydney Opera House (ABC Music/Universal Music Australia)
Best Cover Art
- **Peter Salmon-Lomas for Paul Kelly – Life Is Fine (EMI)**
  - Lee McConnell for Dune Rats – The Kids Will Know It's Bullshit (Ratbag Records)
  - Nathan Cahyadi for Gang of Youths – Go Farther in Lightness (Mosy Recordings/Sony Music Australia)
  - Nick McKinlay for Julia Jacklin – Don't Let The Kids Win (Liberation Music)
  - Mitchell Storck for Midnight Oil – The Overflow Tank (Sony Music)
