= All Loved Up =

Single by Amy Shark

from the album Love Monster
- Released: 3 August 2018
- Length: 3:30
- Label: Wonderlick Entertainment; Sony Music Australia
- Songwriters: Amy Shark; Jack Antonoff
- Producer: Jack Antonoff

Amy Shark singles chronology
| "Psycho" (2018) | "All Loved Up" (2018) | "Mess Her Up" (2019) |

"All Loved Up" is a song recorded by Australian singer-songwriter Amy Shark. The song was released to radio on 3 August 2018 as the fourth single from Shark's debut studio album Love Monster. "All Loved Up" was the most added song on radio the week following its release. On 21 August 2018, Shark performed an acoustic version on Triple M.

At the APRA Music Awards of 2020, "All Loved Up" was nominated for Most Performed Pop Work of the Year.

== Reception ==
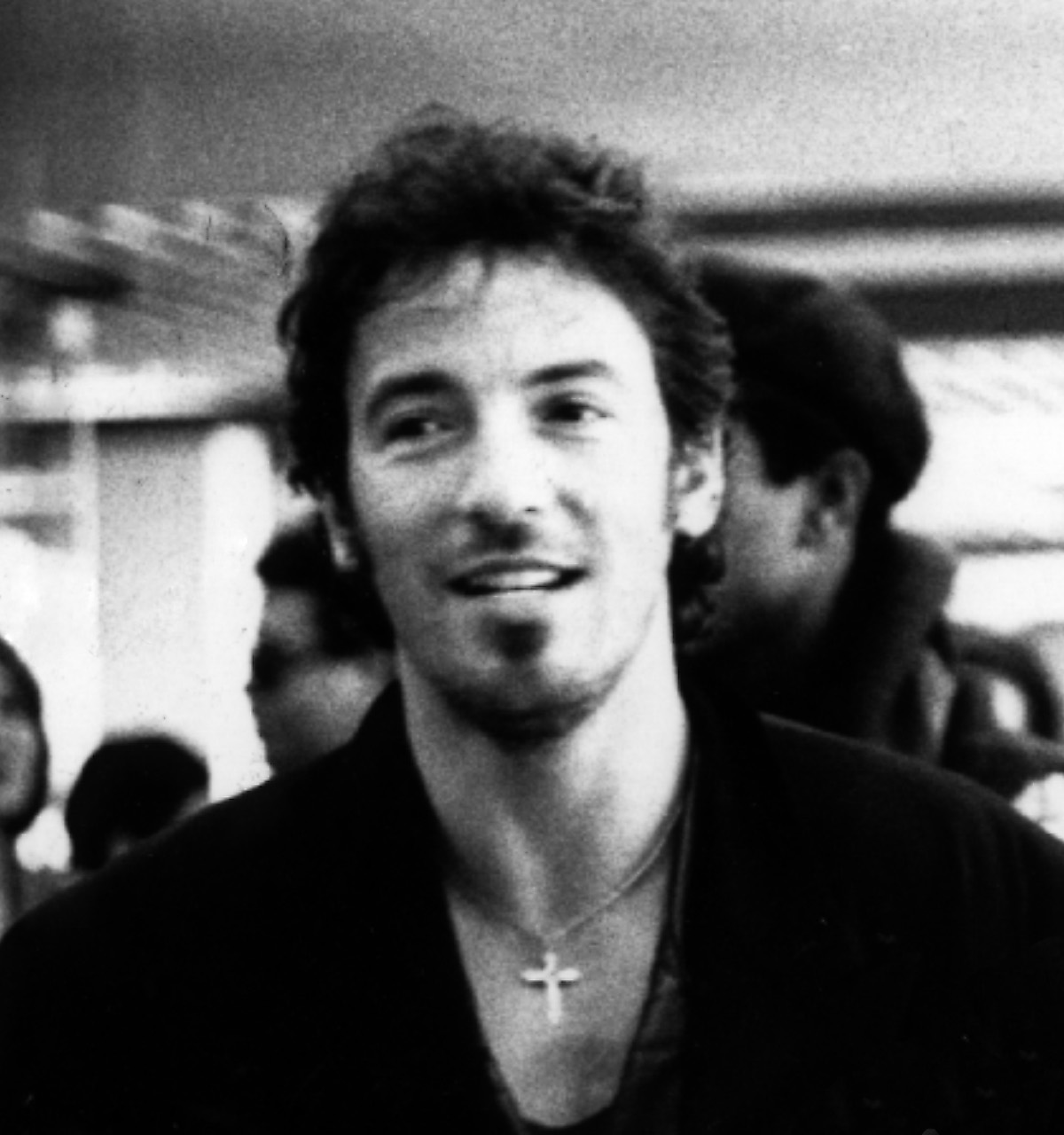
Lyrically, the song has been compared to the work of Bruce Springsteen.

Cameron Adams from the Herald Sun, in an album review said "Jack Antonoff transports Shark into his '80s soundtrack world with "All Loved Up" — it's a Bleachers-style muted banger."

Jonathan Robles from Variance Magazine, in an album review called "All Loved Up" "simply perfect". Adding "It's bursting with that pulsating, windows-down-on-the-freeway energy reminiscent of fellow high-speed cuts such as Taylor Swift's "Out of the Woods", Lorde's "Green Light" and Bleachers' own "Rollercoaster"."

Isabella Trimboli from The Guardian said "All Loved Up" was "a clear standout" and said "[it] bears all the trappings of an Antonoff song: 80s-inspired instrumentation, thudding bass and a soaring, melodic chorus. Lyric-wise, it plays on Bruce Springsteen-reminiscent tropes of small town/big dreams".

== Music video ==
The music video was shot in Los Angeles and was directed by David O'Donohue and produced by Felicity Jayn Heath.

== Track listing ==
1. "All Loved Up" – 3:30

== Charts ==
| Chart (2018) | Peak position |
|---|---|
| Australia (ARIA) | 58 |

== Certifications ==
| Region | Certification | Certified units/sales |
|---|---|---|
| Australia (ARIA) | Platinum | 70,000^{‡} |
^{‡} Sales+streaming figures based on certification alone.

== Release history ==
| Country | Date | Format | Label |
|---|---|---|---|
| Australia | 3 August 2018 | Contemporary hit radio | Wonderlick, Sony Music Australia |
