= C'mon (Amy Shark song) =

Single by Amy Shark featuring Travis Barker

from the album Cry Forever
- Released: 23 October 2020
- Length: 3:40
- Label: Wonderlick Entertainment; Sony Music Australia
- Songwriters: Amy Shark, Travis Barker
- Producers: Dann Hume & M-Phazes

Amy Shark singles chronology
| "Everybody Rise" (2020) | "C'mon" (2020) | "All the Lies About Me" (2020) |

Music video
- "C'mon" on YouTube

"C'mon" is a song recorded by Australian singer-songwriter Amy Shark, featuring American Travis Barker. The song was released digitally on 23 October 2020 as the second single from Shark's forthcoming second studio album, Cry Forever.

The song Premiered on Triple J with Shark saying "The night that I wrote it, I was feeling kind of emo I guess. It just came out so easily, and it felt like a kind of ballad song to me." In a press release, Shark said "It's quite surreal to have the drummer from one of my all-time favourite bands playing on one of my songs. It didn't take much convincing for him [Barker] to jump on board. He genuinely loved the song and took 'C'mon' to another level!"

This is the second single that Shark has worked on with a member of the Californian pop-punk group Blink-182, having teamed up with bassist and vocalist Mark Hoppus for "Psycho" in 2018.

At the APRA Music Awards of 2022, the song was nominated for Most Performed Alternative Work.

== Music video ==
The music video for "C'mon" was directed by James Chappell, produced by Rhys Nicolson and premiered on 22 October 2020. The video sees Shark and Barker performing in a desolate warehouse and there are several shots of Barker being soaked with rain.

== Reception ==
Sose Fuamoli from ABC said the song has "that now-classic Amy Shark sound. Her vocals are strong and impactful, while the lyrics are personal and the images they present, vivid." Fuamoli continued saying, "The arrangement of the track, from the clear and crisp Dann Hume-helmed production, through to Barker's tight percussion, fleshes out the drama of the song without overshadowing Amy's vocal delivery."

Women in Pop said "'C'Mon' is a searingly honest, raw and moving track which explores the highs and lows of being a professional musicians with Shark reaching out for help and forgiveness." They said "Sonically, the song is a swaying, indie pop anthem that starts off with a gentle piano line before Barker's drums kick in and the song builds into a more dramatic track, with Shark's impassioned vocals soar fully encapsulating the emotion of feeling lost and alone in the lyrics."

Alexander Pan from Tone Deaf called the song "an absolute ripper".

Alex Gallagher from Music Feeds called the song "a stunning, slow-burning pop gem" adding "it's also a truly stellar vocal performance from Shark, whose voice soars on the track, featuring some of her most vulnerable and personal songwriting to date."

== Charts ==
Chart performance for "C'mon"
| Chart (2020) | Peak position |
|---|---|
| Australia (ARIA) | 56 |
| New Zealand Hot Singles (RMNZ) | 22 |
