= Buddy Goode =

Fictional character created by Michael Carr

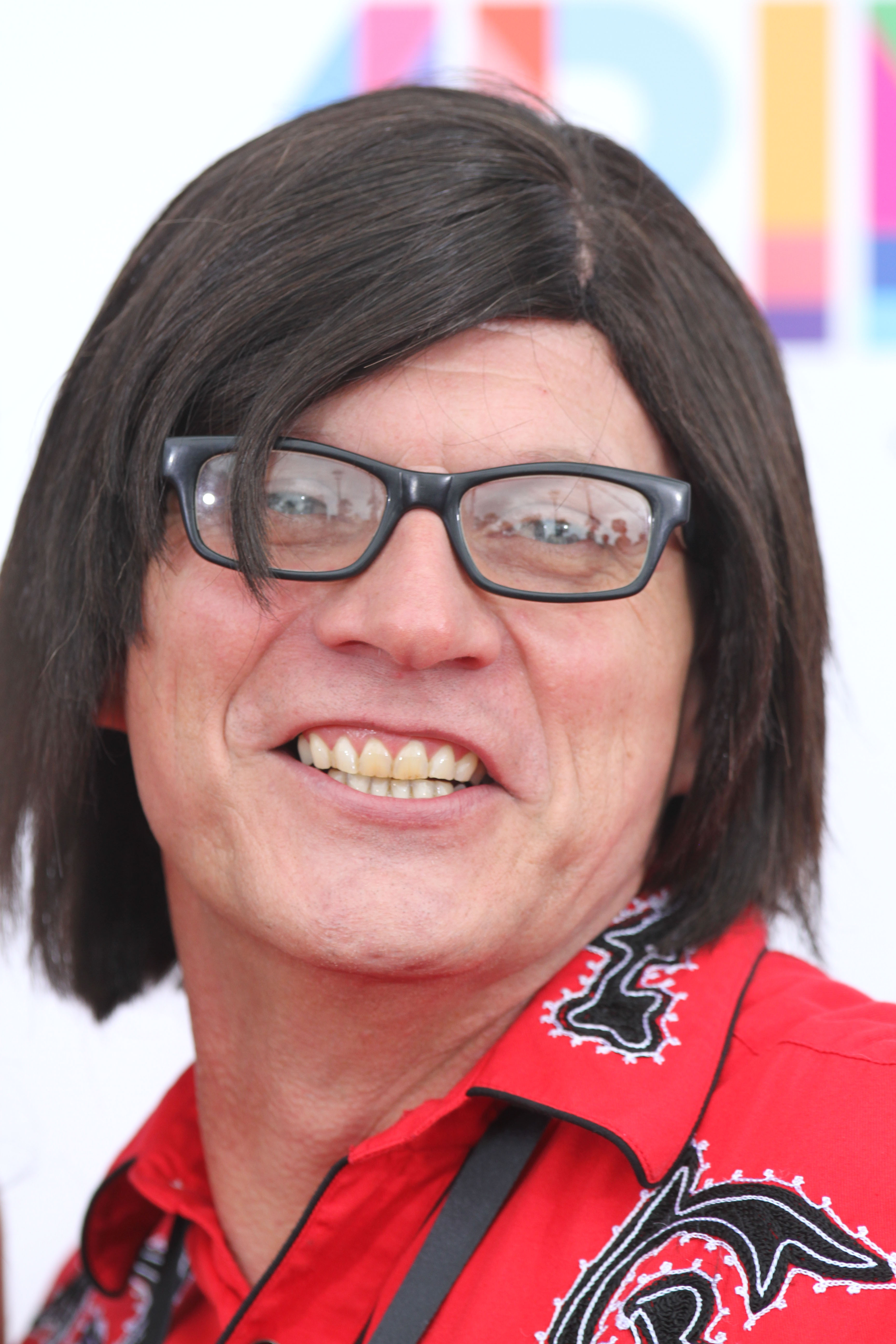
- Buddy Goode at the 2014 ARIA Music Awards
- First appearance: 2007
- Last appearance: Present
- Portrayed by: Michael Carr

Buddy Goode is an ARIA award-winning musical comedy character created by Australian performer and songwriter Michael Carr. Carr portrays Goode by speaking and singing in an American-style accent. The character first appeared in 2007 with the successful single Dutchy In The Morning, and subsequent debut album It's All Goode in 2008 released through ABC Music.

Since 2015, Carr has released five studio albums, and one best of album as Goode, as well as touring extensively throughout Australia.

Carr has been nominated five times for the Best Comedy Release ARIA Award as Goode, winning the prestigious award twice (in 2012 and 2014). He also won the Mo Award for comedy act of the year in 2014, amongst numerous other accolades. Carr is the son of late musician and composer Warren Carr, who was best known for his 20-year stint as a pianist on television's Play School.

More Rubbish, Carr's sixth studio album as Goode, was released on December 16, 2016, and launched at the Rooty Hill RSL the following day.

== Discography ==
List of albums
Title	Album details
It's All Goode	Released: November 2008; Label: Goode Times Music (1784259); Formats: CD, download
The One and Only Buddy Goode	Released: August 2011; Label: Goode Times Music (2780375); Formats: CD, download
Unappropriate	Released: August 2012; Label: Goode Times Music (3711152); Formats: CD, download
It's a Buddy Goode Christmas	Released: November 2013; Label: Goode Times Music (3756924); Formats: CD, download
The #1s and #2s: The Best of Buddy Goode	Released: August 2014; Label: Goode Times Music (3789166); Formats: CD, download
Songs to Ruin Every Occasion	Released: August 2015; Label: Goode Times Music (4743362); Formats: CD, download
More Rubbish	Released: December 2016; Label: Goode Times Music (5728382); Formats: CD, download

== Awards and nominations ==
=== ARIA Music Awards ===
The ARIA Music Awards is an annual awards ceremony held by the Australian Recording Industry Association. They commenced in 1987.

Year	Nominee / work	Award	Result	Ref.
2011	The One And Only Buddy Goode	Best Comedy Release	Nominated	
2012	Unappropriate	Best Comedy Release	Won	
2014	It's A Buddy Goode Christmas	Best Comedy Release	Won	
2015	Songs to Ruin Every Occasion	Best Comedy Release	Nominated	
2017	More Rubbish	Best Comedy Release	Nominated	
