= Drive You Mad =

Single by Amy Shark

from the EP Night Thinker
- Released: 14 July 2017
- Genre: Pop; indie pop
- Length: 3:32
- Label: Wonderlick Entertainment/Sony Music Australia
- Songwriter(s): Amy Shark
- Producer(s): Dann Hume

Amy Shark singles chronology
"Weekends" (2017)	"Drive You Mad" (2017)	"I Said Hi" (2018)

Music video
- "Drive You Mad" on YouTube

"Drive You Mad" is a song recorded by Australian singer-songwriter Amy Shark. It was released on 14 July 2017 as the third and final single from her extended play Night Thinker. Shark said "Drive You Mad" is her favourite song off the EP.

Shark explains the song "It was a realisation I had of me as a person. A bit of me acknowledging to people close to me that I know I'm not easy, I'm not the easiest daughter or friend or wife, I know I'm hard work. Hence the "drive you mad". It's like an ode to them."

In August 2017 Shark explained "I remember the particular day I wrote "Drive You Mad" was a real self-help day. I was looking at myself going, “wow, you’re being a real bitch to everyone,” – you know when you take a real hard look at yourself? There were so many arguments, and one day I was like, “I probably was a bit harsh there... I was just having this big realisation of how [imperfect] I am as a human, and I don’t know, it just sort of came out as "Drive You Mad"."

== Music video ==
The music video for "Drive You Mad" was directed by Shark (a.k.a. Amy Billings) and released on YouTube on 31 July 2018. The clip plays on the theme of being hounded by one's own skeletons, both metaphorically and physically.

At the ARIA Music Awards of 2017 it was nominated for ARIA Award for Best Video for Billings.

== Track listing ==
1. "Drive You Mad" - 3:30

== Charts ==
Chart (2017)	Peak position
Australian Artist (ARIA)	15

== Release history ==
Country	Date	Format	Version	Label	Catalogue
Australia	31 July 2017	Digital download	Original	Wonderlick /Sony Music Australia	G010003702229B
