= Can I Shower at Yours =

Single by Amy Shark

from the album Sunday Sadness
- Released: 22 June 2023
- Length: 1:54; 1:56 (album version)
- Label: Wonderlick; Sony; RCA
- Songwriter: Amy Billings
- Producer: Dann Hume

Amy Shark singles chronology
"High on You" (2023)	"Can I Shower at Yours" (2023)	"Christmas Lights" (2023)

"Can I Shower at Yours" is a song by Australian singer-songwriter Amy Shark. It was produced by Dann Hume, and released on 22 June 2023 as a single after previews on TikTok, including a video parody of the "Pocketful of Sunshine" scene from the film Easy A. It peaked in the Top 10 of the Australian Artist Singles Chart (ARIA) It is the lead single from Shark's third studio album, Sunday Sadness (2024).

Shark described the song "[it] is about that moment in the beginning stages of meeting someone when your mind runs away from you and you let the butterflies in your stomach take over. It's about letting your guard down, looking a little pathetic and giving in to vulnerability." An acoustic version was released on 28 July 2023.

On 30 July 2023, Shark performed the song live at the Logie Awards of 2023 and an acoustic version the following day on Sunrise at the Logies Awards after party. At the 2023 ARIA Music Awards, it was nominated for Best Pop Release and Best Video (directed by Mitch Green).

At the APRA Music Awards of 2024, the song was shortlisted for Song of the Year.

The song was nominated for Best Single at the Rolling Stone Australia Awards.

== Music video ==
The Mitch Green-directed music video was filmed in Sydney on a Google Pixel 7 Pro phone and stars Shark with Lucinda Price and Harry Holland.

== Reception ==
Mary Varvaris from The Music called it a "pop song that’s destined to get in listeners' heads with a hooky pre-chorus and chorus and somehow fits a bridge into its short runtime." Rolling Stone Australia's Poppy Reid declared it is "a welcome injection of turbo-pop" saying, "the single hits different when compared to [Shark]'s musical canon. It's syrupy-pop with an edge; steeped in sticky Len-like brightness with a Cure-esuqe, crisp and danceable guitar line."

== Track listings ==
Digital download/streaming

1. "Can I Shower at Yours" – 1:54

Digital download/streaming

1. "Can I Shower at Yours" (acoustic) – 2:24

== Charts ==
Weekly chart performance for "Can I Shower at Yours"
Chart (2023)	Peak position
Australian Artist Singles (ARIA)	6
