= Don't Turn Around (Amy Shark song) =

Single by Amy Shark

from the album Love Monster
- Released: 8 June 2018
- Genre: Alternative rock; indie pop
- Length: 3:05
- Label: Wonderlick Entertainment/Sony Music Australia
- Songwriter(s): Amy Shark
- Producer(s): Dann Hume

Amy Shark singles chronology
"I Said Hi" (2018)	"Don't Turn Around" (2018)	"Psycho" (2018)

"Don't Turn Around" is a song recorded by Australian singer-songwriter Amy Shark. It was released on 8 June 2018 initially as a pre-order album track, and was later confirmed as the album's second single from her debut studio album Love Monster. In a statement, Shark said: "It's a song that talks about the desire to run into someone you have feelings for, a history with who knows you too well."

== Reception ==
Madelyn Tait from The Music Au, in an album review, called the song "infectious" saying "Shark expresses a desire to run into someone she has feelings for, almost rapping with the vocal rhythms she delivers over strummed guitar during the song's bridge." Cameron Adams from Herald Sun, in an album review said the song was "catchy mellow radio-ready pop."

== Track listing ==
1. "Don't Turn Around" - 3:05

== Charts ==
Chart (2018)	Peak position
Australian Artist (ARIA)	16

== Release history ==
Country	Date	Format	Version	Label	Catalogue
Australia	8 June 2018	Digital download	Original	Wonderlick /Sony Music Australia	
