= Beautiful Eyes (Amy Shark song) =

Single by Amy Shark

from the album Sunday Sadness
- Released: 19 January 2024
- Length: 2:49
- Label: Wonderlick; Sony; RCA
- Songwriter: Amy Billings
- Producer: Jon Hume

Amy Shark singles chronology
"Can't Get You Out of My Head" (2023)	"Beautiful Eyes" (2024)	"Loving Me Lover" (2024)

"Beautiful Eyes" is a song by Australian singer-songwriter Amy Shark. It was produced by Jon Hume, and released on 19 January 2024 as the second single from Shark's third studio album, Sunday Sadness (2024).

In discussing the song, Shark said "I wrote it when I was on tour and I had a lot of time alone to think about the past and the future and my life and all the people in it."

At the 2024 ARIA Music Awards, the Macario de Souza-directed video was nominate for Best Video.

At the Queensland Music Awards, the song won Highest Selling Single.

At the APRA Music Awards of 2025, the song was shorted for Song of the Year. At the 2025 Rolling Stone Australia Awards, the song was shorted for Best Single.
