= It's a Buddy Goode Christmas =

Studio album by Buddy Goode
- Released: November 22, 2013
- Length: 35:36
- Labels: Goode Times Music, ABC Music

Buddy Goode chronology
Unappropriate (2012)	It's a Buddy Goode Christmas (2013)	The #1s and #2s: The Best of Buddy Goode (2014)

It's a Buddy Goode Christmas is the fourth studio album by Michael Carr's comedy character Buddy Goode. It was officially released both digitally and on CD in stores on 22 November 2013.

The album won an ARIA Award in the category of Best Comedy Release at the 2014 ceremony, beating the likes of Chris Lilley's fictional character Ja'mie King, comedy rock band The Beards and stand-up comedian Ronny Chieng.

== Track listing ==
No.	Title	Length
1.	"A Marvellous Time of the Year"	2:46
2.	"The Ginger Bread Man"	2:15
3.	"She Pulls My Bon-Bon"	2:57
4.	"It's Starting to Reindeer"	2:29
5.	"Carol's"	3:00
6.	"Yellow Snow"	2:38
7.	"A New Front Bum"	1:59
8.	"Joseph"	2:24
9.	"Cheeses"	3:17
10.	"Christmas in the Ghetto"	3:08
11.	"Mistletoe Town"	3:05
12.	"Kevin Bloody Wilson's Bike"	2:25
13.	"Too Big for Santa's Knee"	3:41
