= More Rubbish =

Studio album by Buddy Goode
- Released: 16 December 2016
- Length: 29:04
- Label: Goode Times Music, ABC Music

Buddy Goode chronology
Songs to Ruin Every Occasion (2015)	More Rubbish (2016)

More Rubbish is the sixth studio album by Michael Carr's comedy character Buddy Goode. It was released on 16 December 2016 both digitally and on CD.

The album was launched at the Rooty Hill RSL on 17 December 2016.

On 4 October 2017, it was announced that the album had been nominated for the Best Comedy Release category at the 2017 ARIA Awards. However, it lost to John Clarke's album Clarke's Classics.

== Track listing ==
No.	Title	Length
1.	"She Sucks, I Blow"	2:04
2.	"Ink"	2:10
3.	"Camel Toe"	2:13
4.	"Big Man in the Sky"	3:00
5.	"Gay"	1:37
6.	"Heart On"	2:31
7.	"Mid Life Crisis"	1:43
8.	"Like a Bee Gee"	2:21
9.	"Nothing on TV"	2:45
10.	"Mile High Club"	3:00
11.	"Come On, Your Face Is Beautiful"	2:43
12.	"I Believe"	2:52
