= Songs to Ruin Every Occasion =

Studio album by Buddy Goode
- Released: 14 August 2015
- Length: 36:10
- Label: Goode Times Music, ABC Music

Buddy Goode chronology
The #1s and #2s: The Best of Buddy Goode (2014)	Songs to Ruin Every Occasion (2015)	More Rubbish (2016)

Songs to Ruin Every Occasion is the fifth studio album by Michael Carr's comedy character Buddy Goode. It was released on August 14, 2015, both digitally and on CD.

Each song on the album is themed for a different life event or public holiday, such as the NRL Grand Final, Australia Day, the Melbourne Cup, Mother's Day, New Year's Eve and Easter.

On 7 October 2015, it was announced that the album had been nominated for the Best Comedy Release category at the 2015 ARIA Awards. However, it lost to Matt Okine's Live at the Enmore Theatre.

== Track listing ==
No.	Title	Length
1.	"It's Your Birthday (The Birthday Song)"	2:27
2.	"Better Easter Than Jesus (The Easter Song)"	1:58
3.	"Tap 3 Times (The Funeral Song)"	2:16
4.	"I'm Trying (The Wedding/Marriage Song)"	2:44
5.	"Happy Anniversary Baby (The Anniversary Song)"	2:35
6.	"My Pretty Little Valentine (The Valentine's Day Song)"	2:28
7.	"The Race That Stops an Asian (The Melbourne Cup Song)"	2:31
8.	"I Love My Mother (The Mothers Day Song)"	3:07
9.	"Up There Hopoate (The NRL Grand Final Song)"	2:14
10.	"One in a Million (The Fathers Day Song)"	3:04
11.	"Epidural (The Having a Baby Song)"	2:54
12.	"Happy Birthday Australia (The Australia Day Song)"	3:18
13.	"65 (The Retirement Song)"	2:40
14.	"New Year's Resolution (The New Year's Eve Song)"	1:50
