= Night Thinker =

EP by Amy Shark
- Released: 21 April 2017
- Length: 20:50
- Labels: Wonderlick; Sony
- Producers: Dann Hume; Cam Bluff; M-Phazes; Edwin White

Amy Shark chronology
Night Thinker (2017)	Love Monster (2018)

Singles from Night Thinker
- 1. "Adore" Released: 26 July 2016; 2. "Weekends" Released: 17 March 2017; 3. "Drive You Mad" Released: 14 July 2017

Night Thinker is the fifth extended play (EP) by Australian alternative pop singer-songwriter Amy Shark. It was released on 21 April 2017 and peaked at number 2 on the ARIA Albums Chart. At the ARIA Music Awards of 2017, Night Thinker was nominated in four categories, winning Best Pop Release and Breakthrough Artist – Release.

== Background ==
Amy Shark had recorded and performed as Amy Cushway from 2008 to 2012. As Cushway she released two extended plays, I Thought of You Out Loud (2008) and Love's Not Anorexic (2009). By the end of 2013, she started using the stage name, Amy Shark, because Jaws was her favourite film. In February 2014, as Amy Shark, she independently released a five-track extended play, Nelson.

In July 2016, Shark released her next single, "Adore", with co-production by Shark, M-Phazes and Cam Bluff. Shark signed with Wonderlick Entertainment/Sony Music Australia in November 2016. By December of that year, she was no longer using the name Amy Cushway and material under that name had been deleted from her accounts. In March 2017 Shark released "Weekends" followed by her fourth EP, Night Thinker (April), which peaked at number 2 on the ARIA Singles Chart. It included the singles, "Adore", "Weekends" and "Drive You Mad" (July 2017).

== Reception ==
Professional ratings
Review scores
Source	Rating
The Music AU	4/5 stars

Madelyn Tait from The Music AU said "Each song adheres to the tried and tested formula of relatable lyrics, gentle vocals, catchy melodies and simplistic processed beats that has already proved successful for Shark with "Adore" and "Weekends". The appeal of Night Thinker... lies in its strong lyricism and simple production. It's more of the same from Shark, but it works."

Ben Grubb from Project U described the EP as "soothing, full of soul, and uplifting (at times)." Sputnik Music described it as an "intoxicating 20 minutes".

== Track listing ==
No.	Title	Writer(s)	Length
1.	"Drive You Mad"	Amy Louise Billings (p.k.a. Amy Shark)	3:32
2.	"Adore"	Billings; Mark Landon (p.k.a. M-Phazes)	3:05
3.	"Weekends"	Billings	3:10
4.	"Worst Girl" (featuring Allday)	Billings; Thomas Gaynor (p.k.a. Allday)	3:52
5.	"Blood Brothers"	Billings; Blake Malone	3:45
6.	"Deleted"	Billings	3:26

== Charts ==
=== Weekly charts ===
Chart (2017)	Peak position
Australian Albums (ARIA)	2

=== Year-end charts ===
Chart (2017)	Rank
Australian Albums Chart	65
Australian Artist Albums Chart	18

== Release history ==
Country	Date	Format	Label	Catalogue
Australia	21 April 2017	Digital download, CD Vinyl	Wonderlick Entertainment /Sony Music Australia	LICK019 /LICK020
