= Adore (Amy Shark song) =

Single by Amy Shark

from the album Night Thinker and Love Monster
- Released: 26 July 2016
- Recorded: 2016
- Genre: Pop; indie pop
- Length: 3:05
- Label: Wonderlick Entertainment; Sony Music Australia
- Songwriters: Billings; Mark Landon
- Producers: M-Phazes; Cam Bluff

Amy Shark singles chronology
"Golden Fleece" (2016)	"Adore" (2016)	"Weekends" (2017)

Music video
- "Adore" on YouTube

"Adore" is a song written and recorded by Australian singer-songwriter Amy Shark. It was released independently and digitally on 26 July 2016 and re-released in November 2016 after signing with Sony Music Australia. It received heavy airplay on Triple J and quickly gained traction with other more mainstream radio stations in early 2017.

Shark described the track as a tribute to those that are "crushing hard", and ultimately wants to instill confidence in those who feel like they are trapped in a world of emotional turmoil. Speaking to Savage Thrills, Shark said "I wrote it very quickly and the second I threw my headphones on to listen back to what I had recorded through my phone I knew it was special. [it's] just one of those songs that didn't need heaps of words".

"Adore" peaked at number 3 on the ARIA Singles Chart and was certified 4× Platinum.

In January 2017, the song placed second in the Triple J Hottest 100, 2016.

At the ARIA Music Awards of 2017, the song was nominated for Song of the Year. At the APRA Music Awards of 2017 the song was also nominated for Song of the Year, and at the APRA Music Awards of 2018, it won Pop Work of the Year.

In 2018, Shark won the prestigious Vanda & Young Global Songwriting Competition.

At the Queensland Music Awards 2017 "Adore" won Song of the Year, Pop Song of the Year and Regional Song of the Year. At the Queensland Music Awards 2018 "Adore" won Highest Selling Single.

The song was featured as background music in S4E4, "Girl's Night", of the Canadian comedy Schitt's Creek. It is used to emotionally punctuate the scene where Alexis realizes she is still in love with her former boyfriend.

== Music video ==
The music video for "Adore" was released on YouTube on 25 July 2016.

== Reception ==
Tom Vu from aaa Backstage described the track as "brooding " and said "Opening with a beachy guitar riff, the song features soothing synthesisers and a solid beat that nicely caresses Shark's homely vocals. The lyrics are attention grabbing and there's a certain youthful delicacy and cerebral quality in her music that lacks in other pop offerings."

Hannah Maire from Atwood Magazine said "Put simply, 'Adore' possesses a unique, addictive ambiance that demands you to think about your first emotional infatuation." adding "The track could be described as being too linear and anticlimactic, but that’s just the point. A crush, especially one of your first, remains just that – a constant reminder of intense feelings – but also you face the very real, unfortunate dilemma of it going nowhere fast."

== Track listing ==
One-track single

1. "Adore" - 3:05 (US-HM2-16-21431)

Digital remix single

1. "Adore" (Dave Sitek Remix) - 3:13

Digital acoustic

1. "Adore" (acoustic) - 3:10

Digital Piano unplugged

1. "Adore" (acoustic) - 3:17

== Cover versions ==
- In March 2017, Australian post-hardcore band Hellions, covered "Adore" for Triple J's Like a Version.
- Australian Dean Lewis covered the song on his debut extended play Same Kind of Different.
- In January 2018 Paul Dempsey covered the song.
- In April 2018 Dashboard Confessional covered Adore, which left Shark "in tears".
- In September 2023 Australian post-punk act Chiffon Magnifique covered Adore, as part of Brisbane Label 4000 Records' compilation album House Keys Volume 2.

== Charts ==
=== Weekly charts ===
Chart (2016–2018)	Peak position
Australia (ARIA)	3
Canada Rock (Billboard)	32
US Rock & Alternative Airplay (Billboard)	35

=== Year-end charts ===
Chart (2017)	Position
Australia (ARIA)	40
Australian Artist (ARIA)	4

== Certifications ==
Region	Certification	Certified units/sales
Australia (ARIA)	5× Platinum	350,000^{‡}
Canada (Music Canada)	Gold	40,000^{‡}
New Zealand (RMNZ)	Platinum	30,000^{‡}
^{‡} Sales+streaming figures based on certification alone.

== Release history ==
Country	Date	Format	Version	Label
Australia	July 2016	Digital download	Original	Self-released
Australia	4 November 2016	Digital download	Original	Wonderlick /Sony Music Australia
Australia	26 June 2017	Digital download	Dave Sitek remix	Wonderlick / Sony
Australia	13 October 2017	Digital download	Acoustic	Wonderlick / Sony
Australia	24 November 2017	Digital download	Piano Unplugged	Wonderlick / Sony
