= Mess Her Up =

Single by Amy Shark

from the album Love Monster
- Released: 1 March 2019
- Length: 3:25
- Label: Wonderlick Entertainment; Sony Music Australia
- Songwriter(s): Amy Shark
- Producer(s): Dann Hume

Amy Shark singles chronology
"All Loved Up" (2018)	"Mess Her Up" (2019)	"The Reaper" (2019)

"Mess Her Up" is a song recorded by Australian singer-songwriter Amy Shark. The song is about a woman cheating with her best friend's boyfriend and was released digitally on 1 March 2019 as the fifth single from Shark's debut studio album Love Monster.

At the ARIA Music Awards of 2019, the song was nominated for three awards Best Female Artist, Video of the year and Song of the Year.

At the Queensland Music Awards 2020 "Mess Her Up" won Highest Selling Single.

== Music video ==
The music video was released on 28 February 2019. The video was co-directed by David O'Donohue and Shark with a narrative following a complicated love story. Shark said: "It was important for me to be involved in the process as I was the one who came up with the concept of these two worlds that play out through the video. Mess Her Up is a very deep and emotional song and I needed the actors to do it justice." The video was produced by Felicity Jayn Heath and shot in Los Angeles.

== Track listing ==
1. "Mess Her Up" (single edit) – 3:25
2. "Mess Her Up" (acoustic) – 3:30

== Charts ==
=== Weekly charts ===
Chart (2019)	Peak position
Australia (ARIA)	29

=== Year-end charts ===
Chart (2019)	Position
Australia (ARIA)	81
Australian Artist (ARIA)	13

== Certifications ==
Region	Certification	Certified units/sales
Australia (ARIA)	2× Platinum	140,000^{‡}
^{‡} Sales+streaming figures based on certification alone.

== Release history ==
Country	Date	Format	Label
Australia	1 March 2019	Digital download, streaming	Wonderlick, Sony Music Australia
