= Soft Pop =

Studio album by Amy Shark
- Released: 24 July 2026
- Recorded: Wales
- Length: 32:29
- Labels: Amy Shark; Wonderlick; Sony Australia
- Producers: Dann Hume; Amy Shark

Amy Shark chronology
Sunday Sadness (2024)	Soft Pop (2026)

Singles from Soft Pop
- 1. "The Biggest Dick" Released: 11 March 2026; 2. "Our Last Fight" Released: 17 April 2026; 3. "Child of Divorce" Released: 22 May 2026; 4. "It's Kinda Hot" Released: 26 June 2026; 5. "Movies" Released: 11 September 2026

Soft Pop is the fourth studio album by Australian alternative pop singer-songwriter Amy Shark. It was announced on 11 March 2026, alongside the album's lead single. The album was released on 24 July 2026.

The album was written entirely by Shark (performing name of Billings), with no co-writes and no collaborations. The album was recorded in a converted church in Wales with long-time producer Dann Hume.

Upon announcement, Shark said: "I'm so proud of Soft Pop and so excited to share this world with my fans. We created something that feels incredibly special on this album. There's truly something here for everyone, and the process of bringing it to life has been challenging, full of joy and honestly life changing."

At the 2026 ARIA Music Awards, Connor Dewhurst's work was nominated for Best Cover Art.

== Track listing ==
All tracks are written by Amy Billings.

Soft Pop track listing
No.	Title	Length
1.	"The Biggest Dick"	2:43
2.	"It's Kinda Hot"	2:37
3.	"Child of Divorce"	3:24
4.	"Our Last Fight"	3:02
5.	"Movies"	2:58
6.	"Like a Doll"	3:23
7.	"Ruins"	3:00
8.	"Hotel Towels"	2:55
9.	"I Know a Place Just Up the Street"	2:36
10.	"Not Old Enough to Drive"	2:59
11.	"Singapore Noodles"	2:52
Total length:		32:29

== Personnel ==
Credits are adapted from Tidal.

- Amy Shark – vocals, guitar, production
- Dann Hume – production, engineering, mixing
- Leon Zervos – mastering

== Charts ==
Chart performance for Soft Pop
Chart (2026)	Peak position
Australian Albums (ARIA)	2

== Release history ==
Release history and details for Soft Pop
Region	Date	Format	Label	Catalogue
Various	24 July 2026	Digital download; streaming	Amy Shark; Wonderlick Entertainment; Sony Music Australia	Not applicable
Australia	24 July 2026	CD; LP	Amy Shark; Wonderlick Entertainment; Sony Music Australia	LICK067-LICK070
