= Cry Forever =

Studio album by Amy Shark
- Released: 30 April 2021
- Length: 40:32
- Labels: Wonderlick; Sony
- Producers: Amy Shark; M-Phazes; Dann Hume; Joel Little; Sammy Witte; Sam de Jong; Joe Rubel; Jamie Hartman; Dan Wilson; Brad Hosking

Amy Shark chronology
Love Monster (2018)	Cry Forever (2021)	Sunday Sadness (2024)

Singles from Cry Forever
- 1. "Everybody Rise" Released: 18 June 2020; 2. "C'mon" Released: 23 October 2020; 3. "All the Lies About Me" Released: 4 December 2020; 4. "Love Songs Ain't for Us" Released: 19 February 2021; 5. "Baby Steps" Released: 19 March 2021; 6. "Amy Shark" Released: 16 April 2021; 7. "Worst Day of My Life" Released: 18 June 2021

Cry Forever is the second studio album by Australian alternative pop singer-songwriter Amy Shark, released on 30 April 2021 through Wonderlick Entertainment and Sony Music Australia.

Cry Forever achieved minor commercial success, debuting and peaking at number 1 on the ARIA Albums Chart, number 15 on the New Zealand Albums Chart, and number 67 on the Swiss Albums Chart.

At the 2021 ARIA Music Awards, the album was nominated for Album of the Year, Best Artist and Best Pop Release.

At the 2022 Queensland Music Awards, the release won Highest Selling Album of the Year.

== Background and release ==
Cry Forever was announced on 4 December 2020, alongside the album's third single, "All the Lies About Me". Upon the album's announcement, Shark said "I am so proud of this album and it's time to hand these songs over to the fans. These are some of the most personal and confronting songs I've ever written and I can't wait to share them with everyone."

== Promotion ==
In February 2021, Shark announced the forthcoming release of a docu-series titled Forever, Amy Shark, which documents the recording process of the album Cry Forever.

The album was supported by an Australian tour throughout June and July 2021.

=== Singles ===
"Everybody Rise" was released on 18 June 2020 as the album's lead single. The song peaked at number 31 on the ARIA Singles Chart and won the ARIA Award for Best Pop Release at the 2020 ARIA Music Awards.

"C'mon", featuring Blink-182 drummer Travis Barker, was released on 23 October 2020 as the album's second single. It debuted and peaked at number 56 on the ARIA Singles Chart.

"All the Lies About Me" was released on 4 December 2020 as the album's third single. Shark said of the song: "This song is me at my most confused, broken and lonely. It's not easy hearing things about yourself that simply aren't true. Sometimes the noise gets too loud so I had to write this song as it's the only way I can talk."

"Love Songs Ain't for Us", featuring Australian country musician Keith Urban, was released on 19 February 2021 as the album's fourth single. The song was co-written with English singer Ed Sheeran.

"Baby Steps" was released on 19 March 2021 as the album's fifth single.

"Amy Shark" was released on 16 April 2021 as the album's sixth single. Shark said of the song: "This song is my story. In a way this album closes so many chapters for me."

"Worst Day of My Life" was sent to radio on 18 June 2021 as the album's seventh single. The music video, directed by James Chappell premiered the same day.

== Critical reception ==
Professional ratings
Review scores
Source	Rating
Riff Magazine	9/10 stars

Cry Forever received critical acclaim.

Mike DeWald from Riff Magazine said "Few can capture the emotional nuance of loneliness in song quite like Amy Shark...Already a formidable songwriter, Amy Shark has stepped up her game in just about every avenue—from writing to delivery and arrangement."

Sally McMullen from Music Feeds said "Compared to Love Monster, Shark really pulls back on production [which] leaves room for more tender, acoustic moments". McMullen said "Amy Shark is a self-proclaimed perfectionist and Cry Forever is a testament to that. Every riff, lyric and feature has a considered and meaningful place on the record. Although Shark was tempted to leave some of the more revealing songs on the cutting room floor, she decided that honesty was the only option. It's oftentimes confronting and heartbreaking, but her intense confidence shines through the unvarnished and confessional lyrics."

Jeff Jenkins from Stack Magazine said "With its dynamic, contemporary pop, Cry Forever consolidates Shark's position as one of our finest songwriters". Jenkins said "She's not afraid to say exactly what's on her mind, and she's also capable of conveying true emotion in short, simple sentences". Jenkins concluded saying "This album is a giant leap forward. Global stardom awaits."

== Track listing ==
Cry Forever track listing
No.	Title	Writer(s)	Producer(s)	Length
1.	"The Wolves"	Amy Billings	Amy Shark; M-Phazes; Dann Hume	2:52
2.	"Everybody Rise"	Billings; Joel Little	Little	3:10
3.	"Worst Day of My Life"	Billings	Shark; M-Phazes; Hume	3:01
4.	"C'mon" (featuring Travis Barker)	Billings; Travis Barker	Shark; M-Phazes; Hume	3:40
5.	"All the Lies About Me"	Billings; Sammy Witte	Shark; M-Phazes; Witte	2:57
6.	"Miss You"	Billings; Sam de Jong	de Jong	2:56
7.	"Love Songs Ain't for Us" (featuring Keith Urban)	Billings; Edward Sheeran	Shark; M-Phazes; Joe Rubel	3:40
8.	"I'll Be Yours"	Billings; Jamie Hartman	Shark; M-Phazes; Hartman	3:27
9.	"You'll Never Meet Anyone Like Me Again"	Billings; Daniel Dodd Wilson	Shark; Dan Wilson	3:16
10.	"That Girl"	Billings	Shark; Hume	2:27
11.	"Lonely Still"	Billings	Shark; Hume	2:48
12.	"Baby Steps"	Billings	Shark; Hume	3:11
13.	"Amy Shark"	Billings	Shark; Brad Hosking	3:07
Total length:				40:32

== Charts ==
=== Weekly charts ===
Weekly chart performance for Cry Forever
Chart (2021)	Peak position
Australian Albums (ARIA)	1
New Zealand Albums (RMNZ)	15
Swiss Albums (Schweizer Hitparade)	67

=== Year-end charts ===
Year-end chart performance for Cry Forever
Chart (2021)	Position
Australian Albums (ARIA)	34

== Release history ==
Release history and details for Cry Forever
Region	Date	Format	Label	Catalogue	Ref.
Various	30 April 2021	Digital download; streaming	Wonderlick Entertainment	Not applicable	
Australia	30 April 2021	CD	Wonderlick; Sony Australia	LICK041	
Australia	30 April 2021	LP	Wonderlick; Sony Australia	LICK042	
Australia	30 April 2021	LP (JB Hi-Fi exclusive light blue marbled edition)	Wonderlick; Sony Australia	LICK043	
New Zealand	30 April 2021	CD	Wonderlick; Sony	LICK041	
New Zealand	30 April 2021	LP	Wonderlick; Sony	LICK042	
New Zealand	30 April 2021	LP (JB Hi-Fi exclusive light blue marbled edition)	Wonderlick; Sony	LICK043	
