= The One and Only Buddy Goode =

Studio album by Buddy Goode
- Released: August 12, 2011
- Length: 38:49
- Label: Goode Times Music

Buddy Goode chronology
It's All Goode (2008)	The One and Only Buddy Goode (2011)	Unappropriate (2012)

The One and Only Buddy Goode is the second studio album by Michael Carr's comedy character Buddy Goode. It was officially released both digitally and on CD in store on 11 August 2011.

The album was nominated for an ARIA Award in the category of Best Comedy Release at the 2011 ceremony, however was beaten by Australian comedy duo Hamish & Andy's compilation album Celebrating 50 Glorious Years.

On 18 January 2013, the album was re-released into select stores as a double pack with Goode's debut album, It's All Goode.

== Track listing ==
No.	Title	Length
1.	"Jimmy Likes Dick"	2:25
2.	"Unforgiving Wind"	2:53
3.	"Dickens Cider"	2:17
4.	"Stop Makin' That Guy"	2:46
5.	"Baby They're Burning"	2:11
6.	"Cougarville"	2:48
7.	"Why Don't You Love Me Anymore?"	3:14
8.	"Country Member"	3:10
9.	"Doin' It"	2:50
10.	"Threesome"	2:28
11.	"Dine at the Y"	3:06
12.	"Lesbos Belle de La Mer"	2:45
13.	"Cecilia"	2:30
14.	"Blow Me"	3:17
