= Weekends (Amy Shark song) =

Single by Amy Shark

from the EP Night Thinker
- Released: 17 March 2017
- Recorded: 2016
- Genre: Pop; indie pop
- Length: 3:10
- Label: Wonderlick Entertainment/Sony Music Australia
- Producer: Dann Hume

Amy Shark singles chronology
"Adore" (2016)	"Weekends" (2017)	"Drive You Mad" (2017)

Music video
- "Weekends" on YouTube

"Weekends" is a song recorded by Australian singer-songwriter Amy Shark. It was released on 17 March 2017 as the second single from her extended play Night Thinker. "Weekends" peaked at number 59 on the ARIA Singles Chart and was certified platinum.

Shark told Music Feeds “"Weekends" is an extremely personal song” adding “I actually wrote the guitar part about five years ago which sounds crazy, but I couldn’t think of any lyrics good enough to match the guitar so I let it go for so many years, until now!” Shark told Sydney Morning Herald “When I was younger a lot of my time was spent hanging around waiting for people to finish work. They are the best years of your life when you don't have any responsibilities and you just have this shitty part-time job you suck at and you are just waiting until you get to hang out with someone special on the weekend." adding "One of my favourite lines I have ever written is "I call your house phone". It's so outdated now but that was a big deal when you called someone's house phone and you got a little taste of what their home life was like and you spoke to their mum or brother and you were like 'I feel like I am a little bit in now'.”

At the APRA Music Awards of 2018, the song was nominated for Song of the Year.

At the Queensland Music Awards 2018 "Weekends" won Pop Song of the Year and Regional Song of the Year.

== Music video ==
The music video for "Weekends" was filmed at an IGA in Robina, directed by Jude Kalman and released on YouTube on 27 March 2017. The clip finds Shark channeling the disaffected and unmotivated workers of clerks, lazing about the supermarket aisles in a daze and generally just being a brat, joined by some equally-terrible co-workers.

== Track listing ==
1. "Weekends" - 3:10

== Charts ==
Chart (2017)	Peak position
Australia (ARIA)	59

== Certifications ==
Region	Certification	Certified units/sales
Australia (ARIA)	Platinum	70,000^{‡}
^{‡} Sales+streaming figures based on certification alone.

== Release history ==
Country	Date	Format	Version	Label
Australia	17 March 2017	Digital download	Original	Wonderlick /Sony Music Australia
