= Love Songs Ain't for Us =

Single by Amy Shark featuring Keith Urban

from the album Cry Forever
- Released: 19 February 2021
- Genre: Pop
- Length: 3:40
- Label: Wonderlick Entertainment; Sony Music Australia
- Songwriters: Amy Shark, Ed Sheeran

Amy Shark singles chronology
"All the Lies About Me" (2020)	"Love Songs Ain't for Us" (2021)	"Baby Steps" (2021)

Keith Urban singles chronology
"One Too Many" (2020)	"Love Songs Ain't for Us" (2021)	"Throw It Back" (2021)

"Love Songs Ain't for Us" is a song recorded by Australian singer-songwriter Amy Shark, featuring Keith Urban. The song was released on 19 February 2021 as the fourth single from Shark's second studio album, Cry Forever.

Shark recalls saying "Just before we started the writing session, Ed [Sheeran] asked me if I wrote songs about my man, I told him I do, but love songs aren't really for us. He then smiled and said 'ok that's what we'll do then'. I don't know why but I struggle to write straight forward love songs, the second they start sounding too lovey and gushy I tend to follow it up with a lyric that's semi sad or confronting. This song is as loved up as you'll get from me and I love it."

Speaking to Rolling Stone Australia, Shark explained that working with another artist is something which needs to feel "right" and "natural". Shark said "This particular song that he's on, it felt like it needed something, and when someone threw Keith Urban's name in, I was like, 'Oh my god, that's genius, and it's perfect!'... Once we sent it to him, he was just so stoked and more than happy to be involved, and just took the song to another level." "The song is so classy and timeless I needed to find a class act to join me. Keith is so professional and well respected around the world, so it was a no brainer".

At the 2021 ARIA Music Awards, the song was nominated for Song of the Year and the James Chappel directed video for Best Video.

At the APRA Music Awards of 2022, the song won Most Performed Country Work.

== Music video ==
The music video for "Love Songs Ain't for Us" was directed by James Chappel and produced by Yiani Andrikidis. It premiered on 19 February 2021.

== Reception ==
Women in Pop called the song "A gorgeous, tender ballad with country vibes... [which] showcases Shark's remarkable, emotive voice with little more than a gentle guitar and piano backing up her".

Tyler Jenke from Rolling Stone Australia described the song as "A smooth pop track which, while not full of the same outwardly anthemic qualities as previous tracks, revels in the quiet intensity, utilising the sort of country influences only someone like Keith Urban can add to the mix."

Laura English from Music Feeds said "The song is light on production and gentle with the instrumentals it introduces. It's carried by Shark and Urban's voices in a really lovely way."

== Charts ==
=== Weekly charts ===
Weekly chart performance for "Love Songs Ain't for Us"
Chart (2021)	Peak position
Australia (ARIA)	22
Australia Country Hot 50 (TMN)	1
New Zealand Hot Singles (RMNZ)	11

=== Year-end charts ===
Year-end chart performance for "Love Songs Ain't for Us"
Chart (2021)	Position
Australia (ARIA)	93

== Certification ==
Region	Certification	Certified units/sales
Australia (ARIA)	Platinum	70,000^{‡}
^{‡} Sales+streaming figures based on certification alone.
