= Unappropriate =

Studio album by Buddy Goode
- Released: August 17, 2012
- Length: 37:59
- Label: Goode Times Music, ABC Music

Buddy Goode chronology
The One and Only Buddy Goode (2011)	Unappropriate (2012)	It's a Buddy Goode Christmas (2013)

Unappropriate is the third studio album by Michael Carr's comedy character Buddy Goode. It was officially released both digitally and on CD in stores on 17 August 2012.

The album won an ARIA Award in the category of Best Comedy Release at the 2012 ceremony.

== Track listing ==
No.	Title	Length
1.	"Granny's Gettin' Some"	1:59
2.	"G String"	2:07
3.	"You Should Have Seen Her Box"	2:39
4.	"Like a Glove"	2:16
5.	"She Blows Upon Me Flute"	1:57
6.	"Desperate"	2:40
7.	"Play This Song on the Radio"	2:55
8.	"Too Soon"	3:20
9.	"Don't Go Swimmin'"	2:49
10.	"Back in the Bush"	1:55
11.	"I Love This Truckin'"	2:19
12.	"Number Two"	2:55
13.	"C'est La Vie"	2:47
14.	"She's a Man"	2:55
15.	"Happy Ending"	2:19
