= Psycho (Amy Shark song) =

Single by Amy Shark featuring Mark Hoppus

from the album Love Monster
- Released: 22 June 2018
- Genre: Alternative rock; indie pop
- Length: 3:26
- Label: Wonderlick Entertainment; Sony Music Australia
- Songwriters: Mark Hoppus; Amy Shark
- Producer: Mark Hoppus

Amy Shark singles chronology
"Don't Turn Around" (2018)	"Psycho" (2018)	"All Loved Up" (2018)

"Psycho" is a song recorded by Australian singer-songwriter Amy Shark featuring Mark Hoppus of Blink-182. The song was released on 22 June 2018, as an album pre-order track, and as the third single from Shark's debut studio album Love Monster.

Speaking to Beats 1's Zane, Lowe Hoppus said he met Shark in Los Angeles and she asked him to work on something together, to which he agreed. Hoppus said “Amy had this great idea for a song and for me it was a lot easier than working with a lot of other artist because her music is so sparse. A lot of times it's just her and a guitar, so even just her an acoustic guitar and maybe a beat behind it. My job was really easy, I just had to not over add stuff to kill the idea that she already had.”

== Reception ==
Madelyn Tait from The Music Au, in an album review, called the song the album highlight, saying "The stripped-back, mostly acoustic duet is sweet and has a slight pop-punk feel, and their voices nicely complement each other as they sing about love over fingerpicked, intertwining guitars and crashing drums."

Cameron Adams from Herald Sun, in an album review, said the song "builds to a classy crescendo."

== Track listing ==
1. "Psycho" - 3:26

== Charts ==
Chart (2018)	Peak position
Australia (ARIA)	130
Australian Artist (ARIA)	14

== Certifications ==
Region	Certification	Certified units/sales
Australia (ARIA)	Gold	35,000^{‡}
^{‡} Sales+streaming figures based on certification alone.

== Release history ==
Country	Date	Format	Version	Label	Catalogue
Australia	22 June 2018	Digital download	Original	Wonderlick/Sony Music Australia	
