= I Said Hi =

Single by Amy Shark

from the album Love Monster
- Released: 13 April 2018
- Length: 2:48
- Label: Wonderlick Entertainment/Sony Music Australia
- Songwriter: Amy Shark
- Producers: Dann Hume, M-Phazes

Amy Shark singles chronology
"Drive You Mad" (2017)	"I Said Hi" (2018)	"Don't Turn Around" (2018)

"I Said Hi" is a song recorded by Australian singer-songwriter Amy Shark. It was released on 13 April 2018 as the lead single from her studio album Love Monster (July 2018). At the ARIA Music Awards of 2018, Dann Hume and M-Phazes won Producer of the Year for their work on "I Said Hi". At the APRA Music Awards of 2019, it won Pop Work of the Year and Song of the Year. For the ceremony, Electric Fields performed their cover version of "I Said Hi". On the ARIA Singles Chart, it peaked at No. 6. By the end of 2020 it was certified 5× platinum for shipment of over 350000 copies.

== Background ==
Amy Shark says "I Said Hi" was inspired by her retort to managers when they told her whom she was meeting to discuss her future: the same people who had knocked back her emails and calls. Shark told MusicFeeds: "It's an anthem for anyone who is waking up everyday fighting for what they believe in and challenging the universe!"

At the ARIA Music Awards of 2018, "I Said Hi" was nominated for four awards; with Dann Hume and M-Phazes winning the Producer of the Year for "I Said Hi". At the APRA Music Awards of 2019, the song won Pop Work of the Year and Song of the Year. At the event, Electric Fields performed the song. At the Queensland Music Awards 2019 "I Said Hi" won Highest Selling Single.

== Music video ==
The music video, filmed in Melbourne, was directed by Nick Waterman and co-directed by Amy Shark and released on 8 May 2018.

== Charts ==
=== Weekly charts ===
Chart (2018)	Peak position
Australia (ARIA)	6
US Adult Pop Airplay (Billboard)	34
US Adult Alternative Airplay (Billboard)	38

=== Year-end charts ===
Chart (2018)	Position
Australia (ARIA)	31

== Certifications ==
Region	Certification	Certified units/sales
Australia (ARIA)	5× Platinum	350,000^{‡}
New Zealand (RMNZ)	Platinum	30,000^{‡}
^{‡} Sales+streaming figures based on certification alone.

== Release history ==
Country	Date	Format	Label	Catalogue
Australia	13 April 2018	Digital download, streaming	Wonderlick, Sony Music Australia	886447028506
United Kingdom	28 December 2018	TV and Radio Airplay, Digital Download	Columbia	
