= It's All Goode =

Studio album by Buddy Goode
- Released: November 7, 2008
- Length: 46:05
- Label: Goode Times Music, ABC Music

Buddy Goode chronology
It's All Goode (2008)	The One and Only Buddy Goode (2011)

It's All Goode is the first studio album by Michael Carr's comedy character Buddy Goode. It was officially released both digitally and on CD in stores on 7 November 2008. The album is the first appearance by Carr's comedy character, and features the single that launched his career in 2007, "Dutchy in the Morning".

On 18 January 2013, the album was re-released into select stores as a double pack with Goode's second album, The One and Only Buddy Goode.

== Track listing ==
No.	Title	Length
1.	"Buddy Goode Time"	3:19
2.	"Intro (I.)"	0.32
3.	"One Night in a Bangkok Bar"	3:48
4.	"Intro (II.)"	0.34
5.	"Summer Sun"	3:21
6.	"Intro (III.)"	0:38
7.	"Having My Baby"	2:48
8.	"Intro (IV.)"	0:55
9.	"She Gave Me Everything"	3:59
10.	"Intro (V.)"	0:43
11.	"You Ain't Mine"	3:47
12.	"Intro (VI)"	0:56
13.	"I Swing Both Ways"	3:12
14.	"Intro (VII)"	0:50
15.	"A Friend in Jesus"	3:21
16.	"Intro (VIII)"	0:44
17.	"Afternoon Delight"	2:59
18.	"Intro (IX)"	0:18
19.	"Dutchy in the Morning"	4:06
20.	"Intro (X)"	1:10
21.	"Ossie Medley"	4:04
