= Love Monster (album) =

Studio album by Amy Shark
- Released: 13 July 2018
- Genre: Pop
- Length: 47:11
- Label: Wonderlick; Sony
- Producer: Dann Hume; M-Phazes; Jack Antonoff; CamBluff; Joel Little; Edwin White; Mark Hoppus

Amy Shark chronology
Night Thinker (2017)	Love Monster (2018)	Cry Forever (2021)

Singles from Love Monster
- 1. "I Said Hi" Released: 13 April 2018; 2. "Don't Turn Around" Released: 8 June 2018; 3. "Psycho" Released: 22 June 2018; 4. "All Loved Up" Released: 3 August 2018; 5. "Mess Her Up" Released: 1 March 2019

Love Monster is the debut studio album by Australian alternative pop singer-songwriter Amy Shark, released on 13 July 2018 by Wonderlick Entertainment and Sony Music Australia.

Shark said "I think I want to start explaining it like the first two seasons of a great series you've just found. It's full of so much drama. There's first loves, there's rejection and lies and beautiful moments and nasty moments and there's a death. It's a great series."

The album was supported by an Australian national tour throughout August and September 2018.

At the ARIA Music Awards of 2018, Love Monster won Album of the Year, Best Female Artist and Best Pop Release.

At the J Awards of 2018, the album was nominated for Australian Album of the Year.

== Singles ==
"I Said Hi" was the album's lead single, released on 13 April 2018. It reached the top 10 and peaked at #6 in Australia. The song is about overcoming adversity and a nod to perseverance. Shark explains: "It's about the struggle of the ups and downs of the industry. It hasn't been a complete Cinderella story for me from day one. It's taken a while."

"Don't Turn Around" was originally released on 8 June 2018 as an album pre-order track, and was later confirmed as the album's second single. In a statement, Shark said: "It's a song that talks about the desire to run into someone you have feelings for, a history with who knows you too well."

"Psycho" was released on 22 June 2018 as an album pre-order track and the album's third single. The song tells the emotional, relatable saga of vulnerability and the complications that often come with falling in love. The track features vocals from Blink-182 frontman and bassist, Mark Hoppus.

"All Loved Up" was released to radio on 3 August 2018 as the album's fourth single. The following week, it was the most added song on radio.

A single edit of "Mess Her Up" was released digitally on 1 March 2019 as the album's fifth single. The digital single included an acoustic version of the track.

The album includes the single "Adore" from Shark's 2017 Night Thinker EP.

== Critical reception ==
Professional ratings
Review scores
Source	Rating
The Music	4/5 stars
Herald Sun	4/5 stars
auspOp	4/5 stars

Madelyn Tait from The Music ranked the album 4 out of 5 saying: "With Shark seemingly unafraid of being vulnerable and exposing it all in her lyrics, Love Monster is full of super-specific storytelling that still seems universally relatable", adding that the album is "full of memorable melodies, lyrical poetry and pop sensibility." Tait added "In terms of composition and production, Love Monster draws influences from several genres and styles, resulting in an interesting final product, bound together by Shark's distinct vocals."

Cameron Adams from Herald Sun gave the album 4 out of 5 saying "Shark's power is intimate lyrics, littered with visual references that manage to be both personal and communal."

David from auspOp gave the album 4 out of 5 saying Shark has "created a strong debut album" adding it "tackles all the experiences we have in life; love, loss, anger – it's all there." He concluded saying "It's really hard to get a debut album right, but Shark has done a great job in creating a diverse, yet cohesive set."

== Track listing ==
Love Monster track listing
No.	Title	Writer(s)	Producer(s)	Length
1.	"I Got You"	Amy Billings; Daniel Benjamin Cobbe	Dann Hume	2:58
2.	"Adore"	Billings; Mark Landon	M-Phazes; CamBluff	3:05
3.	"All Loved Up"	Billings; Jack Antonoff	Antonoff	3:30
4.	"I Said Hi"	Billings	Hume; M-Phazes	2:48
5.	"The Idiot"	Billings	Hume	3:17
6.	"Never Coming Back"	Billings; Joel Little	Little	3:13
7.	"Leave Us Alone"	Billings	Edwin White	3:31
8.	"Psycho" (featuring Mark Hoppus)	Billings; Mark Hoppus	Hoppus	3:26
9.	"Don't Turn Around"	Billings	Hume	3:05
10.	"Middle of the Night"	Billings	Hume	3:38
11.	"Mess Her Up"	Billings	Hume	3:28
12.	"The Slow Song"	Billings	Hume	2:52
13.	"I'm a Liar"	Billings	Hume	3:24
14.	"You Think I Think I Sound Like God"	Billings	Hume	4:55
Total length:				47:11

== Charts ==
=== Weekly charts ===
Chart (2018)	Peak position
Australian Albums (ARIA)	1
New Zealand Albums (RMNZ)	7
Swiss Albums (Schweizer Hitparade)	34
US Heatseekers Albums (Billboard)	2

=== Year-end charts ===
Chart (2018)	Position
Australian Albums (ARIA)	14

Chart (2019)	Position
Australian Albums (ARIA)	31

== Certifications ==
Region	Certification	Certified units/sales
Australia (ARIA)	Platinum	70,000^{‡}
New Zealand (RMNZ)	Gold	7,500^{‡}
^{‡} Sales+streaming figures based on certification alone.

== Release history ==
Country	Date	Format	Label	Catalogue
Australia	13 July 2018	Digital download, CD, vinyl	Wonderlick Entertainment, Sony Music Australia	LICK021 /LICK025

== See also ==
- List of number-one albums of 2018 (Australia)
