= Everybody Rise =

Single by Amy Shark

from the album Cry Forever
- Released: 18 June 2020
- Length: 3:10
- Label: Wonderlick Entertainment; Sony Music Australia
- Songwriter(s): Amy Shark, Joel Little
- Producer(s): Joel Little

Amy Shark singles chronology
"The Reaper" (2019)	"Everybody Rise" (2020)	"C'mon" (2020)

"Everybody Rise" is a song by Australian singer-songwriter Amy Shark. The song was released digitally on 18 June 2020 as the lead single from Shark's forthcoming second studio album, Cry Forever. An acoustic version was released on 7 August 2020.

At the ARIA Music Awards of 2020, the song garnered Shark nominations for Best Female Artist and Best Pop Release, winning the latter.

The song was nominated for Song of the Year and Most Performed Pop Work at the APRA Music Awards of 2021

The song won the Highest Selling Single at the 2021 Queensland Music Awards.

== Music video ==
The music video for "Everybody Rise" was directed and produced by Patrick Tohill and premiered on 18 June 2020.

== Track listing ==
1. "Everybody Rise" – 3:10
1. "Everybody Rise" (acoustic) – 3:46

== Charts ==
=== Weekly charts ===
Chart (2020)	Peak position
Australia (ARIA)	31

=== Year-end charts ===
Chart (2020)	Position
Australian Artist (ARIA)	13
Chart (2021)	Position
Australian Artist (ARIA)	40

== Certifications ==
Region	Certification	Certified units/sales
Australia (ARIA)	Platinum	70,000^{‡}
^{‡} Sales+streaming figures based on certification alone.
