= Sunday Sadness =

Studio album by Amy Shark
- Released: 9 August 2024
- Length: 30:15
- Labels: Amy Shark; Sony Australia
- Producers: Matt Corby; Sam de Jong; Dann Hume; Jon Hume; Kid Harpoon; Joel Little; Aaron Rubin

Amy Shark chronology
Cry Forever (2021)	Sunday Sadness (2024)	Soft Pop (2026)

Singles from Sunday Sadness
- 1. "Can I Shower at Yours" Released: 22 June 2023; 2. "Beautiful Eyes" Released: 19 January 2024; 3. "Loving Me Lover" Released: 26 April 2024; 4. "Two Friends" Released: 28 June 2024; 5. "My Only Friend" Released: 26 July 2024

Sunday Sadness is the third studio album by Australian alternative pop singer-songwriter Amy Shark. It was released on 9 August 2024 through Sony Music Australia. The album was announced on 26 April 2024, alongside the release of the third single "Loving Me Lover".

The album was supported with the Sadness Tour across Australia and New Zealand in October and November 2024.

At the 2024 ARIA Music Awards, the album was nominated for Album of the Year, Best Pop Release and for Shark, Best Solo Artist. The album was also shortlisted for Best LP/EP at the 2025 Rolling Stone Australia Awards.

== Critical reception ==
Professional ratings
Review scores
Source	Rating
The Courier-Mail	3/5 stars
Rolling Stone Australia	5/5 stars

Poppy Reid from Rolling Stone Australia gave the album a perfect score, saying, "Amy Shark has always been led by vulnerability, but what places Sunday Sadness in the lead of her long-player canon is that it feels more seductive than its predecessors. From glorious guitar lines to brain-tickling production elements, to her most quotable lyrics yet, Amy sounds more aware than ever of the chokehold she has over pop."

John O'Brien from The Courier-Mail described the album as "i.a grab-bag of musical styles, from the retro electro-rock of 'Can I Shower at Yours' to the breezy guitars of 'Loving Me Lover' and the Lisa Loeb vibe of autobiographical 'I'm Sorry'."

Zoë Radas from Stack Magazine described the album as "a collection of gems that are as easy to binge as a pack of peanut M&Ms" and closes the review saying "Sunday Sadness thumps all the bells it sets up."

Broken8Records said: "Sunday Sadness stands out in Shark's discography due to its seductive allure. The combination of brilliant guitar riffs, innovative production, and unforgettable lyrics showcases Shark's confidence and mastery of pop music."

Mike DeWald from Riff Magazine wrote: "As a complete work, Sunday Sadness may be Shark's most cohesive record from front to back, with a balanced mix of the familiar and unfamiliar all fitting under the same umbrella."

== Track listing ==
Sunday Sadness track listing
No.	Title	Writer(s)	Producer(s)	Length
1.	"Slide Down the Wall"	Billings	Matt Corby; Dann Hume^{[a]}	2:23
2.	"It's Nice to Feel This Way Again"	Billings; Joel Little	Little	2:25
3.	"Beautiful Eyes"	Billings	Jon Hume	2:49
4.	"Gone"	Billings	Hume	2:17
5.	"Can I Shower at Yours"	Billings	D. Hume	1:56
6.	"Loving Me Lover"	Billings; Thomas Hull	Kid Harpoon	3:24
7.	"Two Friends"	Billings; Sam de Jong	de Jong	3:06
8.	"Babe"	Billings; J. Hume	J. Hume	3:05
9.	"I'm Sorry"	Billings	D. Hume	2:58
10.	"My Only Friend" (with Tom DeLonge)	Billings	D. Hume; Aaron Rubin	3:03
11.	"Our Time Together"	Billings	D. Hume	2:43
Total length:				30:15

Note

- ^{^[a]} signifies an additional producer

== Personnel ==
- Amy Shark – vocals (all tracks), guitar (tracks 2–11)
- Leon Zervos – mastering
- Dann Hume – mixing (all tracks), programming (tracks 1, 4, 5, 9–11)
- Matt Corby – guitar (track 1)
- Joel Little – programming (track 2)
- Jon Hume – programming (tracks 3, 8)
- Kid Harpoon – programming (track 6)
- Sam de Jong – programming (track 7)
- Aaron Rubin – programming (track 10)
- Tom DeLonge – vocals (track 10)
- Jess Gleeson – photography
- Connor Dewhurst – design, layout

== Charts ==
=== Weekly charts ===
Weekly chart performance for Sunday Sadness
Chart (2024)	Peak position
Australian Albums (ARIA)	1
New Zealand Albums (RMNZ)	28

=== Year-end charts ===
2024 year-end chart performance for Sunday Sadness
Chart (2024)	Position
Australian Artist Albums (ARIA)	17

== Release history ==
Release history and details for Sunday Sadness
Region	Date	Format	Label	Catalogue	Ref.
Various	9 August 2024	Digital download; streaming	Sony Music Australia	Not applicable	
Australia	9 August 2024	CD; LP	Sony Music Australia	19802810432, 19802810481	
