= Amy Shark =

Australian indie pop musician (born 1986)

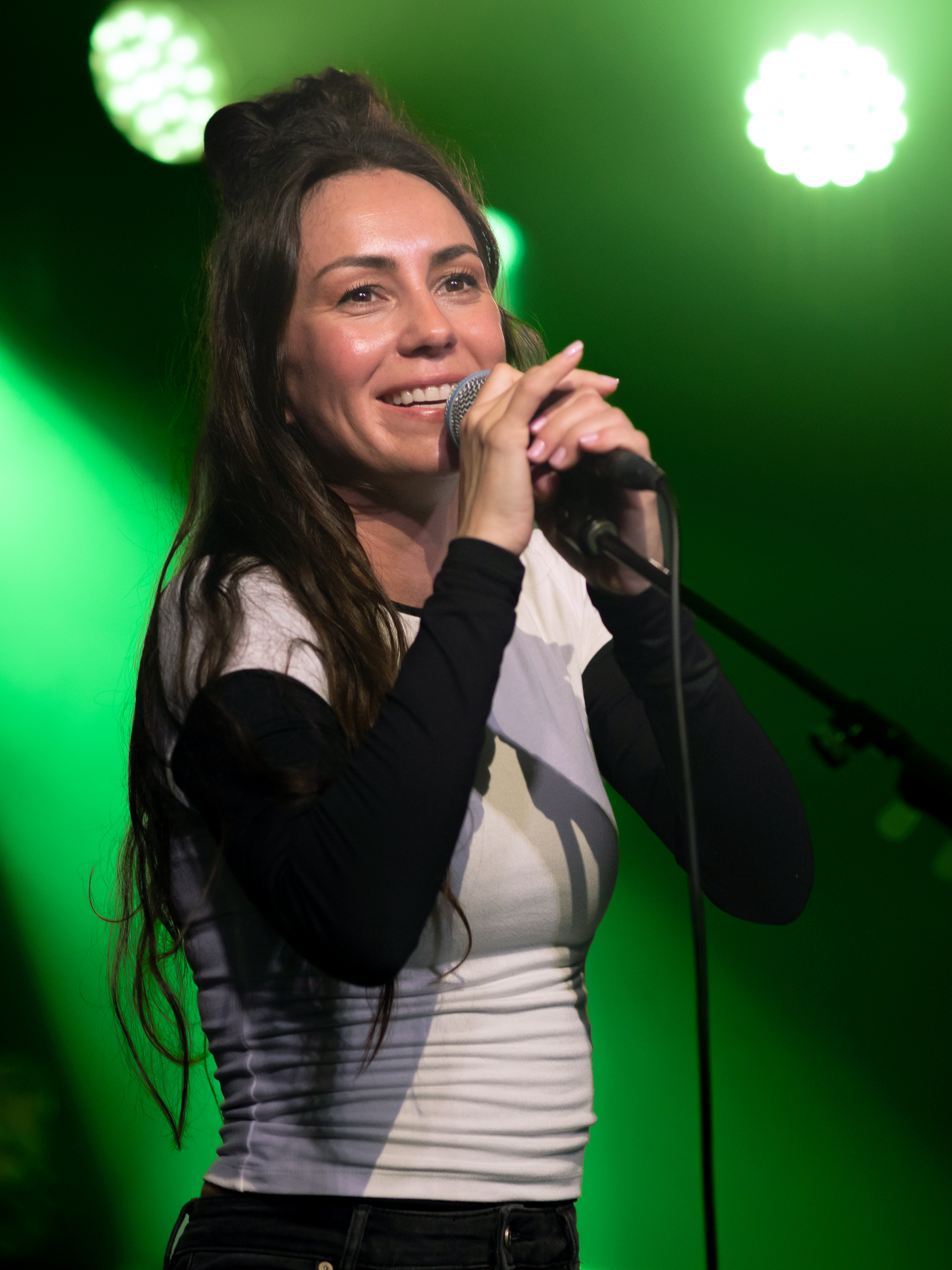
- Shark performing in 2023

Background information
- Also known as: Amy Cushway; Little Sleeper
- Born: 14 May 1986 (age 40); Gold Coast, Queensland, Australia
- Genre: Indie pop
- Occupations: Singer; musician; songwriter
- Instruments: Vocals; guitar
- Years active: 2006–present
- Labels: Amy Shark (independent); Wonderlick; Sony; RCA
- Spouse: Shane Billings (m. 2013)
- Website: amyshark.com

Amy Louise Billings (born 14 May 1986), known professionally as Amy Shark, is an Australian indie pop singer-songwriter, and television personality from the Gold Coast, Queensland. From 2008 to 2012, her early solo material was released and performed under the name Amy Cushway. Her 2016 single "Adore" peaked at number 3 on the ARIA Singles Chart and was also listed at number 2 on the Triple J Hottest 100, 2016. Her album Love Monster (July 2018) debuted at number 1 on the ARIA Albums Chart. Shark has won 8 ARIA Music Awards from 29 nominations, including winning Best Pop Release three times: in 2017 for her extended play, Night Thinker, 2018 for Love Monster and 2020 for "Everybody Rise". In addition to her musical career, Shark has served as a judge on Australian Idol since 2023.

== Early life ==
Amy Shark was born on the Gold Coast, Queensland in Australia on 14 May 1986. Her mother, Robyn, remarried and raised Shark on the Gold Coast with her stepfather David Cushway and a younger half-sibling. She is of Hungarian and English descent. She attended Southport State High School, where she performed in theatre, studied film, and played guitar in an all-female punk-band. Also attending that school was singer-songwriter Ricki-Lee Coulter. Cushway described her first group, Dorothy's Rainbow and Hansel Kissed Gretel, as "'quite thrashy', though it fell apart when its members splintered. 'I kept going, kept writing songs on my acoustic guitar'." Her first job was selling T-shirts at a souvenir shop, Gone Troppo. She subsequently performed under various names, including Amy Cushway, Amy Billings, and as Little Sleeper.

== Career ==
=== 2008–2013: Amy Cushway ===
Amy Shark recorded and performed as Amy Cushway from 2008 to 2012. Her first solo gig was at Burleigh Bears Rugby League Club, where she performed cover versions. Initial solo performances had her singing to an acoustic guitar. In June 2008 Cushway supported gigs by Brianna Carpenter at The Globe and at The Red Brick Hotel, Brisbane. She released her debut extended play, I Thought of You Out Loud, which included the track, "Take Time Take Me", in mid-2008 and performed the EP at solo gigs from July. She later described this EP, "[it] was me not knowing any chords but so emotionally drained that I needed something to lift me up and get my blood flowing again." The singer-songwriter made the finals for the 2008 Q Songs Awards in August with "Take Time Take Me" for the alternative category. She reflected on her writing style, "It's so much easier and more enjoyable to start from scratch with a song and write it exactly how you want. It sounds selfish, but it's just reality [...] I definitely write songs that the typical ear hasn't heard before, the lyrics are honest and relate to all ages. I'm not trying to write songs solely for radio … I want hard hitting pop rock songs that can be played on radio, whilst having the potential to be blasted through stadiums." She derived inspiration from Tegan and Sara, "they find different ways to deliver the meaning of a song with lyrics that don’t necessarily spell it out." In November the artist backed Rhiannon Hart at Island Vibe Festival, South Brisbane.

Cushway's second EP, Love's Not Anorexic, appeared in mid-2009, supported by a national tour from July. The title attracted criticism from community groups, she explained, "it was not a personal attack on people suffering from anorexia but a good catchy title." Another EP track, "Cool Kids Die", relates to recent acquaintances of her age group who had died, "It's not fair that they were all decent, polite and cool kids. Life isn't fair sometimes." Christie Eliezer of In Music & Media described the EP, "Her new tracks see her move from delicate acoustic ballads to thunderous beats, as 'Little Overweight for TV' and 'Breathing on Aeroplanes' streaming on [her website] show. Labels are sniffing..." Whereas the artist felt, "[it's] a slightly grown up version of the one before with a splash of garage electric guitar." She made the finals of the 2009 Q Songs with, "Stupid not To", vying for the Q Music Encouragement Award. In November of that year the artist described her early material, "As much as I enjoy writing intricate acoustic ballads, there's nothing better than adding thunderous beats and raw energy to your set." She was living in Varsity Lakes in April 2010 and explained how, "[record companies] did not ask for demos now, but just asked what her MySpace page was." In late 2010 she formed the band, Fly Boy Fly, with collaborator and bassist, Ryan Nash, and drummer, Tom Moore. "A few people put it into my head, if I ever thought of fronting a band." The band's name "was kind of a mixture of things. I'm a little bit obsessed with Peter Pan and The Lost Boys, and my partner Shane is very much into war movies... one night we got out Flyboys... [and] threw around some [band] names and that was one of them."

Cushway described her third EP, Broadway Gossip (October 2010), "this was me returning home to Australia from the United States and thinking I need to experiment with beats." Cushway's first album, It's a Happy City appeared in March 2012. "It's extremely fun and I recommend it to you, your parents, grandparents or anyone with a pulse" she explained. In early 2012 Billings was her talent manager with Rooftop Artist Management. By December 2016, Shark was no longer using the name Cushway, and material under that name had been deleted from her accounts.

=== 2013–2017: New name and Night Thinker ===
During 2013, the artist started using the stage name, Amy Shark, because Jaws was her favourite film.. In February 2014 she independently released a five-track extended play, Nelson. One of its tracks, "Weight of the World", was a finalist at the 2013 Queensland Music Awards in the regional category. She activated a new YouTube account, as Amy Shark Music, in 2014 and issued a single, "Spits on Girls", in July.

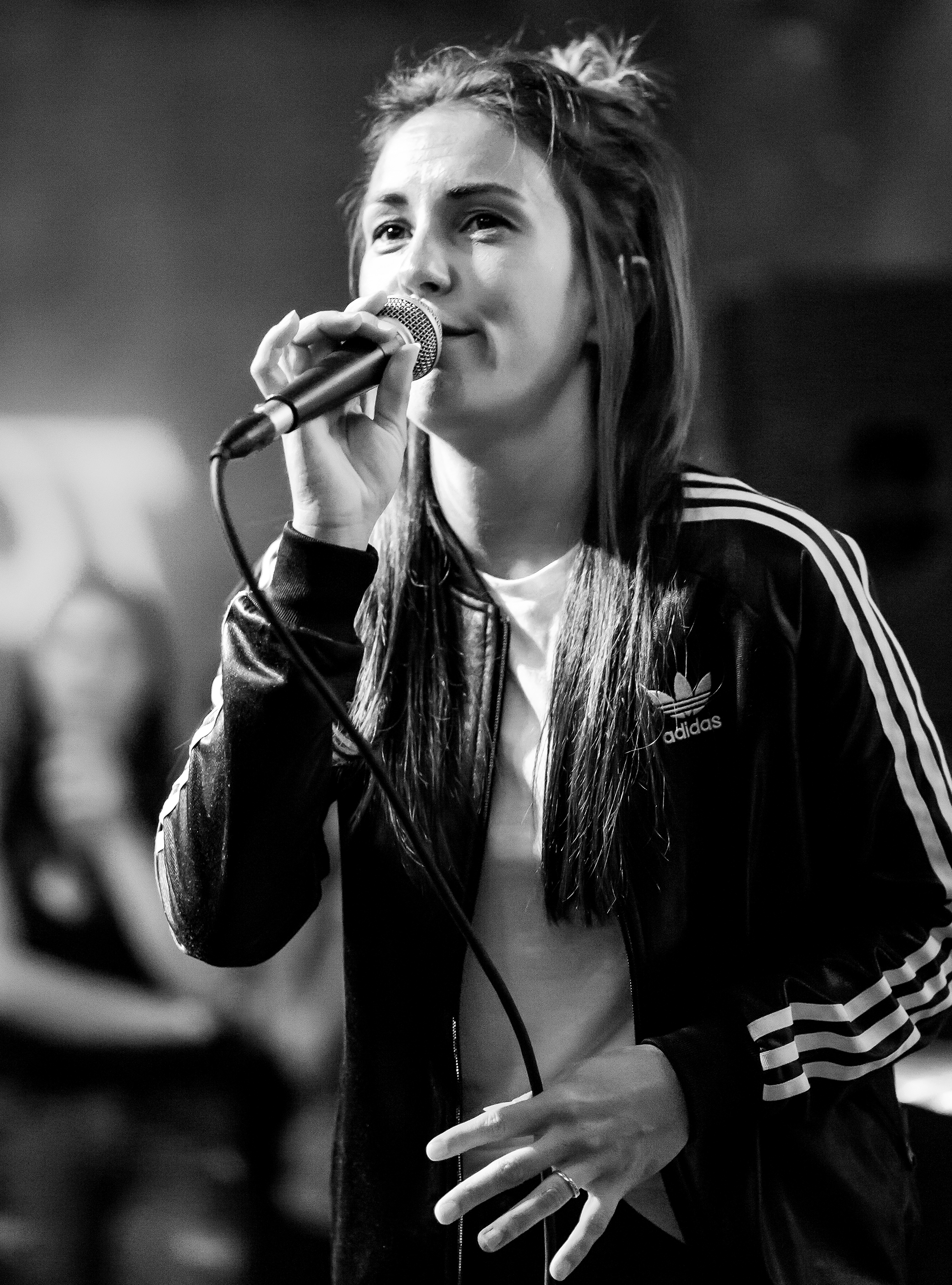
Shark performing in Los Angeles in June 2017

Shark released her next self-produced single, "Golden Fleece", in October 2015, originally under the name, Little Sleeper. The singer later explained why she dropped the Little Sleeper name, "I've been in talks with these music supervisors in America ... And they said we'd prefer it if I was playing under the name Amy Shark again." Chris Singh of The AU Review observed, "The song, powerful and penetrating in itself, is given visuals both understated and intense as Little Sleeper stands in darkness with her guitar and is progressively drenched in multi-coloured paint." It won Pop Song of the Year at the Queensland Music Awards in 2016, and Shark embarked on a nationwide tour supporting Sydney band, Tigertown in December. She received a grant from the City of Gold Coast council, which allowed her to work with more popular producers. She later recalled how music industry personnel had told her to quit, "Please stop sending unsolicited material to me, your music is no good and it's not something we would be interested in anyway."

In July 2016, she released her next single, "Adore", with co-production by Shark, M-Phazes and Cam Bluff, in addition to a cover version of Silverchair's "Miss You Love" for Triple J's show Like a Version. "Adore" received significant airplay on Triple J, leading to a bidding war between major labels, which was won by Sony Music Australia. Shark signed with Wonderlick/Sony in November 2016. Two of her earlier singles, "Spits on Girls" and "Golden Fleece", were re-released by Wonderlick/Sony in 2016. "Adore" was listed at number 2 on the Triple J Hottest 100, 2016, behind Flume's "Never Be like You".

In March 2017, Shark released "Weekends" followed by another EP, Night Thinker (April), which peaked at number 2 on the ARIA Singles Chart. In April she won Artist of the Year and Song of the Year at the Gold Coast Music Awards. In November she was named Apple Music's UpNext artist. At the ARIA Music Awards of 2017 Shark was nominated for 6 awards and won both Best Pop Release and Breakthrough Artist for Night Thinker. She performed "Adore" at the ceremony. On 15 November 2017, she appeared on The Late Late Show with James Corden singing "Adore", and performed it again on 13 March 2018 on The Tonight Show Starring Jimmy Fallon.

=== 2018–2019: Love Monster ===
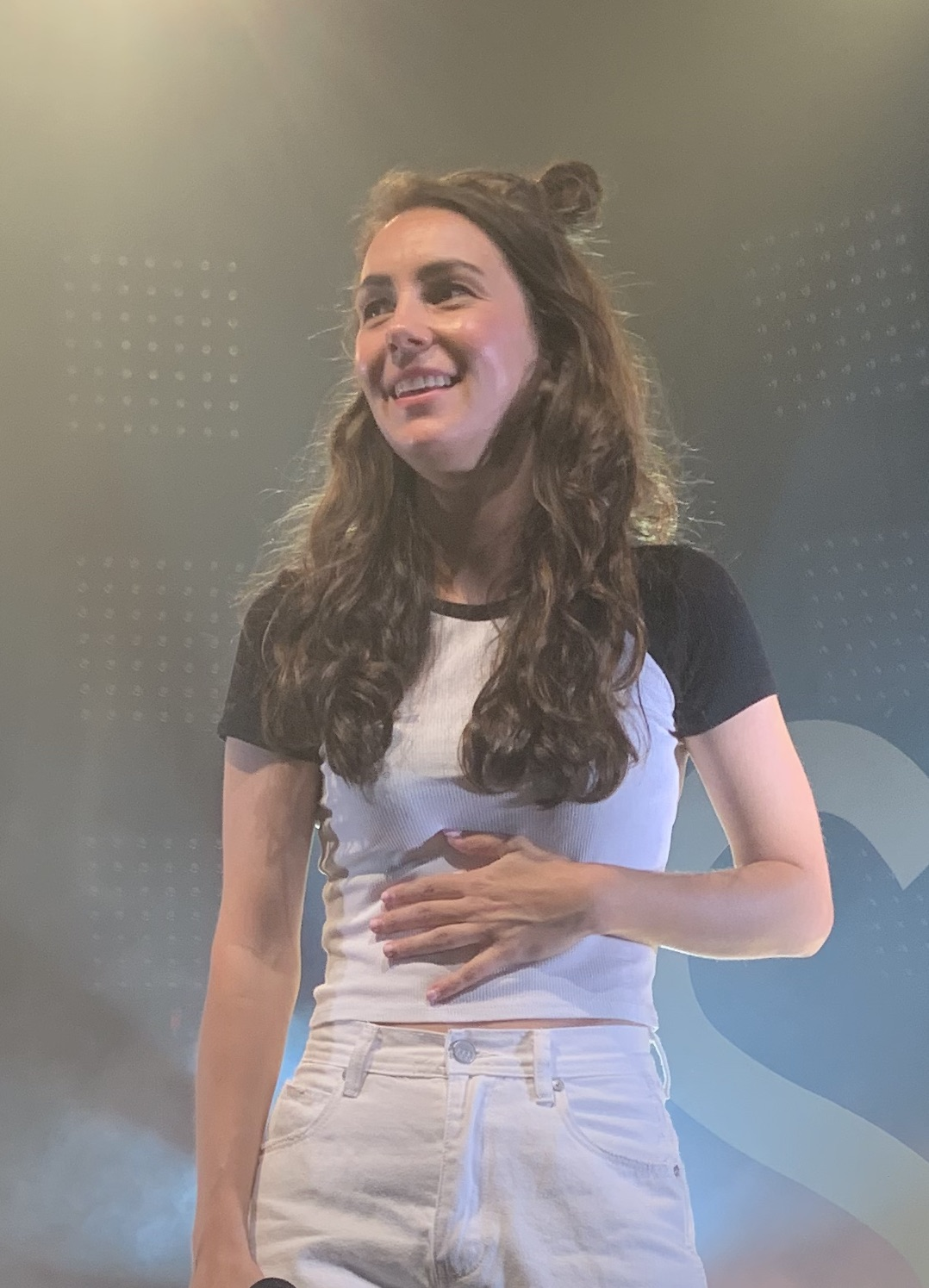
Shark performing in Wodonga in 2019

In March 2018, Shark provided, "Sink In", for the film soundtrack of Love, Simon. The related album, by various artists, debuted at No. 37 on the Billboard 200. The following month, she performed at the Commonwealth Games closing ceremony on the Gold Coast, in a duet with Archie Roach and an Indigenous youth choir for a rendition of Roach's "Let Love Rule".

On 11 April 2018, Shark premiered a single, "I Said Hi", on Triple J before releasing it the following day. It received unpaid promotion by comedians, and digital radio show hosts, Luke and Lewis using posters, megaphone and a large home-made sign hung up next to the Fox FM Melbourne station logo. That promotion captured the attention of the singer-songwriter who displayed it on her own Instagram account. "I Said Hi" peaked at number 6 on the ARIA charts.

Shark's album, Love Monster, was released on 13 July 2018 and it debuted at number 1 on the ARIA Charts. The album provided four additional singles, including "Mess Her Up" (March 2019). At the ARIA Music Awards of 2018, the artist won four ARIA Music Awards, with Album of the Year, Best Pop Release and Best Female Artist for Love Monster, and Producer of the Year for Dann Hume and M-Phazes work on "I Said Hi". She was the most nominated artist and equal highest winner in that year.

At the ARIA ceremony, Shark's acceptance speech for Album of the Year included her thanks to "the people who helped make her album. Her producers, her management and the fans." Also attending was her label boss, Denis Handlin, however, "she didn’t thank Handlin, or the Sony label." She had acknowledged them in earlier speeches. According to The Sydney Morning Herald's Nathanael Cooper, "[Handlin] was furious she hadn’t thanked him or Sony in her speech for the major award." Furthermore, Shark was "required to be in the office early the next morning to publicly apologise for failing to thank" him and the label.

Shark promoted Love Monster during 2019 on her Regional Australia Tour. In December 2019, the Chainsmokers' single, "The Reaper", featured Shark on vocals. At the ARIA Music Awards of 2019, she received four more nominations.

=== 2020–2025: Cry Forever and Sunday Sadness ===
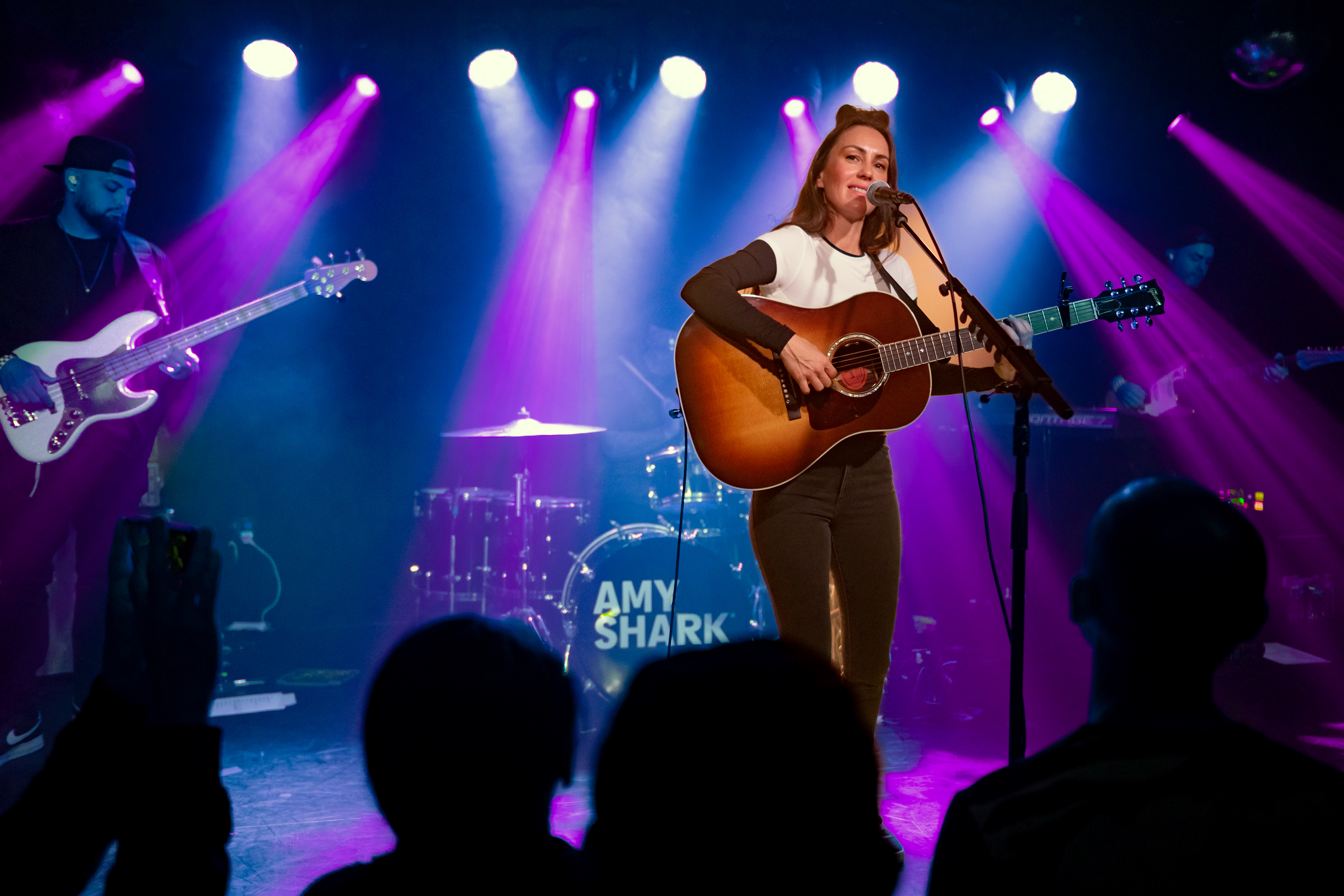
Shark with her backing band at Moroccan Lounge, Los Angeles, June 2023

For her latest album, Amy Shark worked with Ed Sheeran, Diplo, Billy Corgan of Smashing Pumpkins, and the Chainsmokers. On 16 February 2020, Shark performed at the Fire Fight Australia fund-raising relief concert in Sydney for the effects of the 2019–20 Australian bushfire season. Her live performance of "I Said Hi" appeared on the related album by various artists, Artists Unite for Fire Fight: Concert for National Bushfire Relief (12 March 2020). Thomas Bleach observed that she was, "euphorically telling the world that Australia says hi and thank you for all the support that has been given."

On 6 March 2020, Shark announced a management deal with Redlight's Will Botwin for international markets while husband, Shane Billings continued to manage her for the local market. On 23 October 2020, Shark released a single "C'mon" featuring blink-182 drummer Travis Barker. Alexander Pan of Tone Deaf observed, "[it's] a thumping power-pop ballad that's got a considerable amount of weight behind it." Two days later she performed at the 2020 NRL Grand Final at Stadium Australia, Sydney. At the 2020 ARIA Music Awards, she won Best Pop Release for her single, "Everybody Rise" (June 2020)—marking the third time she'd received the award. Shark performed the track live at the ceremony. She also performed as part of an all-female ensemble, singing "I Am Woman", in honour of Helen Reddy (1941–2020). At the ceremony, she also won the public-voted category, Best Australian Live Act for her Regional Tour during 2019.

On 4 December 2020, Shark announced her second studio album for Sony, Cry Forever, which was released on 30 April 2021. Shark released the single "All the Lies About Me", alongside the album's announcement and additionally announced a national headline tour for mid-2021. Shark revealed the album's track listing in an interview with Rolling Stone Australia' Tyler Jenke on the same day.

"Love Songs Ain't for Us", featuring Australian country musician Keith Urban, was released on 19 February 2021 as the album's fourth single. The song was co-written with English singer Ed Sheeran. At the APRA Music Awards of 2022 it won Most Performed Country Work. On 19 March 2021, Shark appeared on Triple J's Like a Version segment, performing a cover of Fall Out Boy's "Sugar, We're Going Down" alongside a performance of her original track "Baby Steps" (marking her debut live performance of the song).

Shark appeared as a contestant on the sixth season of The Celebrity Apprentice Australia from May to June 2022, she finished in the top 4. The singer released "Sway My Way", a cover version of Bic Runga's "Sway", with R3HAB in July 2022. She released her solo single, "Only Wanna Be with You", in October 2022. Shark was a judge for the 2023 reboot of Australian Idol on the Seven Network, and the 2024 season. She supported Coldplay's gigs in Perth, Australia in mid-November 2023.

Shark's third studio album Sunday Sadness was released on 9 August 2024.

=== 2026: Soft Pop ===
In March 2026, Shark announced her fourth studio album Soft Pop would be released on 24 July 2026.

== Personal life ==
Amy Shark's birth father separated from her mother, Robyn, when Shark was "just a baby, one or two". Upon the success of "Adore", Shark replied to her birth father's attempt to re-establish contact, "Haven't heard from my father in 15 years until now. It must suck knowing ur daughter got all this way on her very own! Now beat it! I'm busy." Of her stepfather, David Cushway, she recalled "I used to call him Dave and I remember the day I said to Mum, 'Do you think I could call Dave "Dad"?' She cried. She said, 'Why don't you go and ask him?' So I went and asked him, and he cried. I was only young but I remember it really well." Early recordings were credited to Amy Cushway (2008–2012).

In 2007 Shark met Shane Billings (born 1983 or 1984), a New Zealand-born Gold Coast financial manager; they married on 11 May 2013. Her written material is credited to Amy Louise Billings. The couple worked with the local National Rugby League football club, Gold Coast Titans: Shark as a video editor and Shane managing finances. She left that job in November 2016. Shane was also Shark's talent manager until she signed with Jaddan Comerford of UNIFIED Music Group, and continued as her manager for the local market. The couple were residents of Broadbeach Waters. They relocated to Sydney by 2021.

In September 2021 Shane founded Rage More Records as a talent management company and recording label. The label's first release is a single "I'm not Giving Up" (September 2021) by IndyAnna Baby, which is co-written by Shark with that artist. Shark cancelled a proposed American tour set for September 2023 due to hospitalisation for an unspecified illness in early August. The artist described having felt discomfort before seeking medical assistance and was due to undergo surgery with a month for recovery. By late September the singer performed at El Rey Theatre, Los Angeles.

== Discography ==
Studio albums

- It's a Happy City (2012, as Amy Cushway)
- Love Monster (2018)
- Cry Forever (2021)
- Sunday Sadness (2024)
- Soft Pop (2026)

== Concert tours ==
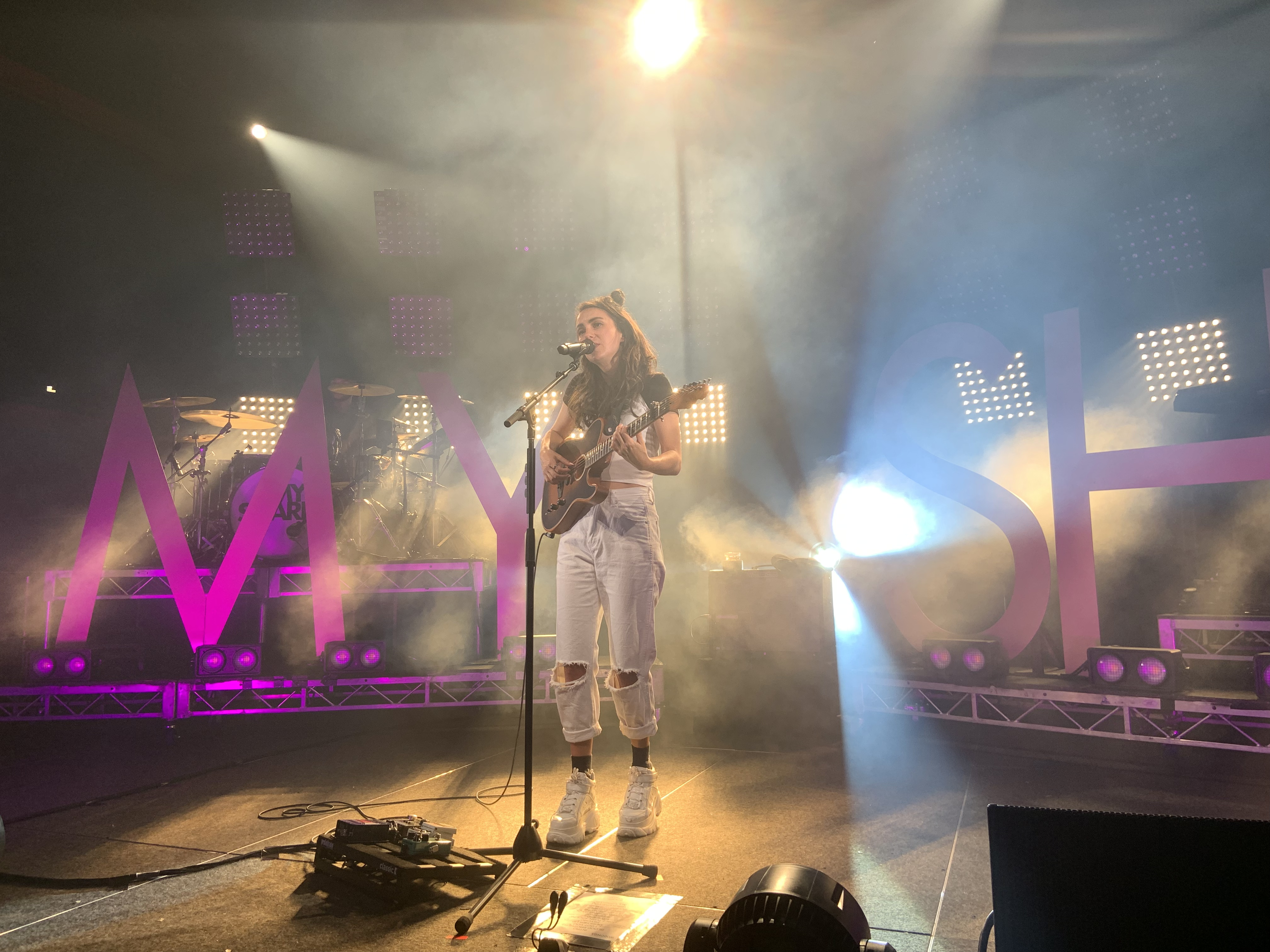
Shark performing at the Regional Australia Tour in Wodonga, Victoria, 2019

Headlining

- Love Monster Tour (2018)
- Australian Tour (2019)
- Regional Australia Tour (2019)
- Cry Forever Tour (2021–2022)
- See U Somewhere Tour (2022)
- Sunday Sadness Tour (2024)
- AJ2025 (2025)

Supporting

- Nostalgic for the Present Tour (Sia, 2017)
- Music of the Spheres World Tour (Coldplay, 2023)

== Awards and nominations ==
=== ARIA Music Awards ===
The ARIA Music Awards are a set of annual ceremonies presented by Australian Recording Industry Association (ARIA), which recognise excellence, innovation, and achievement across all genres of the music of Australia. They commenced in 1987. Amy Shark has won 8 awards from 38 nominations; at the 2018 ceremony she received 9 nominations and won 4, heading up the leader board for the year.

Year	Nominee / work	Award	Result	Ref.
2017	Night Thinker	Album of the Year	Nominated	
2017	Night Thinker	Best Female Artist	Nominated	
2017	Night Thinker	Best Pop Release	Won	
2017	Night Thinker	Breakthrough Artist	Won	
2017	"Drive You Mad"	Best Video	Nominated	
2017	"Adore"	Song of the Year	Nominated	
2018	Love Monster	Album of the Year	Won	
2018	Love Monster	Best Female Artist	Won	
2018	Love Monster	Best Pop Release	Won	
2018	"I Said Hi"	Song of the Year	Nominated	
2018	Nicholas Waterman for "I Said Hi"	Best Video	Nominated	
2018	Love Monster Tour	Best Australian Live Act	Nominated	
2018	Steve Wyper for Love Monster	Best Cover Art	Nominated	
2018	Dann Hume & M Phazes for "I Said Hi"	Engineer of the Year	Nominated	
2018	Dann Hume & M Phazes for "I Said Hi"	Producer of the Year	Won	
2019	"Mess Her Up"	Best Female Artist	Nominated	
2019	"Mess Her Up"	Best Pop Release	Nominated	
2019	"Mess Her Up"	Song of the Year	Nominated	
2019	Amy Shark Australian Tour	Best Australian Live Act	Nominated	
2020	"Everybody Rise"	Best Female Artist	Nominated	
2020	"Everybody Rise"	Best Pop Release	Won	
2020	Amy Shark Regional Tour	Best Australian Live Act	Won	
2021	Cry Forever	Album of the Year	Nominated	
2021	Cry Forever	Best Artist	Nominated	
2021	Cry Forever	Best Pop Release	Nominated	
2021	Cry Forever Tour 2021	Best Australian Live Act	Nominated	
2021	"Love Songs Ain't for Us" (featuring Keith Urban)	Song of the Year	Nominated	
2021	James Chappell for Amy Shark – "Love Songs Ain't for Us"	Video of the Year	Nominated	
2021	M-Phazes for Amy Shark – Cry Forever	Producer of the Year	Nominated	
2022	See U Somewhere Australia Tour 2022	Best Australian Live Act	Nominated	
2023	"Can I Shower at Yours"	Best Pop Release	Nominated	
2023	Mitch Green for Amy Shark – "Can I Shower at Yours"	Best Video	Nominated	
2023	"Sway My Way" (with R3hab)	Song of the Year	Nominated	
2024	Sunday Sadness	Album of the Year	Nominated	
2024	Sunday Sadness	Best Pop Release	Nominated	
2024	Sunday Sadness	Best Solo Artist	Nominated	
2024	"Beautiful Eyes" - Amy Shark, Marcario De Souza	Best Video	Nominated	
2026	Connor Dewhurst for Amy Shark – Soft Pop	Best Cover Art	Nominated	

=== APRA Awards ===
The APRA Awards are several award ceremonies run in Australia by the Australasian Performing Right Association (APRA) to recognise composing and song writing skills, sales and airplay performance by its members annually. Shark was nominated for three categories at the 2018 APRA Awards and at the 2019 awards.

Year	Nominee / work	Award	Result	Ref.
2017	"Adore" (Amy Billings p.k.a. Amy Shark, Mark Landon p.k.a. M-Phazes)	Song of the Year	Nominated	
2018	"Adore" (Amy Billings p.k.a. Amy Shark, Mark Landon p.k.a. M-Phazes)	Pop Work of the Year	Won	
2018	"Adore" (Amy Billings p.k.a. Amy Shark, Mark Landon p.k.a. M-Phazes)	Most Played Australian Work	Nominated	
2018	"Weekends" (Amy Billings p.k.a. Amy Shark)	Song of the Year	Nominated	
2019	"I Said Hi" (Amy Billings p.k.a. Amy Shark)	Pop Work of the Year	Won	
2019	"I Said Hi" (Amy Billings p.k.a. Amy Shark)	Most Played Australian Work	Nominated	
2019	"I Said Hi" (Amy Billings p.k.a. Amy Shark)	Song of the Year	Won	
2020	"All Loved Up" (Amy Billings p.k.a. Amy Shark, Jack Antonoff)	Most Performed Pop Work of the Year	Nominated	
2021	"Everybody Rise" (Amy Billings p.k.a. Amy Shark and Joel Little)	Song of the Year	Nominated	
2021	"Everybody Rise" (Amy Billings p.k.a. Amy Shark and Joel Little)	Most Performed Pop Work	Nominated	
2022	"C'Mon" (with Travis Barker)	Most Performed Alternative Work	Nominated	
2022	"Love Songs Ain't for Us" (with Keith Urban)	Most Performed Country Work	Won	
2024	"Can I Shower At Yours" (Amy Billings p.k.a. Amy Shark)	Song of the Year	Shortlisted	
2024	"Only Wanna Be With You" (Amy Billings p.k.a. Amy Shark), Grant Averill, Joseph Spargur)	Most Performed Australian Work	Nominated	
2024	"Only Wanna Be With You" (Amy Billings p.k.a. Amy Shark), Grant Averill, Joseph Spargur)	Most Performed Pop Work	Nominated	
2025	"Beautiful Eyes" (Amy Billings p.k.a. Amy Shark)	Song of the Year	Shortlisted	

=== Australian Women in Music Awards ===
The Australian Women in Music Awards is an annual event that celebrates outstanding women in the Australian Music Industry who have made significant and lasting contributions in their chosen field. They commenced in 2018.

Year	Nominee / work	Award	Result	Ref.
2018	Amy Shark	Breakthrough Artist Award	Won	

=== Country Music Awards of Australia ===
The Country Music Awards of Australia is an annual awards night typically held in January during the Tamworth Country Music Festival. Celebrating recording excellence in the Australian country music industry. They commenced in 1973.

Year	Nominee / work	Award	Result	Ref.
2022	"Love Songs Ain't for Us" (feat. Keith Urban)	(unknown)	Nominated	
2022	"Love Songs Ain't for Us" (feat. Keith Urban)	(unknown)	Nominated	

=== J Awards ===
The J Awards are an annual series of Australian music awards that were established by the Australian Broadcasting Corporation's youth-focused radio station Triple J. They commenced in 2005.

Year	Nominee / work	Award	Result	Ref.
2018	Love Monster	Australian Album of the Year	Nominated	

=== Logie Awards ===
The Logie Awards is an annual gathering to celebrate Australian television, sponsored and organised by the magazine TV Week.

Year	Nominee / work	Award	Result	Ref.
2023	Amy Shark	Graham Kennedy Award for Most Popular New Talent	Won	

=== MTV Europe Music Awards ===
The MTV Europe Music Awards is an award presented by Viacom International Media Networks to honour artists and music in pop culture.

Year	Nominee / work	Award	Result	Ref.
2018	herself	Best Australian Act	Nominated	

=== National Live Music Awards ===
The National Live Music Awards (NLMAs) are a broad recognition of Australia's diverse live industry, celebrating the success of the Australian live scene. The awards commenced in 2016.

Year	Nominee / work	Award	Result	Ref.
2017	Amy Shark	Live Act of the Year	Nominated	
2017	Amy Shark	Best New Act of the Year	Won	
2017	Amy Shark	Live Pop Act of the Year	Nominated	
2017	Amy Shark	Best Live Voice of the Year - People's Choice	Nominated	
2017	Amy Shark	Queensland Live Voice of the Year	Won	
2018	Amy Shark	Live Pop Act of the Year	Nominated	
2018	Amy Shark	International Live Achievement (Solo)	Nominated	
2018	Amy Shark	Best Live Voice of the Year - People's Choice	Nominated	
2018	Amy Shark	Queensland Live Voice of the Year	Won	
2019	Amy Shark	Live Pop Act of the Year	Nominated	
2023	Amy Shark	Best Pop Act	Nominated	

=== Queensland Music Awards ===
The Queensland Music Awards (known as Q Song Awards until 2010) are annual awards celebrating Queensland, Australia's brightest emerging artists and established legends. They commenced in 2006.

Year	Nominee / work	Award	Result	Ref.
2008	"Take Time Take Me" (Amy Cushway)	Alternative Song of the Year	Nominated	
2009	"Stupid not To" (Amy Cushway)	Q Music Encouragement	Nominated	
2013	"Weight of the World"	Regional Song of the Year	Nominated	
2016	"Golden Fleece"	Pop Song of the Year	Won	
2017	"Adore"	Song of the Year	Won	
2017	"Adore"	Pop Song of the Year	Won	
2017	"Adore"	Regional Song of the Year	Won	
2018	herself	Export Achievement Award	awarded	
2018	herself	Singer Songwriter	Won	
2018	"Adore"	Highest Selling Single of the Year	Won	
2018	"Weekends"	Pop Song of the Year	Won	
2018	"Weekends"	Regional Song of the Year	Won	
2019	"I Said Hi"	Highest Selling Single	Won	
2019	Love Monster	Highest Selling Album	Won	
2019	Amy Shark	Singer Songwriter	Won	
2020	"Mess Her Up"	Highest Selling Single	Won	
2021	"Everybody Rise"	Highest Selling Single	Won	
2022	Cry Forever	Highest Selling Album	Won	
2023	"Sway My Way" by Amy Shark & R3HAB	Highest Selling Single	Won	
2025	"Beautiful Eyes"	Highest Selling Single	Won	
2025	Sunday Sadness	Highest Selling Album	Won	

=== Rolling Stone Australia Awards ===
The Rolling Stone Australia Awards are awarded annually in January or February by the Australian edition of Rolling Stone magazine for outstanding contributions to popular culture in the previous year.

Year	Nominee / work	Award	Result	Ref.
2022	Cry Forever	Best Record	Nominated	
2022	"Baby Steps"	Best Single	Won	
2023	"Only Wanna Be with You"	Best Single	Nominated	
2024	"Can I Shower At Yours?"	Best Single	Nominated	
2025	Sunday Sadness	Best LP/EP	Shortlisted	
2025	Beautiful Eyes	Best Single	Shortlisted	

=== Vanda & Young Global Songwriting Competition ===
The Vanda & Young Global Songwriting Competition is an annual competition that "acknowledges great songwriting whilst supporting and raising money for Nordoff-Robbins" and is coordinated by Albert Music and APRA AMCOS. It commenced in 2009.

Year	Nominee / work	Award	Result	Ref.
2018	"Adore"	Vanda & Young Global Songwriting Competition	1st	
