= Evermore discography =

Band discography

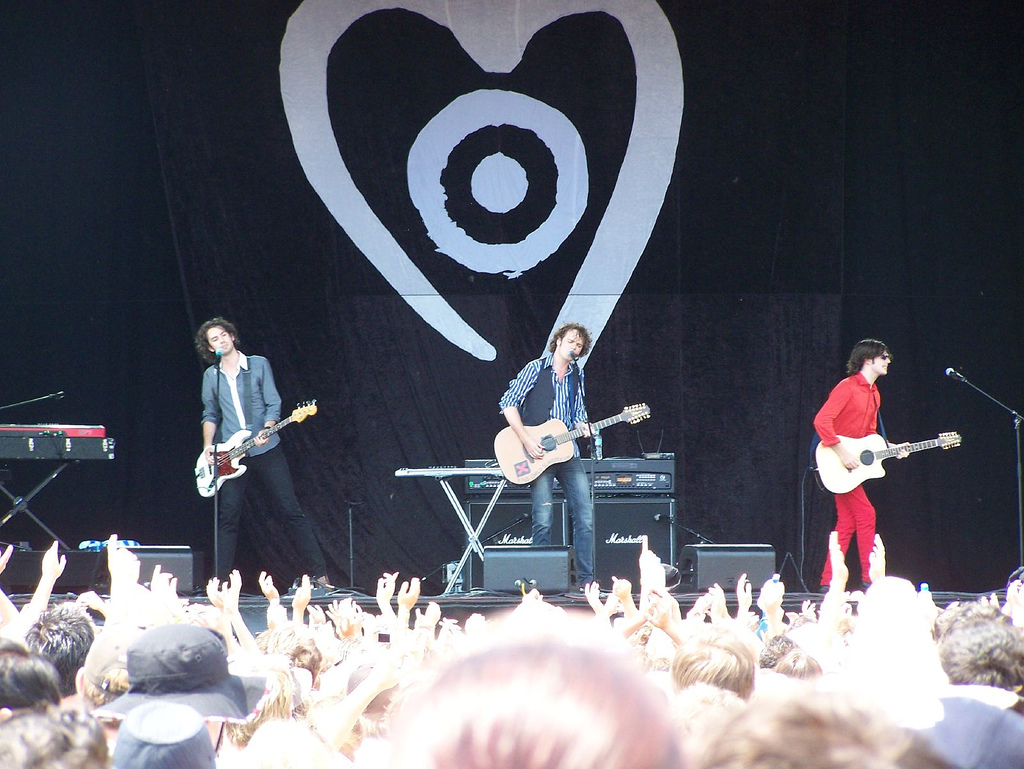
- Evermore performing at the Big Day Out, 2007.
- Studio albums: 4
- EPs: 6
- Compilation albums: 2
- Singles: 16
- Video albums: 1
- Music videos: 23

The discography of New Zealand indie rock band Evermore, consists of four studio albums, two compilation albums, six extended plays, sixteen singles, one video album and twenty three music videos.

== Albums ==
=== Studio albums ===
List of studio albums, with selected chart positions and certifications
Title	Album details	Peak chart positions		Certifications
Title	Album details	NZ	AUS	Certifications
Dreams	Released: 27 September 2004 (AU); Label: East West; Formats: CD, CD+DVD, digital download	30	15	ARIA: Platinum
Real Life	Released: 8 July 2006 (AU); Label: Warner; Formats: CD, digital download	2	5	ARIA: 2× Platinum; NZ: Platinum
Truth of the World: Welcome to the Show	Released: 20 March 2009 (AU); Label: Warner; Formats: CD, digital download	5	14	
Follow the Sun	Released: 12 October 2012 (AU); Label: Universal; Formats: CD, digital download	22	40	

=== Compilation albums ===
List of compilation albums, with selected chart positions
Title	Album details	Peak chart positions	
Title	Album details	NZ	AUS
From Dreams to Real Life	Released: 2007 (NZ); Label: Warner; Formats: CD	11	—
Evermore	Released: 12 March 2010 (AU); Label: Warner; Formats: CD, CD+DVD, digital download	22	30
"—" denotes items which were not released in that country or failed to chart.

== Extended plays ==
List of extended plays, with selected chart positions
Title	Details	Peak chart positions
Title	Details	NZ
Oil & Water EP	Released: 13 January 2003 (AU); Label: Warner; Formats: CD, digital download	23
My Own Way EP	Released: 15 September 2003 (AU); Label: East West; Formats: CD, digital download	—
Come to Nothing	Released: 23 May 2005 (AU); Label: East West, Warner; Formats: CD	—
Lakeside Sessions Vol.1 EP	Released: 20 December 2005; Label: Warner; Formats: Digital download	—
The Great Unknown EP	Released: 2007; Label: Warner; Formats: CD	—
Live at the Playroom	Released: 28 August 2007 (AU); Label: Warner; Formats: Digital download	—
"—" denotes items which were not released in that country or failed to chart.

== Singles ==
Title	Year	Peak chart positions			Certifications	Album
Title	Year	NZ	AUS	FRA	Certifications	Album
"Slipping Away"	2002	—	—	—		Oil & Water EP
"It's Too Late"	2004	—	16	—		Dreams
"For One Day"	2005	—	25	—		Dreams
"Come to Nothing"	2005	—	51	—		Dreams
"Running"	2006	4	5	—		Real Life
"It's Too Late" (Dirty South vs. Evermore)	2006	—	—	69		Dirty South EP
"Light Surrounding You"	2006	15	1	—	ARIA: Platinum	Real Life
"Unbreakable"	2007	28	53	—		Real Life
"Never Let You Go"	2007	—	29	—		Real Life
"Between the Lines"	2008	—	—	—		Truth of the World: Welcome to the Show
"Hey Boys and Girls (Truth of the World pt.2)"	2009	5	4	—	ARIA: Platinum	Truth of the World: Welcome to the Show
"Can You Hear Me?"	2009	—	—	—		Truth of the World: Welcome to the Show
"Underground"	2010	—	53	—		Evermore
"Follow the Sun"	2012	—	58	—		Follow the Sun
"Hero"	2013	—	—	—		Follow the Sun
"One Love"	2013	—	—	—		Non-album single
"—" denotes a recording that did not chart or was not released in that territory.

=== Promotional singles ===
Title	Year	Album
"Stand by Me" (Live at Make Poverty History Concert)	2006	—

== Other appearances ==
Title	Year	Album
"Relapse" (Little Birdy cover)	2006	Like a Version: Two
"Water into Wine" (Cold Chisel cover)	2007	Standing on the Outside: The Songs of Cold Chisel

== Videography ==
=== Video albums ===
Title	Album details
Into the Ocean (The Story So Far 1997 – 2005)	Released: 1 November 2005 (AU); Label: Warner; Formats: DVD

=== Music videos ===
Title	Year	Director(s)
"Slipping Away"	2003	
"Oil & Water"	2003	
"My Own Way"	2003	
"Hold On"	2003	
"It's Too Late"	2004	Sarah-Jane Woulahan and Sean Gilligan
"For One Day"	2005	Sarah-Jane Woulahan
"Come to Nothing"	2005	Sarah-Jane Woulahan and Sean Gilligan
"Dreams Call Out to Me"	2005	Mathematics
"Running"	2006	
"The Great Unknown"	2006	
"It's Too Late (Ride On)" (Dirty South vs. Evermore)	2006	
"Light Surrounding You"	2006	Michael Spiccia
"Unbreakable"	2007	Mathematics
"Never Let You Go"	2007	Nash Edgerton and Spencer Susser
"Between the Lines"	2008	Michael Spiccia
"Hey Boys and Girls (Truth of the World pt.2)"	2009	James Solomon
"Can You Hear Me?"	2009	Tristan Holmes
"Hey Boys and Girls (Truth of the World pt.2)" (International version)	2009	Tristan Holmes
"Underground"	2010	
"Follow the Sun"	2012	Prad Senanayake
"Hero"	2013	Tristan Holmes and Peter Hume
"Hey My Love"	2013	
"One Love"	2013	
