= Evermore (Evermore album) =

Greatest hits album by Evermore
- Released: 14 October 2009
- Recorded: Room 101, Dragonfly Studios, Melbourne, Australia
- Genres: Rock, electronic rock
- Label: Warner
- Producers: Jon Hume, Dann Hume

Evermore chronology
| Truth of the World: Welcome to the Show (2009) | Evermore (2009) | Follow the Sun (2012) |

Singles from Evermore
- 1. "Underground" Released: 19 February 2010

Evermore is a greatest hits album by New Zealand rock band Evermore released on 14 October 2009 in the UK and 12 March 2010 in Australia and New Zealand. The album is a collection of songs from the band's entire history, as well as three new songs including the single "Underground". It was the band's first album to be released in Europe, following a recording contract with Warner Bros. The new songs were written while the band was a supporting act for Pink's Funhouse Tour in Europe. Band member Jon Hume described the album as "a crazy mishmash of all the music that [Evermore has] made over the last seven or eight years".

The first single "Underground" was released to radio in late January 2010 and later as a digital download on 19 February 2010. The Australian and New Zealand release of the album came packaged with a limited edition DVD, featuring a live performance from the band filmed at the O_{2} Arena in London. The DVD also includes documentary footage of the band travelling around Europe with American pop singer Pink. The Irish and United Kingdom iTunes release of the album contains three remixes as bonus tracks.

Several of the singles from Truth of the World have been edited to eliminate the concept interludes from the original album, with some receiving newly recorded parts and altered music such as "Everybody's Doing It" receiving a new ending, "Hey Boys and Girls" receiving a new beginning (taken from the end of "Max Is Stable") and a re-recorded mid-verse, "Between the Lines" now having a new intro and the speech in the middle removed (the same as the radio edit).

== Track listing ==
All tracks are written by Evermore.

| No. | Title | Release year | Length |
|---|---|---|---|
| 1. | "Underground" | 2010 (new song) | 3:39 |
| 2. | "Hey Boys and Girls (Truth of the World pt.2)" (edit) | 2009 | 4:48 |
| 3. | "Running" | 2006 | 4:24 |
| 4. | "For One Day" | 2005 | 4:10 |
| 5. | "This Is Love" | 2010 (new song) | 4:34 |
| 6. | "Light Surrounding You" | 2006 | 3:56 |
| 7. | "Between the Lines" (edit) | 2008 | 4:11 |
| 8. | "It's Too Late (Ride On)" | 2004 | 3:58 |
| 9. | "Never Let You Go" | 2007 | 4:16 |
| 10. | "Everybody's Doing It" (edit) | 2009 | 4:38 |
| 11. | "Throwitaway" | 2010 (new song) | 3:40 |
| 12. | "Can You Hear Me?" (edit) | 2009 | 4:11 |
| 13. | "Unbreakable" | 2007 | 3:31 |
| 14. | "Front Page Story / Diamonds in the River" | 2009 | 5:23 |
| 15. | "Dreams Call Out to Me" | 2004 | 4:33 |
| Total length: | | | 63:52 |

Australia/New Zealand bonus Alive in Europe DVD
| No. | Title | Length |
|---|---|---|
| 1. | "Underground" (live) |
| 2. | "Between the Lines" (live) |
| 3. | "I'll Never Let You Go" (live) |
| 4. | "Light Surrounding You" (live) |
| 5. | "Front Page Story / Diamonds in the River" (live) |
| 6. | "Throwitaway" (live) |
| 7. | "Join the Party" (live interlude) |
| 8. | "Everybody's Doing It" (live) |
| 9. | "It's Too Late" (live) |
| 10. | "This Is Love" (live) |
| 11. | "Hey Boys and Girls" (recorded live at The O2 Arena (London) on P!NK's Funhouse Tour, 9 December 2009) |

UK release (14 October 2009)
| No. | Title | Release year | Length |
|---|---|---|---|
| 1. | "Hey Boys and Girls (Truth of the World pt.2)" (edit) | 2009 | 4:55 |
| 2. | "Between the Lines" (edit) | 2008 | 3:49 |
| 3. | "This Is Love" | 2009 (new song) | 4:32 |
| 4. | "Underground" | 2009 (new song) | 3:39 |
| 5. | "It's Too Late (Ride On)" (Amazon.co.uk shows runtime of 4:51) | 2004 | 3:55 |
| 6. | "Can You Hear Me?" | 2009 | 4:09 |
| 7. | "Everybody's Doing It" (edit) | 2009 | 4:42 |
| 8. | "Throwitaway" | 2009 (new song) | 3:38 |
| 9. | "Light Surrounding You" | 2006 | 3:59 |
| 10. | "Front Page Story / Diamonds in the River" | 2009 | 5:23 |
| 11. | "Girl with the World on Her Shoulders" | 2004 | 4:44 |
| Total length: | | | 48:22 |

UK release (October 2009) digital bonus tracks
| No. | Title | Length |
|---|---|---|
| 1. | "Light Surrounding You" (live) | 6:24 |
| 2. | "It's Too Late" (live) | 5:18 |
| 3. | "I'll Never Let You Go" (live) | 4:13 |
| Total length: | | 15:55 |

- The Australian DVD also contains clips of the band on the road in Europe in addition to the listed songs.
- Some versions of the UK release came with a digital booklet.

== Charts ==
| Chart (2010) | Peak position |
|---|---|
| Australian Albums (ARIA) | 30 |
| New Zealand Albums (RMNZ) | 22 |

== Personnel ==
- Jon Hume – vocals, guitars, percussion, synthesizers, programming, production
- Peter Hume – bass, keyboards, vocals, piano, synthesizers, programming
- Dann Hume – drums, vocals, guitars, piano, percussion, programming
