= Hey Boys and Girls (Truth of the World pt.2) =

Single by Evermore

from the album Truth of the World: Welcome to the Show
- Released: 3 February 2009
- Recorded: Room 101, Dragonfly Studios, Melbourne, Australia between July 2007 and Jan 2009
- Genre: Alternative rock, electropop, electronic rock
- Length: 5:48 (album version); 4:48 ("Evermore" album edit); 4:11 (radio edit)
- Label: Warner; AATW (UK)
- Songwriter(s): Evermore
- Producer(s): Jon Hume, Dann Hume

Evermore singles chronology
"Between the Lines" (2008)	"Hey Boys and Girls (Truth of the World pt.2)" (2009)	"Can You Hear Me?" (2009)

"Hey Boys and Girls (Truth of the World pt.2)" is the second single by Evermore, from their third studio album Truth of the World: Welcome to the Show.

It was also released as the group's first single in the UK in late 2009 (to promote their first international album, Evermore), but did not chart.

== Track listing ==
All tracks are written by Evermore.

iTunes single
No.	Title	Length
1.	"Hey Boys and Girls (Truth of the World, Pt. 2)"	5:28
Total length:		5:28

CD single
No.	Title	Length
1.	"Hey Boys and Girls (Truth of the World pt.2)"	5:29
2.	"So Many Things"	3:11
3.	"Hey Boys and Girls" (TV Rock Remix)	7:10
4.	"Hey Boys and Girls" (Retrofuture Remix)	5:20
5.	"Hey Boys and Girls (Truth of the World pt.2)" (radio edit)	4:11
Total length:		25:17

== Chart performance ==
The song was the band's third top 5 single on the ARIA Singles Chart in Australia, peaking at No. 4. It is also their second-highest charting single in Australia behind "Light Surrounding You", which topped the ARIA Singles Chart in 2007.

Chart (2009)	Peak position
ARIA Singles Chart	4
New Zealand Singles Chart	3

=== Year-end charts ===
Chart (2009)	Position
Australia (ARIA)	35
New Zealand Singles Chart	48

== Music video ==
The video opens with a boy by the name of 'Max' (holding up a bottle of pills that says "TRUTHOGEN"), who turns on the television showing the band in a dark room with about 200 dark blue TVs. The music starts playing and the TV shows dancers including soldiers, pink haired women and women in raincoats. When the chorus starts to come in, the lead singer (Jon, wearing a top-hat) starts looking happy and the dancers start to dance. The breakdown comes the camera (screen) zooms out of the TV and shows the boy watching the TV. The camera zooms back in and the dancers are dancing again. Jon is then seen without a microphone stand (just a microphone) looking excited about something and the bassist Peter doing backup video. When the video ends, the dancers run in on the band and pick them up. They begin throwing the band members around. Jon takes off his hat and throws it. The band disappears and the boy turns the TV off.

The band also shot a second video for the song for release in European markets.

== Meaning ==
During a radio interview, lead singer Jon Hume stated "The song is just like the meaning of the album - it's just all about crazy over the top media (that) we, you know, read, see on TV. It's just having a bit of fun and having a laugh about it."

== Personnel ==
- Jon Hume – lead and backing vocals, guitar, percussion
- Peter Hume – synthesizers, piano, bass, backing vocals, percussion
- Dann Hume – lead and backing vocals, drums, guitar, percussion

== Release history ==
Region	Date	Label	Format	Catalogue
Australia	3 February 2009	Warner	Digital download	
Australia	27 February 2009	Warner	CD	5186531452
Ireland	17 October 2009	AATW	Digital download	

== Certifications ==
Region	Certification	Certified units/sales
New Zealand (RMNZ)	Gold	7,500^{*}
^{*} Sales figures based on certification alone.
