= My Own Way EP =

EP by Evermore
- Released: 15 September 2003
- Recorded: 2003
- Studio: Studios 301, Sydney
- Genre: Pop rock
- Length: 20:47
- Label: East West, Warner
- Producer: Jon Hume

Evermore chronology
Soil & Water EP (2003)	My Own Way EP (2003)	Dreams (2004)

My Own Way EP is the third extended play (EP) by Evermore, which was released on 15 September 2003. Evermore made two music videos for tracks on the five-track EP, "Hold Off" and "My Own Way". Although it did not reache the top 100 of the ARIA Singles chart, it reached No. 11 on the related ARIA Hitseekers Singles chart. It was recorded with the line-up of Jon Hume on guitars and vocals; Dann Hume on drums and vocals and Peter Hume on bass guitar, keyboards and vocals. The three brothers wrote all the tracks. They supported its release with their third tour of Australia within two years.

== Track listing ==
All tracks are written by Jon Hume, Dann Hume, Peter Hume.

My Own Way EP
No.	Title	Length
1.	"Hold Off"	4:05
2.	"My Own Way"	5:40
3.	"What's Inside"	3:50
4.	"The Same"	4:34
5.	"You're So Fine"	2:38

== Personnel ==
Evermore

- Jon Hume – vocals, guitar, bass guitar, producer, mixing engineer
- Peter Hume – bass guitar, keyboards, vocals, artwork
- Dann Hume – drums, percussion, guitar, vocals, artwork

Additional personnel

- Kalju Tonuma – mixing engineer
- Steve Smart – mastering engineer

== Release history ==
Region	Date	Label	Format	Catalogue
Australia	15 September 2003	East West, Warner	CD, Digital download	2564609522
