= Unbreakable (Evermore song) =

2007 single by Evermore

"Unbreakable Live EP"

Single by Evermore

from the album Real Life
- Released: 3 March 2007
- Length: 3:28
- Label: Warner Music
- Composer: Dann Hume
- Lyricists: Dann Hume; Jon Hume
- Producers: Jon Hume; John Alagía

Evermore singles chronology
"Light Surrounding You" (2006)	"Unbreakable Live EP" (2007)	"Never Let You Go" (2007)

"Unbreakable" is the third single by Evermore, taken from their second studio album Real Life. The single was released as the Unbreakable Live EP. The single peaked at number 53 on the Australian Singles Chart and number 28 on the New Zealand Singles Chart.

== Music video ==
The video for "Unbreakable" was shot at various concerts during the Coca-Cola live tour. The video is also shot on black and white film, with outrageous fans waving banners and cheering in the crowd. The video also shows the band members having a good time while travelling around on their Australian/New Zealand tour.

== Track listing ==
All tracks are written by Evermore.

CD single and iTunes EP
No.	Title	Length
1.	"Unbreakable"	3:15
2.	"Real Life" (live)	4:33
3.	"It's Too Late" (live)	5:17
4.	"Unbreakable" (live)	3:12
5.	"Running" (live)	5:09
6.	"Light Surrounding You" (live; bonus track; iTunes Australia)	6:23

== Personnel ==
- Jon Hume – lead vocals, lead guitar, percussion
- Peter Hume – keyboards, bass guitar
- Dann Hume – rhythm guitar, piano, drums, percussion, backing vocals

== Charts ==
Chart (2007)	Peak position
Australia (ARIA)	53
New Zealand (Recorded Music NZ)	28

== Release history ==
Region	Date	Format(s)	Label	Catalogue
Australia	3 March 2007	CD, digital download	Warner	5101187862
Australia	3 March 2007	CD, digital download	Warner	5101198112
