= Truth of the World: Welcome to the Show =

Studio album by Evermore
- Released: 20 March 2009
- Recorded: Room 101, Dragonfly Studios, Melbourne, Australia between July 2007 and Jan 2009
- Genres: Rock, electronic rock
- Length: 62:43
- Label: Warner
- Producers: Jon Hume, Dann Hume

Evermore chronology
Real Life (2006)	Truth of the World: Welcome to the Show (2009)	Evermore (2009)

Singles from Truth of the World: Welcome to the Show
- 1. "Between the Lines" Released: 10 November 2008; 2. "Hey Boys and Girls (Truth of the World pt.2)" Released: 3 February 2009; 3. "Can You Hear Me?" Released: 11 May 2009

Professional ratings
Review scores
Source	Rating
Rave Magazine	3.5/5 stars
Otago Daily Times	4/5 stars
Access All Areas	(positive)

Truth of the World: Welcome to the Show is the third studio album by Evermore, released on 20 March 2009. The album is a concept album about trash media, political propaganda, advertising and infotainment.

Three singles have been released from the album – "Between the Lines", "Hey Boys and Girls (Truth of the World pt.2)" and "Can You Hear Me?". From 15 to 20 March 2009, the entire album was available to stream on the band's MySpace page.

== Production ==
Truth of the World: Welcome to the Show was recorded at the band's own studio in Melbourne and took 18 months to complete. The album is described by Jon Hume as a concept album that "takes inspiration from trash entertainment, news headlines and political propaganda, and turns it into an over the top, fun, rock'n'roll show."

Describing the aim of the album, Jon said, "I heard someone say that albums were dead… and everyone just wants three-minute songs these days. That's exactly what we are trying to fight with this record. We hit reset on what this band was about, threw everything out and just imagined the record we would want to hear someone else make." "I think we just wanted to challenge ourselves and explore something new as a band. A concept album is something we've wanted to do for a really long time", said Jon.

Jon was initially working on songs about a young man who disappears but Dann had difficulty writing songs for the story and characters. "He just didn't get it. But then he came up with this idea of having news reports coming in between songs and as soon as he said that we went off on this tangent of TV shows, newspapers, ad breaks, and all this product people were trying to sell. It turned into this crazy, over-the-top idea that took on a life of its own", said Jon.

The album was influenced by Ray Bradbury's 1953 novel Fahrenheit 451 as well as visits to the United States and United Kingdom. The band watched American news channels and read trashy tabloid stories to get ideas. The album contains sound bites from John F. Kennedy ("Between the Lines"), Hitler ("Everybody's Doing It") and a line from the Charlie Chaplin movie The Great Dictator.

== "Truth of the World" Australian tour 2009 ==
The band toured Australia nationwide from May through to July 2009 in support of the new album with End of Fashion as special guests and up and coming Adelaide band The Sundance Kids as show openers. Evermore unveiled a new high-tech live setup backed by a wall of television screens featuring a barrage of images and news-ticker style lyrics. Jon Hume, Evermore's lead singer and guitarist stated in an interview about the live shows:

We're going to take these screens that we used in the Between the Lines clip on the road with us, so we want to get quite a cinematic feeling to the show, and in a way expand on the story elements and the ideas on the record in a visual sense as well.

— Jon Hume

== Track listing ==
All tracks are written by Evermore.

No.	Title	Length
1.	"Plugged In"	3:54
2.	"Tonight on the Show (Truth of the World pt.1)"	5:02
3.	"Between the Lines"	4:59
4.	""Max Is Stable""	4:22
5.	"Hey Boys and Girls (Truth of the World pt.2)"	5:48
6.	"The Lonely Ones"	3:17
7.	"Girl with the World on Her Shoulders"	5:21
8.	"Front Page Story / Diamonds in the River"	6:33
9.	"Infotainmentology (Truth of the World pt.3)"	4:23
10.	"Join the Party"	2:09
11.	"Everybody's Doing It"	5:56
12.	"Chemical Miracle / Faster"	5:20
13.	"Can You Hear Me?"	6:43
14.	"The Watchmen Are Sleeping" (Demo; Bonus Track; Australia iTunes)	3:22
15.	"Hey Boys and Girls" (Diamond Cut Remix; Bonus Track; Australia iTunes)	6:32
16.	"The Lifeline" (Demo; Bonus Track; Australia iTunes Pre-order Only)	3:24
17.	"Between the Lines" (Music Video; Bonus Track; Australia iTunes)	5:31
Total length:		62:43

== Personnel ==
- Jon Hume – vocals, guitars, synthesizers, percussion, programming, production, concept
- Peter Hume – bass, keyboards, synthesizers, piano, vocals, vocoder, programming, percussion, artwork
- Dann Hume – drums, vocals, guitars, piano, percussion, programming, production, concept, artwork

== Charts ==
Chart (2009)	Peak position
Australian Albums (ARIA)	15
New Zealand Albums (RMNZ)	5

== Release history ==
Region	Date	Label	Format	Catalogue
Australia	20 March 2009	Warner	CD, Digital download	5186531142
Australia	20 March 2009	Warner	CD, Digital download	5186533795
