= Come to Nothing =

Single by Evermore

from the album Dreams
- Released: 23 May 2005
- Recorded: November 2003 – May 2004
- Studio: Red Sky Studio, New Zealand; Laundry Room Studio, Seattle
- Genre: Alternative rock
- Length: 4:20
- Label: East West, Warner
- Songwriter(s): Peter Hume, Dann Hume
- Producer(s): Barrett Jones, John Alagía

Evermore singles chronology
"For One Day" (2005)	"Come to Nothing" (2005)	"Running" (2006)

"Come to Nothing" is the third single by Evermore, taken from their debut album, Dreams. It was released in May 2005 and peaked at No. 51 on the ARIA Singles Chart. It appeared as a split single on CD with two live music videos by Evermore, "It's Too Late" and "Come to Nothing"; and a track each by theredsunband: "Devil Song, the Panda Band: "Eyelashes", and the Vasco Era: "Don't Go to Sleep".

== Reception ==
Greg Prato of AllMusic, in his review of the album, described how "Evermore has yet to find their own sound and approach, as evidenced by many tracks that sound like they could have easily been plucked from either Absolution or The Bends – especially 'It's Too Late' and 'Come to Nothing.' IGN's Chad Grischow observed, "The sloppy rocker, 'Come to Nothing' is the first track on the album that does not quite sound up to par; marking the beginning of the decline on the album." Robyn Gallagher of 5000 Ways analysed the related music video, "[it is] heavy-handed with symbolism, putting Jon and his bros into a derelict, fire-gutted house. We also see a young woman wandering the same house, but staying well away from Evermore. Just as well. It seems they have some issues... [it] is shot in desaturated colours, creating a gloomy world where a relationship break-up feels like the least awful thing that could happen in an average day."

== Track listing ==
"Come to Nothing" – EastWest (5046781662), Warner Music (5046781662)
No.	Title	Writer(s)	Performer	Length
1.	"Come to Nothing"	Peter Hume, Dann Hume	Evermore	4:25
2.	"Devil Song"	John Matthews, Sarah Kelly	theredsunband	2:27
3.	"Eyelashes"	David Namour, Damian Crosbie	The Panda Band	3:54
4.	"Don't Go to Sleep"	Sidney O'Neil, Edward O'Neil, Michael Fitzgerald	The Vasco Era	2:54
5.	"It's Too Late" (Live music video from Big Day Out, 2005)	P Hume, D Hume	Evermore	4:50
6.	"Come to Nothing" (Live music video from Big Day Out, 2005)	P Hume, D Hume	Evermore	3:54
Total length:				22:34

== Personnel ==
Evermore

- Jon Hume – vocals, guitars
- Peter Hume – keyboards, piano, bass, vocals
- Dann Hume – drums, percussion, vocals

theredsunband

- Elizabeth Kelly – keyboards, keyboard bass
- Sarah Kelly – lead guitar, vocals
- John Matthews – drums

the Panda Band

- David Namour – bass guitar
- Stephen Callan – keyboards
- Chris Callan – guitar, backing vocals
- Scott Lee Howard – drums, percussion
- Damian Crosbie – lead vocals, guitar

the Vasco Era

- Sid O'Neil – vocals, guitar, lapsteel, rototoms
- Ted O'Neil – bass guitar
- Michael Fitzgerald – drums

== Release history ==
Region	Date	Label	Format	Catalogue
Australia	23 May 2005	East West, Warner	CD, Digital download	5046781662
