= Speed of Life =

Speed of Life may refer to:

- "Speed of Life" (David Bowie song), an instrumental from David Bowie's 1977 album Low
- Speed of Life (Nitty Gritty Dirt Band album), 2009
- Speed of Life (Adam Brand album), 2020
- Speed of Life, a 2012 album by The Christians
- Speed of Life (Dirty South album), 2013
- Speed of Life (TV series) a 2016 television drama produced by TVB
