= Light Surrounding You =

2006 single by Evermore

Single by Evermore

from the album Real Life
- Released: 14 October 2006
- Genre: Alternative rock
- Length: 3:50
- Label: Warner Music
- Songwriter: Dann Hume
- Producers: Jon Hume; John Alagía

Evermore singles chronology
"It's Too Late (Ride on)" (2006)	"Light Surrounding You" (2006)	"Unbreakable" (2007)

"Light Surrounding You" is a song by alternative rock band Evermore, released as the second single from their second studio album, Real Life (June 2006). It was written by Dann Hume, the group's drummer. The record is co-produced by Jon Hume. The song was released in October 2006 and peaked at No. 15 on New Zealand's RIANZ Singles Chart as well as No. 1 on Australia's ARIA Singles Chart, making it Evermore's most successful single in Australia. It was the first single by a New Zealand artist to top the Australian charts since "How Bizarre" by OMC in 1996.

Dann Hume explained that the song is about "someone who had all the potential in the world but they didn’t believe in themselves". The music video features Australian actress Emily Browning. The song was used as a tribute to the leaving of Home and Away's long-term character Sally, portrayed by Kate Ritchie, in the 2006 season finale. It was earlier used for the Channel Ten series premiere of American show, Jericho. In New Zealand it was used in TV One's on-air identity package.

== Background ==
The song was released on 14 October 2006 from their second album, Real Life, which was earlier released on the Warner label on 8 July 2006. The single peaked at No. 15 on the RIANZ Singles Chart in New Zealand. Drummer Dann Hume composed much of the music for the song on a piano. It reached No. 1 on the ARIA Singles Chart in Australia. It was the second song released from the album; whilst "Light Surrounding You" became Evermore's first number-one single in Australia, their first single "Running" remained their highest-charting New Zealand hit.

== Track listing ==
CD single / iTunes EP
No.	Title	Writer(s)	Length
1.	"Light Surrounding You"	Dann Hume	3:55
2.	"Waves on the Sun"	Jon Hume	4:05
3.	"All Day and All of the Night"	Ray Davies	3:25
4.	"Sun Down"	Dann Hume Jon Hume	2:50

== Music video ==
- Channel Seven Version: Channel Seven released the song as a tribute video for Kate Ritchie's character Sally Fletcher.

== Personnel ==
- Jon Hume – vocals, lead and rhythm guitars
- Peter Hume – piano, keyboards, bass guitar, backing vocals
- Dann Hume – drums, rhythm and acoustic guitars, backing vocals

== Charts ==
=== Weekly charts ===
Chart (2006–2007)	Peak position
Australia (ARIA)	1
New Zealand (Recorded Music NZ)	15

=== Year-end charts ===
Chart (2006)	Position
Australia (ARIA)	40
Chart (2007)	Position
Australia (ARIA)	36

== Certifications ==
Region	Certification	Certified units/sales
Australia (ARIA)	Platinum	70,000^{^}
New Zealand (RMNZ)	Platinum	30,000^{‡}
^{^} Shipments figures based on certification alone.^{‡} Sales+streaming figures based on certification alone.

== Release history ==
Region	Date	Label	Format	Catalogue
Australia	14 October 2006	Warner	CD, digital download	5101165472
Australia	14 October 2006	Warner	CD, digital download	5101165475

== See also ==
- List of number-one singles in Australia in 2007
