= Never Let You Go (Evermore song) =

2007 single by Evermore

Single by Evermore

from the album Real Life
- Released: 16 May 2007
- Length: 4:20
- Label: Warner Music
- Songwriter: Jon Hume
- Producers: Jon Hume; John Alagía

Evermore singles chronology
| "Unbreakable" (2007) | "Never Let You Go" (2007) | "Between the Lines" (2008) |

"Never Let You Go" is a song by New Zealand rock band Evermore, released as the fourth single from their second studio album, Real Life (2006). It reached number 29 on the Australian Singles Chart.

== Music video ==
The video of the single is of a series of clips of that show the meaning of the lyrics of being sung. The band appears throughout the video in blackface in one scene and at the end. For example, when "GET" is said during the song, a picture of a 'GOT' sign appears. During the music video the Hume brothers (Jonn, Dann and Petey) are not seen performing or in any pictures. However, the brothers are in the video: in the center section three scientists are seen that have a shocking similarity to the brothers, secondly, Evermore is spotted dressed as lower-class men sitting together. They really are lower class now. In one scene they are shown shaking hands with Jar Jar Binks from Star Wars.

== Track listing ==
All tracks are written by Evermore.

CD single and iTunes EP
| No. | Title | Length |
|---|---|---|
| 1. | "Never Let You Go" | 4:19 |
| 2. | "It's Too Late" (Dirty South) | 6:35 |
| 3. | "Running" (The Potbelleez remix) | 7:33 |
| 4. | "My Guiding Light" (Norman Pow! remix) | 9:14 |
| 5. | "Running" (Sneaky Sound System remix) | 3:26 |

== Charts ==
| Chart (2007) | Peak position |
|---|---|
| Australia (ARIA) | 29 |

== Release history ==
| Region | Date | Format(s) | Label | Catalogue |
|---|---|---|---|---|
| Australia | 16 May 2007 | CD, digital download | Warner Music | 5144214322 |
