= Real Life (Evermore album) =

Studio album by Evermore
- Released: 8 July 2006
- Recorded: 2005–2006 at Longview Farm Recording Studios, Massachusetts and The Village Recording Studios, Los Angeles
- Genre: Rock
- Length: 49:55
- Label: Warner
- Producers: Jon Hume, John Alagía

Evermore chronology
| Dreams (2004) | Real Life (2006) | Truth of the World: Welcome to the Show (2009) |

Singles from Real Life
- 1. "Running" Released: 3 June 2006; 2. "Light Surrounding You" Released: 14 October 2006; 3. "Unbreakable" Released: 3 March 2007; 4. "Never Let You Go" Released: 16 May 2007

Real Life is the second studio album by Evermore, released on 8 July 2006. It debuted on the ARIA Charts at number five and on the Recording Industry Association of New Zealand charts at number two. It reached double-platinum certification in Australia. Four singles were released: "Running", "Light Surrounding You", "Unbreakable" and "Never Let You Go".

== Production ==
The band wrote and recorded demos for the album at their Central Coast home studio in New South Wales, Australia. This time around, all three brothers had an input on the songwriting with everyone working on their songs individually before bringing them together for the final polish. Jon and Dann collectively wrote around 50 songs. All of the music was written on guitars and piano.

After two months, the band flew to Easton, Maryland in the United States where they met up with engineer John Alagía who the band worked with on Dreams. The band chose to work John Alagía because they knew he would let them get on with the job. "To be honest, we did nearly all of it without him," says Jon. "We basically worked with him because we had to - the record company wouldn't allow us to do it all ourselves."

After some preproduction work, the band headed to Massachusetts where they recorded at Longview Farm, the oldest recording studio still operating in the US and where artists such as Jimi Hendrix, The Rolling Stones and Aerosmith have recorded. The album was also recorded at The Village Recording Studios in Los Angeles and was mixed by Grammy Award winning engineer Tom Lord-Alge in Miami.

== Reception ==
The Age reviewer Michael Dwyer described Real Life as "a roller-coaster of intense gestures and hollow sentiments", criticising the album's "overwrought drama" and lack of restraint. Bernard Zuel of The Sydney Morning Herald said the album showed a lack of ambition, and said the most disappointing thing about it was not that it failed, but that "you suspect this is exactly what it was meant to sound like". He complained about the lack of excitement on the album, compared to Dreams.

== Track listing ==
Real Life
| No. | Title | Writer(s) | Length |
|---|---|---|---|
| 1. | "Real Life" | J. Hume, P. Hume, D . Hume | 4:36 |
| 2. | "Running" | D. Hume | 4:23 |
| 3. | "Light Surrounding You" | D. Hume | 3:51 |
| 4. | "Unbreakable" | D. Hume, J. Hume | 3:28 |
| 5. | "Morning Star" | P. Hume | 3:15 |
| 6. | "Never Let You Go" | J. Hume | 4:16 |
| 7. | "My Guiding Light" | D. Hume, J. Hume, J. Hamilton | 4:07 |
| 8. | "Afloat" | J. Hume | 5:28 |
| 9. | "The Great Unknown" | J. Hume | 4:29 |
| 10. | "The Only One I See" | J. Hume | 5:02 |
| 11. | "Inside of Me" | P. Hume | 4:30 |
| 12. | "Goodnight Is Not the End" | D. Hume | 2:32 |

Australian iTunes Store bonus tracks
| No. | Title | Writer(s) | Length |
|---|---|---|---|
| 13. | "If I Could" | D. Hume | 4:26 |
| 14. | "The Great Unknown" (video) | J. Hume | 4:23 |

== Charts ==
=== Weekly charts ===
| Chart (2006–07) | Peak position |
|---|---|
| Australian Albums (ARIA) | 5 |
| New Zealand Albums (RMNZ) | 2 |

=== Year-end charts ===
| Chart (2006) | Position |
|---|---|
| Australian (ARIA) | 43 |
| Chart (2007) | Position |
| Australian (ARIA) | 76 |

== Certifications ==
| Region | Certification | Certified units/sales |
|---|---|---|
| Australia (ARIA) | 2× Platinum | 140,000^{^} |
| New Zealand (RMNZ) | Platinum | 15,000^{^} |
^{^} Shipments figures based on certification alone.

== Personnel ==
- Jon Hume – vocals, guitars, percussion
- Peter Hume – vocals, bass, keyboards, piano, artwork
- Dann Hume – vocals, drums, guitars, piano, percussion
- Julian Hamilton - keyboards on "My Guiding Light"

== Release history ==
| Region | Date | Label | Format | Catalogue |
|---|---|---|---|---|
| Australia | 8 July 2006 | Warner | CD, digital download | 5101142122 |
