= Between the Lines (Evermore song) =

Single by Evermore

from the album Truth of the World: Welcome to the Show
- Released: 10 November 2008
- Recorded: Room 101, Dragonfly Studios, Melbourne, Australia between July 2007 and January 2009
- Genre: Alternative rock, electropop
- Length: 4:59 (album version); 4:22 (radio edit); 5:16 (single version)
- Label: Warner
- Songwriter(s): Evermore
- Producer(s): Jon Hume

Evermore singles chronology
"Never Let You Go" (2007)	"Between the Lines" (2008)	"Hey Boys and Girls (Truth of the World pt.2)" (2009)

"Between the Lines" is the first single by Evermore, taken from their third studio album Truth of the World: Welcome to the Show. Evermore's Jon Hume said that "Between the Lines was the first song to come out of a search for a new musical experience as a band." It was released as a free download on Evermore's official website on 10 November 2008.

The song failed to chart in Australia and New Zealand as it was not physically released as a single by the band; it was more of a teaser of the band's new musical direction on their new album. The song, however, has become a favourite amongst fans and is now a staple song in the band's live setlist.

== Music video ==
A music video has been made for the single. The band stated that they had grown tired of miming in their previous music videos, and therefore, they made this video such that the audio you hear was recorded whilst the video was shot.

The TV screens shown in the back of shot are being used again by the band as part of their new high-tech live setup that they are taking with them to every show on their current Australian tour.

== Track listing ==
All tracks are written by Evermore

Free single
No.	Title	Length
1.	"Between the Lines"	5:16

iTunes single 1
No.	Title	Length
1.	"Between the Lines" (Radio edit)	4:22

iTunes single 2
No.	Title	Length
1.	"Between the Lines" (radio edit)	4:22
2.	"Between the Lines" (Mind Electric Remix)	8:11

== Release history ==
Region	Date	Label	Format	Catalogue
Australia	10 November 2008	Warner	Digital download	
Australia	22 November 2008	Warner	Digital download	

== Personnel ==
- Jon Hume – vocals, guitar, programming
- Peter Hume – bass, keyboards, synthesizers, programming
- Dann Hume – drums, piano, percussion
