= Follow the Sun (Evermore album) =

Studio album by Evermore
- Released: 12 October 2012
- Recorded: The Stables Recording Studio, Melbourne, Australia
- Genre: Alternative rock; folk rock
- Length: 47:22
- Label: Universal
- Producer: Jon Hume; Simon Holmes

Evermore chronology
Evermore (2010)	Follow the Sun (2012)

Singles from Follow the Sun
- 1. "Follow the Sun" Released: 24 August 2012; 2. "Hero" Released: 18 January 2013

Follow the Sun is the fourth studio album by Evermore, which was released on 12 October 2012. The album was partly recorded using a portable studio during a world trip. Two singles, "Follow the Sun" and "Hero", have been released.

== Tour ==
The band embarked on a short Australian tour in anticipation of the new album, as well as appearing as a support act for Maroon 5's Australian tour.

== Track listing ==
All tracks are written by Evermore

No.	Title	Length
1.	"Shines on Everyone"	4:52
2.	"Follow the Sun"	4:13
3.	"A World Without You"	3:50
4.	"Hero"	4:00
5.	"Run Away"	3:15
6.	"Hey My Love"	3:39
7.	"Pieces"	3:40
8.	"That's the Way"	4:57
9.	"Sometimes It's Easy"	4:33
10.	"We Will Meet Again"	5:28
11.	"We'll Fly"	4:55
Total length:		47:22

=== Bonus tracks ===
iTunes Deluxe Edition
No.	Title	Length
12.	"If I Fall"	4:17
13.	"Close Your Eyes"	3:57
14.	"Release Me"	4:50
15.	"The Writing of Follow the Sun Documentary" (Video)	4:56

Follow the Heart; deluxe bonus EP
No.	Title	Length
1.	"Beautiful"	6:24
2.	"Draw Me into the Flame"	4:00
3.	"Honey Please Believe"	3:12
4.	"More Than Anyone"	4:03
5.	"Night Is Over"	3:36

== Personnel ==
- Jon Hume – lead vocals, electric and acoustic guitars, ukulele, piano, drums, percussion, production
- Peter Hume – bass guitar, piano, keyboards, vocals, mandolin, ukulele, accordion, acoustic guitar
- Dann Hume – electric and acoustic guitars, vocals, drums, percussion, piano

== Charts ==
Chart (2012)	Peak position
Australian Albums (ARIA)	40
