= Evermore (band) =

New Zealand rock band

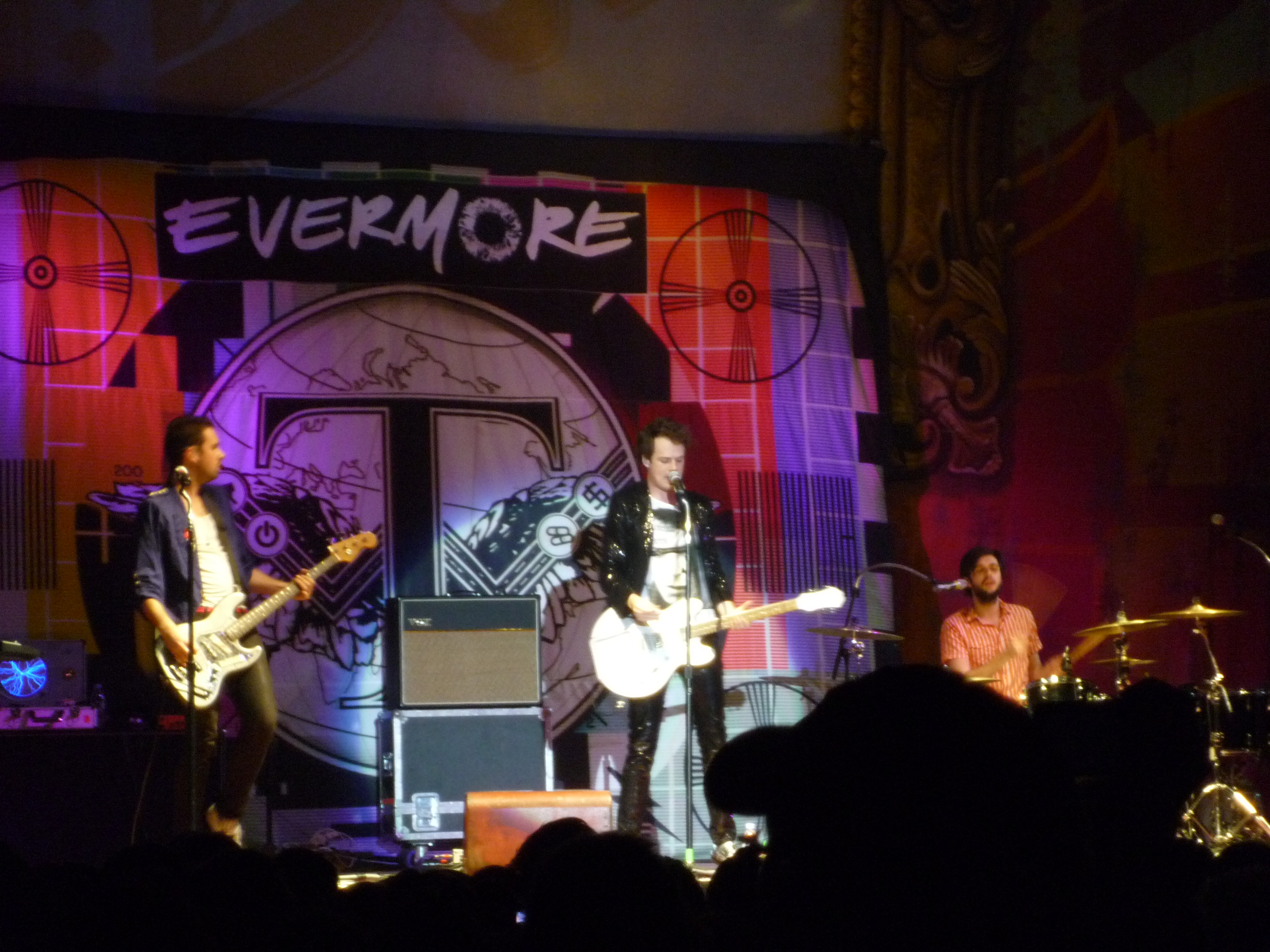
- Evermore: (left to right) Peter Hume, Jon Hume, Dann Hume Freiburg, Germany, November 2009

Background information
- Also known as: Electro
- Origin: Feilding, New Zealand
- Genres: Pop rock; indie rock; electronic rock
- Years active: 1999–2014
- Labels: East West; Warner; Universal
- Past members: Dann Hume; Jon Hume; Peter Hume; Richard Higham

Evermore were a rock band formed in Feilding, New Zealand, in 1999, made up of three brothers Jon (guitar, vocals), Peter (keyboards, bass guitar, vocals) and Dann Hume (drums, guitar, vocals). The band was based in Sydney from 2004 to 2007 and then Melbourne until they became inactive in 2014. Evermore released four studio albums: Dreams (2004), Real Life (2006), Truth of the World: Welcome to the Show (2009), and Follow the Sun (2012), as well as a self-titled compilation album (2010). Real Life and Truth of the World were their highest-charting studio albums in New Zealand and Australia, while Dreams and Real Life received platinum certifications from Australian Recording Industry Association (ARIA).

Evermore's most successful singles were "Running", "Light Surrounding You" (both 2006) and "Hey Boys and Girls (Truth of the World pt.2)" (2009) – "Light Surrounding You" peaked at number one in Australia. They were nominated for seven ARIA Music Awards and won two New Zealand Music Awards. The group's members won an APRA Silver Scroll song writing award and the Channel V Oz Artist of the Year Award. Evermore have not performed publicly since late 2014 and each of the members has undertaken a solo career.

== History ==
=== Background ===
Evermore were formed in Feilding, Manawatu, New Zealand in 1999 as Electro by three brothers Jon Cobbe Hume (born Jonathan Daniel Cobbe, 1983 or 1984 Lismore, Australia) on guitar and vocals, Peter Elisha Hume (born Peter Elisha Cobbe, 1985, Whangaparāoa) on keyboards and bass guitar, and Dann Hume (born Daniel Benjamin Cobbe, 1987, Feilding) on drums, guitar and vocals. One of their ancestors John Cobbe (1859–1944) owned a general store in Feilding, became a New Zealand Member of Parliament for Oroua and later a sheep farmer. The brothers were introduced to music at a young age by their parents' record collection.

From 1994 all three brothers were partly home schooled in Feilding by their mother and were given piano lessons but taught themselves to play their other instruments. They were inspired by the Who, Led Zeppelin and Crowded House to pursue a music career. Electro entered the Rockquest competition for school groups in 1999. They changed their name to "Evermore", which references Led Zeppelin's song "The Battle of Evermore" (1971). Jon has said the trio's parents were supportive: "they always wanted us to do something creative... Nothing was too risky."

=== Rise to fame (2000–2003) ===
In 2000 as Evermore with Richard Higham on bass guitar, the four-piece group won Rockquest. They used the prize money to help fund their home studio, Red Sky Studio. Dann observed, "It started as a little room and then we needed to fit the drum kit in so we had to bust down another wall... Our parents put up with a lot but they're very tolerant." This line-up issued an independent four-track extended play, On the Way in 2000. The title track and "Into the Ocean" were co-written by Jon with Martyn Hume Cobbe. After a year Higham left the band to become a farmer. Evermore had other short-term members during their early years.

At the 2002 NZ Music Awards (later known as the Aotearoa Music Awards), Evermore members met talent manager New Zealand-born Australian-based Rebekah Campbell, who then travelled to Feilding to hear their demos. Campbell, as their manager, conferred with her mentor John Woodruff who signed the group to his publishing company, Rough Cut. Woodruff travelled to Auckland to promote Evermore at the launch of the 2003 Louis Vuitton Cup in October 2002, fellow attendees included Woodruff's Canadian business partner Donald K. Tarlton. Evermore signed with Tarlton's record label, Aquarius Records, for Canadian releases. The group's first single, "Slipping Away", was released independently on 1 December 2002, with only 300 copies pressed. However, it received regular airplay on Australian national youth radio Triple J.

Evermore toured supporting American band Brad in early January 2003. While on that tour they met Barrett Jones (of Visqueen), who offered to produce their material. The New Zealand trio's five-track EP, Oil & Water, independently released on 13 January 2003, resulted in the band's first Australian concert tour – funded by Triple J. The EP reached No. 15 on the ARIA Heavy Rock & Metal singles chart and sold in excess of 5000 copies in Australia. Dann reflected, "[that's] the size of Feilding". Later in January 2003 they performed at the Big Day Out in Auckland. In the following month the Hume brothers established Fuze Music Limited with Martyn Cobbe.

The group performed at SXSW in March 2003, Rodel Delfin of Hits Daily Double, listed them as one of 50 acts to see. Then they travelled to Toronto to play four shows. In August of that year the trio appeared on the cover of New Zealand Musician, following success in "Project NZM" – a promotion by radio station ZM to gain awareness for up-and-coming bands. My Own Way EP, the band's five-track next EP, was released on 15 September 2003 via East West and Warner, which reached No. 11 on the ARIA Hitseekers Singles chart.

=== Dreams (2004–2006) ===
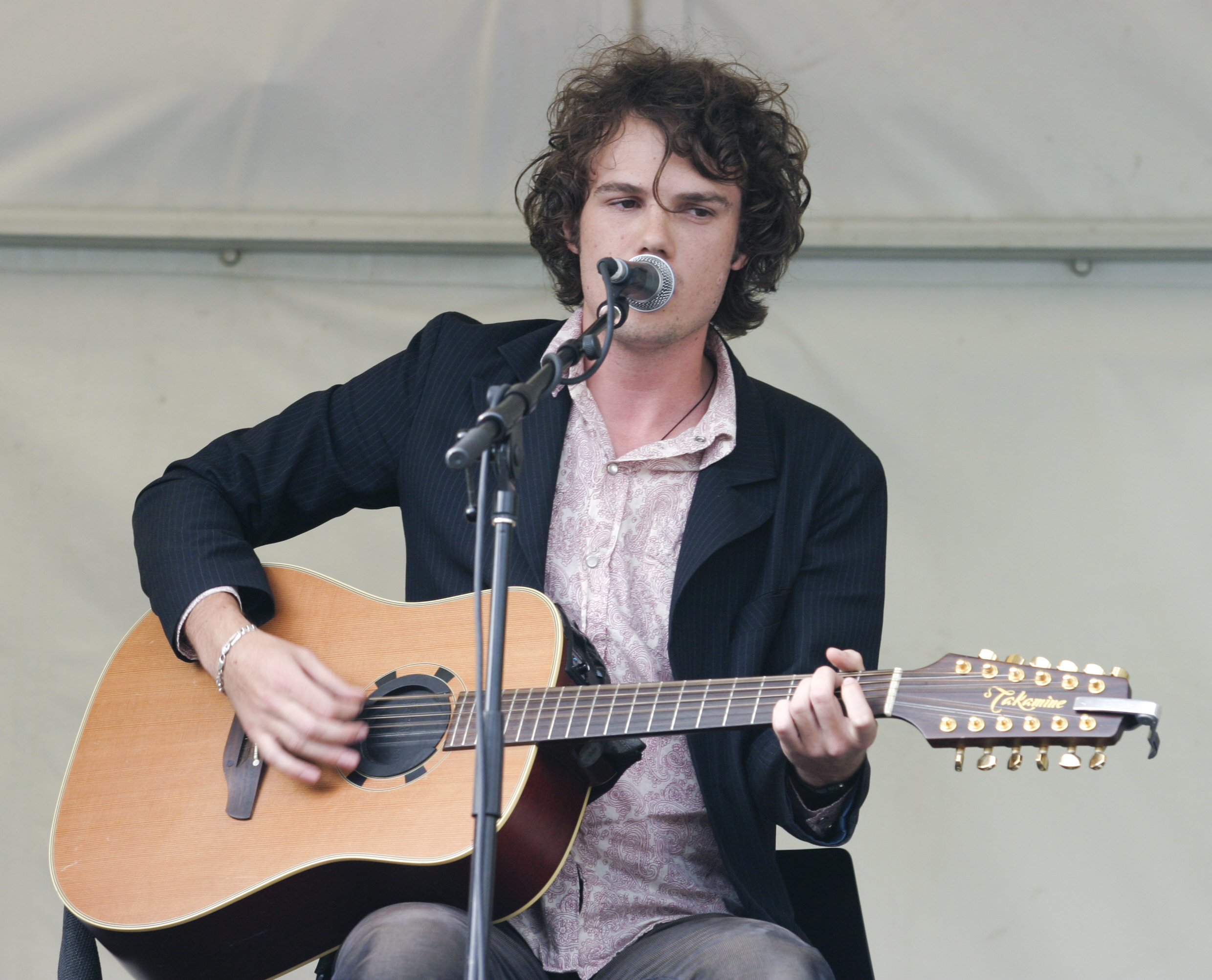
Jon Hume playing at the Australian Open in 2005

Dreams, Evermore's debut studio album, was released on 27 September 2004 in Australia via East West and Warner. It peaked at No. 15 on the ARIA albums chart and No. 30 on the RIANZ albums chart. Three singles were issued from the album; "It's Too Late" (August), "For One Day" (February 2005), and "Come to Nothing" (May); with "It's Too Late" reaching the top 20 in Australia. It included a re-recorded version of "Into the Ocean". For the album the trio worked with Jones (Nirvana, Foo Fighters, Whiskeytown) and John Alagía co-producing with Jon. Initially they wanted to use their home studio, however Red Sky Studio and parts of Feilding were flooded in February 2004, so they travelled to Jones' Seattle-based studio.

After recording Dream the trio relocated to Sydney in mid-2004. All three singles were used in New Zealand and Australian promotion of American TV show The O.C., with "It's Too Late" ultimately appearing on the show. A remixed version of "It's Too Late" with Dirty South, titled "It's Too Late (Ride on)", was also released, and was used on various artists' compilation albums. Dreams differed from Evermore's earlier "retro-sounding, riff-based pop-rock" works, and instead contained a more "spacious" sound according to Jon. He said he drew inspiration and was influenced by Silverchair and Muse, as well as Pink Floyd. Jon also noted that the band initially wanted to create a concept album, but stated that "we sort of had to tone it back a bit, because we wanted to make a double album".

Soundgenerator.com's reviewer Eleanor Goodman described Dreams as "clear rather than grungy, soulful rather than angsty". Greg Prato of AllMusic rated it at two-and-a-half out-of-five stars, felt it was too derivative and explained, "[the trio are] yet to find their own sound and approach, as evidenced by many tracks that sound like" Muse's Absolution (September 2003) or Radiohead's The Bends (March 1995).

At the ARIA Music Awards of 2005, held in October, Evermore received five nominations and performed at the ceremony. Into the Ocean (The Story So Far 1997–2005) was the trio's video album, which was issued on DVD in the following month. The title track is a 45-minute documentary on the history of the group, followed by a 70-minute live performance recorded at The Metro Theatre, Sydney and a selection of their music videos. The band released The Lakeside Sessions Vol. 1, an iTunes-exclusive live acoustic EP on 20 December 2005.

=== Real Life (2006–2008) ===
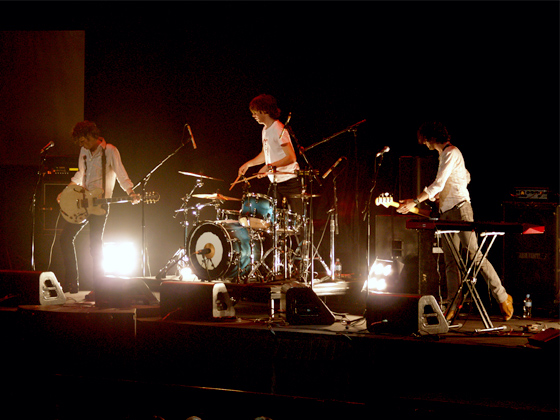
Evermore supporting Split Enz, Melbourne, June 2006

Evermore's second album, Real Life, was released on 8 July 2006 by Warner. It peaked at No. 5 on the ARIA albums chart and No. 2 on the RIANZ albums chart, spending over half a year in both. It was certified 2× platinum for shipment of 140,000 copies in Australia in July 2007. Four singles were issued from the album; "Running" (June 2006), "Light Surrounding You" (October), "Unbreakable" (March 2007), and "Never Let You Go" . Of these, "Light Surrounding You" charted highest and is Evermore's only number-one single.

Real Life was initially recorded on the Central Coast, New South Wales, where the band spent three months. Production moved to Easton, Maryland for an additional three months, and continued recording with producer Alagía. Following recording and production, it was mixed by Tom Lord-Alge (blink-182).

Despite its favourable charting the album was negatively received by music critics. Michael Dwyer of The Age was unimpressed with Real Life, "a roller-coaster of intense gestures and hollow sentiments spiralling on an updraft of crashing cymbals and synthetic harmonies" which provides "sheer, overwrought drama... [that] aims for U2 but ends up Big Country." Sputnikmusic's DaveyBoy rated it at 2.0 and declared, "Three hit singles and pretty much nothing else on this lazy, uninspired & disappointing follow-up." Bernard Zuel of The Sydney Morning Herald found it lacked ambition and "you suspect this is exactly what it was meant to sound like". He complained about its lack of excitement compared with Dreams, by displaying "a palpable contrivance that instead of bringing craft to their undoubted talent brings a stifling limitation." The album's release was followed by a tour of New Zealand and Australia in September and October 2005 with support acts Bob Evans and the Vagrant City Scandal.

The trio opened for a reformed Split Enz on their tour of Australian state capitals in June 2006 starting at Brisbane Entertainment Centre (BEC) and included Rod Laver Arena, Melbourne and ended at Burswood Dome, Perth. Jack Langridge and Brett Collingwood of Rave Magazine caught their performance at BEC, "[their] affinity with Coldplay's stadium-friendly, atmospheric rock is instantly recognisable in this cavernous setting..." and found Dann's drumming to be a "major highlight". On 17 November 2006 Evermore performed at a charity concert: the Make Poverty History Concert, in Melbourne, covering Ben E. King's "Stand by Me". Early in 2007, the band played at the Big Day Out, as well as at the 21st Australian Scout Jamboree and on 29 April they appeared at the 2007 MTV Australia Video Music Awards to perform "Light Surrounding You". In mid-2007 the group relocated from Sydney to Melbourne.

=== Truth of the World: Welcome to the Show (2008–2009) ===
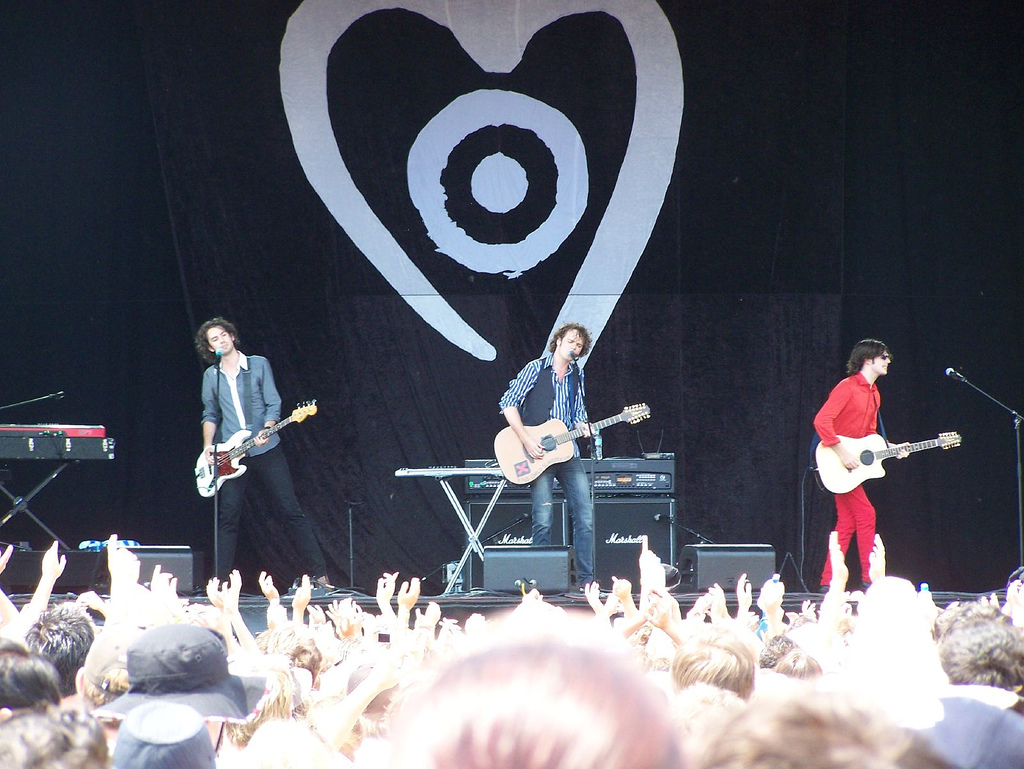
Evermore performing at the Big Day Out, Perth, 2007

The band's third studio album, Truth of the World: Welcome to the Show, was released on 20 March 2009, and debuted at No. 14 in Australia and No. 5 in New Zealand. Its lead single, "Between the Lines", was issued as a free download from the band's website on 10 November 2008. The second single, "Hey Boys and Girls (Truth of the World pt.2)", appeared on 3 February 2009, which peaked at No. 5 on the New Zealand charts and No. 4 on the Australian charts. Their single "Can You Hear Me?" was released to radio on 11 May, but did not reach the top 100 in New Zealand or Australia.

Truth of the World is a concept album about trash media, political propaganda, advertising and infotainment. It was recorded at the band's own Dragonfly Studio, Melbourne over a period of 18 months from July 2007 to January 2009. The studio had been built via the proceeds of their previous work. Otago Daily Times' Shane Gilchrist observed, they "mixed classic rock histrionics (perhaps minus the guitar solos) with the pulsating textures of modern electronica." Matt Gallant of theDwarf.com.au was unimpressed with the work, "[it] attempts to tell a dark and sinister story, rather than deliver a collection of engaging tracks... [they] attempt more than they can achieve".

In July and August 2009 Evermore supported Pink during the Funhouse Tour on the second half of the Australian leg. After the group's Australian tours in support of Truth of the World: Welcome to the Show and supporting Pink, the singer invited them as main support act for her subsequent European tour, from October to December. The band released their self-titled compilation album in October 2009 in Australia and New Zealand, which provided the single "Underground" (October).

=== Follow the Sun (2010–2014) ===
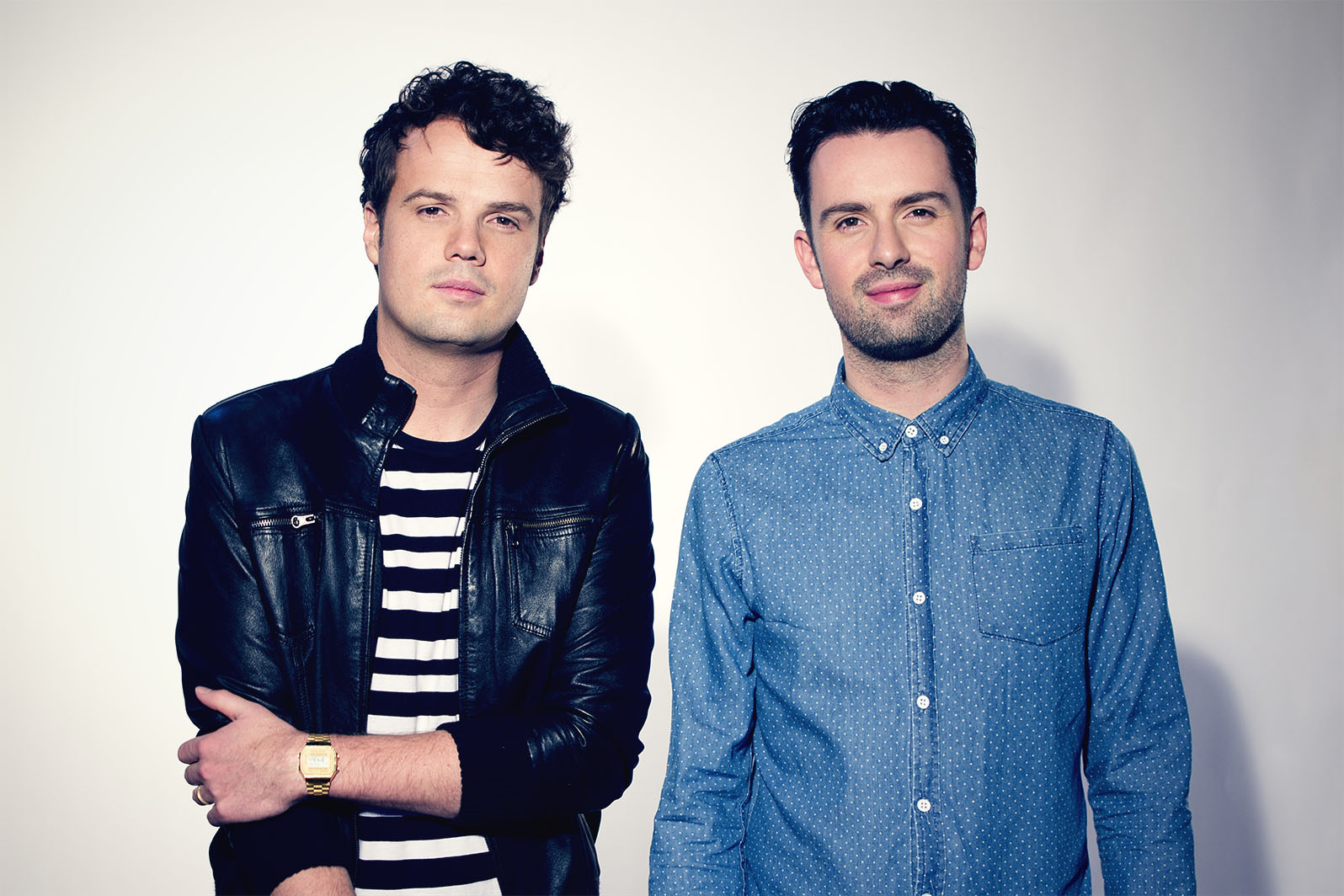
Jon and Peter Hume, July 2013

Upon return to Australia in early 2010, Evermore took time off from touring, to start writing and recording their next studio album. Jon Hume built a new recording studio, The Stables Recording Studio, in 2011 in Macedon Ranges, Victoria. Early that year they took a portable recording studio on a round-the-world song writing trip.

On 12 October 2012 they issued their fourth studio album Follow the Sun, which reached No. 22 in New Zealand and No. 40 in Australia. Its lead single and title track "Follow the Sun", was used by HBO United States in promotion for the station's 2013 season and also appeared in the worldwide trailer for DreamWorks Animation's The Croods. Two Australia headline tours followed in 2012 and 2013, as well as support for Maroon 5's Australian leg of their worldwide Overexposed Tour and Matchbox Twenty's Australian North Tour with INXS.

In 2012 Dann stopped touring with Evermore to pursue his own singing and production career. He supported the Lisa Mitchell tour in 2012 as Danco. Meanwhile Evermore, without Dann, toured Australia from April to June 2013 to promote the album and its second single, "Hero" (January 2013). The group's last single, "One Love", appeared in August 2013 as a charity single supporting that year's Global Citizen Festival. In October 2014 Evermore performed as a duo of Jon and Peter Hume at the Precinct Hotel, Melbourne.

== Afterwards ==
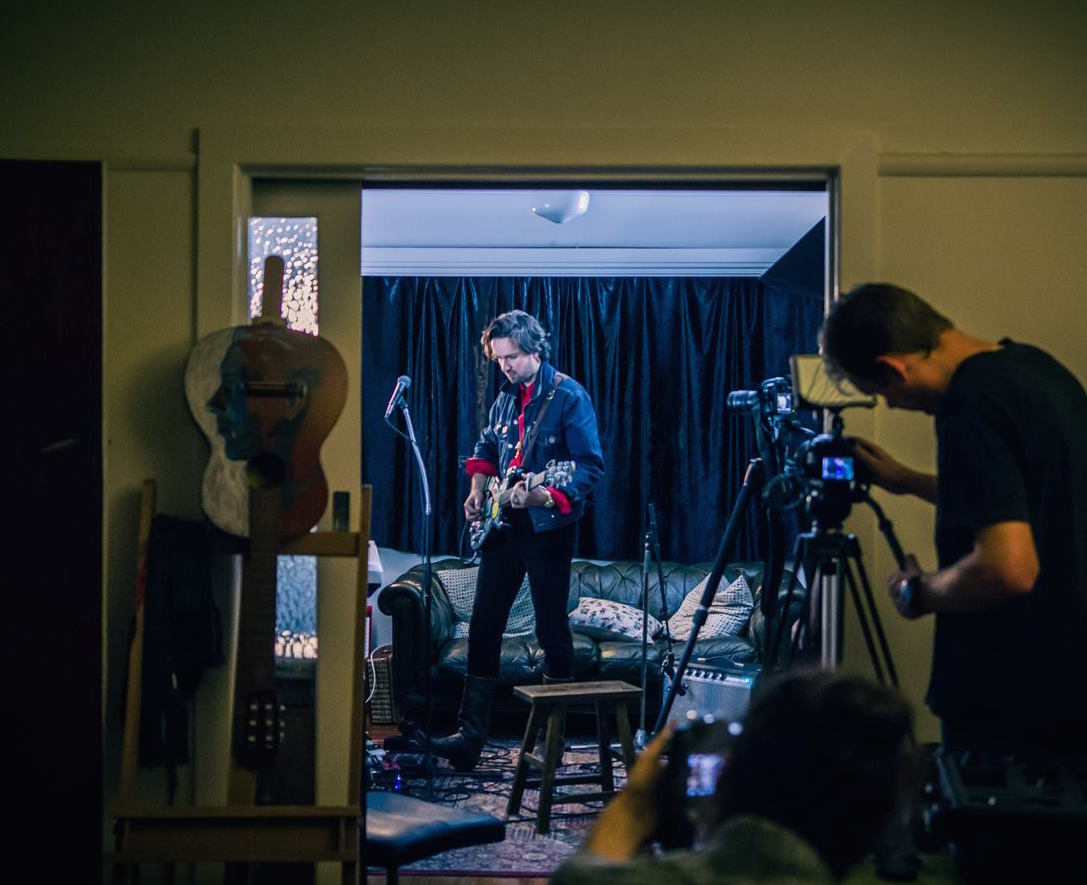
Peter Hume (centre), 2015

Outside of their Evermore work each of the Hume brothers has pursued their own careers. While still a member of Evermore, Dann started working as a producer on Lisa Mitchell's first two EPs Said One to the Other (August 2007) and Welcome to the Afternoon (May 2008); he then re-recorded material for her debut studio album, Wonder (July 2009). Mitchell declared that working with Dann provided "versions [that] had more energy and were a lot lighter – they were positive and uplifting". He also produced her second album, Bless This Mess (October 2012), working at The Stables Recording Studio instead of touring with Evermore.

Dann is also credited on Matt Corby's debut album, Telluric (producer, engineer, co-writer, March 2016), Troye Sivan's debut album, Blue Neighbourhood (December 2015) and Kita Alexander's single "Hotel" (September 2017). He co-produced and co-engineered (with M-Phazes) the lead single, "I Said Hi" (April 2018) from Amy Shark's debut album, Love Monster (July). At that year's ARIA Awards they were both nominated for Producer of the Year (which they won) and Engineer of the Year. In the following year he won Producer of the Year again for his work on Corby's second studio album, Rainbow Valley (November 2018).

Jon worked on E^ST's third EP, Get Money! (July 2016) as producer, mixer and composer. He followed with Bliss n Eso's sixth studio album, Off the Grid (producer, April 2017), Starley's single "Arms Around Me" (producer, recording engineer, 2020) and Sheppard's EP Highest of Highs (engineer, mixer, producer, 2021). In 2017 he sold The Stables Recording Studio to Jan Skubiszewski and Ilaria Walker, who renamed it Red Moon Studios. Jon co-wrote "Be Alright" (June 2018) with the singer Dean Lewis, which appeared on APRA billion streams list in 2019.

Besides being a mult-instrumentalist and singer Peter provides artwork, photography, graphic design, music video direction, cinematography and other promotional material. At the 2022 ARIA Music Awards Peter was nominated for Best Video as director for Luude's cover version of "Down Under" featuring original singer Colin Hay.

== Members ==
- Jon Hume – vocals, guitars, percussion, piano, ukulele, drums (1999–2014)
- Peter Hume – bass guitar, keyboards, piano, vocals, mandolin, ukulele, guitar (1999–2014)
- Dann Hume – drums, percussion, vocals, guitars, piano (1999–2012)
- Richard Higham – bass guitar (2000–2001)

== Discography ==
- 2004: Dreams
- 2006: Real Life
- 2009: Truth of the World: Welcome to the Show
- 2012: Follow the Sun

== Awards and nominations ==
=== ARIA Music Awards ===
The ARIA Music Awards are a set of annual ceremonies presented by Australian Recording Industry Association (ARIA), which recognise excellence, innovation, and achievement across all genres of the music of Australia. They commenced in 1987.

Year	Nominated work	Category	Result	Ref.
2005	Dreams	Album of the Year	Nominated	
2005	Dreams	Breakthrough Artist – Album	Nominated	
2005	Evermore	Best Group	Nominated	
2005	Dreams	Best Rock Album	Nominated	
2005	"For One Day"	Single of the Year	Nominated	
2007	"Light Surrounding You"	Best Pop Release	Nominated	
2009	"Hey Boys and Girls"	Highest Selling Single	Nominated	

=== New Zealand Music Awards ===
The Aotearoa Music Awards have been presented since 1965 under various names including New Zealand Music Awards.

Year	Nominated work	Category	Result	Ref.
2007	Real Life	Album of the Year	Nominated	
2007	"Light Surrounding You"	Single of the Year	Won	
2007	Evermore	People's Choice Award	Nominated	
2007	Real Life	Best Group	Nominated	
2007	Real Life	Best Rock Album	Nominated	
2007	Evermore	International Achievement	awardee	

=== Other awards ===
==== Won ====
- 2005 MTV Australia Awards, Supernova Breakthrough Act for Dreams
- 2005 APRA Silver Scroll Award for "It's Too Late"
- 2007 Channel V Oz Artist of the Year

==== Nominated ====
- 2005 Jack Awards, Best Live Newcomer
- 2006 APRA Silver Scroll Award for "Running"
- 2010 APRA Awards, Most Played Australian Work and Rock Work of the Year for "Hey Boys and Girls (Truth of the World pt.2)"
- 2013 APRA Rock Work of the Year for "Follow the Sun" by Dann, Peter and Jon Hume.
