= Dirty South (musician) =

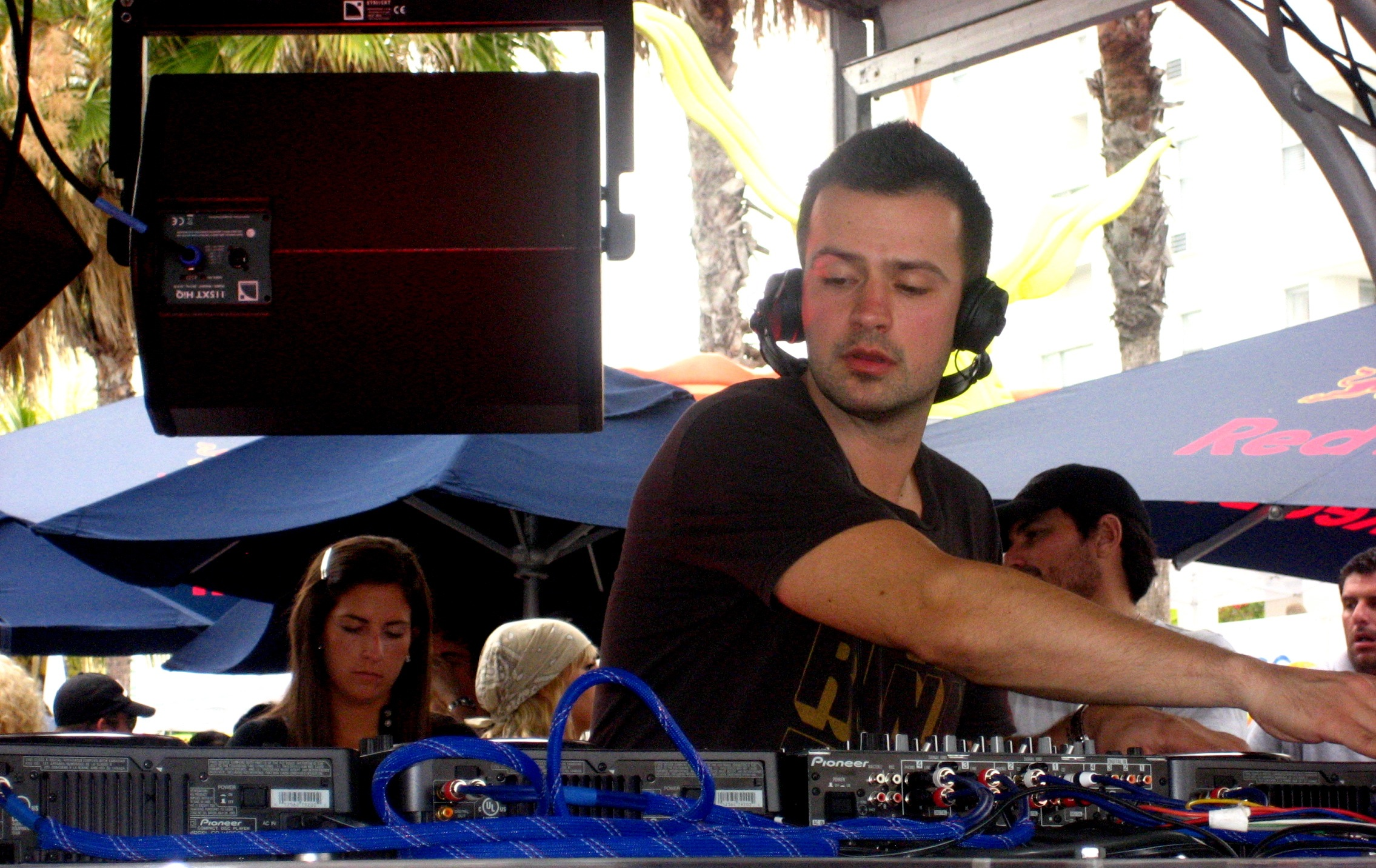
- Dirty South at the Winter Music Conference 2009

Background information
- Also known as: Dirty South
- Born: Dragan Roganović; 15 November 1978 (age 47); Belgrade, SR Serbia, SFR Yugoslavia
- Origin: Melbourne, Victoria, Australia
- Genres: House; progressive house; electro house
- Occupations: DJ; record producer; remixer
- Instrument: Logic Pro
- Years active: 2004–present
- Labels: Anjunabeats, Phazing, Axtone, Vicious Vinyl
- Website: www.dirtysouth.com

Dragan Roganović (Serbian Cyrillic: Драган Рогановић, pronounced [drǎgan rogǎːnoʋit͡ɕ]; born 15 November 1978), better known by his stage name Dirty South is a Serbian-Australian DJ, record producer and remixer based in Melbourne.

== Biography ==
Born in Belgrade, SFR Yugoslavia, now Serbia, Dirty South's producing career developed in tandem with his DJing career. He got his start at the age of 13 after he relocated to Melbourne, Australia, where he currently resides. Influenced by everything around him, the artist started improvising with his old NEC Hi-Fi and mixing with the tape decks, and then started making bootlegs and mashups, which eventually led to getting a computer, software, and keyboard that resulted in his first official production in 2004 as Dirty South. He used his family computer to create remixes and mashups of other artists' tracks and distributed them worldwide, which caught the attention of Australian Vicious Vinyl records, who signed him in 2005.

Since then, the Australian-based DJ has received numerous honours for his work, including: two ARIA nominations (Australian Music Industry's top accolade) for "Best Dance Release" in 2005 and 2006, he was voted "Most Popular Producer Nationally" in the 2007 InTheMix 50 DJ Poll, he achieved the number one position in the Australian Club Charts with his remix of "It's Too Late" by Evermore in late 2006, and he was the first Australian artist since 1999 to win one of Pete Tong's Essential New Tune awards. He also ranked second in the annual InTheMix 50 DJ Poll in 2007 and he has been ranked in the DJ Mag Top 100 DJ poll every year since 2007.

Dirty South teamed up with British DJ Paul Harris in 2007 and produced "Better Day," which earned Dirty South another essential radio play by Pete Tong. He also remixed a number of songs, including "Reach For Me", "Feels Like Home", and "Higher State of Consciousness" with fellow Melburnians TV Rock. In late July 2007, he joined with MYNC Project to release "Everybody Freakin". Another one of his honours came when his single, "Let It Go", was released on Axwell's record label Axtone in 2007.

Additionally, he has also been nominated for two Grammy Awards – he provided a remix for Kaskade's song "Sorry", which was nominated for a 2008 Grammy Award for Best Remixed Recording, and he was then nominated in 2011 in the same category for a remix he and Axwell did for The Temper Trap's "Sweet Disposition".

Dirty South's track "Phazing", which featured vocals by Rudy, was one of the top sellers on Beatport when it was released in 2010. In 2011, he produced the track "Anything" for UK singer/rapper Example's No. 1 album Playing in the Shadows and in 2012, he produced the song "Say Nothing", the lead single from Example's fourth studio album, The Evolution of Man. Dirty South has produced, collaborated, or remixed for artists such as Snoop Dogg, The Pussycat Dolls, Kaskade, U2, Diddy – Dirty Money, The Temper Trap, David Guetta, Sebastian Ingrosso and more than 50 artists in total.

In August 2012, Dirty South released the single "City of Dreams" with Alesso featuring vocals from Ruben Haze. It was initially released exclusively on Beatport and it reached the No. 1 position on the Beatport Top 100 its first week of release. In support of "City of Dreams", Dirty South announced his largest North American tour to date, the City of Dreams Tour. The 30+ stop tour took him across North America from September through to December 2012 and included stops at venues such as New York City's Roseland Ballroom and Los Angeles' Palladium.

He is the older brother of professional footballer and former Melbourne Heart goalkeeper Nikola Roganovic. From January 2015 to December 2017, Nikola played in the National Premier League for South Melbourne.

== Discography ==
=== Albums ===
List of albums, with selected details
Title	Details
Speed of Life	Released: April 2013; Format: Digital; Label: Phazing Records (PHAZD001)
With You	Released: October 2014; Format: Digital; Label: Phazing Records (PHAZD002)
XV	Released: February 2018; Format: Digital; Label: Phazing Records (PHAZD004)
Darko	Released: 2018; Format: Digital; Label:

=== Extended Plays ===
List of EP, with selected details
Title	Album details	Peak chart positions
Title	Album details	AUS
Dirty South	Released: April 2006; Format: LP, CD; Label: Vicious Grooves (VG12039CD)	43

=== Charting singles ===
Year	Title	Peak Chart Position						Album
Year	Title	AUS	BEL (VL)	SWE	NLD	FRA	ESP	Album
2005	"Sleazy"	72	–	–	–	–	–	Non-album singles
2006	"It's Too Late (Ride On)" (Dirty South vs. Evermore)	–	55	–	75	69	–	Non-album singles
2007	"Let It Go"	–	–	–	34	–	10	Non-album singles
2008	"Open Your Heart" (with Axwell and Rudy)	–	–	–	21	–	–	Non-album singles
2008	"The End"	–	–	–	83	–	–	Non-album singles
2009	"How Soon Is Now" (with David Guetta, Sebastian Ingrosso and Julie McKnight)	–	–	52	–	–	–	Non-album singles
2011	"Alive" (with Thomas Gold and Kate Elsworth)	–	64	–	–	–	–	Non-album singles
2012	"Eyes Wide Open" (with Thomas Gold and Kate Elsworth)	–	10	–	–	–	–	Non-album singles
2013	"City Of Dreams" (with Alesso and Ruben Haze)	–	36	–	–	–	–	Non-album singles
2014	"Unbreakable" (with Sam Martin)	–	101	–	–	–	–	With You
"—" denotes a recording that did not chart or was not released.

== Awards and nominations ==
=== ARIA Music Awards ===
The ARIA Music Awards is an annual awards ceremony that recognises excellence, innovation, and achievement across all genres of Australian music.

Year	Nominee / work	Award	Result
2005	"Sleazy"	Best Dance Release	Nominated
2006	Dirty South	Best Dance Release	Nominated
