= Dreams (Evermore album) =

Studio album by Evermore
- Released: 27 September 2004
- Recorded: November 2003 – May 2004 at Laundry Room Studio, Seattle
- Genre: Rock
- Length: 53:17
- Labels: East West, Warner
- Producers: Barrett Jones, John Alagía Jon Hume

Evermore chronology
My Own Way EP (2003)	Dreams (2004)	Real Life (2006)

Singles from Dreams
- 1. "It's Too Late" Released: 2 August 2004; 2. "For One Day" Released: 14 February 2005; 3. "Come to Nothing" Released: 23 May 2005

Dreams is the debut album by Evermore, released on 27 September 2004 in Australia, 8 October 2004 in New Zealand and 23 May 2006 in the US. The album peaked at No. 15 on the Australian ARIA Albums Chart, and received platinum accreditation in 2005. The album was nominated for four ARIA Music Awards in 2005. It reached No. 30 on the Official New Zealand Music Chart for albums.

The first single off the album was "It's Too Late", which was released on 2 August 2004, where it debuted at No. 38 on the ARIA Singles Chart, eventually reaching No. 15 in November 2004. The single was also the seventh-most played song in Australia in 2005. The second single "For One Day" was released on 14 February 2005, debuting on the ARIA Singles Chart at No. 20. The single was also nominated for Single of the Year at the ARIA Music Awards. A third single "Come to Nothing" was released on 23 May 2005.

In the 2004 Triple J Hottest 100, "It's Too Late" came in at No. 14 and "For One Day" at No. 57.

In 2005, "Into the Ocean (Calling You)" was adopted as the soundtrack theme for Ghost Hunt, a New Zealand paranormal television show. In 2006, a Dirty South remix of "It's Too Late" reached No. 1 on the Australian Club Charts and remained in the top 50 for 24 weeks.

== Critical reception ==
Professional ratings
Review scores
Source	Rating
Allmusic	2.5/5 stars
IGN	(7.1/10)
Pop Matters	(5/10)
Sound Generator	(6/10)
The Australian	4.5/5 stars
The Herald	4/5 stars

Dreams received generally favorable reviews from critics.

== Track listing ==
All tracks are written by Evermore, except where noted.

Dreams
No.	Title	Length
1.	"dreaming... pt. 1" (Jon Hume)	2:10
2.	"It's Too Late"	3:55
3.	"This Unavoidable Thing Between Us"	5:02
4.	"For One Day"	4:10
5.	"dreaming... pt. 2" (Peter Hume)	1:55
6.	"Are You Satisfied???"	4:19
7.	"Come to Nothing"	4:06
8.	"Dreams Call Out to Me"	4:34
9.	"Without Your Smile"	3:51
10.	"Into the Ocean (Calling You)"	5:11
11.	"Know It's True"	6:02
12.	"Sunshine"	2:39
13.	"Everyone (Moving on)"	5:23
14.	"Make It Right" (Bonus Track; Australia / US iTunes)	4:16
15.	"I Feel" (Bonus Track; Australia / US iTunes)	3:53

== Personnel ==
- Jon Hume – vocals, guitars
- Peter Hume – keyboards, piano, bass, vocals
- Dann Hume – drums, percussion, vocals

== Charts ==
=== Weekly charts ===
Chart (2004–06)	Peak position
Australian Albums (ARIA)	15
New Zealand Albums (RMNZ)	30

=== Year-end charts ===
Chart (2005)	Position
Australian (ARIA Charts)	62

== Certifications ==
Region	Certification	Certified units/sales
Australia (ARIA)	Platinum	70,000^{^}
^{^} Shipments figures based on certification alone.

== Release history ==
Region	Date	Label	Format	Catalogue
Australia	27 September 2004	East West, Warner	CD, Digital download	5046751482
New Zealand	8 October 2004	East West, Warner	CD, Digital download	
USA	23 May 2006	Zealous	CD, Digital download	
