= Speed of Life (Dirty South album) =

Studio album by Dirty South
- Released: March 5, 2013
- Length: 46:51
- Label: Phazing
- Producer: Dirty South

Dirty South chronology
Speed of Life (2013)	With You (2014)

Singles from Speed of Life
- 1. "Until The End" Released: 13 August 2013

Speed of Life is the debut studio album of Australian DJ and producer Dirty South, released on March 5, 2013 by Phazing Records. The album displays a change from Dirty South's previous big room-influenced music to a more downtempo electronica sound.

== Background ==
According to Dirty South, Speed of Life was recorded and composed on the road while he was touring in North America. During his days off in between of shows, he would travel to multiple studios located in New York, Las Vegas and Los Angeles to work on the album. Tracks would also be produced whenever Roganović [Dirty South] experienced stints of inspiration, which led him to record on his plane journeys or in his hotel rooms in which his laptop would be used. The album was finalised and mastered in his hometown, Australia. In an interview with DJ Mag, Roganović stated that many of the tracks reminded him of the cities where the songs were produced. "'Gods', 'Until The End' and 'Your Heart' remind of Los Angeles. 'Sunrise', 'Super Sounds' and "Champions' remind me of my home town Melbourne quite a bit," said Roganović.

The album reflects Dirty South's desire to put his favourite music together in one location, which would contain different sounds and influences. "I love hip-hop, rock, guitars, a lot of guitars, a lot of trance, emotional sounds. I love classical music. This is a reflection of that, and it's all mashed up into one album," stated Roganović. It was also designed to contain tracks that represent different moods and energy levels in order to balance out the album, which would otherwise cause listeners to burn out.

== Critical reception ==
Speed of Life received positive reception from critics. Michael Wakabayashi from Magnetic Magazine wrote that the album was a "collection of electronic masterpieces that are not only suited for the party environment but also for at-home listeners", with many of the tracks incorporating "gentle acoustic instruments" to create " beautiful harmonies and rich atmospheres". The critic was also impressed by the rhythm variations of the songs and the vocals of Ruben Haze whose presence in "Gods" gives the track a "deep and emotional emphasis". Dancing Astronaut's Andrew Spada describes the album as "devoid of formulaic builds and drops – the calling card of festival EDM". He continued by writing that Dirty South had "crafted an album rich in both character and charisma, utilizing intricately layered productions of finely-tuned electronica to develop a 45-minute glance into his psyche". Travis Stewart of YourEDM praised the arrangements and creativity on the instrumental tracks of the album, but dubbed a few vocalised tracks as "lacklustre", notably "Something Like You". Stewart stated that although he liked the instrumental form of the track, he commented that "Rudy’s vocals are drowned out in the mix and sound very subdued. While the filter effects are a nice touch, his voice simply does not stand out".

== Track listing ==
Credits adapted from Beatport. All tracks are produced by Dragan Roganović.

No.	Title	Length
1.	"Gods" (featuring Ruben Haze)	4:24
2.	"Super Sounds"	4:41
3.	"Until The End" (featuring Joe Gil)	4:05
4.	"Champions"	5:34
5.	"Sunrise"	3:30
6.	"Your Heart" (featuring Joe Gil)	4:09
7.	"Reset"	4:44
8.	"Something Like You" (featuring Rudy)	4:43
9.	"Sunset"	3:57
10.	"Speed of Life"	7:04
Total length:		46:51

== Charts ==
Chart (2013)	Peak position
US Top Heatseekers (Billboard)	8

== Release history ==
Region	Date	Format	Label	Ref
Worldwide	March 5, 2013	Digital download	Phazing Records	
