= It's Too Late (Evermore song) =

2004 single by Evermore

Single by Evermore

from the album Dreams
- B-side: "Flow"; "It's Only Love"; "Down in Splendour"
- Released: 2 August 2004
- Studio: The Laundry Room (Seattle, Washington); RedSky (New Zealand); Craptrap (Easton, Maryland)
- Genre: Rock
- Length: 3:55
- Label: EastWest
- Songwriter: Evermore
- Producer: John Alagía

Evermore singles chronology
"It's Too Late" (2004)	"For One Day" (2005)

"It's Too Late" is the lead single by rock band Evermore, taken from their debut album, Dreams (2004). The track was written by the group's three New Zealand-raised brothers: Dann (backing vocals, drums), Jon (lead vocals, lead guitar), and Peter Hume (backing vocals, piano, keyboards, bass guitar). It was produced by John Alagía and released on 2 August 2004, reaching No. 16 on the ARIA Singles Chart in their adopted country of Australia. In Australia, the song was ranked at No. 14 on Triple J's Hottest 100 of 2004.

An alternate version, the Dirty South Remix, "It's Too Late (Ride On)", was issued as a single on 7 August 2006. It reached the top 100 in Belgium, France, and the Netherlands.

== Background ==
"It's Too Late" is the lead single from Evermore's debut album, Dreams (September 2004), which peaked at No. 16 on the ARIA Singles Chart. The group consists of three New Zealand-raised brothers, Jon (lead vocals, lead guitar), Peter (backing vocals, piano, keyboards, bass guitar), and Dann Hume (backing vocals, drums) – they co-wrote "It's Too Late". Evermore worked with producers Barrett Jones (Nirvana, Foo Fighters, Whiskeytown) and (Dave Matthews Band, John Mayer).

Two more singles were released from the album: "For One Day" (February 2005), and "Come to Nothing" (May) – which charted in the top 100. All three singles were featured on the New Zealand and Australian promos for the United States TV program, The O.C., with "It's Too Late" ultimately appearing on the show.

== Track listing ==
All tracks are written by Evermore, except "Down in Splendour" written by Straitjacket Fits.

CD single / iTunes EP
No.	Title	Length
1.	"It's Too Late"	3:58
2.	"Flow"	5:21
3.	"It's Only Love"	4:00
4.	"Down in Splendour"	3:28

== Charts ==
=== Weekly charts ===
Chart (2004)	Peak position
Australia (ARIA)	16

=== Year-end charts ===
Chart (2004)	Position
Australia (ARIA)	96

== Release history ==
Region	Date	Label	Format	Catalogue	Ref.
Australia	2 August 2004	EastWest	CD	5046743322	

== "It's Too Late (Ride On)" ==
"It's Too Late (Ride On)"

Single by Dirty South vs. Evermore
- Released: 4 August 2006
- Genre: Electro house; rock
- Length: 3:05
- Label: Warner; Ultra
- Songwriter: Evermore
- Producers: John Alagia; Dragan Roganović

Dirty South singles chronology
"Sleazy" (2005)	"It's Too Late (Ride On)" (2006)	"Let It Go" (2007)

Evermore singles chronology
"Running" (2006)	"It's Too Late (Ride On)" (2006)	"Light Surrounding You" (2006)

On 7 August 2006, a remixed version of "It's Too Late" by Dirty South (aka Dragan Roganović), titled "It's Too Late (Ride on)", was released. The remixed single reached the top 100 in Belgium, France and the Netherlands.

=== Track listing ===
All tracks are written by Evermore, except "Down in Splendour" written by Straitjacket Fits.

CD single / iTunes single
No.	Title	Length
1.	"It's Too Late (Ride On)" (Radio Edit)	3:04
2.	"It's Too Late (Ride On)" (Dirty South Remix)	6:32
3.	"It's Only Love"	4:00
4.	"Down in Splendour"	3:28
