= Running (Evermore song) =

2006 single by Evermore

Single by Evermore

from the album Real Life
- B-side: "Broken Glass"; "Not Who You Think You are"; "Dry"
- Released: 5 June 2006
- Length: 4:36
- Label: Warner Music
- Songwriter: Dann Hume
- Producers: Jon Hume; John Alagía

Evermore singles chronology
"Dreams Call Out to Me" (2005)	"Running" (2006)	"It's Too Late (Ride On)" (2006)

"Running" is the lead single from New Zealand alternative rock band Evermore's second studio album, Real Life (2006). The song was written by drummer Dann Hume and co-produced by lead vocalist Jon Hume with John Alagía. "Running" was issued on 5 June 2006, a month ahead of the album. The track subsequently peaked at No. 4 on New Zealand's RIANZ Singles Chart and No. 5 on Australia's ARIA Singles Chart.

== Background ==
"Running" was released on 5 June 2006 ahead of Evermore's second album, Real Life, which appeared on 8 July by Warner. The single peaked at No. 4 on the RIANZ Singles Chart in New Zealand. The group consists of three New Zealand raised brothers, Jon (lead vocals, lead guitar), Peter (backing vocals, piano, keyboards, bass guitar), and Dann Hume (backing vocals, drums, rhythm guitar). It also reached No. 5 on the ARIA Singles Chart in their adopted country of Australia.

== Music video ==
The video contains the band exploring different locations around the world, including Hong Kong, Sydney, London and Egypt. It has shots of the band walking on a beach in New Zealand, and Rangitoto Island can be seen in the background. The scarf that lead singer Jon Hume is wearing throughout the video is meant to be the same, as if he is "running" from one country to another. The New Zealand Herald's Rebecca Barry Hill interviewed the group, they described making the video "'We were completely self-sufficient making the video, as well', says Peter, who does the artwork. Dann: 'It's just us walking around the world. There's no smoke and mirrors making us look better-looking than we are. I think we're like that, just slightly raw'".

== Track listing ==
CD single and iTunes EP
No.	Title	Writer(s)	Length
1.	"Running"	Dann Hume	4:24
2.	"Broken Glass"	Peter Hume	3:26
3.	"Not Who You Think You are"	D Hume, Jon Hume	3:50
4.	"Dry"	D Hume	3:18

== Personnel ==
- Jon Hume – lead vocals, lead guitar
- Peter Hume – keyboards, bass guitar, artwork
- Dann Hume – drums, rhythm guitar, backing vocals

== Charts ==
=== Weekly charts ===
Chart (2006)	Peak position
Australia (ARIA)	5
New Zealand (Recorded Music NZ)	4

=== Year-end charts ===
Chart (2006)	Position
Australia (ARIA)	44

== Certifications ==
Region	Certification	Certified units/sales
New Zealand (RMNZ)	Platinum	30,000^{‡}
^{‡} Sales+streaming figures based on certification alone.

== Release history ==
Region	Date	Format(s)	Label	Catalogue	Ref.
Australia	5 June 2006	CD; digital download	Warner Music Australasia	5101142132	
