= For One Day =

2005 single by Evermore

Single by Evermore

from the album Dreams
- B-side: "At the Source"; "Hard to Believe"; "Say Goodbye"
- Released: 14 February 2005
- Studio: Laundry Room (Seattle)
- Length: 4:20
- Label: EastWest
- Songwriters: James He; Simon Holmes
- Producers: Barrett Jones; John Alagía

Evermore singles chronology
"It's Too Late" (2004)	"For One Day" (2005)	"Come to Nothing" (2005)

"For One Day" is a song by New Zealand band Evermore, released as the second single from their debut album, Dreams (2004). In Australia, the song reached number 25 on the ARIA Singles Chart was ranked number 57 on Triple J's Hottest 100 of 2004.

== Track listing ==
All tracks are written by Dann Hume, except "For One Day" by James He and Simon Holmes.

Australian CD single
No.	Title	Length
1.	"For One Day" (radio edit)	3:48
2.	"At the Source"	3:40
3.	"Hard to Believe"	3:28
4.	"Say Goodbye"	3:54

== Charts ==
Chart (2005)	Peak position
Australia (ARIA)	25

== Release history ==
Region	Date	Format	Label	Catalogue	Ref.
Australia	14 February 2005	CD	EastWest	5046765802	
