= Peter Hume (musician) =

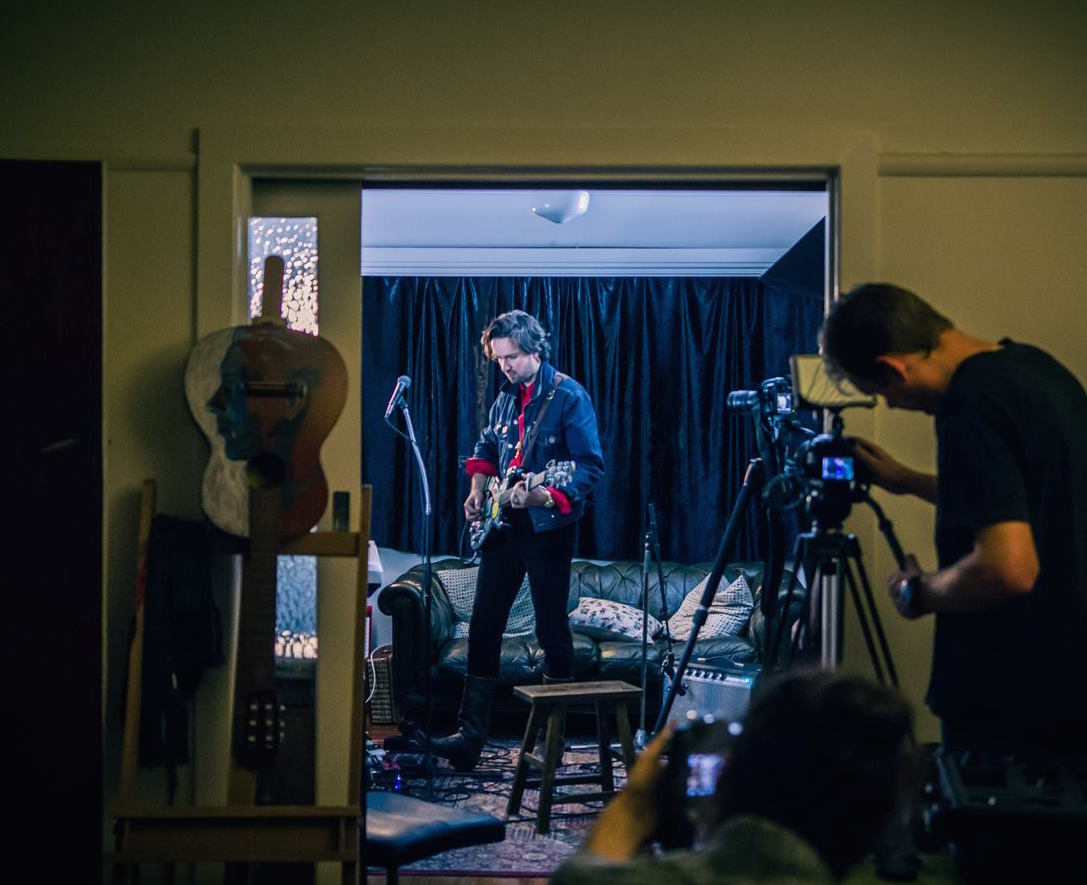
- Peter Hume, 2015

Background information
- Born: Peter Elisha Cobbe; 4 September 1985 (age 40); Whangaparāoa, New Zealand
- Genres: Alternative rock; pop; electronic
- Occupations: Songwriter, musician, filmmaker, art director
- Instruments: Bass guitar; piano; keyboards; vocals; guitar; mandolin; accordion
- Years active: 1999–present
- Labels: Warner Music; Universal
- Website: www.facebook.com/evermore

Peter Elisha Hume (born Peter Elisha Cobbe, 4 September 1985) is a New Zealand singer-songwriter, multi-instrumentalist and art director; originally from Whangaparāoa. Hume is the middle of three brothers (with Jon and Dann) who formed the band Evermore. Hume has contributed to songs for Evermore and also sung lead vocals on some of the band's album tracks. In 2008, Hume was shortlisted for the Cleo Bachelor of the Year award.

== Early life ==
Born Peter Elisha Cobbe, as the middle son of the Hume family. Alongside brothers Jon and Dann they formed Evermore in Feilding in 1999. Hume attended Red Beach Primary School until the age of 9, after which, he and his brothers became home schooled by their mother.

Peter played inter-club tennis and had a great passion for colouring-in competitions along with his younger brother Dann Hume. Unfortunately his career as a colouring-in champion was cut short due to a scandal of adults believing the artwork was created by someone much older.

As teenagers, the Hume brothers moved to Australia to pursue music professionally. Their mother is from Australia and father is from New Zealand.

== Evermore (1999–present) ==
Hume has contributed to Evermore songs such as 'Hero', 'Come to Nothing', 'For One Day', 'Between the Lines', 'Follow The Sun' and 'It's Too Late' and also sung on Evermore album tracks including 'Morning Star', 'That's The Way', 'Dreaming... Pt.2', 'Broken Glass', 'Inside Of Me', 'Haunted', and 'It's Only Love'.

As part of Evermore, Hume plays bass guitar, keyboards, piano, ukulele, mandolin, guitar and vocals.

He also contributes artwork, photography, graphic design and cinematography to the band's albums, music videos and other promotional material.

== Awards and nominations ==
=== ARIA Music Awards ===
The ARIA Music Awards is an annual awards ceremony that recognises excellence, innovation, and achievement across all genres of the music of Australia. Fanning has won five awards.

Year	Nominee / work	Award	Result	Ref.
2022	"Down Under" (Luude featuring Colin Hay) (dir. Peter Hume)	Best Video	Nominated	
