= Dann Hume =

- Born: Daniel Benjamin Cobbe; 1 September 1987 (age 39); Feilding, New Zealand
- Occupations: Songwriter, producer, mix engineer
- Instruments: Vocals, guitar, drums, piano, keyboards, bass, harmonica, accordion
- Years active: 1999–present

Dann Hume (born Daniel Benjamin Cobbe, 1 September 1987) is a New Zealand musician, music producer, mix engineer and songwriter. Hume began his career with his two brothers (with Jon Hume and Peter Hume) who formed the alternative rock band Evermore in 1999. Hume co-wrote songs for Evermore, including "Running", "Light Surrounding You" and "It's Too Late".

== Life and career ==
Dann Hume was born Daniel Benjamin Cobbe, and is the youngest son of the Hume family. In 1999, with his two brothers, he formed Evermore in Feilding. He has co-written songs for Evermore such as "Running", "Light Surrounding You" as well as the first single from Dreams, "It's Too Late". Soon after the release of Evermore's fourth studio album Follow the Sun in late 2012, Hume stepped away from touring with the band to focus on music production.

As a producer, he has worked with a host of Australian artists including Lisa Mitchell, Matt Corby, Amy Shark, Alpine, Troye Sivan, Client Liaison, Snakadaktal, Sticky Fingers, Courtney Barnett, Hopium and Kita Alexander.

Lisa Mitchell's Wonder achieved ARIA platinum status, and albums reaching ARIA gold status include Matt Corby's debut Telluric, and Sticky Fingers' Caress Your Soul. Kita Alexander's Hotel and Amy Shark's Weekends achieved ARIA platinum and gold status, respectively. At the ARIA Music Awards of 2019, Hume won Producer of the Year for his work on Corby's album, Rainbow Valley.

== Songwriting and production credits ==
| Title | Year | Artist(s) | Album | Credits | Written with | Produced with |
|---|---|---|---|---|---|---|
| "Coin Laundry" | 2009 | Lisa Mitchell | Wonder | Producer | - | - |
| "Oh What a Beautlful Morning" | 2009 | Lisa Mitchell | Wonder | Producer | - | - |
| "Neopolitan Dreams" | 2009 | Lisa Mitchell | Wonder | Producer | - | - |
| "Pirouette" | 2009 | Lisa Mitchell | Wonder | Producer | - | - |
| "Love Letter" | 2009 | Lisa Mitchell | Wonder | Producer | - | - |
| "Oh! Hark!" | 2009 | Lisa Mitchell | Wonder | Producer | - | - |
| "Red Wine Lips" | 2009 | Lisa Mitchell | Wonder | Producer | - | - |
| "Valium" | 2009 | Lisa Mitchell | Wonder | Producer | - | - |
| "Time Means Nothing at All" | 2009 | Lisa Mitchell | Wonder | Producer | - | - |
| "Bless This Mess" | 2012 | Lisa Mitchell | Bless This Mess | Producer | - | - |
| "Providence" | 2012 | Lisa Mitchell | Bless This Mess | Producer | - | - |
| "So Much to Say" | 2012 | Lisa Mitchell | Bless This Mess | Producer | - | - |
| "Spiritus" | 2012 | Lisa Mitchell | Bless This Mess | Producer | - | - |
| "The Land Beyond the Front Door" | 2012 | Lisa Mitchell | Bless This Mess | Producer | - | - |
| "The Story of the Raven and the Mushroom Man" | 2012 | Lisa Mitchell | Bless This Mess | Producer | - | - |
| "Better Left Unsaid" | 2012 | Lisa Mitchell | Bless This Mess | Producer | - | - |
| "The Present" | 2012 | Lisa Mitchell | Bless This Mess | Producer | - | - |
| "Walk With Me" | 2012 | Lisa Mitchell | Bless This Mess | Producer | - | - |
| "You Pretty Thing" | 2012 | Lisa Mitchell | Bless This Mess | Producer | - | - |
| "Diamond in the Rough" | 2012 | Lisa Mitchell | Bless This Mess | Producer | - | - |
| "I Know You're Somewhere" | 2012 | Lisa Mitchell | Bless This Mess | Producer | - | - |
| "Bring Me Love" | 2014 | Tina Arena | Reset | Producer | - | - |
| "The Quiet" | 2015 | Troye Sivan | Blue Neighbourhood | Co-writer/Producer | Troye Mellet | SLUMS, Alex JL Hiew |
| "Monday" | 2015 | Matt Corby | Telluric | Co-writer/Producer | Matthew Corby | Matt Corby |
| "Belly Side Up" | 2016 | Matt Corby | Telluric | Co-writer/Producer | Matthew Corby | Matt Corby |
| "Knife Edge" | 2016 | Matt Corby | Telluric | Co-writer/Producer | Matthew Corby | Matt Corby |
| "Oh Oh Oh" | 2016 | Matt Corby | Telluric | Co-writer/Producer | Matthew Corby | Matt Corby |
| "Wrong Man" | 2016 | Matt Corby | Telluric | Co-writer/Producer | Matthew Corby | Matt Corby |
| "Sooth Lady Wine" | 2016 | Matt Corby | Telluric | Co-writer/Producer | Matthew Corby, John Henriksson | Matt Corby |
| "Do You No Harm" | 2016 | Matt Corby | Telluric | Co-writer/Producer | Matthew Corby | Matt Corby |
| "We Could Be Friends" | 2016 | Matt Corby | Telluric | Co-writer/Producer | Matthew Corby | Matt Corby |
| "Why Dream" | 2016 | Matt Corby | Telluric | Co-writer/Producer | Matthew Corby, John Henriksson | Matt Corby |
| "Good to Be Alone" | 2016 | Matt Corby | Telluric | Producer | - | Matt Corby |
| "Empires Attraction" | 2016 | Matt Corby | Telluric | Co-writer/Producer | Matthew Corby | Matt Corby |
| "Providence" | 2016 | The Temper Trap | Thick as Thieves | Co-writer/Producer | Jonathon Aherne, Toby Dundas, Joseph Greer, Dougy Mandagi | - |
| "Outcast at Last" | 2016 | Sticky Fingers | Westway (The Glitter & the Slums) | Producer | - | - |
| "Our Town" | 2016 | Sticky Fingers | Westway (The Glitter & the Slums) | Co-writer/Producer | Daniel Neurath, Dylan Frost, Eric da Silva Gruener, Paddy Cornwall, Seamus Coyle | - |
| "Carry On" (featuring Killer Mike) | 2016 | Tkay Maidza | Tkay | Co-writer/Producer | Takudzwa Maidza, Michael Render | - |
| "One by One" | 2016 | Sticky Fingers | Westway (The Glitter & the Slums) | Producer | - | - |
| "Sad Songs" | 2016 | Sticky Fingers | Westway (The Glitter & the Slums) | Producer | - | - |
| "Angel" | 2016 | Sticky Fingers | Westway (The Glitter & the Slums) | Producer | - | - |
| "Westway" | 2016 | Sticky Fingers | Westway (The Glitter & the Slums) | Co-writer/Producer | Daniel Neurath, Dylan Frost, Eric da Silva Gruener, Paddy Cornwall, Seamus Coyle | - |
| "Something Strange" | 2016 | Sticky Fingers | Westway (The Glitter & the Slums) | Producer | - | - |
| "Flight 101" | 2016 | Sticky Fingers | Westway (The Glitter & the Slums) | Co-writer/Producer | Daniel Neurath, Dylan Frost, Eric da Silva Gruener, Paddy Cornwall, Seamus Coyle | - |
| "Tongue & Cheek" | 2016 | Sticky Fingers | Westway (The Glitter & the Slums) | Producer | - | - |
| "Amillionite" | 2016 | Sticky Fingers | Westway (The Glitter & the Slums) | Producer | - | - |
| "No Divide" | 2016 | Sticky Fingers | Westway (The Glitter & the Slums) | Producer | - | - |
| "Everybody's Talkin' Bout It" | 2016 | Sticky Fingers | Westway (The Glitter & the Slums) | Producer | - | - |
| "The Sweet Spot" | 2016 | Jess Kent | My Name is Jess Kent EP | Producer | - | Nicky Night Time |
| "Trolls" | 2016 | Jess Kent | My Name is Jess Kent EP | Co-writer/Producer | Jessica Kent | - |
| "Low Key" | 2016 | Jess Kent | My Name is Jess Kent EP | Co-writer/Producer | Jessica Kent | Andrew Klippel |
| "Damage Done" | 2016 | Kita Alexander | Hotel EP | Co-writer/Producer | Kita Alexander, Nicholas Ruth | Nick Ruth |
| "Weekends" | 2017 | Amy Shark | Night Thinker EP | Producer | - | - |
| "Off White Limousine" | 2017 | Client Liaison | Diplomatic Immunity | Co-writer/Producer | Harvey Miller, Monte Morgan, Benjamin Hudson McIldowie | Client Liaison |
| "Bravado" | 2017 | Kirin J. Callinan | Bravado | Co-writer/Producer | Kirin J. Callinan, Andrew Klippel | - |
| "Drive You Mad" | 2017 | Amy Shark | Night Thinker EP | Producer | - | - |
| "Hotel" | 2017 | Kita Alexander | Hotel EP | Co-writer/Producer | Kita Alexander | - |
| "I Said Hi" | 2018 | Amy Shark | Love Monster | Producer | - | M-Phazes |
| "Kick On" | 2018 | Sticky Fingers | Yours to Keep | Producer | - | - |
| "Survival in the City" | 2018 | Client Liaison | Non-album single | Co-writer/Producer | Harvey Miller, Monte Morgan | - |
| "Can I Shower At Yours?" | 2023 | Amy Shark | Sunday Sadness | Producer | - | - |
| PIRATE RADIO | 2025 | Genesis Owusu | Redstar Wu and the Worldwide Scourge | Co-Writer/Producer | Kofi Owusu-Ansah | - |
| Death Cult Zombie | 2025 | Genesis Owusu | Redstar Wu and the Worldwide Scourge | Co-Writer/Producer | Kofi Owusu-Ansah | - |
| Stampede | 2026 | Genesis Owusu | Redstar Wu and the Worldwide Scourge | Co-Writer/Producer | Kofi Owusu-Ansah | - |
| Life Keeps Going | 2026 | Genesis Owusu | Redstar Wu and the Worldwide Scourge | Co-Writer/Producer | Kofi Owusu-Ansah | Andrew Klippel |
