= Jon Hume =

New Zealand musician

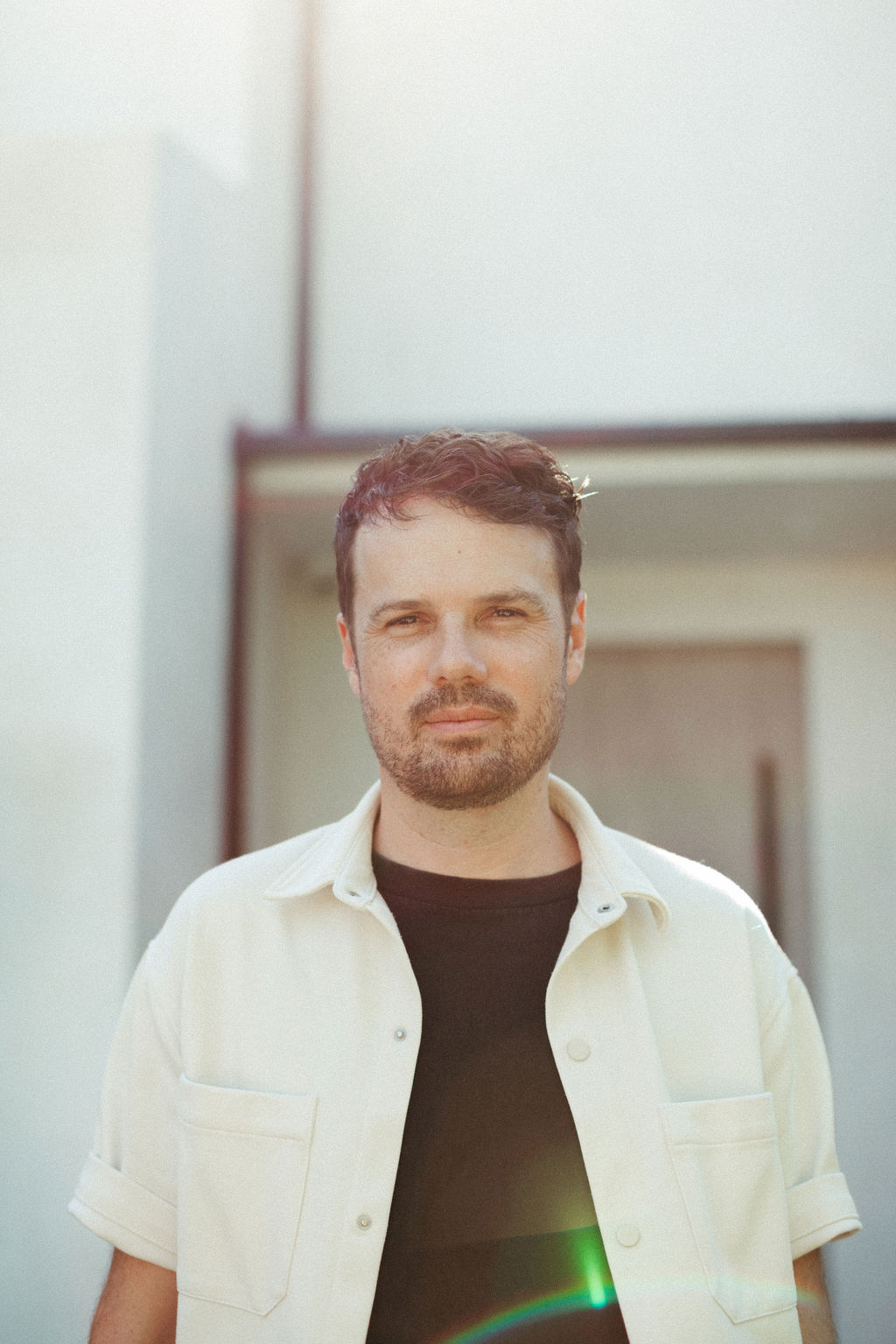
- Hume in 2025

Background information
- Born: Jonathan Daniel Cobbe; Lismore, New South Wales, Australia
- Origin: Feilding, New Zealand
- Genres: Alternative rock; pop
- Occupations: Musician, producer, songwriter
- Instruments: Electric and acoustic guitars; vocals; piano; 12 string guitar; ukulele; percussion; keyboards; bass guitar; drums; programming
- Years active: 1999–present
- Label: Independent
- Website: www.newtribemusic.com

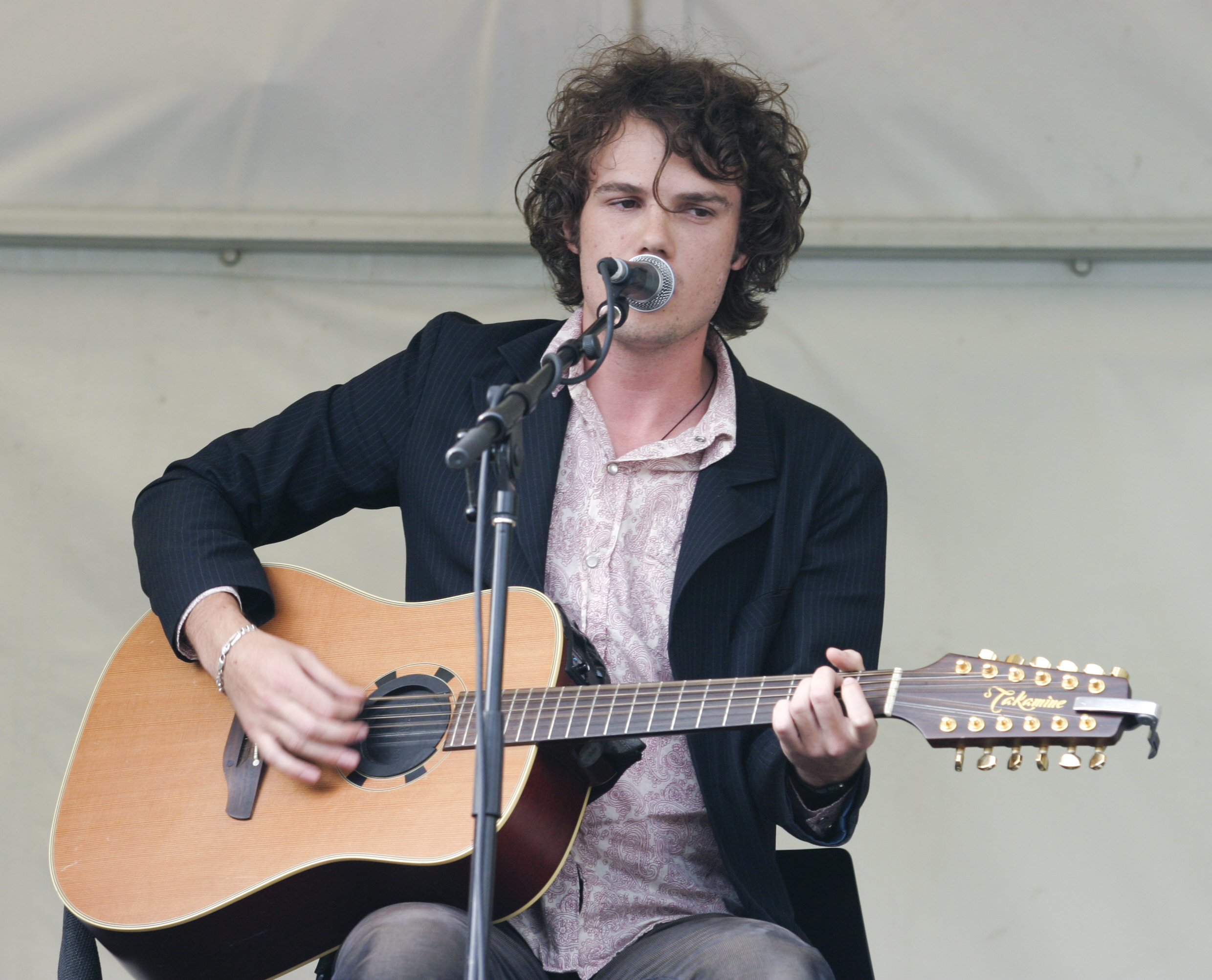
Hume with Evermore in 2005

Jon Cobbe Hume (born Jonathan Daniel Cobbe) is an Australian-born New Zealand musician, songwriter and producer based between Los Angeles and Nashville. He has written and produced songs for JP Cooper, Galantis, Bebe Rexha, Guy Sebastian, Sofi Tukker, Dean Lewis, Icona Pop, Elle King, Joshua Bassett, Wilder Woods and Zhu. He is also known as the eldest of three brothers (with Peter and Dann Hume) who made up the New Zealand band Evermore (1999–2014), of which he was the lead singer.

In 2019 Hume and Lewis were acknowledged by APRA AMCOS for co-writing "Be Alright" when it was added to their billion streams list. At the APRA Music Awards of 2023, Hume won Most Performed Alternative Work for co-writing "Hurtless" with Lewis; it was also nominated for Most Performed Australian Work. Hume's song "Don't Forget" featured as the opening theme song of Welcome to Wrexham since the second season.

== Select Discography ==
Year	Song	Artist	Album	Credit
2018	"Be Alright"	Dean Lewis	A Place We Knew	Co-Writer
2018	"Woman"	BoA	WOMAN	Co-Writer
2018	"Flat Earth"	Urthboy	Turning Circle	Co-Writer, Producer
2018	"So Loud"	Nat Conway	Single	Co-Writer
2018	"Big Bushy Mustache"	Jake Shears	Jake Shears	Co-Writer
2018	"Just Wanna Dance"	Spencer Ludwig	Single	Co-Writer, Producer
2018	"Currency"	Ivy Adara	Intraduction	Co-Writer, Producer
2018	"Famous"	Ivy Adara	Intraduction	Co-Writer, Producer
2018	"Callgirl"	Ivy Adara	Intraduction	Co-Writer, Producer
2018	"Fly"	Kira Puru	Kira Puru - EP	Co-Writer, Producer
2018	"Molotov"	Kira Puru	Kira Puru - EP	Co-Writer, Producer
2018	"Say Something"	Kira Puru	Kira Puru - EP	Co-Writer, Producer
2018	"Fuck They"	SOFI TUKKER	Treehouse	Co-Writer, Producer
2018	"Benadryl"	SOFI TUKKER	Treehouse	Co-Writer, Producer
2018	"Batshit"	SOFI TUKKER	Treehouse	Co-Writer, Producer
2018	"Never Over You"	Rozzi	Bad Together	Co-Writer
2019	"Half a Man"	Dean Lewis	A Place We Knew	Co-Writer
2019	"Purple Hat"	Sofi Tukker	Dancing on the People	Co-Writer
2019	"Die Young"	Sheppard	Kaleidoscope Eyes	Co-Writer, Producer
2019	"Don't Hold Me"	Dean Lewis	A Place We Knew	Co-Writer
2019	"Paper Hearts"	Busby Marou	The Great Divide	Co-Writer
2019	"Gone"	Busby Marou	The Great Divide	Co-Writer
2019	"Why Don't We Get Along"	Kira Puru	Single	Co-Writer, Producer
2019	"Everything is Better Without You"	Kira Puru	Single	Co-Writer, Producer
2019	"Swing"	SOFI TUKKER	DANCING ON THE PEOPLE	Co-Writer, Producer
2019	"Ringless"	SOFI TUKKER	DANCING ON THE PEOPLE	Co-Writer, Producer
2019	"Fantasy"	SOFI TUKKER	DANCING ON THE PEOPLE	Co-Writer, Producer
2019	"Like This"	SOFI TUKKER	DANCING ON THE PEOPLE	Co-Writer, Producer
2019	"Playa Grande"	SOFI TUKKER	DANCING ON THE PEOPLE	Co-Writer, Producer
2020	"Dead Celebrities"	Easy Life	Junk Food	Co-Writer, Producer
2020	"Feeling Good"	Sofi Tukker	Birds of Prey (soundtrack)	Co-Writer, Producer
2020	"Arms Around Me"	Starley	One of One	Co-Writer
2020	"Another You"	Elle King	Single	Co-Writer
2020	"I Got to Live"	Sam Fischer	Homework	Co-Writer, Producer
2020	"Wrong"	Ryan Riback	Single	Co-Writer
2020	"Dust It Off"	Lonely Disco	Single	Co-Writer
2020	"Loose Belt Drive"	Didirri	Sold for Sale	Co-Writer
2020	"Holding On"	Kyle Lionhart	Too Young	Co-Writer, Producer
2020	"Happy Now"	Kyle Lionhart	Too Young	Co-Writer, Producer
2021	"Sabotage"	Bebe Rexha	Better Mistakes	Co-Writer, Vocal Producer
2021	"Die Young"	Sheppard	Kaleidoscope Eyes	Co-Writer, Producer
2021	"On My Way"	Sheppard	Highest of Highs	Co-Writer, Producer
2021	"GOOD4U"	ZHU	DREAMLAND	Co-Writer
2021	"Tell You Enough"	Jessie James Decker	The Woman I've Become	Co-Writer
2021	"It's You, Not Me"	Masked Wolf & Bebe Rexha	Single	Co-Writer
2021	"Don't Make Me"	WALK THE MOON	Heights	Co-Writer
2022	"How Do I Say Goodbye"	Dean Lewis	The Hardest Love	Co-Writer, Producer
2022	"Hurtless"	Dean Lewis	The Hardest Love	Co-Writer, Producer
2022	"Small Disasters"	Dean Lewis	The Hardest Love	Co-Writer
2022	"Sorry"	Joshua Bassett	Single	Co-Writer, Producer
2022	"Would You Love Me Now?"	Joshua Bassett	Single	Co-Writer, Producer
2022	"Talk Of The Town"	Needtobreathe	Single	Co-Writer
2022	"Wet Tennis"	Sofi Tukker	Wet Tennis	Co-Writer
2022	"Cross Your Mind"	Calum Scott	Bridges	Co-Writer, Producer
2022	"Break My Heart"	Matt Hansen	Single	Co-Writer, Producer
2022	"I Lost Myself In Loving You"	Jamie Miller	Single	Co-Writer, Producer
2022	"Devil I Know"	Suki Waterhouse	I Can't Let Go	Co-Writer
2022	"i'm sorry"	Joshua Bassett	Single	Co-Writer, Producer
2022	"One Too Many Times"	Kyle Lionhart	The Silence Of You	Co-Writer
2022	"Legends Aren't Made"	Dan	Single	Co-Writer
	"Don't Forget"	Jon Hume	Welcome to Wrexham	Writer, Producer, Performer
2023	"Get It Back"	Wilder Woods	FEVER / SKY	Co-Writer
2023	"Hard to Love"	Sam Fischer	I Love You, Please Don't Hate Me	Co-Writer, Producer
2023	"When You Were Mine"	Nissy	Single	Co-Writer
2023	"Brave"	Goldview	Chapters of An Open Heart	Co-Writer
2023	"Stressed Out"	Haywood	Single	Co-Writer
2023	"Memories"	Dean Lewis	Single	Co-Writer, Producer
2023	"Trust Me Mate"	Dean Lewis	Single	Co-Writer, Producer
2023	"I Wish"	Bava	Imitate	Co-Writer, Producer
2023	"Spa"	Icona Pop & SOFI TUKKER	Club Romantech	Co-Writer, Producer
2024	"Ocean"	Daren Kiely	From The Dark	Co-Writer
2024	"Unstoppable"	Marlisa	Single	Co-Writer, Producer
2024	"Your Were Mine"	Forest Blakk	Undone (Love & Loss)	Co-Writer, Producer
2024	"Poison"	David Kushner	The Dicotomy	Co-Writer, Producer
2024	"Redemption"	Emmy Russell	Single	Co-Writer, Producer
2024	"This Isn't Over"	Abi Carter	Single	Co-Writer, Producer
2025	"About You (feat. Tucker Wetmore)"	BigXthaPlug	Single	Co-Writer, Producer
2025	"Just Like That"	Will Linley	Don’t Cry Because It’s Over	Co-Writer, Producer
2025	"Something It's Not"	Anella	Single	Co-Writer, Producer
2025	"Nobody Knows"	Forest Blakk	Single	Co-Writer, Producer
2025	"Purple Hat"	Sofi Tukker	Single	Co-Writer, Producer
2025	"Hurt Me Now"	Bishop Briggs	Tell My Therapist I’m Fine	Co-Writer, Producer
