= Sheppard discography =

- Studio albums: 4
- EPs: 5
- Singles: 43
- Music videos: 29

The discography of Australian indie pop band Sheppard consists of four studio albums, five extended plays, forty-three singles (including two as a featured artist) and twenty-nine music videos.

As of 2024, the group have been streamed over two billion times and have 34 platinum certifications.

== Studio albums ==
Title	Details	Peak chart positions						Certifications
Title	Details	AUS	GER	NLD	SWI	UK	US	Certifications
Bombs Away	Released: 11 July 2014; Label: Empire of Song, Decca (EOS006); Format: CD, digital download	2	27	51	40	81	31	ARIA: Gold
Watching the Sky	Released: 8 June 2018; Label: Empire of Song, Decca (EOS007); Format: LP, CD, digital download	1	—	—	—	—	—	
Kaleidoscope Eyes	Released: 26 February 2021; Label: Empire of Song, Decca (EOS009); Format: LP, CD, digital download	2	—	—	—	—	—	
Zora	Released: 21 June 2024; Label: Empire of Song, Decca (EOS015); Format: 2×LP, CD, cassette, digital download	8	—	—	—	—	—	

== Extended plays ==
Title	Details	Peak chart positions	Certifications
Title	Details	AUS	Certifications
Sheppard	Released: 17 August 2012; Label: Sheppard, Empire of Song (EOS001); Format: CD, digital download	18	ARIA: 2× Platinum
Undercover	Released: 1 December 2017; Label: Empire of Song; Format: Digital download	—	
Love Was Never Easy	Released: 21 September 2021; Label: Empire of Song; Format: Digital download, streaming; 6-track compilation EP	—	
Highest of Highs	Released: 28 September 2021; Label: Empire of Song; Format: Digital download, streaming; 6-track compilation EP	—	
Dance in the Glow	Released: 5 October 2021; Label: Empire of Song; Format: Digital download, streaming; 6-track compilation EP	—	
Live from the Valley	Scheduled: 25 February 2022; Label: Empire of Song; Format: Digital download, streaming; 5-track live EP	—	

== Singles ==
=== As lead artist ===
Title	Year	Peak chart positions											Certifications	Album
Title	Year	AUS	AUT	BEL (Fl)	BEL (Wa)	GER	NLD	NZ	SWE	SWI	UK	US	Certifications	Album
"Hold My Tongue"	2013	—	—	—	—	—	—	—	—	—	—	—		Sheppard
"Geronimo"	2014	1	2	9	61	3	4	8	8	15	36	53	ARIA: 10× Platinum; IFPI AUT: Gold; BVMI: Gold; MC: Gold; RIAA: Platinum; RMNZ: 4× Platinum; NVPI: 2× Platinum	Bombs Away
"Something's Missing"	2014	35	—	—	—	—	—	—	—	—	—	—		Bombs Away
"Smile"	2014	63	—	—	—	—	—	—	—	—	—	—		Bombs Away
"Let Me Down Easy" (Note: "Let Me Down Easy" also features on Sheppard's self-titled debut extended play, Sheppard.)	2015	—N/a	—	—	34	—	87	—	—	—	—	—		Bombs Away
"Be More Barrio"	2015	—	—	—	—	—	—	—	—	—	—	—		Non-album single
"We Belong"	2016	188	—	—	—	—	—	—	—	—	—	—		Watching the Sky
"Keep Me Crazy"	2017	37	—	—	—	—	—	—	(Note: "Keep Me Crazy" did not enter the NZ Top 40 Singles Chart, but peaked at number 8 on the NZ Heatseeker Singles Chart.)	—	—	—	ARIA: Gold	Watching the Sky
"Edge of the Night"	2017	142	—	—	—	—	—	—	—	—	—	—		Watching the Sky
"Coming Home"	2017	22	—	32	78	—	12	—	—	—	—	—	ARIA: 4× Platinum; NVPI: Gold; RMNZ: Platinum	Watching the Sky
"Waves"	2017	—	—	—	—	—	—	—	—	—	—	—		Undercover
"Riding the Wave"	2018	—	—	—	—	—	—	—	—	—	—	—		Watching the Sky
"Hometown"	2018	—	—	—	—	—	—	—	—	—	—	—		Watching the Sky
"On My Way"	2019	161	—	63	—	—	—	—	—	—	—	—	ARIA: Gold	Australia Decides
"Kiss My Fat Ass"	2019	— (Note: "Kiss My Fat Ass" did not enter the ARIA Singles Chart, but peaked at number 24 on the ARIA Digital Track Chart.)	—	—	—	—	—	—	—	—	—	—		Dance in the Glow
"Die Young"	2019	198	—	66	—	—	13	—	—	—	—	—		Kaleidoscope Eyes
"Phoenix"	2020	—	—	—	—	—	—	—	—	—	—	—		Non-album single
"Don't Believe in Love"	2020	—	—	—	—	—	—	—	—	—	—	—		Kaleidoscope Eyes
"Somebody Like You"	2020	—	—	—	—	—	—	—	—	—	—	—		Kaleidoscope Eyes
"Come Back"	2020	—	—	—	—	—	—	— (Note: "Come Back" did not enter the NZ Top 40 Singles Chart, but peaked at number 33 on the NZ Heatseeker Singles Chart.)	—	—	—	—		Kaleidoscope Eyes
"Thank You"	2020	—	—	—	—	—	—	—	—	—	—	—		Kaleidoscope Eyes
"Symphony"	2020	—	—	—	—	—	30	—	—	—	—	—		Kaleidoscope Eyes
"Lazy Love"	2020	—	—	—	—	—	—	—	—	—	—	—		Kaleidoscope Eyes
"Catalina"	2020	—	—	—	—	—	—	—	—	—	—	—		Kaleidoscope Eyes
"Brand New"	2020	—	—	—	—	—	—	—	—	—	—	—		Kaleidoscope Eyes
"Animals"	2020	—	—	—	—	—	—	—	—	—	—	—		Kaleidoscope Eyes
"Solid Gold"	2020	—	—	—	—	—	—	—	—	—	—	—		Kaleidoscope Eyes
"Learning to Fly"	2020	—	—	25	—	—	21	—	—	—	—	—		Kaleidoscope Eyes
"M.I.A."	2021	—	—	—	—	—	—	—	—	—	—	—		Kaleidoscope Eyes
"The Reasons Why"	2021	—	—	—	—	—	—	—	—	—	—	—		Non-album singles
"Christmas Without You"	2021	—	—	—	—	—	—	—	—	—	—	—		Non-album singles
"Good Time"	2023	—	—	18	—	—	—	—	—	—	—	—		Zora
"Daylight"	2023	—	—	—	—	—	—	—	—	—	—	—		Zora
"Dance On the Sun"	2023	—	—	—	—	—	—	—	—	—	—	—		Zora
"Edge of the Earth"	2024	—	—	—	—	—	—	—	—	—	—	—		Zora
"Running Straight to You"	2024	—	—	—	—	—	—	—	—	—	—	—		Zora
"Sunshine" (with Jolyon Petch)	2024	—	—	—	—	—	—	—	—	—	—	—		Zora
"Beautiful Nothing"	2025	—	—	—	—	—	—	—	—	—	—	—		TBA
"Sayonara"	2026	—	—	—	—	—	—	—	—	—	—	—		TBA
"Beautiful Something"	2026	—	—	—	—	—	—	—	—	—	—	—		TBA
"Night Drive"	2026	—	—	—	—	—	—	—	—	—	—	—		TBA
"Halloween Movie" with Go-Jo)	2026	—	—	—	—	—	—	—	—	—	—	—		TBA
"Feels Like Heaven"	2026	—	—	—	—	—	—	—	—	—	—	—		TBA
"—" denotes a recording that did not chart or was not released in that territory.

=== As featured artist ===
Title	Year	Peak chart positions	Certifications	Albums
Title	Year	AUS	Certifications	Albums
"Spirit of the Anzacs" (Note: First single from Kernaghan's album Spirit of the Anzacs. The single was released to raise funds for Legacy and Soldier On.) (Lee Kernaghan featuring Guy Sebastian, Sheppard, Jon Stevens, Jessica Mauboy, Shannon Noll and Megan Washington)	2015	32		Spirit of the Anzacs (Lee Kernaghan album)
"Up" (Sena Kana featuring Wiz Khalifa and Sheppard)	2019	—	RIAA: Gold	non-album single
"—" denotes a recording that did not chart or was not released in that territory.

== Music videos ==
Title	Year	Director(s)	Reference(s)
"Let Me Down Easy" (Australian version)	2013	Sheppard	
"Hold My Tongue"	2013	Sheppard	
"Geronimo" (Australian version)	2014	Sheppard	
"Geronimo" (International version)	2014	Toby Morris	
"Smile"	2014	Jamie Lewis	
"Let Me Down Easy" (International version)	2015	Matt Stawski	
"Spirit of the Anzacs"	2015		
"A Grade Playa"	2015		
"Be More Barrio"	2015		
"Keep Me Crazy"	2017		
"Edge of the Night"	2017		
"Edge of the Night" (Spanish version with Sebastián Yatra)	2017		
"Coming Home"	2018	Nick Waterman	
"Kiss My Fat Ass"	2019		
"Die Young"	2019		
"Phoenix"	2020	Digby Hogan	
"Don't Believe in Love"	2020	Digby Hogan	
"Somebody Like You"	2020	Jay Bovino	
"Thank You"	2020		
"Symphony"	2020	Bleo Creative	
"Lazy Love"	2020		
"Catalina"	2020	Bel Bare	
"Somebody Like You" (Duet Version as Sheppard x Sammy)	2020	Sean Li	
"Brand New"	2020		
"Animals"	2020		
"Solid Gold"	2020	Digby Hogan	
"Learning to Fly"	2020		
"M.I.A."	2021	Digby Hogan	
"The Reasons Why"	2021		
"Christmas Without You"	2021		
"Daylight"	2023		
"Good Time"	2023		
"Dance On the Sun"	2023		
"Beautiful Something"	2026		
"Night Drive"	2026		
