= Keep Me Crazy =

Single by Sheppard

from the album Watching the Sky
- Released: 10 March 2017
- Recorded: 2016
- Genre: Pop
- Length: 3:27
- Label: Empire of Song
- Songwriters: George Sheppard, Amy Sheppard, Peter Thomas, Kyle Moorman
- Producers: Peter Thomas, Kyle Moorman

Sheppard singles chronology
"We Belong" (2016)	"Keep Me Crazy" (2017)	"Edge of the Night" (2017)

Music video
- "Keep Me Crazy" on YouTube

"Keep Me Crazy" is a song by Australian indie pop band, Sheppard. It was released in Australia on 10 March 2017 as the second single from the band's second studio album, Watching the Sky (2018). It peaked in the top 40 of the ARIA Singles Chart. It is co-written by the band's members Jason Bovino, Amy and George Sheppard with its co-producers Peter Thomas and Kyle Moorman. The song was used in December 2016 to promote the 2017 season of TV comedy-drama, 800 Words.

In an interview with radio station, Joy 94.9's Chris Furneaux in March 2017, Bovino and George described how, "In this day and age, where nobody wants to settle down and everyone is interested in Tinder swipes, no one wants to find someone to settle down with any more because they fear it might become monotonous and boring, but this song is about finding someone who has the opposite effect and keeps your life exciting." An acoustic version was released in April of that year.

== Critical reception ==
Press Party's correspondent opined, "'Keep Me Crazy' is another immediately chantable anthem... to once again ignite sing-a-longs worldwide this year—a tradition for the band that began with "Geronimo" in 2015."

Nic Kelly of Project U felt, "It's a bit shouty in parts, it'll work well in the stadiums they're doing for the Justin Bieber tour and the little 'cheap... wine... headspins...' bit after the chorus is very cool."

Nick Wasiliev from Music Insight rated the track at 7 out of 10, explaining, "[it] lands in the category of the livelier tracks that Sheppard has put out. It's dynamic, it’s a lot catchier; lyrically, it's quite clearly aimed at a young audience out to dance the night away", but noted that with the embrace of electronic beats over the acoustic-based sounds of past tracks like "Geronimo" and "Let Me Down Easy", made "Keep Me Crazy" feeling more "like it's aiming to please."

== Track listing ==
- Digital download
1. "Keep Me Crazy" – 3:27
- Digital download
1. "Keep Me Crazy" (acoustic) – 3:22

== Charts ==
Chart (2017)	Peak position
Australia (ARIA)	37
Australian Independent (AIR)	1
Belgium (Ultratip Bubbling Under Flanders)	26
New Zealand Heatseekers (RMNZ)	8

== Certifications ==
Region	Certification	Certified units/sales
Australia (ARIA)	Gold	35,000^{‡}
^{‡} Sales+streaming figures based on certification alone.

== Release history ==
Version	Region	Date	Format	Label
Standard version	Australia	10 March 2017	Digital download	Empire of Song
Acoustic version	Australia	21 April 2017	Digital download	Empire of Song
