= Hometown (Sheppard song) =

Single by Sheppard

from the album Watching the Sky
- Released: 1 June 2018
- Recorded: 2017
- Length: 3:07
- Label: Empire of Song
- Songwriter(s): Leroy Clampitt; James Wong; George Sheppard; Amy Sheppard; Jason Bovino

Sheppard singles chronology
"Riding the Wave" (2018)	"Hometown" (2018)	"On My Way" (2019)

Audio video
- "Hometown" on YouTube

"Hometown" is a song by Australian indie pop band, Sheppard. The song was released in Australia on 1 June 2018 as the sixth single from the band's second studio album, Watching the Sky (2018).

Upon release, George Sheppard said "With "Coming Home" and now "Hometown", it's pretty clear we've been on the road a lot these last few years. The two are almost companion pieces, with "Coming Home" about how much we love Australia and "Hometown" a love song about how no matter where in the world you are, if you're with the one you love then you are home."

== Critical reception ==
Melvin Peters from Nieuweplaat said it "sounds like a soundtrack to a new film".

== Charts ==
Chart performance for "Hometown"
Chart (2018)	Peak position
Australian Independent (AIR)	2

== Release history ==
Release history and formats for "Hometown"
Region	Date	Format	Label
Australia	1 June 2018	Digital download, streaming	Empire of Song
