= Hold My Tongue =

Single by Sheppard

from the album Sheppard
- B-side: "Let Me Down Easy"; "All in My Head"
- Released: 23 August 2013
- Recorded: 2012
- Length: 3:38
- Label: Empire of Song
- Songwriters: George Sheppard; Amy Sheppard; Jason Bovino
- Producer: Stuart Stuart

Sheppard singles chronology
"Hold My Tongue" (2013)	"Geronimo" (2014)

Music video
- "Hold My Tongue" on YouTube

"Hold My Tongue" is the debut single of Australian band Sheppard released on 23 August 2013. It was a three-track download, consisting of two songs taken from the Sheppard EP (one in a remixed form) and one new track.

George Sheppard said "This is the track that's the most fun to play live. It's the one our fans love dancing to most at our shows. We asked Australia to sing along with us on "Let Me Down Easy", and now it's time to invite everyone up to shake it a little!"

A video clip was released to promote the track, however the single did not enter the ARIA Charts. This was possibly due to the fact this single was released a month after the Sheppard EP had peaked at number 18 and "Hold My Tongue" was included on that release as well.

== Reception ==
In a review of the extended play, Kat Hunter said the song was a "stand out" saying it is "ridiculously optimistic and somewhat gospel".

== Track listing ==
1. "Hold My Tongue" – 3:38
2. "Let Me Down Easy" (Dance Remix) – 3:39
3. "All in My Head" – 3:57
