= Edge of the Night =

Single by Sheppard

from the album Watching the Sky
- Released: 23 June 2017
- Recorded: 2017
- Genre: Pop
- Length: 3:24
- Label: Empire of Song
- Songwriters: Jay Bovino; Amy Sheppard; George Sheppard; Kyle Moorman; Peter Thomas

Sheppard singles chronology
"Keep Me Crazy" (2017)	"Edge of the Night" (2017)	"Coming Home" (2017)

Music videos
- "Edge of the Night" on YouTube; "Edge of the Night" (Spanish version) on YouTube

"Edge of the Night" is a song by Australian indie pop band, Sheppard. The song was written during the band's writing session in September 2016 and first released in Australia on 23 June 2017 as the third single from the band's second studio album, Watching the Sky (2018).

In an interview with Essentially Pop, George Sheppard said: "'Edge of the Night' isn't your typical Sheppard track, It's a tongue in cheek funk pop throwback to house parties and old school vibes. It's an opportunity for us to let our hair down and try something completely different."

A Spanish-language version was released in July 2017, featuring Sebastián Yatra.

== Critical reception ==
Press Party said: "Adding some undeniable hooks, a sprinkling of funk and an unmistakably catchy baritone growl, 'Edge of the Night' shows the band jumping effortlessly from the airwaves to the dance floor."

Katie Baillie from Metro said: "Edge of the Night" has "a bit of a DNCE vibe" and is an "uplifting summer banger with a cool video to boot".

In a review of the album, Stack Magazine said the song "over-reaches, trying too hard to be a party anthem but ending up sounding like a Peter Andre out take."

== Music video ==
The music video for "Edge of the Night" was released on 7 July 2017.

== Track listing ==
- Digital download
1. "Edge of the Night" – 3:24
- Digital download
1. "Edge of the Night" (Spanish version featuring Sebastián Yatra) – 3:26
- Digital download
1. "Edge of the Night" (KC Lights Remix) - 3:41
2. "Edge of the Night" (L'Tric Remix) - 3:22
3. "Edge of the Night" (Benny Benassi Remix) - 3:29
4. "Edge of the Night" (Rave Radio Remix) - 3:06
5. "Edge of the Night" (Black Summer Remix) - 2:48

== Charts ==
Chart (2017)	Peak position
Australia (ARIA)	142
Australian Independent (AIR)	3

== Release history ==
Version	Region	Date	Format	Label
Standard	Australia	23 June 2017	Digital download	Empire of Song
Spanish	Australia	21 July 2017	Digital download	Empire of Song
Remixes	Australia	4 August 2017	Digital download	Empire of Song
