= Riding the Wave (song) =

Single by Sheppard

from the album Watching the Sky
- Released: 13 April 2018
- Recorded: 2017
- Genre: Indie pop
- Length: 3:24
- Label: Empire of Song

Sheppard singles chronology
"Waves" (2017)	"Riding the Wave" (2018)	"Hometown" (2018)

Lyric video
- "Riding the Wave" on YouTube

"Riding the Wave" is a song by Australian indie pop band, Sheppard. The song was released in Australia on 13 April 2018 as the fifth single from the band's second studio album, Watching the Sky (2018).

Upon release, George Sheppard said "It has been a huge journey of self-discovery for us. With the incredible success of "Geronimo" it was a big lesson for us to focus on the music rather than the success." Amy Sheppard added, "Even when we were at our most successful, there was always someone trying to bring us down, but at every point there's been many, many more supporting us and giving us this gift of being able to create music with our lives. That's why you just need to accept yourself and what you have in the here and now — that's really what "Riding the Wave" is about. A long-term career band is going to have highs and lows, but what matters is the music. You've got to keep riding the wave... much like life."

== Critical reception ==
Thomas Bleach called the song "a gimmicky indie-pop track which hears them returning to their roots and while the production is actually really strong and has a groovy feel it's the melodies that weigh it down." He added, "It sadly sounds like a step backwards and not a step forward for them."

== Charts ==
Chart performance for "Riding the Wave"
Chart (2018)	Peak position
Australian Independent (AIR)	7

== Release history ==
Release history and formats for "Riding the Wave"
Region	Date	Format	Label
Australia	13 April 2018	Digital download, streaming	Empire of Song
