= Riding the Wave =

Riding the Wave may refer to:

- Riding the Wave (album), 2004 album by The Blanks
- "Riding the Wave (song)", a 2018 single by Sheppard

== See also ==
- Riding the Wave: The Whale Rider Story, documentary film by Jonathan Brough about the feature film Whale Rider
- "Riding the Waves (For Virginia Woolf)", a song by Steve Harley on the 1978 album Hobo with a Grin
