= Kiss My Fat Ass =

Single by Sheppard
- Released: 26 July 2019
- Length: 2:55
- Label: Empire of Song
- Songwriters: Jason Bovino; Amy Sheppard; George Sheppard

Sheppard singles chronology
"On My Way" (2019)	"Kiss My Fat Ass" (2019)	"Die Young" (2019)

Music video
- "Kiss My Fat Ass" on YouTube

"Kiss My Fat Ass" is a song by Australian indie pop band Sheppard. It was released as a single on 26 July 2019. In a statement Amy Sheppard called the song "an empowerment anthem" saying "I've spent years trying to hide my flaws, to get the right lighting, the right pose, the right outfits all so I could hide" adding "I'm an average sized 12 woman. The thing is, I've been labelled all throughout my life... worst of all, I've sprayed hate on myself. Sadly, I can't say I have met a woman who hasn't done the same."

The song exists thanks to Amy's body positivity movement, "Kiss My Fat Ass". In January, Amy began sharing unfiltered and unedited photos — with the hashtag #KissMyFatAss — in a bid to encourage young social media users to love and accept their bodies as they are. Her first post reached almost 40,000 likes and comments from people thanking her.

== Music video ==
The music video for "Kiss My Fat Ass" was released on 26 July 2019. The clip features singer Amy Sheppard alongside her sister and bandmate Emma Sheppard and notable Australians former Gladiator Tiffiny Hall, rapper Kaylah Truth, Paralympic silver medallist Monique Murphy, activist Taryn Brumfitt and dancer, Jacqueline Quach.

Amy Sheppard said "I only had a couple of weeks to organise everything and I'm so proud of it and I'm proud of all of the women who agreed to be a part of it with me. I purposely chose women who have inspired me and women who do incredible things. I wanted to send a strong message that all bodies look different and despite what someone looks like, everyone has a story and the way they show their beauty is unique.". Áine Ryan from Nine.com.au called the video "amazing".

== Charts ==
Chart (2019)	Peak position
Australia Digital Tracks (ARIA)	24

== Release history ==
Region	Date	Format	Label
Australia	26 July 2019	Digital download; streaming	Empire of Song
