= Zora (album) =

Studio album by Sheppard
- Released: 21 June 2024
- Length: 51:06
- Label: Empire of Song
- Producer: Jay Bovino; Ryan Daly; Sam Farrar; Gladius; Neil Ormandy; Ethan Roberts; George Sheppard; Robin Stjernberg; Whakaio Taahi; Jordan Witzigreuter

Sheppard chronology
Kaleidoscope Eyes (2021)	Zora (2024)

Singles from Zora
- 1. "Good Time" Released: 17 March 2023; 2. "Daylight" Released: 30 June 2023; 3. "Dance on the Sun" Released: 13 October 2023; 4. "Edge of the Earth" Released: 15 March 2024; 5. "Running Straight to You" Released: 8 May 2024; 6. "Sunshine" Released: 11 October 2024

Zora is the fourth studio album by Australian indie pop band Sheppard. The album was announced in April 2024 and released on 21 June 2024. The album's title is reference to the trio's grandmother, Zora. A deluxe edition was released on 8 November 2024.

At the AIR Awards of 2025, the album was nominated for Best Independent Pop Album or EP.

== Reception ==
Mitch Mosk from Atwood Magazine call it "an irresistibly radiant record of life, love, and hope that sees the Australian sibling trio basking in the triumph of the human spirit and celebrating the magic of being alive."

== Track listing ==
Zora track listing
No.	Title	Writer(s)	Producer(s)	Length
1.	"Zora"	George Sheppard; Jay Bovino	G. Sheppard; Bovino	1:24
2.	"Daylight"	Amy Sheppard; G. Sheppard; Ryan Daly; Nolan Sipe	Daly	3:14
3.	"Good Time"	G. Sheppard; Lisa Desmond; Robin Stjernberg	Stjernberg	2:52
4.	"Got to Be Love"	A. Sheppard; G. Sheppard; Bovino; Sam Farrar	Bovino; Farrar	3:48
5.	"Sunshine"	A. Sheppard; G. Sheppard; Stjernberg	Stjernberg	3:34
6.	"Edge of the Earth"	A. Sheppard; G. Sheppard; Neil Ormandy; Ethan Roberts	G. Sheppard; Bovino; Ormandy; Roberts	3:36
7.	"Love Like That"	A. Sheppard; G. Sheppard; Bovino	Bovino	3:20
8.	"Nothing Without You"	G. Sheppard; Bovino	Bovino	3:40
9.	"Running Straight to You"	A. Sheppard; G. Sheppard; Forest Blakk; Whakaio Taahi	Bovino; Taahi	3:44
10.	"Respect"	A. Sheppard; G. Sheppard; Bovino	Bovino	2:59
11.	"Chasing the Sound"	A. Sheppard; G. Sheppard; Bovino	Bovino	3:30
12.	"Dancing on the Sun"	A. Sheppard; G. Sheppard; Cameron Walker-Wright; Jordan Witzigreuter	G. Sheppard; Witzigreuter	4:15
13.	"The Gift"	A. Sheppard; G. Sheppard; James Wong	G. Sheppard; Bovino; Gladius	3:14
14.	"Love Me Tomorrow"	A. Sheppard; G. Sheppard; Sophie Rose	Bovino	2:52
15.	"Play on the Moon"	A. Sheppard; G. Sheppard; Bovino; Chris Rose; Stuart Stuart	G. Sheppard; Bovino	3:59
16.	"Sumrak" (featuring Zora Pugl)	G. Sheppard; Bovino	G. Sheppard; Bovino	1:05
Total length:				51:06

Zora (Deluxe) track listing
No.	Title	Writer(s)	Length
17.	"Sunshine" (with Jolyon Petch)		3:01
18.	"The Gift" (redux)	A. Sheppard; G. Sheppard; James Wong	3:06
19.	"Love Like That" (live in Poland)	A. Sheppard; G. Sheppard; Bovino	3:25
20.	"Nothing Without You" (Uptempo demo)		3:07
21.	"Running Straight to You" (Voice memo)		4:10

== Personnel ==
Sheppard

- Amy Sheppard – background vocals (tracks 1, 3, 4, 6–9, 11–13, 15, 16), additional vocals (2), vocals (5, 10)
- Emma Sheppard – background vocals (tracks 4, 5, 7–11, 13–16)
- George Sheppard – vocals (tracks 1–9, 11–16), guitar (1, 3–5, 7–11, 13–16), keyboards (5), drum programming (6), background vocals (10, 14); programming, mixing (12)

Additional musicians

- Jay Bovino – drums, guitar, keyboards (tracks 1, 4, 7–11, 13–16); acoustic guitar, electric guitar (2); drum programming, synthesizer (6)
- Sam Farrar – drums, guitar, keyboards (track 4)
- Robin Stjernberg – drums, guitar, keyboards (tracks 5, 11)
- Ethan Roberts – drum programming, synthesizer (track 6)
- Neil Ormandy – drum programming, synthesizer (track 6)
- Whakaio Taahi – drums, guitar, keyboards (track 9)
- Jordan Witzigreuter – programming (track 12)
- James Wong – drums, guitar, keyboards (track 13)

Technical

- Stuart Stuart – mastering
- Jay Bovino – mixing (tracks 1, 4, 7, 8, 10, 11, 14–16), engineering (1, 4, 7, 8–11, 13–16)
- Serge Courtois – mixing (tracks 2, 3, 6, 9, 13)
- Robin Stjernberg – mixing (track 5), engineering (3, 5, 11)
- Sam Farrar – engineering (track 4)

== Charts ==
=== Weekly charts ===
Weekly chart performance for Zora
Chart (2024)	Peak position
Australian Albums (ARIA)	8

=== Year-end charts ===
2024 year-end chart performance for Zora
Chart (2024)	Position
Australian Artist Albums (ARIA)	26
