= Die Young (Sheppard song) =

Single by Sheppard

from the album Kaleidoscope Eyes
- Released: 18 October 2019
- Length: 3:55
- Label: Empire of Song
- Songwriters: Jay Bovino; Jon Hume; Amy Sheppard; George Sheppard

Sheppard singles chronology
| "Kiss My Fat Ass" (2019) | "Die Young" (2019) | "Phoenix" (2020) |

Music video
- "Die Young" on YouTube

"Die Young" is a song by Australian indie pop band Sheppard. It was released as a single on 18 October 2019. "Die Young" came after frontman George Sheppard was forced to consider the band's future following a throat injury and surgery in 2019. In a statement, the band said "We began to ask what we wanted next, for ourselves individually, for the band and for our fans. We wrote 'Die Young' as though it was a 'final' Sheppard song; a song about appreciating each day and living it as though it was your last." The song was released as the lead single from the band's third studio album, Kaleidoscope Eyes (2021).

== Music video ==
The music video for "Die Young" was released on 17 October 2019. The clip uses muted colour patterns, haze and militaristic tableaux created by extras as the band communicate a sense of suffocation. Band member George Sheppard said "We kind of took our cues from the opening line 'in a world that's colourblind, we see it all through kaleidoscope eyes'. That was a really cool line we all thought, and that kind of set up the video clip.".

== Reception ==
Jasper Bruce from The Industry Observer said the song "builds on the band's trademark energetic pop sound". Uproxx said "With a pulsating chorus, this song is a confirmation that Sheppard is here for a good time and you should be, too."

== Track listing ==
- Digital download
1. "Die Young" – 3:55
- Digital download
1. "Die Young" (Oliver Nelson remix) – 4:33

== Charts ==
=== Weekly charts ===
| Chart (2019–2020) | Peak position |
|---|---|
| Australia (ARIA) | 198 |
| Australia Digital Tracks (ARIA) | 30 |
| Belgium (Ultratip Bubbling Under Flanders) | 16 |
| Netherlands (Dutch Top 40) | 13 |
| Netherlands (Single Top 100) | 41 |

=== Year-end charts ===
| Chart (2020) | Position |
|---|---|
| Netherlands (Dutch Top 40) | 48 |

== Release history ==
| Region | Date | Format | Label | Version |
|---|---|---|---|---|
| Australia | 18 October 2019 | Digital download; streaming | Empire of Song | Original |
| Various | 22 November 2019 | Digital download; streaming | Empire of Song | Oliver Nelson remix |
