= We Belong (Sheppard song) =

Single by Sheppard

from the album Watching the Sky
- Released: 1 November 2016
- Length: 3:27
- Label: Empire of Song
- Songwriters: George Sheppard, Amy Sheppard, Jason Bovino, A Dawson
- Producer: Stuart Stuart

Sheppard singles chronology
"Be More Barrio" (2015)	"We Belong" (2016)	"Keep Me Crazy" (2017)

Audio video
- "We Belong" on YouTube

"We Belong" is a song by Australian indie pop band, Sheppard. The song was first released in Australia on 1 November with a worldwide release date scheduled for 11 November, and on 18 November in the United States. The song is the first single from the band's second studio album, Watching the Sky (2018).

Sheppard performed the track live on Sunrise on 2 November 2016.

The song is used to promote the 2017 season of Australian cooking show, My Kitchen Rules.

== Critical reception ==
Mike Wass from Idolator said "We Belong" has a "ridiculously catchy vocal hooks and boasts a sing-along chorus" and said it sees "Sheppard exploring '80s synth-funk with enough modern flourishes to avoid sounding dated. All in all, it sounds like another huge hit."

Joe DeAndrea from We Got This Covered said "We Belong" is "Ridiculously catchy and practically 80s-esque, the song almost sounds like a poppier and more predictable version of The 1975."

"We Belong" was the most added song to Australian radio in the week of November 7, 2016.

== Track listing ==
- Digital download
1. "We Belong" – 3:27

== Charts ==
Chart (2016)	Peak position
Australia (ARIA)	188
Australian Independent Singles (AIR)	10

== Release history ==
Region	Date	Format	Label
Australia	1 November 2016	Digital download	Empire of Song
Worldwide	11 November 2016	Digital download	
United States	18 November 2016	Digital download	
