= Small Mercies =

Australian alternative rock group

- Also known as: Seventh Avenue, Blaik
- Origin: Brisbane, Queensland, Australia
- Genres: Pop rock, alternative rock
- Years active: 1997–2010
- Labels: Sony BMG, Modern
- Past members: Steve Blaik; Marty O'Brien; Danny Procopis; Simon the Pieman O'Connor; Shaun Spooner; Jeff "Smoker" Reeves

Small Mercies were an Australian alternative rock band from Brisbane, Queensland. They formed in 1997. They used the names, Seventh Avenue and Blaik, before adopting Small Mercies in 2004. Their final line-up was Steve Blaik on lead vocals and guitar, Marty O'Brien on drums, Danny Procopis on lead guitar, and Jeff Reeves on bass guitar. Small Mercies released two EPs, Is This Life? (2003) and Off the Record (2004), and one studio album, Beautiful Hum (May 2008). Their highest charting release, "Innocent" (May 2007), reached the ARIA Singles Chart Top 40 and was nominated at the ARIA Music Awards of 2007 for Breakthrough Artist – Single. By December 2010, the group had disbanded.

== History ==
=== 1997–2003: Formation and demo EPs as Blaik ===
Small Mercies were established in 1997 in Brisbane by Steve Blaik (a.k.a. Steve Martin) on lead vocals (later on guitar), Marty O'Brien on drums, and Danny Procopis on lead guitar – all attended local secondary schools, St. Laurence's College (Blaik) and Padua College (O'Brien and Procopis). The trio were initially named Psybin Trip before changing to Blaik (styled as blaik). By 1999 the band were renamed Seventh Avenue and also included Simon O'Connor on rhythm guitar and Shaun Spooner on bass guitar and backing vocals – both also from Padua College and both were ex-Nobenn, another Brisbane group.

During 2001 Seventh Avenue were finalists for the Brisbane Rock Award, which earned them the right to play at Queen Street Mall Basement. This performance attracted Shawthing Entertainment's Greg Shaw, who became their manager. The band worked with Stuart Stuart (The Veronicas), Dave Nicholas (INXS, Sting), Trey Bruce (Faith Hill) and Randy Staub (Nickelback, Metallica) on song writing or recordings. They met John Woodruff (Savage Garden, Evermore), after he had heard their early demos, who became their next manager in 2001. He recommended them to Sony BMG.

In 2002 the band's name returned to Blaik, they released material on their official website, such as a four-track, Blaik Sampler (December 2002), which includes an early version of "Innocent". In June 2003 they recorded with Bruce producing at Rockinghorse Studios, Byron Bay. Blaik released a five-track EP, Is This Life?, in November that year.

=== 2004–2006: Small Mercies and Off the Record ===
Under the name, Small Mercies, in May 2004 they signed with Modern Music. They released a five-track EP, Off the Record, on 10 September 2004 on Sony BMG and Modern Music. Their producer was Dave Nicholas. "Pellet Gun", a track from the EP, was issued as a single, it was co-written by Blaik, O'Brien, O'Connor, Procopis and Spooner. It was added to the Triple J play list and in October 2007 it appeared on Power On – Rock Hits 2007, a various artists' compilation album. By 2005 the band's line-up was Blaik, Procopis, O'Brien, and Jeff Reeves on bass guitar.

=== 2007–2010: Beautiful Hum ===
Small Mercies contacted their next producer, Matt Wallace, after he left a message on their MySpace website: "Hey guys, love this stuff. Are you still looking for a producer?" Wallace was at the top of their "wish list" of possible producers. The group recorded their debut album, Beautiful Hum (May 2008), over an eight-week span in late 2006 in Los Angeles and San Fernando Valley, working at The Pass and Sound City Studios. The recording was mixed by Tim Palmer, who had worked with Pearl Jam and U2. The album was released on 24 May 2008, which reached the top 60 of the ARIA Albums Chart.

The first single from the album, "Innocent", was released on 28 May 2007, which reached the ARIA Singles Chart top 40. The track was co-written by Blaik, Procopis and Stuart. At the ARIA Music Awards of 2007 "Innocent" was nominated for Breakthrough Artist – Single. It also appeared on the ARIA End of Year Charts: Top 50 Australian Artist Singles 2007. "Innocent" was used on the TV promo ad for United States series, Prison Break.

The album's second single, "Sorry" (November 2007), made the top 60. In November they appeared at the Bourbon Fest in Sydney, alongside Spiderbait and After the Fall. Small Mercies supported tours by headlining bands, Hinder (October 2007), Nickelback and Daughtry (May 2008). In April 2008 they travelled to the US to perform at the Tribeca Film Festival in New York, Musexpo in Los Angeles and backing Goo Goo Dolls at the Rose Bowl. Through the rest of 2008 they toured Australia to promote the album. By December 2010 Small Mercies had disbanded. In June 2014 Blaik performed as a solo artist after having been in a duo, the Associates, with Stuart McLean.

== Musical styles and influences ==
Small Mercies and their antecedents' music was influenced by numerous artists. In January 2001 Blaik described 7th Avenue's connections, "bands like Live, Counting Crows and Pearl Jam so it's not too heavy... We mainly play covers at gigs but we add our own flavour as well. It's a change that keeps us interested and our influence comes through in the music." He identified his favourite albums: August and Everything After by Counting Crows, Live's Throwing Copper, and The Joshua Tree by U2. Blaik summarised that he "loves great storytellers". As blaik, the band, in June 2003 their website wrote that their sound was "emotional folk pop".

Blaik, the vocalist, described recording Off the Record as "five guys in a room playing rock music... hoping that the music strikes a chord with those who listen to it." It showed the influences of U2, Counting Crows, Aerosmith and Pearl Jam. Jacqui Curtis of The Program felt the EP "offers listeners yet another melodic rock band with ever-so-catchy tunes to add to their rotation of summer jams... [which] delivers five delectable rock tracks." Curtis described how "Pellet Gun", the lead single "couples hard-hitting lyrics and memorable guitar riff... and attacks every listener's past loves with an attitude and vindictiveness that the heartbroken, dumped and hard-done-by deserve. Picture yourself burning your ex's clothes and you'll find the essence of 'Pellet Gun'."

In an interview on Australian Music Online Blaik listed his favourite Australian artists, and specified some of their attributes or albums: INXS and their lead singer Michael Hutchence's ability "to create so much power and emotion"; Powderfinger's dedication and uniqueness, and Odyssey Number Five which had "everything that I love about Powderfinger"; Crowded House especially Neil Finn's song writing capabilities; Silverchair's Diorama which was "a journey from beginning to end"; The Cruel Sea's live performances; and End of Fashion's self-titled debut album, which he opined "represent to us a place that we would want to be in the near future." He also acknowledged AC/DC, especially their Back in Black album, as being highly influential, claiming "I don't think I know a single musician who doesn't have this record and this band in their record collection", and asking "How can you not be inspired by this band?"

For Beautiful Hum the band provided about 50 tracks and, according to Wallace, there was "not a clunker in the bunch." He described Beautiful Hum as somewhat of a "best of" album, as there was so much content to choose from. Blaik told Tim Colman of The Sydney Morning Herald that "There are actually some songs on the record that are four or five years old, they've sort of just evolved as the band's evolved. The songs have progressed to a point where they're really representative of where the band is now." In November 2007 FasterLouder's Melbjuz caught their performance at the Chapel in Melbourne, she felt they provided "Emotionally charged melodies... ringing guitar work from Procopis and Blaik's charismatic stage persona" moving from "a real rock-edged buzz" with "Sorry" to "a slower, evocative track" with "Fools".

American Society of Composers, Authors and Publishers (ASCAP) reported that critics had found that Small Mercies' "sound has elements of Matchbox 20, Maroon 5, Bon Jovi and Nickelback with memorable melodies, along with the heartfelt voice of Steve Blaik and the songs he creates with writing partner, guitarist Danny Procopis." Elisa Scarton of Mediasearch described "how distinctly international their sound is" on the album, where the "sound is fresh, Steve Blaik's vocals are unique and appealing to the ears and the songs fulfill their rock agenda." TheDwarf.com.au website's MikeOwnsYourFace praised "Innocent" as "an epic rock ballad that beckons for lighters and mobile phones to be raised in salutation" but noticed that for the album's later tracks "The band seems to run out of steam, with most of the songs ending up sounding the same as the last."

In an interview in the Cairns community newspaper, Cairns Bulletin, O'Brien described their musical forte: "Rock's such a broad term... we do a lot of harder stuff but we also do softer variations" and that his fellow members know "which buttons to press to make things kick in and when to give space when one needs it."

== Members ==
- Steve Blaik – lead vocals, guitar (1997–2010)
- Marty O'Brien – drums, percussion (1997–2010)
- Danny Procopis – lead guitar (1997–2010)
- Simon O'Connor – rhythm guitar (1999–2004)
- Shaun Spooner – bass guitar, backing vocals (1999–2004)
- Jeff Reeves – bass guitar, backing vocals (2005–2010)

== Discography ==
=== Studio albums ===
Title	Details	Peak chart positions
Title	Details	AUS
Beautiful Hum	Released: May 2008; Label: Sony BMG (8869-712655-2); Format: CD	54

=== Extended plays ===
Title	Details
Off the Record	Released: September 2004; Label: Modern Music (MM0020); Format: CD

=== Singles ===
Year	Title	Peak chart positions	Album
Year	Title	AUS	Album
2004	"Pellet Gun"	—	Off the Record
2007	"Innocent"	38	Beautiful Hum
2007	"Sorry"	54	Beautiful Hum
2008	"Don't You Know Who I Am?"	—	Beautiful Hum

== Awards and nominations ==
=== ARIA Music Awards ===
The ARIA Music Awards is an annual awards ceremony that recognises excellence, innovation, and achievement across all genres of Australian music. They commenced in 1987.

Year	Nominee / work	Award	Result	Ref.
2007	"Innocent"	Breakthrough Artist - Single	Nominated	

== See also ==
- Music of Australia
- Popular entertainment in Brisbane
