= Bombs Away (album) =

Studio album by Sheppard
- Released: 11 July 2014
- Genres: Indie pop, indie rock
- Length: 40:54
- Labels: Empire of Song; Decca; Republic
- Producer: Stuart Stuart

Sheppard chronology
Sheppard (2012)	Bombs Away (2014)	Undercover (2017)

Singles from Bombs Away
- 1. "Geronimo" Released: 28 February 2014; 2. "Something's Missing" Released: 27 June 2014; 3. "Smile" Released: 15 October 2014; 4. "Let Me Down Easy" Released: 26 January 2015; 5. "A Grade Playa" Released: 2 April 2015

Bombs Away is the debut studio album by Australian indie pop band Sheppard. It was released on 11 July 2014 by Empire of Song. The album includes the singles "Geronimo", "Something's Missing", "Smile", "Let Me Down Easy" and "A Grade Playa". Bombs Away was released outside Australia through Decca Records in 2015. The album debuted at number two on the ARIA Albums Chart and was certified gold by the Australian Recording Industry Association for shipments exceeding 35,000 copies.

All the songs on the album were written by Sheppard members George Sheppard, Amy Sheppard and Jay Bovino. The album was produced, mixed and mastered by Stuart Stuart at Analog Heart Studios, Brisbane. Its lead single, "Geronimo", was the first number one single in Australia to be recorded in Brisbane.

== Reviews ==
Bombs Away received generally positive reviews. Toby Creswell from Rolling Stone Australia gave the album four stars and said "These are sturdy pieces that could have been made any time since the Brill Building opened its doors." Arne Sjostedt from The Sydney Morning Herald gave the album three and a half stars out of five, saying, "Bombs Away is an innocent, rhythmic, light fuelled album that keeps you in its grasp for the majority of its 41 minutes. Songs that take aspects of modern/'90s pop, indie and a dash of nu-folk and blend it with something very much their own." Scott Fitzsimons from The Music gave the album three of out five saying, "The record's production is as polished as their press shots, but this is indie-pop that's fresh and not at all contrived" but added "At times, Bombs Away does fall into the pop trap of trying to tick too many boxes though".

Alex Parker of Vulture magazine said; "Because Sheppard's sound is so mixed and the album is filled with laid back tracks, upbeat ones... and ones that just make you wanna shout, Bombs Away is sure to appeal to anyone and everyone. It has the promise to be full of hits which is something you don't see much of these days and it's just a plain old good album." Bree Cohen of The AU Review gave the album 9 out of 10, saying; "Each track is memorable, and has that undeniable pizzazz that is oh so evident in 'Geronimo'. Sheppard are certainly no one trick pony, but they definitely know where their strengths lie and this definitely plays to their favour on Bombs Away. A killer record."

== Tour ==
After supporting Keith Urban throughout June on the Australian leg of his Light the Fuse Tour, Sheppard announced their Bombs Away album launch tour on 22 June. Eight additional dates throughout Australia in October were announced on 4 September.

Date	City	Country	Venue
25 July 2014	Brisbane	Australia	Eatons Hill Hotel
26 July 2014	Sydney	Australia	Luna Park Sydney
1 August 2014	Melbourne	Australia	The HiFi Bar
9 August 2014	Oxfordshire	England	Wilderness Festival
16 August 2014	Staffordshire	England	Weston Park (V Festival)
17 August 2014	Staffordshire	England	Weston Park (V Festival)
30 August 2014	County Laois	Ireland	Stradbally Estate
1 October 2014	Brisbane	Australia	Old Museum
2 October 2014	Melbourne	Australia	Ormond Hall
3 October 2014	Deniliquin	Australia	Deni Ute Muster
5 October 2014	Traralgon	Australia	Kay Street
9 October 2014	Brisbane	Australia	The Tivoli
10 October 2014	Wollongong	Australia	Waves
11 October 2014	Bateau Bay	Australia	Bateau Bay Hotel
12 October 2014	Sydney	Australia	Enmore Theatre
16 October 2014	Perth	Australia	Astor Theatre

== Track listing ==
Band member Amy discussed the tracks on Bombs Away; "I've noticed most of the new tracks are about the restorative journey after being pushed down. Everyone has had their rough moments and we hope our music can help some people through those hard times."

All tracks are written by Jay Bovino, Amy Sheppard and George Sheppard.

No.	Title	Length
1.	"Geronimo"	3:38
2.	"Something's Missing"	2:51
3.	"Let Me Down Easy"	3:47
4.	"These People"	3:20
5.	"A Grade Playa"	3:38
6.	"Smile"	3:50
7.	"The Best Is Yet to Come"	4:07
8.	"This Electric Feeling"	4:02
9.	"Find Someone"	3:08
10.	"Lingering"	3:52
11.	"Halfway to Hell"	4:41
Total length:		40:54

Deluxe Edition
No.	Title	Length
12.	"Flying Away"	3:47
13.	"Hold My Tongue"	3:38
14.	"Shine My Way"	4:34

== Charts ==
=== Weekly charts ===
Chart (2014–15)	Peak position
Australian Albums (ARIA)	2
Belgian Albums (Ultratop Flanders)	93
Belgian Albums (Ultratop Wallonia)	121
Dutch Albums (Album Top 100)	51
German Albums (Offizielle Top 100)	27
Italian Albums (FIMI)	98
Scottish Albums (Official Charts)	85
Swiss Albums (Schweizer Hitparade)	40
UK Albums (Official Charts)	81
UK Album Downloads (Official Charts)	58
US Billboard 200	31

=== Year-end charts ===
Chart (2014)	Position
Australian Albums Chart	41

== Certifications ==
Region	Certification	Certified units/sales
Australia (ARIA)	Gold	35,000^{^}
New Zealand (RMNZ)	Gold	7,500^{‡}
^{^} Shipments figures based on certification alone.^{‡} Sales+streaming figures based on certification alone.

== Awards and nominations ==
Year	Type	Award	Result
2014	ARIA Music Awards	Album of the Year	Nominated
2014	ARIA Music Awards	Best Group	Won
2014	ARIA Music Awards	Best Independent Release	Nominated
2014	ARIA Music Awards	Best Pop Release	Nominated
2014	ARIA Music Awards	Producer of the Year (Stuart Stuart)	Nominated

== Release history ==
Region	Date	Format	Label
Australia	11 July 2014	CD; digital download	Empire of Song
Germany	30 January 2015	CD; digital download	Decca
United States	10 March 2015	CD; digital download	Republic
United Kingdom	16 March 2015	CD; digital download	Decca
