= Smile (Sheppard song) =

Single by Sheppard

from the album Bombs Away
- Released: 15 October 2014
- Length: 3:50
- Label: Empire of Song
- Songwriter(s): George Sheppard, Amy Sheppard, Jason Bovino

Sheppard singles chronology
"Something's Missing" (2014)	"Smile" (2014)	"Spirit of the Anzacs" (2015)

Music video
- "Smile" on YouTube

"Smile" is the fourth Australian and second international single from Australian indie pop band Sheppard's debut album Bombs Away.

== Promotion ==
Prior to the album's release, Sheppard performed "Smile" at BarRat & Jess' Live Lounge in July 2014. On 16 October 2014, Sheppard performed "Smile" for the first time on television on Sunrise. On 21 November 2014, Sheppard performed an acoustic version of "Smile" for Take 40 Australia and The Hot Hits.

== Music ==
"Smile" is set in the key of F.

== Videos ==
A lyric video was released on YouTube on 20 October 2014. Sheppard confirmed via their Twitter account on 3 December 2014 that they were filming a music video for "Smile". The video was directed by Jamie Lewis and premiered on 15 December 2014. The video shows the members of the band stranded in a rowboat in the middle of an ocean as Amy tries to capture the attention of a lonely islander while the rest of the members attempt to signal for help. At the end they are rescued by a helicopter.

== Track listing ==
- Digital download
1. "Smile" – 3:50

== Reviews ==
Thomas Bleach, in a review of Bombs Away, said "'Smile' is an infectious feel good hit waiting to be unleashed. Radio will eat this song right up and is a summer anthem in waiting. It may be a bit cheesy but you can't help but get lost in the music and want to hear it over and over again." Marcus Floyd of Renowned for Sound, in a review of Bombs Away, said; "'Smile' is a cheesy-yet-catchy track that is fun to bop along to."

== Charts ==
Chart (2014)	Peak position
Australia (ARIA)	63
Australian Independent Singles (AIR)	6

== Release history ==
Region	Date	Format	Label
Australia	15 October 2014	Digital download	Empire of Song
