= Coming Home (Sheppard song) =

Single by Sheppard
- Released: 10 November 2017
- Length: 3:38
- Label: Empire of Song
- Songwriter(s): Chris Wallace; Matt Radosevich; Jason Bovino; George Sheppard; Amy Sheppard
- Producer(s): Stuart Stuart; Matt Rad; Sheppard

Sheppard singles chronology
"Edge of the Night" (2017)	"Coming Home" (2017)	"Waves" (2017)

Music video
- "Coming Home" on YouTube

"Coming Home" is a song by Australian indie pop band, Sheppard. The song was released on 10 November 2017, an alternative version was released on the band's second studio album, Watching the Sky (2018).

The band performed the song on Today on 27 November 2017. George Sheppard said "We've tried to capture the joy and excitement we all feel when we get to travel home at last - whether home is a place, a person or a state of mind. It's our most euphoric song to date."

The music video was released in January 2018, alongside announcement of the single's gold certification. The song is used in the trailer for the film, Early Man.

At the ARIA Music Awards of 2018, the song was nominated for Song of the Year.

At the APRA Music Awards of 2019, the song was nominated for Most Played Australian Work and Pop Work of the Year.

== Track listing ==
- Digital download
1. "Coming Home" – 3:38

== Charts ==
=== Weekly charts ===
Chart (2017–18)	Peak position
Australia (ARIA)	22
Australian Independent (AIR)	1
Belgium (Ultratop 50 Flanders)	32
Belgium (Ultratip Bubbling Under Wallonia)	28
Mexico Airplay (Billboard)	17
Netherlands (Dutch Top 40)	12
Netherlands (Single Top 100)	67

=== Year-end charts ===
Chart (2018)	Position
Australia (ARIA)	95
Belgium (Ultratop Flanders)	72
Netherlands (Dutch Top 40)	77

== Certifications ==
Region	Certification	Certified units/sales
Australia (ARIA)	4× Platinum	280,000^{‡}
Netherlands (NVPI)	Gold	20,000^{‡}
New Zealand (RMNZ)	Platinum	30,000^{‡}
^{‡} Sales+streaming figures based on certification alone.

== Release history ==
Region	Version	Date	Format	Label
Australia	Standard	10 November 2017	Digital download	Empire of Song
