= Sheppard (EP) =

EP by Sheppard
- Released: 17 August 2012
- Genre: Indie pop; Indie rock; synthpop
- Length: 19:27
- Label: Sheppard
- Producer: Stuart Stuart

Sheppard chronology
Sheppard (2012)	Bombs Away (2014)

Singles from Sheppard
- 1. "Hold My Tongue" Released: 23 August 2013

Sheppard is the self-titled debut extended play (EP) by Australian indie pop band Sheppard, released independently on 17 August 2012. It was produced by Stuart Stuart at Analog Heart Studios.

== Critical reception ==
Kat Hunter from The AU Review gave the extended play 8.9 out of 10 commenting on the "delicious helping of pop goodness ... danceable melodies, catchy sing-along lyrics... and perfectly whipped harmonies and group vocals."

== Track listing ==
- Digital download
1. "Let Me Down Easy" – 3:51
2. "Hold My Tongue" – 3:41
3. "I'm Not a Whore" – 4:30
4. "Flying Away" – 3:25
5. "Pebble Road" – 4:00

== Personnel ==
- Stuart Stuart – production, engineering and mixing

== Charts ==
=== Weekly charts ===
Although the extended play was released in August 2012, it did not make an appearance on the ARIA Charts until 16 June 2013, debuting at number 38. Sheppard ultimately peaked at number 18 on 21 July 2013.

Chart (2013)	Peak position
Australia (ARIA)	18

=== Year-end charts ===
Chart (2013)	Position
Australia (ARIA)	87
Australian Artist Singles (ARIA)	11

== Certifications ==
Region	Certification	Certified units/sales
Australia (ARIA)	2× Platinum	140,000^{^}
^{^} Shipments figures based on certification alone.

== Release history ==
Region	Date	Format(s)	Label
Australia	17 August 2012	Digital download	Sheppard
