= Good Time (Sheppard song) =

Single by Sheppard

from the album Zora
- Released: 17 March 2023
- Recorded: Sweden
- Length: 2:52
- Label: Empire of Song
- Songwriters: George Sheppard; Lisa Desmond; Robin Stjernberg
- Producer: Robin Stjernberg

Sheppard singles chronology
"Christmas Without You" (2021)	"Good Time" (2023)	"Daylight" (2023)

Music video
- "Good Time" on YouTube

"Good Time" is a song by Australian indie pop group, Sheppard. It was released on 17 March 2023 as the lead single from the group's fourth studio album, Zora.

A music video, directed by Josh Harris was filmed in South-East Melbourne in early 2024.

== Critical reception ==
Trent Titmarsh said "The first single off the band's upcoming fourth studio album, 'Good Time' is fuelled by an undeniable singalong chorus that will soon be lodged in the heads of millions across the world, as well as a whistle hook that instantly brings out the sunshine and makes you want to dive head first into a margarita somewhere on the coastline."

Steve Likoski from Celeb Mix called the song "a pop production masterpiece" saying "It would be an understatement to say that Sheppard's 'Good Time' is just a typical infectious pop anthem, because it is more than that, as it showcases Sheppard's incredible talent as a band."

== Charts ==
=== Weekly chart ===
Weekly chart performance for "Good Times"
Chart (2023)	Peak position
Belgium (Ultratop 50 Flanders)	18

=== Year-end charts ===
Year-end chart performance for "Good Times"
Chart (2023)	Position
Belgium (Ultratop 50 Flanders)	60
