= Stuart Stuart =

Australian record producer and musician

Stuart Stuart is an Australian record producer, songwriter, mixer, and mastering engineer. His recording studio, Analog Heart Records, is based in Brisbane, Australia. His credits include Sheppard, The Veronicas, Dean Lewis and Lee Kernaghan.

== Producing career ==
=== Sheppard ===
Stuart Stuart produced, mixed, and mastered the debut album for Sheppard, including the global hit, "Geronimo", which was a number 1 single in Australia, and a top ten hit in 16 countries. The single has been certified six-times platinum (420,000 sales) in Australia and platinum (one million sales) in the US. Stuart also produced the Sheppard EP (2013), which has been certified as double platinum, and contains the hit "Let Me Down Easy". Sheppard have now sold more than 4 million singles and albums worldwide. The band has signed deals with Michael Chugg, Scooter Braun, Kobalt Music Group, Universal Music Group, Decca Records and the Mushroom Group (Michael Gudinski).

In 2017 "Coming Home" for the band, which was certified Gold by ARIA. At the ARIA Music Awards of 2018, the song was nominated for Song of the Year. At the APRA Music Awards of 2019, the song was nominated for Most Played Australian Work and Pop Work of the Year.

Stuart worked on many songs from their second album, Watching the Sky, which debuted at number 1 on the ARIA charts, 16 June 2018. Stuart worked on On My Way, which was a competing entry in Australia's Eurovision – Australia Decides. The song reached #1 on the Australian Independent Record Labels Association singles chart in February, 2019. Stuart has provided vocal production, mixing and mastering on Sheppard's subsequent releases.

=== The Veronicas ===
Stuart's work also helped The Veronicas secure a multimillion-dollar deal with Warner US in 2005. He has credits on the second Veronicas album Hook Me Up, and has worked with the twins on subsequent vocal production and songs for soundtracks.

=== Country ===
Stuart has worked with numerous country artists, including Lee Kernaghan, Travis Collins, The Wolfe Brothers, Kaylee Bell, Caitlyn Shadbolt, James Johnson, Christie Lamb and Mitch Thomas (Seaforth).

He produced the Jody Direen album Shake Up, which won the Tui Award for Best Country Album at the 2017 New Zealand Music Awards.

Stuart was the mix engineer and music producer for the Lee Kernaghan concert film Boy From The Bush. He also produced and mixed the 2022 Lee Kernaghan album, "Live at the Deni Ute Muster".

He produced, mixed and mastered the album Spark for Golden Guitar Award winner Amber Lawrence. It debuted on #1 on the Australian Country Albums ARIA chart on 22 June 2019. The album was nominated for a Golden Guitar in 2020, and was the second highest selling country album of 2019. In July 2022, Stuart produced Lawrence's tenth studio album, Living for the Highlights, which debuted on #1 on the Australian Country Albums ARIA chart. Living for the Highlights received an ARIA nomination for Best Country Album in 2022, and led to Amber being name Best Female at the 2023 Golden Guitars.

Stuart produced and mixed the album Any Less Anymore for Travis Collins in 2023. It debuted on #1 on the Australian Country Albums ARIA chart on 26 June 2023 and #3 on the overall album charts in the same week.

=== Other work ===
As a songwriter and producer, Stuart has credits with artists as diverse as Dean Lewis, Damien Leith, Brendan Maclean, Brodie Booth, Isaiah Firebrace, Honlly Isaac (PNG), Fatman Scoop (US), Tkay Maidza, Mitch Tambo, The Butterfly Effect, Joel Adams (singer), Hands Like Houses, Massad (NZ), Luke Million, Marvin Priest, Tyrone Noonan (formerly of George), Casey Donovan (singer), Thom Crawford (Thundamentals), and Sinead Burgess.

In 2007, he worked with Brisbane band Small Mercies. Stuart co-wrote their ARIA-nominated single "Innocent" (which was featured in the TV show Prison Break), and follow up single, "Sorry", and helped the band secure a record deal with Sony Music. Stuart has multiple writing credits on the Small Mercies album, Beautiful Hum.

Stuart has also worked on music for numerous theme parks, including Universal Studios Singapore and Universal Studios Japan. He was the musical director for the Universal Studios Singapore show celebrating the 50th Anniversary of Sesame Street in 2018. He also worked on Halloween Horror Nights. Stuart created the music for various realms at SeaWorld, Abu Dhabi.

Music produced by Stuart has been featured in shows such as The Voice, The Block, Gossip Girl, Packed to the Rafters, Bondi Rescue, NCIS, Rock of Ages, The Giver, My Kitchen Rules, 800 Words, Married to Rock, a Subway ad campaign, a Tourism NZ ad campaign, Keeping Up With the Kardashians, Offspring, Bad Girls Club, Teen Mom, Extreme Clutter and American Pickers.

== Other activities ==
Stuart is active as an audio engineering educator, and has given lectures at Queensland University of Technology, School of Audio Engineering and Music Industry College, Brisbane. In 2015, he was a panelist on the "Producer Panel" at the annual BigSound conference. He is accredited as an iTunes mastering engineer, and has been interviewed in Audio Technology Magazine. He has also been featured in a YouTube series featuring pro users of audio software, Cubase.

Stuart is an accomplished guitarist and keyboard player, and plays all instruments on many of the songs he produces.

== Accolades ==
Stuart was nominated for ARIA producer of the year in 2014. Sheppard were also nominated for six ARIA Awards at the 2014 ARIA Awards, including album of the year. The band won best group in the same year.
