= Kaleidoscope Eyes =

Studio album by Sheppard
- Released: 26 February 2021
- Recorded: 2019–2020
- Length: 53:25
- Label: Empire of Song

Sheppard chronology
| Watching the Sky (2018) | Kaleidoscope Eyes (2021) | Zora (2024) |

Singles from Kaleidoscope Eyes
- 1. "Die Young" Released: 18 October 2019; 2. "Don't Believe in Love" Released: 28 February 2020; 3. "Somebody Like You" Released: 27 March 2020; 4. "Come Back" Released: 24 April 2020; 5. "Thank You" Released: 8 May 2020; 6. "Symphony" Released: 26 June 2020; 7. "Lazy Love" Released: 31 July 2020; 8. "Catalina" Released: 28 August 2020; 9. "Brand New" Released: 25 September 2020; 10. "Animals" Released: 30 October 2020; 11. "Solid Gold" Released: 24 November 2020; 12. "Learning to Fly" Released: 18 December 2020; 13. "M.I.A." Released: 26 February 2021

Kaleidoscope Eyes is the third studio album by Australian indie pop band Sheppard, released on 26 February 2021. The album was first announced in February 2020, with the release date and title confirmed in October 2020, following a series of singles. The album debuted at number two on the Australian ARIA charts, 67 copies fewer than Architects' For Those That Wish to Exist at number one.

== Background and release ==
Coming off of three back-to-back world tours, two major album cycles, multiple awards and several years together, Sheppard spent 2019 writing, recording and taking time to discover who they are now. The band rediscovered life outside of touring; Amy Sheppard kick-started a global body-positive movement called Kiss My Fat Ass and became engaged to her longtime partner Lachlan; Emma Sheppard built a caravan house with her partner and George spent time as a father and explore new artistic avenues.

In February 2020, the band announced they would release a new single every month of 2020, leading to a new studio album late in 2020. George Sheppard said "Our forthcoming album isn't necessarily a concept album, but there's definitely a cohesive theme running throughout the songs and a linear narrative that I hope people are able to piece together as the year goes on and the album grows."

In October 2020, the band confirmed the release date as 19 February 2021 and announced the title of the project as Kaleidoscope Eyes, with George Sheppard saying "Somewhere along the album's journey, I became obsessed with the idea of a kaleidoscope. To most people it might just be a tube with pretty shards of glass, but to us it represented so much more." Amy Sheppard added "Each time you look into a kaleidoscope, you are looking at something in a new light. It's often bittersweet, because the slightest change can shift the entire picture forever. On the other hand, if you continue to tumble, you'll eventually find new beauty in a different arrangement of the same pieces. It's a strangely beautiful metaphor for love and how the world seems much brighter when you're in love. That message has managed to wind its way throughout the entire record."

== Reception ==
Professional ratings
Review scores
| Source | Rating |
|---|---|
| auspOp | 4.5/5 stars |
| The Courier-Mail | 4/5 stars |
| Rolling Stone Australia | 3/5 stars |

Poppy Reid from Rolling Stone Australia said "This third offering is a seamless mix of carefree sunshine, heartbreak, and disco-thumped redemption." Stack Magazine called it an "album of pop pearls".

John O'Brien from The Courier-Mail said "In the words of more than one fan, Sheppard have never done a bad song. They proved it again during last year's lockdown, churning out one perfect pop tune after another on a monthly basis. Now the results are collected on this, their third album, with a few new tracks thrown in for good measure... At a generous 16 tracks, Kaleidoscope Eyes offers both quality and quantity, and cements Sheppard's status as South East Queensland's premier pop export since Savage Garden."

Daniel from auspOp called it "the most self-assured, cohesive and enjoyable Sheppard album to date".

== Track listing ==
Kaleidoscope Eyes track listing
| No. | Title | Writer(s) | Length |
|---|---|---|---|
| 1. | "Kaleidoscope Eyes" | Jay Bovino; Amy Sheppard; George Sheppard | 1:35 |
| 2. | "Die Young" | Bovino; Jon Hume; A. Sheppard; G. Sheppard | 3:55 |
| 3. | "Don't Believe in Love" | Bovino; Kyle Mooreman; A. Sheppard; G. Sheppard; Pete Walsh | 3:23 |
| 4. | "Somebody Like You" | Bovino; A. Sheppard; G. Sheppard | 4:04 |
| 5. | "Animals" | Bovino; Pip Norman; A. Sheppard; G. Sheppard | 3:24 |
| 6. | "Brand New" | Bovino; A. Sheppard; G. Sheppard; Keith Varon | 3:11 |
| 7. | "Looking for Love" | Bovino; Jeffery David; A. Sheppard; G. Sheppard | 4:03 |
| 8. | "Symphony" | Bovino; Alice Nice; A. Sheppard; G. Sheppard; Keith Sorrells | 3:31 |
| 9. | "Midsommar" | Bovino; G. Sheppard | 0:39 |
| 10. | "M.I.A." | Bovino; Rasmus Budny; Kristen Carpenter; A. Sheppard; G. Sheppard; Alvin Tengblad | 4:02 |
| 11. | "Catalina" | Tushar Apte; Bovino; Steph Jones; A. Sheppard; G. Sheppard | 3:39 |
| 12. | "Solid Gold" | Steve Aiello; Bovino; A. Sheppard; G. Sheppard | 3:21 |
| 13. | "Come Back" | Bovino; Tania Doko; A. Sheppard; G. Sheppard | 3:44 |
| 14. | "Thank You" | Bovino; A. Sheppard; G. Sheppard | 3:57 |
| 15. | "Learning to Fly" | Bovino; Jesse James Cameron; A. Sheppard; G. Sheppard; Whakaio Taahi | 3:12 |
| 16. | "Lazy Love" | Bovino; Adéle Cechal; A. Sheppard; G. Sheppard; Martin Stiling; Trans Torell | 3:45 |
| Total length: | | | 53:25 |

== Charts ==
Chart performance for Kaleidoscope Eyes
| Chart (2021) | Peak position |
|---|---|
| Australian Albums (ARIA) | 2 |

== Release history ==
Release history for Kaleidoscope Eyes
| Region | Date | Format | Label | Catalogue |
|---|---|---|---|---|
| Australia | 26 February 2021 | CD; digital download; streaming; LP | Empire of Song | EOS009 |
| United Kingdom | 26 February 2021 | CD; digital download; streaming | Decca | |
