= Something's Missing (Sheppard song) =

Single by Sheppard

from the album Bombs Away
- Released: 27 June 2014
- Recorded: 2014
- Length: 2:51
- Label: Empire of Song
- Songwriter(s): George Sheppard, Amy Sheppard, Jason Bovino

Sheppard singles chronology
"Geronimo" (2014)	"Something's Missing" (2014)	"Smile" (2014)

Lyric video
- "Something's Missing" on YouTube

"Something's Missing" is the third single from Australian indie pop band Sheppard's debut album Bombs Away. It is the follow-up to their 5× platinum selling, number-one single, "Geronimo". The single was announced on 23 June 2014 in conjunction with the album and tour details. "Something's Missing" was available to download on iTunes on 27 June 2014.

== Promotion ==
An acoustic version of "Something's Missing" was published on Sheppard's YouTube account on 18 February 2013. On 14 July 2014, Sheppard performed "Something's Missing" on the Today show.

== Track listing ==
- Digital download
1. "Something's Missing" – 2:51

== Reviews ==
A reviewer at The Music said; "The track shows a slightly softer, more subdued side to the cheery, poptastic vibe of their previous singles, but their trademark, uplifting style is still present". A reviewer at VMusic said of the song, simply; "stunning".

== Charts ==
"Something's Missing" debuted at number 35 on the Australian Singles Chart for the week commencing 7 July 2014.

Chart (2014)	Peak position
Australia (ARIA)	35
Australian Independent Singles (AIR)	5

== Release history ==
Region	Date	Format	Label
Australia	27 June 2014	Digital download	Empire of Song
