= Beautiful Hum =

Studio album by Small Mercies
- Released: 24 May 2008
- Genre: Rock
- Length: 42:32
- Producer: Matt Wallace

Small Mercies chronology
Off the Record (2006)	Beautiful Hum (2008)

Singles from Beautiful Hum
- 1. "Innocent" Released: 2 June 2007; 2. "Sorry" Released: 6 October 2007; 3. "Don't You Know Who I Am?" Released: 12 April 2008

Beautiful Hum is the debut studio album by Australian rock band Small Mercies, released through Sony BMG on 24 May 2008.

== Singles ==
Small Mercies released three singles from the album. The first being "Innocent", which was released nearly a full year before the album in June 2007. The song was nominated for the ARIA award for Breakthrough Artist – Single in 2007. "Innocent" reached No. 38 on the ARIA Charts and stayed in the top fifty for nine weeks. It also appeared on the Channel 7 television advertisement for Prison Break. The second single "Sorry", was released on 6 October 2007, and reached No. 54 on the ARIA Charts. "Don't You Know Who I Am?" was released to wide radio airplay and as a digital single on 12 April 2008, it was also on a television advertisement for the Australian TV series, Gladiators.

== Track listing ==
1. "Come On" – 3:29
2. "Sorry" – 4:19
3. "Innocent" – 4:21
4. "Almost Perfect" – 3:40
5. "Stand on the Outside" – 3:40
6. "Beautiful Hum" – 3:43
7. "The Trouble with You and Me" – 3:51
8. "Don't You Know Who I Am?" – 3:56
9. "Feels Like Fire" – 3:52
10. "Save Me" – 3:46
11. "Where Were You When the World Stopped Turning?" – 4:02
12. "Hang On" (Australian iTunes bonus track)

== Charts ==
Chart performance for Beautiful Hum
Chart (2008)	Peak position
Australian Albums (ARIA)	54
