= On My Way (Sheppard song) =

Single by Sheppard
- Released: 1 February 2019
- Recorded: 2018
- Length: 3:23
- Label: Empire of Song
- Songwriters: Jay Bovino; Amy Sheppard; George Sheppard; Jon Hume

Sheppard singles chronology
"Hometown" (2018)	"On My Way" (2019)	"Kiss My Fat Ass" (2019)

Lyric video
- "On My Way" on YouTube

"On My Way" is a song by Australian indie pop band, Sheppard. The song was released in Australia on 1 February 2019 as one of the ten competing entries in Eurovision - Australia Decides; in an attempt to represent Australia in the Eurovision Song Contest 2019. Eurovision - Australia Decides took place on 9 February 2019 and Sheppard performed the song 7th in the running order and placed third behind "2000 and Whatever" by Electric Fields and the winner "Zero Gravity" by Kate Miller-Heidke.

Ahead of the song's release, George Sheppard said "Luckily we already had a song written which was perfect for Eurovision. It has the classic massive, anthemic Sheppard sound, celebrating love and the fire that burns within you when you're in love. We are also planning an epic performance using technology and colour and light to tell the story in an interesting, unique way."

== Critical reception ==
Peter Tuscan from The Music Network said "the track is dripping with Sheppard's textbook gang vocals, four-on-the-floor grooves and overall pop goodness."

== Track listing ==
- Digital download
1. "On My Way" – 3:23

== Charts ==
Chart (2019)	Peak position
Australia (ARIA)	161
Australian Digital Tracks (ARIA)	13
Australian Independent (AIR)	1
Belgium (Ultratip Bubbling Under Flanders)	13

== Certifications ==
Certifications for "On My Way"
Region	Certification	Certified units/sales
Australia (ARIA)	Gold	35,000^{‡}
^{‡} Sales+streaming figures based on certification alone.

== Release history ==
Region	Date	Format	Label
Australia	1 February 2019	Digital download, streaming	Empire of Song
