= Watching the Sky =

Studio album by Sheppard
- Released: 8 June 2018
- Genre: Indie pop
- Length: 46:59
- Label: Empire of Song

Sheppard chronology
Undercover (2017)	Watching the Sky (2018)	Kaleidoscope Eyes (2021)

Singles from Watching the Sky
- 1. "We Belong" Released: 1 November 2016; 2. "Keep Me Crazy" Released: 10 March 2017; 3. "Edge of the Night" Released: 23 June 2017; 4. "Coming Home" Released: 10 November 2017; 5. "Riding the Wave" Released: 13 April 2018; 6. "Hometown" Released: 1 June 2018

Watching the Sky is the second studio album by Australian indie pop band Sheppard, released on 8 June 2018. The album was confirmed in January 2018 with George Sheppard saying "an album is the true artistic statement, so announcing Watching the Sky is a really exciting step for us."

The album was supported by a week of in-store appearances across Australia from 8 June 2018.

In July 2018, the band announced a 30-venue national tour commencing on 10 August in Mount Isa and concluding on 20 October in Gold Coast, Queensland. The tour is their biggest national tour to date.

== Reception ==
Professional ratings
Review scores
Source	Rating
auspOp	3/5 stars
The Music	3/5 stars

Mac McNaughton from The Music said "Kids need this kind of non-threatening, relentlessly up-beat optimism and they'll lap it up" and that the album has "many sickly sweet highs". David from auspOp said "The band doesn't mess with the formula that makes them so appealing" adding "There's nothing terrible about this album, but it just doesn't seem to go anywhere." David praised the songs "Coming Home", "Love Me Now" and "Edge of the Night". Stack Magazine said the group have "delivered" on their second studio album, adding "[al]though not everything works. For example, 'Edge of the Night' over-reaches, trying too hard to be a party anthem but ending up sounding like a Peter Andre out take." The publication also acknowledged that "for every misfire there's a banger to ignite the party", saying "'Castaways' and 'Sorry' show genuine pop smarts" and "'We Belong' and 'Live for You' showcase Amy Sheppard's powerful vocal, which is perhaps underutilised." Mikey Cahill from the Herald Sun said "They ply feel-good, treacly jams that will turn your stomach. Their aim: to serve up inoffensive party pop. They nail the brief on "Coming Home" and "Love Me Now"... they fail on "Edge Of the Night" and … the rest of the LP."

== Track listing ==
No.	Title	Writer(s)	Length
1.	"Watching the Sky"		0:50
2.	"Coming Home"	Chris Wallace; Matt Radosevich; Jason Bovino; George Sheppard; Amy Sheppard	3:55
3.	"Keep Me Crazy"	George Sheppard; Amy Sheppard; Peter Thomas; Kyle Moorman	3:16
4.	"Love Me Now"		3:31
5.	"We Belong"	George Sheppard; Amy Sheppard; Jason Bovino; A. Dawson	3:27
6.	"Edge of the Night"	Jay Bovino; Amy Sheppard; George Sheppard; Kyle Moorman; Peter Thomas	3:24
7.	"Live for You"		3:54
8.	"Sorry"		4:13
9.	"Choke"		2:55
10.	"Call Me Up"		3:09
11.	"Hometown"		3:07
12.	"Castaways"		3:26
13.	"Riding the Wave"		3:24
14.	"I Was Lost"		4:28
Total length:			46:59

== Charts ==
Chart (2018)	Peak position
Australian Albums (ARIA)	1
New Zealand Heatseeker Albums (RMNZ)	9

== Release history ==
Region	Date	Format	Label	Catalogue
Various	8 June 2018	CD; digital download; streaming	Empire of Song	EOS007
Australia	5 October 2018	Vinyl	Empire of Song	EOS007V

== See also ==
- List of number-one albums of 2018 (Australia)
