= Let Me Down Easy (Sheppard song) =

Single by Sheppard

from the album Sheppard and Bombs Away
- Released: 26 January 2015
- Recorded: 2012
- Genre: Indie pop
- Length: 3:51
- Label: Empire of Song; Decca
- Songwriters: Jay Bovino; Amy Sheppard; George Sheppard
- Producer: Stuart Stuart

Sheppard singles chronology
"Spirit of the Anzacs" (2015)	"Let Me Down Easy" (2015)	"A Grade Playa" (2015)

Music videos
- "Let Me Down Easy" on YouTube; "Let Me Down Easy" (International version) on YouTube

"Let Me Down Easy" is a song by Australian indie pop band Sheppard. It was included on their debut extended play Sheppard in 2012 and their debut album Bombs Away in 2014. The song was not released as a single in Australia, but used to promote the extended play, which went on to achieve double platinum accreditation. "Let Me Down Easy" is set in the key of A major.

At the 2013 ARIA Music Awards, the song was nominated for Best Independent Release.

At the APRA Music Awards of 2014, the song was nominated for Most Played Australian Work and Pop Work of the Year.

"Let Me Down Easy" was released as an international single in January 2015.

== Promotion ==
The song received a lot of radio airplay. It also featured on The Today Show, Ten Late News, Nine's Mornings and Packed to the Rafters.

== Videos ==
Three videos were released to promote "Let Me Down Easy"

Acoustic version:
An acoustic version was released on Steve Madden's YouTube account on 28 September 2012.

Australian version:
The Australian version was released on their YouTube account on 1 May 2013. It was filmed using a hand-held camera and has the band singing the song in a car yard.

International version:
The International version was released on Vevo 23 February 2015. It was directed by Matt Stawski and has the band singing outside a window as a young lady throws clothes out at them.

== Reception ==
Eat Sleep Breathe Music in a review of "Let Me Down Easy" said; "This Brisbane Australia’s sibling 6-piece act will instantly charm your ears with their feel, good, finger snapping, toe tapping that is reminiscent of lovable 50’s pop." Marcus Floyd of Renowned for Sound, in a review of Bombs Away, said; "the hook has a beautiful harmonious arrangement and the instrumentation is so simple that it makes the track all the more welcoming."

== Track listing ==
- Digital download
1. "Let Me Down Easy " (album version) – 3:51
2. "Let Me Down Easy " (radio version) – 3:47

== Charts ==
Chart (2015–2021)	Peak position
Belgium (Ultratip Bubbling Under Wallonia)	34
Czech Republic Airplay (ČNS IFPI)	56
Netherlands (Single Top 100)	87
Slovenia (SloTop50)	31

== Release history ==
Region	Date	Format	Label
Europe	26 January 2015	Digital download	Empire of Song; Decca Records
