= Geronimo (Sheppard song) =

2014 single by Sheppard

- Australian version

Single by Sheppard

from the album Bombs Away
- Released: 28 February 2014
- Recorded: Early 2014
- Studio: Heart Studios, Brisbane
- Genre: Indie pop; indie rock
- Length: 3:39
- Label: Empire of Song
- Songwriters: Jay Bovino; Amy Sheppard; George Sheppard
- Producer: Stuart Stuart

Sheppard singles chronology
"Hold My Tongue" (2013)	"Geronimo" (2014)	"Something's Missing" (2014)

Music videos
- "Geronimo" on YouTube; "Geronimo" (International version) on YouTube

US release
- Band members (L to R): Dean Gordon, Emma Sheppard, Jason Bovino, George Sheppard, Michael Butler, Amy Sheppard.

"Geronimo" is the second single released, in February 2014, by Australian indie pop band Sheppard. It was written by three of its members, Jason Bovino with the siblings, George and Amy Sheppard, and was produced by Stuart Stuart at Analog Heart Studios, Brisbane. It is the first number-one single ever recorded in Brisbane and reached number one on the Australian Singles Chart in April 2014. Having held the position for three weeks, the song became the longest stay at the top of the charts for an Australian artist or band since "Battle Scars" by Guy Sebastian in August 2012. "Geronimo" also held the longest stay at number one on the Australian Singles Chart for any independent release. Furthermore, the track reached the top ten in eleven additional countries.

The title is a reference to the famous Apache military leader Geronimo and the custom of yelling his name before doing a courageous act. In the song, the courageous act is about rekindling a love that did not work out at first, comparing it to the act of diving down a waterfall. It is also a reference to the Eleventh Doctor's quote "Geronimo!" in the popular sci-fi British drama Doctor Who. It was certified Diamond in Australia. It was also featured as the trailer theme for the 2015 Australian family film Paper Planes It was also briefly used in Alpha and Omega 4: The Legend of the Saw Tooth Cave, Underdogs and Norm of the North. Sheppard performed the song in the 13th episode of the second season of the television series Girl Meets World, called "Girl Meets Semi-Formal", which aired on Disney Channel on 14 August 2015. The song was a sleeper hit in the United States, where it peaked at number 53 on the Billboard Hot 100 in May 2015.

The Toby Morris-directed music video was nominated for Best Video at the ARIA Music Awards of 2014 and the song for Song of the Year.

== Composition ==
"Geronimo" is written in the key of G major, with a tempo of 142 beats per minute.

== Music video ==
The official music video, which incorporates many costumes and props made from cardboard, tells the story of a rebellion and two war-torn lovers, one played by the band's lead vocalist George Sheppard. The rebels bring to life a Frankenstein-like creature to aid their army. Amidst the chaos, the two lovers reunite and share a kiss. The video was published on YouTube on 1 August 2014 and had received over 58 million views by August 2025.

An 'International Version' music video for the song shows the band performing the song in a warehouse, with various props spelling the word "Geronimo", clips of Sheppard running on a treadmill as various backgrounds are projected behind him and shadow puppets used to spell out the lyrics. This video was released on their YouTube channel on June 23, 2014.

== Track listing ==
- Digital download
1. "Geronimo" – 3:37
- Remixes (US Digital download)
1. "Geronimo" – 3:38
2. "Geronimo" (Benny Benassi Remix) – 4:30
3. "Geronimo" (Matoma Remix) – 3:32
4. "Geronimo" (D-Wayne Remix) – 4:57

== Charts ==
=== Weekly charts ===
Chart (2014–2015)	Peak position
Australia (ARIA)	1
Austria (Ö3 Austria Top 40)	2
Belgium (Ultratop 50 Flanders)	9
Belgium (Ultratip Bubbling Under Wallonia)	11
Canada Hot 100 (Billboard)	74
Czech Republic Airplay (ČNS IFPI)	1
Czech Republic Singles Digital (ČNS IFPI)	5
Germany (GfK)	3
Hungary (Editors' Choice Top 40)	29
Hungary (Stream Top 40)	13
Ireland (IRMA)	38
Italy (FIMI)	3
Italy Airplay (EarOne)	1
Mexico Anglo (Monitor Latino)	4
Netherlands (Dutch Top 40)	4
Netherlands (Single Top 100)	10
New Zealand (Recorded Music NZ)	8
Poland Airplay (ZPAV)	2
Poland (Video Chart)	2
Slovakia Airplay (ČNS IFPI)	8
Slovakia Singles Digital (ČNS IFPI)	6
Slovenia (SloTop50)	17
Spain (Promusicae)	27
Sweden (Sverigetopplistan)	8
Switzerland (Schweizer Hitparade)	15
UK Singles (Official Charts)	36
US Billboard Hot 100	53
US Adult Contemporary (Billboard)	25
US Adult Pop Airplay (Billboard)	10
US Pop Airplay (Billboard)	26
US Rock & Alternative Airplay (Billboard)	28

=== Year-end charts ===
"Geronimo" was the highest selling single in Australia by an Australian artist in 2014, fourth overall.

Chart (2014)	Position
Australia (ARIA)	4
Austria (Ö3 Austria Top 40)	52
Germany (Official German Charts)	42
Italy (FIMI)	26
Italy Airplay (EarOne)	17
Netherlands (Dutch Top 40)	57
Netherlands (Single Top 100)	65
New Zealand (Recorded Music NZ)	37
Poland (ZPAV)	33

Chart (2015)	Position
Italy (FIMI)	89
Netherlands (Dutch Top 40)	51
Netherlands (Single Top 100)	64
US Adult Top 40 (Billboard)	37

=== Decade-end charts ===
Chart (2010–2019)	Position
Australia (ARIA)	73
Australian Artist Singles (ARIA)	9

== Certifications ==
Region	Certification	Certified units/sales
Australia (ARIA)	10× Platinum	700,000^{‡}
Austria (IFPI Austria)	Gold	15,000^{*}
Canada (Music Canada)	Gold	40,000^{*}
Denmark (IFPI Danmark)	Gold	30,000^{^}
Germany (BVMI)	Gold	150,000^{‡}
Italy (FIMI)	3× Platinum	150,000^{‡}
Netherlands (NVPI)	Platinum	20,000^{‡}
New Zealand (RMNZ)	4× Platinum	120,000^{‡}
Norway (IFPI Norway)	Platinum	10,000^{‡}
Spain (Promusicae)	Gold	20,000^{‡}
Sweden (GLF)	3× Platinum	120,000^{‡}
United Kingdom (BPI)	Gold	400,000^{‡}
United States (RIAA)	Platinum	1,000,000^{‡}
^{*} Sales figures based on certification alone.^{^} Shipments figures based on certification alone.^{‡} Sales+streaming figures based on certification alone.

== See also ==
- List of highest-certified singles in Australia
