= Sheppard (band) =

Australian indie pop band

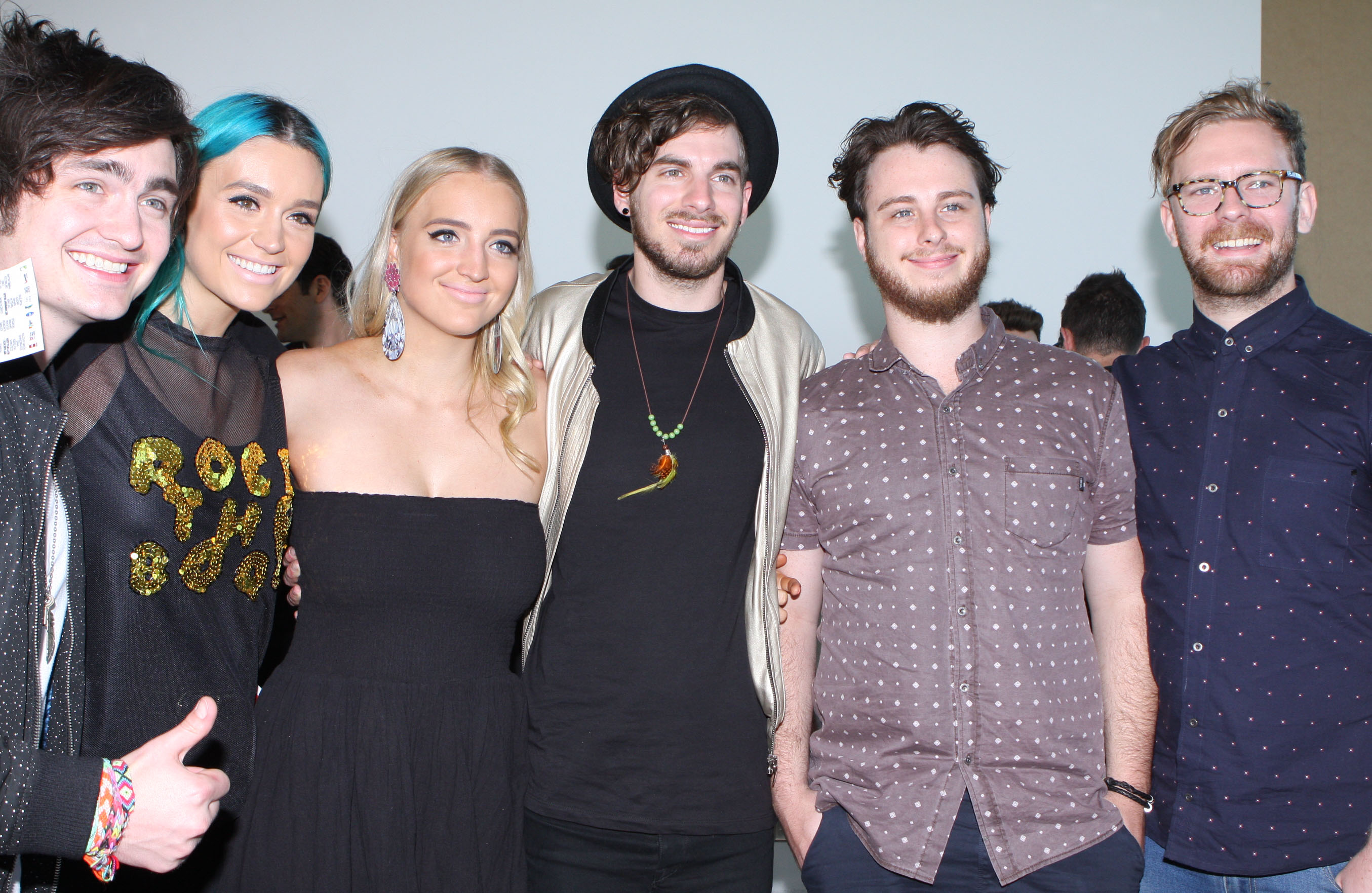
- Sheppard at the Art Gallery of New South Wales in October 2014. From left to right: George, Amy, and Emma Sheppard, Jason Bovino, Dean Gordon, and Michael Butler.

Background information
- Origin: Brisbane, Queensland, Australia
- Genres: Indie pop; indie rock
- Years active: 2009–present
- Labels: Empire of Song; MGM; Chugg; Decca; Universal; Republic
- Members: George Sheppard; Amy Sheppard; Emma Sheppard; Jon Butterworth
- Past members: Jared Tredly; Michael Butler; Jason Bovino; Dean Gordon
- Website: wearesheppard.com

Sheppard is an Australian indie pop trio, formed in 2009. Their debut studio album, Bombs Away, was released on 11 July 2014, and peaked at No. 2 on the ARIA Albums Chart and was certified gold by the Australian Recording Industry Association, while their second single, "Geronimo", spent three weeks at No. 1 on the ARIA Singles Chart and was certified 5× platinum.

At the ARIA Music Awards of 2013, Sheppard were nominated for Best Independent Release for "Let Me Down Easy". At the 2014 ceremony, they were nominated for Album of the Year, Best Group, Best Independent Release, Best Pop Release, Song of the Year, Producer of the Year, and Best Video.

Sheppard were the halftime entertainment at the 2020 AFL Grand Final, performed prior to game two of the 2021 State of Origin Series and in April 2024 became the first band in history to play a show on the Great Barrier Reef.

== Early life ==
The Sheppard siblings were born and grew up in Port Moresby, Papua New Guinea to parents Greg and Linda Sheppard, where they attended the Murray International (primary) School (now part of the Ela Murray International School (TEMIS) chain). The family relocated to Brisbane, where Amy attended Somerville House for secondary education; by 2009, she was studying music at TAFE Queensland Brisbane. After attending Brisbane Boys College in 2004, George shifted to Sydney; there he "toyed" with an acting career before returning to Brisbane six years later. Youngest sister Emma learned to play bass guitar while enrolled at Somerville House; she officially joined the band after graduating in 2011.

== History ==
=== Early years and formation (2009–2013) ===
In 2009, Sheppard was formed as a duo by George and Amy Sheppard. Amy had asked for help on a music assignment: "I had to write a song, and I really wanted to put in harmonies, but I'd left it to the last minute. George was the only one at home". For the duo Amy (born 22 September 1990) provided vocals, while George (born 21 October 1987) was on lead vocals and piano. In 2011, Jay Bovino – George's friend from Sydney – joined as the third songwriter and rhythm guitarist. By 2012, their six-member line-up also included Emma on bass and backing vocals, Michael Butler on lead guitar, and Jared Tredly on drums. Greg was their talent manager and Linda their tour manager; the parents funded the group's early career and established their own record label, Empire of Song.

Sheppard released a five-track extended play of the same name on 17 August 2012, with recording label Empire of Song, which was distributed by MGM. By September that year, they had performed at festivals in South Africa, London and United States. The EP peaked at No. 18 on the ARIA Singles Chart in July of the following year. Its lead track, "Let Me Down Easy", was nominated for Best Independent Release at the ARIA Music Awards of 2013. Its second track, "Hold My Tongue", was issued as the group's debut single in August but it did not reach the top 50. All five tracks were produced by Stuart Stuart at Analog Heart Studios, and co-written by Amy, George & Bovino. Kat Hunter of The AU Review felt that the EP "serves up a delicious helping of pop goodness filled with danceable melodies, catchy sing-along lyrics in addition to light and perfectly whipped harmonies and group vocals". The group played at the Sonic Bang Festival in Bangkok on 24 August 2013, sharing the roster with Placebo, Pitbull, Far East Movement, Jason Mraz, and Owl City. The band appeared at Sullivan Hall in New York City on 18 October for the 2013 CMJ Music Marathon. On 1 December 2013, they performed and presented an award at that year's ARIA Music Awards. By that time, the band had enlisted Dean Gordon to replace Tredly on drums.

=== Bombs Away (2014–2015) ===
Sheppard's second single, "Geronimo", was issued in February 2014 on Empire of Song/Chugg Music. It was recorded and produced at Analog Heart Studios in Brisbane by Stuart Stuart and written by three of the band's members, George Sheppard, Amy Sheppard and Jay Bovino. Brendan Plowman of AdamNotEve noted that the "lyrics throughout the song suggest an idea of taking the plunge together. Risking it all in the hope of something bigger and better that lies ahead, even if it is 'through the curtain of a waterfall' and you don't know what's on the other side," while "the music and repetitive chorus are uplifting and exciting and everyone still can't get enough of it. But it appears this is no accident". George told Plowman how he wrote songs with Amy and Bovino: "We all have very different music tastes ... the important thing to remember when collaborating with two other writers is compromise ... you have to work together to find the common ground ... all of us being happy with it means it will have the widest appeal, if that makes sense". From late April to early May, "Geronimo" spent three weeks at No. 1 on the ARIA Singles Chart, knocking Pharrell Williams' single "Happy" from the top spot after its 12-week run. It is the first single, which had been recorded in Brisbane, to reach number one. Internationally the track reached the top 10 in Austria, Germany, Italy, New Zealand, the Netherlands, and Poland. "Sheppard" was certified 5× platinum by ARIA, for shipments of over 350,000 units.

In March 2014, Sheppard became the first Australian band to sign with Decca Records for their international releases; within Australia, however, the band's material continued to be issued under the Empire of Song/Chugg Music label and distributed by MGM. By that time they were recording their debut album, Bombs Away, at Analog Heart with Stuart producing, again. It was released on 11 July 2014 and peaked at No. 2 on the ARIA Albums Chart. Toby Creswell of Rolling Stone (Australia) felt it had "beautiful and sweet songs dripping with emotion and more hooks than a tuna fleet" which contained "sturdy pieces that could have been made any time since the Brill Building opened its doors". In April, Sheppard opened for Michael Franti & Spearhead at The Metro Theatre in Sydney and the Prince of Wales Ballroom in Melbourne. The band was the support act for Australian appearances during Keith Urban's Light the Fuse Tour in June. The album's second single, "Something's Missing", was issued to coincide with that tour, which peaked at No. 35 on the ARIA Singles Chart. In October, for the ARIA Music Awards of 2014, Sheppard received seven nominations: Bombs Away for Album of the Year, Best Group, Best Independent Release, Best Pop Release and Producer of the Year (for Stuart's work); while "Geronimo" was nominated for Song of the Year, and Best Video (directed by Toby Morris). During the awards ceremony held on 26 November 2014, Sheppard won Best Group. The album's third single, "Smile", appeared in mid-October; they premiered the track on Seven Network's morning program, Sunrise.

In January 2015, "Let Me Down Easy" was released internationally with a new video premiering on 23 February 2015.

In March, "Bombs Away" debuted on the American Billboard 200 at No. 31. Sheppard supported Meghan Trainor on the North American leg of her That Bass Tour across March and April 2015.

In April 2015, Sheppard were announced in the line-up for the biannual Rock in Rio festival, widely acknowledged as the world's largest live music event. The group also released "A Grade Playa" as a single from Bombs Away. The video premiered on 21 June 2015.

In May 2015, it was announced that Sheppard would perform their song "Geronimo" in the 13th episode of the second season of the television series Girl Meets World, called "Girl Meets Semi-Formal", which aired on the Disney Channel on 14 August 2015.

On 6 November 2015, Sheppard released a new single called "Be More Barrio". The track was written exclusively for Pull&Bear and aims to be an anthem for the normality and familiarity that neighbourhoods represent in an increasingly global world.

In 2015 it was revealed that former band financier and manager Greg Sheppard, who is also father of band members George, Amy, and Emma, had been identified in a Sydney Morning Herald investigation in to money laundering of money from Papua New Guinea to Australia. Greg has also had connections to the operations of Manus Regional Processing Centre, sparking controversy over the band's sources of funding at the time. All charges were proven to be false and were dismissed in 2024.

=== Watching the Sky (2016–2018) ===
On 1 November 2016, "We Belong" was released. In March 2017, Sheppard supported Justin Bieber on the Australian and New Zealand legs of his Purpose World Tour. In June and July Sheppard supported Little Mix on their The Glory Days Tour in the UK. On 1 December 2017, Sheppard released a 4-track covers EP titled Undercover, featuring the lead single "Waves". In January 2018, Sheppard announced that their single "Coming Home" had been certified gold and that their second studio album, Watching the Sky, would be released in June 2018. The album debuted at No.1 on the ARIA Charts and the band announced their Australian tour in July.

In December 2018, it was announced that they were among the acts who would be participating in Eurovision – Australia Decides 2019, the Australian national final to select the country's representative for the Eurovision Song Contest 2019. In February 2019, Sheppard released "On My Way" and performed the song at the final of Australia Decides, placing 3rd out of 10 performers.

=== Kaleidoscope Eyes (2019–2022) ===
In late February 2019, the band took a break from performing after George was diagnosed with a throat injury. After spending months on vocal rest, it became apparent that he required surgery, which he underwent in September 2019.

On 9 May 2019, the band announced that Michael Butler had departed Sheppard to focus on a new career path. "Kiss My Fat Ass" was released on all music sources on 26 July 2019. In October 2019, the band released "Die Young".

In January 2020, the band released "Phoenix". In February 2020, the band stated that they are going to be releasing a new song every single month throughout 2020, culminating in an album release at the end of the year. "Don't Believe in Love" was released alongside a statement from George Sheppard saying, "Our forthcoming album isn't necessarily a concept album, but there's definitely a cohesive theme running throughout the songs and a linear narrative that I hope people are able to piece together as the year goes on and the album grows."

In October 2020, the band performed at half-time at the 2020 AFL Grand Final.

On 22 October 2020, the band announced the title of their third studio album, Kaleidoscope Eyes and its release date of 19 February 2021. The album was released on 26 February, one week after its original release date.

In September 2021, Sheppard released the first of three digital compilation EPs over three weeks, titled Love Was Never Easy, Highest of Highs and Dance in the Glow.

On 3 November 2021, Sheppard released "The Reasons Why", a song which made its debut at the October 2021 wedding of Amy Sheppard with Lachlan Stuart.

On 8 November 2021, they announced their first Christmas single, "Christmas Without You," would be released on 14 November.

=== Zora (2023–2024) ===
In February 2023, Sheppard announced that their single, "Good Time", would be released on 17 March 2023.

In August 2023, Sheppard announced they were moving to Nashville, Tennessee, in search of United States success.

On 14 March 2024, the band released the single "Edge of the Earth", which they had submitted to SBS for consideration to represent Australia in the Eurovision Song Contest 2024 but was ultimately not selected.

In April 2024, the band announced the release of their fourth studio album, Zora, for 21 June.

In October 2024, Sheppard collaborated with New Zealand-born, Australian-based DJ and producer Jolyon Petch on the single "Sunshine". The track received full A-rotation airplay across major Australian radio networks, including the Hit Network (101.9 The Fox, 2Day FM), ARN, ACE, and Fresh FM. It peaked at #3 on the ARIA Club Tracks Chart on 11 November 2024.

To support the release, Sheppard embarked on a national Australian tour throughout October and November 2024, with Jolyon Petch joining as the official support act across all dates.

=== Fifth studio album (2025-present) ===
In October 2025, the group released "Beautiful Nothing", the lead single from their upcoming fifth studio album. On 24 April 2026, Sheppard released the song "Sayonara" as the second single after over a month of teasing the song heavily through their socials, primarily Instagram, starting from 10 March. On 11 June 2026, Sheppard announced the third single, "Beautiful Something", would be released on 19 June. On 27 August 2026, the music video for "Beautiful Something", which was entirely set in Brisbane, was released, the first official music video for a Sheppard song since 2024. In late August 2026, Sheppard began teasing through their socials a new song called "Night Drive". On 4 September 2026, Sheppard announced that "Night Drive", the fourth single, would be released on 11 September 2026. A music video for "Night Drive" accompanied the release. In mid-September 2026, George announced through the Maddy Rowe Show that the new album would be called "Beautiful Everything", and he also stated that a producer from Sweden would be coming to Australia in October 2026 and that Sheppard "would have the finished version of 'Beautiful Everything'".

== Band members ==
Current members

- George Sheppard – lead vocals, keyboards, piano, guitar (2009–present)
- Amy Sheppard – lead vocals, keyboards, percussion (2009–present)
- Emma Sheppard – bass, backing vocals (2011–present)
- Jon Butterworth – drums, percussion (2023–present)

Former members

- Jared Tredly – drums, percussion (2011–2013)
- Michael Butler – guitar, backing vocals (2011–2019)
- Jason Bovino – guitar, backing vocals (2011–2024)
- Dean Gordon – drums, percussion, backing vocals (2013–2023)

== Discography ==
- Bombs Away (2014)
- Watching the Sky (2018)
- Kaleidoscope Eyes (2021)
- Zora (2024)

== Awards and nominations ==
=== AIR Awards ===
The Australian Independent Record Awards (commonly known informally as AIR Awards) is an annual awards night to recognise, promote and celebrate the success of Australia's Independent Music sector.

| Year | Nominee / work | Award | Result | Ref. |
|---|---|---|---|---|
| 2014 | themselves | Breakthrough Independent Artist | Won | |
| 2014 | "Geronimo" | Best Independent Single/EP | Nominated | |
| 2025 | Zora | Best Independent Pop Album or EP | Nominated | |

=== APRA Awards ===
The APRA Awards are presented annually from 1982 by the Australasian Performing Right Association (APRA).

| Year | Nominee / work | Award | Result |
|---|---|---|---|
| 2014 | "Let Me Down Easy" – Sheppard | Most Played Australian Work | Nominated |
| 2014 | "Let Me Down Easy" – Sheppard | Pop Work of the Year | Nominated |
| 2015 | "Geronimo" – Sheppard | Most Played Australian Work | Won |
| 2015 | "Geronimo" – Sheppard | Pop Work of the Year | Won |
| 2015 | "Geronimo" – Sheppard | Song of the Year | Nominated |
| 2016 | "A-Grade Playa" | Song of the Year | Shortlisted |
| 2019 | "Coming Home" – Sheppard | Most Played Australian Work | Nominated |
| 2019 | "Coming Home" – Sheppard | Pop Work of the Year | Nominated |

=== ARIA Awards ===
The ARIA Music Awards are presented annually since 1987 by the Australian Recording Industry Association (ARIA). Sheppard have won one award from a total of ten nominations.

| Year | Nominee / work | Award | Result |
|---|---|---|---|
| 2013 | "Let Me Down Easy" | Best Independent Release | Nominated |
| 2014 | Bombs Away | Album of the Year | Nominated |
| 2014 | Bombs Away | Best Group | Won |
| 2014 | Bombs Away | Best Independent Release | Nominated |
| 2014 | Bombs Away | Best Pop Release | Nominated |
| 2014 | Bombs Away – Stuart Stuart | Producer of the Year | Nominated |
| 2014 | "Geronimo" | Song of the Year | Nominated |
| 2014 | "Geronimo" – Toby Morris | Best Video | Nominated |
| 2015 | The Bombs Away Tour | Best Australian Live Act | Nominated |
| 2018 | "Coming Home" | Song of the Year | Nominated |

=== Berlin Music Video Awards ===
The Berlin Music Video Awards is an international festival that promotes the art of music videos.

| Year | Nominee/Work | Category | Result |
|---|---|---|---|
| 2024 | Daylight | Best Narrative | Nominated |

=== Country Music Awards (CMAA) ===
The Country Music Awards of Australia (CMAA) (also known as the Golden Guitar Awards) is an annual awards night held in January during the Tamworth Country Music Festival, celebrating recording excellence in the Australian country music industry. They have been held annually since 1973.

| Year | Nominee / work | Award | Result |
|---|---|---|---|
| 2016 | "Spirit of the Anzacs" (with Lee Kernaghan, Guy Sebastian, Jessica Mauboy, Jon Stevens, Shannon Noll and Megan Washington) | Vocal Collaboration of the Year | Won |
| 2016 | "Spirit of the Anzacs" (with Lee Kernaghan, Guy Sebastian, Jessica Mauboy, Jon Stevens, Shannon Noll and Megan Washington) | Video clip of the Year | Won |

=== Queensland Music Awards ===
The Queensland Music Awards (previously known as Q Song Awards) are annual awards celebrating Queensland, Australia's brightest emerging artists and established legends. They commenced in 2006.

| Year | Nominee / work | Award | Result (wins only) |
|---|---|---|---|
| 2016 | themselves | Export Achievement Award | awarded |
| 2021 | themselves | Export Achievement Award | awarded |

=== World Music Awards ===
The World Music Award is an international awards show founded in 1989 that annually honors recording artists based on worldwide sales figures provided by the International Federation of the Phonographic Industry (IFPI).

| Year | Nominee / work | Award | Result |
|---|---|---|---|
| 2014 | "Let Me Down Easy" | World's Best Song | Nominated |
| 2014 | "Let Me Down Easy" | World's Best Video | Nominated |
