= Amy Sheppard =

Australian singer-songwriter (born 1990)

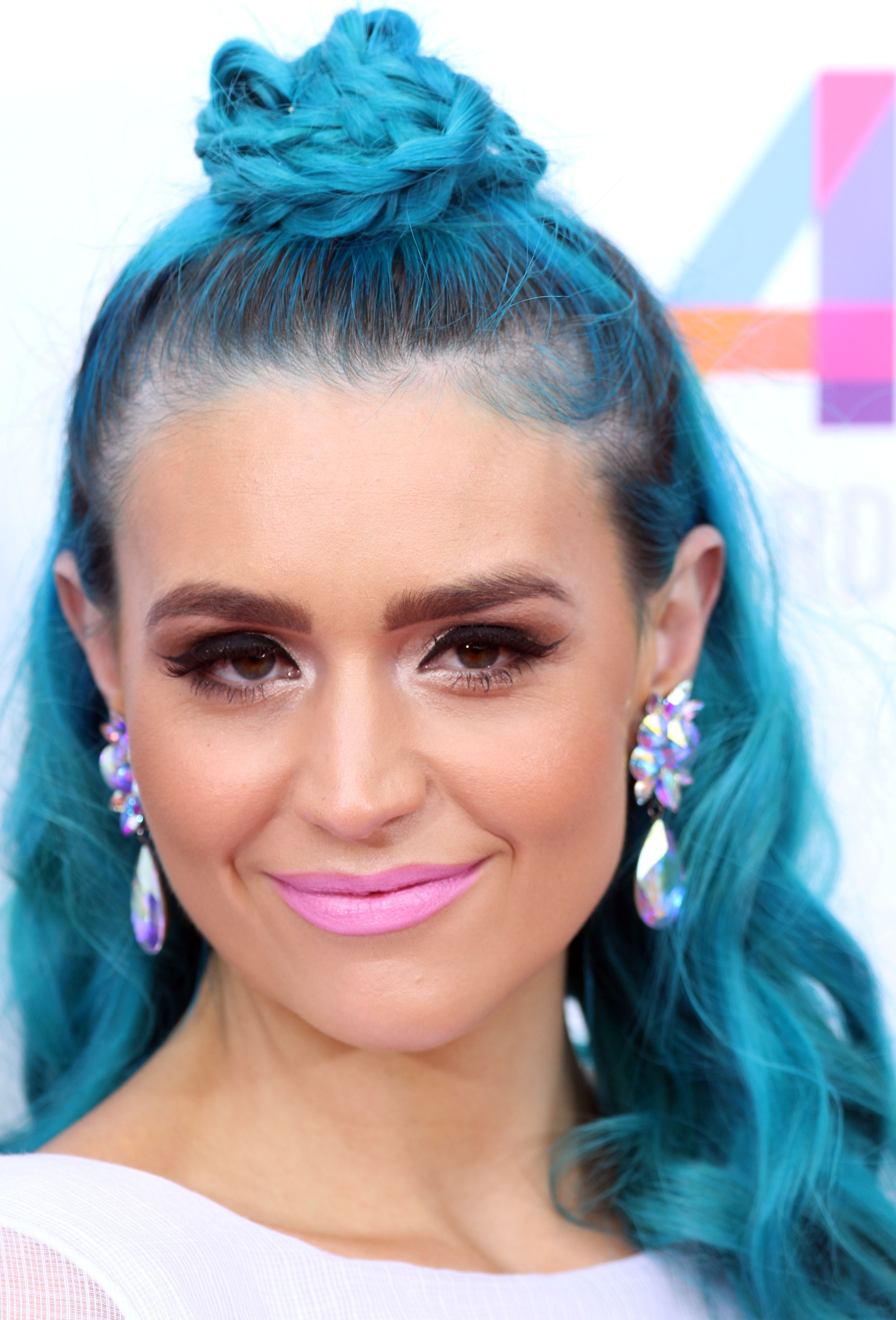
- Amy Sheppard at the 2014 ARIA Music Awards

Background information
- Born: 22 September 1990 (age 36); Port Moresby, Papua New Guinea
- Origin: Brisbane, Queensland, Australia
- Genres: Country pop, indie pop
- Occupation: Singer-songwriter
- Instruments: Vocals; keyboards; percussion
- Years active: 2009−present
- Labels: Empire of Song; MGM
- Member of: Sheppard
- Spouse: Lachlan Stuart (m. 2021)

Amy Louise Sheppard (born 23 September 1990) is an Australian singer-songwriter, and along with her siblings George and Emma, is a founding and current member of indie pop band Sheppard. She released her debut extended play, Nothing But Wild in September 2022.

== Career ==
=== 2009–2015: Formation of Sheppard ===
In 2009, Sheppard and her brother George formed a musical duo which they named Sheppard. Amy had asked for help on a music assignment: "I had to write a song, and I really wanted to put in harmonies, but I'd left it to the last minute. George was the only one at home". For the duo Amy provided vocals, while George was on lead vocals and piano. In 2011, Jay Bovino – George's friend from Sydney – joined as the third songwriter and rhythm guitarist. By 2012, their six-member line-up also included Amy's sister Emma on bass and backing vocals, Michael Butler on lead guitar, and Jared Tredly on drums.

Their debut studio album, Bombs Away, was released on 11 July 2014, and peaked at No. 2 on the ARIA Albums Chart and was certified gold by the Australian Recording Industry Association, and its lead single, "Geronimo", spent three weeks at No. 1 on the ARIA Singles Chart and was certified 5× platinum. The album's second single, "Something's Missing", was issued to coincide with that tour, which peaked at No. 35 on the ARIA Singles Chart. In March 2015, "Bombs Away" debuted on the American Billboard 200 at No. 31. Sheppard supported Meghan Trainor on the North American leg of her That Bass Tour across March and April 2015.

=== 2016–2018: Second studio album ===
On 1 November 2016, "We Belong" was released by Sheppard. On 1 December 2017, they released a 4-track covers EP titled Undercover, featuring the lead single "Waves". In January 2018, Sheppard announced their single "Coming Home" had been certified gold and announced their second studio album Watching the Sky would be released in June 2018. The album debuted at No.1 on the ARIA Charts and the band announced their Australian tour in July.

In December 2018, it was announced that they were among the acts who will be participating in Eurovision – Australia Decides, the Australian national final to select the country's representative for the Eurovision Song Contest 2019 in Tel Aviv. In February 2019, Sheppard released "On My Way" and performed the song at the final of Australia Decides, placing 3rd out of 10 performers.

=== 2019–2024: Solo career and continue Sheppard success ===
After she attended the CMC Rocks Festival in Ipswich in 2019, Sheppard began exploring country music. Speaking to Pario in 2022, she said, "I'm a huge fan of country music. We grew up listening to a lot of country music. In fact, I was hearing that music when I was learning how to song write so I've always had a lot of country influences." She added after she "somewhat lost her identity as an individual to the band" and wanted to rediscover who she is as an artist. She said "My whole adult life has been Sheppard and building this amazing career that we have managed to build up. This solo project is actually forcing me to take a deep dive into discovering who I am as an individual, which I think is going to be a huge learning curve for me. But I am looking forward to going on the journey."

On 22 October 2020, the band announced the title of their third studio album, Kaleidoscope Eyes and its release date of 19 February 2021. The album was released on 26 February, one week after its original release date. On 8 November 2021, they announced their first Christmas single "Christmas Without You" would be released on 14 November.

Sheppard's debut solo single, "Nothing but Wild" was released on 21 April 2022. She said "'Nothing But Wild' explores my innate desire to regularly escape the city in order to reconnect with my wild side and natural surroundings."

On 5 August 2022, Sheppard released her second solo single "Blue Guitar" and announced the release of her debut EP, Nothing but Wild. It debuted at number 16 on the ARIA Charts.

In February 2023, the band announced their new single, "Good Time", will be released on 17 March 2023.

In 2023, Sheppard competed as Orca on the fifth season of The Masked Singer Australia. She was unmasked on the eighth episode, after her third performance.

=== 2025: Born to Be Country ===
In August 2025, Sheppard announced the release of her debut studio album, Born to Be Country, scheduled for release on 10 October 2025.

== Personal life ==
In 2020, Sheppard announced that she was engaged with her partner Lachlan Stuart. In October 2021, Sheppard and Stuart were married. On 3 September 2025, she announced that she is expecting a baby in February 2026.

== Discography ==
=== Albums ===
List of albums, with selected details and chart positions
Title	Album details	Peak chart positions
Title	Album details	AUS
Born to Be Country	Released: 10 October 2025; Label: Empire of Song, MGM (EOS017); Formats: CD, digital download	45

=== Extended plays ===
List of EPs, with selected details and chart positions
Title	EP details	Peak chart positions
Title	EP details	AUS
Nothing but Wild	Released: 16 September 2022; Label: Empire of Song, MGM (EOS013); Formats: CD, LP, Digital	16

=== Singles ===
Title	Year	Album
"Nothing But Wild"	2022	Nothing But Wild
"Couple Goals"	2023	Non-album singles
"The Horses" (Home Free with Travis Collins and Amy Sheppard)	2023	Non-album singles
"Overthinking"	2023	Born to Be Country
"Backfire"	2023	Born to Be Country
"Small Town Rumours"	2024	Born to Be Country
"Thing for You"	2024	Born to Be Country
"Mr. Mistake"	2025	Born to Be Country
"Country Country"	2025	Born to Be Country
"Fool Outta Me" (featuring The Wolfe Brothers)	2026	

=== Other appearances ===
Title	Year	Credited artist(s)	Album
"Something Good's Gonna Happen"	2021	The Wolfe Brothers (featuring Amy Sheppard)	Kids on Cassette

== Awards and nominations ==
=== APRA Awards ===
The APRA Awards are presented annually from 1982 by the Australasian Performing Right Association (APRA).

Year	Nominee / work	Award	Result	Ref.
2014	"Let Me Down Easy" (Jay Bovino, Amy Sheppard, George Sheppard) by Sheppard	Most Played Australian Work	Nominated	
2014	"Let Me Down Easy" (Jay Bovino, Amy Sheppard, George Sheppard) by Sheppard	Pop Work of the Year	Nominated	
2015	"Geronimo" (Jason Bovino, Amy Sheppard, George Sheppard) by Sheppard	Most Played Australian Work	Won	
2015	"Geronimo" (Jason Bovino, Amy Sheppard, George Sheppard) by Sheppard	Pop Work of the Year	Won	
2015	"Geronimo" (Jason Bovino, Amy Sheppard, George Sheppard) by Sheppard	Song of the Year	Nominated	
2016	"A-Grade Playa" (Jason Bovino, Amy Sheppard, George Sheppard) by Sheppard	Song of the Year	Shortlisted	
2019	"Coming Home" (Jason Bovino, Amy Sheppard, George Sheppard, Matthew Radosevich, Christopher Wallace) by Sheppard	Most Played Australian Work	Nominated	
2019	"Coming Home" (Jason Bovino, Amy Sheppard, George Sheppard, Matthew Radosevich, Christopher Wallace) by Sheppard	Pop Work of the Year	Nominated	

=== Country Music Awards of Australia ===
The Country Music Awards of Australia is an annual awards night held in January during the Tamworth Country Music Festival. Celebrating recording excellence in the Australian country music industry. They commenced in 1973.

Year	Nominee / work	Award	Result	Ref.
2023	"Something Good's Gonna Happen" (The Wolfe Brothers featuring Amy Sheppard) (Directed by Jay Seeney)	Video of the Year	Nominated	
