= Matt Corby discography =

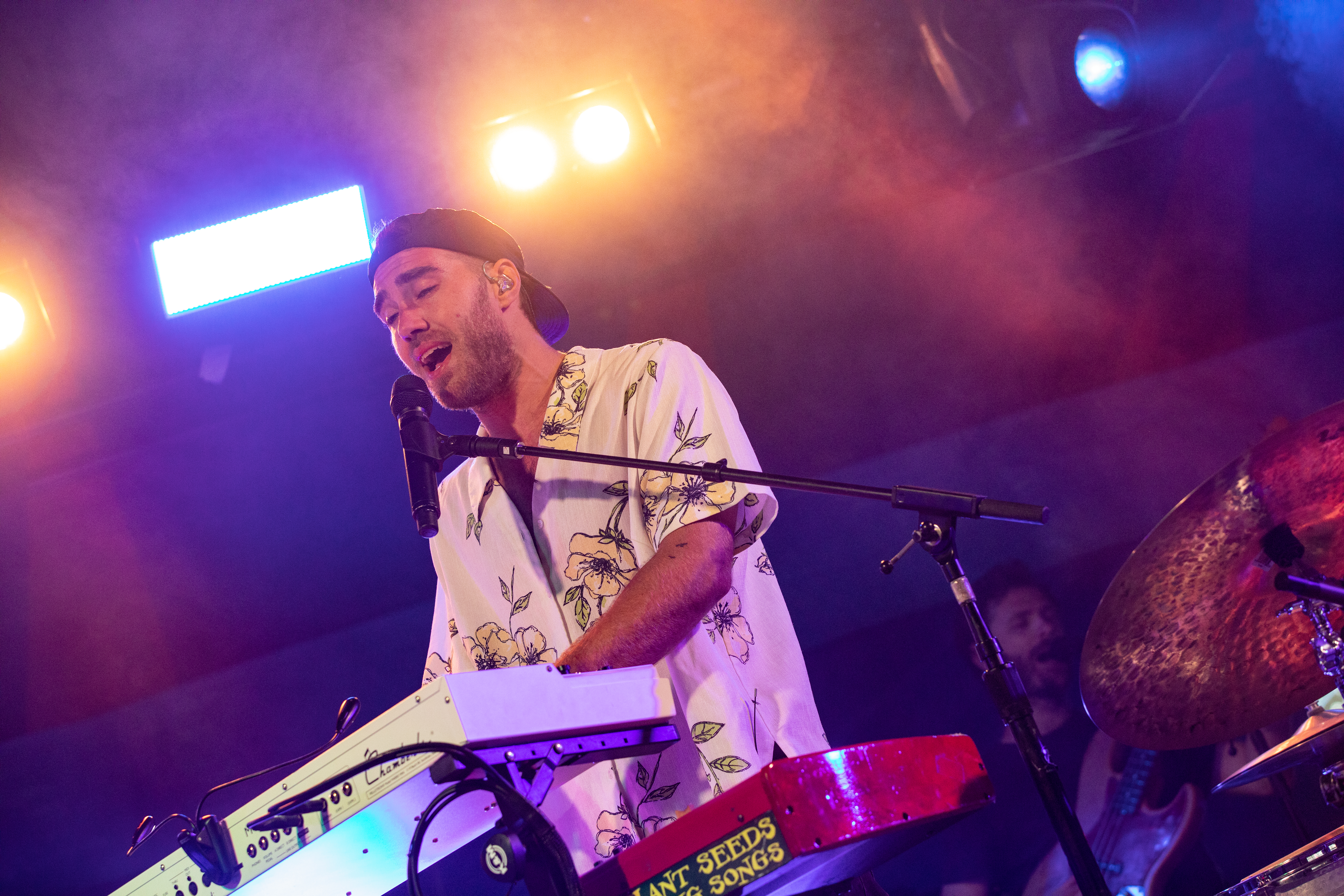
- Matt Corby at Williams Green Glastonbury Festival 2019
- Studio albums: 4
- EPs: 8
- Singles: 26

The discography of Australian singer-songwriter Matt Corby consists of four studio albums, eight extended plays and twenty-six singles.

== Studio albums ==
List of studio albums, with release date, label, selected chart positions, and certifications shown
Title	Album details	Peak chart positions				Certifications
Title	Album details	AUS	NL	NZ	UK	Certifications
Telluric	Released: 11 March 2016; Label: Universal Music Australia (4770067); Formats: CD, LP, digital download, streaming	1	66	4	36	ARIA: Gold; RMNZ: Platinum
Rainbow Valley	Released: 2 November 2018; Label: Island Records Australia (6795193); Formats: CD, LP, digital download, streaming	4	—	30	—	RMNZ: Gold
Everything's Fine	Released: 24 March 2023; Label: Island Records Australia; Formats: CD, LP, digital download, streaming	8	—	—	—	
Tragic Magic	Released: 17 April 2026; Label: Island Records Australia; Formats: CD, LP, digital download, streaming	3	—	31	—	

== Extended plays ==
List of extended plays, with selected chart positions and certifications, showing album details
Title	Details	Peak chart positions	Certifications
Title	Details	AUS	Certifications
Song for...	Released: 5 June 2009; Label: Scorpio Music (Scorp 111); Format: CD, digital download	—	
My False	Released: 2010; Label: Communion; Format: digital download	—	
Transition to Colour	Released: 19 October 2010; Label: Communion, Universal Music Australia (2752831); Format: CD, digital download	—	
Into the Flame	Released: 11 November 2011; Label: Universal Music Australia (2787028); Format: CD, digital download	3	ARIA: 10× Platinum
iTunes Session	Released: 7 December 2012; Label: Matt Corby (independent); Format: Digital download, streaming	19	
Resolution	Released: 12 July 2013; Label: Universal Music Australia (3753988); Format: CD, digital download	— (Note: Sales of the Resolution EP were later counted towards sales of the single)	
Live On the Resolution Tour	Released: 13 December 2013; Label: Universal Music Australia (3765628); Format: CD, digital download, 12"	48	
Live from Sydney ABC NYE 2025	Released: 6 February 2026; Label: ABC Music; Format: digital download	—	
"—" denotes a recording that did not chart or was not released in that territory.

== Singles ==
List of singles, with year released, selected chart positions, certifications, and album name shown
Title	Year	Peak chart positions				Certifications	Album
Title	Year	AUS	NL	NZ	UK	Certifications	Album
"Letters"	2009	—	—	—	—		Song for...
"Light Home"	2010	—	—	—	—		My False
"Made of Stone"	2010	—	—	—	—		Transition to Colour
"Brother"	2011	— (Note: In Australia, the Into the Flame EP appeared on the Australian Singles Chart. Sales of songs on the EP, including "Brother" went toward the sales tallies of Into the Flame EP and therefore could not chart individually.)	32	—	—	RMNZ: 2× Platinum	Into the Flame
"Resolution"	2013	5	—	16	150	ARIA: 7× Platinum; RMNZ: 3× Platinum	Resolution
"What the Devil Has Made"	2014	—	—	—	—		Spirit of Akasha
"Monday"	2015	45	—	—	—	ARIA: Gold; RMNZ: Gold	Telluric
"Sooth Lady Wine"	2015	93	—	—	—		Telluric
"Empires Attraction"	2016	—	—	—	—		Telluric
"No Ordinary Life"	2018	—	—	— (Note: "No Ordinary Life" did not enter the NZ Top 40 Singles Chart, but peaked at number 27 on the NZ Hot Singles Chart.)	—	ARIA: Gold	Rainbow Valley
"All Fired Up"	2018	—	—	—	—	ARIA: Gold; RMNZ: Gold	Rainbow Valley
"All That I See"	2018	—	—	—	—		Rainbow Valley
"Miracle Love"	2019	—	—	— (Note: "Miracle Love" did not enter the NZ Top 40 Singles Chart, but peaked at number 15 on the NZ Hot Singles Chart.)	—	ARIA: 3× Platinum; RMNZ: Platinum	Rainbow Valley
"Talk It Out" (with Tash Sultana)	2019	—	—	— (Note: "Talk It Out" did not enter the NZ Top 40 Singles Chart, but peaked at number 13 on the NZ Hot Singles Chart.)	—	ARIA: Platinum; RMNZ: Gold	Non-album singles
"So Easy" (with Triple One and Kwame)	2019	—	—	—	—	ARIA: Gold	Non-album singles
"If I Never Say a Word"	2020	—	—	—	—		Non-album singles
"Vitamin"	2020	—	—	—	—		Non-album singles
"Problems"	2022	—	—	—	—		Everything's Fine
"Reelin'"	2023	—	—	—	—		Everything's Fine
"Big Smoke"	2023	—	—	—	—		Everything's Fine
"Desert Land"	2023	—	—	—	—		Non-album single
"Same Page" (with Jillian Loux)	2024	—	—	—	—		Non-album single
"Bricks" (with Meg Mac)	2024	—	—	—	—		Non-album single
"Long and Short"	2025	—	—	—	—		Tragic Magic
"Burn it Down"	2025	—	—	—	—		Tragic Magic
"Big Ideas"	2025	—	—	—	—		Tragic Magic
"Know It All"	2025	—	—	—	—		Tragic Magic
"War to Love"	2026	—	—	—	—		Tragic Magic
"The Blade" (with Kingfishr)	2026	—	—	—	—		Non-album single
"Maker"	2026	—	—	— (Note: "Maker" did not enter the NZ Top 40 Singles Chart, but peaked at number 31 on the NZ Hot Singles Chart.)	—		Tragic Magic
"How to Breathe" (with the Rions)	2026	—	—	— (Note: "How to Breathe" did not enter the NZ Top 40 Singles Chart, but peaked at number 40 on the NZ Hot Singles Chart.)	—		Everything Every Single Day
"Dracula" (Like a Version)	2026	—	—	—	—		Non-album single
"Let Go" (with Peking Duk)	2026	—	—	—	—		Paradise
"—" denotes a recording that did not chart or was not released in that territory.

== Other charted songs ==
List of non-single chart appearances, with year released and album name shown
Title	Year	Peak chart positions		Album
Title	Year	AUS	NZ Hot	Album
"Lay You Down"	2013	73	—	Resolution – EP
"Light My Dart Up"	2018	—	40	Rainbow Valley
"For Real"	2023	—	30	Everything's Fine

== Other appearances ==
List of other non-single song appearances
Title	Year	Album
"This Morning" (with Missy Higgins)	2013	Crucible: The Songs of Hunters & Collectors
"Serious" (with Kygo)	2016	Cloud Nine
"The Way" (with Budjerah)	2023	Faraway Downs (Soundtrack)

== Music videos ==
Year	Title	Director
2009	"Letters"	Matt Hart
2010	"Lighthome" (Live at Studio 301)	—
2010	"Made of Stone"	Alex Roberts
2013	"Resolution"	Bryce Jepson
2015	"Monday"	Bryce Jepson
2016	"Empires Attraction"	Alex Katzki
2018	"No Ordinary Life"	VJ Ego
2019	"Miracle Love" (Live At Manchester Cathedral)	Raja Virdi
2019	"Take It Out" (with Tash Sultana)	Andrew Onorato
2020	"If I Never Say a Word"	Madeline Johnson
2022	"Problems"	Murli Dhir
2024	"Bricks"	
