= Great Gable (band) =

Australian indie rock band

- Origin: Bunbury, Western Australia, Australia
- Genres: Indie rock; alt rock; rock; reggae; blues
- Years active: 2014–present
- Labels: ADA Worldwide; Warner Music Australia
- Members: Alex Whiteman; Matt Preen; Chris Bye
- Past members: Brandon Richards; Callum Guy; Madi Hanley
- Website: www.greatgablemusic.com

Great Gable are an Australian indie rock band formed in Bunbury, Western Australia in 2014. The band consists of Alex Whiteman (lead vocals, guitar), Matt Preen (lead guitar) and Chris Bye (bass guitar). Brandon Richards previously performed as the band's bass guitarist until 2017 and Callum Guy as the drummer until his departure from the band in 2023.

Their 2020 singles, "All My Friends", "Blur" and "Tracing Faces" were added to rotation on national youth broadcaster Triple J. They released their debut album Tracing Faces on 7 August 2020, which peaked at number 78 on the ARIA Albums Chart.

Their musical style consists primarily of indie rock, rock and alternative rock, with occasional reggae and blues influences.

== Band members ==
Current members

- Alex Whiteman – lead vocals, rhythm guitar (2014–present)
- Matt Preen – lead guitar (2014–present)
- Chris Bye – bass guitar (2017–present)

Past members

- Madi Hanley - drums (2023-2025)
- Callum Guy - drums (2014-2023)
- Brandon Richards – bass guitar (2015–2017)

== Career ==
=== 2016–2018: Formation, GG, and Modern Interactions ===
Lead vocalist Alex Whiteman and lead guitarist Matt Preen became friends at the age of 12 or 13 whilst playing cricket competitively. In late 2014 in Bunbury, Western Australia, Preen and Whiteman decided to form a band, deciding to name it Great Gable. They had decided to form a band after "jamming" together. In mid-2015, Whiteman met drummer Callum Guy and bass guitarist Brandon Richards at the Western Australian Academy of Performing Arts (WAAPA), and asked the duo to join the band. Guy has since stated he thought "[Alex's] voice was awesome".

On 7 March 2016, Great Gable released their debut single, "Only for You", as the lead single from their debut extended play, GG. On 11 May, they released GG independently. All tracks were co-written by Preen, Whiteman, Guy and Richards. On 29 January 2017, they released "Early Morning" as the lead single from their second independent EP, Modern Interactions. On 31 August 2017, the band released Modern Interactions. Callum's friend, bass guitarist Chris Bye joined the band in late 2017.

On 25 July 2018, they released "Pillars", the lead single from their third EP, Lazy Bones Tapes. On 26 October, they released "Golden Slums", the second single from the EP. On 1 February 2019, they released "Cool Mind Blue", the third single from the EP. On 11 October 2019, they released "I Swear", the fourth and final single from the EP. Lazy Bones Tapes was released on 1 November 2019.

=== 2019–2020: Lazy Bones Tapes and debut album Tracing Faces ===
On 13 February 2020, Great Gable signed with ADA Worldwide. On 21 February, they released "All My Friends", the lead single from their debut album. On 15 May, they released the single "Blur", alongside the announcement of their debut album, titled Tracing Faces. On 26 June, they released "I Wonder", the third single from Tracing Faces.

Tracing Faces was released on 7 August, with the title track being released as the album's fourth and final single on the same day. Tracing Faces peaked at number 78 on the ARIA Albums Chart in the week following its release.

=== 2021–present: On the Wall in the Morning Light ===
On 9 September 2021, the band released the single "Hazy" and announced a 2022 Australian tour.

On 22 April 2022, Great Gable released "Dancing Shoes" and announced the forthcoming release of On the Wall in the Morning Light, scheduled for July 2022.

== Musical style and influences ==
Great Gable are primarily an indie rock, rock, alternative rock, reggae, and blues band. In 2015, then-bass guitarist Brandon Richards described the band as having "strong reggae and blues influences."

The band list Matt Corby (who produced their debut album Tracing Faces) as a defining influence, and cite his albums Telluric and Rainbow Valley as specific influences. They have also described their music as being inspired by Jeff Buckley, Sticky Fingers, and the Clash.

They consider the records Revolver by the Beatles, AM by Arctic Monkeys, Kinfolk by Nate Smith and IV by BadBadNotGood to be significant musical influences of theirs.

== Philanthropy ==
Great Gable have contributed to multiple social causes. Great Gable donated $1 of every ticket sale for their 2019 Australian tour towards solar initiative Future Energy Artists (FEAT. Artists). The band are also CanTeen Side of Stage ambassadors, an initiative which provides free tickets to shows for young people affected by cancer.

== Discography ==
=== Studio albums ===
List of studio albums, with release date, label, and selected chart positions shown
Title	Album details	Peak chart positions
Title	Album details	AUS
Tracing Faces	Released: 7 August 2020; Label: ADA Worldwide, Warner Music Australia; Formats: CD, LP, digital download, streaming	78
On the Wall in the Morning Light	Released: 8 July 2022; Label: Warner (RVRCD003); Formats: CD, LP, digital download, streaming	— (Note: On the Wall in the Morning Light did not enter the ARIA Albums Chart, but did peak at number six on the ARIA Vinyl Chart.)
Small Fry	Released: 11 October 2024; Label: Rainbow Valley Warner; Formats: CD, LP, digital download, streaming	66

=== Extended plays ===
List of EPs, with release date and label shown
Title	Details
GG	Released: 11 May 2016; Label: ADA, Warner Music Australia; Formats: LP (limited release of 150 copies), digital download, streaming
Modern Interactions	Released: 31 August 2017; Label: ADA, Warner Music Australia; Formats: LP (limited release of 100 copies), digital download, streaming
Lazy Bones Tapes	Released: 1 November 2019; Label: ADA, Warner Music Australia; Formats: LP (limited release of 100 copies), digital download, streaming
Read the Room	Released: 7 September 2023; Label: Great Gable, Warner Music Australia; Formats: digital download, streaming

=== Singles ===
List of singles, with year released and album shown
Title	Year	Album
"Only For You"	2016	GG
"Early Morning"	2017	Modern Interactions
"Pillars"	2018	Lazy Bones Tapes
"Golden Slums"	2018	Lazy Bones Tapes
"Cool Mind Blue"	2019	Lazy Bones Tapes
"I Swear"	2019	Lazy Bones Tapes
"All My Friends"	2020	Tracing Faces
"Blur"	2020	Tracing Faces
"I Wonder"	2020	Tracing Faces
"Tracing Faces"	2020	Tracing Faces
"Hazy"	2021	On the Wall in the Morning Light
"Another Day"	2021	On the Wall in the Morning Light
"Our Love"	2022	On the Wall in the Morning Light
"Dancing Shoes"	2022	On the Wall in the Morning Light
"Best Friend"	2024	Small Fry
"Think Again Mother Fucker"	2024	Small Fry
"Fine Wine"	2024	Small Fry
"You Shall Not Pass"	2024	Small Fry
"Home Town"	2024	Small Fry

== Awards and nominations ==
=== National Live Music Awards ===
The National Live Music Awards (NLMAs) commenced in 2016 to recognise contributions to the live music industry in Australia.

Year	Nominee / work	Award	Result	Ref.
2020	Themselves	West Australian Live Act of the Year	Nominated	

== Tours ==
Great Gable have performed at multiple festivals, including Groovin' The Moo, Falls Festival, SOTA Festival, On the House Festival and Outfield Festival. They have also supported Ocean Alley, the Jungle Giants, Thelma Plum, the Jezabels and Psychedelic Porn Crumpets on their respective national tours.

=== Headlining ===
- Pillars Tour (2018)
- Golden Slums Tour (2018)
- 2019 Australia & New Zealand Tour (2019)
- Tracing Faces Tour (2020 – delayed from April to October due to COVID-19 pandemic)
- 2022 Australian Tour

=== Supporting ===
- Psychedelic Porn Crumpets 2019 National Tour (2019)
- New Order 2025 Australian Tour First night Perth Arena
