= List of best-selling singles of the 2010s in Australia =

The highest-selling singles in Australia are ranked in the Australian Recording Industry Association singles chart, also known as the ARIA Charts, published by the Australian Recording Industry Association (ARIA). The data are compiled from a sample that includes music stores, music departments at electronics and department stores and Internet sales, in other words, both digital as well as CD sales.

In January 2020, the Australian Recording Industry Association released a chart with the highest selling singles of the previous decade, using data from all ARIA singles charts between 1 January 2010 and 31 December 2019. Ed Sheeran had the highest-selling single of the decade, "Shape of You", which was certified fourteen times platinum and spent fifteen non-consecutive weeks at number one in 2017. It was followed by "Somebody That I Used to Know" by Gotye featuring Kimbra, the highest-selling Australian single of the decade, which peaked at the top of the chart for eight weeks in 2011 and was certified eleven times platinum.

== Top 100 ==
Position	Song title	Artist	Artist Nationality	Year	Peak
1	"Shape of You"	Ed Sheeran	United Kingdom	2017	1
2	"Somebody That I Used to Know"	Gotye featuring Kimbra	Australia; Belgium; New Zealand	2011	1
3	"Uptown Funk"	Mark Ronson featuring Bruno Mars	United Kingdom; United States	2014	1
4	"Party Rock Anthem"	LMFAO featuring Lauren Bennett and GoonRock	United States; United Kingdom; United States	2011	1
5	"Happy"	Pharrell Williams	United States	2014	1
6	"Thinking Out Loud"	Ed Sheeran	United Kingdom	2014	1
7	"Roar"	Katy Perry	United States	2013	1
8	"Perfect"	Ed Sheeran	United Kingdom	2017	1
9	"Let Her Go"	Passenger	United Kingdom	2013	1
10	"Someone Like You"	Adele	United Kingdom	2011	1
11	"Wake Me Up"	Avicii	Sweden	2013	1
12	"Rolling In the Deep"	Adele	United Kingdom	2011	3
13	"Moves Like Jagger"	Maroon 5 featuring Christina Aguilera	United States	2011	2
14	"Riptide"	Vance Joy	Australia	2013	6
15	"Closer"	The Chainsmokers featuring Halsey	United States	2016	1
16	"Thrift Shop"	Macklemore & Ryan Lewis featuring Wanz	United States	2012	1
17	"Gangnam Style"	PSY	South Korea	2012	1
18	"Titanium"	David Guetta featuring Sia	France; Australia	2011	5
19	"Battle Scars"	Guy Sebastian featuring Lupe Fiasco	Australia; United States	2012	1
20	"Love the Way You Lie"	Eminem featuring Rihanna	United States; Barbados	2010	1
21	"All of Me"	John Legend	United States	2014	1
22	"Call Me Maybe"	Carly Rae Jepsen	Canada	2012	1
23	"Shake It Off"	Taylor Swift	United States	2014	1
24	"Sexy and I Know It"	LMFAO	United States	2011	1
25	"Firework"	Katy Perry	United States	2010	3
26	"Love Yourself"	Justin Bieber	Canada	2015	1
27	"Pumped Up Kicks"	Foster the People	United States	2011	1
28	"Hello"	Adele	United Kingdom	2015	1
29	"Despacito"	Luis Fonsi and Daddy Yankee featuring Justin Bieber	United States; Canada	2017	1
30	"Royals"	Lorde	New Zealand	2013	2
31	"Take Me To Church"	Hozier	Ireland	2015	2
32	"Counting Stars"	OneRepublic	United States	2013	2
33	"Can't Hold Us"	Macklemore & Ryan Lewis featuring Ray Dalton	United States	2013	1
34	"Rockstar"	Post Malone featuring 21 Savage	United States; United Kingdom	2017	1
35	"The A Team"	Ed Sheeran	United Kingdom	2011	2
36	"Blurred Lines"	Robin Thicke featuring T.I. and Pharrell Williams	United States	2013	1
37	"Youngblood"	5 Seconds of Summer	Australia	2018	1
38	"Say You Won't Let Go"	James Arthur	United Kingdom	2016	1
39	"One Dance"	Drake featuring Wizkid and Kyla	Canada; Nigeria; United Kingdom	2016	1
40	"Stay With Me"	Sam Smith	United Kingdom	2014	5
41	"Can't Stop the Feeling!"	Justin Timberlake	United States	2016	3
42	"Chandelier"	Sia	Australia	2014	2
43	"Castle on the Hill"	Ed Sheeran	United Kingdom	2017	2
44	"Hall of Fame"	The Script featuring Will.i.am	Ireland; United States	2012	4
45	"Sorry"	Justin Bieber	Canada	2015	2
46	"A Thousand Years"	Christina Perri	United States	2012	13
47	"Never Be like You"	Flume featuring Kai	Australia; Canada	2016	1
48	"We Found Love"	Rihanna featuring Calvin Harris	Barbados; United Kingdom	2011	2
49	"Don't You Worry Child"	Swedish House Mafia featuring John Martin	Sweden	2012	1
50	"Thunder"	Imagine Dragons	United States	2017	2
51	"Skinny Love"	Birdy	United Kingdom	2012	2
52	"I Fall Apart"	Post Malone	United States	2018	2
53	"HUMBLE."	Kendrick Lamar	United States	2017	2
54	"Starboy"	The Weeknd featuring Daft Punk	Canada; France	2016	2
55	"Radioactive"	Imagine Dragons	United States	2013	6
56	"Old Town Road"	Lil Nas X	United States	2019	1
57	"Hey, Soul Sister"	Train	United States	2010	1
58	"Eastside"	Benny Blanco, Halsey and Khalid	United States	2018	2
59	"Just Give Me a Reason"	Pink featuring Nate Ruess	United States	2013	1
60	"Lean On"	Major Lazer & DJ Snake feat. MØ	United States; France; Denmark	2015	1
61	"Sunflower"	Post Malone and Swae Lee	United States	2019	1
62	"All About That Bass"	Meghan Trainor	United States	2014	1
63	"Havana"	Camila Cabello featuring Young Thug	Cuba; United States; United States	2017	1
64	"Be Alright"	Dean Lewis	Australia	2018	1
65	"7 Years"	Lukas Graham	Denmark	2016	1
66	"Dancing On My Own"	Calum Scott	United Kingdom	2016	2
67	"Cheerleader" (Felix Jaehn Remix)	OMI	Jamaica; Germany	2015	1
68	"Brother"	Matt Corby	Australia	2012	3
69	"Paradise"	Coldplay	United Kingdom	2012	3
70	"The Monster"	Eminem featuring Rihanna	United States; Barbados	2013	1
71	"Something Just like This"	The Chainsmokers and Coldplay	United States; United Kingdom	2017	2
72	"Diamonds"	Rihanna	Barbados	2012	6
73	"Geronimo"	Sheppard	Australia	2014	1
74	"See You Again"	Wiz Khalifa feat. Charlie Puth	United States	2015	1
75	"Shotgun"	George Ezra	United Kingdom	2018	1
76	"Dance Monkey"	Tones and I	Australia	2019	1
77	"Shut Up and Dance"	Walk the Moon	United States	2015	3
78	"Wild Ones"	Flo Rida featuring Sia	United States; Australia	2012	1
79	"Dynamite"	Taio Cruz	United Kingdom	2010	1
80	"Whistle"	Flo Rida	United States	2012	1
81	"What Makes You Beautiful"	One Direction	United Kingdom; Ireland	2012	7
82	"What Do You Mean?"	Justin Bieber	Canada	2015	1
83	"Cheap Thrills"	Sia	Australia	2016	6
84	"Blank Space"	Taylor Swift	United States	2014	1
85	"Timber"	Pitbull featuring Kesha	United States	2013	4
86	"Just the Way You Are"	Bruno Mars	United States	2010	1
87	"Freaks"	Timmy Trumpet and Savage	Australia; New Zealand	2014	3
88	"Lose Yourself"	Eminem	United States	2002	1
89	"This Is What You Came For"	Calvin Harris featuring Rihanna	United Kingdom; Barbados	2016	1
90	"Get Lucky"	Daft Punk featuring Pharrell Williams	France; United States	2013	1
91	"Starships"	Nicki Minaj	United States	2012	2
92	"Meant to Be"	Bebe Rexha featuring Florida Georgia Line	United States	2018	2
93	"Locked Out of Heaven"	Bruno Mars	United States	2012	4
94	"Give Me Everything"	Pitbull featuring Ne-Yo, Afrojack and Nayer	United States; United States; Netherlands; United States	2011	2
95	"God's Plan"	Drake	Canada	2018	1
96	"Photograph"	Ed Sheeran	United Kingdom	2015	9
97	"Don't Let Me Down"	The Chainsmokers featuring Daya	United States	2016	3
98	"Stay"	Rihanna featuring Mikky Ekko	Barbados; United States	2013	4
99	"Shallow"	Lady Gaga and Bradley Cooper	United States	2019	1
100	"Cosby Sweater"	Hilltop Hoods	Australia	2014	4

== See also ==
- List of best-selling singles of the 2000s in Australia
