= Don't You See =

Don't You See may refer to:

- "Don't You See!" (Zard song), a 1997 song by Zard
- "Don't You See", a song by Great Gable from their 2020 album Tracing Faces
