= ITunes Session (Matt Corby EP) =

iTunes Session

EP by Matt Corby
- Released: 7 December 2012
- Recorded: 2012
- Studio: Studios 301, Sydney
- Label: Matt Corby

Matt Corby chronology
Into the Flame (2011)	iTunes Session (2012)	Resolution (2013)

iTunes Session is the fifth EP by Australian musician Matt Corby, released only in Australia and New Zealand on 7 December 2012. The EP was recorded in Studios 301 in Sydney before Corby headed to Europe.

The EP debuted and peaked at number 19 on the ARIA chart in December 2012.

== Track listing ==
No.	Title	Writer(s)	Length
1.	"Souls A'fire"	Matt Corby	4:03
2.	"Big Eyes"	Corby	5:18
3.	"Refuge"		4:28
4.	"Brother"	Corby	6:02
5.	"Letters"		3:58
6.	"Amazing Grace"	John Newton	4:23

== Charts ==
Chart (2012)	Peak position
Australia (ARIA)	19
