= Songs for Australia =

Compilation album by various artists
- Released: 5 March 2020
- Label: BMG Australia

Songs for Australia is a compilation album curated by Australian singer-songwriter Julia Stone to aid bushfire relief, consisting of covers of well-known Australian songs by other artists from around the world. The album was released on 5 March 2020 online and was made available in June 2020 in stores. Proceeds will go to Firesticks, Landcare Australia, SEED, Emergency Leaders for Climate Action, WildArk and the NSW Rural Fire Service.

== Track listing ==
No.	Title	Original Artist	Length
1.	"Never Tear Us Apart" (by the National)	INXS	3:18
2.	"Reckless" (by Laura Mvula)	Australian Crawl	4:48
3.	"Streets of Your Town" (by Dope Lemon)	The Go-Betweens	3:27
4.	"Chandelier" (by Damien Rice)	Sia	5:13
5.	"Hearts a Mess" (by Joan as Police Woman)	Gotye	5:05
6.	"Stranger Than Kindness" (by Kurt Vile)	Nick Cave and the Bad Seeds	4:11
7.	"Let Me Down Easy" (by Sam Amidon)	Gang of Youths	1:37
8.	"Resolution" (by Dermot Kennedy)	Matt Corby	3:38
9.	"Native Born" (by Paul Kelly)	Archie Roach	3:51
10.	"Ship Song" (by Martha Wainwright)	Nick Cave and the Bad Seeds	4:04
11.	"Chateau" (by Petit Biscuit)	Angus & Julia Stone	3:03
12.	"Into My Arms" (by Dan Sultan)	Nick Cave and the Bad Seeds	5:06
13.	"Big Jet Plane" (by Pomme)	Angus Stone (later Angus & Julia Stone)	3:54
14.	"Beds Are Burning" (by Julia Stone)	Midnight Oil	3:46
15.	"Down Under" (by Partyface)	Men at Work	5:31

== See also ==
- Artists Unite for Fire Fight
