= All My Fault =

All My Fault may refer to:

- "All My Fault", a song by Fenix TX from the 2001 album Lechuza
- "All My Fault", a song by Gable from the 2020 album Tracing Faces
- "All My Fault", a song by Angelina Jordan from the 2023 EP Old Enough
