= Problems (Matt Corby song) =

Single by Matt Corby

from the album Everything's Fine
- Released: 3 November 2022
- Studio: Rainbow Valley Studios
- Length: 3:32
- Label: Universal Music Australia
- Songwriters: Matt Corby; Chris Collins
- Producers: Matt Corby; Chris Collins; Nat Dunn

Matt Corby singles chronology
"Vitamin" (2020)	"Problems" (2022)	"Reelin'" (2023)

Music video
- "Problems" on YouTube

"Problems" is a song by Australian musician Matt Corby, released on 3 November 2022 as the lead single from his third studio album, Everything's Fine (2023).

== Background and release ==
"Problems" was written within a week of Corby and his family losing their home caused by the 2022 eastern Australia floods. His heavily pregnant partner had to be whisked to safety in a small dinghy.

Corby returned to the studio with renewed focus to rebuild and move forward with clarity. Lyrically, Corby explained "It's about how funny humans are creating our own problems and issues that we then have to solve. Or creating problems so difficult we then can't solve, and how people talk so much shit and don't do anything – how we're setting ourselves up for failure. People want to point the finger but nobody wants to carry anything themselves."

The song was first played on Triple J on 2 November 2023 and released the following day.

== Music video ==
The Murli Dhir directed music video was released on 22 November 2022. Dhir said "When I first heard 'Problems', I knew I wanted to make a bright and funny video that showed someone grooving completely oblivious to their problems around them".

A live at Rainbow Valley Studios version was released on 13 December 2022.

== Reception ==
Sose Fuamoli from Double J said "'Problems' demonstrates a refined sense of identity when it comes to Matt's hold on arrangement and individual style. Though this song feels decidedly different to 2018's Rainbow Valley album, 'Problems' still prominently has the stamp of being a Matt Corby joint."

Alex Gallagher from Music Feeds said "Building on the songwriter and producer's underlying R&B tendencies, it's layered with grooving bass, woozy electronics and in-the-pocket drums, foregrounding Corby's smooth croon."

Robin Murray from Clash Magazine said "'Problems' is – almost in spite of its title – a curiously laid back jammer, soaked in West Coast synths and soulful sense of pop song writing."

Conor Lochrie from Rolling Stone Australia noted the "bubbling R&B-influenced production [and] woozy keys and groovy bass skim". Ellie Robinson from NME called the song "silky and groove-laden".
