= Live on the Resolution Tour =

EP by Matt Corby
- Released: 13 December 2013
- Length: 34:04
- Label: Universal Music Australia

Matt Corby chronology
| Resolution (2013) | Live on the Resolution Tour (2013) | Telluric (2016) |

Live on the Resolution Tour is the sixth EP by Australian musician Matt Corby, released on 12 December 2013. The EP debuted and peaked at number 48 on the ARIA Albums Chart in December 2013.

== Track listing ==
| No. | Title | Writer(s) | Length |
|---|---|---|---|
| 1. | "Runaway" | Matt Corby, Joel Dowling | 6:24 |
| 2. | "Lay You Down"/"Song For" | Corby, Dominic Salole | 9:54 |
| 3. | "Resolution" | Corby, Salole | 5:39 |
| 4. | "Almost Cut My Hair" | David Crosby | 4:28 |
| 5. | "Trick of the Light" | Corby, Salole | 7:39 |
| Total length: | | | 34:04 |

== Charts ==
| Chart (2013) | Peak position |
|---|---|
| Australian Albums (ARIA) | 48 |
