= Harrison Storm =

Australian singer-songwriter

- Born: Melbourne, Victoria Australia
- Origin: Mornington Peninsula
- Genres: Country; folk
- Occupations: Singer; songwriter
- Years active: 2014–present
- Label: Nettwerk Music Group
- Website: www.harrisonstorm.com

Harrison Storm is an Australian country singer-songwriter. His debut studio album Wonder, Won't You was released in January 2024.

== Career ==
Storm began playing acoustic music on the Mornington Peninsula, but moved to Melbourne in 2014. There, he recorded music for his debut EP in friend Hayden Calnin's home studio. Calnin also produced the EP, which was self-titled. It was distributed in Melbourne malls.

In March 2015, Storm released his EP Sense of Home and its lead single "Be Yourself" which received airplay on a US radio station.

In early 2017, Storm signed with Nettwerk Music Group and released the EP Change It All in September 2017. This was followed by single and EP Falling Down in June and July 2019.

In October 2020, "Sense of Home" was certified gold in Canada. In December 2020, Storm released the EP Be Slow.

In January 2022, Storm released Under Dusk with Enna Blake.

In January 2024, Storm released his debut studio album, Wonder, Won't You. In late 2024, Storm received Australian gold certifications for the singles "Change It All" and "Be Slow".

In February 2025, Storm released "Call Me When You Get In", produced by Matt Corby.

== Discography ==
=== Albums ===
List of albums, with selected details
Title	Details
Wonder, Won't You	Released: January 2024; Label: Harrison Storm, Nettwerk; Format: digital download
Empty Garden	Released: 3 October 2025; Label: Harrison Storm, Nettwerk; Format: digital download

=== Extended plays ===
List of EPs, with selected details
Title	Details
Sense of Home	Released: March 2015; Label: Harrison Storm; Format: digital download
Change It All	Released: September 2017; Label: Harrison Storm, Nettwerk; Format: CD, digital download
Falling Down	Released: July 2019; Label: Harrison Storm, Nettwerk; Format: CD, digital download
Be Slow	Released: December 2020; Label: Harrison Storm, Nettwerk; Format: digital download
Under Dusk (with Enna Blake)	Released: January 2022; Label: Harrison Storm & Enna Blake, Nettwerk; Format: digital download

=== Certified singles ===
List of certified singles
Title	Year	Certifications	Album
"Sense of Home"	2015	MC: Gold	Sense of Home
"Change It All"	2017	ARIA: Gold	Change It All
"Be Slow"	2020	ARIA: Gold	Be Slow
