= All Fired Up (Matt Corby song) =

Single by Matt Corby

from the album Rainbow Valley
- Released: 7 September 2018
- Length: 4:30
- Label: Universal Music Australia
- Songwriters: Matt Corby, Dann Hume
- Producer: Dann Hume

Matt Corby singles chronology
"No Ordinary Love" (2018)	"All Fired Up" (2018)	"All That I See" (2018)

"All Fired Up" is a song by Australian musician Matt Corby, released on 7 September 2018, as the second single from his second studio album, Rainbow Valley. The song was certified gold in Australia in 2020.

== Music video ==
A live at Rainbow Valley Studios version was released on 7 September 2018.

== Reception ==
Thomas Bleach said "'All Fired Up' is a moody ballad that explores the inner struggles we sometimes suffer and that one person who can instantly make you feel better and safe from those thoughts. There is a true romantic and honest side to it which will have you reminiscing and reflecting on past and current relationships and people in your life."

JB Hi-Fi said "the bare-bones ballad talks of struggle from the outside, draping the stark, aching admission, 'when you break, I break”', over an understated piano arrangement."

== Certifications ==
Certifications for "All Fired Up"
Region	Certification	Certified units/sales
Australia (ARIA)	Gold	35,000^{‡}
New Zealand (RMNZ)	Gold	15,000^{‡}
^{‡} Sales+streaming figures based on certification alone.
