= Telluric (album) =

Studio album by Matt Corby
- Released: 11 March 2016
- Studios: Sing Sing, Melbourne; Berry Mountain Cottage
- Length: 45:17
- Labels: Mercury; Universal Music Australia; Atlantic; Elektra
- Producers: Dann Hume; Matt Corby

Matt Corby chronology
Live on the Resolution Tour (2013)	Telluric (2016)	Rainbow Valley (2018)

Singles from Telluric
- 1. "Monday" Released: 1 October 2015; 2. "Sooth Lady Wine" Released: 11 December 2025; 3. "Empires Attraction" Released: 16 September 2016

Telluric is the debut studio album by Australian singer-songwriter Matt Corby. The album was released on 11 March 2016. The album was announced in October 2015, alongside lead single, "Monday".

== Background ==
He originally wrote his debut album two years ago in Los Angeles, but disliked the results and scrapped it. His aim was to become self-sufficient in every aspect of the recording process and salvage his confidence, which had reached rock bottom. He wanted to know he was good enough to make his debut record. Corby explained; "I recorded an album two years ago that I didn't like. For a lot of reasons I wouldn't release it. It took me a year and a half to clear my head of everything that happened, accept my failures, reboot and have the balls to do it again."

On 1 October 2015, Corby released his first song in two years, "Monday" as the lead single from his debut album. The song reportedly took 10 minutes to record, and was laid down in a cottage in the NSW coastal town of Berry where he wrote and recorded most of the album. A lot of what ended up on Telluric – the gospel-tinged 'Monday', oozing '70s jams 'Sooth Lady Wine' and 'Knife Edge' – is the sound of Corby alone in Berry but spliced and merged with touches of his backing band from sessions recorded at Melbourne's Sing Sing Studios. "It might be the verse of one song will be entirely me – just bass, drums, guitar, maybe piano – and then the whole band breaks out in the chorus as a unified thing."

Corby added, "The idea that through nature and human activity we are all connected. It's the concept that runs through the record."

== Critical reception ==
Telluric has received positive reviews from critics. On Metacritic, the album has a score of 77 out of 100, based on four critics, indicating "generally favorable reviews".

Will Carroll, writing for Radsound, described Corby as a "unique and talented presence in modern music" and described the album as "an impressive debut" that is "warm, lush and so very listenable". In particular, he praised Corby's psycho-geographical approach to music.

Saby Reyes-Kulkarni from Paste Magazine gave the album an 8.9 rating and said: "Corby, Hume and the band (whose contributions here cannot be overstated) have come up with a fresh, resplendent take on soul music. Spiked with muted touches of rock and other intangibles, Telluric establishes Corby as far more than a genre stylist and even stamps him as a visionary to watch right out of the gate."

Gareth Hipwell from Rolling Stone Australia gave the album 3 stars and describes the album as "a fraught exercise in self-realisation" and "a cohesive effort."

Q Magazine gave a score of 80 out of 100 and said the album "is more Will Oldham than Will Young, with hints of Bon Iver, John Martyn and the Buckleys. The best of a beguiling bunch comes last."

Entertainment Weekly in its 12 February issue described the song "Sooth Lady Wine" as "Groovy '70s choogle from Down Under, served with an extra side of Steely Dan."

Mojo gave the album a score of 60 out of 100 and described the production as "dense, grainy and atmospheric, with Corby's layered vocals to the fore."

John Bell of The Line of Best Fit gave the album a rating of 8.5 and wrote, "His perfectionism has done him proud, as Telluric is a masterful glimpse into the mind of a man who has much to say, and who says it beautifully."

== Track listing ==
No.	Title	Writer(s)	Length
1.	"Belly Side Up"	Matt Corby; Dann Hume	4:05
2.	"Monday"	Corby; Hume	4:08
3.	"Knife Edge"	Corby; Hume	3:43
4.	"Oh Oh Oh"	Corby; Hume	3:49
5.	"Wrong Man"	Corby; Hume	4:14
6.	"Sooth Lady Wine"	Corby; Hume; John "Alex" Henriksson	4:36
7.	"Do You No Harm"	Corby; Hume	3:45
8.	"We Could Be Friends"	Corby; Hume	3:16
9.	"Why Dream"	Corby; Hume; Henriksson	3:28
10.	"Good to Be Alone"	Corby; Dominic "Mocky" Salole	5:01
11.	"Empires Attraction"	Corby; Hume; Henriksson	4:58

iTunes bonus tracks
No.	Title	Writer(s)	Length
12.	"Brother"	Corby	4:12
13.	"Resolution"	Corby; Salole	4:16

== Personnel ==
- Matt Corby – vocals, guitar, bass, keyboards, drums, recorder, percussion, production
- Jack Standen – keyboards, organ, clavinet
- Joel Dowling – guitar
- Michael Haydon – drums and percussion

Additional and technical personnel

- Dann Hume – producer, engineer
- Matthew Neighbour – engineer
- Eduardo De La Paz – mixing
- Stuart Hawkes – mastering at Metropolis Marstering, London

== Charts ==
=== Weekly charts ===
Chart (2016)	Peak position
Australian Albums (ARIA)	1
Belgian Albums (Ultratop Flanders)	61
Dutch Albums (Album Top 100)	66
New Zealand Albums (RMNZ)	4
Norwegian Albums (VG-lista)	33
UK Albums (Official Charts)	36

=== Year-end charts ===
Chart (2016)	Position
Australian Albums (ARIA)	36

== Certifications ==
Region	Certification	Certified units/sales
Australia (ARIA)	Gold	35,000^{^}
New Zealand (RMNZ)	Platinum	15,000^{‡}
^{^} Shipments figures based on certification alone.^{‡} Sales+streaming figures based on certification alone.

== See also ==
- List of number-one albums of 2016 (Australia)
