= Spirit of Akasha =

- Directed by: Andrew Kidman
- Release date: January 25, 2014
- Country: Australia
- Language: English

Spirit of Akasha is an Australian surfing film directed by Andrew Kidman with Executive Producers Chris Moss and Nicole Salisbury. Its soundtrack album was nominated for a 2014 ARIA Award for Best Original Soundtrack, Cast or Show Album.

== Film ==
Spirit of Akasha is a follow-up to Morning of the Earth, the classic Australian surfing film from 1972 directed by Albert Falzon and David Elfick. It was an attempt to "recapture the values and spirit that was represented in Morning of the Earth but this time also feature women surfing." It debuted at the Sydney Opera House on 25 January 2014.

It was filmed in 2012 and 2013 and the surfers featured include Sam Yoon, Mick Fanning, Stephanie Gilmore, Tom Curren, Kelly Slater, Ellis Ericson, Kye and Joel Fitzgerald, Heath Joske, and Harrison Roach.

Fred Pawle of The Australian gave it a mixed review, writing that it "has many beguiling moments that will entertain surfers and non-surfers alike, but it will never define its era as Morning of the Earth did." Bernard Zuel wrote in the Sydney Morning Herald that "it could make even the aquaphobe start considering what it would be like to be that deeply immersed in nature, all to a dreamscape soundtrack."

== Soundtrack ==
Samuel J. Fell writing in Rolling Stone gave it 4/5 stars calling it "an incredible soundtrack to a stellar film." The Sydney Morning Herald's Bernard Zuel praised the album writing "The beauty of the new soundtrack is how it gels with but also expands on the spirit of the original." Meredith McLean of the AU. Review gave it 9/10 saying "This project is a wonderful way to mirror a very overlooked part of our nation’s history."

== Track listing ==
1. To Be Young - Andrew Kidman And The Windy Hills
2. Drifting On A Daydream - Grouplove
3. I Just Knew - Andrew VanWyngarden
4. Starcrossed Lonely Sailor - Chris Robinson Brotherhood
5. What The Devil Has Made - Matt Corby
6. Wavves - Jack River
7. Before Your Very Eyes - Atoms For Peace
8. Akasha - Canyons Featuring Lee-Ann Curren
9. Spirit Of Akasha - Corsaire (Ben Howard, Mickey Smith, Nat Wason)
10. Great Divine - Xavier Rudd
1. Unchained - Tom Curren
2. Dancing Through The Air (part 1) - Brian Cadd & Tim Gaze
3. Gravity - Lee-Ann Curren
4. The Weatherman - Angus Stone
5. We Love Our Hole - Bonnie 'Prince' Billy & The Cairo Gang
6. In My Moondreams - Brian Wilson
7. The Pier - Dirty Three
8. Colouring The Streets - Pond
9. The Burren - Corsaire (Ben Howard, Mickey Smith, Nat Wason)
10. Old Mother Sea - Bill Bensing
11. Dancing Through The Air (reprise) - Brian Cadd & Tim Gaze
- "What the Devil Has Made" was released as a single in January 2014.
