= Tracing Faces =

Studio album by Great Gable
- Released: 7 August 2020
- Recorded: 2019–2020
- Studio: The Music Farm (Byron Bay, NSW)
- Genre: Psychedelia
- Length: 32:08
- Label: ADA Worldwide; Warner Music Australia
- Producer: Matt Corby (exec.); Alex Heriksson

Great Gable chronology
Lazy Bones Tapes (2019)	Tracing Faces (2020)

Singles from Tracing Faces
- 1. "All My Friends" Released: 21 February 2020; 2. "Blur" Released: 15 May 2020; 3. "I Wonder" Released: 26 June 2020; 4. "Tracing Faces" Released: 7 August 2020

Tracing Faces is the debut studio album by Australian indie rock band Great Gable, released on 7 August 2020 through ADA Worldwide and Warner Music Australia.

== Background ==
The album follows on less than a year after the release of their EP Lazy Bones Tapes (2019). In an interview with Triple J, lead vocalist Alex Whiteman elaborated on the decision to record an album as opposed to an EP:

"It took a little while to figure things out, which I think has been great for us. If we wrote the album or were getting hype any time sooner, it would've been too soon for us. We really needed to get around and gig, get better at writing songs. It's been really cool getting support behind us."

Matt Corby contacted Alex Henriksson (the band's co-producer) after hearing demos for the album, which led to Corby producing the record.

== Recording and composition ==
Tracing Faces was co-produced by Australian musician Matt Corby and Alex Heriksson. The album was written in a cabin in the Karri forests and a chestnut farm in southwest Australia, and recorded at The Music Farm near Byron Bay, New South Wales.

Of the recording process, bassist Chris Bye noted that "being engulfed in nature definitely influenced the overall vibe of what we came out with." Drummer Callum Guy additionally stated: "It was sick working with Alex Henriksson and Matt Corby on the album, they are full legends. They helped us to write better tunes and really inspired us."

=== Themes and influences ===
The album discusses themes of love, heartbreak and mental health. "Blur" has been described as containing Krautrock and neo-psychedelia influences.

== Release ==
Tracing Faces was announced on 14 May 2020, alongside the premiere of second single "Blur" on Triple J's Good Nights with Bridget Hustwaite.

Tracing Faces was released on 7 August 2020 through ADA Worldwide and Warner Music Australia, on CD, LP, digital download and streaming.

== Promotion ==
=== Singles ===
Tracing Faces was supported released by four singles: lead single "All My Friends", released on 21 February 2020, "Blur", released on 15 May 2020, "I Wonder", released on 26 June 2020, and the title track, released alongside the album on 7 August 2020.

=== Live performances ===
The band performed "Blur" live at Freo Social on 4 August 2020. Additionally, a national tour was announced alongside the album's announcement (see below).

== Critical reception ==
Professional ratings
Review scores
Source	Rating
Radio 13	4/5 stars
Milky	4/5 stars

Writing for NME Australia, journalist Alex Gallagher stated Tracing Faces "offers a fuller, more coherent picture of the captivating, sun-drenched guitar-pop they captured early on, richly textural while undeniably hooky and upbeat." He also wrote: "There's an earnestness to what Great Gable do that makes them difficult not to find charming, with singer Alex Whiteman's from-the-hip reflections on love, loss and mental health feeling like an authentic snapshot of a period in the band's lives."

David Boyle of Radio 13 praised the album as a "coming-of-age body of work" and stated [it] takes you on a journey that is magical and mystical with enough surprises even for the most seasoned traveller to enjoy." He additionally compared it favourably to Arctic Monkeys and the Beatles.

Milky described the album as "a continued exploration of the sound the band have been building upon" and "an incredible showcase of each members' musicianship and talent". They additionally favourably compared the title track to 1960's psychedelic music.

== Commercial performance ==
Tracing Faces debuted and peaked at number 78 on the ARIA Albums Chart for the chart dated 17 August 2020, before dropping out of the Top 100 the following week.

Tracing Faces additionally debuted and peaked at number 16 on the ARIA Top 20 Australian Albums Chart, and at number 4 on the ARIA Top 20 Vinyl Albums Chart.

== Track listing ==
All tracks are written by Alex Whiteman, Matt Preen, Chris Bye, Callum Guy, Matt Corby, and Alex Henriksson.

Tracing Faces track listing
No.	Title	Length
1.	"Tracing Faces"	3:32
2.	"Blur"	3:16
3.	"Deep End"	3:34
4.	"I Wonder"	3:07
5.	"No Other Way"	3:32
6.	"Coasting"	3:16
7.	"Don't You See"	3:05
8.	"All My Fault"	3:07
9.	"All My Friends"	4:42
10.	"Outro"	0:57
Total length:		32:08

== Personnel ==
Adapted from the album's liner notes.

=== Musicians ===
Great Gable

- Alex Whiteman – vocals, writing (1–10)
- Matt Preen – guitar, writing (1–10)
- Chris Bye – bass guitar, writing (1–10)
- Callum Guy – drums, writing (1–10)

Other musicians

- Matt Corby – writing (1–10)
- Alex Henriksson – writing (1–10)

=== Technical ===
- Alex Henriksson – production (1–10), mixing (9)
- Matt Corby – production (1–10)
- Matthew Neighbour – mixing (1–10)

== Tour ==
Tracing Faces Tour
- Tour by Great Gable
- Location: Oceania
- Associated album: Tracing Faces
- Start date: TBC
- End date: TBC
- Legs: 1 (as of October 2020)
- No. of shows: TBC

Great Gable announced a tour of Australia and New Zealand in support of the album in May 2020, alongside the release of second single "Blur". The tour was originally scheduled to begin in April 2020, before being rescheduled to October and November 2020 due to the COVID-19 pandemic, before being delayed indefinitely. The Australian leg of the tour will be performed in Brisbane, Perth, Melbourne, Sydney Adelaide, and Hobart, alongside regional dates in Byron Bay, Wollongong, Torquay and Maroochydore (which were announced following the delay of the tour). The New Zealand leg of the tour will be performed in Christchurch, Auckland and Wellington.

Perth producer Jamilla and Melbourne musician Velvet Bloom will feature as the support acts on the tour, with additional special guests yet to be announced.

== Charts ==
Chart performance for Tracing Faces
Chart (2020)	Peak position
Australian Albums (ARIA)	78
