= Tragic Magic (Matt Corby album) =

Studio album by Matt Corby
- Released: 17 April 2026
- Length: 46:53
- Label: Island Australia
- Producers: Chris Collins; Matt Corby; Dann Hume

Matt Corby chronology
Everything's Fine (2023)	Tragic Magic (2026)

Singles from Tragic Magic
- 1. "Long and Short" Released: 12 September 2025; 2. "Burn it Down" Released: 17 October 2025; 3. "Big Ideas" Released: 21 November 2025; 4. "Know It All" Released: 5 December 2025; 5. "War to Love" Released: 6 March 2026; 6. "Maker" Released: 17 April 2026

Tragic Magic is the fourth studio album by Australian singer Matt Corby, released on 17 April 2026 through Island Records Australia. The album was announced in October 2025 and was initially scheduled for release on 6 March 2026 before being delayed.

Upon announcement, Corby said "We've been working on it for about 18 months and I'm really proud of it. It feels very reflective of where my life is at right now; how my family, my kids are the most important thing and watching them grow up has completely rewired my brain and outlook on life."

The album was supported by an Australian tour in June 2026.

At the 2026 ARIA Music Awards it was nominated for Best Solo Artist, Best Adult Contemporary Album and Best Cover Art, winning Best Adult Contemporary Album.

== Reception ==
John Zebra from AAA Backstage called the album "a deeply introspective and sonically rich project" saying, "Tragic Magic explores the emotional spectrum between grief and joy, weaving together themes of fatherhood, friendship, loss and isolation. The album arrives as a timely and timeless body of work, reflecting Corby's evolving artistry while maintaining the soulful authenticity that has defined his career."

Grace Kneale from The AU Review said "The album carries many themes throughout it; themes of fatherhood, friendship, grief, isolation and joy. "

The Australian said Tragic Magic isn't an album that any artist with a penchant for 1970s-era production could craft; instead, it's the cumulative result of a lifetime spent respecting the musical process."

Lauren McNamara from Rolling Stone Australia said "Tragic Magic sees the Australian singer-songwriter further refine his timeless sound, balancing joy and hardship through rich bass-lines, delicate restraint and soaring falsetto, wrapped in his ever-evolving brand of sophisticated soul."

== Track listing ==
Tragic Magic track listing
No.	Title	Writer(s)	Producer(s)	Length
1.	"King of Denial"	Matt Corby; Chris Collins	Corby; Collins	3:49
2.	"Is it Healthy"	Corby; Nat Dunn	Corby; Collins	3:28
3.	"Big Ideas"	Corby; Dann Hume	Corby; Hume	2:39
4.	"Long and Short"	Corby; Shungudzo Kuyimba	Corby; Collins	3:33
5.	"Know It All"	Corby	Corby; Collins	6:25
6.	"Stained"	Corby; Collins	Corby; Collins	2:40
7.	"Burn It Down"	Corby; Collins; Megan McInerney	Corby; Collins; Stephen Mowat^{[s]}	3:33
8.	"Locked In"	Corby; Hume	Corby; Hume; Mowat^{[s]}	2:56
9.	"War to Love"	Corby; Hume	Corby; Hume; Mowat^{[s]}	3:46
10.	"Sad Eyes"	Corby; Dunn	Corby; Collins; Dunn^{[v]}	2:56
11.	"Maggie"	Corby; Collins; Dunn	Corby; Collins	3:07
12.	"Winning Ticket"	Corby; Collins	Corby; Collins	3:30
13.	"Maker"	Corby; Collins; Dunn	Corby; Collins; Mowat^{[s]}	4:31
Total length:				46:53

=== Notes ===
- ^{^[s]} indicates a strings producer
- ^{^[v]} indicats a vocal producer

== Personnel ==
Credits adapted from Tidal.

- Matt Corby – vocals, engineering (all tracks); drums (tracks 1–5, 7–13), percussion (1–3, 7–12), bass (1, 2, 4–8, 10–13), synthesizer (1, 2, 4–6, 8–12), guitar (1, 2, 8, 9, 12), piano (4, 5, 7, 10, 11, 13), Wurlitzer electric piano (6); Mellotron, string arrangement (7); organ (8, 12)
- George Georgiadis – mastering
- Chris Collins – mixing (1, 2, 4–6, 10–13), engineering (1, 4–7, 11–13), guitar (1, 7, 13), synthesizer (6, 7, 13), acoustic guitar (6); bass, string arrangement (7)
- Nat Dunn – background vocals (1, 2, 7, 10–12)
- Dane Laboyrie – horn (1, 2, 8)
- Dann Hume – engineering, mixing (3, 8, 9); guitar (3, 9), bass (9)
- Sam Boon – string arrangement (7–9, 13)
- Anna Pokorny – cello (7–9, 13)
- Adrian Biemmi – violin (7–9, 13)
- Cameron Jamieson – violin (7–9, 13)
- James Armstrong – violin (7–9, 13)
- Madeleine Jevons – violin (7–9, 13)
- Henry Justo – viola (7–9, 13)
- Stephen Mowat – engineering (7–9, 13)
- Meg Mac – background vocals (7)

== Charts ==
Chart performance for Tragic Magic
Chart (2026)	Peak position
Australian Albums (ARIA)	3
New Zealand Albums (RMNZ)	31
