= Monday (Matt Corby song) =

Single by Matt Corby

from the album Telluric
- Released: 1 October 2015
- Genre: Neo soul
- Label: Universal Australia
- Songwriters: Matt Corby; Dann Hume
- Producers: Matt Corby; Dann Hume

Matt Corby singles chronology
"What the Devil Has Made" (2014)	"Monday" (2015)	"Sooth Lady Wine" (2015)

Music video
- "Monday" on YouTube

"Monday" is a song by Australian singer Matt Corby, released in October 2015 as the lead single from Corby's debut studio album, Telluric. The song peaked at number 48 on the ARIA Singles Chart and was certified gold by the Australian Recording Industry Association in 2019.

"Monday" was voted number 53 in the Triple J Hottest 100, 2015.

== Reception ==
Aidan Hogg from The AU Review said "'Monday' screams Jeff Buckley influences and we're definitely not complaining about that; layered vocals and simple percussion create an atmospheric space for Corby's falsetto to sit perfectly over."

Hannah Marie from Atwood Magazine said "The hauntingly pure harmonic vocals Corby lays down at the beginning of the track signify the start of something special. From the first rustic, but oddly authentic click of the fingers, Corby has the listener hooked, and he continues to lay down a harmonic backing that seems to channel its roots within music from the Renaissance. Corby remains faithful to his signature sound, characterised by his convincing falsetto enriched with vibrato: It creates an immaculate tone that is difficult to ignore."

== Charts ==
Chart (2015)	Peak position
Australia (ARIA)	48

== Certifications ==
Region	Certification	Certified units/sales
Australia (ARIA)	Gold	35,000^{‡}
New Zealand (RMNZ)	Gold	15,000^{‡}
^{‡} Sales+streaming figures based on certification alone.
