= Miracle Love =

- Live single cover

Single by Matt Corby

from the album Rainbow Valley
- Released: December 2019
- Length: 3:49
- Label: Universal Music Australia
- Songwriters: Matt Corby, Dann Hume
- Producers: Dann Hume, Matt Corby

Matt Corby singles chronology
"All That I See" (2018)	"Miracle Love" (2019)	"Talk It Out" (2019)

Music video
- "Miracle Love (Live At Manchester Cathedral)" on YouTube

"Miracle Love" is a song by Australian musician Matt Corby, released in February 2019 as the fourth and final single from his second studio album, Rainbow Valley. A live version was released on 8 March 2019.

In a discussion with ABC, Corby said he originally didn't like the song, believing it was "too basic" before reworking it. He said is particularly proud of the drums in this song.

In December 2019, the song won first place in the Vanda & Young Global Songwriting Competition.

At the APRA Music Awards of 2020, the song was nominated for Most Performed Alternate Work of the Year.

== Music video ==
The live music video was released on 26 February 2019.

== Reception ==
Mixdown Mag said "'Miracle Love' sees the Australian musical extraordinaire channel his inner D'Angelo on the soulful track. Packed with dense vocal harmonies and staggered neo-soul grooves, 'Miracle Love' goes the distance to exemplify Corby's insane talent as a songwriter and performer."

== Charts ==
Chart (2018)	Peak position
New Zealand Hot Singles (RMNZ)	15

== Certifications ==
Region	Certification	Certified units/sales
Australia (ARIA)	3× Platinum	210,000^{‡}
New Zealand (RMNZ)	Platinum	30,000^{‡}
^{‡} Sales+streaming figures based on certification alone.
