= Reelin' =

Single by Matt Corby

from the album Everything's Fine
- Released: 12 January 2022
- Studio: Rainbow Valley Studios
- Length: 3:28
- Label: Universal Music Australia
- Songwriters: Matt Corby; Chris Collins; Nat Dunn
- Producers: Matt Corby; Chris Collins; Nat Dunn

Matt Corby singles chronology
"Problems" (2022)	"Reelin'" (2022)	"Big Smoke" (2023)

"Reelin'" is a song by Australian musician Matt Corby, announced on 10 January 2023 and released two days later as the second single from his third studio album, Everything's Fine.

In an interview with Atwood Magazine, Corby said "Reelin'" was one of the first songs written with Chris Collins and Nat Dunn. "Nat is an incredible writer. She co-wrote most of the record with me and Chris [Collins]. She has a way of listening to what I'm feeling and trying to say and just delivering these killer lines. So frequently I was blown away by her insight and ability to know what I was saying. I love working with her. The song itself is a simple one. It's a super important song for me on this record. Just me, Nat and Chris in a room. Simple and understated."

At the APRA Music Awards of 2024, the song was shortlisted for Song of the Year.

== Music video ==
A Niqui Toldi illustrated lyric video, directed by Brae Fisher was released on 12 January 2023.

A live at Rainbow Valley Studios version was released on 31 January 2023.

== Reception ==
Michael Major from BroadwayWorld said "Propelled by warm horns and light percussion, Matt reflects on the cornerstone of every successful commitment: communication and compromise. The song's sentiments like 'settle in for the healing' are indicative of his latest settled-down life phase, and continue to see his voice captivate the world over."

Al Newstead from Triple J called "Reelin'" "a soulful, unhurried jam that goes down smoothly thanks to Corby's buttery vocals and some deft brass."

Conor Lochrie from Rolling Stone Australia called the song "an honest consideration of the fraught dynamics of long-term romantic relationships. Propelled by hopeful horns and tender percussion, Corby's distinctive vocals soar as he discusses the importance of communication and compromise when dealing with a loved one."

Wonderland Magazine said "Reelin'" is "a song that epitomises the soul, charisma and artistic nuance of Matt (and) it's a track that allows Matt to open up on his romantic life, richly reflecting on the joys of love and commitment atop the warm and soulful instrumental."

Mitch Mosk from Atwood Magazine said "Simple, understated, and utterly intoxicating, 'Reelin' pulls us deep into the throes of Corby's moody mind. Its fire is soft, but even the softest fire burns – and without a doubt, I'll be taking this song, and its healthy punch of emotions, with me as the year gets underway."
