= Transition to Colour =

EP by Matt Corby
- Released: October 2010
- Recorded: 2010
- Studios: 2kHz Studios, London, Dragonfly Studios, Melbourne
- Labels: Communion Music , Universal Music Australia
- Producers: Ian Grimble, Dann Hume

Matt Corby chronology
| My False (2010) | Transition to Colour (2010) | Into the Flame (2011) |

Singles from Transition to Colour
- 1. "Made of Stone" Released: 2010

Transition to Colour is the third EP by Australian musician Matt Corby. It was recorded in London released by Communion Music and Universal Music Australia in October 2010.

== Critical reception ==
Beat Magazine said "A hypnotic collection of glimmering indie folk tunes, the EP is a surprisingly mature work from the 19-year-old singer-songwriter... Pianos trickle and swell throughout the record, strings hum and acoustic guitars pick their way through the songs, with the quiet skitter of drums driving everything forward. Corby's voice is beautiful, swinging easily from warm, whispering lows to brief, wailing highs." They concluded the review saying "His sound won't appeal to everyone – the soulful folk and lush production values are unselfconscious and devoid of irony, and completely outside of contemporary music trends. But Corby's EP is brave and confident, and the music is inarguably refined".

Oh No They Didn't said "Despite Transition to Colour being Corby's third EP, it still feels like a 'young' release. Too often he throws his voice at a song, showcasing his impressive range but adding little to the song's development. Yet when Corby shows a touch more restraint, such as on single 'Made of Stone', the smoke and red wine soaked 'Kings, Queens, Beggars and Thieves' and folky 'Refuge', the results exhibit a richness that defy his age."

== Track listing ==
| No. | Title | Length |
|---|---|---|
| 1. | "Coloured Stones and Walls" | 4:28 |
| 2. | "Made of Stone" | 3:14 |
| 3. | "Breathe" | 4:31 |
| 4. | "Winter" | 3:40 |
| 5. | "Kings, Queens, Beggars and Thieves" | 6:42 |
| 6. | "Refuge" (acoustic version) | 3:36 |
