= Resolution (EP) =

EP by Matt Corby
- Released: 12 July 2013
- Length: 20:32
- Label: Universal Music Australia
- Producer: Charlie Andrew; Mocky

Matt Corby chronology
iTunes Session (2012)	Resolution (2013)	Live on the Resolution Tour (2013)

Singles from Resolution
- 1. "Resolution" Released: 23 May 2013

Resolution is the sixth EP by Australian musician Matt Corby, released on 12 July 2013 by Universal Music Australia.

Sales of the EP counted towards the single, which peaked at number 5 on the ARIA Charts.

== Critical reception ==
Donald Gibson from Write on Music said the EP "commands attention and deserves an audience. Singing with extraordinary range and resilience, Corby steers between moments of serene, often melancholic introspection and ones of urgent, primal anguish." Gibson called out "Evangelist" as the "most invigorating song of the bunch".

== Track listing ==
No.	Title	Writer(s)	Length
1.	"Resolution"	Matt Corby, Dominic Salole	4:16
2.	"Lay You Down"	Corby, Salole	4:26
3.	"Evangelist"	Corby	8:22
4.	"Resolution" (demo)	Corby, Salole	3:28
Total length:			20:32
