= Everything's Fine (Matt Corby album) =

Studio album by Matt Corby
- Released: 24 March 2023
- Length: 40:19
- Label: Island Australia
- Producers: Matt Corby; Chris Collins; Alex Henriksson

Matt Corby chronology
Rainbow Valley (2018)	Everything's Fine (2023)	Tragic Magic (2026)

Singles from Everything's Fine
- 1. "Problems" Released: 4 November 2022; 2. "Reelin'" Released: 13 January 2023; 3. "Big Smoke" Released: 15 February 2023

Everything's Fine is the third studio album by Australian singer Matt Corby, released on 24 March 2023 through Island Records Australia. The album was announced on 11 January 2023, alongside second single, "Reelin'".

In a press statement Corby said the album's title was "not ironic, but intended to represent acceptance". On 15 February 2023, Corby released the album's third single "Big Smoke" and announced Everything's Fine tour dates, commencing in Melbourne on 22 May 2023.

The album's artwork was created by illustrator Niqui Toldi.

At the 2023 ARIA Music Awards, the album was nominated for Album of the Year, Best Produced Release and Best Engineered Release.

At the 2023 J Awards, the album was nominated for Australian Album of the Year.

== Reception ==
Professional ratings
Review scores
Source	Rating
American Songwriter	4/5 stars
Rolling Stone Australia	4/5 stars

Jade Kennedy from Rolling Stone Australia called the album a "triumph" saying "Corby's soulful vocals bring everything together with finesse. The auditory equivalent to hot cocoa: satisfying and sweet."

Alli Patton from American Songwriter felt that "Overall, Everything's Fine is more than just fine. The album is a groovy, spacey, soul-stirring message of hope where dreamy, drifting vocals meet easy, inoffensive sounds. It's a passionate, but also a perceptive record, one that understands and lets listeners know it will all be okay."

Michael Major from BroadwayWorld called it "Corby's most innovative, sonically adventurous and resonant album yet." Beat Magazine called the album "an absolute swoonfest".

== Track listing ==
Everything's Fine track listing
No.	Title	Writer(s)	Producer(s)	Length
1.	"Problems"	Matt Corby; Chris Collins	Corby; Collins; Nat Dunn^{[v]}	3:32
2.	"For Real"	Corby; Nat Dunn; Alex Henriksson	Corby; Henriksson; Dunn^{[v]}	4:02
3.	"Carry On"	Corby; Dunn; Collins	Corby; Collins	3:52
4.	"Reelin'"	Corby; Dunn; Collins	Corby; Collins; Dunn^{[p]}	3:28
5.	"Big Smoke"	Corby; Dunn; Collins	Corby; Collins; Dunn^{[v]}	3:38
6.	"Lover"	Corby; Dunn; Collins	Corby; Collins; Dunn^{[v]}	3:23
7.	"Reruns"	Corby; Dunn	Corby; Collins	3:16
8.	"Words I Say"	Corby; Dunn; Collins	Corby; Collins; Dunn^{[v]}	2:46
9.	"Mainies"	Corby; Dunn; Collins	Corby; Collins	4:12
10.	"Better Than That"	Corby; Dunn; Henriksson	Corby; Henriksson	3:41
11.	"Everything's Fine"	Corby; Collins; Dunn	Corby; Collins; Dunn^{[v]}	4:29
Total length:				40:19

=== Notes ===
- ^{^[p]} indicates a primary and vocal producer.
- ^{^[v]} indicates a vocal producer.

== Personnel ==
Credits adapted from the album's liner notes.

- Matt Corby – drums, bass, keyboards, piano, vocals (all tracks); programming (tracks 2, 10)
- Chris Collins – guitar (1, 3–6, 8, 11), keyboards (1, 3, 5, 6, 9, 11), programming (1, 9), bass (4, 11), violin (5, 11)
- Dane Laboyrie – trumpet, flugelhorn (4, 6, 8)
- Alex Henriksson – programming (2, 10)
- Dann Hume – mixing
- George Georgiadis – mastering
- Jeremy Hancock – creative direction, art direction
- Niqui Toldi – illustration

== Charts ==
Chart performance for Everything's Fine
Chart (2023)	Peak position
Australian Albums (ARIA)	8
