= Resolution (Matt Corby song) =

2013 single by Matt Corby

Single by Matt Corby

from the album Resolution
- Released: 23 May 2013
- Length: 4:16
- Label: Universal Australia
- Songwriters: Matt Corby, Dominic Salole
- Producers: Charlie Andrew; Mocky

Matt Corby singles chronology
"Brother" (2011)	"Resolution" (2013)	"What the Devil Has Made" (2014)

Music video
- "Resolution" on YouTube

"Resolution" is a song by Australian singer Matt Corby, released in May 2013 as the lead and only single from the EP of the same name. The song was released on 23 May 2013 by Universal Music Australia. "Resolution" peaked at number 5 on the ARIA Singles Chart and was certified 7× Platinum by the Australian Recording Industry Association for selling 490,000 equivalent units.

At the ARIA Music Awards of 2013, the song won Song of the Year. The Bryce Jepson directed music video was nominated for Best Video.

The song was also included as an iTunes bonus track on his debut album, Telluric (2016).

== Background ==
Corby wrote the song while he was living in Los Angeles. He said, "I got a little paranoid and I didn't really leave the house for a couple of days. I couldn't understand why I was so afraid of the world at this time so I wrote 'Resolution'. It's an ode to humanity and the way I want to be with other people and spread some love in an un-cheesy way."

"Resolution" (2013)

== Charts ==
=== Weekly charts ===
Chart (2013)	Peak position
Australia (ARIA)	5
New Zealand (Recorded Music NZ)	16
UK Singles (Official Charts Company)	150

=== Year-end charts ===
Chart (2013)	Position
Australia (ARIA)	39

== Certifications ==
Region	Certification	Certified units/sales
Australia (ARIA)	7× Platinum	490,000^{‡}
New Zealand (RMNZ)	3× Platinum	90,000^{‡}
^{‡} Sales+streaming figures based on certification alone.

== Dermot Kennedy version ==
"Resolution"

Single by Dermot Kennedy

from the album Songs for Australia
- Released: 4 March 2020
- Length: 3:38
- Label: Riggins; Interscope; Island

Dermot Kennedy singles chronology
"Outnumbered" (2019)	"Resolution" (2020)	"Giants" (2020)

Irish singer Dermot Kennedy released a cover version of the song as a single on 4 March 2020. The song features on compilation album Songs for Australia.

=== Background ===
The album, Songs for Australia was curated by Australian singer-songwriter Julia Stone to aid bushfire relief, consisting of covers of well-known Australian songs by other artists. Proceeds will go to Firesticks, Landcare Australia, SEED, Emergency Leaders for Climate Action, WildArk and the NSW Rural Fire Service. In a press statement, Stone said that 'Songs For Australia' initially stemmed from a one-off recording session, but the singer ended up curating the entire project by asking fellow musicians with to contribute, "I couldn't believe the responses I was getting. I received the most heart-warming replies from the biggest, busiest artists in the world. Most of these artists have toured here, have family here, friends here, have lived here or spent time here. Everyone has such great memories of this country and to see it in flames was breaking everyone's hearts."
