= Into the Flame =

EP by Matt Corby
- Released: 11 November 2011
- Label: Universal Music Australia

Matt Corby chronology
Transition to Colour (2010)	Into the Flame (2011)	iTunes Session (2013)

Singles from Into the Flame
- 1. "Brother" Released: 11 November 2011

Into the Flame is the fourth EP by Australian musician Matt Corby, released on 11 November 2011 by Universal Music Australia. It peaked at number 3 on the ARIA Charts and spent a total of 51 weeks in the chart.

== Critical reception ==
Hannah Spencer from Contactmusic.com said, "despite [the EP's] lush calmness, [it] lacks anything distinctly memorable, merely dusted with meandering melodies, but with every subsequent listen it grows and grows - a real tease." Scott Williams from Beat magazine called the album "a breath of fresh air in the Australian music industry." Hugh from Indie Shuffle wrote, "Into the Flame highlights his growth as an artist, with four beautifully assembled tracks."

== Track listing ==
All songs written by Matt Corby and produced by Tim Carr.

No.	Title	Length
1.	"Brother"	4:14
2.	"Souls A'fire"	4:17
3.	"Untitled"	5:11
4.	"Big Eyes"	4:42

== Credits and personnel ==
Credits adapted from the liner notes of Into the Flame.

- Matt Corby – vocals, guitar, artwork, writer
- Tim Carr – producer, mixer
- Simon Todkill – engineer
- Andrew Edgson – mastering
- Tim Coghill – drums
- Bree Tranter – keyboard, background vocals, guest vocals on "Big Eyes"
- Tristan Thorne – bass
- Nathan Johnson – art direction, illustrations

== Charts ==
Chart (2011–12)	Peak position
Australia (ARIA)	3

== Certifications ==
Region	Certification	Certified units/sales
Australia (ARIA)	10× Platinum	700,000^{‡}
^{‡} Sales+streaming figures based on certification alone.

== See also ==
- List of highest-certified singles in Australia
