= Rainbow Valley (album) =

Studio album by Matt Corby
- Released: 2 November 2018
- Studios: Music Farm, Byron Bay
- Length: 41:42
- Label: Universal Music Australia
- Producers: Dann Hume; Matt Corby; Matthew Neighbour

Matt Corby chronology
Telluric (2016)	Rainbow Valley (2018)	Everything's Fine (2023)

Singles from Rainbow Valley
- 1. "No Ordinary Life" Released: August 2018; 2. "All Fired Up" Released: 7 September 2018; 3. "All That I See" Released: 10 October 2018; 4. "Miracle Love" Released: February 2019

Rainbow Valley is the second studio album by Australian singer Matt Corby. It was released on 2 November 2018 through Universal Music Australia.

At the ARIA Music Awards of 2019, the album was nominated for three awards; Best Male Artist, Best Soul/R&B Release while Dann Hume won Producer of the Year for this release.

At the J Awards of 2019, the album won Australian Album of the Year.

== Background ==
Corby spent time travelling and experimenting with a friend Alex Henriksson, with the ideas they created becoming the basis for Rainbow Valley.

Following the August 2018 release of "No Ordinary Life", Corby released the single "All Fired Up" and announced the release of Rainbow Valley. "All That I See" was released as the album's third single in October 2018.

Corby plays all instruments and sings all vocals on the record.

== Track listing ==
No.	Title	Writer(s)	Length
1.	"Light My Dart Up"	Matt Corby	3:59
2.	"No Ordinary Life"	Corby, Dann Hume	3:58
3.	"All That I See"	Corby, Hume	3:46
4.	"Get with the Times"	Corby, John Alexander Henriksson	3:14
5.	"All Fired Up"	Corby, Hume	4:30
6.	"How It Ends"	Corby, Hume	0:38
7.	"New Day Coming"	Corby, Hume	4:35
8.	"Better"	Corby, Hume	4:00
9.	"Miracle Love"	Corby, Hume	4:22
10.	"Elements"	Corby, Hume	4:51
11.	"Rainbow Valley"	Corby, Henriksson	3:49
Total length:			41:42

== Personnel ==
Credits adapted from the album's liner notes and AllMusic.com.

- Matt Corby – composer, drums, keyboards, piano, primary artist, strings, synthesizer, vocals, backing vocals
- Dann Hume – composer, mixing, producer, recording
- Matthew Neighbour – engineer, co-producer, recording
- Andrei Eremin – mastering

== Charts ==
Chart (2018)	Peak position
Australian Albums (ARIA)	4
New Zealand Albums (RMNZ)	30

=== Year-end charts ===
Chart (2019)	Position
Australian Artist Albums (ARIA)	38

== Certifications ==
Region	Certification	Certified units/sales
New Zealand (RMNZ)	Gold	7,500^{‡}
^{‡} Sales+streaming figures based on certification alone.
