= Brother (Matt Corby song) =

Single by Matt Corby

from the album Into the Flame
- Released: 11 November 2011
- Genre: Soul; blues; Pop rock
- Length: 4:14
- Label: Universal Australia
- Songwriter: Matt Corby

Matt Corby singles chronology
| "Made of Stone" (2010) | "Brother" (2011) | "Resolution" (2013) |

"Brother" is the first single released from Australian singer Matt Corby's extended play (EP), Into the Flame. The song peaked at number 3 on the ARIA Charts as the Into the Flame EP, as songs' sales are counted towards their parent EPs on the singles chart. The song won Song of the Year at the 2012 ARIA Awards and was nominated for the same category at the 2012 APRA Awards. Brother came in at #3 in the Triple J Hottest 100, 2011, behind "Somebody That I Used to Know" and "Lonely Boy" and placed 51 in the Triple J Hottest 100 of Australian Songs in 2025.

"Brother" (2011)

== Charts ==
| Chart (2011–12) | Peak position |
|---|---|
| Australia (ARIA); Into the Flame EP | 3 |
| Netherlands (Dutch Top 40) | 29 |
| Netherlands (Single Top 100) | 32 |

=== Decade-end charts ===
| Chart (2010–2019) | Position |
|---|---|
| Australia (ARIA) | 68 |
| Australian Artist Singles (ARIA) | 8 |

== Certifications ==
| Region | Certification | Certified units/sales |
|---|---|---|
| New Zealand (RMNZ) | 2× Platinum | 60,000^{‡} |
^{‡} Sales+streaming figures based on certification alone.

== Other versions ==
Thundamentals performed a version of "Brother" on triple j's Like a Version in 2012.

Austin P. McKenzie performed a version of "Brother" on 30 August 2015, live at the Spring Awakening Cabaret.
