= Matt Corby =

Australian singer-songwriter (born 1990)

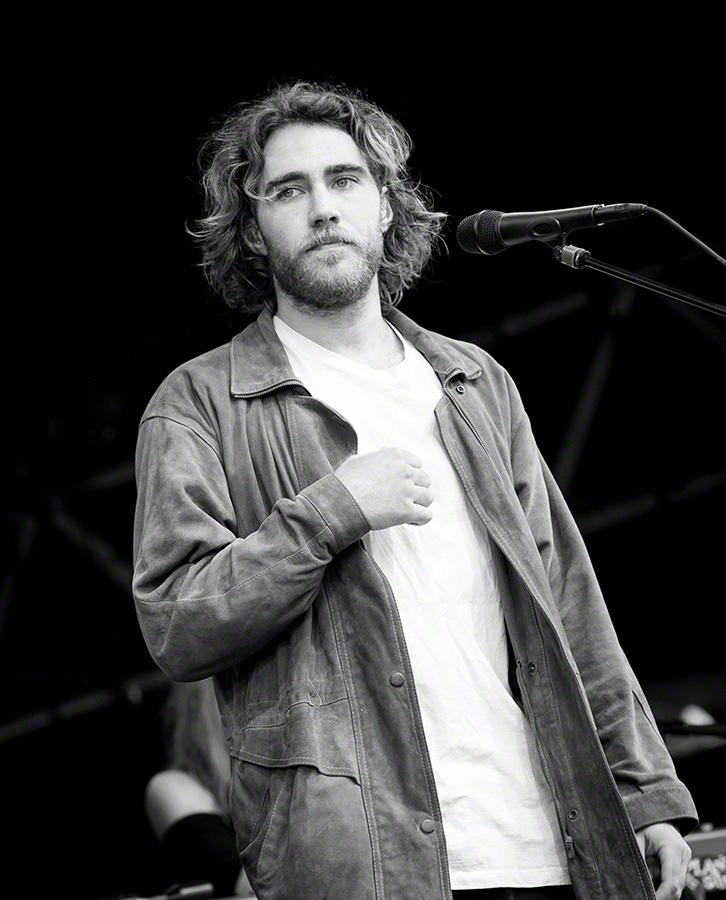
- Corby performing in Oslo in 2016

Background information
- Born: Matthew John Corby; 7 November 1990 (age 36); Oyster Bay, New South Wales, Australia
- Genres: Indie rock; folk; acoustic; blue-eyed soul; alternative
- Occupations: Musician; singer-songwriter
- Instruments: Vocals; guitar; piano; banjo; harmonica; glockenspiel; keyboard; flute; hang; bass guitar; drums
- Years active: 2007–present
- Labels: Scorpio; Communion; Atlantic; Elektra; Universal Music Australia; Mercury Records Australia; Rainbow Valley Records
- Website: mattcorby.com

Matthew John Corby (born 7 November 1990) is an Australian singer-songwriter. He achieved his commercial breakthrough with his fourth EP, Into the Flame (2011), which peaked at No. 3 on the ARIA Singles Chart, and by April 2012, was certified 6× Platinum by ARIA. His 2011 single "Brother" and his 2013 single "Resolution" both won ARIA Music Awards for Song of the Year. Corby has released four studio albums, Telluric (2016), Rainbow Valley (2018), Everything's Fine (2023) and Tragic Magic (2026).

== Early life ==
Matthew Corby was born in Sydney, Australia, and raised in Oyster Bay, New South Wales.

Corby's earliest musical memory is being driven past a guitar shop as a five-year-old and being captivated by the rows of shiny instruments in the window. His father John bought his son a three-quarter acoustic guitar for $80, on which Corby started having one lesson a week. The first song he learned to play was "Greensleeves".

Corby attended Inaburra School in Bangor, New South Wales where he grew up steeped in gospel; his passion for music fed first by renditions of "His Eye is on the Sparrow" and later by a love for Crosby, Stills, Nash and Young. Corby attended Shirelive church with his family.

Corby's school principal encouraged him to sing at a school assembly where he performed a song from Sister Act 2.

By the time he was 10, Corby had been trained classically by an opera singer and was making tentative steps into musical theatre, playing a minor role in a production of Cain and Abel and Sutherland Shire Light Opera Company's take on The Secret Garden.

At age 13, Corby joined a church band called Iron and Clay, Corby left the group just before his 16th birthday, and got a job making sandwiches at Subway before going back to school in Year 11, which coincided with his Australian Idol appearance.

== Career ==
=== 2007: Australian Idol ===
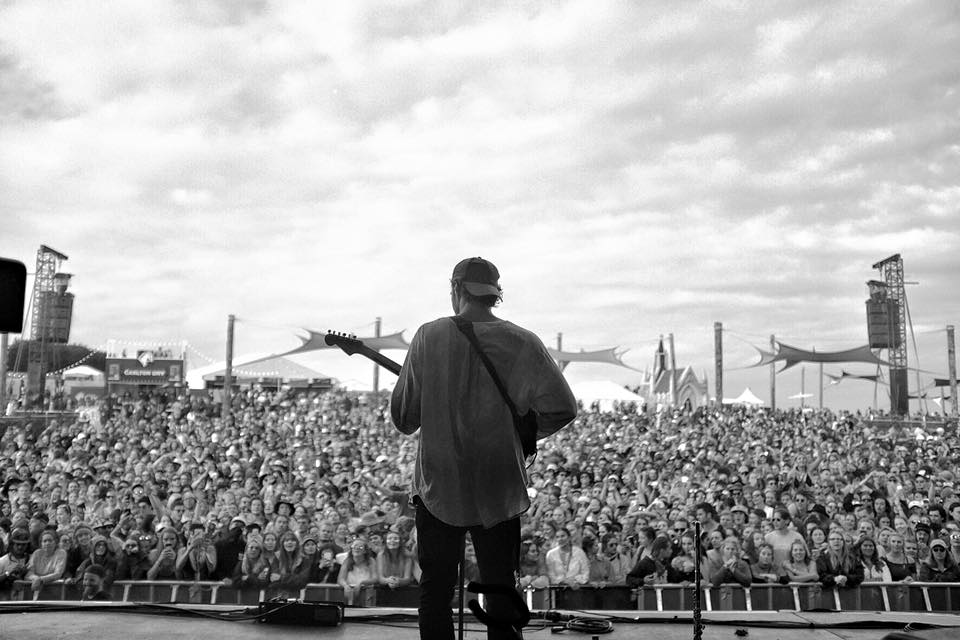

At age 16, Corby auditioned for the fifth season of Australian Idol, where he finished as runner-up. Years later, he described participating in the competition as being a "big fucking mistake", describing how the struggle to forge his own identity post-Idol was bigger than most could have seen from the outside. "I took all the negatives out of that (Idol) and thought 'Bugger, I've ruined everything'".

One aspect of Australian Idol that the media speculated about was the number of Christian musicians among the finalists. The media suggested that Christians were "stacking" the voting to keep "their" artists on the show. Corby rejected those suggestions by stating that he was not part of a big church and was not promoting himself as religious.

Australian Idol performances and results (2007)
Week	Theme	Song	Original artist	Result
Audition	Contestant's Choice	"Superstitious"	Stevie Wonder	Through to Theatre Week
Theatre Week (Line Challenge)	Contestant's Choice	"Hound Dog"	Big Mama Thornton	safe
Theatre Week (Group Challenge)		"End of the Road" (with Rosie Ribbons, Daniel Mifsud & Natalie Gauci)	Boyz II Men	safe
Theatre Week	Contestant's Choice	"Bedouin Song"	Lior	Through to top 24 / semi finals
Top 24 / semi-final	Contestant's Choice	"I Wish"	Stevie Wonder	Through to live shows / top 12
Top 12	Contestant's Choice	"The Scientist"	Coldplay	Safe
Top 11	Rock	"Immigrant Song"	Led Zeppelin	Safe
Top 10	Disco	"Got to Get You Into My Life"	The Beatles	Safe
Top 9	Acoustic	"The Blower's Daughter"	Damien Rice	Safe
Top 8	Brit pop	"Bitter Sweet Symphony"	The Verve	Safe
Top 7	The Year You Were Born	"Another Day in Paradise"	Phil Collins	Bottom 2
Top 6	Judge's Choice / Contestants Choice	"The Music of the Night" "Transatlanticism"	Michael Crawford; Death Cab for Cutie	Safe
Top 5	Australian Made	"20 Good Reasons"	Thirsty Merc	Safe
Top 4	Big Band	"Beyond the Sea" "How Sweet It Is (To Be Loved By You)"	Bobby Darrin; Marvin Gaye	Safe
Top 3	Audience Choice; Contestant's Choice	"It's Too Late" "Across the Universe"	Evermore; The Beatles	Safe
Finale (top 2)	Contestant's Choice; Contestant's Choice; Winner's Single	"Mind's Eye" "High & Dry" "Here I Am"	Wolfmother; Radiohead; Matt Corby	Runner-Up

After the Idol finale, Corby passed on a record deal offered by Sony Music Australia.

The week after he turned 18, Corby landed in London, staying in a friend's attic.

=== 2009–2010: Song for..., My False and Transition to Colour EPs ===
On 5 June 2009, Corby independently released his debut extended play, Song for..., with Scorpio Music.

Whilst in London, Corby met with indie label Communion Music and found himself encouraged to learn the craft of songwriting, to understand the marriage between the force of his voice and the words it carries.

In 2010, Corby released two EPs with Communion, My False and Transition to Colour, but was forced home when he ran out of money, having accrued a debt of around $80,000.

Corby's track "Made of Stone" was featured on an episode of Underbelly: Razor in 2011 and on ABC's Brothers and Sisters. "Lighthome" was in an episode of Home and Away in 2011, and "Song for..." in 2012 on the same TV series. Corby recorded a cover version of INXS's "By My Side" for the band's album, Original Sin, as a bonus track for the iTunes edition. He was featured on a track on Julia Stone's debut solo album, The Memory Machine, and on UK singer-songwriter Passenger's track "Golden Thread", from the 2010 album Flight of the Crow. The EP also featured in The Blacklist starring James Spader.

=== 2011–2012: Into the Flame EP and "Brother" ===
After a few months of writing, Corby spent September 2011 recording his fourth EP, Into the Flame, with producer Tim Carr. The EP showcased a new direction for Corby, including soul-influenced, growling vocals along with a bluesy melody, in conjunction with Corby's signature folk style. The title song has been described as "lyrically raw and endearingly honest". The EP also features a duet with keyboardist Bree Tranter, previously a part of Australian band, The Middle East. The EP provided Corby's first entry on the ARIA Charts, where it reached No. 46 on the ARIA Top 50 Singles Chart on 4 December 2011. It subsequently peaked at No. 3. Upon its release, Corby posted a message on his website and Facebook page:

After 12 months of lots of ups and downs, I'm so excited to share this EP with you. I honestly felt like giving up music back in April but all of you inspired me again. It's been an incredible few months re-connecting with all of you in gardens around Australia. Thank you from the bottom of my heart for all your support. It's been said by others before... but you guys really are the best fans ever. Let's stay close on this journey.

By December 2012, Into the Flame achieved 6× platinum certification by ARIA. Corby supported the release of his EP and its single "Brother" with a national into the Flame Tour. It included a mini Secret Garden Summer Tour around New South Wales. In January 2012, Corby was named the 'Next Big Thing' and won 'Song of the Year' for "Brother" at FBi Radio's annual SMAC Awards in Darlinghurst, New South Wales. He premiered his rendition of The Black Keys' song, "Lonely Boy", for radio station Triple J's segment, Like a Version, with hosts Tom and Alex, along with an acoustic rendition of his own song, "Brother". Both have since received significant attention online. Corby secured a support slot with Feist in Adelaide on her 2012 Australian tour. Early in 2012, he toured throughout the US and UK. Corby's song "Brother" was voted into the No. 3 position for the Triple J Hottest 100, 2011, and his cover of "Lonely Boy" was voted at No. 69 in the Triple J Hottest 100, 2012. Corby released a Digital iTunes Session EP on 7 December 2012, playing five of his songs from his previous EP's acoustically on guitar and one on piano, as well as a rendition of "Amazing Grace". Corby spent the first half of 2013 in Los Angeles, working on his upcoming record, due for release later that year. Corby was nominated for three 2012 ARIA Music Awards, including two nominations in industry voted categories, Breakthrough Artist and Best Male Artist. He won the publicly voted Song of the Year category. The newly recorded version of 'Made of Stone' can be heard on the NCIS television promo in the USA.

Matt was featured on a Hunters & Collectors tribute album collaborating with Australian artist Missy Higgins, recording a version of "This Morning".

=== 2013–2014: Resolution ===
On 21 May 2013, Corby released "Resolution". It became his first charting single, peaked at number 3 on the ARIA Charts. The song also charted in New Zealand and the United Kingdom, becoming his first charting material in those countries. On 12 July 2013, the Resolution EP was released, containing the single and three new original songs. One of which, "Lay You Down", entered the ARIA Charts at number 75 despite receiving no independent promotion.

"Resolution" was voted in eighth place in Triple J Hottest 100, 2013. In December 2013, "Resolution" won the ARIA Award for Song of the Year. On 13 December, Corby released the Live On the Resolution Tour EP. Its five original songs were recorded live at the Australian and New Zealand shows, including a cover of Crosby, Stills, Nash & Young's "Almost Cut My Hair".

Corby got involved with a Brisbane-based arts collective called "Museum Collective", described on their Facebook page as an "Audio Visual Sensory Experience". The band also features Rohin Jones (who is Museum Collective's musical director), Bree Tranter & Michael Haydon, formerly of The Middle East, as well as Lyndon de la Cruz, Kahl Wallis (of The Medics), Bud Rokesky and Tom Wearne. Museum Collective ran free performances at Brisbane's Old Museum building in September & December and also at Woodford Folk Festival on 28 December 2013.

In January 2014, Corby released the song "What the Devil Has Made", arranged specifically for the Spirit of Akasha soundtrack. The surf documentary was inspired by the 1971 film, Morning of the Earth. He recorded all parts of the track – including harmonies, flute and guitar – on his own in his home studio. The soundtrack also features Corby's version of Tamam Shud's "First Things First" (originally used in the 1971 film).

Also in February 2014, Corby's song "Breathe", from his 2010 EP Transition to Colour, was featured in the closing scenes of the 21st episode of the fourth season of the popular US teen drama / mystery thriller TV series Pretty Little Liars, titled "She's Come Undone".

=== 2015–2017: "Monday" and Telluric ===
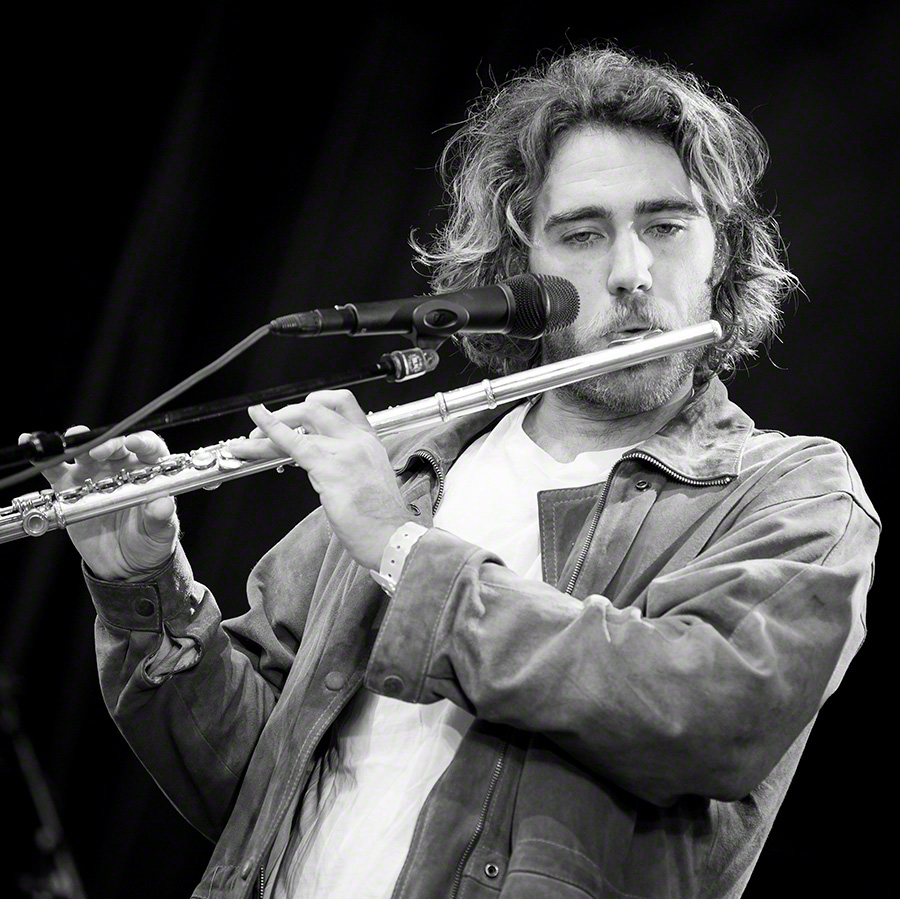
Matt Corby performs at Piknik i Parken in Oslo in June 2016

On 1 October 2015, Corby released his first song in two years, "Monday" from his debut album, Telluric. The song was described as containing "lush, transcendent harmonies, wailing falsetto, folky boom-claps and heartbreaking lyrics." The song reportedly took 10 minutes to record, and was laid down in a cottage in the NSW coastal town of Berry where he wrote and recorded most of the album. Corby said to Matt and Alex of Triple J: "It's stomping on the ground and clapping. It feels good to have that as a composition in a weird way, it's just your voice and everyone who would maybe want to do a cover of that if they so wish, it'll always sound different because they'll have to harmonise with their own [voice]."

"Monday" was voted number 53 in the Triple J Hottest 100, 2015.

Telluric was released on 11 March 2016. American artist, Gary Burden, designed the album cover. It debuted at number one in Australia.

Corby was featured on the track "Serious" from Norwegian DJ Kygo's debut album Cloud Nine, released on 13 May 2016.

=== 2018–2021: Rainbow Valley ===
Corby released his first song in two years, "No Ordinary Life", on 3 August 2018.

On 7 September 2018, Corby announced his second studio album Rainbow Valley would be released on 2 November 2018. Upon release, the album was the highest local debut of the week in Australia, debuting at number 4 on the ARIA charts. He also subsequently released the second, third and fourth singles from the album, titled "All Fired Up", "All That I See" and "Miracle Love".

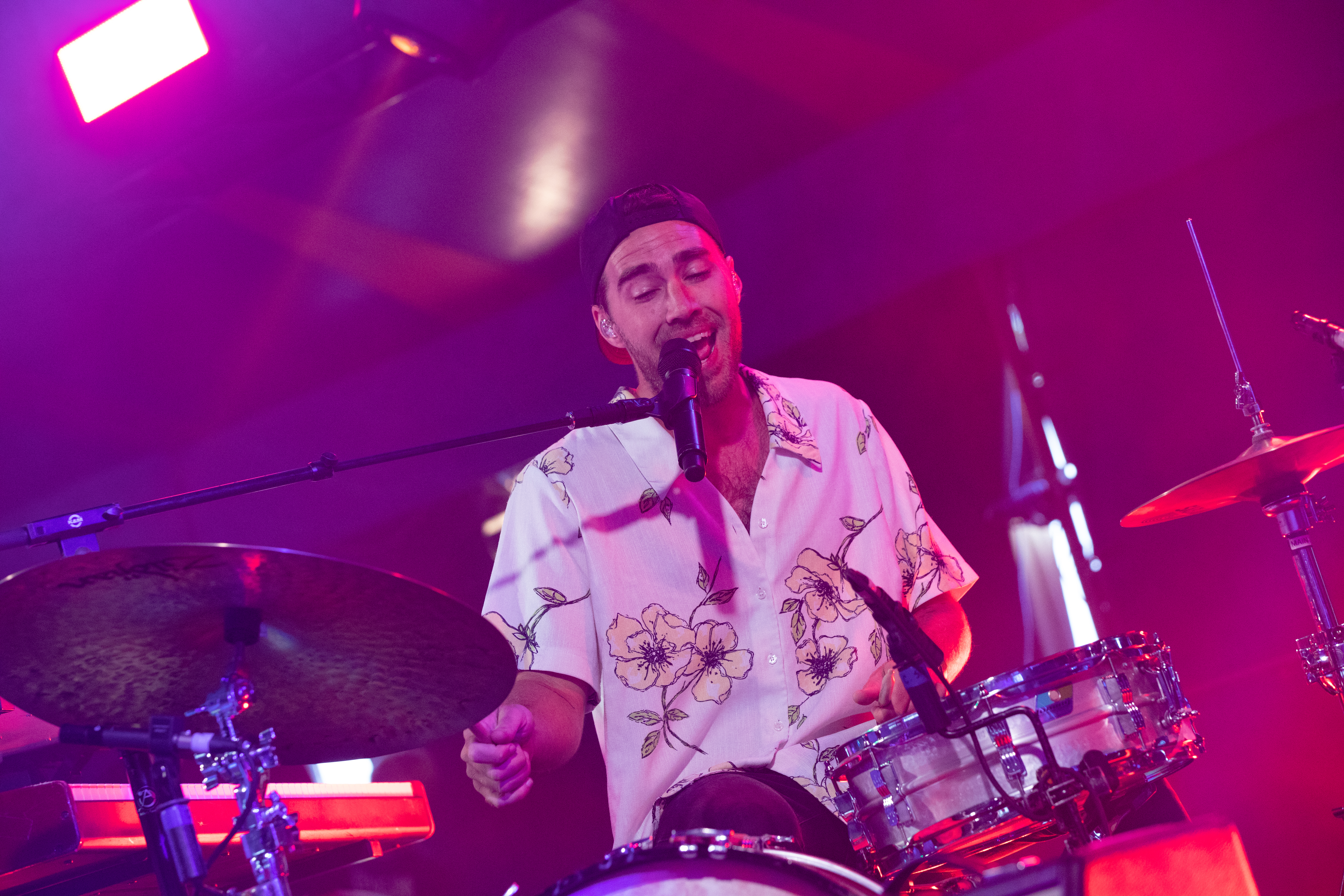
Matt Corby performing at Williams Green Glastonbury Festival 2019

In February 2019, Matt released a mini-documentary, Behind Rainbow Valley, documenting the recording and creative process of the Rainbow Valley album. Speaking of the influence of his newborn son Hugh on the creation of the album, Corby stated: "I wanted to create something that was almost instructional for my little boy... A reference for him of the way I see reality and the simple truths that I've come across. The lyrics are simple truths. I'm not trying to be too clever or poetic. If anything it was, 'This is the way I see the world and this is the way I feel about it'."

Corby embarked on the 2019 Rainbow Valley Tour in Europe, the UK, Australia and New Zealand but many dates were cancelled due to the pandemic towards the end of the tour.

Corby was announced as the replacement for Ziggy Marley after he dropped out at WOMAD 2020, in Adelaide.

In 2020 Corby released the singles "If I Never Say a Word" and "Vitamin".

=== 2022–present: Everything's Fine ===
In November 2022, Corby released his first single in two years, "Problems". In January 2023, Corby announced the release date of his third studio album, Everything's Fine, alongside the release of its second single, "Reelin'". Everything's Fine was released on 24 March 2023.

In February 2025, Corby produced "Call Me When You Get In", a song by Harrison Storm.

In September 2025, Corby released the single "Long and Short" ahead of his supporting Teddy Swims on his Australian I've Tried Everything but Therapy tour in October 2025.

Corby's fourth studio album Tragic Magic was released on 17 April 2026.

== Personal life ==
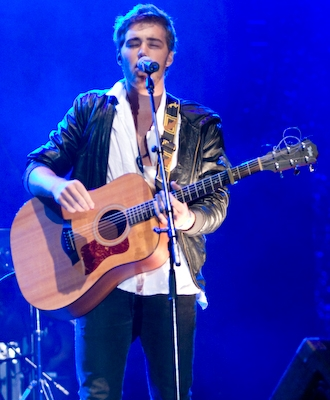
Corby performing at Easterfest 2008

Corby and his sister Grace grew up in the Christian faith after their parents became Christian when Corby was two years old. Corby would sing in church and stated in 2008, "When I was 13, I started touring with a ministry team and we went around schools and churches, promoting Jesus and tackling depression issues and stuff like that. I did that for a couple of years. So I've sort of been in church my whole life and it's been fun". Going into Australian Idol, Corby wondered how his faith would fit in with the show, but stated that it made him self-reliant and brought him closer to God through his own personal drive into Bible study. Corby headlined Easterfest, a Christian music festival in 2008 and a Hillsong United convention.

Although growing up as a strong Christian, Corby is no longer religious, but does understand the draw of a church for young families in particular to have a community connection and collective moral of kindness. Corby once stated: "I'm a stoner and I don't really have much sympathy for religion any more, I basically believe that human beings are pure entities when they're born, and they have the ability to do whatever they want to change the Earth in a positive way. And it's just... they get lied to, and in the process of becoming an adult that ends up fucking up the world."

By the time he was 20 he was reading books on philosophy and neuroscience, the latter because he wanted to know how the brain functions, partly because of his experiences with depression and anxiety. "People have said I have depression before, especially when I was younger. People were like, you should really go see someone. But I just thought, no, I'm pretty sure the human brain is capable of so much more than what I'm being told I'm capable of. When people say you need help it's like, do I? With what? And if you could just tell me what I need help with, couldn't I just go and work on it myself?" His search for self led him to spiritual authors such as Eckhart Tolle, and to experimenting with magic mushrooms: "You take mushrooms and then you go, I have no problems," he explains. "I am an ant walking around this planet in a speck in the middle of nowhere. And that's the truth, it's all we are."

Corby's musical influences include artists such as Jeff Buckley, Lauryn Hill, Crosby, Stills, Nash & Young, Sufjan Stevens, Patrick Watson, Scott Mathews, Nick Drake, Nina Simone, Otis Redding, Bon Iver, Bob Dylan, Buddy Guy, Charles Bradley and Sam Cooke. Corby is good friends with Australian musician Jarryd James, whom Corby credits with having helped with his musical development.

In early 2018, Corby became a father with his first child Hugh. Speaking to Beat Magazine regarding the way fatherhood has changed his perspective, he stated: "Most of my life, music has been the number one focus. And now it sort of doesn't fit in that category anymore – it's really important, but, it's not as important as my child...When I come back to music, I'm then a lot happier and it's not like I'm constantly exposing myself to only music, and then getting really annoyed about it, or getting hard on myself."

Corby plays guitar, piano, drums, flute amongst other instruments.

Corby currently resides with his Kelpie Django, partner and two children on his five-acre rainforest property called Rainbow Valley near Byron Bay, New South Wales.

== Discography ==
- Telluric (2016)
- Rainbow Valley (2018)
- Everything's Fine (2023)
- Tragic Magic (2026)

== Tours ==
- Telluric Tour (2016)
- Rainbow Valley Tour (2019)
- Everything's Fine Tour (2023)

== Awards and nominations ==
=== APRA Awards ===
The APRA Awards are presented annually from 1982 by the Australasian Performing Right Association (APRA), "honouring composers and songwriters". Matt Corby has received two nominations.

Year	Nominee / work	Award	Result
2012	Matt Corby	Breakthrough Songwriter of the Year	Nominated
2012	"Brother" (Matt Corby)	Song of the Year	Nominated
2014	"Resolution" (Matt Corby)	Song of the Year	Nominated
2014	"Resolution" (Matt Corby)	Pop Song of the Year	Nominated
2014	"Resolution" (Matt Corby)	Most Played Australian Work	Nominated
2017	"Smooth Wine Lady" (Matt Corby and John Henriksson)	Song of the Year	Shortlisted
2020	"Miracle Love" (Matt Corby)	Most Performed Alternate Work of the Year	Nominated
2021	"If I Never Say a Word (Matt Corby and Matthew Neighbour)	Song of the Year	Shortlisted
2021	"Pretty Lady" by Tash Sultana (Tash Sultana, Matt Corby, Dann Hume)	Most Performed Blues & Roots Work	Nominated
2022	"Higher" by Budjerah (Budjerah Slabb, Matt Corby)	Most Performed R&B/Soul Work of the Year	Won
2022	"Higher" by Budjerah (Budjerah Slabb, Matt Corby)	Song of the Year	Shortlisted
2024	"Reelin'"	Song of the Year	Shortlisted

=== ARIA Music Awards ===
The ARIA Music Awards is an annual award ceremony event celebrating the Australian music industry.

Year	Nominee / work	Award	Result	Ref.
2012	"Brother"	Song of the Year	Won	
2012	"Brother"	Breakthrough Artist - Release	Nominated	
2012	Into The Flame	Best Male Artist	Nominated	
2013	"Resolution"	Song of the Year	Won	
2013	"Resolution" directed by Bryce Jepson	Best Video	Nominated	
2013	"Resolution"	Best Male Artist	Nominated	
2013	Australian Tour	Best Australian Live Act	Nominated	
2016	Telluric	Best Adult Alternative Album	Nominated	
2019	Rainbow Valley	Best Male Artist	Nominated	
2019	Rainbow Valley	Best Soul/R&B Release	Nominated	
2019	Dann Hume for Rainbow Valley	Producer of the Year	Won	
2021	for Budjerah Budjerah (EP)	Producer of the Year	Nominated	
2021	for Budjerah Budjerah (EP)	Engineer of the Year	Nominated	
2023	Everything's Fine	Album of the Year	Nominated	
2023	Matt Corby, Chris Collins, Nat Dunn, Alex Henrikssen for Matt Corby – Everything's Fine	Best Produced Release	Nominated	
2023	Dann Hume, Chris Collins, Matt Corby for Matt Corby – Everything's Fine	Best Engineered Release	Nominated	
2023	Matt Corby – Wild Turkey: Music 101: Trust Your Spirit (BRING Agency)	Best Use of an Australian Recording in an Advertisement	Nominated	
2026	Tragic Magic	Best Solo Artist	Nominated	
2026	Tragic Magic	Best Adult Contemporary Album	Won	
2026	Miriam David and Pat Fox for Matt Corby – Tragic Magic	Best Cover Art	Nominated	

=== J Awards ===
The J Awards are an annual series of Australian music awards that were established by the Australian Broadcasting Corporation's youth-focused radio station Triple J. They commenced in 2005.

Year	Nominee / work	Award	Result	Ref.
2019	Rainbow Valley	Australian Album of the Year	Won	
2023	Everything’s Fine	Australian Album of the Year	Nominated	

=== National Live Music Awards ===
The National Live Music Awards (NLMAs) are a broad recognition of Australia's diverse live industry, celebrating the success of the Australian live scene. The awards commenced in 2016.

Year	Nominee / work	Award	Result
2019	himself	Live Voice of the Year	Nominated

=== Vanda & Young Global Songwriting Competition ===
The Vanda & Young Global Songwriting Competition is an annual competition that "acknowledges great songwriting whilst supporting and raising money for Nordoff-Robbins" and is coordinated by Albert Music and APRA AMCOS. It commenced in 2009.

Year	Nominee / work	Award	Result
2009		Vanda & Young Global Songwriting Competition	Final 12
2019	"Miracle Love"	Vanda & Young Global Songwriting Competition	1st

=== Other awards ===
Year	Type	Award	Result
2011	FBi Radio SMAC Awards	Next Big Thing	Won
2011	FBi Radio SMAC Awards	Song of the Year ("Brother")	Won
