= Dean Lewis discography =

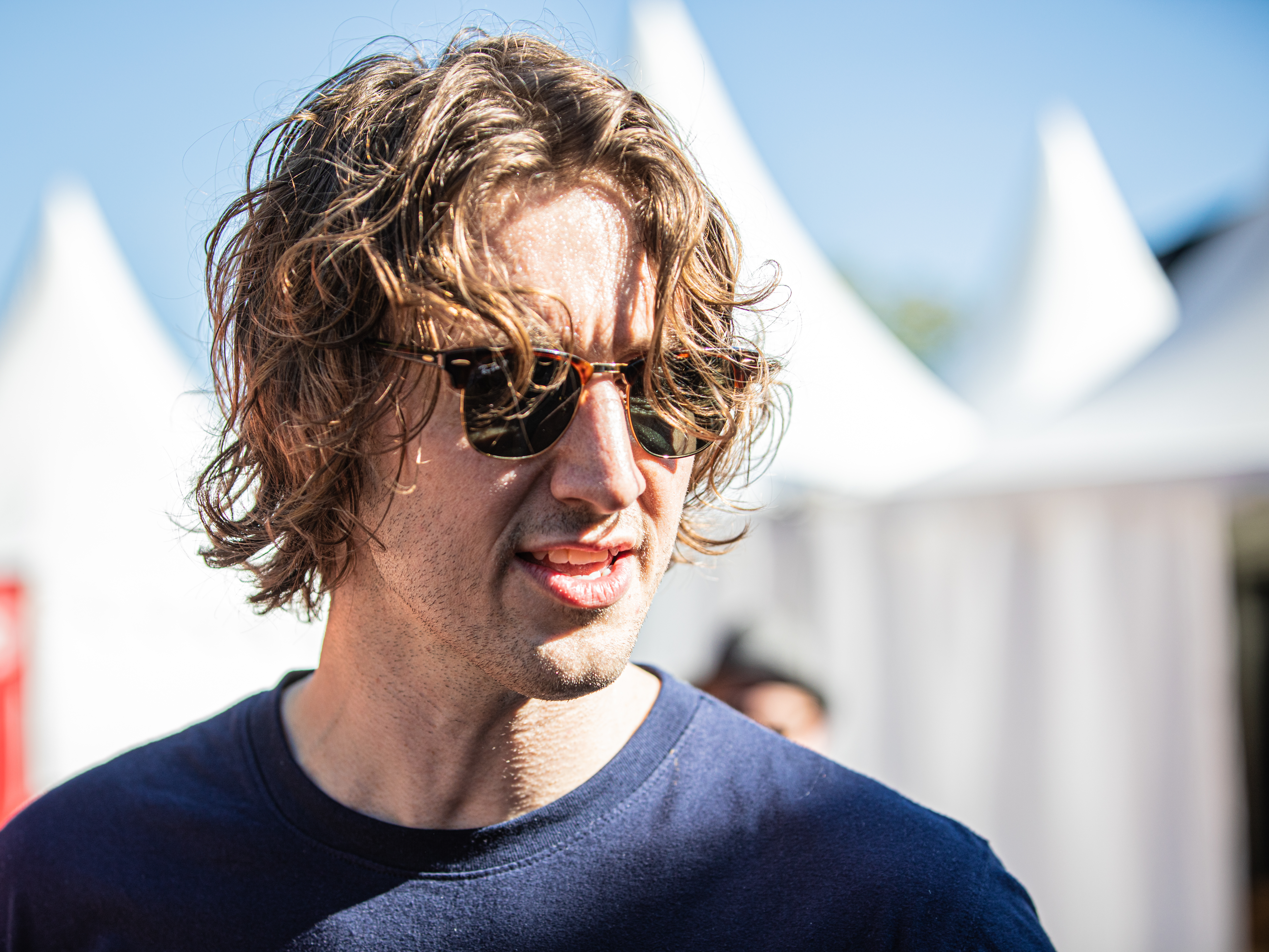
- Lewis in 2019
- Studio albums: 3
- EPs: 1
- Singles: 30
- Music videos: 25

The discography of Dean Lewis, an Australian singer, consists of three studio albums, one EP and thirty singles.

== Studio albums ==
List of studio albums, with selected chart positions and certifications shown
Title	Album details	Peak chart positions										Certifications
Title	Album details	AUS	BEL (FL)	CAN	DEN	GER	NLD	NZ	SWE	UK	US	Certifications
A Place We Knew	Released: 22 March 2019; Label: Island, Universal Australia; Formats: CD, LP, digital download, streaming	1	30	15	3	32	21	7	27	37	31	ARIA: 2× Platinum; BPI: Gold; GLF: Platinum; IFPI DEN: 3× Platinum; IFPI NOR: 2× Platinum; MC: 2× Platinum; RIAA: Gold; RMNZ: 2× Platinum
The Hardest Love	Released: 4 November 2022; Label: Island, Universal Australia; Formats: CD, LP, digital download, streaming	4	51	60	37	56	28	—	48	—	—	IFPI DEN: Gold; MC: Gold; RMNZ: Gold
The Epilogue	Released: 18 October 2024; Label: Island, Universal Australia; Formats: CD, LP, digital download, streaming	2	44	—	—	66	17	—	—	—	—	
"—" denotes a recording that did not chart or was not released in that territory.

== Extended plays ==
List of EPs, with selected chart positions
Title	EP details	Peak chart positions	Certifications
Title	EP details	AUS	Certifications
Same Kind of Different	Released: 28 April 2017; Label: Island, Universal Australia; Formats: CD, digital download	27	ARIA: Gold; BPI: Silver; RMNZ: Gold

== Singles ==
List of singles, with year released, selected chart positions, certifications, and album name shown
Title	Year	Peak chart positions										Certifications	Album
Title	Year	AUS	BEL (FL)	CAN	DEN	IRE	NOR	NZ	SWE	UK	US	Certifications	Album
"Waves"	2016	12	52	—	—	97	—	—	—	—	—	ARIA: 11× Platinum; BPI: Platinum; GLF: 2× Platinum; IFPI DEN: Platinum; IFPI NOR: 2× Platinum; MC: 4× Platinum; RIAA: Platinum; RMNZ: 3× Platinum	Same Kind of Different
"Need You Now"	2017	108	—	—	—	—	—	—	—	—	—	ARIA: 2× Platinum; BPI: Silver; GLF: Gold; IFPI DEN: Gold; MC: Gold; RMNZ: Gold	Same Kind of Different
"Lose My Mind"	2017	50	—	—	—	—	—	—	—	—	—	ARIA: 3× Platinum; BPI: Silver; GLF: Gold; MC: Gold; RMNZ: Gold	Same Kind of Different
"Chemicals"	2018	—	—	—	—	—	—	—	—	—	—	ARIA: Platinum; GLF: Gold; MC: Gold; RMNZ: Gold	Same Kind of Different
"Be Alright"	2018	1	1	27	5	4	2	3	2	11	23	ARIA: 16× Platinum; BPI: 3× Platinum; BRMA: 2× Platinum; GLF: 7× Platinum; IFPI DEN: 5× Platinum; IFPI NOR: 6× Platinum; MC: 9× Platinum; RIAA: 5× Platinum; RMNZ: 7× Platinum	A Place We Knew
"7 Minutes"	2019	10	78	—	—	53	—	— (Note: "7 Minutes" did not enter the NZ Top 40 Singles Chart, but peaked at number five on the NZ Hot Singles Chart.)	65	—	—	ARIA: 4× Platinum; BPI: Silver; GLF: Gold; IFPI DEN: Gold; IFPI NOR: Gold; MC: Platinum; RMNZ: Platinum	A Place We Knew
"Stay Awake"	2019	26	82	—	—	91	—	— (Note: "Stay Awake" did not enter the NZ Top 40 Singles Chart, but peaked at number three on the NZ Hot Singles Chart.)	— (Note: "Stay Awake" did not enter the Swedish Singellista Chart, but peaked at number 17 on the Swedish Heatseeker Chart.)	100	—	ARIA: 3× Platinum; BPI: Silver; IFPI NOR: Gold; MC: Platinum; RMNZ: Platinum	A Place We Knew
"Straight Back Down"	2019	—	—	—	—	—	—	—	—	—	—		A Place We Knew
"Used to Love" (with Martin Garrix)	2019	46	25	92	―	60	29	― (Note: "Used to Love" did not enter the NZ Top 40 Singles Chart, but peaked at number 14 on the NZ Hot Singles Chart.)	40	―	―	ARIA: Gold; RMNZ: Gold	Non-album singles
"Falling Up"	2021	48	—	—	—	—	—	— (Note: "Falling Up" did not enter the NZ Top 40 Singles Chart, but peaked at number 12 on the NZ Hot Singles Chart.)	—	—	—	ARIA: Platinum	Non-album singles
"Looks Like Me"	2021	82	—	—	—	—	—	— (Note: "Looks Like Me" did not enter the NZ Top 40 Singles Chart, but peaked at number 17 on the NZ Hot Singles Chart.)	—	—	—	ARIA: Platinum; MC: Gold	The Hardest Love
"Hurtless"	2022	29	—	100	8	75	—	— (Note: "Hurtless" did not enter the NZ Top 40 Singles Chart, but peaked at number seven on the NZ Hot Singles Chart.)	— (Note: "Hurtless" did not enter the Swedish Singellista Chart, but peaked at number one on the Swedish Heatseeker Chart.)	—	—	ARIA: 2× Platinum; BPI: Silver; IFPI DEN: Platinum; MC: Gold; RMNZ: Gold	The Hardest Love
"Never Really Loved Me" (with Kygo)	2022	—	—	—	—	—	14	— (Note: "Never Really Loved Me" did not enter the NZ Top 40 Singles Chart, but peaked at number 16 on the NZ Hot Singles Chart.)	16	—	—	GLF: Gold	Thrill of the Chase
"Lost Without You" (with Kygo)	2022	—	40	—	—	—	—	— (Note: "Lost Without You" did not enter the NZ Top 40 Singles Chart, but peaked at number 13 on the NZ Hot Singles Chart.)	66	—	—		Thrill of the Chase
"How Do I Say Goodbye"	2022	14	5	42	7	16	5	40	19	23	— (Note: "How Do I Say Goodbye" did not enter the Billboard Hot 100, but peaked at number five on the Bubbling Under Hot 100 Singles chart.)	ARIA: 4× Platinum; BPI: Platinum; BRMA: Platinum; GLF: Platinum; IFPI DEN: 2× Platinum; MC: 2× Platinum; RMNZ: 2× Platinum	The Hardest Love
"In a Perfect World" (with Julia Michaels)	2023	—	—	—	—	—	—	— (Note: "In a Perfect World" did not enter the NZ Top 40 Singles Chart, but peaked at number 10 on the NZ Hot Singles Chart.)	— (Note: "In a Perfect World" did not enter the Swedish Singellista Chart, but peaked at number five on the Swedish Heatseeker Chart.)	—	—		Non-album single
"Trust Me Mate"	2023	—	19	—	—	—	—	— (Note: "Trust Me Mate" did not enter the NZ Top 40 Singles Chart, but peaked at number 17 on the NZ Hot Singles Chart.)	—	—	—		The Epilogue
"28" (with Ruth B.)	2023	—	—	—	—	—	—	—	—	—	—		Non-album single
"Memories"	2024	—	—	—	—	—	—	—	— (Note: "Memories" did not enter the Swedish Singellista Chart, but peaked at number one on the Swedish Heatseeker Chart.)	—	—		The Epilogue
"The Last Bit of Us"	2024	—	—	—	—	—	—	— (Note: "The Last Bit of Us" did not enter the NZ Top 40 Singles Chart, but peaked at number 26 on the NZ Hot Singles Chart.)	—	—	—		The Epilogue
"All I Ever Wanted"	2024	—	—	—	—	—	—	— (Note: "All I Ever Wanted" did not enter the NZ Top 40 Singles Chart, but peaked at number 27 on the NZ Hot Singles Chart.)	—	—	—		The Epilogue
"Fall at Your Feet" (with Cyril)	2024	84	—	—	—	—	—	— (Note: "Fall at Your Feet" did not enter the NZ Top 40 Singles Chart, but peaked at number seven on the NZ Hot Singles Chart.)	—	—	—	ARIA: Gold; RMNZ: Gold	From Down Under
"Rest" (with Sasha Alex Sloan)	2024	—	—	—	—	—	—	— (Note: "Rest" did not enter the NZ Top 40 Singles Chart, but peaked at number 37 on the NZ Hot Singles Chart.)	—	—	—		The Epilogue
"Middle of Love" (with Picture This)	2024	—	—	—	—	97	—	—	—	—	—		Non-album singles
"Fix You" (with Daniel Seavey)	2024	—	—	—	—	—	—	—	—	—	—		Non-album singles
"Empire"	2024	—	—	—	—	—	—	— (Note: "Empire" did not enter the NZ Top 40 Singles Chart, but peaked at number 31 on the NZ Hot Singles Chart.)	—	—	—		The Epilogue
"With You"	2025	—	—	—	—	—	—	— (Note: "With You" did not enter the NZ Top 40 Singles Chart, but peaked at number 15 on the NZ Hot Singles Chart.)	—	—	—		The Epilogue (Deluxe)
"I Hate That It's True"	2025	—	19	—	—	—	—	— (Note: "I Hate That It's True" did not enter the NZ Top 40 Singles Chart, but peaked at number 19 on the NZ Hot Singles Chart.)	—	—	—		The Epilogue (Deluxe)
"Truth"	2025	—	—	—	—	—	—	—	—	—	—		The Epilogue (Deluxe)
"Learn to Love" (with Zoe Wees)	2025	—	—	—	—	—	—	— (Note: "Learn to Love" did not enter the NZ Top 40 Singles Chart, but peaked at number 34 on the NZ Hot Singles Chart.)	—	—	—		TBA
"I'm Getting Well"	2026	—	—	—	—	—	—	—	—	—	—		TBA
"Enjoy While It Lasts"	2026	—	—	—	—	—	—	—	—	—	—		TBA
"Seconds Before the Sunrise"	2026	—	—	—	—	—	—	— (Note: "Seconds Before the Sunrise" did not enter the NZ Top 40 Singles Chart, but peaked at number 36 on the NZ Hot Singles Chart.)	—	—	—		TBA
"Poison"	2026	—	—	—	—	—	—	— (Note: "Poison" did not enter the NZ Top 40 Singles Chart, but peaked at number 34 on the NZ Hot Singles Chart.)	—	—	—		TBA
"From Ember to Ash to Smoke"	2026	—	—	—	—	—	—	—	—	—	—		TBA
"—" denotes a recording that did not chart or was not released in that territory.

== Other charted and certified songs ==
List of other charted songs, with selected chart positions
Title	Year	Peak chart positions			Certifications	Album
Title	Year	DEN	NZ Hot	SWE	Certifications	Album
"Let Go"	2018	—	—	—	ARIA: Gold	Same Kind of Different
"Hold of Me"	2019	—	40	—		A Place We Knew
"A Place We Knew"	2019	—	—	—	ARIA: Gold	A Place We Knew
"Half a Man"	2019	1	—	73	ARIA: 2× Platinum; BPI: Gold; GLF: Platinum; IFPI DEN: 3× Platinum; IFPI NOR: Platinum; MC: Platinum; RMNZ: Platinum	A Place We Knew
"All for You"	2022	—	27	—		The Hardest Love
"Loved You Better" (with Jonas Brothers)	2025	—	29	—		Greetings from Your Hometown
"—" denotes a recording that did not chart or was not released in that territory.

== Music videos ==
Year	Video	Directed
2016	"Waves"	Mick Jones
2017	"Need You Now"	Mick Jones and Dean Lewis
2017	"Lose My Mind"	Josh Logue
2018	"Chemicals"	Mick Jones
2018	"Be Alright"	Jessie Hill
2019	"7 Minutes"	Stevie Russell
2019	"Stay Awake"	Stevie Russell
2019	"Used to Love"	
2021	"Falling Up"	Tim Mattia
2021	"Looks Like Me"	Tim Mattia
2022	"Hurtless"	James Fitzgerald
2022	"How Do I Say Goodbye"	Sean Loaney
2023	"Trust Me Mate"	Luke Shaw and Landon Juern
2024	"Memories"	Sean Loaney and Mick Jones
2024	"The Last Bit of Us"	Sean Loaney
2024	"All I Ever Wanted"	Sean Loaney
2024	"Rest"	Sean Loaney
2024	"Middle of Love"" (with Picture This)	
2024	"Empire"	Luke Shaw and Landon Juern
2025	"With You"	Sean Loaney
2025	"With You" (with Sofia Camara)	Sean Loaney
2025	"I Hate That It's True"	Tim Madden
2025	"Truth"	Mick Jones and Sean Loaney
2025	"Hurt So Bad"	Sean Loaney
2026	"I Am Getting Well"	Sean Loaney
