= Stay Awake (Dean Lewis song) =

- Acoustic cover art

Single by Dean Lewis

from the album A Place We Knew
- Released: 18 March 2019
- Length: 3:05
- Label: Island Australia; Universal Australia
- Songwriters: Dean Lewis; Neil Ormandy; Steven Solomon
- Producers: Lewis; Nick Atkinson; Edd Holloway; Solomon

Dean Lewis singles chronology
"7 Minutes" (2019)	"Stay Awake" (2019)	"Straight Back Down" (2019)

Music video
- "Stay Awake" on YouTube

"Stay Awake" is a song by Australian singer and songwriter Dean Lewis. The song was released in March 2019 as the third single from Lewis' debut studio album, A Place We Knew. Upon release Lewis said "it's about trying to hold onto someone who is thinking of leaving... It sounds happy, but if you listen to the lyrics you'll realise it's not.

After being added to Australian mainstream radio stations on 29 March, it was the most added song the following charting week.

== Music video ==
The music video for "Stay Awake" was released on 17 April 2019.

== Track listing ==
No.	Title	Length
1.	"Stay Awake" (Acoustic)	3:18
2.	"Stay Awake" (Guitar acoustic)	3:01
3.	"Stay Awake" (Album version)	3:05

== Charts ==
=== Weekly charts ===
Chart (2019)	Peak position
Australia (ARIA)	26
Belgium (Ultratip Bubbling Under Flanders)	32
Belgium (Ultratip Bubbling Under Wallonia)	5
Ireland (IRMA)	97
New Zealand Hot Singles (RMNZ)	3
UK Singles (OCC)	100
US Adult Pop Airplay (Billboard)	20

=== Year-end charts ===
Chart (2019)	Position
Australian Artist (ARIA)	17

== Certifications ==
Region	Certification	Certified units/sales
Australia (ARIA)	3× Platinum	210,000^{‡}
Canada (Music Canada)	Platinum	80,000^{‡}
New Zealand (RMNZ)	Platinum	30,000^{‡}
Norway (IFPI Norway)	Gold	30,000^{‡}
United Kingdom (BPI)	Silver	200,000^{‡}
^{‡} Sales+streaming figures based on certification alone.

== Release history ==
Country	Release date	Format	Label
Australia	19 March 2019	Digital download; streaming	Island Australia; Universal Australia
Australia	29 March 2019	Contemporary hit radio	Island Australia; Universal Australia
Australia	31 May 2019	Digital download; streaming	Island Australia; Universal Australia
