= A Place We Knew =

Studio album by Dean Lewis
- Released: 22 March 2019
- Length: 40:09
- Label: Island
- Producers: Edd Holloway; Nick Atkinson; John Castle; Dylan Nash

Dean Lewis chronology
Same Kind of Different (2017)	A Place We Knew (2019)	The Hardest Love (2022)

Singles from A Place We Knew
- 1. "Be Alright" Released: 29 June 2018; 2. "7 Minutes" Released: 18 January 2019; 3. "Stay Awake" Released: 18 March 2019; 4. "Straight Back Down" Released: 30 August 2019

A Place We Knew is the debut studio album by Australian singer and songwriter Dean Lewis. The album was released on 22 March 2019. The album was announced in February 2019, with Lewis revealing that "all the songs were written through relationships I'd been in and houses I used to live in and hotel rooms".

Of the album, Dean stated that "Things come and go so fast, but I wanted to make something authentic, raw", describing the title as "encapsulat(ing) the bittersweet memories of past relationships".

The album topped the Australian chart upon release. It will be supported by a US and European tour from February to April 2019, as well as a five-date Australia and New Zealand tour in May 2019. During his musical guest appearance on Jimmy Kimmel Live! on 18 March 2019, Lewis performed "7 Minutes" and "Stay Awake" to support the release of the album.

At the ARIA Music Awards of 2019, the album was nominated for three awards, winning Album of the Year and Best Male Artist. and Song of the Year for "7 Minutes".

== Singles ==
"Be Alright" is the album's lead single, released on 29 June 2018 and peaked at number 1 in Australia and won an ARIA Music Award at the ARIA Music Awards of 2018. "7 Minutes" was released on 18 January 2019 as the album's second single and peaked at number 10 in Australia. "Stay Awake" released on 19 March 2019 as the album's third single. "Straight Back Down" was released to radio on 30 August 2019 as the album's fourth single.

The album includes the singles "Waves" and "Chemicals" from Lewis's 2017 extended play Same Kind of Different.

== Critical reception ==
Professional ratings
Review scores
Source	Rating
AllMusic	3.5/5 stars
Herald Sun	3.5/5 stars
Who Magazine	5/5 stars

AllMusic critic Neil Z. Yeung gave A Place We Knew an overall positive review, commending the lyrics, saying it shows "simple yet evocative storytelling, resulting in painfully relatable snapshots of times when things just don't work out". Cameron Adams from Herald Sun gave the album 3.5 out of 5 stars saying "Vance Joy, and before him Ed Sheeran and The Lumineers, [have] set the sonic blueprint for Lewis' who is 'seizing the moment' for super-ultra-non-toxic masculinity in music." Suggesting to try this album if you like Joy and Sheeran".

Gavin Scott from Who Magazine gave the album 5 out of 5 stars saying "Thanks to both the deeply personal nature of Lewis' lyrics, inspired by his own real-life relationships, and the pain and emotion that comes through in his vocals, it's impossible not to feel moved by A Place We Knew. A substantial, meaningful album for a world too often distracted by frivolity."

Jeff Jenkins from Stack Magazine said "His break-up balladry – emotive, anthemic and folk-tinged – falls somewhere between Ed Sheeran and Sheppard. It's a potent formula". Brodie Lancaster from The Saturday Paper said "The appeal of Dean Lewis's debut album is that the earnest musings on broken relationships can be moulded to anyone's story. But what his formulaic songwriting gains in popularity, it lacks in depth and insight".

== Track listing ==
All tracks are written by Dean Lewis, with additional co-writers as noted.

A Place We Knew track listing
No.	Title	Writer(s)	Producer(s)	Length
1.	"Hold of Me"		Dylan Nash	3:22
2.	"7 Minutes"	Nicholas Atkinson; Edd Holloway	Atkinson; Holloway; Nash^{[b]}	3:31
3.	"A Place We Knew"		Dann Hume; Nash^{[b]}	3:26
4.	"Stay Awake"	Neil Ormandy; Steven Solomon	Solomon; Atkinson; Holloway; Nash^{[a]}	3:05
5.	"Waves"	Atkinson; Holloway	Atkinson; Holloway	4:00
6.	"Be Alright"	Jonathan Hume	Atkinson; Holloway; Nash^{[b]}	3:16
7.	"Chemicals"		John Castle; Holloway^{[b]}	3:41
8.	"Straight Back Down"	Atkinson; Holloway	Atkinson; Holloway; Nash^{[b]}	3:25
9.	"Time to Go"		D. Hume	3:10
10.	"Don't Hold Me"	J. Hume	Castle; Atkinson^{[b]}; Holloway^{[b]}; Nash^{[b]}	2:59
11.	"For the Last Time"		Atkinson; Holloway; Nash^{[b]}	3:15
12.	"Half a Man"	Hayley Warner; J. Hume	Atkinson; Holloway	2:59
Total length:				40:09

== Charts ==
=== Weekly charts ===
Weekly chart performance for A Place We Knew
Chart (2019)	Peak position
Australian Albums (ARIA)	1
Austrian Albums (Ö3 Austria)	33
Belgian Albums (Ultratop Flanders)	30
Belgian Albums (Ultratop Wallonia)	61
Canadian Albums (Billboard)	15
Danish Albums (Hitlisten)	28
Dutch Albums (Album Top 100)	21
Finnish Albums (Suomen virallinen lista)	27
French Albums (SNEP)	60
German Albums (Offizielle Top 100)	32
Irish Albums (IRMA)	20
Latvian Albums (LAIPA)	15
Lithuanian Albums (AGATA)	20
New Zealand Albums (RMNZ)	7
Norwegian Albums (VG-lista)	25
Swedish Albums (Sverigetopplistan)	46
Swiss Albums (Schweizer Hitparade)	11
UK Albums (Official Charts)	37
US Billboard 200	31

2022 weekly chart performance for A Place We Knew
Chart (2022)	Peak position
Danish Albums (Hitlisten)	3
Swedish Albums (Sverigetopplistan)	27

=== Year-end charts ===
Year-end chart performance for A Place We Knew
Chart (2019)	Position
Australian Albums (ARIA)	16
Australian Artist Albums (ARIA)	2
Belgian Albums (Ultratop Flanders)	174
New Zealand Albums (RMNZ)	41
Chart (2020)	Position
Australian Albums (ARIA)	42
Australian Artist Albums (ARIA)	11
Belgian Albums (Ultratop Flanders)	132
Chart (2021)	Position
Australian Albums (ARIA)	85
Australian Artist Albums (ARIA)	12
Chart (2022)	Position
Australian Albums (ARIA)	93
Australian Artist Albums (ARIA)	10
Danish Albums (Hitlisten)	10
Chart (2023)	Position
Australian Artist Albums (ARIA)	13
Danish Albums (Hitlisten)	86
Chart (2024)	Position
Australian Artist Albums (ARIA)	46
Chart (2025)	Position
Australian Artist Albums (ARIA)	49
Belgian Albums (Ultratop Flanders)	184

== Certifications ==
Certifications for A Place We Knew
Region	Certification	Certified units/sales
Australia (ARIA)	2× Platinum	140,000^{‡}
Canada (Music Canada)	2× Platinum	160,000^{‡}
Denmark (IFPI Danmark)	3× Platinum	60,000^{‡}
France (SNEP)	Gold	50,000^{‡}
Italy (FIMI)	Gold	25,000^{‡}
New Zealand (RMNZ)	2× Platinum	30,000^{‡}
Norway (IFPI Norway)	2× Platinum	40,000^{‡}
Poland (ZPAV)	Platinum	20,000^{‡}
Singapore (RIAS)	Gold	5,000^{*}
Sweden (GLF)	Platinum	30,000^{‡}
United Kingdom (BPI)	Gold	100,000^{‡}
United States (RIAA)	Gold	500,000^{‡}
^{*} Sales figures based on certification alone.^{‡} Sales+streaming figures based on certification alone.

== Release history ==
Release history and formats for A Place We Knew
Country	Date	Format	Label	Catalogue
Various	22 March 2019	Digital download; CD	Island	7739314
Australia / Europe	10 May 2019	LP	Island Records / Universal Music	7739316/ 7739317
