= Straight Back Down =

Single by Dean Lewis

from the album A Place We Knew
- Released: 30 August 2019
- Length: 3:25
- Label: Island Australia; Universal Australia
- Songwriters: Dean Lewis; Nicholas Atkinson; Edd Holloway
- Producers: Nick Atkinson; Edd Holloway; Dylan Nash

Dean Lewis singles chronology
"Stay Awake" (2019)	"Straight Back Down" (2019)	"Used to Love" (2019)

Audio video
- "Straight Back Down" on YouTube

"Straight Back Down" is a song by Australian singer and songwriter Dean Lewis. The song was released to commercial hit radio in August 2019 as the fourth single from Lewis' debut studio album, A Place We Knew. It was the most added song to radio the following week.

== Reception ==
In an album review, Cameron Adams from Herald Sun said "'Straight Back Down' adopts the familiar Vance Joy stance and Lewis gets to showcase his upper register." Island Records said "The climactic chorus of 'Straight Back Down' is tailor made for festivals."

== Release history ==
Country	Release date	Format	Label
Australia	30 August 2019	Digital download; streaming; Contemporary hit radio	Island Australia; Universal Australia
