= Need You Now (Dean Lewis song) =

Single by Dean Lewis

from the EP Same Kind of Different
- Released: 7 April 2017
- Length: 3:32
- Label: Island Australia; Universal Australia
- Songwriters: Dean Lewis; Brad Mair; Matt Weedon; Theo Weedon; Alkemi
- Producers: Mair; John Castle; Edd Holloway

Dean Lewis singles chronology
"Waves" (2016)	"Need You Now" (2017)	"Lose My Mind" (2017)

Music video
- "Need You Now" on YouTube

"Need You Now" is a song by Australian singer-songwriter Dean Lewis, released on 7 April 2017 by Island Records Australia and Universal Music Australia as the second single from his debut extended play Same Kind of Different (2017).

The song was certified gold in Australia in February 2018, before being certified Platinum in 2019.

An acoustic version was released on 30 June 2017.

== Music video ==
The music video for "Need You Now" was directed by Mick Jones and released on 27 April 2017. The video charts a man's inner demons, addiction problems and continual self-destruction. Lewis explained to MusicFeeds: "Instead of the video being a direct reflection of the lyrics, we came up with this dark idea of this guy who is keeping everything together on the surface but on weekends he loses himself. I have seen a lot of friends who have gone through that, so it's close to home for me."

== Track listing ==
No.	Title	Length
1.	"Need You Now"	3:32

Acoustic version
No.	Title	Length
1.	"Need You Now"	3:23

== Charts ==
Chart (2017)	Peak Position
Australian Artists (ARIA)	10

== Certifications ==
Region	Certification	Certified units/sales
Australia (ARIA)	2× Platinum	140,000^{‡}
Canada (Music Canada)	Gold	40,000^{‡}
Denmark (IFPI Danmark)	Gold	45,000^{‡}
New Zealand (RMNZ)	Gold	15,000^{‡}
United Kingdom (BPI)	Silver	200,000^{‡}
Streaming
Sweden (GLF)	Gold	4,000,000^{†}
^{‡} Sales+streaming figures based on certification alone.^{†} Streaming-only figures based on certification alone.

== Release history ==
Country	Release date	Format	Label
Australia	7 April 2017	Digital download; streaming	Island Australia; Universal Australia
