= Be Alright (Dean Lewis song) =

Single by Dean Lewis

from the album A Place We Knew
- Released: 29 June 2018
- Length: 3:16
- Label: Island Australia; Universal Australia
- Songwriters: Dean Lewis; Jon Hume
- Producers: Lewis; Nick Atkinson; Edd Holloway

Dean Lewis singles chronology
"Chemicals" (2018)	"Be Alright" (2018)	"7 Minutes" (2019)

Music video
- "Be Alright" on YouTube

"Be Alright" is a song by Australian singer and songwriter Dean Lewis. The song was released in June 2018 as the lead single from Lewis' debut studio album, A Place We Knew. It reached number one and is certified 10× Platinum in Australia and multi platinum worldwide, including 5× Platinum in the United States. An acoustic single was released on 7 September 2018.

About the song, Lewis said: "'Be Alright' is actually written about a few different relationships, some were mine and some from friends, I took little bits and pieces from each experience and combined them into one song." He added: "For people worried about me cause the song's so sad — trust me I'm OK… the song is actually about hope and knowing that in the end things will work out, surrounding yourself with good people." Lyrically, the song is about dealing with a breakup and the reality that you have to move on.

At the ARIA Music Awards of 2018, "Be Alright" was nominated for four awards, winning the ARIA Award for Best Video. At the APRA Music Awards of 2019, the song was nominated for Pop Work of the Year. At the APRA Music Awards of 2021, the song won Most Performed Australian Work Overseas.

== Music video ==
The music video for "Be Alright" was shot in Mexico City and directed by Los Angeles-based, Australian director Jessie Hill and features Mexican actor Maria Evoli as Lewis' love interest. The video was released on 12 July 2018.

== Reception ==
Allison Gallagher from The Brag Magazine called the song "stunning" and "gut-wrenching", saying, "A frank and fairly candid meditation on romantic betrayal and moving past pain, Lewis delivers his lyrics above a relatively sparse, stripped back instrumentation. Punctuated with a swelling, hopeful chorus, 'Be Alright' is the kind of slow-burning balladry that's equal parts uplifting and devastating." RJ Frometa from Vents Magazine said, "[Lewis] perfectly captures gut-wrenching heartbreak that comes with the hardships of a break-up. But while it deals candidly with anguish, the chorus swells with hope; a recognition that this pain is only temporary." auspOp called the song "a cracker", adding that "Be Alright" "feels like a big, bold step up."

== Other versions ==
The New Zealand sketch comedy group, Viva La Dirt League, produced a music video parody of the song on YouTube titled, "Loot Lust". The song, which references the video game PUBG, has over 1.5 million views and features lead vocals from VLDL member Rowan Bettjeman. The song has also been covered by music artists such as Amy Shark and Anson Seabra.

== Track listing ==
No.	Title	Length
1.	"Be Alright"	3:16

Acoustic single
No.	Title	Length
1.	"Be Alright" (acoustic)	3:17
2.	"Be Alright" (guitar acoustic)	3:17
3.	"Be Alright"	3:16

== Charts ==
=== Weekly charts ===
Weekly chart performance for "Be Alright"
Chart (2018–2019)	Peak position
Australia (ARIA)	1
Austria (Ö3 Austria Top 40)	7
Belgium (Ultratop 50 Flanders)	1
Belgium (Ultratop 50 Wallonia)	2
Canada Hot 100 (Billboard)	27
Canada AC (Billboard)	15
Canada CHR/Top 40 (Billboard)	38
Canada Hot AC (Billboard)	8
Croatia (HRT)	66
Czech Republic Airplay (ČNS IFPI)	1
Czech Republic Singles Digital (ČNS IFPI)	13
Denmark (Tracklisten)	5
France (SNEP)	34
Germany (GfK)	8
Hungary (Editors' Choice Top 40)	28
Hungary (Stream Top 40)	20
Ireland (IRMA)	4
Italy (FIMI)	57
Malaysia (RIM)	3
Netherlands (Dutch Top 40)	6
Netherlands (Single Top 100)	7
New Zealand (Recorded Music NZ)	3
Norway (VG-lista)	2
Poland Airplay (ZPAV)	7
Portugal (AFP)	35
Romania (Airplay 100)	52
Scottish Singles Sales (Official Charts)	16
Singapore (RIAS)	1
Slovakia Airplay (ČNS IFPI)	13
Slovakia Singles Digital (ČNS IFPI)	18
Slovenia (SloTop50)	11
Sweden (Sverigetopplistan)	2
Switzerland (Schweizer Hitparade)	6
UK Singles (Official Charts)	11
US Billboard Hot 100	23
US Adult Alternative Airplay (Billboard)	40
US Adult Contemporary (Billboard)	4
US Adult Pop Airplay (Billboard)	1
US Pop Airplay (Billboard)	11
US Dance Airplay (Billboard)	39

=== Year-end charts ===
2018 year-end chart performance for "Be Alright"
Chart (2018)	Position
Australia (ARIA)	4
Austria (Ö3 Austria Top 40)	44
Belgium (Ultratop Flanders)	29
Belgium (Ultratop Wallonia)	65
Denmark (Tracklisten)	33
Estonia (IFPI)	58
Germany (Official German Charts)	84
Iceland (Plötutíóindi)	43
Netherlands (Dutch Top 40)	40
Netherlands (Single Top 100)	44
New Zealand (Recorded Music NZ)	45
Portugal (AFP)	152
Sweden (Sverigetopplistan)	17
Switzerland (Schweizer Hitparade)	51

2019 year-end chart performance for "Be Alright"
Chart (2019)	Position
Australia (ARIA)	27
Belgium (Ultratop Flanders)	28
Belgium (Ultratop Wallonia)	52
Canada (Canadian Hot 100)	46
Denmark (Tracklisten)	22
France (SNEP)	80
Germany (Official German Charts)	66
Iceland (Tónlistinn)	17
Netherlands (Dutch Top 40)	70
Netherlands (Single Top 100)	70
New Zealand (Recorded Music NZ)	45
Portugal (AFP)	90
Slovenia (SloTop50)	31
Sweden (Sverigetopplistan)	37
Switzerland (Schweizer Hitparade)	46
US Billboard Hot 100	54
US Adult Contemporary (Billboard)	8
US Adult Top 40 (Billboard)	12
US Mainstream Top 40 (Billboard)	31
US Rolling Stone Top 100	61

2020 year-end chart performance for "Be Alright"
Chart (2020)	Position
Australia (ARIA)	67
Denmark (Tracklisten)	85

2021 year-end chart performance for "Be Alright"
Chart (2021)	Position
Australia (ARIA)	80

2022 year-end chart performance for "Be Alright"
Chart (2022)	Position
Australia (ARIA)	77
Denmark (Tracklisten)	60

=== Decade-end charts ===
Decade-end chart performance for "Be Alright"
Chart (2010–2019)	Position
Australia (ARIA)	64
Australian Artist Singles (ARIA)	7

== Certifications ==
Certifications for "Be Alright"
Region	Certification	Certified units/sales
Australia (ARIA)	16× Platinum	1,120,000^{‡}
Austria (IFPI Austria)	Platinum	30,000^{‡}
Belgium (BRMA)	2× Platinum	80,000^{‡}
Brazil (Pro-Música Brasil)	Diamond	160,000^{‡}
Canada (Music Canada)	9× Platinum	720,000^{‡}
Denmark (IFPI Danmark)	5× Platinum	450,000^{‡}
France (SNEP)	Diamond	333,333^{‡}
Germany (BVMI)	3× Gold	900,000^{‡}
Italy (FIMI)	Platinum	50,000^{‡}
Netherlands (NVPI)	2× Platinum	160,000^{‡}
New Zealand (RMNZ)	7× Platinum	210,000^{‡}
Norway (IFPI Norway)	6× Platinum	360,000^{‡}
Poland (ZPAV)	3× Platinum	150,000^{‡}
Portugal (AFP)	2× Platinum	20,000^{‡}
Spain (Promusicae)	Platinum	60,000^{‡}
United Kingdom (BPI)	3× Platinum	1,800,000^{‡}
United States (RIAA)	5× Platinum	5,000,000^{‡}
Streaming
Sweden (GLF)	7× Platinum	56,000,000^{†}
^{‡} Sales+streaming figures based on certification alone.^{†} Streaming-only figures based on certification alone.

== Release history ==
Country	Release date	Format	Label
Australia	29 June 2018	Digital download; streaming	Island Australia; Universal Australia

== See also ==
- List of best-selling singles in Australia
- List of number-one singles of 2018 (Australia)
- List of number-one songs of 2018 (Singapore)
