= The Epilogue (album) =

Studio album by Dean Lewis
- Released: 18 October 2024
- Length: 37:10
- Label: Island
- Producer: Afterhrs; Nick Atkinson; Alex Borel; Peter Fenn; Colin Foote; Edd Holloway; Jon Hume; Jon Levine; Dean Lewis; Petey Martin; Sarcastic Sounds; Steve Solomon

Dean Lewis chronology
The Hardest Love (2022)	The Epilogue (2024)

Singles from The Epilogue
- 1. "Trust Me Mate" Released: 29 September 2023; 2. "Memories" Released: 2 February 2024; 3. "The Last Bit of Us" Released: 29 March 2024; 4. "All I Ever Wanted" Released: 3 May 2024; 5. "Rest" Released: 9 August 2024; 6. "Empire" Released: 14 October 2024

Singles from The Epilogue (Deluxe)
- 1. "With You" Released: 9 January 2025; 2. "I Hate That it's True" Released: 11 April 2025; 3. "Truth" Released: 30 May 2025

The Epilogue is the third studio album by Australian singer and songwriter Dean Lewis, released on 18 October 2024. The album was written and recorded in-between Lewis' overseas live touring schedule.

Speaking about the album, Lewis said, "An Epilogue traditionally sums up a book, answers any unanswered questions, and hints at what's to come. This is a new chapter. It feels like the ending of the last few years of my life and the beginning of the next. I really tried to define my own style. For me, the music wraps up the past and shines a light on what to expect going forward."

A deluxe edition of the album was released on 11 July 2025.

== Background ==
The album was announced in June 2024 with Lewis saying "My first album had a level of rawness. For the second, I was a little more cautious and pop-oriented, but the songs were meaningful to me. On this record, I started to get rawer and more acoustic again. I was trying to rekindle the simplicity of why things worked. I knew what I wanted to hear, so I embraced what made the first one special."

The album was supported by The Epilogue Australian tour commencing in Newcastle, New South Wales on 30 October 2024.

The album was supported by World Tour (outside of Australia) in 2025.

== Critical reception ==
Jo Forrest from Total Ntertainment said "Dean continues to write and perform with unmatched vulnerability, vibrancy, and vitality. As such, The Epilogue, represents both the culmination of an incredible journey thus far and a harbinger for where he may go next."

== Track listing ==
The Epilogue track listing
No.	Title	Writer(s)	Producer(s)	Length
1.	"Empire"	Dean Lewis; Jeremy Fedryk; Hayden Robert Hubers	Lewis; Sarcastic Sounds	3:04
2.	"All I Ever Wanted"	Lewis; Ian Franzino; Andrew Haas	Lewis; Afterhrs	3:09
3.	"Rest" (with Sasha Alex Sloan)	Lewis; Sasha Alex Sloan	Lewis; Alex Borel; Colin Foote; Petey Martin	3:13
4.	"All Your Lies"	Lewis; Nick Atkinson; Edd Holloway	Lewis; Atkinson; Holloway	3:13
5.	"I Still Do"	Lewis; Andy Grammer; Jon Levine	Lewis; Levine	3:05
6.	"Cold"	Lewis; Peter Fenn	Lewis; Fenn	2:51
7.	"Memories"	Lewis; Jon Hume	Lewis; Hume	2:59
8.	"Trust Me Mate"	Lewis; Hume	Lewis; Hume	2:58
9.	"Love of My Life"	Lewis	Lewis; Borel; Foote; Dylan Nash^{[a]}	3:01
10.	"Until the End"	Lewis; Borel; Adeliz Calderon; Foote	Lewis; Borel; Foote	3:03
11.	"Clélia's Song"	Lewis; Steve Solomon	Lewis; Solomon	3:14
12.	"The Last Bit of Us"	Lewis; Borel; Foote; Hayley Warner	Lewis; Borel; Foote; Nash^{[a]}	3:20
Total length:				37:10

The Epilogue (Deluxe) track listing
No.	Title	Writer(s)	Producer(s)	Length
1.	"With You"	Lewis; Mikky Ekko; Tommy English; Justin Parker; Emma Rosen	Lewis; Borel; English; Foote	3:09
2.	"I Hate That it's True"	Lewis; Anthony Egizzi; David Musumeci	Lewis; DNA Sounds	2:41
3.	"Truth"	Lewis; Atkinson; Holloway	Lewis; Atkinson; Holloway	3:27
4.	"Hurt So Bad"	Lewis; Pom Pom; Gregg Wattenberg	Lewis; Pom Pom; Gregg Wattenberg	3:06
5.	"Iris"	John Rzeznik	Lewis; Jake Gray	2:30

Note

- ^{^[a]} signifies an additional producer.

== Personnel ==
Musicians

- Dean Lewis – vocals (all tracks), acoustic guitar (tracks 1–6, 8, 9, 11, 12), background vocals (2), piano (7, 8, 10)
- Jeremy Fedyrk – acoustic guitar, background vocals, bass, drum programming (track 1)
- Hayden Robert Hubers – acoustic guitar, background vocals (track 1)
- Andrew Haas – background vocals, bass, drums, electric guitar, keyboards, programming, synthesizer, ukulele (track 2)
- Ian Franzino – background vocals, drums, programming, synthesizer (track 2)
- Alex Borel – bass, piano, synthesizer (tracks 3, 9, 10, 12); piano (3, 9, 10, 12), strings (3, 10), background vocals (10)
- Colin Foote – bass, synthesizer (tracks 3, 9, 10, 12); strings (3, 10), electric guitar (9, 12), background vocals (10)
- Sasha Alex Sloan – vocals (track 3)
- Edd Holloway – background vocals, bass, drum programming, electric guitar, piano, synthesizer (track 4)
- Nick Atkinson – background vocals, synthesizer (track 4)
- Jon Levine – bass, drum programming, piano, synthesizer (track 5)
- Peter Fenn – acoustic guitar, background vocals, bass, drum programming, electric guitar, keyboards (track 6)
- Jon Hume – background vocals, bass, piano (tracks 7, 8); drum programming, electric guitar (8)
- Lev Freedman – acoustic guitar (track 9)
- Dylan Nash – drum programming (track 9)
- Steve Solomon – bass, drum programming, electric guitar, keyboards, synthesizer (track 11)
- Leigh Fisher – drums (track 12)
- Hayley Warner – ukulele (track 12)

Technical

- Eric Bard – mastering (tracks 1–6, 9, 10)
- Jon Hume – mastering, mixing (track 7)
- Robert Vosgien – mastering (track 8)
- Randy Merrill – mastering (track 12)
- Mark "Spike" Stent – mixing (tracks 1–4, 8–10, 12)
- Mitch McCarthy – mixing (track 5)
- Peter Fenn – mixing (track 6)
- Michael Freeman – mixing (track 11)
- Andrew Haas – engineering (track 2)
- Ian Franzino – engineering (track 2)
- Jeff Gunnell – engineering (track 2)
- Miguel Gutiérrez – engineering (track 3)
- Lily Honiberg – string arrangement (track 6)
- Alex Borel – string arrangement (tracks 9, 11, 12)
- Colin Foote – string arrangement (tracks 9, 11, 12)
- Liam Quinn – string arrangement (track 9)

== Charts ==
=== Weekly charts ===
Weekly chart performance for The Epilogue
Chart (2024)	Peak position
Australian Albums (ARIA)	2
Austrian Albums (Ö3 Austria)	66
Belgian Albums (Ultratop Flanders)	44
Dutch Albums (Album Top 100)	17
German Albums (Offizielle Top 100)	66
Swiss Albums (Schweizer Hitparade)	18
UK Album Downloads (OCC)	19

=== Year-end charts ===
2024 year-end chart performance for The Epilogue
Chart (2024)	Position
Australian Artist Albums (ARIA)	18
Chart (2025)	Position
Australian Artist Albums (ARIA)	12
