= Waves (Dean Lewis song) =

2016 debut single by Dean Lewis

Single by Dean Lewis

from the EP Same Kind of Different
- Released: 30 September 2016
- Length: 4:01
- Label: Island Australia; Universal Australia
- Songwriters: Dean Lewis; Nick Atkinson; Edd Holloway
- Producers: Atkinson; Holloway

Dean Lewis singles chronology
"Waves" (2016)	"Need You Now" (2017)

Music videos
- "Waves" on YouTube; "Waves" (Timbaland remix) on YouTube

Alternative cover
- Acoustic version

"Waves" is the debut single by Australian singer and songwriter Dean Lewis. Released in September 2016 as the lead single from his debut extended play Same Kind of Different (2017).

In an interview with Stack Magazine in May 2017, Lewis explained: "A lot of people think it's about relationships, but it's more about how with every year [that] passes, life gets a little bit less exciting. I was in London a year ago and a few music things were happening, and I'm like 'Why am I not really enjoying my life? Like, this is cool!' Then I remembered when I was 15 and you'd go to a house party and you'd be so excited, or going to the movies with your friends. Where has that feeling gone?"

An acoustic version was released on 3 February 2017.

In March 2019 it was included on Lewis' first full-length album A Place We Knew.

Remixes were released on 26 July 2019.

The song appeared in episode four of series one of Riverdale, episode 10 of series seven of Suits, in episode 12 of series two of Shadowhunters: The Mortal Instruments, the season 1 finale of Magnum P.I. (2018 TV series) and the season 2 premiere of All American.

At the ARIA Music Awards of 2017, the song was nominated for five awards, including Best Pop Release, Breakthrough Artist and Song of the Year.

At the APRA Music Awards of 2018, the song was nominated for two awards; Pop Work of the Year and Most Played Australian Work.

== Music video ==
The music video for "Waves" was directed by Mick Jones and released on 20 October 2016. It was nominated for Best Video at the ARIA Music Awards of 2017.

== Track listing ==
No.	Title	Length
1.	"Waves"	4:01

Acoustic version
No.	Title	Length
1.	"Waves"	4:08

Acoustic guitar version
No.	Title	Length
1.	"Waves"	4:08

Waves Remixes
No.	Title	Length
1.	"Waves" (Timbaland vs.RudyWade remix)	3:57
2.	"Waves"	4:00
3.	"Waves" (Live at the Forum)	4:40
4.	"Waves" (acoustic)	4:08
5.	"Waves" (guitar acoustic)	4:08

== Charts ==
=== Weekly charts ===
Chart (2016–2020)	Peak position
Australia (ARIA)	12
Australian Artist Singles (ARIA)	1
Belgium (Ultratip Bubbling Under Flanders)	2
Belgium (Ultratop 50 Wallonia)	38
Czech Republic Airplay (ČNS IFPI) Timbaland remix	8
Ireland (IRMA)	97
Scottish Singles Sales (Official Charts)	75
US Adult Pop Airplay (Billboard)	21
US Hot Rock & Alternative Songs (Billboard)	38

=== Year-end charts ===
Chart (2017)	Position
Australia (ARIA)	34

== Certifications ==
Region	Certification	Certified units/sales
Australia (ARIA)	11× Platinum	770,000^{‡}
Brazil (Pro-Música Brasil)	Platinum	60,000^{‡}
Canada (Music Canada)	4× Platinum	320,000^{‡}
Denmark (IFPI Danmark)	Platinum	90,000^{‡}
France (SNEP)	Platinum	200,000^{‡}
Germany (BVMI)	Platinum	400,000^{‡}
Italy (FIMI)	Gold	35,000^{‡}
New Zealand (RMNZ)	3× Platinum	90,000^{‡}
Norway (IFPI Norway)	2× Platinum	120,000^{‡}
Poland (ZPAV)	Platinum	20,000^{‡}
Portugal (AFP)	Platinum	10,000^{‡}
Spain (Promusicae)	Gold	30,000^{‡}
United Kingdom (BPI)	Platinum	600,000^{‡}
United States (RIAA)	Platinum	1,000,000^{‡}
Streaming
Sweden (GLF)	2× Platinum	16,000,000^{†}
^{‡} Sales+streaming figures based on certification alone.^{†} Streaming-only figures based on certification alone.

== Release history ==
Country	Release date	Format	Label
Australia	30 September 2016	Digital download	Island Australia; Universal Australia

== Sheppard version ==
"Waves"

Single by Sheppard

from the album Undercover
- Released: 1 December 2017
- Length: 4:37
- Label: Universal Australia
- Songwriters: Dean Lewis; Nick Atkinson; Edd Holloway

Sheppard singles chronology
"Coming Home" (2017)	"Waves" (2017)	"Riding the Wave" (2018)

Audio video
- "Waves" on YouTube

Australian group Sheppard released a cover on 1 December 2017 as the lead single from their second extended play Undercover. Upon release, Sheppard said "We present to you our cover of "Waves". This was one of our favourite Australian songs of the year and Dean has been a friend of the band for a long time now. Congrats on everything Dean. We hope we’ve done it justice."

== See also ==
- List of highest-certified singles in Australia
