= Looks Like Me =

Single by Dean Lewis

from the album The Hardest Love
- Released: 21 October 2021
- Length: 3:10
- Label: Island Australia; Universal Australia
- Songwriters: Dean Lewis; Jake Torrey; Sean Wiliam; William Lobban-Bean; Siregar
- Producers: Dean Lewis; Edd Holloway; Nick Atkinson; Cook Classics

Dean Lewis singles chronology
"Falling Up" (2021)	"Looks Like Me" (2021)	"Hurtless" (2022)

Music video
- "Looks Like Me" on YouTube

"Looks Like Me" is a song by Australian singer and songwriter Dean Lewis. The song was released on 21 October 2021 as the lead single from Lewis' forthcoming second studio album, The Hardest Love (2022).

Speaking of the track, Lewis said the song is "inspired by a personal relationship", saying "It was just one of those relationships that never quite came together – no matter how much I wanted it to. One night on the phone, we were living in different cities, she told me she was hanging with a guy who looked like me". In retrospect, Lewis says he can look back on the experience with "a sense of humour" posing, "So you'd rather be with someone who looks like me – than the 'actual' me!"

== Music video ==
The official video was filmed in Nashville with Director Tim Mattia.

== Track listings ==
Digital download / streaming
No.	Title	Length
1.	"Looks Like Me"	3:10

Acoustic Digital download / streaming
No.	Title	Length
1.	"Looks Like Me" (Piano Acoustic version)	3:05
2.	"Looks Like Me" (Guitar Acoustic version)	3:18

== Charts ==
Chart performance for "Looks Like Me"
Chart (2021)	Peak position
Australia (ARIA)	82
New Zealand Hot Singles (RMNZ)	17

== Certifications ==
Certifications for "Looks Like Me"
Region	Certification	Certified units/sales
Australia (ARIA)	Platinum	70,000^{‡}
Canada (Music Canada)	Gold	40,000^{‡}
^{‡} Sales+streaming figures based on certification alone.
