= Hurtless =

Single by Dean Lewis

from the album The Hardest Love
- Released: 1 April 2022
- Length: 3:00
- Label: Island Australia; Universal Australia
- Songwriters: Dean Lewis; Jon Hume
- Producers: Dean Lewis; Jon Hume

Dean Lewis singles chronology
"Looks Like Me" (2021)	"Hurtless" (2022)	"Never Really Loved Me" (2022)

Music video
- "Hurtless" on YouTube

"Hurtless" is a song by Australian singer and songwriter Dean Lewis. The song was released on 1 April 2022 as the second single from Lewis' forthcoming second studio album, The Hardest Love.

In a statement, Lewis said "You know when you plan your entire life out with someone, you see your future with that person, then all of a sudden one night, they do something and from that point on, you realise they are not the person you thought they were? All your plans for the future aren't going to happen and you're back to just being with yourself."

At the 2022 ARIA Music Awards, the song was nominated for Song of the Year.

At the APRA Music Awards of 2023, the song was nominated for Most Performed Australian Work of the Year and won Most Performed Alternate Work of the Year.

== Music video ==
The official video was directed by James Fitzgerald, was filmed in Ireland and features actors Frank Blake and Stephanie Dufresne.

== Charts ==
=== Weekly charts ===
Weekly chart performance for "Hurtless"
Chart (2022)	Peak position
Australia (ARIA)	29
Canada Hot 100 (Billboard)	100
Denmark (Tracklisten)	8
Ireland (IRMA)	75
New Zealand Hot Singles (RMNZ)	7
Sweden Heatseeker (Sverigetopplistan)	1

=== Year-end charts ===
Year-end chart performance for "Hurtless"
Chart (2022)	Position
Denmark (Tracklisten)	75

== Certifications ==
Certifications for "Hurtless"
Region	Certification	Certified units/sales
Australia (ARIA)	2× Platinum	140,000^{‡}
Canada (Music Canada)	Gold	40,000^{‡}
Denmark (IFPI Danmark)	Platinum	90,000^{‡}
New Zealand (RMNZ)	Gold	15,000^{‡}
United Kingdom (BPI)	Silver	200,000^{‡}
^{‡} Sales+streaming figures based on certification alone.
