= Falling Up (Dean Lewis song) =

Single by Dean Lewis
- Released: 5 March 2021
- Length: 3:26
- Label: Island Australia; Universal Australia
- Songwriters: Benjamin Alexander Kohn; Pete Kellegher; Phil Plested; Tom Barnes; Dean Lewis; Hayden Halnin
- Producers: TMS; Dean Lewis; Edd Holloway; Dylan Nash

Dean Lewis singles chronology
"Used to Love" (2019)	"Falling Up" (2021)	"Looks Like Me" (2021)

Music video
- "Falling Up" on YouTube

"Falling Up" is a song by Australian singer and songwriter Dean Lewis. The song was released on 5 March 2021.

In writing the song, Lewis tuned into lifelong feelings of frustration and anxiety, saying "I always thought I would be happy when I finished school or when I passed an exam, or I got a job or a promotion or if I went travelling and then I was like – 'ooh, now I have a record deal, what if I have a big song?'. Then, I had a big song, and I was on the road for three years and when I stopped, I realised it had all passed me by and I was actually less present and more anxious and stressed than ever. I looked back on my life and at all of these points along the way and I realised that I've never felt any better, it's always been onto the next thing, always moving."

At the 2021 ARIA Music Awards, the song was nominated for Song of the Year.

At the APRA Music Awards of 2022, the song was nominated for Most Performed Alternative Work.

== Critical reception ==
Total Ntertainment described the song as "Emotive, impactful, relatable and impossible to forget, it's a masterclass in what the songwriter does best: connect."

== Track listings ==
Digital download / streaming
No.	Title	Length
1.	"Falling Up"	3:26

Digital download / streaming
No.	Title	Length
1.	"Falling Up" (Piano Acoustic version)	3:18

Acoustic Digital download / streaming
No.	Title	Length
1.	"Falling Up" (Piano Acoustic version)	3:18
2.	"Falling Up" (Guitar Acoustic version)	3:16

== Charts ==
=== Weekly charts ===
Chart performance for "Falling Up"
Chart (2021)	Peak position
Australia (ARIA)	48
Czech Republic Airplay (ČNS IFPI)	18
New Zealand Hot Singles (RMNZ)	12

=== Year-end charts ===
Chart (2021)	Position
Australian Artist (ARIA)	26

== Certifications ==
Region	Certification	Certified units/sales
Australia (ARIA)	Platinum	70,000^{‡}
^{‡} Sales+streaming figures based on certification alone.
