= How Do I Say Goodbye =

Single by Dean Lewis

from the album The Hardest Love
- Released: 2 September 2022
- Length: 2:43
- Label: Island Australia; Universal Australia
- Songwriters: Dean Lewis; Jon Hume
- Producers: Dean Lewis; Jon Hume; Edd Holloway; Nick Atkinson

Dean Lewis singles chronology
"Lost Without You" (2022)	"How Do I Say Goodbye" (2022)	"Trust Me Mate" (2023)

Music video
- "How Do I Say Goodbye" on YouTube

"How Do I Say Goodbye" is a song by Australian singer and songwriter Dean Lewis. The song was released on 2 September 2022 as the third single from Lewis's second studio album, The Hardest Love.

At the 2023 ARIA Music Awards, the song was nominated for Song of the Year.

At the APRA Music Awards of 2024, the song won Most Performed Australian Work and Most Performed Pop Work.

== Background ==
Lewis wrote the song for his father, who was diagnosed with cancer in 2019. Dean Lewis later said, "Although I wrote the song about my dad, my dad ended up being okay. I wrote the song assuming I was gonna have to say goodbye, and I didn't have to. My dad got a stem cell transplant and his cancer was an aggressive form of pre-leukemia, and he had a very small percentage chance of getting out of it."

== Music video ==
The official video was directed by Sean Loaney (Lewis's brother) and premiered on 6 September 2022. The music video features footage taken by Lewis's father during the singer's childhood.

== Track listings ==
Digital download / streaming
No.	Title	Length
1.	"How Do I Say Goodbye"	2:43

Digital download / streaming
No.	Title	Length
1.	"How Do I Say Goodbye" (Chuksie remix)	3:13

Digital download / streaming
No.	Title	Length
1.	"How Do I Say Goodbye" (Acoustic version)	2:44

== Charts ==
=== Weekly charts ===
Weekly chart performance for "How Do I Say Goodbye"
Chart (2022–2023)	Peak position
Australia (ARIA)	14
Austria (Ö3 Austria Top 40)	14
Belgium (Ultratop 50 Flanders)	5
Belgium (Ultratop 50 Wallonia)	38
Canada Hot 100 (Billboard)	42
Canada AC (Billboard)	24
Canada CHR/Top 40 (Billboard)	49
Canada Hot AC (Billboard)	20
Czech Republic Airplay (ČNS IFPI)	96
Czech Republic Singles Digital (ČNS IFPI)	42
Denmark (Tracklisten)	7
Germany (GfK)	24
Global 200 (Billboard)	82
Ireland (IRMA)	16
Netherlands (Dutch Top 40)	3
Netherlands (Single Top 100)	8
New Zealand (Recorded Music NZ)	40
Norway (VG-lista)	5
Portugal (AFP)	88
San Marino Airplay (SMRTV Top 50)	27
Slovakia Singles Digital (ČNS IFPI)	70
Sweden (Sverigetopplistan)	19
Switzerland (Schweizer Hitparade)	7
UK Singles (Official Charts)	23
US Bubbling Under Hot 100 (Billboard)	5
US Adult Contemporary (Billboard)	23
US Adult Pop Airplay (Billboard)	3

=== Year-end charts ===
2022 year-end chart performance for "How Do I Say Goodbye"
Chart (2022)	Position
Australian Artist (ARIA)	28
Belgium (Ultratop 50 Flanders)	111
Denmark (Tracklisten)	99
Netherlands (Dutch Top 40)	36
Netherlands (Single Top 100)	60
Switzerland (Schweizer Hitparade)	69

2023 year-end chart performance for "How Do I Say Goodbye"
Chart (2023)	Position
Australia (ARIA)	68
Belgium (Ultratop 50 Flanders)	27
Denmark (Tracklisten)	49
Netherlands (Dutch Top 40)	81
Netherlands (Single Top 100)	40
Switzerland (Schweizer Hitparade)	59
US Adult Contemporary (Billboard)	43
US Adult Top 40 (Billboard)	7

2024 year-end chart performance for "How Do I Say Goodbye"
Chart (2024)	Position
Australian Artist (ARIA)	24

2025 year-end chart performance for "How Do I Say Goodbye"
Chart (2025)	Position
Australian Artist (ARIA)	28

== Certifications ==
Certifications for "How Do I Say Goodbye"
Region	Certification	Certified units/sales
Australia (ARIA)	4× Platinum	280,000^{‡}
Austria (IFPI Austria)	Gold	15,000^{‡}
Belgium (BRMA)	Platinum	40,000^{‡}
Brazil (Pro-Música Brasil)	Platinum	40,000^{‡}
Canada (Music Canada)	2× Platinum	160,000^{‡}
Denmark (IFPI Danmark)	2× Platinum	180,000^{‡}
France (SNEP)	Platinum	200,000^{‡}
Germany (BVMI)	Gold	200,000^{‡}
Italy (FIMI)	Gold	50,000^{‡}
New Zealand (RMNZ)	2× Platinum	60,000^{‡}
Poland (ZPAV)	Gold	25,000^{‡}
Spain (Promusicae)	Gold	30,000^{‡}
Switzerland (IFPI Switzerland)	Platinum	20,000^{‡}
United Kingdom (BPI)	Platinum	600,000^{‡}
Streaming
Sweden (GLF)	Platinum	8,000,000^{†}
^{‡} Sales+streaming figures based on certification alone.^{†} Streaming-only figures based on certification alone.
