= The Hardest Love =

Studio album by Dean Lewis
- Released: 4 November 2022
- Length: 31:06
- Label: Island
- Producer: Dean Lewis; Alex Hope; Cook Classics; Dylan Nash; Edd Holloway; Jon Hume; Nicholas Atkinson; Tyler Johnson; Doug Showalter

Dean Lewis chronology
A Place We Knew (2019)	The Hardest Love (2022)	The Epilogue (2024)

Singles from The Hardest Love
- 1. "Looks Like Me" Released: 21 October 2021; 2. "Hurtless" Released: 1 April 2022; 3. "How Do I Say Goodbye" Released: 2 September 2022

The Hardest Love is the second studio album by Australian singer and songwriter Dean Lewis, released on 4 November 2022. It was initially announced on 2 September 2022 for release on 7 October 2022 before being delayed.

Lewis experimented with various producers on the album and upon release, explained the lengthy creation process: "I started writing the album in this hotel on Sunset in West Hollywood. I wrote in Nashville for a while, then I came back to LA and then went to London... there's a famous quote that says people have their whole life to write their first album, and then six months to write the next one. I feel like I've had double the amount of time for this album than the first one."

The album cover is a photo taken by Darren Craig, taken at night in Los Angeles.

== Critical reception ==
Professional ratings
Review scores
Source	Rating
The Voice of London	3.5/5 stars

The Voice of London said "Dean Lewis uses his music to strip his soul bare for everyone to see. It is beautiful and something he does incredibly as an artist. While it has a similar feel to his debut, this album will connect with people worldwide, bringing both pain and comfort to many." They also noted "While on his first album he focused more around romance, here there is a heavy theme of death, grief and his deepest anxieties."

Chantal Dalebroux from U Music said "The album is a haze of heartbreak, tumultuous times and relatability."

== Track listing ==
The Hardest Love track listing
No.	Title	Writer(s)	Producer(s)	Length
1.	"Small Disasters"	Dean Lewis; Jon Hume	Dean Lewis; Nicholas Atkinson; Edd Holloway	3:18
2.	"Looks Like Me"	Lewis; Jake Torrey; Sean Wiliam; William Lobban-Bean	Lewis; Atkinson; Holloway; Cook Classics	3:10
3.	"The Hardest Love"	Lewis; Dylan Nash	Lewis; Nash; Tyler Johnson; Doug Showalter	4:04
4.	"Hurtless"	Lewis; Jon Hume	Lewis; J. Hume	3:00
5.	"All for You"	Lewis	Lewis; Nash	3:45
6.	"How Do I Say Goodbye"	Lewis; J. Hume	Lewis; Atkinson; Holloway; J. Hume	2:43
7.	"Scares Me"	Lewis; Alex Hope; Wrabel	Lewis; Hope	3:02
8.	"Something to Help"	Lewis; Johnson	Lewis; Johnson	2:38
9.	"Into the Breeze"	Lewis	Lewis; Nash	2:45
10.	"To Have You Today"	Lewis	Lewis; Nash	2:41
Total length:				31:06

== Charts ==
Chart performance for The Hardest Love
Chart (2022)	Peak position
Australian Albums (ARIA)	4
Belgian Albums (Ultratop Flanders)	51
Canadian Albums (Billboard)	60
Danish Albums (Hitlisten)	37
Dutch Albums (Album Top 100)	28
German Albums (Offizielle Top 100)	56
Swedish Albums (Sverigetopplistan)	48
Swiss Albums (Schweizer Hitparade)	33
UK Album Downloads (OCC)	13

== Certifications ==
Certifications for The Hardest Love
Region	Certification	Certified units/sales
Canada (Music Canada)	Gold	40,000^{‡}
Denmark (IFPI Danmark)	Gold	10,000^{‡}
New Zealand (RMNZ)	Gold	7,500^{‡}
^{‡} Sales+streaming figures based on certification alone.
