= Same Kind of Different =

EP by Dean Lewis
- Released: 12 May 2017
- Genre: Indie pop; pop
- Length: 20:29
- Label: Island Australia; Universal Australia
- Producer: Edd Holloway; John Castle; Nick Atkinson; Brad Mair

Dean Lewis chronology
Same Kind of Different (2017)	A Place We Knew (2019)

Singles from Same Kind of Different
- 1. "Waves" Released: 30 September 2016; 2. "Need You Now" Released: 7 April 2017; 3. "Lose My Mind" Released: 28 July 2017; 4. "Chemicals" Released: 23 March 2018

Same Kind of Different is the debut extended play (EP) by Australian indie pop artist Dean Lewis. It was released on 12 May 2017.

In an interview with Stack Magazine, Lewis said "I go through phases when I'm writing songs; if I'm surging to that kind of music, I'm just keen to write songs like that. I think that there's a thread through them. But I've written 100 to 150 [songs] in the last two years so it was really tough choosing songs for the EP. And it's also hard because I don't want to give everything away too quickly. I kept the ones that I think will be better for the album. I'm really proud of the songs so I can't wait to put this EP out there."

The EP was supported with a "Lose My Mind" national tour throughout November and December 2017. The tour was announced in August 2017.

== Reception ==
Professional ratings
Review scores
Source	Rating
The Music	3/5 stars

Tim Kroenert of The Music said "Dean Lewis presents six largely acoustic-driven pop tracks that seem tailored for broad appeal. There are few surprises, just frank, personal lyrics delivered with emotional heft, like a less angsty James Blunt." adding "Lewis' skills as a pop melodist come to the fore on infectious single "Waves" and the vaguely menacing torch song "Lose My Mind"."

== Track listing ==
No.	Title	Writer(s)	Producer(s)	Length
1.	"Waves"	Lewis; Nick Atkinson; Edd Holloway	Atkinson; Holloway	4:01
2.	"Need You Now"	Lewis; Brad Mair; Matt Weedon; Theo Weedon; Alkemi	Mair; John Castle; Holloway	3:22
3.	"Let Go"	Lewis; Atkinson; Holloway	Atkinson; Holloway	2:54
4.	"Lose My Mind"	Lewis; Castle	Castle	3:20
5.	"Chemicals"	Lewis	Castle; Holloway^{[a]}	3:41
6.	"Adore"	Amy Billings; Mark Landon	Holloway	2:59
Total length:				20:29

Notes

- ^{^[a]} signifies an additional producer

== Charts ==
Chart (2017–18)	Peak position
Australian Albums (ARIA)	27
Australian Artist Albums (ARIA)	7
Irish Albums (IRMA)	91

== Certifications ==
Region	Certification	Certified units/sales
Australia (ARIA)	Gold	35,000^{‡}
New Zealand (RMNZ)	Gold	7,500^{‡}
United Kingdom (BPI)	Silver	60,000^{‡}
^{‡} Sales+streaming figures based on certification alone.

== Release history ==
Region	Date	Format(s)	Label	Catalogue
Australia	12 September 2017	CD; digital download	Island Australia; Universal Australia	5748685
