= Used to Love (Martin Garrix and Dean Lewis song) =

2019 song by Martin Garrix and Dean Lewis

Single by Martin Garrix and Dean Lewis
- Released: 31 October 2019
- Recorded: Summer 2019
- Studio: Amsterdam, Netherlands
- Genre: EDM; future bass
- Length: 3:56
- Label: Stmpd; Epic Amsterdam; Sony Netherlands
- Songwriters: Albin Nedler; Dean Lewis; Kristoffer Fogelmark; Martijn Garritsen
- Producer: Martin Garrix

Martin Garrix singles chronology
"Home" (2019)	"Used to Love" (2019)	"Hold On" (2019)

Dean Lewis singles chronology
"Straight Back Down" (2019)	"Used to Love" (2019)	"Falling Up" (2021)

Music video
- "Used to Love" on YouTube

"Used to Love" is a song by Dutch DJ and record producer Martin Garrix and Australian singer-songwriter Dean Lewis. It was written by Garrix, Lewis, Albin Nedler and Kristoffer Fogelmark, and produced by Garrix. The song was released for digital download and streaming as a single through Garrix's label Stmpd Rcrds, under exclusive license to Epic Amsterdam, a division of Sony Music Entertainment Netherlands, on 31 October 2019.

Recorded during the summer of 2019 in Amsterdam, "Used to Love" is an electronic dance music and future bass song that reached the top 10 of the Dutch Top 40, number 10 on the US Billboard Hot Dance/Electronic Songs chart and number 92 on the Canadian Hot 100. The song earned multiple gold certifications worldwide and received nominations for Most Performed Australian Work and Most Performed Dance Work at the APRA Music Awards of 2021.

== Background and composition ==
In May 2019, Garrix injured his ankle during his set at Omnia Nightclub in Las Vegas. Following a medical examination, doctors determined that surgery would be necessary. After the operation, the Dutch producer received a visit from his regular collaborator Albin Nedler, and the two completed the writing of "Used to Love" together while Garrix was still in his hospital bed.

After being discharged from the hospital, Dean Lewis travelled to Amsterdam, Netherlands, to finish writing the song that he had been co-writing remotely with Garrix. In the studio, Lewis's voice was hoarse, as he had just finished a long tour. Since he served as both vocalist and guitarist on the track, the pair decided to begin by recording the guitar parts and to dedicate the second day to vocals, giving Lewis's voice time to recover. Because Lewis was unable to perform the guitar line of "Used to Love" to his satisfaction, a session guitarist was eventually brought in to record it. To complement the song's instrumentation, Garrix enlisted Dutch multi-instrumentalist Frank van Essen to record all the string sections. Van Essen replaced the computer-generated layers with live recordings of first and second violins, viola, and other string instruments, which were later combined to create the texture of a full orchestra.

In total, Garrix and Lewis spent several weeks in an Amsterdam studio during the summer of 2019 to finalise the song.

By the end of 2019, Garrix revealed the story of writing and recording "Used to Love" through the fourth season of The Martin Garrix Show, which documented the artists' studio sessions in Amsterdam and also showed their first meeting.

"Used to Love" was written by Martin Garrix (Martijn Garritsen), Dean Lewis, Albin Nedler and Kristoffer Fogelmark, with production handled by Garrix and co-production by Nedler. With a running time of three minutes and 56 seconds, it is an electronic dance music and future bass song incorporating elements of pop music. According to the official sheet music published by Musicnotes.com, the song is written in common time of 4/4 with a tempo of 120 beats per minute in the key of E major, while Lewis's vocals range from C♯_{4} to B_{5}.

== Release and promotion ==
In early September 2019, during Garrix's fifth anniversary set at Lollapalooza Berlin, the Dutch music producer announced that the song would be released at the end of October 2019, stating: "This track was made during my break while I was recovering from my ankle injury. Dean and I are super excited to share it with the world!"

Although no specific release date had been set at the time, it was reported a few days before the release that the song would come out on Halloween.

The song was released on 31 October 2019 for digital download and streaming as a single in various countries by Stmpd Rcrds, under exclusive license to Epic Amsterdam, a division of Sony Music Entertainment Netherlands. To accompany the release, the official music video premiered on Garrix's YouTube channel the same day, featuring Garrix and Lewis playing piano and guitar, respectively.

Upon the release, Lewis explained: "Since my career began, collaborations never felt like something I saw myself pursuing. As a song writer, who also sings, the entire concept just felt foreign. Until I met Martin. We spent about a week together locked behind closed doors in Amsterdam working on a song, which thought might end up be sung by someone else. But as the track progressed is started to sound a lot like me, but also very Martin. It's a real collaboration with a guy who's now become a great friend".

Lewis also noted that the chorus of "Used to Love" was "one of the highest vocal lines and most challenging singles he has ever worked on in that regard". Several recordings were made to achieve the right vocal balance and pitch without straining his voice. Garrix described the collaboration as an "amazing" experience and considered Lewis a "good friend and an exciting talent" with a "timeless" style and the ability to write "deeply personal lyrics".

An acoustic version of "Used to Love" was released on 14 February 2020 for digital download and streaming in various countries by Stmpd Rcrds, under exclusive license to Epic Amsterdam. Speaking about the release, Garrix said: "Super excited to finally release the acoustic version of "Used to Love". Dean is such a talent and writes deeply personal lyrics, which will carry out even more beautifully in this acoustic version". Lewis added: "I spent a week with [Garrix] in Amsterdam working on making this version feel as emotional and real as we could".

== Reception ==
=== Critical reception ===
Farrell Sweeney of Dancing Astronaut highlighted the combination of an "energy-building violin line" with "acoustic elements", making the song "vocal-led by Lewis's impassioned vocals". He also noted that Garrix, by releasing this type of track, was moving away from a strong emphasis on electronic music in favor of a subtler production style enhanced by acoustic sounds. Katie Bain of Billboard observed a tribute to American singer Bruce Springsteen in the song's lyrics, describing the song as swelling and compelling "in the same style as many of Springsteen's biggest and most grandiose hits" and characterizing Lewis's vocals as "soaring". Phil Scilippa of EDM.com emphasized the song's optimistic vibe despite its "nostalgic and sad" lyrics, calling the track "a future bass inspired sound" with "an uplifting vivacity" thanks to Lewis's piano parts and vocals, which give a "bright and summery feeling". Writing for Your EDM, Matthew Meadow noted that releasing this type of song on Halloween was "a bit of an odd choice". In his first review, he stated that Lewis's voice "never really stands out from the production", which itself "never really reaches any sort of crescendo". He also described the track as "usual Garrix fare" and compared it to his previous releases such as "No Sleep" and "There for You", while the melody of "Used to Love" was found "non-intrusive" with "quaint vocal chops".

The acoustic version received reviews from Dancing Astronaut and Your EDM. Rachel Narozniak of Dancing Astronaut described it as "an intimate alternative approach", featuring "poignant" piano chords that underscore the emotional quality of Lewis's voice. Karlie Powell of Your EDM described the composition as "void of all builds and drops", consisting only of piano, vocals, and some strings, which allowed the song's storytelling to be more prominent.

=== Commercial performance ===
In its first week, "Used to Love" accumulated ten million streams across all music platforms, and entered several European charts, including Ireland, the Netherlands, Sweden, and Switzerland. In Canada, the song debuted at number 92 on the Canadian Hot 100 dated 16 November 2019. In Garrix's home country, the Netherlands, the song peaked at number four on the airplay chart, and reached the top 10 of the Dutch Top 40, spending twenty weeks or more on both the Dutch and Flemish charts. (Note: "Used to Love" remained 20 weeks into the Dutch Top 40, 21 weeks into the Flemish Ultratop 50 chart, and 22 weeks into the Dutch Single Top 100.) In Lewis's home country, Australia, "Used to Love" debuted at number 83 on the ARIA Top 100 Singles Chart, reaching the top 50 in the week of 25 November 2019. The song earned gold certification from the Australian Recording Industry Association (ARIA) in less than three months, for selling more than 35,000 units or equivalent. (Note: Single figures can include "qualifying streams", according to Australian Recording Industry Association.)

In the United States, "Used to Love" did not enter any all-genre Billboard charts, but appeared on several dance/electronic charts. On the main Hot Dance/Electronic Songs chart, which combines sales, streaming and airplay data, (Note: According to Hot Dance/Electronic Songs.) the song debuted at number 10 and remained on the chart for twenty weeks. On other dance/electronic charts, which track a single type of data at a time, (Note: Either sales figures alone, nightclub figures alone, or airplay figures alone, according to Billboard charts.) it debuted at number three on the Dance Digital Song Sales, peaked at number three on Dance Club Songs and reached number 16 on Dance/Mix Show Airplay.

== Nominations ==
Year	Organization	Award	Result	Ref.
2021	APRA Music Awards	Most Performed Australian Work	Nominated	
2021	APRA Music Awards	Most Performed Dance Work	Nominated	

== Track listing ==
- Digital download and streaming
1. "Used to Love" – 3:56
- Digital download and streaming – Remixes
1. "Used to Love" (SWACQ Remix) – 3:40
2. "Used to Love" (Osrin & Beau Collins Remix) – 3:34
3. "Used to Love" (Jimi Hyde Remix) – 3:20
- Digital download and streaming – Acoustic version
1. "Used to Love" (Acoustic version) – 3:31

== Credits and personnel ==
Credits adapted from Tidal.

- Martin Garrix – production, composition, lyrics, guitar, master engineering, mix engineering
- Albin Nedler – co-production, composition, lyrics, backing vocals
- Dean Lewis – composition, lyrics, guitar
- Kristoffer Fogelmark – composition, lyrics
- Alex Bennison – guitar
- Eelco Bakker – drums
- Frank van Essen – strings
- Rob Bekhuis – vocal engineering
- Tom Myers – drums

== Charts ==
=== Weekly charts ===
Weekly chart performance for "Used to Love"
Chart (2019–2020)	Peak position
Australia (ARIA)	46
Belgium (Ultratop 50 Flanders)	25
Belgium (Ultratip Bubbling Under Wallonia)	3
Canada (Canadian Hot 100)	92
Croatia (HRT)	69
Czech Republic (Rádio – Top 100)	31
Czech Republic (Singles Digitál Top 100)	95
Hungary (Rádiós Top 40)	21
Ireland (IRMA)	60
Lithuania (AGATA)	64
Mexico Airplay (Billboard)	30
Netherlands (Dutch Top 40)	9
Netherlands (Single Top 100)	31
New Zealand Hot Singles (RMNZ)	14
Norway (VG-lista)	29
Slovakia (Rádio Top 100)	75
Slovakia (Singles Digitál Top 100)	68
Sweden (Sverigetopplistan)	40
Switzerland (Schweizer Hitparade)	42
UK Dance (OCC)	20
US Dance Club Songs (Billboard)	3
US Hot Dance/Electronic Songs (Billboard)	10

=== Year-end charts ===
2019 year-end chart performance for "Used to Love"
Chart (2019)	Position
Netherlands (Dutch Top 40)	94

2020 year-end chart performance for "Used to Love"
Chart (2020)	Position
Belgium (Ultratop Flanders)	60
Hungary (Rádiós Top 40)	75
Netherlands (Dutch Top 40)	57
US Hot Dance/Electronic Songs (Billboard)	39

== Certifications ==
Certifications for "Used to Love"
Region	Certification	Certified units/sales
Australia (ARIA)	Gold	35,000^{‡}
Brazil (Pro-Música Brasil)	Gold	20,000^{‡}
New Zealand (RMNZ)	Gold	15,000^{‡}
^{‡} Sales+streaming figures based on certification alone.

== Release history ==
Release dates and formats for "Used to Love"
Region	Date	Format	Version	Label	Ref.
Various	31 October 2019	Digital download; streaming	Original	Stmpd; Epic; Sony	
Australia	1 November 2019	Contemporary hit radio	Original	Epic; Sony	
Italy	1 November 2019	Contemporary hit radio	Original	Sony	
United Kingdom	1 November 2019	Various	Original	Epic	
Various	20 December 2019	Digital download; streaming	Remixes	Stmpd; Epic; Sony	
Various	14 February 2020	Digital download; streaming	Acoustic	Stmpd; Epic; Sony	
