= Lose My Mind (Dean Lewis song) =

Single by Dean Lewis

from the EP Same Kind of Different
- Released: 28 July 2017
- Length: 4:20
- Label: Island Australia; Universal Australia
- Songwriters: Dean Lewis; John Castle
- Producer: Castle

Dean Lewis singles chronology
"Need You Now" (2017)	"Lose My Mind" (2017)	"Chemicals" (2018)

Music video
- "Lose My Mind" on YouTube

"Lose My Mind" is a song by Australian singer and songwriter Dean Lewis. Released in July 2017 as the third single from his debut extended play Same Kind of Different (2017).

Lewis explained: ""Lose My Mind" could be my favourite song on the EP, it's about how you feel when you are on the verge of losing someone and you feel like you can't live without them. It's like the first night without that person who has been there for you. I remember feeling like the walls were closing in cause that person who I could always turn to was gone. That felt like losing my mind."

In August 2017, "Lose My Mind" was used in a television promotion for the Seven Network's show 800 Words. "Lose My Mind" was ARIA certified triple platinum.

An acoustic version was released on 20 October 2017.

== Track listing ==
No.	Title	Length
1.	"Lose My Mind"	4:20

Acoustic version
No.	Title	Length
1.	"Lose My Mind"	3:13

== Charts ==
Chart (2017)	Peak position
Australia (ARIA)	50
Australian Artist Singles (ARIA)	2

== Certifications ==
Region	Certification	Certified units/sales
Australia (ARIA)	3× Platinum	210,000^{‡}
Canada (Music Canada)	Gold	40,000^{‡}
New Zealand (RMNZ)	Gold	15,000^{‡}
United Kingdom (BPI)	Silver	200,000^{‡}
Streaming
Sweden (GLF)	Gold	4,000,000^{†}
^{‡} Sales+streaming figures based on certification alone.^{†} Streaming-only figures based on certification alone.
