= 7 Minutes (song) =

Single by Dean Lewis

from the album A Place We Knew
- Released: 18 January 2019
- Studio: The Barn Studio, North London
- Length: 3:31
- Label: Island Australia; Universal Australia
- Songwriter: Dean Lewis
- Producers: Lewis; Nick Atkinson; Edd Holloway

Dean Lewis singles chronology
| "Be Alright" (2018) | "7 Minutes" (2019) | "Stay Awake" (2019) |

Music video
- "7 Minutes" on YouTube

"7 Minutes" is a song by Australian singer and songwriter Dean Lewis. The song was released in January 2019 as the second single from Lewis' forthcoming debut studio album, A Place We Knew.

Lewis told Triple J "The song was conceived in a London cab two years ago after an argument with a girl...the line, 'Is it too late to turn around, I'm already halfway out of town' came into my head while I was sitting in an Uber about halfway from her place to mine." Lewis also said "The song is about meeting someone, making memories and then feeling regret." "Chasing Cars" by Snow Patrol is referenced in this song.

At the ARIA Music Awards of 2019, the album was nominated for Song of the Year.

At the APRA Music Awards of 2020, "7 Minutes" was nominated for Most Performed Australian Work of the Year and Most Performed Pop Work of the Year; winning the latter.

On 18 March 2019, Lewis performed "7 Minutes" as well as "Stay Awake" on Jimmy Kimmel Live!.

== Reception ==
Peter Tuscan from The Music Network said "'7 Minutes' has all the right ingredients for commercial success. Musically poignant verses and an all-out strummer of a chorus lead into a stripped back yet triumphant bridge, helped out by ethereal pads and drums." adding "Radio will no doubt have a field day with this track." Al Newstead from ABC said "'7 Minutes' is about lost love, with acoustic-plucking that builds to a stirring climax of rolling snare and dramatic vocal harmonies that will definitely appeal to fans of Vance Joy and Mumford and Sons."

== Charts ==
=== Weekly charts ===
| Chart (2019) | Peak position |
|---|---|
| Australia (ARIA) | 10 |
| Belgium (Ultratip Bubbling Under Flanders) | 28 |
| Ireland (IRMA) | 53 |
| Lithuania (AGATA) | 66 |
| New Zealand Hot Singles (RMNZ) | 5 |
| Sweden (Sverigetopplistan) | 65 |

=== Year-end charts ===
| Chart (2019) | Position |
|---|---|
| Australia (ARIA) | 45 |

== Certifications ==
| Region | Certification | Certified units/sales |
|---|---|---|
| Australia (ARIA) | 4× Platinum | 280,000^{‡} |
| Brazil (Pro-Música Brasil) | Gold | 20,000^{‡} |
| Canada (Music Canada) | Platinum | 80,000^{‡} |
| Denmark (IFPI Danmark) | Gold | 45,000^{‡} |
| New Zealand (RMNZ) | Platinum | 30,000^{‡} |
| Norway (IFPI Norway) | Gold | 30,000^{‡} |
| United Kingdom (BPI) | Silver | 200,000^{‡} |
Streaming
| Sweden (GLF) | Gold | 4,000,000^{†} |
^{‡} Sales+streaming figures based on certification alone.^{†} Streaming-only figures based on certification alone.

== Release history ==
| Country | Release date | Format | Label |
|---|---|---|---|
| Australia | 18 January 2019 | Digital download; streaming | Island Australia; Universal Australia |
