= Chemicals (Dean Lewis song) =

Single by Dean Lewis

from the EP Same Kind of Different
- Released: 23 March 2018
- Length: 3:41
- Label: Island Australia; Universal Australia
- Songwriter(s): Dean Lewis
- Producer(s): John Castle; Edd Holloway

Dean Lewis singles chronology
"Lose My Mind" (2017)	"Chemicals" (2018)	"Be Alright" (2018)

Music video
- "Chemicals" on YouTube

"Chemicals" is a song by Australian singer and songwriter Dean Lewis. Released in March 2018 as the fourth and final single from his debut extended play Same Kind of Different (2017). The song had been streamed more than 12 million times prior to the single's release and has been called a "fan favourite".

Lewis said "'Chemicals' was one of those songs that kind of fell from the sky. As in one of those songs that you start writing and the words just come down and it feels complete. It's happened a few times and I'm thankful for when it does as it's not too overthought. To me, Chemicals is that feeling of being addicted to someone and them being around you." During a live performance in November 2017, Lewis added "My friends thought this song was about drugs."

== Background and release ==
Lewis first performed "Chemicals" at a house in East London for the renowned UK Mahogany sessions. The YouTube recording received over 100,000 views and it was this recording that led to his signing with Island Records Australia in 2016.

== Music video ==
The music video for "Chemicals" was directed by Mick Jones and released on 22 March 2018. The video tracks the relationship of a young couple who are struggling with the concept of being together, and stars Brayden Dalmazzone and Lana Kington.

== Reception ==
In a review of the EP, Chelsea King from Forte Magazine said "While some of the tracks blur together, "Chemicals" is a song that stands out for its haunting nature. The lyrics "hold me I'm falling apart" are dappled throughout the song, creating an eerie sense."

== Certifications ==
Region	Certification	Certified units/sales
Australia (ARIA)	Platinum	70,000^{‡}
Canada (Music Canada)	Gold	40,000^{‡}
New Zealand (RMNZ)	Gold	15,000^{‡}
Streaming
Sweden (GLF)	Gold	4,000,000^{†}
^{‡} Sales+streaming figures based on certification alone.^{†} Streaming-only figures based on certification alone.
