= Dean Lewis =

Australian singer-songwriter (born 1987)

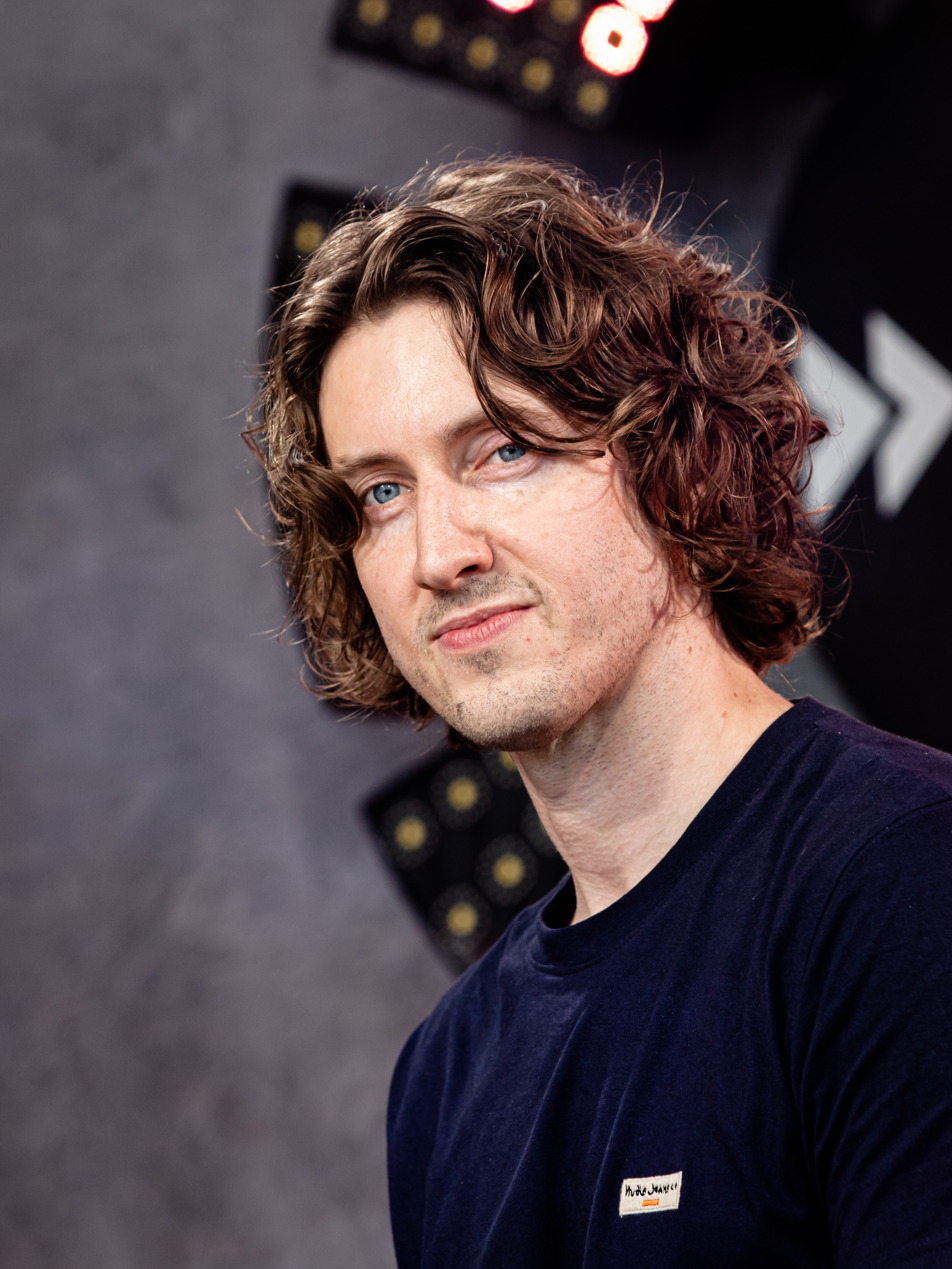
- Lewis in 2019

Background information
- Born: Dean Lewis Grant Loaney; 21 October 1985 (age 41); Sydney, New South Wales, Australia
- Genre: Pop
- Occupations: Singer; songwriter
- Years active: 2016–present
- Labels: Island; Universal Australia
- Website: deanlewismusic.com

Dean Lewis Grant Loaney, known professionally as Dean Lewis, is an Australian singer and songwriter. He is best known for his 2016 single "Waves", which has been certified seven times platinum in Australia, his 2022 single "How Do I Say Goodbye", which achieved worldwide popularity on social media and has been certified Gold or Platinum in ten countries, and his 2018 single "Be Alright", which reached number one in Australia and was certified Platinum within four weeks of release, eventually reaching 11 times platinum in Australia and multi-platinum worldwide, including double platinum in the United States.

Lewis has released three studio albums: A Place We Knew (2019), The Hardest Love (2022), and The Epilogue (2024). In 2025, he was accused of sexual misconduct and his label, Universal Music, parted ways with him.

== E-Sports ==
Lewis competed in e-sports, representing Australia in Halo 2 at the World Cyber Games 2005 in Singapore.

== Music career ==
=== 2016–2017: Career beginnings and Same Kind of Different ===
Lewis was inspired to pursue music after watching a live Oasis DVD in 2005, and "spent the next five years watching every Oasis video – Noel Gallagher basically taught me how to write songs."

Lewis signed his recording contract with Specific Music in 2014, and a major contract with Island Records and Universal Music Australia in March 2016. Lewis released his debut single "Waves" on 30 September 2016 which peaked at number 12 on the Australian ARIA Charts. The song was featured in a number of American television shows such as Suits, Grey's Anatomy, Valor, Riverdale, All American, Shadowhunters: The Mortal Instruments and Magnum P.I.. The song has since been certified 7× Platinum by ARIA.

Lewis released "Need You Now" in April 2017 and his debut extended play Same Kind of Different on 12 May 2017 which peaked at number 27 on the ARIA Album Charts. Lewis received five ARIA Award nominations at the ARIA Music Awards of 2017. "Lose My Mind" and "Chemicals" were also released as singles from the EP and have been certified Platinum and Gold respectively.

=== 2018–2020: A Place We Knew and collaborations ===
In June 2018, Lewis released "Be Alright". The single reached number one in Australia for five consecutive weeks, becoming his first chart-topper in the country, and has been certified eight times platinum in Australia. It also reached number one in Belgium, top five in New Zealand, Sweden and Ireland, top 10 in the Netherlands and Switzerland, top 20 in the United Kingdom and Scotland, top 30 in the United States and number one in the Billboard Adult pop chart. In January 2019, Lewis released "7 Minutes". Lewis released his debut studio album A Place We Knew on 22 March 2019. Lewis performed "Be Alright" and "Waves" at the 2019 AFL Grand Final. In 2019, Lewis signed with WME for representation in all areas.

Lewis released a single in collaboration with Dutch DJ/producer Martin Garrix on 31 October 2019 called "Used to Love". Regarding the collaboration with Garrix, Lewis explains that "Since my career began, collaborations never felt like something I saw myself pursuing. As a songwriter, who also sings, the entire concept just felt foreign. Until I met Martin. We spent about a week together locked behind closed doors in Amsterdam working on a song, which thought might end up be sung by someone else. But as the track progressed is started to sound a lot like me, but also very Martin. It's a real collaboration with a guy who's now become a great friend". An acoustic version of the song was released in 2020.

=== 2022–present: The Hardest Love and The Epilogue ===
On 5 March 2021, Lewis released the single "Falling Up". Lewis stated the song is about "being online and focusing on that one negative comment in a sea of good".

On 22 October 2021, Lewis released "Looks Like Me", which was inspired by a personal relationship where an ex was "hanging" with a guy that she said looked like Lewis. This was followed by "Hurtless" on 1 April 2022. On 2 September 2022, he released the single "How Do I Say Goodbye".

In 2024, Lewis opened several shows for AJR on their tour for The Maybe Man (2023). In June 2024, Lewis announced his third studio album The Epilogue, released in October 2024, alongside Australian tour dates.

At the end of 2025, it was confirmed that Lewis and Universal Music had parted ways.

== Personal life ==
=== Misconduct allegations ===
In October 2025, Lewis was the subject of various sexual misconduct allegations on social media. He responded to the allegations on Instagram, admitting wrongdoing but refuting any claims of illegal behaviour. This was paired with an announcement of a hiatus, and a promise to pursue therapy.

In November 2025, his award nominations for the 2025 ARIA Awards for Song of the Year and the 2025 TikTok Awards for Music Artist of the Year were withdrawn.

In late March 2026, Evie Smith, whose October 2025 TikTok video had contributed to the spread of allegations, posted a public apology on TikTok acknowledging that she had made serious claims without properly checking them. In a statement responding to the apology, Lewis said the situation had significantly damaged his reputation, career and personal life, and asked supporters not to direct abuse toward Smith.

Also in March 2026, the Amsterdam District Court dismissed Lewis's application for an injunction against Dutch woman Sanne van Ooijen, finding that because she had not named Lewis in her posts it could not be established that the allegations referred to him; Lewis was ordered to pay her legal costs of €1,707. A spokesperson for Lewis disputed the basis of the ruling.

== Discography ==
- A Place We Knew (2019)
- The Hardest Love (2022)
- The Epilogue (2024)

== Awards and nominations ==
=== ARIA Music Awards ===
The ARIA Music Awards is an annual awards ceremony that recognises excellence, innovation, and achievement across all genres of Australian music. Lewis has won three awards from 16 nominations.

Year	Nominee / work	Award	Result	Ref.
2017	"Waves"	Best Pop Release	Nominated	
2017	"Waves"	Breakthrough Artist	Nominated	
2017	"Waves"	Song of the Year	Nominated	
2017	Michael Jones for Dean Lewis "Waves"	Best Video	Nominated	
2017	John Castle for Dean Lewis "Lose My Mind"	Engineer of the Year	Nominated	
2018	"Be Alright"	Best Male Artist	Nominated	
2018	"Be Alright"	Best Pop Release	Nominated	
2018	"Be Alright"	Song of the Year	Nominated	
2018	Jessie Hill and Dean Lewis – "Be Alright"	Best Video	Won	
2018	2017 National Tour	Best Australian Live Act	Nominated	
2019	A Place We Knew	Album of the Year	Won	
2019	A Place We Knew	Best Male Artist	Won	
2019	A Place We Knew	Best Pop Release	Nominated	
2019	"7 Minutes"	Song of the Year	Nominated	
2021	"Falling Up"	Song of the Year	Nominated	
2022	"Hurtless"	Song of the Year	Nominated	
2023	"How Do I Say Goodbye"	Song of the Year	Nominated	
2025	"With You"	Song of the Year	Withdrawn (Note: In November 2025, Dean Lewis and his management requested to have his nomination for the 2025 ARIA Award for Song of the Year withdrawn following allegations of inappropriate behaviour by Lewis in October 2025. ARIA actioned this request.)	

=== APRA Awards ===
The APRA Awards are held in Australia and New Zealand by the Australasian Performing Right Association to recognise songwriting skills, sales and airplay performance by its members annually. Lewis has won seven awards.

Year	Nominee / work	Award	Result
2018	"Waves"	Pop Work of the Year	Nominated
2018	"Waves"	Most Played Australian Work	Nominated
2019	"Be Alright"	Pop Work of the Year	Nominated
2019	"Be Alright"	Song of the Year	Shortlisted
2019	Himself	Breakthrough Songwriter of the Year	Won
2019	Himself	Outstanding International Achievement Award	Won
2020	"7 Minutes"	Most Performed Australian Work of the Year	Nominated
2020	"7 Minutes"	Most Performed Pop Work of the Year	Won
2021	"Used to Love" (with Martin Garrix)	Most Performed Australian Work of the Year	Nominated
2021	"Used to Love" (with Martin Garrix)	Most Performed Dance Work of the Year	Nominated
2021	"Be Alright"	Most Performed Australian Work Overseas	Won
2022	"Falling Up"	Most Performed Alternative Work	Nominated
2023	"Hurtless"	Most Performed Australian Work	Nominated
2023	"Hurtless"	Most Performed Alternative Work	Won
2024	"How Do I Say Goodbye"	Most Performed Australian Work	Won
2024	"How Do I Say Goodbye"	Most Performed Pop Work	Won

=== MTV Europe Music Awards ===
The MTV Europe Music Awards is an award presented by Viacom International Media Networks to honour artists and music in pop culture.

Year	Nominee / work	Award	Result
2018	Himself	Best Australian Act	Nominated
2019	Himself	Best Australian Act	Nominated

=== National Live Music Awards ===
The National Live Music Awards (NLMAs) are a broad recognition of Australia's diverse live industry, celebrating the success of the Australian live scene. The awards commenced in 2016.

Year	Nominee / work	Award	Result
2018	Himself	Best Live Act of the Year – People's Choice	Nominated

=== Rolling Stone Australia Awards ===
The Rolling Stone Australia Awards are awarded annually in January or February by the Australian edition of Rolling Stone magazine for outstanding contributions to popular culture in the previous year.

Year	Nominee / work	Award	Result	Ref.
2025	Dean Lewis	Rolling Stone Global Award	Shortlisted	
