= Genesis Owusu discography =

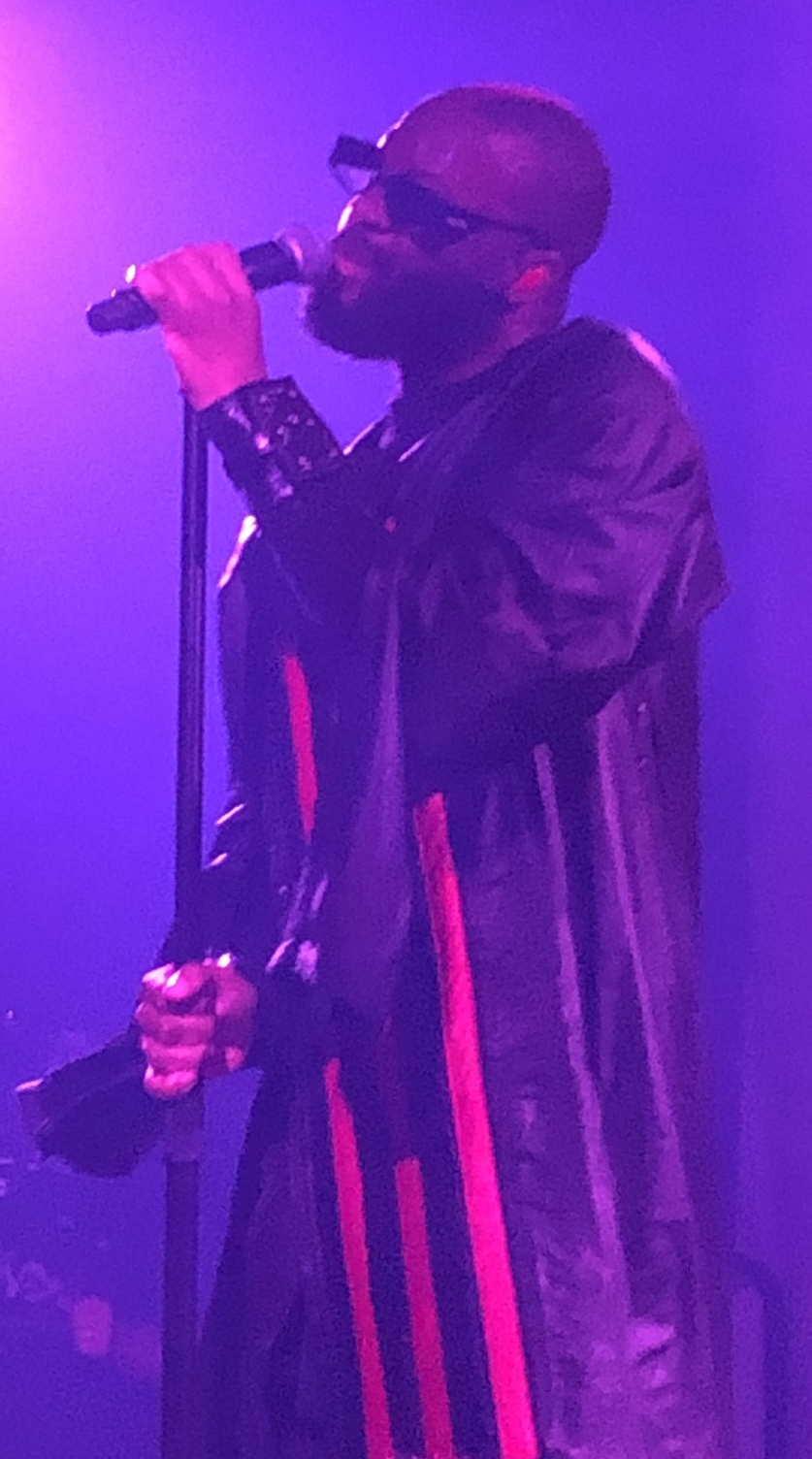
- Genesis Owusu in 2023
- Studio albums: 3
- EPs: 2
- Singles: 35

Ghanaian born Australian singer Genesis Owusu has released three studio albums, two extended play, and thirty-five singles, including nine as featured artist.

Owusu has been nominated for many awards, including AIR Awards, APRA Awards, ARIA Music Awards, Australian Music Prize, J Awards, National Live Music Awards, Rolling Stone Australia Awards and Vanda & Young Global Songwriting Competition winning all of these at least once.

== Albums ==
=== Studio albums ===
List of studio albums, with release date and label shown
Title	Album details	Peak chart positions
Title	Album details	AUS
Smiling with No Teeth	Released: 5 March 2021; Label: Ourness; Format: LP, digital download, streaming	27
Struggler	Released: 18 August 2023; Label: Ourness, AWAL; Format: LP, CD, digital download, streaming	4
Redstar Wu & the Worldwide Scourge	Released: 15 May 2026; Label: Ourness; Format: LP, CD, digital download, streaming	3

== Extended plays ==
List of EPs, with release date and label shown
Title	EP details
Cardrive EP	Released: 16 June 2017; Label: Ourness; Format: Digital download, streaming
Missing Molars (SWNT Deluxe)	Released: 13 July 2021; Label: Ourness; Format: Digital download, streaming

== Singles ==
=== As lead artist ===
List of singles, with year released and album name shown
Title	Year	Peak chart positions	Certifications	Album
Title	Year	US AAA	Certifications	Album
"Sideways"	2017	—		Non-album singles
"Awomen Amen"	2018	—		Non-album singles
"Wit' da Team"	2018	—		Non-album singles
"WUTD" / "Vultures"	2019	—	ARIA: Gold	Non-album singles
"Good Times" / "Simmer Down"	2019	—	ARIA: Gold	Non-album singles
"Don't Need You"	2020	—		Smiling with No Teeth
"Whip Cracker"	2020	—		Smiling with No Teeth
"I Am"	2020	—		Non-album single
"The Other Black Dog"	2020	—		Smiling with No Teeth
"Gold Chains"	2021	—		Smiling with No Teeth
"Drown" (featuring Kirin J Callinan)	2021	—		Smiling with No Teeth
"Same Thing"	2021	—		Missing Molars (SWNT Deluxe)
"The Fall"	2021	—		Missing Molars (SWNT Deluxe)
"Waitin' On Ya'"	2021	—		Smiling with No Teeth
"Anarchy in the UK" (Like a Version) (RSD 7")	2022	—		Non-album singles
"GTFO"	2022	—		Non-album singles
"Get Inspired"	2022	38		Non-album singles
"Endless Summer" (with Jack River)	2023	—		Endless Summer
"Hole Heart"	2023	—		NME x Bose's C32
"Leaving the Light"	2023	36		Struggler
"Tied Up!"	2023	35		Struggler
"Survivor"	2023	—		Struggler
"Pirate Radio"	2025	—		Redstar Wu & the Worldwide Scourge
"Death Cult Zombie"	2025	—		Redstar Wu & the Worldwide Scourge
"Stampede"	2026	—		Redstar Wu & the Worldwide Scourge
"Life Keeps Going"	2026	—		Redstar Wu & the Worldwide Scourge
"Human Again"	2026	—		
"Black Star" (with The Drums)	2026	—		

=== As featured artist ===
Title	Year	Album
"We On" (Kirklandd featuring Genesis Owusu)	2016	Non-album single
"Unwritten Laws" (Maina Doe featuring Genesis Owusu)	2019	Non-album single
"Funny Business" (Citizen Kay featuring Genesis Owusu)	2020	Non-album single
"Coliseum" (Tim Shiel featuring Genesis Owusu)	2020	Non-album single
"Dream No More" (Billy Davis featuring Ruel and Genesis Owusu)	2021	This Is What's Important
"Back Seat" (Anna Lunoe featuring Genesis Owusu)	2021	TBA
"There's Only One" (Winston Surfshirt featuring Genesis Owusu)	2022	Panna Cotta
"Cheque" (Tasman Keith featuring Genesis Owusu)	2022	A Colour Undone
"Guap Pop" (Agung Mango featuring Genesis Owusu)	2022	Man On the Go
"Attention Economics" (Contact Sports featuring Genesis Owusu)	2026	Contact Sports
