= Gold Chains (song) =

2021 single by Genesis Owusu

Single by Genesis Owusu

from the album Smiling with No Teeth
- Released: 19 February 2021
- Length: 3:38
- Label: Genesis Owusu
- Songwriters: Kofi Ansah; Andrew Klippel; Kieran John Callinan; Michael Di Francesco; Julian Sudek
- Producers: Andrew Klippel; Hammer

Genesis Owusu singles chronology
"The Other Black Dog" (2020)	"Gold Chains" (2021)	"Drown" (2021)

Music video
- "Gold Chains" on YouTube

"Gold Chains" is a song by Ghanaian-Australian singer, Genesis Owusu, released on 19 February 2021 as the fourth single from Owusu's debut studio album, Smiling with No Teeth. Upon release, Owusu said the track was one of the first written for the album and lyrically, set the tone for the rest of the record.

The song won first place in the 2021 Vanda & Young Global Songwriting Competition.

In January 2022, Owusu performed the song on The Late Show With Stephen Colbert.

== Critical reception ==
David Renshall from The Fader said "The song, a crunchy funk-rap number indebted to Prince and André 3000, plays as a celebratory moment but dig into Owusu's lyrics a little and there's an emptiness to the life of success and adoration."

== Track listings ==
Digital download/streaming

1. "Gold Chains" – 3:38

Digital download/streaming

1. "Gold Chains" (Harvey Sutherland remix) – 3:45
