= Smiling with No Teeth =

Studio album by Genesis Owusu
- Released: 5 March 2021
- Genres: Alternative R&B; experimental hip-hop; neo soul; rap rock; experimental rock; punk rock
- Length: 53:54
- Labels: Ourness; House Anxiety
- Producers: Matt Corby; Dave Hammer; Andrew Klippel; Harvey Sutherland

Genesis Owusu chronology
Cardrive EP (2017)	Smiling with No Teeth (2021)	Struggler (2023)

Singles from Smiling with No Teeth
- 1. "Don't Need You" Released: 15 May 2020; 2. "Whip Cracker" Released: 6 June 2020; 3. "The Other Black Dog" Released: 19 November 2020; 4. "Gold Chains" Released: 19 February 2021; 5. "Drown" Released: 3 March 2021; 6. "Waitin' On Ya'" Released: December 2021

Singles from Missing Molars
- 1. "Same Thing" Released: 2 June 2021; 2. "The Fall" Released: 14 July 2021

Smiling with No Teeth is the debut studio album by Australian musician Genesis Owusu. It was released through Ourness on 5 March 2021. The album features a guest appearance from Kirin J. Callinan, while its production was handled by Andrew Klippel, Dave Hammer, Harvey Sutherland, and Matt Corby. Preceded by five singles—"Don't Need You", "Whip Cracker", "The Other Black Dog", "Gold Chains", and "Drown" (featuring Kirin J. Callinan)—Smiling with No Teeth debuted at number 27 on the ARIA Albums Chart.

At the 2021 ARIA Music Awards, the album won Album of the Year, Best Hip Hop Release and Best Independent Release while Andrew Klippel and Dave Hammer won Producer of the Year. Owusu was nominated for Best Artist and Kofi Anash & Bailey Howard were nominated for Best Cover Art.

At the J Awards of 2021, the album won the Australian Album of the Year and in March 2022, won the Australian Music Prize and Best Record at the 2022 Rolling Stone Australia Awards. at the AIR Awards of 2022, it won Independent Album of the Year.

== Critical reception ==
Professional ratings
Aggregate scores
Source	Rating
AnyDecentMusic?	8.1/10
Metacritic	86/100
Review scores
Source	Rating
DIY	4/5 stars
Earmilk	9/10
Gigwise	7/10 stars
Loud and Quiet	9/10
musicOMH	4.5/5 stars
NME	4/5 stars
The Arts Desk	4/5 stars
The Independent	4/5 stars
The Line of Best Fit	9/10
The Sydney Morning Herald	4.5/5 stars

Smiling with No Teeth received critical acclaim. At Metacritic, which assigns a normalized rating out of 100 to reviews from mainstream publications, the album received an average score of 86 based on six reviews, indicating "universal acclaim". The aggregator AnyDecentMusic? gave it 8.1 out of 10, based on their assessment of the critical consensus.

Mark Salisbury of Earmilk praised the album, saying that it "is a visceral sonic attack on the senses and should cement Genesis Owusu as an international renaissance man". Mike Vinti of Loud and Quiet said, "A triumph from top to bottom, Smiling with No Teeth sets the stage for Genesis Owusu to become a potentially generation-defining star". John Murphy of musicOMH said, "it's an album that's easy to feel intimidated by at first listen, due to its sheer scale and ambition. However, after a few listens you'll be in no doubt that Genesis Owusu is one of the most exciting names of the year". Steven Loftin of The Line of Best Fit said, "Owusu's debut offering not only manages to deftly balance style with substance, but does so with a jubilance that gives as much reason to curl up your own most toothy grin". Simone Ziaziaris of The Sydney Morning Herald said, "via forays into multiple musical genres, Smiling with No Teeth creates a space both for Owusu to express his own personal experiences, and for others to question nuanced complexities". Jenessa Williams of DIY said, "like Gorillaz, Outkast or even The Weeknd before him, he plays well with dark and sinister, throwing theatrical voice in a musical hall of mirrors with real versatility". Cyclone Wehner of NME said, "with Smiling With No Teeth, Genesis Owusu has delivered a riveting album that underscores the power of self-knowledge, perspective and art – one that should be cranked loud". Thomas H Green of The Arts Desk found that the album "brings to mind an overdose of references, but the musical magpie-ism is more Prince than pastiche". Rachel Brodsky of The Independent said, "with strong, clear-eyed subtext, overlaid by compositions that touch on every influence from TV on the Radio to Prince, Childish Gambino and Radiohead, Smiling With No Teeth is not so much an album as it is a memoir". Sofie Lindevall of Gigwise said that the album "has plenty of not only good, but great, songs and whether you are a fan of high energy hip-hop, raw punk-esque guitars or soulful R&B, there is something on the album for you".

=== Mid-year lists ===
Smiling with No Teeth on mid-year lists
Publication	List	Rank	Ref.
The Music	The Music's Top 25 Albums Of 2021 (So Far)	—N/a	

=== Year-end lists ===
Smiling with No Teeth on end of year lists
Publication	List	Rank	Ref.
Double J	The 50 Best Albums of 2021	11	
NME	The 50 Best Albums of 2021	29	
Paste	The 50 Best Albums of 2021	50	

== Commercial performance ==
Smiling with No Teeth debuted and peaked at number 27 on the ARIA Albums Chart for the chart dated 15 March 2021.

The album also debuted at number 3 on the ARIA Top 20 Vinyl Albums Chart, and at number 5 on the ARIA Top 20 Australian Albums Chart.

== Track listing ==
All lyrics are written by Kofi Owusu-Ansah; "Drown" lyrics written with Kirin J. Callinan.

Smiling with No Teeth track listing
No.	Title	Music	Producer(s)	Length
1.	"On the Move!"	Kofi Owusu-Ansah; Andrew Klippel; David Haddad	Klippel; Dave Hammer	1:47
2.	"The Other Black Dog"	Owusu-Ansah; Klippel; Michael Di Francesco	Klippel; James Dring^{[a]}; Hammer^{[a]}	4:23
3.	"Centrefold"	Owusu-Ansah; Klippel; Di Francesco; Julian Sudek	Klippel; Hammer^{[a]}	3:16
4.	"Waitin' on Ya"	Owusu-Ansah; Klippel; Di Francesco; Sudek	Klippel	5:44
5.	"Don't Need You"	Owusu-Ansah; Klippel; Di Francesco; Sudek; Haddad	Klippel; Hammer	3:05
6.	"Drown" (featuring Kirin J. Callinan)	Owusu-Ansah; Klippel; Callinan; Di Francesco; Sudek; Haddad	Klippel; Hammer	2:57
7.	"Gold Chains"	Owusu-Ansah; Klippel; Di Francesco; Sudek	Klippel; Hammer^{[a]}	3:38
8.	"Smiling with No Teeth"	Owusu-Ansah; Klippel; Di Francesco; Sudek	Klippel	4:59
9.	"I Don't See Colour"	Owusu-Ansah; Klippel; Di Francesco; Sudek	Klippel; Hammer^{[a]}	2:56
10.	"Black Dogs!"	Owusu-Ansah; Matt Corby	Corby	2:00
11.	"Whip Cracker"	Owusu-Ansah; Klippel; Di Francesco; Sudek	Klippel	4:41
12.	"Easy"	Owusu-Ansah; Harvey Sutherland	Sutherland	3:02
13.	"A Song About Fishing"	Owusu-Ansah; Klippel; Di Francesco; Sudek	Klippel; Hammer^{[a]}	3:25
14.	"No Looking Back"	Owusu-Ansah; Klippel; Di Francesco; Sudek	Klippel	3:42
15.	"Bye Bye"	Owusu-Ansah; Klippel; Di Francesco; Sudek	Klippel; Hammer	4:09
Total length:				53:44

Missing Molars (Swnt Deluxe) track listing
No.	Title	Music	Producer(s)	Length
1.	"The Fall"	Ansah; Klippel; Di Francesco; Sudek; Haddad	Klippel; Hammer	2:18
2.	"What Do I Fear?"	Ansah; Klippel; Di Francesco; Sudek; Haddad		3:34
3.	"Same Thing"	Ansah; Klippel; Di Francesco; Sudek	Klippel; Hammer	3:12
4.	"Fallen Branches"	Ansah; Klippel; Di Francesco; Sudek	Klippel; Hammer	4:13
5.	"Crosses"	Ansah; Klippel; Di Francesco; Sudek	Klippel; Hammer	3:11
Total length:				70:12

=== Note ===
- ^{^[a]} indicates an additional producer
- The deluxe version removes the outro of "The Other Black Dog", changing the length from 4:23 to 3:30

== Personnel ==
Credits are adapted from the album's liner notes.

=== Musicians ===
- Kofi Owusu-Ansah – vocals
- Kirin J. Callinan – guitar (tracks 1–9, 11, 13–15), vocals (6)
- Michael Di Francesco – bass guitar (1–9, 11, 13–15)
- Julian Sudek – drums (1–9, 11, 13–15)
- Andrew Klippel – electric piano, keyboards, backing vocal arrangements (1–9, 11, 13–15)
- Ella Seabrook – backing vocals (1, 9, 11)
- Kye – backing vocals (2, 4, 8, 13–15)
- Ruel – backing vocals (7, 8)
- Laura Christoforidis – backing vocals (12)
- Jace XL – backing vocals (12)
- Christopher Bruce – additional rhythm guitar (2–4, 7, 9, 11)
- Matt Corby – all instruments (10)
- Kumar Shome – guitar (12)
- Steve Wyreman – additional keyboards, additional guitars (13)
- Dane Laboyrie – brass (4, 14)
- Ben Gurton – brass (4, 14)
- Matthew Ottignon – brass (4, 14)

=== Technical and visuals ===
- Dave Hammer – mixing (1, 3, 5–7, 9, 13, 15)
- James Dring – mixing (2)
- Andrew Dawson – mixing (10)
- Konstantin Kersting – mixing (12)
- George Nicholas – engineering (1–8, 11, 14, 15)
- Thomas Marland – engineering (1–8, 11, 14, 15)
- Simon Cohen – engineering (2–4, 7–9, 11, 13, 14)
- Matt Corby – engineering (10)
- Harvey Sutherland – engineering (12)
- Joe LaPorta – mastering
- Bailey Howard – front and back art photography
- Kofi Owusu-Ansah – editing
- Justin Ridler – inner art

== Charts ==
Chart performance for Smiling with No Teeth
Chart (2021)	Peak position
Australian Albums (ARIA)	27
