= Kahukx =

Australian rapper and musician

- Born: Jack Kahui
- Origin: Sydney, New South Wales, Australia
- Genres: Australian hip hop; hip hop; drill
- Occupations: Rapper; singer; songwriter; musician
- Years active: 2022–present
- Labels: ADA; Warner Music Australia
- Website: www.kahukx.com

Jack Kahui, professionally known as Kahukx, is an Australian rapper and musician. Kahukx released his debut EP in May 2023.

== Career ==
In January 2022, Kahukx released his debut single "Due Time". The song samples Billie Eilish and Khalid's "Lovely" and was produced by ME13 Beats.

In June 2022, Kahukx featured on Day1's "Mbappé". The song was certified gold in Australia in 2023.

On 26 May 2023, Kahukx released his debut EP titled Nothing to Something.

== Discography ==
=== Extended plays ===
List of EPs, with release date, label, and selected chart positions shown
Title	Details	Peak chart positions
Title	Details	AUS
Nothing to Something	Released: 26 May 2023; Label: ADA/Warner (5054197652271); Format: Digital download, streaming	89
Syd to Ldn	Released: 18 July 2025; Label: Aura; Format: digital download, streaming	

=== Charted and certified singles ===
List of charted and certified singles, with year released, and album name shown
Title	Year	Peak chart positions	Certification	Album
Title	Year	NZ Hot	Certification	Album
"Mbappé" (Day1 featuring Kahukx)	2022	—	ARIA: Gold	TBA
"CFB" (with Open Till L8)	2023	35		Non-album single

== Awards and nominations ==
=== ARIA Music Awards ===
The ARIA Music Awards is an annual awards ceremony that recognises excellence, innovation, and achievement across all genres of Australian music. They commenced in 1987.

ARIA Music Awards recognition for Kahukx
Year	Nominee / work	Award	Result	Ref.
2022	"Mbappé" (Day1 featuring Kahukx)	Best Hip Hop / Rap Release	Nominated	
2023	"Mbappé" (Day1 featuring Kahukx)	Song of the Year	Nominated	
2023	Nothing to Something	Best Hip Hop / Rap Release	Nominated	
