= Day1 =

Australian rapper and musician

- Born: Wataru Shimizu; 15 December 1994 (age 31)
- Origin: Brisbane, Queensland Australia
- Genre: Australian hip hop
- Occupations: Rapper; singer; songwriter; musician
- Years active: 2019–present
- Labels: DB Music; Warner Music Australia

Day1 (born 15 December 1994), is an Australian rapper and musician. Day1 released his debut EP titled Day Uno in August 2021.

== Career ==
In 2019, Day1 released his debut single "Boss". This was followed by Day1 featured on A Boogie wit da Hoodies all-Australian "Mood Swings" remix.

In April 2020, Day1 released the single, "Riding".

On 6 August 2021, Day1 released his debut EP titled Day Uno. The EP features several different producers.

In June 2022, Day1 released "Mbappé" featuring Kahukx The song was certified gold in Australia in 2023.

In October 2023, Day1 released "Southside Dilla", and confirmed a second project is scheduled for release in 2024.

== Discography ==
=== Extended plays ===
List of EPs, with release date, label, and selected chart positions shown
Title	Details	Peak chart positions
Title	Details	AUS
Day Uno	Released: 6 August 2021; Label: Warner (0190296610974); Format: CD, digital download, streaming	— (Note: Day Uno did not enter the ARIA Top 50 Album Chart, but peaked at number 13 on the Australian Artists Album Chart.)
4 Now	Released: 5 June 2025; Label: DB Warner; Format: digital download, streaming	— (Note: 4 Now did not enter the ARIA Top 50 Album Chart, but peaked at number 10 on the Australian Hip Hop Artists Album Chart.)

=== Charted and certified singles ===
List of charted and certified singles, with year released, and album name shown
Title	Year	Peak chart positions	Certification	Album
Title	Year	NZ Hot	Certification	Album
"Mbappé'" (featuring Kahukx)	2022	—	ARIA: Gold	Golden Tan
"Golden Tan"	2023	17		Golden Tan

== Awards and nominations ==
=== ARIA Music Awards ===
The ARIA Music Awards is an annual awards ceremony that recognises excellence, innovation, and achievement across all genres of Australian music. They commenced in 1987.

Year	Nominee / work	Award	Result	Ref.
2022	"Mbappé" (featuring Kahukx)	Best Hip Hop/Rap Release	Nominated	
2023	"Mbappé" (featuring Kahukx)	Song of the Year	Nominated	
