= Grant High School (Mount Gambier) =

Location
- Hosking Avenue; Mount Gambier, South Australia, 5290; Australia; 37°50′47″S 140°47′36″E

Information
- Type: Public
- Motto: Respect Trust Commitment
- Established: 1961
- School district: Limestone Coast
- Principal: Caroline Davey
- Grades: 7–12
- Colours: Green, gold and white
- Website: web.granths.sa.edu.au/ghs

Grant High School is a public secondary school situated in Mount Gambier, South Australia.

== Students ==
Grant High School has around 1068 students in grades 7–12.

== Facilities ==
Grant High School has many facilities: a large library, three large sports ovals, a sufficient computer room, and a gymnasium. A bi-annual school production featuring a range of students is held at the Sir Robert Helpmann Theatre. Both classic and teacher-written productions have been used. At the ARIA Music Awards of 2018, the school's Scott Maxwell won Music Teacher of the Year.

== Athletic programs ==
Grant High School is on sport. Its main sporting focus is on cricket, Australian rules football, baseball, netball, basketball, and soccer. A few years ago, a group of their baseball students went to Perth, Western Australia to compete in a national competition. There is also a chess community.
