= WUTD =

2019 single by Genesis Owusu

"WUTD + Vultures"

Single by Genesis Owusu
- Released: 15 March 2019
- Label: Ourness, AWAL
- Songwriters: Kofi Ansah; Paul Castelluzzo; Matthew Louis Merisola; Joy Harryson; Vicky Ngyuen

Genesis Owusu singles chronology
"Wit' da Team" (2018)	"WUTD + Vultures" (2019)	"Good Times" / "Simmer Down" (2019)

"WUTD" + "Vultures" are two songs by Ghanaian-Australian singer, Genesis Owusu, released as a double-A side single in March 2019.

Upon release, Owusu said "'Vultures' is almost harrowing in its lyricism, detailing a lingering internal and external strife. But then it goes into 'WUTD', which is a song purely for me to shake my ass to. It kind of makes no sense and all the sense in the world at the same time."

At the 2019 ARIA Music Awards it was nominated for ARIA Award for Best Soul/R&B Release.

== Reception ==
Al Newstead from Australian Broadcasting Corporation said, "'WUTD' is a slinky brew of RnB falsetto and funk backbone, and Genesis comes off like a total stud in the hazy blue music video, directed by Bartolomeo Celestino." Newstead continued with "'Vultures' finds its groove in trippy synth-wave that's draped in gossamer guitars and trickling washes. It'd sound right at home on a playlist snuggled between Theophilus London and Tame Impala's 'Whiplash' and A$AP Rocky's 'Sundress'".

Hayden Davis from PileRats said "'WUTD' is a soulful blend of tropical, Californian melodies and Owusu's more R&B-leaning vocal, which rises and falls as the single's production transforms around it." Davis said, "'Vultures', somehow more ferocious yet also more relaxed, with a psychedelic swirl of synth melodies and punchy percussion layered underneath his vocal which this time around, takes on a more traditional hip-hop sound."

== Track listings ==
Digital download/streaming

1. "Vultures" – 3:42
2. "WUTD" – 2:37

== Certifications ==
Certifications and sales for "WUTD"
Region	Certification	Certified units/sales
Australia (ARIA)	Gold	35,000^{‡}
^{‡} Sales+streaming figures based on certification alone.
