= PetroDragonic Apocalypse =

PetroDragonic Apocalypse; or, Dawn of Eternal Night: An Annihilation of Planet Earth and the Beginning of Merciless Damnation

Studio album by King Gizzard & the Lizard Wizard
- Released: 16 June 2023
- Genres: Thrash metal; progressive metal
- Length: 48:41 (digital); 63:03 (vinyl)
- Label: KGLW
- Producer: Stu Mackenzie

King Gizzard & the Lizard Wizard chronology
Live at Red Rocks '22 (2023)	PetroDragonic Apocalypse (2023)	Demos Vol. 5 + Vol. 6 (2023)

Singles from PetroDragonic Apocalypse
- 1. "Gila Monster/Witchcraft" Released: 16 May 2023; 2. "Dragon" Released: 6 June 2023; 3. "Supercell"/"Converge" Released: 24 August 2023

PetroDragonic Apocalypse; or, Dawn of Eternal Night: An Annihilation of Planet Earth and the Beginning of Merciless Damnation (often shortened to PetroDragonic Apocalypse) is the twenty-fourth studio album by Australian rock band King Gizzard & the Lizard Wizard, released on 16 June 2023.

Recorded based on jam sessions, the album sees the band incorporating a heavy metal style. Lead vocalist Stu Mackenzie stated that the album's concept is "about humankind, and it's about planet Earth, but it's also about witches and dragons, and shit." Bassist Lucas Harwood has stated that the album is the first of two albums (the other being The Silver Cord) with a "Yin and Yang" concept, describing the two albums as "going to be very different sounding to each other, but we're going to try to make them complement each other."

At the 2023 ARIA Music Awards, the album was nominated for Best Group and Best Hard Rock/Heavy Metal Album.

== Background ==
On March 4, 2023, the band debuted the song "Gila Monster" during their performance in Tilburg, Netherlands. Later that month, on March 12, 2023, they posted a video on their social media with the caption "New album locked and JOEDED," featuring a clip from what was presumed to be a new song. On May 7, 2023, they announced the album and artwork, which was described by the band as "a vivid, fiery painting of a lizard-like monster in an industrial, apocalyptic landscape." They called the music "heavy as fuck" and announced that pre-orders were starting on May 16.

Alongside the pre-orders, on May 16, 2023, the band released the lead single "Gila Monster" with an accompanying music video and announced that the release date for the album would be June 16, 2023. Many critics noted the track was a return to the thrash metal of Infest the Rats' Nest, and despite that album being labeled as a "one-off experiment", the band "have heard the siren call of metal in the wind."

On May 28, 2023, the band debuted the song "Converge" during the Boston Calling Music Festival. "Converge" was first released on the compilation Demos Vol. 3 + Vol. 4 under the title "Uncolonise". "Converge," "Supercell," and "Witchcraft" were played live in full ahead of the album's release, and "Motor Spirit" was played partially ahead of the album's release. The second single, "Dragon," was released on June 6, 2023, alongside a music video directed by Jason Galea.

On June 8, 2023, the band played the album in full as intermission music between their two sets at Red Rocks.

== Recording ==
Many people have noted and even called it a follow up to the band's thrash metal album Infest the Rats' Nest. Stu Mackenzie has talked about this similarity, stating:

"When we made Rats' Nest, it felt experimental. Like, 'Here's this music that some of us grew up on but we'd never had the guts or confidence to really play before, so let's give it a go and see what happens.' And when we made that album, we were like, 'Fuck, why did it take us so long to do this?' It's just so much fun to play that music, and those songs work so well when we play them live. So we always had it in our minds to make another metal record."

The recording was similarly done to the band's album, Ice, Death, Planets, Lungs, Mushrooms and Lava, where the band wrote a song a day with "no riffs, no tunes, no ideas, and started from scratch." Mackenzie explained how the band would put the songs together using the jams, which were all recorded. He also stated that for the lyrics and concept:

"I'd sketched out the story the songs would tell, and I'd portioned it out into seven song titles, with a short paragraph of what would happen in the song. I guess we kind of made the record backwards."

== Songs ==
The lead single (and first track performed live) "Gila Monster" has been described by critics as having "four-plus minutes of thrash-infused riffage and gang vocals" with the guitar solo in the last minute described as having "bleak, impossibly heavy shredding." The music video was directed by SPOD, who "wanted to shoot Lord of the Rings 4 but also make a video game, so I mixed both mediums and came up with this majestic journey for truth and power in a cursed world. I mixed 3D animation, modeling & live footage in a 3D video game program to create this marvelous voyage of man & beast. Friend or foe?"

"Dragon" was released as the album's second single. It has been described as balancing their affinity for metal with their "gonzo psych weirdness." According to Galea:

"Over the last two months, I dusted off my music video computer to slay the 10-minute "Dragon." I wanted to explore a harsh, distorted visual palette using my live visual setup mixed with PS1 cutscene-inspired animation and studio footage I filmed of the band. The animation was created using Cinema 4D and processed through After Effects and a Tachyons circuit-bent video unit."

The album also contains a 14-minute bonus track, "Dawn of Eternal Night," featuring Leah Senior, available exclusively on vinyl. The style of Senior's calm narration over background sounds performed by the band is reminiscent of the interludes featured in the group's earlier album, Murder of the Universe.

== Reception ==
Professional ratings
Aggregate scores
Source	Rating
Metacritic	76/100
Review scores
Source	Rating
AllMusic	4/5 stars
Classic Rock	3.5/5 stars
Exclaim!	8/10
Loud and Quiet	7/10
Pitchfork	5.4/10
Riff Magazine	8/10
Sputnikmusic	4.5/5 stars

According to the review aggregator Metacritic, PetroDragonic Apocalypse received "generally favorable reviews" based on a weighted average score of 76 out of 100 from 7 critic scores. A four-out-of-five-star review in AllMusic commended the performances, compositions, and lyrical themes on the album, concluding: "The stricter members of the metal community might see King Gizzard as interlopers with no real metal cred, but after Rats Nest and now this thrillingly massive album, there's no reason the band shouldn't be considered one of the best practitioners of the genre around."

== Track listing ==
Vinyl releases have tracks 1–2 on side A, 3–5 on side B, 6–7 on side C, and 8 on side D.

All lyrics are written by Stu Mackenzie, Ambrose Kenny-Smith, Joey Walker, Cook Craig, and Lucas Harwood.

PetroDragonic Apocalypse track listing
No.	Title	Music	Length
1.	"Motor Spirit"	Mackenzie; Walker; Cavanagh; Craig; Kenny-Smith; Harwood	8:33
2.	"Supercell"	Mackenzie; Walker; Cavanagh; Craig; Kenny-Smith; Harwood	5:06
3.	"Converge"	Mackenzie; Walker; Cavanagh; Craig; Kenny-Smith; Harwood	6:16
4.	"Witchcraft"	Mackenzie; Walker; Cavanagh; Craig	5:04
5.	"Gila Monster"	Mackenzie; Walker; Cavanagh; Craig; Kenny-Smith	4:36
6.	"Dragon"	Mackenzie; Walker; Cavanagh; Craig; Kenny-Smith	9:45
7.	"Flamethrower"	Mackenzie; Walker; Cavanagh; Craig; Kenny-Smith	9:21
Total length:			48:41

Vinyl and CD bonus track
No.	Title	Writer(s)	Length
8.	"Dawn of Eternal Night" (featuring Leah Senior)	Mackenzie	14:22
Total length:			63:03

== Personnel ==
Musicians

- Stu Mackenzie – guitars, bass, vocals, synthesizer on "Flamethrower" and "Dawn of Eternal Night"
- Ambrose Kenny-Smith – vocals, synthesizer on "Flamethrower"
- Joey Walker – guitars, bass, vocals, synthesizer on "Flamethrower"
- Michael Cavanagh – drums, percussion, vocals, electronic drum kit on "Flamethrower"
- Cook Craig – bass, vocals, synthesizer on "Flamethrower"
- Lucas Harwood – synthesizer on "Flamethrower"

Additional musicians

- Leah Senior – spoken word on "Dawn of Eternal Night"

Technical

- Stu Mackenzie – production, recording engineer, mixing
- Joey Walker – recording engineer, mixing
- Jesse Williams – recording engineer
- Nico Wilson – recording engineer
- Joe Carra – mastering

Artwork

- Jason Galea – artwork, layout, photography

== Charts ==
Chart performance for PetroDragonic Apocalypse
Chart (2023)	Peak position
Australian Albums (ARIA)	2
Belgian Albums (Ultratop Wallonia)	195
German Albums (Offizielle Top 100)	78
Scottish Albums (Official Charts)	53
UK Album Downloads (Official Charts)	36
UK Rock & Metal Albums (Official Charts)	5
US Billboard 200	85
US Independent Albums	16
US Top Alternative Albums	8
US Top Hard Rock Albums	3
US Top Rock Albums	13
US Top Rock & Alternative Albums	18
