= ARIA Award for Best Solo Artist =

Australian record industry award

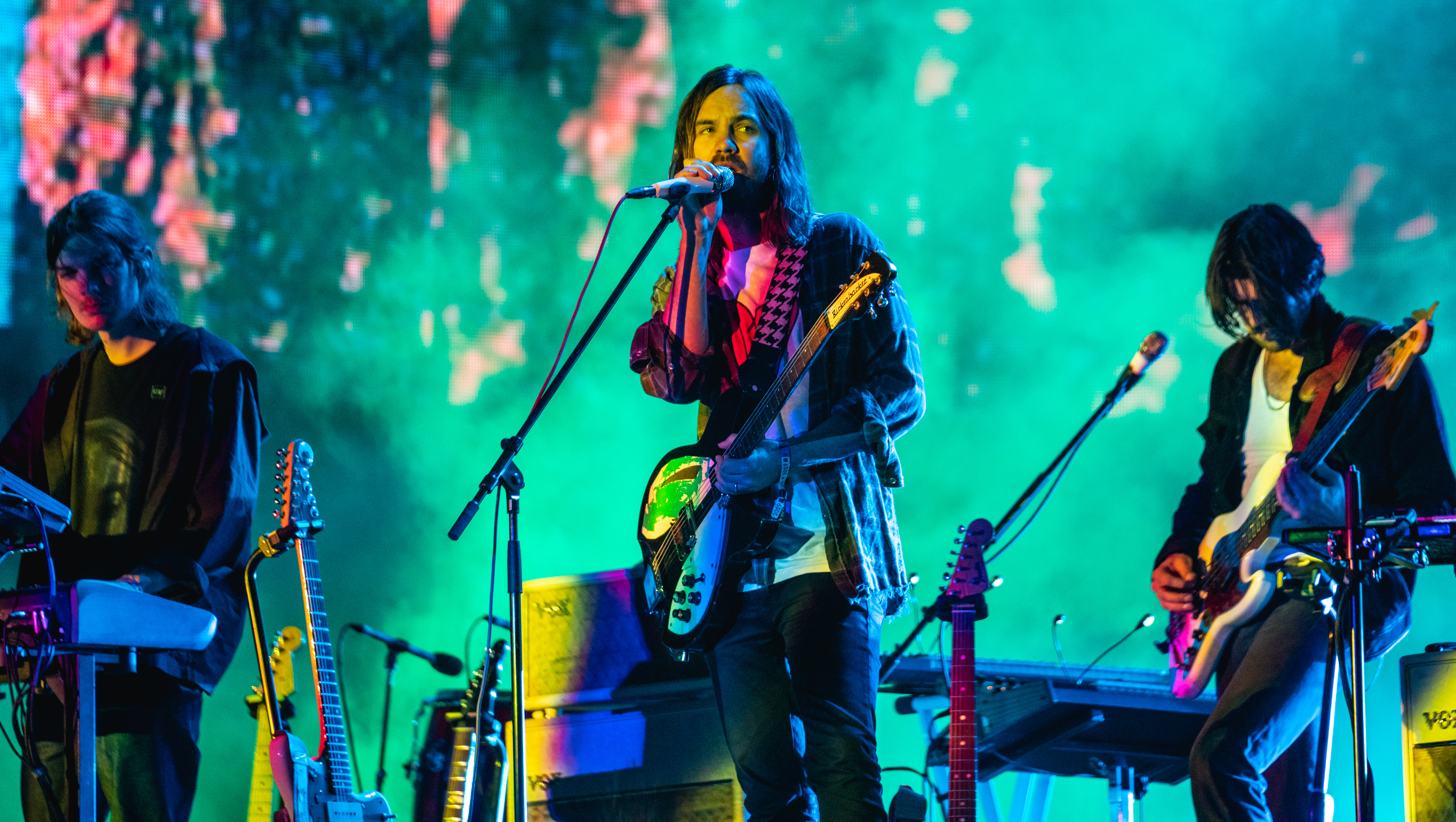
- 2026 winner Tame Impala
- Country: Australia
- Presented by: Australian Recording Industry Association (ARIA)
- First award: 2021
- Currently held by: Tame Impala, Deadbeat (2026)

Highlights
- Most wins: Troye Sivan (2)
- Most nominations: The Kid Laroi (5)
- Website: ariaawards.com.au

The ARIA Award for Best Solo Artist is an award first presented at the 2021 ARIA Music Awards as ARIA Award for Best Artist. It is handed out by the Australian Recording Industry Association (ARIA), an organisation whose aim is "to advance the interests of the Australian record industry."

In 2021, the previous categories of Best Male Artist and Best Female Artist were combined to ensure that the ARIA Awards reflect and embrace equality and the true diversity of the music industry. In making this change the number of final nominees for Best Artist was ten.

The category was renamed to Best Solo Artist in 2022, still with ten final nominees.

Troye Sivan became the first artist to win multiple times with his second consecutive win in 2024. The Kid Laroi has the most nominations with five, having been nominated at every ceremony from the award's inception until 2025, while Kylie Minogue has the most nominations without a win with four. Canadian singer Justin Bieber, one of the inaugural winners along with The Kid Laroi as a co-lead artist on "Stay", is the only non-Australian nominee.

== Winners and nominees ==
Winner marked in a separate colour

Year	Winner(s)	Album/single title
2021 (35th)
2021 (35th)	The Kid Laroi & Justin Bieber	"Stay"
2021 (35th)	Amy Shark	Cry Forever
2021 (35th)	Budjerah	Budjerah (EP)
2021 (35th)	Genesis Owusu	Smiling with No Teeth
2021 (35th)	Keith Urban	The Speed of Now Part 1
2021 (35th)	Kylie Minogue	Disco
2021 (35th)	Masked Wolf	"Astronaut in the Ocean"
2021 (35th)	Ngaiire	3
2021 (35th)	Tones and I	Welcome to the Madhouse
2021 (35th)	Vance Joy	"Missing Piece"
2022 (36th)
2022 (36th)	Baker Boy	Gela
2022 (36th)	Budjerah	Conversations
2022 (36th)	Courtney Barnett	Things Take Time, Take Time
2022 (36th)	Daniel Johns	FutureNever
2022 (36th)	Flume	Palaces
2022 (36th)	Julia Jacklin	Pre Pleasure
2022 (36th)	Ruel	"Growing Up Is ___"
2022 (36th)	The Kid Laroi	"Thousand Miles"
2022 (36th)	Thelma Plum	Meanjin
2022 (36th)	Vance Joy	In Our Own Sweet Time
2023 (37th)
2023 (37th)	Troye Sivan	"Rush"
2023 (37th)	Budjerah	"2step" by Ed Sheeran (Feat. Budjerah)
2023 (37th)	Dan Sultan	Dan Sultan
2023 (37th)	Dom Dolla	"Eat Your Man" ft. Nelly Furtado
2023 (37th)	G Flip	Drummer
2023 (37th)	Genesis Owusu	Struggler
2023 (37th)	Jen Cloher	I Am the River, the River Is Me
2023 (37th)	Kylie Minogue	"Padam Padam"
2023 (37th)	Meg Mac	Matter Of Time
2023 (37th)	The Kid Laroi	"Love Again"
2024 (38th)
2024 (38th)	Troye Sivan	Something to Give Each Other
2024 (38th)	Amy Shark	"Sunday Sadness"
2024 (38th)	Angie McMahon	"Light, Dark, Light Again"
2024 (38th)	Dom Dolla	Saving Up
2024 (38th)	Emma Donovan	Till My Song Is Done
2024 (38th)	Kylie Minogue	Tension
2024 (38th)	The Kid Laroi	The First Time [Deluxe Version]
2024 (38th)	Tkay Maidza	Sweet Justice
2024 (38th)	Tones and I	"Beautifully Ordinary"
2024 (38th)	Troy Cassar-Daley	Between the Fires
2025 (39th)
2025 (39th)	Ninajirachi	I Love My Computer
2025 (39th)	Barkaa	Big Tidda
2025 (39th)	Dom Dolla	"Dreamin'"
2025 (39th)	Kylie Minogue	Tension II
2025 (39th)	Mallrat	Light Hit My Face Like a Straight Right
2025 (39th)	Missy Higgins	The Second Act
2025 (39th)	Paul Kelly	Fever Longing Still
2025 (39th)	The Kid Laroi	"How Does It Feel?"
2025 (39th)	Thelma Plum	I'm Sorry, Now Say It Back
2025 (39th)	Young Franco	It's Franky Baby!
2026 (40th)
2026 (40th)	Tame Impala	Deadbeat
2026 (40th)	Baker Boy	Djandjay
2026 (40th)	Boy Soda	Soulstar
2026 (40th)	Ecca Vandal	Looking for People to Unfollow
2026 (40th)	G Flip	Dream Ride
2026 (40th)	Genesis Owusu	Redstar Wu & the Worldwide Scourge
2026 (40th)	Matt Corby	Tragic Magic
2026 (40th)	Miss Kaninna	Blackprint
2026 (40th)	Ninajirachi	"WannaCry"
2026 (40th)	Troye Sivan	She's the Best

== Artists with multiple nominations ==
5 nominations

- The Kid Laroi

4 nominations

- Kylie Minogue

3 nominations

- Budjerah
- Genesis Owusu
- Troye Sivan

2 nominations

- Baker Boy
- Dom Dolla
- Vance Joy
- Ninajirachi
- Thelma Plum
- Amy Shark
- Tones and I
