= Gila Monster / Witchcraft =

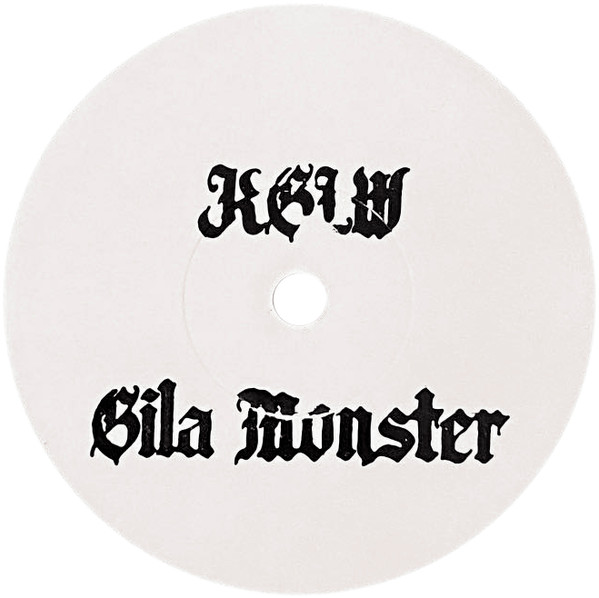

Single by King Gizzard & the Lizard Wizard

from the album PetroDragonic Apocalypse
- A-side: "Gila Monster"
- B-side: "Witchcraft"
- Released: 16 May 2023
- Genre: "Gila Monster": Stoner metal; heavy metal; "Witchcraft": Progressive metal; thrash metal
- Length: 9:38; 4:35 ("Gila Monster"); 5:05 ("Witchcraft")
- Label: KGLW
- Songwriters: Stu Mackenzie; Ambrose Kenny-Smith; Cook Craig; Joey Walker; Michael Cavanagh
- Producer: Stu Mackenzie

King Gizzard & the Lizard Wizard singles chronology
"No Body / Exploding Suns" (2023)	"Gila Monster / Witchcraft" (2023)	"Dragon" (2023)

Music video
- "Gila Monster" on YouTube

"Gila Monster / Witchcraft" is a single released by the Australian psychedelic rock band King Gizzard & the Lizard Wizard consisting of the songs "Gila Monster" and "Witchcraft" from their 24th studio album PetroDragonic Apocalypse, and was released on May 16, 2023. "Witchcraft" follows a group of witches that create a spell to summon a giant monster but is disrupted by a black cat, "Gila Monster" surrounds the monster that was accidentally summoned as it grows to monstrous sizes. The single was physically released as part of a limited run at Gizzard's Los Angeles Record Fair on June 20, 2023, on 7" vinyl. While "Gila Monster" was the primary track, the B-side of the vinyl had the track "Witchcraft".

At the 2023 ARIA Music Awards, Gila Monster's video was nominated for Best Video.

The song "Gila Monster" was featured in the video game Tony Hawk's Pro Skater 3+4.

== Recording ==
"Gila Monster" was first played live in March 2023 and became a part of the band's setlists. It has Stu Mackenzie on lead vocals with keyboardist Ambrose Kenny-Smith doing additional vocals, and the rest of the band appears in the chorus. The full song was released on May 16, 2023, alongside a music video, directed by SPOD.

== Critical reception ==
Gila Monster came out with fairly positive reviews from music critics/outlets like Stereogum, Exclaim!, and MetalSucks. Hesher Keenan, from the latter, says "it's fast, it grooves, and it's got just enough fuzz in the mix to really set it over the edge".

== Personnel ==
- Stu Mackenzie – vocals, guitar
- Ambrose Kenny-Smith – vocals
- Joey Walker – guitar
- Cook Craig – bass
- Michael Cavanagh – drums
