= Stampede (song) =

2026 single by Genesis Owusu

Single by Genesis Owusu

from the album Redstar Wu & the Worldwide Scourge
- Released: 20 February 2026
- Length: 3:09
- Label: Ourness
- Songwriters: Kofi Ansah; Andrew Klippel
- Producers: Dann Hume; Andrew Klippel

Genesis Owusu singles chronology
"Death Cult Zombie" (2025)	"Stampede" (2026)	"Life Keeps Going" (2026)

Music video
- "Stampede" on YouTube

"Stampede" is a song by Ghanaian-Australian singer, Genesis Owusu, released on 20 February 2026 as the second single from Owusu's third studio album Redstar Wu & the Worldwide Scourge.

In September 2026, the song soundtracked Apple Inc.'s campaign for the new iPhone 18 Pro and Pro Max.

At the 2026 ARIA Music Awards, the Isaac Brown directed video, which was filmed in Accra, Ghana, was nominated for Best Video. At the 2026 J Awards, it won Australian Music Video of the Year.

== Critical reception ==
Deb Pelser from Backseat Mafia said "It's abrasive but purposeful, a collision of synth-punk urgency and melodic resolve. Owusu's vocal performance cuts through the distortion with clarity, frustration sharpened into something communal rather than isolating."

Shahzaib Hussain from Clash Magazine said "On 'Stampede' Genesis incites a rhythmic rebellion on an abrasive, ecstatic synth-laden anthem. It's a timely paean to the importance of community in increasingly dislocated times."

Max Mehalchin from Melisma Magazine called it "an anthem of a song, denouncing monarchs, starting riots, and encouraging everyone from the 'left side to the right side…front side to the back' to join in on the stampede and 'fight for the ones you love.'"

Tobias Handke from The Note said "this one goes from zero to 100 quickly, with Owusu dropping thunderous bars and singing over the driving synth beat. There's a real urgency to this one, with Owusu recognising the power of community in these uncertain times."
