= GTFO (Genesis Owusu song) =

2022 single by Genesis Owusu

Single by Genesis Owusu
- Released: 20 July 2022
- Length: 3:20
- Label: Ourness
- Songwriters: Kofi Ansah; Andrew Klippel; Michael Di Francesco; Jono Ma
- Producers: Dann Hume; Andrew Klippel; Jono Ma

Genesis Owusu singles chronology
"Cheque" (2022)	"GTFO" (2022)	"Guap Pop" (2022)

Music video
- "GTFO" on YouTube

"GTFO" is a song by Ghanaian-Australian singer, Genesis Owusu, released on 20 July 2022

At the 2022 ARIA Music Awards, the song was nominated for Best Independent Release and Best Video. At the APRA Music Awards of 2023, the song was shortlisted for Song of the Year.

== Critical reception ==
Ali Gallagher from NME said "It's a slow-burner that sees Owusu delivering introspective verses above a woozy, choral backdrop, before warbled synths and a marching drum-like beat foreground the deceptively triumphant refrain 'Get the fuck out'".

== Track listings ==
Digital download/streaming & 7" Vinyl (OUR7001)

1. "GTFO" – 3:20
