= Redstar Wu & the Worldwide Scourge =

Studio album by Genesis Owusu
- Released: 15 May 2026
- Studios: Hymn Studios, Barry, Wales; Sentir Studio, Sydney; Rancom St Studios, Sydney
- Length: 50:25
- Label: Ourness
- Producer: Dann Hume

Genesis Owusu chronology
Struggler (2023)	Redstar Wu & the Worldwide Scourge (2026)

Singles from Redstar Wu & the Worldwide Scourge
- 1. "Pirate Radio" Released: 12 September 2025; 2. "Death Cult Zombie" Released: 31 October 2025; 3. "Stampede" Released: 20 February 2026; 4. "Life Keeps Going" Released: 24 April 2026

Redstar Wu & the Worldwide Scourge (stylised in all caps) is the third studio album by Australian rapper Genesis Owusu. It was released via Ourness on 15 May 2026. The album was preceded by the release of four singles: "Pirate Radio", "Death Cult Zombie", "Stampede" and "Life Keeps Going".

At the 2026 ARIA Music Awards it was nominated for Album of the Year, Best Independent Release, Best Alternative Release, Best Solo Artist, Best Cover Art and Best Produced Release. At the 2026 J Awards, the album won the Australian Album of the Year. The album was shortlisted for the 2026 Australian Music Prize.

== Composition ==
Upon the album's announcement, Genesis Owusu explained: "I started writing this album because I was seeing so much of the world and watching what was happening." Press material called the writing a "piercing reflection on the political, social and economic flames engulfing many parts of contemporary society." The music blends neo soul with alt-pop, synth-punk, deep funk and Brit rock stylings.

== Release ==
The album's lead single, "Pirate Radio", issued on 12 September 2025, was the artist's first new song in two years. While not released as a single, "Most Normal American Voter:" saw an early release through the video game Skate as part of the game's Early Access soundtrack.

Two more singles followed: "Death Cult Zombie" on 31 October 2025, and "Stampede" on 20 February 2026, before the album's title, cover artwork and track listing was officially announced on 18 March 2026. The album's fourth single, "Life Keeps Going" was released on 24 April 2026.

== Critical reception ==
Professional ratings
Aggregate scores
Source	Rating
AnyDecentMusic?	8.2/10
Metacritic	88/100
Review scores
Source	Rating
DIY	4.5/5 stars
Dork	4/5 stars
The Guardian	5/5 stars
NME	4/5 stars
Pitchfork	7.5/10
The Needle Drop	8/10

According to the review aggregator Metacritic, Redstar Wu & the Worldwide Scourge received "universal acclaim" based on a weighted average score of 88 out of 100 from ten critic scores. The review aggregator Any Decent Music gave the album a weighted average score of 8.2 out of 10 from eight critic scores.

== Track listing ==
Redstar Wu & the Worldwide Scourge track listing
No.	Title	Writer(s)	Length
1.	"Pirate Radio"	Kofi Owusu-Ansah; Dann Hume	2:54
2.	"Stampede"	Owusu-Ansah; Hume	3:09
3.	"Hellstar" (with Duckwrth)	Owusu-Ansah; Hume; Jared Lee	3:52
4.	"Falling Both Ways" (with Ladyhawke)	Owusu-Ansah; Hume; Pip Brown	3:13
5.	"The Worldwide Scourge"	Owusu-Ansah; Hume	4:50
6.	"Blessed Are the Meek"	Owusu-Ansah; Hume	3:50
7.	"Life Keeps Going"	Owusu-Ansah; Felix Bloxsom; Andrew Klippel; Kim Moyes	3:39
8.	"Most Normal American Voter:"	Owusu-Ansah; Hume	2:36
9.	"Death Cult Zombie"	Owusu-Ansah; Hume	3:36
10.	"Situations"	Owusu-Ansah; Kirin J. Callinan; Jonti Danilewitz; Michael Di Francesco; Hume; Julian Sudek	3:34
11.	"4Life"	Owusu-Ansah; Hume	4:10
12.	"Runnin Outta Time"	Owusu-Ansah; Hume	3:34
13.	"Big Dog"	Owusu-Ansah; Hume	3:36
14.	"One4All"	Owusu-Ansah; Hume	3:45
Total length:			50:25

== Personnel ==
- Dann Hume – producer, engineer, mixer
- Andrew Klippel – producer ("Life Keeps Going", "Situations")
- Simon Cohen – engineer ("Falling Both Ways", "Life Keeps Going", Situations")
- Murray Lake – engineer ("Life Keeps Going")
- Pip Brown – engineer ("Falling Both Ways")
- Blain Cunneen – engineer ("Situations")
- Joe Carra – mastering

== Charts ==
Chart performance for Redstar Wu & the Worldwide Scourge
Chart (2026)	Peak position
Australian Albums (ARIA)	3
UK Album Downloads (Official Charts)	69
