= ARIA Award for Album of the Year =

Australian music award

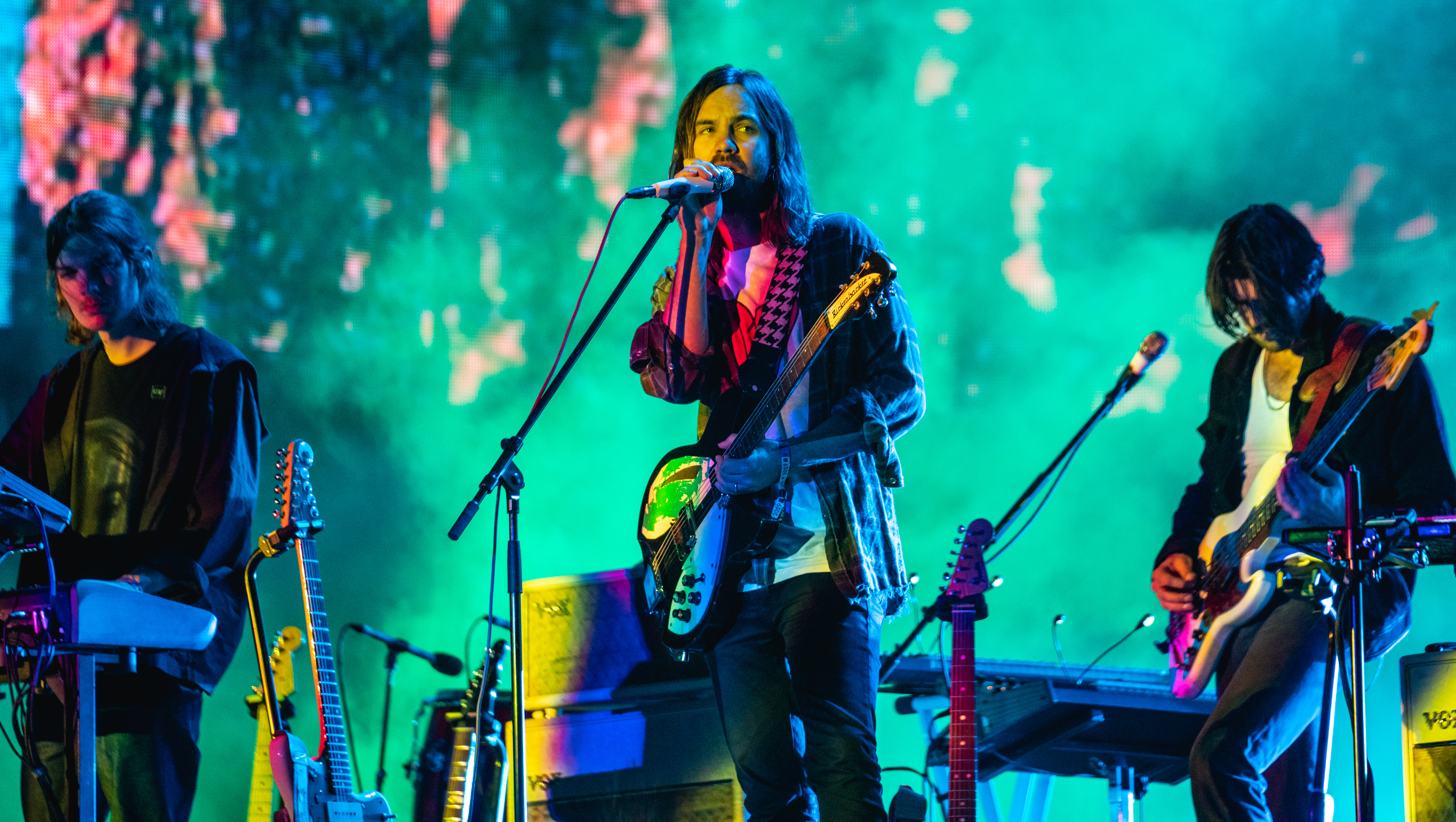
- 2026 winner Tame Impala
- Country: Australia
- Presented by: Australian Recording Industry Association (ARIA)
- First award: 1987
- Currently held by: Tame Impala, Deadbeat (2026)

Highlights
- Most wins: Tame Impala (4)
- Most nominations: John Farnham, Silverchair and Tame Impala (5 each)
- Website: ariaawards.com.au

The ARIA Music Award for Album of the Year is an award presented at the annual ARIA Music Awards, which recognises "the many achievements of Aussie artists across all music genres", since 1987. It is handed out by the Australian Recording Industry Association (ARIA), an organisation whose aim is "to advance the interests of the Australian record industry." The award is handed out to an Australian group or solo artist who have had an album appear in the ARIA Top 100 Albums Chart between the eligibility period, and is voted for by a judging academy, which consists of 1000 members from different areas of the music industry. Tame Impala has the most wins with four, while the only other artist with multiple wins in this category is Powderfinger, who have won three times. John Farnham, Silverchair and Tame Impala are tied for the most nominations with five each.

== Winners and nominees ==
In the following table, the winner is highlighted in a separate colour, and in boldface; the nominees are those that are not highlighted or in boldface.

Winner marked in a separate colour

Year	Winner(s)	Album Title
**1987** (1st)
**1987** (1st)	**John Farnham**	**Whispering Jack**
**1987** (1st)	Crowded House	Crowded House
**1987** (1st)	Hunters & Collectors	Human Frailty
**1987** (1st)	Paul Kelly & the Coloured Girls	Gossip
**1987** (1st)	Spy vs Spy	A.O. Mod. TV. Vers.
**1988** (2nd)	**Icehouse**	**Man of Colours**
**1989** (3rd)
**1989** (3rd)	**Crowded House**	**Temple of Low Men**
**1989** (3rd)	1927	...ish
**1989** (3rd)	Big Pig	Bonk
**1989** (3rd)	The Black Sorrows	Hold On To Me
**1989** (3rd)	John Farnham	Age of Reason
**1990** (4th)
**1990** (4th)	**Ian Moss**	**Matchbook**
**1990** (4th)	Kate Ceberano	Brave
**1990** (4th)	Stephen Cummings	A New Kind of Blue
**1990** (4th)	Hunters & Collectors	Ghost Nation
**1990** (4th)	Paul Kelly & The Messengers	So Much Water So Close To Home
**1991** (5th)
**1991** (5th)	**Midnight Oil**	**Blue Sky Mining**
**1991** (5th)	The Black Sorrows	Harley and Rose
**1991** (5th)	John Farnham	Chain Reaction
**1991** (5th)	INXS	X
**1991** (5th)	Margaret Urlich	Safety in Numbers
**1992** (6th)
**1992** (6th)	**Baby Animals**	**Baby Animals**
**1992** (6th)	Crowded House	Woodface
**1992** (6th)	Deborah Conway	String of Pearls
**1992** (6th)	Died Pretty	Doughboy Hollow
**1992** (6th)	Jimmy Barnes	Soul Deep
**1993** (7th)
**1993** (7th)	**Diesel**	**Hepfidelity**
**1993** (7th)	Ed Kuepper	Black Ticket Day
**1993** (7th)	Hunters & Collectors	Cut
**1993** (7th)	Rockmelons	Form 1 Planet
**1993** (7th)	Wendy Matthews	Lily
**1994** (8th)
**1994** (8th)	**The Cruel Sea**	**The Honeymoon Is Over**
**1994** (8th)	The Badloves	Get On Board
**1994** (8th)	Crowded House	Together Alone
**1994** (8th)	Diesel	The Lobbyist
**1994** (8th)	John Farnham	Then Again
**1995** (9th)
**1995** (9th)	**Tina Arena**	**Don't Ask**
**1995** (9th)	Christine Anu	Stylin' Up
**1995** (9th)	The Cruel Sea	Three Legged Dog
**1995** (9th)	Silverchair	Frogstomp
**1995** (9th)	You Am I	Hi Fi Way
**1996** (10th)
**1996** (10th)	**You Am I**	**Hourly, Daily**
**1996** (10th)	Finn	Finn
**1996** (10th)	John Farnham	Romeo's Heart
**1996** (10th)	Nick Cave and the Bad Seeds	Murder Ballads
**1996** (10th)	Regurgitator	Tu-Plang
**1997** (11th)
**1997** (11th)	**Savage Garden**	**Savage Garden**
**1997** (11th)	Nick Cave and the Bad Seeds	The Boatman's Call
**1997** (11th)	Powderfinger	Double Allergic
**1997** (11th)	Silverchair	Freak Show
**1997** (11th)	Spiderbait	Ivy and the Big Apples
**1998** (12th)
**1998** (12th)	**Regurgitator**	**Unit**
**1998** (12th)	Kylie Minogue	Impossible Princess
**1998** (12th)	Natalie Imbruglia	Left of the Middle
**1998** (12th)	The Whitlams	Eternal Nightcap
**1998** (12th)	You Am I	#4 Record
**1999** (13th)
**1999** (13th)	**Powderfinger**	**Internationalist**
**1999** (13th)	Ben Lee	Breathing Tornados
**1999** (13th)	The Living End	The Living End
**1999** (13th)	Silverchair	Neon Ballroom
**1999** (13th)	Spiderbait	Grand Slam
**2000** (14th)
**2000** (14th)	**Killing Heidi**	**Reflector**
**2000** (14th)	Alex Lloyd	Black the Sun
**2000** (14th)	David Bridie	Act of Free Choice
**2000** (14th)	Savage Garden	Affirmation
**2000** (14th)	Shihad	The General Electric
**2001** (15th)
**2001** (15th)	**Powderfinger**	**Odyssey Number Five**
**2001** (15th)	The Avalanches	Since I Left You
**2001** (15th)	Kylie Minogue	Light Years
**2001** (15th)	Something for Kate	Echolalia
**2001** (15th)	You Am I	Dress Me Slowly
**2002** (16th)
**2002** (16th)	**Kasey Chambers**	**Barricades & Brickwalls**
**2002** (16th)	Alex Lloyd	Watching Angels Mend
**2002** (16th)	George	Polyserena
**2002** (16th)	Kylie Minogue	Fever
**2002** (16th)	Silverchair	Diorama
**2003** (17th)
**2003** (17th)	**Powderfinger**	**Vulture Street**
**2003** (17th)	Delta Goodrem	Innocent Eyes
**2003** (17th)	The Sleepy Jackson	Lovers
**2003** (17th)	Something for Kate	The Official Fiction
**2003** (17th)	The Waifs	Up All Night
**2004** (18th)
**2004** (18th)	**Jet**	**Get Born**
**2004** (18th)	The Dissociatives	The Dissociatives
**2004** (18th)	Eskimo Joe	A Song Is a City
**2004** (18th)	The John Butler Trio	Sunrise Over Sea
**2004** (18th)	Kasey Chambers	Wayward Angel
**2005** (19th)
**2005** (19th)	**Missy Higgins**	**The Sound of White**
**2005** (19th)	Ben Lee	Awake Is the New Sleep
**2005** (19th)	Evermore	Dreams
**2005** (19th)	Keith Urban	Be Here
**2005** (19th)	Sarah Blasko	The Overture & the Underscore
**2006** (20th)
**2006** (20th)	**Bernard Fanning**	**Tea & Sympathy**
**2006** (20th)	Augie March	Moo, You Bloody Choir
**2006** (20th)	Eskimo Joe	Black Fingernails, Red Wine
**2006** (20th)	The Sleepy Jackson	Personality – One Was a Spider, One Was a Bird
**2006** (20th)	Wolfmother	Wolfmother
**2007** (21st)
**2007** (21st)	**Silverchair**	**Young Modern**
**2007** (21st)	Gotye	Mixed Blood
**2007** (21st)	The John Butler Trio	Grand National
**2007** (21st)	Powderfinger	Dream Days at the Hotel Existence
**2007** (21st)	Sneaky Sound System	Sneaky Sound System
**2008** (22nd)
**2008** (22nd)	**The Presets**	**Apocalypso**
**2008** (22nd)	Geoffrey Gurrumul Yunupingu	Gurrumul
**2008** (22nd)	Kasey Chambers and Shane Nicholson	Rattlin' Bones
**2008** (22nd)	The Living End	White Noise
**2008** (22nd)	Nick Cave and the Bad Seeds	Dig, Lazarus, Dig!!!
**2009** (23rd)
**2009** (23rd)	**Empire of the Sun**	**Walking on a Dream**
**2009** (23rd)	AC/DC	Black Ice
**2009** (23rd)	Eskimo Joe	Inshalla
**2009** (23rd)	Sarah Blasko	As Day Follows Night
**2009** (23rd)	The Temper Trap	Conditions
**2010** (24th)
**2010** (24th)	**Angus & Julia Stone**	**Down the Way**
**2010** (24th)	Birds of Tokyo	Birds of Tokyo
**2010** (24th)	Sia	We Are Born
**2010** (24th)	Tame Impala	InnerSpeaker
**2010** (24th)	Washington	I Believe You Liar
**2011** (25th)
**2011** (25th)	**Boy & Bear**	**Moonfire**
**2011** (25th)	Cut Copy	Zonoscope
**2011** (25th)	Eskimo Joe	Ghosts of the Past
**2011** (25th)	Geoffrey Gurrumul Yunupingu	Rrakala
**2011** (25th)	Grinderman	Grinderman 2
**2012** (26th)
**2012** (26th)	**Gotye**	**Making Mirrors**
**2012** (26th)	360	Falling & Flying
**2012** (26th)	Missy Higgins	The Ol' Razzle Dazzle
**2012** (26th)	The Jezabels	Prisoner
**2012** (26th)	The Temper Trap	The Temper Trap
**2013** (27th)
**2013** (27th)	**Tame Impala**	**Lonerism**
**2013** (27th)	Birds of Tokyo	March Fires
**2013** (27th)	Flume	Flume
**2013** (27th)	Guy Sebastian	Armageddon
**2013** (27th)	Nick Cave and the Bad Seeds	Push the Sky Away
**2014** (28th)
**2014** (28th)	**Sia**	**1000 Forms of Fear**
**2014** (28th)	Chet Faker	Built on Glass
**2014** (28th)	Dan Sultan	Blackbird
**2014** (28th)	Jessica Mauboy	Beautiful
**2014** (28th)	Sheppard	Bombs Away
**2015** (29th)
**2015** (29th)	**Tame Impala**	**Currents**
**2015** (29th)	Courtney Barnett	Sometimes I Sit and Think, and Sometimes I Just Sit
**2015** (29th)	Flight Facilities	Down to Earth
**2015** (29th)	Hermitude	Dark Night Sweet Light
**2015** (29th)	Vance Joy	Dream Your Life Away
**2016** (30th)
**2016** (30th)	**Flume**	**Skin**
**2016** (30th)	RÜFÜS	Bloom
**2016** (30th)	Sia	This Is Acting
**2016** (30th)	The Avalanches	Wildflower
**2016** (30th)	Troye Sivan	Blue Neighbourhood
**2017** (31st)
**2017** (31st)	**Gang of Youths**	**Go Farther in Lightness**
**2017** (31st)	A.B. Original	Reclaim Australia
**2017** (31st)	Amy Shark	Night Thinker
**2017** (31st)	Illy	Two Degrees
**2017** (31st)	Paul Kelly	Life Is Fine
**2018** (32nd)
**2018** (32nd)	**Amy Shark**	**Love Monster**
**2018** (32nd)	Courtney Barnett	Tell Me How You Really Feel
**2018** (32nd)	Gurrumul	Djarimirri (Child of the Rainbow)
**2018** (32nd)	Pnau	Changa
**2018** (32nd)	Troye Sivan	Bloom
**2019** (33rd)
**2019** (33rd)	**Dean Lewis**	**A Place We Knew**
**2019** (33rd)	Hilltop Hoods	The Great Expanse
**2019** (33rd)	Rüfüs Du Sol	Solace
**2019** (33rd)	The Teskey Brothers	Run Home Slow
**2019** (33rd)	Thelma Plum	Better in Blak
**2020** (34th)
**2020** (34th)	**Tame Impala**	**The Slow Rush**
**2020** (34th)	DMA's	The Glow
**2020** (34th)	Jessica Mauboy	Hilda
**2020** (34th)	Lime Cordiale	14 Steps to a Better You
**2020** (34th)	Sampa the Great	The Return
**2021** (35th)
**2021** (35th)	**Genesis Owusu**	**Smiling with No Teeth**
**2021** (35th)	Amy Shark	Cry Forever
**2021** (35th)	Midnight Oil	The Makarrata Project
**2021** (35th)	The Avalanches	We Will Always Love You
**2021** (35th)	Tones and I	Welcome to the Madhouse
**2022** (36th)
**2022** (36th)	**Baker Boy**	**Gela**
**2022** (36th)	Amyl and the Sniffers	Comfort to Me
**2022** (36th)	Gang of Youths	Angel in Realtime
**2022** (36th)	King Stingray	King Stingray
**2022** (36th)	Rüfüs Du Sol	Surrender
**2023** (37th)
**2023** (37th)	**Genesis Owusu**	**Struggler**
**2023** (37th)	DMA's	How Many Dreams?
**2023** (37th)	G Flip	Drummer
**2023** (37th)	Matt Corby	Everything's Fine
**2023** (37th)	The Teskey Brothers	The Winding Way
**2024** (38th)
**2024** (38th)	**Troye Sivan**	**Something to Give Each Other**
**2024** (38th)	Amy Shark	Sunday Sadness
**2024** (38th)	Angie McMahon	Light, Dark, Light Again
**2024** (38th)	Kylie Minogue	Tension
**2024** (38th)	Royel Otis	Pratts & Pain
**2025** (39th)
**2025** (39th)	**Amyl and the Sniffers**	**Cartoon Darkness**
**2025** (39th)	Missy Higgins	The Second Act
**2025** (39th)	Ninajirachi	I Love My Computer
**2025** (39th)	Rüfüs Du Sol	Inhale / Exhale
**2025** (39th)	Thelma Plum	I'm Sorry, Now Say It Back
**2026** (40th)
**2026** (40th)	**Tame Impala**	**Deadbeat**
**2026** (40th)	Boy Soda	Soulstar
**2026** (40th)	DMA's	DMA's
**2026** (40th)	Ecca Vandal	Looking for People to Unfollow
**2026** (40th)	Genesis Owusu	Redstar Wu & the Worldwide Scourge

== Artists with multiple nominations ==
5 nominations

- John Farnham
- Silverchair
- Tame Impala

4 nominations

- Crowded House
- Eskimo Joe
- Kylie Minogue
- Nick Cave and the Bad Seeds
- Powderfinger
- Rüfüs Du Sol
- Amy Shark
- You Am I

3 nominations

- The Avalanches
- Kasey Chambers
- DMA's
- Missy Higgins
- Hunters & Collectors
- Paul Kelly
- Genesis Owusu
- Sia
- Troye Sivan
- Luke Steele (Note: Two as a member of the Sleepy Jackson and one as a member of Empire of the Sun.)
- Geoffrey Gurrumul Yunupingu

2 nominations

- Amyl and the Sniffers
- Courtney Barnett
- Birds of Tokyo
- The Black Sorrows
- Sarah Blasko
- The Cruel Sea
- Diesel
- Flume
- Gang of Youths
- Gotye
- John Butler Trio
- Ben Lee
- Nick Littlemore (Note: One each as a member of Empire of the Sun and Pnau.)
- The Living End
- Alex Lloyd
- Jessica Mauboy
- Midnight Oil
- Thelma Plum
- Savage Garden
- The Sleepy Jackson
- Something for Kate
- Spiderbait
- The Temper Trap
- The Teskey Brothers
