= ARIA Award for Music Teacher of the Year =

Annual Australian music industry award

- Country: Australia
- Presented by: Australian Recording Industry Association (ARIA)
- First award: 2017
- Final award: 2024
- Currently held by: Nathaniel Miller (2024)
- Website: aria.com.au/music-teacher/

The ARIA Music Award for Music Teacher of the Year was a popular-voted award presented at the annual ARIA Music Awards, "to recognise music teachers for their passion and hard work in providing Australian children with a better education and the chance to play and enjoy music." The category was first presented in 2017, four short-listed nominees were announced in October and public voting determined the winner in late November. The teacher's educational institute is acknowledged in the announcement of the winner. The award has not been given since the 2024 ceremony.

== Winners and nominees ==
In the following table, the winner is highlighted in a separate colour, and in boldface; the nominees are those that are not highlighted or in boldface.

Winner marked in a separate colour

Year	Winner	School
**2017** (31st)
**2017** (31st)	**Renee McCarthy**	**Woodcroft College**
**2017** (31st)	Julie Layt	Crescent Lagoon State School, West Rockhampton, Queensland
**2017** (31st)	Stephen Mcewan	Bellarine Secondary College
**2017** (31st)	Alex Manton	Asquith Girls High School
**2018** (32nd)
**2018** (32nd)	**Scott Maxwell**	**Grant High School**
**2018** (32nd)	Becky Hall	Education Institute, Royal Children's Hospital
**2018** (32nd)	Dean Harawira	Nerang State High School
**2018** (32nd)	Deborah Skelton	Caladenia Primary School, Canning Vale, Western Australia
**2019** (33rd)
**2019** (33rd)	**Antonio Chiappetta**	**St Andrews College**
**2019** (33rd)	Bel Skinner	North Regional TAFE
**2019** (33rd)	Julie Rennick	Gunnedah Conservatorium, Gunnedah
**2019** (33rd)	Lee Strickland	Narbethong State Special School
**2020** (34th)
**2020** (34th)	**Sarah Donnelley**	**Wilcannia Central School, Wilcannia**
**2020** (34th)	Thomas Fienberg	Evans High School, Blacktown
**2020** (34th)	Kathryn McLennan	Virginia State School, Virginia, Queensland
**2020** (34th)	CJ Shaw	Palmerston District Primary School, Palmerston, Australian Capital Territory
**2021** (35th)
**2021** (35th)	**Zoë Barry**	**Sacred Heart School, Fitzroy**
**2021** (35th)	Ashley Baxter	Pimlico State High School
**2021** (35th)	Aaron Silver	Wodonga Primary School, Wodonga
**2021** (35th)	Daniel Wilson	Star Struck, Newcastle
**2022** (36th)
**2022** (36th)	**Matt Orchard**	**Apollo Bay P-12 College, Apollo Bay VIC**
**2022** (36th)	David Collins-White	Haberfield Public School, Haberfield NSW
**2022** (36th)	Jane Nicholas	Willandra Primary School, Seville Grove WA
**2022** (36th)	Kath Dunn	Wollondilly Public School, Goulburn NSW
**2023** (37th)
**2023** (37th)	**Sue Lowry**	**Southport Special School, Southport QLD**
**2023** (37th)	Hank Lewerissa	Upper Coomera State College, Upper Coomera QLD
**2023** (37th)	Jessie Copeman	Ainslie School, Braddon ACT
**2023** (37th)	Peter Earl	Numerous schools in the Blue Mountains/Western Sydney region, Bullaburra NSW
**2024** (38th)
**2024** (38th)	**Nathaniel Miller**	**Bulman School, Bulman Community, Arnhem Land, NT**
**2024** (38th)	Casey Allen	PLC Sydney, Croydon, Eora Nation, NSW
**2024** (38th)	Hayley Wedding	Seaview High School, Seacombe Heights, Kaurna Land, SA
**2024** (38th)	Susan Sukkar	Petersham Public School, Lewisham, Eora Nation, NSW
