= 2022 ARIA Music Awards =

Annual Australian music award

- Date: 24 November 2022
- Venue: Hordern Pavilion, Sydney, New South Wales
- Hosted by: Natalie Imbruglia, G Flip, Ruel

Highlights
- Most wins: Baker Boy (5)
- Most nominations: Rüfüs Du Sol (7)
- Website: ariaawards.com.au

Television/radio coverage
- Networks
- Nine Network; YouTube

The 2022 ARIA Music Awards were the 36th Annual Australian Recording Industry Association Music Awards (generally known as the ARIA Music Awards or simply the ARIAs) and consist of a series of awards, including the 2022 ARIA Artisan Awards, ARIA Fine Arts Awards and the ARIA Awards. The ARIA Awards ceremony occurred on 24 November 2022, broadcast on Nine Network and live-streamed via YouTube from Hordern Pavilion, Sydney. Modifications were Best Artist became Best Solo Artist, Best Dance/Electronic Release replaced Best Dance Release, Mix Engineer – Best Mixed Album instead of Engineer of the Year and Producer – Best Produced Album changed from Producer of the Year. Entries for all categories closed on 12 August 2022 and final nominees were announced on 12 October.

Hosts for the show were announced as Natalie Imbruglia and Lewis Capaldi on 14 October, however on 2 November Capaldi withdrew "due to unforeseen scheduling issues". His replacements G Flip and Ruel were announced on 14 November. Brooke Boney hosted the Pre-Show and also presented 15 trophies. Ceremony performers were named on 16 November, included were tributes for ARIA Hall of Fame inductees who had died during the year: Olivia Newton-John (1948–2022), Archie Roach (1956–2022) and Judith Durham (1943–2022). Due to those tributes this year's ceremony had no new ARIA Hall of Fame inductions, for the second consecutive year. Baker Boy won the most trophies with five from six nominations, while Rüfüs Du Sol had the most nominations at seven taking home one.

== Performers ==
The tribute performance for Archie Roach was introduced by Peter Garrett and Briggs.

Performers and songs for the ARIA Awards ceremony
Artist(s)	Song(s)	Ref.
Rüfüs Du Sol	"On My Knees"	
Baker Boy	"Meditjin"	
Vance Joy	"Clarity"	
Flume; May-a	"Say Nothing"	
Amyl and the Sniffers	"Guided by Angels"	
Peking Duk; Circa Waves	"Spend It"	
Natalie Imbruglia; Kye; Peking Duk; Tones and I	Tribute to Olivia Newton-John "Hopelessly Devoted to You" "Xanadu" "You're the One That I Want"	
Budjerah; Jessica Mauboy; Thelma Plum	Tribute to Archie Roach "One Song"	
Casey Donovan; Dami Im	Tribute to Judith Durham "I'll Never Find Another You" "The Carnival Is Over"	

== Presenters ==
Presenters and awards for the ARIA Awards ceremony
Artist(s)	Award(s)	Ref.
Brooke Boney	Best Adult Contemporary Album, Best Children's Album, Best Classical Album, Best Country Album, Best Rock Album, Best Dance/Electronic Release, Best Jazz Album, Best Blues & Roots Album, Best Hard Rock/Heavy Metal Album, Best World Music Album, Best Original Soundtrack or Musical Theatre Cast Album, Best Cover Art, Mix Engineer – Best Mixed Album, Best International Artist	
Brooke Boney, Ellie Goulding	Best Video	
Natalie Imbruglia, Ruel	Song of the Year	
Ayesha Madon, Ruel	Best Pop Release, Producer – Best Produced Album	
Troy Cassar-Daley, Becca Hatch	Best Independent Release	
Genesis Owusu, G Flip	Album of the Year	
Illy, Flex Mami	Best Soul/R&B Release	
Jerome Farah, Kye	Best Hip Hop/Rap Release	
Josh Teskey, Montaigne	Best Group	
Lime Cordiale, G Fip	Best Solo Artist	
Matt Gudinski	Michael Gudinski Breakthrough Artist	
Peking Duk, Tones and I	Best Australian Live Act	
The Wiggles	Music Teacher of the Year	

== Nominees and winners ==
Nominations were announced on 12 October 2022 by Nine Network's entertainment reporter Brooke Boney via ARIA's YouTube channel. Winners of awards during the Pre-Show were also announced by Boney. Winners shown bolded and at top of category, other final nominees are shown in plain.

=== ARIA Awards ===
Full list of nominees
Album of the Year	Best Solo Artist
**Baker Boy** – **Gela**; Amyl and the Sniffers – Comfort to Me; Gang of Youths – Angel in Realtime; King Stingray – King Stingray; Rüfüs Du Sol – Surrender	**Baker Boy** – **Gela**; Budjerah – Conversations; Courtney Barnett – Things Take Time, Take Time; Daniel Johns – FutureNever; Flume – Palaces; Julia Jacklin – Pre Pleasure; Ruel – "Growing Up Is"; The Kid Laroi – "Thousand Miles"; Thelma Plum – Meanjin; Vance Joy – In Our Own Sweet Time
Best Group	Michael Gudinski Breakthrough Artist
**Amyl and the Sniffers** – **Comfort to Me**; Gang of Youths – Angel in Realtime; King Stingray – King Stingray; Midnight Oil – Resist; Rüfüs Du Sol – Surrender	**King Stingray** – **King Stingray**; Beddy Rays – Beddy Rays; Bella Taylor Smith – "Look Me in the Eyes"; Harvey Sutherland – Boy; Luude – "Down Under" (featuring Colin Hay)
Best Adult Contemporary Album	Best Blues & Roots Album
**Julia Jacklin** – **Pre Pleasure**; Alex the Astronaut – How to Grow a Sunflower Underwater; Missy Higgins – Total Control; Vance Joy – In Our Own Sweet Time; Vika and Linda – The Wait	**William Crighton** – **Water and Dust**; Charlie Collins – Undone; The Bamboos – Hard Up; The Teskey Brothers with Orchestra Victoria – Live at Hamer Hall; Thornbird – Thornbird
Best Children's Album	Best Country Album
**The Wiggles** – **ReWiggled**; Benny Time – Benny and Friends; Teeny Tiny Stevies – How to be Creative; The Beanies – Let's Go!; Van-Anh Nguyen – The Princess and the Piano	**Casey Barnes** – **Light It Up**; Adam Brand – All or Nothing; Amber Lawrence – Living for the Highlights; Andy Golledge – Strength of a Queen; Georgia State Line – In Colour
Best Dance/Electronic Release	Best Hard Rock/Heavy Metal Album
**Luude** – **"Down Under"** (featuring **Colin Hay**); Confidence Man – Tilt; Flume – Palaces; Harvey Sutherland – Boy; Rüfüs Du Sol – Surrender	**The Chats** – **Get Fucked**; Dune Rats – Real Rare Whale; Northlane – Obsidian; Shihad – Old Gods; Thornhill – Heroine
Best Hip Hop/Rap Release	Best Independent Release
**Baker Boy** – **Gela**; Barkaa – Blak Matriarchy; Chillinit – Family Ties; Day1 – "Mbappé" (featuring Kahukx); The Kid Laroi and Fivio Foreign – "Paris to Tokyo"	**Archie Roach** – **"One Song"**; Ball Park Music – Weirder & Weirder; Courtney Barnett – Things Take Time, Take Time; Genesis Owusu – "GTFO"; Julia Jacklin – Pre Pleasure
Best Pop Release	Best Rock Album
**The Kid Laroi** – **"Thousand Miles"**; Flume – "Say Nothing" (featuring May-a); Rüfüs Du Sol – "On My Knees"; Thelma Plum – Meanjin; Vance Joy – "Clarity"	**Amyl and the Sniffers** – **Comfort to Me**; Ball Park Music – Weirder & Weirder; Gang of Youths – Angel in Realtime; King Stingray – King Stingray; Spacey Jane – Here Comes Everybody
Best Soul/R&B Release
**Budjerah** – **Conversations**; Emma Donovan & the Putbacks – Under These Streets; Kian – Shine; Vanessa Amorosi – City of Angels

=== Public voted ===
Song of the Year	Best Video
**Tones and I** – **"Cloudy Day"**; Clinton Kane – "I Guess I'm in Love"; Dean Lewis – "Hurtless"; Flume – "Say Nothing" (featuring May-a); Joji – "Glimpse of Us"; Jolyon Petch – "Dreams" (featuring Reigan); Luude – "Down Under" (featuring Colin Hay); Rüfüs Du Sol – "On My Knees"; The Kid Laroi – "Thousand Miles"; Vance Joy – "Clarity"	**William Bleakley** for **Vance Joy** – **"Every Side of You"**; Joe Neathway for Lime Cordiale – "Apple Crumble"; John Angus Stewart for Amyl and the Sniffers – "Hertz"; Julia Jacklin for Julia Jacklin – "Lydia Wears a Cross"; Katzki for Rüfüs Du Sol – "I Don't Wanna Leave"; Macario de Souza for Baker Boy – "Wish You Well" (featuring Bernard Fanning); Michael Hill for Flume – "Say Nothing" (featuring May-a); Peter Hume for Luude – "Down Under" (featuring Colin Hay); Selina Miles for Barkaa – "Blak Matriarchy"; Uncle Friendly (Rhett Wade-Ferrell) for Genesis Owusu – "GTFO"
Best Australian Live Act	Best International Artist
**The Wiggles** – **The OG Wiggles Reunion / Fruit Salad TV Big Show Tour**; Amy Shark – See U Somewhere Australia Tour 2022; Amyl and the Sniffers – Comfort to Me Tour 2022; Baker Boy – Gela Tour; Budjerah – The Conversations Australian Tour; Gang of Youths – Angel in Realtime; Genesis Owusu – Genesis Owusu & the Black Dog Band; Midnight Oil – Resist. The Final Tour. 2022; The Kid Laroi – End of the World Tour; Thelma Plum – The Meanjin Tour	**Harry Styles** – **Harry's House**; ABBA – Voyage; Adele – 30; Billie Eilish – Happier Than Ever; Drake – Certified Lover Boy; Ed Sheeran – =; Jack Harlow – Come Home the Kids Miss You; Lil Nas X – Montero; Post Malone – Twelve Carat Toothache; Taylor Swift – Red (Taylor's Version)
Music Teacher of the Year
**Matt Orchard** (Apollo Bay P-12 College, Apollo Bay VIC); David Collins-White (Haberfield Public School, Haberfield NSW); Jane Nicholas (Willandra Primary School, Seville Grove WA); Kath Dunn (Wollondilly Public School, Goulburn NSW)

=== Fine Arts Awards ===
Best Classical Album
- **Melbourne Symphony Orchestra**, **Sir Andrew Davis** – **The Enchanted Loom: Orchestral Works by Carl Vine**
  - Amy Dickson, Colin Currie, Lothar Koenigs, Yvonne Kenny, David Zinman, Sydney Symphony Orchestra, Markus Stenz, Melbourne Symphony Orchestra – Ross Edwards: Frog and Star Cycle / Symphonies 2 & 3
  - Lachlan Skipworth – Chamber Works, Vol. 2
  - Luke Howard – All of Us
  - Tamara Anna Cislowska and Guests – Duet
Best Jazz Album
- **Mildlife** – **Live from South Channel Island**
  - Barney McAll – Precious Energy
  - Mike Nock, Hamish Stuart, Julien Wilson, Jonathan Zwartz – Another Dance
  - Sam Anning – Oaatchapai
  - Springtime – Springtime
Best World Music Album
- **Joseph Tawadros** with **William Barton** – **History Has a Heartbeat**
  - Australian Art Orchestra, Daniel Wilfred, Sunny Kim, Peter Knight, Aviva Endean – Hand to Earth
  - Mista Savona – Havana Meets Kingston Part 2
  - Parvyn – Sa
  - William Barton and Véronique Serret – Heartland
Best Original Soundtrack or Musical Theatre Cast Album
- **Australian Chamber Orchestra** and **Richard Tognetti** – **River (Original Motion Picture Soundtrack)**
  - Brett Aplin – No Mercy, No Remorse (Original Score)
  - In Hearts Wake – Green Is the New Black
  - Maria Alfonsine with Itunu Pepper – Akoni (Original Motion Picture Soundtrack)
  - Matteo Zingales – A Fire Inside (Original Motion Picture Soundtrack)

=== Artisan Awards ===
Producer – Best Produced Album
- **Rüfüs Du Sol** for **Rüfüs Du Sol** – **Surrender**
  - Amyl and the Sniffers, Dan Luscombe for Amyl and the Sniffers – Comfort to Me
  - Courtney Barnett, Stella Mozgawa for Courtney Barnett – Things Take Time, Take Time
  - Flume for Flume – Palaces
  - Pip Norman, Rob Amoruso, Morgan Jones, Carl Dimataga, Willie Tafa, Jerome Farah for Baker Boy – Gela
Mix Engineer – Best Mixed Album
- **Pip Norman**, **Andrei Eremin**, **Dave Hammer** for **Baker Boy** – **Gela**
  - Cassian for Rüfüs Du Sol – Surrender
  - Dann Hume, Eric J Dubowsky for Budjerah – Conversations
  - Eric J Dubowsky for Flume – Palaces
  - Paul McKercher for Ball Park Music – Weirder & Weirder
Best Cover Art
- **Adnate** for **Baker Boy** – **Gela**
  - Giulia Giannini McGauran for Alex the Astronaut – How to Grow a Sunflower Underwater
  - Jonathan Zawada for Flume – Palaces
  - Kayla Flett, Gabi Coulthurst, Dimathaya Burarrwanga for King Stingray – King Stingray
  - Seshanka Samarajiwa, Zain Ayub, Tasman Keith for Tasman Keith – A Colour Undone
