= Mick Dick =

Australian dub musician

- Origin: Australia
- Genres: Dub
- Website: www.mickdick.com

Mick Dick is an Australian dub musician.He was nominated for the 2023 ARIA Award for Best World Music Album for the album ID of RA. The album is a double album and is a tribute to Sun Ra. His earlier album 10 Dubnamic Hits take 1970's Australian songs and reworks them with dub reggae rhythms, such as Daddy Cool's "Come Back Again" redone as "Dub Back Again". Other works include providing improvisational music as part of performance art work, such as with Kellie O'Dempsey in the shows Paper Jam Roll, Draw/Delay and Bloom.

== Discography ==
=== Albums ===
- Is Dub. Is Good. (2018)
- Dub Day Afternoon (2019)
- Listen for Dub Tone (2020)
- Dirty Dubs Done Dirt Cheap (2021)
- 10 Dubnamic Hits (2021)
- Id of RA (2023)

== Awards and nominations ==
=== ARIA Music Awards ===
The ARIA Music Awards are presented annually from 1987 by the Australian Recording Industry Association (ARIA).

Year	Nominee / work	Award	Result	Ref.
2023	Id of RA	Best World Music Album	Nominated	
