= 2023 ARIA Music Awards =

Annual Australian music award

- Date: 15 November 2023
- Venue: Hordern Pavilion, Sydney, New South Wales
- Hosted by: Brooke Boney, Tommy Little

Highlights
- Most wins: Troye Sivan (4)
- Most nominations: Genesis Owusu (7)
- Website: ariaawards.com.au

Television/radio coverage
- Networks
- Nine Network; YouTube; Stan
- Produced by: Craig Campbell

The 2023 ARIA Music Awards were the 37th Annual Australian Recording Industry Association Music Awards (generally known as the ARIA Music Awards or simply the ARIAs) and consist of a series of awards, including the 2023 ARIA Awards, ARIA Artisan Awards, ARIA Fine Arts Awards and ARIA Hall of Fame. The ARIA Awards ceremony occurred on 15 November 2023, broadcast on Nine Network and live-streamed via YouTube and Stan from Hordern Pavilion, Sydney. It was hosted by Today presenter Brooke Boney and comedian Tommy Little. After a two-year gap in inductees Jet entered the Hall of Fame and performed a medley of their hit songs. Troye Sivan won the most trophies obtaining four from six nominations, while Genesis Owusu received the most nominations with seven and won three. Nominees had been announced on 21 September. Two related, new categories were introduced: Best Use of an Australian Recording in an Advertisement (duration of 2 minutes or less) and Best Use of an Australian Recording in an Advertisement (over 2 minutes duration).

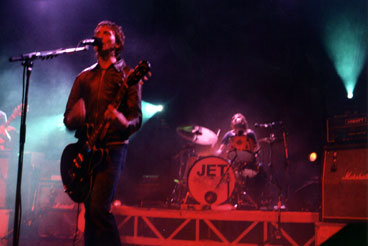
ARIA Hall of Fame inductees Jet, shown in 2004

== Performers ==
Performers were announced by ARIA representatives on 6 November 2023.

Performers and songs for the ARIA Awards ceremony
Artist(s)	Song(s)	Ref.
G Flip	"Good Enough", "The Worst Person Alive"	
Budjerah	"Therapy"	
DMA's	"Everybody's Saying Thursday's the Weekend"	
Peach PRC	"Perfect for You", "Loved You Before"	
Brad Cox	"Now She Ain't"	
Fanny Lumsden	"You'll Be Fine"	
Jessica Mauboy	"Give You Love"	
Meg Mac	"Letter"	
Sound Unlimited Posse, Bliss n Eso, Barkaa, 1200 Techniques, DJ Krissy, Kye	Medley: "One More from the City"	
Jet	"Cold Hard Bitch", "Look What You've Done", "Are You Gonna Be My Girl"	

== Presenters ==
Presenters were announced by ARIA representatives on 6 November 2023.

Presenters and awards for the ARIA Awards ceremony
Artist(s)	Award(s)	Ref.
Troye Sivan, Tommy Little	Best Video	
Marcia Hines	Best Adult Contemporary Album	
Dolly Parton	Best Country Album	
Baker Boy		
Dylan Alcott		
Cub Sport		
Jack River		
Kate Ceberano		
Thelma Plum		
Smallzy	Best Dance/Electronic Release	
Claudia Karvan		
Dermot Kennedy	Music Teacher of the Year	
Joel Corry		
Missy Higgins	Best Solo Artist	
Brooke Boney, Tommy Little	Best Australian Live Act	
Christian Wilkins		
Gretta Ray, Ruel	Best Pop Release	
Pia Miranda		
Poppy Reid		
Hau Latukefu		
Bryce and Concetta		

== ARIA Hall of Fame inductee ==
Australian rock group Jet were inducted into the ARIA Hall of Fame – the first inductee since 2020. At the ceremony they were introduced by Myf Warhurst and lead singer Nic Cester thanked ARIA, their families and fans; he observed that art and music provide "a place of refuge where thoughts, feelings and emotions can be processed and sometimes shared in a way that can bring people together". Jet played a medley of their hit songs "Cold Hard Bitch", "Look What You've Done" and "Are You Gonna Be My Girl".

== Nominees and winners ==
Nominations were announced on 21 September 2023 via ARIA's YouTube channel, hosted by Brooke Boney. The nominees for Telstra ARIA Music Teacher of the Year had been announced on 14 September. Winners were announced on 15 November.

=== ARIA Awards ===
Full list of nominees
Album of the Year	Best Solo Artist
Genesis Owusu – Struggler; DMA's – How Many Dreams?; G Flip – Drummer; Matt Corby – Everything's Fine; The Teskey Brothers – The Winding Way	Troye Sivan – "Rush"; Budjerah – "2step" by Ed Sheeran (featuring Budjerah); Dan Sultan – Dan Sultan; Dom Dolla – "Eat Your Man" (featuring Nelly Furtado); G Flip – Drummer; Genesis Owusu – Struggler; Jen Cloher – I Am the River, the River Is Me; Kylie Minogue – "Padam Padam"; Meg Mac – Matter Of Time; The Kid Laroi – "Love Again"
Best Group	Michael Gudinski Breakthrough Artist
DMA's – How Many Dreams?; Cub Sport – Jesus at the Gay Bar; King Gizzard & the Lizard Wizard – PetroDragonic Apocalypse; or, Dawn of Eternal Night: An Annihilation of Planet Earth...; Parkway Drive – Darker Still; The Teskey Brothers – The Winding Way	Teenage Dads – Midnight Driving; Charley – Timebombs; grentperez – When We Were Younger; Pacific Avenue – Flowers; Royel Otis – Sofa Kings
Best Adult Contemporary Album	Best Blues & Roots Album
Dan Sultan – Dan Sultan; Alex Lahey – The Answer Is Always Yes; Kate Ceberano – My Life Is a Symphony; Mo'Ju – Oro, Plata, Mata; Tina Arena – Love Saves	The Teskey Brothers – The Winding Way; Cash Savage and the Last Drinks – So This Is Love; Katie Wighton – The End; The Bamboos – Live At Hamer Hall With The Melbourne Symphony Orchestra; Ziggy Alberts – Dancing in the Dark
Best Children's Album	Best Country Album
Emma Memma – Emma Memma; Peter Combe – Planet Earth 3rd from the Sun; Play School – Very Jazzy Street Party; The Wiggles – Ready, Steady, Wiggle!; Whistle & Trick – Bananas And Other Delicious Things	Fanny Lumsden – Hey Dawn; Brad Cox – Acres; Brooke McClymont and Adam Eckersley – Up, Down & Sideways; Henry Wagons – South of Everywhere; The Wolfe Brothers – Livin' the Dream
Best Dance/Electronic Release	Best Hard Rock/Heavy Metal Album
MK and Dom Dolla – "Rhyme Dust"; Fisher & Aatig – "Take It Off"; Golden Features – Sisyphus; Lastlings – Perfect World; PNAU and Troye Sivan – "You Know What I Need"	Parkway Drive – Darker Still; DZ Deathrays – R.I.F.F; King Gizzard & the Lizard Wizard – PetroDragonic Apocalypse; or, Dawn of Eternal Night: An Annihilation of Planet Earth...; The Amity Affliction – Not Without My Ghosts; These New South Whales – TNSW
Best Hip Hop/Rap Release	Best Independent Release
Genesis Owusu – Struggler; Kahukx – Nothing to Something; Kerser – A Gift & a Kers; Onefour (featuring CG) – "Comma's"; Tkay Maidza and Flume – "Silent Assassin"	Genesis Owusu – Struggler; Cub Sport – Jesus at the Gay Bar; Dan Sultan – Dan Sultan; G Flip – Drummer; Kylie Minogue – "Padam Padam"
Best Pop Release	Best Rock Album
Kylie Minogue – "Padam Padam"; Amy Shark – "Can I Shower at Yours"; Budjerah – "Therapy"; Peach PRC – "Perfect for You"; Troye Sivan – "Rush"	King Gizzard & the Lizard Wizard – Ice, Death, Planets, Lungs, Mushrooms and Lava; Bad//Dreems – Hoo Ha!; DMA's – How Many Dreams?; G Flip – Drummer; Pacific Avenue – Flowers
Best Soul/R&B Release	Best Use of an Australian Recording in an Advertisement (duration of 2 minutes or less)
Forest Claudette (featuring EarthGang) – "Mess Around"; Chanel Loren – "Rollin"; Jade Weazel – "Skin"; Kye – "Ribena"; Pania – "P Stands 4 Playa"	Baker Boy – Google: Helping You Help Others (72andSunn); Empire of the Sun – Tourism WA: Walking On A Dream (The Brand Agency); King Stingray – Tourism Australia: Come and Say G'day (M&C Saatchi Sydney); Matt Corby – Wild Turkey: Music 101: Trust Your Spirit (BRING Agency)
Best Use of an Australian Recording in an Advertisement (over 2 minutes duration)
John Williamson – Australian Marine Conservation Society: Voice of the Sea (INNOCEAN Australia Pty Ltd); Becca Hatch – Sims Sessions: Blessed (Bolster Group); King Stingray – Tourism Australia: G'day Short Film (M&C Saatchi Sydney); The Veronicas – Vodka Cruiser: The Solo Project (BRING Agency)

=== Public voted ===
Best Video	Song of the Year
Kyle Caulfield for G Flip – "Good Enough"; Claudia Sangiorgi Dalimore for Genesis Owusu – "Stay Blessed"; Joel Burrows for DMA's – "Everybody's Saying Thursday's the Weekend"; Joel Rasmussen and Rowena Rasmussen for Jessica Mauboy – "Give You Love" (featuring Jason Derulo); Kyle Caulfield for Peach PRC – "Manic Dream Pixie"; Mitch Green for Amy Shark – "Can I Shower at Yours"; Murli Dhir for May-a – "Lola"; Murli Dhir and Made In Katana Studios for Budjerah – "Therapy"; Sam Brumby for King Stingray – "Lookin' Out"; Spod for King Gizzard & the Lizard Wizard – "Gila Monster"	Troye Sivan – "Rush"; Budjerah – "Therapy"; Day1 (featuring Kahukx) – "Mbappé"; Dean Lewis – "How Do I Say Goodbye"; Joji – "Die For You"; Kylie Minogue – "Padam Padam"; Luude and Mattafix – "Big City Life"; MK and Dom Dolla – "Rhyme Dust"; R3hab and Amy Shark – "Sway My Way"; The Kid Laroi – "Love Again"
Best Australian Live Act	Best International Artist
G Flip – Drummer Australian Tour; Baker Boy – Regional Vic Tour; Brad Cox – Acres Tour; Budjerah – Budjerah Australian Tour; DMA's – DMA's Live at Falls Festival; Dom Dolla – Dom Dolla Australian Summer Festival Tour; Julia Jacklin – Pre Pleasure Tour; King Stingray – That's Where I Wanna Be Tour; Rüfüs Du Sol – Rüfüs Du Sol Australian 2022 Tour; Tame Impala – Slow Rush Tour	Taylor Swift – Midnights; Beyoncé – Renaissance; Drake and 21 Savage – Her Loss; Ed Sheeran – -; Luke Combs – Gettin' Old; Metro Boomin – Heroes & Villains; Morgan Wallen – One Thing at a Time; Nicki Minaj – Queen Radio; P!NK – Trustfall; SZA – SOS
Music Teacher of the Year
Sue Lowry (Southport Special School, Southport QLD); Hank Lewerissa (Upper Coomera State College, Upper Coomera QLD); Jessie Copeman (Ainslie School, Braddon ACT); Peter Earl (Numerous schools in the Blue Mountains/Western Sydney region, Bullaburra NSW)

=== Fine Arts Awards ===
Best Classical Album
- Australian Chamber Orchestra and Richard Tognetti – Indies & Idols
  - Ensemble Offspring – To Listen, To Sing – Ngarra-Burria: First Peoples Composers
  - Neil Gaiman and FourPlay String Quartet – Signs of Life
  - Roger Benedict and Simon Tedeschi – Dubussy – Ravel
  - Genevieve Lacey and Various Artists – Genevieve Lacey: Breathing Space
Best Jazz Album
- The Vampires featuring Chris Abrahams – Nightjar
  - Lance Gurisik – Cull Portal
  - Mike Nock – Hearing
  - Sinj Clarke – The Height Of Love
  - Surprise Chef – Education & Recreation
Best World Music Album
- Joseph Tawadros – Those Who Came Before Us
  - Byron Mark – Odyssey
  - East of West – Moving Home
  - Mick Dick – Id of RA
  - Songs of Disappearance – Australian Frog Calls
Best Original Soundtrack or Musical Theatre Cast Album
- Various Artists – John Farnham: Finding the Voice (Music from the Feature Documentary)
  - Brett Aplin and Burkhard Dallwitz – Splice Here: A Projected Odyssey (Original Motion Picture Soundtrack)
  - Helena Czajka – Unseen Skies (Original Score Soundtrack)
  - Nigel Westlake, Melbourne Symphony Orchestra and Benjamin Northey – Blueback – Original Motion Picture Soundtrack
  - Sophie Payton (Gordi), Jason Fernandez – Ride (Music from the Film)

=== Artisan Awards ===
Best Produced Release
- Styalz Fuego for Troye Sivan – "Rush"
  - Andrew Klippel and Dave Hammer for Genesis Owusu – Struggler
  - Dom Dolla for Dom Dolla – "Eat Your Man"
  - Matt Corby, Chris Collins, Nat Dunn, Alex Henrikssen for Matt Corby – Everything's Fine
  - M-Phazes for Ruel – 4th Wall
Best Engineered Release
- Styalz Fuego for Troye Sivan – "Rush"
  - Dann Hume, Chris Collins, Matt Corby for Matt Corby – Everything's Fine
  - Dom Dolla for Dom Dolla – "Eat Your Man"
  - Eric J Dobowsky, Sam Teskey, Wayne Connelly for The Teskey Brothers – The Winding Way
  - Simon Cohen, Dave Hammer for Genesis Owusu – Struggler
Best Cover Art
- Jeremy Koren (Grey Ghost) for Forest Claudette – Everything Was Green
  - Connor Dewhurst for Brad Cox – Acres
  - Harry Allen – Studio Balcony for Private Function – 370HSSV 0773H
  - Peach PRC, Billy Zammit for Peach PRC – Manic Dream Pixie
  - Sam Netterfiled, Mia Rankin for Cub Sport – Jesus at the Gay Bar
