= Struggler =

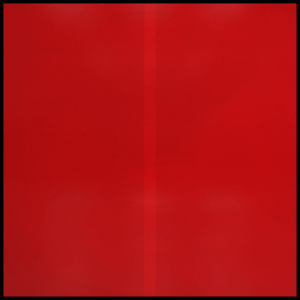

Studio album by Genesis Owusu
- Released: 18 August 2023
- Studio: Chumba Meadows (Tarzana); Pulse (Los Angeles); Big Mercy (Brooklyn); Colonius Tower (Los Angeles); Studios 301 (Alexandria); The Well; Wonderland Ave; The Kiln; Valley Girl (Highland Park); No Big Deal
- Genre: Post-punk; funk rock; hip-hop; R&B
- Length: 37:58
- Label: Ourness; AWAL
- Producer: Jason Evigan; Dave Hammer; Mikey Freedom Hart; Andrew Klippel; Pat Morrissey; Psymun; Jackson Rau; Henry Was; Sol Was; Valley Girl

Genesis Owusu chronology
Smiling with No Teeth (2021)	Struggler (2023)	Redstar Wu & The Worldwide Scourge (2026)

Singles from Struggler
- 1. "Leaving the Light" Released: 19 May 2023; 2. "Tied Up!" Released: 12 July 2023; 3. "Survivor" Released: 1 December 2023

Struggler is the second studio album by Australian musician Genesis Owusu, released on 18 August 2023 through Ourness. The album was supported with a world tour, across North America, Europe and Australia between October and December 2023.

At the 2023 ARIA Music Awards, the album won Album of the Year, Best Independent Release and Best Hip Hop/Rap Release and was nominated for Best Produced Release, Best Engineered Release and Best Solo Artist. At the 2023 J Awards, the album was nominated for Australian Album of the Year. The album was nominated for the 2023 Australian Music Prize.

At the AIR Awards of 2024, the album was nominated for Independent Album of the Year and Best Independent Hip Hop Album or EP, while the album was nominated for Independent Publicity Team of the Year and Independent Marketing Team of the Year.

"Survivor" was released as a single and added to the track listing on 1 December 2023.

== Content ==
In a press statement upon announcement in May 2023, Owusu said, "The struggler runs through an absurd world with no 'where' or 'why' at hand. Just an instinctual inner rhythm, yelling at them to survive the pestilence and lightning bolts coming from above. A roach just keeps roaching."

As with Owusu's previous album, Smiling with No Teeth, Struggler has been described as incorporating elements from a wide variety of genres. Timothy Monger of AllMusic observed a "collision of experimental post-punk, rap, and R&B", while Wesley McLean of Exclaim! described the album as "amalgamating elements of post-punk, R&B, hip-hop, funk, new wave, psychedelic rock and more". Tracks such as "See Ya There" and "Tied Up!" were stylistically compared to the work of Prince.

== Critical reception ==
Professional ratings
Aggregate scores
Source	Rating
Metacritic	82/100
Review scores
Source	Rating
AllMusic	4.5/5 stars
Exclaim!	8/10
The Guardian	3/5 stars
NME	4/5 stars

Struggler received a score of 82 out of 100 on review aggregator Metacritic based on eleven critics' reviews, indicating "universal acclaim". Sophie Williams of NME considered Struggler "the work of an artist giving power to some of his most radical sonic ideas. Songs don't often build to a crescendo, they begin there" as "Owusu's stylistic choices are both unexpected and impressive, visiting all corners of his eclectic taste".

Reviewing the album for AllMusic, Timothy Monger claimed that, "Owusu could have gone any number of ways on his sophomore set, but it's a testament to his artistic conviction that he chose to make something so risky and complex. Even better, he pulled it off." Shaad D'Souza of The Guardian contrasted it to Owusu's "brilliant debut" album Smiling with No Teeth as "an ill-defined retread that plays it too safe" and "comparatively mild, Owusu-Ansah seemingly riffing and stalling in hope of a grand set piece that never arrives".

Consequence ranked Struggler 37th on its list of the 50 Best Albums of 2023.

== Track listing ==
Struggler track listing
No.	Title	Writer(s)	Producer(s)	Length
1.	"Leaving the Light"	Kofi Owusu-Ansah; Jason Evigan; Jeff "Gitty" Gitelman; Ben "Smiley" Silverstein	Evigan^{[p]}; Gitelman^{[c]}; Smile High^{[c]}; Jackson Rau^{[v]}	3:10
2.	"The Roach"	Owusu-Ansah; Mikey Freedom Hart; Simon Christensen	Hart; Psymun	2:38
3.	"The Old Man"	Owusu-Ansah; Hart; Christensen	Hart; Psymun	2:24
4.	"See Ya There"	Owusu-Ansah; Andrew Klippel; Michael Di Francesco; Julian Sudek; Jonti Danilewitz; Hamish Stuart; Jono Ma	Klippel	4:39
5.	"Freak Boy"	Owusu-Ansah; Evigan	Evigan^{[p]}; Rau^{[a]}^{[v]}	2:28
6.	"Tied Up!"	Owusu-Ansah; Sol Was	S. Was; Henry Was	3:09
7.	"That's Life (A Swamp)"	Owusu-Ansah; Sudek; Kirin J. Callinan; Di Francesco	Klippel; Dave Hammer	5:26
8.	"Balthazar"	Owusu-Ansah; Evigan; Jackson Rau	Evigan^{[p]}; Rau^{[p]}	3:00
9.	"Stay Blessed"	Owusu-Ansah; Nate Campany; Kyle Shearer	Valley Girl	2:57
10.	"What Comes Will Come"	Owusu-Ansah; Pat Morrissey	Morrissey	3:51
11.	"Stuck to the Fan"	Owusu-Ansah; Klippel; Di Francesco; Ma; Sudek	Klippel	4:16
Total length:				37:58

Digital edition bonus track
No.	Title	Writer(s)	Producer(s)	Length
12.	"Survivor"	Owusu-Ansah; Evigan	Evigan	2:11
Total length:				40:09

=== Notes ===
- ^{^[p]} signifies a primary and vocal producer.
- ^{^[a]} signifies an additional producer.
- ^{^[c]} signifies a co-producer.
- ^{^[v]} signifies a vocal producer.

== Personnel ==
Credits are adapted from the album's liner notes.

=== Musicians ===
- Genesis Owusu – vocals
- Jason Evigan – bass (tracks 1, 5, 8, 12); guitars, drums (1, 5, 8); keyboards (1, 8), backing vocals (1), drums (8)
- Jeff "Gitty" Gitelman – additional backing vocals (1)
- Ben "Smiley" Silverstein – additional keyboards (1), keyboards (5)
- Mikey Freedom Hart – synthesisers, programming, guitar (2, 3); bass (2); baritone guitar, dubs (3)
- Psymun – bass, synthesisers, programming (2, 3)
- Max Freedberg – drums (2, 3)
- Melody English – background vocals (2)
- Andrew Klippel – keyboards (4, 7, 11), backing vocal arrangements (4)
- Michael Di Francesco – bass (4, 7, 11)
- Julian Sudek – drums (4, 7, 11)
- Jonti Danilewitz – guitar (4)
- Hamish Stuart – drums (4)
- Kye – backing vocals (4)
- Blush – background vocals (5)
- Steinj – background vocals (5)
- Sol Was – bass, guitar, synthesisers (6)
- Henry Was – programming (6)
- Kirin J. Callinan – guitar (7, 11)
- Jackson Rau – guitar (8)
- Valley Girl – performance (9)
- Pat Morrissey – programming (10)
- Jono Ma – synthesisers (11)
- Isibane Se Afrika – choir vocals (12)

=== Technical ===
- Jason Evigan – engineering (1, 5, 8, 12)
- Mikey Freedom Hart – engineering (2, 3)
- David Hart – engineering (2, 3)
- Simon Christensen – engineering (2, 3)
- Simon Cohen – engineering (4, 11)
- Jackson Rau – engineering (5, 8)
- Sol Was – engineering (6)
- George Nicholas – engineering (7)
- Dave Hammer – engineering (7)
- Kyle Shearer – engineering (9)
- Nate Campany – engineering (9)
- Pat Morrissey – engineering (10)
- Kofi Owusu-Ansah – additional vocal engineering (3, 7, 11)
- Jess Dess – additional engineering (4)
- Nicolas Mendoza – engineering assistance (4)
- Manny Marroquin – mixing
- Joe LaPorta – mastering
- Chris Galland – mix engineering
- Ramiro Fernandez-Seoane – mix engineering assistance

=== Visuals ===
- Lisa Reihana – photography, art direction
- Ady Neshoda – artwork, art direction
- Kiran Best – artwork, art direction
- Kofi Owusu-Ansah – art direction

== Charts ==
Chart performance for Struggler
Chart (2023)	Peak position
Australian Albums (ARIA)	4
