= Citizen Kay =

Australian hip hop artist

- Born: Kojo Owusu-Ansah; 1994 (age 31–32); Koforidua, Ghana

Citizen Kay is an Australian Canberra-based hip hop artist.

He is the older brother of fellow hip hop rapper Genesis Owusu.

Citizen Kay's EP Demokracy was nominated for Best Urban Album at the ARIA Music Awards of 2015.

Citizen Kay's debut album, With the People, was nominated the next year.

== Biography ==
Kojo Owusu-Ansah was born in Ghana and moved to Australia (in 2000) when he was six. He is the older brother of Genesis Owusu.

He released this single, "YES!" in 2013 and followed it up the next year with an EP called Demokracy, released in November 2014. The EP was nominated for Best Urban Album at the ARIAs and Best Independent Hip-Hop Album Release at the AIR Awards of 2015.

In October 2015 he released his debut album With the People.

Citizen Kay released Belly of the Beast in August 2017.

== Discography ==
=== Albums ===
Title	Album details
With the People	Released: 16 October 2015; Format: CD, Digital download; Label: Asphalt Records (ASR003)
Belly of the Beast	Released: 25 August 2017; Format: CD, Digital download, streaming; Label: OneTwo (Onetwo006)
so, where are we?	Released: 24 November 2023; Format: Digital download, streaming; Label: Self-Released

=== Extended plays ===
Title	EP details
High Evolution Funk	Released: June 2005; Format: LP, Digital download; Label: Sensei (SNS020)
All About the Drums	Released: May 2007; Format: LP, Digital download; Label: Sensei (SNS027)
Demokracy	Released: November 2014; Format: CD, Digital download; Label: Asphalt Records (ASR001)

=== Singles ===
List of singles, showing year
Title	Year	Album/EP
"Yes!"	2013	Demokracy
"Raise a Glass" (featuring BKBB)	2013	Demokracy
"Alive Again" (with Kilter)	2014	non album single
"Freedoom"	2014	Demokracy
"Wax On Wax Off"	2015	With the People
"MyoMy" (with Kirklandd)	2015	non album single
"Life Gives You Lemons"	2015	With the People
"Hey Did You Know?" (with Oliver Sol)	2017	non album single
"These Kicks" (featuring Georgia B)	2017	Belly of the Beast
"Static" (featuring Mondescreen)	2017	Belly of the Beast
"Ego"	2019	non album single
"Funny Business" (featuring Genesis Owusu)	2020	non album single
"Don't Blink"	2020	non album single
"Dominoes"	2022	non album single
"No Peace"	2022	non album single
"so, it begins"	2023	so, where are we?
"it is what it is"	2023	so, where are we?
"'till I figure it out"	2023	so, where are we?
"Follow, My Love"	2023	so, where are we?

== Awards ==
=== AIR Awards ===
The Australian Independent Record Awards (commonly known informally as AIR Awards) is an annual awards night to recognise, promote and celebrate the success of Australia's Independent Music sector.

Year	Nominee / work	Award	Result
2015	Demokracy	Best Independent Hip Hop/Urban Album	Nominated

=== ARIA Music Awards ===
The ARIA Music Awards is an annual awards ceremony that recognises excellence, innovation, and achievement across all genres of Australian music.

Year	Nominee / work	Award	Result
2015	Demokracy	Best Urban Album	Nominated
2016	With The People	Best Urban Album	Nominated

=== National Live Music Awards ===
The National Live Music Awards (NLMAs) are a broad recognition of Australia's diverse live industry, celebrating the success of the Australian live scene. The awards commenced in 2016.

Year	Nominee / work	Award	Result
2016	themselves	ACT Live Voice of the Year	Won
2017	themselves	Live Hip Hop Act of the Year	Nominated
2020	themselves	ACT Act Voice of the Year	Nominated
