= Harvey Sutherland =

Australian musician

- Born: Melbourne, Victoria, Australia
- Occupation: Record producer
- Years active: 2010–present
- Labels: Clarity
- Website: harveysuther.land

Mike Katz, known professionally as Harvey Sutherland, is an Australian producer, bandleader, and synthesist from Melbourne, Victoria, Australia. His debut studio album Boy was released in April 2022.

== Career ==
=== 2010–2021: Career beginnings ===
In 2011, Mike Katz released Wooshie & Mike Kay EP with Wooshie.

In 2013, Harvey Sutherland saw increased popularity outside of Australia with a series of successful 12" records.

In November 2016, Sutherland released Priestess / Bravado on Clarity Recordings, an imprint established by Sutherland himself.

=== 2022: Boy ===
In April 2022, Sutherland released his debut studio album, Boy. The album was recorded during the pandemic in London, Los Angeles, and Melbourne, and was "shaped by Katz's own personal neuroses concerning himself, past relationships, the frustrations of modern society, and his obsessive, never-ending search for the perfect funk". The album was nominated for two awards at the 2022 ARIA Music Awards.

In February 2023, Sutherland released the stand-alone single entitled "Changes", which include an interpolation of the 2002 Sandy Rivera song of the same name.

=== 2025: Debt ===
In July 2025, Sutherland announced the forthcoming release of his second studio album Debt. The lead single "Body Language" features Julian Hamilton from The Presets.

== Discography ==
=== Studio albums ===
List of studio albums, with selected details and chart positions
| Title | Details | Peak chart positions |
| Title | Details | AUS |
|---|---|---|
| Boy | Released: 29 April 2022; Label: Clarity (CRCLP1); Formats: LP, cassette, digital download, streaming | 79 |
| Debt | Released: 10 October 2025; Label: Clarity; Formats: LP, cassette, digital download, streaming | TBA |

=== Extended plays ===
List of extended plays, with release date and label shown
| Title | Details |
|---|---|
| Wooshie & Mike Kay (as Mike Kay and with Wooshie) | Released: 2011; Label: This Thing Records & Tapes (TT001); Formats: CD (limited to 50), digital download |
| Nexus (as Mike Kay) | Released: May 2013; Label: This Thing Records & Tapes (TT009); Formats: Cassette, digital download |
| Low Altitude (as Mike Kay) | Released: September 2013; Label: This Thing Records & Tapes (BF-1005); Formats: 12" LP, digital download |
| Edges | Released: July 2014; Label: Echovolt (EvR015); Formats: 12" LP, digital download |
| Brothers | Released: November 2014; Label: Voyage (VYG02); Formats: 12" LP, digital download |
| Bermuda | Released: May 2015; Label: MCDE (MCDE 1213); Formats: 12" LP, digital download |
| Priestess / Bravado | Released: 4 November 2016; Label: Clarity (CRC 01); Formats: 12" LP, digital download |
| Expectations | Released: March 2017; Label: Clarity (CRC 02); Formats: 12" LP, digital download |
| Amethyst | Released: November 2018; Label: Clarity (CRC 03); Formats: 12" LP, digital download |

== Awards and nominations ==
=== ARIA Music Awards ===
The ARIA Music Awards is an annual awards ceremony that recognises excellence, innovation, and achievement across all genres of Australian music. They commenced in 1987.

| Year | Nominee / work | Award | Result | Ref. |
|---|---|---|---|---|
| 2022 | Boy | Michael Gudinski Breakthrough Artist | Nominated | |
| 2022 | Boy | Best Dance/Electronic Release | Nominated | |

=== Music Victoria Awards ===
The Music Victoria Awards are an annual awards night celebrating Victorian music. They commenced in 2006.

| Year | Nominee / work | Award | Result | Ref. |
|---|---|---|---|---|
| 2017 | Harvey Sutherland | Best Electronic Act | Nominated | |
| 2022 | Harvey Sutherland | Best Electronic Work | Won | |
| 2022 | Boy | Best Victorian Album | Nominated | |
