= Simon Cohen =

Australian music producer

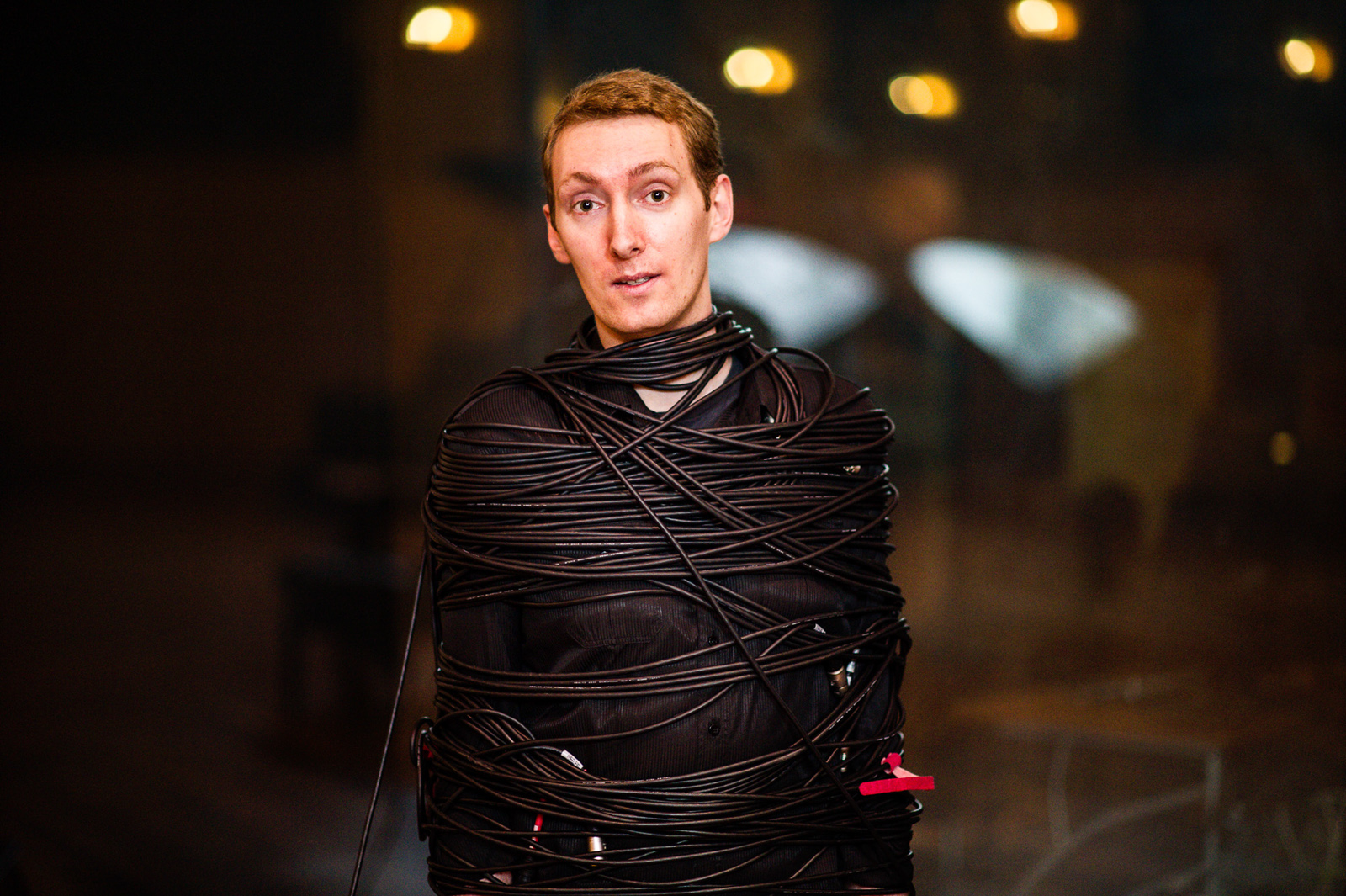
- Cohen in 2015

Background information
- Origin: Sydney, Australia
- Genres: Pop; hip-hop
- Occupations: Vocal producer; mix engineer
- Instrument: Digital audio workstation

Simon Cohen is a Grammy-nominated Australian vocal producer and audio engineer best known for his work on Justin Bieber’s worldwide No. 1 single Love Yourself. He has worked with artists including Troye Sivan, Jessica Mauboy, will.i.am, Guy Sebastian, Justice Crew, Jess Kent, Asta and Indian Summer.

== Background ==
Cohen formed an interest in audio engineering while playing in high school bands, he first broke into the industry through his work on Horrorshow and Spit Syndicate's track All Summer Long. He appeared on Seven Network's The Morning Show with Larry Emdur and Kylie Gillies as well as 2Day FM's Hit 30 program in 2016 to discuss his collaboration with Bieber. In 2020, Cohen and Studios 301 launched their "pay it forward" initiative, allowing musicians to gift a free online audio mix to an artist of their choice.

== Awards and nominations ==
=== ARIA Awards ===
Year	Nominee / work	Award	Result	Ref.
2023	Simon Cohen, Dave Hammer for Genesis Owusu – Struggler	Best Engineered Release	Nominated	

=== Grammy Awards ===
Year	Nominee / work	Award	Result	Ref.
2016	Simon Cohen for Justin Bieber – Purpose	Album of the Year	Nominated	
