= Andrew Klippel =

Australian musician

- Born: Australia
- Occupation: Musician
- Years active: 1990–present

Andrew Klippel is an Australian producer and songwriter who is co-founder of independent management, recording, and publishing label Ourness. Through Ourness, he has managed Genesis Owusu and pop duo Royel Otis.

== Early life ==
Andrew Klippel is the son of sculptor and teacher, Robert Klippel. He spent some years in the UK, before returning to Australia.

By the late 1980s, Klippel began playing live with his own small bands around Sydney, including Andrew Klippel and Electric Soul. In the early 1990s, he formed a songwriting/production company called ESP with Melbourne DJ Ean Sugarman.

== Career ==
In 1991, Klippel co-founded Australian dance-pop trio Euphoria with Holly Garnett and Keren Minshull and in October 1991, they released their debut single "Love You Right" which peaked at number 1 on the ARIA Charts. In April 1992, the trio released "One in a Million" which also peaked at number 1 on the ARIA Charts. The trio released the album, Total Euphoria in October 1992, which peaked at number 14 on the ARIA Charts. The group disbanded in 1993.

In 1994, Klippel released a solo single under the name Elastic. "Caution to the Wind" peaked at number 61 on the ARIA charts.

In 1995, Klippel released solo material under the alias A.K. Soul. Debut single "I Like It" was released in June 1995 and peaked at number 28 on the ARIA Charts. This was followed in 1996 by single "Show You Love" and album, Free.

=== Writing and producing ===
Since 1996, Klippel has become a writer and producer. Klippel worked with Human Nature and then went on to form Engine Room, the home of The Vines, The Veronicas, Lash and Holly Valance.

== Discography ==
=== Studio albums ===
List of albums, with Australian chart positions
Title	Album details	Peak chart positions
Title	Album details	AUS
Free (as A.K. Soul)	Released: July 1996; Format: CD, Cassette; Label: Outlaw Records (D31284)	70
The Orange Album	Released: November 2007; Format: CD, Digital; Label: Warner Music Australia (5144246972)	-

=== Singles ===
List of singles as lead artist, with Australian chart positions
Title	Year	Peak chart positions	Album
Title	Year	AUS	Album
as Elastic
"Caution to the Wind"	1994	61	Free
as A.K. Soul
"I Like It"	1995	28	Free
"Show You Love" (with Jocelyn Brown)	1996	49	Free
"Free" (with Jocelyn Brown)	1996	—	Free

== Awards and nominations ==
=== APRA Awards ===
The APRA Awards are held in Australia and New Zealand by the Australasian Performing Right Association to recognise songwriting skills, sales and airplay performance by its members annually

Year	Nominee / work	Award	Result	Ref.
2022	"The Other Black Dog" by Genesis Owusu (Genesis Owusu, Michael Di Francesco, Andrew Klippel, Julian Sudek)	Song of the Year	Nominated	

=== ARIA Music Awards ===
The ARIA Music Awards is an annual awards ceremony that recognises excellence, innovation, and achievement across all genres of Australian music. They commenced in 1987.

Year	Nominee / work	Award	Result	Ref.
2021	Andrew Klippel and Dave Hammer for Genesis Owusu – Smiling with No Teeth	Producer of the Year	Nominated	
2023	Andrew Klippel and Dave Hammer for Genesis Owusu – Struggler	Best Produced Release	Nominated	
2026	Andrew Klippel and Dave Hammer for Genesis Owusu – Redstar Wu & the Worldwide Scourge	Best Produced Release	Nominated	
