= Genesis Owusu =

Ghanaian-Australian singer (born 1998)

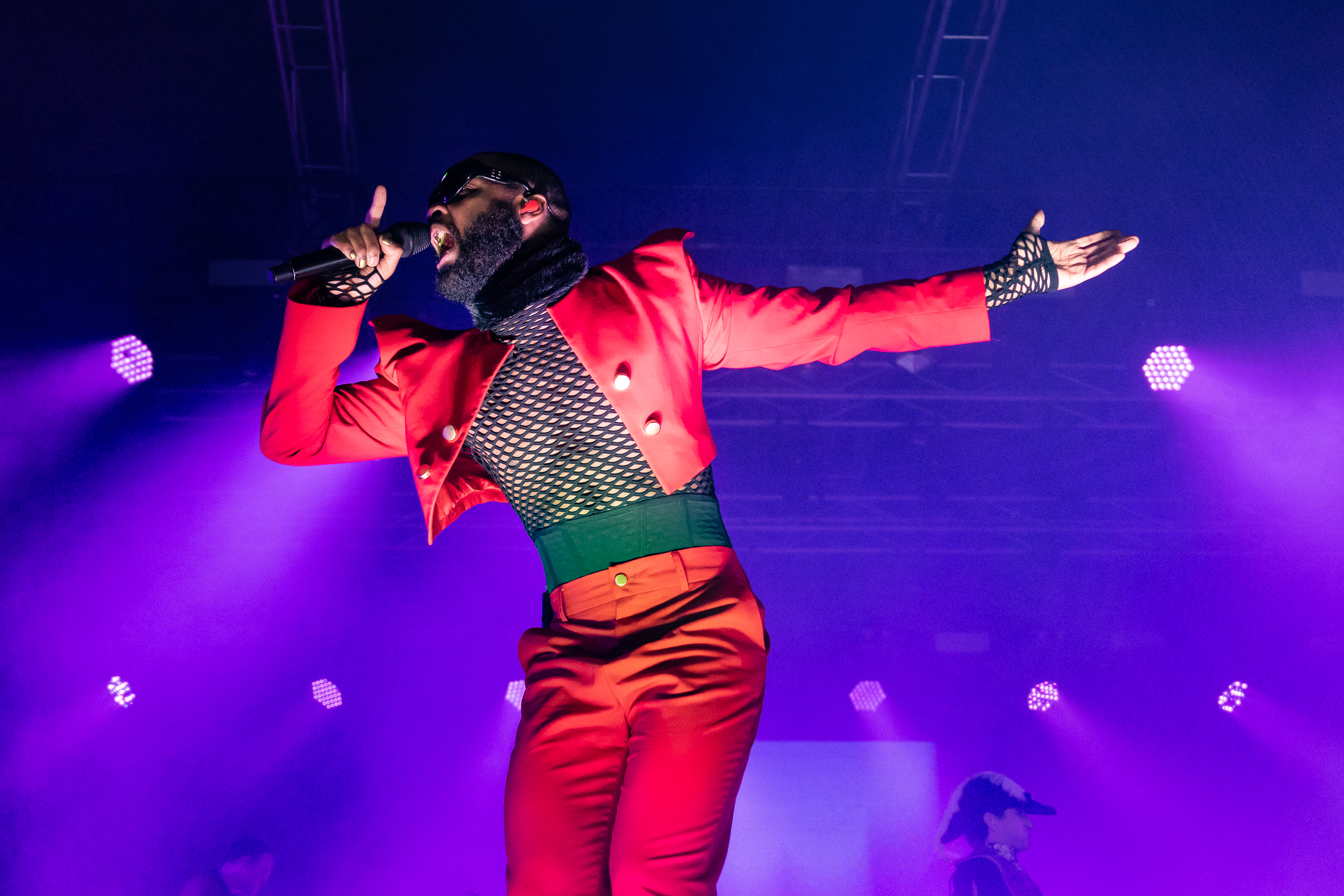
- Owusu performing at Splendour in the Grass in 2022

Background information
- Born: Kofi Owusu-Ansah; 17 April 1998 (age 28); Koforidua, Ghana
- Origin: Canberra, Australian Capital Territory, Australia
- Genres: Hip hop; funk; indie rock; post-punk; punk rock
- Occupations: Rapper; singer-songwriter
- Instrument: Vocals
- Years active: 2015–present
- Website: www.genesisowusu.com

Kofi Owusu-Ansah (born 1998), known professionally as Genesis Owusu, is a Ghanaian-Australian rapper and singer from Canberra. He is the younger brother of fellow hip hop rapper Citizen Kay. Owusu's debut studio album, Smiling with No Teeth (March 2021), reached the ARIA Albums Chart top 30. At the 2021 ARIA Music Awards he won four trophies for Album of the Year, Best Hip Hop Release, Best Independent Release and Best Cover Art (latter shared with Bailey Howard). He released a critically acclaimed follow-up, Struggler, in 2023. Genesis Owusu's third studio album, Redstar Wu & the Worldwide Scourge, was released in 2026.

== Early life and education ==
Genesis Owusu was born Kofi Owusu-Ansah in 1998 in Koforidua, Ghana. His older brother, Kojo (born ca. 1994), is also a rapper who performs as Citizen Kay. The family migrated to Canberra, Australia in 2000.

He was dubbed "Genesis" by Kojo in primary school, who told his friends that his younger brother is Kofi: "his friends were like 'oh, what's your brother's name?' and he said 'Coffee' and they just didn't believe him, for whatever reason. So he just apparently made Genesis up on the spot, and since then it's just stuck." Owusu completed a Bachelor of Journalism at the University of Canberra in 2018.

== Career ==
=== 2015–2019: Career beginnings and Cardrive ===
Musician Citizen Kay is Owusu's older brother, and he decided to feature his younger brother, among other relatives, on "Family Ties", a track on his album With the People (October 2015). Kay explained that "Family Ties"

… is a song about the appreciation of my family and how they've played parts in who I am, both as a person and as a writer/artist. It seemed fitting to get fellow rapping family members on the verses.

The pair then performed and recorded as the Ansah Brothers and in 2015 released an extended play (EP), Polaroid. Fellow Canberra rapper Kirklandd took notice and wanted the younger Owusu on his track "We On", which was first issued as a single in August 2016 and then appeared on Kirklandd's September 2016 four-track EP, The Visions Minitape.

From these experiences, Owusu gained confidence, connections, and fans enough to encourage him to try a solo career. In June 2017, he released his seven-track debut EP, Cardrive. BMA Magazine's Matt Parnell wrote that

the throaty, deep voice, the swagger-infused flow and menacing, jazzy beats give each track a distinctive flavour. Additionally, the polished sound and confidence with which each tune is presented gives the sound an experienced feeling that belies the age of the artist.

The single "Sideways", released in September, includes lyrics in Twi, a dialect of Akan. It received national exposure on youth radio Triple J. Owusu toured Australia's east coast to promote it. Of "Sideways", i-D's Isabelle Hellyer wrote

Where [Owusu's] older work would flit between jazz and hip hop, 'Sideways' synthesises both genres into sound of his own.

The singer rejected the archetypical objectification of women by hip hop artists with his second single, "Awomen Amen" (2018), and explained, "As a rapper, I never used to hear those kinds of messages... it was something that always bothered me." He released a double A-sided single, "WUTD"/"Vultures" early in 2019, which Caitlin Medcalf of Purple Sneakers reviewed, "[WUTD is] a smooth, RnB track I guarantee will never get out of your head and, 'Vultures', a wavy rap journey... [his] vocals match the mood with a drawling vocal melody and a light flow that never once feels sharp, but simply goes with the flow." On 3 July 2019 Owusu performed as an opening act at 5 Seconds of Summer's sold-out benefit concert in Sydney. "WUTD" was featured on an ad for Bose noise-cancelling headphones in October 2019.

=== 2020–2021: Smiling with No Teeth ===
Owusu's debut studio album, Smiling with No Teeth, was released on 5 March 2021. The album peaked at number 27 on the ARIA charts. In July, a deluxe version was released titled Missing Molars (SWNT Deluxe). The album went on to win several awards, including ARIA Award for Album of the Year and Australian Music Prize.

=== 2022–2024: "GTFO" and Struggler ===
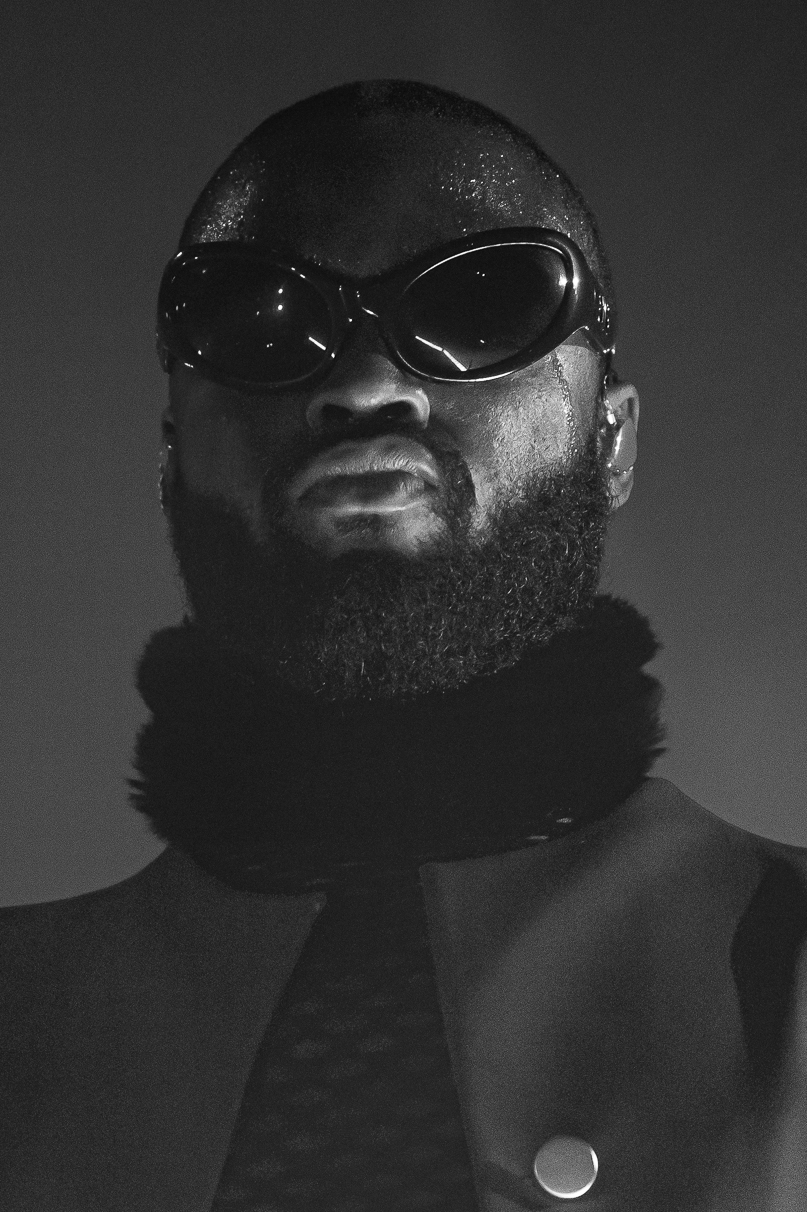
Owusu in 2022

On 20 July 2022, Owusu released "GTFO", alongside its Rhett Wade-Ferrell directed video. It is Owusu's first single of 2022.

On 19 May 2023, Owusu released "Leaving the Light", the lead single from his second studio album, Struggler, which was released on 18 August 2023.

=== 2025–present: Redstar Wu & the Worldwide Scourge ===
In September 2025, Owusu released the anti-capitalist single "Pirate Radio". His third studio album, Redstar Wu & the Worldwide Scourge, was released on 15 May 2026. In September 2026, the single "Stampede" soundtracked Apple Inc.'s campaign for the new iPhone 18 Pro and Pro Max.

== Backing band members ==
As of November 2020, Owusu's backing band members were:

- Kirin J. Callinan – guitar
- Touch Sensitive (Michael Di Francesco) – bass guitar
- Julian Sudek – drums
- Andrew Klippel – keyboard
- Jonti – guitar, keyboard

== Personal life ==
Owusu designs and makes his own clothes and started a fashion line, Pur.

He began dating Linda Hill in 2017, and as of November 2025, he is engaged to her.

== Discography ==
- Smiling with No Teeth (2021)
- Struggler (2023)
- Redstar Wu & the Worldwide Scourge (2026)

== Filmography ==
List of video media appearances, with year released, title, role, and notes shown
Year	Title	Role	Notes	Ref.
2026	Heartbreak High	Himself	Cameo appearance in season 3; performing "Stampede" and "Get Inspired"	

== Awards and nominations ==
=== AIR Awards ===
The Australian Independent Record Awards (commonly known informally as AIR Awards) is an annual awards night to recognise, promote and celebrate the success of Australia's Independent Music sector.

Year	Nominee / work	Award	Result	Ref.
2022	Smiling with No Teeth	Independent Album of the Year	Won	
2022	Smiling with No Teeth	Best Independent Hip Hop Album or EP	Won	
2022	"Smiling with No Teeth"	Independent Song of the Year	Won	
2023	"Get Inspired"	Independent Song of the Year	Won	
2023	Thinking Loud: Genesis Owusu – "Get Inspired"	Independent Publicity Team of the Year	Nominated	
2024	Struggler	Independent Album of the Year	Nominated	
2024	Struggler	Best Independent Hip Hop Album or EP	Won	
2024	"Leaving the Light"	Independent Song of the Year	Nominated	
2024	Thinking Loud – Genesis Owusu - Struggler	Independent Publicity Team of the Year	Nominated	
2024	The Annex/Ourness/AWAL – Genesis Owusu - Struggler	Independent Marketing Team of the Year	Won	

=== APRA Awards ===
The APRA Awards are held in Australia and New Zealand by the Australasian Performing Right Association to recognise songwriting skills, sales and airplay performance by its members annually

Year	Nominee / work	Award	Result	Ref.
2022	"The Other Black Dog"	Song of the Year	Nominated	
2022	Genesis Owusu	Breakthrough Songwriter of the Year	Won	
2023	"GTFO"	Song of the Year	Shortlisted	
2024	"Get Inspired"	Song of the Year	Shortlisted	
2024	"Leaving the Light"	Song of the Year	Shortlisted	
2026	"Pirate Radio"	Song of the Year	Shortlisted	

=== ARIA Music Awards ===
The Australian Recording Industry Association Music Awards (commonly known as the ARIA Music Awards, the ARIA Awards, or simply the ARIAs) recognise excellence, innovation, and achievement across all genres of Australian music. Owusu has won seven awards from twenty seven nominations.

Year	Nominee / work	Award	Result	Ref.
2019	"WUTD" / "Vultures"	Best Soul/R&B Release	Nominated	
2020	"Don't Need You"	Best Soul/R&B Release	Nominated	
2021	Smiling with No Teeth	Album of the Year	Won	
2021	Smiling with No Teeth	Best Artist	Nominated	
2021	Smiling with No Teeth	Best Hip Hop Release	Won	
2021	Smiling with No Teeth	Best Independent Release	Won	
2021	Smiling With No Teeth Album Tour	Best Australian Live Act	Nominated	
2021	Andrew Klippel, Dave Hammer for Genesis Owusu – Smiling with No Teeth	Producer of the Year	Nominated	
2021	Kofi Anash & Bailey Howard for Genesis Owusu – Smiling with No Teeth	Best Cover Art	Won	
2022	"GTFO"	Best Independent Release	Nominated	
2022	Genesis Owusu & The Black Dog Band	Best Australian Live Act	Nominated	
2022	"GTFO" (Genesis Owusu, Uncle Friendly)	Best Video	Nominated	
2023	Struggler	Album of the Year	Won	
2023	Struggler	Best Solo Artist	Nominated	
2023	Struggler	Best Hip Hop/Rap Release	Won	
2023	Struggler	Best Independent Release	Won	
2023	Claudia Sangiorgi Dalimore for Genesis Owusu – "Stay Blessed"	Best Video	Nominated	
2023	Andrew Klippel and Dave Hammer for Genesis Owusu – Struggler	Best Produced Release	Nominated	
2023	Simon Cohen, Dave Hammer for Genesis Owusu – Struggler	Best Engineered Release	Nominated	
2026	Redstar Wu & the Worldwide Scourge	Album of the Year	Nominated	
2026	Redstar Wu & the Worldwide Scourge	Best Solo Artist	Nominated	
2026	Redstar Wu & the Worldwide Scourge	Best Independent Release	Nominated	
2026	Redstar Wu & the Worldwide Scourge	Best Alternative Release	Nominated	
2026	Redstar Wu & the Worldwide Scourge	Best Cover Art	Nominated	
2026	Dann Hume and Andrew Klippel for Genesis Owusu – Redstar Wu & the Worldwide Scourge	Best Produced Release	Nominated	
2026	Isaac Brown for Genesis Owusu – "Stampede"	Best Video	Nominated	
2026	Genesis Owusu – Redstar Wu's Pirate Radio Tour	Best Australian Live Act	Nominated	

=== Australian Music Prize ===
The Australian Music Prize (the AMP) is an annual award of $50,000 given to an Australian band or solo artist in recognition of the merit of an album released during the year of award. It commenced in 2005.

Year	Nominee / work	Award	Result	Ref.
2021	Smiling with No Teeth	Australian Music Prize	Won	
2023	Struggler	Australian Music Prize	Nominated	
2026	Redstar Wu & the Worldwide Scourge	Australian Music Prize	Nominated	

=== J Awards ===
The J Awards are an annual series of Australian music awards that were established by the Australian Broadcasting Corporation's youth-focused radio station Triple J. They commenced in 2005.

Year	Nominee / work	Award	Result	Ref.
2021	Smiling with No Teeth	Australian Album of the Year	Won	
2021	"The Other Black Dog" (directed by Riley Blakeway)	Australian Video of the Year	Won	
2023	Struggler	Australian Album of the Year	Nominated	
2023	Genesis Owusu	Australian Live Act of the Year	Won	
2026	Redstar Wu & the Worldwide Scourge	Australian Album of the Year	Won	
2026	"Stampede" (directed by Isaac Brown)	Australian Video of the Year	Won	
2026	Genesis Owusu	Australian Live Act of the Year	Nominated	

=== National Live Music Awards ===
The National Live Music Awards (NLMAs) commenced in 2016 to recognise contributions to the live music industry in Australia.

Year	Nominee / work	Award	Result	Ref.
2017	Himself	Live Hip Hop Act of the Year	Nominated	
2018	Himself	Live Hip Hop Act of the Year	Nominated	
2019	Himself	Live Hip Hop Act of the Year	Nominated	
2019	Himself	ACT Live Voice of the Year	Won	
2020	Himself	Live Act of the Year	Nominated	
2023	Himself	Best Live Act	Nominated	
2023	Himself	Best Hip Hop Act	Won	
2023	Himself	Best Live Act in the ACT	Won	
2023	Alex McCoy and Pat Babekuhl (for Genesis Owusu)	Best Stage & Light Design	Won	

=== Rolling Stone Australia Awards ===
The Rolling Stone Australia Awards are awarded annually in January or February by the Australian edition of Rolling Stone magazine for outstanding contributions to popular culture in the previous year.

Year	Nominee / work	Award	Result	Ref.
2022	Smiling with No Teeth	Best Record	Won	
2022	Genesis Owusu	Best New Artist	Nominated	

=== Vanda & Young Global Songwriting Competition ===
The Vanda & Young Global Songwriting Competition is an annual competition that "acknowledges great songwriting whilst supporting and raising money for Nordoff-Robbins" and is coordinated by Albert Music and APRA AMCOS. It commenced in 2009.

Year	Nominee / work	Award	Result	Ref.
2021	"Gold Chains"	Vanda & Young Global Songwriting Competition	1st	
