= Amyl and the Sniffers discography =

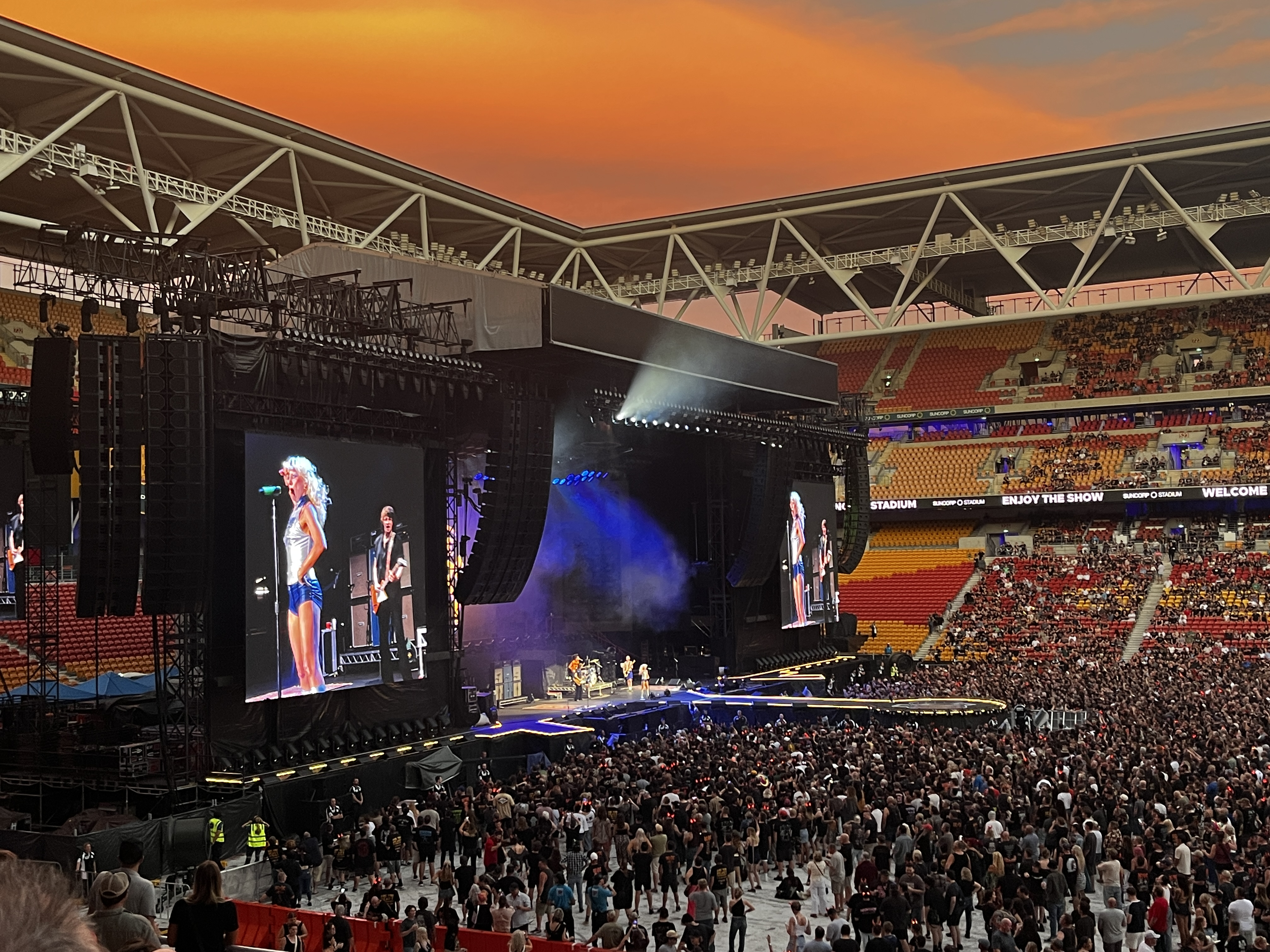
- Amyl and the Sniffers in 2025
- Studio albums: 3
- EPs: 4
- Singles: 14

The discography of Australian pub rock and punk band Amyl and the Sniffers consists of 3 studio albums, 4 extended play and 14 singles.

The band been nominated for many awards, including AIR Awards, APRA Awards, ARIA Music Awards, J Awards, Music Victoria Awards, National Live Music Awards and Rolling Stone Australia Awards winning all of these at least once.

== Albums ==
=== Studio albums ===
Title	Details	Peak chart positions						
Title	Details	AUS	BEL (WA)	GER	IRE	SWI	UK	US
Amyl and the Sniffers	Released: 24 May 2019; Formats: CD, digital download, streaming, LP; Label: Flightless, Rough Trade, ATO	22	—	—	—	—	91	—
Comfort to Me	Released: 10 September 2021; Formats: CD, digital download, streaming, LP; Label: B2B, Rough Trade, ATO	2	83	22	88	98	21	— (Note: Comfort to Me did not enter the Billboard 200, but peaked at number 18 on the Top Album Sales chart.)
Cartoon Darkness	Released: 25 October 2024; Formats: CD, digital download, streaming, LP; Label: B2B, Rough Trade, Virgin Music Group	2	144	9	—	45	9	196

=== Live albums ===
Title	Details	Peak chart positions
Title	Details	AUS
Truth or Consequence	Released: 4 September 2026; Format: CD, LP, digital download; Label: Amyl and the Sniffers, Rogue Trade	23

=== Compilations ===
Title	Details	Peak chart positions		
Title	Details	AUS	FRA Rock	UK Vinyl
Giddy Up/Big Attraction	Released: January 2018; Re-released: 22 May 2026; Format: CD, LP; Label: Homeless (HOMELESS29); Re-release label: Virgin (B2B006)	22	75	24

== EPs ==
Title	Details	Peak chart positions
Title	Details	UK Vinyl
Giddy Up	Released: 24 February 2016; Format: Cassette, digital download; Label: Amyl and the Sniffers	—
Big Attraction	Released: 15 March 2017; Format: Cassette, digital download; Label: Amyl and the Sniffers	—
Live at the Croxton	Released: May 2020; Format: digital, 7" EP; Label: Amyl and the Sniffers, Rough Trade (RT0133S)	2
Live at the Fonda	Released: December 2024; Format: digital, 7" EP; Label: Amyl and the Sniffers, Rough Trade (RT0529TE)	12

== Singles ==
List of singles, showing year released and album name
Title	Year	Peak chart positions		Certifications	Album
Title	Year	NZ Hot	UK	Certifications	Album
"Balaclava Lover Boogie"	2018	—	—		Big Attraction
"Cup of Destiny"	2018	—	—		Amyl and the Sniffers
"Some Mutts (Can't Be Muzzled)"	2018	—	—		Amyl and the Sniffers
"Monsoon Rock"	2019	—	—		Amyl and the Sniffers
"Got You"	2019	—	—		Amyl and the Sniffers
"Gacked on Anger"	2019	—	—		Amyl and the Sniffers
"Guided by Angels"	2021	—	—		Comfort to Me
"Security"	2021	—	—		Comfort to Me
"Hertz"	2021	—	—	ARIA: Gold	Comfort to Me
"U Should Not Be Doing That"/"Facts"	2024	—	— (Note: "U Should Not Be Doing That" peaked at number 1 on the Official Vinyl Singles Chart.)		Cartoon Darkness
"Chewing Gum"	2024	—	—		Cartoon Darkness
"Big Dreams"	2024	—	—		Cartoon Darkness
"Jerkin'"	2024	32	—		Cartoon Darkness
"You're a Star" (with Fred Again)	2025	5	47		Non-album single

== See also ==
- Music of Australia
