= Truth or Consequence =

2026 concert film by Amyl and the Sniffers

- Directed by: John Angus Stewart
- Starring: Amyl and the Sniffers
- Release date: 28 August 2026
- Language: English

Truth or Consequence is the concert film by Australian pub rock and punk band Amyl and the Sniffers, interspersed with some candid behind-the-scenes moments. The concert includes stripped-back country versions of their songs. It was recorded in the El Coyote Cafe, Los Angeles and scheduled for a limited theatrical release in August 2026.

== Live album ==
Truth or Consequence

Live album by Amyl and the Sniffers
- Released: 4 September 2026
- Recorded: April 2025
- Studios: El Coyote Cafe, Los Angeles
- Labels: Amyl and the Sniffers; Rough Trade

Amyl and the Sniffers chronology
Cartoon Darkness (2024)	Truth or Consequence (2026)

Truth or Consequence (Live Album) the accompanying live album is scheduled for release on 4 September 2026.

In a statement upon release, the band said "The hope for this record is that it is listened to as it was made, in a ruckus exclamation between a cherished group of friends."

=== Track listing ===
Truth or Consequence track listing
No.	Title	Writer(s)	Length
1.	"Big Dreams"	Declan Mehrtens; Amy Taylor; Bryce Wilson	3:01
2.	"Hertz"	Mehrtens; Taylor; Wilson	2:56
3.	"Bailing On Me"	Mehrtens; Taylor	2:29
4.	"Jerkin'"	Mehrtens; Taylor; Wilson	2:44
5.	"Fella"		2:41
6.	"Chewing Gum"	Mehrtens; Taylor	3:51
7.	"Facts"		3:17
8.	"Caltex Girl"		3:33
9.	"Snakes"		2:32
10.	"Me and the Girls (Are Drunk at the Pig Farm)"		2:12
11.	"Little Bit Punk, Little Bit Country"		2:41
12.	"Lights on the Hill"	Joy McKean	3:20
13.	"Bag of Cocaine"		2:59

== Charts ==
=== Weekly charts ===
Weekly chart performance
Chart (2026)	Peak position
Australian Albums (ARIA)	23
Croatian International Albums (HDU)	2
Scottish Albums (Official Charts)	38
UK Independent Albums (Official Charts)	12

=== Monthly charts ===
Monthly chart performance
Chart (2026)	Position
Croatian International Vinyl Albums (HDU)	4
