= Pania (disambiguation) =

Pania is a figure in Māori mythology.

Pania or Pānia may also refer to:

- Annita Pania (Greek: Αννίτα Πάνια; born 1970), Greek television presenter
- Pania (given name), feminine given name

- Pania (singer), Australian singer

- Pania Wildlife Sanctuary, wildlife sanctuary in Gujarat, India

== See also ==
- Pania della Croce, mountain in Tuscany, Italy
