= Skegss =

Australian surf rock band

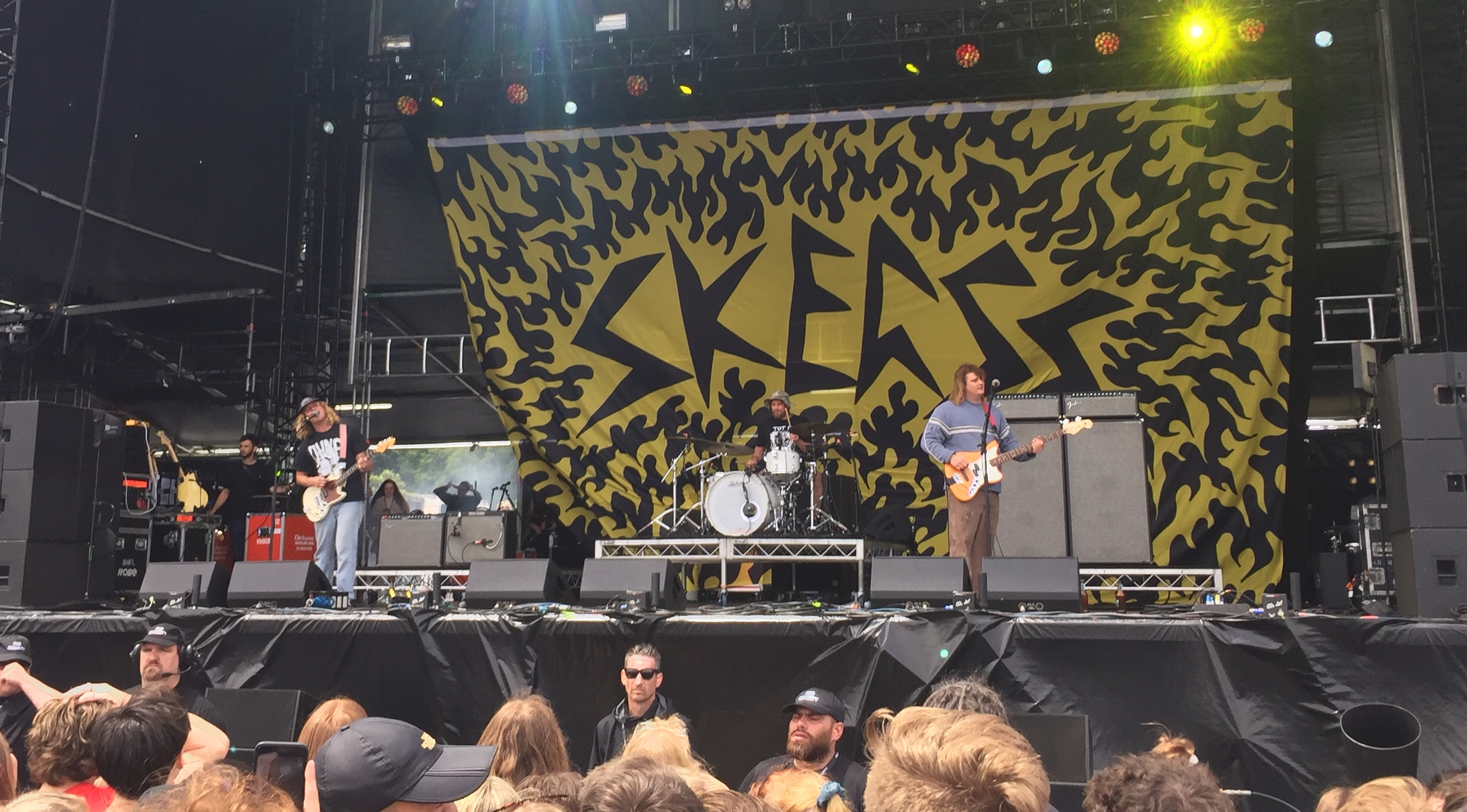
- Skegss live at Good Things Festival in Melbourne, 2019

Background information
- Origin: Byron Bay, New South Wales, Australia
- Genres: Surf rock; indie rock; punk rock
- Years active: 2014–present
- Labels: Ratbag; Warner
- Spinoffs: Mughead, GREG
- Members: Jonny Lani; Ben Reed; Kelton Lee
- Past members: Noa Deane; Toby Cregan
- Website: www.skegss.com

Skegss are an Australian surf and garage rock trio originally from Byron Bay in New South Wales, who formed in 2014. The band's line-up consists of Jonny Lani (drums), Kelton Lee (bass) and Ben Reed (vocals, guitar, bass).

Their debut studio album, My Own Mess, was released in September 2018 and peaked at number 2 on the ARIA Album Charts. In October 2020 the group re-released their EP 50 Push Ups for a Dollar on vinyl, which reached number 4. They followed with a double EP as a vinyl compilation album, Holiday Food/Everyone Is Good at Something, re-released in November 2020, which reached number 17.

== Career ==
=== 2014–2017: Formation and early EPs ===
Skegss were formed in Byron Bay in 2014 as a surf music and garage rock quartet by Toby Cregan (a.k.a. Toby Two String) on bass guitar, Noa Deane on guitar, Jonny Lani (a.k.a. Johnny Layback) on drums and Ben Reed (a.k.a. Ben Ben Bograil) on lead vocals and guitar. Lani and Reed were childhood friends and reconnected in 2014, the pair began "playing shows for a hundred bucks and a couple of beers wherever [they] could."

Their debut single, "L.S.D." was released in July 2014, at which time they were described by Stab Magazine's writer as, "A band without complex. It's just as you hear, a slack rock band, that remind you of walking bare feet, being sunburned with stiff hair thanks to sea salt." Cregan explained the track's title, "The song is called 'L.S.D' but not like acid, more like, Live.Sleep.Die." They followed with a set of performances in Sydney and southern Queensland in August. Chris Singh of AU.Review opined fans could expect, "a sound which is deceptively casual; a well-crafted ode to those with a more laid-back approach to life."

Their second single, "Rock 'n' Roll Radio", was released in October 2014, which Singh's associate Paul McBride observed, "shows you how easy it is to make a simple and laid-back rock and roll track." By April 2015 Deane had left Skegss to concentrate on his surfing career. The group continued as a trio. They commenced a tour of North America at the end of that month taking dates in California, New York City and Toronto.

Upon return to Australia, in June 2015, they were signed with Ratbag Records, run by Brisbane-based surf musicians, Dune Rats, and distributed by Warner Music. Skegss first EP for the Ratbag label, 50 Push Ups for a Dollar, appeared in October 2015, with a track, "Fun", issued as a single in July.

Skegss' next EP, Everyone Is Good at Something, with seven tracks was released in July 2016. It peaked at No. 4 on the ARIA Hitseekers Albums Chart. James Tait of Howl and Echoes felt, "they look to push their career to further heights with the release of their sophomore EP... [they] happen to be fantastically talented at making punk rock: three honest chords on sun-bleached guitars, chugging rhythms and lyrics reflecting both the debauchery and uncertainty of themselves and the young crowds they manage to wow over on an almost nightly basis."

Kill Your Stereo's Peyton Bernhardt rated it at 75 out-of 100 and explained, "[it] plays out as an existential crisis that an indie rock aficionado may have amid a quintessentially Australian social setting... [they] are the Pharrell Williams of Aussie beach-rock, spreading the happiness around like a contagious virus that you'd be goddamn lucky to catch."

The group issued their next single, "Spring Has Sprung", in December 2016, which theMusic.com.au's staff writer opined, "[it] is everything you could want from a raw, DIY punk anthem, with angst-fuelled sing-alongs imminent as we approach festival season." They followed with another five-track EP, Holiday Food, in April 2017. The group combined both recent EPs as Holiday Food/Everyone Is Good at Something and issued it as a compilation double EP in the same month. It reached the ARIA Hitseekers Albums Chart at No. 12.

Its lead single, "Got on My Skateboard", was issued a month earlier, with Andrew Massie of The Rockpit, expressing the view, "Wrapped in driving drums with an instantly memorable hook that'll earworm you for days, [it] bleeds nostalgia of years gone by and the notion that you should take advantage of being young to make sure you don't ever regret things you didn't do, rather than those that you did." They undertook a headlining tour, in June, to promote the album's release. "Got on My Skateboard" was listed at No. 39 on the Triple J Hottest 100, 2017.

=== 2018–2023: My Own Mess, Rehearsal and Cregan's departure ===
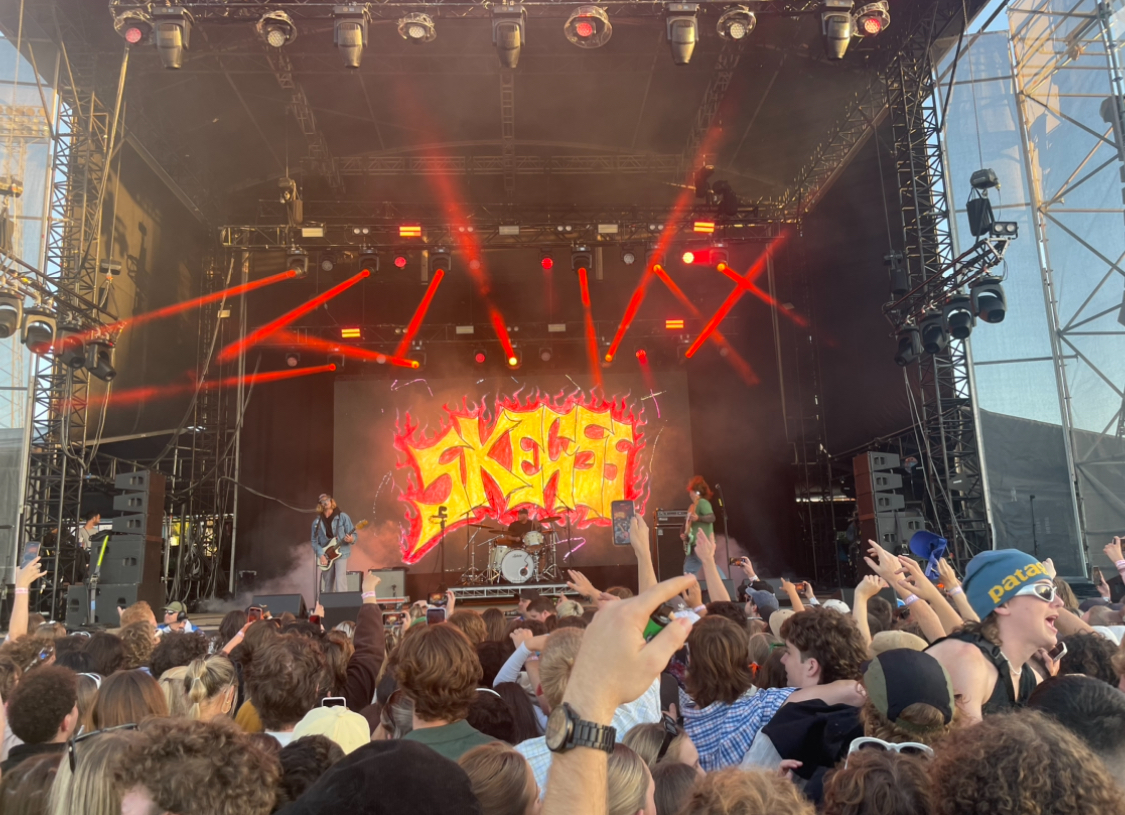
Skegss performing at Groovin' The Moo Bendigo, 2023

In September 2018, the band released their debut studio album My Own Mess, which peaked at number 2 on the ARIA charts. At the ARIA Music Awards of 2019, My Own Mess was nominated for ARIA Award for Best Rock Album, losing out to Amyl and the Sniffers by Amyl and the Sniffers.

In August 2019, it was announced that Skegss has signed with Loma Vista Recordings in the United States.

In late 2020, Skegss re-released early EPs on vinyl for the first time, starting with 50 Push Ups for a Dollar in October and the double EP Holiday Food / Everyone Is Good at Something in November. Both debuted and peaked within the ARIA top 20.

On 16 September 2020, the band released the single "Fantasising". Following its release, Skegss were accused of music plagiarism, with various commentators likening the guitar riffs in the song to "By the Way" by Adelaide punk rock duo Teenage Joans. Skegss later apologised to the duo and called the similarities unintentional.

On 26 March 2021, Skegss released their second studio album Rehearsal, which had been preceded by five singles. The album peaked at number 1 on the ARIA Charts.

In April 2023, the band announced that bassist and vocalist Toby Cregan would be exiting the band following a final show at that year's Splendour in the Grass.

=== 2024: Pacific Highway Music ===
On 16 August 2024, the Skegss released " Out of My Head" and announced their third album Pacific Highway Music will be released on 18 October 2024. It'll be the first as duo of Reed and Lani.

== Band members ==
Current members

- Ben Reed – lead vocals, guitar (2014–present)
- Jonny Lani – drums (2014–present)
- Kelton Lee – bass guitar (2024–present)

Past members

- Noa Deane – guitar (2014–2015)
- Toby Cregan – bass guitar, backing and lead vocals, guitar (2014–2023)

== Public image ==
In an interview with Skegss, David James Young of Mixdown Magazine said the band "come across as standard loose-unit garage rockers with thrashing manes." Life Without Andy said the band has a "youthful energy and [an] infectious sense of humour". Time Out described the band as "DIY, beer-drinking and self-producing maniacs from the surf coast", whilst James Tait of Howl and Echoes has described them as "just three fun-loving dudes from Byron Bay who enjoy a cold beer."

== Discography ==
=== Studio albums ===
List of studio albums, with release date, label, and selected chart positions shown
Title	Details	Peak chart positions
Title	Details	AUS
My Own Mess	Released: 7 September 2018; Label: Ratbag, Warner Music Australasia (RATBAG014CD); Formats: CD, LP, digital download, streaming	2
Rehearsal	Released: 26 March 2021; Label: Loma Vista Recordings (LVR01832); Formats: CD, LP, CS, digital download, streaming	1
Pacific Highway Music	Released: 18 October 2024; Label: Loma Vista Recordings (LVR04518); Formats: CD, LP, digital download, streaming	4

=== Compilation albums ===
List of compilations, with release date, label, and selected chart positions shown
Title	Details	Peak chart positions
Title	Details	AUS
Holiday Food/Everyone Is Good at Something	Release: 7 April 2017 (Note: The EPs Everyone Is Good at Something and Holiday Food were released on vinyl as a compilation on 7 April 2017. This was re-released on vinyl as a 12" album (double EP) in November 2020.); Label: Ratbag/ Warner (RATBAG012LP); Formats: LP	17

=== Extended plays ===
List of EPs, with release date, label, and selected chart positions shown
Title	Details	Peak chart positions	Certifications
Title	Details	AUS	Certifications
Skegss / Glow in the Dark	Released: April 2014; Label: Self-released; Format: Digital download, streaming	—	
3 Songs We Recorded with Adam When We Were in Melbourne	Released: February 2015; Label: Self-released; Format: Digital download, streaming	—	
50 Push Ups for a Dollar	Released: 16 October 2015; Label: Ratbag, Warner Music; Format: digital download, streaming, LP (2020)	4	
Everyone Is Good at Something	Released: 15 July 2016; Label: Ratbag, Warner Music; Formats: CD, digital download	— (Note: Everyone Is Good at Something did not enter the ARIA Top 100 Albums Chart, but peaked at number 4 on the ARIA Hitseekers Albums Chart.)	
Holiday Food	Released: 7 April 2017; Label: Ratbag, Warner Music; Formats: CD, digital download, streaming	—	ARIA: Platinum
Triple J Live at the Wireless	Released: 24 April 2020; Label: ABC Music; Formats: digital download, streaming	—	
Top Heavy	Released: 27 June 2025; Label: Skegss, Loma Vista (LVR05066); Formats: LP, digital download, streaming	—	
Skegss and The Mariachis	Released: 16 October 2026; Label: Skegss, Loma Vista (LVR05886); Formats: CD, digital download, streaming	—	

=== Singles ===
List of singles, with year released and album shown
Title	Year	Certifications	Album
"L.S.D."	2014	ARIA: Platinum	Skegss
"Rock'n'Roll Radio"	2014		Skegss
"Fun"	2015		50 Push Ups for a Dollar
"Eat It"	2015		50 Push Ups for a Dollar
"My Face"	2016		Everyone Is Good at Something
"Mustang"	2016	ARIA: Gold	Everyone Is Good at Something
"Spring Has Sprung"	2016		Holiday Food
"Got on My Skateboard"	2017	ARIA: Platinum	Holiday Food
"Up in the Clouds"	2018	ARIA: 2× Platinum	My Own Mess
"Smogged Out"	2018	ARIA: Gold	My Own Mess
"Stop"	2018		My Own Mess
"Here Comes Your Man" (Triple J Like a Version)	2019		Non-album singles
"Save It for the Weekend"	2019	ARIA: Gold	Non-album singles
"Under the Thunder"	2020	ARIA: Gold	Rehearsal
"Fantasising"	2020		Rehearsal
"Wake Up"	2020		Rehearsal
"Valhalla"	2021		Rehearsal
"Bush TV"	2021		Rehearsal
"Bunny Man"	2021		Non-album singles
"Stranger Days"	2022	ARIA: Gold	Non-album singles
"Spaceman"	2024		Pacific Highway Music
"Out of My Head"	2024		Pacific Highway Music
"High Beaming"	2024		Pacific Highway Music
"So Excited"	2025		Top Heavy
"Hawaii"	2025		Top Heavy
"If It Makes You Happy" (Triple J Like a Version)	2025		Non-album single
"Stranger" (Mariachi)	2026		Skegss and The Mariachis

== Awards ==
=== ARIA Music Awards ===
The ARIA Music Awards is an annual awards ceremony that recognises excellence, innovation, and achievement across all genres of Australian music. Skegss have received one nomination.

Year	Nominee / work	Award	Result	Ref.
2019	My Own Mess	Best Rock Album	Nominated	
2021	Chris Collins for Rehearsal by Skegss	Engineer of the Year	Nominated	

=== Rolling Stone Australia Awards ===
The Rolling Stone Australia Awards are awarded annually in January or February by the Australian edition of Rolling Stone magazine for outstanding contributions to popular culture in the previous year.

Year	Nominee / work	Award	Result	Ref.
2022	Rehearsal	Best Record	Nominated	
