= My Own Mess =

Studio album by Skegss
- Released: 7 September 2018
- Genre: Surf rock, punk rock
- Length: 40:08
- Label: Ratbag
- Producer: Dylan Adams

Skegss chronology
| Holiday Food (2017) | My Own Mess (2018) | Rehearsal (2021) |

Singles from My Own Mess
- 1. "Up in the Clouds" Released: 24 April 2018; 2. "Smogged Out" Released: 11 July 2018; 3. "Stop" Released: 7 September 2018

My Own Mess is the debut studio album by Australian surf music and garage rock band Skegss, released on 7 September 2018. The album debuted and peaked at number 2 on the ARIA Charts.

At the ARIA Music Awards of 2019, the album was nominated for Best Rock Album, losing out to Amyl and the Sniffers by Amyl and the Sniffers.

== Critical reception ==
Professional ratings
Review scores
| Source | Rating |
|---|---|
| The AU Review | 3.5/5 stars |
| Clash | 7/10 stars |
| The Newcastle Herald | 3.5/5 stars |

Laviea Thomas from Clash gave the album a positive review describing the album as "Swirling in surfer-boy aesthetic, heartfelt lyrics and joyous guitar patterns." Thomas said "Need to Do" was the "stand out on the album."

John Lesson from The Newcastle Herald said "Skegss might appear like typical surfer or skate rats, but this three-piece possess an uncanny knack for melody [and] ... while it's typically lo-fi and uncomplicated the hooks are constant." Lesson ended saying "My Own Mess suffers from lack of variety, but Skegss have made one damn catchy debut."

Daniel Hansson from The AU Review said "on the whole My Own Mess floats between the faster chordal patterns of tracks like 'Couch Party' while other tracks, particularly 'Midnight Eyes' and 'Need to Do' are more laid back, giving the album a little bit of breathing room." Hansson concluded saying "My Own Mess is a great album for any long-term Skegss fan or someone just coming into the trio's energy bound sounds, [and] it combines both the spirit of their original releases as well as throwing in new ideas to help liven the album up and keep their music fresh."

== Impact ==
According to Pilerats writer Hayden Davies, "the release of My Own Mess helped pave the future for Australian surf-rock and [placed] Skegss on an untouchable pedestal they've held ever since." Davies also wrote that the album "built upon the surf-rock experimentation defined by acts like Fidlar and Dune Rats and transformed it into concise, anthemic tracks full of Skegss' natural charm and energy."

== Track listing ==
All tracks written by Toby Cregan and Benny Reed.

1. "Up in the Clouds" – 2:29
2. "Infinity" – 2:26
3. "Transaction Fee" – 2:33
4. "Road Trip" – 2:36
5. "Smogged Out" – 2:54
6. "Paradise" – 3:05
7. "Margarita" – 2:53
8. "Couch Party" – 1:46
9. "Stop" – 2:23
10. "Midnight Eyes" – 3:01
11. "Harry Mac" – 2:33
12. "Need to Do" – 3:28
13. "Testing" – 2:12
14. "My Own Mess" – 2:40
15. "My Mind" – 3:07

== Charts ==
Chart performance of My Own Mess
| Chart (2018) | Peak position |
|---|---|
| Australian Albums (ARIA) | 2 |
