= APRA Music Awards of 2026 =

Australian music award ceremony

- Date: 29 April 2026
- Location: Sydney, Australia
- Hosted by: Julia Zemiro

Highlights
- Most wins: Amyl and the Sniffers (3)
- Website: apraamcos.com.au/awards/

The APRA Music Awards of 2026 are the 44th annual series, known as the APRA Awards. The awards are given in a series of categories in three divisions and in separate ceremonies throughout the year: the APRA Music Awards, Art Music Awards and Screen Music Awards. The APRA Music Awards occurred on 29 April 2026. Nominations for the Art Music Awards opened on 5 February to 25 February 2026.

The 25 songs shortlisted for Song of the Year were announced on 3 February 2026 with the final five nominees, alongside all genre category nominees for the APRA Music Awards, will be revealed on 31 March 2026. Amyl and the Sniffers won three awards, including Song of the Year, for a second consecutive time. "Unstoppable" by Sia won Most Performed Australian Work Overseas for the third consecutive year.

== APRA Music Awards ==
=== Ted Albert Award for Outstanding Services to Australian Music ===
- INXS

=== APRA Song of the Year ===
Title and/or artist	Writer(s)	Publisher(s)	Result	Ref.
"Dancing2" by Keli Holiday	Adam Hyde / Alex Cameron / Konstantin Kersting	BMG / Sony Music Publishing / Payday Music Publishing	Nominated	
"iPod Touch" by Ninajirachi	Nina Wilson / Darcy Baylis	Sony Music Publishing	Nominated	
"Jerkin'" by Amyl and the Sniffers	Declan Mehrtens / Amy Taylor / Bryce Wilson		Won	
"Loser" by Tame Impala	Kevin Parker	Sony Music Publishing	Nominated	
"Rita Wrote a Letter" by Paul Kelly	Paul Kelly / Dan Kelly	Sony Music Publishing	Nominated	

=== Songwriter of the Year ===
Writer(s)	Result	Ref.
Amyl and The Sniffers	Won	

=== Emerging Songwriter of the Year ===
Writer(s)	Publisher(s)	Result	Ref.
Barkaa	Sony Music Publishing	Nominated	
Emily Wurramara	Mushroom Music Publishing	Won	
Heide Peverelle, Jeanie Pilkington & Grace Sinclair (Folk Bitch Trio)	Kobalt Music Publishing	Nominated	
Nick Ward	Sony Music Publishing	Nominated	
Nina Wilson (Ninajirachi)	Sony Music Publishing	Nominated	

=== Most Performed Australian Work ===
Title and/or artist	Writer(s)	Publisher(s)	Result	Ref.
"Maybe" by Guy Sebastian	Guy Sebastian / Robby De Sá / Ned Houston	Universal Music Publishing / Sony Music Publishing	Won	
"Please Don't Move to Melbourne" by Ball Park Music	Sam Cromack	Sony Music Publishing	Nominated	
"Stay a Little Longer" by Rosé	Sarah Aarons / Andrew Wells / Chae Park	Sony Music Publishing / Warner Chappell Music	Nominated	
"Tell Me" by Sonny Fodera & Clementine Douglas	Stuart Crichton / Sonny Fodera / Clementine Douglas / Ruth Cunningham	Concord Music Publishing ANZ / BMG / Mushroom Music Publishing	Nominated	
"Touch" by Katseye	Taka Perry / Kota Banks / Caroline Ailin / Omer Fedi / Magnus August Høiberg / Blake Slatkin	Concord Music Publishing ANZ / Sony Music Publishing / Universal/MCA Music Publishing / Warner Chappell Music	Nominated	

=== Most Performed Australian Work Overseas ===
Title	Writer(s)	Result	Ref.
"Unstoppable" by Sia	Sia Furler, Christopher Braide	Won	

=== Most Performed Alternative Work ===
Title and/or artist	Writer(s)	Publisher(s)	Result	Ref.
"All the Noise" by Spacey Jane	Ashton Hardman-Le Cornu / Caleb Harper / Kieran Lama / Peppa Lane	Kobalt Music Publishing o.b.o. Dew Process	Nominated	
"Car" by Royel Otis	Otis Pavlovic / Royel Maddell / Omar Fedi / Blake Slatkin	Kobalt Music Publishing o.b.o. Ourness Songs / Universal/MCA Music Publishing	Nominated	
"Dancing2" by Keli Holiday	Adam Hyde / Alex Cameron / Konstantin Kersting	BMG / Sony Music Publishing / Payday Music Publishing	Nominated	
"Hideaway" by Mallrat	Grace Shaw / Styalz Fuego / Gab Strum	Kobalt Music Publishing o.b.o. Dew Process / Universal Music Publishing / Concord Music Publishing ANZ	Nominated	
"Please Don't Move to Melbourne" by Ball Park Music'	Sam Cromack	Sony Music Publishing	Won	

=== Most Performed Blues & Roots Work ===
Title and/or artist	Writer(s)	Publisher(s)	Result	Ref.
"I'm Yours" by Karen Lee Andrews	Karen Lee Andrews		Nominated	
"Let It Rain" by Dallas Frasca	Dallas Frasca / Paul Wood		Nominated	
"Milk & Honey" by Tash Sultana	Tash Sultana	Kobalt Music Publishing	Nominated	
"Straight Into the Sun" by The Cruel Sea	Tex Perkins / Daniel Atkins / Kristyna Higgins	Universal Music Publishing	Nominated	
"Survial" by Karen Lee Andrews	Daniel March / Adam Ventoura		Won	

=== Most Performed Country Work ===
Title and/or artist	Writer(s)	Publisher(s)	Result	Ref.
"Buy That Girl a Beer" by Casey Barnes	Casey Barnes / Andy Skib / James Thow	Mushroom Music Publishing / Warner Chappell Music	Nominated	
"Dirty Money" by Travis Collins	Travis Collins / Jason Duke / Christopher Yurchuck	Universal Music Publishing / Downtown Music	Nominated	
"I'm a Boxer" by Brad Cox	Brad Cox / Alexander Burnett	Sony Music Publishing / Origin Music Publishing	Nominated	
"Trouble" by Tori Darke & Jay Santilli	Victoria Darke / Jessica Santilli / Michael De Lorenzis / Michael Paynter	Sentric Music Publishing o.b.o. Digital Music Publishing / Mushroom Music Publishing	Nominated	
"Who You Are" by Rachael Fahim	Rachael Fahim / Shawn Mayer / Liam Quinn / Vlado Saric / Keenan Te	Sentric Music Publishing o.b.o. Acts Music Publishing	Won	

=== Most Performed Dance/Electronic Work ===
Title and/or artist	Writer(s)	Publisher(s)	Result	Ref.
"Break My Love" by Rüfüs Du Sol	Jonathon George / James Hunt / Tyrone Lindqvist	Kobalt Music Publishing	Nominated	
"Cave" by Dom Dolla & Tove Lo	Dominic Matheson / Tove Lo	Sony Music Publishing / Warner Chappell Music	Nominated	
"Focus" by John Summit featuring Cloves	Kaity Dunstan / Abraham Dertner / Frederik Geuze / Neil Ormandy / John Schuster	Payday Music Publishing & Silo: Music / Kobalt Music Publishing / Sony Music Publishing / Warner Chappell Music	Nominated	
"Beautiful People" by David Guetta & Sia	Sia Furler / David Guetta / Mikkel Storleer Eriksen / Tor Erik Hermansen / Timofey Reznikov	Sony Music Publishing / Peermusic	Nominated	
"Tell Me" by Sonny Fodera & Clementine Douglas	Stuart Crichton / Sonny Fodera / Clementine Douglas / Ruth Cunningham	Concord Music Publishing ANZ / BMG / Mushroom Music Publishing	Won	

=== Most Performed Hard Rock / Heavy Metal Work ===
Title and/or artist	Writer(s)	Publisher(s)	Result	Ref.
"All That I Remember" by The Amity Affliction	Joel Birch / Daniel Brown / Joseph Longobardi / Jonathan Reeves	Concord Music Publishing ANZ	Nominated	
"Nerv" by Thornhill	Jacob Charlton / Benjamin Maida / Ethan McCann / Nicholas Sjogren / Samuel Bassal	Concord Music Publishing ANZ	Nominated	
"Raindrop" by Ocean Grove	Samuel Bassal / Brent Hunter / Luke Holmes	BMG	Won	
"Sacred" by Parkway Drive	Benjamin Gordon / Luke Kilpatrick / Jeffrey Ling / Winston McCall / Zachary Cervini / Jordan Fish	Kobalt Music Publishing / BMG	Nominated	
"Tether" by Make Them Suffer	Sean Harmanis / Jordan Mather / Nicholas McLernon	Sentric Music Publishing o.b.o. Cooking Vinyl Publishing	Nominated	

=== Most Performed Hip Hop / Rap Work ===
Title and/or artist	Writer(s)	Publisher(s)	Result	Ref.
"The Gift" by Hilltop Hoods featuring Marlon	Matthew Lambert (Suffa) / Daniel Smith (MC Pressure) / Andrew Burford / Jim Ford	Sony Music Publishing / Warner Chappell Music	Nominated	
"Party On the Moon" by Bliss n Eso	Max Mackinnon / Jonathan Notley / Keith Elam / Chris Martin	Mushroom Music Publishing / Mushroom Music Publishing & Sony Music Publishing/ Kobalt Music Publishing & Sony Music Publishing	Nominated	
"Spinnin'" by OneFour & Nemzzz	Jerome Misa / Salec Su'a / Hoi Tang / Nemiah Simms / Robin Turrini	Sony Music Publishing	Won	
"The Trap" by Rops1	Tristan Dunphy / Elijah Wilson	Mushroom Music Publishing	Nominated	
"Who's Back" by Skux	Aayan Ahmed / Logan Cudarans		Nominated	

=== Most Performed Pop Work ===
Title and/or artist	Writer(s)	Publisher(s)	Result	Ref.
"I Can Die Now" by Ruel	Ruel Van Dijk / Julian Bunetta / Joshua Coleman / Edward Drewett / Jacob Kasher Hindlin / Steven Schick	Universal Music Publishing / Sony Music Publishing / Kobalt Music Publishing / Warner Chappell Music	Nominated	
"Maybe" by Guy Sebastian	Guy Sebastian / Robby De Sa / Ned Houston	Universal Music Publishing / Sony Music Publishing	Won	
"Press Pause" by Kita Alexander	Nikkita Wright / Annie Schindel / Kyle Shearer	Kobalt Music Publishing / Concord Music Publishing ANZ	Nominated	
"Stay a Little Longer" by Rosé	Sarah Aarons / Andrew Wells / Chae Park	Sony Music Publishing / Warner Chappell Music	Nominated	
"Touch" by Katseye	Taka Perry / Kota Banks / Caroline Ailin / Omer Fedi / Magnus Hoiberg / Blake Slatkin	Concord Music Publishing ANZ / Sony Music Publishing / Universal/MCA Music Publishing / Warner Chappell Music	Nominated	

=== Most Performed R&B / Soul Work ===
Title and/or artist	Writer(s)	Publisher(s)	Result	Ref.
"Cardio" by Larissa Lambert	Larissa Lambert / Khaled Rohaim / John Jackson / Cynthia Loving / Avital Margulies / Andre Robertson / Justin Smith / Chelsea Unger	Universal/MCA Music Publishing / Sony Music Publishing / Mushroom Music Publishing / Kobalt Music Publishing	Nominated	
"Julia" by Don West	Don West / Nathan Hawes / William Endicott / Zac Olsen / Jacob Parks	Kobalt Music Publishing / Sony Music Publishing	Nominated	
"Lil' Obsession" by Boy Soda	Brae Luafalealo / / Finbar Stuart		Nominated	
"Pity Pary" by Pania	Pania Hika / Jake Amy / Chelsea Warner / Sam Verghese		Won	
"Vetted" by Lithe	Josiah Ramel / Omid Khasrawy	Concord Music Publishing ANZ o.b.o. Boss Level	Nominated	

=== Most Performed Rock Work ===
Title and/or artist	Writer(s)	Publisher(s)	Result	Ref.
"Defiant" by Jimmy Barnes	Jimmy Barnes / Michael Paynter / Ben Rodgers	Sony Music Publishing / Mushroom Music Publishing	Nominated	
"Everyone Will See It" by Old Mervs	Henry Carrington-Jones / Chris Collins / David House	Sony Music Publishing	Nominated	
"Jerkin'" by Amyl and the Sniffers	Declan Mehrtens / Amy Taylor / Bryce Wilson		Won	
"Southerly" by King Stingray	Theo Dimathaya Burarrwanga / Cameron Yimila Burarrwanga / Roy Kellaway / Campbell Messer / Lewis Stiles / Yirrnga Gotjiringu Yunupingu	Sony Music Publishing	Nominated	
"Tangerine" by Ocean Alley	Nic Blom / Baden Donegal / Lach Galbraith / Mitch Galbraith / Angus Goodwin / Tom O'Brien	Warner Chappell Music	Nominated	

=== Most Performed International Work ===
Title and/or artist	Writer(s)	Publisher(s)	Result	Ref.
"Apt." by Bruno Mars and Rosé	Bruno Mars / Amy Allen / Christopher Brown / Rogét Chahayed / Michael Chapman / Nicholas Chinn / Omer Fedi / Philip Lawrence / Chae Park / Theron Thomas / Henry Walter	Warner Chappell Music / Kobalt Music Publishing / Universal Music Publishing/MGB / Universal/MCA Music Publishing / Sony Music Publishing	Nominated	
"Denial Is a River" by Doechii	Doechii / James Anderson / Dante Franklin / Spencer Golanka / Serban Sirbu / Joseph Thompson	Universal/MCA Music Publishing / Sony Music Publishing / Kobalt Music Publishing / Payday Music Publishing / Jungle Habitat Music	Nominated	
"Squabble Up" by Kendrick Lamar	Kendrick Lamar / Ruchaun Maurice Akers Jr. / Jack Antonoff / Matthew Bernard / Tony Butler / Mark Spears	Universal/MCA Music Publishing / Sony Music Publishing	Nominated	
"That's So True" by Gracie Abrams	Gracie Abrams / Audrey Hobert	Universal/MCA Music Publishing	Nominated	
"Timeless" by The Weeknd & Playboi Carti	Abel Tesfaye / Jordan Carter / Raul Cubina / Mike Dean / Evan Hood / Jarrod Morgan / Chisolm Petty / Tariq Sharrieff / Mark Williams / Pharrell Williams	Universal/MCA Music Publishing* / Sony Music Publishing / Kobalt Music Publishing+ / Warner Chappell Music	Won	
