= Got on My Skateboard =

2017 single by Skegss

Single by Skegss

from the album Holiday Food
- Released: 2 March 2017
- Length: 3:47
- Label: Skegss
- Songwriter: Ben Reed
- Producer: Joe Carra

Skegss singles chronology
"Spring Has Sprung" (2016)	"Got on My Skateboard" (2017)	"Up in the Clouds" (2018)

"Got on My Skateboard" is a song by the Australian trio Skegss. It premiered on Triple J's Good Nights on 27 February 2017 and was released on 2 March 2017 as the second and final single from their EP, Holiday Food.

The music video premiered on 4 April 2017 and features comedy performer Aaron Gocs skating around suburbs of Melbourne.

The song polled at number 39 in the Triple J Hottest 100, 2017. In 2025, the song was certified platinum by the Australian Recording Industry Association for sales and streams exceeding 70,000 copies.

== Reception ==
Brandon John from Brag Media said "It's a lovely melancholic tribute to the regrets of not taking the opportunities you're given, and the rewards that come with those you do."

Life Without Andy said "Starting off with some nostalgic strings before the airy vocals float into your earholes, 'Got On My Skateboard' is another breezy jam that'll be the perfect soundtrack to the wind blowing through your hair on an undisturbed Friday arvo."

== Certifications ==
Region	Certification	Certified units/sales
Australia (ARIA)	Platinum	70,000^{‡}
^{‡} Sales+streaming figures based on certification alone.
