= Jerkin' (Amyl and the Sniffers song) =

- Amy Taylor is depicted making a creepy smile and rolling her eyes upward

Single by Amyl and the Sniffers

from the album Cartoon Darkness
- Released: 21 October 2024
- Length: 2:09
- Label: B2B; Virgin Music; Amyl and the Sniffers
- Songwriters: Amy Taylor; Declan Mehrtens; Bryce Wilson
- Producer: Nick Launay

Amyl and the Sniffers singles chronology
"Big Dreams" (2024)	"Jerkin'" (2024)	"You're a Star" (2025)

Music video
- "Jerkin'" (censored) on YouTube

"Jerkin'" is a song by Australian punk band Amyl and the Sniffers, released through B2B and Virgin Music on 21 October 2024 as the fourth and final single from their third studio album, Cartoon Darkness (2024).

"Jerkin'" placed at number 32 on Triple J's Hottest 100 of 2024 and won both Song of the Year and Most Performed Rock Work at the 2026 APRA Music Awards—winning the former award for the second consecutive year, following "U Should Not Be Doing That" in 2025.

== Music video ==
The music video, directed by John Angus Stewart, was released concurrently with the song on 21 October 2024. Upon release, Stewart said, "The level of offence that a vagina or penis can generate is absolutely bizarre. Once, Amy [Taylor] said to me, "If the world wasn't so fucked up, I'd never wear clothes". It's the context we stamp onto our sex organs that makes them innately "offensive". This is why we wanted to strip away the artifice and examine the body in an open, conversational way. We approached the project as if it were a performance in itself."

== Critical reception ==
Kimberley Kapela of the Luna Collective described the song as "a tightly wound grenade of garage punk fury that is unapologetically vulgar. It's both a middle finger to societal norms and a cathartic release of frustration, delivered with all the ferocity and [humour] that fans have come to expect from the band."

== Commercial performance ==
"Jerkin'" placed at number 32 on Triple J's Hottest 100 of 2024.

== Track listing ==
All tracks are written by Amy Taylor and Declan Mehrtens, except where noted.

"Jerkin'" single track listing
No.	Title	Writer(s)	Length
1.	"Jerkin'"	Taylor; Mehrtens; Bryce Wilson	2:08
2.	"Big Dreams"		3:11
3.	"Chewing Gum"		3:20
4.	"U Should Not Be Doing That"	Taylor; Mehrtens; Gus Romer; Wilson	3:26
Total length:			12:05

== Release history ==
"Jerkin'" release history and details
Region	Date	Format(s)	Label	Ref.
Various	21 October 2024	Digital download; streaming	B2B Records / Virgin Music	
