= Cartoon Darkness =

Studio album by Amyl and the Sniffers
- Released: 25 October 2024
- Studios: Studio 606 (Los Angeles); Sunset (Los Angeles)
- Length: 33:48
- Labels: B2B; Virgin
- Producer: Nick Launay

Amyl and the Sniffers chronology
Comfort to Me (2021)	Cartoon Darkness (2024)	Truth or Consequence (2026)

Singles from Cartoon Darkness
- 1. "U Should Not Be Doing That" Released: 21 May 2024; 2. "Chewing Gum" Released: 23 August 2024; 3. "Big Dreams" Released: 25 September 2024; 4. "Jerkin'" Released: 21 October 2024

Cartoon Darkness is the third studio album by Australian pub rock and punk band Amyl and the Sniffers. It was released on 25 October 2024 through B2B Records and Virgin Music Group. It is the band's first studio album since 2021's Comfort to Me.

The album was preceded by the singles and music videos for "U Should Not Be Doing That", "Chewing Gum", "Big Dreams" and "Jerkin'". The music video for "Jerkin'" was released through the band's website because of its graphic full frontal nudity throughout the video. A disclaimer was issued for it to be viewed by adults 18 years and older. A censored version was also released on YouTube.

At the 2024 J Awards, the album was nominated for Australian Album of the Year. The album was nominated for the 2024 Australian Music Prize. The album won Best LP/EP at the 2025 Rolling Stone Australia Awards.

At the AIR Awards of 2025, the album won Independent Album of the Year and Best Independent Rock Album or EP.

At the 2025 ARIA Music Awards, the album won Album of the Year, Best Group, Best Rock Album, and Best Cover Art.

== Critical reception ==
Professional ratings
Aggregate scores
Source	Rating
Metacritic	81/100
Review scores
Source	Rating
AllMusic	4/5 stars
Clash	9/10
The Line of Best Fit	9/10
Pitchfork	6.8/10

According to the review aggregator Metacritic, Cartoon Darkness received "universal acclaim" based on a weighted average score of 81 out of 100 from 15 critic scores.

=== Year-end lists ===
Select year-end rankings for Cartoon Darkness
Publication/critic	Accolade	Rank	Ref.
BBC Radio 6 Music	26 Albums of the Year 2024	–	
Mojo	The Best Albums of 2024	34	
Rough Trade UK	Albums of the Year 2024	7	

== Track listing ==
All lyrics are written by Amy Taylor; all music is composed by Taylor and Declan Mehrtens, except 1 and 13 (Taylor, Mehrtens, Bryce Wilson), 3 (Taylor, Wilson), 6 (Taylor, Fergus Romer), and 10 (Taylor, Mehrtens, Romer, Wilson).

Cartoon Darkness track listing
No.	Title	Length
1.	"Jerkin'"	2:08
2.	"Chewing Gum"	3:20
3.	"Tiny Bikini"	2:14
4.	"Big Dreams"	3:11
5.	"It's Mine"	1:37
6.	"Motorbike Song"	2:24
7.	"Doing in Me Head"	3:01
8.	"Pigs"	2:23
9.	"Bailing on Me"	2:41
10.	"U Should Not Be Doing That"	3:26
11.	"Do It Do It"	2:26
12.	"Going Somewhere"	2:49
13.	"Me and the Girls"	2:08
Total length:		33:48

== Personnel ==
Amyl and the Sniffers

- Amy Taylor – vocals
- Declan Mehrtens – guitar, keyboards, backing vocals
- Gus Romer – bass, backing vocals
- Bryce Wilson – drums, backing vocals

Additional contributors

- Nick Launay – production, recording, mixing
- Bernie Grundman – mastering
- Oliver Roman – additional engineering
- Charlie LoPresti – studio assistance
- Jerred Polacci – studio assistance
- Atom Greenspan – additional sound warping
- Harry Cooper – saxophone on "U Should Not Be Doing That"
- Barnaby Clay – harp on "Me and the Girls"
- John Stewart – photography
- Olivia Jaffe – photography assistance
- Thomas Ronnie – artwork

== Charts ==
=== Weekly charts ===
Weekly chart performance for Cartoon Darkness
Chart (2024)	Peak position
Australian Albums (ARIA)	2
Austrian Albums (Ö3 Austria)	37
Belgian Albums (Ultratop Flanders)	63
Belgian Albums (Ultratop Wallonia)	144
French Albums (SNEP)	55
French Rock & Metal Albums (SNEP)	4
German Albums (Offizielle Top 100)	9
New Zealand Albums (RMNZ)	17
Scottish Albums (Official Charts)	8
Swedish Physical Albums (Sverigetopplistan)	12
Swiss Albums (Schweizer Hitparade)	45
UK Albums (Official Charts)	9
UK Independent Albums (Official Charts)	2
UK Rock & Metal Albums (Official Charts)	1
US Billboard 200	196

=== Year-end charts ===
Year-end chart performance for Cartoon Darkness
Chart (2024)	Position
Australian Artist Albums (ARIA)	10
Chart (2025)	Position
Australian Artist Albums (ARIA)	21
