= Pacific Highway Music =

Studio album by Skegss
- Released: 18 October 2024
- Length: 37:56
- Label: Loma Vista
- Producer: Paul Butler

Skegss chronology
Rehearsal (2021)	Pacific Highway Music (2024)

Singles from Pacific Highway Music
- 1. "Spaceman" Released: 24 May 2024; 2. "Out of My Head" Released: 16 August 2024; 3. "High Beaming" Released: 4 October 2024

Pacific Highway Music is the third studio album by Australian surf music and garage rock band Skegss. The album was announced in August 2024, alongside its second single, "Out of My Head". It was released on 18 October 2024 and debuted at number four on the ARIA Albums Chart, becoming the group's fourth top 5 album.

Its title refers to the highway on the Central Eastern coast of Australia.

== Critical reception ==
Professional ratings
Review scores
Source	Rating
Clunk Magazine	4/5 stars
New Noise Magazine	2.5/5 stars

Seth White from Clunk Magazine said "Their new release holds dear their raw, burnt-out surf indie style whilst becoming perhaps the most spacious and euphoric adaptation of the Skegss sound the band has ever ventured to achieve." White named "Kelly Heroes" as his personal favourite, saying "With the acoustic elements mixed with the blown-out drums making for the perfect sonic comedown".

Joseph Master from New Noise Magazine gave the album 2½ out of 5, saying "Overall, Pacific Highway Music is a mixed bag. Some songs are remarkable, especially the opening two, while others are very average and highly unmemorable."

== Track listing ==
All tracks are written by Ben Reed.

1. "Tradewinds" – 3:57
2. "High Beaming" – 3:34
3. "I Think I Can Fly" – 2:41
4. "Brain on the Highway" – 3:10
5. "Stuck in Cheyenne" – 2:45
6. "Spaceman" – 3:52
7. "Batten Down the Hatches" – 4:11
8. "Aeroplane Heart" – 2:58
9. "Out of My Head" –3:10
10. "It Is" – 3:09
11. "Kelly Heroes" – 4:25

== Personnel ==
Skeggs

- Jon Lani – drums, percussion (all tracks); background vocals (tracks 1–4, 8)
- Ben Reed – vocals, bass guitar, guitar (all tracks); background vocals (tracks 1–4, 7–11), piano (5)

Additional contributors

- Paul Butler – production, engineering (all tracks); background vocals (tracks 1–4, 7–9), keyboards (1, 3, 5, 7–11), percussion (3), guitar (4, 5); drum machine, Hammond B3 (4)
- Stephen Marcussen – mastering
- Dave Sardy – mixing
- Ollie Brown – engineering (all tracks), background vocals (tracks 1, 2, 4)
- Mizra Sheriff – engineering (tracks 2–6, 9–11)

== Charts ==
=== Weekly charts ===
Weekly chart performance for Pacific Highway Music
Chart (2021)	Peak position
Australian Albums (ARIA)	4

=== Year-end charts ===
2024 year-end chart performance for Pacific Highway Music
Chart (2024)	Position
Australian Artist Albums (ARIA)	49
