= Larissa Lambert =

Australian singer

- Born: Ballarat, Victoria, Australia
- Genres: R&B
- Occupation: Singer-songwriter
- Years active: 2021–present

Larissa Lambert is an Australian R&B singer-songwriter from Ballarat, Victoria.

She first gained recognition when her cover of SWV's "Weak" went viral on TikTok in 2021. Lambert has since released a number of singles and projects, including "Cardio", which was nominated for Best Soul/R&B Release at the ARIA Music Awards in 2025.

== Early life ==
Larissa Lambert, born and raised in Ballarat, Victoria. She began playing music from a young age.

== Career ==
In 2021, Larissa gained wider attention after her cover of SWV's 1992 single "Weak" went viral, garnering more than 88 million plays on streaming platforms and social media.

In 2025, Lambert released "Cardio", which received a nomination for Best Soul/R&B Release at the 2026 ARIA Music Awards. At the 2025 TikTok Awards Australia, she won Artist of the Year.

Lambert released her debut studio album Yearning in September 2026.

== Discography ==
=== Albums ===
List of albums, with selected details
Title	Details
Yearning	Released: 18 September 2026; Label: New Levels

=== Extended plays ===
List of extended pays, with selected details
Title	Details
I Love You and It's Getting Worse	Released: 12 May 2023; Label: New Levels
Chronosick	Released: 19 September 2025; Label: New Levels

== Awards and nominations ==
=== APRA Music Awards ===
The APRA Music Awards were established by Australasian Performing Right Association (APRA) in 1982 to honour the achievements of songwriters and music composers, and to recognise their song writing skills, sales and airplay performance, by its members annually.

Year	Nominee / work	Award	Result	Ref.
2026	"Cardio" by Larissa Lambert (Lambert/ Rohaim/ John Jackson /Loving/ Avital Margulies/ Andre Robertson/ Justin Smith/ Chelsea Unger)	Most Performed Blues & Roots Work	Nominated	

=== ARIA Music Awards ===
The ARIA Music Awards is an annual awards ceremony that recognises excellence, innovation, and achievement across all genres of Australian music. They commenced in 1987.

Year	Nominee / work	Award	Result	Ref.
2025	"Cardio"	Best Soul/R&B Release	Nominated	
2026	"I Love You Out Loud"	Best Soul/R&B Release	Nominated	
