= Up in the Clouds (Skegss song) =

2018 single by Skegss

Single by Skegss

from the album My Own Mess
- Released: 24 April 2018
- Length: 2:29
- Label: Skegss
- Songwriter: Ben Reed
- Producers: Dylan Adams; Chris Collins

Skegss singles chronology
"Got on My Skateboard" (2017)	"Up in the Clouds" (2018)	"Smogged Out" (2018)

"Up in the Clouds" is a song by the Australian trio Skegss. It was released on 24 April 2018 as the lead single from their debut studio album, My Own Mess.

Group member Benny Reed told Triple J the track is "about being unsure but realising it's OK to have uncertainty... As soon as we figured that out we made a song about it."

The song polled at number 11 in the Triple J Hottest 100, 2018.

In 2025, the song was certified 2× platinum by the Australian Recording Industry Association for sales and streams exceeding 140,000 copies.

== Reception ==
Harry Webster from Life Without Andy said "The three-piece deliver the perfect balance of emotive lyrics and head banging choruses".

== Certifications ==
Region	Certification	Certified units/sales
Australia (ARIA)	2× Platinum	140,000^{‡}
^{‡} Sales+streaming figures based on certification alone.
