= Stranger Days =

2022 single by Skegss

Single by Skegss
- B-side: "December"
- Released: 1 February 2022
- Length: 4:11
- Label: Loma Vista; Concord
- Songwriter: Ben Reed
- Producer: Chris Collins

Skegss singles chronology
"Bunny Man" (2021)	"Stranger Days" (2022)	"Spaceman" (2024)

"Stranger Days" is a song by the Australian trio Skegss. It was released on 1 February 2022. The Jamieson Kerr-directed music video was released on the same day. It shows drummer Lani training to run a marathon.

The song polled at number 19 in the Triple J's Hottest 100 of 2022.

In February 2026, the song was certified gold by the Australian Recording Industry Association for stream-equivalent units and sales exceeding 35,000 copies.

== Reception ==
Manning Patston from Happy Mag said "Ben opts for an acoustic and strums a folk-influenced chord progression to set the scene. Looking back on a 'lifetime of thunder and lightning', the singer admits his shortcomings, but ultimately, remains joyous and steadfast. The song really springs to life when rhythm boys (Johnny and Tobi) join the fold, giving the swinging folk number a lean edge. Later, group vocals carry through, emphasising the sense of togetherness that embodies the track."

== Track listing ==
1. "Stranger Days" – 4:11
2. "December" – 3:29

== Certifications ==
Region	Certification	Certified units/sales
Australia (ARIA)	Gold	35,000^{‡}
^{‡} Sales+streaming figures based on certification alone.
