= Big Attraction =

- 2017 original art work

EP by Amyl and the Sniffers
- Released: March 2017
- Length: 12:30
- Labels: Amyl and the Sniffers
- Producers: Amyl and the Sniffers and Calum Newton

Amyl and the Sniffers chronology
Giddy Up (2016)	Big Attraction (2017)	Amyl and the Sniffers (2019)

Big Attraction is the second extended play by Australian pub rock and punk band Amyl and the Sniffers. It was self-released in March 2017. It has been re-release numerous times and entered the ARIA Chart at number 22 following its 10th Anniversary release with Giddy Up in May 2026.

The EP drew attention in the US and found a release on indie label Burger Records in September 2017.

Following it release, the group were nominated for Best Emerging Artist at the Music Victoria Awards of 2017.

== Critical reception ==
Louder Sound described the EP as “Punky, mid-70s glam revival goodness” adding “Every track is an easy-sleazy head bopper, but opener 'I'm Not a Loser' is the clear winner here."

== Track listing ==
All lyrics are written by Declan Mehrtens, Gus Romer, Amy Taylor and Bryce Wilson.

No.	Title	Length
1.	"I'm Not a Loser"	1:49
2.	"Blowjobs"	1:30
3.	"Mole (Sniff Sniff)"	0:47
4.	"Balaclava Lover Boogie"	3:40
5.	"Westgate"	2:14
6.	"70s Street Munchies"	2:27
Total length:		12:30

== Charts ==
Chart performance of Big Attraction
Chart (2018)	Peak position
UK Independent Albums Chart (OCC)	33
Chart (2026)	Peak position
Australian Albums (ARIA) (10 Year anniversary, with Giddy Up)	22
Scottish Albums (OCC) (10 Year anniversary, with Giddy Up)	25
UK Independent Albums Chart (OCC) (10 Year anniversary, with Giddy Up)	15
UK Sales Albums Chart (OCC) (10 Year anniversary, with Giddy Up)	33

== Release history ==
Release history for Big Attraction
Region	Date	Format	Label	Catalogue
Australia	March 2017	digital download; streaming; CS (limited)	Amyl and the Sniffers	
Various	2017	digital download; streaming	Amyl and the Sniffers / Virgin	
United States	September 2017	CS (limited)	Burger Records	BRGR 1044
Australia + United Kingdom	February 2018 (Big Attraction & Giddy Up)	CD; LP	Homeless	HOMELESS29
United Kingdom	May 2018 (Big Attraction & Giddy Up)	CD; LP	Damaged Goods	DAMGOOD494LP
Australia + United Kingdom	22 May 2026 (10th Anniversary Big Attraction & Giddy Up)	CD; LP	Virgin / UMA	B2B006
