= Rops1 =

Australian rapper

- Born: Tristan Dunphy; Macquarie Fields, New South Wales, Australia
- Origin: New South Wales, Australia
- Genre: Hip hop
- Occupations: Rapper; songwriter; musician
- Instruments: Vocals; production
- Years active: 2018–present
- Label: New Levels (2025-present)
- Website: rops1.com

Tristan Dunphy, known professionally as Rops1, is an Australian hip-hop and EDM musician from Macquarie Fields, New South Wales.

== Career ==
Rops1's debut single "Still Out Here" was released in October 2018. It's video followed in December 2018.

Youngest in Charge was released in October 2019.

In 2023, Rops1 was co-signed by Kerser who also invited him to join his national tour as an official support act.

In 2025, Rops1 signed with Sydney label New Level. In 2026, Rop1 conducted his first national headline tour.

== Discography ==
=== Albums and EPs ===
List of Albums and EPs, with selected details
Title	Details
Youngest in Charge	Released: October 2019; Label: Format: digital download
Music Saved Me	Released: April 2023; Label: Pushin Keys; Format: digital download
Love for My Brothers / Trench Kid	Released: October 2025 (Note: Love for My Brothers was released in October 2025. It was re-released in December 2025 with 2 new tracks and retitled Trench Kid where it was also released on CD); Label: New Levels; Format: CD, digital download

=== Certified singles ===
List of singles, with year released, selected chart positions, and album name shown
Title	Year	Certifications	Album
"D.O.N"	2019	ARIA: Gold	Youngest in Charge

== Awards and nominations ==
=== APRA Awards ===
The APRA Awards are presented annually from 1982 by the Australasian Performing Right Association (APRA), "honouring composers and songwriters".

Year	Nominee / work	Award	Result	Ref.
2026	"The Trap" (Tristan Dunphy / Elijah Wilson)	Most Performed Hip Hop / Rap Work	Nominated	
