= Soulstar (Boy Soda album) =

Studio album by Boy Soda
- Released: 3 October 2025
- Recorded: Blue Mountains (New South Wales)
- Length: 44:03
- Label: Warner Music Australia

Boy Soda chronology
The Distance Between Thinking and Feeling (2022)	Soulstar (2025)

Singles from Soulstar
- 1. "Lil' Obsession" Released: 31 January 2025; 2. "Blink Twice" Released: 6 June 2025; 3. "4K" Released: 23 July 2025; 4. "Never the Same" Released: 12 September 2025

Singles from Soulstar (Deluxe)
- 1. "Chase Your Tail" Released: 24 April 2026; 2. "Elements" Released: 5 June 2026

Soulstar is the debut studio album by Australian singer-songwriter Boy Soda. The album was announced in July 2025 and released on 3 October 2025.

The album includes live instrumentation, pulling influences from R&B, soul, jazz and funk. Boy Soda said "There was this communal feeling that we were all doing something really incredible and special. It felt over-indulgent being able to have that many live instruments. I'm very aware of the rarity and the privilege to be able to make that album. But hey, who better than to call on your talented mates to make something special happen."

The album debuted at number 32 on the ARIA Charts.

In April 2026, Boy Soda confirmed a deluxe version would be release on 19 June 2026.

At the 2026 ARIA Music Awards it won Best Soul/R&B Release and was also nominated for Album of the Year and Best Solo Artist. The album was nominated for the 2026 NSW Music Prize.

== Reception ==
Dylan Oxley from The Music said "It's evident that Boy Soda put his heart and soul into the record, from the poignant lyrics to the moving performances" calling it "both confident and vulnerable with a reflective lens that illuminates the deeper parts of himself for the world to see."

Phil from Shatter the Standards gave it a 4/5 rating and called it "an ambitious and emotionally rich debut" naming "A Father's Heart", "4K" and "Selfish" as their favourites.

Keithan Samuels from Rated R&B said "Soulstar is a cosmic journey into the world of Boy Soda, where he balances the profound with the playful. He opens up about weighty topics like the struggle of self-compassion, grief over losing a loved one, post-traumatic growth and intergenerational healing, while exploring joyous moments of flirtation, late-night passion and a meaningful friendship."

== Track listing ==
No.	Title	Length
1.	"My Body"	3:50
2.	"Lil' Obsession"	3:01
3.	"Hit the Road"	3:33
4.	"Never the Same"	3:06
5.	"A Father's Heart"	3:08
6.	"4K" (featuring Dean Brady)	2:54
7.	"Blink Twice"	3:22
8.	"Good Morning"	4:10
9.	"PM"	3:11
10.	"Slippery"	2:52
11.	"Find a Way"	3:37
12.	"Selfish"	3:10
13.	"Platonic & Sacred"	4:02

Soulstar (Deluxe)
No.	Title	Length
14.	"Front Door"	3:05
15.	"Chase Your Tail"	3:13
16.	"Bad News"	3:23
17.	"Burnin' All My Days"	3:32
18.	"Elements"	3:27

== Charts ==
Chart performance for Soulstar
Chart (2025)	Peak position
Australian Albums (ARIA)	32

== Release history ==
Country	Date	Format	Label	Catalogue
Australia	3 October 2025	LP; digital download	Warner Music Australia	2173286286
Australia	19 June 2026	digital download	Warner Music Australia	TBA
