= Under the Thunder =

2020 single by Skegss

Single by Skegss

from the album Rehearsal
- Released: 24 June 2020
- Studio: The Grove Studios
- Length: 3:37
- Label: Loma Vista; Caroline Australia
- Songwriter: Ben Reed
- Producers: Catherine Marks; Chris Collins

Skegss singles chronology
"Save It for the Weekend" (2019)	"Under the Thunder" (2020)	"Fantasising" (2020)

"Under the Thunder" is a song by the Australian trio Skegss. It was released on 11 July 2018 as the lead single from their second studio album, Rehearsal. The Kai Neville-directed music video was released on the same day.

Upon release, writer and lead vocalist Ben Reed said: "This song is about enjoying the rollercoaster of life, no one can live forever so you may as well enjoy the seasons. There's not always going to be a solution to some situations that you're in so you have to take the good with the bad and ride it out and just enjoy a beer when you can and not think about any of the bad things in your life, nature will always have its way at the end of the day."

The song polled at number 27 in the Triple J's Hottest 100 of 2020.

In February 2026, the song was certified gold by the Australian Recording Industry Association for sales and streams exceeding 35,000 copies.

== Reception ==
Al Newstead from Triple J said "Their new single 'Under the Thunder' brings a springy '70s guitar tone and a groovy, slower swagger to the Byron trio's usual slacker rock sound. Lyrically however, it's very on-brand. Frontman Benny Reed sings about just enjoying life as it comes, and taking the good with the bad."

Tyler Jenke and Poppy Reid from Rolling Stone Australia said "With 'Under the Thunder', Skegss have entered a new era of self-realisation. Stuttering riffs, squirming guitars and jangly tambourine moments; the track may start with the line 'I got many things to learn', but making notable music isn't one of them."

== Certifications ==
Region	Certification	Certified units/sales
Australia (ARIA)	Gold	35,000^{‡}
^{‡} Sales+streaming figures based on certification alone.
