= Boy Soda =

Australian musician

- Born: Brae Luafalealo
- Origin: Terrigal, New South Wales, Australia
- Genres: Soul; hip-hop; Contemporary R&B; Electronic
- Occupations: Singer; songwriter
- Instrument: Vocals
- Years active: 2019–present
- Label: Warner Music Australia (2021–present)
- Website: https://www.sodaszn.com/

Brae Luafalealo (known professionally as Boy Soda) is an Australian singer-songwriter, who released his debut single "Time for That" in 2019, and debut album Soulstar in October 2025.

== Early life and education ==
Luafalealo grew up in Terrigal on New South Wales' Central Coast. Luafalealo attended the University of Technology Sydney, studying music and sound design.

== Career ==
=== 2019–present: "Time for That" and Soulstar ===
In 2021, Boy Soda was signed to Warner Music Australia and in April 2022, released their debut EP The Distance Between Thinking and Feeling. Luafalealo described the EP as "a project of six conversations with myself about love and healing and celebration."

In October 2025, Boy Soda released the debut album Soulstar. The album was preceded with the singles "Lil' Obsession", "Blink Twice", "4K" and "Never the Same".

== Discography ==
=== Albums ===
List of albums, with release date and label shown
Title	Details	Peak chart positions
Title	Details	AUS
Soulstar	Released: 3 October 2025; Label: Boy Soda, Warner Music Australia; Formats: LP, digital download, streaming	32

=== Extended plays ===
List of EPs, with release date and label shown
Title	Details
The Distance Between Thinking and Feeling	Released: April 2022; Label: Boy Soda, Warner Music Australia; Formats: digital download, streaming

=== Mix Tapes ===
List of mix tapes, with release date and label shown
Title	Details
YC-Tape Vol:1	Released: December 2022; Label: Boy Soda, Warner Music Australia; Formats: digital download, streaming

== Awards and nominations ==
=== APRA Awards ===
The APRA Awards are presented annually from 1982 by the Australasian Performing Right Association (APRA), "honouring composers and songwriters". They commenced in 1982.

Year	Nominee / work	Award	Result	Ref.
2026	"Lil' Obsession" (Brae Luafalealo, Nikodimos Nick Millman Paleologoudias, Finbar Stuart)	Song of the Year	Shortlisted	
2026	"Lil' Obsession" (Brae Luafalealo, Nikodimos Nick Millman Paleologoudias, Finbar Stuart)	Most Performed R&B / Soul Work	Nominated	

=== ARIA Music Awards ===
The ARIA Music Awards is an annual awards ceremony that recognises excellence, innovation, and achievement across all genres of Australian music. They commenced in 1987.

Year	Nominee / work	Award	Result	Ref.
2025	"Lil' Obsession"	Best Soul/R&B Release	Won	
2026	Soulstar	Album of the Year	Nominated	
2026	Soulstar	Best Solo Artist	Nominated	
2026	Soulstar	Best Soul/R&B Release	Won	
2026	Adam Saunders for Boy Soda – "Never the Same"	Best Video	Nominated	
2026	Boy Soda – Lil Obsession Tour	Best Australian Live Act	Nominated	

=== NSW Music Prize ===
The NSW Music Prize aims to "celebrate, support and incentivise" the NSW's most talented artists, with "the aim of inspiring the next generations of stars". It commenced in 2025.

Year	Nominee / work	Award	Result	Ref.
2026	Soulstar	NSW Music Prize	Nominated	
2026	Boy Soda	NSW Breakthrough Artist of the Year	Won	
