= Holiday Food/Everyone Is Good at Something =

Holiday Food/ Everyone Is Good at Something

Compilation album by Skegss
- Released: 7 April 2017
- Recorded: 2016–2017
- Genre: Surf rock, punk rock
- Length: 37:13
- Label: Ratbag/Warner

Skegss chronology
Holiday Food (2017)	Holiday Food/ Everyone Is Good at Something (2017)	My Own Mess (2018)

Holiday Food/Everyone Is Good at Something is a compilation album of two extended plays, Everyone Is Good at Something (July 2016) and Holiday Food (April 2017), by Australian surf music and garage rock band Skegss. It was released on vinyl on 7 April 2017, at the same time as the Everyone Is Good at Something was released as a CD and DD.

The compilation was re-released in November 2020, on vinyl, and peaked at number 17 on the ARIA Albums Chart.

== Background ==
Skegss were formed as a surf music and garage rock band in Byron Bay in early 2014 Toby Cregan (p.k.a. Toby Twostring) on bass guitar, Jonny Lani (p.k.a. Jonny Layback) on drums and Ben Reed (p.k.a. Ben Ben Bogroll) on lead vocals and guitar. They toured North America in mid-2015 and signed with Ratbag Records (see Dune Rats) upon returning to Australia. The trio's third extended play, 50 Push Ups for a Dollar, appeared in October 2015.

Skegss followed with a seven-track, Everyone Is Good at Something, as their fourth EP in July 2016, which peaked at No. 4 on the ARIA Hitseekers Albums Chart. Their fifth EP, Holiday Food, with five tracks, appeared on 7 April 2017. They toured in support of the release on the No Future Tour with Sydney groups, Totty and Crocodulus, during December and January 2018. A writer for Dopamine observed, "they have built a reputation for their killer energetic live show." Save Tonight's reviewer caught their show, "the night was filled with cold beers, loud music, sweat and messy hair. Each artist brought their own energy to the stage from which absorbed by the crowd. A highlight of the night was when Skegss invited all members of Totty and Crocodylus to perform 'New York California'. The record received a huge response from the crowd as fans were thrown over the barrier."

Both EPs were also issued as a compilation album (double EP), Holiday Food/Everyone Is Good at Something on vinyl at that time. It had the five Holiday Food tracks on one side and the seven Everyone Is Good at Something tracks on the other. The compilation also appeared on the ARIA Hitseekers Albums Chart, at No. 12. The group re-issued a vinyl 12" version of the double EP compilation in November 2020. This version peaked at number 17 on the ARIA Albums Chart.

== Reception ==
Everyone Is Good at Something EP was reviewed by James Tait of Howl and Echoes, "they look to push their career to further heights with the release of their sophomore [sic] EP... [they] happen to be fantastically talented at making punk rock: three honest chords on sun-bleached guitars, chugging rhythms and lyrics reflecting both the debauchery and uncertainty of themselves and the young crowds they manage to wow over on an almost nightly basis." Kill Your Stereo's Peyton Bernhardt rated it at 75 out-of 100, "[it] plays out as an existential crisis that an indie rock aficionado may have amid a quintessentially Australian social setting... [they] are the Pharrell Williams of Aussie beach-rock, spreading the happiness around like a contagious virus that you’d be goddamn lucky to catch."

Mick Radojkovic of Lunchbox rated Holiday Food EP at three-out-of-five stars, "the quintessential (post)summer release" with "Frothing, frenetic guitars with belting, carefree vocals bring all the goods for your Sunday scatterbrained recovery sesh."

== Track listing ==
All tracks are written by Ben Reed, unless otherwise noted

Holiday Food/Everyone Is Good at Something (RATBAG012LP)
No.	Title	Length
1.	"Spring Has Sprung"	2:58
2.	"Got on My Skateboard"	3:47
3.	"You Probably Won't Die for a While"	2:51
4.	"Soaking It All In"	3:00
5.	"No Future"	2:57
6.	"Slayer"	3:02
7.	"Mustang"	3:03
8.	"My Face"	2:46
9.	"New York California" (Toby Cregan)	3:46
10.	"Van Halen"	3:51
11.	"Stranger"	2:56
12.	"Wake the Fuck Up"	2:19
Total length:		37:13

All tracks are written by Ben Reed, unless otherwise noted

Everyone Is Good at Something (SKG-CD-02)
No.	Title	Length
1.	"Slayer"	3:02
2.	"Mustang"	3:03
3.	"My Face"	2:46
4.	"New York California" (Toby Cregan)	3:46
5.	"Van Halen"	3:51
6.	"Stranger"	2:56
7.	"Wake the Fuck Up"	2:19
Total length:		21:43

All tracks are written by Ben Reed, unless otherwise noted

Holiday Food [EP] (RATBAG012SK)
No.	Title	Length
1.	"Spring Has Sprung"	2:58
2.	"Got on My Skateboard"	3:47
3.	"You Probably Won't Die for a While"	2:51
4.	"Soaking It All In"	3:00
5.	"No Future"	2:57
Total length:		15:33

== Charts ==
Chart performance of Holiday Food/Everyone Is Good at Something
Chart (2020)	Peak position
Australian Albums (ARIA)	17
