= ARIA Award for Best Soul/R&B Release =

Annual Australian music industry award

- Country: Australia
- Presented by: Australian Recording Industry Association (ARIA)
- First award: 2019
- Currently held by: Boy Soda, Soulstar (2026)

Highlights
- Most wins: Boy Soda and Tkay Maidza (2 each)
- Most nominations: Tkay Maidza (4)
- Website: ariaawards.com.au

The ARIA Music Award for Best Soul/R&B Release, is an award presented at the annual ARIA Music Awards, which recognises "the many achievements of Aussie artists across all music genres", since 1987. It is handed out by the Australian Recording Industry Association (ARIA), an organisation whose aim is "to advance the interests of the Australian record industry." A previous category, Best Urban Album, was split into Best Soul/R&B Release and Best Hip Hop Release, which were first presented in 2019.

To be eligible, the work must be within the RnB, soul, funk, reggae or dancehall genres. The nominated release must qualify for inclusion in the ARIA Album Chart, and cannot be entered in any other genre categories. The accolade is voted for by a judging school, which comprises between 40 and 100 members of representatives experienced in this genre, and is given to an artist who is either from Australia or an Australian resident. The award for Best Soul/R&B Release was first presented to Kaiit for the single, "Miss Shiney". Tkay Maidza became the first artist to win twice in this category in 2024, followed by Boy Soda with his second consecutive win in 2026. Maidza also has the most nominations with four. Pania and Tash Sultana are tied for the most nominations without a win, with three each. American duo EarthGang, who won in 2023 along with Forest Claudette as a featured artist on "Mess Around", are the only non-Australian nominee.

== Winners and nominees ==
In the following table, the winner is highlighted in a separate colour, and in boldface; the nominees are those that are not highlighted or in boldface.

Winner marked in a separate colour

Year	Winner(s)	Album/single title
**2019** (33rd)
**2019** (33rd)	**Kaiit**	"**Miss Shiney**"
**2019** (33rd)	Adrian Eagle	"AOK"
**2019** (33rd)	Genesis Owusu	""WUTD + Vultures"
**2019** (33rd)	Matt Corby	Rainbow Valley
**2019** (33rd)	Tash Sultana	"Can't Buy Happiness"
**2020** (34th)
**2020** (34th)	**Miiesha**	**Nyaaringu**
**2020** (34th)	Genesis Owusu	"Don't Need You"
**2020** (34th)	Kian	"Every Hour"
**2020** (34th)	Tash Sultana	"Pretty Lady"
**2020** (34th)	Tkay Maidza	Last Year Was Weird, Vol.2
**2021** (35th)
**2021** (35th)	**Tkay Maidza**	**Last Year Was Weird (Vol. 3)**
**2021** (35th)	Budjerah	Budjerah (EP)
**2021** (35th)	Hiatus Kaiyote	Mood Valiant
**2021** (35th)	Jack Britten & Ngaiire	3
**2021** (35th)	Tash Sultana	Terra Firma
**2022** (36th)
**2022** (36th)	**Budjerah**	**Conversations**
**2022** (36th)	Emma Donovan & the Putbacks	Under These Streets
**2022** (36th)	Kian	Shine
**2022** (36th)	Vanessa Amorosi	City of Angels
**2023** (37th)
**2023** (37th)	**Forest Claudette (featuring EarthGang)**	**"Mess Around"**
**2023** (37th)	Chanel Loren	"Rollin"
**2023** (37th)	Jada Weazel	"Skin"
**2023** (37th)	Kye	"Ribena"
**2023** (37th)	Pania	"P Stands 4 Playa"
**2024** (38th)
**2024** (38th)	**Tkay Maidza**	**Sweet Justice**
**2024** (38th)	Forest Claudette	Jupiter
**2024** (38th)	Milan Ring	Mangos
**2024** (38th)	Miss Kaninna	"Blak Britney"
**2024** (38th)	Pania	We Still Young
**2025** (39th)
**2025** (39th)	**Boy Soda**	**"Lil' Obsession"**
**2025** (39th)	Jacoténe	"Why'd You Do That?"
**2025** (39th)	Jerome Farah	Chlorine
**2025** (39th)	Larissa Lambert	"Cardio"
**2025** (39th)	Pania	"Pity Party"
**2026** (40th)
**2026** (40th)	**Boy Soda**	**Soulstar**
**2026** (40th)	Becca Hatch	"Garden (Bang Goes the Drum)"
**2026** (40th)	Larissa Lambert	"I Love You Out Loud"
**2026** (40th)	Miss Kaninna	"Backstreets"
**2026** (40th)	Tkay Maidza	"Romanticize"

== Artists with multiple nominations ==
4 nominations

- Tkay Maidza

3 nominations

- Pania
- Tash Sultana

2 nominations

- Boy Soda
- Budjerah
- Forest Claudette
- Kian
- Larissa Lambert
- Miss Kaninna
- Genesis Owusu
