= Pania (given name) =

Pania or Pānia is a feminine given name. Notable people with the name include:

- Pania Hika, Australian singer
- Pania Newton (born 1990 or 1991), New Zealand lawyer and activist
- Pānia Papa (born 1970), New Zealand netball player and activist
- Pania Rose (born 1984), Australian fashion model
- Pania Tyson-Nathan, New Zealand businesswoman
