= Comfort to Me =

Studio album by Amyl and the Sniffers
- Released: 10 September 2021
- Studio: Soundpark (Melbourne)
- Length: 34:51
- Labels: B2B; Flightless
- Producers: Amyl and the Sniffers; Dan Luscombe

Amyl and the Sniffers chronology
Amyl and the Sniffers (2019)	Comfort to Me (2021)	Cartoon Darkness (2024)

Singles from Comfort to Me
- 1. "Guided by Angels" Released: 7 July 2021; 2. "Security" Released: 29 July 2021; 3. "Hertz" Released: 10 September 2021

Comfort to Me is the second studio album by Australian pub rock and punk band Amyl and the Sniffers. It was released on 10 September 2021 by B2B Records in Australia, Rough Trade Records in Europe and ATO Records in North America.

The album reached No. 2 in Australia and No. 21 on the UK Albums Chart.

At the J Awards of 2021, the album was nominated for Australian Album of the Year.

At the AIR Awards of 2022, the album was nominated for Independent Album of the Year and won Best Independent Punk Album or EP.

At the 2022 ARIA Music Awards, the album was nominated for Album of the Year, Best Group and Best Rock Album.

== Album Artwork ==
The artwork for Comfort to Me was designed by Bráulio Amado.

== Critical reception ==
Professional ratings
Aggregate scores
Source	Rating
AnyDecentMusic?	8.3/10
Metacritic	85/100
Review scores
Source	Rating
AllMusic	4.5/5 stars
Clash	9/10
Classic Rock	7/10
DIY	4/5 stars
Kerrang!	5/5
The Line of Best Fit	9/10
Mojo	4/5 stars
NME	5/5 stars
Pitchfork	7.6/10
The Skinny	4/5 stars

According to the review aggregator Metacritic, Comfort to Me received "universal acclaim" based on a weighted average score of 85 out of 100 from 12 critic scores.

== Track listing ==
All lyrics are written by Amy Taylor; all music is composed by Amyl and the Sniffers.

Comfort to Me track listing
No.	Title	Length
1.	"Guided by Angels"	2:59
2.	"Freaks to the Front"	1:41
3.	"Choices"	2:20
4.	"Security"	3:47
5.	"Hertz"	2:33
6.	"No More Tears"	2:57
7.	"Maggot"	3:21
8.	"Capital"	2:45
9.	"Don't Fence Me in"	2:40
10.	"Knifey"	3:30
11.	"Don't Need a Cunt (Like You to Love Me)"	1:31
12.	"Laughing"	1:44
13.	"Snakes"	3:03
Total length:		34:51

Japanese edition (bonus track)
No.	Title	Length
14.	"Crave"

== Personnel ==
Amyl and the Sniffers

- Amy Taylor – vocals, production
- Dec Mehrtens – guitar, production
- Gus Romer – bass, production
- Bryce Wilson – drums, production

Additional contributors

- Dan Luscombe – production
- Bernie Grundman – mastering
- Nick Launay – mixing
- Bonnie Knight – engineering
- Jamie Woziekonski – photography
- Bráulio Amado – artwork

== Charts ==
Chart performance of Comfort to Me
Chart (2021)	Peak position
Australian Albums (ARIA)	2
Belgian Albums (Ultratop Flanders)	185
Belgian Albums (Ultratop Wallonia)	83
German Albums (Offizielle Top 100)	22
Irish Albums (IRMA)	88
Scottish Albums (Official Charts)	12
Spanish Albums (Promusicae)	64
Swiss Albums (Schweizer Hitparade)	98
UK Albums (Official Charts)	21
UK Rock & Metal Albums (Official Charts)	3
US Top Album Sales (Billboard)	18
