= Smogged Out =

2018 single by Skegss

Single by Skegss

from the album My Own Mess
- Released: 11 July 2018
- Length: 2:54
- Label: Skegss
- Songwriter: Ben Reed
- Producers: Dylan Adams; Chris Collins

Skegss singles chronology
"Up in the Clouds" (2018)	"Smogged Out" (2018)	"Stop" (2018)

"Smogged Out" is a song by the Australian trio Skegss. It was released on 11 July 2018 as the second single from their debut studio album, My Own Mess.

The song polled at number 71 in the Triple J Hottest 100, 2018.

In 2025, the song was certified gold by the Australian Recording Industry Association for stream-equivalent units and sales exceeding 35,000 copies.

== Certifications ==
Region	Certification	Certified units/sales
Australia (ARIA)	Gold	35,000^{‡}
^{‡} Sales+streaming figures based on certification alone.
