= 50 Push Ups for a Dollar =

EP by Skegss
- Released: 16 October 2015
- Recorded: May 2015
- Studio: Converse Rubber Tracks Studio; New York City
- Genre: Surf rock, punk rock
- Length: 13:27
- Label: Ratbag/Warner

Skegss chronology
3 Songs We Recorded with Adam When We Were in Melbourne (2015)	50 Push Ups for a Dollar (2015)	Everyone Is Good at Something (2016)

Singles from 50 Push Ups for a Dollar
- 1. "Fun" Released: July 2015; 2. "Eat It" Released: October 2015

50 Push Ups for a Dollar is a five-track extended play by Australian surf music and garage rock band Skegss, released on 16 October 2015. It provided two singles, "Fun" (July 2015) and "Eat It" (October). The EP's cover art was designed by Jack Irvine of Space 44. In March 2016 United States hip hop collaborators Reese x Lil Yachty released a single, "Do It". That single's cover art was described by Irvine, "they have just straight up taken the artwork, erased 'Skegss' and put their song title and not even changed anything else. And also, it's a horrible Photoshop edit looks like it was done in Microsoft Paint." The EP was re-released in October 2020 with the lead track from their 2014 single, "L.S.D.", added. It peaked at number 4 on the ARIA Albums Chart.

== Background ==
Skegss formed as a four-piece surf music and garage rock band in Byron Bay in early 2014. They released their debut single, "L.S.D." (a.k.a. "Live Sleep Die"), in mid-year. Their founding guitarist, Noa Deane, left in the following year to focus on his surfing career. Skegss continued as a trio, Toby Cregan (p.k.a. Toby Twostring) on bass guitar, Jonny Lani (p.k.a. Jonny Layback) on drums and Ben Reed (p.k.a. Ben Ben Bogroll) on lead vocals and guitar. They toured North America in mid-2015 and signed with Ratbag Records (see Dune Rats) upon returning to Australia. While they were in New York they recorded material at Converse Rubber Tracks.

The trio's first release for Ratbag Records was a single, "Fun", in July, which was distributed by Warner Music Australasia. They followed, in October, with its parent five-track extended play, 50 Push Ups for a Dollar, and a second single, "Eat It". The EP's cover art was designed by Jack Irvine of Space 44. In March 2016 United States hip hop collaborators Reese x Lil Yachty released a single, "Do It". Tone Deaf's Tyler Jenke reported, "[they] seem to have had their artwork ripped off by an international artist." Irvine reflected, "they have just straight up taken the artwork, erased 'Skegss' and put their song title and not even changed anything else. And also, it's a horrible Photoshop edit looks like it was done in Microsoft Paint."

To mark the EP's fifth anniversary, Skegss issued a vinyl 12" six-track version on 1 October 2020, with "L.S.D." added. This version peaked at number 4 on the ARIA Albums Chart in November 2020. It was also the highest selling vinyl record for its first week.

== Critical reception ==
Professional ratings
Review scores
Source	Rating
The AU Review	(Positive)
The Music	3.5/5 stars

The Music's Cara Oliveri rated 50 Push Ups for a Dollar at three-and-a-half stars out-of-five and stated, "brewing youthful stoner rock that doesn't take itself too seriously... [they] invite you to their epic house party full of rowdy tunes and good times."

Sosefina Fuamoli of The AU Review, felt that the EP was "everything we could've wanted from the trio. Fun, rollicking and generally down for anything, it's a mantra that has applied to [their] work and performance ethic since their break out."

== Track listing ==
All tracks are written by Ben Reed, unless otherwise noted

50 Push Ups for a Dollar track listing
No.	Title	Length
1.	"Eat It"	2:29
2.	"Fun"	3:39
3.	"New York"	2:32
4.	"Hell"	1:55
5.	"Heart Attack"	2:52
Total length:		13:27

All tracks are written by Ben Reed, unless otherwise noted

12" bonus track (LVR01156)
No.	Title	Length
6.	"L.S.D."	3:37
Total length:		17:04

== Personnel ==
Skegss

- Ben Reed – vocals, guitar, writing (1–6)
- Jonny Lani – drums (1–6)
- Toby Cregan – bass guitar (1–6)

Artwork

- Cover art – Jack Irvine of Space 44

== Charts ==
Chart performance of 50 Push Ups for a Dollar
Chart (2020)	Peak position
Australian Albums (ARIA)	4
