= Lil' Obsession =

Single by Boy Soda

from the album Soulstar
- Released: 31 January 2025
- Length: 3:01
- Label: Warner Music Australia
- Songwriters: Brae Luafalealo; Finbar Stuart
- Producer: Finbar Stuart

Boy Soda singles chronology
"LVL30." (2024)	"Lil' Obsession" (2025)	"Blink Twice" (2025)

"Lil' Obsession" is a song by Australian singer-songwriter Boy Soda. It was released in January 2025 as the lead single from their debut studio album, Soulstar.

About the single, Boy Soda said "Lil' Obsession' is about letting go, and surrendering to the reality of a relationship that's been ruptured or served its purpose."

In August 2025, Boy Soda performed the song live for Triple J Like a Version

In November 2025, A version featuring Ambré was released.

At the 2025 ARIA Music Awards, the song won Best Soul/R&B Release.

At the APRA Music Awards of 2026, the song was shortlisted for Song of the Year. It nominated for Most Performed R&B / Soul Work.

== Critical reception ==
Laura McInnes from Sniffers said "'Lil' Obsession' blends contemporary R&B with timeless live instrumentation, pulling from jazz, neo-soul, blues, and pop to craft an Anderson .Paak-esque R&B anthem with lyrics speaking to letting go of an infatuation turned expired relationship."

Amalia Castle from Oculate said "Wrapping listeners up in the sonic equivalent of a heated blanket in this latest release, BOY SODA relays sentiments on vulnerability and the dreaded breakdown of a relationship, continuing to sharpen his artist signature which sees him incorporate honest and human song writing and creative expression."

Sarah Downs from Rolling Stone Australia called the song "Smooth as hell".

== Track listings ==
Digital download
No.	Title	Length
1.	"Lil' Obsession"	3:01

Digital download
No.	Title	Length
1.	"Lil' Obsession" (featuring Ambré)	3:01
