= Rehearsal (album) =

Studio album by Skegss
- Released: 26 March 2021
- Length: 42:17
- Label: Loma Vista
- Producer: Catherine Marks

Skegss chronology
| My Own Mess (2018) | Rehearsal (2021) | Pacific Highway Music (2024) |

Singles from Rehearsal
- 1. "Under the Thunder" Released: 24 June 2020; 2. "Fantasising" Released: 16 September 2020; 3. "Wake Up" Released: 10 December 2020; 4. "Valhalla" Released: January 2021; 5. "Bush TV" Released: 26 March 2021

Rehearsal is the second studio album by Australian surf music and garage rock band Skegss, released on 26 March 2021. The album debuted at number one on the ARIA Albums Chart. Upon announcement, Skegss' Ben Reed said he was "not expecting it", and CEO of ARIA Annabelle Herd remarked that the band's "good time energy is exactly what we need right now".

At the 2021 ARIA Music Awards, Chris Collins was nominated for Engineer of the Year for work on this album.

== Track listing ==
1. "Down to Ride" – 3:23
2. "Valhalla" – 2:52
3. "Fantasising" – 3:28
4. "Running from Nothing" – 3:54
5. "Bush TV" – 2:50
6. "Picturesque Moment" – 3:06
7. "Under the Thunder" – 3:37
8. "Sip of Wine" – 2:54
9. "Curse My Happiness" – 2:45
10. "Wake Up" – 3:48
11. "Savour the Flavour" – 3:32
12. "Fade Away" – 3:25
13. "Lucky" – 2:43

== Charts ==
=== Weekly charts ===
Chart performance for Rehearsal
| Chart (2021) | Peak position |
|---|---|
| Australian Albums (ARIA) | 1 |

=== Year-end charts ===
| Chart (2021) | Position |
|---|---|
| Australian Artist Albums (ARIA) | 40 |

== See also ==
- List of number-one albums of 2021 (Australia)
