= L.S.D. (Skegss song) =

2014 debut single by Skegss

Single by Skegss

from the album Skegss
- Released: July 2014
- Length: 3:37
- Label: Skegss
- Songwriter: Ben Reed

Skegss singles chronology
"L.S.D." (2014)	"Rock'n'Roll Radio" (2014)

"L.S.D." (abbreviation of "Live Sleep Die") is a song by the Australian trio Skegss. It was released in July 2014 as their debut single and lead single from their debut self-titled extended play.

In 2024, the song was certified platinum by the Australian Recording Industry Association for sales and streams exceeding 70,000 copies.

== Music video ==
The video for "L.S.D." was released on 30 July 2014.

== Track listing ==
- Digital single
1. "L.S.D." – 3:37
- US CD single
1. "L.S.D." – 3:37
2. "Rock'n'Roll Radio"
3. "Spinning"
4. "Glow in the Dark"

== Certifications ==
Region	Certification	Certified units/sales
Australia (ARIA)	Platinum	70,000^{‡}
New Zealand (RMNZ)	Gold	15,000^{‡}
^{‡} Sales+streaming figures based on certification alone.
