= U Should Not Be Doing That =

Single by Amyl and the Sniffers

from the album Cartoon Darkness
- B-side: "Facts"
- Released: 21 May 2024
- Genre: Punk
- Length: 3:26
- Label: B2B; Virgin Music; Amyl and the Sniffers
- Songwriters: Amy Taylor; Declan Mehrtens; Fergus Romer; Bryce Wilson
- Producer: Nick Launay

Amyl and the Sniffers singles chronology
"Hertz" (2021)	"U Should Not Be Doing That" / "Facts" (2024)	"Chewing Gum" (2024)

Music video
- "U Should Not Be Doing That" on YouTube

"U Should Not Be Doing That" is a song by punk band Amyl and the Sniffers, released through B2B and Virgin Music on 21 May 2024 as the lead single from their third studio album, Cartoon Darkness (2024).

"U Should Not Be Doing That" was the recipient of various awards and nominations, including winning Song of the Year at the 2025 APRA Music Awards and Independent Song of the Year at the 2025 AIR Awards, being shortlisted for Best Single at the 2025 Rolling Stone Australia Awards, and being nominated for Best Video at the 2024 ARIA Awards and Best Rock Performance at the 2026 Grammy Awards.

The song placed at number 34 on Australian youth broadcaster Triple J's Hottest 100 of 2024.

== Background and release ==
Of the song, frontwoman Amy Taylor said: "Lyrically it's pretty self-explanatory... it's also in a way poking fun at the shock that people still feel at a little bit of skimpy clothing, and the bitchy high school way that the music community still is but it mainly makes me laugh. It's unconscious and meant nothing at the time of writing it but now I think it's a comedic way of rubbing the dog's nose in its own dog piss after it peed on your favourite rug or something."

"U Should Not Be Doing That" and "Facts" was released as a double A-side on 24 May 2024 via B2B Records and Virgin Music Group.

== Recording ==
"U Should Not Be Doing That" was recorded (alongside "Facts") with American record producer Nick Launay. The song was written by the band's four members—Amy Taylor, Bryce Wilson, Declan Mehrtens, and Gus Romer—and was produced and mastered by Launey and American audio engineer Bernie Grundman, respectively. Australian musician Harry Cooper plays the saxophone.

== Critical reception ==
Laura Rosierse from When the Horn Blows said "Delicious grit and an unapologetic punk sound make this a fantastic anthem with some dark yet refreshing punches."

== Commercial performance ==
"U Should Not Be Doing That" debuted and peaked at number twenty on the United Kingdom's Singles Sales Chart, number two on the Physical Sales Chart, and number one on the Vinyl Singles Sales Chart.

"U Should Not Be Doing That" placed at number 34 on Triple J's Hottest 100 of 2024.

== Music video ==
The music video was directed by John Angus Stewart and features Canadian actor Steven Ogg.

== Track listings ==
All tracks are written by * Amy Taylor, Declan Mehrtens, Fergus Romer, and Bryce Wilson.

"U Should Not Be Doing That" single track listing
No.	Title	Length
1.	"U Should Not Be Doing That"	3:26
2.	"Facts"	2:36
Total length:		5:02

"U Should Not Be Doing That" (Chris Lorenzo remix) track listing
No.	Title	Length
1.	"U Should Not Be Doing That" (with Chris Lorenzo)	3:42

== Credits and personnel ==
Adapted from the parent album's liner notes.

Amyl and the Sniffers:

- Amy Taylor – vocals, writing
- Bryce Wilson – drums, writing
- Declan Mehrtens – guitar, backing vocals, writing
- Gus Romer – bass, backing vocals, writing

=== Other musicians ===
- Nick Launay – production, recording, mixing
- Bernie Grundman – mastering
- Harry Cooper – saxophone

== Charts ==
"U Should Not Be Doing That" chart performance
Chart (2024)	Peak position
UK Singles Sales (Official Charts)	20
UK Physical Sales (Official Charts)	2
UK Vinyl Singles (Official Charts)	1

== Release history ==
"U Should Not Be Doing That" release history and details
Region	Date	Format(s)	Label	Catalogue	Ref.
Various	24 May 2024	Digital download; streaming	B2B Records / Virgin Music	Not applicable	
United Kingdom	24 May 2024	7" vinyl	B2B Records / Virgin Music	AU2DY2400085	

== Cover versions ==
Scottish band Franz Ferdinand covered the song in 2026 for Like a Version. Gut Health performed a version at the 2025 2025 APRA Awards. Chris Lorenzo has made a remix of the song.
