= Keenan Te =

Australian singer-songwriter

- Born: December 26, 2000 (age 25); Melbourne, Australia
- Origin: Australia
- Genres: Pop; R&B; Bedroom pop
- Occupations: Singer; Songwriter
- Years active: 2020–present
- Label: ACTS Music Group
- Website: https://www.keenante.com

Keenan Te is an Australian singer-songwriter of Vietnamese and Cambodian heritage. He is known for piano-driven ballads and songs that gained popularity through TikTok.

== Early life ==
Te was born and raised in Melbourne, Australia. He is of part-Vietnamese and part-Cambodian descent. He grew up as the child of immigrants in a Western society.

He began posting singing videos on social media while in high school. He has stated that he treated platforms such as TikTok as a deliberate way to build a music career rather than a casual hobby.

== Career ==
Te released early singles including "Hello" in 2020. His breakthrough came with the 2021 single "Dependent" which went viral on TikTok.

He also released singles such as "Never Let You Go", "Forgot About Us," and "Scars" further increased his streaming numbers. "Scars" became one of his most-streamed tracks, exceeding 80 million plays on Spotify.

He has released additional singles including "Where You Are," "Rest of My Life" and "Constellations," and has collaborated with artists such as yaeow, Peder Elias, and others.

In 2026 he prepared and released material connected to his debut studio album Afterthought, which expands his earlier piano-ballad style with elements of R&B, bedroom pop, and 1980s-inspired synths.

Te has performed headline shows in Australia and undertaken press and tour activity in Southeast Asia and other international markets.
