= Hertz (song) =

Single by Amyl and the Sniffers

from the album Comfort to Me
- Released: 10 September 2021
- Length: 2:33
- Label: B2B; Rough Trade; Amyl and the Sniffers
- Songwriters: Amy Taylor; Declan Mehrtens; Fergus Romer
- Producer: Dan Luscombe

Amyl and the Sniffers singles chronology
"Security" (2021)	"Hertz" (2021)	"U Should Not Be Doing That" (2024)

Music video
- "Hertz" on YouTube

"Hertz" is a song by punk band Amyl and the Sniffers, released by B2B and Rough Trade on 10 September 2021, as the third and final single from their second studio album Comfort to Me (2021).

"Hertz" received a nomination for Best Video at the 2022 ARIA Awards.

== Background ==
Upon release, frontwoman Amy Taylor said that "Hertz" was "a daydream of wanting to go to the country/bush and see landscapes other than the city. It was written in 2019 but it very much sounds like a pandemic song, because it's a daydream about being repulsed by confinement, and frustrated over being stuck in one place."

== Critical reception ==
Tom Breihan from Stereogum opined that "Amy Taylor bellows over serrated guitars, loudly informing us that she would very much like a romantic-getaway weekend at the beach or the country or perhaps both. There's a fun contrast between the fantastical, escapist lyrics and the frantic music." Reviewing Comfort to Me for Australian radio station Triple J, music journalists Al Newstead and Lucy Smith felt that "if cuts like "Hertz", "Security" and "Guided by Angels" don't immediately have you reaching to crank the volume, you might wanna check your pulse."

== Awards and nominations ==
ARIA Award nominations for "Hertz"
Year	Nominee / work	Award	Result	Ref.
2022	"Hertz"	Best Video	Nominated	

== Track listing ==
All tracks are written by Amy Taylor.

"Hertz" track listing
No.	Title	Length
1.	"Hertz"	2:33
2.	"Security"	3:47
3.	"Guided by Angels"	2:59
Total length:		9:19

== Credits and personnel ==
Adapted from the parent album's liner notes.

Amyl and the Sniffers:

- Amy Taylor – vocals, writing
- Declan Mehrtens – guitar, backing vocals, writing
- Gus Romer – bass, backing vocals
- Bryce Wilson – drums

=== Other musicians ===
- Dan Luscombe – production
- Bernie Grundman – mastering
- Nick Launay – mixing
- Bonnie Knight – engineering

== Certifications ==
List of certifications for "Hertz"
Region	Certification	Certified units/sales
Australia (ARIA)	Gold	35,000^{‡}
^{‡} Sales+streaming figures based on certification alone.

== Release history ==
"Hertz" release history and details
Region	Date	Format(s)	Label(s)	Ref.
Various	10 September 2021	Digital download; streaming	B2B; Rough Trade; Amyl and the Sniffers	
