= El Coyote Cafe =

Mexican restaurant in Los Angeles

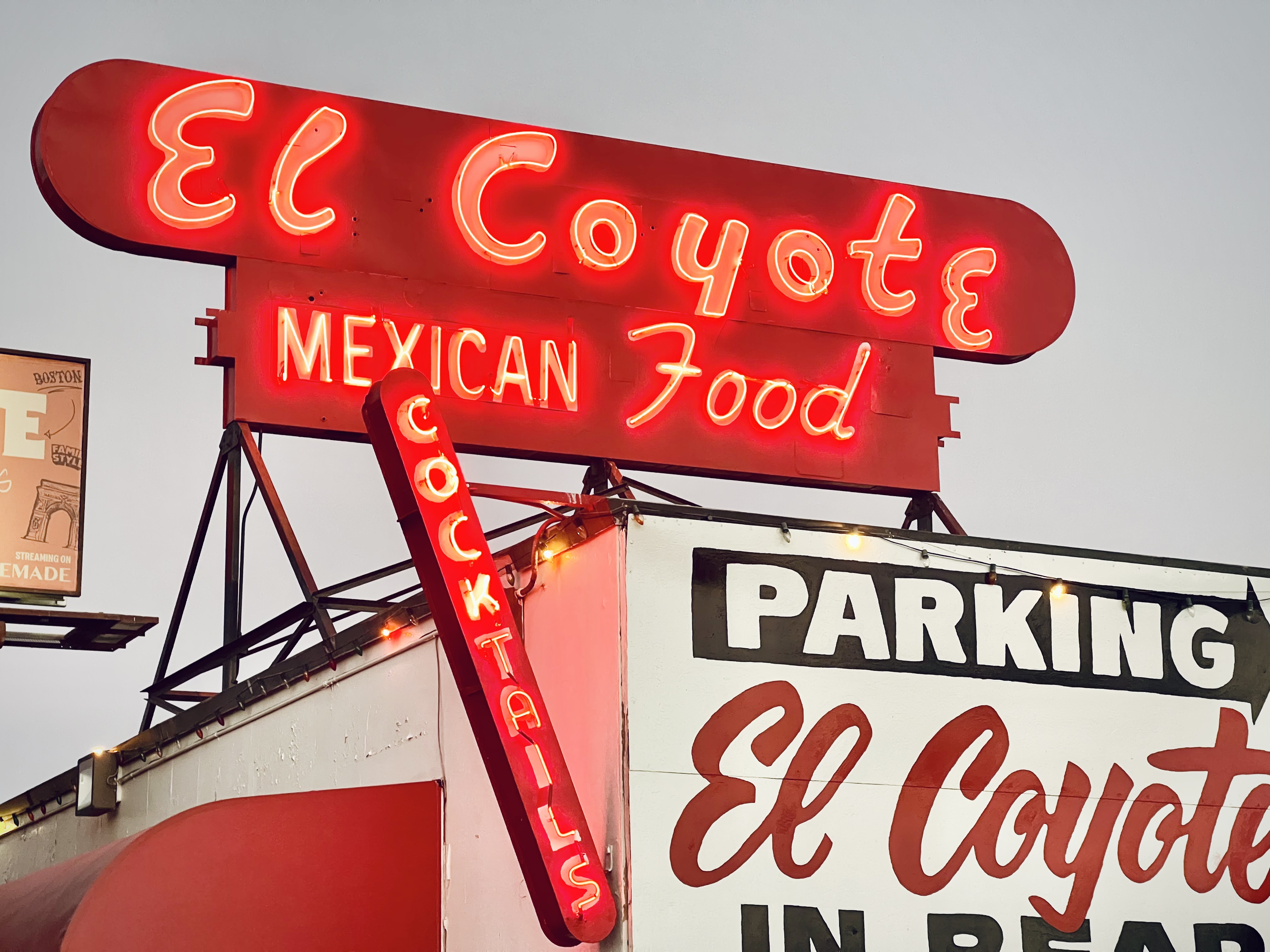
- Exterior of El Coyote Cafe, 2022
- Interactive map of El Coyote Cafe

Restaurant information
- Established: March 5, 1931; 95 years ago
- Location: 7312 Beverly Boulevard, Los Angeles, Los Angeles, California, 90036
- Coordinates: 34°4′33.61″N 118°20′57.31″W
- Website: www.elcoyotecafe.com

El Coyote Cafe is a Mexican restaurant in Los Angeles that opened on March 5, 1931. It is most notable for being the location of the final meal of four of the victims of the Manson family murders.

== History ==
Opened in 1931 by Blanche and George March, the tiny cafe was originally located at First and La Brea. In 1951 El Coyote moved to its present location on Beverly Boulevard. Today there are eight rooms and a patio where an average of 1,000 meals are served daily. Their margaritas have been voted the city's best by Los Angeles magazine and the Los Angeles Times. They have also grown to 95 staff members. They have a seating capacity of 375.

Sharon Tate, Jay Sebring, Abigail Folger, and Wojciech Frykowski ate their last meal at El Coyote on the night of August 8, 1969; they were later murdered by three members of the Manson Family. The movie Once Upon a Time in Hollywood recreated the scene, using the same booth Tate sat in when she dined there.

In 2008, activists called to boycott the Cafe after it became known that Marjorie Christoffersen, a manager at the restaurant and daughter of the owner, had donated $100 in support of Proposition 8, a ballot initiative to block marriage rights for gay people. Christoffersen held a free brunch for activists in which Christoffersen apologized for causing offense, but refused to renounce her support of the ban, which she attributed to her Mormon faith. The boycott was partly because the restaurant had been known as a gay hangout, which "hit too close to home" according to one organizer. The boycott was responsible for slashing revenue by 30%.

El Coyote celebrated its 80th anniversary on March 13, 2011, with 75¢ dinner specials.
