= Pania (singer) =

- Born: Melbourne, Australia
- Genres: Electronic music; hip-hop; R&B music
- Occupations: singer, songwriter
- Years active: 2020–present

Pania is an Australian singer from Melbourne, Australia. She is named after the Māori mythology of the same name. She has Māori and Indian background.

In 2026, she won an APRA Music Award for "Pity Party".

== Career ==
=== 2020-present ===
Pania released her debut single in 2020.

In November 2022, Pania released her debut EP Burnt UR Clothes and Changed the Addy.

In 2023, Pania released her second EP We Still Young.

In September 2025, Pania released her third EP Coming to Terms featuring the singles "Pity Party", "Switch Sides" and "Pretty Girl Fly".

== Discography ==
=== Extended plays ===
Title	Details
Burnt UR Clothes and Changed the Addy	Released: November 2022; Label: Pania, Say Less, Warner; Formats: Digital download
We Still Young	Released: September 2023; Label: Say Less, Warner; Formats: Digital download
Coming 2 Terms	Released: September 2025; Label: Say Less, Warner; Formats: Digital download

== Awards and nominations ==
=== APRA Music Awards ===
The APRA Music Awards were established by Australasian Performing Right Association (APRA) in 1982 to honour the achievements of songwriters and music composers, and to recognise their song writing skills, sales and airplay performance, by its members annually.

Year	Nominee / work	Award	Result	Ref.
2026	"Pity Pary" (Pania Hika / Jake Amy / Chelsea Warner / Sam Verghese)	Most Performed Blues & Roots Work	Won	

=== ARIA Music Awards ===
The ARIA Music Awards is an annual awards ceremony that recognises excellence, innovation, and achievement across all genres of Australian music. They commenced in 1987.

Year	Nominee / work	Award	Result	Ref.
2023	"P Stands 4 Playa"	Best Soul/R&B Release	Nominated	
2024	We Still Young	Best Soul/R&B Release	Nominated	
2025	"Pity Party"	Best Soul/R&B Release	Nominated	
