= Amyl and the Sniffers (album) =

Studio album by Amyl and the Sniffers
- Released: 24 May 2019
- Studio: McCall Sound (Sheffield)
- Genre: Pub rock; punk rock; garage rock; glam rock
- Length: 29:00
- Label: Flightless
- Producer: Ross Orton

Amyl and the Sniffers chronology
Big Attraction (2017)	Amyl and the Sniffers (2019)	Comfort to Me (2021)

Singles from Amyl and the Sniffers
- 1. "Cup of Destiny" Released: 15 March 2018; 2. "Some Mutts (Can't Be Muzzled)" Released: 21 September 2018; 3. "Monsoon Rock" Released: 5 March 2019; 4. "Got You" Released: 10 April 2019; 5. "Gacked on Anger" Released: 20 May 2019

Amyl and the Sniffers is the debut studio album by Australian pub rock and punk band Amyl and the Sniffers. It was released on 24 May 2019 by Rough Trade Records and has received generally positive reviews.

The album reached No. 22 in Australia and No. 91 on the UK Albums Chart.

At the ARIA Music Awards of 2019, the album won the ARIA Award for Best Rock Album.

== Critical reception ==
Professional ratings
Aggregate scores
Source	Rating
Metacritic	81/100
Review scores
Source	Rating
AllMusic	3.5/5 stars
Clash	8/10
The Line of Best Fit	8/10
Pitchfork	7.2/10

According to the review aggregator Metacritic, Amyl and the Sniffers received "universal acclaim" based on a weighted average score of 81 out of 100 from 14 critic scores.

== Track listing ==
All lyrics are written by Amy Taylor.

No.	Title	Length
1.	"Starfire 500"	3:36
2.	"Gacked on Anger"	1:49
3.	"Cup of Destiny"	2:15
4.	"GFY"	1:48
5.	"Angel"	2:50
6.	"Monsoon Rock"	2:25
7.	"Control"	2:34
8.	"Got You"	2:18
9.	"Punisha"	1:44
10.	"Shake Ya"	3:17
11.	"Some Mutts (Can't Be Muzzled)"	4:22
Total length:		29:00

== Personnel ==
Amyl and the Sniffers

- Amy Taylor – vocals
- Dec Mehrtens – guitar
- Bryce Wilson – drums
- Gus Romer – bass

Additional contributors

- Ross Orton – production, mixing, recording
- Dick Beetham – mastering
- David Kuratsu – engineering, production assistance, mixing assistance, recording assistance
- Ben Jones – artwork
- Jamie Wdziekonski – photography

== Charts ==
Chart performance of Amyl and the Sniffers
Chart (2018)	Peak position
Australian Albums (ARIA)	22
Scottish Albums (OCC)	33
UK Albums (OCC)	91
UK Rock & Metal Albums (OCC)	3
US Independent Albums (Billboard)	28
