= Amyl and the Sniffers =

Australian pub rock and punk band

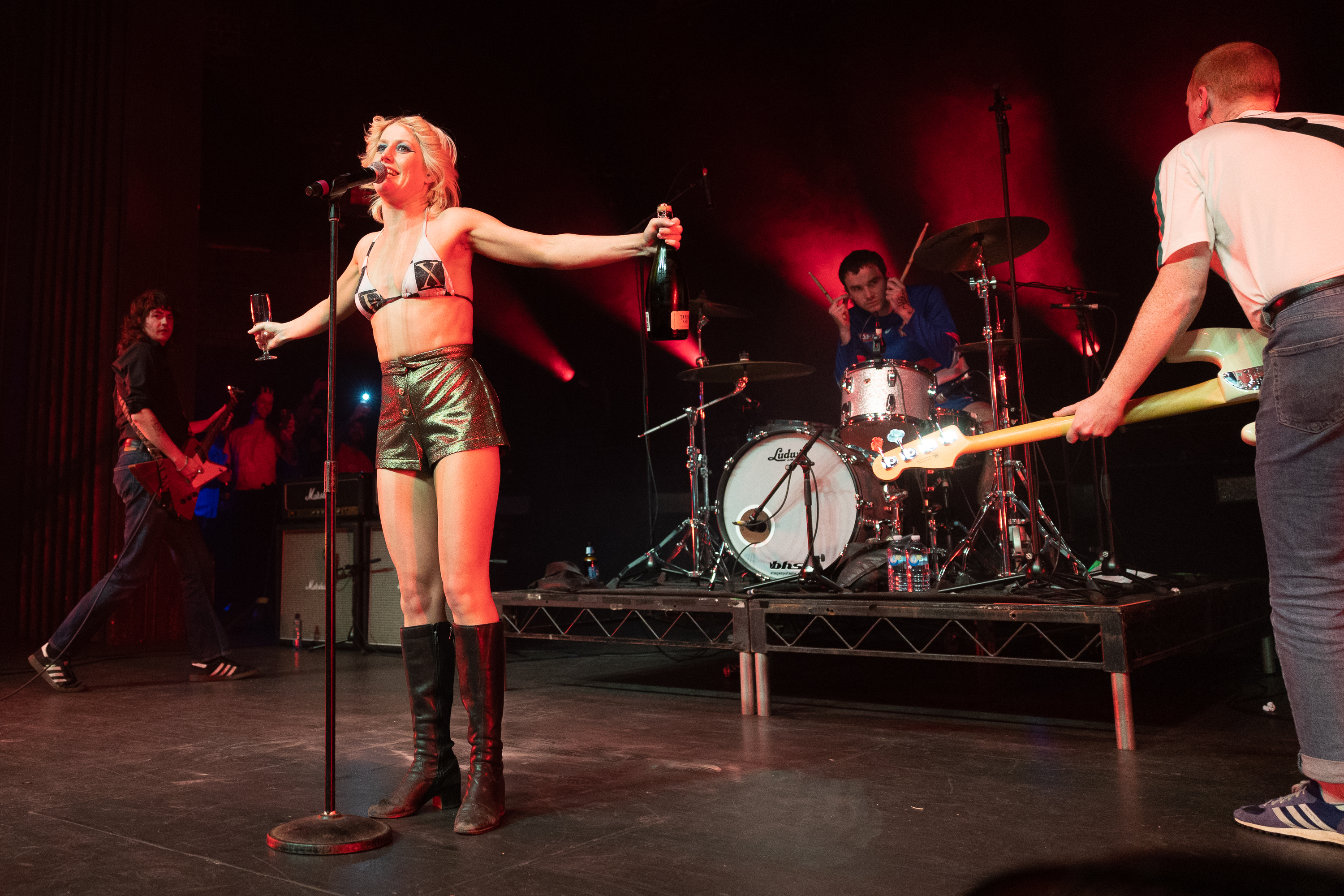
- Amyl and the Sniffers performing in 2022

Background information
- Origin: Melbourne, Victoria, Australia
- Genres: Pub rock; punk rock; garage rock
- Years active: 2016–present
- Labels: ATO; Flightless; Rough Trade; B2B Records / Virgin Music Group
- Members: Amy Taylor; Bryce Wilson; Declan Mehrtens; Gus Romer
- Past members: Calum Newton
- Website: amylandthesniffers.com

Amyl and the Sniffers are an Australian pub rock and punk band based in Melbourne, consisting of vocalist Amy Taylor, drummer Bryce Wilson, guitarist Declan Mehrtens, and bassist Gus Romer. They released their debut album, Amyl and the Sniffers, in 2019. Their second album, Comfort to Me, was released in 2021, followed by their third album, Cartoon Darkness, in 2024. They have been nominated for nine ARIA Awards and have won three, including for Best Group in 2022.

The band takes its name from the slang for amyl nitrite, also known as poppers. Taylor compared their music to the drug in an interview with Paul Glynn of the BBC: "In Australia we call poppers Amyl. So you sniff it, it lasts for 30 seconds and then you have a headache – and that's what we're like!" Their sound has been compared to 1970s punk rock groups such as Iggy and the Stooges and the Damned. Taylor has cited a number of varying influences including Minor Threat, Ceremony, AC/DC, Sleaford Mods, Dolly Parton and Cardi B.

== History ==
=== 2016–2017: Giddy Up and Big Attraction ===
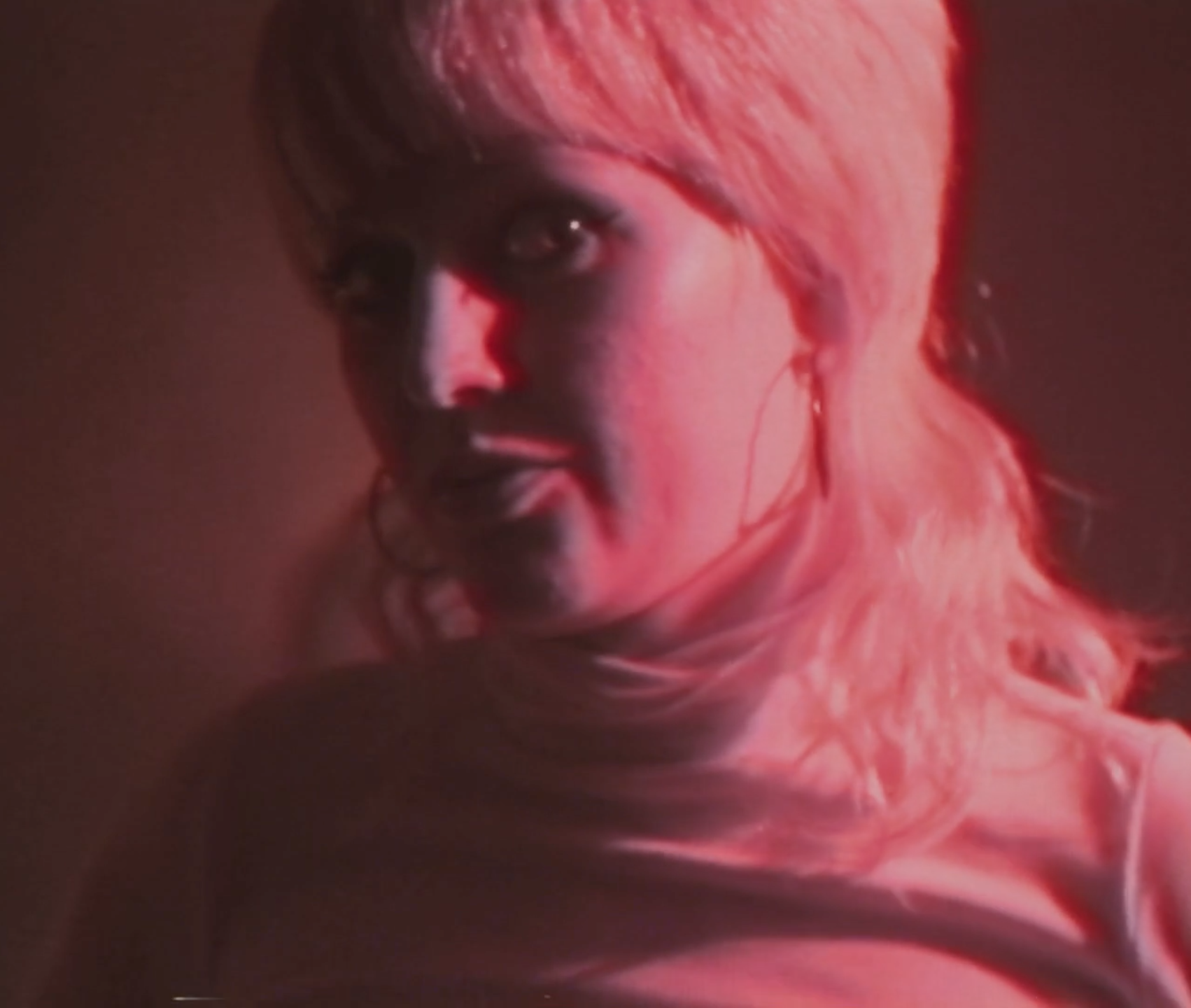
Vocalist Amy Taylor in a live recording 2017

The band was formed by housemates Amy Taylor, Bryce Wilson, Declan Mehrtens, and Calum Newton in Balaclava, Melbourne. The four wrote, recorded, and released their first EP, Giddy Up, in a span of 12 hours. Newton left the band to pursue a solo career and was replaced by Gus Romer in early 2017.

A second EP, Big Attraction, was released in March 2017.

=== 2018–present: Amyl and the Sniffers, Comfort to Me, and Cartoon Darkness ===
In 2018, the band went into the studio to record their debut album with producer and former Add N to (X) drummer Ross Orton. The result was Amyl and the Sniffers, released on 24 May 2019. It received generally positive reviews, including a 7.2 from Pitchfork and 4 out of 5 stars from NME and AllMusic. In light of the album's release, Happy Mag placed the band at No. 9 on their list of "The 15 Australian female artists changing the game right now", praising Taylor for being "one of hardest rocking people on the face of the planet." The 2018 single "Some Mutts" was used in Warwick Thornton's 2021/22 vampire TV series Firebite.

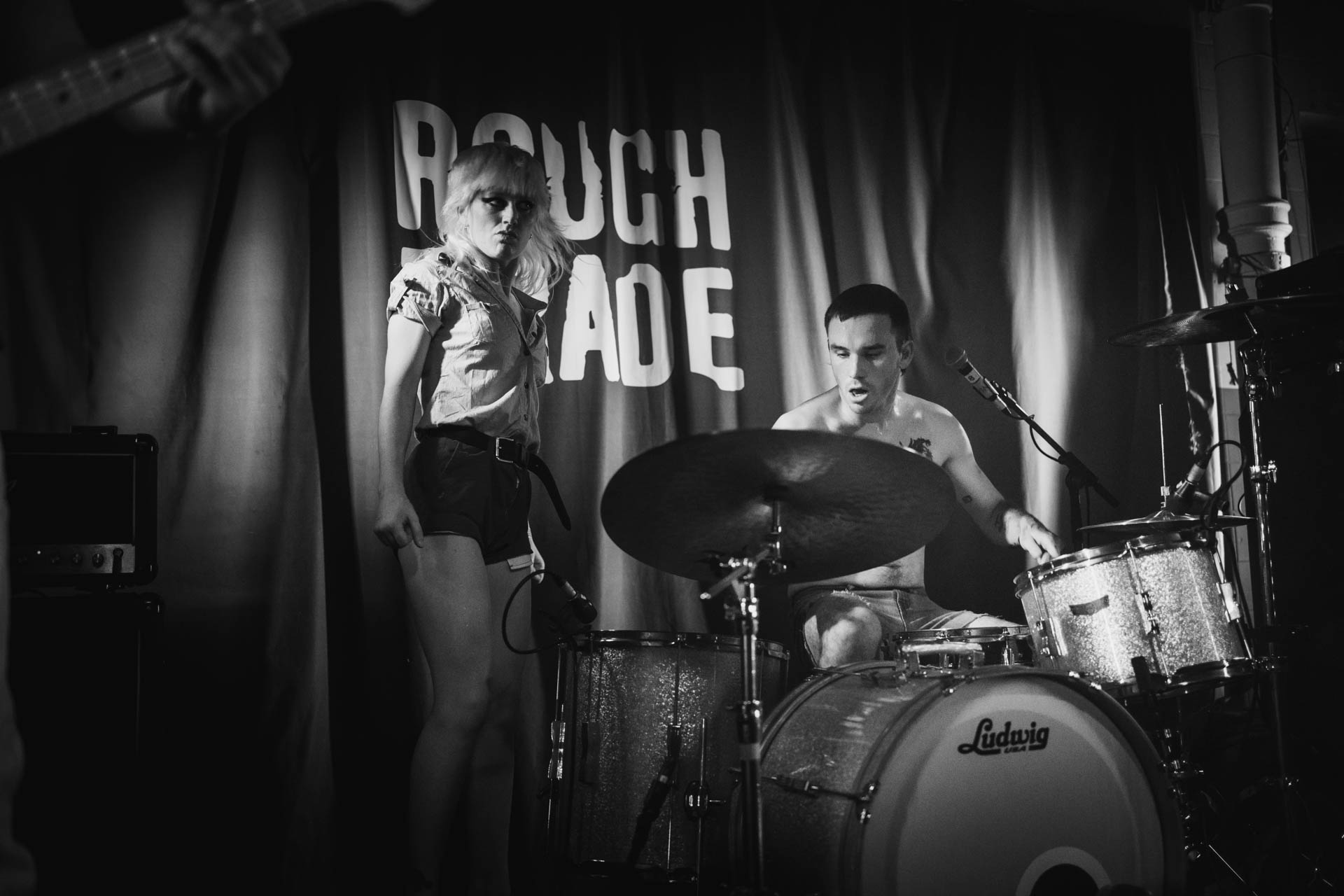
Amyl and the Sniffers in 2021

At the ARIA Music Awards of 2019, Amyl and the Sniffers won the ARIA Award for Best Rock Album. In February 2020, the album was nominated for the Australian Music Prize of 2019.

On 7 July 2021, Amyl and the Sniffers announced their second album, Comfort to Me, alongside the lead single "Guided by Angels". Later in July, the band released another single, "Security". Three days prior to the release of the album the band released a final single, "Hertz", alongside a complementary music video. The full Comfort to Me album was initially scheduled for release in early October 2021, but it was pushed up and released on 10 September. The album was recorded at Sound Park, in Melbourne.

In June and July 2022, the band opened for Weezer, Fall Out Boy, and Green Day on the European leg of the Hella Mega Tour. In April 2023, the band toured with the Smashing Pumpkins and Jane's Addiction. In March 2024, Amyl and the Sniffers announced a US headline tour set for July and August 2024, in addition to their US shows as support for Foo Fighters.

In May 2024, the band released the single "U Should Not Be Doing That", the first single from their upcoming album. after which they announced a UK and European Headline tour set for November 2024. On 21 August 2024, the group announced that their third album, Cartoon Darkness, would be released on 25 October 2024. The single and music video for "Chewing Gum" was released on the same day. "Big Dreams", the album's third single, was released on 25 September 2024. On 21 October 2024, the group released the album's fourth single, "Jerkin'". The music video was released through the band's website due to graphic full frontal nudity throughout the video. A censored version was released on YouTube. The band placed in the Triple J Hottest 100 for the first time in 2024, with "Jerkin'" at #32 and "U Should Not Be Doing That" at #34. In 2025, the band opened three concerts for The Offspring in Brazil, while also playing a standalone in São Paulo. From mid-November to mid-December 2025, the band was the main supporting act for AC/DC's Australian leg of the Power Up Tour.

== Members ==
Current members

- Amy Taylor – lead vocals (2016–present)
- Declan Mehrtens – guitars, keyboards, backing vocals (2016–present)
- Bryce Wilson – drums, backing vocals (2016–present)
- Gus Romer – bass, backing vocals (2017–present)

Current touring musicians

- Lakota Vella – bass, backing vocals (2026–present; substitute for Gus Romer)

Former members

- Calum Newton – bass, backing vocals (2016–2017)

== Discography ==
- Amyl and the Sniffers (2019)
- Comfort to Me (2021)
- Cartoon Darkness (2024)

== Awards and nominations ==
=== AIR Awards ===
The Australian Independent Record Awards (known informally as AIR Awards) is an annual awards night to recognise, promote and celebrate the success of Australia's Independent Music sector.

Year	Nominee / work	Award	Result	Ref.
2022	Comfort to Me	Independent Album of the Year	Nominated	
2022	Comfort to Me	Best Independent Punk Album or EP	Won	
2025	Cartoon Darkness	Independent Album of the Year	Won	
2025	Cartoon Darkness	Best Independent Punk Album or EP	Won	
2025	"U Should Not Be Doing That"	Independent Song of the Year	Won	

=== APRA Music Awards ===
The APRA Music Awards were established by Australasian Performing Right Association (APRA) in 1982 to honour the achievements of songwriters and music composers, and to recognise their song writing skills, sales and airplay performance, by its members annually.

Year	Nominee / work	Award	Result	Ref.
2025	"U Should Not Be Doing That" (Declan Mehrtens / Fergus Romer / Amy Taylor / Bryce Wilson)	Song of the Year	Won	
2026	"Jerkin'" (Declan Mehrtens / Amy Taylor / Bryce Wilson)	Song of the Year	Won	
2026	"Jerkin'" (Declan Mehrtens / Amy Taylor / Bryce Wilson)	Most Performed Rock Work	Won	
2026	Amyl and The Sniffers	Songwriter of the Year	Won	

=== ARIA Music Awards ===
The ARIA Music Awards is an annual awards ceremony that recognises excellence, innovation, and achievement across all genres of Australian music.

Year	Nominee / work	Award	Result	Ref.
2019	Amyl and the Sniffers	Best Rock Album	Won	
2019	Amyl and the Sniffers	Best Cover Art	Nominated	
2022	Comfort to Me	Album of the Year	Nominated	
2022	Comfort to Me	Best Group	Won	
2022	Comfort to Me	Best Rock Album	Won	
2022	"Hertz" by Amyl and the Sniffers, John Angus Stewart	Best Video	Nominated	
2022	Comfort to Me Tour 2022	Best Live Act	Nominated	
2022	Amyl and the Sniffers & Dan Luscombe for Amyl and the Sniffers Comfort to Me	Producer – Best Produced Album	Nominated	
2024	John Angus Stewart for Amyl and the Sniffers - "U Should Not Be Doing That"	Best Video	Nominated	
2025	Cartoon Darkness	Album of the Year	Won	
2025	Cartoon Darkness	Best Group	Won	
2025	Cartoon Darkness	Best Rock Album	Won	
2025	John Stewart for Amyl and the Sniffers – "Big Dreams"	Best Video	Nominated	
2025	Cartoon Darkness World Tour	Best Australian Live Act	Nominated	
2025	John Stewart for Amyl and the Sniffers – Cartoon Darkness	Best Cover Art	Won	
2026	Amyl and the Sniffers - Toyota: Nice to Know It Could (The Hero Corporation)	Best Use of an Australian Recording in an Advertisement	Won	

=== Australian Music Prize ===
The Australian Music Prize (the AMP) is an annual award of $30,000 given to an Australian band or solo artist in recognition of the merit of an album released during the year of award. They commenced in 2005.

Year	Nominee / work	Award	Result	Ref.
2019	Amyl and the Sniffers	Australian Music Prize	Nominated	
2021	Comfort to Me	Australian Music Prize	Nominated	
2024	Cartoon Darkness	Australian Music Prize	Nominated	

=== Brit Awards ===
The Brit Awards is a ceremony presented by British Phonographic Industry (BPI) to recognise the best in British and international music.

Year	Nominee / work	Award	Result	Ref.
2025	Amyl and the Sniffers	International Group of the Year	Nominated	

=== Grammy Awards ===
The Grammy Awards are presented by The Recording Academy to recognise outstanding achievement in music. They are regarded by many as the most prestigious and significant awards in the music industry worldwide.

Year	Category	Nominated work	Result	Ref.
2026	Best Rock Performance	"U Should Not Be Doing That"	Nominated	

=== J Awards ===
Commencing in 2005, the J Awards are an annual series of Australian music awards that were established by the Australian Broadcasting Corporation's youth-focused radio station Triple J.

Year	Nominee / work	Award	Result	Ref.
2021	Comfort to Me	Australian Album of the Year	Nominated	
2021	Amyl and the Sniffers	Double J Artist of the Year	Nominated	
2024	Cartoon Darkness	Australian Album of the Year	Nominated	
2024	"U Should Not Be Doing That" (Directed by John Angus Stewart)	Australian Video of the Year	Nominated	
2024	Amyl and the Sniffers	Double J Artist of the Year	Nominated	
2025	Amyl and the Sniffers	Australian Live Act of the Year	Nominated	
2025	Amyl and the Sniffers	Double J Artist of the Year	Won	

=== Music Victoria Awards ===
The Music Victoria Awards, are an annual awards night celebrating music from the Australian state of Victoria. They commenced in 2005.

Year	Nominee / work	Award	Result	Ref.
2017	Amyl and the Sniffers	Best Emerging Act	Nominated	
2018	Amyl and the Sniffers	Best Band	Nominated	
2019	Amyl and the Sniffers	Best Album	Nominated	
2019	Amyl and the Sniffers	Best Rock/Punk Album	Nominated	
2019	Amyl and the Sniffers	Best Band	Nominated	
2019	Amyl and the Sniffers	Best Live Act	Nominated	
2020	Amyl and the Sniffers	Best Band	Won	
2020	Amyl and the Sniffers	Best Live Act	Won	
2020	Amy Taylor (Amyl and the Sniffers)	Best Musician	Won	
2021	Amyl and the Sniffers	Best Live Act	Won	

=== National Live Music Awards ===
The National Live Music Awards (NLMAs) commenced in 2016 to recognise contributions to the live music industry in Australia.

Year	Nominee / work	Award	Result	Ref.
2018	Amyl and the Sniffers	Live Hard Rock Act of the Year	Nominated	
2019	Amyl and the Sniffers	Live Act of the Year	Nominated	
2023	Amyl and the Sniffers	Best Live Act	Won	
2023	Amyl and the Sniffers	Best Punk/Hardcore Act	Won	
2023	Amyl and the Sniffers	Best Live Act in Victoria	Won	

=== Rolling Stone Australia Awards ===
The Rolling Stone Australia Awards are awarded annually in January or February by the Australian edition of Rolling Stone magazine for outstanding contributions to popular culture in the previous year.

Year	Nominee / work	Award	Result	Ref.
2025	Cartoon Darkness	Best LP/EP	Won	
2025	"U Should Not Be Doing That"	Best Single	Shortlisted	
2025	Amyl and the Sniffers	Best Live Act	Won	
2025	Amyl and the Sniffers	Rolling Stone Global Award	Shortlisted	
