= Amy Taylor (musician) =

Australian musician and activist

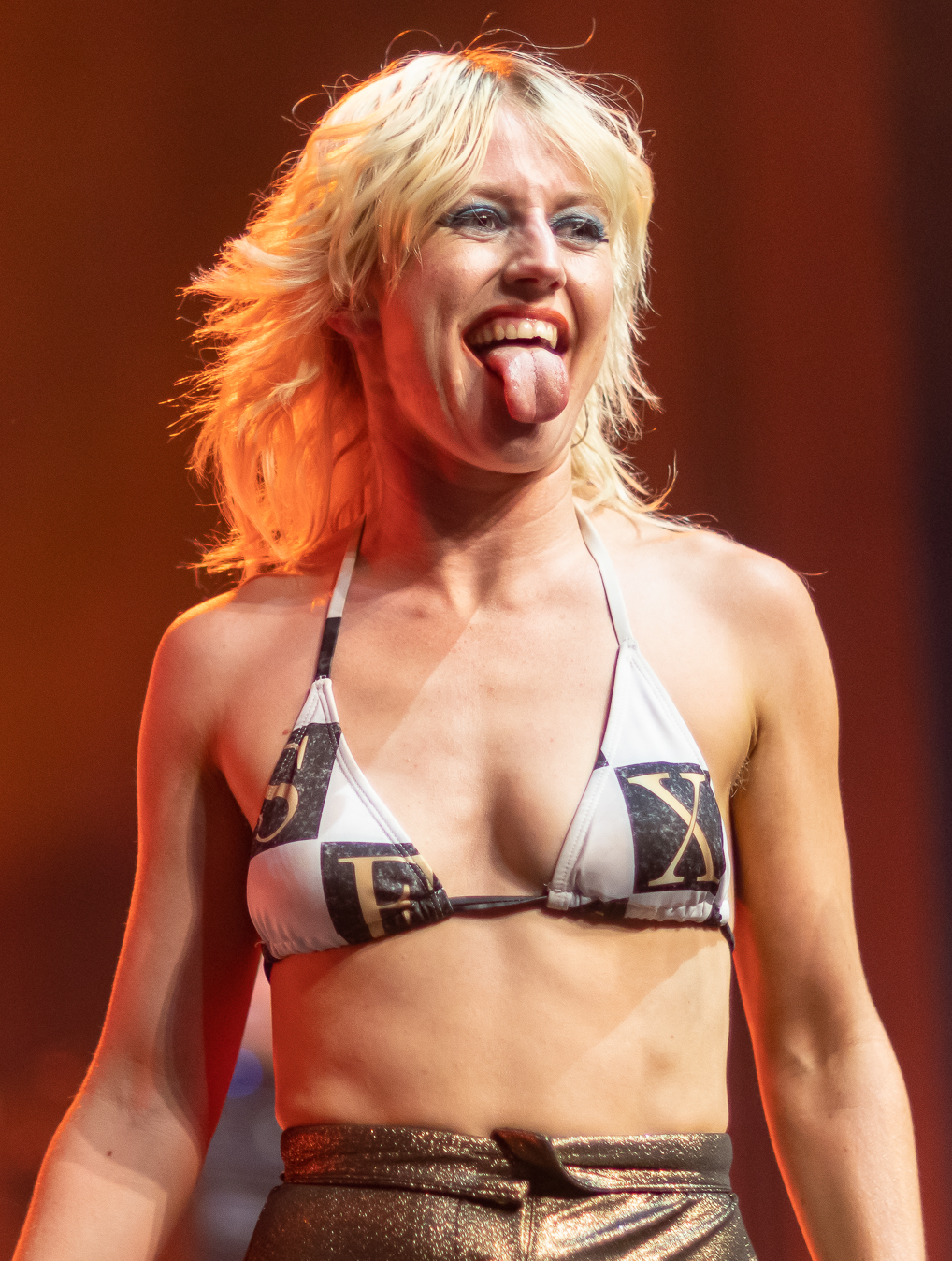
- Taylor performing in 2022

Background information
- Also known as: Amyl
- Born: Amy Louise Taylor; 4 January 1996 (age 30); Mullumbimby, New South Wales, Australia
- Genres: Rock; punk
- Occupations: Singer; musician; songwriter
- Instrument: Vocals
- Years active: 2016–present
- Labels: ATO; Flightless; Rough Trade; Virgin Music Group
- Member of: Amyl and the Sniffers

Amy Louise Taylor (born 4 January 1996) is an Australian musician and activist from Mullumbimby, Australia. She is known as a songwriter and lead vocalist of the ARIA Award-winning Australian pub rock and punk band Amyl and the Sniffers, based in Melbourne, Australia.

== Early life ==
Taylor's mother worked at the post office before studying and practising as a psychologist, and her father was a crane-driver and bottle-shop worker who built their house out of repurposed rocks. Taylor's parents moved to Mullumbimby, "counterculture capital of the country", from Western Sydney in the early 1990s and turned more than a hectare of subdivided farmland into bush. Taylor has one older sister, Grace, and the family lived out of one bedroom divided by curtains until Taylor was nine.

Taylor reminisces about growing up in Mullumbimby in the Amyl and the Sniffers song 'Snakes', on the band's second album Comfort to Me. "Dad was a craney and mum worked and studied, I was swimming in the brunny, I was buckteeth and pale".

Taylor worked full-time at her local IGA supermarket after finishing high school and saved money to move to the outer-western suburb of Laverton, Melbourne, aged 19.

== Music career ==
Taylor completed an apprenticeship at a chemical company, selling gas cylinders for $11 an hour while studying music business at night at TAFE. Taylor went to live music shows almost every week and enjoyed freestyle rapping, meeting her future bandmates at these gigs or in shared houses.

The first songs as Amyl and the Sniffers were written in 2016 and the name was chosen because the first line of Taylor's driver's licence reads “Amy L” and amyl nitrite (also known as poppers) was a drug many of their friends were sniffing at clubs. In 2018, Taylor was able to quit her job working at the “scoop and weigh” fruit and nut section at Coles to go on tour with the band.

In 2018 the band was photographed by Hedi Slimane as part of his collection of black-and-white rock-star portraits (featuring Lady Gaga, Keith Richards, Johnny Rotten and Joan Jett) and Taylor was photographed in what she wore that day – a Big W singlet with a coffee stain on the front. In 2019 Taylor and her bandmates were flown to Sicily to be part of a Gucci campaign and Taylor wore the label on the runway at a Milan Fashion Week show.

In 2022 Taylor and guitarist Declan Mehrtens met the Prime Minister of Australia, Anthony Albanese, to represent the band at a music industry delegation promoting more support for touring in Canberra.

As of early 2025, Taylor is on a world tour with Amyl and the Sniffers (following their ARIA Chart No. 2 album after being knocked down a place by a small margin by Tyler, the Creator's surprise release), and they will be completing their summer shows in Australia in early 2025. Taylor and Mehrtens relocated to Los Angeles in between touring.

== Activism ==
In June 2022 Taylor's performance repeating “F--- the Supreme Court!” went viral at the Glastonbury Festival following news that Roe v Wade had been overturned (the landmark decision protecting national abortion rights for American women) in the Supreme Court of the United States.

In 2021, Taylor wrote the song "Knifey" about the fear and rage that women experience when they feel unsafe walking alone at night.

In January 2022, the band opened for the Sydney Festival, despite the large boycott owing to the festival's financial support from the Israeli government. After hearing about the financial backing, Taylor said the performance was a mistake and that the band donated their festival fee to the Olive Kids foundation, which supports Palestinian children.

In mid-2022, Taylor dedicated a performance of "GFY (Go F--- Yourself)" at the Forum Theatre to Pauline Hanson, days after Hanson launched a campaign to say no to an Indigenous Voice to Parliament.

== Personal life ==
Taylor is friends with Karen O of the Yeah Yeah Yeahs and Arrow De Wilde of Starcrawler.

== Awards ==
=== APRA Music Awards ===
The APRA Music Awards were established by Australasian Performing Right Association (APRA) in 1982 to honour the achievements of songwriters and music composers, and to recognise their song writing skills, sales and airplay performance, by its members annually.

Year	Nominee / work	Award	Result	Ref.
2025	"U Should Not Be Doing That" (Declan Mehrtens, Fergus Romer, Amy Taylor, Bryce Wilson)	Song of the Year	Won	
2026	"Jerkin'" (Declan Mehrtens, Amy Taylor, Bryce Wilson)	Song of the Year	Won	
2026	"Jerkin'" (Declan Mehrtens, Amy Taylor, Bryce Wilson)	Most Performed Rock Work	Won	
2026	Amyl and the Sniffers	Songwriter of the Year	Won	
