= Surf's Up =

Surf's Up may refer to:

== Arts and entertainment ==
=== Music ===
- Surf's Up! At Banzai Pipeline, a 1963 various artists album
- Surf's Up (album), a 1971 album by the Beach Boys
  - "Surf's Up" (song), the album's title track
- "Surf's Up", a song on the 1981 album Bad for Good by Jim Steinman
- "Surf's Up!", a 1995 single by Warren DeMartini
- Surf's Up! (album), a 2001 album by David Thomas and Two Pale Boys
- "Surf's Up", a song on the 2016 album High Visceral (Part One) by Psychedelic Porn Crumpets

=== Literature ===
- Surf's Up, a 2003 book by Jim Toomey

=== Film ===
- Surf's Up (film), a 2007 animated film
  - A sequel, titled Surf's Up 2: WaveMania, was released direct-to-video
  - Surf's Up (video game), a video game based on the 2007 film

== See also ==
- Surfing
- Surf culture
