= Gentleman (Budjerah album) =

Studio album by Budjerah
- Released: 24 July 2026
- Genres: R&B; pop; soul
- Length: 37:33
- Label: Warner Australia
- Producer: Om'Mas Keith

Budjerah chronology
Conversations (2022)	Gentleman (2026)

Singles from Gentleman
- 1. "Want You Back" Released: 19 September 2025; 2. "Gentleman" Released: 20 March 2026; 3. "Could I Be" Released: 22 May 2026; 4. "Even at My Worst" Released: 3 July 2026

Gentleman is the debut studio album by the Australian singer-songwriter Budjerah, released on 24 July 2026 by Warner Music Australia. The album was announced on 18 March 2026, ahead of the official release of its title track and second single.

Upon announcement, Budjerah said, "This album was almost a four-year process for me. Between my life at home and life on the road, I experienced so much change and growth. Chasing my dreams I faced new challenges which helped me understand who I wanted to be. Every song on this album holds a piece of me. I hope little Budjerah is proud." Dan Rosen, president of Warner Music Warner Music Australasia & Southeast Asia, told industry guests, "We're entering the era of the Gentleman [and it] is going to be a defining moment in Australian music. We first met Budjerah six years ago with a voice that stopped the nation, a once in a generation talent."

Upon release, Budjerah said "I wanted this album to represent positive ways that men can be and the positive effects we can have on other people. I think there are positive qualities in a gentleman that everyone can have, like opening doors for someone. Whether you're a gentleman or not, or you believe in chivalry or not, it's always best to lead with kindness and respect".

The album will be supported by the Budjerah Australian Tour 2026, commencing in October 2026.

== Reception ==
Mawunyo Gbogbo from Australian Broadcasting Corporation said "The 11 tracks have a timeless R&B/pop sound."

Tobias Handke from The Note said "Gentleman is a sonically wonderful construction of R&B, soul and modern pop."

Ben Madden from Sydney Morning Herald said "Gentleman is an album that is lush and expansive, painting a full picture of Budjerah’s musical journey." calling it "funky, upbeat and assured."

Australian music journalist Bernard Zuel called it a "classy debut" saying "Essentially, this isn't aimed at the dance-floor or at particularly young buyers, but an audience that likes its music with a bit of flair and a touch of restraint, touched by sensuality rather than overt sexuality, interested but not pushy."

== Track listing ==
Gentleman track listing
No.	Title	Writer(s)	Length
1.	"Gentleman"	Andrae Alexander; Phillip Lawrence; Tierce Person; Autumn Rowe	3:35
2.	"Want You Back"	Michael De Lorenzis; Matthew Frost; Michael Paynter	3:03
3.	"I Only Remember Your Name"	Dave Barker; Ansel Collins; Om'Mas Keith; Poo Bear; Winston Riley; Will Yanez	3:11
4.	"Competition"	Poo Bear; Rob Lewis; Keith	3:00
5.	"Could I Be"	Alexander Burnett; Earl Randle; Willie Mitchell	2:45
6.	"Sinner"	Dennis Princewell Stehr	3:06
7.	"Pretty"	George Harrison; Keith; Harold Lilly	3:16
8.	"Hard Time"	James Morrison; Andy Platts; Conner Reeves	3:25
9.	"Lonely"	DJ Camper; Sebastien Cole; Brandon Hodge; Keith; Yanez	4:30
10.	"Let Me Know"	Venel Jacques; Keith; Lilly	3:55
11.	"Even at My Worst"	Diane Warren	3:47
Total length:			37:33

== Personnel ==
Credits are adapted from Tidal.

- Budjerah – vocals
- Om'Mas Keith – production (tracks 2–11), mixing (2)
- Kizzo – production (1)
- Jonathan Coutrier-Owens – engineering (1)
- Manny Marroquin – mixing (1)
- Bernie Grundman – mastering (1)
- Jack Doutt – mastering (2)
- Simon Cohen – vocal production (1)

== Charts ==
Chart performance for Gentleman
Chart (2026)	Peak position
Australian Albums (ARIA)	14
