= Acid Dad =

American rock band

- Origin: New York City
- Genres: Psychedelic Rock, Alternative Rock
- Years active: 2016-present
- Members: Vaughn Hunt Sean Fahey Trevor Mustoe
- Website: aciddad666.com

Acid Dad is an American rock band from New York City, formed in 2016. The band has released two albums and multiple singles, and has toured alongside bands including Psychedelic Porn Crumpets and Wine Lips. The band started out fully independent, producing their own songs and artwork, and even creating their own guitars and studio space. Their music is characterized as psychedelic alternative rock.

== Discography ==
Albums & EPs
Name	Type	Release Date
Let's Plan a Robbery	EP	February 26, 2016
Acid Dad (Audiotree Live)	EP	May 12, 2016
Acid Dad	Album	March 9, 2018
Take It From The Dead	Album	June 11, 2011

Singles
Name	Release Date	Album
Grim / Brain Body	April 29, 2016	Non-Album Single
Die Hard / Bodies	December 1, 2017	Acid Dad (Die Hard only)
2ci	January 9, 2018	Acid Dad
Living With a Creature	October 26, 2018	Non-Album Single
RC Driver	February 19, 2021	Take It From The Dead
BBQ		Take It From The Dead
Searchin'		Take It From The Dead
Get Me High	September 21, 2022	Non-Album Single
1993	May 19, 2023	Non-Album Single
Real Good Dream	March 19, 2025	Non-Album Single
