= Budjerah (EP) =

- Digital and streaming cover

EP by Budjerah
- Released: 26 March 2021
- Genre: R&B; pop; future soul; gospel
- Length: 12:40
- Label: Warner Music Australia
- Producer: Matt Corby

Budjerah chronology
Budjerah (2021)	Conversations (2022)

Alternative cover
- Budjerah (special edition) cover

Singles from Budjerah
- 1. "Missing You" Released: 28 October 2020; 2. "Higher" Released: 19 February 2021

Budjerah is the debut extended play (EP) by Australian singer-songwriter Budjerah. It was released for digital download and streaming on 26 March 2021 by Warner Music Australia. On 27 August 2021, a special edition of the EP was released on CD, which included the four tracks from Budjerah and four new tracks. Follow its physical release, the EP debuted at number 72 on the ARIA Albums Chart.

At the 2021 ARIA Music Awards, the EP was nominated for Best Soul/R&B Release and Breakthrough Artist - Release. Budjerah was nominated for Best Artist while Matt Corby and Chris Collins received nominations for Producer of the Year and Engineer of the Year for their work on this release.

== Background and release ==
In September 2019, Budjerah uploaded the song "River Dry" onto Triple J Unearthed.

Throughout 2020, Budjerah was mentored by Matt Corby and together, worked on the forthcoming EP Its debut single, "Missing You", was released on 28 October 2020 which Budjerah said "...is really about my love for people. I recently left school to work on music, and I found myself really missing my friends and being around people so much. I don't think this year has really helped these feelings much and I think everyone is really wanting to go out with their friends and see their families as well."

On 19 February 2021, Budjerah released "Higher", which he said "... is about having fun and when you're so happy you don't have any stress or worries, you're just having a good time, kinda like when you go to a party or when you go to see someone special. That's what it feels like."

On 26 March 2021, Budjerah was released. At the same time, Apple Music picked Budjerah as it local "Up Next" artist.

On 14 May 2021, a second EP, Budjerah (Live at Rainbow Valley) was released, containing a live rendition of each of the previous EPs' four tracks, with guest vocalists. The EP was recorded at mentor Matt Corby's titular studio. In a statement, Budjerah said "The original idea for this project was just do a live version of 'Missing You' and have Matt Corby be a feature. But I started to think more on it and I thought 'Why don't we do the whole EP and get a different person to feature on each song?'."

In August 2021, Budjerah was released on CD, featuring four additional tracks not on the original EP. The physical artwork cover was painted by Budjerah's uncle. The EP debuted at number 72 on the ARIA Albums Chart for the week commencing 6 September 2021.

== Critical reception ==
Manning Patston from Happy Mag said: "Surrounded by music and gospel singing from a young age, Budjerah's ear for melody is so accomplished that you'll be left awed and helplessly humbled. The four-tracks from Budjerah showcase his impossibly angelic timbre and vocal dexterity, as well as tasteful piano, spirited percussion and guitar-chops."

Junkee called the EP an "astonishingly good debut" saying "(Matt Corby and Budjerah together have) sculpted an EP that takes influences from gospel, future soul and R&B and pop. Corby's production is light, making room for Budjerah's formidable pipes to come soaring through the instrumentation."

== Track listing ==
Budjerah track listing
No.	Title	Writer(s)	Length
1.	"Missing You"	Matt Corby; Budjerah Slabb	3:28
2.	"Higher"	Corby; Slabb	3:14
3.	"Shoulda Coulda"	Corby; Slabb	2:56
4.	"Pyro"	Corby; Slabb	3:02
Total length:			12:40

Budjerah (Live at Rainbow Valley) track listing
No.	Title	Writer(s)	Length
1.	"Missing You" (featuring Matt Corby)	Corby; Slabb	4:32
2.	"Higher" (featuring Ngaiire)	Corby; Slabb	3:49
3.	"Shoulda Coulda" (featuring Ainslie Wills)	Corby; Slabb	3:03
4.	"Pyro" (featuring Stevan and JK-47)	Corby; Slabb	4:56
Total length:			16:20

Budjerah (Special Edition) CD track listing
No.	Title	Writer(s)	Length
1.	"Because of Her" (live)
2.	"Why" (live)
3.	"A Change Is Gonna Come" (live)	Sam Cooke
4.	"His Eye Is on the Sparrow" (live)	Charles H. Gabriel; Civilla D. Martin
5.	"Missing You"	Corby; Slabb	3:28
6.	"Higher"	Corby; Slabb	3:14
7.	"Shoulda Coulda"	Corby; Slabb	2:56
8.	"Pyro"	Corby; Slabb	3:02
Total length:			12:40

== Personnel ==
Adapted from the EP's liner notes.

- Budjerah Slabb – writing, vocals (1–4)

Other musicians

- Matt Corby – writing, production (1–4)
- Mikaelin "Blue" Bluespruce – mixing (1–4)
- Andrei Eremin – mastering (1–4)

== Charts ==
Chart performance for Budjerah
Chart (2021)	Peak position
Australian Albums (ARIA)	72

== Release history ==
Release history for Budjerah
Region	Date	Version	Format(s)	Label	Ref.
Various	26 March 2021	Budjerah	Digital download; streaming	Warner Music Australia	
Various	14 May 2021	Budjerah (Live at Rainbow Valley)	Digital download; streaming	Warner Music Australia	
Australia	27 August 2021	Budjerah (Special edition)	CD	Warner Music Australia	
