= Goodbye (If You Call That Gone) =

Studio album by May-a
- Released: 20 February 2026
- Length: 34:44
- Label: Sony Australia
- Producers: Chloe Dadd; Carlos de la Garza; Robby De Sá; Chris Greatti; Andrew Wells

May-a chronology
Analysis Paralysis (2023)	Goodbye (If You Call That Gone) (2026)

Singles from Goodbye (If You Call That Gone)
- 1. "[Redacted]" Released: 20 June 2025; 2. "(I'm Here for The) Girls" Released: 31 October 2025; 3. "Claws" Released: 28 November 2025; 4. "Catching Up 2 U" Released: 16 January 2026

Goodbye (If You Call That Gone) is the debut studio album by Australian singer-songwriter May-a. The album was announced alongside its third single "Claws" on 28 November 2025 and was released on 20 February 2026.

Upon announcement May-a said: "I really didn't want this album to get tied down into any specific sound or genre. I think I've kind of avoided that for my whole musical career thus far, because I don't really know where I want to go."

The album was nominated for the 2026 NSW Music Prize.

== Critical reception ==
Lauren McNamara from Rolling Stone Australia said, "[The] long-awaited debut, Goodbye (If You Call That Gone), doesn't arrive with a neat bow. Instead, it shape shifts. Pop dissolves into rock, rage softens into sweetness, and sadness claws its way out from under anger. It's messy, cathartic, and thrillingly alive."

Triple J said "On this record, the Sydney songwriter sounds like she's found herself, with songs that break boundaries and feel good doing it. Balancing the bombastic and the beautiful, it's an album that showcases May-A's vulnerable lyricism and excellent pop instincts."

== Track listing ==
Goodbye (If You Call That Gone) track listing
No.	Title	Writer(s)	Producer(s)	Length
1.	"Catching Up 2 U"	Maya Cumming; Chloe Dadd	Dadd; Carlos de la Garza	3:22
2.	"Claws"	Cumming; Roberto De Sá	Dadd; De Sá; Andrew Wells	2:47
3.	"Taste My Tongue"	Cumming; De Sá	De Sá	2:48
4.	"(I'm Here for The) Girls"	Cumming; Dadd; De Sá	Dadd; De Sá	2:20
5.	"[Redacted]"	Cumming; Dadd	Dadd; De la Garza	2:24
6.	"Slow Burn"	Cumming; Dadd; De Sá	Dadd; De Sá	3:04
7.	"Last Man on Earth"	Cumming; Chris Greatti	Greatti	3:36
8.	"Tide"	Cumming; Dadd	Dadd; De la Garza	3:54
9.	"Am I There"	Cumming; De Sá	De Sa	3:05
10.	"Confessions"	Cumming; Dadd	Dadd; De la Garza	3:45
11.	"On the Way Down"	Cumming; Dadd	Dadd	3:39
Total length:				34:44

== Personnel ==
Credits adapted from Tidal.

- Maya Cumming – vocals
- Chloe Dadd – engineering (tracks 1, 4, 5, 8, 10, 11)
- Carlos de la Garza – engineering (1, 5, 8, 10)
- Ilan Rubin – Drums (tracks 1, 5, 8, 10)
- Jack Robert – Drums (track 11)
- Robby De Sá – engineering (2, 3, 6, 9)
- Chris Greatti – engineering (7)
- Oli Jacobs – mixing
- Ruairi O'Flaherty – mastering

== Charts ==
Chart performance for Goodbye (If You Call That Gone)
Chart (2026)	Peak position
Australian Albums (ARIA)	46

== Release history ==
Release history and formats for Goodbye (If You Call That Gone)
Region	Date	Format	Label	Catalogue
Various	20 February 2026	LP; digital download; streaming	Sony	19958400861
