= Don't Kiss Ur Friends =

EP by May-a
- Released: 6 August 2021
- Length: 21.52
- Label: Arcadia; Sony Music Australia
- Producer: Robby De Sa; Gab Strum

Singles from Don't Kiss Ur Friends
- 1. "Apricots" Released: 6 October 2020; 2. "Time I Love to Waste" Released: 18 February 2021; 3. "Swing of Things" Released: 20 May 2021; 4. "Central Station" Released: 6 August 2021

Don't Kiss Ur Friends is the debut EP by Australian singer-songwriter May-a, released on 6 August 2021 by Arcadia and distributed via Sony Music Australia. The record features seven tracks, including the previously released tracks "Apricots", "Time I Love to Waste" and "Swing of Things", as well as a remixed version of "Swing of Things" featuring Powfu.

The EP was announced on 1 July 2021 and was written by May-a, Robby De Sa, Gab Strum and others. The record was produced by De Sa and Strum.

At the 2021 ARIA Music Awards, the EP was nominated for Breakthrough Artist - Release.

== Track listing ==
Don't Kiss Ur Friends track listing
No.	Title	Writer(s)	Producer(s)	Length
1.	"Amiinmyhead?"	Christian Lo Russo; Madeline Crabtree; May-a; Roberto De Sa	Robby De Sa	3:01
2.	"Swing of Things"	May-a; Gab Strum	Gab Strum	2:58
3.	"Central Station"	Lo Russo; May-a; De Sa	Robby De Sa	3:28
4.	"Daffodils"	May-a; De Sa	Robby De Sa	2:55
5.	"Time I Love to Waste"	Russo; May-a; De Sa	Robby De Sa	3:17
6.	"Apricots"	May-a; De Sa	Robby De Sa	3:12
7.	"Swing of Things" (featuring Powfu)	May-a; StrumIsaiah Faber	Gab Strum	3:12
Total length:				21:52

== Charts ==
Chart performance for Don't Kiss Ur Friends
Chart (2021)	Peak position
Australian Albums (ARIA)	31

== Release history ==
Release history and formats for Don't Kiss Ur Friends
Region	Date	Format	Label	Ref.
Various	6 August 2021	Digital download; streaming	Arcadia/Sony	
Australia	24 September 2021	LP	Sony Music Australia	
