= Brad Cox (musician) =

Australian country musician

- Born: Brad Cox
- Origin: Jindabyne, New South Wales
- Occupations: Singer; songwriter
- Instrument: Vocals
- Years active: 2018–present
- Labels: Tamworth Music Works; Sony Music Australia (2019–2023); Warner Music Australia (2024–present)
- Website: iambradcox.com

Brad Cox (born 1995) is an Australian country singer-songwriter from Jindabyne, New South Wales.

== Early life ==
Brad Cox was born in 1995 as the son of two swimming coaches. He was drawn to the songs he heard on the car stereo during many weekend road-trips to swimming tournaments on the New South Wales south coast. He said that "There was always four cassette tapes in the car, being Joe Cocker, Shania Twain, The Commitments soundtrack and something else. So yeah, I just started singing along in the car."

Cox commenced piano lessons when he was in primary school. He said that he "started playing drums in a high school band and then playing cover gigs at a pub when I was 14 years old". Brad started listening to and writing country music at age 15. He also said that he is influenced by artists who "challenge country music" and the inspiration for his writing coming from personal experiences or from those around him.

== Career ==
=== 2017–2018: Debut album ===
In January 2018, Cox won the Toyota Star Maker award at the Country Music Awards of Australia during the Tamworth Country Music Festival.

In May 2018, Cox released his self-titled debut studio album. The album was proceeded by the singles "Too Drunk to Drive" and "Lake House". At the 2019 CMAA Awards, Cox was nominated for Contemporary Album of the Year and New Talent of the Year.

=== 2019–2021: My Mind's Projection ===
In August 2019, Cox signed with Sony Music Australia. On signing he said that "I've worked so hard on my career over many years from the ground up, and for me it's extremely humbling to know that Sony Music also has the same belief in my music that I do. I'm really excited to be working closely with Denis and the team to take this to the next level locally and internationally."

In November 2020, Cox released My Mind's Projection which featured the singles "Short Lived Love", "Give Me Tonight", "Drinking Season" and the Adam Eckersley collaboration "Remedy". Cox described the album "as a snapshot the last three years of his life.". The album debuted at number 12 on the ARIA Charts.

In May 2021, Cox released the EP What's Your Favourite Country Song?.

=== 2022–2023: Acres ===
On 11 November 2022, Cox announced the forthcoming release of his third studio album, Acres, scheduled for release on 5 May 2023. The album peaked at number 7 on the ARIA charts. At the 2024 Queensland Music Awards, it won Highest Selling Album,

=== 2024: Warner Music Australia and Endemic Intelligence in Multiple Dimensions ===
In September 2024, Cox announced he had signed with Warner Music Australia.

In May 2025, Cox announced his fourth studio album Endemic Intelligence in Multiple Dimensions will be released in September 2025

== Discography ==
=== Albums ===
List of studio albums, with selected chart positions shown
Title	Album details	Peak positions
Title	Album details	AUS
Brad Cox	Released: 4 May 2018; Label: Tamworth Music Works (TMW002); Formats: CD, digital download, streaming	—
My Mind's Projection	Released: 6 November 2020; Label: Sony Music Australia (19439812901); Formats: CD, digital download, streaming, LP	12
Acres	Released: 5 May 2023; Label: Sony Music Australia (19658782832); Formats: CD, digital download, streaming, LP	7
Endemic Intelligence in Multiple Dimensions	Released: 25 September 2025; Label: Warner Music Australia (2173280949); Formats: CD, digital download, streaming, LP	7

=== Live albums ===
List of Live albums, with release date and label shown
Title	Details	Peak positions
Title	Details	AUS
Hot Lettuce Session - Live in Hobart	Released: 22 November 2024; Label: Brad Cox; Formats: digital download, streaming	—

=== Extended plays ===
List of EPs, with release date and label shown
Title	Details	Peak positions
Title	Details	AUS
What's Your Favourite Country Song?	Released: 7 May 2021; Label: Sony Music Australia (19439866782); Formats: CD, digital download, streaming	84

== Awards ==
=== APRA Awards ===
The APRA Awards are held in Australia and New Zealand by the Australasian Performing Right Association to recognise songwriting skills, sales and airplay performance by its members annually.

Year	Nominee / work	Award	Result	Ref.
2021	"Give Me Tonight"	Most Performed Country Song	Nominated	
2022	"Short Lived Love"	Most Performed Country Song	Nominated	
2024	"Last Time Last"	Most Performed Country Work of the Year	Nominated	
2026	"I'm a Boxer" (Brad Cox / Alexander Burnett)	Most Performed Country Work of the Year	Nominated	

=== ARIA Music Awards ===
The ARIA Music Awards is an annual ceremony presented by Australian Recording Industry Association (ARIA), which recognise excellence, innovation, and achievement across all genres of the music of Australia. They commenced in 1987.

Year	Nominee / work	Award	Result	Ref.
2021	My Mind's Projection	Best Country Album	Nominated	
2023	Acres	Best Country Album	Nominated	
2023	Connor Dewhurst for Brad Cox – Acres	Best Cover Art	Nominated	
2023	Acres Tour	Best Australian Live Act	Nominated	

=== Country Music Awards (CMAA) ===
The Country Music Awards of Australia (CMAA) (also known as the Golden Guitar Awards) is an annual awards night held in January during the Tamworth Country Music Festival, celebrating recording excellence in the Australian country music industry. They have been held annually since 1973.

Year	Nominee / work	Award	Result	Ref.
2018	himself	Toyota Star Maker	Won	
2019	Brad Cox	Contemporary Country Album of the Year	Nominated	
2019	Brad Cox	New Talent of the Year	Nominated	
2020	"Rusty Strings" (with Jackson Besley)	Song of the Year	Nominated	
2020	"Rusty Strings" (with Jackson Besley)	Single of the Year	Nominated	
2021	"Remedy" (with Adam Eckersley)	Vocal Collaboration of the Year	Nominated	
2021	"Give Me Tonight"	Song of the Year	Nominated	
2021	"Give Me Tonight"	Single of the Year	Nominated	
2022	Unknown	Unknown	Nominated	
2022	Unknown	Unknown	Nominated	
2024	Brad Cox	Male Artist of the Year	Won	
2024	Acres	Contemporary Country Album of the Year	Won	
2024	Acres	Top Selling Australian Country Album of the Year	Won	
2026	Brad Cox	Male Artist of the Year	Nominated	
2026	Endemic Intelligence in Multiple Dimensions	Contemporary Country Album of the Year	Nominated	
2026	Endemic Intelligence in Multiple Dimensions	Album of the Year	Nominated	
2026	Vocal Collaboration of the Year	"The High Cost of Living" (Brad Cox and Randy Houser)	Nominated	

=== Queensland Music Awards ===
The Queensland Music Awards (previously known as Q Song Awards) are annual awards celebrating Queensland, Australia's brightest emerging artists and established legends. They commenced in 2006.

Year	Nominee / work	Award	Result (wins only)	Ref.
2024	Acres	Highest Selling Album	Won	

=== Rolling Stone Australia Awards ===
The Rolling Stone Australia Awards are awarded annually by the Australian edition of Rolling Stone magazine for outstanding contributions to popular culture in the previous year.

Year	Nominee / work	Award	Result	Ref.
2024	Acres	Best Record	Nominated	
