= Youngn Lipz =

Australian rapper

- Born: Lipo Faaolii; 1999 (age 26–27)
- Origin: Cabramatta, Sydney, Australia
- Genre: Australian hip hop
- Occupations: Rapper; songwriter; musician
- Instruments: Vocals
- Years active: 2019–present
- Label: AreaBabyRecords (independent)

Youngn Lipz (born 1999) is an Australian- Samoan hip-hop musician from Cabramatta, New South Wales.

== Career ==
=== 2019–2021: Career beginnings and Area Baby ===
In September 2019, Bronx rapper A Boogie wit da Hoodie toured Australia before releasing an official remix of his track "Mood Swings", featuring Youngn Lipz alongside two additional Australian rappers.

In October 2019, Youngn Lipz released his debut single "Misunderstood".

At the APRA Music Awards of 2021, "Misunderstood" won Most Performed Hip Hop / Rap Work. In July 2021, Youngn Lipz announced the release of his debut album Area Baby. The album was released on 6 August 2021.

=== 2022: "Go!" ===
On 11 February 2022, Youngn Lipz released "Go!", a song inspired by Calvin Harris and Avicii.

== Discography ==
=== Albums ===
List of albums, with release date and label shown
Title	Details	Peak chart positions	
Title	Details	AUS	NZ
Area Baby	Released: 6 August 2021; Label: AreaBabyRecords (independent); Formats: Digital download, streaming	7	10

=== Extended plays ===
List of EPs, with selected details
Title	Details
Love Songs for the Streets	Released: 15 May 2026; Label: Youngn Lipz

=== Singles ===
==== As lead artist ====
List of singles, with year released, selected chart positions and certifications, and album name shown
Title	Year	Peak chart positions	Certifications	Album
Title	Year	NZ Hot	Certifications	Album
"Misunderstood"	2019	35	ARIA: 2× Platinum	Area Baby
"Silent"	2019	—	ARIA: Gold	Area Baby
"Other Side"	2020	—		Non-album single
"Everyday"	2020	—	ARIA: Gold	Area Baby
"Neverland"	2020	—		Non-album singles
"How?"	2020	—		Non-album singles
"Say It"	2020	—		Area Baby
"Spaceship"	2021	—		Area Baby
"Broken Home"	2021	—		Area Baby
"Misunderstood Pt. 2" (featuring M Huncho)	2021	12		Area Baby
"Go!"	2022	15		TBA
"Pop Out"	2022	14		TBA
"Rolling Loud" (with Hooligan Hefs)	2023	13		TBA
"Amazing"	2023	10		TBA
"Next to Me"	2023	12		TBA
"Celine"	2023			TBA
"Night and Day"	2023	17		TBA
"Magiq"	2024	25		TBA
"Syd"	2025	—		TBA
"Nights Like This"	2025	—		TBA
"2 Shots"	2026	—		Love Songs for the Streets
"Cater to You"	2026	—		Love Songs for the Streets
"Miss Independent"	2026	39		Love Songs for the Streets
"Down Under"	2026			

==== As featured artist ====
List of singles, with year released, selected chart positions, and album name shown
Title	Year	Peak chart positions	Album
Title	Year	NZ Hot	Album
"Mood Swings (remix)" (A Boogie wit da Hoodie featuring Youngn Lipz, Creed Tha Kid & Day1)	2019	—	Non-album singles
"Lifestyle" (DJ Discretion featuring Youngn Lipz and Hooligan Hefs)	2020	—	Non-album singles
"Rover (Remix)" (S1mba featuring Youngn Lipz, Hooks, and Hooligan Hefs)	2020	38	Non-album singles
"Energy" (J.King featuring Youngn Lipz)	2020	—	Non-album singles
"Upgrade" (Ay Huncho featuring Youngn Lipz)	2021	—	Non-album singles
"Nobody Gotta Know" (Open Til L8 featuring Youngn Lipz)	2021	—	Non-album singles

=== Other charted songs ===
List of other charted songs, with year released, selected chart positions, and album name shown
Title	Year	Peak chart positions	Album
Title	Year	NZ Hot	Album
"Area Baby"	2021	17	Area Baby
"Visions"	2021	35	Area Baby

== Awards and nominations ==
=== APRA Awards ===
The APRA Awards are held in Australia and New Zealand by the Australasian Performing Right Association to recognise songwriting skills, sales and airplay performance by its members annually.

Year	Nominee / work	Award	Result	Ref.
2021	"Misunderstood"	Most Performed Hip Hop / Rap Work	Won	
2022	"How?"	Most Performed R&B / Soul Work	Nominated	
2025	"Magiq" (Filipo Faaoloii, Aayan Ahmed)	Most Performed R&B / Soul Work	Nominated	

=== ARIA Music Awards ===
The ARIA Music Awards is an annual ceremony presented by Australian Recording Industry Association (ARIA), which recognise excellence, innovation, and achievement across all genres of the music of Australia. They commenced in 1987.

Year	Nominee / work	Award	Result	Ref.
2021	Area Baby	Best Hip Hop Release	Nominated	
