= Pogo Rodeo =

Studio album by Psychedelic Porn Crumpets
- Released: October 29, 2025
- Length: 42:12
- Label: What Is Reality?

Psychedelic Porn Crumpets chronology
Carpe Diem, Moonman (2025)	Pogo Rodeo (2025)

Pogo Rodeo is the eighth album by Australian psychedelic rock band Psychedelic Porn Crumpets. It was released 29 October 2025 on the record label What Is Reality. It was the band's second album of the year, following Carpe Diem, Moonman.

== Background ==
The album features the use of the Omnichord, as frontman Jack McEwan had broken his arm during recording and struggled to play guitar.

== Critical response ==
Professional ratings
Review scores
Source	Rating
The Needle Drop	7/10
OndaRock	7

Giggens from The Needle Drop gave Pogo Rodeo a 7/10 score, saying "it's a wonderful balanced breakfast of psychedelia, hard rock, garage rock, and experimentation". He noted he preferred it over Carpe Diem, Moonman. In contrast, The Jaily Review felt Carpe Diem was superior. Federico Tranfaglia of OndaRock said the album "doesn't reveal any extraordinary peaks" while still praising it as a consistent standard of modern psychedelic rock. Tinnitist reviewer Darryl Sterdan praised the album, saying "if you're into groundbreaking discoveries, then this is the album for you".

== Track listing ==
No.	Title	Length
1.	"Salsa Verde"	3:24
2.	"Born In the A.D's"	4:33
3.	"Manny's Ready to Roll"	3:41
4.	"The Real Contra Band"	3:09
5.	"Japan"	4:22
6.	"Unconventional Daze"	3:26
7.	"Texas Rangers"	3:41
8.	"Looniversal"	3:01
9.	"Watermelon"	4:09
10.	"Bowling With Tim"	3:53
11.	"Heading to Fringe"	4:47
Total length:		42:12

== Personnel ==
Adapted from Bandcamp.

- Jack McEwan - recording
- Dave Parkin - drums
- Michael Jelinek - mixing
- Ted Jensen - mastering
- Tim Meakins - artwork
