= Shyga! The Sunlight Mound =

Studio album by Psychedelic Porn Crumpets
- Released: 5 February 2021
- Studios: Tone City Studios, Western Australia
- Genre: Psychedelic rock
- Length: 40:39
- Label: What Reality?
- Producer: Psychedelic Porn Crumpets

Psychedelic Porn Crumpets chronology
And Now for the Whatchamacallit (2019)	Shyga! The Sunlight Mound (2021)	Night Gnomes (2022)

Professional ratings
Aggregate scores
Source	Rating
AnyDecentMusic?	7.3/10
Metacritic	80/100
Review scores
Source	Rating
Beats Per Minute	65%
Clash	8/10
Classic Rock	4/5 stars
DIY	3.5/5 stars

Shyga! The Sunlight Mound is the fourth studio album by Australian psychedelic rock band Psychedelic Porn Crumpets. It was released on 5 February 2021 by What Reality? Records and Marathon Artists.

At the 2021 ARIA Music Awards, the album was nominated for Best Hard Rock or Heavy Metal Album.

== Background ==
The majority of the album was written and recorded in lead vocalist Jack McEwan's home due to the COVID-19 pandemic.

== Release ==
The band announced their fourth studio album on 15 October 2020.

=== Singles ===
On 5 August 2020, the band released the first single "Mr. Prism". Of the single, McEwan said: "After our last tour of Europe I had a plethora of reasons to see a doctor. I was pushing through on all sorts of meds until someone offered me an alternative and I realised no matter how sick I’d ever be, I could never turn one down. Mr. Prism (my sickly fun-fuelled fiend of an alter-ego) was born." Psychedelic Porn Crumpets released the official music video on their YouTube on 26 August 2020.

The second single "Tally-Ho" was released on 15 October 2020. The official music video was released on YouTube on 5 November 2020.

The third single "Pukebox" was released on 13 January 2021. It was recorded at McEwan's home studio and Tone City Studios in Western Australia. The official video was put up on YouTube on 1 February 2021.

== Critical reception ==
Shyga! The Sunlight Mound was met with "generally favorable" reviews from critics. At Metacritic, which assigns a weighted average rating out of 100 to reviews from mainstream publications, this release received an average score of 80 based on 8 reviews. AnyDecentMusic? gave the release a 7.3 out of 10 based on a critical consensus of 7 reviews.

In a review for Beats Per Minute, Conor Lochrie explained: "The first half of Shyga! contains most of the sharper hits, while the guitars on the second half are allowed to roam looser and longer. Apart from a few tracks like the interlude "Round The Corner", the guitar riffs dominate. They thrash and fizz and never let up; it can have a bit of an enervating effect after so much." Megan Walder of Clash said: "With the high energy psychedelic haze that metamorphosises around anything this band touch, their exploration of complexities forever surprise. And such stress unites with excitement as we become the very embodiment of an album we have longed for. In fact, it almost didn't matter what SHYGA! The Sunlight Mound contained, as long as it was quintessential Psychedelic Porn Crumpets."

Writing for DIY, Ollie Rankine said: "SHYGA! The Sunlight Mound sets its sights on something larger by dressing up fuzzy, high-intensity pop songs into ambitious prospects of sold-out stadium performances. Whether or not these expectations are realistic, the band seem determined to believe in the hype. As it hurtles uncontrollably down the tracks, the album is an accelerating freight train of insatiable guitar hero pageantry that rarely slows to catch its breath."

== Commercial performance ==
In Australia, Shyga! The Sunlight Mound debuted at number four on the ARIA charts in the week of 15 February 2021. The release also debuted at number two on the ARIA Top 20 Australian Albums Chart.

== Track listing ==
Shyga! The Sunlight Mound track listing
No.	Title	Length
1.	"Big Dijon"	1:06
2.	"Tally-Ho"	3:22
3.	"Sawtooth Monkfish"	2:35
4.	"Tripolasaur"	3:26
5.	"Mr. Prism"	3:54
6.	"The Terrors"	3:52
7.	"Hats Off to the Green Bins"	2:53
8.	"Glitter Bug"	3:31
9.	"More Glitter"	0:35
10.	"Pukebox"	3:09
11.	"Mundungus"	2:44
12.	"Mango Terrarium"	4:25
13.	"Round the Corner"	0:39
14.	"The Tale of Gurney Gridman"	4:29
Total length:		40:39

Japanese edition bonus track
No.	Title	Length
15.	"I Wan'na Be Like You"	2:29
Total length:		43:13

== Personnel ==
Psychedelic Porn Crumpets

- Jack McEwan – vocals (all), guitars (1–8, 10–14), bass (2, 4–8, 10–14), Mellotron (7–9), synthesizer (13)
- Luke Parish – guitar (2, 6, 11), synthesizer (5, 7, 8, 12), drums (10)
- Danny Caddy – drums (2–8, 10–12, 14)
- Chris Young – guitar (11)

Additional musicians

- Ben Caddy – strings (1, 4, 7, 8)
- John Tooby – cello (1)

Production

- Psychedelic Porn Crumpets – production, recording
- Michael Jelinek – co-production, mixing
- Sam Ford – drums recording
- Brian Lucey – mastering
- Sgt_Slaughtermelon – cover artwork
- Carlin DaCheff – inside gatefold artwork

== Charts ==
Chart performance for Shyga! The Sunlight Mound
Chart (2021)	Peak position
Australian Albums (ARIA)	4
