= Acres (album) =

Studio album by Brad Cox
- Released: 5 May 2023
- Studios: Hood Studio B, The Castle Recording Studios, Fireside Studios, Gympie
- Length: 58:10
- Label: Sony Music Australia
- Producers: Brandon Hood, Lindsay Rimes

Brad Cox chronology
| What's Your Favourite Country Song? (2020) | Acres (2023) | Endemic Intelligence in Multiple Dimensions (2025) |

Acres is the third studio album by Australian country musician Brad Cox. It was released on 5 May 2023 and peaked at number 7 on the ARIA Chart.

At the 2023 ARIA Music Awards, the album was nominated for Best Country Album and the Acres Tour for Best Australian Live Act. Connor Dewhurst was nominated for Best Cover Art for his work on this album.

At the 2024 Country Music Awards of Australia, the album won Contemporary Country Album of the Year and Top Selling Australian Country Album of the Year.

At the 2024 Queensland Music Awards, the album won Highest Selling Album. At the 2024 Rolling Stone Australia Awards, the album was nominated for Best Record.

== Reception ==
Robert Moran from Sydney Morning Herald said "Skittering across anthemic FM pop-rock, Whitley-esque bar-soaked romance and Motown-lite groove, it's a confident release showcasing Cox's booming voice, melodic knack and personal worldview, where the road, a committed love and, well, beer can lead to respite and salvation."

Country HQ said, "Acres is more than just an album; its a journey through the heartland of Australia.". They also said "Throughout the album, Cox's songwriting displays a remarkable range and depth. He seamlessly blends traditional country elements with contemporary influences, creating a sound that is both familiar and fresh. The production is top-notch, with the instrumentation complementing Cox's vocals perfectly."

In 2025, Rolling Stone Australia, named the album 43rd best Australian album of the decade so far.

== Track listing ==
1. "Beer and Fishin'" - 2:52
2. "Now She Ain't" - 2:55
3. "One Like You" - 3:11
4. "Maybe" - 2:56
5. "Them Things" - 2:40
6. "Old Time's Sake" - 3:34
7. "Last Time Last" - 3:37
8. "How 'Bout We Don't" - 3:39
9. "Acres" - 3:52
10. "Wildfires" (featuring Ian Moss) - 2:59
11. "What Brought You Back" - 3:08
12. "Memories and Whiskey" - 3:17
13. "Letter Home" - 3:43
14. "Beau in the Back" - 4:06
15. "Old Skoolin'" - 2:41
16. "Single Life" - 3:42
17. "The Storm" - 5:11

== Charts ==
Chart performance for Acres
| Chart (2023) | Peak position |
|---|---|
| Australian Albums (ARIA) | 7 |
