= Higher (Budjerah song) =

2021 single by Budjerah

Single by Budjerah

from the album Budjerah
- Released: 19 February 2021
- Length: 3:14
- Label: Warner Music Australia
- Songwriter(s): Budjerah Slabb; Matt Corby
- Producer(s): Matt Corby

Budjerah singles chronology
"Missing You" (2020)	"Higher" (2021)	"Stranger Love" (2021)

Music video
- "Higher" on YouTube

"Higher" is a song by Australian singer Budjerah, released on 19 February 2021 as the second and final single from his debut self-titled EP.

Budjerah said "It's about having fun and when you're so happy you don't have any stress or worries, you're just having a good time. Kinda like when you go to a party or when you go to see someone special. That's what it feels like."

The music video for "Higher" was directed by Mick Soiza and released on 25 March 2021. At the 2021 ARIA Music Awards, it was nominated for Best Video.

"Higher" was the fourth most played first nations song on Australian radio in 2021.

At the APRA Music Awards of 2022, the song won Most Performed R&B / Soul Work. It was also shortlisted for Song of the Year.

== Critical reception ==
Sose Fuamoli from Triple J said "Built on a bed of acoustic guitar, easy grooves and production, 'Higher' rides a rich R&B wave." Calling Budjerah as "an exciting young voice to watch."
