= No Effect =

Single by Hooligan Hefs
- Released: 21 May 2019
- Genre: Gutter rap
- Length: 3:20
- Label: Hooligan Hefs (independent); The Area Movement
- Songwriter: Simionela Silapa
- Producers: Open Till L8; Mntymvdemusik

Hooligan Hefs singles chronology
"The Party" (2019)	"No Effect" (2019)	"Party Effect" (2019)

Music video
- "No Effect" on YouTube

"No Effect" is a song by Australian hip-hop artist Hooligan Hefs, released independently on 21 May 2019 through Hooligan Hefs and The Area Movement.

"No Effect" was certified platinum in Australia in 2020.

A remix EP was released on 21 January 2020.

== Music video ==
The music video was released on 21 May 2019.

== Track listing ==
1 track single
No.	Title	Length
1.	"No Effect"	3:20

Remixes
No.	Title	Length
1.	"No Effect" (Sunset Bros remix)	3:31
2.	"No Effect" (Zac Samuel remix)	3:12
3.	"No Effect" (Dave Winnel remix)	3:01
4.	"No Effect" (JaySounds remix)	3:30

== Certification ==
Region	Certification	Certified units/sales
Australia (ARIA)	Platinum	70,000^{‡}
^{‡} Sales+streaming figures based on certification alone.
