= Hooligan Hefs =

Indian Samoan Chinese Australian rapper

Jeremy Thornton
- Born: Simeona Silapa; Taree, New South Wales, Australia
- Origin: Doonside, New South Wales, Australia
- Genres: Hip hop; drill; grime; dubstep; EDM; hardstyle; techno
- Occupations: Rapper; songwriter; musician
- Instruments: Vocals; production
- Years active: 2016–present
- Labels: Hooligan Hefs (independent); Warner Music Australia (2020–present)

Simeona Silapa, known professionally as Hooligan Hefs, is an Australian hip-hop and EDM musician from Doonside, New South Wales.

== Career ==
=== 2017–present: Career beginnings ===
Hooligan Hefs appeared as a featured artist on Pistol Pete and Enzo's track "Ten Toes" where he was confirmed to be 4'11 in stature due to lyrics in the song.

In February 2019, Hooligan Hefs released "The Party" and in May 2019, "No Effect", which was certified platinum in Australia in 2020.

In April 2026, Hooligan Hefs announced his debut studio album Sixth Sense will be released in June 2026.

== Discography ==
=== Albums ===
List of albums, with selected details
Title	Details	Peak chart positions
Title	Details	AUS
Sixth Sense	Released: 26 June 2026; Label: New Level; Format: Digital download, streaming	58

=== Extended plays ===
List of EPs, with release date, label, and selected chart positions shown
Title	Details	Peak chart positions	
Title	Details	AUS	NZ
Living in Sin	Released: 21 August 2020; Label: Hooligan Hefs (independent); Formats: Digital download, streaming	9	39
Sinning Winning Living	Released: 6 October 2023; Label: BIORDI Music; Formats: digital download, streaming	— (Note: Sinning Winning Living did not enter the ARIA Top 50 Albums Chart, but peaked at number 8 Australian Artist Chart.)	—

=== Singles ===
==== As lead artist ====
List of singles, with year released, selected chart positions and certifications, and album name shown
Title	Year	Peak chart positions			Certifications	Album
Title	Year	AUS	NZ	NZ Hot	Certifications	Album
"The Party"	2019	—	—	—		Non-album singles
"No Effect"	2019	—	—	—	ARIA: Platinum	Non-album singles
"IYKYK (They Know Who)" (with Hooligan Skinny)	2019	—	—	—		Non-album singles
"Who's Real" (with Masi Rooc)	2019	—	—	—		Non-album singles
"Tell 'Em I'm Doing Eetswa"	2019	—	—	—	ARIA: Gold	Non-album singles
"F.A.M.E" (featuring Hooks, Hooligan Skinny & Masi Rooc)	2020	88	—	17		Non-album singles
"Off Guard"	2020	—	—	—		Non-album singles
"Paper Route"	2020	—	—	17		Non-album singles
"Party With Gang" (featuring Hooligan Skinny)	2020	—	—	—		Living in Sin
"Send It!"	2020	37	—	9	ARIA: 3× Platinum	Non-album singles
"Don't Cross the Line" (with Manu Crooks)	2021	—	—	—		Non-album singles
"Take Off" (with Scndl and Sunset Bros)	2021	— (Note: "Take Off" did not enter the ARIA Top 100 Singles Chart, but peaked at number thirteen on the Top 20 Australian Hip Hop/R&B Singles Chart.)	—	36		Non-album singles
"Hoodstar" (featuring Day1)	2021	—	—	34		Non-album singles
"Handle It"	2022	—	—	—		Non-album singles
"Ruthless" (featuring Celina Sharma)	2023	—	—	24		Non-album singles
"Rolling Loud" (with Youngn Lipz)	2023	—	—	13		Non-album singles
"And We"	2023	58	31	5	ARIA: Gold	Sinning Winning Living
"More Life"	2023	—	—	—		Sinning Winning Living
"Proper" (with NASA Nova and Masi Rooc)	2023	—	—	36		Sinning Winning Living
"Get This Money"	2024	—	—	7	RMNZ: Gold	Non-album single
"Like a Dawg"	2024	—	—	—		Non-album single
"VVS" (with Proper)	2024	—	—	—		Non-album single
"She Will" (featuring Day1)	2025	— (Note: "She Will" did not enter the ARIA Top 100 Singles Chart, but peaked at number three on the Australian Artist Singles Chart.)	—	12		Sixth Sense
"Whistle" (with Savage)	2026	—	—	—		Sixth Sense
"Sixth Sense"	2026	—	—	40		Sixth Sense
"Stuntn"	2026	—	—	—		Sixth Sense
"6pm Somewhere" (with Wiley)	2026	—	—	15		Sixth Sense
"Exclusive" (featuring Youngn Lipz)	2026	—	—	—		Sixth Sense
"Balance"	2026	—	—	22		TBA

==== As featured artist ====
List of singles, with year released, selected chart positions, and album name shown
Title	Year	Peak chart positions	Album
Title	Year	NZ Hot	Album
"Ten Toes" (Piztol Pete and Enzo featuring Hooligan Hefs)	2017	—	Non-album singles
"Party Effect" (Mntymvdemusik featuring Hooligan Hefs)	2019	—	Non-album singles
"Taste (Make It Shake) (Remix)" (Aitch featuring Nerve and Hooligan Hefs)	2019	—	Non-album singles
"Lifestyle" (DJ Discretion featuring Youngn Lipz and Hooligan Hefs)	2020	—	Non-album singles
"Rover (Remix)" (S1mba featuring Youngn Lipz, Hooks, and Hooligan Hefs)	2020	38	Non-album singles
"Riot" (Open Till L8 featuring Hooligan Hefs)	2021	18	Non-album singles
"Magic" (Day1 featuring Hooligan Hefs)	2021	31	Non-album singles
"We Run the Night" (Havana Brown featuring Hooligan Hefs)	2021	—	Non-album singles
"On Me" (Amarni featuring Hooligan Hefs)	2023	—	Non-album singles
"Let It Spray" (Ay Huncho featuring wewantwraiths & Hooligan Hefs)	2023	—	Non-album singles

== Awards and nominations ==
=== APRA Awards ===
The APRA Awards are held in Australia and New Zealand by the Australasian Performing Right Association to recognise songwriting skills, sales and airplay performance by its members annually.

Year	Nominee / work	Award	Result	Ref.
2022	"Send It!"	Most Performed Hip Hop/Rap Work	Nominated	
2024	"And We"	Most Performed Hip Hop/Rap Work	Nominated	
2025	"Get This Money"	Most Performed Hip Hop / Rap Work	Nominated	

=== ARIA Music Awards ===
The ARIA Music Awards is an annual ceremony presented by Australian Recording Industry Association (ARIA), which recognise excellence, innovation, and achievement across all genres of the music of Australia. They commenced in 1987.

Year	Nominee / work	Award	Result	Ref.
2021	"Send It!"	Song of the Year	Nominated	
