= 2021 ARIA Music Awards =

Annual Australian music award

- Date: 24 November 2021
- Venue: Taronga Zoo, Sydney, New South Wales
- Hosted by: Linda Marigliano

Highlights
- Most wins: Genesis Owusu (4)
- Most nominations: The Avalanches (8); Budjerah (8)
- Website: ariaawards.com.au

Television/radio coverage
- Networks
- YouTube; 9Now

The 2021 ARIA Music Awards are the 35th Annual Australian Recording Industry Association Music Awards (generally known as the ARIA Music Awards or simply the ARIAs) and consist of a series of awards, including the 2021 ARIA Artisan Awards, ARIA Fine Arts Awards and the ARIA Awards. The ARIA Awards ceremony occurred on 24 November 2021 in partnership with YouTube Music and streamed live on YouTube, and broadcast via 9Now. The main ceremony was hosted by Linda Marigliano at the Taronga Zoo.

The 2021 ARIA Awards inaugurated a new category, Best Artist, which replaced the categories of Best Female Artist and Best Male Artist. This change is designed to ensure that the ARIA Awards reflect and embrace equality and the true diversity of the music industry in 2021. In making this change the number of nominees for Best Artist were ten. Nominations were announced on ARIA's YouTube channel on 20 October, in a livestream hosted by Brooke Boney. Both the Avalanches and Budjerah had eight nominations, while Genesis Owusu received seven, and Amy Shark had six. Owusu won four categories. No ARIA Hall of Fame inductee was announced. At the split ceremony Boney presented a total of 18 trophies, starting with Music Teacher of the Year on Today in the morning, 16 categories at the Pre-Show (which she hosted at Taronga Zoo), and the inaugural Best Artist at the main ceremony.

== Performers ==
Performers for the ARIA Awards ceremony:

Artist(s)	Song(s)	Ref.
The Kid Laroi	"Stay"	
Amy Shark	"Love Songs Ain't for Us"	
Rüfüs Du Sol	"Alive"	
Genesis Owusu	"Waitin' on Ya", "The Other Black Dog", "Don't Need You"	
Budjerah	"Missing You"	
Gretta Ray	"Love Me Right"	

== Presenters ==
Presenters for the ARIA Awards ceremony:

Artist(s)	Award(s)	Ref.
Brooke Boney	Best Group; Best Rock Album; Best Blues & Roots Album; Best Children's Album; Best Classical Album; Best Country Album; Best Dance Release; Best Jazz Album; Best Adult Contemporary Album; Best Hard Rock/Heavy Metal Album; Best World Music Album; Best Original Soundtrack or Musical Theatre Cast Album; Best Cover Art; Engineer of the Year; Producer of the Year; Best International Artist; Music Teacher of the Year; Best Artist	
Linda Marigliano & Masked Wolf	Best Soul/R&B Release	
Lime Cordiale	Best Independent Release	
Charli XCX	Best Pop Release	
Bryce Mills & Ebony Boadu	Best Hip Hop Release	
Baker Boy & Peach PRC	Best Video	
Troye Sivan	Song of the Year	
Ed Sheeran	Breakthrough Artist	
The Wiggles	Best Live Act	
Vera Blue & Ruel	Album of the Year	

== ARIA Hall of Fame inductee ==
There were no inductees

== Nominees and winners ==
The nominees were announced on 20 October 2021 with winners presented on 24 November 2021.

=== ARIA Awards ===
Winners indicated in boldface, with other nominees in plain.

Full list of nominees
Album of the Year	Best Artist
**Genesis Owusu** – **Smiling with No Teeth**; Amy Shark – Cry Forever; Midnight Oil & First Nations Collaborators – The Makarrata Project; The Avalanches – We Will Always Love You; Tones and I – Welcome to the Madhouse	**The Kid Laroi** & **Justin Bieber** – "**Stay**"; Amy Shark – Cry Forever; Budjerah – Budjerah; Genesis Owusu – Smiling with No Teeth; Keith Urban – The Speed of Now Part 1; Kylie Minogue – Disco; Masked Wolf – "Astronaut in the Ocean"; Ngaiire – 3; Tones and I – Welcome to the Madhouse; Vance Joy – "Missing Piece"
Best Group	Breakthrough Artist
**Rüfüs Du Sol** – "**Alive**"; AC/DC – Power Up; Gang of Youths – "The Angel of 8th Ave."; Midnight Oil – The Makarrata Project; The Avalanches – We Will Always Love You	**Budjerah** – **Budjerah**; Gretta Ray – Begin to Look Around; Masked Wolf – "Astronaut in the Ocean"; May-a – Don't Kiss Ur Friends; Ngaiire – 3
Best Adult Contemporary Album	Best Blues & Roots Album
**Crowded House** – **Dreamers Are Waiting**; Big Scary – Daisy; Kylie Minogue – Disco; Nick Cave & Warren Ellis – Carnage; Odette – Herald	**Archie Roach** – **The Songs of Charcoal Lane**; Emma Donovan & The Pushbacks – Crossover; Josh Teskey & Ash Grunwald – Push the Blues Away; Martha Marlow – Medicine Man; Ziggy Alberts – Searching for Freedom
Best Children's Album	Best Country Album
**Bluey** – **Bluey**; Amber Lawrence – The Kid's Gone Country 2: Fun for All the Family; Diver City – Dance Silly; The Wiggles – Lullabies With Love; Various Artists – The Moon, The Mouse & The Frog: Lullabies from Northern Australia	**Troy Cassar-Daley** – **The World Today**; Brad Cox – My Mind's Projection; Felicity Urquhart & Josh Cunningham – The Song Club; Shane Nicholson – Living in Colour; The Wolfe Brothers – Kids on Cassette
Best Dance Release	Best Hard Rock/Heavy Metal Album
**Rüfüs Du Sol** – "**Alive**"; Cosmo's Midnight – Yesteryear; Dom Dolla – "Pump the Brakes"; Jolyon Petch – "Dreams"; KLP & Stace Cadet – "People Happy"	**Tropical Fuck Storm** – **Deep States**; A. Swayze & the Ghosts – Paid Salvation; Alpha Wolf – A Quiet Place to Die; Psychedelic Porn Crumpets – Shyga! The Sunlight Mound; Yours Truly – Self Care
Best Hip Hop Release	Best Independent Release
**Genesis Owusu** – **Smiling with No Teeth**; B Wise – jamie; Masked Wolf – "Astronaut in the Ocean"; The Kid Laroi – "Without You"; Youngn Lipz – Area Baby	**Genesis Owusu** – **Smiling with No Teeth**; Archie Roach – The Songs of Charcoal Lane; Ball Park Music – Ball Park Music; Emma Donovan & The Pushbacks – Crossover; Vance Joy – "Missing Piece"
Best Pop Release	Best Rock Album
**The Kid Laroi** & **Justin Bieber** – **"Stay"**; Amy Shark – Cry Forever; The Avalanches – We Will Always Love You; Tones and I – "Fly Away"; Vance Joy – "Missing Piece"	**Middle Kids** – **Today We're the Greatest**; AC/DC – Power Up; Ball Park Music – Ball Park Music; Holy Holy – Hello My Beautiful World; Midnight Oil – The Makarrata Project
Best Soul/R&B Release
**Tkay Maidza** – **Last Year Was Weird (Vol. 3)**; Budjerah – Budjerah; Hiatus Kaiyote – Mood Valiant; Jack Britten & Ngaiire – 3; Tash Sultana – Terra Firma

=== Public voted ===
Winners indicated in boldface, with other nominees in plain.

Song of the Year	Best Video
**Spacey Jane** – "**Booster Seat**"; Amy Shark feat. Keith Urban – "Love Songs Ain't for Us"; Dean Lewis – "Falling Up"; Hooligan Hefs – "Send It!"; Keith Urban & Pink – "One Too Many"; Masked Wolf – "Astronaut in the Ocean"; Sam Fischer & Demi Lovato – "What Other People Say"; The Kid Laroi with Miley Cyrus – "Without You"; Tones and I – "Fly Away"; Vance Joy – "Missing Piece"	**Annelise Hickey** for **Vance Joy** – "**Missing Piece**"; Nicholas Muecke for Tkay Maidza – "24k"; Daniele Cernera for Masked Wolf – "Astronaut in the Ocean"; Troye Sivan & Jesse Gohier-Fleet for Troye Sivan – "Could Cry Just Thinkin About You"; Jesse Hill for Julia Stone – "Dance"; Robert Hambling for Midnight Oil – "First Nation"; Mike Soiza for Budjerah – "Higher"; James Chappell for Amy Shark – "Love Songs Ain't for Us"; Johnathan Zawada for The Avalanches – "The Devine Chord"; Nick Kozakis, Liam Kelly, Tones and I for Tones and I – "Won't Sleep"
Best Australian Live Act	Best International Artist
**Lime Cordiale** – **Relapse Tour**; Amy Shark – Cry Forever Tour 2021; Ball Park Music – Ball Park Music - The Residency; Budjerah – Budjerah 2021 Aus Tour; Genesis Owusu – Smiling With No Teeth Album Tour; King Gizzard & the Lizard Wizard – Micro Tour; Midnight Oil – Makarrata Live; The Avalanches – The Avalanches Live; The Teskey Brothers – The Teskey Brothers (Headline Shows + Festivals); Thelma Plum – Homecoming Queen Tour	**Taylor Swift** – **Evermore**; Ariana Grande – Positions; Doja Cat – Planet Her; Justin Bieber – Justice; Kanye West – Donda; Luke Combs – What You See Ain't Always What You Get; Machine Gun Kelly – Tickets to My Downfall; Miley Cyrus – Plastic Hearts; Olivia Rodrigo – Sour; Pop Smoke – Shoot for the Stars, Aim for the Moon
Music Teacher of the Year
**Zoë Barry (Sacred Heart School, Melbourne VIC)**; Ashley Baxter (Pimlico State High School, Townsville QLD); Aaron Silver (Wodonga Primary School, Regional VIC); Daniel Wilson (Star Struck, Newcastle NSW)

=== Fine Arts Awards ===
Winners indicated in boldface, with other nominees in plain.

Best Classical Album
- **Genevieve Lacey** & **Marshall McGuire** – **Bower**
  - Christian Li – Vivaldi: The Four Seasons
  - Emily Sun & Andrea Lam – Nocturnes
  - Grigoryan Brothers – This Is Us (A Musical Reflection of Australia)
  - Nat Bartsch – Hope
Best Jazz Album
- **Mildlife** – **Automatic**
  - Australian Art Orchestra, Reuben Lewis, Tariro Mavondo & Peter Knight – Closed Beginnings
  - Kristen Beradi, Sean Foran & Rafael Karlen – Haven
  - Petra Haden and the Nick Haywood Quintet – Songs from my Father
  - Vazesh – The Sacred Key
Best World Music Album
- **Joseph Tawadros** – **Hope in an Empty City**
  - Bob Weatherall & Halfway, with William Barton – Restless Dream
  - Bukhchuluun Ganburged – The Journey
  - Eishan Ensemble – Project Masnavi
  - Kuya James – ISA
Best Original Soundtrack or Musical Theatre Cast Album
- **Angus & Julia Stone** – **Life Is Strange**
  - Antony Partos – Rams (Original Motion Picture Score)
  - Caitlin Yeo, Maria Alfonsine, Damian de Boos-Smith – Wakefield (Season One Official Soundtrack)
  - Sia – Music – Songs from and Inspired by the Motion Picture
  - Yve Blake – Fangirls

=== Artisan Awards ===
Winners indicated in boldface, with other nominees in plain.

Producer of the Year
- **Konstantin Kersting** and **The Rubens** for **The Rubens** – **0202** and "**Masterpiece**"
  - Andrew Klippel, Dave Hammer for Genesis Owusu – Smiling with No Teeth
  - M-Phazes for Amy Shark – Cry Forever, Illy – The Space Between and Guy Sebastian – T.R.U.T.H.
  - Matt Corby for Budjerah – Budjerah
  - Robert Chater for The Avalanches – We Will Always Love You
Engineer of the Year
- **Konstantin Kersting** for **The Jungle Giants** – **Love Signs**, **The Rubens** – **0202** and "**Masterpiece**"
  - Chris Collins for Budjerah – Budjerah, Skegss – Rehearsal and Tyne-James Organ – Necessary Evil
  - Eric J Dubowsky for The Rubens – 0202
  - Matt Corby for Budjerah – Budjerah
  - Tony Espie for Kate Miller-Heidke – Child in Reverse and The Avalanches – We Will Always Love You
Best Cover Art
- **Kofi Ansah** & **Bailey Howard** for **Genesis Owusu** – **Smiling with No Teeth**
  - Ngaiire Joseph & Dan Segal for Ngaiire – 3
  - Eben Ejdne for Odette – Herald
  - Jonathan Zawada for The Avalanches – We Will Always Love You
  - Giulia Giannini McGauran & Mitchell Eaton for Tones and I – Welcome to the Madhouse
