= Budjerah =

Australian pop musician

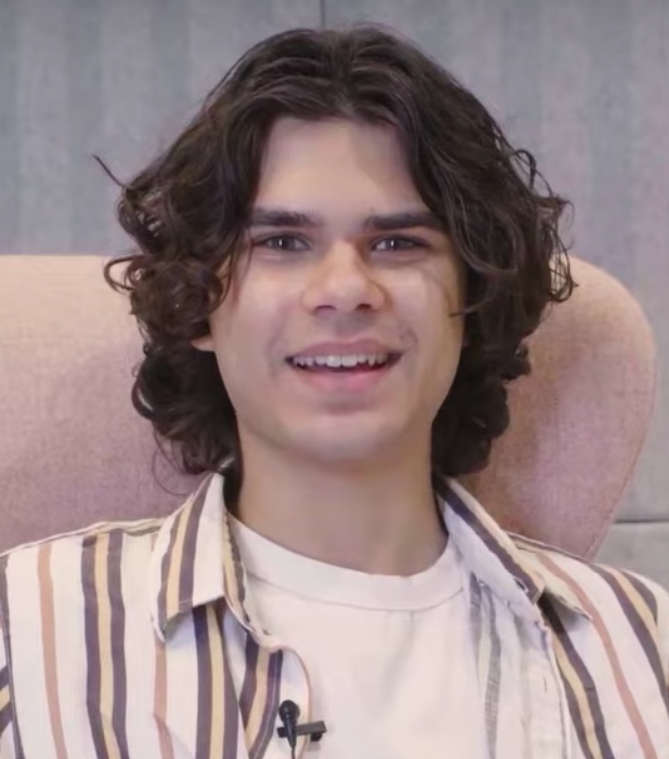
- Budjerah in 2022

Background information
- Born: Budjerah Julum Slabb; 17 March 2002 (age 24); Fingal Head, New South Wales, Australia
- Genre: Pop
- Occupations: Singer; songwriter; musician
- Instruments: Vocals; piano; guitar
- Years active: 2019–present
- Label: Warner Australia
- Spouse: Sophie Moore (m. 2026)
- Website: budjerah.com

Budjerah Julum Slabb (/ˈbʊdʒəˌrʌ/ BUUJ-ə-ruh; born 17 March 2002), known mononymously as Budjerah, is an Australian singer from Fingal Head, New South Wales. He is an Indigenous Australian Coodjinburra man from the Bundjalung nation.

His debut single "Missing You" was released in October 2020. Budjerah performed the track live for Australian live music program The Sound on 6 December 2020. After winning the Michael Gudinski Breakthrough Artist award at the 2021 ARIA Awards, Budjerah went on to release his debut EP Conversations in April 2022 and launched his first-ever global tour.

In 2023, Budjerah won the Artist of the Year award at the National Indigenous Music Awards. His debut studio album Gentleman was released on 24 July 2026.

== Early life ==
Budjerah Julum Slabb was born on 17 March 2002 in Fingal Head, located 5 kilometres south of the Queensland–New South Wales border in the Gold Coast–Tweed region. His parents are licensed pastors and he subsequently grew up singing gospel music in churches throughout his upbringing. Budjerah said "I grew up singing Sam Cooke and listening to gospel singers like The Clark Sisters. That's the kind of music that has been around since I was little." Along with performing in churches, Budjerah would regularly perform in venues on the Gold Coast such as Carrara Stadium in front of more than 18,000 people during a Gold Coast Suns' home game.

== Career ==
=== 2019–2021: Debut EP ===
In 2019, Budjerah auditioned for The Voice (Australian season 8), singing "Climb Every Mountain" but did not progress past the blind auditions. He uploaded the song "River Dry" onto Triple J Unearthed later that year. In 2020, Budjerah found kinship with fellow Australian singer-songwriter Matt Corby, who produced his debut EP.

Budjerah released his debut single "Missing You" in October 2020, which topped the Triple J airplay chart. Hayden Davies from Pilerats described the single as "a spectacular introductory moment for Budjerah that combines pockets of his life with the music that defined it, bringing together a tapestry of long-time influences spread through soul, hip-hop, R&B, indie and pop only to distil it into a sound that seemingly moves between all of them, capturing the multi-faceted musical brain of someone whose moment has been a long time coming."

In March 2021, Apple Music announced Budjerah as its latest local Up Next artist, an initiative to identify and showcase rising talent from across Australia and New Zealand.

His self-titled debut EP was released on 26 March 2021, with a Live version titled Budjerah (Live At Rainbow Valley) following up two months later. In addition to Corby, fellow artists Ngaiire, Ainslie Wills, JK-47 and Stevan featured on the new EP. In August 2021, a limited edition CD of the self-titled EP was released. At the 2021 ARIA Music Awards, Budjerah won the Award for Breakthrough Artist – Release.

On 26 November Budjerah released the single "Wash My Sorrows Away".

=== 2022–2025: Conversations ===
On 25 February 2022, Budjerah announced the release date of his forthcoming EP Conversations as 8 April 2022 alongside his debut world tour. His single "Ready for the Sky" was released in July and has been dubbed "irresistibly smooth" and "a warm slice of soul" that showcases "Budjerah's immersive vocal and lyrical skills." He was invited to perform at the AFL Grand Final in September 2022.

Budjerah supported Ed Sheeran on his 2023 Australian tour. In February of that year, he released "Therapy", a track born out of his experiences with therapy and "Video Game", a song co-written by Meg Mac, Matt Corby and Chris Collins.

Many songs that Budjerah co-wrote with Corby for his debut album were later scrapped. In 2026, Budjerah explained that "It never came out because we just didn't get the time to develop it... I was in the studio and was showing up late or popping out because I had to do interviews. I didn't really get to sit in one place and develop it."

In June 2023, Budjerah released a cover of Crowded House's "Better Be Home Soon" with WILSN, as part of Mushroom Records' 50th anniversary celebration.

On 9 January 2025, Budjerah played his first show for the year at AJ2025 (Australian Scout Jamborees) featuring songs like "Stranger Love" and "2 Step" as well as covers such as "Valarie" and "Proud Mary", closing the performance with "Therapy".

=== 2026: Gentleman ===
In March 2026, Budjerah announced his next studio album, Gentleman, which was released on 24 July 2026.

== Personal life ==
Slabb began a relationship with Sophie née Moore in high school. On 22 April 2026, he proposed to Moore in Sydney following a Chaka Khan concert at the Sydney Opera House. The pair married on 4 June at Pioneer Country, Tweed Heads South.

== Discography ==
=== Studio albums ===
List of studio albums, with release date and label shown
Title	Album details	Peak chart positions
Title	Album details	AUS
Gentleman	Released: 24 July 2026; Label: Warner Music Australia; Formats: CD, digital download, streaming	14

=== Extended plays ===
List of EPs, with release date and label shown
Title	EP details	Peak chart positions
Title	EP details	AUS
Budjerah	Released: 26 March 2021; Label: Warner Music Australia; Formats: CD, digital download, streaming	72
Budjerah (Live at Rainbow Valley)	Released: 14 May 2021; Label: Warner Music Australia; Formats: Digital download, streaming	72
Conversations	Released: 8 April 2022; Label: Warner Music Australia; Formats: Digital download, streaming	97

=== Singles ===
==== As lead artist ====
List of singles, with year released, selected chart positions, and album name shown
Year	Title	Peak chart positions	Certification	Album
Year	Title	NZ Hot	Certification	Album
"Missing You"	2020	—		Budjerah
"Higher"	2021	—		Budjerah
"Stranger Love" (with Pnau)	2021	34		Non-album single
"Talk" (with May-a)	2021	—		Conversations
"Wash My Sorrows Away"	2021	—		Conversations
"What Should I Do?"	2022	—		Conversations
"Get Down"	2022	—		Conversations
"Ready for the Sky"	2022	—		Non-album singles
"Sweet Disposition" (with Ngaiire and Gretta Ray)	2022	—		Non-album singles
"Who Would Imagine a King"	2022	—		Non-album singles
"Therapy"	2023	—	ARIA: Platinum	Non-album singles
"Video Game"	2023	—		Non-album singles
"Is It Ever Gonna Make Sense"	2024	—		Non-album singles
"Want You Back"	2025	—		Gentleman
"Gentleman"	2026	—		Gentleman
"Could I Be"	2026	—		Gentleman
"Even At My Worst"	2026	—		Gentleman
"—" denotes a recording that did not chart or was not released.

==== As featured artist ====
List of singles, with year released and album name shown
Year	Title	Album
2023	"Heavy Love" (KYE featuring Budjerah)	Ribena

=== Other appearances ===
List of other non-single song appearances
Title	Year	Album
"The Way" (with Matt Corby)	2023	Faraway Downs (Soundtrack)
"Better Be Home Soon" (with WILSN)	2023	Mushroom: Fifty Years of Making Noise (Reimagined)

=== Music videos ===
List of music videos, with title, year released, and director(s) shown
Year	Title	Director(s)	Ref.
2020	"Missing You"	Mos & Co	
2021	"Higher"	Mick Soiza	
2021	"Stranger Love" (with PNAU)	Tyler Hinde	
2021	"Talk" (with May-a)	Bourtney Crookes	
2022	"What Should I Do?"	Mick Soiza	
2022	"Get Down"	Tatjana Hamilton	
2022	"Ready for the Sky" (Live at Bakehouse Studios)	Michael Ridley	
2023	"Therapy"	Murli Dhir	
2023	"Video Game"		
2023	"Heavy Love" (KYE featuring Budjerah)		
2023	"Christmas (Baby Please Come Home)" (featuring Amazon Playmakers)		
2024	"Is It Ever Gonna Make Sense"		
2025	"Want You Back"		
2026	"Gentleman"		

== Awards and nominations ==
=== AIR Awards ===
The Australian Independent Record Awards (commonly known informally as AIR Awards) is an annual awards night to recognise, promote and celebrate the success of Australia's Independent Music sector.

Year	Nominee / work	Award	Result	Ref.
2022	"Stranger Love" (with PNAU)	Best Independent Dance, Electronica or Club Single	Nominated	

=== APRA Awards ===
The APRA Awards are held in Australia and New Zealand by the Australasian Performing Right Association to recognise songwriting skills, sales and airplay performance by its members annually.

Year	Nominee / work	Award	Result	Ref.
2022	Budjerah Slabb	Breakthrough Songwriter of the Year	Nominated	
2022	"Higher" (Budjerah Slabb, Matt Corby)	Most Performed R&B/Soul Work of the Year	Won	
2022	"Higher" (Budjerah Slabb, Matt Corby)	Song of the Year	Shortlisted	
2023	"Ready for the Sky" (Budjerah, Ainslie Wills)	Song of the Year	Shortlisted	
2023	Budjerah Slabb	Breakthrough Songwriter of the Year	Nominated	
2024	"Therapy" (Sarah Aarons, Ajay Bhattacharyya)	Song of the Year	Nominated	
2024	"Therapy" (Sarah Aarons, Ajay Bhattacharyya)	Most Performed Australian Work	Nominated	
2024	"Ready for the Sky" (Budjerah, Ainslie Wills)	Most Performed Australian Work	Nominated	
2024	"Ready for the Sky" (Budjerah, Ainslie Wills)	Most Performed Pop Work	Nominated	
2024	"Therapy" (Sarah Aarons, Ajay Bhattacharyya)	Most Performed Pop Work	Nominated	

=== ARIA Music Awards ===
The ARIA Music Awards is an annual ceremony presented by Australian Recording Industry Association (ARIA), which recognise excellence, innovation, and achievement across all genres of the music of Australia. They commenced in 1987.

Year	Nominee / work	Award	Result	Ref.
2021	Budjerah	Best Artist	Nominated	
2021	Budjerah	Breakthrough Artist	Won	
2021	Budjerah	Best Soul/R&B Release	Nominated	
2021	Mike Soiza for Budjerah – "Higher"	Best Video	Nominated	
2021	Budjerah 2021 Aus Tour	Best Australian Live Act	Nominated	
2021	Matt Corby for Budjerah – Budjerah (EP)	Producer of the Year	Nominated	
2021	Matt Corby for Budjerah – Budjerah (EP)	Engineer of the Year	Nominated	
2021	Chris Collins for Budjerah – Budjerah (EP)	Engineer of the Year	Nominated	
2022	Conversations	Best Solo Artist	Nominated	
2022	Conversations	Best Soul/R&B Release	Won	
2022	The Conversations Australian Tour	Best Australian Live Act	Nominated	
2022	Dann Hume & Eric J Dubowsky for Budjerah – Conversations	Mix Engineer – Best Mixed Album	Nominated	
2023	"2step" by Ed Sheeran (featuring Budjerah)	Best Solo Artist	Nominated	
2023	"Therapy"	Best Pop Release	Nominated	
2023	"Therapy"	Song of the Year	Nominated	
2023	Murli Dhir and Made In Katana Studios for Budjerah – "Therapy"	Best Video	Nominated	
2023	Budjerah Australian Tour	Best Australian Live Act	Nominated	
2024	"Is It Ever Gonna Make Sense"	Best Video	Nominated	

=== National Indigenous Music Awards ===
The National Indigenous Music Awards recognise excellence, innovation and leadership among Aboriginal and Torres Strait Islander musicians from throughout Australia. They commenced in 2004.

Year	Nominee / work	Award	Result	Ref.
2021	Himself	New Artist of the Year	Won	
2023	Himself	Artist of the Year	Won	
2023	"Therapy"	Song of the Year	Nominated	
2023	"Therapy"	Film Clip of the Year	Nominated	
2024	Himself	Artist of the Year	Nominated	
2024	"Video Game"	Song of the Year	Nominated	

=== National Live Music Awards ===
The National Live Music Awards (NLMAs) commenced in 2016 to recognise contributions to the live music industry in Australia.

Year	Nominee / work	Award	Result	Ref.
2023	Budjerah	Best R&B or Soul Act	Nominated	
2023	Budjerah	Best Live Voice in NSW	Nominated	

=== Rolling Stone Australia Awards ===
The Rolling Stone Australia Awards are awarded annually in January or February by the Australian edition of Rolling Stone magazine for outstanding contributions to popular culture in the previous year.

Year	Nominee / work	Award	Result	Ref.
2023	"Ready for the Sky"	Best Single	Nominated	
2023	Budjerah	Best New Artist	Won	
2024	"Therapy"	Best Single	Nominated	

=== Vanda & Young Global Songwriting Competition ===
The Vanda & Young Global Songwriting Competition is an annual competition that "acknowledges great songwriting whilst supporting and raising money for Nordoff-Robbins" and is coordinated by Albert Music and APRA AMCOS. It commenced in 2009.

Year	Nominee / work	Award	Result	Ref.
2022	"Ready for the Sky"	Vanda & Young Global Songwriting Competition	2nd	
