= Misunderstood (Youngn Lipz song) =

Single by Youngn Lipz

from the album Area Baby
- Released: 19 October 2019
- Length: 2:29
- Label: Biordi Music
- Songwriter(s): Filipo Faaoloii

Youngn Lipz singles chronology
"Misunderstood" (2019)	"Silent" (2019)

Music video
- "Misunderstood" on YouTube

"Misunderstood" is the debut single by Australian hip-hop musician Youngn Lipz, released independently though Biordi Music on 19 October 2019. The single was certified platinum in Australia in 2021.

At the APRA Music Awards of 2021, the song won Most Performed Hip Hop / Rap Work.

== Music video ==
The music video was directed by Aman Sharma and filmed in Cabramatta in Sydney's south west.

== Charts ==
Chart performance for "Misunderstood"
Chart (2019–2022)	Peak position
Australian Artist Singles (ARIA)	16
Australian Hip Hop/R&B Singles (ARIA)	20
New Zealand Hot Singles (RMNZ)	35

== Certifications ==
Region	Certification	Certified units/sales
Australia (ARIA)	2× Platinum	140,000^{‡}
^{‡} Sales+streaming figures based on certification alone.
