= Fronzoli =

Studio album by Psychedelic Porn Crumpets
- Released: 10 November 2023
- Length: 33:35
- Label: What Reality?

Psychedelic Porn Crumpets chronology
Night Gnomes (2022)	Fronzoli (2023)	Carpe Diem, Moonman (2025)

Professional ratings
Review scores
Source	Rating
DIY	3.5/5 stars
Spill	2.5/5 stars

Fronzoli is the sixth studio album by Australian psychedelic rock band Psychedelic Porn Crumpets. It was released on 10 November 2023 by What Reality? Records.

The album reached number 72 on the ARIA charts in Australia.

== Track listing ==
Fronzoli track listing
No.	Title	Length
1.	"Nootmare"	3:32
2.	"(I'm a Kadaver) Alakazam"	3:48
3.	"Dilemma Us From Evil"	3:02
4.	"Cpt. Gravity Mouse Welcome"	3:18
5.	"All Aboard the S.S. Sinker"	3:13
6.	"Hot! Heat! Wow! Hot!"	3:32
7.	"Sierra Nevada"	3:37
8.	"Illusions of Grandeur"	1:46
9.	"Pillhouse (Papa Moonshine)"	4:28
10.	"Mr & Mrs Misanthrope"	3:15

== Charts ==
Chart performance for Fronzoli
Chart (2023)	Peak position
Australian Albums (ARIA)	72
Scottish Albums (Official Charts)	72
UK Independent Albums (Official Charts)	21
UK Progressive Albums (Official Charts)	7
UK Vinyl Albums (Official Charts Company)	24
