= APRA Music Awards of 2024 =

Australian music award ceremony

- Date: 1 May 2024
- Location: International Convention Centre Sydney, Australia
- Hosted by: Tom Gleeson

Highlights
- Most wins: Dean Lewis (2)
- Most nominations: Budjerah (5)
- Website: apraamcos.com.au/awards/

The APRA Music Awards of 2024 were the 42nd annual series, known as the APRA Awards. The awards are given in a series of categories in three divisions and in separate ceremonies throughout the year: the APRA Music Awards, Art Music Awards and Screen Music Awards.

The APRA Music Awards took place on 1 May 2024. The 25 songs shortlisted for Song of the Year were announced on 22 February 2024. Nominations were announced on 4 April 2024.

== APRA Music Awards ==
=== Ted Albert Award for Outstanding Services to Australian Music ===
- Bart Willoughby

=== APRA Song of the Year ===
Title and/or artist	Writer(s)	Publisher(s)	Result	Ref.
"If Not Now" by Paul Kelly	Paul Kelly, David McComb	Sony Music Publishing / Mushroom Music	Nominated	
"Letting Go" by Angie McMahon	Angie McMahon	Kobalt Music Publishing	Nominated	
"Rush" by Troye Sivan	Troye Sivan, Kaelyn Behr p.k.a. Styalz Fuego, Alex Chapman, Kevin Hickey, Brett McLaughlin, Adam Novodor	Universal/MCA Music Publishing / Universal Music Publishing /Kobalt Music Publishing / Sony Music Publishing	Won	
"Therapy" by Budjerah	Sarah Aarons, Ajay Bhattacharyya	Sony Music Publishing	Nominated	
"The Worst Person Alive" by G Flip	Georgia Flipo, Aidan Hogg, Charles Brand, Michelle Buzz	Kobalt Music Publishing / Downtown Music / Warner Chappell Music	Nominated	

=== Songwriter of the Year ===
Writer(s)	Result	Ref.
The Teskey Brothers (Josh Teskey, Sam Teskey)	Won	

=== Emerging Songwriter of the Year ===
Writer(s)	Publisher(s)	Result	Ref.
Beckah Amani	—N/a	Nominated	
Grentperez	Mushroom Music	Won	
May-a	Sony Music Publishing	Nominated	
Otis Pavlovic & Royel Maddell (Royel Otis)	Kobalt Music Publishing o.b.o. Ourness Songs	Nominated	
Scarlett McKahey, Anna Ryan, Jaida Stephenson and Neve van Boxsel (Teen Jesus and the Jean Teasers)	Warner Chappell Music	Nominated	

=== Most Performed Australian Work ===
Title and/or artist	Writer(s)	Publisher(s)	Result	Ref.
"How Do I Say Goodbye" by Dean Lewis	Dean Lewis, Jon Hume	Kobalt Music Publishing / Concord ANZ	Won	
"Only Wanna Be With You" by Amy Shark	Amy Billings p.k.a. Amy Shark, Grant Averill, Joseph Spargur	Mushroom Music	Nominated	
"Love Again" by The Kid LAROI	Charlton Howard p.k.a. The Kid Laroi, Omer Fedi, Billy Walsh, Henry Walter	Sony Music Publishing / Universal/MCA Music Publishing	Nominated	
"Ready for the Sky" by Budjerah	Budjerah, Ainslie Wills	Mushroom Music / Sony Music Publishing	Nominated	
"Therapy" by Budjerah	Sarah Aarons, Ajay Bhattacharyya	Sony Music Publishing	Nominated	

=== Most Performed Australian Work Overseas ===
Title	Writer(s)	Result	Ref.
"Unstoppable" by Sia	Sia Furler, Christopher Braide	Won	

=== Most Performed Alternative Work ===
Title and/or artist	Writer(s)	Publisher(s)	Result	Ref.
"Colin" by Lime Cordiale	Louis Leimbach, Oli Leimbach	Universal Music Publishing o.b.o. Chugg Music	Nominated	
"Daylight" by Birds of Tokyo	Ian Berney, Ian Kenny, Glenn Sarangapan, Adam Spark, Adam Weston	Mushroom Music	Won	
"Everybody's Saying Thursday's the Weekend" by DMA's	Matthew Mason, Thomas O'Dell, John Took, Liam Hoskins	Universal Music Publishing / Warner Chappell Music	Nominated	
"Miami Baby" by Dope Lemon	Angus Stone p.k.a. Dope Lemon, Elliott Hammond	Sony Music Publishing / BMG	Nominated	
"Sweat You Out My System" by May-a	Maya Cumming p.k.a. May-a, Robby De Sá	Sony Music Publishing	Nominated	

=== Most Performed Blues & Roots Work ===
Title and/or artist	Writer(s)	Publisher(s)	Result	Ref.
"Been So Good, Been So Far" by Tim Rogers & The Twin Set	Tim Rogers	Universal Music Publishing	Nominated	
"Brand New Man" by Tex Perkins and the Fat Rubber Band	Tex Perkins, Matthew Walker	Universal Music Publishing / Sony Music Publishing	Nominated	
"Dancing in the Dark" by Ziggy Alberts	Ziggy Alberts	Kobalt Music Publishing	Won	
"Dollar Bill" by Blues Arcadia	Alan Boyle, Christian Harvey	—N/a	Nominated	
"The Howling Dogs" by Frank Sultana	Frank Sultana	—N/a	Nominated	

=== Most Performed Country Work ===
Title and/or artist	Writer(s)	Publisher(s)	Result	Ref.
"Got it Good" by James Johnston	Melanie Dyer, James Johnston, Michael Delorenzis, Michael Paynter	Mushroom Music	Nominated	
"Last Time Last" by Brad Cox	Brad Cox, Phil Barton, John Pierce	Mushroom Music, Sony Music Publishing, Mushroom Music, Universal/MCA Music Publishing	Nominated	
"Over for You" by Morgan Evans	Morgan Evans, Madison Love, Tim Sommers, Geoffrey Warburton	Warner Chappell Music	Nominated	
"Same Songs" by James Johnston and Kaylee Bell	Kaylee Bell, James Johnston, Gavin Carfoot, Jared Porter, Nolan Wynne	—N/a	Nominated	
"Summer Nights" by Casey Barnes	Casey Barnes, Michael Delorenzis, Michael Paynter	—N/a	Won	

=== Most Performed Dance/Electronic Work ===
Title and/or artist	Writer(s)	Publisher(s)	Result	Ref.
"Burn Dem Bridges" by Skin on Skin	Emmanuel John, Mozis Aduu, Jordan Bedeau, Micah Bedeau, Konnan Maier-Kouame	Sony Music Publishing	Nominated	
"Miracle Maker" by Dom Dolla featuring Clementine Douglas	Dominic Matheson p.k.a. Dom Dolla, Clementine Douglas, Mark Anthony Hilaire, Caitlin Stubbs	Sony Music Publishing / CAS Music / Mushroom Music / Sentric Music Publishing	Nominated	
"Never Let You Go" by Jason Derulo and Shouse	Sean Congues, Jack Madin and Edward Service p.k.a. Shouse, Jason Desrouleaux p.k.a. Jason Derulo	Sentric Music Publishing / ONELOVE Publishing / Universal Music Publishing	Won	
"Spend It" by Peking Duk featuring Circa Waves	Jackson Brazier, Adam Hyde, Samuel Littlemore, Reuben Styles-Richards, Gustav Gaellhagen, Johan Gustafsson, Kieran Shudall	Kobalt Music Publishing o.b.o. Dew Process / BMG / Universal Music Publishing / Sentric Music Publishing	Nominated	
"You Know What I Need" by PNAU and Troye Sivan	Nick Littlemore, Samuel Littlemore, Peter Mayes p.k.a. PNAU and Troye Sivan	Universal Music Publishing / Universal/MCA Music Publishing /Sentric Music Publishing / Sony Music Publishing	Nominated	

=== Most Performed Hard Rock / Heavy Metal Work ===
Title and/or artist	Writer(s)	Publisher(s)	Result	Ref.
"60cm of Steel" by Alpha Wolf & Holding Absence	John Arnold, Mitchell Fogarty, Lochlan Keogh, Sabian Lynch, Scott Simpson	Cooking Vinyl Publishing	Nominated	
"Darker Still" by Parkway Drive	Benjamin Gordon, Luke Kilpatrick, Jeffrey Ling, Winston McCall, George Hadjichristou	Kobalt Music Publishing	Won	
"Dragon" by King Gizzard & the Lizard Wizard	Michael Cavanagh, Nicholas Craig, Ambrose Kenny-Smith, Stu Mackenzie, Joey Walker	Kobalt Music Publishing	Nominated	
"Inhumane" by Polaris	Daniel Furnari, Jamie Hails, Rick Schneider, Ryan Siew, Jacob Steinhauser, Shawn Mayer	Kobalt Music Publishing	Nominated	
"It's Hell Down Here" by The Amity Affliction	Joel Birch, Daniel Brown, Ahren Stringer, Joseph Longobardi	Concord ANZ / Kobalt Music Publishing	Nominated	

=== Most Performed Hip Hop / Rap Work ===
Title and/or artist	Writer(s)	Publisher(s)	Result	Ref.
"And We" by Hooligan Hefs	Cooper Bedford, Simeona Malagamaalii p.k.a. Hooligan He's, Nepomsein Irakunda, Liridona Rusiti	Mushroom Music	Nominated	
"Bona" by Sampa the Great	Sampa Tembo p.k.a. Sampa the Great, Magnus Mando, Samuel Masta, Sam Nyambe	Kobalt Music Publishing	Nominated	
"Comma's" by Onefour featuring Cg	Spencer Magalogo, Jerome Misa, Salec Su'a, Bailey Pickles, Chandler Hammond, Hugo Hui, Caleb Tiedemann	Sony Music Publishing	Won	
"Laced Up" by Hilltop Hoods	Barry Francis, Matthew Lambert, Daniel Smith, Andrew Burford, Marlon Gerbes, Chris Mac, Matiu Walters	Sony Music Publishing / Kobalt Music Publishing	Nominated	
"Ring-a-Ling" by Tkay Maidza	Tkay Maidza, Pa Salieu Gaye, Cassio Lopes, Kendrick Nicholls, Sherwyn Nicholls, Michael Oatman	Kobalt Music Publishing / Mushroom Music	Nominated	

=== Most Performed Pop Work ===
Title and/or artist	Writer(s)	Publisher(s)	Result	Ref.
"How Do I Say Goodbye" by Dean Lewis	Dean Lewis, Jon Hume	Kobalt Music Publishing / Concord ANZ	Won	
"Only Wanna Be With You" by Amy Shark	Amy Billings p.k.a. Amy Shark, Grant Averill, Joseph Spargur	Mushroom Music	Nominated	
"Love Again" by The Kid LAROI	Charlton Howard p.k.a. The Kid Laroi, Omer Fedi, Billy Walsh, Henry Walter	Sony Music Publishing / Universal/MCA Music Publishing	Nominated	
"Ready for the Sky" by Budjerah	Budjerah, Ainslie Wills	Mushroom Music / Sony Music Publishing	Nominated	
"Therapy" by Budjerah	Sarah Aarons, Ajay Bhattacharyya	Sony Music Publishing	Nominated	

=== Most Performed R&B / Soul Work ===
Title and/or artist	Writer(s)	Publisher(s)	Result	Ref.
"Change Has to Come" by Mo'Ju	Mojo Ruiz de Luzuriaga p.k.a. Mo'Ju, Lewis Coleman Henry Jenkins	Universal Music Publishing / Mushroom Music o.b.o. Ivy League Music	Nominated	
"Cinderella" by JKing	Jordan Samatua	—N/a	Won	
"Falling" by Dean Brady	Dean Brady, Jacob Farah, Jerome Farah, Kara-Lee James, Tim Omaji, Rahel Phillips	Mushroom Music	Nominated	
"Goodbye" by Forest Claudette	Kobe Hamilton-Reeves p.k.a. Forest Claudette, Alexander Laska	Concord ANZ	Nominated	
"Oceans of Emotions" by The Teskey Brothers	Josh Teskey, Sam Teskey	Mushroom Music o.b.o. Ivy League Music	Nominated	

=== Most Performed Rock Work ===
Title and/or artist	Writer(s)	Publisher(s)	Result	Ref.
"Good Time" by Polish Club	David Novak and John-Henry Pajak p.k.a. Polish Club, Robby De Sá	Sony Music Publishing	Won	
"I Want You" by The Buoys	Zoe Catterall, Courtney Cunningham, Hilary Geddes, Tessa Wilkin p.k.a. The Buoys	—N/a	Nominated	
"Lookin' Out" by King Stingray	Theo Dimathaya Burarrwanga, Yimila Gurruwiwi, Roy Kellaway, Campbell Messer, Lewis Stiles, Yirrŋa Gotjiringu Yunupingu	Sony Music Publishing	Nominated	
"Nullarbor Plain" by Ian Moss	Ian Moss, Troy Cassar-Daley	Mushroom Music	Nominated	
"Sorry Instead" by Spacey Jane	Ashton Hardman-Le Cornu, Caleb Harper, Kieran Lama, Peppa Lane p.k.a. Spacey Jane	Kobalt Music Publishing o.b.o. Dew Process	Nominated	

=== Most Performed International Work ===
Title and/or artist	Writer(s)	Publisher(s)	Result	Ref.
"Anti-Hero" by Taylor Swift	Taylor Swift, Jack Antonoff	Universal/MCA Music Publishing / Sony Music Publishing	Won	
"Celestial" by Ed Sheeran	Ed Sheeran, Steve Mac, Johnny McDaid	Sony Music Publishing / Universal Music Publishing	Nominated	
"Flowers" by Miley Cyrus	Miley Cyrus, Gregory Hein, Michael Pollack	Sony Music Publishing / Concord ANZ / Warner Chappell Music	Nominated	
"I'm Good (Blue)" by David Guetta and Bebe Rexha	David Guetta, Bebe Rexha, Massimo Gabutti, Maurizio Lobina, Philip Plested, Camille Purcelle, Gianfranco Randone	Origin Music Publishing & Peermusic / BMG / Sony Music Publishing	Nominated	
"Unholy" by Sam Smith and Kim Petras	Sam Smith, Kim Petras, Omer Fedi, James Napier, Ilya Salmanzadeh, Blake Slatkin, Henry Walter	Warner Chappell Music / Kobalt Music Publishing / Universal/MCA Music Publishing	Nominated	

== Art Music Awards ==
Expected to be announced in July 2024.

== Screen Music Awards ==
Expected to be announced in September 2024.
