= Send It! =

Single by Hooligan Hefs
- Released: 18 November 2020
- Length: 2:31
- Label: DB Music; Warner Music Australia
- Songwriter(s): Kiril Ivanoski; Simionela Silapa
- Producer(s): Open Till L8

Hooligan Hefs singles chronology
"Party With Gang" (2020)	"Send It!" (2020)	"Don't Cross the Line" (2021)

Music video
- "Send It!" on YouTube

"Send It!" is a song by Australian hip-hop musician Hooligan Hefs, released as a standalone single on 18 November 2020 through DB Music and Warner Music Australia. It debuted and peaked at number 31 on the ARIA Singles Chart, becoming Hefs' highest entry to date.

At the 2021 ARIA Music Awards, the song was nominated for Song of the Year. At the APRA Music Awards of 2022, the song was nominated for Most Performed Hip Hop/Rap Work.

== Background ==
Alongside hip-hop artist Open Till L8, Hooligan Hefs recalled that when they conjured up the song, they "knew it was a big tune" with Hefs saying upon release that he was "keen to finally get it out to the people. This is the song for summer, grab your drink, Send It! and party hard."

== Critical reception ==
Al Newstead from triple j called the song "an unapologetically energetic party banger".

Brittany Jenke from Tone Deaf called the song "an absolute banger", saying "it's got absolutely everything you could ever want in a hip-hop jam – thrilling beats, a driving chorus and unparalleled rhythms that will get you moving about right quick". Jenke opined the song "...marks a monumental moment in Hooligan Hefs' music career, helping him to redefine the genre of homegrown hip-hop and cementing him in the music scene as an artist with his own trail to blaze".

== Music video ==
The music video was produced by Jaen Collective, directed by Jon Baxter and released on 18 November 2020. In the video, Hooligan Hefs is wearing a hi-vis vest and drives around on a postie bike before arriving at a party after the day's work.

== Charts ==
=== Weekly charts ===
Weekly chart performance for "Send It!"
Chart (2020–2021)	Peak position
New Zealand Hot Singles (RMNZ)	9
Australia (ARIA)	37
Tinie Tempah remix
New Zealand Hot Singles (RMNZ)	10

=== Year-end charts ===
Year-end hart performance for "Send It!"
Chart (2021)	Position
Australia (ARIA)	87

== Certifications ==
Region	Certification	Certified units/sales
Australia (ARIA)	3× Platinum	210,000^{‡}
^{‡} Sales+streaming figures based on certification alone.
