= And We =

Single by Hooligan Hefs

from the album Sinning Winning Living
- Released: 25 July 2023
- Length: 2:41
- Label: Biordi
- Songwriter(s): Simionela Silapa
- Producer(s): Colcci, 2xKuda, ILIR808

Hooligan Hefs singles chronology
"On Me" (2023)	"And We" (2023)	"Let it Spray" (2023)

Music video
- "And We" on YouTube

"And We" is a song by Australian hip-hop musician Hooligan Hefs, released in July 2023 as the lead single from Hef's second EP, Sinning Winning Living. It peaked at number 58 on the ARIA Singles Chart.

At the APRA Music Awards of 2024, the song was nominated for Most Performed Hip Hop / Rap Work.

== Versions ==
Digital download/streaming

1. "And We" – 2:41
1. "And We" (featuring Dimatik) (NRG Official remix) – 3:01
1. "And We" (Skux remix) – 2:16

== Charts ==
Weekly chart performance for "And We"
Chart (2023)	Peak position
Australia (ARIA)	58
New Zealand (Recorded Music NZ)	31

== Certifications ==
Region	Certification	Certified units/sales
Australia (ARIA)	Gold	35,000^{‡}
^{‡} Sales+streaming figures based on certification alone.
