= Therapy (Budjerah song) =

2023 single by Budjerah

Single by Budjerah
- Released: 10 February 2023
- Length: 3:12
- Label: Warner Music Australia
- Songwriters: Sarah Aarons; Ajay Bhattacharyya
- Producer: Stint

Budjerah singles chronology
"Who Would Imagine a King" (2022)	"Therapy" (2023)	"Heavy Love" (2023)

Music video
- "Therapy" on YouTube

"Therapy" is a song by Australian singer Budjerah, released on 10 February 2023.

Budjerah said noted it's an ode to the importance of therapy and open communication in relationships, saying "When I first heard the demo for 'Therapy', it hit me at the perfect time. I was going through a few things and the song really nailed how I was feeling at the time. 'Therapy' is about frustration in a relationship - It's the thoughts and feelings that can erupt when you don't understand each other and that can be tough to deal with. Therapy can come in many forms, but taking a step back and getting an outside perspective is something that has helped me."

The song was released a week before the commencement of the Australian leg of Ed Sheeran's +–=÷× Tour of which Budjerah was the support act.

In April 2023, a live version, recorded at Adelaide Oval during the Sheeran tour was released.

In May 2023, a stripped back version was released. In June, a version featuring YDE was released.

At the National Indigenous Music Awards 2023, the song was nominated for Song of the Year and Film Clip of the Year.

At the 2023 ARIA Music Awards, the song was nominated for Song of the Year, Best Pop Release and Best Video. At the APRA Music Awards of 2024, the song was nominated for Song of the Year, Most Performed Pop Work and Most Performed Australian Work.

The song was nominated for Best Single at the 2024 Rolling Stone Australia Awards.

== Critical reception ==
Emma Whines from The Music said "Featuring some Flume-like synths, pop-heavy guitar riffs and driving beats, the song is a step up for Budjerah and sees him sitting up among the big dogs. The song's highlight is obviously Budjerah's incredible vocals, as he finds his footing in a new pop-soul sound that still pays respect to his gospel roots. Each song he releases only further proves that he's currently one of the best vocalists in Australia."

== Track listings ==
Digital download/streaming

1. "Therapy" – 3:12

Digital download/streaming

1. "Therapy" – 3:12
2. "Therapy" (Live from the Ed Sheeran tour) – 3:05

Digital download/streaming

1. "Therapy" – 3:12
2. "Therapy" (Live from the Ed Sheeran tour) – 3:05
3. "Therapy" (Stripped back) – 4:02

Digital download/streaming

1. "Therapy" (featuring YDE) – 3:12
2. "Therapy" – 3:12

== Charts ==
=== Weekly charts ===
Weekly chart performance for "Therapy"
Chart (2023)	Peak position
Australian Artist Singles (ARIA)	6

=== Year-end charts ===
2023 year-end chart performance for "Therapy"
Chart (2023)	Position
Australian Artist (ARIA)	35

== Certifications ==
Certifications for "Therapy"
Region	Certification	Certified units/sales
Australia (ARIA)	Platinum	70,000^{‡}
^{‡} Sales+streaming figures based on certification alone.
