= Endemic Intelligence in Multiple Dimensions =

Studio album by Brad Cox
- Released: 25 September 2025
- Venue: 51:21
- Label: Warner Music Australia
- Producer: Chris Collins

Brad Cox chronology
Acres (2023)	Endemic Intelligence in Multiple Dimensions (2025)

Endemic Intelligence in Multiple Dimensions is the fourth studio album by Australian country musician Brad Cox, and first via Warner Music Australia after signing with them in September 2024. It was announced in May 2025 and released on 25 September 2025. The album peaked at number 7 on the ARIA Chart.

Cox said "I want to write about things that I really give a shit about. It's not enough anymore just writing about driving down a dirt road or sitting around having a great time drinking beers, as right now there's people dying on the street because they can't pay the rent and that upsets me, you know? It's important to me. So the change was a conscious decision – I'm growing up, I'm 30 now, I understand life a bit more."

Cox also called it his "country adjacent" album, saying "I definitely didn't feel trapped by country music, but I haven't been influenced by country music in the last couple of years. For me, country music sits here and probably always will. I live that life, but it is just the next chapter."

At the 2026 Country Music Awards of Australia, the album was nominated for Contemporary Country Album of the Year and Album of the Year.

== Reception ==
ABC Country said "The album represents a significant shift in sound for Cox, exploring influences beyond the traditional rules of country music – and offering a blend of honest, heartland rock while maintaining his signature narrative."

Good Call Live said "Delivering what might be his most creatively charged and emotionally unguarded work to date, the songwriting feels unfiltered and unshackled from commercial expectation, while the production ventures confidently into bolder sonic territory. Inspired by The 1975, Bruce Springsteen and The War On Drugs, it’s a mature, fiercely personal album that rejects trend-hopping in favour of something more honest, and more real".

== Track listing ==
1. "Wadda Plantation" - 0:31
2. "Sunset Psalm" 4:09
3. "The High Cost of Living" (featuring Randy Houser) - 3:22
4. "Peaches and Cream" - 2:50
5. "Everything I've Got" - 4:41
6. "Kickin' Stones" - 3:07
7. "Dance with the Moon" - 3:44
8. "Wait On the Day" - 4:46
9. "Thick Skin" - 2:58
10. "Democracy Manifest" - 3:26
11. "I'm a Boxer" - 3:02
12. "Country Ain't Country"- 3:55
13. "Keep Tappin' On" (featuring Jesse O'Neill and Rai Thistlethwayte) - 3:01
14. "Make a Life" - 3:34
15. "Vertigo" - 4:08

== Charts ==
Weekly chart performance for Endemic Intelligence in Multiple Dimensions
Chart (2025)	Peak position
Australian Albums (ARIA)	7

Year-end chart performance for Endemic Intelligence in Multiple Dimensions
Chart (2025)	Position
Australian County Albums (ARIA)	74
