= My Mind's Projection =

Studio album by Brad Cox
- Released: 6 November 2020
- Studios: Love Hz Studios, The Brown Owl, Jungle Studios
- Length: 43:39
- Label: Sony Music Australia
- Producer: Matt Fell

Brad Cox chronology
Brad Cox (2018)	My Mind's Projection (2020)	What's Your Favourite Country Song? (2021)

My Mind's Projection is the second studio album by Australian country musician Brad Cox. It was released on 6 November 2020 and peaked at number 12 on the ARIA Chart.

The album includes the three number 1 country radio singles "Give Me Tonight", "Drinking Season" and "Remedy" with Adam Eckersley.

Upon release, Cox said "My Mind’s Projection is a snapshot of songs that I've written, things that I've done and things that I've experienced in the last three years. It's what I've felt and seen and done and heard and then felt again all rolled into one."

At the 2021 ARIA Music Awards, the album was nominated for Best Country Album.

== Reception ==
Ellie Robinson from Australian Guitar Magazine said "On his slick and smoky second album, Brad Cox goes above and beyond the staples of the Americana rulebook, delivering a truly rich and riveting collection of to-be campfire classics and barnyard bangers" and calling it "one of 2020s best country releases".

Country HQ said "Brad Cox's sophomore album, My Mind’s Projection, firmly establishes the Australian country artist as one of the genre's brightest emerging talents. With this release, Cox delivers a heartfelt, honest and emotionally charged collection of songs that explore love, heartbreak, self-reflection, and the complexities of modern life."

== Track listing ==
1. Hold Me Back" - 3:05
2. Drinking Season" - 2:53
3. Short Lived Love" - 4:38
4. Remedy" (featuring Adam Eckersley) - 4:21
5. My Mind's Projection" - 3:22
6. Wasted Time" - 3:19
7. Thought I Knew Love" - 3:08
8. Give Me Tonight" - 3:41
9. I Keep Driving" - 3:24
10. Caught in a Noose by a Stranger" - 8:15
11. I Still Want More" - 3:33

== Charts ==
Chart performance for My Mind's Projection
Chart (2020)	Peak position
Australian Albums (ARIA)	12
