= Area Baby =

Studio album by Youngn Lipz
- Released: 6 August 2021
- Recorded: 2019–2021
- Label: Biordi Music
- Producers: Youngn Lipz, Beats with Steph, Open Til L8, Will Roman, Vivek Mistri, Paradigm & Zaihbeats, Slade, Prince Amir & Cameron Gee, Colcci

Singles from Area Baby
- 1. "Spaceship" Released: 6 May 2021; 2. "Broken Home" Released: 24 June 2021; 3. "Misunderstood Pt. 2" Released: 6 August 2021

Area Baby is the debut studio album from Australian hip-hop musician Youngn Lipz. The album was released on 6 August 2021 and debuted at number 7 on the ARIA charts and number 10 on the RMNZ chart.

On the creation of the album, Youngn Lipz said "In Australia – Western Sydney in particular – 'The Area' is what we call our hood, our ends. This album is inspired by my life, surroundings and general come-up in this environment. Everything I've seen and been a part of – friends, family, the ups and downs. But this story isn't just about the past, it's about where I'm at now and where I'm headed, too. I hope that people listening to this project understand this is my story and there's no other way around it. I'd want anyone that's listening, who ever doubted themselves or doesn't think they can go anywhere or be something, to know that as long as you believe and put in that work, you'll get there."

"Spaceship" was released as the first official single from the album in May 2021. The album includes four singles previously released in 2019 and 2020, including the APRA Music Award winning song "Misunderstood".

At the 2021 ARIA Music Awards, the album was nominated for Best Hip Hop Release.

== Reception ==
Professional ratings
Review scores
Source	Rating
Clash Music	7/10 stars

Ramy Abou-Setta from Clash Music called the album "A bold debut offering" saying the album has "a collection of beautiful melodies and hooks to keep you listening for hours."

Robert Moran from Sydney Morning Herald said "Songs like 'Broken Home', 'Silent', 'Stuck' and 'Falcons', with lyrics about being 'caught in the system' and friends doing time, depict a troubled youth." but added "The album isn't just brooding contemplation though, it's also fun. 'Say It', with its playful bounce, should be a global summertime hit, while 'Misunderstood' and 'Everyday' trade in sensitive thug romance."

== Track listing ==
No.	Title	Writer(s)	Length
1.	"Area Baby"	Filipo Faaoloii	2:41
2.	"Visions"	Faaoloii	3:18
3.	"Silent"	Faaoloii	3:03
4.	"Falcons"	Faaoloii	2:20
5.	"No Love"	Faaoloii	2:44
6.	"Misunderstood"	Faaoloii	2:29
7.	"Everyday"	Faaoloii	2:51
8.	"Say It"	Faaoloii	3:03
9.	"Stuck"	Faaoloii	2:39
10.	"Before"	Faaoloii	2:08
11.	"Broken Home"	Faaoloii, SephGotTheWaves	3:09
12.	"Restart"	Faaoloii	2:51
13.	"Spaceship"	Faaoloii	3:04
14.	"Misunderstood Pt.2" (featuring M Huncho)	Faaoloii, M Huncho	2:45
15.	"Fallen"	Faaoloii	3:14

== Charts ==
Chart performance for Area Baby
Chart (2021)	Peak position
Australian Albums (ARIA)	7
New Zealand Albums (RMNZ)	10

== Release history ==
List of release dates, showing formats, label, catalogue and reference
Region	Date	Format(s)	Label	Catalogue	Ref.
Various	6 August 2021	digital download, streaming	Biordi Music	—N/a	
Australia	27 August 2021	CD	Biordi Music	BMYL001	
