= Ready for the Sky =

2022 single by Budjerah

Single by Budjerah
- Released: 21 July 2022
- Length: 3:17
- Label: Warner Music Australia
- Songwriters: Budjerah Slabb; Ainslie Wills
- Producer: Chris Collins

Budjerah singles chronology
"Get Down" (2022)	"Ready for the Sky" (2022)	"Sweet Disposition" (2022)

Music video
- "Ready for the Sky" (Live at Bakehouse Studios) on YouTube

"Ready for the Sky" is a song by Australian singer Budjerah, released on 21 July 2022.

In a statement, Budjerah said "'Ready for the Sky' was written back in 2020, when everyone really wanted to go out and have fun again, and I wanted to talk about that ambitious feeling I had of being ready to go back into the world."

The song placed second in the 2022 Vanda & Young Global Songwriting Competition.

At the APRA Music Awards of 2023, the song was shortlisted for Song of the Year.

At the 2023 Rolling Stone Australia Awards, the song was nominated for Best Single.

At the APRA Music Awards of 2024, the song was nominated for Most Performed Australian Work and Most Performed Pop Work.

== Critical reception ==
Tyler Jenke from Music Feeds called it "a soulful number that showcases Budjerah's immersive vocal and lyrical skills."

Jo Forrest from Total Ntertainment said, "A potent combination of smoldering soul, R&B stylings and deep grooves, 'Ready for the Sky' showcases Budjerah's smooth and agile vocals – and an evolution of his sound."

== Track listings ==
Digital download/streaming

1. "Ready for the Sky" – 3:17

Digital download/streaming (remixes)

1. "Ready for the Sky" – 3:17
2. "Ready for the Sky" (Live at the Bakehouse) – 4:04
3. "Ready for the Sky" (Harvey Southerland remix) – 4:08
4. "Ready for the Sky" (Harvey Southerland remix) – 3:20
5. "Ready for the Sky" (Taka Perry remix) – 3:30
6. "Ready for the Sky" (Kinder remix) – 3:08
7. "Ready for the Sky" (Acapella version) – 3:02
8. "Ready for the Sky" (instrumental) – 3:17
