= May-a =

Australian musician

- Born: Maya Cumming; 24 August 2001 (age 25); Sydney
- Origin: Sydney
- Occupations: Singer; songwriter
- Instruments: Vocals; guitar
- Years active: 2019–present
- Labels: Sony Music Australia (2020-present), Atlantic Records (2021-2024)
- Website: www.may-amusic.com

Maya Cumming (born 2001), known professionally as May-a (stylised as MAY-A), is an Australian singer-songwriter from Sydney.

On 2 February 2022, Cumming was featured on the single "Say Nothing", a collaboration with Australian electronic musician and producer Flume.

== Early life ==
May-a grew up in Sydney, but moved to Byron in 2010. She moved back to Sydney age 13. While living in Byron Bay she competed in songwriting competitions, and performed street busking around the ages of 11 to 14. She started out posting videos on YouTube under the username Heyit'smaya.

Prior to discovering her attraction to women, May-a stated she was in a "super awkward" relationship with a boy that inspired her song "Apricots".

== Career ==
May-a released her debut single "Fools Paradise" in September 2019. This was followed by "All Girls Aren't the Same", which is a twist of Juice WRLD's "All Girls Are the Same" and is a song about how women should know their worth, everyone is an individual with different quirks."

On 1 May 2020, May-a released her third single, "Green" saying "'Green' is an outlook on the way that validation fuels the way we live, especially in green teens. Young, impressionable and desperate to be accepted by people they don't even like." adding "I wrote it when I was 15 and bored by the hierarchy of high school. It paints a picture of the things that teenagers think are important until they realise they aren't."

In August 2020, May-a toured with Wafia and signed with Sony Music Australia.

In 2021, May-A signed with Atlantic Records in the United States.

Her debut EP, Don't Kiss Ur Friends, was released on 6 August 2021. The EP debuted at number 31 on the ARIA Charts. In 2021, she signed with Atlantic Records in the US ahead of her debut EP, Don’t Kiss Ur Friends

In January 2023, May-a released "Sweat You Out My System".

May-a topped Triple J Hottest 100, 2022 with a feature on Australian musician Flume's song "Say Nothing". The song was also featured in the 2022 Netflix show Heartbreak High.

Following a period of recording between Australia and Los Angeles, in June 2023, May-a released "Lola" and announced her second EP Analysis Paralysis.

May-A split from Atlantic in late 2024, referencing "many compromises" on the Analysis Paralysis EP.

In 2025, May-A performed "Girls Just Want to Have Fun" with Cyndi Lauper on her Sydney Girls Just Wanna Have Fun Farewell Tour

In November 2025 May-a announced her debut album, Goodbye (If You Call That Gone). It was released on 20 February 2026.

== Discography ==
=== Albums ===
List of albums with selected details
Title	Details	Peak chart positions
Title	Details	AUS
Goodbye (If You Call That Gone)	Released: 20 February 2026; Label: May-a, Sony Music Australia (19958400861); Format: LP, digital	46

=== Extended plays ===
List of EPs, with release date and label shown
Title	EP details	Peak chart positions
Title	EP details	AUS
Don't Kiss Ur Friends	Released: 6 August 2021; Label: Sony (194399351314); Formats: digital download, streaming	31
Analysis Paralysis	Released: 1 September 2023; Label: Sony (196588291616); Formats: LP, digital download, streaming	70

=== Singles ===
==== As lead artist ====
List of singles, with year released and album name shown
Title	Year	Peak chart positions	Album
Title	Year	NZ Hot	Album
"Fool's Paradise"	2019	—	Non-album singles
"All Girls Aren't the Same"	2019	—	Non-album singles
"Green"	2020	—	Non-album singles
"Apricots"	2020	—	Don't Kiss Ur Friends
"Time I Love to Waste"	2021	—	Don't Kiss Ur Friends
"Swing of Things"	2021	—	Don't Kiss Ur Friends
"Central Station"	2021	—	Don't Kiss Ur Friends
"Talk" (with Budjerah)	2021	—	Conversations
"Junk Truck Head Fuck" (with DMA's)	2021	—	I Love You Unconditionally, Sure Am Going to Miss You
"Sweat You Out My System"	2023	38	Analysis Paralysis
"Your Funeral"	2023	—	Analysis Paralysis
"Lola"	2023	—	Analysis Paralysis
"Something Familiar"	2023	—	Analysis Paralysis
"[Redacted]"	2025	—	Goodbye (If You Call That Gone)
"(I'm Here for the) Girls"	2025	—	Goodbye (If You Call That Gone)
"Claws"	2025	—	Goodbye (If You Call That Gone)
"Catching Up 2 U"	2026	—	Goodbye (If You Call That Gone)
"Edge of Seventeen" (Like a Version)	2026	—	
"Writing's On the Wall"	2026	—	
"—" denotes a recording that did not chart.

==== As featured artist ====
List of singles, with year released, selected chart positions, and album name shown
Title	Year	Peak chart positions			Certifications	Album
Title	Year	AUS	NZ Hot	US Dance	Certifications	Album
"Say Nothing" (Flume featuring May-a)	2022	16	5	12	ARIA: 2× Platinum; RMNZ: Gold	Palaces

== Awards and nominations ==
=== AIR Awards ===
The Australian Independent Record Awards (commonly known informally as AIR Awards) is an annual awards night to recognise, promote and celebrate the success of Australia's Independent Music sector.

Year	Nominee / work	Award	Result	Ref.
2023	"Say Nothing" (with Flume)	Best Independent Dance, Electronica or Club Single	Nominated	

=== APRA Awards ===
The APRA Awards are presented annually from 1982 by the Australasian Performing Right Association (APRA), "honouring composers and songwriters". They commenced in 1982.

Year	Nominee / work	Award	Result	Ref.
2023	"Say Nothing" (Flume featuring May-a)	Song of the Year	Won	
2023	"Say Nothing" (Flume featuring May-a)	Most Performed Dance/ Electronic Work of the Year	Nominated	
2024	May-a (Maya Cumming)	Emerging Songwriter of the Year	Nominated	
2024	"Sweat You Out My System" by May-a (Maya Cumming p.k.a. May-a, Robby De Sá)	Most Performed Alternative Work	Nominated	

=== ARIA Music Awards ===
The ARIA Music Awards is an annual ceremony presented by Australian Recording Industry Association (ARIA), which recognise excellence, innovation, and achievement across all genres of the music of Australia. They commenced in 1987.

Year	Nominee / work	Award	Result	Ref.
2021	Don't Kiss Ur Friends	Breakthrough Artist	Nominated	
2022	"Say Nothing" (Flume featuring May-a)	Best Pop Release	Nominated	
2022	"Say Nothing" (Flume featuring May-a)	Song of the Year	Nominated	
2022	"Say Nothing" (Flume featuring May-a)	Best Video	Nominated	
2023	Murli Dhir for May-a – "Lola"	Best Video	Nominated	

=== J Awards ===
The J Awards are an annual series of Australian music awards that were established by the Australian Broadcasting Corporation's youth-focused radio station Triple J. They commenced in 2005.

Year	Nominee / work	Award	Result	Ref.
2022	"Say Nothing" by Flume featuring Maya (directed by Michael Hili)	Australian Video of the Year	Nominated	

=== NSW Music Prize ===
The NSW Music Prize aims to "celebrate, support and incentivise" the NSW's most talented artists, with "the aim of inspiring the next generations of stars". It commenced in 2025.

Year	Nominee / work	Award	Result	Ref.
2026	Goodbye (If You Call That Gone)	NSW Music Prize	Nominated	

=== Rolling Stone Australia Awards ===
The Rolling Stone Australia Awards are awarded annually in January or February by the Australian edition of Rolling Stone magazine for outstanding contributions to popular culture in the previous year.

Year	Nominee / work	Award	Result	Ref.
2022	May-a	Best New Artist	Won	

=== Vanda and Young Global Songwriting competition ===
The Vanda & Young Global Songwriting Competition is an annual competition that "acknowledges great songwriting whilst supporting and raising money for Nordoff-Robbins" and is coordinated by Albert Music and APRA AMCOS. It commenced in 2009.

Year	Nominee / work	Award	Result	Ref.
2021	"Time I Love to Waste"	Vanda & Young Global Songwriting Competition	3rd	
2025	"(I'm Here for The) Girls"	Vanda & Young Global Songwriting Competition	Finalist	
