= High Visceral (Part One) =

Studio album by Psychedelic Porn Crumpets
- Released: 19 March 2016
- Length: 47:09
- Label: Self released
- Producer: Psychedelic Porn Crumpets

Psychedelic Porn Crumpets chronology
High Visceral (Part One) (2016)	High Visceral (Part Two) (2017)

High Visceral (Part One) is the debut studio album by Australian psychedelic rock band Psychedelic Porn Crumpets. It was released on 19 March 2016 and peaked at 61 on the ARIA charts.

== Composition and recording ==
The album was recorded in a barn converted to a studio where some other local Australian bands would play. Some of the first songs on the album had vocals recorded through a SingStar microphone. Speaking of the inspirations for the album vocalist Jack McEwan cited 60's psych rock particularly noting how the rapid developments in recording technology broke the standards of commercialized music. He also always drawn back to riff focused instrumentals stating, "there’s something about a crash cymbal ringing out over a monster jam that will never get old."

The band had 14 "keeper" songs at the time of the album's release, but McEwan preferred to release 10-track albums, so the unused songs became the basis for what would become the sister album High Visceral (Part Two) one year later.

There was initially a track positioned before "Cornflake" called "Binge" that was spontaneously removed as little as a day prior to the album's release.

== Critical reception ==
Professional ratings
Review scores
Source	Rating
Awful Track Record	3.5/5
The Music	4/4 stars

Awful Track Record gave the album a 3.5/5 review saying that "they effortlessly surf through different soundscapes, styles, while keeping it coherent". The Music said that "the dedicated amongst listeners will reap a gorgeous sonic reward." in a 4 star review.

== Track listing ==
All tracks are written by Psychedelic Porn Crumpets.

No.	Title	Length
1.	"Cornflake"	3:37
2.	"Cubensis Lenses"	5:43
3.	"Marmalade March"	4:45
4.	"...and the Addled Abstraction of Being"	6:26
5.	"High Visceral"	2:31
6.	"Surf's Up"	3:13
7.	"Gallop to Southport"	2:33
8.	"Found God in a Tomato"	8:54
9.	"Entropy"	1:54
10.	"Denmark / Van Gogh & Gone"	7:29
Total length:		47:09

10 Year Anniversary Limited Edition Bonus Disk
No.	Title	Length
1.	"Terraqueous"
2.	"Little Moon"
3.	"Made Machine"
4.	"Pi"
5.	"Entropy II"
6.	"The Thinker"
7.	"Binge (Demo)"
8.	"Sick Day (Demo)"
9.	"Grilled O'Clock & The Gavins (Demo)"
10.	"Sunrise Mind (Demo)"
11.	"Lonely Oak (Demo)"

== Personnel ==
- Psychedelic Porn Crumpets – recording, production
- Michael Jelinek – mixing and co-production
- Simon Struthers (Forensic Audio) – mastering
- J'aime Fazackerley – production coordination
- Zouassi – artwork
