= Conversations (Budjerah EP) =

EP by Budjerah
- Released: 8 April 2022
- Length: 19:55
- Label: Warner Music Australia
- Producers: Matt Corby; Konstantin Kersting; Chris Collins

Budjerah chronology
Budjerah (2021)	Conversations (2022)

Singles from Conversations
- 1. "Talk" Released: 24 September 2021; 2. "Wash My Sorrows Away" Released: 26 November 2021; 3. "What Should I Do?" Released: 25 February 2022; 4. "Get Down" Released: 8 April 2022

Conversations is the second extended play (EP) by Australian singer-songwriter Budjerah, released on 8 April 2022 by Warner Music Australia. The EP was announced on 25 February 2022, alongside the release of its third single, "What Should I Do?"

At the 2022 ARIA Music Awards, the EP earned Budjerah a nomination for Best Solo Artist and was nominated for Best Soul/R&B Release and Best Mixed Album.

== Reception ==
TotalNtertainment said "The Conversations EP sees Budjerah emerging as a clear-eyed young songwriter who's at turns heartbreaking and heartbroken, lovelorn and headstrong, singing about changing friendships and relationships with the vigour of youth and an exposed depth that belies his age. Reunited with long-term producers Matt Corby and Chris Collins, the EP reveals a darker, sleeker sound for Budjerah, reflective of the changes that have occurred in his life."

Dom Vigil from Prelude Press said "The seven song release finds him expanding even more on his signature soul/retro R&B sound in a way that'll have you hitting play all over again by the time it comes to an end. Bookended by the bright and summery 'Get Down' and the spectacular, confident finale, 'My Name', Conversations is made up of some of his best work yet."

== Track listing ==
Conversations track listing
No.	Title	Writer(s)	Length
1.	"Intro"	Matt Corby; Budjerah Slabb	0:37
2.	"Get Down"	Corby; Slabb	3:39
3.	"What Should I Do?"	Konstantin Kersting; Slabb	3:37
4.	"Wash My Sorrows Away"	Corby; Slabb	3:49
5.	"This Is the Interlude"	Corby; Slabb	1:20
6.	"Talk" (featuring May-a)	Chris Collins; Maya Cummings; Slabb	3:27
7.	"My Name"	Corby; Slabb	3:26
Total length:			19:55

== Charts ==
Chart performance for Conversations
Chart (2022)	Peak position
Australian Albums (ARIA)	97
