= Ainslie Wills =

Australian singer-songwriter

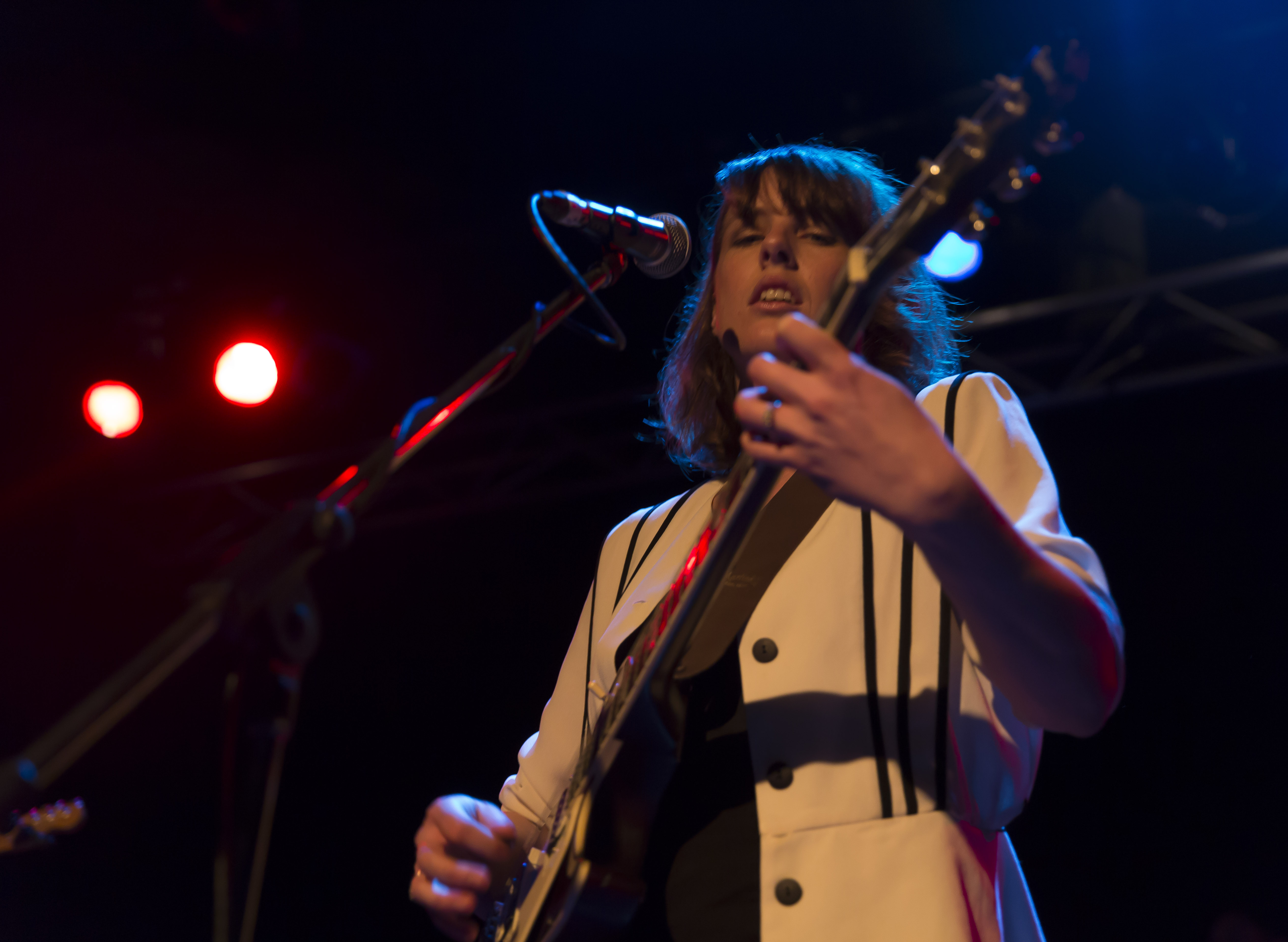

Background information
- Occupation: singer-songwriter
- Years active: 2007–present
- Label: Ainslie Wills
- Website: www.ainsliewills.com

Ainslie Wills is an Australian singer-songwriter.

== Career ==
=== 2005–2011: Early EPs ===
After graduating from the Victorian College of the Arts in 2005, Wills recorded and produced her debut recording. She collaborated with fellow VCA graduate Lawrence Folvig (Guitar) and Mirra Seigerman (Drums). Wills' first single "Wide Load" received critical acclaim and was supported by Triple J, via the Triple J Unearthed program. In May 2007, Wills released her self-titled debut EP, which included the single "Green Coloured Glass". She supported Missy Higgins at The Palais in 2007. Wills said "The Unearthed program is an incredible tool for artists, to build their profile, be accessible to the masses and to help them get commercial airplay. I was so fortunate that 'Wide Load' got picked up and everyone at Triple J has been nothing but supportive, it has helped me tremendously."

In 2010, Wills released Somebody for Everyone. Wills told Tone Dead "On my EP, I wrote and demoed all the tracks by myself and just handed them to the band, but (guitarist) Lawrence (Folvig) and I built most of these new songs together, we had really open conversations about ideas for the sounds we wanted and I think it's brought a lot more breadth to the tracks."

=== 2012–2018: You Go Your Way, I'll Go Mine ===
In April 2012, Wills released "Fighting Kind", the lead single from her debut studio album, You Go Your Way, I'll Go Mine

In February 2015, Wills released "Drive", the lead single from the EP Oh the Gold. "Drive was recorded over two days in Brisbane with co collaborators Lawrence Folvig, Arron Light and producer Matt Redlich. This was followed by "Hawaii" in April 2015. "Hawaii" was recorded in collaboration with guitarist Lawrence Folvig, drummer Arron Light and producer Matt Redlich.

=== 2019–present: All You Have Is All You Need ===
On 9 August 2019, Wills released All You Have Is All You Need. The album was nominated for the Australian Music Prize.

On 24 November 2023, Wills released the 4-track Pink EP.

== Discography ==
=== Studio albums ===
Title	Album details
You Go Your Way, I'll Go Mine	Released: 4 March 2013; Label: Ainslie Wills; Format: CD digital download, streaming
All You Have Is All You Need	Released: 9 August 2019; Label: Ainslie Wills; Format: CD, LP, digital download, streaming

=== Live albums ===
Title	Album details
All You Have Is All You Need Live	Released: 19 November 2019; Label: Ainslie Wills; Format: digital download, streaming

=== Extended plays ===
Title	EP details
Ainslie Wills	Released: 5 May 2007; Label: Ainslie Wills; Format: digital download
Somebody for Everyone	Released: June 2010; Label: Ainslie Wills; Format: digital download
Oh the Gold	Released: 14 September 2015; Label: Ainslie Wills; Format: digital download, streaming
Northern Star (with James Night)	Released: 1 October 2021; Label: Ainslie Wills; Format: digital download, streaming
Pink	Released: 24 November 2023; Label: Ainslie Wills; Format: digital download, streaming

=== Singles ===
Title	Year	Album
"Wide Load"	2007	non album single
"Green Coloured Glass"	2007	Ainslie Wills
"I'm Your Woman"	2010	Somebody for Everyone
"Fighting Kind"	2012	You Go Your Way, I'll Go Mine
"Stop Pulling the String"	2012	You Go Your Way, I'll Go Mine
"Drive"	2015	Oh the Gold
"Hawaii"	2015	Oh the Gold
"Young Turks"	2015	
"Running Second"	2017	All You Have Is All You Need
"Society"	2018	All You Have Is All You Need
"Fear of Missing Out"	2019	All You Have Is All You Need
"Two Strong Hearts"	2020	non album single
"This Is What Our Love Looks Like Now"	2021	non album single
"Northern Star" (with James Knight)	2021	Northern Star
"Mon amie la rose" (with So French So Chic)	2021	non album single
"Primal Animal" (reimagined)	2022	non album single
"Don't Dream It's Over"	2022	non album single
"Celebrate"	2023	Pink
"Eyes on Me"	2023	Pink
"People Pleaser"	2023	Pink
"Surrender"	2025	non album single

=== Other appearances ===
Title	Artist	Year	Album
"Young and Wild"	John Butler Trio	2014	Flesh & Blood
"So Soldier"	#1 Dads	2014	About Face
"Let It Die"	Katie Noonan	2014	Songs That Made Me
"Hymn to Her" (with Kylie Auldist, Deborah Conway, Angie Hart and Katie Noonan)	Katie Noonan	2014	Songs That Made Me
"Wide Load"	Various Artists	2015	Swam Theory
"Wasn't It Good" (with Ben Abraham)	Tina Arena	2017	Greatest Hits & Interpretations
"Steal My Heart Away" (with The Paper Kites)	The Paper Kites	2021	Roses
"Shoulda Coulda" (with Budjerah)	Budjerah	2021	Budjerah (Live At Rainbow Valley)

== Awards and nominations ==
=== AIR Awards ===
The Australian Independent Record Awards (commonly known informally as AIR Awards) is an annual awards night to recognise, promote and celebrate the success of Australia's Independent Music sector.

Year	Nominee / work	Award	Result	Ref.
2020	All You Have Is All You Need	Independent Album of the Year	Nominated	
2020	"Fear of Missing Out"	Independent Song of the Year	Nominated	

=== APRA Awards ===
The APRA Awards are presented annually from 1982 by the Australasian Performing Right Association (APRA), "honouring composers and songwriters".

Year	Nominee / work	Award	Result	Ref.
2017	herself	Professional Development Award	Won	
2018	"Running Scared" (Ainslie Wills, Lawrence Folvig)	Song of the Year	Nominated	
2019	"Society" (Ainslie Wills, Bram Inscore, MoZella)	Song of the Year	Nominated	
2020	"Fear Of Missing Out" (Ainslie Wills, Paul Dempsey, Lawrence Folvig, Arron Light)	Song of the Year	Shortlisted	
2023	"Ready for the Sky" (Budjerah, Ainslie Wills)	Song of the Year	Shortlisted	
2024	"Ready for the Sky" (Budjerah, Ainslie Wills)	Most Performed Australian Work	Pending	
2024	"Ready for the Sky" (Budjerah, Ainslie Wills)	Most Performed Pop Work	Pending	

=== Australian Music Prize ===
The Australian Music Prize (the AMP) is an annual award of $30,000 given to an Australian band or solo artist in recognition of the merit of an album released during the year of award.

Year	Nominee / work	Award	Result	Ref.
2019	All You Have Is All You Need	Album of the Year	Nominated	

=== EG Awards/Music Victoria Awards ===
The Music Victoria Awards (previously known as The Age EG Awards and The Age Music Victoria Awards) are an annual awards night celebrating Victorian music.

Year	Nominee / work	Award	Result	Ref.
2012	herselfself	Outstanding Achievement By a Victorian Artist	Nominated	

=== Vanda & Young Global Songwriting Competition ===
The Vanda & Young Global Songwriting Competition is an annual competition that "acknowledges great songwriting whilst supporting and raising money for Nordoff-Robbins" and is coordinated by Albert Music and APRA AMCOS. It commenced in 2009.

Year	Nominee / work	Award	Result	Ref.
2022	"Ready for the Sky" (Budjerah and Ainslie Wills)	Vanda & Young Global Songwriting Competition	2nd	
