= Psychedelic Porn Crumpets =

Australian psychedelic rock band

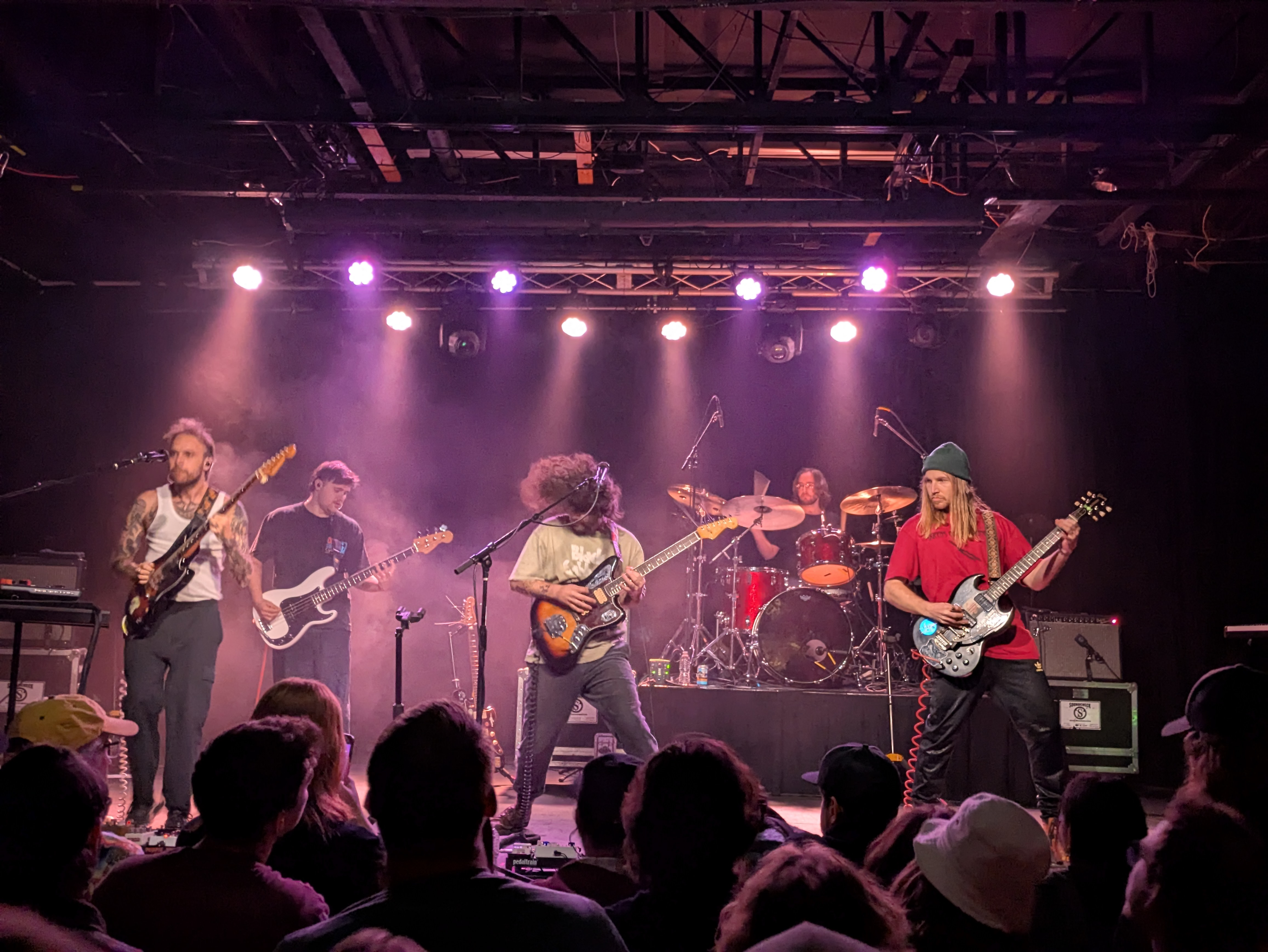
- Psychedelic Porn Crumpets at Metro Music Hall in Salt Lake City 2025.

Background information
- Origin: Perth, Western Australia
- Genre: Psychedelic rock
- Years active: 2014–present
- Labels: What Reality?; Rhubarb; Marathon Artists
- Members: Jack McEwan; Luke Parish; Danny Caddy; Chris Young; Jamie Reynolds
- Past members: Luke Reynolds; Wayan Biliondana
- Website: psychedelicporncrumpets.com

Psychedelic Porn Crumpets is an Australian psychedelic rock band formed in 2014 in Perth. The band were founded by English guitarist and singer Jack McEwan, guitarist Luke Parish, bassist Luke Reynolds, and drummer Danny Caddy, who began playing together in "an old horse barn in Leederville". Guitarist and keyboardist Chris Young joined in 2019, and bassist Luke Reynolds left in 2020, replaced by Wayan Biliondana, who was later replaced by Jamie Reynolds in mid-2024.

Their genre and sound has been compared to that of other popular psychedelic rock bands in Australia, such as King Gizzard & the Lizard Wizard and Tame Impala. They have self-described their sound as "an energetic mess of colour and tone". Concerning the reasoning behind the name of the band, its members have given little explanation, claiming it was chosen at random because they thought it was amusing.

== Career ==
The bandmates were friends prior to the creation of the band. It has been suggested that they became acquainted through their mutual drug dealer. The band began initially as a university project for a unit that Jack McEwan was taking at the time. They then continued to make music for their own enjoyment, as well as for that of their young local community in what has been described as “garage rave” type settings. They have made a point of retaining a 'DIY' band mantra, recording most of their own songs, as well as aiming to be very hands-on in their own advertisement.

Jack McEwan is the main songwriter, and the member credited with being the main pioneer behind the band. He was born in 1993. McEwan grew up in England, where his passion for music was kindled both by his father and through playing in bands from the age of nine onwards. His family migrated to Australia when he was thirteen. He also has a degree in graphic design, which he uses in creating the band's artwork.. Luke Parish has been quoted stating that the biggest influence on the guitar playing was David Gilmour of Pink Floyd.

The band went on in 2017 to create their own record label, What Reality? Records; McEwan told press that its creation was "only a matter of time". They have made clear that they chose to do this for reasons of "getting stuck into existence, taking a risk, pursuing ideas, setting goals and trying to dream big." The first release on this new label was a twin reissue of both parts of their High Visceral albums. One year after the release of their label, though, the band still had not signed any other musicians due to financial reasons, despite the fact that they still held an ideal vision for What Reality? Records as "a support structure for upcoming bands".

In 2018 came the release of their single, "Social Candy", which was overall well received and led to a brief national tour through October of the same year, passing through Melbourne, Adelaide, and Perth. This tour was when the band first introduced the back-up drummer Peter Coyne.

In May 2019, the band played in the UK at the All Points East music festival, at the Victoria Park event. In July 2019, following the release of their album, And Now for the Whatchamacallit, they embarked on a national tour passing through Adelaide, Brisbane, Melbourne, Sydney, and their hometown of Perth.

In October 2019, the band released the single "Mundungus", which was described by Music Fest News as "beautifully chaotic and explosive".

On 5 August 2020, the band released the single "Mr Prism".

On 5 February 2021, the band released the album Shyga! The Sunlight Mound. The band have played with Los Angeles-based Levitation Room.

On 15 October 2021, they released "Lava Lamp Pisco", the first single from their album Night Gnomes. Night Gnomes was released on 22 April 2022.

On 17 May 2023, the band released the single "Nootmare (K-I-L-L-I-N-G) Meow!" from their album Fronzoli. Three months later, on 24 August 2023, a second single from the album was released, called "(I'm a Kadaver) Alakazam". On 10 November 2023, Fronzoli was released.

On 14 November 2024, the band released the single "Another Reincarnation". Another single, "March on for Pax Romana", was released on 30 January 2025. On 27 March 2025, a third single, "Weird World Awoke", was released. A day later, the band announced their seventh album, Carpe Diem, Moonman. On 15 May 2025, Carpe Diem, Moonman was released. The band's eighth album, Pogo Rodeo, was released later in the year on 29 October 2025.

== Musical influences ==
The band has been cited saying that some of the inspiration for their music comes in part from classic rock of the 1960s and 1970s, such as Led Zeppelin, Black Sabbath, and the Beatles. However, they have been influenced by more than just the rock genre, getting inspiration also from experimental electronic jazz. Jack McEwan, the band's vocalist, has also mentioned that their influences are "pretty much identical" to those of Pond and Tame Impala, bands that are often viewed to be in the same sphere. McEwan has also stated that he believes Australia, and his hometown of Perth in specific to be a hotspot for rock music, and attributes the growth of the band partially to the live music scene in the city. Besides the Porn Crumpets, King Gizzard and the Lizard Wizard and Tame Impala, two of the band's influences, also hail from Australia. Some have given credit to King Gizzard and Tame Impala for creating the current Australian psychedelic rock scene. Many consider psychedelic rock to be Australia's main musical export in modern times, also citing the bands such as Pond, Orb, Gum and more as evidence for this claim.

The band is also commended on their music videos, which follow the same trance-like genre as their music, and have quoted a myriad of influences in this sphere such as Monty Python, TED Talks, and Woody Allen. As for the inspiration for the name of the band, Jack McEwan has quoted Mighty Boosh as a partial influence.

== Members ==
- Jack McEwan – lead vocals, guitar, bass guitar, mandolin, sitar, Mellotron, synthesizer (2014–present)
- Luke Parish – lead guitar, Mellotron, synthesizer, backing vocals (2014–present)
- Danny Caddy – drums (2014–present)
- Chris Young – guitar, keyboards (2019–present)
- Jamie Reynolds – bass guitar (2024–present)

Former members

- Luke Reynolds – bass guitar (2014–2020)
- Wayan Biliondana – bass guitar (2021–2024)

Touring members

- Peter Coyne – back-up drummer
- Rodney the Tortoise – backing vocals

== Discography ==
=== Studio albums ===
List of studio albums, with selected details
Title	Album details	Peak chart positions
Title	Album details	AUS
High Visceral (Part One)	Released: 19 March 2016; Label: Rhubarb (RHUPPC001); Formats: CD, LP, digital download, streaming	61
High Visceral (Part Two)	Released: 14 April 2017; Label: Rhubarb (RHUPPC003); Formats: CD, LP, digital download, streaming	82
And Now for the Whatchamacallit	Released: 31 May 2019; Label: What Reality? (WRRPPC008); Formats: CD, LP, digital download, streaming	31
Shyga! The Sunlight Mound	Released: 5 February 2021; Label: What Reality?/Marathon Artists (MA0272CD); Formats: CD, LP, digital download, streaming	4
Night Gnomes	Released: 22 April 2022; Label: What Reality?/Marathon Artists; Formats: CD, LP, digital download, streaming	48
Fronzoli	Released: 10 November 2023; Label: What Reality?/Marathon Artists; Formats: CD, LP, digital download, streaming	72
Carpe Diem, Moonman	Released: 15 May 2025; Label: What Reality?/Marathon Artists; Formats: CD, LP, digital download, streaming	— (Note: Carpe Diem, Moonman did not enter the ARIA Top 100 Chart, but peaked at number 8 on the Australian Artists Album Chart.)
Pogo Rodeo	Released: 29 October 2025; Label: What Reality?/Marathon Artists; Formats: CD, LP, digital download, streaming	—

=== Extended plays ===
List of EPs, with selected details
Title	EP details
High Visceral {B Sides}	Released: 15 December 2017; Label: What Reality? Records (WR?RPPC003); Formats: CD, LP, digital download, streaming

=== Other releases ===
List of other releases, with selected details
Title	Release details
USB-Sides	Released: 10 November 2023; Label: What Reality? Records (No existing ID); Formats: USB memory stick, digital download

== Awards and nominations ==
=== ARIA Music Awards ===
The ARIA Music Awards is an annual ceremony presented by Australian Recording Industry Association (ARIA), which recognise excellence, innovation, and achievement across all genres of the music of Australia. They commenced in 1987.

Year	Nominee / work	Award	Result	Ref.
2021	Shyga! The Sunlight Mound	Best Hard Rock or Heavy Metal Album	Nominated	

=== National Live Music Awards ===
The National Live Music Awards (NLMAs) are a broad recognition of Australia's diverse live industry, celebrating the success of the Australian live scene. The awards commenced in 2016.

Year	Nominee / work	Award	Result
2019	Psychedelic Porn Crumpets	Live Act of the Year	Nominated

=== West Australian Music Industry Awards ===
The West Australian Music Industry Awards (WAMIs) are annual awards presented to the local contemporary music industry, put on annually by the Western Australian Music Industry Association Inc (WAM). Psychedelic Porn Crumpets have won three awards.

Year	Nominee / work	Award	Result (wins only)
2018	Psychedelic Porn Crumpets	Most Popular Live Act	Won
2018	"Social Candy" (Psychedelic Porn Crumpets)	Best Music Video	Won
2020	"Mr Prism" (Psychedelic Porn Crumpets)	Best Music Video	Won
