= Camp Dog (song) =

2022 single by King Stingray

Single by King Stingray

from the album King Stingray
- Released: 14 March 2022
- Length: 3:39
- Label: Cooking Vinyl Australia
- Songwriter: Roy Kellaway
- Producer: Roy Kellaway

King Stingray singles chronology
"Milkumana" (2021)	"Camp Dog" (2022)	"Let's Go" (2022)

Music video
- "Camp Dog" on YouTube

"Camp Dog" is a song by Australian rock group King Stingray, released on 14 March 2022 as the fourth single from their self-titled debut studio album (2022).

The title refers to the dogs that wander the streets of Yirrkala, in East Arnhem Region, where the band members grew up. Guitarist Roy Kellaway said, "Life with the camp dogs... It's a really big part of growing up for us, everyone collectively looks after them. They all have so much character and you had to walk in certain areas to avoid the cheeky dogs.They were like the kings of the streets. [The song] is about an adoration for our life with our community dogs."

The song placed third in the 2022 Vanda & Young Global Songwriting Competition.

At the AIR Awards of 2023 the song was nominated for Independent Song of the Year.

== Music video ==
The animated music video was created by Reid McManus, with McManus saying "The music video follows a group of camp dogs getting up to all kinds of mischief. Every moment of the video is inspired by true experiences from the band members. There's also a lot of compassion and love for these camp dogs who are a part of the community." Lochie Schuster from Happy TV said "The video is a perfect pairing to the band's carefree brand of Yolŋu surf-rock, providing plenty of giggles, backboned by a stunning track full of catchy, fuzzed-out riffs and King Sting's signature, warm vocals."
