= Through the Trees (song) =

2024 single by King Stingray

Single by King Stingray

from the album For the Dreams
- Released: 22 March 2024
- Length: 3:08
- Label: Cooking Vinyl Australia
- Songwriters: Theo Dimathaya Burarrwanga, Roy Kellaway, Campbell Messer, Yirrnga Gotjiringu Yunupingu, Yimila Gurruwiwi, Lewi Stiles
- Producer: Roy Kellaway

King Stingray singles chronology
"Lookin' Out" (2023)	"Through the Trees" (2024)	"Best Bit" (2024)

Music video
- "Through the Trees" on YouTube

"Through the Trees" is a song by Australian rock group King Stingray. It premiered on Triple J on 20 March was released on 22 March 2024 as the second single for the band's second studio album, For the Dreams (2024).

Upon release, the group said "On the surface it's a fun travelling song representing adventure, but beneath the surface it talks more deeply on the concept of time and how precious it is. It's about overcoming adversity, coming out the other side, and reaching that breath of fresh air."

At the APRA Music Awards of 2025, the song was nominated for APRA Song of the Year and won Most Performed Rock Work. The song was nominated for the 2025 Environmental Music Prize.

== Music video ==
The Sam Brumby directed video was filmed in the Arnhem Land region of the Northern Territory and was released on 20 March 2024.

== Reception ==
Concetta Caristo and Courtney Fry from Triple J said "It's a driving, bouncy surf rock track that picks up the pace and energy and continues the signature King Stingray sound. Weaving Yolngu Matha and traditional harmonies allows 'Through the Trees' to build and swell, before reaching a stunning crescendo, like breaking through the dense canopy into the bright blue sky above."

Joseph Guenzler from National Indigenous Times said "The song features a powerful chorus and meaningful lyrics, delving into themes of overcoming adversity."
