= Environmental Music Prize =

Annual Australian music award

- Country: Australia
- Reward: $20,000
- First award: 2022; 4 years ago
- Final award: Current
- Website: environmentalmusicprize.com/prize/

The Environmental Music Prize is a prize launched in partnership with Green Music Australia. It aims to celebrate and amplify powerful music videos that inspire action for climate and conservation. It was launched during the United Nations Climate Change Conference in November 2021 and is a call-to-action for artists to use their voice both on and off stage. The Environmental Music Prize was launched as a quest to find a theme song to inspire action on climate and conservation.

== Awards by year ==
=== 2022 ===
To be eligible for the inaugural prize, Australian citizens and residents could apply between November 2021 and February 2022) if they had released an original work in the last 5 years that 1) referenced nature or an environmental issue in its lyrics, or in the visual content of its music video and 2) inspires us to protect the environment with a message of hope or a call-to-action, or highlights the urgency of action.

Between February and April 2022, a shortlisting committee composed of music ambassadors, environmental leaders and impact partners selected the 24 finalists. Public Voting commenced on Earth Day, 22 April 2022 and closed on 22 May 2022.

In June 2022, King Gizzard were announced as winners and donated the $20,000 prize money to The Wilderness Society.

Title	Artist	Result
"If Not Now, Then When?"	King Gizzard and the Lizard Wizard	Won
"Addicted to the Sunshine"	Lime Cordiale	Nominated
"Can't Take The Ocean Out of Me"	Billy Otto	Nominated
"Hello My Beautiful World"	Holy Holy	Nominated
"Hey Wanhaka"	King Stingray	Nominated
"Housefyre"	Briggs & Tim Minchin	Nominated
"In Love with This Place"	Jess Ribeiro	Nominated
"Messin' Me Up"	What So Not featuring Evan Giia	Nominated
"Mother"	L-FRESH the Lion featuring Moza and Mirrah	Nominated
"Our Song"	Tambah Project (Nidala Barker, Kyle Lionhart & Billy Otto)	Nominated
"Port Road"	Holy Holy	Nominated
"Say Something"	Eskimo Joe	Nominated
"Sky Was Blue - The Bushfire Song"	Reverend Bones	Nominated
"Sleep Australia Sleep"	Paul Kelly	Nominated
"Ta'u Tama"	Small Island Big Song	Nominated
"The Night"	Little Green	Nominated
"The Truth"	Rory Phillips	Nominated
"Voices"	Sage Roadknight	Nominated
"We Are the Youth"	Jack River	Nominated
"What If"	Ciaran Gribbin	Nominated
"When a Tree Falls"	The Boy of Many Colors featuring Emily Wurramara	Nominated
"World Migratory Bird Day Virtual Choir"	Bowerbird Collective & The East Asian-Australasian Flyway Partnership	Nominated
"Worldwide Suicide"	In Hearts Wake	Nominated
"Your Country"	William Crighton featuring William Barton & Julieanne Crighton	Nominated

=== 2023 ===
In January 2023, entries were open to Australian citizens and residents who had released an original song and music video between 1 January 2020 and 28 Feb 2023.

The submitted works must: • Reference nature or an environmental issue in its lyrics, or in the visual content of its music video. • Connect us to the natural world, encourage us to reflect, or inspire us to protect the environment. • Be submitted as a music video on Youtube that is publicly available to watch and share.

Finalists were announced on 22 April 2023 (Earth Day), with public voting to open shortly after that. The winner was announced on 13 June 2023.

Title	Artist	Result
"Stoney Creek"	Xavier Rudd	Won
"Losing Wild"	Anya Anastasia	Nominated
"Smoke and Mirrors"	Beckah Amani	Nominated
"Lady Blue"	Emily Wurramara	Nominated
"Go"	Flume	Nominated
"Gentle"	Georgia Mae	Nominated
"Golden Chains"	Hazel Mei	Nominated
"Being Human"	Jen Cloher	Nominated
"Milkumana"	King Stingray	Nominated
"Singing Up Country"	Kutcha Edwards	Nominated
"Warrior"	Meraki Mae	Nominated
"Rising Seas"	Midnight Oil	Nominated
"Change Has to Come"	Mo'Ju	Nominated
"Vessel"	SheisArjuna	Nominated
"End of the World"	Sunfruits	Nominated
"Willow Tree"	Tash Sultana	Nominated
"The Godwit and Curlew"	The Bowerbird Collective	Nominated
"Back On Country"	Troy Cassar-Daley	Nominated
"Mararradj"	Wildfire Manwurrk	Nominated
"Backburner"	Wildheart	Nominated
"Forever After"	Woodes	Nominated
"Together"	Ziggy Alberts	Nominated

=== 2025 ===
In 2025, thirty songs were named as finalists for the 2025 Environmental Music Prize, a $20,000 award that recognises Australian artists using music to connect audiences with nature and inspire climate action.

Finalists were announced on 12 November 2025 and voting closed on 14 December 2025. The winner was due to be announced on 17 December, but was delayed due to the 2025 Bondi Beach shooting on 14 December with a post on the Environmental Music Prize website reading "The Prize founder and CEO is part of the Bondi community. We wish to stand with all those affected at this time, and give her time to be there for her children. We will share the winner of the 2025 Prize, and other uplifting announcements, early next year."

The Prize was announced in July 2026.

Title	Artist	Result
"Hits the Heart"	Ruby Rodgers	Won
"Power in Us"	Anderson Rocio	Nominated
"Mother Nature"	Angie McMahon	Nominated
"Down to the Sea"	Angus & Julia Stone	Nominated
"Deep Blue Sea"	Anna Lunoe	Nominated
"The Birds"	Belle Roscoe	Nominated
"This Land"	Charlie Needs Braces	Nominated
"Dirrpi Yuin Patjulinya"	Dobby	Nominated
"Feathered Thing"	Emily Barker	Nominated
"Running on Our Own"	Gailla	Nominated
"Takayna"	Goanna	Nominated
"Up Armidale Road"	Grace and Hugh (with the Nymboida Bush Fire Survivors and The Clarence Valley Conservatorium)	Nominated
"On the Way"	Hollow Coves	Nominated
"Nature's Cry"	Jack River (in collaboration with the Australian Conservation Foundation)	Nominated
"Little Finch"	Kate Mahood	Nominated
"Reflecting"	Kim Churchill & Emily Brimlow	Nominated
"Through the Trees"	King Stingray	Nominated
"What Do We Tell the Kids"	Laura Frank	Nominated
"Speak"	Magnets	Nominated
"Everything is Green"	Maxon & Like Bear	Nominated
"Yugal Yulu-gi"	Mitch Tambo	Nominated
"Tangerine"	Ocean Alley	Nominated
"Window to the Sky"	Oceanique	Nominated
"Innocence Parts 1 & 2"	Peter Garrett	Nominated
"In the Water"	Pierce Brothers	Nominated
"Lion"	Steph Strings	Nominated
"We've Got the Power"	Sunny Luwe	Nominated
"The Seed"	The Seeding	Nominated
"Sacred Ground"	Wildheart	Nominated
"Lifetime"	Woodes	Nominated
