= King Stingray =

Australian rock band

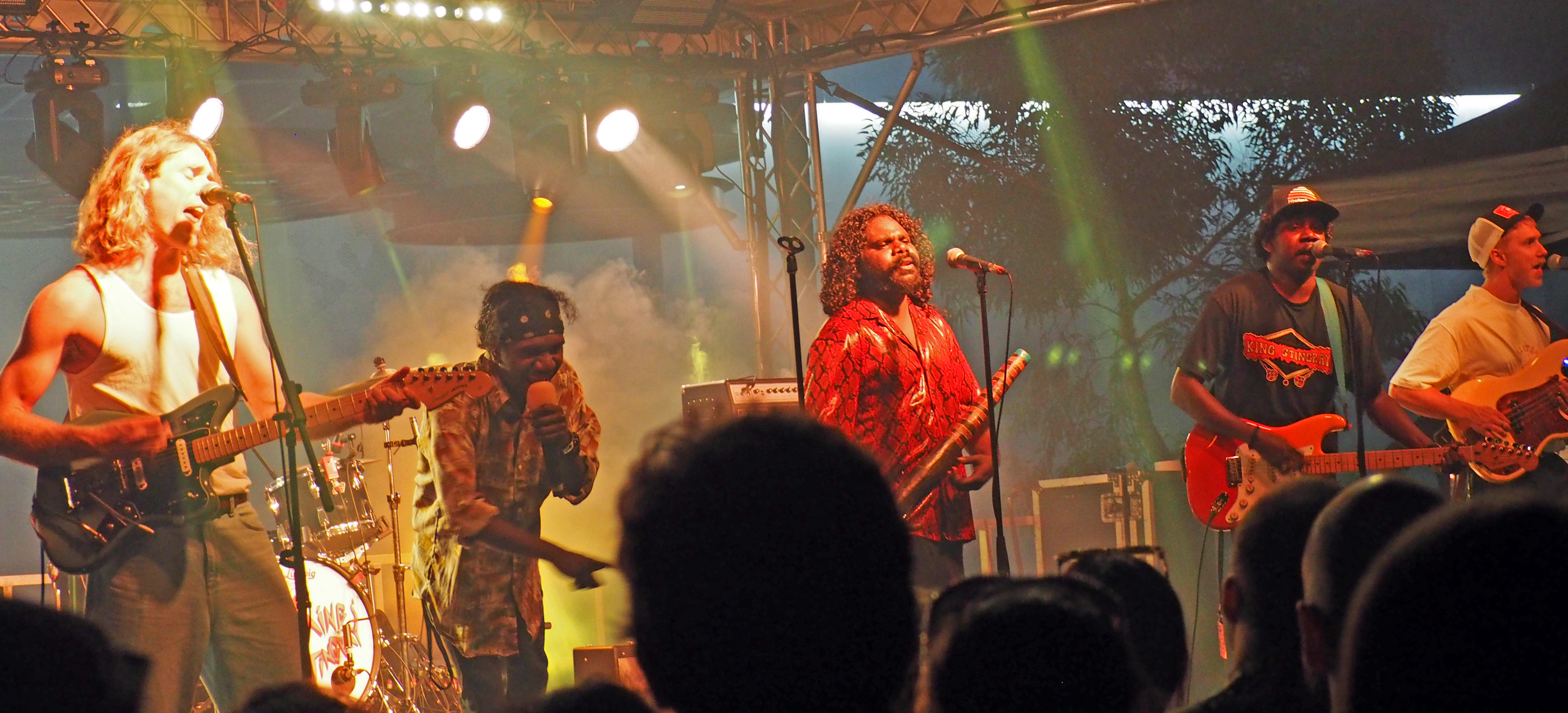
- King Stingray, April 2023

Background information
- Origin: Northeast Arnhem Land, Australia
- Genres: Indie rock; pop-rock; surf rock
- Years active: 2020–present
- Labels: Bargain Bin Records, Cooking Vinyl Australia (2021–present)
- Members: Roy Kellaway; Dimathaya Burarrwanga; Campbell Messer; Lewis Stiles; Ngalakan "Billy" Wanambi
- Past members: Yirrŋa Yunupiŋu; Yimila Gurruwiwi

King Stingray is an Australian rock band from Northeast Arnhem Land in the Northern Territory. With a sound self-described as "Yolŋu surf rock", the band perform songs with lyrics in both English and Yolŋu Matha. As of December 2025, the band consists of co-founding guitarist Roy Kellaway, vocalist and guitarist Dimathaya Burarrwanga, bassist Campbell Messer, drummer Lewis Stiles, and vocalist Ngalakan "Billy" Wanambi.

King Stingray released their debut single, "Hey Wanhaka", in October 2020, and their self-titled debut album on 5 August 2022. Its follow-up, For the Dreams, was released on 8 November 2024. The band has both won and been nominated numerous awards, including ARIA Awards, AIR Awards, and National Indigenous Music Awards.

== Origins ==
Most members of the band are from northeast Arnhem Land, in the Northern Territory of Australia.

Several of the band's founding members have known one another since childhood, and have deep roots in east Arnhem Land music history. Former lead vocalist Yirrŋa Yunupiŋu is the nephew of Dr M. Yunupiŋu, and guitarist Roy Kellaway is the son of Stuart Kellaway, who were both founding members of Yothu Yindi. The pair grew up together on the same street in the community of Yirrkala – along with their neighbour and future bandmate Dimathaya Burarrwanga, the grandson of Warumpi Band frontman George Burarrwanga. Through speaking various dialects within their community, both Yunupiŋu and Burarrwaŋa each learned how to speak a total of 17 languages. The trio, joined by bassist Campbell Messer and drummer Lewis Stiles, ultimately formed King Stingray in 2020. They signed to The Chats' Bargain Bin Records that same year.

== Career ==
The band's debut single, "Hey Wanhaka", written by Yunupiŋu and Kellaway, was released in October 2020. In January 2021, King Stingray released "Get Me Out"; a song described by Double J as "a tribute to the importance of home". According to a press statement, the song was written following a family member of the band getting lost in Melbourne when they were on tour with Yothu Yindi. The band said: "She had no phone, [and] Yolŋu style, she navigated her way back to us miraculously and we now laugh about it." Dan Condon from Double J wrote at the time that the song was "as catchy as it is stirring, and will no doubt help this new band continue to win the hearts of a broad range of music lovers." A few months later, Lewis Stiles joined the group as their official drummer, cementing the band's best-known line-up.

In August 2021, the band signed with Cooking Vinyl Australia (a partner of Sony Music) and released "Milkumana", a song described by triple j as being "about the power of passing on knowledge". The music video was filmed in the band's hometown of Yirrkala, and features tribal elders Mangatjay and Malŋay Yunupiŋu. In January 2022, both "Milkumana" and "Get Me Out" charted in the triple j Hottest 100 at number 56 and 46, respectively.

In March 2022, King Stingray released "Camp Dog". The title refers to the dogs that wander the streets of Yirrkala. The following month, the band supported Midnight Oil at the latter's final headlining show in Sydney on their Resist tour. In May 2022, King Stingray released the single "Let's Go" and announced their debut self-titled album. The album was released on 5 August 2022. In July 2022, King Stingray were featured on the cover of NME Australia for an in-depth interview feature about their debut album, conducted by Torres Strait Islander journalist and former triple j newsreader Rhianna Patrick. In the same month, they did a Like a Version cover of Coldplay's "Yellow" using a combination of the original English lyrics as well as Yolŋu Matha.

In October 2022, King Stingray released a cover of Men at Work's "Down Under" as part of a new campaign for Tourism Australia. Around this time, yidaki player Yimila Gurruwiwi became a full-time member of the band, expanding them to a six-piece. The band generated support from Australian Prime Minister Anthony Albanese at the end of 2022, who chose "Get Me Out" as his favourite song of 2022 and wore a King Stingray t-shirt on Ausmusic T-Shirt Day that same year.

In June 2023, King Stingray released "Lookin' Out". August 2023 saw the band win three AIR Awards: Best Independent Rock Album or EP, Independent Album of the Year, and Breakthrough Artist of the Year. They were also winners at the 2023 National Indigenous Music Awards and, along with Wildfire Manwurrk, were the only groups to win more than one. King Stingray picked up the Film Clip of the Year and Song of the Year awards, both for "Let's Go". In December 2023, they performed as part of the ABC's New Year's Eve concert on Sydney Harbour.

The group's second studio album, For the Dreams, was released in November 2024. Prior to its release, the band released several singles from it: "Through the Trees", "Best Bit", "Cat 5 (Cyclone)" and "Light Up the Path". The album notably featured Burarrwanga taking lead vocals on several songs, and assuming the role of co-frontman. That same year, the band appeared on the Bluey album Rug Island with a new original song, "Octopus", and also returned to the ABC studios for their second Like a Version – this time covering Royel Otis' "Oysters in My Pocket" with guest vocalist Jem Cassar-Daley. This followed a successful tour in the United States, where they supported fellow Australian rock band King Gizzard & the Lizard Wizard.

In March 2025, the band announced that founding member Yirrŋa Yunupiŋu was officially no longer part of the band, having been absent from shows and press photos since the year prior with no acknowledgment. Fellow Yolŋu musician Ngalakan Wanambi, the grandson of Yirrkala artist Naminapu Maymuru-White, was simultaneously announced as their new vocalist. From late March to early April 2025, the band undertook the For the Dreams national tour in various major cities across the country, with support from Beddy Rays and The Belair Lip Bombs. Later that year, Gurruwiwi also quietly departed from the band.

== Band members ==
=== Current ===
- Roy Kellaway – guitar, backing vocals (2020–present)
- Dimathaya "Dima" Burarrwanga – guitar, backing vocals, yiḏaki, bilma (2020–present), lead vocals (2024–present)
- Campbell Messer – bass, banjo, backing vocals (2020–present)
- Lewis Stiles – drums, backing vocals (2020–present)
- Ngalakan "Billy" Wanambi – yiḏaki, backing and lead vocals, bilma (2025–present)

=== Former ===
- Yirrŋa Yunupiŋu – lead vocals, bilma (2020–2025; inactive 2024–2025)
- Yimila Gurruwiwi – yiḏaki, backing vocals (2022–2025)

== Discography ==
=== Studio albums ===
Title	Details	Peak chart positions
Title	Details	AUS
King Stingray	Released: 5 August 2022; Label: Cooking Vinyl Australia; Format: Streaming, vinyl, CD, digital download	6
For the Dreams	Released: 8 November 2024; Label: Cooking Vinyl Australia; Format: Streaming, vinyl, CD, digital download	51

=== Singles ===
List of singles
Title	Year	Album
"Hey Wanhaka"	2020	King Stingray
"Get Me Out"	2021	King Stingray
"Milkumana"	2021	King Stingray
"Camp Dog"	2022	King Stingray
"Let's Go"	2022	King Stingray
"Yellow" (Like a Version)	2022	Non-album single (Note: Later included on the 2025 compilation Triple J's Best Australian Like A Version)
"Lupa"	2022	King Stingray
"Down Under (Under One Sun)"	2022	Non-album single
"Lookin' Out"	2023	For the Dreams
"Through the Trees"	2024	For the Dreams
"Best Bit"	2024	For the Dreams
"Octopus" (with Bluey)	2024	Rug Island
"Cat 5 (Cyclone)"	2024	For the Dreams
"Light Up the Path"	2024	For the Dreams
"Southerly"	2024	For the Dreams
"Oysters in My Pocket" (Like a Version) (with Jem Cassar-Daley)	2024	Non-album single
"Day Off"	2024	For the Dreams

== Awards and nominations ==
=== AIR Awards ===
The Australian Independent Record Awards (commonly known informally as AIR Awards) is an annual awards night to recognise, promote and celebrate the success of Australia's Independent Music sector.

Year	Nominee / work	Award	Result	Ref.
2022	"Get Me Out"	Independent Song of the Year	Nominated	
2023	King Stingray	Independent Album of the Year	Won	
2023	King Stingray	Best Independent Rock Album or EP	Won	
2023	"Camp Dog"	Independent Song of the Year	Nominated	
2023	King Stingray	Breakthrough Independent Artist of the Year	Won	
2025	For the Dreams	Independent Album of the Year	Nominated	
2025	For the Dreams	Best Independent Rock Album or EP	Nominated	

=== APRA Awards ===
The APRA Awards are presented annually from 1982 by the Australasian Performing Right Association (APRA), "honouring composers and songwriters". They commenced in 1982.

Year	Nominee / work	Award	Result	Ref.
2022	"Get Me Out" (Roy Kellaway & Yirrŋa Yunupiŋu)	Song of the Year	Shortlisted	
2022	"Milkumana" (Roy Kellaway & Yirrŋa Yunupiŋu)	Song of the Year	Shortlisted	
2023	"Lupa" (Roy Kellaway & Yirrŋa Yunupiŋu)	Song of the Year	Nominated	
2023	"Milkumana" (Roy Kellaway & Yirrŋa Yunupiŋu)	Most Performed Rock Work of the Year	Nominated	
2023	Roy Kellaway & Yirrŋa Yunupiŋu	Breakthrough Songwriter of the Year	Nominated	
2024	"Lookin' Out" (King Stingray)	Song of the Year	Shortlisted	
2024	"Lookin' Out" (King Stingray)	Most Performed Rock Work	Nominated	
2025	"Through the Trees" (King Stingray)	Song of the Year	Shortlisted	
2025	"Through the Trees" (King Stingray)	Most Performed Rock Work	Won	
2026	"Light Up the Path" (King Stingray)	Song of the Year	Shortlisted	
2026	"Southerly" (King Stingray)	Most Performed Rock Work	Nominated	

=== ARIA Music Awards ===
The ARIA Music Awards is an annual awards ceremony that recognises excellence, innovation, and achievement across all genres of Australian music.

Year	Nominee / work	Award	Result	Ref.
2022	King Stingray	Album of the Year	Nominated	
2022	King Stingray	Best Group	Nominated	
2022	King Stingray	Michael Gudinski Breakthrough Artist	Won	
2022	King Stingray	Best Rock Album	Nominated	
2022	Kayla Flett, Gabi Coulthurst & Dimathaya Burarrwanga for King Stingray – King Stingray	Best Cover Art	Nominated	
2023	Tourism Australia: Come and Say G'day (M&C Saatchi Sydney)	Best Use of an Australian Recording in an Advertisement (duration of 2 minutes or less)	Nominated	
2023	Tourism Australia: G'day Short Film (M&C Saatchi Sydney)	Best Use of an Australian Recording in an Advertisement (over 2 minutes duration)	Nominated	
2023	Sam Brumby for King Stingray – "Lookin' Out"	Best Video	Nominated	
2023	That's Where I Wanna Be Tour	Best Australian Live Act	Nominated	
2024	King Stingray - Regional Run 2024	Best Australian Live Act	Nominated	
2025	For the Dreams	Best Rock Album	Nominated	

=== Australian Music Prize ===
The Australian Music Prize (the AMP) is an annual award of $30,000 given to an Australian band or solo artist in recognition of the merit of an album released during the year of award. It exists to discover, reward and promote new Australian music of excellence.

Year	Nominee / work	Award	Result	Ref.
2022	King Stingray	Australian Music Prize	Won	

=== Environmental Music Prize ===
The Environmental Music Prize is a quest to find a theme song to inspire action on climate and conservation. It commenced in 2022.

Year	Nominee / work	Award	Result	Ref.
2022	"Hey Wanhaka"	Environmental Music Prize	Nominated	
2023	"Milkumana"	Environmental Music Prize	Nominated	
2025	"Through the Trees"	Environmental Music Prize	Nominated	

=== J Awards ===
The J Awards are an annual series of Australian music awards that were established by the Australian Broadcasting Corporation's youth-focused radio station Triple J. The J Awards commenced in 2005.

Year	Nominee / work	Award	Result	Ref.
2021	"Milkumana" (directed by King Stingray and Sam Brumby)	Australian Video of the Year	Nominated	
2021	King Stingray	Unearthed Artist of the Year	Won	
2022	King Stingray	Australian Album of the Year	Nominated	
2022	King Stingray	Double J Artist of the Year	Nominated	
2023	King Stingray	Australian Live Act of the Year	Nominated	

=== National Indigenous Music Awards ===
The National Indigenous Music Awards recognise excellence, innovation and leadership among Aboriginal and Torres Strait Islander musicians from throughout Australia. They commenced in 2004.

Year	Nominee / work	Award	Result	Ref.
2021	King Stingray	New Artist of the Year	Nominated	
2022	King Stingray	Artist of the Year	Nominated	
2022	"Milkumana"	Song of the Year	Won	
2023	"Let's Go"	Song of the Year	Won	
2023	"Let's Go"	Film Clip of the Year	Won	
2024	King Stingray	Artist of the Year	Nominated	
2025	King Stingray	Artist of the Year	Nominated	
2025	For the Dreams	Album of the Year	Nominated	
2025	"Day Off"	Film Clip of the Year	Nominated	

=== National Live Music Awards ===
The National Live Music Awards (NLMAs) commenced in 2016 to recognise contributions to the live music industry in Australia.

Year	Nominee / work	Award	Result	Ref.
2023	King Stingray	Best Live Act	Nominated	
2023	King Stingray	Best Live Act in the NT	Won	
2023	Yirrŋa Yunupiŋu (King Stingray)	Best Live Voice	Nominated	
2023	Yirrŋa Yunupiŋu (King Stingray)	Best Live Voice in the NT	Nominated	
2023	Lewis Stiles (King Stingray)	Best Live Drummer	Nominated	
2023	Roy Kellaway (King Stingray)	Best Live Guitarist	Nominated	

=== Rolling Stone Australia Awards ===
The Rolling Stone Australia Awards are awarded annually in January or February by the Australian edition of Rolling Stone magazine for outstanding contributions to popular culture in the previous year.

Year	Nominee / work	Award	Result	Ref.
2022	King Stingray	Best New Artist	Won	

=== Vanda & Young Global Songwriting Competition ===
The Vanda & Young Global Songwriting Competition is an annual competition that "acknowledges great songwriting whilst supporting and raising money for Nordoff-Robbins" and is coordinated by Albert Music and APRA AMCOS. It commenced in 2009.

Year	Nominee / work	Award	Result	Ref.
2022	"Milkumana"	Vanda & Young Global Songwriting Competition	1st	
2022	"Camp Dog"	Vanda & Young Global Songwriting Competition	3rd	
