= For the Dreams =

Studio album by King Stingray
- Released: 8 November 2024
- Studio: El Rancho (Federal); Roy's house; The Grove (Central Coast); Frying Pan (Hobart); Inventions (Footscray)
- Length: 41:11
- Label: Cooking Vinyl Australia
- Producer: Roy Kellaway

King Stingray chronology
King Stingray (2022)	For the Dreams (2024)

Singles from For the Dreams
- 1. "Lookin' Out" Released: 26 June 2023; 2. "Through the Trees" Released: 22 March 2024; 3. "Best Bit" Released: 31 May 2024; 4. "Cat 5 (Cyclone)" Released: 23 August 2024; 5. "Light Up the Path" Released: 11 October 2024; 6. "Southerly" Released: 8 November 2024; 7. "Day Off" Released: December 2024

For the Dreams is the second studio album from Australian rock group, King Stingray. It was released on 8 November 2024 through Cooking Vinyl Australia.

Upon announcement on 22 August 2024, the group described the album as a "joyous celebration of life and the planet" saying, "Nothing's changed in the sense that we're still who we are, we're still playing music and enjoying things, but what I think is different about this one is there's a little bit more lived experience."

The album will be supported with an Australian tour, commencing in March 2025.

At the AIR Awards of 2025, the album was nominated for Independent Album of the Year and Best Independent Rock Album or EP.

At the National Indigenous Music Awards 2025 the album was nominated for Album of the Year.

At the 2025 ARIA Music Awards, the album was nominated for ARIA Award for Best Rock Album.

== Reception ==
Professional ratings
Review scores
Source	Rating
The Guardian	4/5 stars
Rolling Stone Australia	4.5/5 stars

Andrew Stafford from The Guardian said "For the Dreams may as well be titled King Stingray II. The themes are practically identical: the joys of being on country, slowing down [and] chilling out. The wind, the sun, the rain, the moon, the tides. In that sense, there is little development from their debut, musically or lyrically. King Stingray have simply stuck to what they're already exceptional at. For the Dreams teems with hooks, the choruses are massive and the sound is universally bright, up-tempo and uplifting. And there are no bad vibes, anywhere."

== Track listing ==
All tracks are written by Dimathaya Burarrwanga, Roy Kellaway, Yimila Gurruwiwi, Campbell Messer, and Lewi Stiles.

For the Dreams track listing
No.	Title	Length
1.	"Light Up the Path"	3:58
2.	"Best Bits"	4:02
3.	"Southerly"	3:45
4.	"Lookin' Out"	3:47
5.	"Scoreboard"	1:32
6.	"Nostalgic"	4:26
7.	"Day Off"	2:47
8.	"Through the Trees"	3:08
9.	"Soon As"	4:01
10.	"What's the Hurry?"	3:51
11.	"Come to the Surface"	2:12
12.	"Cat 5 (Cyclone)"	3:42
Total length:		41:11

== Personnel ==
King Stingray

- Dimathaya Burarrwanga – lead vocals, front cover drawing
- Yimila Gurruwiwi – didgeridoo
- Roy Kellaway – electric guitar, production, engineering
- Campbell Messer – bass guitar
- Lewis Stiles – drums
- Yirrŋa Yunupiŋu – lead vocals

Additional contributors

- Justin Stanley – additional production, mixing
- Chris Collins – additional production, engineering
- Luke Postill – additional production, engineering
- Ryan Fallis – engineering
- Mathias Dowle - engineering, additional instrumentation
- Tas Wilson – artwork
- Kris Keogh – front cover drawing
- Maclay Heriot – photos

== Charts ==
Chart performance for For the Dreams
Chart (2024)	Peak position
Australian Albums (ARIA)	51

== Release history ==
Release history and formats for For the Dreams
Region	Date	Format	Label	Catalogue
Various	8 November 2024	CD; digital download; streaming	Cooking Vinyl Australia	CVCD152
Australia	8 November 2024	LP	Cooking Vinyl Australia	CVLP152A
