= Lookin' Out =

2023 single by King Stingray

Single by King Stingray

from the album For the Dreams
- Released: 26 June 2023
- Length: 3:47
- Label: Cooking Vinyl Australia
- Songwriter: Roy Kellaway
- Producer: Roy Kellaway

King Stingray singles chronology
"Down Under (Under One Sun)" (2022)	"Lookin' Out" (2023)	"Through the Trees" (2024)

Music video
- "Lookin' Out" on YouTube

"Lookin' Out" is a song by Australian rock group King Stingray, which was released on 26 June 2023. It is the lead single for the band's second studio album, For the Dreams (2024).

The song is inspired by the group's experience reflecting on the beauty of nature and the feeling of being awestruck at the magnificence of Mother Earth.

In a statement, guitarist Roy Kellaway said "We have no idea what our future holds, but if we can find a way to work together we’ll be on the right track. We are a band from a small place and we’re singing about big things."

At the 2023 ARIA Music Awards, the song's video was nominated for Best Video. At the APRA Music Awards of 2024, the song was shortlisted for Song of the Year and was nominated for Most Performed Rock Work.

== Music video ==
The Sam Brumby directed video was released on 26 June 2023. It featured animations by Reid McManus and additional footage by Matt McLean. The video shows some behind-the-scenes footage from recent tours, and shots of the band's hometown of Yirrkala in East Arnhem Region.

== Reception ==
Jules LeFevre from Music Feeds said "The new cut is classic King Stingray: a propulsive, chugging bite of lo-fi rock. " Conor Lochrie from Rolling Stone Australia said "'Lookin' Out' beautifully builds on the sterling showing from King Stingray on their 2022 debut album, a record that led Rolling Stone AU/NZ to hail them as 'one of the most exciting rock bands to emerge from this country in a generation'."

Mary Varvaris from The Music said "Utilising the didgeridoo alongside guitars and drums, 'Lookin' Out' is Yolŋu surf rock at its finest."

Zoë Radas wrote in Stack magazine "It's a thumping, classic rock gem, with a gorgeous video that incorporates tour footage from the band's mammoth last 12 months, along with imagery from the Great Barrier Reef, and King Stingray's own hometown of Yirrkala. An absolute stunner from the boys who just keep lifting the bar."
