= APRA Music Awards of 2025 =

Australian music award ceremony

- Date: 30 April 2025
- Location: Melbourne Town Hall, Melbourne, Australia
- Hosted by: Zan Rowe

Highlights
- Most wins: Kevin Parker (2)
- Most nominations: Styalz Fuego (4)
- Website: apraamcos.com.au/awards/

The APRA Music Awards of 2025 are the 43th annual series, known as the APRA Awards. The awards are given in a series of categories in three divisions and in separate ceremonies throughout the year: the APRA Music Awards, Art Music Awards and Screen Music Awards.

The 20 songs shortlisted for Song of the Year were announced on 6 February 2025. Genre categories were announced on 2 April, with winners announced at the awards ceremony at Melbourne Town Hall on 30 April.

== APRA Music Awards ==
=== Ted Albert Award for Outstanding Services to Australian Music ===
- Kylie Minogue

=== APRA Song of the Year ===
Title and/or artist	Writer(s)	Publisher(s)	Result	Ref.
"One of Your Girls" by Troye Sivan	Troye Sivan, Oscar Görres, Brett McLaughlin	Universal Music Publishing, Warner Chappell Music, Sony Music Publishing	Nominated	
"The Second Act" by Missy Higgins	Missy Higgins	Mushroom Music Publishing	Nominated	
"Through the Trees" by King Stingray	Theo Dimathaya Burarrwanga, Roy Kellaway, Campbell Messer, Yirrnga Gotjiringu Yunupingu, Yimila Gurruwiwi, Lewi Stiles	Sony Music Publishing	Nominated	
"U Should Not Be Doing That" by Amyl and the Sniffers	Declan Mehrtens, Fergus Romer, Amy Taylor, Bryce Wilson		Won	
"Won't Stop" by 3% (featuring Jessica Mauboy)	Danzal Baker, Andrew Burford, Madeline Crabtree, Corey Webster, Dallas Woods	Sony Music Publishing, Kobalt Music Publishing	Nominated	

=== Songwriter of the Year ===
Writer(s)	Result	Ref.
Troye Sivan	Won	

=== Emerging Songwriter of the Year ===
Writer(s)	Publisher(s)	Result	Ref.
Emily Wurramara	Mushroom Music Publishing	Nominated	
Grace Cummings		Nominated	
Jem Cassar-Daley	Mushroom Music Publishing	Nominated	
Miss Kaninna		Nominated	
Otis Pavlovic & Royel Maddell (Royel Otis)	Kobalt Music Publishing o.b.o. Ourness Songs	Won	

=== Most Performed Australian Work ===
Title and/or artist	Writer(s)	Publisher(s)	Result	Ref.
"Dreaming" by Tones and I	Toni Watson, Sam Nelson Harris	Warner Chappell Music	Nominated	
"Give You Love" by Jessica Mauboy (featuring Jason Derulo)	Shannon Busch, Stephen Mowat, Blessing Offor, Styalz Fuego, Rudy Sandapa	Concord Music Publishing ANZ, Mushroom Music Publishing, SHOUT! Music Publishing, Universal Music Publishing	Nominated	
"Got Me Started" by Troye Sivan	Troye Sivan, Styalz Fuego, Jack Glass, Christopher Stracey, Ian Kirkpatrick, Brett McLaughlin, Tayla Parx	Universal Music Publishing, Warner Chappell Music, Sony Music Publishing	Nominated	
"Houdini" by Dua Lipa	Kevin Parker, Dua Lipa, Caroline Ailin, Daniel Harle, Tobias Jesso Jr.	Sony Music Publishing, Warner Chappell Music Publishing, Universal Music Publishing	Won	
"Saving Up" by Dom Dolla	Dominic Matheson, Clementine Douglas, Toby Scott, Caitlin Stubbs	Sony Music Publishing, Mushroom Music Publishing, Kobalt Music Publishing	Nominated	

=== Most Performed Australian Work Overseas ===
Title	Writer(s)	Result	Ref.
"Unstoppable" by Sia	Sia Furler, Christopher Braide	Won	

=== Most Performed Alternative Work ===
Title and/or artist	Writer(s)	Publisher(s)	Result	Ref.
"Born in the Wrong Time" by Joan & The Giants	Aaron Birch, Grace Newton-Wordsworth, Dylan Ollivierre	BMG	Nominated	
"Good Mood" by The Rubens	Scott Baldwin, Elliott Margin, Sam Margin, Zaac Margin, William Zeglis, Sarah Aarons	Mushroom Music Publishing o.b.o. Ivy League, Sony Music Publishing	Nominated	
"Paradise" by Coterie	Brandford Fisher, Conrad Fisher, Joshua Fisher, Tyler Fisher, Robby De Sá	Concord Music Publishing ANZ, Sony Music Publishing	Won	
"Pedestal" by Lime Cordiale	Louis Leimbach, Oli Leimbach, Felix Bornholdt, Dave Hammer, Thomas McDonald, Nick Sarazen	Universal Music Publishing o.b.o. Chugg Music, Kobalt Music Publishing, ST Music, Warner Chappell Music	Nominated	
"The Second Act" by Missy Higgins	Missy Higgins	Mushroom Music Publishing	Nominated	

=== Most Performed Blues & Roots Work ===
Title and/or artist	Writer(s)	Publisher(s)	Result	Ref.
"Givin' it Up" by South Summit	Nathan Osborne, Isaiah Reuben, Nehemiah Reuben, Fynn Samorali, Joshua Trindall		Nominated	
"High Times" by Xavier Rudd	Xavier Rudd	Sony Music Publishing	Nominated	
"New Love" by Ziggy Alberts	Ziggy Alberts	Kobalt Music Publishing	Won	
"Stand On My Shoulders" by Dallas Frasca	Dallas Frasca, Andrew Baldwin		Nominated	
"Warm Love" by Sweet Talk	David Turner, Sören Walker		Nominated	

=== Most Performed Country Work ===
Title and/or artist	Writer(s)	Publisher(s)	Result	Ref.
"Call It a Day" by Zac & George	George Goodfellow, Zac Roddy, Nicole Miller, Kyle Winski		Nominated	
"Good Things" by Kaylee Bell	Kaylee Bell, Michael De Lorenzis, Melanie Dyer, Michael Paynter	Mushroom Music Publishing	Nominated	
"Mayday" by Casey Barnes	Casey Barnes, Danielle Blakey, Morgan Evans		Nominated	
"Some Things Never Change" by James Johnston and Zac & George	James Johnston, George Goodfellow, Zac Roddy		Nominated	
"Take Forever (Hally's Song)" by Cooper Alan	Kylie Sackley, Timothy Cooper, Justin Morgan	I Love You More Music Worldwide, BMG, SHOUT! Music Publishing	Won	

=== Most Performed Dance/Electronic Work ===
Title and/or artist	Writer(s)	Publisher(s)	Result	Ref.
"AEIOU" by Pnau and Empire of the Sun	Nick Littlemore, Peter Mayes, Luke Steele, Richard Boardman, Pablo Bowman	Universal Music Publishing, Warner Chappell Music, Kobalt Music Publishing	Nominated	
"Atmosphere" by Fisher & Kita Alexander	Kita Alexander, Konstantin Kersting, Thoman Earnshaw, Dominik Felsmann, Paul Fisher	Kobalt Music Publishing, Concord Music Publishing ANZ, Origin Music Publishing	Nominated	
"Changes" by Empire of the Sun	Nick Littlemore, Luke Steele, Salem Al Fakir, Magnus Lidehäll, Vincent Pontare, Pontus Winnberg	Universal Music Publishing, Warner Chappell Music, Kobalt Music Publishing	Nominated	
"Lifetime" by Tobiahs Fakhri	Tobiahs Fakhri, Timothy Maxey, John Scherer	Mushroom Music Publishing, Concord Music Publishing ANZ	Nominated	
"Saving Up" by Dom Dolla	Dominic Matheson, Clementine Douglas, Toby Scott, Caitlin Stubbs	Sony Music Publishing, Mushroom Music Publishing, Kobalt Music Publishing	Won	

=== Most Performed Hard Rock / Heavy Metal Work ===
Title and/or artist	Writer(s)	Publisher(s)	Result	Ref.
"Dante" by Northlane	Marcus Bridge, Jonathon Deiley, Nic Pettersen, Joshua Smith, Maraya Vavasis	Mushroom Music Publishing o.b.o. UNIFIED	Nominated	
"Epitaph" by Make Them Suffer	Sean Harmanis, Nicholas McLernon, Jordan Mather, Alexandra Reade, Jeff Dunne	Cooking Vinyl Publishing	Won	
"Nightmare" by Polaris	Daniel Furnari, Jamie Hails, Rick Schneider, Ryan Siew, Jacob Steinhauser	Kobalt Music Publishing	Nominated	
"Real Life Love" by Speed	Joshua Clayton, Aaron Siow, Jem Siow, Kane Vardon, Dennis Vichidvongsa	Warner Chappell Music	Nominated	
"Sirens" by Windwaker	Jesse Crofts, Liam Guinane, Christopher Lalic, Connor Robins, Indey Salvestro	Cooking Vinyl Publishing	Nominated	

=== Most Performed Hip Hop / Rap Work ===
Title and/or artist	Writer(s)	Publisher(s)	Result	Ref.
"Anxiety" by Sleepy Hallow (featuring Doechii)	Wally De Backer, Luiz Bonfá, Bennie Briggman, Michael Briggman, Sleepy Hallow|Tegan Chambers, Jaylah Hickmon, Eric Johnson, Karel Jorge, Ernesto Shaw, Johnathan Scott, Jeremy Soto	Origin Music Publishing, Warner Chappell Music, Sony Music Publishing, Universal Music Publishing	Nominated	
"Bandit" by Don Toliver	Kevin Parker, Edgard Herrera, Sean Reid, Cody Rounds, Danny Snodgrass, Caleb Toliver		Nominated	
"Boys Light Up" by ChillinIT	Blake Turnell, James Reyne, Malik Sanders	Mushroom Music Publishing, Warner Chappell Music, Kobalt Music Publishing	Nominated	
"Fall Back" by Lithe	Josiah Ramel, Omid Khasrawy	Concord Music Publishing ANZ o.b.o. Boss Level	Won	
"Get This Money" by Hooligan Hefs	Simeona Malagamaalii, Cooper Bedford, Nepomsein Irakunda, Roshanth Karunakara, Ilir Rusiti	Mushroom Music Publishing, Killphonic Rights	Nominated	

=== Most Performed Pop Work ===
Title and/or artist	Writer(s)	Publisher(s)	Result	Ref.
"Dreaming" by Tones and I	Toni Watson, Sam Nelson Harris	Warner Chappell Music	Nominated	
"Gimme Love" by Sia	Sia Furler, Jesse Shatkin	Sony Music Publishing	Nominated	
"Give You Love" by Jessica Mauboy (featuring Jason Derulo)	Shannon Busch, Stephen Mowat, Blessing Offor, Styalz Fuego, Rudy Sandapa	Concord Music Publishing ANZ, Mushroom Music Publishing, SHOUT! Music Publishing, Universal Music Publishing	Nominated	
"Got Me Started" by Troye Sivan	Troye Sivan, Styalz Fuego, [Jack Glass, Christopher Stracey, Ian Kirkpatrick, Brett McLaughlin, Tayla Parx	Universal Music Publishing, Warner Chappell Music, Sony Music Publishing	Nominated	
"Houdini" by Dua Lipa	Kevin Parker, Dua Lipa, Caroline Ailin, Daniel Harle, Tobias Jesso Jr.	Sony Music Publishing, Warner Chappell Music Publishing, Universal Music Publishing	Won	

=== Most Performed R&B / Soul Work ===
Title and/or artist	Writer(s)	Publisher(s)	Result	Ref.
"Ground" by Khalid	Mark Landon, Khalid Robinson, Aidan Rodriguez	Concord Music Publishing ANZ, Sony Music Publishing, Aidan Rodrigeuz	Nominated	
"Kobe Beef" by Forest Claudette	Kobe Hamilton-Reeves, Alexander Tirheimer		Nominated	
"Magiq" by Youngn Lipz	Filipo Faaoloii, Aayan Ahmed		Nominated	
"Small Change" by Don West	Don West, Nathan Hawes	Universal Music Publishing	Nominated	
"Space" by Kaiit	Kaiit Waup, Jake Amy, Anthony Liddell, Jaydean Miranda, Justin Smith		Won	

=== Most Performed Rock Work ===
Title and/or artist	Writer(s)	Publisher(s)	Result	Ref.
"Be Like You" by Dune Rats	Michael Bylund-Cloonan, Brett Jansch, Daniel Moffitt	Sony Music Publishing	Nominated	
"Lion" by Birds of Tokyo	Ian Berney, Ian Kenny, Glenn Sarangapany, Adam Spark, Adam Weston	Mushroom Music Publishing	Nominated	
"Salt" by Teen Jesus and the Jean Teasers	Scarlett McKahey, Anna Ryan, Jaida Stephenson, Neve Van Boxsel	Warner Chappell Music	Nominated	
"The First Time" by Eskimo Joe	Stuart MacLeod, Joel Quartermain, Kav Temperley	Mushroom Music Publishing	Nominated	
"Through The Trees" by King Stingray	Theo Dimathaya Burarrwanga, Roy Kellaway, Campbell Messer, Yirrŋa Gotjiringu Yunupingu, Yimila Gurruwiwi, Lewis Stiles	Sony Music Publishing	Won	

=== Most Performed International Work ===
Title and/or artist	Writer(s)	Publisher(s)	Result	Ref.
"A Bar Song (Tipsy)" by Shaboozey	Collins Chibueze, Nevin Sastry, Sean Cook, Jerrell Jones, Mark Williams	Warner Chappell Music / Sony Music Publishing* / Kobalt Music Publishing^ / Universal Music Publishing	Nominated	
"Beautiful Things" by Benson Boone	Benson Boone, Jack LaFrantz, Evan Blair	Warner Chappell Music, Sony Music Publishing, Kobalt Music Publishing	Nominated	
"Espresso" by Sabrina Carpenter	Sabrina Carpenter, Amy Allen, Julian Bunetta, Steph Jones	Universal Music Publishing, Warner Chappell Music, Mushroom Music Publishing	Nominated	
"Greedy" by Tate McRae	Tate McRae, Amy Allen, Jasper Harris, Ryan Tedder	Sony Music Publishing, Warner Chappell Music, Concord Music Publishing ANZ	Won	
"Lovin on Me" by Jack Harlow	Jackman Harlow, Ozan Yildirim, Sean Momberger, Nik Frascona Nickie Pabón, Delbert Greer, Reginald Nelton	Sony Music Publishing, Warner Chappell Music, Universal Music Publishing, Kobalt Music Publishing	Nominated	
