= Let's Go (King Stingray song) =

2022 song

Single by King Stingray

from the album King Stingray
- Released: 14 June 2022
- Genre: Indie rock
- Length: 4:00
- Label: Cooking Vinyl Australia
- Songwriters: Yirrnga Gotjiringu Yunupingu; Roy Kellaway; Stuart Kellaway
- Producer: Roy Kellaway

King Stingray singles chronology
"Camp Dog" (2022)	"Let's Go" (2022)	"Lupa" (2022)

"Let's Go" is a song by Australian rock band King Stingray, released on 14 June 2022 by Cooking Vinyl Australia as the fifth single from the band's self-titled debut album. The song and its music video won two National Indigenous Music Awards in 2023.

== Release and music video ==
The song was released on 14 June 2022 by Cooking Vinyl Australia as the fifth single from their self-titled debut album. It came with a music video directed by Sam Brumby. The video consists of road trip footage on the Central Arnhem Highway, inspired by real life road trips the band took on the same road, as well as footage of the band playing in their jam space and at festivals. In a press release, the band's guitarist Roy Kellaway called the highway "the backbone of good times", saying that "Whether it's packing up the Troopy [Toyota Troopcarrier] with dusty, half-broken band equipment and driving 12 hours to Darwin for a gig, or just going bush to enjoy the great outdoors with our loved ones and friends... the Central Arnhem Highway was the big road to fun times for us growing up, and still is to this day."

== Promotion ==
The band performed the song live, alongside a cover of Coldplay's "Yellow", for Triple J's Like a Version show.

== Style ==
The song consists of an indie rock take on the band's usual "loose and jammy style", with the inclusion of didgeridoo and psychedelic rock influence. The song's chorus centers the lyric "Central Arnhem highway on my mind".

== Reception ==
In an album review Ellie Robinson from NME said "'Let's Go' pays tribute to the outback road that links it to the rest of Australia" calling the song the "album highlight" saying "where the sharp clack of the bilma and low rumbling of the yidaki make the twangy, wah-flourished bridge feel 10 times as intoxicating."

=== Awards ===
Awards for "Let's Go"
Year	Organisation	Award	Status	Ref.
2023	National Indigenous Music Awards	Song of the Year	Won	
2023	National Indigenous Music Awards	Film Clip of the Year	Won	

== Personnel ==
- Yirrnga Gotjiringu Yunupingu – lead vocals, composer
- Roy Kellaway – producer, composer
- Stuart Kellaway – composer
- Dimathaya Burarrwanga – backing vocals
