= King Stingray (album) =

Studio album by King Stingray
- Released: 5 August 2022
- Recorded: Northern Territory, Brisbane, Byron Bay
- Length: 35:02
- Label: Cooking Vinyl Australia
- Producer: Roy Kellaway

King Stingray chronology
| King Stingray (2022) | For the Dreams (2024) |

Singles from King Stingray
- 1. "Hey Wanhaka" Released: 14 October 2020; 2. "Get Me Out" Released: 18 January 2021; 3. "Milkumana" Released: 19 August 2021; 4. "Camp Dog" Released: 15 March 2022; 5. "Let's Go" Released: 14 June 2022; 6. "Lupa" Released: 5 August 2022

King Stingray is the debut studio album from Australian rock group, King Stingray. It was released on 5 August 2022 and debuted at number 6 on the ARIA Charts.

Music Feeds said, "Their music combines classic and contemporary rock influences with the ancient tradition of manikay (song/songlines), which dates back tens of thousands of years."

At the 2022 ARIA Music Awards, the album was nominated for Album of the Year, Best Group, Best Rock Album, Breakthrough Artist – Release and Best Cover Art. The album won the 2022 Australian Music Prize, and was nominated for Australian Album of the Year at the 2022 J Awards. At the AIR Awards of 2023, the album won Independent Album of the Year and Best Independent Rock Album or EP.

== Critical reception ==
Professional ratings
Review scores
| Source | Rating |
|---|---|
| NME | 5/5 stars |
| The Guardian | 4/5 stars |
| Rolling Stone Australia | 5/5 stars |

Andrew Stafford from The Guardian called the album "irresistibly joyful" saying "With Yothu Yindi in their bloodlines, the band have delivered a hooky and uptempo first album with a sound that's all their own."

James Di Fabrizio from Rolling Stone Australia said "King Stingray may be one of the most exciting rock bands to emerge from this country in a generation." Di Fabrizio added "Each track is a heady exploration of rhythm, psych and storytelling [and] come together like puzzle pieces, showcasing the beauty and community of the place they call home — the incomparable Arnhem Land."

Al Newstead from Triple J said it "feels like an instant Australian classic", saying "perfectly fusing contemporary rock with Yolŋu manikay, King Stingray's fun, spirited first album is a captivating ode to country and community." The album topped the Double J 50 best albums of the year list.

== Track listing ==
All tracks are written by Jerome Gotjirringu Yunupiŋu and Roy Kellaway.

King Stingray track listing
| No. | Title | Length |
|---|---|---|
| 1. | "Lupa" | 3:15 |
| 2. | "Hey Wanhaka" | 3:57 |
| 3. | "Get Me Out" | 4:03 |
| 4. | "Let's Go" | 4:00 |
| 5. | "Raypirri" | 2:39 |
| 6. | "Milkumana" | 3:07 |
| 7. | "Sweet Arnhem Land" | 3:21 |
| 8. | "Malk Mirri Wayin" | 3:25 |
| 9. | "Camp Dog" | 3:39 |
| 10. | "Life Goes On" | 3:36 |
| Total length: | | 35:02 |

== Charts ==
Chart performance for King Stingray
| Chart (2022) | Peak position |
|---|---|
| Australian Albums (ARIA) | 6 |

== Release history ==
Release history and formats for King Stingray
| Region | Date | Format | Edition(s) | Label | Catalogue |
|---|---|---|---|---|---|
| Various | 5 August 2022 | CD; digital download; streaming | Standard | Cooking Vinyl Australia | CVCD112 |
| Australia | 11 November 2022 | LP | Exclusive Opaque Yellow | Cooking Vinyl Australia | CVLP112B |
| Australia | 4 August 2023 | LP (repress) | Orange | Cooking Vinyl Australia | CVLP112E |
