= King of Conflict =

Studio album by The Virginmarys
- Released: 4 February 2013
- Recorded: Chapel Studios, Lincolnshire, 2011-2012
- Genre: Hard rock, alternative rock, psychedelic rock
- Length: 54:27
- Label: Cooking Vinyl (UK, Europe); Wind Up Records (U.S.)
- Producer: Toby Jepson

The Virginmarys chronology
Cast the First Stone (mini-album) (2010)	King of Conflict (2013)	Divides (2016)

King of Conflict is the debut album by British rock band The Virginmarys, released on 4 February 2013 on Cooking Vinyl records in Europe; and 12 February 2013 on Wind Up Records in North America.

Professional ratings
Review scores
Source	Rating
Classic Rock	8/10 stars
Kerrang!	4/5 stars
Metal Hammer	8/10 stars
MusicOMH	4/5 stars
No Ripcord	7/10 stars
Popmatters	7/10 stars

== Track listing ==
All lyrics are written by Ally Dickaty; all music is composed by Ally Dickaty, Danny Dolan and Matt Rose, except where noted

No.	Title	Writer(s)	Length
1.	"Dead Man's Shoes"		3:32
2.	"Portrait of Red"		3:30
3.	"Just a Ride"		3:16
4.	"Out of Mind"		3:44
5.	"Bang Bang Bang"	Dickaty, Dolan, Rose, Chris Birdsall	4:10
6.	"Lost Weekend"		3:15
7.	"Running for My Life"		4:12
8.	"Dressed to Kill"		3:49
9.	"My Little Girl"		3:11
10.	"Taking the Blame"		3:35
11.	"You've Got Your Money, I've Got My Soul"		3:39
12.	"Ends Don't Mend" (contains hidden track, "Stripped," starting at 12:08)		14:41
13.	"Manic Recluse" (Japanese bonus track)		2:44

Deluxe edition disc two: "Stripped"
No.	Title	Length
1.	"Lost Weekend" (acoustic)	3:12
2.	"Bang Bang Bang" (acoustic)	2:57
3.	"Just a Ride" (acoustic)	3:19
4.	"You've Got Your Money, I've Got My Soul" (acoustic)	2:41
5.	"Dressed to Kill" (acoustic)	3:41
6.	"Out of Mind" (acoustic)	3:49
7.	"Dead Man's Shoes" (acoustic)	2:53
8.	"Running for My Life" (acoustic)	3:29
9.	"Passing Place" (acoustic)	3:46
10.	"Long Way Down from the Top" (acoustic)	2:27
11.	"Ends Don't Mend" (acoustic)	3:39
12.	"Stripped" (acoustic)	4:00

== Personnel ==
The Virginmarys

- Ally Dickaty – lead and backing vocals, guitar
- Danny Dolan – drums, percussion
- Matt Rose – bass guitar, backing vocals

Technical staff

- Toby Jepson – producer
- Chris Sheldon – mixing
