= Windwaker (band) =

Australian metal band

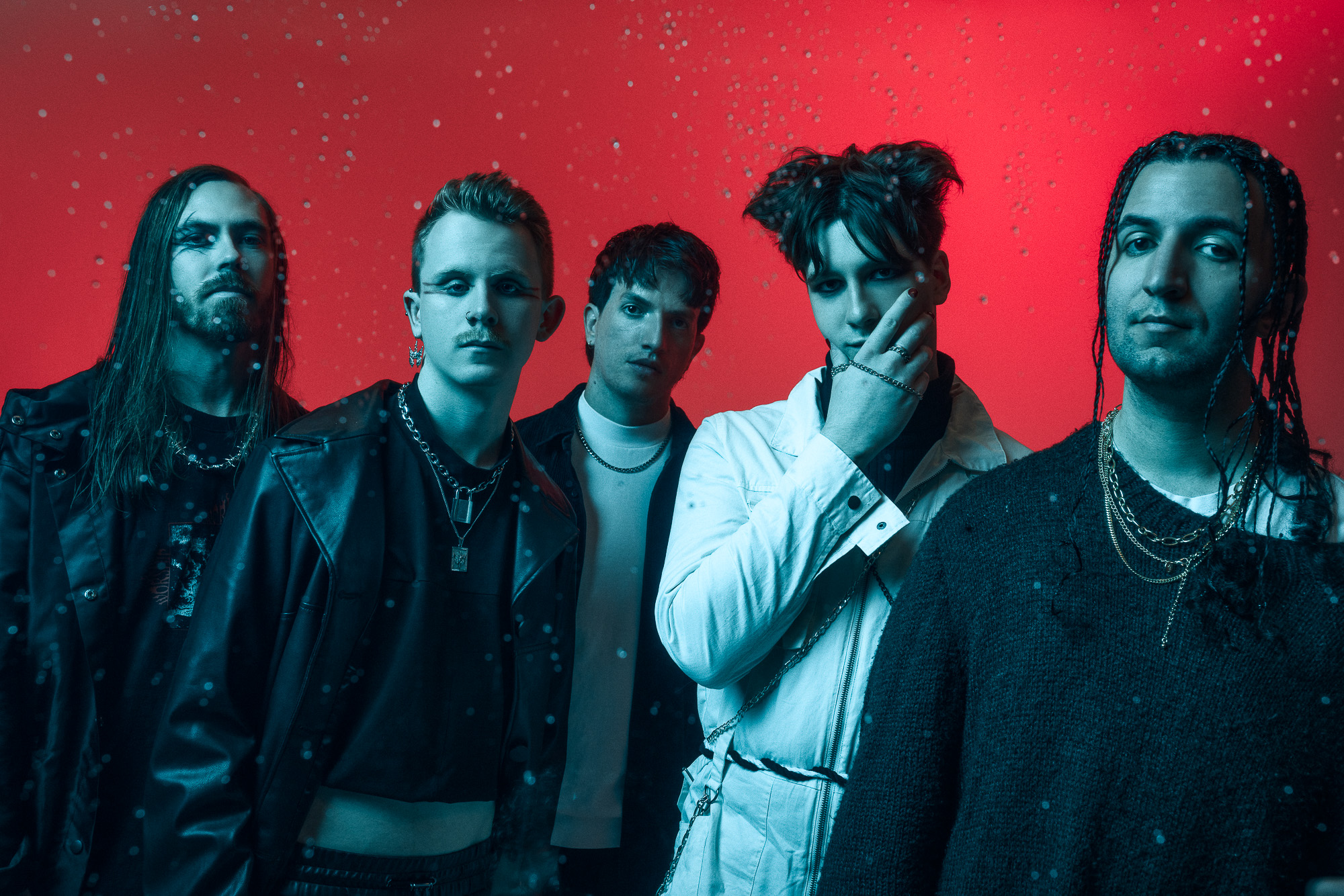
- Windwaker Promo 2022

Background information
- Origin: Wagga Wagga, New South Wales, Australia
- Genres: Alternative metal; metalcore
- Years active: 2014–present
- Labels: Fearless; Cooking Vinyl
- Members: Liam Guinane; Justin Keurntjes; Indey Salvestro; Chris Lalic; Connor Robins
- Past members: Jesse Crofts; Mark Mcghie; Will Eggleton; Chris Moohan; Jesse Holt; Will King
- Website: https://windwakerband.com

Windwaker is an Australian metalcore band from Melbourne, Australia. The band formed in 2014 and currently consists of lead vocalist Liam Guinane, guitarist Justin Keurntjes, bassist Indey Salvestro, keyboardist Connor Robins and drummer Chris Lalic.

In 2024 they released their second studio album Hyperviolence (2024). Prior to that, they released their first studio album Love Language (2022) two EPs: Fade (2017) and Empire (2019).

== History ==
=== Early years and Fade (2014–2018) ===
Windwaker, named after the Legend of Zelda game of the same name, was formed in Wagga Wagga, New South Wales in late 2014. The founding lineup featured vocalist Will King, bassist Indey Salvestro, drummer Chris Lalic and guitarists Mark Mcghie and Will Eggleton.

In April 2015, Windwaker relocated from Wagga Wagga, New South Wales to Melbourne, Victoria and began performing and recording new material. Their debut single "The Charade", featuring Zach Britt of Dream On, Dreamer, was released on 15 September.

Windwaker's next single "Castaway" was released on 2 November 2016, and was later included on their debut EP.

The band began performing with Liam Guinane, who unofficially acted as both a live and studio guitarist after the departure of Mcghie, while guitarist Chris Moohan began playing with the group after the departure of Eggleton. Windwaker's debut EP Fade was released on 31 May 2017. The EP was produced, mixed and mastered by Sonny Truelove at STL Studios in Sydney, Australia.

On 15 January 2018, Windwaker introduced guitarist Jesse Crofts as an official member. Two days later, Guinane was officially introduced as the fifth member of the band. On April 2, the band released the single "New Infinite", the first track to feature Guinane and Crofts. The band made their first festival appearance at BIGSOUND Festival in Brisbane, Queensland, in September.

=== Empire and Guinane's departure (2019–2020) ===
In early-2019, the hashtag #TheSitch frequently began to appear across social media forums in Australia. On 1 February 2019, Windwaker released the single "The Sitch" with an accompanying music video and announced pre-orders for their sophomore EP Empire. The band released the second single of the release, "My Empire", on March 5 with an accompanying music video. The self-produced EP was mixed, mastered and engineered by drummer Chris Lalic, while additional engineering was provided by guitarist Liam Guinane and Declan White.

Former vocalist Will King commented about the release: "Coming out of our last record, a record deeply rooted in post-adolescent feelings of pain and loneliness, as a band, it’s safe to say that we all had this strong desire to redeem ourselves of those sole qualities. I think we have always feared trapping ourselves in a box, kept in by one-dimensional expectations, and we are very conscious of not allowing that influence to hinder our creativity. We are absolutely not a band who is going to sit around all day writing the same songs over and over again."

On 10 March, Windwaker played their first large festival at Download Festival Melbourne, after winning a national triple j Unearthed competition. Their second EP, Empire was released on March 22, with a limited physical release following in June. All of the shows for the Empire tour sold out. The band subsequently signed with New World Artists for bookings.

In July Windwaker joined Beartooth on their Disease Tour as support, alongside Thornhill. Windwaker announced that Guinane was unable to attend the tour due to personal obligations, so former-Weighbridge vocalist/guitarist Sean Ross filled in. They also stated their plan to cover Silverchair's hit "Freak" on the tour. On September 9, Guinane announced he would be leaving Windwaker to focus on his other band Reside. He played at Windwaker's performances at Good Things in December and Unify Festival in January 2020 before departing.

=== Love Language and King's departure (2020–present) ===
On 30 December 2020, Windwaker announced their plans to release their debut studio album Love Language. On 17 December 2021, the band made their Fearless Records debut with the single "Toxic", a cover of the Britney Spears' single, and announced The Beautiful Tour with dates in early March.

On 11 February 2022, Windwaker released the single "Beautiful" with an accompanying music video and announced a May 6 release date for Love Language. On 4 March, they released the second single off their debut album, "Lucy" and its music video. The track was loosely inspired by psychedelic experiences. On March 25, their third single "Glow" was released alongside a music video. The fourth and final single of the album, "Superstitious Fantasy" was released on 15 April with its music video. The full album was then released on 6 May 2022.

On 15 September, the band announced on social media that Will King had departed from the band to focus on studying psychology, and that former guitarist and backing vocalist Liam Guinane had returned to fulfill lead vocal duties. After performing as a session member for 2022, Connor Robins was officially added to the band on keyboards and later featured on the band's follow-up single "Left in the Dark" released on 11 November with an accompanying music video. On 12 July 2024, the band released their second studio album, Hyperviolence.

== Members ==
Current

- Liam Guinane – lead vocals (2022–present); rhythm guitar, backup vocals (2017–2020); lead guitar, programming (2017–2018)
- Indey Salvestro – bass (2014–present)
- Chris Lalic – drums (2014–present); programming (2018–present)
- Justin Keurntjes – lead guitar, rhythm guitar (2025–present; 2024 touring)

Former

- Will King – lead vocals (2014–2022)
- Mark Mcghie – lead guitar (2014–2016)
- Will Eggleton – rhythm guitar (2014–2016)
- Chris Moohan – lead guitar (2016–2017)
- Jesse Holt – rhythm guitar (2016–2017)
- Jesse Crofts – lead guitar (2018–2025); rhythm guitar (2020–2025)
- Connor Robins – keyboards, synthesizers, programming, DJ (2022–2026)

Timeline

== Discography ==
=== Studio albums ===
List of studio albums
Title	Album details	Peak chart positions
Title	Album details	AUS
Love Language	Released: 6 May 2022; Label: Fearless, Cooking Vinyl; Format: CD, LP, digital download, streaming	—
Hyperviolence	Released: 12 July 2024; Label: Fearless, Cooking Vinyl; Format: CD, LP, digital download, streaming	—
Smile, You're on Camera	Released: 23 October 2026; Label: Fearless, Cooking Vinyl; Format: CD, LP, digital download, streaming	38

=== Extended plays ===
List of extended plays
Title	EP details	Peak chart positions
Title	EP details	AUS
Knock Down // Rebuild	Released: 2015; Label: Self-released; Format: CD	—
Fade	Released: 31 May 2017; Label: Self-released; Format: CD, digital download, streaming	—
Empire	Released: 22 March 2019; Label: Self-released; Format: CD, LP, digital download, streaming	— (Note: Empire did not enter the Top 100, but peaked at number 19 on the ARIA Digital Albums Chart and at number 3 on the AIR 100% Independent Albums Chart.)
Enter the Wall	Released: 15 March 2024; Label: Self-released; Format: CD, LP, digital download, streaming	—

=== Singles ===
Title	Year	Album
"The Charade" (featuring Zach Britt)	2015	Non-album singles
"Fade Sessions"	2017	Non-album singles
"New Infinite"	2018	Non-album singles
"The Sitch"	2019	Empire
"My Empire"	2019	Empire
"Toxic" (Britney Spears cover)	2021	Non-album single
"Beautiful"	2022	Love Language
"Lucy"	2022	Love Language
"Glow"	2022	Love Language
"Superstitious Fantasy"	2022	Love Language
"Left in the Dark"	2022	Non-album single
"Sirens"	2023	Hyperviolence
"Fractured State of Mind"	2024	Hyperviolence

=== Music videos ===
Song	Year	Director
"Castaway"	2016	Jordan Tan
"New Infinite"	2018	Kieran Ellis-Jones
"The Sitch"	2019	Ben Anderson
"My Empire"	2019	Colin Jeffs
"Reject" (live)	2020	
"Toxic"	2021	Jackson Bentley
"Beautiful"	2022	Ed Reiss
"Lucy"	2022	Ed Reiss
"Glow"	2022	Indey Salvestro
"Superstitious Fantasy"	2022	Ed Reiss
"Left in the Dark"	2022	Colin Jeffs
"Sirens"	2023	Andrew Vaughan
"Fractured State of Mind"	2024	Andrew Vaughan
"The Wall"	2024	Connor Robins and Indey Salvestro
"Break the Rules"	2024	Andrew Vaughan
"Get Out"	2024	Andrew Vaughan

== Awards and nominations ==
=== APRA Music Awards ===
The APRA Music Awards were established by Australasian Performing Right Association (APRA) in 1982 to honour the achievements of songwriters and music composers, and to recognise their song writing skills, sales and airplay performance, by its members annually.

Year	Nominee / work	Award	Result	Ref.
2025	"Sirens"	Most Performed Hard Rock / Heavy Metal Work	Nominated	
