= Jacoténe =

Australian musician

- Born: Chelsea Jacotine
- Origin: Melbourne, Australia
- Occupations: Singer; songwriter
- Instrument: Vocals
- Years active: 2022–present
- Website: www.jacotene.com

Chelsea Jacotine (known professionally as Jacoténe) is an Australian singer-songwriter, who released her debut single "I Need Therapy" in 2022, which won the Triple J Unearthed competition.

== Early life and education ==
Chelsea Jacotine was born in Melbourne. At seven months old, she was diagnosed with Acute Myeloid Leukaemia. Her parents instilled a love of music from an early age and at age 14, she began singing lessons.

== Career ==
=== 2022-present: "I Need Therapy" and Unearthed High win ===
In 2022, Jacoténe uploaded "I Need Therapy" which won the 2022 Triple J Unearthed.

In June 2025, Jacoténe released the debut EP Untitled (Read My Mind).

== Discography ==
=== Extended plays ===
List of EPs, with release date and label shown
Title	Details
Untitled (Read My Mind)	Released: 30 June 2025; Label: NOiZE, Sony Entertainment UK; Formats: digital download, streaming

== Awards and nominations ==
=== ARIA Music Awards ===
The ARIA Music Awards is an annual awards ceremony that recognises excellence, innovation, and achievement across all genres of Australian music. They commenced in 1987.

Year	Nominee / work	Award	Result	Ref.
2025	"Why'd You Do That?"	Best Soul/R&B Release	Nominated	

=== J Awards ===
The J Awards are an annual series of Australian music awards that were established by the Australian Broadcasting Corporation's youth-focused radio station Triple J. They commenced in 2005.

Year	Nominee / work	Award	Result	Ref.
2022	Jacoténe	Unearthed Artist of the Year	Nominated	
