= Hey Wanhaka =

2020 single by King Stingray

Single by King Stingray

from the album King Stingray
- Released: 14 October 2020
- Recorded: 2020
- Length: 3:55
- Label: Bargain Bin Records
- Songwriter(s): Roy Kellaway; Yirrŋa Yunupiŋu
- Producer(s): Roy Kellaway

King Stingray singles chronology
"Hey Wanhaka" (2020)	"Get Me Out" (2021)

Music video
- "Hey Wanhaka" on YouTube

"Hey Wanhaka" is a song by Australian rock group King Stingray, released on 14 October 2020 as their debut and lead single from their self-titled debut studio album (2022).

In Yolŋu Matha, "Hey Wanhaka" means "where you going?" or "what's happening?".

The song was nominated for the 2022 Environmental Music Prize.

== Music video ==
The Kayla Flett and Roy Kellaway directed music video was released on 7 December 2020. In a statement, Kellaway said "This clip tells a story of the Stingray man travelling around the Territory. The Stingray man meets up with the Lorrpu (white cockatoo) and they party and celebrate together. The cockatoo is then putting the word out to everything 'Hey Wanhaka? Whats everyone up to?'"

== Critical reception ==
Kate Hennessy from The Guardian said "The song has a colloquial swagger and a sense Yirrnga is greeting anyone who'll listen – and even better: those who won't – with his confident shouts of 'hey!' … It feels young and irrepressible but is also a trojan horse for the aural intensity that this line of Yunupiŋu men convey with their penetrating manikay (traditional song), which propels 'Hey Wanhaka' into a powerful outro."

Hayden Davis from Pilerats said "'Hey Wanhaka' is unlike anything we've ever heard before." Adding "It's a blend of rough-around-the-edges surf-rock rich with that distinct Australian charm mixed together with the rich tapestry of Indigenous culture, something that makes itself the centrepiece both through its historic melodies and its bilingual properties, switching between English and Yolŋu Matha."

Triple J said "Pounding percussion and striking guitars are not only reminiscent of not only classic Aussie acts of the 80s, they're also rough and tumbling enough to be loved by fans of triple j favourites like The Chats."

== Track listings ==
Digital download/streaming

1. "Hey Wanhaka" – 3:55

7" LP single (BB-017)

1. "Hey Wanhaka" – 3:55
2. "Get Me Out" – 3:15
