= The Virginmarys =

English rock band

- Origin: Macclesfield, England
- Genres: Rock, punk rock, alternative rock
- Years active: 2006–present
- Labels: Cooking Vinyl, Wind Up
- Members: Ally Dickaty; Danny Dolan
- Past members: Matt Rose; Chris Birdsall
- Website: thevirginmarys.com

The Virginmarys are an English rock duo from Macclesfield, England. The band formed in 2006 as a trio and self-released a limited series of sold-out EPs before releasing their debut album, King of Conflict, on DoubleCross/Cooking Vinyl and Wind Up Records (US) in February 2013. The album was awarded Editors Choice by iTunes US following their songs "Bang Bang Bang" and "Just A Ride," both being iTunes Singles Of The Week, and was then nominated for Album Of The Year at the Classic Rock Awards 2013. In 2013, The Virginmarys were crowned Best Breakthrough act at the Classic Rock Awards. "Motherless Land", the first single from the band's second LP, Divides, was released on 16 February 2016. Produced by Gil Norton, Divides was released on 6 May 2016 via Wind-up Records.

== Biography ==
The band formed as a trio in Macclesfield in 2009. The band spent much of their early years touring extensively; they first played at the Download Festival in 2010 and have toured as a support act to Slash, Shinedown, Terrorvision, Skunk Anansie, Eagles of Death Metal, The View, Ash, Feeder, Queens Of The Stone Age, and We Are Scientists, as well as playing their headline gigs throughout UK, Europe, US, and Japan. The band released a series of self-financed E.P.s during this period and recorded their first mini-album, Cast the First Stone, in 2010, produced by Toby Jepson and mixed by Mike Fraser.

In late 2011, the band started working on their debut full-length album, again with Toby Jepson as producer (Chris Sheldon mixed the album) and continued to tour. They wanted the freedom to make their own album, and in 2012, they announced record deals with Double Cross / Cooking Vinyl (in Europe), Wind Up Records (United States), and Hydrant Music (Japan). The debut album, King of Conflict, was released on 4 February 2013. On 14 November 2013, they were named Best Breakthrough act at the 2013 Classic Rock Awards.

In 2015, production began for their second album, Divides, produced by Gil Norton. The record was released on 6 May 2016 release via Wind-up Records.

In 2017, the band chose to move forward independently and has since released two EPs, Sitting Ducks and Devil Keeps Coming along with the album Northern Sun Sessions.

== Band members ==
- Ally Dickaty- vocals, guitar (2008–present)
- Danny Dolan - drums, (2008–present)
- Matt Rose - bass, vocals (2009–December 2016)
- Ross Massey - Touring bass (2017–2020)

== Discography ==
=== Studio albums ===
List of albums, with selected details and chart positions
Title	Album details	Peak chart positions		Sales
Title	Album details	UK	US Heat	Sales
Self Medication	Released: 2008; Label: Three Hearts Limited	—	—	
King of Conflict	Released: 4 February 2013; Label: Cooking Vinyl	93	8	US: 9,000
Divides	Released: 6 May 2016; Label: Cooking Vinyl	—	—	
Northern Sun Sessions	Released: 16 November 2018; Label: Threehearts	—	—	
The House Beyond the Fires	Released 2024			
"—" denotes a recording that did not chart or was not released in that territory.

=== EPs and mini-albums ===
- Cast the First Stone (2010)
- Just a Ride (2011)
- Portrait of Red (2011)
- Dead Man's Shoes (2012)
- Sitting Ducks (2017)
- Devil Keeps Coming (2022)

=== Singles ===
Year	Song	Chart peak			Album
Year	Song	CAN Rock	US Alt.	US Main.	Album
2012	"Dead Man's Shoes"	17	31	35	King of Conflict
2013	"Just a Ride"	—	—	30	King of Conflict
2016	"Into Dust"	—	—	—	Divides
2016	"Motherless Land"	—	—	—	Divides
2017	"Sweet Loretta (You Know Me Better)"	—	—	—	Sitting Ducks
2019	"Northern Sun"	—	—	—	Northern Sun Sessions
2022	"The Meds"	—	—	—	The Devil Keeps Coming
"—" denotes a release that did not chart.
