= National Indigenous Music Awards 2023 =

Edition of Australian music awards

- Date: 12 August 2023
- Venue: Darwin Amphitheatre, Northern Territory, Australia
- Hosted by: Fred Leone and Elaine Crombie

Highlights
- Most wins: King Stingray (2)
- Most nominations: Budjerah & Wildfire Manwurrk (3)
- Website: nima.musicnt.com.au

Television/radio coverage
- Network: NITV and SBS On Demand

The National Indigenous Music Awards 2023 were the 20th annual National Indigenous Music Awards (NIMAs), and took place on 12 August 2023. Nominations were revealed on 12 July 2023.

== Performers ==
- Thelma Plum
- Budjerah
- Barkaa
- Kobie Dee
- Dean Brady
- Ngulmiya
- Fred Leone - "Yirimi Gundir"

== Hall of Fame inductee ==
- Yothu Yindi

== Triple J Unearthed National Indigenous Winner ==
- Djanaba

== Archie Roach Foundation Award ==
- Wildfire Manwurrk

== Awards ==
The nominations was revealed on 12 July 2023. Winners indicated in boldface, with other nominees in plain.

Artist of the Year

Artist	Result
**Budjerah**	Won
Jessica Mauboy	Nominated
Mo'Ju	Nominated
Kobie Dee	Nominated
The Kid Laroi	Nominated

New Talent of the Year

Artist	Result
**Bumpy**	Won
Royston Noell	Nominated
Wildfire Manwurrk	Nominated
Marlon X Rulla	Nominated
Tjaka	Nominated

Album of the Year

Artist and album	Result
**Thelma Plum – Meanjin (EP)**	Won
Ngulmiya – Ngulmiya	Nominated
Mo'Ju – Oro Plata Mata	Nominated
Miiesha – Smoke & Mirrors	Nominated
Beddy Rays – Beddy Rays	Nominated

Film Clip of the Year

Artist and song	Result
Wildfire Manwurrk – "Lonely Bangardi"	Nominated
Budjerah – "Therapy"	Nominated
A.B. Original – "King Billy Cokebottle"	Nominated
Thelma Plum – "The Brown Snake"	Nominated
**King Stingray – "Let's Go"**	Won

Song of the Year

Artist and song	Result
Bumpy – "Hide and Seek"	Nominated
Budjerah – "Therapy"	Nominated
Miiesha – "Skin Deep"	Nominated
**King Stingray – "Let's Go"**	Won
Yirrmal featuring Dami Im - "Promised Land"	Nominated

Community Clip of the Year

Artist and song	Result
**Wildfire Manwurrk – "Mararradj"**	Won
Utju Community – "Tjamuku Tjukurpa Kanyila"	Nominated
Lil Youngins - "The Problem"	Nominated
Indigenous Outreach Project w/ Gunyangara, Yirrkala & Dhalinbuy, (NT) featuring Yirrmal - "Indigenous"	Nominated
Gunyangara, Yirrkala & Dhalinbuy featuring Yirrmal & Garrthalala Community - "Garrthalala Manikay"	Nominated
Dunghutti Community in Kempsey (NSW) - The Black Truth - "There's Still Hope"	Nominated

Indigenous Language Award

Artist and song	Result
**Ngulmiya – Ngulmiya**	Won
