= Martin Goldschmidt =

- Occupations: Co-founder and Chairman, Cooking Vinyl Group
- Years active: 1982 – present
- Labels: Cooking Vinyl; Essential Music & Marketing

Martin Goldschmidt is a British music executive. He's the co-founder and chairman of UK independent record label Cooking Vinyl and co-founder of Essential Music & Marketing.

== Early career ==
Goldschmidt attended the Polytechnic of Wales (now the University of South Wales) in the mid 1970s. Goldschmidt's involvement in music began in 1982 when he founded management company and booking agency Forward Music. The company was subsequently renamed FAB in 1988 and later sold to Rob Challice/CODA in 1997. Between 1984 and 1986 Goldschmidt also ran independent record label Forward Sounds International.

== Cooking Vinyl ==
Cooking Vinyl was founded in 1986 by Goldschmidt and his former business partner Pete Lawrence, initially operating out of Goldschmidt's council house in Stockwell, South London. Over 25 years on the label has diversified from its original folk roots into releasing rock, metal, indie, punk and electronica. Cooking Vinyl is also recognised as a pioneer of ‘artist services’ deals working with artists such as Billy Bragg, The Prodigy and Marilyn Manson.

In 2003 Goldschmidt and former Vital Distribution MD Mike Chadwick set up independent distributor and service provider Essential Music & Marketing, which operates as part of the Cooking Vinyl Group.

In 2005 Cooking Vinyl, led by Goldschmidt, set up one of the UK's earliest online distribution companies, Uploader, which was sold in 2007 to the Independent Online Distribution Alliance (IODA).

== Industry honours and other achievements ==
Goldschmidt was nominated as Independent Entrepreneur of the Year at the inaugural Association of Independent Music (AIM) Independent Music Awards.
