= The Southern River Band =

Australian band

Background information
- Origin: Perth, Western Australia
- Years active: 2013–present
- Label: Cooking Vinyl Australia (2024)
- Members: see below
- Website: www.thesouthernriverband.com

The Southern River Band is musical band from Thornlie, a suburb of Perth, Western Australia. Formed in 2013, their fourth album, D.I.Y., became their first to enter the ARIA top 50.

The group signed with Cooking Vinyl Australia in 2024.

== Members ==
Current members

- Dan Carroll
- Callum Kramer
- Tyler Michie
- Pat Smith

Former members

- Todd Pickett
- Jason Caniglia
- Anton Dindar
- Carlo Romeo
- Nathan Sproule
- Julian Peet

== Discography ==
=== Albums ===
List of albums, with selected chart positions
Title	Album details	Peak chart positions
Title	Album details	AUS
Live at the Pleasuredome	Released: November 2016; Label: The Southern River Band; Format: CD, LP, digital	—
Rumour & Innuendo	Released: October 2019; Label: The Southern River Band; Format: CD, LP, digital	—
Greatest Hits - Live from RADA Studios	Released: 2022; Label: The Southern River Band; Format: LP; Recorded June 2021	—
D.I.Y.	Released: 2024; Label: Cooking Vinyl Australia (CVCD151); Format: CD, LP, digital	48
Easier Said Than Done	Released: 17 October 2025; Label: Civilians, Cooking Vinyl (CVCD157); Format: CD, LP, digital	16

== Awards and nominations ==
=== AIR Awards ===
The Australian Independent Record Awards (commonly known informally as AIR Awards) is an annual awards night to recognise, promote and celebrate the success of Australia's Independent Music sector.

Year	Nominee / work	Award	Result	Ref.
2025	D.I.Y.	Best Independent Heavy Album or EP	Nominated	
2026	Easier Said Than Done	Best Independent Rock Album or EP	Nominated	
