= Beddy Rays (album) =

Studio album by Beddy Rays
- Released: 29 July 2022
- Length: 39:20
- Label: Beddy Rays
- Producer: Brock Weston

Beddy Rays chronology
Lost Found Beat Around (2017)	Beddy Rays (2022)	Do What Ya Wanna (2025)

Singles from Beddy Rays
- 1. "Sobercoaster" Released: 22 April 2020; 2. "Wait a While" Released: 12 March 2021; 3. "Week on Repeat" Released: 18 August 202; 4. "On My Own" Released: 19 November 2021; 5. "Milk" Released: 4 February 2022; 6. "Sort It Out" Released: 27 April 2022; 7. "Handful" Released: 29 July 2022

Beddy Rays is the eponymous debut studio album from Australian rock group, Beddy Rays. The line-up was Lewis McKenna on guitar, Bradley O'Connor on bass guitar, Jackson van Issum "Jacko" on lead vocals and guitar, and Benjamin Wade on drums. It was released on 29 July 2022 and peaked at number 8 on the ARIA Albums chart.

At the 2022 ARIA Music Awards, the album was nominated for Michael Gudinski Breakthrough Artist.

At the National Indigenous Music Awards 2023, the album was nominated for Album of the Year.

== Background ==
Beddy Rays is Beddy Rays' debut album. The band formed in 2017 in Brisbane. The line-up was Lewis "Lewy" McKenna on guitar, Bradley O'Connor on bass guitar, Jackson "Jacko" van Issum on lead vocals and guitar, and Benjamin Wade on drums. They released an extended play, Lost Found Beat Around, in December 2017. Their album was announced on their Facebook account on 2 June 2022 and released on 29 July, which peaked at number 8 on the ARIA Albums chart. It produced seven singles.

== Reception ==
Professional ratings
Review scores
Source	Rating
Distorted Sound	7/10
Kerrang!	4/5
X-Press Magazine	8/10

Millie Warwick from Distorted Sound wrote: "If the criteria for a self-titled debut album is to entirely capture the energy of a band, then Beddy Rays does exactly this. With the main themes being love for their hometown, enjoying the summer and checking in on your friends, you'll feel well acquainted with the band after listening, and immersed into their world."

Jake Richardson from Kerrang felt that "Aside from acoustic number 'Brin's Song', they largely stick to the same formula across this album, but rather than becoming tiresome, the four-piece's approach works so well that there's no point in deviating. Beddy Rays know what they do well, their identity is clear and they use this record to explore their sound in all its fast-paced, party-starting glory."

Tiana Speter from Hysteria Mag opined: "Embracing their sturdy footing between the surf rock, indie and garage rock realms, Beddy Rays come out swinging, hugging and thumping on their first ever full length album."

Ryan Ellis from X-press Magazine wrote that "Beddy Rays is an unrestrained and unpretentious rollercoaster of undeniably infectious tunes. Loaded with loose surf-punk melodies, crunchy riffs and infectious vocals, it will inevitably induce and maintain good times in any situation. All you need to do is embrace it."

Beat Magazine stated "Beddy Rays are the epitome of good summer vibes, with their surf-rock vibe and catchy lyrics."

== Track listing ==
All tracks are written by Lewis McKenna, Bradley O'Connor, Jackson van Issum, Benjamin Wade; unless otherwise indicated

Beddy Rays track listing
No.	Title	Length
1.	"Wait a While"	2:55
2.	"Week on Repeat"	2:26
3.	"Fotu" (McKenna, O'Connor, van Issum, Wade, Matthew Cochran)	3:11
4.	"On My Own"	3:21
5.	"Sort It Out"	1:56
6.	"Handful"	3:03
7.	"Brin's Song"	3:09
8.	"Sobercoaster"	2:42
9.	"Milk"	2:32
10.	"Ashtray"	2:58
11.	"Feels Nice"	1:57
12.	"Coffee Stops" (McKenna, O'Connor, van Issum, Wade, Matthew Cochran)	2:26
13.	"Easy Man"	3:02
14.	"Good with Bad"	3:42
Total length:		39:20

== Personnel ==
Beddy Rays

- Lewis McKenna – guitar
- Bradley O'Connor – bass guitar
- Jackson van Issum "Jacko" – lead vocals, guitar
- Benjamin Wade – drums

Artisans

- Brock Weston – producer, engineer, mixer
- Matthew Cochran – co-producer
- Steve Smart – mastering engineer
- Campbell Walker – cover

== Charts ==
Chart performance for Beddy Rays
Chart (2022)	Peak position
Australian Albums (ARIA)	8
