= 2022 J Awards =

18th Annual J Awards

J Awards of 2022
- Date: 17 November 2022
- Venue: Australia
- Website: abc.net.au/triplej

The 2022 J Awards are the 18th annual J Awards, established by the Australian Broadcasting Corporation's youth-focused radio station Triple J.

The eligibility period for releases took place between November 2021 and October 2022. The nominations were announced on 1 November 2022 and winners were announced on 17 November 2022.

== Awards ==
=== Australian Album of the Year ===
The nominees for albums, chosen for their creativity, musicianship and contribution to Australian music.

List of Australian Album of the Year nominees
Artist	Album	Result
Eliza & The Delusionals	Now and Then	Nominated
Flume	Palaces	Nominated
Gang of Youths	Angel in Realtime	Won
Julia Jacklin	Pre Pleasure	Nominated
King Stingray	King Stingray	Nominated
Meg Mac	Matter of Time	Nominated
Northlane	Obsidian	Nominated
Sampa the Great	As Above, So Below	Nominated
Spacey Jane	Here Comes Everybody	Nominated
Stand Atlantic	F.E.A.R.	Nominated

=== Double J Artist of the Year ===
The artists who impressed Double J with their musical excellence and contribution to Australian music.

List of Double J Artist of the Year nominees
Artist	Result
Courtney Barnett	Nominated
HAAi	Nominated
King Stingray	Nominated
Midnight Oil	Won
Sampa the Great	Nominated

=== Australian Video of the Year ===
This award celebrates creativity, originality and technical excellence in music videos.

List of Australian Video of the Year nominees
Director	Artist and Song	Result
Raghav Rampal	1300– "Oldboy"	Won
W.A.M. Bleakley	Confidence Man – "Holiday"	Nominated
Michael Hili	Flume (featuring May-a) – "Say Nothing"	Nominated
Tanya Babic & Jason Sukadana (Versus)	Party Dozen (featuring Nick Cave) – "Macca the Mutt"	Nominated
Dylan River	RONA (featuring Helena) – "Closure"	Nominated

=== Unearthed Artist of the Year ===
Five artists that have risen through the ranks of Unearthed and are set for massive things in 2023.

List of Unearthed Artist of the Year nominees
Artist	Result
Elsy Wameyo	Won
Grentperez	Nominated
Jacoténe	Nominated
South Summit	Nominated
Speed	Nominated

=== Done Good Award ===
The Done Good Award recognises an individual, group or business in the Australian music scene who has gone above-and-beyond and done something real good this year.

List of Done Good nominees
Artist	Actions	Result
David Herington	An "unsung legend" tour manager, stage technician and band photographer who volunteered to assist in floods in the Northern Rivers.	Nominated
Eliza Hull	A "muso and disability advocate" who campaigns for inclusion and accessibility in the music industry, producing audio series documenting life with a rare neurological condition.	Nominated
Jake Taylor (In Hearts Wake)	A "climate champion" who directed an environmental advocacy documentary and offset his band's carbon emissions made during recording and touring.	Nominated
Kobie Dee	Recognised for "enriching First Nations communities", Dee headlined an all-ages tour for local Aboriginal communities and is involved in songwriting workshops and raising awareness for mental health.	Won
Raising Their Voices	A "landmark report into sexual harassment" that involved the documented experiences of 1600 participants to confirm the oppression and bullying within the Australian music industry.	Nominated
