= Milkumana =

2021 single by King Stingray

Single by King Stingray

from the album King Stingray
- Released: 19 August 2021
- Length: 3:03
- Label: Cooking Vinyl Australia
- Songwriters: Roy Kellaway; Yirrŋa Yunupiŋu
- Producer: Roy Kellaway

King Stingray singles chronology
"Get Me Out" (2021)	"Milkumana" (2021)	"Camp Dog" (2022)

Music video
- "Milkumana" on YouTube

"Milkumana" is a song by Australian rock group King Stingray, released on 19 August 2021 as the third single from their self-titled debut studio album (2022). In Yolŋu Matha, "Milkumana" means to show, share or pass on knowledge through stories and song. Upon release, the group said the song is about "leadership" saying, "We are all living under the same sun, sailing in the same boat, towards a brighter future. It's about role models and the importance of setting good examples for the new generation."

At the J Awards of 2021, the song's video was nominated for Australian Video of the Year.

At the National Indigenous Music Awards 2022, the song won Song of the Year.

The song won first place in the 2022 Vanda & Young Global Songwriting Competition.

At the APRA Music Awards of 2022, the song was shortlisted for Song of the Year. At the APRA Music Awards of 2023, the song was nominated for Most Performed Rock Work of the Year.

== Music video ==
The Roy Kellaway and Sam Brumby directed music video for 'Mikumana' was filmed in North East Arnhem Land and features elders Mangatjay Yunupingu and Malŋay Yunupingu, and puts their hometown of Yirrkala front and centre.

== Critical reception ==
Sosefina Fuamoli from Music Feeds called it "another bright insight into the collective's tight grasp on music and its delivery. Blending English and Yolŋu in with uptempo rhythms and bright production, 'Milkumana' is an effortlessly charming and spirited offering from the young group who is properly making waves."

Triple J called it "a vibrant cut that pulses with some disco-leaning groove and an excellent, late chorus switch-up."

== Track listings ==
Digital download/streaming

1. "Milkumana" – 3:04

7" LP single (limited edition) (CVLP1127)

1. "Milkumana" – 3:04
2. "Lupa" – 3:15
