= Get Me Out =

2021 single by King Stingray

Single by King Stingray

from the album King Stingray
- Released: 18 January 2021
- Recorded: 2020
- Label: Bargain Bin Records
- Songwriter(s): Roy Kellaway; Yirrŋa Yunupiŋu
- Producer(s): Roy Kellaway

King Stingray singles chronology
"Hey Wanhaka" (2020)	"Get Me Out" (2021)	"Milkumana" (2021)

"Get Me Out" is a song by Australian rock group King Stingray, released on 18 January 2021 as the second single from their self-titled debut studio album (2022).

Songwriter Roy Kellaway said "Yirrŋa and I wrote this song when we were away on tour. We were thinking about our hometown Yirrkala. But when we saw the sun go down and we saw that sunset we had a mutual feeling of living under the one sun, living under the same sun."

At the AIR Awards of 2022, the song was nominated for Independent Song of the Year.

At the APRA Music Awards of 2022, the song was shortlisted for Song of the Year.

== Critical reception ==
Dan Condon from Double J said "It's a bit of a slower burn than their first single, which just shows their versatility. The gentle rumble of the band provide solid backing for Yunupiŋu's perfect vocal melodies, which start off restrained but soon see him showing off the power and range of his voice. It's as catchy as it is stirring and will no doubt help this new band continue to win the hearts of a broad range of music lovers."

In an album review, Andrew Stafford from The Guardian said the song "has an irresistible driving momentum" and "captures the moment of feeling the cool breeze on your face again and the warm embrace of family."

Australian Prime Minister Anthony Albanese, named "Get Me Out" as his song of the year in 2022.
