= Tracy McNeil =

Canadian-born country musician, based in Australia

Tracy McNeil (born c1974) is a Canadian-born country musician, based in Australia.

== Career ==
Tracy McNeil grew up on Lake Erie in southern Ontario, Canada. Both of her parents were in bands together in the 1970s, with her mother retiring when their daughter was born.

McNeil began her solo music career in 2006 in Canada. After releasing her debut album Room Where She Lives, she moved to Melbourne, Australia in 2007 and began to ingrain herself within the local music scene. She collaborated with Australian Jordie Lane as the duo Fireside Bellows, and they released an album No Time to Die.

Her first album in Australia was 2011's Fire From Burning, and saw McNeil move away from her previous work's traditional country sound, and instead experimented with pop and rock influences. Following the album's release, McNeil married Luke Sinclair of the alt-country band Idle Hoes.

In 2014, McNeil announced her next album Nobody Ever Leaves would be released in July and followed by a tour with her band The GoodLife, featuring Bree Hartley (drums), Matt Green (lead guitar), Rod Boothroyd (bass) and Luke Sinclair (guitar). Prior to the album's release, McNeil and Sinclair began planning a collaborative project named Bell Street Delays. They toured the project as a duo, and released the single Not This Time in 2015, with a planned album to follow. The couple separated in 2018.

As Tracy McNeil & The GoodLife, McNeil released Thieves in 2016, and You Be the Lightning in 2020. The latter was released on Cooking Vinyl Australia, and co-produced with her partner Dan Parsons. It was voted 17th best album of 2020 by Double J, nominated for Best Blues and Roots Album at the ARIA Music Awards, and was nominated for the Australian Music Prize.

In 2023, McNeil and Parson released an album as a duo under the name Minor Gold, following the release of several singles and a debut performance at that year's Port Fairy Folk Festival.

== Discography ==
Solo

- Room Where She Lives (2007)
- Fire From Burning (2011)
- Nobody Ever Leaves (2014)

Tracy McNeil & The GoodLife

- Thieves (2016)
- You Be the Lightning (2020)

Minor Gold

- Minor Gold (2023)
- Way to the Sun (2025)

== Awards ==
- 2014 - Metro M Award for Album of the Year - Best Country Album - Fire from Burning - (Nominated)
- 2014 - Music Victoria Awards - Best Country Album & Best Folk or Roots - Nobody Ever Leaves - (Nominated)
- 2016 - Music Victoria Awards - Best Country Album - Thieves - (Won)
- 2020 - Music Victoria Awards - Best Country Album - You Be the Lightning - (Won)
- 2020 - Australian Music Prize - You Be The Lightning - (Nominated)
- 2020 - ARIA Music Awards - Best Blues and Roots Album - You Be the Lightning - (Nominated)
