= Tobiahs =

Australian EDM producer (born 1998)

Tobiahs Fakhri
- Born: Tobiahs Fakhri; 30 May 1998 (age 28); Melbourne, Australia
- Genres: EDM; pop
- Occupations: Producer; singer; songwriter; musician
- Instruments: Digital audio workstation; vocals
- Years active: 2017–present
- Labels: 100s+1000s; Mushroom (2019–present)
- Website: tobiahs.bandcamp.com

Tobiahs Fakhri (born 30 May 1998), known professionally by the mononym Tobiahs, is an Australian electronic dance music producer, singer, songwriter, and musician from Melbourne, Australia. He is best known for his singles "Lifetime" and "Angel of Mine".

Tobiahs has been the recipient of various award nominations, including nominated for Most Performed Dance/Electronic Work at the 2025 APRA Awards for "Lifetime", and nominated for Song of the Year at the 2025 ARIA Awards for "Angel of Mine".

== Early life and education ==
Tobiahs was born Tobiahs Fakhri on 30 May 1998. Fakhri's uncle co-owns the Indigenous Hip Hop Projects organisation with Dion Brownfield, father of Australian musician Kian.

== Career ==
Fakhri released his debut single, "Through to You", in June 2017. This was followed by the singles "To Be Honest" and "Sculpted" in 2018. Fakhri signed to Mushroom Group subsidiary 100s+1000s in 2019. and his 2019 single "Late Night" was certified gold in Australia in 2023.

In 2020, Fakhri released "Running".

His January 2024 single "Lifetime" peaked at number 16 on the ARIA Australian Artist Singles Chart and number 13 on the Australian Australian Independent Record Labels Association Independent Singles Chart.

Fakhri's debut EP To You by Us (Vol. 1) was released on 15 August 2025. The EP reached number 38 on the ARIA Albums Chart in October 2025.

== Musical style and influences ==
Fakhri's musical style consists of electronic dance music and pop music.

== Discography ==
=== Extended plays ===
List of extended plays, with release date, label, and selected chart positions shown
| Title | EP details | Peak chart positions |
| Title | EP details | AUS |
|---|---|---|
| To You by Us (Vol. 1) | Released: 15 August 2025; Label: Mushroom (9341004145184); Formats: Digital download, streaming | 38 |

=== Charted and/or certified singles ===
List of charted or certified singles, with year released, selected chart positions, certifications, and album name shown
| Title | Year | Peak chart positions | | | | Certifications | Album |
| Title | Year | AUS | AUS Indie | NZ Hot | UK | Certifications | Album |
|---|---|---|---|---|---|---|---|
| "Late Night" | 2019 | — | — | — | — | ARIA: Gold | Non-album singles |
| "Lifetime" | 2024 | — (Note: "Lifetime" did not enter the ARIA Top 100 Singles Chart, but peaked at number 5 and number 16 on the ARIA Top 20 Australian Dance Singles Chart and the ARIA Top 20 Australian Artist Singles Chart, respectively.) | 13 | 16 | — | ARIA: Platinum | To You by Us (Vol. 1) |
| "Angel of Mine" | 2025 | — (Note: "Angel of Mine" did not enter the ARIA Top 100 Singles Chart, but peaked at number 19 on the ARIA Top 20 Australian Artist Singles Chart.) | 1 | — | 96 | | To You by Us (Vol. 1) |
| "Where You Really Come From" (with VV-Ace) | 2026 | — (Note: "Where You Really Come From" did not enter the ARIA Top 100 Singles Chart, but peaked at number 14 on the ARIA Australian Artist Singles Chart.) | 10 | — | — | | |

== Awards and nominations ==
=== APRA Awards ===
The APRA Awards are held in Australia and New Zealand by the Australasian Performing Right Association to recognise songwriting skills, sales and airplay performance by its members annually.

| Year | Nominee / work | Award | Result | Ref. |
|---|---|---|---|---|
| 2025 | "Lifetime": (Tobiahs Fakhri; Timothy Maxey; John Scherer) | Most Performed Dance/Electronic Work | Nominated | |

=== ARIA Music Awards ===
The ARIA Music Awards is an annual awards ceremony that recognises excellence, innovation, and achievement across all genres of Australian music. They commenced in 1987.

| Year | Nominee / work | Award | Result | Ref. |
|---|---|---|---|---|
| 2025 | "Angel of Mine" | Song of the Year | Nominated | |
