= To You by Us (Vol. 1) =

2025 extended play by Tobiahs

EP by Tobiahs
- Released: 15 August 2025
- Length: 21:35
- Label: Mushroom
- Producer: Tobiahs

Singles from To You by Us (Vol. 1)
- 1. "Lifetime" Released: 12 January 2024; 2. "Alone" Released: 21 June 2024; 3. "Angel of Mine" Released: 17 January 2025; 4. "Cross You Mind" Released: 17 July 2025; 5. "Before You Broke My Heart" Released: 15 August 2025

To You by Us (Vol. 1) is the debut extended play by Australian electronic dance music producer Tobiahs, released through Mushroom Group on 15 August 2025.

Preceded by the singles "Lifetime" and "Angel of Mine", the EP peaked at number 38 on the ARIA Albums Chart.

== Background ==
Upon announcement, Tobiahs said: "These are the songs my community backed – from sharing clips of me testing them at shows to jumping into Twitch sessions and dropping feedback in real time. So much of what I create is shaped by the people around me, and this project is a direct reflection of that."

== Reception ==
Scoop NZ wrote that "To You by Us (Vol. 1) celebrates the power of direct artist-to-fan relationships. Tobiahs' sound lives in the tension between euphoria and melancholy, intimacy and energy, rooted in club culture but grounded in emotional storytelling. It's this duality that has cemented his place as one of the most compelling new voices in Australian electronic music."

== Commercial performance ==
The EP failed to enter the ARIA Top 100 Albums Chart initially upon release, but peaked at number 16 on the Australian Artist Top 20 Albums Chart. Following its physical release in September, the EP debuted and peaked at number 38 on the ARIA Albums Chart.

== Track listing ==
To You by Us (Vol. 1) track listing
No.	Title	Writer(s)	Producer	Length
1.	"Baby Come Over" (with Yaw Dadzie)	Tobiahs Fakhri; Yaw Dadzie; Nikki Katiforis	Fakhri; Katiforis	2:54
2.	"Before You Broke My Heart"	Fakhri; Jerome Farah; Simon Mills; Sian Powell; Neil Tolliday	Fakhri; Katiforis	2:37
3.	"Angel of Mine"	Rhett Lawrence; Travon Potts	Fakhri; Katiforis	2:42
4.	"Alone"	Fakhri; Felony Davis; Farrah; Katiforis	Fakhri; Farrah; Katiforis	2:57
5.	"Cross You Mind"	Walter Afanasieff; Babyface; Robin Thicke	Fakhri; Babyface; Katiforis	2:31
6.	"Lifetime"	Fakhri; Timothy Maxie; John Scherer	Fakhri; Katiforis	2:38
7.	"You Don't Love Yourself" (featuring Ovi Wood)	Fakhri; Gabby Callwell	Fakhri; Katiforis	2:38
8.	"Do You Get Me?"	Fakhri; Paul Gray; Ben Grayson; Damon Grant	Fakhri; Katiforis	3:03
Total length:				21:35

== Charts ==
=== Weekly charts ===
Weekly chart performance for To You by Us (Vol. 1)
Chart (2025)	Peak position
Australian Albums (ARIA)	38

=== Year-end charts ===
Year-end chart performance for To You by Us (Vol. 1)
Chart (2025)	Position
Australian Dance Albums (ARIA)	48
