= Cooking Vinyl =

British independent record label

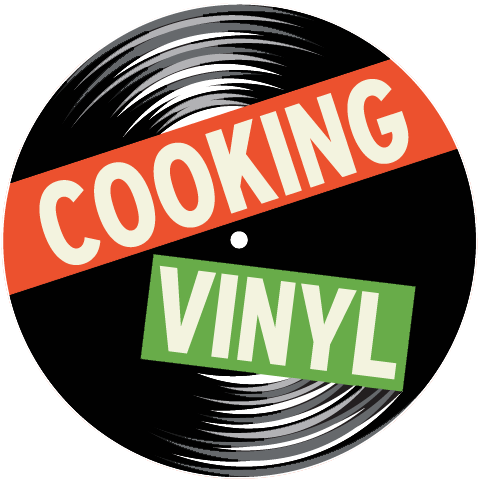
- Founded: 1986
- Founder: Martin Goldschmidt; Pete Lawrence
- Distributor: RedEye / Exceleration Music
- Country of origin: United Kingdom
- Location: London, England (HQ)
- Official website: Cooking Vinyl; Cooking Vinyl Publishing

Cooking Vinyl is a British independent record label, based in Camden, London. It was founded in 1986 by former manager and booking agent Martin Goldschmidt and his business partner Pete Lawrence. Goldschmidt remains the current owner and chairman, while Rob Collins is managing director.

== History ==
=== 1986–1992 ===
Cooking Vinyl was set up in 1986 by former manager and booking agent Martin Goldschmidt and distribution manager Pete Lawrence, who initially ran the business as a part-time venture out of a spare room in Goldschmidt's council house in Stockwell, South London.

In 1986 Cooking Vinyl recorded an impromptu live performance around a campfire at a folk festival by the singer Michelle Shocked, on a Sony Walkman with fading batteries. One of its first releases, Cooking Vinyl released the recording as The Campfire Tapes, and it sold 250,000 copies worldwide.

In 1989, the company was close to bankruptcy when their distributors, Rough Trade, went into receivership. Pete Lawrence sold his stake in the business to Martin Goldschmidt who continued the business while servicing the debt of the company of a period of five years.

=== 1993–1999 ===
Besides traditional royalty agreements, Cooking Vinyl developed 'artist services' deals in the 1990s, where the artist retains ownership of the copyright of their recorded material. The first of these contracts was done in 1993 for the reissue of Billy Bragg's Back To Basics compilation.

Since then, Bragg has re-engaged with Cooking Vinyl a total of six times, most recently in 2013 for the release of studio album Tooth And Nail.

Cooking Vinyl has provided similar services for Alison Moyet, Black Spiders, Gary Numan, James Skelly & The Intenders, Madness, Pigeon Detectives, Reverend and The Makers, Ron Sexsmith, and The View.

=== 2000–2010 ===
In 2009, Cooking Vinyl partnered on the release of The Prodigy's fifth studio album Invaders Must Die, which went on to sell 1.2 million units worldwide and was the biggest-selling independent record of the year in Europe.

In 2012, Amanda Palmer, an advocate of the DIY approach, announced that she was partnering with Cooking Vinyl in a distribution and label services deal for the European release of her studio album Theatre Is Evil. The album was funded through a high-profile Kickstarter campaign that raised over $1.2 million in 30 days.

Also released in 2012 was Marilyn Manson's Born Villain under a joint-venture partnership between Manson's own label Hell, etc. and Cooking Vinyl. The album was a global success charting at No. 5 in Germany, No. 10 in the US, and topping Billboard's Hard Rock and Independent albums charts. In the UK, Manson reached No. 14 in the UK Albums Chart and No. 1 in the UK Rock Albums Chart.

=== 2011–2020 ===
2014 saw the return of Embrace and their self-titled album, which debuted in the UK Albums Chart at No. 5. In the same year, New York rockers The Pretty Reckless reached No. 8, with their second studio album.

In 2015, the Prodigy released their album The Day Is My Enemy, which reached number 1 on the chart, and was certified gold in the UK.

In 2016, Passenger claimed the UK No. 1 album with Young As The Morning, Old As The Sea. This year also saw singer-songwriter Nina Nesbitt sign a global artist services deal with Cooking Vinyl.

In 2018, Lucy Spraggan, former contestant on The X Factor, signed to both Cooking Vinyl Records and Publishing on a long-term global artist services deal.

Cooking Vinyl has long relationships with many of its artists. The Pixies' Charles Thompson was signed in 2000 and has had 17 releases to date with the label as Frank Black and Black Francis.

Since 1994, former Doll By Doll man Jackie Leven has had 23 releases, five of them in 2009.

Other artists that have released through the label in the 2010s include Counting Crows, Ryan Adams, Suzanne Vega, The Cult, The Charlatans, The Cranberries, Richard Ashcroft (CV licensed the Righteous Phonographic released album These People, with Ashcroft going on to be signed by BMG), The Subways, Echo and the Bunnymen, Gary Numan, The Enemy, Groove Armada, The Proclaimers, Seth Lakeman, UB40 and The Dropkick Murphys.

=== 2021–present ===
In December 2021, Clare Grogan announced that the first Altered Images album in over 38 years would be released in August 2022 on Cooking Vinyl and called Mascara Streakz. The album has been recorded with Bobby Bluebell from The Bluebells and Bernard Butler, formerly of Suede and McAlmont & Butler.

As of December 2021, other artists signed to Cooking Vinyl include Alison Moyet, Eliza & The Delusionals, Lissie, Nina Nesbitt, The Orb, Will Young, Passenger, The Waterboys, BABYMETAL, Fickle Friends, Lucy Spraggan, Rumer, Sophie Ellis-Bextor, The Darkness, The Psychedelic Furs, Billy Bragg, Del Amitri, Kiefer Sutherland, Reverend And The Makers, Suzanne Vega, The Fratellis, The Rifles, and Willy Mason

== Sister companies ==
Essential Music & Marketing

In 2003, Vital Distribution's managing director Mike Chadwick teamed up with Cooking Vinyl's Martin Goldschmidt to launch Essential Music & Marketing, an independent distributor and service provider.

RED Distribution, the Sony Music UK artist and label services division, announced the acquisition of Essential Music and Marketing in March 2016. As part of this deal, a new company was launched, Red Essential, which is based at The Cooking Vinyl Group's West London offices. The company is now located in Farringdon.

CV America

Cooking Vinyl America was originally launched in 2012. In 2016, Howie Gabriel was named President. The US operation provides strategic services to the CV Group, including artist/label acquisition, marketing, distribution and business strategy. Cooking Vinyl America is based in New York City.

Cooking Vinyl Australia

Cooking Vinyl Australia was formed in September 2013. The stand-alone company is based in Melbourne and helmed by former Shock Records executives, Leigh Gruppetta and Stu Harvey, the label signs both local and international artists and represents the Cooking Vinyl Records roster in Australia and New Zealand under license. In February 2018, Sony Music Australia acquired a portion of Cooking Vinyl Australia.

Cooking Vinyl Publishing

Cooking Vinyl Publishing was formed in 2008 and is headed by former manager and Warner/Chappell exec Ryan Farley, who joined in August 2018. The company has a diverse roster with current writers including Tom Speight, C Duncan, Vitto Meirelles, Isobel Campbell, Lucy Spraggan, 485C, 65 Days of Static and Palestinian acts DAM, 47 Soul and Le Trio Joubran.

The company's catalogue includes songs by artists such as Reverend & The Makers, The Rifles, Amber Run, Roll Deep, Meursalt, Tal National, Audio Bullys, Exit Calm and The Virgin Marys. It also has co-publishing partnerships with Brighton-based Fat Cat Records and UK jazz label Edition Music.

Motus Music

In March 2019, The Cooking Vinyl Group announced they had acquired a 50% share in production music start up Motus Music.

== Artists ==
=== Current ===
- A
- 47Soul
- '68
- Adam Cohen
- Area 11
- Ali Campbell
- Alison Moyet
- Amanda Palmer
- Babymetal
- Billy Bragg
- Black Spiders
- Blue
- The Bronx
- Callum Beattie
- Calling All Cars
- Camper Van Beethoven
- Carl Barât and The Jackals
- Chas & Dave
- City and Colour
- DAM
- D.A.R.K.
- The Darkness
- Deacon Blue
- Deap Vally
- Del Amitri
- Embrace
- Elles Bailey
- Fantastic Negrito
- Feeder
- Fickle Friends
- Frank Black
- The Fratellis
- Gary Numan
- Giraffe Tongue Orchestra
- Goldie
- Grand Duchy
- Isobell Campbell
- Jon Fratelli
- John Wheeler
- Kate Miller-Heidke
- Katherine Priddy
- The King Blues
- Lamb
- Lawson
- The Lemonheads
- Le Trio Joubran
- Lewis Watson
- Lissie
- Lucy Spraggan
- Madness
- Maxïmo Park
- Mexrrissey
- Nina Nesbitt
- Noah Gundersen
- The Orb
- Passenger
- Paul Kelly
- The Proclaimers
- Professor Green
- The Psychedelic Furs
- Reverend and The Makers
- Richard Ashcroft
- The Rifles
- Roger Waters
- Ron Sexsmith
- Röyksopp
- Seether
- Seth Lakeman
- Shed Seven
- Sophie Ellis-Bextor
- Starsailor
- The Subways
- Saint Raymond
- Suzanne Vega
- Teddy Thompson
- Thea Gilmore
- thenewno2
- The Travelling Band
- TLC
- Turin Brakes
- The Virginmarys
- The Waterboys
- Will Young

=== Past ===
- Ac Acoustics
- Alex Chilton
- Andy White
- Ani DiFranco
- Audio Bullys
- Bauhaus
- Boiled in Lead
- Bob Mould
- Bruce Cockburn
- Cerebral Ballzy
- Chris Hillman
- Chuck Prophet
- Clannad
- Clem Snide
- Clive Gregson & Christine Collister
- Counting Crows
- Cowboy Junkies
- David Thomas
- Davy Spillane
- Dawn Landes
- Die Goldenen Zitronen
- The Dillinger Escape Plan
- Dropkick Murphys
- Flaco Jiménez
- Get Cape. Wear Cape. Fly
- Goats Don't Shave
- Grant Lee Phillips
- Great Big Sea
- Groove Armada
- Hanson
- Hayseed Dixie
- HIM
- Howling Bells
- Idlewild
- Jackie Leven
- James
- Janis Ian
- June Tabor
- Killing Joke
- Loudbomb
- Luka Bloom
- Marilyn Manson
- Michael Messer
- Michael Nesmith
- Michelle Shocked
- Nina Nesbitt
- Nitin Sawhney
- Ocean Colour Scene
- Oysterband
- Prolapse
- Pulp
- Richard Thompson
- Roll Deep
- Rory McLeod
- Ryan Adams
- Skindred
- Stephen Duffy
- Sweet Honey in the Rock
- The Blackout
- The Bongos
- The Charlatans
- The Church
- The Cranberries
- The Cult
- The Dave Graney Show
- The Enemy
- The Jolly Boys
- The Lilac Time
- The Mekons
- The Nightingales
- The Pigeon Detectives
- The Pretty Reckless
- The Prodigy
- The Ukrainians
- The Undertones
- The Wannadies
- The View
- They Might Be Giants
- Tom Robinson
- Turbonegro
- T.V. Smith
- Underworld
- Velvet Crush
- Violent Femmes
- Weddings Parties Anything
- XTC
- Ziggy Marley

== See also ==
- List of record labels
