= Lifetime (Tobiahs song) =

Single by Tobiahs

from the album To You by Us (Vol. 1)
- Released: 12 January 2024
- Recorded: 2023
- Length: 2:38
- Label: Mushroom
- Songwriters: Tobiahs Fakhri; Timothy Maxey; John Scherer
- Producers: Fakhri; Nikki Katiforis

Tobiahs singles chronology
"Hurt This Bad" (2023)	"Lifetime" (2024)	"Alone" (2024)

Music video
- "Lifetime" on YouTube

"Lifetime" is a song by Australian electronic dance music producer Tobiahs, released through Mushroom Group on 12 January 2024, as the third single from his debut extended play, To You by Us (Vol. 1) (2025). The song samples "Paradise" by Not the Twos.

"Lifetime" was nominated for Most Performed Dance/Electronic Work at the 2025 APRA Awards. It peaked at numbers 5 and 16 on the ARIA Top 20 Dance Singles and the ARIA Top 20 Australian Artist Singles Charts, respectively.

== Critical reception ==
Spots Playlists said "It's a massive groundswell, rightly summoned by the undeniable allure of this driving, club-ready track... "Lifetime" oozes with confidence and maturity, testament to the young producer's accomplished style."

== Track listings ==
Digital download/streaming

1. "Lifetime" – 2:38
2. "Lifetime" (extended) – 3:28

Digital download/streaming

1. "Lifetime" (Kassin remix) – 5:21

== Charts ==
Weekly chart performance for "Lifetime"
Chart (2024)	Position
Australian Dance Singles (ARIA)	5
Australian Artist Singles (ARIA)	16

== Certifications ==
Region	Certification	Certified units/sales
Australia (ARIA)	Platinum	70,000^{‡}
^{‡} Sales+streaming figures based on certification alone.
