= Do What Ya Wanna =

Studio album by Beddy Rays
- Released: 18 April 2025
- Length: 33:31
- Label: Beddy Rays; ADA

Beddy Rays chronology
Beddy Rays (2022)	Do What Ya Wanna (2025)

Singles from Do What Ya Wanna
- 1. "Silverline" Released: 9 March 2024; 2. "Hold On" Released: 21 June 2024; 3. "Stay the Same" Released: 15 November 2024; 4. "Red Lights" Released: 14 February 2025; 5. "Pocket Rocket" Released: 18 Apri 2025

Do What Ya Wanna is the second studio album from Australian rock group, Beddy Rays. The album was announced in February 2025, alongside the forth single "Red Lights". It was released on 18 April 2025.

Upon announcement, vocalist Jackson Van Issum said: "Writing it was a way to make sense of all the craziness life throws at you, but it's also about not taking yourself too seriously and enjoying the ride. That's what Beddy Rays is all about."

The album will be supported by an Australian tour, commencing in Melbourne on 1 August 2025.

== Reception ==
Professional ratings
Review scores
Source	Rating
Kerrang!	4/5

James MacKinnon from Kerrang! said "Do What You Wanna touches on losing loved ones, alienation and self-destructive patterns. It finds Beddy Rays, whose members have been mates since the school playground, attempting to face up to some of life's hard truths without losing their mischievous side."

Jonah Taylor from The Live Wire said the group sound "better than ever" saying "In this latest record, Jacko, Brad, Benny and Lewy tackle themes of mateship, mental health, and self-discovery with a sincerity that feels both genuine and down-to-earth. The overall message emphasises that being surrounded by the people and places you love is the remedy for life's struggles."

== Track listing ==
Do What Ya Wanna track listing
No.	Title	Length
1.	"All I Wanna Do"	2:50
2.	"A Million Times"	3:37
3.	"Red Lights"	2:28
4.	"Fender"	3:17
5.	"Pocket Rocket"	2:14
6.	"Vices"	2:36
7.	"Silverline"	2:22
8.	"Big Brekky"	3:10
9.	"Killing Time"	3:21
10.	"Hold On"	3:10
11.	"Stay the Same"	4:26
Total length:		33:31

== Charts ==
Chart performance for Do What Ya Wanna
Chart (2025)	Peak position
Australian Albums (ARIA)	15
