= 1300 (group) =

Australian band

- Origin: Sydney, New South Wales, Australia
- Genre: Alternative hip-hop
- Years active: 2020–present
- Labels: Warner Music Australia, Eastern Margins, Jaded
- Members: DALI; goyo; Nerdie; pokari; rako

1300 (pronounced "one three hundred") are an Australian 5-piece alternative hip-hop group from West Sydney.

They released their debut studio album, Foreign Language in April 2022.

In June 2025, the group released "BANGALANG" under the LA-based label, Jaded.

== History ==
=== 2020–present: Formation and Foreign Language ===
Prior to 1300, several of the members were in another collective called Aisleland. They met at a listening party for an EP by Yura.

The group released their debut single "Brr" in January 2021, which was followed by "No Caller ID" and "Smashmouth" in the same year.

They released their debut studio album, Foreign Language in April 2022. In a positive review, NME's David James Young said "1300 have come out of the gate with a project that should propel them beyond their immediate bubble of Australian hip-hop – and possibly into the list of Australian artists who've put out the best music of 2022."

On 10 February 2023, the group released the mix tape <3 (pronounced "less than three").

On 1 February 2024, the group announced the release of their second mixtape, George, under London-based label Eastern Margins and released the single "Ape Sh*t".

On June 6, 2025, the group released their new single "BANGALANG" under their new label and management company, Jaded.

== Discography ==
=== Albums ===
List of Albums, with selected details
Title	Details
Foreign Language	Released: 29 April 2022; Format: Digital; Label: ADA (Warner Music Australia)

=== Mixtapes ===
List of mixtapes, with selected details
Title	Details
<3	Released: 10 February 2023; Format: Digital; Label: Self-released
George	Scheduled: 4 April 2024; Format: Digital; Label: Eastern Margins

== Awards and nominations ==
=== Australian Music Prize ===
The Australian Music Prize (the AMP) is an annual award of $30,000 given to an Australian band or solo artist in recognition of the merit of an album released during the year of award. It exists to discover, reward and promote new Australian music of excellence.

Year	Nominee / work	Award	Result	Ref.
2022	Foreign Language	Australian Music Prize	Nominated	

=== J Awards ===
The J Awards are an annual series of Australian music awards that were established by the Australian Broadcasting Corporation's youth-focused radio station Triple J. They commenced in 2005.

Year	Nominee / work	Award	Result	Ref.
2021	1300	Unearthed Artist of the Year	Nominated	
2022	"oldboy" by 1300 (directed by Raghav Rampal)	Australian Video of the Year	Won	

=== National Live Music Awards ===
The National Live Music Awards (NLMAs) commenced in 2016 to recognise contributions to the live music industry in Australia.

Year	Nominee / work	Award	Result	Ref.
2023	1300	Best Hip Hop Act	Nominated	
2023	1300	Best Live Act in NSW	Nominated	
