= Eliza & the Delusionals =

Australian indie rock music group

- Origin: Gold Coast, Queensland, Australia
- Genres: Indie rock, alternative rock
- Years active: 2015–present
- Label: Cooking Vinyl Australia
- Members: Eliza Klatt; Kurt Skuse; Ruby Lee
- Past members: Joe Bon MacPhail; Ashley Martin
- Website: www.elizaandthedelusionals.com

Eliza & the Delusionals are an Australian indie rock music group from the Gold Coast, Queensland that formed in 2015. Since 2023, the band has consisted of the eponymous Eliza Klatt (vocals, guitar), Kurt Skuse (guitar) and Ruby Lee (bass). The band have released two studio albums to date: Now and Then (2019) and Make It Feel Like the Garden (2021). They have toured both nationally and internationally with acts such as Silversun Pickups, The Front Bottoms, The Snuts, Peach Pit, Trophy Eyes, Killing Heidi and Luca Brasi.

== Career ==
Eliza Klatt formed the band in 2015. Over the next few years, they worked with producer Konstantin Kersting on a handful of singles, resulting in the band's extended play (EP) The Deeper End, released independently in 2017, which attracted attention on Triple J and community radio around the country.

In 2019, the group's overseas profile increased with the release of the single "Just Exist", their first release through Cooking Vinyl Australia. The group released the EP A State of Living in an Objective Reality in March 2020.

In February 2022, Eliza & the Delusionals released "Give You Everything", the lead single from the band's debut album, Now and Then.

On 21 March 2024, the band released the single "Make It Feel Like the Garden". On 21 May 2024, they released the single "Falling for You", along with the announcement of their second album Make It Feel Like the Garden, which was released on 19 July 2024.

On 21 August 2026, the band released the single "Ever". On 2 October 2026, they released the single "Dog", and announced that the EP Heaven would be released in early 2027.

== Members ==
Current members

- Eliza Klatt – lead vocals, rhythm guitar (2015–present)
- Kurt Skuse – lead guitar (2023–present), backing vocals (2015–present), bass (2015–2018), rhythm guitar (2018–2023)
- Ruby Lee – bass, backing vocals (2020–present)

Former members

- Joe Bon MacPhail – drums (2015–2018)
- Ashley "Tex" Martin – lead guitar (2015–2023)

== Discography ==
=== Studio albums ===
List of studio albums, with selected chart positions shown
Title	Album details	Peak chart positions
Title	Album details	AUS Vinyl
Now and Then	Released: 20 May 2022; Label: Cooking Vinyl Australia (CVLP111); Formats: LP, CD, digital download	15
Make It Feel Like the Garden	Released: 19 July 2024; Label: Cooking Vinyl Australia (CVLP143); Formats: LP, digital download	—

=== Extended plays ===
List of EPs, with selected details
Title	Details
The Time Spent on the Inside	Released: 15 January 2016; Format: CD, digital download; Label: Eliza & the Delusionals
The Deeper End	Released: 26 October 2017; Format: Digital download; Label: Eliza & the Delusionals
A State of Living in an Objective Reality	Released: 20 March 2020; Format: Digital download; Label: Eliza & the Delusionals, Cooking Vinyl Australia
Heaven	Scheduled: 2027; Format: Digital download; Label: Eliza & the Delusionals

== Awards and nominations ==
=== J Awards ===
The J Awards are an annual series of Australian music awards that were established by the Australian Broadcasting Corporation's youth-focused radio station Triple J. They commenced in 2005.

Year	Nominee / work	Award	Result	Ref.
2022	Now and Then	Australian Album of the Year	Nominated	

=== Queensland Music Awards ===
The Queensland Music Awards (previously known as Q Song Awards) are annual awards celebrating Queensland, Australia's brightest emerging artists and established legends. They commenced in 2006.

Year	Nominee / work	Award	Result (wins only)	Ref.
2020	"Just Exist"	Rock Song of the Year	Won	

=== Rolling Stone Australia Awards ===
The Rolling Stone Australia Awards are awarded annually in January or February by the Australian edition of Rolling Stone magazine for outstanding contributions to popular culture in the previous year.

Year	Nominee / work	Award	Result	Ref.
2023	Eliza & The Delusionals	Best New Artist	Nominated	
