= Beddy Rays =

Australian punk rock band

- Origin: Redland Bay, Queensland, Australia
- Genres: Punk rock; surf rock
- Years active: 2017–present
- Members: Jackson Van Issum Lewis McKenna Bradley O'Connor Benjamin Wade

Beddy Rays are an Australian rock band from the outer Brisbane suburb of Redland Bay, Queensland. With music described as "rollicking coastal punk rock", they are best known for their 2020 single "Sobercoaster". The band have supported Tones and I on tour, as well as Dune Rats and Hockey Dad.

== Origins ==
The four band members originally met in 2002 as young children at primary school. Their band name is derived from a spoonerism of "Reddy Bay", which is a common abbreviation for Redland Bay. In primary school the entire band's favourite band was Green Day. In high school they went through a phase of loving hardcore music and would attend shows at the youth centre shows.

The band was started after the members left high school. Their first show they played was at a party at Van Issum's house while his parents were away.

All four band members are from Redland Bay, including Van Issum who is a Woppaburra man, and work as tradesmen. Beddy Rays came to play some of their first shows by networking at various Brisbane venues for which they worked as tradies.

== Career ==
=== 2017–present: Career beginnings ===
Beddy Rays released their first EP Lost Found Beat Around in 2017. Their 2020 single "Sobercoaster" led the band to be featured as a Triple J Unearthed Feature Artist in mid-2020.

In 2021, Beddy Rays covered Thelma Plum's "Better In Blak" for Triple J's Like A Version segment.

On 19 November 2021, the band released "On My Own".

Their self-titled, debut studio album was announced on 2 June 2022 and was released on 29 July 2022. It peaked at number 8 on the ARIA Charts. The Beddy Rays album cover art was inspired by Green Day’s Dookie cover.

In September 2022, it was reported that there was a sexual assault in the mosh pit at a Beddy Ray's concert. The band drove the woman that had been assaulted home and had the perpetrator kicked out of the Hobart venue and banned for life.

In February 2025, Beddy Rays announced their second studio album Do What Ya Wanna, which was released on 18 April 2025.

== Members ==
- Jackson "Jacko" Van Issum – lead vocals, guitar
- Lewis "Lewy" McKenna – guitar, backing vocals
- Bradley O'Connor – bass, backing vocals
- Benjamin Wade – drums, percussion, backing vocals
- Tom Bowie – occasional live guitar

== Discography ==
=== Studio albums ===
List of studio albums, with release date and label shown
Title	Details	Peak chart positions
Title	Details	AUS
Beddy Rays	Released: 29 July 2022; Label: Beddy Rays (BR001); Format: CD, LP, CS, digital download, streaming	8
Do What Ya Wanna	Released: 18 April 2025; Label: Beddy Rays, ADA Global; Format: LP, CS, digital download, streaming	15

=== Extended plays ===
Title	Details	Peak chart positions
Title	Details	AUS
Lost Found Beat Around	Released: 8 December 2017; Label: Beddy Rays; Format: Digital download, streaming	—
Sunday Slowdown	Released: 8 May 2026; Label: Beddy Rays; Format: Digital download, streaming	50

=== Singles ===
List of singles
Title	Year	Certifications	Album
"Coming Home"	2017		Lost Found Beat Around
"Fool Around"	2017		Lost Found Beat Around
"Bloodhound"	2019		Non-album singles
"Kicked"	2019		Non-album singles
"Sobercoaster"	2020	ARIA: Platinum	Beddy Rays
"Better Weather"	2020		Non-album single
"Wait a While"	2021		Beddy Rays
"Week on Repeat"	2021		Beddy Rays
"Better in Blak (Triple J Like a version)	2021		Non-album single
"On My Own"	2021		Beddy Rays
"Milk"	2022		Beddy Rays
"Sort It Out"	2022		Beddy Rays
"Handful"	2022		Beddy Rays
"Rhythms"	2023		TBA
"Bored"	2023		TBA
"Too Much (Is Too Much)"	2023		TBA
"Silverline"	2024		Do What Ya Wanna
"Hold On"	2024		Do What Ya Wanna
"Stay the Same"	2024		Do What Ya Wanna
"Red Lights"	2025		Do What Ya Wanna
"Pocket Rocket"	2025		Do What Ya Wanna
"Khe Sanh (Triple J Like a version)	2025		Non-album single

=== Other appearances ===
List of non-singles album appearances
Title	Year	Album
"Red Hot Chrissy"	2024	How to Make Gravy

== Awards and nominations ==
=== ARIA Music Awards ===
The ARIA Music Awards is an annual awards ceremony that recognises excellence, innovation, and achievement across all genres of Australian music. They commenced in 1987.

Year	Nominee / work	Award	Result	Ref.
2022	Beddy Rays	Michael Gudinski Breakthrough Artist	Nominated	

=== National Indigenous Music Awards ===
The National Indigenous Music Awards recognise excellence, innovation and leadership among Aboriginal and Torres Strait Islander musicians from throughout Australia. They commenced in 2004.

Year	Nominee / work	Award	Result	Ref.
2021	Beddy Rays	New Artist of the Year	Nominated	
2023	Beddy Rays	Album of the Year	Nominated	

=== Queensland Music Awards ===
The Queensland Music Awards (previously known as Q Song Awards) are annual awards celebrating Queensland, Australia's brightest emerging artists and established legends. They commenced in 2006.

Year	Nominee / work	Award	Result (wins only)	Ref.
2025	"Stay the Same"	Rock Award	Won	
