= Pete Lawrence =

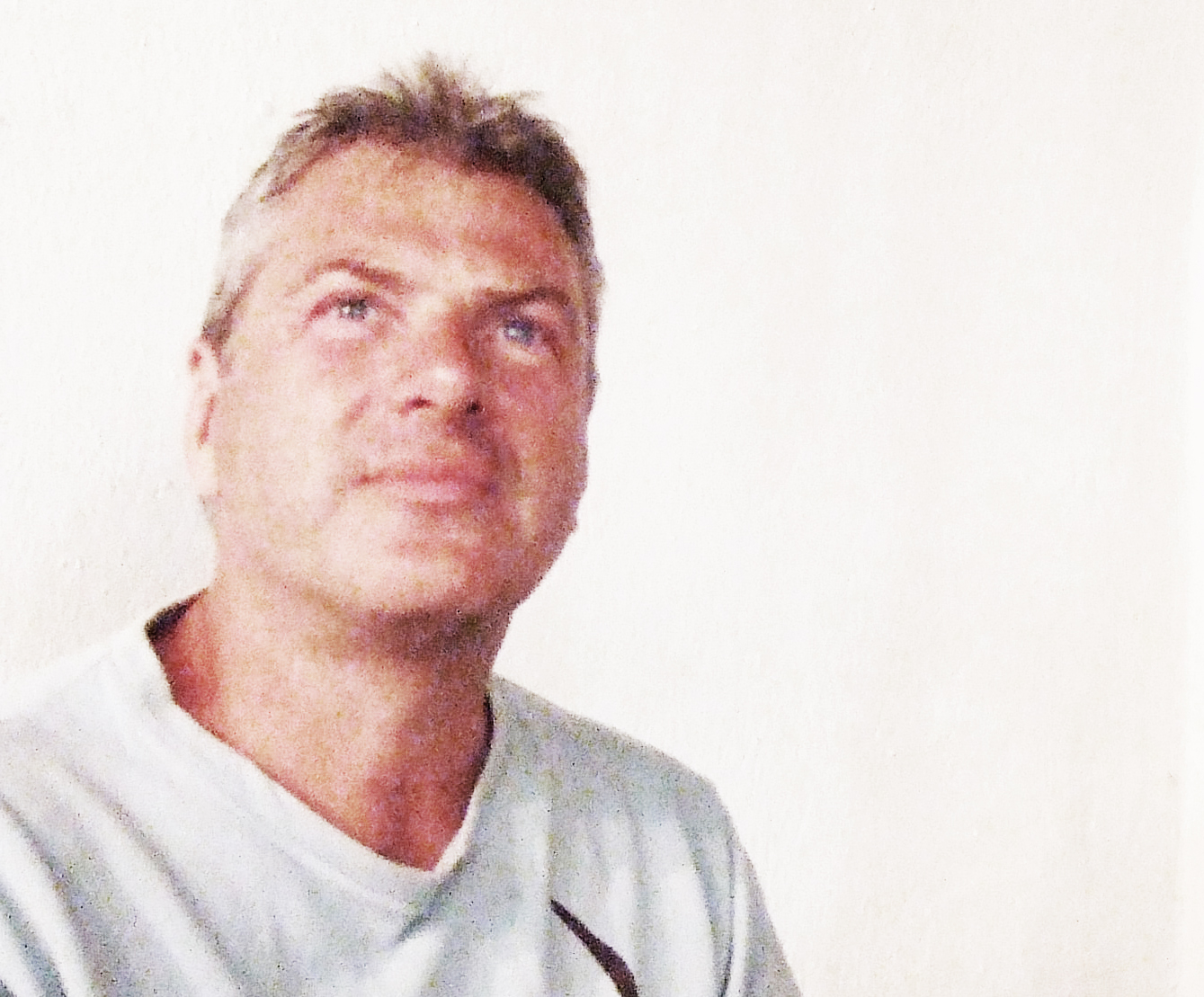
- Pete Lawrence in 2008

Background information
- Origin: Leamington Spa, England
- Genres: Ambient; Electronica; Chillout
- Occupations: DJ, event organiser, musician, music programmer
- Years active: 1986 – present
- Labels: Big Chill Recordings; Cooking Vinyl
- Website: http://www.petelawrence.net/

Pete Lawrence is a British social entrepreneur, recording artist, DJ, event organiser, music programmer writer and broadcaster based in the UK.

== Background ==
Lawrence created the concept for The Big Chill in February 1994, originally as a new type of Sunday multimedia club. With his partner at the time, Katrina Larkin, he put together a multi-faceted eight-hour event. It was the first London club to have its own website and to offer free internet access and was initially noted for its ambient and downtempo soundtrack, contributing to the development of the chill out' boom at the turn of the Millennium.

This "festival in a club" concept adapted relatively easily to an outdoors setting and in 1995 Pete Lawrence and Katrina Larkin staged the first Big Chill Festival, reaching a capacity of 35,000 by 2007 as one of the top UK festivals. He was also instrumental in taking The Big Chill concept to several locations worldwide in collaboration with the British Council.

Lawrence was also involved in The Big Chill's expansion into opening London venues. The Big Chill Bar in Brick Lane, was followed in autumn 2006 with the three-story Big Chill House in Kings Cross as well as releasing his own recording project Chilled By Nature. It included a number of EPs, one-off tracks and collaborations, live performances at The Big Chill festival, and the debut album Under One Sun.

In the mid 80s, he established the Cooking Vinyl label and recorded The Texas Campfire Tapes with singer-songwriter Michelle Shocked which went to No 1 in the UK Independent album charts. He co-edited the book Crossfade - a Big Chill Anthology (Serpents Tail). In December 2007, Pete Lawrence and Katrina Larkin were voted into Time Out's Top 100 'movers and shakers'. Lawrence stood down as a director and shareholder of Chillfest (The Big Chill) in February 2008.

In September 2017, Lawrence's new project Campfire Convention launched as a social network and membership-based events community.

Campfire's first outdoor Convention was in August 2016 in Michaelchurch Escley, Herefordshire which included keynote addresses from their patron Brian Eno and peace activist Scilla Elworthy as well as panels, thinkshops, music, art and yoga.
