= Civilians (record label) =

Independent record label based in Melbourne, Australia

- Founded: 2013
- Founder: Stu Harvey and Leigh Gruppetta
- Status: Active
- Distributor: The Orchard
- Genre: Indie rock; Alternative rock; Metal; Country; Americana; Hardcore punk
- Country of origin: Australia
- Location: Melbourne
- Official website: civilians.co

Civilians is an independent record label based in Melbourne, Australia. Founded in 2013 by co-managing directors Leigh Grupetta and Stu Harvey in partnership with Martin Goldschmidt, Civilians was originally known as Cooking Vinyl Australia.

After eleven years operating as Cooking Vinyl Australia, they unveiled a new name in September 2024, one that removed any lingering confusion about their connection with Martin Goldschmidt's lauded U.K. label Cooking Vinyl.

Civilians boasts a diverse domestic roster including the likes of Jem Cassar-Daley, Emma Donovan, Ceres, Jenny Mitchell, Luca Brasi, Parkway Drive, King Stingray, The Southern River Band and Windwaker. They also supply label services to various partners both internationally and domestically, including Thirty Tigers, Run For Cover, Counter Intuitive Records, Blue Grape, Equal Vision, SO Recordings, Greyscale and Dine Alone handling marketing and distribution throughout Australia and New Zealand.

== History ==
=== 2013–2023 ===
After working together at Shock records, Leigh Gruppetta and Stu Harvey founded Civilians (formerly known as Cooking Vinyl Australia) in 2013, in a partnership with Martin Goldschmidt, the London-based Cooking Vinyl Group Founder & CEO.

In 2018, Civilians partnered with Sony Music Australia with Sony making "a significant investment" in the Indie label. As part of the arrangement, Cooking Vinyl Australia's recordings would be distributed globally through Sony's distributor and label services company The Orchard.

"We are thrilled about what the future holds as we enter this next phase of the business" - Leigh Gruppetta, The Music Network, 2018

From 2022 - 2024 Civilians signed numerous Australian acts including the likes of Melbourne/Naarm based band CIVIC, alternative rock band, Jebediah, and Perth rockers The Southern River Band.

=== 2024–present ===
In September 2024, after eleven years operating as Cooking Vinyl Australia, the Melbourne-based label rebranded as Civilians, unveiling a new name and look to remove any confusion regarding their association with Cooking Vinyl UK.

“It's a new name, a renewed focus but the same us,” says Gruppetta of Civilians, in a statement. “We remain committed to everything that has driven our growth over the past 11 years.”

Following the rebrand, Civilians continued to expand its operations. In September 2025, the label announced a partnership with US independent record label Equal Vision Records to represent its roster in Australia.

== Label partners ==
Civilians works with a variety of international and domestic label partners to release and promote music in Australia and New Zealand. These include:

- Bargain Bin
- Blue Grape Music
- Counter Intuitive Records
- Dine Alone Records
- Equal Vision Records
- Greyscale Records
- Run For Cover Records
- SO Recordings
- Thirty Tigers
- Wax Bodega

== Artists ==
=== Current ===
- Baroness
- Ceres
- Emma Donovan & the Putbacks
- Hands Like Houses
- High Tension
- Jem Cassar-Daley
- Jenny Mitchell
- King Stingray
- Luca Brasi
- Parkway Drive
- The Southern River Band
- Tyler Richardson
- Windwaker

=== Past ===
- Boydos
- Calling All Cars
- Civic
- Elizabeth Fader
- Eliza & the Delusionals
- Endless Heights
- Fanny Lumsden
- Ivan Ooze
- Jebediah
- Johnny Hunter
- Kate Miller-Heidke
- Mike Noga
- PUP
- Sarah Wolfe
- STUMPS
- The Chats
- Tracy McNeil & the Goodlife

== See also ==
- Cooking Vinyl UK (UK, 1986–); founded by former manager and booking agent Martin Goldschmidt and business partner Pete Lawrence in Acton, London, England in 1986.
- List of record labels
- Sony Music Australia (Australia, 2004–); operated by American parent company Sony Music Entertainment
- The Orchard (US, 1997–); founded by Scott Cohen and Richard Gottehrer in New York City. A subsidiary of Sony Music, the company specialises in media distribution, marketing and sales across music and entertainment.
