= Rex Orange County discography =

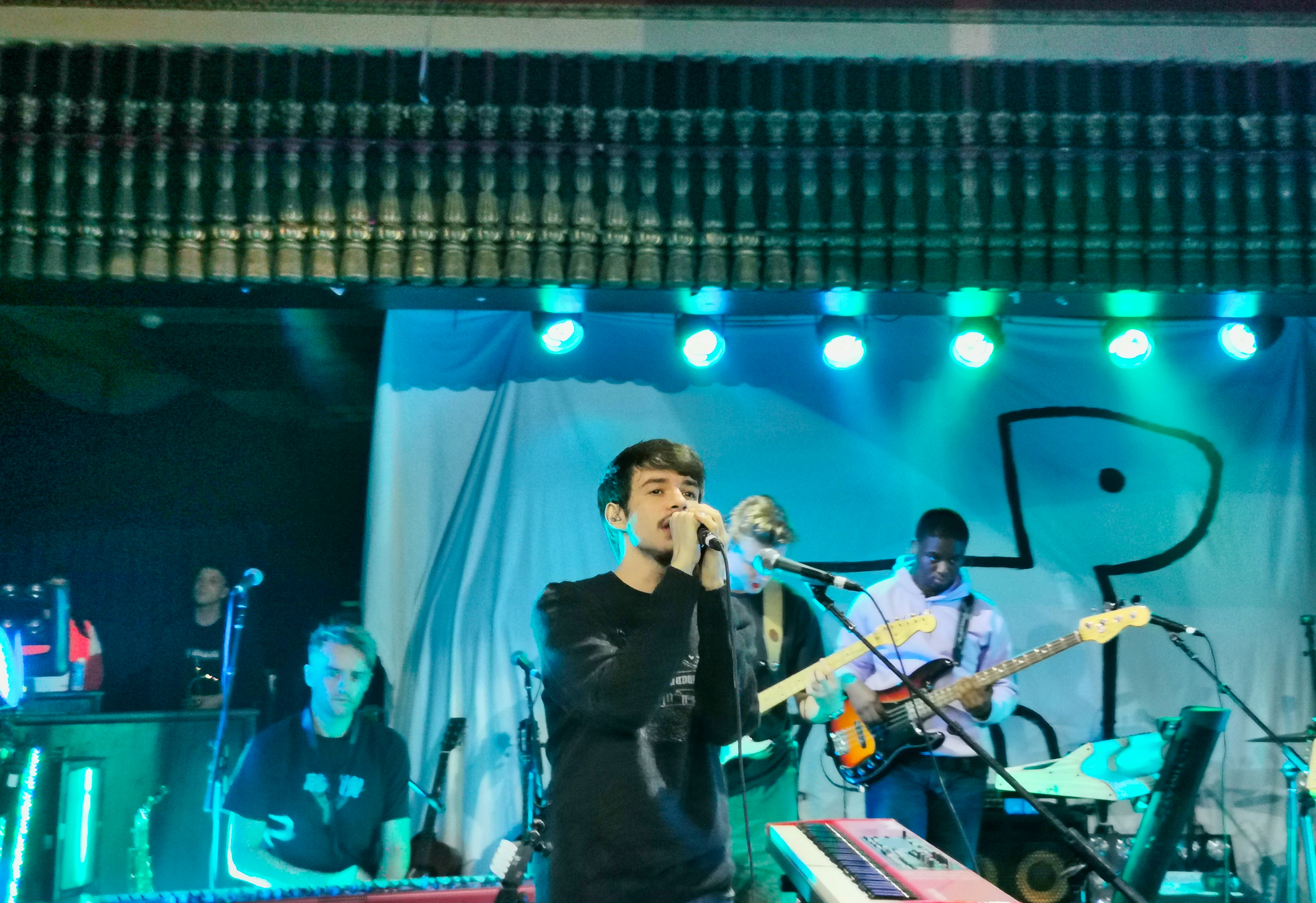
- Rex Orange County in 2019
- Studio albums: 6
- Live albums: 1
- Singles: 24
- Music videos: 11

The discography of the English musician Rex Orange County consists of six studio albums, one live album, twenty-four singles (including two as a featured artist) and eleven music videos.

Rex Orange County released his debut studio album, Bcos U Will Never B Free, free of charge on Bandcamp and Soundcloud in 2015. The album was later officially released to streaming services in 2016. The album was supported by its lead single, "Corduroy Dreams", which received a Silver certification from the British Phonographic Industry, and its second single, "Japan". Between 2016 and 2017, Rex Orange County released the singles "Uno", and the RIAA-platinum certified singles, "Sunflower" and "Best Friend". His second studio album, Apricot Princess, was released in 2017, and was supported by the singles "Untitled" and "Never Enough". Rex Orange County then collaborated with the American rapper Tyler, the Creator, featuring on the songs "Foreword" and "Boredom" from Tyler's fourth studio album, Flower Boy (2017).

Following the release of Apricot Princess, Rex Orange County released the single "Loving is Easy", featuring Benny Sings, in 2017. He then released the single "New House" in 2019. The same year, he released his third studio album, and his first through a record label, Pony, on 25 October 2019, supported by the singles "10/10", the RIAA Platinum certified single "Pluto Projector", and "Face to Face". It debuted at number 3 on the US Billboard 200, becoming his most successful album in the country. On 30th September 2020, Rex Orange County released "Live at Radio City Music Hall", a live album. His fourth studio album, Who Cares?, was released in 2022, and was supported by three singles, "Keep It Up", "Amazing", and a collaboration with Tyler, the Creator, "Open a Window". It was his first number one album in the United Kingdom, and reached number five on the US Billboard 200.

His fifth studio album, The Alexander Technique, was released on 6 September 2024, and was supported by four singles: "Alexander" and "Guitar Song", which were released together to promote the album as it was announced; "The Table" on 6 August 2024; and "2008", released two days before the album. On 8 October 2024, Rex Orange County featured on a remix of Ravyn Lenae's "Love Me Not". On 22 December 2024, Rex Orange County released "Drama", a leftover from The Alexander Technique. On 14 February 2025, Rex Orange County released two songs with Daniel Caesar. On 9 September 2025, "Take a Drive" was released, which was co-produced by Pharrell Williams. On 19 August 2026, Rex Orange County released "Indecision", also featuring Caesar.

== Studio albums ==
List of studio albums, with selected details, chart positions and certifications
Title	Details	Peak chart positions							Certifications
Title	Details	UK	AUS	CAN	NZ	US	US Heat.	US Ind.	Certifications
Bcos U Will Never B Free	Released: 4 September 2015; Label: Self-released; Format: Digital download, streaming	— (Note: Bcos U Will Never B Free did not enter the UK Albums Chart, but peaked at 26 on the UK Albums Sales Chart.)	28	—	—	—	—	—	
Apricot Princess	Released: 26 April 2017; Label: Self-released; Format: Digital download, CD, vinyl, streaming	—	—	—	—	—	2	8	BPI: Silver
Pony	Released: 25 October 2019; Label: RCA; Format: Digital download, CD, vinyl, streaming	5	4	3	6	3	—	—	BPI: Silver
Who Cares?	Released: 11 March 2022; Label: RCA; Format: Digital download, CD, vinyl, streaming	1	2	16	1	5	—	—	
The Alexander Technique	Released: 6 September 2024; Label: RCA; Format: Digital download, CD, vinyl, streaming	15	77	—	—	151	—	—	
Dream Fatigue	Released: 6 November 2026; Label: AWAL; Formats: Digital download, CD, vinyl, streaming	18	—	—	—	—	—	—	
"—" denotes a recording that did not chart or was not released in that territory

== Singles ==
=== As lead artist ===
List of singles, with year released, selected chart positions and certifications, and album name shown
Title	Year	Peak chart positions									Certifications	Album
Title	Year	UK	UK Indie	BEL	NZ Hot	US Bub.	US Alt.	US Rock	US Rock Airplay	US AAA	Certifications	Album
"Corduroy Dreams"	2015	—	—	—	—	—	—	—	—	—	BPI: Silver; ARIA: Gold	Bcos U Will Never B Free
"Japan"	2015	—	—	—	—	—	—	—	—	—		Bcos U Will Never B Free
"Uno"	2016	—	—	—	—	—	—	—	—	—		Non-album singles
"Best Friend"	2017	—	—	—	—	—	—	—	—	—	BPI: Gold; ARIA: Platinum; RIAA: Platinum	Non-album singles
"Sunflower"	2017	—	—	—	—	—	—	—	—	—	BPI: Gold; ARIA: Platinum; RIAA: Platinum	Non-album singles
"Untitled"	2017	—	—	—	—	—	—	—	—	—		Apricot Princess
"Never Enough"	2017	—	—	—	—	—	—	—	—	—		Apricot Princess
"Edition"	2017	—	—	—	—	—	—	—	—	—		Non-album singles
"Loving Is Easy" (featuring Benny Sings)	2017	—	—	40	—	—	27	—	35	24	BPI: Platinum; ARIA: 2× Platinum; RIAA: 2× Platinum	Non-album singles
"You've Got a Friend in Me" (with Randy Newman)	2018	—	—	—	—	—	—	—	—	—		Non-album singles
"New House"	2019	—	47	—	19	—	—	40	—	—		Non-album singles
"10/10"	2019	68	—	—	22	—	9	6	27	25		Pony
"Pluto Projector"	2019	—	—	—	17	—	—	7	—	—	BPI: Silver; ARIA: Platinum; RIAA: Platinum	Pony
"Face to Face"	2019	86	—	—	15	—	—	8	—	—		Pony
"Keep It Up"	2022	95	—	—	24	—	16	21	—	29		Who Cares?
"Amazing"	2022	—	—	—	—	—	—	24	—	—	ARIA: Gold	Who Cares?
"Open a Window" (with Tyler, the Creator)	2022	89	—	—	7	16	—	15	—	—		Who Cares?
"Threat"	2022	—	—	—	18	—	—	29	—	—		Non-album single
"Alexander"	2024	—	—	—	—	—	—	—	—	—		The Alexander Technique
"Guitar Song"	2024	—	—	—	—	—	—	—	—	—		The Alexander Technique
"Rearrange My World" (with Daniel Caesar)	2025	—	—	—	11	11	—	14	—	—		Non-album singles
"There's a Field (That's Only Yours)" (with Daniel Caesar)	2025	—	—	—	17	—	—	24	—	—		Non-album singles
"Indecision" (with Daniel Caesar)	2026	—	—	—	16	—	—	49	—	—		Dream Fatigue
"Grandma Song"	2026	—	—	—	—	—	—	—	—	—		Dream Fatigue
"—" denotes a recording that did not chart or was not released in that territory

=== As featured artist ===
List of singles as featured artist, with selected chart positions
Title	Year	Peak chart positions		Albums
Title	Year	US R&B/HH Bub.	NZ Heat.	Albums
"Boredom" (Tyler, the Creator featuring Rex Orange County and Anna of the North)	2017	9	10	Flower Boy
"Forever Always" (Peter CottonTale featuring Rex Orange County, Chance the Rapper, Daniel Caesar, Madison Ryann Ward and Yebba)	2018	—	—	Non-album single
"—" denotes a recording that did not chart or was not released in that territory.

== Other charted and certified songs ==
List of other charted and certified songs, with selected chart positions
Title	Year	Peak chart positions							Certifications	Album
Title	Year	IDN	JPN Over.	MLY	NZ Hot	PHL	SGP	US Rock	Certifications	Album
"Television / So Far So Good"	2017	—	—	—	—	—	—	—	BPI: Silver	Apricot Princess
"Always"	2019	—	—	—	18	—	—	16		Pony
"It's Not The Same Anymore"	2019	—	—	—	—	—	—	—	ARIA: Gold	Pony
"Never Had the Balls"	2019	—	—	—	21	—	—	21		Pony
"Worth It"	2022	—	—	—	19	—	—	35		Who Cares?
"One in a Million"	2022	—	—	—	17	—	—	30		Who Cares?
"If You Want It"	2022	—	—	—	21	—	—	39		Who Cares?
"7AM"	2022	—	—	—	—	—	—	44		Who Cares?
"The Shade"	2022	11	—	10	—	3	12	38	ARIA: Gold	Who Cares?
"Making Time"	2022	—	—	—	—	—	—	48		Who Cares?
"2008"	2024	—	15	—	—	—	—	—		The Alexander Technique
"The Table"	2024	—	19	—	—	—	—	—		The Alexander Technique
"—" denotes a recording that did not chart or was not released in that territory

== Music videos ==
- "Japan" (2015) (produced by Gianluca Bottoni)
- "Sunflower" (2017) (produced by Illegal Civ Cinema)
- "Untitled" (2017) (directed by Alex O'Connor and Sam Hiscox)
- "Loving Is Easy" (2017) (directed by Chris Ullens)
- "10/10" (2019) (directed by Warren Fu)
- "KEEP IT UP" (2022) (directed by Alex O'Connor, Alexandra Waespi & Bráulio Amado)
- "AMAZING" (2022) (directed by Chris Ullens)
- "MAKING TIME" (2022) (directed by Bráulio Amado)
- "ONE IN A MILLION" (2022) (directed by Bráulio Amado)
- "Alexander" (2024) (directed by Nick Walker, produced by Wojciech Czarkowski)
- "Guitar Song" (2024) (directed by Alexandra Waespi)
- "The Table" (2024) (directed by Nick Walker)
- "Finally" (2024)
- "Indecision" (2026) (directed by Rhys Scarabosio)
