= Open a Window =

2022 single by Rex Orange County featuring Tyler, the Creator

"Open A Window"

Single by Rex Orange County featuring Tyler, the Creator

from the album Who Cares?
- Released: March 9, 2022
- Length: 3:39
- Label: RCA
- Songwriters: Alexander O'Connor, Tyler Okonma, Benny Sings
- Producers: Benny Sings, Rex Orange County

Rex Orange County featuring Tyler, the Creator singles chronology
"Amazing" (2022)	"Open A Window" (2022)	"Threat" (2022)

"Open A Window" is a song by English singer-songwriter Rex Orange County featuring American rapper Tyler, the Creator. It was released on March 9, 2022, as the third single from Rex Orange County's fourth studio album Who Cares?.

== Background and composition ==
"Open A Window" was the third collaboration between Rex Orange County and Tyler, the Creator. The two previously worked together on Tyler's 2017 album Flower Boy, where Rex Orange County appeared on the songs "Boredom" and "Foreword". The song was released during the promotion of Who Cares?, which followed Rex Orange County's 2019 album Pony. Before "Open A Window", he released "Keep It Up" and "Amazing" as singles from the album.

"Open a Window" is a jazzy song with a 1970s-inspired sound. The song begins with a prominent bassline, while light orchestration accompanies the track. Tyler, the Creator contributes a guest verse over Benny Sings' production. AllMusic described the song as evoking the sound of Stevie Wonder.

== Reception ==
Bobby Carter of NPR praised the bassline and Tyler's verse. Connie Burke of The Indiependent praised the song's relaxed sound and Tyler's verse. The Michigan Daily listed "Open a Window" among the more interesting tracks on Who Cares?, noting its instrumentation and Tyler's feature.

== Charts ==
Chart performance for "Open A Window"
Chart	Peak position
UK Singles Chart	89
NZ Hot Singles	7
US Bubbling Under Hot 100	16
US Hot Rock Songs	15
