= Istora Gelora Bung Karno =

Indoor Sports venue in Jakarta

Istana Olahraga Gelora Bung Karno
- Gelora Bung Karno Sport Palace
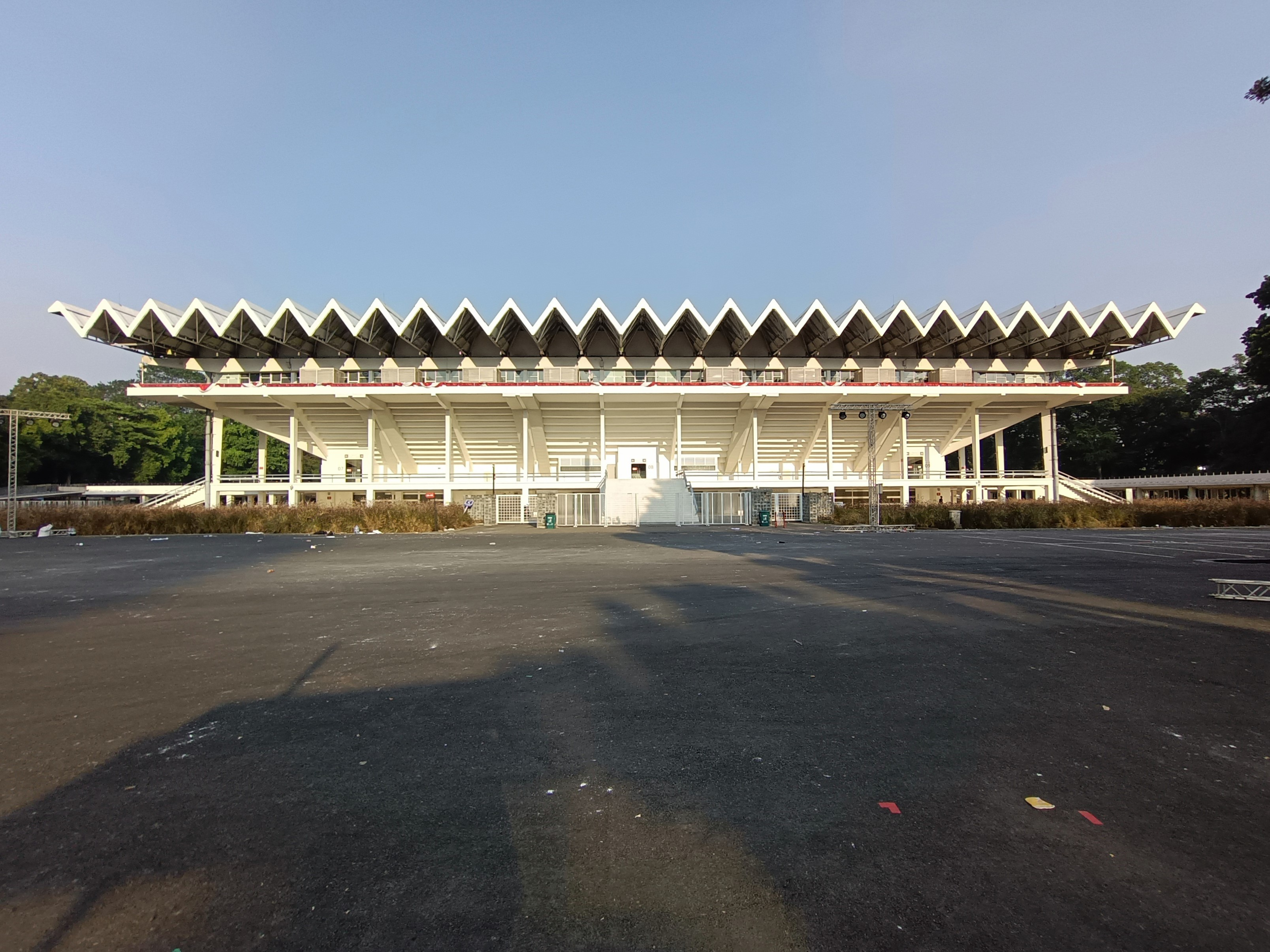
- Interactive map of Istana Olahraga Gelora Bung Karno
- Former names: Istana Olahraga Senayan (until 24 September 1962, 1969–2001)
- Location: Gelora, Tanah Abang, Central Jakarta
- Coordinates: 6°13′13.2″S 106°48′22.5″E
- Owner: Government of Indonesia (via Ministry of State Secretariat)
- Operator: Pusat Pengelolaan Komplek Gelora Bung Karno (Gelora Bung Karno Complex Management Center)
- Capacity: 10,000 (1962–2008); 9,500 (2008–2016); 7,166 (2018–present)
- Surface: Wood
- Scoreboard: Seiko
- Field size: 50 by 25 metres (55 by 27 yd)
- Public transit: Istora Mandiri; Senayan Bank Jakarta; Gerbang Pemuda

Construction
- Groundbreaking: 8 February 1960 (entire complex)
- Opened: 21 May 1961
- Renovated: 2016–2018
- Closed: 2016–2018
- Reopened: 23 January 2018
- Cost: $12,500,000 (1958, entire complex); Rp132 billion (2016–2018, equivalent to about US$10 million with the 2016 exchange rate)
- Architect: Friedrich Silaban (entire Gelora Bung Karno Sports Complex)

Tenants
- Badminton: Indonesia Open (since 1982); Indonesia Masters (since 2018); Basketball: Indonesia men's national basketball team

Website
- https://gbk.id/venue/istora-senayan-2/

Gelora Bung Karno Sports Palace (Indonesian: Istana Olahraga Gelora Bung Karno, abbreviated as Istora), (formerly named Istora Senayan between 1969 and 2001) is an indoor arena located in Gelora Bung Karno Sports Complex, Jakarta, Indonesia. The capacity of the arena after 2018 reopening is 7,166. This arena is usually used for badminton tournaments, especially the BWF tournaments Indonesia Open since 1982 and Indonesia Masters since 2018, as well as the Indonesia men's national basketball team. The first event that held in this arena was the 1961 Thomas Cup.

It was also used during the 1962 Asian Games and was renovated to host the 2018 edition. with its first post-renovation event was the 2018 Indonesia Masters. During the latter Games, it hosted the badminton and later stages of basketball events.

The arena originally was planned to stage the 2023 FIBA Basketball World Cup and becoming the only Indonesian venue in the three-country joint bid but was moved to a newly built arena inside the complex. It hosted the 2022 FIBA Asia Cup instead.

== History ==
As an architect and civil engineering graduate, Sukarno proposed a sports center location near M. H. Thamrin Boulevard and Menteng (Karet, Pejompongan, or Dukuh Atas) for the 1962 Asian Games. Then he was accompanied by Friedrich Silaban to review the location of the proposed sports complex by helicopter. Silaban disagreed with the selection of Dukuh Atas because he argued the construction of a sports complex in the center the future downtown area will potentially create a massive traffic congestion. Sukarno agreed Silaban recommendation and instead assigned the project to the Senayan area with an area of approximately 300 hectares.

The sports complex construction began on 8 February 1960, Istora construction finished on 21 May 1961, in time to host the 1961 Thomas Cup that held in June of that year.

During the New Order era, due to the de-Sukarnoization policy by military junta government under Suharto, the complex was renamed to Gelora Senayan Sports Complex and the Istora was also renamed to Istora Senayan in 1969. However, the name of the sports complex (and the Istora) was reverted by Indonesian president at the time Abdurrahman Wahid since 17 January 2001. although the Istora Senayan name is still used informally.

Istora had a U-shaped indoor lobby attached on its front since some time after the 1960s to 2016. The court and tribune were surrounded by multi-functional rooms. Those were demolished during the subsequent renovation. The rooms are incorporated underneath the tribune, leaving no other buildings attached to it.

The 2016 - 18 renovation of Istora for the 2018 Asian Games cost Rp132 billion (around US$10 million with the exchange rate at the time), reducing the capacity from 9,500 to around 7,000 spectators. During the latest renovation, there were already some delft blue single seats installed on the mid-section of west and east tribune along with yellow (4 corners) and green (mid-section of north and south tribune) wooden bleachers. Those were scrapped and replaced by single seats, consist of 3 shades of grey. However, to preserve the memory of the old Istora, there are five rows of seat using new all-brown wooden bleachers, placed near Gate 1.

== Entertainment events ==
=== 1961–1999 ===
Date	Artist(s)	Tour
10 March 1984	Uriah Heep	Head First
16–18 February 1988	Tina Turner	Break Every Rule World Tour
11–13 February 1992	New Kids on the Block	The Magic Summer Tour
17–20 September 1992	David Copperfield	David Copperfield: Magic for the 90's Tour
17 October 1995	Take That	Nobody Else Tour

=== 2000–2009 ===
Date	Artist(s)	Tour
4 April 2005	Avril Lavigne	Bonez Tour
23 February 2007	Muse	Black Holes and Revelations Tour
20 October 2007	Black Eyed Peas	Black Blue & You Tour
2 June 2009	The Pussycat Dolls	Doll Domination Tour
17 August 2009	The All-American Rejects	I Wanna Rock Tour

=== 2010–2019 ===
Date	Artist(s)	Tour
3 August 2010	Slash	2010 World Tour
29 October 2010	Simply Red	—
10 January 2011	N.E.R.D	—
22 January 2011	Ne-Yo	Libra Scale Tour
5 April 2011	Bruno Mars	The Doo-Wops & Hooligans Tour
27 April 2011	Maroon 5	Hands All Over Tour
17 January 2012	Simple Plan	Get Your Heart On! Tour
20 September 2012	The Wanted	Live in Jakarta
4 & 5 October 2022	Maroon 5	Overexposed Tour
24 March 2013	Demi Lovato	A Special Night with Demi Lovato
10 May 2013	Sigur Rós	World Tour 2013
12 March 2014	Avril Lavigne	The Avril Lavigne Tour
7 December 2014	JKT48	Papan Penanda Isi Hati – Message on a Placard Handshake Festival
28 March 2015	2PM	Go Crazy World Tour
22 May 2015	Boyzone	BZ20 Tour
4 June 2015	Pentatonix	On My Way Home Tour Day 2
19 March 2016	JKT48	Beginner Handshake Festival
1 March 2019	Kodaline	Politics of Living Tour
16 November 2019	Seventeen	Ode to You World Tour

=== 2020–present ===
Date	Artist(s)	Tour	Ref.
1 March 2020	NCT Dream	The Dream Show	
6 August 2022	JKT48	Heaven: 10th Anniversary Concert	
30 September - 1 October 2022	The Script	Greatest Hits Tour 2022	
10 December 2022	Treasure, Jun. K, Young Tak, Zion.T	Saranghaeyo Indonesia 2022	
16 January 2024	Yoasobi	Yoasobi Asia Tour 2023–2024	
5 October 2024	WayV	2024 Wayv Concert	
14–15 December 2024	Several artists	Trans Media 23rd Anniversary: Semangat Baru	
2 February 2025	Yura Yunita	Konser Bingah	
13 February 2025	Wave to Earth	0.03 World Tour	
26–27 February 2025	Yoasobi	Chō-genjitsu Asia Tour	
12 April 2025	BoyNextDoor	Knock On Vol.1 Tour	
5 November 2025	Nancy Ajram	Nancy Ajram Live in Jakarta	
9 November 2025	Maher Zain, Harris J	Indonesia Tour 2025	
18 July 2026	The Neighbourhood	Wourld Tour	
21 August 2026	IKon	iKON “FOUREVER” WORLD TOUR 2026	
21-22 November 2026	Doh Kyung-soo	DOH KYUNG SOO CONCERT TOUR [DAY OFF]	

=== Cancelled entertainment events ===
Date	Artist(s)	Tour	Cause	Notes	Ref.
14 November 2008	Rihanna	Good Girl Gone Bad Tour	Enforcement of travel warning to Indonesia due to execution of 2002 Bali bombings convict	Rihanna became the first artist to cancel the concert at Istora since its opening in 1961.	
12 February 2009	Rihanna	Good Girl Gone Bad Tour	Chris Brown's assault on Rihanna	Rihanna became the first artist to cancel the concert at Istora since its opening in 1961.	
1 April 2016	UB40	Live in Jakarta	Unforeseen circumstances		
23 August 2019	SF9	2019 SF9 LIVE FANTASY #2 UNIXERSE	Organizer readiness issues		
28 March 2020	Khalid	Free Spirit World Tour	COVID-19 pandemic in Indonesia		
9 May 2020	Rex Orange County	The Pony Tour	COVID-19 pandemic in Indonesia	The Pony Tour was originally planned to be held at the Tennis Indoor, but later relocated to Istora due to high demand. Rex Orange County then successfully held the concert in Jakarta on 14 and 15 October 2023 at Beach City International Stadium.	
30 and 31 May 2020	One Ok Rock	Eye of The Storm Tour	COVID-19 pandemic in Indonesia	The concert was originally planned to be held only on 30 May, but the second show on 31 May was added due to high demand. One Ok Rock then successfully held the concert in Jakarta on 29 and 30 September 2023 at Beach City International Stadium, and at Indonesia Arena within the Gelora Bung Karno Sports Complex on 16 May 2026 as part of their Detox World Tour.	
27 June 2020	Lauv	How I'm Feeling Tour	COVID-19 pandemic in Indonesia	Lauv have previously canceled his 2019 Asia Tour at Tennis Indoor Senayan that was scheduled to be held on 24 May 2019 due to safety issues resulting from May 2019 riot. The concert was originally postponed to 14 September 2021, but later cancelled due to pandemic uncertainty. As a result, he became the first artist to cancel the concert at two different venues within the complex. Lauv then successfully held the concert in Jakarta on 3 September 2023 at Allianz Eco Park.	
15 August 2020	Stray Kids	District 9: Unlock World Tour	COVID-19 pandemic in Indonesia	Stray Kids then successfully held the concert in Jakarta on 12 and 13 November 2022 at Beach City International Stadium, and they returned to Gelora Bung Karno Sports Complex to held their Dominate World Tour on 21 December 2024 at Indonesia Arena.	
17 January 2023	Nightwish	Human. :II: Nature. World Tour	Concert tours restructuring		
22 November 2023	Morrissey	40 Years of Morrissey	Technical issues		
23 February 2025	Keshi	Requiem World Tour	Unforeseen circumstances	Cancellation of Khalid, Rex Orange County, Lauv, Morrissey and Keshi concert and relocation of Baekhyun concert caused no international male musicians that have successfully held the concert at Istora since Bruno Mars in April 2011. The curse was eventually broken when Maher Zain and Harris J successfully held the concert at Istora in November 2025.	
19 September 2026	T.O.P	T.O.P Pre-Studio 2026	Safety issues resulting from 2026 Anak Krakatoa eruption		

== Notable international sporting events ==
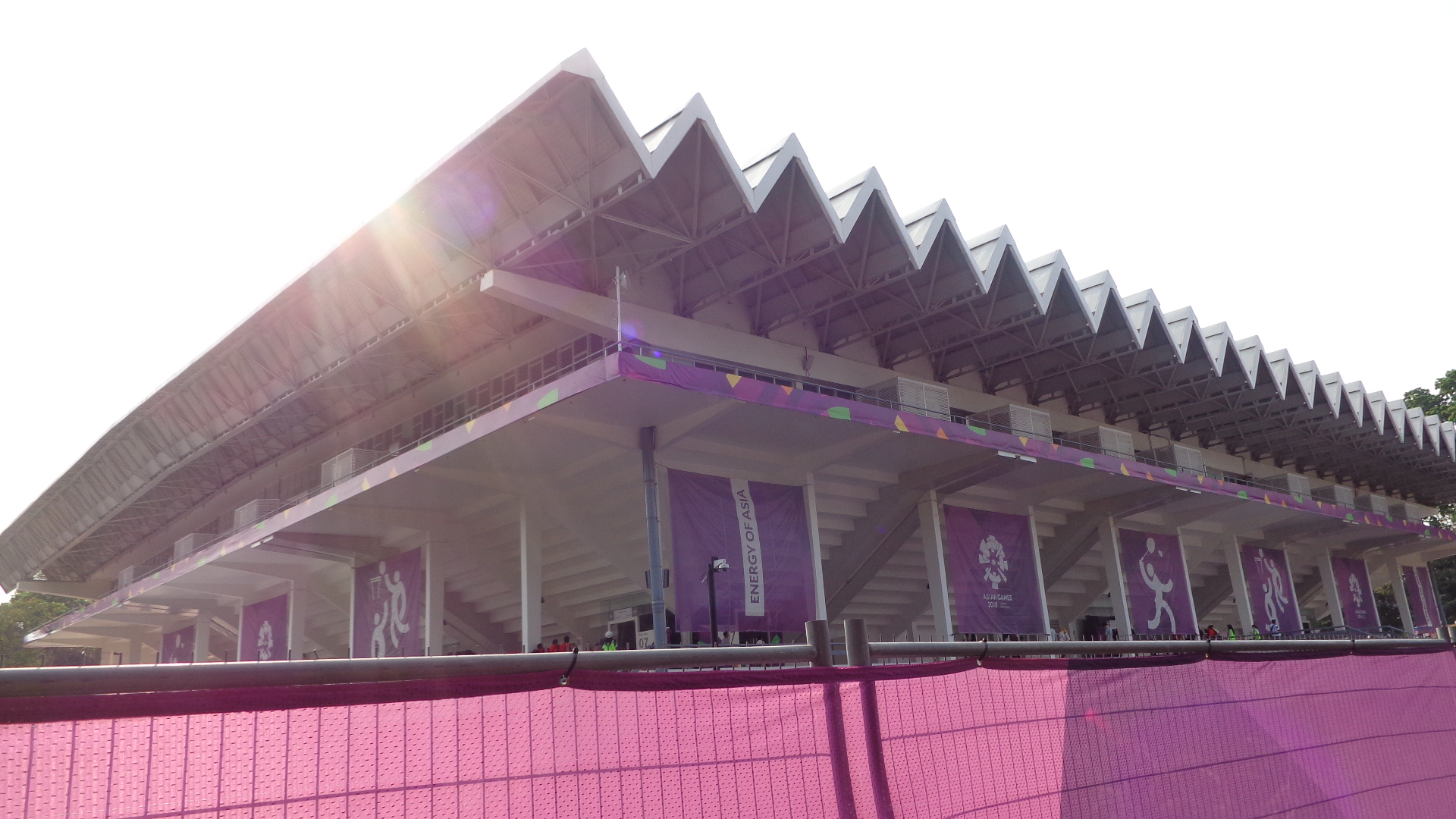
Exterior of Istora during the 2018 Asian Games

Badminton:

- Indonesia Open (since 1982)
- Indonesia Masters (Since 2018)
- Thomas Cup (1961, 1967, 1973 and 1979)
- Uber Cup (1975)
- Thomas & Uber Cup (1986, 1994, 2004 and 2008)
- Sudirman Cup (1989)
- 2015 BWF World Championships
- 1980 and 1989 IBF World Championships
- 1992 IBF World Junior Championships

Multi Events:

- 1962 and 2018 Asian Games
- 2018 Asian Para Games

Wushu:

- 2015 World Wushu Championships

Basketball:

- 2022 FIBA Asia Cup

== Gallery ==
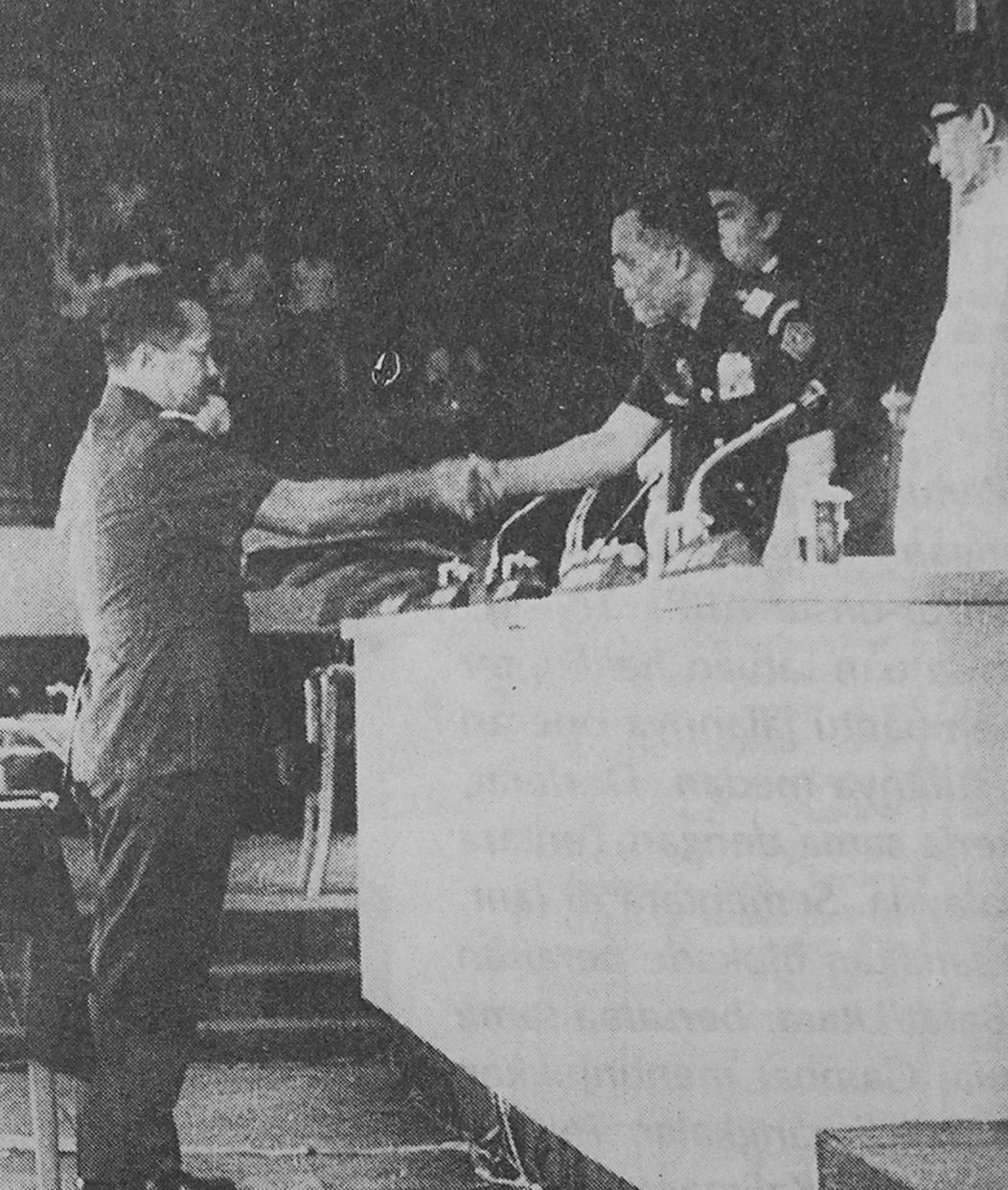
General Nasution, chair of the Provisional People's Consultative Assembly (MPRS) congratulating General Suharto on his inauguration as Acting President on 12 March 1967 at the Istora.

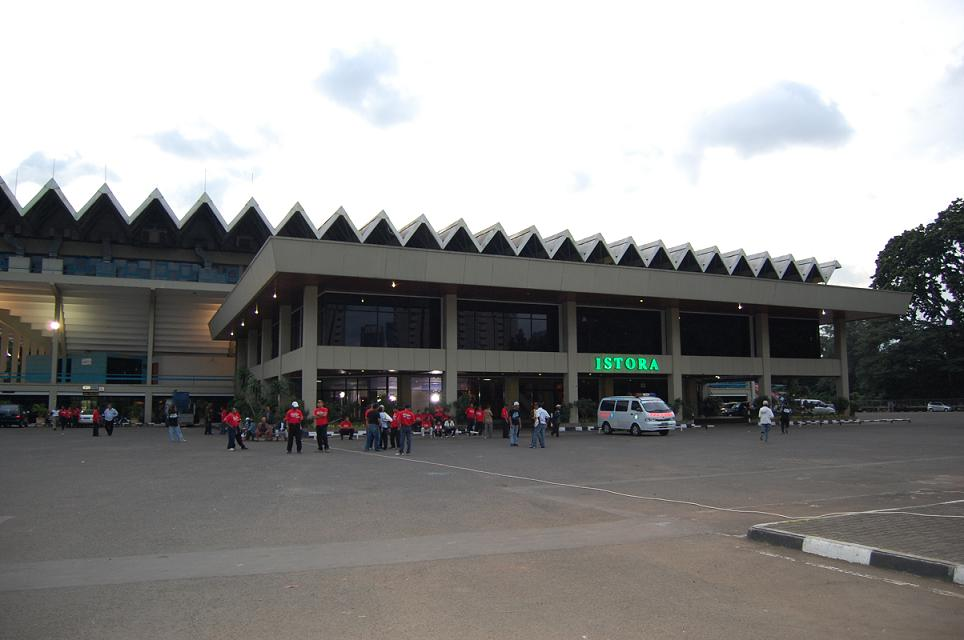
Istora in January 2008

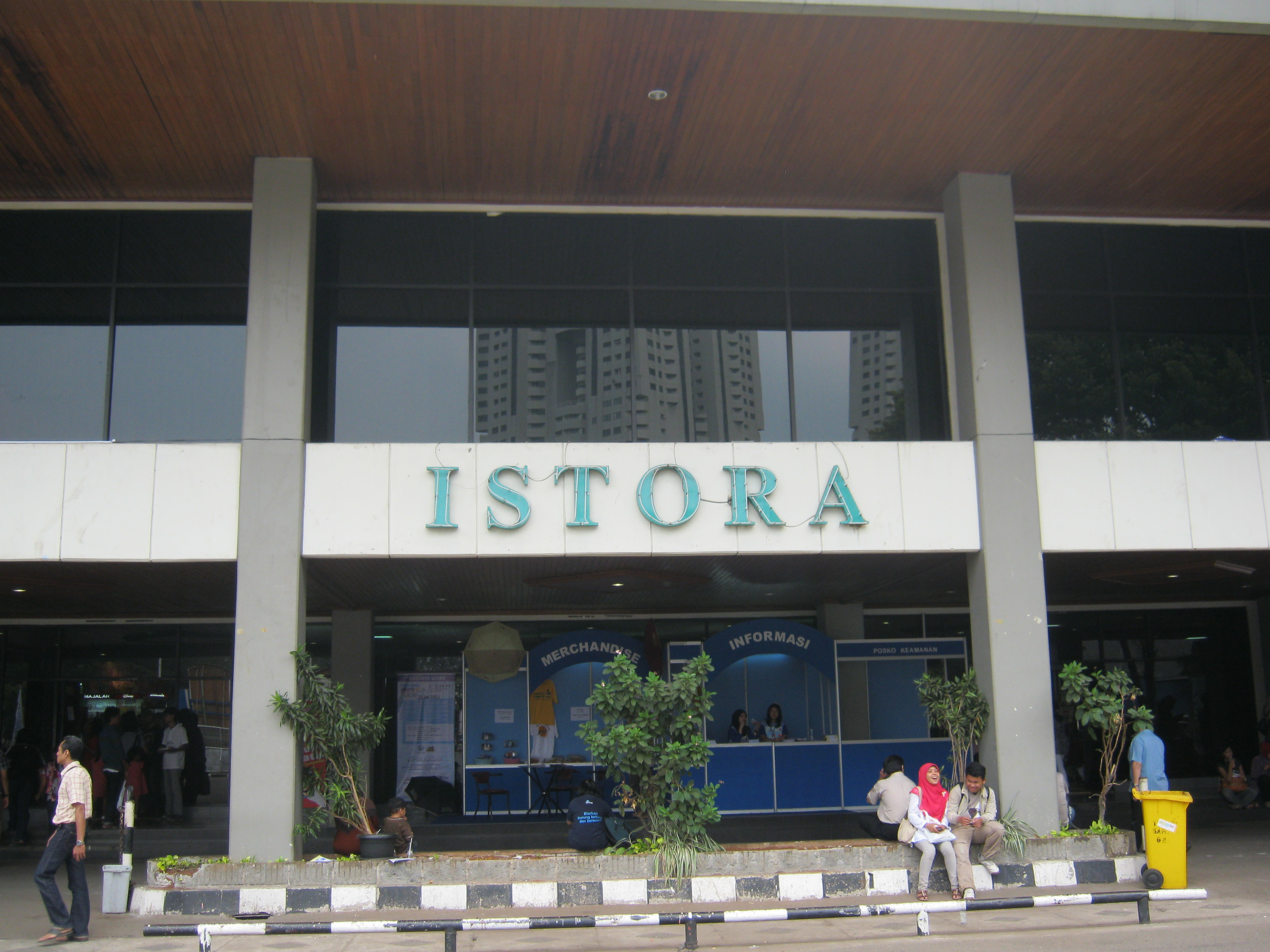
The front lobby of Istora (demolished during 2016–18 renovation)

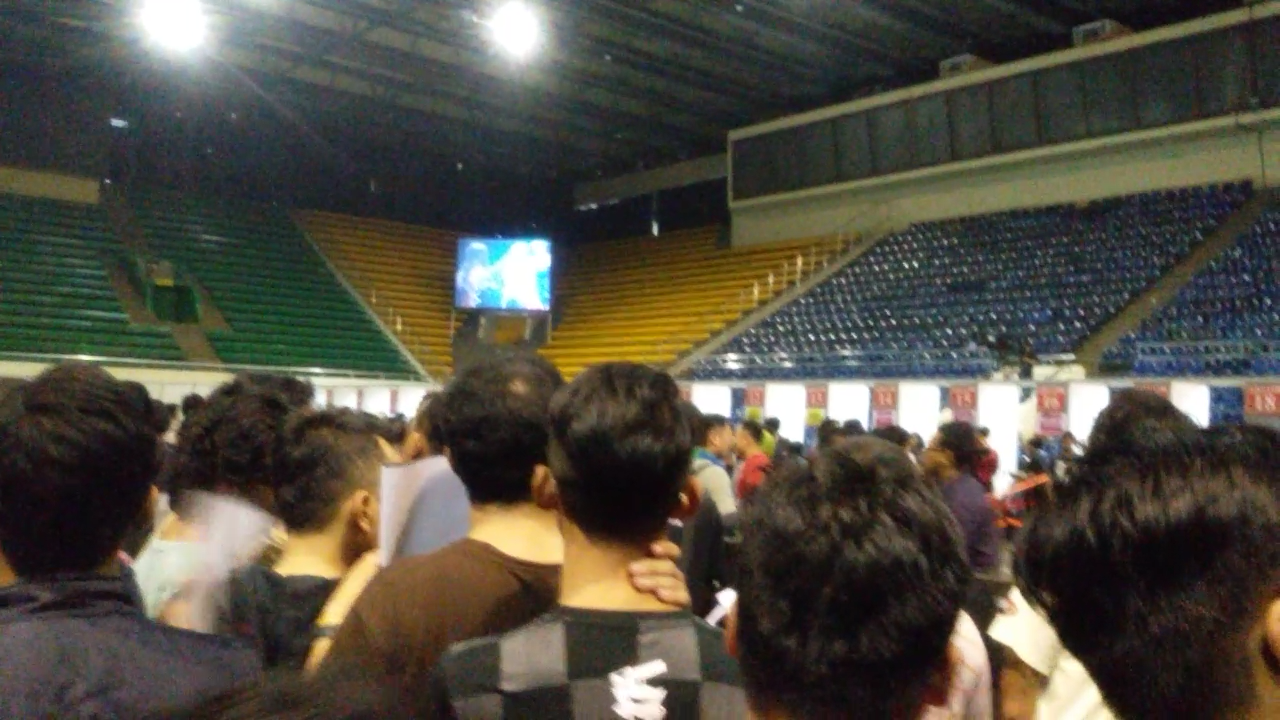
Istora in March 2016

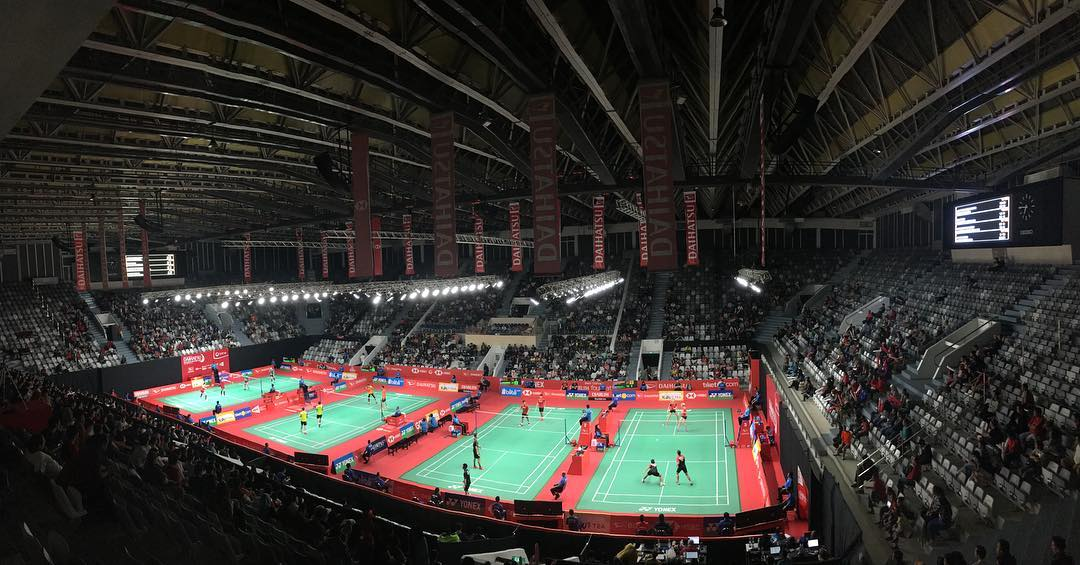
Interior of Istora during the 2018 Indonesia Masters

== See also ==
- Gelora Bung Karno Sports Complex
- Gelora Bung Karno Stadium
- Gelora Bung Karno Madya Stadium
- Indonesia Arena

Other concert venues in Greater Jakarta

- Beach City International Stadium
- Indonesia Convention Exhibition
- Jakarta International Expo
- Jakarta International Convention Center
- Jakarta International Stadium
- Sentul International Convention Center
