= Face to Face (Rex Orange County song) =

2019 single by Rex Orange County

Single by Rex Orange County

from the album Pony
- Released: 23 October 2019
- Length: 3:39
- Label: RCA Records
- Songwriter(s): Alex O'Connor
- Producer(s): Rex Orange County; Ben Baptie

Rex Orange County singles chronology
"Pluto Projector" (2019)	"Face to Face" (2019)	"Keep It Up" (2022)

"Face to Face" is a song by the English singer Rex Orange County, from his third studio album, Pony (2019). The song was released on 23 October 2019, as the third and final single from the album. The song was solely written by Rex Orange County, who produced the song with Ben Baptie.

== Background ==
"Face to Face" was first previewed by Rex Orange County at the Bowery Ballroom on 22 October 2019.

== Composition and lyrics ==
Rex Orange County stated on Twitter that "Face to Face" is about being "away from home, feeling trapped in an undesirable situation, and finding it difficult to trust people."

== Live performances ==
On his debut appearance on The Ellen DeGeneres Show, Rex Orange County performed "Face to Face" on 8 January 2020.

== Charts ==
Weekly chart performance for "Face to Face"
Chart (2019)	Peak position
New Zealand Hot Singles Chart (Recorded Music NZ)	17
UK Singles (OCC)	68
US Hot Rock & Alternative Songs (Billboard)	8
