= Untitled (Rex Orange County song) =

Single by Rex Orange County

from the album Apricot Princess
- Released: April 19, 2017
- Genre: Indie pop
- Length: 2:15
- Label: Independent
- Songwriter(s): Rex Orange County
- Producer(s): Rex Orange County

Rex Orange County singles chronology
"Sunflower" (2017)	"Untitled" (2017)	"Never Enough" (2017)

Music video
- "Untitled" on YouTube

"Untitled" is a song by English singer Rex Orange County. Released on April 19, 2017, the song is part of the album Apricot Princess.

== Background ==
Rex Orange County stated in an interview with The Fader that:

"It's a song all about the feeling you get when you do something you regret and coming to terms with your own choices,"..."I always knew I'd make a video for this song and always had this concept in mind. It's essentially just a visual representation of what's being said in the song."

== Music video ==
A music video was released on April 19, 2017. The music video was shot by Sam Hiscox.

== Personnel ==
Credits adapted from Apple Music.

Musicians

- Rex Orange County – Vocals, Electric Guitar

Technical

- Rex Orange County – Songwriter, Producer
- Two Inch Punch – Recording Engineer
- Ben Baptie – Mixing Engineer
- John Davis – Mastering Engineer
