= Loving Is Easy =

2017 single by Rex Orange County

Single by Rex Orange County featuring Benny Sings
- Released: 11 October 2017
- Genre: Indie pop; disco
- Length: 2:35
- Label: Self-released
- Songwriters: Alexander O'Connor; Tim Berkestijn
- Producer: Rex Orange County

Rex Orange County featuring Benny Sings singles chronology
"Edition" (2017)	"Loving Is Easy" (2017)	"New House" (2019)

"Loving Is Easy" is a song by the English singer Rex Orange County featuring the Dutch musician Benny Sings. It was self-released on 11 October 2017, and written and produced by Rex Orange County, with Benny Sings receiving writing credits.

== Critical reception ==
Complex ranked "Loving is Easy" as the seventeenth best song of 2017, with Alex Gardener writing that the song is the type to have people "learn on guitar to impress their crushes," and could be played at weddings, calling it a "classic sounding record."

== Music video ==
The music video for "Loving Is Easy" was released alongside the song. It features a stop-motion animated version of the two artists, made by Chris Ullens.

== Charts ==
Weekly chart performance for "Loving Is Easy"
Chart (2017)	Peak position
US Rock & Alternative Airplay (Billboard)	35

== Certifications ==
Certifications for "Loving Is Easy"
Region	Certification	Certified units/sales
Australia (ARIA)	2× Platinum	140,000^{‡}
New Zealand (RMNZ)	Platinum	30,000^{‡}
United Kingdom (BPI)	Platinum	600,000^{‡}
United States (RIAA)	2× Platinum	2,000,000^{‡}
^{‡} Sales+streaming figures based on certification alone.
