= List of Lauv live performances =

The following is the list of the live performances of American singer-songwriter Lauv.

== Live performances ==
=== Headlining ===
==== Late Nights, Deep Talks Tour (2017) ====
| Date | City | Country | Venue |
Leg 1 – North America
| May 23, 2017 | Los Angeles | United States | The Echo |
| May 24, 2017 | San Francisco | United States | Rickshaw Shop |
| May 31, 2017 | Chicago | United States | Beat Kitchen |
| June 1, 2017 | Pontiac | United States | Pike Room |
| June 2, 2017 | Toronto | Canada | The Drake |
| June 4, 2017 | Philadelphia | United States | Balcony at the Trocadero |
| June 6, 2017 | Washington, D.C. | United States | Songbyrd |
| June 7, 2017 | New York | United States | Webster Hall |

==== I Met You When I Was 18. World tour (2018) ====
List of concerts, showing date, city, country, venue, opening acts
| Date | City | Country | Venue | Opening acts |
North America
| January 18, 2018 | Seattle | United States | The Crocodile | Jeremy Zucker |
| January 19, 2018 | Vancouver | Canada | Fortune | Jeremy Zucker |
| January 20, 2018 | Portland | United States | Hawthorne Theatre | Jeremy Zucker |
| January 23, 2018 | San Francisco | United States | Independent | Ashe |
| January 26, 2018 | Los Angeles | United States | Troubadour | Ashe |
| January 28, 2018 | Phoenix | United States | Crescent Ballroom | Ashe |
| January 30, 2018 | Austin | United States | Parish | Ashe |
| January 31, 2018 | Dallas | United States | House of Blues (Cambridge Room) | Ashe |
| February 1, 2018 | Houston | United States | House of Blues (Bronze Peacock) | Ashe |
| February 3, 2018 | Atlanta | United States | Terminal West | Ashe |
| February 6, 2018 | Washington | United States | 9:30 Club | Ashe |
| February 8, 2018 | New York City | United States | Irving Plaza | Ashe |
| February 9, 2018 | Boston | United States | Brighton Music Hall | Ashe |
| February 10, 2018 | Philadelphia | United States | The Foundry | Ashe |
| February 12, 2018 | Burlington | United States | Higher Ground | Ashe |
| February 14, 2018 | Toronto | Canada | Mod Club | Jeremy Zucker |
| February 16, 2018 | Chicago | United States | Lincoln Hall | Jeremy Zucker |
| February 17, 2018 | Minneapolis | United States | 7th Street Entry | Jeremy Zucker |
| February 18, 2018 | Omaha | United States | The Slowdown Jr | Jeremy Zucker |
| February 20, 2018 | Denver | United States | Bluebird Theatre | Jeremy Zucker |
| February 21, 2018 | Salt Lake City | United States | The Complex | — |
Asia
| March 6, 2018 | Tokyo | Japan | Unit | — |
| March 7, 2018 | Tokyo | Japan | Unit | |
Oceania
| March 13, 2018 | Brisbane | Australia | The Triffid | — |
| March 15, 2018 | Sydney | Australia | The Metro Theatre | — |
| March 16, 2018 | Melbourne | Australia | The Corner Hotel | — |
| March 19, 2018 | Auckland | New Zealand | Powerstation | — |
Europe
| April 16, 2018 | Manchester | England | Deaf Institute | — |
| April 17, 2018 | London | England | O2 Islington Academy | — |
| April 19, 2018 | Paris | France | La Maroquinerie | — |
| April 20, 2018 | Amsterdam | Netherlands | Melkweg | — |
| April 21, 2018 | Leuven | Belgium | Het Depot (Box) | — |
| April 23, 2018 | Cologne | Germany | Bürgerhaus Stollwerck | — |
| April 24, 2018 | Berlin | Germany | Columbia Theater | — |
| April 26, 2018 | Copenhagen | Denmark | Pumpehuset | — |
| April 27, 2018 | Stockholm | Sweden | Kagelbanan | — |
| April 29, 2018 | Oslo | Norway | Parkteateret | — |

==== Fall tour (2018) ====
| Date | City | Country | Venue |
Leg 1- Europe
| September 15, 2018 | Munich | Germany | Gruenspan |
| September 16, 2018 | Frankfurt | Germany | Batschkapp |
| September 18, 2018 | London | United Kingdom | KOKO |
| September 19, 2018 | Paris | France | Le Yoyo |
Leg 2- North America
| October 7, 2018 | Louisville | United States | Mercury Ballroom |
| October 9, 2018 | Cincinnati | United States | Bogart's |
| October 10, 2018 | Grand Rapids | United States | The Intersection |
| October 12, 2018 | Indianapolis | United States | Egyptian Room |
| October 14, 2018 | Columbia | United States | Blue Note |
| October 16, 2018 | Omaha | United States | Sokol Auditorium |
| October 21, 2018 | Des Moines | United States | Wooly's |
| October 24, 2018 | Urbana | United States | Canopy Club |
| October 28, 2018 | Tulsa | United States | Cain's Ballroom |
| October 30, 2018 | Mobile | United States | Soul Kitchen |
| November 1, 2018 | Birmingham | United States | Iron City |
| November 5, 2018 | Columbia | United States | Music Farm |
| November 8, 2018 | Orlando | United States | House of Blues |

==== Asia tour (2019) ====
| Date | City | Country | Venue |
Leg 1- Asia
| May 13, 2019 | Mumbai | India | Famous Studios |
| May 15, 2019 | Singapore | | Capitol Theatre |
| May 16, 2019 | Singapore | | Capitol Theatre |
| May 18, 2019 | Bangkok | Thailand | Moonstar Studio |
| May 20, 2019 | Manila | Philippines | Araneta Coliseum |
| May 21, 2019 | Cebu | Philippines | Waterfront Cebu City Hotel & Casino |
| May 23, 2019 | Hong Kong | China | The Vine |
| May 26, 2019 | Seoul | South Korea | Olympic Park |
| May 28, 2019 | Osaka | Japan | Big Cat |
| May 29, 2019 | Nagoya | Japan | Club Quattro |
| May 30, 2019 | Tokyo | Japan | Blitz |

==== How I'm Feeling Tour (2019) ====
| Date | City | Country | Venue | Opening act |
Leg 1 – North America
| October 5, 2019 | Washington, D.C. | United States | The Anthem | Bülow |
| October 6, 2019 | Philadelphia | United States | Fillmore | Bülow |
| October 7, 2019 | Boston | United States | House of Blues | Bülow |
| October 10, 2019 | New York City | United States | Terminal 5 | Bülow |
| October 11, 2019 | New York City | United States | Terminal 5 | Bülow |
| October 13, 2019 | Chicago | United States | Riviera Theatre | Bülow |
| October 16, 2019 | Oakland | United States | Fox Theatre | Bülow |
| October 19, 2019 | Los Angeles | United States | Pellissier Building and Wiltern Theatre | Bülow |
| October 20, 2019 | Los Angeles | United States | Pellissier Building and Wiltern Theatre | Bülow |
Leg 2- Europe
| October 25, 2019 | Berlin | Germany | Tempodrom | Chelsea Cutler |
| October 26, 2019 | Cologne | Germany | Palladium | Chelsea Cutler |
| October 28, 2019 | Hamburg | Germany | Docks | Chelsea Cutler |
| October 30, 2019 | Brussels | Belgium | Ancienne Belgique | Chelsea Cutler |
| October 31, 2019 | Amsterdam | Netherlands | Paradiso | Chelsea Cutler |
| November 2, 2019 | Paris | France | Le Trianon | Chelsea Cutler |
| November 4, 2019 | London | England | O2 Forum Kentish Town | Chelsea Cutler |
Leg 3- Oceania
| November 20, 2019 | Auckland | New Zealand | Shed 10x | Carlie Hanson |
| November 22, 2019 | Brisbane | Australia | The Tivoli | Carlie Hanson |
| November 23, 2019 | Sydney | Australia | Enmore Theatre | Carlie Hanson |
| November 24, 2019 | Melbourne | Australia | Forum Theatre | Carlie Hanson |
| November 26, 2019 | Perth | Australia | Astor Theatre | Carlie Hanson |

==== Cancelled dates due to COVID-19 ====
| Date | City | Country | Venue | Status | Reason |
|---|---|---|---|---|---|
| March 20, 2020 | Monterrey | Mexico | Parque Fundidora | Cancelled | COVID-19 pandemic |
| March 23, 2020 | Mexico City | Mexico | El Plaza Condeza | Cancelled | COVID-19 pandemic |
| March 25, 2020 | Lima | Peru | Domos Art | Cancelled | COVID-19 pandemic |
| March 27, 2020 | Santiago | Chile | Parque O'Higgins | Cancelled | COVID-19 pandemic |
| March 29, 2020 | Buenos Aires | Argentina | Hipódromo de San Isidro | Cancelled | COVID-19 pandemic |
| March 30, 2020 | Buenos Aires | Argentina | Teatro Vórterix | Cancelled | COVID-19 pandemic |
| April 1, 2020 | São Paulo | Brazil | Cine Joia | Cancelled | COVID-19 pandemic |
| April 3, 2020 | São Paulo | Brazil | Autódromo de Interlagos | Cancelled | COVID-19 pandemic |
| May 11, 2020 | Lisbon | Portugal | Lisbon Coliseum | Cancelled | COVID-19 pandemic |
| May 13, 2020 | Madrid | Spain | Sala La Riviera | Cancelled | COVID-19 pandemic |
| May 14, 2020 | Barcelona | Spain | Razzmatazz | Cancelled | COVID-19 pandemic |
| May 16, 2020 | Milan | Italy | Fabrique | Cancelled | COVID-19 pandemic |
| May 18, 2020 | Lyon | France | Le Transbordeur | Cancelled | COVID-19 pandemic |
| May 19, 2020 | Zurich | Switzerland | X-TRA | Cancelled | COVID-19 pandemic |
| May 20, 2020 | Vienna | Austria | Gasometer | Cancelled | COVID-19 pandemic |
| May 22, 2020 | Prague | Czech Republic | Malá sportovní hala | Cancelled | COVID-19 pandemic |
| May 23, 2020 | Warsaw | Poland | Club Progresja | Cancelled | COVID-19 pandemic |
| May 24, 2020 | Riga | Latvia | Palladium Riga | Cancelled | COVID-19 pandemic |
| May 26, 2020 | Stockholm | Sweden | Arenan Fryshuset | Cancelled | COVID-19 pandemic |
| May 28, 2020 | Oslo | Norway | Sentrum Scene | Cancelled | COVID-19 pandemic |
| May 30, 2020 | Copenhagen | Denmark | Vega | Cancelled | COVID-19 pandemic |
| June 16, 2020 | Bangalore | India | Manpho Convention Center | Cancelled | COVID-19 pandemic |
| June 18, 2020 | Mumbai | India | Sardar Vallabhbhai Patel Indoor Stadium | Cancelled | COVID-19 pandemic |
| June 21, 2020 | Beijing | China | Exhibition Theatre | Cancelled | COVID-19 pandemic |
| June 22, 2020 | Shanghai | China | Modern Sky Lab | Cancelled | COVID-19 pandemic |
| June 23, 2020 | Shanghai | China | Modern Sky Lab | Cancelled | COVID-19 pandemic |
| June 25, 2020 | Taipei | Taiwan | Legacy Max | Cancelled | COVID-19 pandemic |
| June 27, 2020 | Jakarta | Indonesia | Istora Gelora Bung Karno | Cancelled | COVID-19 pandemic |
| July 17, 2020 | Charlotte | United States | Metro Credit Union Amphitheatre | Cancelled | COVID-19 pandemic |
| July 18, 2020 | Nashville | United States | Ascend Amphitheater | Cancelled | COVID-19 pandemic |
| July 19, 2020 | Atlanta | United States | Coca-Cola Roxy | Cancelled | COVID-19 pandemic |
| July 21, 2020 | Detroit | United States | Meadow Brook Theatre | Cancelled | COVID-19 pandemic |
| July 22, 2020 | Toronto | Canada | Echo Beach | Cancelled | COVID-19 pandemic |
| July 24, 2020 | Indianápolis | United States | White River State Park | Cancelled | COVID-19 pandemic |
| July 25, 2020 | Cincinnati | United States | PNC Pavilion | Cancelled | COVID-19 pandemic |
| July 26, 2020 | Cleveland | United States | Jacobs Pavilion at Nautica | Cancelled | COVID-19 pandemic |
| July 28, 2020 | Minneapolis | United States | The Armory | Cancelled | COVID-19 pandemic |
| July 29, 2020 | Council Bluffs | United States | Stir Cove | Cancelled | COVID-19 pandemic |
| July 30, 2020 | St. Louis | United States | Saint Louis Music Park | Cancelled | COVID-19 pandemic |
| August 2, 2020 | Montreal | Canada | Parque Jean-Drapeau | Cancelled | COVID-19 pandemic |
| August 4, 2020 | Philadelphia | United States | The Met Philadelphia | Cancelled | COVID-19 pandemic |
| August 6, 2020 | New York City | United States | Radio City Music Hall | Cancelled | COVID-19 pandemic |
| August 7, 2020 | Boston | United States | Rockland Trust Bank Pavilion | Cancelled | COVID-19 pandemic |
| August 8, 2020 | Baltimore | United States | MECU Pavilion | Cancelled | COVID-19 pandemic |
| August 9, 2020 | Raleigh | United States | Red Hat Amphitheater | Cancelled | COVID-19 pandemic |
| August 11, 2020 | Miami | United States | Bayfront Park | Cancelled | COVID-19 pandemic |
| August 12, 2020 | St. Augustine | United States | St. Augustine Amphitheatre | Cancelled | COVID-19 pandemic |
| August 14, 2020 | Houston | United States | Revention Music Center | Cancelled | COVID-19 pandemic |
| August 15, 2020 | Irving | United States | LiveNation Pavilion | Cancelled | COVID-19 pandemic |
| August 16, 2020 | Kansas City | United States | Starlight Theatre | Cancelled | COVID-19 pandemic |
| August 18, 2020 | Morrison | United States | Red Rocks Park | Cancelled | COVID-19 pandemic |
| August 19, 2020 | Salt Lake City | United States | The Complex | Cancelled | COVID-19 pandemic |
| August 21, 2020 | Phoenix | United States | Arizona Federal Theatre | Cancelled | COVID-19 pandemic |
| August 22, 2020 | Las Vegas | United States | The Chelsea | Cancelled | COVID-19 pandemic |
| August 24, 2020 | Vancouver | Canada | Queen Elizabeth Theatre | Cancelled | COVID-19 pandemic |
| August 25, 2020 | Troutdale | United States | McMenamins Edgefield | Cancelled | COVID-19 pandemic |
| August 26, 2020 | Seattle | United States | WaMu Theater | Cancelled | COVID-19 pandemic |
| August 28, 2020 | Berkeley | United States | Hearst Greek Theatre | Cancelled | COVID-19 pandemic |
| August 29, 2020 | Los Ángeles | United States | The Greek Theatre | Cancelled | COVID-19 pandemic |
| August 30, 2020 | Los Ángeles | United States | The Greek Theatre | Cancelled | COVID-19 pandemic |
| September 16, 2020 | Auckland | New Zealand | Spark Arena | Cancelled | COVID-19 pandemic |
| September 18, 2020 | Melbourne | Australia | Margaret Court Arena | Cancelled | COVID-19 pandemic |
| September 21, 2020 | Sydney | Australia | Hordern Pavilion | Cancelled | COVID-19 pandemic |
| September 24, 2020 | Brisbane | Australia | Fortitude Music Hall | Cancelled | COVID-19 pandemic |
| October 26, 2020 | Oberhausen | Germany | König-Pilsener-ARENA | Cancelled | COVID-19 pandemic |
| October 28, 2020 | Munich | Germany | Zenith | Cancelled | COVID-19 pandemic |
| October 29, 2020 | Stuttgart | Germany | Porsche-Arena | Cancelled | COVID-19 pandemic |
| October 31, 2020 | Hannover | Germany | Swiss Life Hall | Cancelled | COVID-19 pandemic |
| November 2, 2020 | Frankfurt | Germany | Jahrhunderthalle | Cancelled | COVID-19 pandemic |
| November 3, 2020 | Antwerp | Belgium | Lotto Arena | Cancelled | COVID-19 pandemic |
| November 5, 2020 | Paris | France | Zénith | Cancelled | COVID-19 pandemic |
| November 6, 2020 | Amsterdam | Netherlands | AFAS Live | Cancelled | COVID-19 pandemic |
| November 7, 2020 | Tilburg | Netherlands | 013 Poppodium | Cancelled | COVID-19 pandemic |
| November 10, 2020 | Birmingham | United Kingdom | O2 Academy Birmingham | Cancelled | COVID-19 pandemic |
| November 11, 2020 | Glasgow | United Kingdom | O2 Academy Glasgow | Cancelled | COVID-19 pandemic |
| November 13, 2020 | Manchester | United Kingdom | Manchester Academy | Cancelled | COVID-19 pandemic |
| November 17, 2020 | London | United Kingdom | O2 Academy Brixton | Cancelled | COVID-19 pandemic |

==== The All 4 Nothing Tour (2022–2023) ====
| Date | City | Country | Venue |
Leg 1 – North America
| August 11, 2022 | Minneapolis | United States | Armory |
| August 12, 2022 | Chicago | United States | Aragon Ballroom |
| August 13, 2022 | Rochester Hills | United States | Meadow Brook Amphitheatre |
| August 15, 2022 | Toronto | Canada | RBC Echo Beach |
| August 16, 2022 | Laval | Canada | Place Bell |
| August 17, 2022 | Boston | United States | Leader Bank Pavilion |
| August 19, 2022 | Philadelphia | United States | Metropolitan Opera House |
| August 20, 2022 | Pittsburgh | United States | Stage AE |
| August 21, 2022 | Cincinnati | United States | ICON Festival Stage |
| August 23, 2022 | Columbus | United States | KEMBA Live! |
| August 25, 2022 | Washington, D.C. | United States | The Anthem |
| August 26, 2022 | New York City | United States | Hammerstein Ballroom |
| August 27, 2022 | New York City | United States | Hammerstein Ballroom |
| August 28, 2022 | Asbury Park | United States | Stone Pony |
| August 30, 2022 | Charlotte | United States | Charlotte Metro Credit Union Amphitheatre |
| August 31, 2022 | Atlanta | United States | Coca-Cola Roxy Theatre |
| September 1, 2022 | Nashville | United States | Ryman Auditorium |
| September 3, 2022 | Houston | United States | 713 Music Hall |
| September 4, 2022 | Irving | United States | Toyota Music Factory |
| September 6, 2022 | Denver | United States | Mission Ballroom |
| September 7, 2022 | Ogden | United States | Ogden Amphitheatre |
| September 9, 2022 | Los Angeles | United States | Greek Theatre |
| September 11, 2022 | San Diego | United States | Cal Coast Credit Union Open Air Theatre at SDSU |
| September 12, 2022 | Phoenix | United States | Arizona Federal Theatre |
| September 15, 2022 | Berkeley | United States | Hearst Greek Theatre |
| September 17, 2022 | Vancouver | Canada | Doug Mitchell Thunderbird Sports Centre |
| September 20, 2022 | Seattle | United States | WaMu Theater |
Leg 2 – Asia
| August 19, 2023 | Osaka | Japan | Maishima |
| August 20, 2023 | Chiba | Japan | Makuhari Messe |
| August 22, 2023 | Hong Kong | China | AsiaWorld–Expo |
| August 23, 2023 | Hong Kong | China | AsiaWorld–Expo |
| August 26, 2023 | Bangkok | Thailand | Queen Sirikit National Convention Center |
| August 29, 2023 | Seoul | South Korea | Olympic Gymnastics Arena |
| August 31, 2023 | Taipei | Taiwan | Taipei Nangang Exhibition Center |
| September 3, 2023 | Jakarta | Indonesia | Eco Park Ancol |
| September 5, 2023 | Singapore | | Singapore Indoor Stadium |
| September 7, 2023 | Kaohsiung | Taiwan | Kaohsiung Arena |
| September 9, 2023 | Cebu | Philippines | Waterfront Cebu City Hotel & Casino |
| September 11, 2023 | Manila | Philippines | SM Mall of Asia Arena |
| September 14, 2023 | Chengdu | China | EUMC |
| September 15, 2023 | Chengdu | China | EUMC |
| September 17, 2023 | Foshan | China | GBA International Sports and Cultural Center |
| September 20, 2023 | Shanghai | China | Shanghai Oriental Sports Center |
Leg 3 – Europe & UK*
| October 3, 2023 | Amsterdam | Netherlands | AFAS Live |
| October 4, 2023 | Hamburg | Germany | Docks |
| October 6, 2023 | Berlin | Germany | Tempodrom |
| October 7, 2023 | Cologne | Germany | E-Werk |
| October 9, 2023 | Brussels | Belgium | La Madeleine |
| October 10, 2023 | Paris | France | Salle Pleyel |
| October 12, 2023 | London | England | Eventim Apollo |
Leg 4 – Australia
| October 18, 2023 | Perth | Australia | Astor Theatre |
| October 19, 2023 | Perth | Australia | Astor Theatre |
| October 21, 2023 | Sydney | Australia | Enmore Theatre |
| October 22, 2023 | Sydney | Australia | Enmore Theatre |
| October 23, 2023 | Melbourne | Australia | Forum Melbourne |
| October 24, 2023 | Melbourne | Australia | Forum Melbourne |
| October 26, 2023 | Brisbane | Australia | The Fortitude Music Hall |

- Canadian singer Renforshort opened for Leg 3 of the tour

=== Supporting ===
- Last to Leave Tour (2017)
- ÷ Tour (2017–2018)
- It's Always Summer Somewhere Tour (2026)
