= Never Enough (Rex Orange County song) =

Single by Rex Orange County

from the album Apricot Princess
- Language: English
- Released: April 26, 2017
- Genre: Garage pop; Indie rock; alternative rock
- Length: 4:58
- Label: Independent
- Songwriter: Rex Orange County
- Producers: Rex Orange County; Two Inch Punch

Rex Orange County singles chronology
| "Untitled" (2017) | "Never Enough" (2017) | "Edition" (2017) |

Licensed audio
- "Never Enough" on YouTube

"Never Enough" is a song by English singer Rex Orange County. Released on April 26, 2017, the song is featured in the soundtrack for the 2017 video game FIFA 18.

== Personnel ==
Credits are adapted from Apple Music.

Musicians

- Rex Orange County – vocals, drums, bass, programming, keyboards, electric guitar, acoustic guitar
- Joe MacLaren – bass

Technical

- Rex Orange County – producer, songwriter
- Two Inch Punch – producer, recording engineer
- Ben Baptie – mixing engineer
- John Davis – mastering engineer

== Commercial performance ==
The song was listed as one of NME's top ten songs on the FIFA 18 soundtrack.
