= Who Cares? (album) =

Studio album by Rex Orange County
- Released: 11 March 2022
- Recorded: October 2020
- Genre: Bedroom pop
- Length: 34:51
- Label: RCA
- Producers: Rex Orange County; Benny Sings

Rex Orange County chronology
Pony (2019)	Who Cares? (2022)	The Alexander Technique (2024)

Singles from Who Cares?
- 1. "Keep It Up" Released: 26 January 2022; 2. "Amazing" Released: 14 February 2022; 3. "Open a Window" Released: 9 March 2022

Who Cares? is the fourth studio album by the English musician Rex Orange County, released on 11 March 2022, through RCA Records. The album was written and produced by Rex Orange County and the Dutch musician Benny Sings, with an appearance from the American rapper Tyler, the Creator.

The album debuted at number 5 on the US Billboard 200 chart with 35,000 album equivalent units.

== Background ==
Following the release of his third studio album, Pony (2019), Rex Orange County began work on his fourth studio album sometime in the fall of 2020. Rex Orange County and the Dutch musician Benny Sings met in what was described as a "session without expectations," which later turned into a "productive 48-hour window of recording". The two later went on a trip to Amsterdam where the album was finished in a span of 10 days. On 13 October 2020, he posted an image of him and Benny Sings in the studio on Twitter, and revealed more information four days later, stating he had finished the album, and revealed its title. On 31 December 2020, he confirmed that the album was set for release in 2021.

After a long period of silence on social media throughout 2021, Rex Orange County replied to a tweet on 1 January 2022, apologizing for the delay of the album, and asked if his fans still wanted to hear it. He then posted a video to TikTok, on 15 January 2022, teasing a snippet of a track which was reportedly titled "Keep It Up". The song's title was officially confirmed on 26 January 2022, when it was released, along with the official announcement of the release date, artwork, and track listing of Who Cares?, revealing a feature from the American rapper Tyler, the Creator, who Rex Orange County first worked with for Tyler's studio album, Flower Boy (2017).

== Composition ==
Musically, Who Cares? is described as a bedroom pop record, with elements of soul, jazz, and dance.

Rex Orange County explained that the album's title was in his head before recording sessions began, and that he decided it needed to be the title after some of the songs were recorded.

== Promotion ==
=== Singles ===
After teasing the song on TikTok, Rex Orange County released "Keep It Up" as the album's lead single, on 26 January 2022, with its music video premiering the same day.

"Amazing" was released as the album's second single on 14 February 2022, alongside its music video.

Two days before the album's release, "Open a Window" featuring Tyler, the Creator was released as the album's third and final single, on 11 March 2022.

=== Other songs ===
The music video for the album's ninth track, "Making Time", was released on 15 March 2022. The music video for the album's fifth track, "One in a Million", was released on 7 June 2022.

=== Performances ===
During a TikTok livestream on 3 February 2022, Rex Orange County performed "Keep It Up" alongside two unreleased tracks from Who Cares?, "Amazing" and "Making Time". He appeared on The Late Show With Stephen Colbert on 12 March 2022, performing "One in a Million".

== Critical reception ==
Professional ratings
Aggregate scores
Source	Rating
Metacritic	70/100
Review scores
Source	Rating
AllMusic	4/5 stars
DIY	3.5/5 stars
The Guardian	3/5 stars
The Independent	3/5 stars
NME	4/5 stars

Who Cares? received favorable reviews from critics. At Metacritic, which assigns a normalized rating out of 100 to reviews from mainstream publications, the album received an average score of 70, based on 8 reviews, indicating "generally favorable" reviews.

In a more critical review of the album, Alexis Petridis of The Guardian rated Who Cares? two out of five stars, writing that the singer was playing it "gratingly safe". Writing for The Observer, Ammar Kalia described it as "sweet, unremarkable bedroom pop", which "offers plenty of hooks but lacks the depth to be truly memorable."

== Track listing ==
All tracks written and produced by Alex "Rex Orange County" O'Connor and Benny Sings, except where noted.

Who Cares? track listing
No.	Title	Writer(s)	Length
1.	"Keep It Up"		3:03
2.	"Open a Window" (featuring Tyler, the Creator)	O'Connor; Benny Sings; Tyler Okonma	3:39
3.	"Worth It"		2:45
4.	"Amazing"		3:29
5.	"One in a Million"		3:15
6.	"If You Want It"		3:07
7.	"7am"		3:19
8.	"The Shade"		3:02
9.	"Making Time"		1:55
10.	"Shoot Me Down"		4:52
11.	"Who Cares?"		2:29
Total length:			34:51

Japanese edition bonus track
No.	Title	Length
12.	"Making Time" (Alternative Version)	2:06
Total length:		37:04

== Personnel ==
Musicians

- Rex Orange County – vocals, arrangement (all tracks); keyboards (1), piano (1, 2, 10, 11), percussion (2, 9), synthesizer (6, 9), glockenspiel (8); acoustic guitar, drums (9)
- Benny Sings – arrangement (all tracks), background vocals (1, 5, 11), keyboards (1, 3, 4, 8, 11), programming (1, 2, 4–7, 9–11), bass (3–5, 7, 8), drum machine (3, 8–10), electric guitar (3, 4, 8), orchestra (3), piano (5, 7, 11)
- Joe MacLaren – bass (1, 2, 9–11)
- Tyler, the Creator – vocals (2)

Technical

- Joe LaPorta – mastering
- Ben Baptie – mixing (all tracks), engineering (5)
- Benny Sings – engineering
- Vic Wainstein – engineering (2)
- Tom Archer – mixing assistance

Artwork

- Bráulio Amado – illustrations
- Aidan Zamiri – photography

== Charts ==
Chart performance for Who Cares?
Chart (2022)	Peak position
Australian Albums (ARIA)	2
Belgian Albums (Ultratop Flanders)	95
Belgian Albums (Ultratop Wallonia)	193
Canadian Albums (Billboard)	16
Dutch Albums (Album Top 100)	77
Irish Albums (Official Charts)	2
Lithuanian Albums (AGATA)	78
New Zealand Albums (RMNZ)	1
Portuguese Albums (AFP)	14
Scottish Albums (Official Charts)	1
Spanish Albums (Promusicae)	76
UK Albums (Official Charts)	1
US Billboard 200	5
US Top Alternative Albums (Billboard)	1
US Top Rock Albums (Billboard)	2
