= Cosmo Pyke =

British singer-songwriter, musician

- Origin: London, England
- Instruments: Guitar, vocals
- Years active: 2016–present
- Labels: 70Hz Recordings; Pykrete Records
- Website: cosmopyke.com

Cosmo Pyke is an English singer-songwriter, multi-instrumentalist and artist from London. His debut EP Just Cosmo was co-produced with Fraser T. Smith, in association with 70Hz Recordings. His later releases are via his own label, Pykrete Records.

== Biography ==
Cosmo was born in Peckham, Southeast London. He attended The Brit School for Performing Arts, following famous singer-songwriter alumni Adele, Amy Winehouse, Jamie Woon, Loyle Carner, and more.

== Music career ==
His 2017 debut EP Just Cosmo was released in collaboration with producer Fraser T. Smith’s 70Hz Recordings. Tracks on the EP are ‘Wish You Were Gone’, ‘Chronic Sunshine’, ‘After School Club’, ‘Social Sites’ and ‘Great Dane’.

In 2017, The Guardian described his sound as, ‘a fusion of jazz, 2-tone, Tyler, the Creator and the Kooks.’ Dazed said: ‘Pyke’s songs combine “classical songwriting with a dash of reggae, hip hop, and indie.' Clash commented: 'The Peckham artist excels by channelling a laid back, jazz-inspired vibe, a highly creative songwriting stance that seems to grow with each passing track.'

Cosmo described the EP as: "A documentation of my youth as an ode to my thoughts and feelings, with personal experiences and personal samples. Such as the last track 'Great Dane', which begins and ends with a clip from 'Just William' that I listened to and loved as a child… Fraser T. Smith and I really worked with creating a live sound.”

In late 2020, Cosmo released the title track from his new EP A Piper For Janet through his own label, Pykrete Records. ‘Piper’ is a reference to artist John Piper; Janet is Cosmo’s beloved late grandmother. The EP was written over a few years while Cosmo was touring across South America and Asia. The rest of the EP was released in January 2021, with the tracklist: ‘A Piper For Janet’, ‘Filet Mignon’, ‘Railroad Tracks’ and ‘Seasick’.

In late 2021, Cosmo was invited to the Brodie Sessions in Denmark to perform an acoustic set paired with the host's audio-visual production. It was released in January 2022.

Cosmo finally released 'Curser's Lament' as an official single (and the title track of the forthcoming EP) on March 29, 2023 answering calls from his fans since the demo version surfaced online in 2016. The EP was released on May 5 with the tracklist: 'Curser's Lament', 'No Comply', 'What Can I Do?' and 'Awful Dawn'. Cosmo embarked on his first UK headline tour in May 2023, followed by more new music and live dates later in the calendar year.

In 2024, Cosmo released the single 'Outlaw' in January and 'Low', the forthcoming EP title track, in February. Cosmo says: "‘Low’ is for the fans. In my live shows years ago I played this song. It had a different name then, and the crowd responses were electric. From those moments they took it to their hearts, renamed it, and now I give it back to them. Thank you.” In April he embarked on his first headline European tour, culminating in London at Brixton Electric on April 25.

== Discography ==
=== EPs ===
- 2017: Just Cosmo (70Hz)
- 2021: A Piper For Janet (Pykrete Records)
- 2022: Brodie Sessions (Live) (Pykrete Records)
- 2023: Curser's Lament (Pykrete Records)
- 2024: Low (Pykrete Records)

== Press ==
Music Week 2016
‘[Cosmo’s EP due in 2017] bends his varying influences (Joni Mitchell, 9th Wonder, Mac DeMarco) into a breezy five-track introduction that could be the most interesting thing Fraser T. Smith has] put his name to in years.'

The Line Of Best Fit at The Great Escape 2017
‘Cosmo Pyke is one of the most effortlessly talented acts of the weekend. [He] strokes his guitar as if swishing through water - fitting, really, as his lo-fi jazz-pop easily lulls the crowd into a blissful trance… Pyke sings about the pleasing banalities of life on a wave of fidgety song structures and complex time signatures. While his voice flirts with soul but lacks a polished finish there's a quirky charm to his tone that, judging by the packed-out Prince Albert, has garnered him a whole host of committed fans.’

The Guardian, 2017
‘If Pyke sounds like a refreshingly different kind of artist, then that’s because he is… an extraordinary personality: like his musicianship – simultaneously catchy and slack – he possesses both the brilliant confidence and unconstructed thought process of someone still figuring things out.’

Dazed 100, No.14, 2017
‘This blissed out musical wunderkind is exporting chronic sunshine from his Peckham bedroom… His Just Cosmo EP deals with a range of topics (some darker than others…) but it’s always his playful personality that shines through.’

The NME 100: Essential new music for 2018
‘We’ve decided that these are, without doubt, the 100 new artists rock-solid guaranteed to make 2018 a magnificent year for your ears… [Cosmo Pyke x Chronic Sunshine] Sounds like: Sunshine-filled pop guaranteed to put a spring in your step… there’s reason to believe the artist has the chops to make it to that level [of Frank Ocean, whose video he appeared in].’

Bandwagon Asia, Cosmo makes his mark in Singapore, 2018
“[Cosmo] is one of the many emerging cultural icons of his generation… this gig proved that he was not only masterful at musically encapsulating the wistfulness of youth but also at being a great performer.”

KTSW, A Piper For Janet EP review, 2021
“Pyke has leveled up exponentially… This [title track] feels huge… Cosmo’s soulful songwriting ability shines the most through [track Filet Mignon]... the genius behind the lyricism in this song is evident… [On song Railroad Tracks] Pyke does this [scream] so effortlessly you would think he was a hall of fame rockstar… this record has the markings of a future legend and a household name… [Seasick sounds like] something composed by the great Frank Zappa…’

Fraser T. Smith via Music Business Worldwide ‘MBW World’s Greatest Producers’, 2022
‘I’ve just been very fortunate to be around great artists… with my label, 70Hz… I’m able to shine a spotlight on incredible talent. And that must always, in some way, shine… It doesn’t always have to be a Dave or a Stormzy. It could be Cosmo Pyke, whose first EP we did. It could be Claire Maguire…”

Billboard - ‘10 Cool New Pop Songs to Get You Through The Week’, May 2023
‘A collective sigh of relief can be heard from Cosmo Pyke’s fans, as the British artist has delivered the new EP Curser’s Lament. “What Can I Do?” from the set shows off Pyke’s talent with jazz melodies, while catering to fans of his more introductory, alternative and indie-leaning work featured on 2017’s Just Cosmo. The musician cleverly splits the song into three separate parts, first drawing in the listener with drum heavy instrumentation, leading in with up tempo guitar licks before a soulful finish.' - Starr Bowenbank
