= Apricot Princess =

Studio album by Rex Orange County
- Released: 26 April 2017
- Genre: Indie pop; alternative rock; hip-hop
- Length: 39:30
- Label: Self-released
- Producer: Rex Orange County; Ben Baptie; Jeff Kleinman; Two Inch Punch; Michael Uzowuru

Rex Orange County chronology
Bcos U Will Never B Free (2015)	Apricot Princess (2017)	Pony (2019)

Singles from Apricot Princess
- 1. "Untitled" Released: 19 April 2017; 2. "Never Enough" Released: 26 April 2017

Apricot Princess is the second studio album by the English musician Rex Orange County. It was released independently on 26 April 2017.

== Promotion ==
=== Singles ===
The album was preceded by its only single, "Untitled", released on 19 April 2017, alongside its music video.

=== Other songs ===
The album's ninth track, "Never Enough", was featured in the soundtrack for the 2017 video game FIFA 18.

== Track listing ==
All tracks written and produced by Alex "Rex Orange County" O'Connor, except where noted.

No.	Title	Writer(s)	Producer(s)	Length
1.	"Apricot Princess"			3:58
2.	"Television / So Far So Good"			4:23
3.	"Nothing" (featuring Marco McKinnis)	O'Connor; McKinnis		4:53
4.	"Sycamore Girl"	O'Connor; Thea Morgan-Murrell		4:40
5.	"Untitled"			2:16
6.	"4 Seasons"		Rex Orange County; Ben Baptie	5:02
7.	"Waiting Room"		Michael Uzowuru; Jeff Kleinman; Rex Orange County	4:00
8.	"Rain Man"			0:44
9.	"Never Enough"		Rex Orange County; Two Inch Punch	4:58
10.	"Happiness"			4:40
Total length:				39:30

== Personnel ==
- Rex Orange County – production (all tracks), programming (tracks 1–4, 6, 9, 10), string arrangement (tracks 1, 4, 6, 10), guitars (tracks 2, 7, 9, 10), keyboards (track 2, 9, 10), drums (tracks 1, 9), piano (tracks 7, 8), percussion (track 1), bass (track 7)
- Ben Baptie – production (track 6), recording engineering (tracks 1–4, 6, 8–10), mix engineering (all tracks)
- Michael Uzowuru – production (track 7)
- Jeff Kleinman – production (track 7), keyboards (track 7), bass (track 7), recording engineering (track 7)
- Two Inch Punch – production (track 9), recording engineering (tracks 5, 8, 9)
- Marco McKinnis – feature vocals (track 3)
- Thea Morgan-Murrell – feature vocals (track 4), additional vocals (track 1)
- Joe MacLaren – double bass (tracks 1, 4) electric bass (tracks 1, 3, 6, 9)
- Mike Underwood – saxophone (track 8)
- Haydn Bendall – organ (track 10), string arrangement (track 6), recording engineering (tracks 1, 4, 6, 10)
- Tom Pigott Smith – violin (tracks 1, 4, 6, 10)
- Alison Dods – violin (tracks 1, 4, 6, 10)
- Calina de la Mare – violin (tracks 1, 4, 6, 10)
- Peter Hanson – violin (tracks 1, 4, 6, 10)
- Reiad Chibah – viola (tracks 1, 4, 6, 10)
- Danny Keane – viola (tracks 1, 4, 6, 10)
- Ian Burdge – cello (tracks 1, 4, 6, 10)
- Danny Keane – cello (tracks 1, 4, 6, 10)
- John Davis – mastering engineering

== Charts ==
Chart (2018)	Peak position
Scottish Albums (OCC)	91
UK Independent Albums (OCC)	24
UK Physical Albums (OCC)	96
UK Vinyl Albums (OCC)	12
US Top Current Albums (Billboard)	49
US Heatseekers Albums (Billboard)	2
US Independent Albums (Billboard)	8
US Top Alternative Album Sales (Billboard)	6
US Top Rock Album Sales (Billboard)	16

== Certifications ==
Region	Certification	Certified units/sales
United Kingdom (BPI)	Silver	60,000^{‡}
^{‡} Sales+streaming figures based on certification alone.
