= The Alexander Technique (album) =

Studio album by Rex Orange County
- Released: 6 September 2024
- Length: 53:07
- Label: RCA
- Producers: James Blake; Teo Halm; Alex O'Connor; Jim Reed

Rex Orange County chronology
Who Cares? (2022)	The Alexander Technique (2024)	Dream Fatigue (2026)

Singles from The Alexander Technique
- 1. "Alexander" Released: 18 July 2024; 2. "Guitar Song" Released: 18 July 2024; 3. "The Table" Released: 6 August 2024

The Alexander Technique is the fifth studio album by the English musician Rex Orange County. It was released on 6 September 2024 through RCA Records.

== Track listing ==
The Alexander Technique track listing
No.	Title	Writer(s)	Producer(s)	Length
1.	"Alexander"	O'Connor	O'Connor	4:44
2.	"Guitar Song"	O'Connor; Teo Halm; Jim Reed	O'Connor; Halm; Reed^{[a]}	3:57
3.	"2008"	O'Connor; Angelo de Augustine; Halm; Reed; Sufjan Stevens	O'Connor; Halm; Reed	2:33
4.	"Therapy"	O'Connor; Halm; Cory Henry	O'Connor; Halm; Reed^{[a]}	4:05
5.	"4 in the Morning"	O'Connor	O'Connor; Reed^{[v]}	2:07
6.	"Jealousy"	O'Connor	O'Connor; Reed^{[a]}	4:00
7.	"The Table"	O'Connor	O'Connor; Halm; Reed	2:53
8.	"Pure"	O'Connor	O'Connor; Reed	4:05
9.	"One of These Days"	O'Connor; Sally Herbert; Michael Underwood	O'Connor; Reed	2:31
10.	"Carrera"	O'Connor	O'Connor; Reed^{[a]}	2:16
11.	"Much Too Much"	O'Connor; Reed	O'Connor; Reed	3:18
12.	"Sliding Doors"	O'Connor; Reed; Underwood	O'Connor; Reed	3:20
13.	"Lost for Words"	O'Connor; Halm	O'Connor; Halm	3:22
14.	"Look Me in the Eyes" (featuring James Blake)	O'Connor; James Blake	O'Connor; Blake	3:44
15.	"New Years"	O'Connor; Reed	O'Connor; Reed	3:09
16.	"Finally"	O'Connor; Halm; Reed; Celso Valli; Paolo Zavallone	O'Connor; Halm; Reed^{[a]}	3:03
Total length:				53:07

Note

- ^{^[a]} signifies an additional producer
- ^{^[v]} signifies a vocal producer

== Personnel ==
Musicians

- Alex O'Connor – lead vocals (all tracks), piano (tracks 1, 6, 16), strings (2, 6, 8, 11, 15, 16), drums (2), electric guitar (3, 5–8, 15), synthesizer (3–5, 9–11), programming (4, 8, 11), bass guitar (6–8, 11); glockenspiel, organ (6); synth bass (11), keyboards (15)
- David Wrench – programming
- Teo Halm – programming (tracks 2, 3, 7, 13, 16), acoustic guitar, bass guitar (2, 13); background vocals, drum machine, horn (2); electric guitar (3, 13), organ (4), synthesizer (7), trumpet (13)
- Everton Nelson – concertmaster (tracks 2, 4, 6, 8, 11, 13, 15, 16)
- Chris Worsey – cello (tracks 2, 4, 6, 8, 11, 13, 15, 16)
- Ian Burdge – cello (tracks 2, 4, 6, 8, 11, 13, 15, 16)
- Sophie Harris – cello (tracks 2, 4, 6, 8, 11, 13, 15, 16)
- Stacey Watton – double bass (tracks 2, 4, 6, 8, 11, 13, 15, 16)
- Sally Herbert – strings (tracks 2, 4, 6, 8, 11, 13, 15, 16)
- Bruce White – viola (tracks 2, 4, 6, 8, 11, 13, 15, 16)
- Fiona Bonds –viola (tracks 2, 4, 6, 8, 11, 13, 15, 16)
- John Metcalfe – viola (tracks 2, 4, 6, 8, 11, 13, 15, 16)
- Reiad Chibah – viola (tracks 2, 4, 6, 8, 11, 13, 15, 16)
- Alison Dods – violin (tracks 2, 4, 6, 8, 11, 13, 15, 16)
- Ian Humphries – violin (tracks 2, 4, 6, 8, 11, 13, 15, 16)
- Marianne Haynes – violin (tracks 2, 4, 6, 8, 11, 13, 15, 16)
- Natalia Bonner – violin (tracks 2, 4, 6, 8, 11, 13, 15, 16)
- Richard George – violin (tracks 2, 4, 6, 8, 11, 13, 15, 16)
- Rick Koster – violin (tracks 2, 4, 6, 8, 11, 13, 15, 16)
- Tom Pigott-Smith – violin (tracks 2, 4, 6, 8, 11, 13, 15, 16)
- Joe MacLaren – double bass (track 2), bass guitar (3), piano (16)
- Michael Underwood – saxophone (tracks 2, 7, 9, 16), bass clarinet (2, 7, 12, 16), brass (9, 16), flute (11, 12); acoustic guitar (12), piano (12)
- Johnny Woodham – trumpet (tracks 2, 9, 16)
- Reuben James – electric guitar (track 2), piano (11, 16), organ (11), synthesizer (16)
- Finn Carter – piano (track 2), synthesizer (12)
- Tyler Gilmore – loops (track 2)
- Jim Reed – programming (3, 4, 7, 8, 11, 15, 16), synthesizer (3, 4, 9, 12), bass guitar (8, 10), acoustic guitar (11), organ (11), strings (11, 15, 16), keyboards (15), piano (16)
- Cory Henry – organ (track 4)
- The Brass Rascals – brass (tracks 9, 16)
- Ed Parr – trombone (tracks 9, 16)
- Joe Bristow – trombone (tracks 9, 16)
- Tim Quicke – trumpet (tracks 9, 16)
- Tom Briers – tuba (tracks 9, 16)
- Pino Palladino – bass guitar (tracks 10, 12, 15, 16)
- Henry Webb Jenkins – pedal steel guitar (track 13)
- James Blake – vocals, piano (track 14)

Technical

- Matt Colton – mastering
- David Wrench – mixing
- Chloe Kraemer – engineering (tracks 1–12, 15)
- Tom Archer – engineering (tracks 2–13, 15)
- Tyler Gilmore –engineering (track 2)
- Nathaniel Alfred – engineering (track 4)
- Dylan Neustadter – engineering (tracks 13, 14)
- Damien Lewis – engineering (track 16)
- Grace Banks – engineering assistance
- Tim Pennells – engineering assistance
- Rob Sellens – engineering assistance (1)
- Ed Farrell – engineering assistance (tracks 2, 4, 6, 8, 9, 11, 13, 15, 16)
- Matt Jones – engineering assistance (tracks 2, 4, 6, 8, 9, 11, 13, 15, 16)
- Vinicius Lima – engineering assistance (tracks 2, 3)
- Jon Sher – engineering assistance (tracks 4, 14)
- Harpaal Sanghera – engineering assistance (track 4)
- Fran Edwards – engineering assistance (tracks 7, 9)
- Luke Farnell – engineering assistance (track 12)
- Noah Rastegar – engineering assistance (track 16)

== Charts ==
Chart performance for The Alexander Technique
Chart (2024)	Peak position
Australian Albums (ARIA)	77
Scottish Albums (Official Charts)	10
UK Albums (Official Charts)	15
US Billboard 200	151
US Top Rock & Alternative Albums (Billboard)	32
