= Pluto Projector =

Single by Rex Orange County

from the album Pony
- Released: 17 October 2019
- Studio: Strongroom Studios, London
- Genre: Pop
- Length: 4:27
- Label: RCA
- Songwriter(s): Rex Orange County
- Producer(s): Rex Orange County; Ben Baptie

Rex Orange County singles chronology
"10/10" (2019)	"Pluto Projector" (2019)	"Face to Face" (2019)

Licensed audio
- "Pluto Projector" on YouTube

"Pluto Projector" is a song by the English singer Rex Orange County, from his third studio album, Pony (2019). The song was released on 17 October 2019, as the second single from the album, and was written by Rex Orange County, who produced the song with Ben Baptie.

== Background and release ==
Rex Orange County first teased the song on 16 October 2019, posting a telephone number on social media, which when called, played the song's first verse. On the same day, he posted a video of an orchestra playing, with the caption, "Pluto Projector", to social media. It was released as the second single from Pony the following day, where Rex Orange County revealed it was the album's seventh track.

== Composition and lyrics ==
The song's sheet music, published at Musicnotes.com by Universal Music Publishing, shows that the song is written in the key of C major with a tempo of 80 beats per minute. The vocals in the song span from the low note of B♭3 to the high note of G5. The song is most known for its orchestral ending, which Affinity Magazine's Daryl Perry said put the listener at an "emotional climax".

NME described the song as a "slow-burning cut of emotive pop", while NPR described the song as a "semi-downtempo acoustic track" where Rex Orange County meditates on "the existential", singing; "What if all this counts for nothing, everything I thought I'd be/What if by the time I realize, it's too far to see?". Lyrically, the song is about Rex fantasizing a future life with his lover, and includes subtle remarks from Rex Orange County about becoming famous as a teenager; "I'm still a boy inside my thoughts / Am I meant to understand my faults?"

== Charts ==
Weekly chart performance for "Pluto Projector"
Chart (2019)	Peak position
New Zealand Hot Singles Chart (Recorded Music NZ)	17
US Hot Rock & Alternative Songs (Billboard)	7

== Certifications ==
Certifications for "Pluto Projector"
Region	Certification	Certified units/sales
Australia (ARIA)	Platinum	70,000^{‡}
Canada (Music Canada)	Platinum	80,000^{‡}
New Zealand (RMNZ)	Platinum	30,000^{‡}
United Kingdom (BPI)	Silver	200,000^{‡}
United States (RIAA)	Platinum	1,000,000^{‡}
^{‡} Sales+streaming figures based on certification alone.
