= Bcos U Will Never B Free =

Studio album by Rex Orange County
- Released: 4 September 2015
- Recorded: 2014–2015
- Genre: Indie; hip hop; alternative
- Length: 29:23
- Label: Self-released
- Producer: Rex Orange County

Rex Orange County chronology
Bcos U Will Never B Free (2015)	Apricot Princess (2017)

Singles from Bcos U Will Never B Free
- 1. "Corduroy Dreams" Released: 18 May 2015; 2. "Japan" Released: 25 June 2015

Bcos U Will Never B Free is the debut studio album (Note: The project's status as a mixtape or a studio album has been largely debated. In more recent years, Rex Orange County and other sources count the album as his first studio album.) by the English musician Rex Orange County. It was released free of charge on Bandcamp and SoundCloud on 4 September 2015, and officially on 7 November 2016. Following its five year anniversary, the album was released on vinyl for the first time.

== Background ==
Rex Orange County taught himself to make his own music at the age of 16, producing on the digital audio workstation Logic, and playing the guitar. Bcos U Will Never B Free was created between the summer of 2014 and 2015 on his bedroom floor, and was inspired due to "teen angst" according to Rex Orange County, stating that during the album's recording, he was "really angry", "kind of sad", and "self pitying".

In 2020, Rex Orange County further talked about how the album was created, stating he felt he "had a lot [he] wanted to say." He said he didn't have a strong intention with the album and that he had simply felt determined to "make something and put it out to the world."

== Promotion ==
=== Singles ===
The album's lead single, "Corduroy Dreams", was released to SoundCloud on 18 May 2015. It has received a Silver certification from the British Phonographic Industry.

The album's second single, "Japan", was released to SoundCloud on 25 June 2015. Its music video was released on 12 November 2015, and shows Rex Orange County getting his head shaved.

=== Performances ===
Rex Orange County held a live performance celebrating the album on 4 September 2020, performing a medley of the songs "A Song About Being Sad", "Belly (The Grass Stains)", and "Corduroy Dreams".

== Track listing ==
All songs written by Alex "Rex Orange County" O'Connor (with the exception of "Cape Fear", written and performed by Cosmo Pyke).

2016 reissue
No.	Title	Length
1.	"Rex (Intro)"	1:47
2.	"Paradise"	3:37
3.	"Belly (The Grass Stains)"	4:19
4.	"Corduroy Dreams"	3:26
5.	"Japan"	1:46
6.	"Portrait of Ned"	1:53
7.	"Green Eyes, Pt. II"	3:20
8.	"A Song About Being Sad"	2:16
9.	"Know Love"	4:01
10.	"Curfew..."	1:44
Total length:		28:12

Original 2015 release and select vinyl versions
No.	Title	Length
3.	"Cape Fear (feat. Cosmo Pyke)"	1:11
Total length:		29:23

== Charts ==
Chart performance for Bcos U Will Never B Free
Chart (2020)	Peak position
Australian Charts (ARIA)	28
UK Albums Sales Chart (OCC)	26
US Top Album Sales (Billboard)	13
US Top Alternative Albums (Billboard)	23
US Top Rock Albums (Billboard)	49
US Vinyl Albums (Billboard)	3

== Release history ==
Region	Date	Format	Edition	Label
Various	4 September 2015	Digital download; streaming	11-track free of charge	Self-released
Various	7 November 2016	Digital download; streaming	10-track	Self-released
Various	4 September 2020	LP	11-track	RCA Records
