= Pony (Rex Orange County album) =

Studio album by Rex Orange County
- Released: 25 October 2019
- Recorded: 2018–2019
- Studios: Strongroom (East London); Air Studios (London, England)
- Genres: Indie pop; jazz; neo-soul
- Length: 33:58
- Label: RCA
- Producers: Rex Orange County; Ben Baptie

Rex Orange County chronology
Apricot Princess (2017)	Pony (2019)	Who Cares? (2022)

Singles from Pony
- 1. "10/10" Released: 12 September 2019; 2. "Pluto Projector" Released: 17 October 2019; 3. "Face to Face" Released: 23 October 2019

Pony is the third studio album and major-label debut by the English musician Rex Orange County. It was released on 25 October 2019, through RCA Records. The album was primarily recorded at Strongroom Studios in East London, with orchestral recordings taking place at Air Studios. Rex wrote all ten tracks, and produced them with Ben Baptie.

Lyrically, the album explores human emotion, and takes inspiration from personal struggles Rex faced throughout his rise to prominence in 2017 and 2018. Pony was supported by three singles: "10/10", "Pluto Projector", and "Face to Face". The album received favorable reviews; its lyrical content receiving both criticism and compliments. It debuted at number three on the US Billboard 200, marking his first entry on the chart. The album reached the top ten in five other countries, including Canada and the United Kingdom.

== Background ==
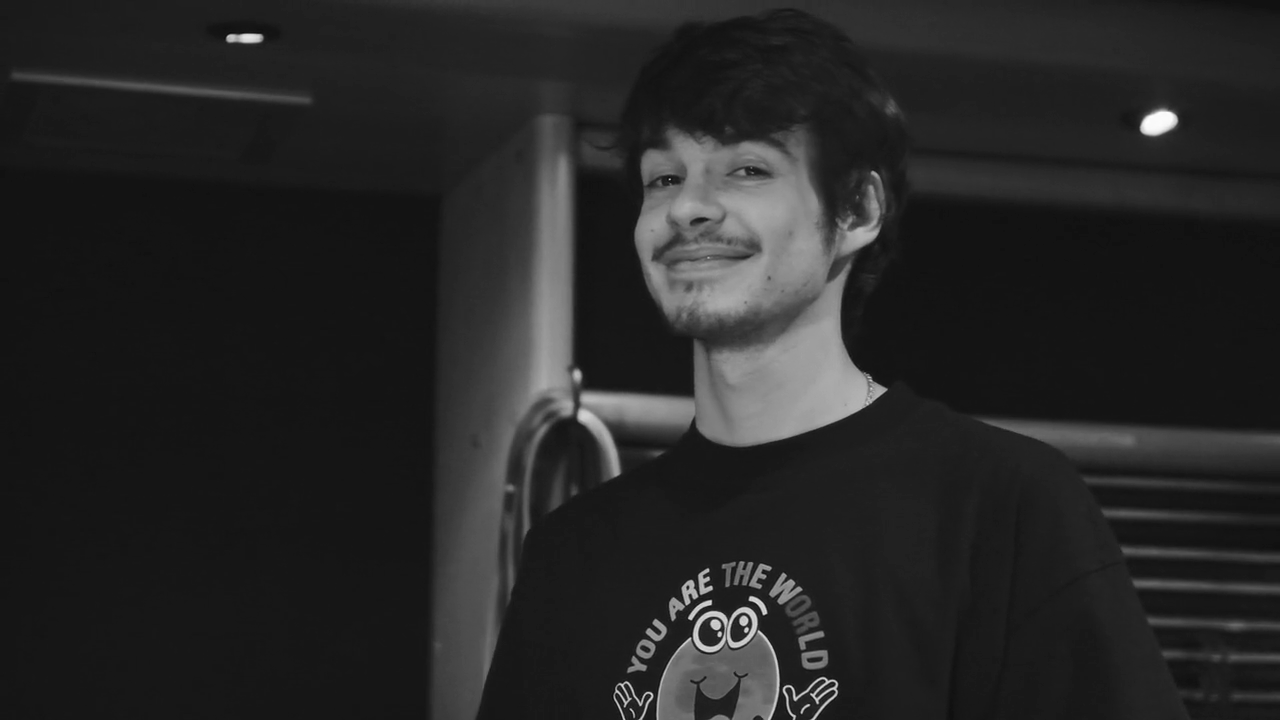
Rex Orange County (pictured in 2019) at Air Studios

Rex Orange County rose to prominence throughout 2017 and 2018, selling out his first four shows in the United States, visiting festivals such as Primavera Sound and the Panorama Music Festival, and contributing to the American rapper Tyler, the Creator's fourth studio album, Flower Boy (2017). In an interview with Billboard on 15 February 2018, Rex revealed a follow-up to his second studio album, Apricot Princess (2017), was in development. With his next album, he wanted to explore new topics, as he believed "some of the best songs aren't actually love songs". Little information about the project was revealed throughout 2019. He released the stand-alone single, "New House", on 14 February 2019, which was his first release since 2017.

On 4 September 2019, Rex started to tease his third studio album through Twitter. Eight days later, he announced that the album's lead single, "10/10", would be released on the same day. He officially revealed the album's title, tracklist, and artwork on 19 September 2019, alongside its release date of 25 October 2019, and a tour to support the album. On 16 October 2019, he released a video on social media, showcasing the recording of the orchestral section for the album's second single, "Pluto Projector", at Air Studios.

== Composition ==
Musically, Pony is an indie pop, jazz, and neo soul record with influences of rock. Lyrically, the album explores Rex as he discovers his character, while also exploring human emotion, and documents the struggles he faced throughout the years prior to the album.

In an interview with Hot Press, Rex revealed that the album's title was simply due to his liking of the word. Finding difficulty in adjusting to pressure from newfound commercial success, Rex believed he had grown out of the musical stylings from his prior material, such as "Corduroy Dreams" and "Sunflower". With Pony, he wanted to make an album he would love, while not being too different from his older music.

== Promotion ==
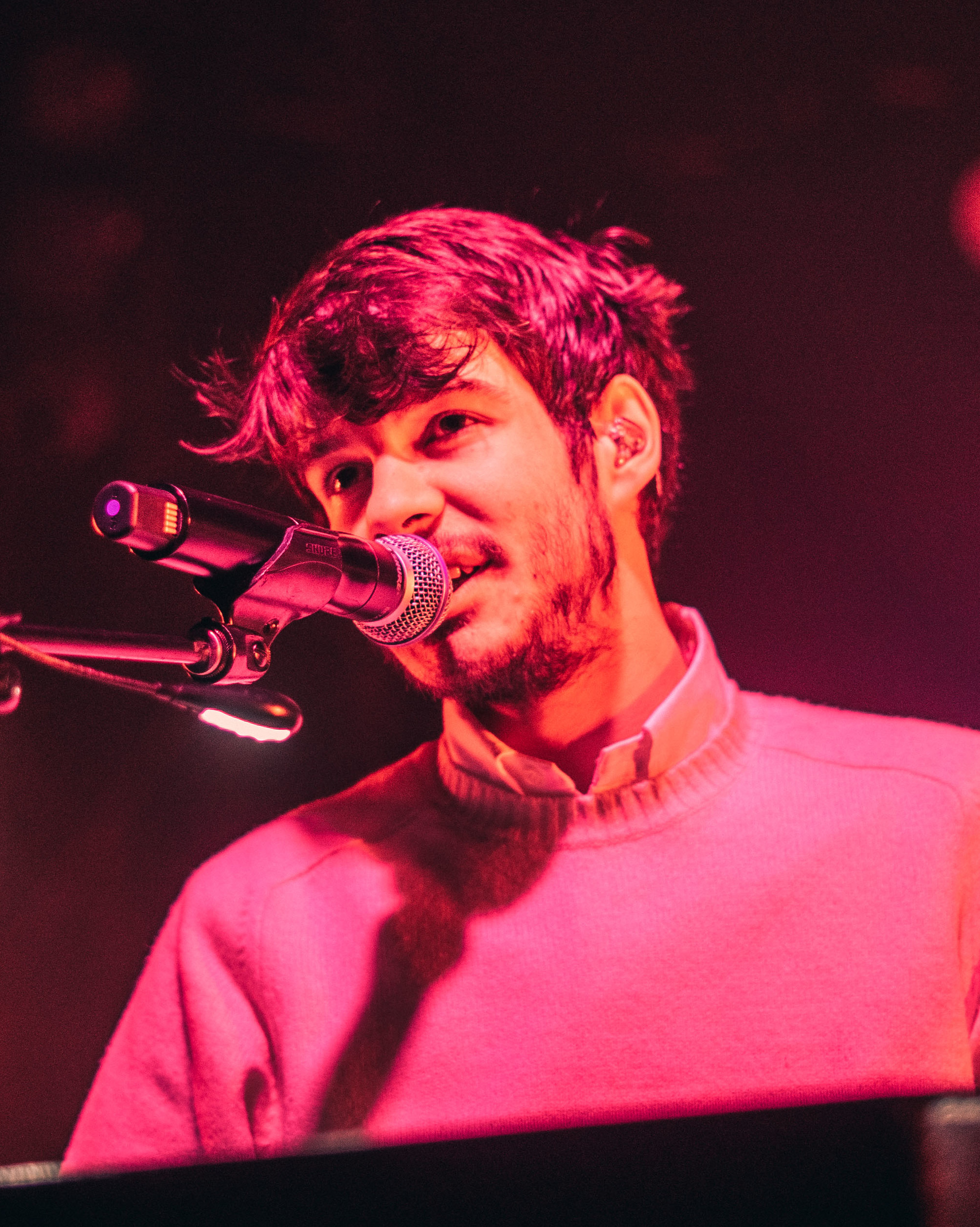
Rex Orange County performing in Denver, Colorado during The Pony Tour in January 2020.

=== Singles ===
"10/10" was first previewed on 12 September 2019, through BBC Radio 1. The song and its music video were released the same day, as the lead single from the album. The song peaked at number 68 on the UK Singles Chart.

"Pluto Projector" was released as the album's second single on 17 October 2019. The song peaked at number 7 on Billboard's Hot Rock Songs chart.

"Face to Face" was released as the album's third and final single on 23 October 2019. The song peaked at number 86 on the UK Singles Chart.

=== Performances ===
Rex performed "10/10" for the first time on 24 September 2019, alongside a cover of "I Don't Care" by Ed Sheeran and Justin Bieber for BBC Radio 1's Live Lounge. On 11 October 2019, he performed "10/10" for The Tonight Show Starring Jimmy Fallon. He performed "Pluto Projector" live at Rak Studios on 23 November 2019. In his debut appearance on The Ellen DeGeneres Show, he performed "Face to Face" on 8 January 2020. On 18 March 2020, he performed "Pluto Projector" and "Always" alongside two other songs for NPR's Tiny Desk concert. He appeared at BBC Radio 1's Big Weekend music festival on 24 May 2020, performing "Pluto Projector". On 30 September 2020, he released an extended play consisting of live performances of songs from Pony and his other two projects, Apricot Princess and Bcos U Will Never B Free (2015), recorded during a show at the Radio City Music Hall in New York City.

A live performance of the album's closing track, "It's Not the Same Anymore", was released on 5 March 2021, following an increase of the song's usage on the social media app TikTok.

=== Tour ===
Rex Orange County announced a tour in promotion of Pony, entitled The Pony Tour, on 19 September 2019, which visited the United Kingdom, Ireland, and the United States. The tour began on 13 November 2019, and ended on 27 February 2020. Tour dates in Asia were announced in December 2019, but were cancelled in October 2020, due to concerns regarding the COVID-19 pandemic.

== Critical reception ==
Professional ratings
Aggregate scores
Source	Rating
AnyDecentMusic?	7.4/10
Metacritic	76/100
Review scores
Source	Rating
AllMusic	3.5/5 stars
American Songwriter	4/5 stars
DIY	4.5/5 stars
Financial Times	4/5 stars
The Guardian	3/5 stars
NME	5/5 stars
The Observer	3/5 stars
Pitchfork	5.0/10
Q	4/5 stars
The Times	4/5 stars

Pony received generally favorable reviews from critics upon release. At Metacritic, which assigns a normalized rating out of 100 to reviews from mainstream publications, the album received an average score of 76, based on 11 reviews, indicating "generally favorable" reviews.

Hannah Mylrea from NME rated the album five out of five stars, writing that it was a "dazzling follow up to Apricot Princess," and that although the world might be "miserable" and "going to shit," Mylrea wrote that it would not be possible for the listener to listen to Pony without "feeling a little bit more optimistic about the future." Elly Watson expressed similar views in DIY magazine, describing it as "equal parts heart wrenching and hopeful".

Giving the album an average 3 out of 5, Tara Joshi at The Guardian described the album as "jaunty and engaging", though Joshi expressed that "Pony meanders, seemingly unaware of its purpose".

Luke Levenson from American Songwriter rated the album four out of five stars, writing: "His unique pop prosody and production skills, more sophisticated than ever in Pony, foretell that his sound will continue progressing to new creative heights, with the heft of catchy pop music and the inventiveness of its growing indie subgenre."

== Commercial performance ==
Pony debuted at number three on the US Billboard 200, earning 70,000 equivalent album sales, being boosted by a concert ticket and album sale redemption. The album debuted behind Post Malone's Hollywood's Bleeding and Kanye West's Jesus is King.

== Track listing ==
All songs produced by Rex Orange County and Ben Baptie.

No.	Title	Length
1.	"10/10"	2:26
2.	"Always"	3:17
3.	"Laser Lights"	2:11
4.	"Face to Face"	3:39
5.	"Stressed Out"	1:46
6.	"Never Had the Balls"	3:56
7.	"Pluto Projector"	4:27
8.	"Every Way"	2:13
9.	"It Gets Better"	3:32
10.	"It's Not the Same Anymore"	6:26
Total length:		33:58

== Personnel ==
Credits for Pony adapted from AllMusic.

- Rex Orange County – vocals, guitar, bass, drum programming, drums, Fender Rhodes, keyboards, organ, percussion, piano, producer, saxophone, strings, synthesizer, vocoder, woodwind
- Ben Baptie – guitar, drum programming, brass, saxophone, woodwind, strings, percussion, production, mixing
- Sally Herbert – arrangement, conducting, strings, violin
- Pino Palladino – bass
- Michael Underwood – clarinet, flute, saxophone, woodwind arrangement
- Nick Barr – viola
- Natalia Bonner – violin
- Seb Brooks - viola
- Ian Burdge – cello
- Reiad Chibah – viola
- Calina de la Mare – violin
- Louisa Fuller – violin
- Richard George – violin
- Ian Humphries – violin
- Oli Langford – violin
- John Metcalfe – viola
- Steve Morris – violin
- Tom Pigott-Smith – violin
- Rachel Robson – viola
- Tony Wollard – cello
- Chris Worsey – cello
- Amy Stewart – string conductor
- Haydn Bendall – string engineer
- Johnny Woodham – trumpet
- Choir: Karima Abdi, Ayana Ahmed, Abdul Akbari, Zainab Al-Shammary, Mahad Ali, Retaj Almataj, Ghena Alshteiwi, Emily Amoura, Junaid Attoh, Vihan Bhudia, Nelu Dobie, Adelina Gherman, Luke Halpin, Mosda Hisharizada, Sarah Jabir, Isa Khalid, Salam Al Lakod, Lisa Marie Massiah, José Mendes, Vanessa Prilogran, Gabi Sandru, Farah Siddique, Houda Warsama, Mohammad Zalghara
- Thea Morgan-Murrell – backing vocals (track 6)

Production

- Bráulio Amado – design, illustrations
- Madeleine Pfull – paintings
- Tom Archer – assistant
- Natasha Canter – assistant
- Alex Ferguson – assistant
- Ted Jensen – mastering

== Charts ==
=== Weekly charts ===
Chart (2019–2020)	Peak position
Australian Albums (ARIA)	4
Canadian Albums (Billboard)	3
Dutch Albums (Album Top 100)	75
Irish Albums (IRMA)	12
Lithuanian Albums (AGATA)	44
New Zealand Albums (RMNZ)	6
Portuguese Albums (AFP)	34
Scottish Albums (Official Charts)	10
UK Albums (Official Charts)	5
US Billboard 200	3
US Top Rock Albums (Billboard)	1

=== Year-end charts ===
Chart (2019)	Position
US Top Rock Albums (Billboard)	68

== Certifications ==
Region	Certification	Certified units/sales
Canada (Music Canada)	Gold	40,000^{‡}
New Zealand (RMNZ)	Gold	7,500^{‡}
United Kingdom (BPI)	Silver	60,000^{‡}
^{‡} Sales+streaming figures based on certification alone.
