= 10/10 (Rex Orange County song) =

Single by Rex Orange County

from the album Pony
- Released: 12 September 2019
- Genre: Rock
- Length: 2:26
- Label: RCA
- Songwriter: Rex Orange County
- Producers: Rex Orange County; Ben Baptie

Rex Orange County singles chronology
"New House" (2019)	"10/10" (2019)	"Pluto Projector" (2019)

Music video
- "10/10" on YouTube

"10/10" is a song by the English musician Rex Orange County, from his third studio album, Pony (2019). The song was released on 12 September 2019, as the lead single from the album. It was written by Rex Orange County, who produced the song with Ben Baptie.

== Background and release ==
Throughout 2019, no hints were revealed at the release of a new album from Rex Orange County, with only a stand-alone single being released from him, entitled "New House" on 14 February 2019. "10/10" was previewed for the first time during Rex Orange County's Glastonbury Festival set on 30 June 2019, where an image of the official set list revealed the song's title.

He first teased the release of his third studio album via Twitter on 4 September 2019, tweeting "REX3". He then revealed the song on 12 September 2019, announcing it would premiere on BBC Radio 1 with Annie Mac. Following the song's release on the same day, his second studio album, Pony, was announced a week later, on 19 September 2019, confirming "10/10" as the album's lead single.

== Composition and lyrics ==
The song's sheet music, published by Universal Music Publishing on Musicnotes.com, shows that the song is written in the key of E-flat major, and has a tempo of 94 beats per minute. The vocals in the song span from G3 to E♭5.

Billboard's Rania Aniftos described the song's sound as a "synth-y tune," while further writing that its lyrics were about "bouncing back" after reaching a low point in life, with the lines; "I had a year that nearly sent me off the edge / I feel like a five, I can't pretend / But if I get my shit together this year / Maybe I'll be a ten." Writing for NME, Nick Reilly wrote that the song reflects on Rex Orange County's own personal struggles, citing the same lines mentioned by Billboard.

== Music video ==
Directed by Warren Fu, the music video for "10/10" premiered on the same day as the song's release.

The video features what The Fader describes as "just another day at home," with Rex Orange County making music, cartoon ghosts coming to life, and dancing crash test dummies.

== Charts ==
Weekly chart performance for "10/10"
Chart (2019)	Peak position
New Zealand Hot Singles (Recorded Music NZ)	22
UK Singles (Official Charts)	68
US Hot Rock & Alternative Songs (Billboard)	6
US Rock & Alternative Airplay (Billboard)	20
