= Bráulio Amado =

Portuguese artist (born 1987)

Bráulio Amado (born 1987) is a Portuguese illustrator, graphic designer, and artist. He is best known for his record cover and poster designs.

== Biography ==
Amado was born in 1987 in Almada, Portugal. He grew up in Portugal and moved to New York City after graduating college. Before launching an independent studio practice, Amado worked as designer at Pentagram and Bloomberg Businessweek magazine, and as art director at the advertising agency Wieden+Kennedy. He gained recognition as independent artist through weekly poster designs for Good Room, a nightclub in Greenpoint, Brooklyn.

Amado designed album covers for musicians including Róisín Murphy, Frank Ocean, Robyn, Beck, Washed Out, The Juan MacLean, Rex Orange County, and Westerman. He was nominated for 2026 Grammy Award in Best Recording Package category for his design of Mac Miller's posthumous album Balloonerism. Amado is the cover artist of Harry Styles' 2026 album Kiss All The Time. Disco, Occasionally. He also did the art direction for the The Rolling Stones album Foreign Tongues.

Amado also created designs for fashion brands Opening Ceremony, Unspun, and Wasted Collective, cycling brand Rapha, and footwear brand Allbirds. His illustrations were featured in The New York Times Magazine, The New Yorker, and Wired.

Amado's graphic style earned acclaim for his use of humor, experimentation, and vibrant colors. His artworks often feature warped figure drawings, distorted or handwritten lettering, and photocopier-like textures.

For seven years between 2017 and 2023, Amado published annual portfolio books featuring works he created throughout the year, distributed by a Lisbon-based art book publisher Stolen Books. He received the Art Directors Club Young Guns Award in 2015.

Amado is gay. He illustrated Sassy Planet: A Queer Guide to 40 Cities, a 2021 travel guide to LGBTQ-friendly destinations around the world.
