= Benny Sings =

Dutch musician, songwriter, and producer

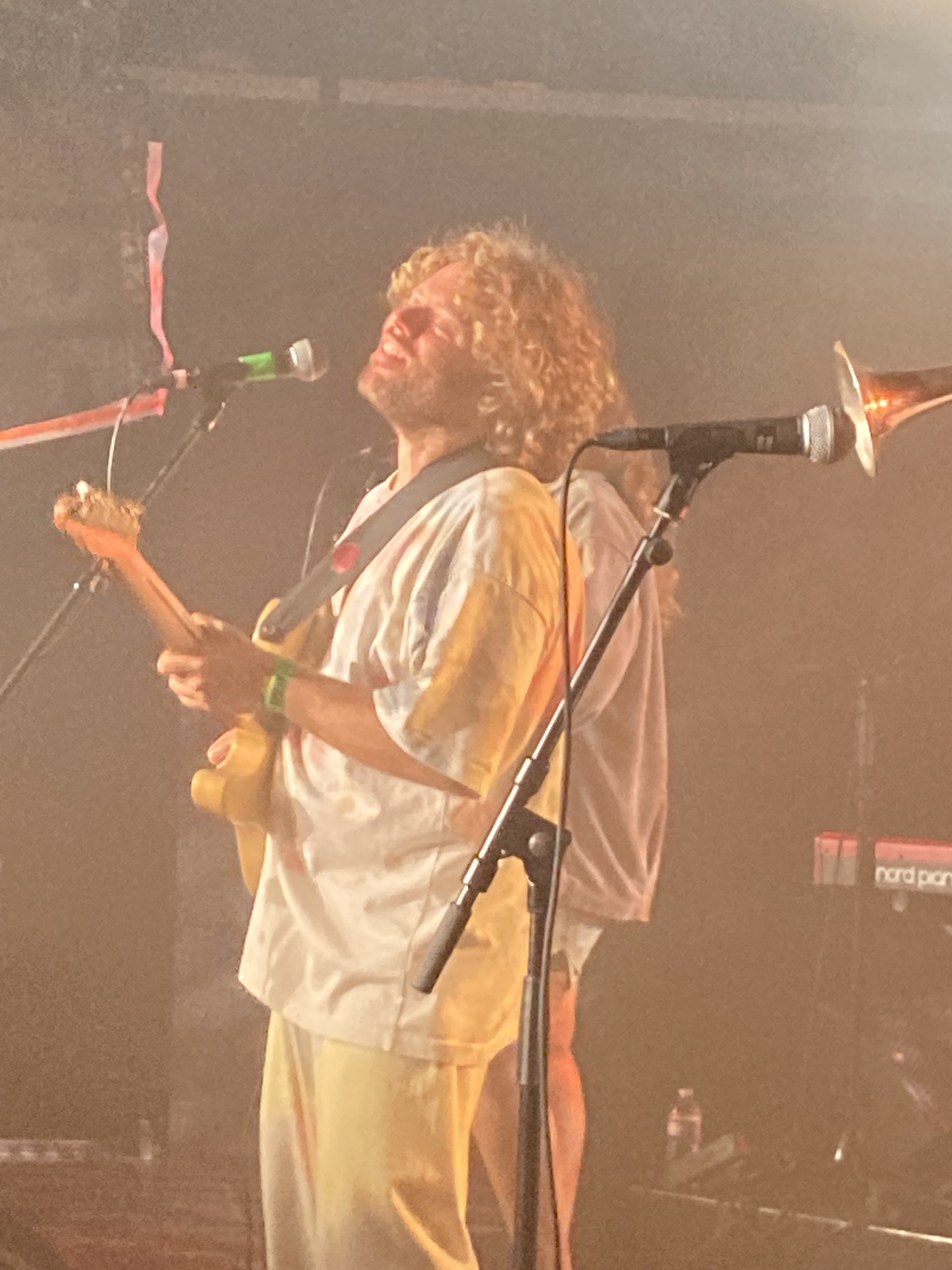
- Benny Sings performing in 2021

Background information
- Born: Tim van Berkestijn; 28 April 1977 (age 49); Dordrecht, Netherlands
- Origin: Amsterdam, Netherlands
- Genre: Pop
- Occupations: Musician; producer; songwriter
- Years active: 1999–present
- Labels: Stones Throw; Dox Records; Sonar Kollektiv; Sings Records
- Website: www.bennysings.com

Tim van Berkestijn (born 28 April 1977), better known by his stage name Benny Sings, is a Dutch pop musician, songwriter, and producer from the Netherlands. Since 2003, he has released twelve studio albums, including his most recent album, 2026’s 22 Durnham Dew on Stones Throw Records. He has since collaborated with many artists worldwide, like Mac DeMarco, Mocky, and Rex Orange County.

== Biography ==
Tim van Berkestijn was born in 1977 and raised in Dordrecht, a city in the Western Netherlands. He formed his first band, the Loveboat, in high school. He attended the Royal Conservatory of The Hague, where he studied sonology. He made beats under the name Benny V Kreamtits before changing his name to Benny Sings.

In 1999, Berkestijn adopted the stage name Benny Sings when he joined the Dutch hip hop group Abstract Dialect as a bassist. During this period, he also worked with hip hop collective De Toffen and the soul group Heavenly Social.

In 2003, Sings released his first solo album, Champagne People, which did well in the Netherlands and Europe. During the 2010s, Sings gained more attention in the United States. In 2017, he helped pen the Rex Orange County single "Loving Is Easy".

Beyond his solo career, Sings has collaborated with, written for, and produced many notable artists, including Mayer Hawthorne, Free Nationals, GoldLink, Mac DeMarco and Tom Misch. He also composed songs for the anime Carole & Tuesday. In 2022, Sings co-produced Rex Orange County's album Who Cares?, which debuted at number 5 on the Billboard 200.

Sings released the single "The Only One" on 26 October 2022. His album Young Hearts was released on Stones Throw Records on 24 March 2023, which he co-produced with Kenny Beats. Sings recorded a cover of "Time After Time" for the 2025 tribute album Chet Baker Re:imagined.

== Discography ==
=== Studio albums ===
Title	Details
Champagne People	Released: 22 August 2003; Label: Sonar Kollektiv; Formats: LP, CD, digital
EUH (with Rednose Distrikt)	Released: 1 May 2007; Label: Dox Records; Formats: LP, CD, digital
Benny... At Home	Released: 14 May 2007; Label: Sonar Kollektiv; Formats: LP, CD, digital
Art	Released: 27 May 2011; Label: Dox; Formats: LP, CD, digital
Studio	Released: 27 November 2015; Label: Dox; Formats: LP, CD, digital
Beat Tape	Released: 29 June 2018; Label: Stones Throw; Formats: LP, CD, digital
City Pop	Released: 22 February 2019; Label: Stones Throw; Formats: LP, CD, digital; Earlier version released in 2018 in Japan.
Music	Released: 9 April 2021; Label: Stones Throw; Formats: LP, CD, digital
Beat Tape II	Released: 10 December 2021; Label: Stones Throw; Formats: LP, Cassette, digital
Young Hearts	Released: 24 March 2023; Label: Stones Throw; Formats: LP, CD, digital
Beat Tape III	Released: 19 September 2025; Label: Stones Throw; Formats: LP, Cassette, digital
22 Durnham Dew	Released: 25 September 2026; Label: Stones Throw; Formats: LP, CD, digital

=== EPs ===
Title	Details
Santa Barbara	Released: 20 May 2022; Label: Stones Throw Records; Formats: Digital

=== Live albums ===
Title	Details
I Love You (Live at the Bimhuis)	Released: 14 February 2005; Label: Sonar Kollektiv; Formats: LP, CD, Digital

=== Compilations ===
Title	Details
The Best of Benny Sings	Released: 2 October 2012; Label: Dox Records; Formats: CD, Digital

=== As featured artist ===
- C-Mon – "Beggars for Sun" (Cereal, 2008)
- Che Grand – "Soraya's Jam" (Everything's Good Ugly, 2009)
- Knobsticker – "Hypothetical_Theoretical" (Forest Fruit, 2009)
- Scallymatic Orchestra – "All I Can Give" (Annie Get Your Gun, 2009)
- Kan Sano – "Go Nowhere" (2.0.1.1, 2014)
- Data – "Don't Sing" (Don't Sing, 2015)
- Koffie – "Hard Times" (Huntu, 2017)
- Instupendo – "Homme" (Friend of a Friend, 2017)
- Rex Orange County – "Loving is Easy" (2017)
- Onelight – "Aldehyde" (Vanderlay, 2018)
- Tuxedo – "Toast 2 Us" (Tuxedo III, 2019)
- Shuko & The Breed – "Life in Los Angeles" (Dippin', 2019)
- Blackwave. – "The Antidote" (Are We Still Dreaming?, 2019)
- Free Nationals – "Apartment" (Free Nationals, 2019)
- Les Cooles de Ville – "Starr People" (L.C.D.V., 2019)
- Intellextual – "Popstar" (Intellextual, 2019)
- Gosto – "The Other Way" (2019)
- Aaron Taylor – "Shooting Star" (Icarus, 2020)
- M.I.L.K. – "Prisoner" (Always Summer Somewhere, 2020)
- Yaffle – "The Child Inside" (Lost, Never Gone, 2020)
- Darius – "Rise" (Utopia, 2021)
