= Rex Orange County =

English musician (born 1998)

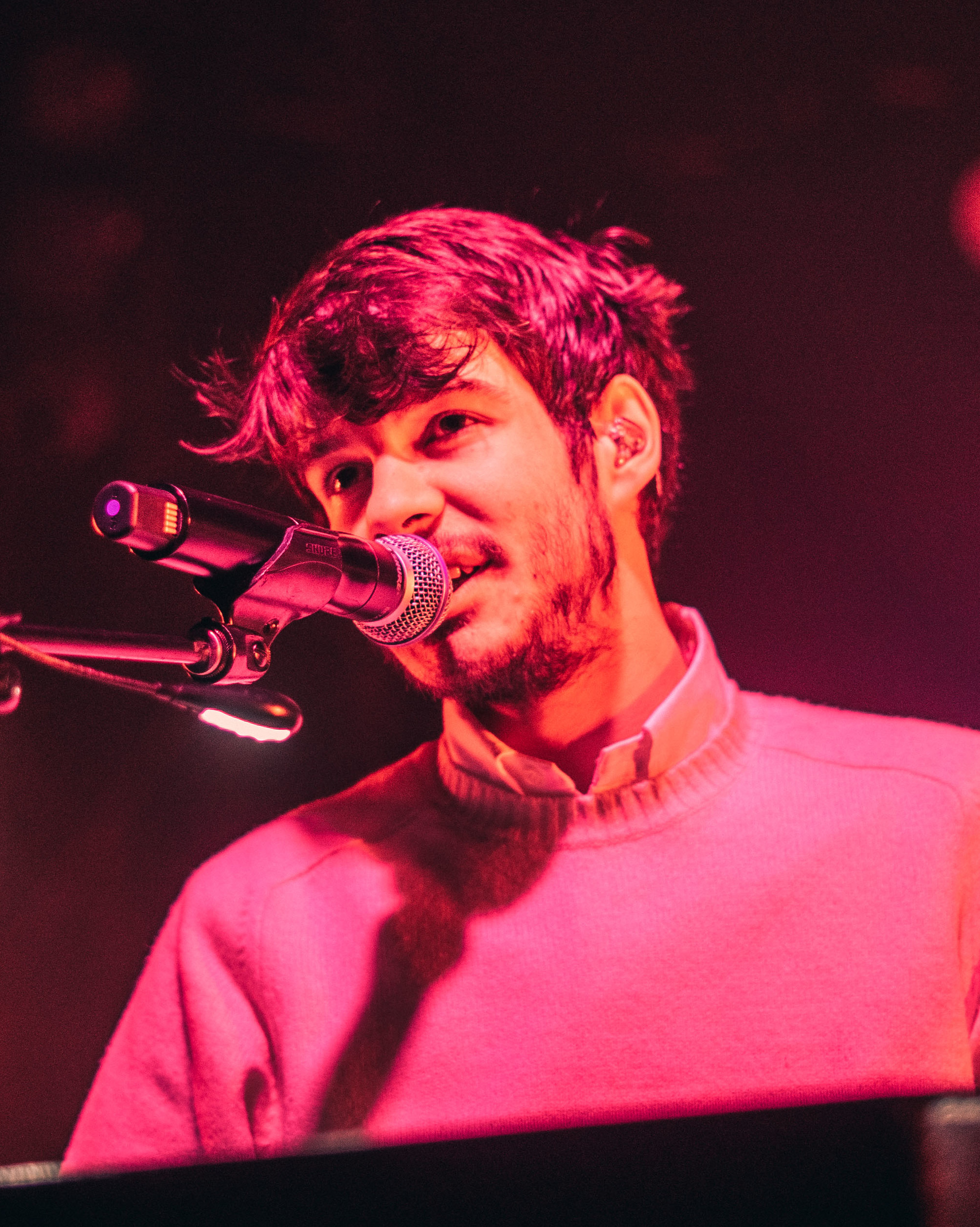
- O'Connor in January 2020

Background information
- Born: Alexander James O'Connor; 4 May 1998 (age 28)
- Origin: Grayshott, England
- Genres: Jazz; hip-hop; bedroom pop; indie rock; lo-fi; soft rock
- Instruments: Vocals; guitar; keyboards; piano; drums; percussion; bass guitar; programming
- Years active: 2014–present
- Label: RCA
- Website: rexorangecounty.com

Alexander James O'Connor (born 4 May 1998), known professionally as Rex Orange County, is a British singer, songwriter and multi-instrumentalist from Grayshott, England. NPR Music's Zoë Jones has described O'Connor's music as "a bright blend of hip-hop, jazz, and bedroom pop".

Teaching himself how to produce his own music at the age of 16, he released his debut album, Bcos U Will Never B Free (2015), on Bandcamp and SoundCloud. O'Connor then released numerous solo singles throughout 2016 and 2017, including the Platinum-certified singles, "Sunflower" and "Best Friend", and then released his second album, Apricot Princess (2017). Tyler, the Creator collaborated with O'Connor on two songs from Tyler's fourth album, Flower Boy (2017), which caused O'Connor to rise in prominence, allowing him to sign with RCA Records.

O'Connor released his third album, Pony (2019), lyrically exploring more personal topics and experimenting with different genres. The album became his first to enter the Billboard 200 in the United States, peaking at number 3 on the chart. His fourth studio album, Who Cares? (2022), topped the UK Albums Chart and peaked at number 5 on the Billboard 200. He released his fifth album, The Alexander Technique, in late 2024, and his sixth album, Dream Fatigue, in late 2026.

== Early life ==
Alexander James O'Connor was born on 4 May 1998, to Nina and Phil O'Connor, a professional sports photographer. He grew up in the village of Grayshott near Haslemere. O'Connor's interest in music began at a young age. At age 5, he joined the choir at the school where his mother had worked. He became a drummer and later taught himself piano. He attended the BRIT School. While there, he came up with the name Rex Orange County, which was based on a teacher-given nickname, "The OC", after his surname O'Connor.

== Career ==
=== 2014–2016: Early career and Bcos U Will Never B Free ===
At age 16, O'Connor began playing the guitar and started to produce his own music using Apple's Logic software. At this age, he also began attending the BRIT School where he studied drumming and was one of four percussionists in his year; the relative rareness of his primary instrument provided him with wide exposure to various projects of others in his school which he credits with exposing him to new music.

O'Connor released his debut single, "Corduroy Dreams", as the lead single from his debut studio album, Bcos U Will Never B Free, on 18 May 2015. On 4 September 2015, Bcos U Will Never B Free was self-released by O'Connor free of charge on Bandcamp and SoundCloud. Upon listening to the album, fellow musician and producer Two Inch Punch contacted him, providing him with a management team. The two would later collaborate on O'Connor's singles, including the single "Uno", released on 17 November 2016. Clash described "Uno", writing: "The buoyant keyboard riff underpins a hypnotic half-spoken vocal, one that veers from topic to topic in a hazy burst of creative mania."

=== 2017–2018: Rise to prominence and Apricot Princess ===
Bcos U Will Never B Free caught the attention of the American rapper Tyler, the Creator, who sent him an email describing his enjoyment of the project. This led to Tyler flying O'Connor out the following year to Los Angeles to collaborate on his album Flower Boy, O'Connor co-writing and contributing vocals to the songs "Boredom" and "Foreword". On 25 January 2017, he released the single "Best Friend" (premiering on Apple Music's Beats 1 station), followed later in the year by the release of his second studio album Apricot Princess. His work was compared by Aimee Cliff of The Fader in 2017 to "other artsy, post-genre teen artists, such as Kevin Abstract or Steve Lacy".

O'Connor's first release following the success of Apricot Princess and Flower Boy was on 11 October 2017 with the single "Loving Is Easy", created in collaboration with the Dutch artist Benny Sings. On 16 April 2018, he performed the song in his television debut on The Tonight Show Starring Jimmy Fallon. On 31 May 2018, he released a cover of "You've Got a Friend in Me" in collaboration with Randy Newman, the creator of the song. He was also featured in Spotify's Rise Program.

On 9 October 2018, O'Connor was scheduled to appear on the French television programme Quotidien, but refused to perform because it featured a sketch by comedian Alison Wheeler parodying the Ku Klux Klan, which he called "tasteless".

=== 2019–2023: Pony and Who Cares? ===
On 14 February 2019, O'Connor released the single "New House". Later that year on 12 September, he released "10/10"; the lead single from his third album Pony. Released on 25 October 2019, Pony was his first major-label album release through RCA Records. Review aggregator Metacritic gave the album a rating of 76/100 based on 11 professional reviews.

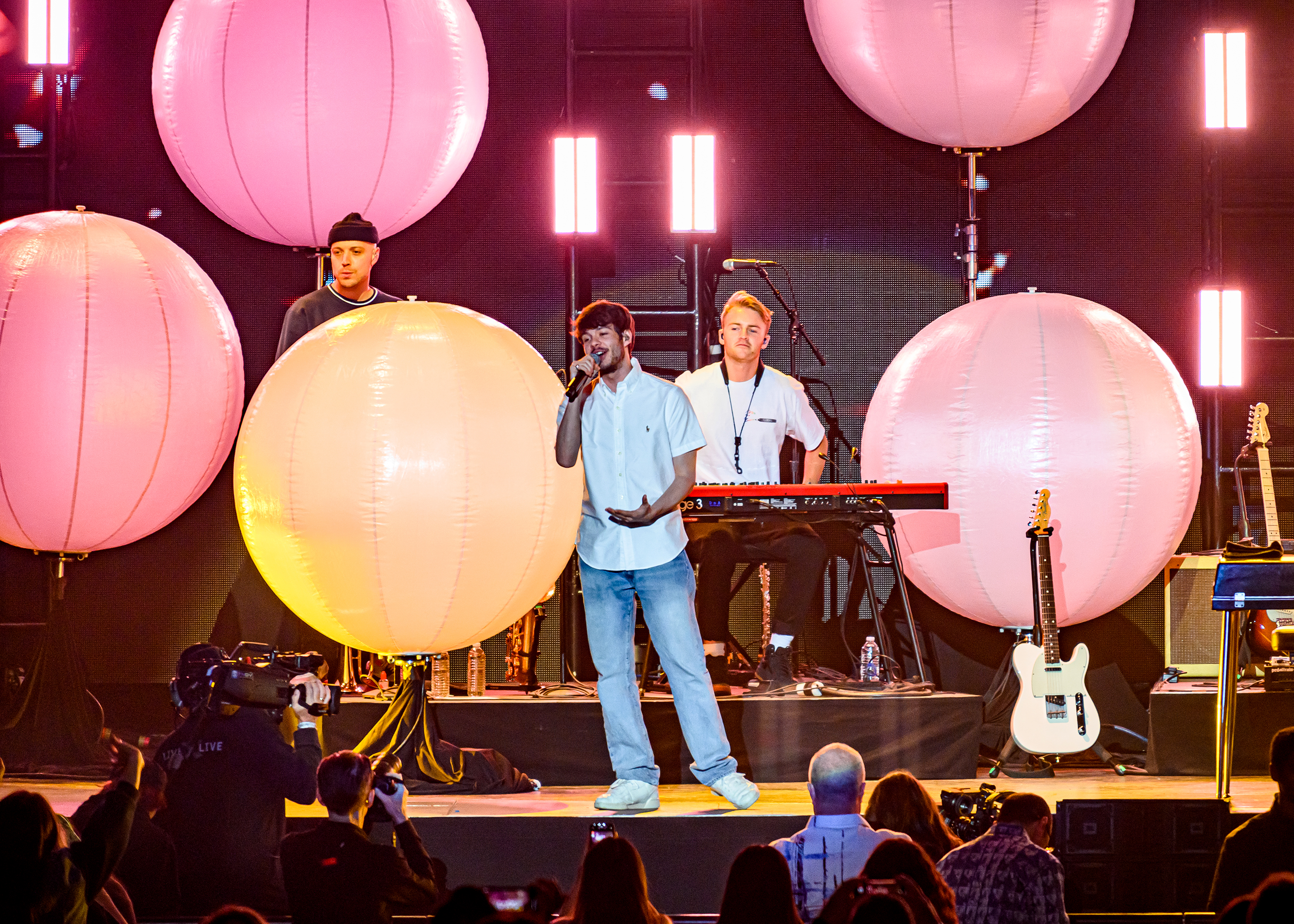
O’Connor performing at his Pony tour in January 2020

On 30 September 2020, O'Connor released an EP with recordings from his performance at Radio City Music Hall in New York City during his Pony tour titled Live at Radio City Music Hall alongside a documentary released on YouTube. This documentary showed the events leading up to this performance as well as the early conclusion of the Pony tour due to the COVID-19 pandemic. In October 2020, O'Connor confirmed that he was in the process of recording a fourth studio album titled Who Cares?. In January 2021, he liked a tweet seemingly confirming that it would be released at some point later that year. However, this did not materialise. On 13 January 2022, he began officially teasing the album, sending out postcards containing a phone number that when called, a snippet of a song would play. The album was released on 11 March 2022, and was his first to top the UK Albums Chart, entering ahead of Impera by Ghost.

In July 2022, O'Connor cancelled tour dates in Australia, New Zealand and Europe due to "unforeseen personal circumstances". He then released a stand-alone single, titled "Threat", on 10 August 2022. In late 2023, O'Connor toured in countries throughout Australia and Asia. He then performed at the 2023 Camp Flog Gnaw festival.

=== 2024–2025: The Alexander Technique ===
On 9 July 2024, O'Connor announced his fifth studio album, The Alexander Technique, after first teasing it one week prior on X. On 18 July 2024, O'Connor released two songs, "Alexander" and "Guitar Song" and shared the 16-song tracklist for the album, which was released on 6 September. During the build-up to the album, O'Connor released two other singles separately. He released "The Table" on 6 August 2024 and "2008" on 4 September 2024, just days before the album's full release. The track "Look Me In The Eyes" marked his first official collaboration with James Blake.

Alongside the release of the album, O'Connor released an exclusive vinyl record edition of "The Alexander Technique" dubbed the "Exclusive Tiger Eye Orange Vinyl". This version of the record contained an exclusive track named "Drama".

On 8 October 2024, Rex Orange County released a remix of "Love Me Not" by Ravyn Lenae. On 22 December 2024, Rex Orange County released the exclusive record track from his fifth album, "Drama" to streaming services, acting as a Christmas gift to his fans. The following year, on Valentines Day, Rex Orange County released a collaborative project with Daniel Caesar featuring two songs, "Rearrange My World" and "There's a Field (That's Only Yours)". The same year on 9 September 2025, he released "Take A Drive" which was collaboratively produced with Pharrell Williams.

=== 2026–present: Dream Fatigue ===
On 28 July 2026, Rex Orange County began his private "House Tour", in which he would travel and visit fans of his and perform small, intimate sets in their houses. In these sets, he began teasing future songs for his sixth album. This included "Indecision", "Boyfriend" and "Grandma Song". "Grandma Song" is a song that he had previously been teasing on his private Instagram account, @lennyemeralds. Further into the tour, he began to tease more unreleased songs online and at other shows. This included a song named "Hannah Montana" and another named "Elvis", which features the lead singer of the band Turnstile, Brendan Yates. He also covered "Linger" by The Cranberries.

On 18 August 2026, Rex Orange County took to social media to announce that the song "Indecision" featuring Daniel Caesar would be released the next day. Caesar originally wrote this song around 2020 for an album of his own. However, it leaked online and he gave it to O'Connor.

On 22 August 2026, O'Connor headlined a festival for the first time in his career, headlining LaLaLa Fest in Jakarta, Indonesia. On 28 August 2026, he performed at Victoria Park in London, as part of the lineup for All Points East. The following day, Tyler, the Creator brought Rex Orange County out as part of his show to perform their song "Boredom" together.

On 23 September 2026, O'Connor released "Grandma Song" and revealed it to be the second single to his upcoming album Dream Fatigue, which was released on 6 November 2026. The third single for the album, "Hannah Montana", which was initially teased through his House Tour performances and Instagram videos, was released on 14 October 2026, alongside a music video of O'Connor riding a horse. He took to his private Instagram account, Lenny Emeralds, to comment on the music video, stating that it was his first time riding a horse and it went surprising well despite his lack of experience.

== Artistry ==
Growing up, O'Connor listened to Queen, ABBA, Stevie Wonder, and American alternative artists like Weezer and Green Day. He cites these artists and others as core inspiration for his own music.

On his song '2008' from the Alexander Technique he mentions Nas' Illmatic, The Black Album by Jay-Z, Paper Trail by T.I., Tha Carter III by Lil Wayne and 808s & Heartbreak by Kanye West as rap he listened to and was inspired by to begin his musical career.

== Personal life ==
In 2015, O'Connor began dating fellow British singer-songwriter Thea Morgan-Murrell (known professionally as Thea), having met while attending the BRIT School together. He sang about her in several of his songs, and they collaborated on the tracks "Sycamore Girl" and "Never Had the Balls". On 24 November 2020, he confirmed on Twitter that they were separated, tweeting "i am not in a relationship".

On 10 October 2022, O'Connor appeared in Southwark Crown Court and was charged with six counts of sexual assault of the same woman, alleged to have taken place in June 2022. He pleaded not guilty to all counts and was bailed, with a trial provisionally scheduled for 3 January 2023. A representative for O'Connor released a statement on his behalf which read: "Alex is shocked by the allegations, which he denies, and looks forward to clearing his name in court. He is unable to make any further comment because of the ongoing proceedings". On 22 December 2022, O'Connor released a statement saying all charges against him were dropped and the case was to be dismissed following an investigation by the Crown Prosecution Service. O'Connor claimed in his statement that CCTV footage and a police interview with the complainant's partner — who was with her on the night in question — did not match her account, meaning the case did not meet the CPS's legal test for a prosecution.

At some point during September 2025, O'Connor adopted Peach, a Maltipoo dog.

== Accolades ==
In January 2018, O'Connor came in second in the BBC Sound of 2018 award after Norwegian singer Sigrid.

== Discography ==
=== Studio albums ===
- Bcos U Will Never B Free (2015)
- Apricot Princess (2017)
- Pony (2019)
- Who Cares? (2022)
- The Alexander Technique (2024)
- Dream Fatigue (2026)
