= Splendour in the Grass 2019 =

Edition of annual Australian music festival

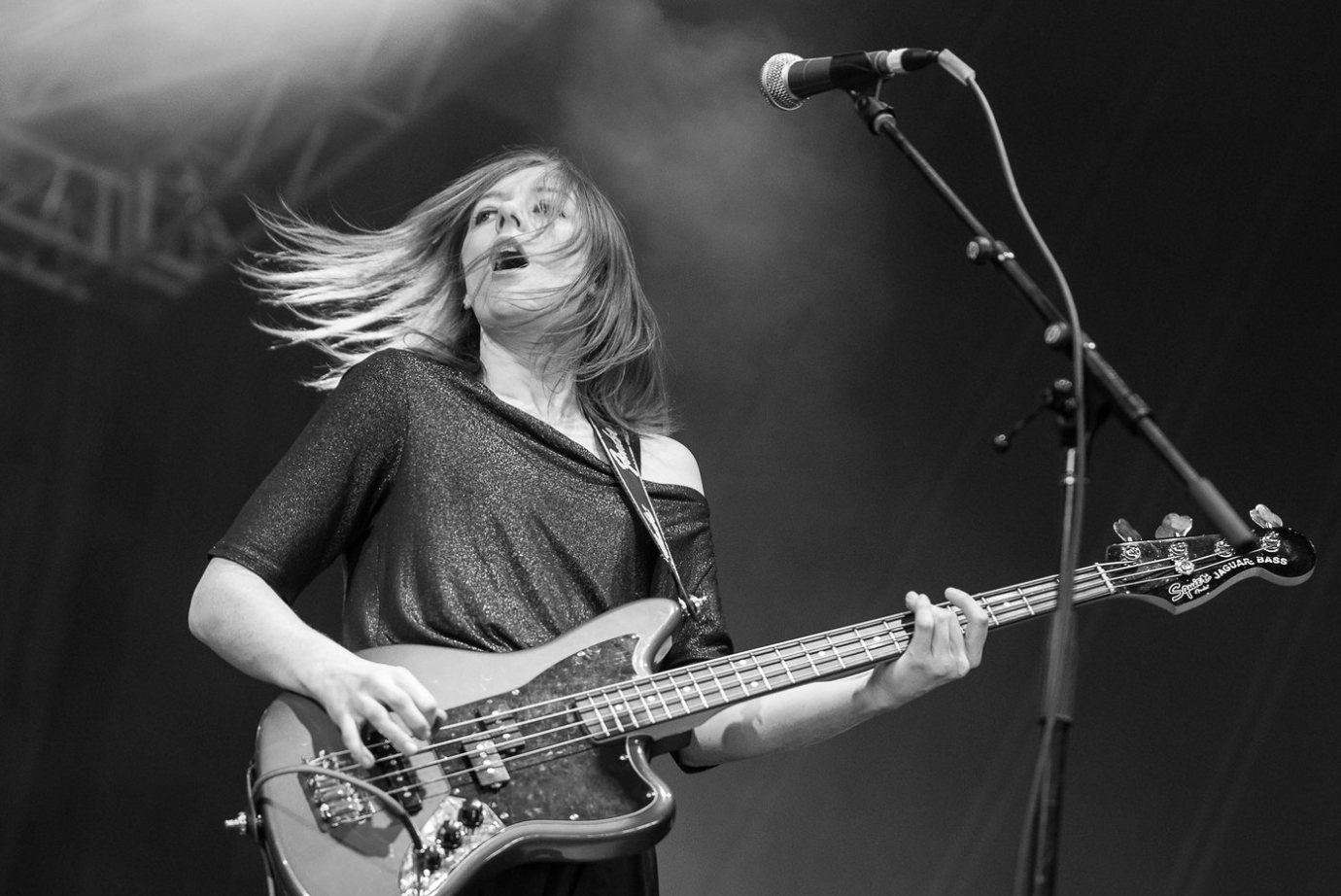
Hayley Manwaring of Moaning Lisa performing at Splendour In The Grass in Byron Bay in 2019

Splendour in the Grass 2019 was the nineteenth edition of the annual Australian music festival Splendour in the Grass. It was held on 19 to 21 July, 2019 at North Byron Parklands, Byron Bay, New South Wales, Australia. The festival was headlined by Australian psychedelic rock band Tame Impala, American musician Childish Gambino and Australian hip hop group Hilltop Hoods.

== Line-up ==
Headline performers are listed in Boldface. Artists listed from latest to earliest set times.

=== Amphitheatre ===
Friday	Saturday	Sunday
**Tame Impala**; Foals; Santigold; Hayden James; Fidlar; Wolfmother; Slaves; A. Swayze & the Ghosts; Tones and I	**Childish Gambino**; Catfish and the Bottlemen; Ocean Alley; Wolf Alice; Dean Lewis; Pond; Trophy Eyes; Dear Seattle; Fergus James	**Hilltop Hoods**; SZA; James Blake; Matt Corby; The Rubens; Last Dinosaurs; The Beths; Slowly Slowly; Pist Idiots

Amphitheater set lists
Childish Gambino
1. "Atavista"
2. "Algorythm"
3. "Summertime Magic"
4. "I. The Worst Guys"
5. "II. Worldstar"
6. "Boogieman"
7. "Have Some Love"
8. "Riot"
9. "Human Sacrifice"
10. "Feels Like Summer"
11. "This Is America"
12. "Sober"
13. "V. 3005"
14. "IV. Sweatpants"
15. "Redbone"
Tame Impala
1. "Let It Happen"
2. "Patience"
3. "The Moment"
4. "Mind Mischief"
5. "Nangs"
6. "Elephant"
7. "Feels Like We Only Go Backwards"
8. "Why Won't You Make Up Your Mind?"
9. "Eventually"
10. "Borderline"
11. "Apocalypse Dreams"

Encore

12. "The Less I Know the Better"
13. "New Person, Same Old Mistakes"
Foals
1. "On the Luna"
2. "Mountain at My Gates"
3. "In Degrees"
4. "Exits"
5. "My Number"
6. "Providence"
7. "Spanish Sahara"
8. "Inhaler"
9. "What Went Down"
10. "Two Steps, Twice"
Catfish and the Bottlemen
1. "Longshot"
2. "Kathleen"
3. "Soundcheck"
4. "Pacifier"
5. "Twice"
6. "Conversation"
7. "2all"
8. "Fluctuate"
9. "7"
10. "Cocoon"
11. "Tyrants"
James Blake
1. "Assume Form"
2. "Life Round Here"
3. "Timeless"
4. "Mile High"
5. "Where's the Catch?"
6. "Voyeur"
7. "Limit to Your Love"
8. "Barefoot in the Park"
9. "Retrograde"
10. "Don't Miss It"
11. "The Wilhelm Scream"
Matt Corby
1. "No Ordinary Life"
2. "New Day Coming"
3. "Sooth Lady Wine"
4. "Brother"
5. "Chains" (Tina Arena cover)
6. "Better"
7. "Elements"
8. "Resolution"
9. "Souls A'Fire"
10. "Miracle Love" (with Broods, Meg Mac, Jarryd James, and Joyride)
Wolf Alice
1. "Moaning Lisa Smile"
2. "You're a Germ"
3. "Bros"
4. "90 Mile Beach"
5. "Don't Delete the Kisses"
6. "Planet Hunter"
7. "Beautifully Unconventional"
8. "Formidable Cool"
9. "Silk"
10. "Space & Time"
11. "Visions of a Life"
12. "Fluffy"
13. "Yuk Foo"
14. "Giant Peach"
Dean Lewis
1. "Hold of Me"
2. "Need You Now"
3. "A Place We Knew"
4. "Stay Awake"
5. "Chemicals"
6. "Lose My Mind"
7. "7 Minutes"
8. "Let Go"
9. "Be Alright"
10. "When You Were Young" (The Killers cover)
11. "Waves"
Pond
1. "30,000 Megatrons"
2. "Sweep Me off My Feet"
3. "Don't Look at the Sun or You'll Go Blind"
4. "Burnt Out Star"
5. "Ray of Light" (Madonna cover)
6. "Jive Talkin'" (Bee Gees cover) / "Paint Me Silver"
7. "Giant Tortoise" / "Eye Pattern Blindness"
8. "Daisy"
9. "The Weather"
Hayden James
1. "Something About You"
2. "Better Together" (with Running Touch)
3. "Favours" (with Nat Dunn)
4. "Just a Lover"
5. "Nowhere to Go" (with Naations and Brisbane City Gospel Choir)
6. "Harder, Better, Faster, Stronger" (Daft Punk cover)
7. "Weightless"
8. "Ocean Drive" (Duke Dumont cover)
9. "Between Us" (with Panama)
10. "Numb" (with Graace)
11. "Just Friends" (with Roméo)
Dear Seattle
1. "Daytime TV"
2. "Let Me Bleed"
3. "The Meadows"
4. "Maybe"
5. "The Special Two" (Missy Higgins cover)
6. "Homegrown"
7. "Try"
8. "I Keep Dreaming"
Wolfmother
1. "Dimension"
2. "White Unicorn"
3. "New Moon Rising"
4. "Woman"
5. "Vagabond"
6. "Colossal"
7. "Apple Tree"
8. "Joker & the Thief"
Tones and I
1. "Johnny Run Away"
2. "Dance Monkey"
3. "Never Seen the Rain"

=== Mix Up ===
Friday	Saturday	Sunday
Russ; Broods; Winston Surfshirt; Dave; K.Flay; Kaiit; The Midnight; Lastlings	The Streets; Friendly Fires; Allday & Friends; Maribou State; Little Simz; Kwame; Channel Tres; Thandi Phoenix	What So Not; Cosmo's Midnight; Tycho; Mansionair; Set Mo; Honne; Kian; Spacey Jane

House DJs performing between acts:

Friday: Merph, Body Promise, DJ Klasik

Saturday: Casual Connection, Donald's House, Dameeeela

Sunday: Ninajirachi, Close Counters, Lex Deluxe

=== McLennan ===
Friday	Saturday	Sunday
Warpaint; Meg Mac; Dermot Kennedy; Odette; Thelma Plum; Sam Fender; Hatchie; Tyne-James Organ	Courtney Barnett; Dope Lemon; Jacob Banks; Tropical Fuck Storm; Ruby Fields; Pub Choir; The Nude Party; Moaning Lisa	The Lumineers; Ziggy Alberts; The Teskey Brothers; Local Natives; Psychedelic Porn Crumpets; Charly Bliss; Phony Ppl; Erthlings

=== Tiny Dancer Stage ===
Friday	Saturday	Sunday
Seb Wildblood; Nathan Micay; Andy Garvey; Jennifer Loveless; Skin on Skin; Rebel Yell	Harvey Sutherland; Kenji Takimi; Suzanne Kraft; Merve; Noise In My Head	Mike Servito; Kyle Hall; DJ JNETT; Telephones; Wax'o Paradiso

=== Red Bull Presents A Night With ===
Thursday
- Pond
- Mystics
- Genesis Owusu
- Electric Fields
- JessB
- Milan Ring

== Cancelled performers ==
- Chance the Rapper, due to illness, replaced by Hilltop Hoods.
- MorMor, due to unknown reason, replaced by Spacey Jane.
