= Triple J's Hottest 100 of 2018 =

Edition of annual Australian music poll

2018 Triple J Hottest 100

Countdown details
- Date of countdown: 27 January 2019
- Charity partner: Lifeline
- Votes cast: 2,758,584

Countdown highlights
- Winning song: Ocean Alley "Confidence"
- Most entries: Ocean Alley (4 tracks)

Chronology
← Previous; 2017	Next → 2019

The 2018 Triple J Hottest 100 was announced on 27 January 2019. It is the 26th countdown of the most popular songs of the year, as chosen by listeners of Australian radio station Triple J. A record-breaking number of voters (2.758 million) participated by choosing their top ten songs of 2018.

Ocean Alley's "Confidence" was voted into first place. Ocean Alley also achieved four tracks in the countdown and became the second artist to be voted into No. 1 and No. 100 during the same countdown, after Powderfinger in 1999.

== Background ==
The Triple J Hottest 100 allows members of the public to vote online for their top ten songs of the year, which are then used to calculate the year's 100 most popular songs. Any song that was released for the first time between 1 December 2017 and 30 November 2018 is eligible for 2018's Hottest 100. Voting opened on 10 December 2018, as announced by Liam Stapleton in a crime mockumentary. Several artists and presenters, including Billie Eilish, Tash Sultana, Amy Shark and Anderson .Paak, made their votes public. The artists most often voted for by Triple J presenters were The Presets, Kwame, Rüfüs Du Sol, and G Flip.

Once voting closed, Triple J announced on 25 January that a total of 2.758 million votes had been cast, breaking the previous year's record by 14%. The station also announced that 95% of voters were from Australia and 60% were under the age of 25.

=== Projections ===
Prior to the countdown, bookmakers Sportsbet, Beteasy, Ladbrokes, and social media measurement site 100 Warm Tunas, placed "Confidence" by Australian band Ocean Alley and "This Is America" by American rapper Childish Gambino as the two songs most likely to be voted into first place. Ocean Alley's highest previous performance was No. 48 with "The Comedown" in 2017, whilst Gambino's highest previous performance was No. 5 with "Redbone" in 2016.

=== Announcement date ===
On 27 November 2017, Triple J announced plans to move the Hottest 100 from Australia Day (January 26) to the fourth Saturday of January. This followed a campaign led by Indigenous Australian activists and supporters, calling on Triple J to change the date due to opposition to Australia Day's celebratory commemoration of British settlement. Following the announcement, concerns were raised on social media regarding the 2018 Hottest 100 announcement date, as the fourth Saturday of January 2019 coincides with January 26. Station newsreader Avani Dias and content director Ollie Wards stated that the 2019 dates would be reviewed and announced in the future.

On 6 December 2018, Triple J announced that they would hold the countdown on 27 January 2019.

== Full list ==
Note: Australian artists

#	Song	Artist	Country of origin
1	Confidence	Ocean Alley	Australia
2	Losing It	Fisher	Australia
3	Sicko Mode	Travis Scott	United States
4	This Is America	Childish Gambino	United States
5	I Said Hi	Amy Shark	Australia
6	Be Alright	Dean Lewis	Australia
7	Groceries	Mallrat	Australia
8	When the Party's Over	Billie Eilish	United States
9	Dinosaurs	Ruby Fields	Australia
10	Knees	Ocean Alley	Australia
11	Up in the Clouds	Skegss	Australia
12	Turn	The Wombats	United Kingdom
13	Praise the Lord (Da Shine)	ASAP Rocky featuring Skepta	United States/United Kingdom
14	I'm Good	Wafia	Australia
15	Just Friends	Hayden James featuring Boy Matthews	Australia/United Kingdom
16	Baby Come Back (Like a Version)	Ocean Alley	Australia
17	Lovely	Billie Eilish and Khalid	United States
18	Join the Club	Hockey Dad	Australia
19	Peach	Broods	New Zealand
20	Waiting	Kian	Australia
21	Never Ever	The Rubens featuring Sarah	Australia
22	Underwater	Rüfüs Du Sol	Australia
23	Treat You Better	Rüfüs Du Sol	Australia
24	Leave Me Lonely	Hilltop Hoods	Australia
25	I Miss You	Thundamentals	Australia
26	All the Pretty Girls	Vera Blue	Australia
27	Sunflower	Post Malone and Swae Lee	United States
28	All the Stars	Kendrick Lamar and SZA	United States
29	Fire	Peking Duk	Australia
30	Sometimes	Cub Sport	Australia
31	Church	Alison Wonderland	Australia
32	God Forgot	The Rubens	Australia
33	Better Now	Post Malone	United States
34	1950	King Princess	United States
35	Ladders	Mac Miller	United States
36	All Loved Up	Amy Shark	Australia
37	Love Me Now	Ziggy Alberts	Australia
38	About You	G Flip	Australia
39	The Perfect Life Does Not Exist	Ball Park Music	Australia
40	Nice for What	Drake	Canada
41	In the Air	DMA's	Australia
42	Laps Around the Sun	Ziggy Alberts	Australia
43	God's Plan	Drake	Canada
44	Clark Griswold	Hilltop Hoods featuring Adrian Eagle	Australia
45	Mantra	Bring Me the Horizon	United Kingdom
46	You Should See Me in a Crown	Billie Eilish	United States
47	Like People	DZ Deathrays	Australia
48	When I Dream	San Cisco	Australia
49	Missing Me	Angie McMahon	Australia
50	No Place	Rüfüs Du Sol	Australia
51	Mr La Di Da Di	Baker Boy	Australia
52	Better	Khalid	United States
53	We're Going Home	Vance Joy	Australia
54	Saturday Sun	Vance Joy	Australia
55	Wasted	Peking Duk	Australia
56	Without Me	Halsey	United States
57	Martini	The Presets	Australia
58	Soaked	Bene	New Zealand
59	Give Me My Name Back	Meg Mac	Australia
60	The End	DMA's	Australia
61	I Wanna Be Everybody	Hockey Dad	Australia
62	Killing My Time	G Flip	Australia
63	Boogie	Brockhampton	United States
64	Mistake	Middle Kids	Australia
65	Scream Whole	Methyl Ethel	Australia
66	Need You	Flight Facilities featuring Nïka	Australia/New Zealand
67	Tints	Anderson .Paak featuring Kendrick Lamar	United States
68	Eastside	Benny Blanco, Halsey and Khalid	United States
69	Cheetah Tongue	The Wombats	United Kingdom
70	UFO	Mallrat featuring Allday	Australia
71	Smogged Out	Skegss	Australia
72	What Can I Do If the Fire Goes Out? (Like a Version)	Nothing But Thieves	United Kingdom
73	Sweet Release	Hockey Dad	Australia
74	Pussy is God	King Princess	United States
75	Molotov	Kira Puru	Australia
76	Clarity	Polish Club	Australia
77	Miracle	Chvrches	United Kingdom
78	Better Together	Hayden James featuring Running Touch	Australia
79	Clumsy Love	Thelma Plum	Australia
80	Nothing Breaks Like a Heart	Mark Ronson featuring Miley Cyrus	United Kingdom/United States
81	Ballroom	Jack River	Australia
82	Hunger	Florence & the Machine	United Kingdom
83	1999 Wildfire	Brockhampton	United States
84	Cigarettes	Tash Sultana	Australia
85	Bubblin	Anderson .Paak	United States
86	Dirt Cheap	Lime Cordiale	Australia
87	Younger	Ruel	Australia
88	Labrador	Waax	Australia
89	Dazed & Confused	Ruel	Australia
90	Psycho	Post Malone featuring Ty Dolla Sign	United States
91	Sundress	ASAP Rocky	United States
92	Everybody But You	Thundamentals	Australia
93	You Can Count on Me	Trophy Eyes	Australia
94	Ivy (Doomsday)	The Amity Affliction	Australia
95	Four Out of Five	Arctic Monkeys	United Kingdom
96	Take It to the Heart	Odette	Australia
97	Do I Need You Now?	DMA's	Australia
98	Ghost Town	Kanye West featuring PartyNextDoor	United States/Canada
99	Polygraph Eyes	Yungblud	United Kingdom
100	Happy Sad	Ocean Alley	Australia

=== #101–#200 List ===
On 28 January 2019, Triple J announced the songs placed 101–200th in the countdown.

#	Song	Artist	Country of origin
101	Talia	King Princess	United States
102	Wow	Kwame	Australia
103	Tieduprightnow	Parcels	Australia
104	OTW	Khalid, Ty Dolla Sign and 6lack	United States
105	Further Than the Planes Fly	Eves Karydas	Australia
106	Starlight	Safia	Australia
107	Get to Know	Cosmo's Midnight featuring Winston Surfshirt	Australia
108	Self Care	Mac Miller	United States
109	What's the Use?	Mac Miller	United States
110	The End Times	Ball Park Music	Australia
111	Waste of Time	Alex the Astronaut	Australia
112	All Your Love	Flight Facilities featuring Dustin Tebbutt	Australia
113	How to Socialise & Make Friends	Camp Cope	Australia
114	No Ordinary Life	Matt Corby	Australia
115	Nonstop	Drake	Canada
116	Crowd Control	Fisher	Australia
117	For Your Love	Montaigne	Australia
118	Clothes I Slept In	Luca Brasi	Australia
119	Wonderful Life	Bring Me the Horizon featuring Dani Filth	United Kingdom
120	Get Out	Chvrches	United Kingdom
121	Mariners Apartment Complex	Lana Del Rey	United States
122	Stronger	Ziggy Alberts	Australia
123	Graffiti	Chvrches	United Kingdom
124	Ginger	Riton and Kah-Lo	United Kingdom/Nigeria
125	Confess	Jack River	Australia
126	Falling Out	Golden Features	Australia
127	Downtown Shutdown	The Presets	Australia
128	Stupid World	Hermitude featuring Bibi Bourelly	Australia/Germany
129	Miracle Love	Matt Corby	Australia
130	Survival in the City	Client Liaison	Australia
131	Wonder Drug	Allday	Australia
132	Talking Straight	Rolling Blackouts Coastal Fever	Australia
133	Faces	Holy Holy	Australia
134	Happy Song (Shed Mix)	Alex the Astronaut	Australia
135	In My Feelings	Drake	Canada
136	Seoul	RM	South Korea
137	Reel It In	Aminé	United States
138	Salvation	Tash Sultana	Australia
139	Last Night	Graace	Australia
140	New Orleans	Brockhampton	United States
141	Don't You Know I'm in a Band	Confidence Man	Australia
142	Bleach	Brockhampton	United States
143	Black Magic	Baker Boy featuring Dallas Woods	Australia
144	Limo Song	Jack River	Australia
145	3 Nights	Dominic Fike	United Kingdom
146	Worship	Golden Features	Australia
147	Slow Dancing in the Dark	Joji	Japan
148	Summertime Magic	Childish Gambino	United States
149	Fallingwater	Maggie Rogers	United States
150	The Idiot	Amy Shark	Australia
151	Lost in My Mind	Rüfüs Du Sol	Australia
152	I'm with You	Vance Joy	Australia
153	On My Knees	Middle Kids	Australia
154	I Can't Get Last Night Out of My Head	Didirri	Australia
155	Forever & Ever More	Nothing but Thieves	United Kingdom
156	I Wanna Know	RL Grime featuring Daya	United States
157	Can't You See	Fidlar	United States
158	All Mine	Kanye West	United States
159	Nameless, Faceless	Courtney Barnett	Australia
160	After the Storm	Kali Uchis featuring Tyler, the Creator and Bootsy Collins	United States
161	Hereafter	Architects	United Kingdom
162	Light On	Maggie Rogers	United States
163	Smile	Hellions	Australia
164	My Hands	Running Touch	Australia
165	Loyal	Odesza	United States
166	Bones	Ocean Alley	Australia
167	Panic Room	Au/Ra and CamelPhat	Germany/United Kingdom
168	The Void	Parkway Drive	Australia
169	Don't Be Hiding	Middle Kids	Australia
170	Free Mind	Tash Sultana	Australia
171	Friends	E^ST	Australia
172	Strangers	Tia Gostelow featuring Lanks	Australia
173	Stop	Skegss	Australia
174	Prey	Parkway Drive	Australia
175	14U+14Me	The Presets	Australia
176	Yeah Right	Joji	Japan
177	Landmine	I Know Leopard	Australia
178	4Ever	Clairo	United States
179	For the Record	Winston Surfshirt	Australia
180	Fuckin 'N' Rollin	Phantastic Ferniture	Australia
181	Keeping Time	Angie McMahon	Australia
182	I Don't Lack Imagination	E^ST	Australia
183	Ritalin	Ruby Fields	Australia
184	Psycho	Amy Shark featuring Mark Hoppus	Australia/United States
185	Chasing Stars	Alice Ivy featuring Bertie Blackman	Australia
186	ASAP Forever Remix	ASAP Rocky featuring Moby, T.I. and Kid Cudi	United States
187	Bee-Sting	The Wombats	United Kingdom
188	Suffer	Petit Biscuit featuring Skott	France/Sweden
189	Lights Out	Odette	Australia
190	Ten Leaf Clover	Slowly Slowly	Australia
191	Lavender Bones	Stand Atlantic	Australia
192	Baby	Bishop Briggs	United Kingdom
193	Viv in the Front Seat	Ceres	Australia
194	All That I See	Matt Corby	Australia
195	Friday Forever	Trophy Eyes	Australia
196	Reborn	Kids See Ghosts	United States
197	My Own Mess	Skegss	Australia
198	Time & Money	DMA's	Australia
199	Want That	Good Doogs	Australia
200	6am	Joyride	Australia

== Statistics ==
=== Artists with multiple entries ===
#	Artist	Entries
4	Ocean Alley	1, 10, 16, 100
3	Drake (Note: Twice solo (40, 43), once with Travis Scott (3))	3, 40, 43
3	Billie Eilish (Note: Twice solo (8, 46), once with Khalid (17))	8, 17, 46
3	Khalid (Note: Once solo (52), once with Billie Eilish (17), once with Benny Blanco and Halsey (68))	17, 52, 68
3	Hockey Dad	18, 61, 73
3	Rüfüs Du Sol	22, 23, 50
3	Post Malone	27, 33, 90
3	DMA's	41, 60, 97
2	Amy Shark	5, 36
2	Mallrat	7, 70
2	Skegss	11, 71
2	The Wombats	12, 69
2	A$AP Rocky	13, 91
2	Hayden James	15, 78
2	Sarah Aarons (Note: Once with The Rubens (21), once with Peking Duk (29))	21, 29
2	The Rubens	21, 32
2	Hilltop Hoods	24, 44
2	Thundamentals	25, 92
2	Kendrick Lamar (Note: Once with SZA (28), once with Anderson .Paak (67))	28, 67
2	Peking Duk	29, 55
2	King Princess	34, 74
2	Ziggy Alberts	37, 42
2	G Flip	38, 62
2	Vance Joy	53, 54
2	Halsey (Note: Once solo (56), once with Benny Blanco and Khalid (68))	56, 68
2	Brockhampton	63, 83
2	Anderson .Paak	67, 85
2	Ruel	87, 89

=== Countries represented ===
Country	Entries
Australia	65
United States	23
United Kingdom	11
Canada	4
New Zealand	3

=== Records ===
- The song "What Can I Do If the Fire Goes Out?" by Gang of Youths featured in the countdown for the second year in a row after a cover by Nothing but Thieves featured at No. 72.

== 2018 Triple J Album Poll ==
The annual Triple J album poll was held across November and December and was announced on 16 December.

Note: Australian artists

#	Artist	Album	Country of origin	Tracks in the Hottest 100
1	Ball Park Music	Good Mood	Australia	39, (18 in 2017)
2	Ocean Alley	Chiaroscuro	Australia	1, 10, 100, (48 in 2017)
3	Hockey Dad	Blend Inn	Australia	18, 61, 73, (54 in 2017)
4	DMA's	For Now	Australia	41, 60, 97, (89 in 2017)
5	Middle Kids	Lost Friends	Australia	64
6	Skegss	My Own Mess	Australia	11, 71
7	Rüfüs Du Sol	Solace	Australia	22, 23, 50
8	The Wombats	Beautiful People Will Ruin Your Life	United Kingdom	12, 69, (22 in 2017)
9	Jack River	Sugar Mountain	Australia	81, (64 in 2017)
10	Arctic Monkeys	Tranquility Base Hotel & Casino	United Kingdom	95
11	Amy Shark	Love Monster	Australia	5, 36, (2 in 2016)
12	DZ Deathrays	Bloody Lovely	Australia	47, (67 in 2017)
13	Vance Joy	Nation of Two	Australia	53, 54, (9 in 2017)
14	Courtney Barnett	Tell Me How You Really Feel	Australia	DNC (159 in Hottest 200)
15	Matt Corby	Rainbow Valley	Australia	DNC (114, 129, 194 in Hottest 200)
16	Brockhampton	Iridescence	United States	DNC (140 in Hottest 200)
17	Tash Sultana	Flow State	Australia	84, (28, 43 in 2017)
18	Chvrches	Love Is Dead	United Kingdom	77
19	The Presets	Hi Viz	Australia	57, (93 in 2017)
20	Camp Cope	How to Socialise & Make Friends	Australia	(58 in 2017)

== CD Release ==
The twenty-sixth CD compilation for the Triple J Hottest 100 was released on 22 February 2019.

Disc 1
No.	Title	Artist(s)	Length
1.	"Confidence" (#1)	Ocean Alley	4:14
2.	"Losing It" (#2)	Fisher	4:07
3.	"I Said Hi" (#5)	Amy Shark	2:48
4.	"Sicko Mode" (#3)	Travis Scott	5:12
5.	"When the Party's Over" (#8)	Billie Eilish	3:15
6.	"Up in the Clouds" (#11)	Skegss	2:29
7.	"Turn" (#12)	The Wombats	3:26
8.	"This Is America" (#4)	Childish Gambino	3:45
9.	"Be Alright" (#6)	Dean Lewis	3:16
10.	"Groceries" (#7)	Mallrat	3:35
11.	"Just Friends" (#15)	Hayden James featuring Boy Matthews	3:58
12.	"Praise the Lord (Da Shine)" (#13)	A$AP Rocky featuring Skepta	3:25
13.	"Dinosaurs" (#9)	Ruby Fields	3:52
14.	"Join the Club" (#18)	Hockey Dad	3:15
15.	"I'm Good" (#14)	Wafia	3:37
16.	"Waiting" (#20)	Kian	3:35
17.	"Never Ever" (#21)	The Rubens featuring Sarah	3:19
18.	"Underwater" (#22)	Rüfüs Du Sol	5:49
19.	"Peach" (#19)	Broods	4:15
20.	"Leave Me Lonely" (#24)	Hilltop Hoods	3:14
21.	"The Perfect Life Does Not Exist" (#39)	Ball Park Music	3:21
22.	"All the Pretty Girls" (#26)	Vera Blue	3:22

Disc 2
No.	Title	Artist(s)	Length
1.	"All the Stars" (#28)	Kendrick Lamar & SZA	3:53
2.	"Sometimes" (#30)	Cub Sport	2:33
3.	"Love Me Now" (#37)	Ziggy Alberts	4:02
4.	"1950" (#34)	King Princess	3:44
5.	"Better Now" (#33)	Post Malone	3:49
6.	"Fire" (#29)	Peking Duk	3:46
7.	"In the Air" (#41)	DMA's	4:00
8.	"About You" (#38)	G Flip	4:07
9.	"Ladders" (#35)	Mac Miller	4:47
10.	"Mantra" (#45)	Bring Me the Horizon	3:52
11.	"Missing Me" (#49)	Angie McMahon	3:14
12.	"I Miss You" (#25)	Thundamentals	3:24
13.	"Church" (#31)	Alison Wonderland	3:03
14.	"Like People" (#47)	DZ Deathrays	3:42
15.	"When I Dream" (#48)	San Cisco	3:10
16.	"Soaked" (#58)	Bene	4:00
17.	"Mr La Di Da Di" (#51)	Baker Boy	3:20
18.	"We're Going Home" (#53)	Vance Joy	3:26
19.	"Better" (#52)	Khalid	3:47
20.	"Martini" (#57)	The Presets	4:00
21.	"Give Me My Name Back" (#59)	Meg Mac	3:11
22.	"Boogie" (#63)	Brockhampton	3:13
