= Foolproof (Hayden James, Gorgon City and Nat Dunn song) =

Single by Hayden James, Gorgon City and Nat Dunn

from the album Olympia
- Released: 19 March 2021
- Length: 4:27
- Label: Future Classic
- Songwriters: Hayden Luby; Kye Gibbon; Matthew Robson-Scott; Natalie Dunn
- Producers: Hayden James; Gorgon City

Hayden James singles chronology
"Waves of Gold" (2020)	"Foolproof" (2021)

Gorgon City singles chronology
"You've Done Enough" (2021)	"Foolproof" (2021)	"Tell Me It's True" (2021)

Nat Dunn singles chronology
"Favours" (2019)	"Foolproof" (2021)	"The Last Time" (2023)

"Foolproof" is a song by Australian singer and music producer Hayden James, English production duo Gorgon City and Australian singer Nat Dunn. It was released on 19 March 2021.

The official visualiser was released on 19 March 2021.

At the 2022 Queensland Music Awards, the release won Electronic / Dance Award and Regional / Remote Award.

== Critical reception ==
Alex Gallagher from NME said "The anthemic house cut is anchored by Dunn's soaring vocals, which float above hypnotic beats and deep bass." Brian Bonavoglia from DJ Times called the song "a sultry dancefloor filler with pop sensibilities" and "an infectious house hit ready to rock club systems or dominate the radio airwaves."

== Track listing ==
Digital download

1. "Foolproof" – 4:27

Digital download

1. "Foolproof" (LP Giobbi remix) - 3:17
2. "Foolproof" – 4:27

== Charts ==
=== Weekly charts ===
Weekly chart performance for "Foolproof"
Chart (2021–2022)	Peak position
Australian Independent Singles (AIR)	7
Hungary (Dance Top 40)	10
Hungary (Rádiós Top 40)	2
Hungary (Single Top 40)	2
New Zealand Hot Singles (RMNZ)	33

=== Year-end charts ===
2021 year-end chart performance for "Foolproof"
Chart (2021)	Position
Hungary (Rádiós Top 40)	54
Hungary (Single Top 40)	8

2022 year-end chart performance for "Foolproof"
Chart (2022)	Position
Hungary (Dance Top 40)	41
Hungary (Rádiós Top 40)	2
Hungary (Single Top 40)	12

2023 year-end chart performance for "Foolproof"
Chart (2023)	Position
Hungary (Dance Top 40)	62
Hungary (Rádiós Top 40)	9

2024 year-end chart performance for "Foolproof"
Chart (2024)	Position
Hungary (Rádiós Top 40)	48

2025 year-end chart performance for "Foolproof"
Chart (2025)	Position
Hungary (Rádiós Top 40)	67
