= Oddworld (album) =

Studio album by Ocean Grove
- Released: 22 November 2024
- Recorded: 2017–2024
- Genre: Nu metal; hardcore punk; rap metal
- Length: 25:10
- Label: SharpTone
- Producer: Sam Bassal

Ocean Grove chronology
Up in the Air Forever (2022)	Oddworld (2024)

Singles from Oddworld
- 1. "Fly Away" Released: 30 May 2024; 2. "My Disaster" Released: 25 July 2024; 3. "Raindrop" Released: 28 August 2024; 4. "Last Dance" Released: 10 October 2024

Oddworld ratings
Review scores
Source	Rating
Kerrang!	3/5
Metal Epidemic	3/5
Spotlight Report	4/5
Wall of Sound	7.5/10

Oddworld is the fourth studio album by Australian nu metal band Ocean Grove. Produced by group member Sam Bassal, it was released on 22 November 2024 through SharpTone Records.

At the AIR Awards of 2025, the album was nominated for Best Independent Heavy Album or EP.

== Background ==
Producer Sam Bassal has stated that several aspects of the album were inspired by major 2000s artists such as N.E.R.D. and Justin Timberlake.

== Track listing ==
Note: All track titles are stylised in all caps.

Oddworld track listing
No.	Title	Writer(s)	Length
1.	"OG Forever"	Matthew Kopp	0:51
2.	"Cell Division"	Sam Bassal; Luke Holmes; Brent Hunter; Dale Tanner	2:50
3.	"Fly Away"	Bassal; Holmes; Hunter; Tanner	2:41
4.	"Stunner"	Bassal; Holmes; Hunter; Kopp; Tanner	3:14
5.	"Raindrop"	Bassal; Holmes; Hunter	2:50
6.	"No Offence Detected"	Bassal; Hunter	0:49
7.	"My Disaster"	Bassal; Holmes; Hunter; Tanner	2:41
8.	"Last Dance"	Bassal; Holmes; Hunter; Tanner	3:33
9.	"SoWhat1999"	Bassal; Holmes; Hunter	3:00
10.	"OTP" (featuring New Babylon and Adult Art Club)	Bassal; Holmes; Zachari Waters	2:37
Total length:			25:10

== Personnel ==
- Luke Holmes – lead vocals
- Dale Tanner – lead vocals
- Twiggy Hunter – bass, vocals
- Sam Bassal – drums, guitar, production, engineered, mastering, mixing
- Matthew Kopp (aka Running Touch) – samples, keyboards, vocals, production, engineered, mastering, mixing

== Charts ==
Chart performance for Oddworld
Chart (2024)	Peak position
Australian Albums (ARIA)	8
