= We Could Be Love =

Studio album by Hayden James
- Released: 13 September 2024
- Genre: House
- Length: 32:54
- Label: Future Classic
- Producer: Jonathan Clare; Tom Demac; Theo Duke; Hyzteria; Hayden James; JKP; Kormak; Theo Meenderink; Ross Quinn; Max Styler; James Tadgell; Tancrede; Tudor; Twin Lee

Hayden James chronology
Lifted (2022)	We Could Be Love (2024)

Singles from We Could Be Love
- 1. "We Could Be Love" Released: 1 September 2023; 2. "Make It" Released: 26 April 2024; 3. "Deep Diving" Released: 21 June 2024; 4. "Patience" Released: 26 July 2024; 5. "All In" Released: 16 August 2024

We Could Be Love is the third studio album by Australian songwriter and record producer Hayden James. The album was announced in June 2024, alongside the single "Deep Diving" and released on 13 September 2024.

== Reception ==
Professional ratings
Review scores
Source	Rating
Rolling Stone Australia	3/5 stars

James Jennings from Rolling Stone Australia said "Hayden James sticks to a reliable formula on We Could Be Love" adding "[it's] dance music designed to wash over you rather than demand you hit the dancefloor."

This Song Is Sick wrote that "We Could Be Love sees Hayden James put on a masterclass of his own interpretation of house music and it makes for one hell of an album."

== Track listing ==
We Could Be Love track listing
No.	Title	Writer(s)	Producer(s)	Length
1.	"Patience" (with Karen Harding)	Hayden James; Koray Altiparmak; Karen Harding	James; Tom Demac; Kormak; Twin Lee	2:51
2.	"Deep Diving" (with Shells)	James; Altiparmak; Tinashe Fazakerley; Alexander Hauer; Sarah Sheldrake	James; Demac; Kormak	2:14
3.	"We Could Be Love" (with AR/CO)	James; Mali-Koa Hood; Leo Stannard	James; Max Styler	3:09
4.	"All In"	James; Kareen Lomax; Gez O'Connell; Nicholas Routledge	James; Demac; Kormak	2:24
5.	"Medicine" (with Izzy Bizu)	James	James; Theo Duke; Demac; Tancrede	2:50
6.	"The Pleasure"	James; Altiparmak; Miron Jacob Binder; Alisa Xayalith	James; Demac; Kormak	2:27
7.	"Don't Let Me Go" (with Tudor)	James; Altiparmak; Tudor Davies; John Kilpatrick	James; Demac; Kilpatrick; Kormak	3:14
8.	"Shelter" (with Lilly Ahlberg)	James; Lilly Ahlberg	James; Jonathan James Clare; Demac; Kormak; Matthias Meenderink; James Tadgell	3:50
9.	"Waves Out" (with Ross Quinn)	James; Camden Cox; Davies; Quinn	James; Demac; Kormak	3:34
10.	"Imagine" (with Hyzteria)	James; Altiparmak; Julia Church; Timothee Kulawik; Christian O'Mahony	James; Demac; Hyzteria; Kormak	3:38
11.	"Make It" (with Kormak)	James; Altiparmak	James; Kormak	2:38
Total length:				32:54

== Personnel ==
- Matthew Styles – mastering
- Tom Demac – mixing (tracks 1, 2, 4–11)
- Eric J Dubowsky – mixing (track 3)

== Charts ==
We Could Be Love did not enter the ARIA top 100, but peaked at number 3 on the Australian Artist Dance chart.

Chart performance for We Could Be Love
Chart (2024)	Peak position
Australian Artist Dance Albums (ARIA)	3
