= Flip Phone Fantasy =

Studio album by Ocean Grove
- Released: 13 March 2020
- Recorded: 2018–2019
- Genre: Nu metal; rap metal
- Length: 37:01
- Label: UNFD
- Producer: Sam Bassal

Ocean Grove chronology
The Rhapsody Tapes (2017)	Flip Phone Fantasy (2020)	Up in the Air Forever (2022)

Singles from Flip Phone Fantasy
- 1. "Ask for the Anthem" Released: 6 February 2019; 2. "Junkie$" Released: 28 October 2019; 3. "Sunny" Released: 12 December 2019; 4. "NEO" Released: 11 February 2020; 5. "Thousand Golden People" Released: 27 February 2020

Flip Phone Fantasy is the second studio album by Australian nu metal band Ocean Grove. it was released on 13 March 2020 through UNFD Records. Their first single "Ask for the Anthem" was released on 6 February 2019. The second single "JUNKIE$" was released on 28 October 2019. The third single "Sunny" was released on 12 December 2019, while the music video for the single was released on 20 January 2020. The fourth single "NEO" was released on 11 February 2020. The fifth single "Thousand Golden People" was released on 27 February 2020 along with the announcement of the album's release date. It is the first album to not feature Luke Holmes on vocals and Jimmy Hall on guitar, and the first album to feature Twiggy Hunter on bass and vocals with Dale Tanner switching to lead vocals; this can be heard on the album in a shift away from their previous hardcore punk influenced releases, as Flip Phone Fantasy takes more influence from rap metal and alternative rock, featuring far less screaming than their previous work.

== Critical reception ==
Professional ratings
Review scores
Source	Rating
Depth	10/10
Hysteria	10/10
The Music	4/4 stars
The Soundboard Reviews	7/10 stars
Wall Of Sound	9/10

Flip Phone Fantasy received critical acclaim upon release. Kel Burch of Depth Mag was overwhelmingly positive about the album, giving it a perfect score of 10 and stating "Whether it’s in the fire of 'Neo', the dark trancey world of 'Guys from the Gord', the whispered intoxication of 'Baby Cobra', the heartfelt balladry of 'Freaks', or the bouncy singalongs of 'Ask for the Anthem', Flip Phone Fantasy brilliantly expresses the heart and soul of Ocean Grove. The band embody the importance of individuality and to look to the heart instead of assume a prescribed or expected image. Flip Phone Fantasy is a fitting tribute to that, and a breathtaking adventure to be with." Tom Valcanis of Hysteria Magazine also gave album a perfect score of 10 and stating "Ocean Grove starved for this album, they bled for this album. Flip Phone Fantasy is that union of imagination, time, and sound manifest. Go decorate some well earned moments with it. You’ll be glad you did."

== Track listing ==
Note: All track titles are stylised in all caps.

Flip Phone Fantasy track listing
No.	Title	Writer(s)	Length
1.	"Superstar"	Sam Bassal; Luke Holmes; Dale Tanner; Twiggy Hunter	3:05
2.	"Neo"	Bassal; Hunter; Matt Henley; Nicholas Jones	1:53
3.	"Sense Again"	Bassal; Tanner; Hunter	3:03
4.	"Sunny"	Bassal; Tanner; Hunter	3:00
5.	"Thousand Golden People"	Bassal; Hunter; Tanner; Matthew Kopp	3:33
6.	"Guys from the Gord"	Bassal; Holmes; Tanner; Hunter	3:00
7.	"Shimmer"	Bassal; Tanner; Hunter; Jenna McDougall	3:45
8.	"Baby Cobra"	Bassal; Hunter	3:14
9.	"Ask for the Anthem"	Bassal; Holmes; Tanner; Kopp	3:17
10.	"Sway"	Bassal; Kopp	1:22
11.	"Junkie$"	Bassal; Tanner; Hunter; Henley	3:32
12.	"Freaks"	Bassal; Tanner; Kopp	4:17

== Personnel ==
Credits are adapted from the album's liner notes.

- Dale Tanner – lead vocals
- Twiggy Hunter – bass, vocals, lead vocals on "NEO" and "Baby Cobra"
- Matthew Henley – guitars
- Sam Bassal – drums, production, engineered, mastering, mixing
- Running Touch – samples, vocals, lead vocals on "Sway"

== Charts ==
Sales chart performance for Flip Phone Fantasy
Chart (2020)	Peak position
Australia (ARIA)	8
