= Between Us (Hayden James album) =

Studio album by Hayden James
- Released: 14 June 2019
- Genre: Electronic
- Length: 40:30
- Label: Future Classic

Hayden James chronology
Hayden James (2013)	Between Us (2019)	Lifted (2022)

Singles from Between Us
- 1. "Numb" Released: 6 October 2017; 2. "Just Friends" Released: 27 April 2018; 3. "Better Together" Released: 2 November 2018; 4. "Nowhere to Go" Released: 3 May 2019; 5. "Favours" Released: 13 June 2019

Between Us is the debut studio album by Australian songwriter and record producer Hayden James. James told Billboard the album represents "the journey through different stages of relationships; love, separation and ultimately hope". The album was released on 14 June 2019.

James added in a Press release "Everything that I write obviously has my own DNA in it. It's important to me to make sure that when people listen to a record of mine they know it's a Hayden James record without having to look it up, and that comes to production techniques I use or the way I actually write the songs. So this record is more of a development of my sounds than anything else."

At the ARIA Music Awards of 2019, the album was nominated for Best Male Artist.

At the J Awards of 2019, the album was nominated for Australian Album of the Year.

== Critical reception ==
Professional ratings
Review scores
Source	Rating
The Music	4/5 stars

Between Us received widespread acclaim.

Carley Hall from the Music gave the album 4 out of 5 saying "With Between Us, James shows he is more than the usual blockbuster anthems we have come to expect." Triple J said "[James] has pulled out all the stops across eleven deep house tracks. From top shelf collaborators to propulsive bass lines and melodic hooks, this is home grown dance at its finest."

== Track listing ==
No.	Title	Writer(s)	Producer(s)	Length
1.	"Hold Me Back" (featuring Boy Matthews)	Hayden Luby; Cassian Stewart-Kasima; James Norton; Sebastian Daniel	Hayden James; Cassian	3:07
2.	"Nowhere to Go" (with Naations)	Luby; Ilan Kidron; Natalie Dunn; Nicholas Routledge	James; Cassian^{[b]}	3:24
3.	"Just Friends" (featuring Boy Matthews)	Luby; Norton	James; Cassian^{[b]}	3:58
4.	"Feelin' (Interlude)"	Luby; Jarrah McCleary	James; Cassian	2:43
5.	"Lost to You" (featuring Farr)	Luby; Romeo Testa	James; Cassian	3:29
6.	"Better Together" (featuring Running Touch)	Luby; Stewart-Kasima; Matthew Kopp; Jack Glass	James; Running Touch; Cassian	3:56
7.	"Between Us" (featuring Panama)	Luby; Stewart-Kasima; McCleary	James; Cassian	5:23
8.	"Remember You" (featuring Elderbrook)	Luby	James; Moglii	2:48
9.	"Favours" (with Nat Dunn)	Luby; Dunn; Tre Jean-Marie; Corey Sanders	James; Cassian	3:54
10.	"Numb" (with Graace)	Luby; Stewart-Kasima; Grace Pitts	James; Cassian	3:37
11.	"Weightless" (featuring Shungudzo)	Luby; Alexander Kotz; Simon Ebener-Holscher	James; Cassian	4:04

== Charts ==
=== Weekly charts ===
Chart (2019)	Peak position
Australian Albums (ARIA)	9
Lithuanian Albums (AGATA)	98

=== Year-end charts ===
Chart (2019)	Position
Australian Artist Albums (ARIA)	26
Chart (2020)	Position
Australian Artist Albums (ARIA)	31

== Release history ==
Region	Date	Format(s)	Label
Australia	14 June 2019	CD; digital download; vinyl	Future Classic
