= AIR Awards of 2015 =

Annual Australian music awards ceremony

- Date: 22 October 2015
- Venue: The Meat Market, North Melbourne, Australia
- Hosted by: Dylan Lewis

Highlights
- Most wins: Courtney Barnett (3)
- Most nominations: Courtney Barnett and Hermitude (4)
- Website: https://air.org.au/air-awards/

The AIR Awards of 2015 (or Carlton Dry Independent Music Awards of 2015) is the tenth annual Australian Independent Record Labels Association Music Awards (generally known as the AIR Awards) and was an award ceremony at The Meat Market, North Melbourne on 22 October 2015. The event was again sponsored by Australian liquor brand, Carlton Dry. The Carlton Dry Global Music Grant award was removed this year, after two previous appearances.

Courtney Barnett won Best Independent Artist and Best Independent Single for the second consecutive year.

== Performers ==
- Bad//Dreems
- Airling
- Dead Letter Circus
- Harts and John Butler

== Nominees and winners ==
=== AIR Awards ===
Winners are listed first and highlighted in boldface; other final nominees are listed alphabetically.

Best Independent Artist	Best Independent Album
**Courtney Barnett**; #1 Dads; Chet Faker; Hermitude; Vance Joy	**Courtney Barnett – Sometimes I Sit and Think, and Sometimes I Just Sit**; Number 1 Dads – About Face; Flight Facilities – Down to Earth; Hermitude – Dark Night Sweet Light; Vance Joy – Dream Your Life Away
Best Independent Single or EP	Breakthrough Independent Artist of the Year
**Courtney Barnett – "Depreston"**; Bad//Dreems – "Cuffed & Collared"; Courtney Barnett – "Pedestrian At Best"; Hermitude featuring Mataya & Young Tapz – "The Buzz"; Vance Joy – "Fire and the Flood"	**Number 1 Dads**; Briggs; Client Liaison; Japanese Wallpaper; Totally Mild
Best Independent Blues and Roots Album	Best Independent Classical Album
**C. W. Stoneking - Gon' Boogaloo**; Fraser A. Gorman – Slow Gum; Gurrumul – The Gospel Album; Marlon Williams – Marlon Williams; Paul Kelly - The Merri Soul Sessions	**Australian Brandenburg Orchestra – Brandenburg Celebrates**; Alicia Crossley – Alchemy; Amir Farid – Amir Farid Plays Javad Maroufi: Golden Dreams and Other Works; Amy Dickson and Sydney Symphony Orchestra – Island Songs; Zubin Kanga – Piano Inside Out
Best Independent Country Album	Best Independent Dance/Electronica Album
**Frank Yamma – Uncle**; Amber Lawrence – Superheroes; Jim Lawrie – Eons; Raised By Eagles – Diamonds in the Bloodstream; Troy Cassar-Daley – Freedom Ride	**Flight Facilities – Down to Earth**; Collarbones – Return; Hermitude – Dark Night Sweet Light; Seekae – The Worry; Ta-ku – Songs to Break Up to
Best Independent Dance, Electronica or Club Single	Best Independent Hard Rock, Heavy or Punk Album
**Hayden James – "Something About You"**; Collarbones – "Turning"; Generik featuring Nicky Van She – "The Weekend"; Nicky Night Time featuring Nat Dunn – "Gonna Get Better"; Rüfüs – "You Were Right"	**King Gizzard & the Lizard Wizard – I'm in Your Mind Fuzz**; British India – Nothing Touches Me; Northlane – Node; The Peep Tempel – Tales; The Smith Street Band – Throw Me in the River
Best Independent Hip Hop Album	Best Independent Jazz Album
**Seth Sentry – Strange New Past**; Baro – 17/18; Briggs – Sheplife; Citizen Kay – Demokracy; One Day – Mainline	**Barney Mcall – Mooroolbark**; Allan Browne Quintet – Ithaca Bound; Gian Slater – Still Still; Mike Nock Octet – Suite Sima; Sarah Mckenzie – We Could Be Lovers
Best Independent Label
**Milk! Records**

== See also ==
- Music of Australia
