= Xavier Dunn =

Australian musician

- Origin: Sydney, New South Wales, Australia
- Genres: Folk; electronic; alternative; indie
- Occupations: Musician; producer
- Years active: 2015–present
- Labels: 1825 Records; Ghost Cat; Warner Music Australia

Xavier Dunn is an Australian singer-songwriter, musician, and producer based in Sydney.

He is known for collaborating and producing with Jack River, including her 2018 debut album Sugar Mountain.

Dunn has co-written and produced for many Australian artists, including Cxloe, Carmada, Nina Las Vegas, Super Cruel and Graace.

== Early life and career ==
Dunn grew up in New South Wales. He began playing the piano in primary school, performing in school bands. In February 2016, he released an EP of pop and hip hop songs, titled Bimyou. The album featured acoustic covers of Iggy Azalea's "Fancy", Kanye West's "Gold Digger", among others.

In May 2018, Dunn released his first EP of original songs, proceeded by the singles "Isic Tutor" and "Warming". Dunn performed all instruments on the album.

In May 2021, the artist launched his own record label and released his third EP, featuring covers of Drake's "Hold On, We're Going Home", Calvin Harris' "Summer", and others.

== Discography ==
=== EPs ===
Title	EP details
Bimyou	Released: 2 February 2016; Label: 1825 Records; Formats: digital download, streaming
Isic Tutor	Released: 18 May 2018; Label: 1825 Records/ Warner Music Australia; Formats: digital download, streaming
Bimyou Two	Released: 27 May 2021; Label: Ghost Cat Records; Formats: digital download, streaming

=== Singles ===
As lead artist

Title	Year	Album
"Scattered"	2016	Non-album singles
"Straight on Till Morning"	2016	Non-album singles
"Give in" (featuring Airling)	2016	Non-album singles
"Isic Tutor"	2018	Isic Tutor
"Warming"	2018	Isic Tutor
"You Lately"	2019	Non-album singles
"Good Time"	2019	Non-album singles
"I Think We're Alone Now" (with Sarah Wolf)	2020	Non-album singles
"Mid Sentence" (featuring Gretta Ray)	2020	Non-album singles
"Payphone"	2020	Non-album singles
"My Mother Told Me"	2020	Non-album singles
"Margot Robbie" (as XD Project featuring Eluera)	2022	TBA
"Hold Me" (as XD Project featuring Sarah Wolf)	2022	TBA
"One on One" (as XD Project with Lola Scott)	2023	TBA
"Better Be Ready" (as XD Project featuring Boo Seeka)	2023	TBA

As featured artist

Title	Year	Album
The Only One" (Magnifik featuring Xavier Dunn)	2015	Gentlemen of Disco
"Folding Hills" (Ford featuring Xavier Dunn)	2016	
"Little Higher" (Terace featuring Xavier Dunn)	2016	
"Hard for Me" (Paces featuring Xavier Dunn)	2016	Vacation
"See Right Through Me" (Set Mo featuring Xavier Dunn)	2016	
"The Weekend" (Jessie Porches featuring Xavier Dunn)	2017	
"Embrace" (NGHTMRE & Carmada featuring Xavier Dunn)	2017	
"Long Distance" (Maison Ware featuring Xavier Dunn)	2025	

Other appearances

List of other appearances year released and album shown
Title	Year	Album
"Down on Me" (Hayden James featuring Xavier Dunn)	2022	Lifted
