= Novaa =

German singer, songwriter and record producer (born 1996)

- Also known as: La Petite Rouge; Novalty; Yosie
- Born: Antonia Rug; 1996 (age 29–30); Germany
- Genres: Synth-pop
- Occupations: Singer; songwriter; record producer
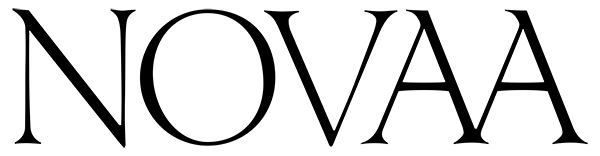

Antonia Rug (born 1996), known professionally as Novaa, is a German singer, songwriter and record producer. She has also used the stage names La Petite Rouge, Novalty and Yosie.

== Biography ==
Novaa grew up in Karlsruhe. She was named after the main character of the Dutch film Antonia's Line. She wrote her first songs with guitar and piano at the age of 11. She started producing with Ableton when she was 15. She dropped out of her studies in pop music design at the Popakademie Baden-Württemberg after a year to produce her first EP. The progress of her work on the EP, which was initially planned as Peaches, was ultimately released as Stolen Peaches, because her laptop was stolen. The producer and musician Moglii was involved in Novaa's first singles.

As a songwriter and producer, she has worked for LEA, Alma, Amanda Tenfjord, Phela, Alli Neumann and Jazzy Gudd, among others.

Novaa lives in Berlin.

== Musical style ==
Novaa's releases can be classified as synth-pop. She combines electronic elements with orchestral and other organic elements. She herself describes this style as "organic electronics". In addition to the personal, common topics in her texts include gender roles, female self-determination, climate change and the interaction between humans and machines. Lizzo is one of her role models.

== Discography ==
=== Albums ===
- 2019: NOVAA
- 2020: The Futurist
- 2021: She's A Rose
- 2022: She's A Star
- 2023: Super Novaa

=== EPs ===
- 2015: HARI (as La Petite Rouge)
- 2016: Down Under (with Moglii)
- 2016: Stolen Peaches
- 2021: MooN (with Moglii)

=== As Novalty ===
- 2019: Vol.1 (EP)
- 2019: Vol.2 (EP)
- 2019: Vol.3 (EP)

=== As Yosie ===
- 2017: Lights (with Lo)
