= Ocean Grove (band) =

Australian metal band

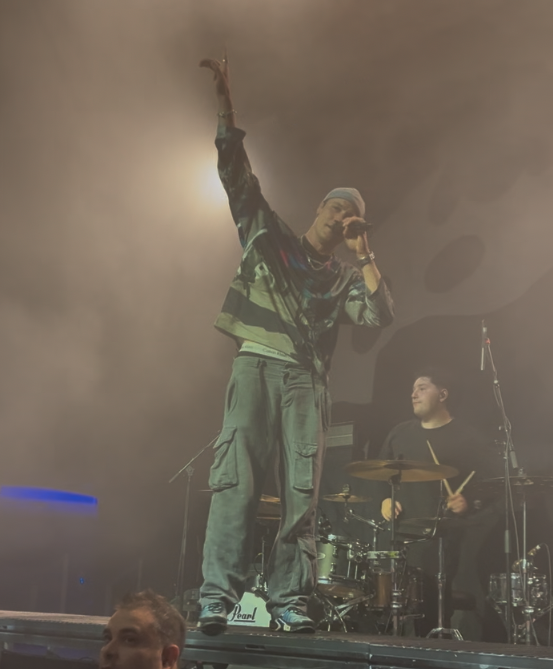
- Oceangrove in 2026

Background information
- Origin: Melbourne, Australia
- Genres: Nu metal; alternative metal
- Years active: 2010–present
- Labels: SharpTone; UNFD; BMG; Oddworld
- Members: Dale Tanner; Sam Bassal; Twiggy Hunter; Luke Holmes; Matthew Kopp
- Past members: Jimmy Hall; Matias Morales; Matthew Henley
- Website: oceangrove.tv

Ocean Grove are an Australian nu metal band formed in 2010. The band consists of the core trio of vocalist Dale Tanner, drummer/producer/guitarist Sam Bassal, and bassist/vocalist Brent "Twiggy" Hunter, alongside studio-only members Luke "Poochy" Holmes and guitarist/producer Matthew "Running Touch" Kopp.

As of 2024, the band has released four studio albums; The Rhapsody Tapes (2017), Flip Phone Fantasy (2020), and Up in the Air Forever (2022) through UNFD, and Oddworld (2024) through SharpTone Records.

== History ==
=== 2010–2016: Formation and EPs ===
Ocean Grove were formed in 2010 in Melbourne, originally as a post-hardcore band by Luke Holmes (lead vocals), Dale Tanner (vocals/bass), Running Touch, Jimmy Hall (guitar) and Matias Morales (drums). This line-up released a demo in 2010, followed by their debut extended play, Outsider in 2013, before Morales departed the band later that year and was replaced by Sam Bassal. A single was released in late 2013 called "The Dead Years". In 2014, Running Touch stopped touring with the band to focus on his solo project, while remaining as a studio member and Matt Henley was brought in as their new live guitarist. On 12 June 2015, the band released their second extended play, Black Label, which peaked at No. 50 on the ARIA Albums Chart. It was followed by the Black Label Tour around Australia in July 2015 with support from Devastator and Void of Vision. The band was a supporting act, alongside Like Moths to Flames, Buried in Verona and August Burns Red for Northlane's headlining Australian tour in November 2015. In 2016, Ocean Grove supported both In Hearts Wake and Northlane on their "Equinox" dual-headlining tour.

=== 2016–2018: The Rhapsody Tapes ===
On 27 April 2016, the band had signed with UNFD and released a new single, "Lights on Kind of Lover". The EP Black Label was released the United States and Europe under the revised title, Black Label (Sublime Vol.), with "Lights on Kind of Lover" included.

On 1 December 2016, Ocean Grove released a new single, "These Boys Light Fires". On 21 December they released another single, "Intimate Alien", along with its music video and announced that they would release their debut album, The Rhapsody Tapes, on 3 February 2017. Upon its release The Rhapsody Tapes reached No. 5 on the ARIA Albums Chart in its first week, and was selected as a "Feature Album" by Australian radio station, Triple J.

On 24 May 2017, Ocean Grove announced their national headlining tour, which spanned from 4 to 12 August with support from Justice for the Damned, Broken, and the Beverly Chills. The band then went on to support Northlane on their Mesmer World Tour across Europe and the United Kingdom, alongside Erra and Invent Animate, from 23 November to 16 December 2017. This was followed up directly by their first appearance in the USA, supporting August Burns Red on their 38-date 'The Phantom Anthem Tour', alongside Born of Osiris and Erra in January and February 2018.

Ocean Grove were one of the bands that performed at the first ever Download Festival Australia at Melbourne's Flemington Racecourse on 24 March 2018, as well as playing shows that same week in Sydney, Brisbane, and Adelaide supporting Limp Bizkit and Of Mice & Men.

=== 2018–2021: Line-up changes and Flip Phone Fantasy ===
On 2 May 2018, Ocean Grove signed a worldwide publishing deal with BMG. In an interview with Depth magazine, Dale Tanner revealed that the band was working on material for a new album, then stating in a separate interview with Spotlight Report that a new single would come out later in the year with a new album possibly coming out in 2019.

On 14 December 2018, Ocean Grove released a new single "Glass Gloss", and announced that vocalist Luke Holmes and guitarist Jimmy Hall would be leaving the band and will be performing with the band for the last time at the Unify Gathering on 11 January 2019, with the band continuing on as a four-piece.

On 3 February 2019, the band released a teaser for their new member in the style of the Tony Hawk's Pro Skater character selection menu. On 4 February 2019, they premiered a new single, 'Ask for the Anthem' and announced the addition of Twiggy Hunter to the lineup as bassist and backing vocalist, with Dale Tanner moving to full-time frontman. On 1 October 2021, the band announced the departure of live guitarist Matt Henley.

=== 2022–present: Up in the Air Forever and Oddworld ===
In January 2022, the group announced their third studio album, Up in the Air Forever will be released on 22 April 2022. The album was proceeded by the singles "Cali Sun", "Silver Lining" and "Sex Dope Gold", and featured a more melodic alternative rock-influenced sound.

In May 2024, the band announced the launch of their own label, Oddworld Records, while also officially signing to SharpTone Records. Ocean Grove released the single "Fly Away" that May and "My Disaster" in July 2024, showcasing a more aggressive metalcore influence within their nu metal sound. In August of that year, they released the single "Raindrop" and announced their fourth album (and first for SharpTone), Oddworld, released on 22 November 2024. It's during this album campaign where the band revealed that since their departure that both Matthew Kopp and Luke Holmes have been involved in the band in varying degrees in the background, and though they may perform at select shows live they will remain predominantly as studio members for the foreseeable, referring to the whole group as "The Oddworld Collective."

== Musical style and influences ==
Ocean Grove is a nu metal and alternative metal band. They have also incorporated elements of metalcore, hip-hop, hardcore punk, and grunge. The band has described their sound as "Odd World Music" and reference it as such in their lyrics. Louder Sound described the group's sound as a "scattershot cocktail of hardcore, nu metal, grunge, alt-rock and electronic hip-hop."

The band members have cited a variety of musical influences such as Faith No More, The Prodigy, Silverchair, Nirvana, Gorillaz, Korn, Deftones, Incubus, Slipknot, Fatboy Slim, Queens Of The Stone Age, Mastodon, N.E.R.D., The Neptunes, Justin Timberlake, P.O.D., From Autumn to Ashes, ABBA, M83, The Libertines, Michael Jackson, Silverstein, Pleymo, Maroon 5, A Tribe Called Quest, Limp Bizkit, N.W.A., Green Day, Vampire Weekend, Oasis, British India, Marilyn Manson and Daft Punk.

== Band members ==
Current

- Dale Tanner – vocals (2010–present), bass guitar (2010–2019)
- Sam Bassal – drums (2013–present), guitar (2021–present; studio only)
- Brent "Twiggy" Hunter – bass, vocals (2019–present)
- Luke Holmes – vocals (2010–2019; full time, 2024–present; studio only)
- Matthew Kopp – guitar (2010–2014), samples, keyboards, vocals (2014–2021, 2024–present; studio only)

Former

- James "Jimmy" Hall – guitar (2010–2019)
- Matias Morales – drums (2010–2012)
- Emile Battour – drums, vocals (2012–2013)
- Matthew Henley – guitar (2014–2021)

Touring

- Andy Szetho – guitar (2022–2023)
- Jamie Marinos – guitar (2023–2024)
- Zak Thom – guitar (2025–2026, 2026-present)
- Feisal El-Khazragi – guitar (2026)
- Ryan Burnett – guitar (2026)

Timeline

== Discography ==
=== Albums ===
List of albums, with selected chart positions
Title	Album details	Peak chart positions
Title	Album details	AUS
The Rhapsody Tapes	Released: 3 February 2017; Label: UNFD; Formats: CD, cassette, LP, digital download, streaming	5
Flip Phone Fantasy	Released: 13 March 2020; Label: UNFD; Formats: CD, cassette, LP, digital download, streaming	8
Up in the Air Forever	Released: 22 April 2022; Label: UNFD; Formats: CD, LP, digital download, streaming	8
Oddworld	Released: 22 November 2024; Label: SharpTone; Formats: CD, LP, digital download, streaming	8

=== Extended plays ===
List of extended plays
Title	Details	Peak chart positions
Title	Details	AUS
Outsider	Released: 3 March 2013; Label: Independent; Formats: CD, LP, digital download, streaming	—
Black Label	Released: 12 June 2015; Label: Independent; Formats: CD, LP, digital download, streaming	50

=== Singles ===
List of singles
Title	Year	Album
"The Dead Years"	2013	Non-album singles
"Lights On Kind Of Lover"	2016	Black Label
"These Boys Light Fires"	2016	The Rhapsody Tapes
"Intimate Alien"	2016	The Rhapsody Tapes
"Glass Gloss"	2018	Non-album singles
"Ask for the Anthem"	2019	Flip Phone Fantasy
"Junkie$"	2019	Flip Phone Fantasy
"Sunny"	2019	Flip Phone Fantasy
"NEO"	2020	Flip Phone Fantasy
"Thousand Golden People"	2020	Flip Phone Fantasy
"Shimmer" (Acoustic)	2020	Flip Phone Fantasy
"Dream"	2020	Non-album singles
"UFO" (Triple J Like a Version)	2021	Non-album singles
"Cali Sun"	2021	Up in the Air Forever
"Silver Lining"	2022	Up in the Air Forever
"Sex Dope Gold"	2022	Up in the Air Forever
"Bored" (feat. Dune Rats)	2022	Up in the Air Forever
"Fly Away"	2024	Oddworld
"My Disaster"	2024	Oddworld
"Raindrop"	2024	Oddworld
"Last Dance"	2024	Oddworld

As featuring artist

List of singles
Title	Year	Album
"21 Devils" Super Cruel feat. Ocean Grove	2019	Non-album singles

== Awards ==
=== AIR Awards ===
The Australian Independent Record Awards (commonly known informally as AIR Awards) is an annual awards night to recognise, promote and celebrate the success of Australia's independent music sector.

Year	Nominee / work	Award	Result	Ref.
2025	Oddworld	Best Independent Heavy Album or EP	Nominated	

=== APRA Music Awards ===
The APRA Music Awards were established by Australasian Performing Right Association (APRA) in 1982 to honour the achievements of songwriters and music composers, and to recognise their song writing skills, sales and airplay performance, by its members annually.

Year	Nominee / work	Award	Result	Ref.
2026	"Raindrop"	Most Performed Hard Rock / Heavy Metal Work	Won	
