= Nowhere to Go (Hayden James song) =

Single by Hayden James featuring Naations

from the album Between Us
- Released: 3 May 2019
- Genre: Dance-pop
- Length: 3:24
- Label: Future Classic
- Songwriter(s): Hayden Luby; Ilan Kidron; Natalie Dunn; Nicholas Routledge
- Producer(s): Hayden James; Cassian

Hayden James singles chronology
"Better Together" (2018)	"Nowhere to Go" (2019)	"Favours" (2019)

Naations singles chronology
"Let it Go" (2018)	"Nowhere to Go" (2019)	"Do It Right" (2019)

"Nowhere to Go" is a song by Australian singer Hayden James featuring Nations. It was released on 3 May 2019 as the fourth single from James' debut studio album Between Us (2019).

In a press release, James said "I met Nicky and Nat (Naations) last year in Los Angeles [and] I played them a bunch of demos I'd been working on and one just clicked. I'd written it the night before and Nat and Nicky came with an incredible top line that just fit perfectly. This song has always had a big summer vibe for me—I feel a sense of freedom and hope and the notion of ‘you only live once’ so make the most of it...‘we ain’t got no better place to go, doesn’t matter 'cause I know you.’"

== Music video ==
The music video was released on 19 June 2019 and features the Venice-based, all-female skateboard collective GRLSWIRL. The video is set to a retro backdrop of sun-drenched tones and glowing city lights, cruising down the picturesque California coast. About the shoot, GRLSWIRL said "Skating and good music go hand in hand. Certain songs often inspire the way we skate and feel while on our boards. 'Nowhere To Go' is super groovy and one of those songs that you want to put on full blast with your girlfriends while not having a care in the world. And that's exactly what we did!"

== Critical reception ==
Some Fuamoli from Triple J said the song "...continues James' bold production patterns, building on summery house beats, the track flourishing when the synths and bass marry." adding "Nat Dunn's vocals blend beautifully against the melody too, making 'Nowhere To Go' a surefire go-to on many a summer playlist for sure."

Kat Benin from Billboard called the song "a perfect summer starter" writing "with a touch of '80s cool in its hypnotic beat and some future bass soul in the hook, this is one for the clubs for sure, but it's also perfect for driving around town or hanging with friends".

== Track listing ==
Digital download

1. "Nowhere to Go" – 3:24

Digital download

1. "Nowhere to Go" (Dom Dolla remix) - 4:34

Digital download

1. "Nowhere to Go" (Michael Calfan remix) - 2:36
2. "Nowhere to Go" (Michael Calfan extended remix) - 4:32
