= Up in the Air Forever =

Studio album by Ocean Grove
- Released: 22 April 2022
- Recorded: 2020–2021
- Genre: Nu metal
- Length: 32:42
- Label: UNFD
- Producer: Sam Bassal

Ocean Grove chronology
Flip Phone Fantasy (2020)	Up in the Air Forever (2022)	Oddworld (2024)

Singles from Up in the Air Forever
- 1. "Cali Sun" Released: 8 November 2021; 2. "Silver Lining" Released: 18 January 2022; 3. "Sex Dope Gold" Released: 23 February 2022; 4. "Bored" Released: 21 April 2022

Up in the Air Forever is the third studio album by Australian nu metal band Ocean Grove. it was released on 22 April 2022 through UNFD Records.

== Background and release ==
=== Singles ===
Four singles were released ahead of the album. The lead single, "Cali Sun" was released on 8 November 2021. On 18 January 2022, the band released their second single, "Silver Lining". The third single, "Sex Dope Gold", came out on 23 February 2022.

== Reception ==
Reviewers have noticed influences of nu metal, Britpop, contemporary R&B and grunge on the album.

== Track listing ==
Note: All track titles are stylised in all caps.

All music is composed by Dale Tanner, Sam Bassal, and Twiggy Hunter.

Up in the Air Forever track listing
No.	Title	Length
1.	"Flava"	3:21
2.	"Sex Dope Gold"	2:57
3.	"Cali Sun"	3:47
4.	"Bustin"	3:18
5.	"Silver Lining"	3:30
6.	"HMU" (featuring Lil Aaron)	1:57
7.	"Bored" (featuring Dune Rats)	3:44
8.	"Noise"	3:05
9.	"Silence"	3:15
10.	"Up in the Air Forever"	3:45
Total length:		32:42

== Personnel ==
- Dale Tanner – lead vocals
- Twiggy Hunter – bass, vocals
- Sam Bassal – drums, guitar, production, engineered, mastering, mixing

== Charts ==
Sales chart performance for Up in the Air Forever
Chart (2022)	Peak position
Australia (ARIA)	8
