= Moglii =

German electronic musician

Simon Ebener-Holscher know professionally as Moglii is a musician from Cologne, Germany.

== Early life ==
Simon Ebener-Holscher began playing musical instruments at the age of six. He first tried drums, then guitar, and then oboe before deciding on piano. He began producing his own music at 16 years old and started creating electronic music.

== Career ==
Moglii collaborated with Novaa on his first extended play releasing Down Under in 2016. In December 2017, Moglii had 250,000 monthly listeners on Spotify from 61 different countries and songs with 4 million total listens.

In the spring of 2019, Moglii released his single "Flow" and went on tour with Elderbrook throughout Europe. Moglii and LissA created the single "Face 2 Face" in Moglii's studio in Cologne and released the song in early October 2020. Released in December 2020, the official music video for Moglii's single "Push Me" which features Panama was directed by Sarah Knupfer. Moglii collaborated with R&B artist Mulay in 2023 on "Sunliight" and "Hidden in the Mist". Working in collaboration with singer-songwriter LissA, Moglii released the single "More & More" in 2023.

Ebener-Holscher is part of a five person band called Moglebaum. Moglebaum's single "Raindrops" reached #1 on Spotify's Global Viral Charts receiving over 1 million listens.

== Musical style ==
Moglii describes his music as organic electronic. The style has influences from future bass artists such as Mura Masa and Flume, however, he also draws inspiration from singer-songwriters like Bon Iver and James Blake. Moglii has connections in the Australian electronica scene having done work with artists like Hayden James and Panama.

== Discography ==
=== Studio albums ===
- Aniimals (2024)

=== Extended plays ===
- Down Under (2016) (with Novaa)
- Naboo (2017)
- ii (2019)
- Fiire (2021)
- MooN (2021) (with Novaa)

=== Singles ===
- "Down Under" (2016) (with Novaa)
- "Mother" (2016) (with Novaa)
- "Her" (2016) (with Novaa)
- "Girl" (2017)
- "Breath" (2017)
- "Tonic Water" (2017) (with Novaa)
- "Away From Me" (2017)
- "Schillerize" (2017) (with Tonio Geugelin)
- "Tonic Water (dazy Remix)" (2017) (with Novaa)
- "Flow" (2019)
- "Lone Wolf" (2019)
- "Go" (2019)
- "Indiigo" (2019)
- "Face 2 Face" (2020)
- "Skoda" (2020)
- "Oxygen" (2020)
- "Push Me" (2020)
- "Harbour" (2021)
- "Liquid Sunlight" (2021) (with Rola)
- "Canary In The Coal Mine" (2021)
- "Window" (2021)
- "Morning Dew" (2021)
- "Little Light" (2021)
- "Tu y Yo" (2021)
- "Space Birds" (2022)
- "Desert" (2022)
- "Volcano" (2022)
- "Water To The Moon / ok" (2022)
- "Monsoon / Just a Feeling" (2022)
- "Sunliight" (2023)
- "Hidden in the Mist" (2023)
- "Like You in Linen" (2023)
- "More & More" (2023)
- "Take It Or Leave It" (2023)
- "Now Or Never" (2023)
- "Unresolved" (2023) (with Mike Rauss)
- "Crush" (2023)
- "Foxx" (2023)
- "Fungii" (2023) (with Ditty)
- "Whiite Owl" (2023) (with Sophie Alice)
- "iinsects" (2024) (with Novaa)
- "Latern Fiish" (2024) (with Hataah)
- "Sunshine After Rain" (2025) (with LissA)
- "Tonic Water (Solar Punk Remix)" (2025) (with Novaa)
- "Echoes" (2025) (with TWYGS)
- "Echoes (Philipp Johann Thimm Remix)" (2025) (with TWYGS)
- "Nothing Lasts Forever" (2025)

=== Guest appearances ===
- Phebe Starr – "Lavendar Scars (Moglii Remix)" (2017)
- Tonio Geugelin – "Schillerize" from Constant Magic (2017)
- DRAMA – "Years – Moglii Remix" from Dance Without Me (Remixes) (2020)
- Johnny Kilmek & Tom Tykwer – "Wir sind uns lang verloren gegangen (Moglii Remix)" (feat. Natalia Mateo) (2020)
- Eugenio In Vio Di Gioia – "A Metà Strada" (2020)
- Fynn Kliemann – "Twingo (Moglii Remix)" (2021)
- Parra for Cuva – "Kamara" from Juno (2021)
- KLAN – "Mitternacht (feat. Josi Miller)" (2022)
- TAM – "Now or Never" from Reflections (2023)
- Tonio Geugelin – "Father" (2023)
- Bush.ida – "MONDLICHT" (2023)
- Wilhelmine – "sie (Moglii Remix)" (2024)

=== Compilation appearances ===
- "Tonic Water" (with Novaa) from Common Culture, Vol. VIII (2018)
- "Space Birds – Mixed" (with Tonio Geugelin) from Kitsuné Musique Mixed by POCKET (DJ Mix) (2022)
