= Black Label (Ocean Grove EP) =

EP by Ocean Grove
- Released: 12 June 2015
- Genre: Hardcore punk; metalcore; nu metal
- Length: 22:30 (original release); 25:27 (Sublime Vol.)
- Label: Independent; UNFD (Sublime Vol.)
- Producer: Sam Bassal

Ocean Grove chronology
Outsider (2013)	Black Label (2015)	The Rhapsody Tapes (2017)

Singles from Black Label
- 1. "Backbone" Released: 14 April 2014; 2. "B.L.U.D" Released: 29 March 2015; 3. "I Told You to Smile" Released: 12 July 2015; 4. "Lights On Kind of Lover" Released: 26 April 2016

Alternative cover
- "(Sublime Vol.)" 2016 re-issue cover

Black Label is the second EP by Australian nu metal band Ocean Grove released independently on 12 June 2015. It was later re-released through UNFD under the revised title Black Label (Sublime Vol.) on 27 April 2016 with the additional track "Lights On Kind of Lover".

== Critical reception ==
Professional ratings
Review scores
Source	Rating
Kill Your Stereo	90/100

Alex Sievers of KillYourStereo was positive about the EP, giving it a score of 90 (out of 100) and stating "From ‘Backbone’ to ‘167 Damillia’, this EP is gold the whole way through", and praised the band for evolving their sound when compared to their "underwhelming" debut EP Outsider, stating "Unlike their last EP, there is no filler, nor are there any weak links holding down the pack for us hungry critics to surround and devour. Each track is just as good as the track before it and its predecessor".

== Track listing ==
No.	Title	Length
1.	"Backbone"	1:24
2.	"B.L.U.D"	3:07
3.	"Strange Talk (featuring Adrian Fitipaldes)"	3:34
4.	"Diploid"	1:56
5.	"Cold Skin"	2:33
6.	"You Know Something We Don't?"	3:52
7.	"I Told You To Smile"	2:19
8.	"167 Damillia"	3:40

Sublime Vol. Re-Release
No.	Title	Length
9.	"Lights On Kind of Lover"	2.57

== Personnel ==
- Luke Holmes – lead vocals
- Dale Tanner – bass, vocals
- Matthew Henley – guitars
- Jimmy Hall – guitars
- Sam Bassal – drums, production, engineered, mastering, mixing
- Matthew Kopp – samples, keyboards, vocals

== Charts ==
Chart (2015)	Peak position
Australian Albums (ARIA)	50
