= Last Night (Graace song) =

2018 single by Graace

Single by Graace

from the EP Self Sabotage
- Released: 6 September 2018
- Genre: Pop
- Length: 3:29
- Label: Graace
- Songwriter(s): Grace Pitts; Xavier Dunn
- Producer(s): Xavier Dunn

Graace singles chronology
"Kissing Boys" (2018)	"Last Night" (2018)	"SOS" (2018)

Music video
- "Last Night" on YouTube

"Last night" is a song by Australian singer-songwriter Graace. It was released on 6 September 2018 as the second single from Graace's debut extended play Self Sabotage (2018). The song was certified gold in Australia in July 2019.

== Background ==
Graace said the song was written at a point when she realised her self-sabotaging nature:

"I was in the studio with Xavier and we had both recently gotten out of toxic relationships. We came to the conclusion we weren't happy within ourselves and that's what caused these relationships to fail. We weren't accepting the good things that came our way because we didn't think we deserved the love."

== Music video ==
The music video was directed by Sejon Im and released on 3 October 2018.

== Critical reception ==
AIRIT said "'Last Night' features breathy sultry vocal anchored by anthemic piano chords and alt pop production."

Max Lewis from Purple Sneakers said "Simple piano chords and isolated vocals give way to a gorgeously packed chorus with layered vocals and quiet synths. The track flows between downtrodden verses and uplifting choruses, as though the narrator is coming to some sort of realisation after a long time of struggling."

== Track listings ==
Digital download
No.	Title	Length
1.	"Last Night"	3:29

Digital download (Hi Life Remix)
No.	Title	Length
1.	"Last Night"	4:10

== Certifications ==
Region	Certification	Certified units/sales
Australia (ARIA)	Gold	35,000^{‡}
^{‡} Sales+streaming figures based on certification alone.

== Release history ==
Country	Release date	Format	Label	Version
Australia	6 September 2018	Digital download, streaming	Graace	Original version
Australia	5 April 2019	Digital download, streaming	Graace	Hi Life remix
