= Hayden James (EP) =

EP by Hayden James
- Released: 30 August 2013
- Genre: Indie pop; electronic; dance
- Length: 20:32
- Label: Future Classic

Hayden James chronology
Hayden James (2013)	Between Us (2019)

Singles from Hayden James
- 1. "Permission to Love" Released: 5 July 2013; 2. "Embrace" Released: 20 September 2013

Hayden James is the self-titled debut extended play (EP) by Australian indie pop singer, Hayden James. The five-track EP was released independently on 30 August 2013, and provided two singles, "Permission to Love" (July 2013) and "Embrace" (September). "Permission to Love" peaked at No. 19 on the ARIA Australian Artists Singles chart and No. 7 on the ARIA Hitseekers Singles chart.

== Reception ==
Ruben Seaton from ToneDeaf said; "The EP is beautifully balanced around the much-celebrated first single 'Permission to Love', which relies on masterfully warped vocals, minimalistic synth taps and sharp percussion claps."

== Track listing ==
1. "Beginnings" – 3:38
2. "Lay Down" – 4:35
3. "Permission to Love" – 4:24
4. "No Time" – 3:53
5. "Embrace" – 4:02

== Charts ==
Chart (2013)	Peak position
Australian Independent Label Albums	17

== Release history ==
Region	Date	Format(s)	Label	Catalogue
Australia	30 August 2014	CD; digital download; vinyl	Future Classic	FCL88
