= Summerskin =

Studio album by Eves Karydas
- Released: 28 September 2018
- Genre: Pop rock, alternative
- Length: 35:37

Eves Karydas chronology
Eves the Behavior (2015)	Summerskin (2018)

Singles from Summerskin
- 1. "There for You" Released: 3 November 2017; 2. "Further Than the Planes Fly" Released: 17 January 2018; 3. "Couch" Released: 18 May 2018; 4. "Damn Loyal" Released: 27 August 2018; 5. "Wildest Ones" Released: 6 February 2019

Summerskin is the debut studio album by Australian indie pop singer group Eves Karydas, released on 28 September 2018. The album peaked at number 75 on the ARIA Charts and was supported by a national tour in 2019.

Upon release, Karydas said "It documents an end and the beginning that followed. There are so many things that return me to those summers, like ripe peaches, salt on skin, sweet early morning air before it transcends into unbearable heat, olive groves, the smell of scorched pavement, lemon icy poles." adding "I grew my hair long and listened to Jeff Buckley a lot. Everything was inspiring. I made a record that made me feel good."

== Background and release ==
In July 2015, Eves Karydas released her debut EP Eves the Behaviour and shortly after began working on her debut album. She later reflected on this saying "I just felt like another girl, another day, with this male producer wearing a cap, sitting on his laptop. When you're in the room every day, you can't come up with enough meaningful concepts, and so I just end up writing meaningless music. It's like looking at myself through a veil or something. It just feels wrong." She relocated to Los Angeles temporarily before moving to London, where she lives in a packed share-house" which proved to be the catalyst for what the record ended up being like with the "feeling of displacement and being very far away from home" shaping many of album's inner-themes and inspiration. Karydas describes the album as a documentation of her life in London saying "When you move anywhere... there's so many things that change in your environment and that makes you change as a person."

== Reception ==
Professional ratings
Review scores
Source	Rating
The Music	3.5/5 stars

James d'Apice from The Music said "Mature and evocative, Summerskin is more of an album than most collections of tunes we are treated to these days. A sense of rhythm and consistency shine through these songs." adding "This is not a loose assembly of reflections or a couple of solid ideas thrown together, Summerskin has a beating heart. It sings intricately of love and the little worlds we build for ourselves." calling the album "Engaging and impressive stuff."

Hayden Davies from Pilerats said "Summerskin is a bold and uplifting display of Karydas' pop brilliance that glistens with a slick and polished shine." adding "Feature singles such as 'Couch', 'Further Than the Planes Fly' and 'Damn Loyal' unite Karydas' triumphant and soaring vocal with head-turning productions that give it a strong push into commercial success, while others - such as the album's closing 'Wildest Ones' and 'Honest' - offer a more tender and down-tempo side of her pop brilliance, each thick with the emotion that the album's creation suggests.

Tim Lambert from Stack Magazine said "Summerskin is one of the strongest releases of the year in a booming Australian pop scene."

== Track listing ==
No.	Title	Length
1.	"Hush"	3:05
2.	"Honest"	3:26
3.	"Couch"	3:34
4.	"Further Than the Planes Fly"	3:10
5.	"Damn Loyal"	3:29
6.	"How Bound"	3:13
7.	"Balance"	3:59
8.	"First Love"	3:25
9.	"There for You"	4:12
10.	"Wildest Ones"	4:04
Total length:		35:37

== Charts ==
Chart (2018)	Peak position
Australian Albums (ARIA)	75

== Release history ==
Region	Date	Format	Label	Catalogue	Ref.
Australia	28 September 2018	CD; digital download; streaming	Dew Process / Universal Music Australia	DEW9001086	
