= Lifted (Hayden James album) =

Studio album by Hayden James
- Released: 8 April 2022
- Length: 37:29
- Label: Future Classic

Hayden James chronology
Between Us (2019)	Lifted (2022)	We Could Be Love (2024)

Singles from Lifted
- 1. "Waiting for Nothing" Released: 5 November 2021; 2. "Hold Tight" Released: 28 January 2022; 3. "On Your Own" Released: 4 March 2022; 4. "Lights Go Down" Released: 8 April 2022

Lifted is the second studio album by Australian songwriter and record producer Hayden James. The album was released on 8 April 2022.

The album was supported by the Australian and New Zealand Lifted Tour, which commenced in Brisbane in August 2022.

== Background and release ==
James began working on Lifted in "late 2020" after the COVID-19 pandemic stopped him from touring. He told Triple J "The result is a huge emotional, energetic dance record, with elements of piano-house, melodic house and a positive tone and feel that can be found across all tracks. When I write an album, everything has a place and a purpose, and it's all part of the bigger story. I'm so happy with the journey of this album."

The album was announced via James' twitter on 19 January 2022, where he released the cover art and release date of 8 April 2022.

== Track listing ==
Lifted track listing
No.	Title	Writer(s)	Producer(s)	Length
1.	"Lights Go Down" (with Sidepiece)	Hayden James; Richard Mears IV; Dylan Ragland; Benjamin Gumbleton	James; Sidepiece; Boo Seeka	3:03
2.	"Hold Tight"	James; Christopher Mears; Gabriella Feldman; Robbie McDade	James; Cassian	2:56
3.	"Fade" (featuring Flynn)	James; Dominic Matheson; Tudor Davis; Darren Flynn	James	4:21
4.	"On Your Own" (with Cassian featuring Elderbrook)	James; Cassian Stewart-Kasima; Alexander Kotz	James; Cassian; Elderbrook	3:43
5.	"Waiting for Nothing" (featuring Yaeger)	James; Hanna Gillian Jager; John Morgan; William Lansley	James; Punctual	4:08
6.	"Free" (featuring Boo Seeka)	James; Michael Belsar; Gumbleton	James	5:18
7.	"Down On Me" (featuring Xavier Dunn)	James; Xavier Dunn	James; Dunn	3:39
8.	"Lifted" (featuring Tudor)	James; Davis; Michael Dable	James; Tudor; Tesba	4:30
9.	"I Won't Let You Down" (with Jem Cooke)	James; Belsar; Jemma Victoria Cooke	James	5:51
Total length:				37:29

== Charts ==
Chart performance for Lifted
Chart (2022)	Peak position
Australian Albums (ARIA)	68
