= Naations =

Australian electronic music duo

- Origin: Australia
- Years active: 2016–present
- Labels: First Access Records; (2018—present)
- Members: Nat Dunn; Nicholas Routledge
- Website: www.naations.com

Naations are an Australian electronic music duo composed of singer, songwriter Nat Dunn and producer Nicholas Routledge and established in 2016. They are best known for their collaborations with Duke Dumont and Hayden James.

== Career ==
In 2015, Natalie Dunn featured on two of Routledge's tracks (as Nicky Night Time). Naations was formed in 2016 and released their debut release "Kingdom" in August 2016. Their follow up single "Alive" was their introduction to UK radio, and gained support from BBC Radio 1. In June 2017, their collaboration with Duke Dumont and Gorgon City reached the top 40 in the United Kingdom.

The duo signed with First Access Records in 2018 and released "Touch Me" in March 2018, the first release on the label.

The duo's debut EP Teardrop was released in September 2018 and supported Anne-Marie on her 2018 Australian tour.

== Discography ==
=== Extended plays ===
Title	EP details
Teardrop	Released: 21 September 2018; Formats: digital download, streaming; Label: Access Records

=== Singles ===
==== As lead artist ====
List of singles released as lead artist
Title	Year	Peak chart positions	Album
Title	Year	NZ Hot	Album
"Kingdom"	2016	—	non album singles
"Alive"	2017	—	non album singles
"Want Me More"	2017	—	non album singles
"Touch Me"	2018	—	non album singles
"Air & Water"	2018	—	Teardrop
"Longtime"	2018	—	Teardrop
"Nowhere to Go"(with Hayden James)	2019	26	Between Us (Hayden James album)
"Do It Right"	2019	—	TBA

==== As featured artist ====
List of singles, with selected chart positions
Title	Year	Peak chart positions		Album
Title	Year	UK	IRE	Album
"Don't Say Away" (King Henry featuring Naations)	2016	—	—	Don't Say Away (EP)
"Real Life" (Duke Dumont with Gorgon City featuring Naations)	2017	31	70	Escape
"Let It Go" (Gorgon City featuring Naations)	2018	—	—	Escape
