= Numb (Hayden James song) =

Single by Hayden James featuring Graace

from the album Between Us
- Released: 6 October 2017
- Recorded: 2017
- Genre: Electronic
- Length: 3:37
- Label: Future Classic
- Songwriters: Hayden Luby; Cassian Stewart-Kasima; Grace Pitts
- Producers: Hayden James; Cassian

Hayden James singles chronology
"Just a Lover" (2016)	"Numb" (2017)	"Just Friends" (2018)

Graace singles chronology
"Numb" (2017)	"Kissing Boys" (2018)

"Numb" is a song by Australian singer Hayden James featuring Sydney-based vocalist Graace. It was released on 6 October 2017 as the lead single from James' debut studio album Between Us (2019). The song has peaked at number 48 on the ARIA Singles Chart.

== Critical reception ==
Anmplify said: "'Numb' is a captivating arrangement of velvety vocals, punctuated by crafty synthesisers and an addictive bass line. The refined track begins slow with a buoyant melody, only to build into an infectious jam, dripping with emotion."

== Track listing ==
Digital download

1. "Numb" – 3:37

Digital download

1. "Numb" – 3:37
2. "Numb" (Friend Within remix) – 5:18
3. "Numb" (Pluko remix) – 3:34

== Charts ==
Chart (2017)	Peak position
Australia (ARIA)	48
Australian Artist Singles (ARIA)	6

== Certifications ==
Region	Certification	Certified units/sales
Australia (ARIA)	3× Platinum	210,000^{‡}
New Zealand (RMNZ)	Platinum	30,000^{‡}
^{‡} Sales+streaming figures based on certification alone.
