= Further Than the Planes Fly =

Single by Eves Karydas

from the album Summerskin
- Released: 17 January 2018
- Length: 2:58
- Label: Dew Process
- Songwriter(s): Sam Dixon, Hannah Karydas

Eves Karydas singles chronology
"There for You" (2017)	"Further Than the Planes Fly" (2018)	"Couch" (2018)

"Further Than the Planes Fly" is a song by Australian indie-pop singer Eves Karydas. It was released on 17 January 2018 as the second single from her forthcoming debut studio album Summerskin. The single was certified gold in Australia in March 2019.

Karydas said she wrote the song shortly after moving to London and when she suddenly fell in love and the song follows the arc of that relationship "It was the first time I think I'd ever felt in love and I just remember very specific details about a certain day when I was riding the number 36 bus and then there was a sunset and a plane that streaked across the sky... as corny as it sounds."

== Reception ==
Jessica McSweeny from The AU Review wrote: "The single feels on trend yet effortlessly fresh, with clean harmonies and a soaring soprano hook that shows off Karydas as the talented vocalist that she is. It's a summer single with a punch, delivering a catchy chorus that gets instantly stuck in your head."

== Track listing ==
Digital download

1. "Further Than the Plane Fly" – 2:58

Digital download

1. "Further Than the Plane Fly" (acoustic) – 3:14

== Certifications ==
Region	Certification	Certified units/sales
Australia (ARIA)	Platinum	70,000^{‡}
^{‡} Sales+streaming figures based on certification alone.
