= The Rhapsody Tapes =

Studio album by Ocean Grove
- Released: 3 February 2017
- Recorded: 2016
- Genre: Nu metal
- Length: 37:20
- Label: UNFD
- Producer: Sam Bassal, Running Touch

Ocean Grove chronology
Black Label (2015)	''The Rhapsody Tapes'' (2017)	Flip Phone Fantasy (2020)

Singles from The Rhapsody Tapes
- 1. "These Boys Light Fires" Released: 1 December 2016; 2. "Intimate Alien" Released: 21 December 2016; 3. "Thunderdome" Released: 13 March 2017

The Rhapsody Tapes is the debut studio album by Australian nu metal band Ocean Grove. it was released on 3 February 2017 through UNFD Records. Their first single "These Boys Light Fires" was released on 1 December 2016. followed by another single "Intimate Alien" which was released on 21 December 2016 along with the music video for the single and the pre-order for the album. The album reached #5 on the ARIA Albums Chart in its first week of release, and was selected as a "Feature Album" by Australian radio station Triple J almost two weeks ahead of the album's release.

== Critical reception ==
Professional ratings
Review scores
Source	Rating
Already Heard	4/5 stars
Dead Press	7/10
Depth	(positive)
Ghost Cult Magazine	8.5/10 stars
Hysteria	10/10 stars
Kill Your Stereo	94/100
Louder Sound	3.5/5 stars
The Soundboard Reviews	7/10 stars
Spotlight Report	4.5/5 stars

The Rhapsody Tapes received critical acclaim upon release. Jonty Simmons of Hysteria Magazine was very positive about the album, giving it a perfect score of 10 and stating "The Rhapsody Tapes solidifies their position atop the pile of DIY wunderkinds. When the rest of us have already teleported to their dimension of hyperreality, those who refuse to give it a chance will regret not jumping on the ship earlier". Alex Sievers of KillYourStereo gave the album a score of 94 (out of 100) and stated that the band "has challenged the preconceived notions of their art and music from both fans and detractors alike" and also stating that the album is "not only crammed full of new classics but is also their best work yet".

== Commercial performance ==
On the chart dated 13 February 2017, The Rhapsody Tapes debuted at number on the ARIA Albums Chart at number 5. The following week, the album fell into the lower fifty. On the chart dated 14 February 2022, The Rhapsody Tapes re-entered the ARIA Albums Chart at number 94, five years after its initial peak.

== Track listing ==
No.	Title	Length
1.	"What I Love About a Natural Woman"	1:21
2.	"Beers"	2:51
3.	"Thunderdome"	3:44
4.	"Intimate Alien"	3:32
5.	"The Wrong Way"	3:44
6.	"Slow Soap Soak"	1:50
7.	"These Boys Light Fires"	3:22
8.	"When You're This High You Can Say What You Like"	3:28
9.	"Mr Centipede"	4:20
10.	"From Dalight"	2:02
11.	"Stratosphere Love"	4:13
12.	"Hitachi"	2:49

== Personnel ==
- Luke Holmes – lead vocals
- Dale Tanner – bass, vocals
- Matthew Henley – guitars
- Jimmy Hall – guitars
- Sam Bassal – drums, production, engineered, mastering, mixing
- Matthew Kopp (aka Running Touch) – samples, keyboards, vocals, production, engineered, mastering, mixing

== Charts ==
Chart (2017)	Peak position
Australian Albums (ARIA)	5
