= Just a Lover =

Single by Hayden James
- Released: 17 June 2016
- Recorded: 2016
- Genre: Electronic; trance
- Length: 2:50
- Label: Future Classic
- Songwriter(s): Alexander Burnett; Hayden Luby

Hayden James singles chronology
"Something About You" (2014)	"Just a Lover" (2016)	"Numb" (2017)

Music video
- "Just a Lover" on YouTube

"Just a Lover" is a song by Australian record producer Hayden James, It was released on 17 June 2016 via the Future Classic label. It follows from the success of his 2014 single, "Something About You" which was Triple J's most played song over summer 2014 and 2015. The track features pitched down vocals from Australian singer George Maple.

A remixes EP was released on 19 August 2016. A second remixes EP was released on 21 October 2016.

"Just a Lover" was nominated for Best Dance Release at the ARIA Music Awards of 2016.

== Critical reception ==
Collin Robinson from Stereo Gum said; "Warped, whomping synth bass churns around intricate percussion for an updated '80s-leaning aesthetic. James' androgynous voice interjects with a catchy melody on the simple repeated refrain "In my heart, you were just a lover/ I can't bare for you to leave." All of the elements come together to make one hell of festival dance romp."

Amber De Luca from Fashion Journal said; "Hayden James has come through and delivered. "Just A Lover" is the epitome of the ultimate Sunday sesh anthem."

Aaron Blum from Indie Shuffle said; "Hayden James is back with another gem called "Just A Lover," and it's pretty dang amazing. The song picks up right where he left off, featuring that infectious deep groove."

== Music video ==
The music video for "Just a Lover" was directed by SPLINTR and released on 12 September 2016.

== Track listing ==
Digital download

1. "Just a Lover" – 2:50

Remixes EP

1. "Just a Lover" (Extended Outro Mix) – 3:36
2. "Just a Lover" (Pomo Mix) – 3:58
3. "Just a Lover" (Frits Wentink Mix) – 6:25
4. "Just a Lover" (Karma Kid Mix) – 4:58

Remixes 2

1. "Just a Lover" (Caius Mix) – 3:40
2. "Just a Lover" (Petit Biscuit Mix) – 4:56

== Charts ==
Chart (2016)	Peak position
Australian Artist Singles (ARIA Charts)	12
