= Eves Karydas =

Australian singer-songwriter (b. 1994)

- Also known as: Hannah Karydas; Eves; Eves the Behavior
- Born: Hannah Evyenia Karydas; 20 July 1994 (age 32); Cairns, Queensland, Australia
- Genres: Electronica; indie pop; indie rock
- Occupations: Singer; songwriter
- Instruments: Vocals; piano
- Years active: 2009–present
- Label: Dew Process
- Website: eveskarydas.com

Hannah Evyenia Karydas, known professionally as Eves Karydas and formerly Eves the Behavior, is an Australian pop singer-songwriter.

== Early life ==
Hannah Karydas was born in Cairns on 20 July 1994. She was raised there until her family relocated to Brisbane when she was a teenager. Her grandfather was a Greek immigrant who moved to Australia after the Second World War.

== Musical career ==
=== 2009-2013: Career beginnings ===
On 26 July 2009, Karydas released her debut EP Fairytales. In July 2011, she released her second EP, WRITE. On 5 April 2013, she released her single "Scrutinize". On 15 July 2013, she released her single "Heavy", her last appearance under her real name. On 15 September 2013, Karydas released the single "Zen" under her new name Eves.

=== 2014–2016: Eves the Behavior ===
In 2014, Karydas was signed on to the Dew Process label, and revealed her new name Eves The Behavior. She stated "I added Behavior to my name because it gave me the chance to add another connotation to who I am and what I stand for." In 2015, Karydas moved from her home in Brisbane to London to pursue a music career. On 19 January 2015, Karydas released her first single under the Eves The Behavior moniker, "TV". On 17 May 2015, she released her single "Electrical". On 24 July 2015, she released her self-titled EP, Eves The Behavior. On 13 November 2015 she released her single "Girl", her last appearance under the moniker Eves the Behavior.

=== 2017–2019: Summerskin ===
Karydas stayed in London writing and recording new music. On 3 November 2017, she released her first new single "There for You" under her new name Eves Karydas, co-produced by Chris Zane. Eves stated the reason for changing her name was "because [she is] half Greek and it [was] a nice reminder to [her] of where [she] grew up and where [she came] from." In 2018, she supported British singer Dua Lipa on her Australian tour.

On 19 January 2018, she released the single "Further Than the Planes Fly", which later went on to reach Platinum level sales on the ARIA charts. On 18 May, her third single "Couch" was released, a music video followed in July. On 24 August she released her fourth single, "Damn Loyal". In September, Karydas released her debut studio album and announced a 2019 national tour that commenced in February 2019. She supported British artist George Ezra on his 2019 Australian tour.

On 5 February, her fifth single from Summerskin, "Wildest Ones" was released alongside an accompanying music video.

=== 2020–2022: Reruns & Wide Eyed ===
On 4 June 2020, she released her first new single in nearly two years, "Complicated". On 5 August 2021, Karydas announced the release of the EP Reruns and released its fourth single "Lemonade". Karydas released the fifth single of the EP, "Cardboard Box" on 3 September 2021.

In October 2022, Karydas released "Last Night When We Were Young", the lead single from a forthcoming EP, titled Wide Eyed and scheduled for release on 25 November 2022.

=== 2023–present: Burnt Tapes ===
In April 2024, Karydas released "Girlboss" and announced the release of her second studio album, Burnt Tapes.

== Discography ==
=== Studio albums ===
List of studio albums, with selected chart positions
Title	Album details	Peak positions
Title	Album details	AUS
Summerskin	Released: 28 September 2018; Label: Dew Process (DEW9001086)	75
Burnt Tapes	Released: 5 July 2024; Label: Zeitgeist (ZGT001)	23

=== Extended plays ===
List of extended plays, with selected chart positions
Title	EP details
Fairytales (as Hannah Karydas)	Released: 26 July 2009; Label: Independent
Write (as Hannah Karydas)	Released: July 2011; Label: Independent
Eves the Behavior (as Eves the Behavior)	Released: 24 July 2015; Label: Dew Process
Reruns	Released: 24 September 2021; Label: Dew Process, Universal Music Australia
Wide Eyed	Released: 25 November 2022; Label: Dew Process, Universal Music Australia

=== Singles ===
List of singles, with year released, selected certifications and album name shown
Title	Year	Peak chart positions	Certifications	Album
Title	Year	AUS	Certifications	Album
as Hannah Karydas
"Scrutinize"	2013	—		Non-album singles
"Heavy"	2013	—		Non-album singles
as Eves
"Zen"	2013	—		Non-album single
as Eves the Behavior
"TV"	2015	—		Eves the Behavior
"Electrical"	2015	—		Eves the Behavior
"Girl"	2015	—		Non-album single
as Eves Karydas
"There for You"	2017	—		Summerskin
"Further Than the Planes Fly"	2018	— (Note: "Further Than The Planes Fly" did not enter the Top 100, but peaked at number 20 on the Hitseekers Singles Chart.)	ARIA: Platinum	Summerskin
"Couch"	2018	—		Summerskin
"Damn Loyal"	2018	—		Summerskin
"Wildest Ones"	2019	—	ARIA: Gold	Summerskin
"Complicated"	2020	—	ARIA: Gold	Reruns
"Get Me So High"	2020	—		Reruns
"Freckles"	2021	—		Reruns
"Lemonade"	2021	—		Reruns
"Cardboard Box" (featuring Hauskey)	2021	—		Reruns
"Last Night When We Were Young"	2022	—		Wide Eyed
"La La La" (Basenji featuring Eves Karydas)	2022	—		Non-album single
"Sunday Drive"	2024	—		Burnt Tapes
"Girlboss"	2024	—		Burnt Tapes
"Take 2"	2024	—		Burnt Tapes
"Hair Down"	2024	—		Burnt Tapes

=== Other appearances ===
List of non-single guest appearances, with year released and album shown
Title	Year	Album
"(You Make Me Feel Like) A Natural Woman" (Triple J Like a Version)	2018	Like a Version: Volume Fourteen
"Painkiller" (Triple J Like a Version)	2020	Like a Version: Volume Sixteen

== Filmography ==
=== Television ===
List of television appearances, with year released and role shown
Year	Title	Role	Notes	Ref.
2020	The Sound	Herself	Guest appearance; one episode (pre-recorded live performance)	

=== Podcasts ===
List of podcasts, with year released and role shown
Year	Title	Role	Notes	Ref.
2021	Hack	Herself	Guest appearance; one episode	

== Awards and nominations ==
=== Queensland Music Awards ===
The Queensland Music Awards (previously known as Q Song Awards) are an annual award ceremony celebrating Queensland's brightest emerging artists and established legends. They commenced in 2006.

Year	Nominee / work	Award	Result	Ref.
2016	"TV" (directed by Hannah Karydas and Adam Spark)	Video of the Year	Won	
