= My Hands =

Single by Running Touch

from the album Carmine
- Released: 12 July 2018
- Length: 3:41
- Label: Running Touch / Universal Music Australia
- Songwriter(s): Alexander Freund; Running Touch
- Producer(s): Alexander Freund; Running Touch

Running Touch singles chronology
"Equaliser" (2017)	"My Hands" (2018)	"I Give It to You" (2018)

"My Hands" is a song by Australian singer, songwriter and record producer, Running Touch. It was released on 12 July 2018. The song was certified gold in Australia in August 2019.

"This is my first collaborative project in production" speaking on collaborating with Berlin producer Alexander Freund. "I think it's the most natural sound I've committed to up until this point. This started off as a few notes on piano, and grew into something super different sounding in the studio. Lyrically, I wanted to build on a theme that doesn't really stem from a first person or third person point of view. No matter who you are, your hands are your hands, your love is your love. They don't belong to anyone else."

== Track listing ==
1-track single

1. "My Hands" – 3:41

Remixes

1. "My Hands" – 3:41
2. "My Hands" (Adult Art Club remix) – 3:31
3. "My Hands" (Superlove remix) – 6:01
4. "My Hands" (The Journey remix) – 08:08

== Certifications ==
Region	Certification	Certified units/sales
Australia (ARIA)	Platinum	70,000^{‡}
^{‡} Sales+streaming figures based on certification alone.

== Release history ==
Region	Date	Format(s)	Label
Australia	12 July 2018	digital download; streaming	Running Touch / Universal Music Australia
Australia	9 August 2018	digital download; streaming	Running Touch / Universal Music Australia
