= Running Touch =

Australian musician

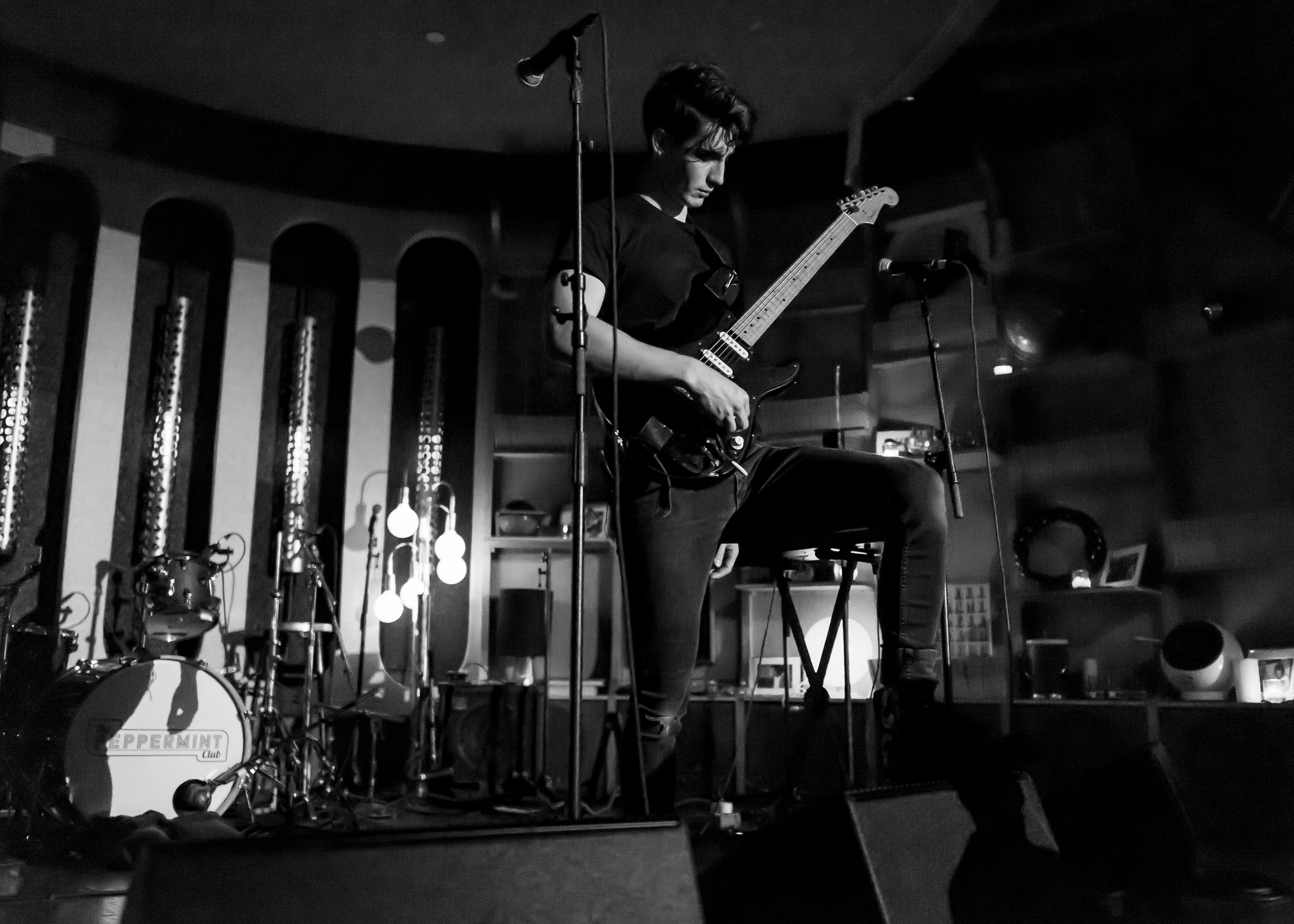

Background information
- Born: Matthew Victor Kopp
- Origin: Melbourne, Australia
- Genres: Dance; experimental; electronica; nu metal
- Occupations: Producer; musician
- Instruments: Vocals; guitar
- Years active: 2010–present
- Label: Island
- Member of: Ocean Grove, Adult Art Club
- Website: runningtouch.com

Matthew Victor Kopp, who performs as Running Touch, is an Australian singer, songwriter and record producer. In addition to his eponymous solo project, he was the founding guitarist of Australian nu metal band Ocean Grove in 2010, and since 2014 he is a studio-only member. He is also half of the electronic dance duo Adult Art Club.

== Career ==
Running Touch's debut extended play, A Body Slow, was issued in April 2017 via Island Records Australia/Universal Music Australia, which peaked at No. 31 on the ARIA Digital Albums Chart and No. 1 on the related Hitseekers Albums Chart. Kopp explained to Benjamin Potter of Beat magazine, his use of a pseudonym, "at the start it was all about a personal decision – I didn't want the project to be based on... what I look like, who I am, my past... I didn't think Running Touch was going to be so successful." His single, "My Hands" (July 2018), which reached No. 12 on the ARIA Club Tracks Chart, was certified gold by ARIA for shipment of 35000 units in Australia, in August 2019.

In November 2018 he was featured on the single, "Better Together", by Hayden James. The track reached No. 63 on the ARIA Singles Chart, placed number 78 in that year's Triple J Hottest 100. At the APRA Music Awards of 2020 Running Touch (as Matthew Kopp) won Most Performed Dance Work of the Year for "Better Together", which he co-wrote.

In February 2022 Running Touch announced his debut album, Carmine, was scheduled for 6 May.

== Discography ==
=== Studio albums ===
List of studio albums, with release date and label shown
Title	Details
Carmine	Scheduled: 6 May 2022; Label: Running Touch, Universal Music Australia (5715356); Format: LP, digital download, streaming

=== Extended plays ===
List of EPs, with release date and label shown
Title	Details	Peak chart positions
Title	Details	AUS
A Body Slow	Released: 31 May 2017; Label: Running Touch, Universal Music Australia (5715356); Format: Digital download, media streaming	— (Note: A Body Slow did not enter the ARIA Albums Chart, but did peak at number 31 on the ARIA Digital Albums Chart.)

=== Singles ===
==== As lead artist ====
List of singles, with year released, selected chart positions, and album name shown
Title	Year	Peak chart positions		Certifications	Album
Title	Year	AUS	NZ Hot	Certifications	Album
"This Is Just to Say"	2015	—	—		Non-album singles
"What's Best for You"	2016	—	—		Non-album singles
"Post Modern"	2016	—	—		Non-album singles
"Courtesy Of"	2016	—	—		A Body Slow
"Aubrey" (featuring Ira Horace)	2016	—	—		A Body Slow
"Lovely"	2017	—	—		A Body Slow
"Levitate (It's All Too Perfect)"	2017	—	—		Non-album singles
"Equaliser" (featuring I.H)	2017	—	—		Non-album singles
"My Hands"	2018	— (Note: "My Hands" did not enter the ARIA Singles Chart, but the Superlover / Adult Art Club / The Journey mix did peak at number 12 on the ARIA Club Tracks Chart.)	—	ARIA: Platinum	Carmine
"When I'm Around You"	2019	—	22	ARIA: Platinum	Non-album singles
"Make Your Move"	2019	—	—	ARIA: Gold	Non-album singles
"Meet Me"	2020	—	—		Carmine
"Signs"	2020	—	—		Carmine
"Juno"	2021	—	—		Carmine
"Ceilings"	2021	—	—		Carmine
"Come with Me"	2022	—	—		Carmine
"Why Do I?"	2022	—	—		Carmine
"Lost"	2024	—	—		TBA
"I Can't Wait All Night"	2024	—	—		TBA
"Meant to Be" (with Paraleven)	2024	—	—		TBA
"Follow" (with Durante)	2025	—	—		TBA
"Capri"	2026	—	—		TBA
"Through the Roof"	2026	—	—		TBA
"Crushed"	2026	—	—		TBA

==== As featured artist ====
List of singles, with year released, selected chart positions and certifications, and album name shown
Title	Year	Peak chart positions		Album
Title	Year	AUS	NZ Hot	Album
"Thunderdome" (Ocean Grove featuring Running Touch)	2017	—	—	The Rhapsody Tapes
"05 Gwen" (Adult Art Club featuring Running Touch)	2018	—	—	Non-album singles
"I Give It to You" (Verboten Berlin featuring Running Touch)	2018	—	—	Non-album singles
"Better Together" (Hayden James featuring Running Touch)	2018	63	22	Between Us
"Fever" (Jerro featuring Running Touch)	2024	—	—	Non-album single

== Awards ==
=== APRA Awards ===
The APRA Awards are held in Australia and New Zealand by the Australasian Performing Right Association to recognise songwriting skills, sales and airplay performance by its members annually. Running Touch has been nominated for one award (with Hayden James).

Year	Nominee / work	Award	Result
2020	"Better Together" (with Hayden James)	Most Performed Dance Work of the Year	Won
