= Something About You (Hayden James song) =

Single by Hayden James
- Released: 19 December 2014
- Recorded: 2014
- Genre: Electronic
- Length: 3:43
- Label: Future Classic
- Songwriters: Alexander Burnett; Jessica Higgs; Hayden Luby

Hayden James singles chronology
"Embrace" (2013)	"Something About You" (2014)	"Just a Lover" (2016)

Music video
- "Something About You" on YouTube

"Something About You" is a song by Australian record producer Hayden James, It was released on 19 December 2014 via the Teen Idols: A Future Classic Compilation. The one-track digital single was released on 22 May 2015 and remixes were released on 21 August 2015. The track was also released in the US via Casablanca Records.

The song was nominated for Best Dance Release at the ARIA Music Awards of 2015, but lost to "You Were Right" by Rüfüs.

== Background ==
In an interview with Mike Wass from Idolator, James said he wrote the song in two or three hours in 2014, however, the song took weeks to produce. He first played the song to Rüfüs and asked for their opinion. He said it is his voice in the chorus and a blend of his and George Maple's in the verses. James added "It made sense to me to write a song and not a dance track. I'm way more into soulful stuff. I'm actually making a song and I can get other people to remix it into something crazy if they want."

== Music video ==
The official music video was released on 27 May 2015.

== Track listing ==
Digital download

1. "Something About You" – 3:43

Digital download (remixes)

1. "Something About You" (Extended Mix) – 5:26
2. "Something About You" (Odesza Remix) – 5:41
3. "Something About You" (SpectraSoul Remix) – 4:40
4. "Something About You" (Just Kiddin Remix) – 5:00
5. "Something About You" (Ben Pearce Remix) – 6:01
6. "Something About You" (Charles Webster Club Mix) – 7:59
7. "Something About You" (Gazzo Remix) – 4:38

== Charts ==
Chart (2015)	Peak position
Australia (ARIA)	46
Australian Independent Singles (AIR)	4
France (SNEP)	39
Germany (GfK)	90
Italy (FIMI)	50

== Certifications ==
Region	Certification	Certified units/sales
Australia (ARIA)	Gold	35,000^{^}
New Zealand (RMNZ)	2× Platinum	60,000^{‡}
United Kingdom (BPI)	Silver	200,000^{‡}
^{^} Shipments figures based on certification alone.^{‡} Sales+streaming figures based on certification alone.
