= Graace =

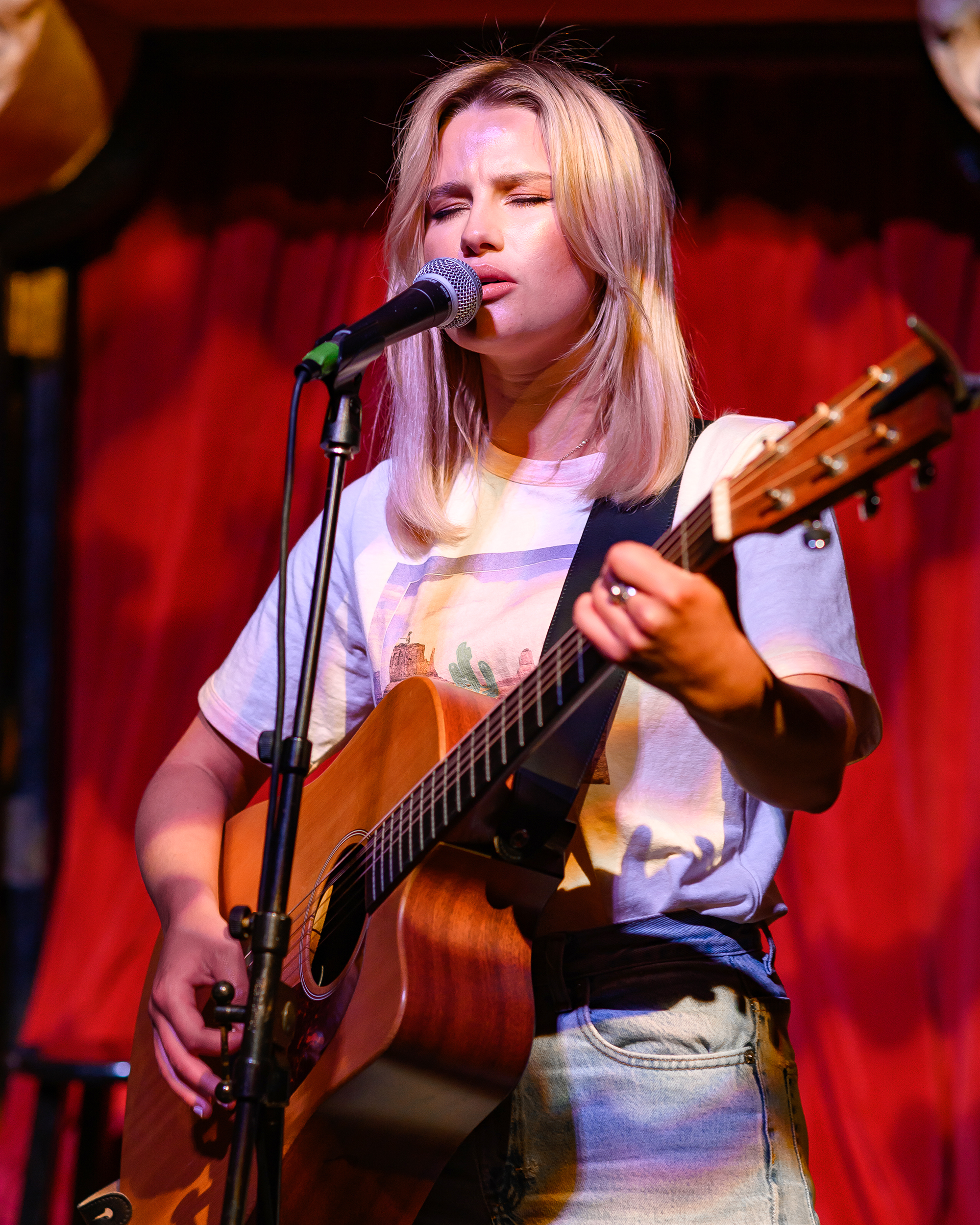
- Graace in February 2019

Background information
- Born: Grace Pitts; Sydney
- Origin: Sydney, Australia
- Occupations: Singer; songwriter
- Years active: 2015–present
- Label: Sony Music Australia

Grace Pitts, better known as Graace, is an Australian singer-songwriter from Sydney. She is best known for her vocals on Hayden James' platinum selling single "Numb". It was released in October 2017.

== Career ==
=== 2015–2016: The Voice ===
In 2015, Pitt auditioned for season four of The Voice Australia, with the song "Jolene" and joined team Delta Goodrem.

The Voice performances and results (2015)
Episode	Song	Original Artist	Result
Audition	"Jolene"	Dolly Parton	Through to battle rounds
Battle Rounds	"Blank Space"	Taylor Swift	Through to super battle round
Super Battle Rounds	"Boom Clap"	Charli XCX	Eliminated in 16th-32nd place

=== 2017–2018: Self Sabotage ===
Graace first come to media attention co-writing and featuring on Hayden James' "Numb", which was released in October 2017. The song was certified platinum in Australia and showcased her vocals. In 2018 Graace joined Flight Facilities as a touring vocalist on their "The Return Flight" tour, playing shows across Australia, North America, Europe and New Zealand.

In May 2018, Graace released her debut solo single "Kissing Boys". In September 2018, it was announced that Graace had signed with Sony Music Australia and released "Last Night". Her debut extended play Self Sabotage was released in October 2018 followed by a third and final single from the EP "SOS" in November 2018.

=== 2019–2022: Self Preservation ===
On 17 May 2019, Graace released "Have Fun at Your Party". On 23 August 2019, Graace released "21st Century Love". On 13 December 2019, Graace released "Overthink".

On 1 October 2021, Graace released "Sentimental", a song Graace said serves as a "letter to my past self".

In November 2021, Graace released "Half Awake" and announced that her second EP, Self Preservation, would be released in February 2022. In an interview with Women in Pop, Graace said "[It is] literally the polar opposite to [debut EP] Self Sabotage. I think my growth in those three years was pretty immense emotionally. I love this EP so much because it's not just about heartbreak, I've finally been able to write about my father and things that are really, really personal."

=== 2024: After Image ===
In March 2024, Graace released "Jealous Type", her first new music in two years. In June 2024, Graace announced her third EP After Image. Graace said "Just as an afterimage is the lingering impression of an object seen after closing your eyes, Afterimage captures the essence of carrying past relationships into new experiences, incorporating the lessons, heartbreak, and love from those encounters". Poppy Reid from Rolling Stone Australia gave the album 3 out of 5 stars, saying "The Sydney artist's latest work proves girlhood can be witty, naive, bold and toxic all at once."

== Discography ==
=== Extended plays ===
Title	Details
Self Sabotage	Released: 26 October 2018; Label: Graace, Sony Australia (19075894841); Format: Digital download, streaming, 12" vinyl
Self Preservation	Released: 11 February 2022; Label: Sony Australia; Format: Digital download, streaming
After Image	Scheduled: 16 August 2024; Label: Sony Australia; Format: Digital download, streaming

=== Singles ===
==== As lead artist ====
List of singles as lead artist, with selected chart positions and certifications shown
Title	Year	Peak chart positions		Certifications	Album
Title	Year	AUS	NZ Hot	Certifications	Album
"Kissing Boys"	2018	—	—		Self Sabotage
"Last Night"	2018	—	—	ARIA: Gold	Self Sabotage
"SOS"	2018	—	—		Self Sabotage
"Have Fun at Your Party"	2019	—	—		TBA
"21st Century Love"	2019	—	33		TBA
"Overthink"	2019	—	—		TBA
"Complicated" (Triple J Like a Version)	2020	—	—		Like a Version: Volume Sixteen
"Hard to Say" (featuring I.E.)	2020	—	33		TBA
"Body Language"	2020	—	—		TBA
"You Do You"	2020	—	—		TBA
"Sentimental"	2021	—	—		Self Preservation
"Hall Awake"	2021	—	—		Self Preservation
"Selfish"	2022	—	—		Self Preservation
"Jealous Type"	2024	—	—		After Image
"Love Is Getting Wasted"	2024	—	—		After Image
"Her"	2024	—	—		After Image
"Honey"	2024	—	—		After Image
"Downgraded"	2024	—	—		After Image
"—" denotes a recording that did not chart or was not released in that territory.

==== As featured artist ====
List of singles as featured artist, with selected chart positions and certifications shown
Title	Year	Peak chart positions	Certifications	Album
Title	Year	AUS	Certifications	Album
"Numb" (Hayden James featuring Graace)	2017	48	ARIA: 3× Platinum; RMNZ: Platinum	Between Us

==== Other appearances ====
Title	Year	Album
"Hold On, We're Going Home" (Xavier Dunn featuring Graace)	2021	Bimyou Two
