= Nicky Night Time =

Australian pop musician

Nicky Night Time (real name Nick Routledge) is an Australian pop musician.

Nicky Night Time's single "Everybody Together" reached number 1 on the ARIA Club Chart and at the ARIA Music Awards of 2014, was nominated for Best Dance Release.

Nicky was a member of the electropop band Van She, where he sometimes went by the name Nicky Van She.

He is also a member of duo Naations with Nat Dunn.

== Discography ==
=== Singles ===
List of singles, showing year
Title	Year
"California" with Dangerous Dan)	2014
"Everybody Together" with Dangerous Dan)	2014
"Gonna Get Better" featuring Nat Dunn)	2015
"Flowers" featuring Nat Dunn)	2015
"Careful Baby" featuring Antony and Cleopatra)	2016
"Lose Control" with Kaz James)	2016
"Give it Up" with Kaz James)	2016
"Lonely Nights" with Cut Snake)	2018
"A History" with Dangerous Dan, Rhonda INTL featuring Julian Mitchell)	2019
"Psychology of a DJ" with Beni)	2019
"My Own Isolation" with Vctoriahhh)	2020
"Like I Dont Exist"	2020
"Ubiquity" with Ali Love)	2021

== Awards ==
=== AIR Awards ===
The Australian Independent Record Awards (commonly known informally as AIR Awards) is an annual awards night to recognise, promote and celebrate the success of Australia's Independent Music sector.

Year	Nominee / work	Award	Result
2015	"Gonna Get Better" (with Nat Dunn)	Best Independent Dance/Electronic Club Song or EP	Nominated

=== ARIA Music Awards ===
The ARIA Music Awards is an annual awards ceremony that recognises excellence, innovation, and achievement across all genres of Australian music.

Year	Nominee / work	Award	Result
2014	"Everybody Together"	Best Dance Release	Nominated
