= Nat Dunn =

Australian singer-songwriter

Natalie Maree Dunn
- Origin: Queensland, Australia
- Genres: Pop; dance; rock
- Occupation: Singer-songwriter
- Labels: Mushroom Group, EMI Records
- Member of: Naations

Natalie Dunn is an Australian singer-songwriter from Queensland.

== Early life ==
Natalie Dunn is from Queensland.

== Career ==
Primarily a songwriter, Dunn has gained fame for writing for artists like Marshmello, Anne-Marie, Kygo, Rita Ora, Hayden James, Duke Dumont, and Charli XCX, among others. She had a major success with the song "FRIENDS" performed by Anne-Marie & Marshmello, which peaked at Number 11 on the Billboard Top 100 in the summer of 2018 and surpassed 1 Billion views on YouTube. Dunn also worked on "Carry On" (performed by Rita Ora and Kygo) for the 2019 film Detective Pikachu. The song peaked at number three on the ARIA Dance Singles chart in May 2019.

In June 2019, Dunn was honoured by APRA AMCOS for her contribution to "FRIENDS" after amassing more than one billion streams. Dunn was the first to be added to the society's new club, which recognises Australian songwriters for their contribution to streaming hits.

In 2022, Dunn co-wrote "Tally" on Blackpink's highly anticipated sophomore album Born Pink, which debuted at number one on the U.S. and U.K. album charts.

Dunn is also a part of the duo Naations, with Nicky Night Time, who released the U.K. radio single "Real Life" with Duke Dumont. Dunn is also signed to EMI Records for her own solo project.

In 2020, Dunn opened her own company, Mutual Muse Group, as creative space to help curate and advise on other artist projects which include artist like JoJo, Paloma Faith, and exceptional development acts.

She has released records on the Mushroom label.

== Discography ==
=== Extended plays ===
Title	EP details
A Fool's Fate	Released: December 2013; Formats: CD, digital download; Label: Independent release

=== Singles ===
==== As lead artist ====
List of singles released as lead artist
Title	Year	Peak chart positions		Album
Title	Year	AUS	NZ Hot	Album
Credited as Tali
"Whatever"	2001	32	—	non album singles
"Don't Be Sorry"	2001	85	—	non album singles
Credited as Nat Dunn
"Trigger"	2013	—	—	A Fool's Fate
"Fool's Fate"	2013	—	—	A Fool's Fate
"Looking for Love" (with Nick Martin)	2016	—	—	non album single
"Favours" (with Hayden James)	2019	—	23	Between Us (Hayden James album)
"Foolproof" (with Hayden James & Gorgon City)	2021	—	33	TBA
"The Last Time"	2023	—	—	TBA

==== As featured artist ====
List of singles, with selected chart positions
Title	Year	Album
"I Don't Think That You Know" (Mr.Timothy featuring Nat Dunn)	2007	non album single
"Ready to Go" (Urthboy featuring Nat Dunn)	2009	Spitshine
"Hyperlove" (Ferry Corsten featuring Nat Dunn)	2014	non album single
"Gonna Get Better" (Nicky Night Time featuring Nat Dunn)	2015	non album single
"Feel the Love" (Tigerlily featuring Nat Dunn)	2015	non album single
"Flowers" (Nicky Night Time featuring Nat Dunn)	2015	non album single
"Overdose" (Two Friends & Exit Friendzone featuring Nat Dunn)	2016	non album single
"One Step At a Time" (Bearson featuring Nat Dunn)	2016	non album single
"Touch the Ground" (Corey Enemy, SYRE featuring Nat Dunn)	2017	non album single

=== Other appearances ===
List of other non-single song appearances
Title	Year	Album
"Ready to Go" (Urthboy featuring Nat Dunn)	2009	Spitshine
"Learning" (Miracle featuring Allday & Nat Dunn)	2014	Mainland
"The Experts" (Good Oak featuring Nat Dunn)	2015	Public Service
"Bad" (Drapht featuring Nat Dunn)	2016	Seven Mirrors
"What We've Become" (GRiZ, Cory Enemy featuring Nat Dunn)	2016	Good Will Prevail
"Run for Your Life" (Mako (DJ), Rat City featuring Nat Dunn)	2016	Hourglass
"Sleep on It" (Busby Marou featuring Nat Dunn)	2017	Postcards from the Shell House
"Golden Touch" (NVOY featuring Nat Dunn)	2017	Aurum
"Holiday Love" (Lee Groves featuring Nat Dunn)	2017	A Season for Peace
"Tempt Fate!" (Teddy featuring Nat Dunn)	2019	Teddy

== Awards and nominations ==
=== AIR Awards ===
The Australian Independent Record Awards (commonly known informally as AIR Awards) is an annual awards night to recognise, promote and celebrate the success of Australia's Independent Music sector.

Year	Nominee / work	Award	Result	Ref.
2015	"Gonna Get Better" (with Nicky Night Time)	Best Independent Dance/Electronic Club Song or EP	Nominated	

=== ARIA Music Awards ===
The ARIA Music Awards is an annual award ceremony event celebrating the Australian music industry.

Year	Nominee / work	Award	Result	Ref.
2023	Matt Corby, Chris Collins, Nat Dunn, Alex Henrikssen for Matt Corby – Everything's Fine	Best Produced Release	Nominated	

=== Queensland Music Awards ===
The Queensland Music Awards (previously known as Q Song Awards) are annual awards celebrating Queensland, Australia's brightest emerging artists and established legends. They commenced in 2006.

Year	Nominee / work	Award	Result (wins only)	Ref.
2020	herself	Export Achievement Award	awarded	
2022	"Foolproof" (with Hayden James and Gorgon City)	Electronic / Dance Award of the Year	Won	
2022	"Foolproof" (with Hayden James and Gorgon City)	Regional / Remote Award	Won	

== Songwriting credits ==
- John Course & Goodwill - "I Don't Think That You Know" (Electro Funk Lovers Remix) (2007)
- Good Oak - "Provider" (2013)
- Dami Im - "Heart So Dry" (2014)
- Skylar Stecker - "Boomerang" (2015)
- Chris Brown - "No Filter" (2015)
- G.R.L. - "Are We Good" (2016)
- Tkay Maidza - "Afterglow", "House of Cards", "State Of Mind" (2016)
- Tiesto - "No Worries" (2017)
- R3HAB & Quintino – "I Just Can't" (2017)
- The Potbelleez – "Show Me Where Your Love Is" (2017)
- Jasmine Thompson – "Old Friends" (2017)
- Charli XCX - "5 in the Morning" (2018)
- Marshmello, Anne-Marie - "Friends (Marshmello and Anne-Marie song)" (2018)
- Kygo, Rita Ora - "Carry On (Kygo and Rita Ora song)" (2019)
- Ella Henderson - "Glorious" (2019)
- Anne-Marie - "Her" (2020)
- Blackpink - "Tally" (2022)
- Ive - "My Satisfaction" (2022)
- Twice - "Gone" (2022)
