= Better Together (Hayden James song) =

Single by Hayden James featuring Running Touch

from the album Between Us
- Released: 2 November 2018
- Length: 3:56
- Label: Future Classic
- Songwriter(s): Hayden Luby; Cassian Stewart-Kasima; Matthew Kopp; Jack Glass
- Producer(s): Hayden James; Running Touch; Cassian

Hayden James singles chronology
"Just Friends" (2018)	"Better Together" (2018)	"Nowhere to Go" (2019)

Running Touch singles chronology
"I Give It to You" (2018)	"Better Together" (2018)	"When I'm Around You" (2019)

"Better Together" is a song by Australian singer Hayden James featuring Australian producer Running Touch. It was released on 2 November 2018 as the third single from James' debut studio album Between Us (2019). The song has peaked at number 63 on the ARIA Singles Chart. James told Ben and Liam on Triple J: "It's about holding on to someone that's special."

At the APRA Music Awards of 2020, "Better Together" won the Most Performed Dance Work of the Year.

== Critical reception ==
Hayden Davies from PileRats said "It's a summery sun-soaked anthem with a bright house backbone, combining Hayden James' signature pop-house pulse with Running Touch's masterful vocal, which adds a sensual, pop-centric twist to the single's masterful sound."

== Track listing ==
Digital download

1. "Better Together" – 3:56

Digital download

1. "Better Together" (Happiness is Wealth Disco remix) – 6:09

Digital download

1. "Better Together" (Offaiah remix) - 6:55
2. "Better Together" (Offaiah remix radio edit) - 3:33

== Charts ==
=== Weekly charts ===
Chart (2018–19)	Peak position
Australia (ARIA)	63

=== Year-end charts ===
Chart (2019)	Position
Australian Artist (ARIA)	33
