= Just Friends (Hayden James song) =

Single by Hayden James featuring Boy Matthews

from the album Between Us
- Released: 27 April 2018
- Length: 3:58
- Label: Future Classic
- Songwriters: Hayden Luby; James Norton
- Producers: Hayden James; Cassian

Hayden James singles chronology
"Numb" (2017)	"Just Friends" (2018)	"Better Together" (2018)

Boy Matthews singles chronology
"Just Friends" (2018)

Music video
- "Just Friends" on YouTube

"Just Friends" is a song by Australian singer Hayden James featuring Boy Matthews. It was released on 27 April 2018 as the second single from James' debut studio album Between Us (2019). The song has peaked at number 26 on the ARIA Singles Chart, becoming James' highest-charting single.

== Critical reception ==
Robin Murray from Clash Music called the song "stellar" saying "The fresh-sounding synth foundation builds into an imposing structure, the nuanced arrangement affording room for that powerful, propulsive vocal. There are shades of Chet Faker or even Disclosure here, a pop-edged underground sound making it on its own terms." Julia Brodnick said "It's super catchy and has me dancing around with its pop-tinges and addictive melodies. Featuring vocals from Boy Matthews that really brings the song to competition, this tune is a perfect one to vibe out with." Amnplify said "[it] is an infectious four-minutes of pitched-down soulful harmonies, driving bass lines and direct vocals from Boy Matthews – all wrapped within Hayden's signature twist of alluring momentum and rolling grooves."

== Track listing ==
Digital download

1. "Just Friends" – 3:58

Digital download

1. "Just Friends" (Paul Woodford remix) – 6:50
2. "Just Friends" (Paul Woodford dub) – 5:17

Digital download

1. "Just Friends" (Mat Joe remix) – 3:01

== Charts ==
=== Weekly charts ===
Chart (2018)	Peak position
Australia (ARIA)	26
Australian Artist Singles (ARIA)	4

=== Year-end charts ===
Chart (2018)	Position
Australia (ARIA)	86
Australian Artist (ARIA)	8
Chart (2019)	Position
Australian Artist (ARIA)	23

== Certifications ==
Region	Certification	Certified units/sales
Australia (ARIA)	Platinum	70,000^{‡}
New Zealand (RMNZ)	Platinum	30,000^{‡}
^{‡} Sales+streaming figures based on certification alone.
