= Hayden James =

Australian musician (born 1985)

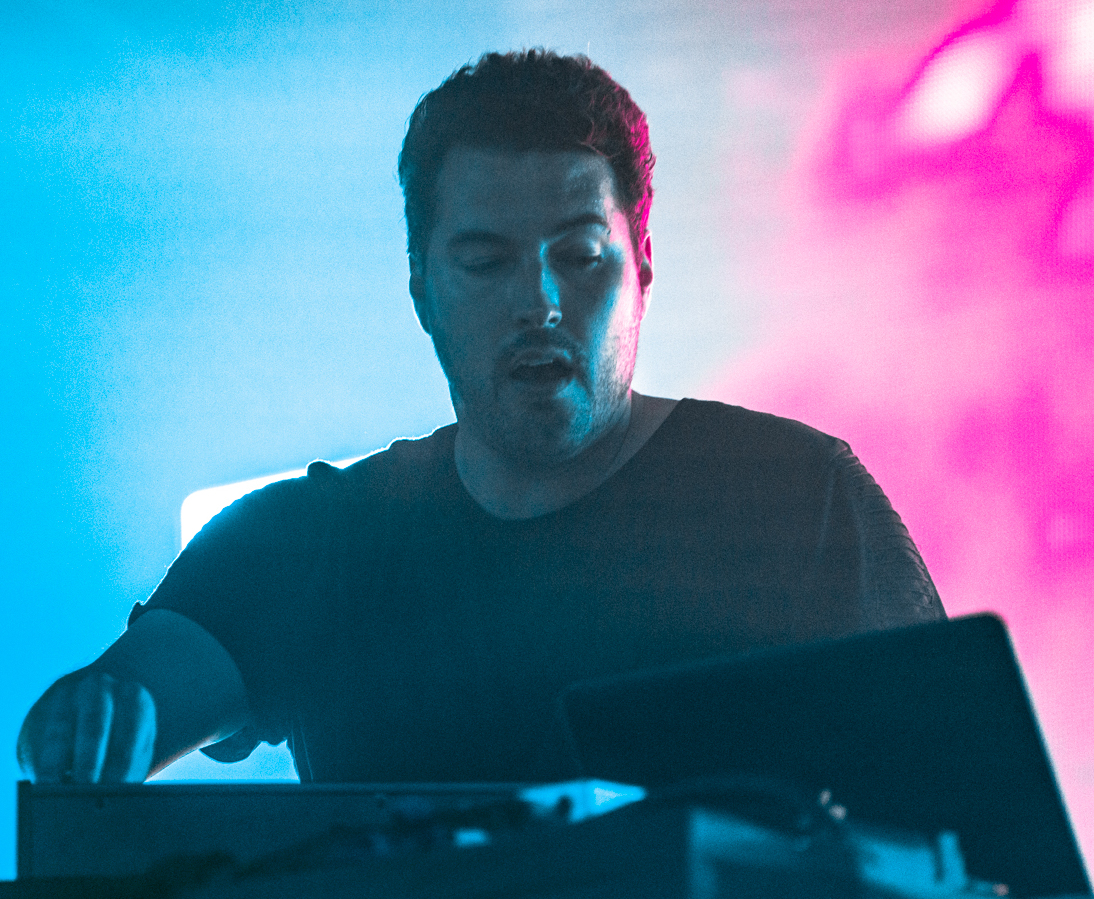
- James performing in 2018

Background information
- Born: 16 August 1985 (age 41); Melbourne, Victoria, Australia
- Genre: House
- Occupation: DJ · songwriter · record producer
- Years active: 2013–present
- Label: Future Classic
- Website: haydenjamesmusic.com

Hayden James is an Australian DJ, songwriter and record producer from Sydney. He is signed to the Future Classic label. As for 2026, he has released three studio albums.

== Career ==
=== 2013–2018: Hayden James ===
James released his first single "Permission to Love" in June 2013 with remixes from label mates Touch Sensitive and Charles Murdoch.

His debut EP, Hayden James was released on 30 August 2013. Since then, James has supported Disclosure and Odesza on their US and Australian tours. He has also played at major Australian music festivals Splendour in the Grass and Groovin The Moo.

His single "Something About You" was released in December 2014 and was certified gold in Australia and has been streamed over 68 million times.

In June 2016, James released "Just a Lover" which received an ARIA nomination for Best Dance Release and was followed by a national tour with producer Dena Amy as a support.

In 2016–2017, James toured across Europe and North America and co-wrote a number of tracks for Katy Perry's Witness album, as well as working on his own debut studio album. "Numb" featuring Graace was released in October 2017.

=== 2019–2022: Between Us and Lifted ===
In May 2019, James announced he would release his debut studio album Between Us on 14 June 2019.

James released his second studio album, Lifted, on 8 April 2022.

=== 2024: We Could Be Love ===
In July 2023, James released "Do You Want Me" with Bob Moses.

On 16 August 2024, James released "All In" and announced the release of his third studio album We Could Be Love, released on 13 September 2024.

== Personal life ==
Hayden James is married to Sydney artist Jennifer Lia. They have a residence at Manhattan Beach in Los Angeles. James became a father in 2020.

== Discography ==
=== Studio albums ===
List of studio albums, with selected chart positions shown
Title	Details	Peak chart positions
Title	Details	AUS
Between Us	Released: 14 June 2019; Label: Future Classic (FCL 262); Format: CD, LP, digital download, streaming	9
Lifted	Released: 8 April 2022; Label: Future Classic (FCL 456); Format: CD, LP, digital download, streaming	68
We Could Be Love	Released: 13 September 2024; Label: Future Classic (FCL 649); Format: CD, LP, digital download, streaming	— (Note: We Could Be Love did not enter the ARIA top 100, but peaked at number three on the Australian Artist Dance Chart.)

=== Compilation albums ===
List of compilation albums, with release date and label shown
Title	Details
Hayden James Presents Waves of Gold (DJ Mix)	Released: 10 July 2020; Label: Future Classic; Formats: Digital download, streaming

=== Extended plays ===
List of extended plays, with selected chart positions shown
Title	Details	Peak chart positions
Title	Details	AUS AIR
Hayden James	Released: 30 August 2013; Label: Future Classic (FCL 88); Formats: CD, LP, digital download	17
Triple J Live at the Wireless	Released: 31 July 2020; Label: ABC; Formats: digital download, streaming	—

=== Singles ===
List of singles, with selected chart positions and certifications shown
Title	Year	Peak chart positions						Certifications	Album
Title	Year	AUS	AUS AIR	FRA	GER	ITA	NZ Hot	Certifications	Album
"Permission to Love"	2013	—	7	—	—	—	—		Hayden James
"Embrace"	2013	—	—	—	—	—	—		Hayden James
"Something About You"	2014	46	4	39	90	50	—	ARIA: Gold; RMNZ: 2× Platinum	Non-album singles
"Just a Lover" (featuring George Maple)	2016	—	5	—	—	—	—		Non-album singles
"Numb" (featuring Graace)	2017	48	2	—	—	—	—	ARIA: 3× Platinum; RMNZ: Platinum	Between Us
"Just Friends" (featuring Boy Matthews)	2018	26	2	—	—	—	— (Note: "Just Friends" did not enter the NZ Top 40 Singles Chart or the NZ Hot Singles Chart, but peaked at number five on the NZ Heatseeker Singles Chart.)	ARIA: Platinum; RMNZ: Platinum	Between Us
"Better Together" (featuring Running Touch)	2018	63	2	—	—	—	22		Between Us
"Nowhere to Go" (with Naations)	2019	—	4	—	—	—	26		Between Us
"Favours" (with Nat Dunn)	2019	—	19	—	—	—	23		Between Us
"Right Time" (with Icona Pop)	2020	—	—	—	—	—	—		Non-album single
"Waves of Gold" (with Azteck featuring Paije)	2020	—	—	—	—	—	—		Waves of Gold
"Foolproof" (with Gorgon City and Nat Dunn)	2021	—	7	—	—	—	33		Olympia
"Rather Be with You" (featuring Crooked Colours)	2021	—	—	—	—	—	—		Non-album single
"Waiting for Nothing" (featuring Yaeger)	2021	—	—	—	—	—	—		Lifted
"Hold Tight"	2022	—	—	—	—	—	—		Lifted
"On Your Own" (with Cassian featuring Elderbrook)	2022	—	—	—	—	—	—		Lifted
"Lights Go Down" (with Sidepiece)	2022	—	—	—	—	—	34		Lifted
"Good Life" (featuring Emie)	2022	—	—	—	—	—	—		Non-album single
"Do You Want Me" (with Bob Moses)	2023	—	—	—	—	—	—		TBA
"We Could Be Love" (with AR/CO)	2023	—	—	—	—	—	—		We Could Be Love
"Beggin' You" (with Saygrace)	2023	—	—	—	—	—	—		TBA
"Different Worlds" (with Anabel Englund)	2024	—	—	—	—	—	—		TBA
"Make It" (with Kormak)	2024	—	—	—	—	—	—		We Could Be Love
"Deep Diving" (with Shells)	2024	—	—	—	—	—	—		We Could Be Love
"Patience" (with Karen Harding)	2024	—	—	—	—	—	—		We Could Be Love
"All In"	2024	—	—	—	—	—	—		We Could Be Love
"Follow Me" (featuring Sumner)	2025	—	—	—	—	—	—		
"One I Want" (featuring Kormak and Yeah Boy)	2026	—	—	—	—	—	—		
"For the Girls" (featuring Bipolar Sunshine)	2026	—	—	—	—	—	—		
"Here and Now" (with Maria Hazell)	2026	—	—	—	—	—	—		
"In My Dreams" (with Loods)	2026	—	—	—	—	—	—		
"—" denotes a recording that did not chart or was not released.

== Awards and nominations ==
=== AIR Awards ===
The Australian Independent Record Awards (commonly known informally as AIR Awards) is an annual awards night to recognise, promote and celebrate the success of Australia's Independent Music sector.

Year	Nominee / work	Award	Result
2015	"Something About You"	Best Independent Dance/Electronic Club Song or EP	Won

=== APRA Awards ===
The APRA Awards are held in Australia and New Zealand by the Australasian Performing Right Association to recognise songwriting skills, sales and airplay performance by its members annually. James has won an award from one nominations.

Year	Nominee / work	Award	Result
2020	"Better Together" (James with Matthew Kopp, Jack Glass and Cassian Stewart-Kasimba)	Most Performed Dance Work of the Year	Won

=== ARIA Music Awards ===
The ARIA Music Awards are a set of annual awards ceremonies, which recognises excellence, innovation, and achievement across all genres of Australian music. James has received three nominations.

Year	Nominee / work	Award	Result
2015	"Something About You"	Best Dance Release	Nominated
2016	"Just a Lover"	Best Dance Release	Nominated
2019	Between Us	Best Male Artist	Nominated

=== J Award ===
The J Awards are an annual series of Australian music awards that were established by the Australian Broadcasting Corporation's youth-focused radio station Triple J. They commenced in 2005.

Year	Nominee / work	Award	Result
2019	Between Us	Australian Album of the Year	Nominated

=== MTV Europe Music Awards ===
The MTV Europe Music Awards is an award presented by Viacom International Media Networks to honour artists and music in pop culture.

Year	Nominee / work	Award	Result
2020	Himself	Best Australian Act	Nominated

=== Queensland Music Awards ===
The Queensland Music Awards (previously known as Q Song Awards) are annual awards celebrating Queensland, Australia's brightest emerging artists and established legends. They commenced in 2006.

Year	Nominee / work	Award	Result (wins only)	Ref.
2022	"Foolproof" (with Nat Dunn and Gorgon City)	Electronic / Dance Award of the Year	Won	
2022	"Foolproof" (with Nat Dunn and Gorgon City)	Regional / Remote Award	Won	
