= Triple J's Hottest 100 of 2019 =

Most popular songs of the year in Australia

2019 Triple J Hottest 100

Countdown details
- Date of countdown: 25 January
- Charity partner: Greening Australia
- Votes cast: 3,211,596

Countdown highlights
- Winning song: Billie Eilish "Bad Guy"
- Most entries: Billie Eilish (5 tracks)

Chronology
← Previous; 2018	Next → 2010s

The 2019 Triple J Hottest 100 was announced on 25 January 2020. It is the 27th countdown of the most popular songs of the year, as chosen by listeners of Australian radio station Triple J. A record-breaking number of votes (3.21 million) were cast by listeners choosing their top ten songs of 2019. This was the first Hottest 100 countdown to reach 3 million votes.

American singer-songwriter Billie Eilish was voted into first place with her single "Bad Guy". In doing so, she became the first female solo artist, and the youngest act (at 18 years old) to top a Hottest 100. Eilish also achieved the second most entries in the countdown, at five, second only to Wolfmother who had 6 in 2005. Australian artists G Flip and Lime Cordiale achieved four entires each.

A number of Hottest 100 records were also broken. Denzel Curry's cover of "Bulls on Parade" became the highest ranking Like a Version (and equal highest cover) in any Hottest 100. Slipknot's single "Unsainted" broke the record for the longest absence between countdowns, having last appeared 19 years prior with "Wait and Bleed" in the 2000 countdown.

== Background ==
The Triple J Hottest 100 allows members of the public to vote online for their top ten songs of the year, which are then used to calculate the year's 100 most popular songs. Any song initially released between 1 December 2018 and 30 November 2019 was eligible for 2019's Hottest 100.

Voting opened on 16 December 2019. Many artists and presenters made their votes public—out of 23 Triple J presenters, the artists they voted for most often were Julia Jacklin, Sampa the Great, and Thelma Plum.

=== Projections ===
Prior to the countdown, three favourites had emerged by a significant margin. Bookmaker Beteasy and social media analysis project 100 Warm Tunas placed "Dance Monkey" by Australian musician Tones and I, "Bad Guy" by American singer-songwriter Billie Eilish, and American rapper Denzel Curry's cover of "Bulls on Parade" for Like a Version as the three songs most likely to take out first place.

== Full list ==
Note: Australian artists

#	Song	Artist	Country of origin
1	Bad Guy	Billie Eilish	United States
2	Rushing Back	Flume featuring Vera Blue	Australia
3	Charlie	Mallrat	Australia
4	Dance Monkey	Tones and I	Australia
5	Bulls on Parade (Like a Version)	Denzel Curry	United States
6	Drink Too Much	G Flip	Australia
7	Robbery	Lime Cordiale	Australia
8	Heavy Hearted	The Jungle Giants	Australia
9	Better in Blak	Thelma Plum	Australia
10	Exit Sign	Hilltop Hoods featuring Illy and Ecca Vandal	Australia
11	Circles	Post Malone	United States
12	By Myself	Fidlar	United States
13	Inappropriate Behaviour	Lime Cordiale	Australia
14	Purple Hat	Sofi Tukker	Germany/United States
15	Never Seen the Rain	Tones and I	Australia
16	Everything I Wanted	Billie Eilish	United States
17	I Touch Myself (Like a Version)	Lime Cordiale	Australia
18	Borderline	Tame Impala	Australia
19	Glitter	Benee	New Zealand
20	Silver	DMA's	Australia
21	Pub Feed	The Chats	Australia
22	Painkiller	Ruel	Australia
23	Earfquake	Tyler, the Creator	United States
24	Infinity	Ocean Alley	Australia
25	Find an Island	Benee	New Zealand
26	Johnny Run Away	Tones and I	Australia
27	Vossi Bop	Stormzy	United Kingdom
28	Juice	Lizzo	United States
29	Piece of Your Heart	Meduza featuring Goodboys	Italy/United Kingdom
30	Friends	Flume featuring Reo Cragun	Australia/United States
31	Save It for the Weekend	Skegss	Australia
32	Money	Lime Cordiale	Australia
33	San Frandisco	Dom Dolla	Australia
34	Tokyo Drifting	Glass Animals featuring Denzel Curry	United Kingdom/United States
35	Bury a Friend	Billie Eilish	United States
36	Solid Gold	Pnau, Kira Divine and Marques Toliver	Australia/United States
37	Red Light Green Light	Duke Dumont featuring Shaun Ross	United Kingdom/United States
38	Face to Face	Ruel	Australia
39	Longshot	Catfish and the Bottlemen	United Kingdom
40	Graveyard	Halsey	United States
41	Highest in the Room	Travis Scott	United States
42	Robbery	Juice Wrld	United States
43	It Might Be Time	Tame Impala	Australia
44	Cool as Hell	Baker Boy	Australia
45	Ricky	Denzel Curry	United States
46	7 Minutes	Dean Lewis	Australia
47	Sugar	Brockhampton	United States
48	Intentions (22)	Ziggy Alberts	Australia
49	Free Time	Ruel	Australia
50	Teach Me About Dying	Holy Holy	Australia
51	Evil Spider	Benee	New Zealand
52	Patience	Tame Impala	Australia
53	You Little Beauty	Fisher	Australia
54	Stained Glass	Ocean Alley	Australia
55	Talk	Khalid	United States
56	Middle Child	J. Cole	United States
57	Jellyfish	Slowly Slowly	Australia
58	Lover	G Flip	Australia
59	Nobody's Home	Mallrat and Basenji	Australia
60	I Missed Out	Hockey Dad	Australia
61	Maybe You Know	Holy Holy	Australia
62	Hell n Back	Bakar	United Kingdom
63	Nightmare	Halsey	United States
64	Circles	George Alice	Australia
65	Homecoming Queen	Thelma Plum	Australia
66	Stupid	G Flip	Australia
67	Wish You Were Gay	Billie Eilish	United States
68	Then What	Illy	Australia
69	Vacation Forever	Violent Soho	Australia
70	Talk Deep	E^ST	Australia
71	Blinding Lights	The Weeknd	Canada
72	Pasta	Angie McMahon	Australia
73	Party Pill	Cub Sport	Australia
74	Nowhere to Go	Hayden James featuring Naations	Australia
75	Paradise	Golden Features and The Presets	Australia
76	Something Tells Me	Meg Mac	Australia
77	I Am Not Afraid	G Flip	Australia
78	Not Angry Anymore	Thelma Plum	Australia
79	Stay Awake	Dean Lewis	Australia
80	Good for You	Spacey Jane	Australia
81	Let You Know	Flume featuring London Grammar	Australia/United Kingdom
82	Sugar	Peking Duk and Jack River	Australia
83	Welcome to the Black Parade (Like a Version)	Alex Lahey	Australia
84	Hey You	Dope Lemon	Australia
85	Doin' Time	Lana Del Rey	United States
86	Unsainted	Slipknot	United States
87	Follow God	Kanye West	United States
88	Lose Control	Meduza, Becky Hill and Goodboys	Italy/United Kingdom
89	Final Form	Sampa the Great	Zambia/Australia
90	Here Comes Your Man (Like a Version)	Skegss	Australia
91	All the Good Girls Go to Hell	Billie Eilish	United States
92	The Real Thing	Client Liaison	Australia
93	Wow	Post Malone	United States
94	Protection	Allday	Australia
95	A.O.K.	Adrian Eagle	Australia
96	Ludens	Bring Me the Horizon	United Kingdom
97	Skin	San Cisco	Australia
98	Meditjin	Baker Boy featuring JessB	Australia/New Zealand
99	C.U.D.I. (Can U Dig It)	Cosmo's Midnight	Australia
100	No Plans	Dune Rats	Australia

=== #101–#200 List ===
On 27 January 2020, Triple J announced the songs placed 101–200th in the countdown.

#	Song	Artist	Country of origin
101	My Strange Addiction	Billie Eilish	United States
102	10/10	Rex Orange County	United Kingdom
103	Crazy	Dune Rats	Australia
104	I Think	Tyler, the Creator	United States
105	Live in Life	The Rubens	Australia
106	Daisy	Pond	Australia
107	I Love You	Billie Eilish	United States
108	Better Than Ever	Flight Facilities featuring Aloe Blacc	Australia/United States
109	Harmony Hall	Vampire Weekend	United States
110	When I'm Around You	Running Touch	Australia
111	Bags	Clairo	United States
112	Sanctuary	Joji	Japan
113	No Halo	Brockhampton	United States
114	Phone Numbers	Dominic Fike and Kenny Beats	United States
115	Real Thing	Middle Kids	Australia
116	Restless	Allday featuring The Veronicas	Australia
117	Don't Be So Hard On Yourself	Alex Lahey	Australia
118	When the Party's Over (Like a Version)	Cub Sport	Australia
119	Trouble	Ruby Fields	Australia
120	Smile	Winston Surfshirt	Australia
121	11 Minutes	Yungblud and Halsey featuring Travis Barker	United Kingdom/United States
122	Fuck It I Love You	Lana Del Rey	United States
123	Goodbyes	Post Malone featuring Young Thug	United States
124	2all	Catfish & the Bottlemen	United Kingdom
125	The Kids Are Coming	Tones and I	Australia
126	Supalonely	Benee featuring Gus Dapperton	New Zealand/United States
127	Tricks	Stella Donnelly	Australia
128	Magnify	Northeast Party House	Australia
129	Bring Me Home	G Flip	Australia
130	Big Yellow Taxi (Like a Version)	Allday and The Veronicas	Australia
131	I'm Not Coming Back	Meg Mac	Australia
132	All My Friends Are Dead	The Amity Affliction	Australia
133	Dominos	Northeast Party House	Australia
134	Masochist	Polaris	Australia
135	RNP	YBN Cordae featuring Anderson .Paak	United States
136	New House	Rex Orange County	United Kingdom
137	Don't Let a Good Girl Down	Thelma Plum	Australia
138	Does It Make You Feel Good?	Confidence Man	Australia
139	Daydreaming	Milky Chance featuring Tash Sultana	Germany/Australia
140	FU	Waax	Australia
141	Hey, Ma	Bon Iver	United States
142	So Easy	Triple One featuring Matt Corby and Kwame	Australia
143	Medicine	Bring Me the Horizon	United Kingdom
144	Freedom	Chillinit	Australia
145	Climate	Ruby Fields	Australia
146	Juicy	Doja Cat and Tyga	United States
147	Mother Tongue	Bring Me the Horizon	United Kingdom
148	Hold Your Nerve	Boy & Bear	Australia
149	Talk It Out	Matt Corby and Tash Sultana	Australia
150	Swing	Sofi Tukker	United States
151	I Will Follow You into the Dark (Like a Version)	Yungblud and Halsey	United Kingdom/United States
152	Face to Face	Rex Orange County	United Kingdom
153	Resolution	Safia	Australia
154	Daytime TV	Dear Seattle	Australia
155	Identity Theft	The Chats	Australia
156	Bad Idea!	Girl in Red	Norway
157	The Greatest	Lana Del Rey	United States
158	Favours	Hayden James and Nat Dunn	Australia
159	Xanny	Billie Eilish	United States
160	Peach	Kevin Abstract	United States
161	Typical Story	Hobo Johnson	United States
162	Like I Remember You	Vera Blue	Australia
163	Rubber Arm	Dune Rats	Australia
164	Parents	Yungblud	United Kingdom
165	The Special Two (Like a Version)	Dear Seattle	Australia
166	Crown	Stormzy	United Kingdom
167	On the Luna	Foals	United Kingdom
168	Babushka Boi	ASAP Rocky	United States
169	Peace	Alison Wonderland	Australia
170	Raka	Golden Features and The Presets	Australia
171	Self-Immolate	King Gizzard & the Lizard Wizard	Australia
172	Make a Move	Winston Surfshirt	Australia
173	Location	Dave featuring Burna Boy	United Kingdom
174	Tempo	Lizzo featuring Missy Elliott	United States
175	Love You for a Long Time	Maggie Rogers	United States
176	In My Room	Frank Ocean	United States
177	Hypersonic Missiles	Sam Fender	United Kingdom
178	Degenerates	A Day To Remember	United States
179	Between You & I	Kita Alexander	Australia
180	Old Man	Stella Donnelly	Australia
181	Butter	Triple One	Australia
182	I Try (Like a Version)	Hockey Dad featuring Hatchie	Australia
183	Wiley Flow	Stormzy	United Kingdom
184	Fado	Milky Chance	Germany
185	Good Grief	Spacey Jane	Australia
186	Ready	Montaigne	Australia
187	Can't Buy Happiness	Tash Sultana	Australia
188	Gone	Charli XCX and Christine & the Queens	United Kingdom/France
189	Fear Inoculum	Tool	United States
190	Hold On	Crooked Colours	Australia
191	Tangled; Content	Luca Brasi	Australia
192	Ask For The Anthem	Ocean Grove	Australia
193	Exits	Foals	United Kingdom
194	Seriously	Bugs	Australia
195	Cheap Queen	King Princess	United States
196	Pluto Projector	Rex Orange County	United Kingdom
197	Pressure To Party	Julia Jacklin	Australia
198	Hold Of Me	Dean Lewis	Australia
199	Sell It All, Run Away	Hilltop Hoods featuring Timberwolf	Australia
200	Later Flight	Jack River	Australia

== Statistics ==
=== Artists with multiple entries ===
#	Artist	Tracks
5	Billie Eilish	1, 16, 35, 67, 91
4	G Flip	6, 58, 66, 77
4	Lime Cordiale	7, 13, 17, 32
3	Flume	2, 30, 81
3	Tones and I	4, 15, 26
3	Denzel Curry (Note: Twice solo (5, 45) and once with Glass Animals (34))	5, 34, 45
3	Thelma Plum	9, 65, 78
3	Tame Impala	18, 43, 52
3	Benee	19, 25, 51
3	Ruel	22, 38, 49
2	Mallrat (Note: Once solo (3), and once with Basenji (59))	3, 59
2	Illy (Note: Once solo (68), and once with Hilltop Hoods (10))	10, 68
2	Post Malone	11, 93
2	Ocean Alley	24, 54
2	Meduza	29, 88
2	Goodboys (Note: Once with Meduza (29), and once as a co-lead artist (88))	29, 88
2	Skegss	31, 90
2	Halsey	40, 63
2	Baker Boy	44, 98
2	Dean Lewis	46, 79
2	Holy Holy	50, 61

=== Countries represented ===
Country	#
Australia	65
United States	27
United Kingdom	10
New Zealand	4
Italy	2
Canada	1
Germany	1
Zambia	1

=== Records ===
- Billie Eilish became the first artist to land more than four tracks in a countdown since Violent Soho in the 2016 countdown. With "bad guy" voted in at #1, she also became the first solo female artist ever to top a Hottest 100.
- With his cover of "Bulls on Parade" at #5, Denzel Curry became the artist with the highest ranking Like a Version to enter a Hottest 100, narrowly overtaking DMA's' #6-placed Like a Version in 2016. This is also tied as the highest ranking cover overall in Hottest 100 history. It joins Björk's cover of "It's Oh So Quiet", Spiderbait's cover of "Black Betty" and Boy & Bear's cover of "Fall At Your Feet", which each ranked at #5 in 1995, 2004 and 2010, respectively.
- With "Better in Blak" at #9, Thelma Plum became the highest ranking Indigenous Australian artist in Hottest 100 history, overtaking A.B. Original's 16th-placed "January 26" from 2016.
- With "Exit Sign", Hilltop Hoods marked their 21st entry in an annual Hottest 100, placing them only one song behind the all-time record of 22 entries shared by Powderfinger and the Foo Fighters.
- With "Unsainted", Slipknot broke the record for the longest absence between countdowns, having last appeared 19 years prior with "Wait and Bleed" in the 2000 countdown. Previously, Paul Kelly held the record with an absence between 2000 and 2016.
- The countdown featured 13 songs in a row by Australian artists, between positions 84 and 72, beating the record of nine consecutive Australian artists set in 2016.
- With "Rushing Back", Flume became the second artist to achieve both the #1 and #2 spots in separate countdowns, after Kendrick Lamar achieved this in 2017.
- Skeggs' cover of "Here Comes Your Man" marked the first time a Pixies song has ever featured in an annual Hottest 100. The band's songs have only ever previously featured in all-time lists in 1990, 1991 and 2009.

== 2019 Triple J Album Poll ==
The annual Triple J album poll was held across November and December and was announced on 15 December. Bold indicates Hottest 100 Winner.

Note: Australian artists

#	Artist	Album	Country of origin	Tracks in the Hottest 100
**1**	**Billie Eilish**	When We All Fall Asleep, Where Do We Go?	**United States**	**1, 16, 35, 67, 91 (8, 46 in 2018)**
2	G Flip	About Us	Australia	6, 58, 66, 77, (38, 62 in 2018)
3	Thelma Plum	Better in Blak	Australia	9, 65, 78, (79 in 2018)
4	Tyler, the Creator	Igor	United States	23
5	Holy Holy	My Own Pool of Light	Australia	50, 61
6	Stella Donnelly	Beware of the Dogs	Australia	DNC (127, 180 in Hottest 200)
7	Catfish and the Bottlemen	The Balance	United Kingdom	39
8	Lana Del Rey	Norman Fucking Rockwell!	United States	85
9	Hilltop Hoods	The Great Expanse	Australia	10, (24, 44 in 2018)
10	Angie McMahon	Salt	Australia	72, (33 in 2017, 49 in 2018)
11	Brockhampton	Ginger	United States	47
12	Flume	Hi This Is Flume	Australia	DNC
13	Methyl Ethel	Triage	Australia	(65 in 2018)
14	Rex Orange County	Pony	United Kingdom	DNC
15	Waax	Big Grief	Australia	(88 in 2018)
16	Maggie Rogers	Heard It in a Past Life	United States	(64 in 2016)
17	Cub Sport	Cub Sport	Australia	73, (30 in 2018)
18	King Gizzard & the Lizard Wizard	Infest the Rats' Nest	Australia	DNC
19	Hayden James	Between Us	Australia	74, (32 in 2017), (15, 78 in 2018)
20	Foals	Part 1: Everything Not Saved Will Be Lost	United Kingdom	DNC
