= Anita Blay =

British-Ghananian singer-songwriter

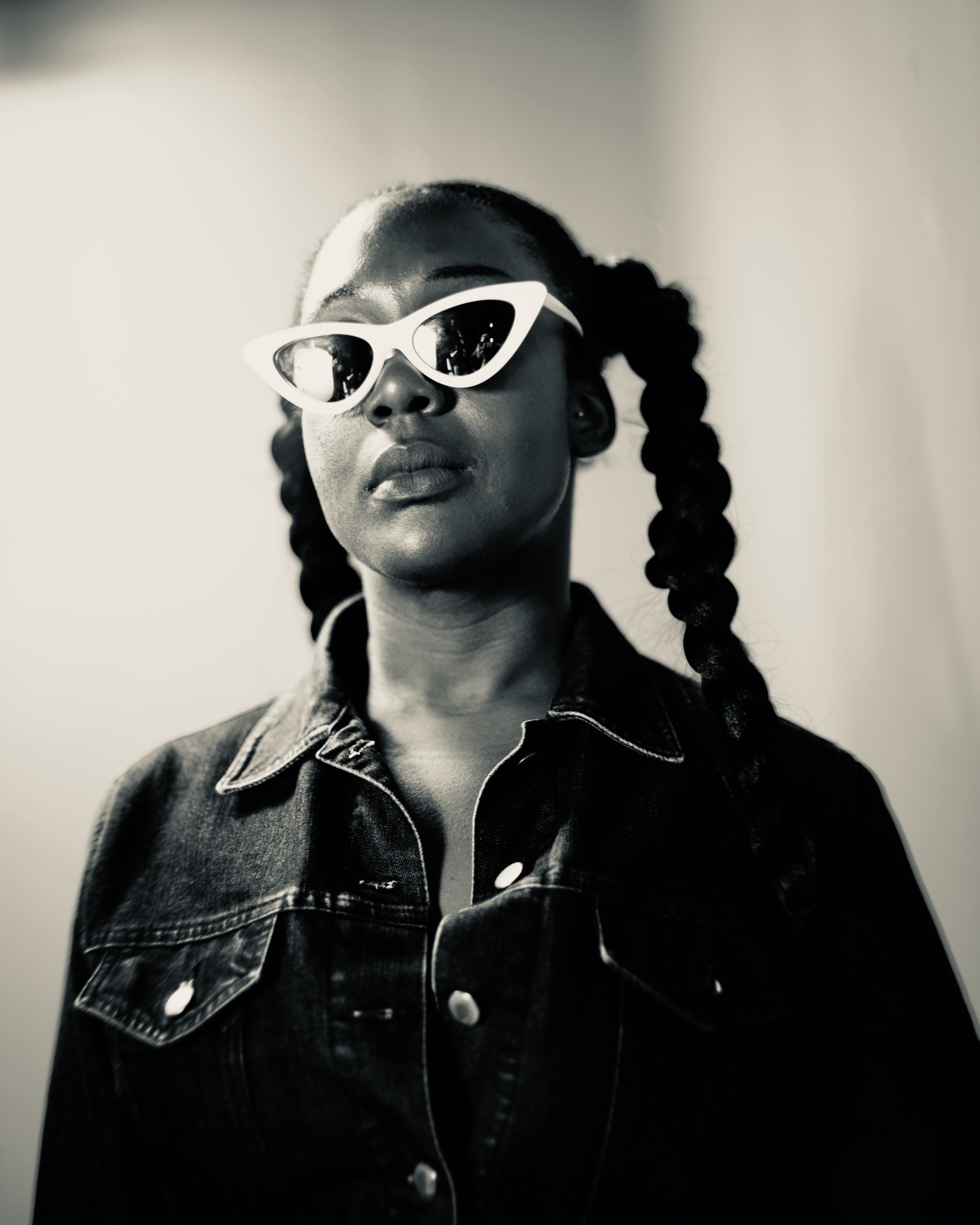
- Blay in 2019

Background information
- Also known as: CocknBullKid
- Born: Anita Esidede Blay
- Origin: Hackney, London, England
- Genres: Pop; synthpop; indie pop; dance; techno; House; Deep house
- Occupations: Singer, songwriter
- Years active: 2008–present
- Labels: Iamsound; Moshi Moshi; Island
- Member of: Antony and Cleopatra; Kommunion
- Spinoff of: X&Y; Tieks
- Website: antonyandcleo.com

Anita Esidede Blay is a British-Ghanaian singer and songwriter, formerly known by the stage name CocknBullKid (previously thecocknbullkid). She released her debut single in 2008 and her debut album, Adulthood, in 2011. Blay currently writes for other artists - and is part of the dance music duo Antony & Cleopatra and the London-based music collective Kommunion.

== Early life ==
Blay was born in Clapton, east London to Ghanaian parents and raised in the city's Hackney area. Her mother left the family when she was 12 years old. She cultivated an interest in music as a teenager, songwriting with rapper Plan B at a youth placement scheme when she was 16. She completed A-levels in English, sociology and theology. Blay took a series of day jobs in her late teens, including one at Southwark Council, but found full-time employment incompatible with her lifestyle and decided to pursue music professionally.

== Career ==
=== 2008–09: Early releases ===
Blay adopted the stage name thecocknbullkid, explaining, "Initially I just liked the way it sounded—it gave me aural satisfaction. Then I liked the idea of calling myself a bulls**tter [sic], it's all a bit tongue-in-cheek." She began uploading material to her MySpace profile and networked with music producers, live promoters and managers.

Blay released her debut single, "On My Own", in April 2008, followed by performances at the Glastonbury Festival and on the TV programme Later... with Jools Holland later in the year. She toured Germany with Vice magazine's Vice Live tour in late 2008. Her second single, "I'm Not Sorry" was released in March 2009, and by May 2009, she had signed to Moshi Moshi through Island Records. Following Blay's appearance at the American music festival SXSW, her debut EP, Querelle, was released in the US via Iamsound Records in August 2009 to positive reviews from Prefix and Spin magazines. To mark the EP's release, Blay issued a free mixtape featuring her own tracks alongside songs by artists including Late of the Pier and Diana Ross. Also in 2009, Blay appeared alongside Alessi's Ark, Micachu, Róisín Murphy, and Sinéad O'Connor on a cover of Chaka Khan's "I'm Every Woman", a charity single released to support ActionAid.

Blay was expected to release a full-length album in 2009, with production from Blue May, Dave McCracken, Joseph Mount (of Metronomy), and Mark-Anthony Tieku. By 2010, Blay said she had scrapped the album's original sound; in 2011, a 12-track album from the initial recording sessions titled Adolescence leaked onto the Internet, and Blay actively encouraged her fans to download it.

=== 2010–11: Adulthood ===
Blay announced the change of her stage name to CocknBullKid in June 2010 and released the song "CocknBullKid" as a free download. Her first single with Moshi Moshi/Island, "One Eye Closed", was released in November 2010, and she opened for Marina and the Diamonds and Kele on their respective tours in October and November. The follow-up single, "Hold on to Your Misery", was released in January 2011, and third single "Asthma Attack" followed in April 2011. These releases preceded her debut album, Adulthood, which was recorded in London, Paris and Stockholm with production from Liam Howe, and includes contributions from Gonzales, Peter Morén (of Peter Bjorn and John), and Joseph Mount. It was released in April 2011, and a fourth and final single, "Yellow", was issued in August 2011. Spin magazine and The Guardian's Michael Cragg named Adulthood one of the best albums of the year.

Blay promoted Adulthood with support slots on UK tours by Janelle Monáe (from February 2011), Duran Duran (May 2011), and Patrick Wolf (October and November 2011). She collaborated with several other artists during 2011; featuring on the track "In Doubt" by Black Devil Disco Club, and on The Shoes' song "Cliché" (from their album Crack My Bones) and their remix of Wolf Gang's "Dancing with the Devil" (alongside Mz. Bratt). Blay co-wrote material for Nicola Roberts' solo album Cinderella's Eyes (2011), but her tracks did not make the final cut of the album.

=== 2012–present: Solo and songwriting work ===
Blay recorded "Doing It Wrong", the theme tune for the BBC Three television series Some Girls, which premiered in 2012. The same year she featured on Niyi's "Ur No Good" and the single "Never Let Go" by Rowdy Superstar, with whom she formed a side project called X&Y. She co-wrote girl group Neon Jungle's 2013 debut single, "Trouble", which reached the top 20 on the UK Singles Chart.

Blay has also been working on a second solo album, according to her publisher Downtown Music Publishing. In 2015, Blay (credited as CocknBullKid) was featured on the Boxed In track "Lo Life".

In April 2016, Blay's songwriting collaboration with Little Mix on their song "Hair", released from their 2015 album Get Weird, was released as an official single, featuring vocals from Sean Paul, and is classed as the biggest and most successful songwriting collaboration that Blay has taken part in so far in her music career.

May 2018 saw Blay co-write a OneRepublic track titled "Start Again". It was featured on the second season of the hit Netflix show 13 Reasons Why.

In September 2020, Blay collaborated with Kae Tempest and High Contrast on a standalone single "Time Is Hardcore". The track was premiered on August 12 on BBC Radio 1 by Clara Amfo, and was subsequently selected as Adele Roberts' "Tune of the Week".

In January 2021, Blay updated her social media profiles from CocknBullKid to Anita Blay, whilst posting a simple message "BRB". This has prompted speculation amongst fans (most notably Perez Hilton) that she may be releasing music under her own artist name some time in 2021.

=== 2012–present: Antony and Cleopatra ===
Antony & Cleopatra
- Genres: Techno; house; dance; Pop; deep house; indie
- Website: antonyandcleo.com

In 2014, Blay and Alexander Burnett (of Australian band Sparkadia) formed a deep house duo called Antony & Cleopatra, who featured on three singles in 2014: Lancelot's "Givin' It Up", Beni's "Protect", and Sammy Bananas' "Money Time".

Their debut single as lead artists, "Sirens", was released in 2015, with multiple singles and collaborations from 2015-2019.

23 November 2018 saw the release of Antony & Cleopatra's 6-song debut EP, Hurt Like Hell. Blay described the EP as "the best way of showing our more techno and weird musical moments that you'd see in our live show or DJ set.".

== Artistry ==
Blay's work encompasses a number of influences including Björk, Celine Dion, Morrissey and synthpop acts, including The Human League and The Knife. BBC 6Music DJ Lauren Laverne has described Blay as "a latter-day Morrissey—or even a British Kelis".

As CocknBull Kid, Blay's visual imagery has been inspired by Mexican folk art and colours prominent in South American culture, and she wears a bespoke headress for her live performances adorned with fairly lights, peace symbols, and skulls.

American singer Shamir has cited CocknBullKid (Blay) as one of his major influences, and had himself tattooed with a lyric from "Hold on to Your Misery".

== Discography ==
=== Studio albums ===
Title	Album details
Adulthood	Released: 23 May 2011; Format: CD, digital download; Label: Moshi Moshi, Island

=== Extended plays ===
Title	Album details
Querelle	Released: 4 August 2009; Format: CD, digital download; Label: Iamsound

=== Mixtapes ===
- thecocknbullkid (2009)

=== Singles ===
==== as CocknBull Kid ====
List of singles
Title	Year	Album
"On My Own"	2008	—N/a
"I'm Not Sorry"	2009	Querelle
"One Eye Closed"	2010	Adulthood
"Hold on to Your Misery"	2011	Adulthood
"Asthma Attack"	2011	Adulthood
"Yellow"	2011	Adulthood

==== as Antony & Cleopatra ====
List of singles
Title	Year	Artist(s)
"Givin' It Up" (feat. Antony & Cleopatra)	2014	Lancelot
"Money Time" (feat. Antony & Cleopatra)	2014	Sammy Bananas
"Protect" (feat. Antony & Cleopatra)	2014	Beni
"Sirens"	2015	Antony & Cleopatra
"Take Me"	2015	Antony & Cleopatra
"Love Is A Lonely Dancer"	2016	Antony & Cleopatra
"Careful Baby" (feat. Antony & Cleopatra)	2016	Nicky Night Time
"The Future" (feat. Antony & Cleopatra)	2017	Motez
"Never Get To You"	2017	Moon Boots
"Dust"	2017	Antony & Cleopatra
"Twitch"	2017	Antony & Cleopatra
"The Islands"	2018	Antony & Cleopatra
"Hurt Like Hell"	2018	Antony & Cleopatra
"Why Don't You Just Call Me"	2019	Antony & Cleopatra
"Slippin"	2019	Jaded / Black Caviar / Antony & Cleopatra

==== as Kommunion ====
List of singles
Title	Year	Artist(s)
"Lose My Cool"	2022	KOMMUNION

=== Guest appearances ===
Year	Song	Album
2009	"I'm Every Woman" (Alessi's Ark, thecocknbullkid, Micachu, Róisín Murphy, and Sinéad O'Connor)	—N/a
2010	"Anywhere You Looked" (CockNBullKid remix) (Au Revoir Simone)	Night Light
2011	"In Doubt" (Black Devil Disco Club featuring CocknBullKid)	Circus
2011	"Cliché" (The Shoes featuring CocknBullKid)	Crack My Bones
2011	"Dancing with the Devil" (Shoes remix) (Wolf Gang featuring CocknBullKid + Mz. Bratt)	—N/a
2012	"Never Let Go" (Rowdy Superstar featuring CocknBullKid)	Battery
2012	"Ur No Good" (Niyi featuring CocknBullKid)	Great Britain: The Best of 2005–2012
2015	"Lo Life" (Boxed In featuring CocknBullKid)	Boxed In
2020	"Time Is Hardcore" (Boxed In featuring Kae Tempest and Anita Blay)	Notes from the Underground

=== Songwriting credits ===
Title	Year	Artist(s)	Album	Written with:
"Budbäraren"	2012	Peter Morén	Pyramiden	Peter Morén
"Trouble"	2013	Neon Jungle	Welcome to the Jungle	Benjamin Berry
"Future X Girl"	2014	Neon Jungle	Welcome to the Jungle	Aminata Jamieson
"London Rain"	2014	Neon Jungle	Welcome to the Jungle	Benjamin Berry, Uzoechi Emenike
"Right Beside You" (featuring Damon C Scott)	2014	The Dealer	Non-album single	Timothy Deal, Benjamin Berry, Andrew Bullimore
"Home"	2015	Blue	Colours	Duncan James, Paul Meehan
"Hair"	2015	Little Mix	Get Weird	Edvard Forre Erfjord, Henrik Michelsen, Iain James, Camille Purcell
"To Be Free"	2017	L D R U	Non-album single	Drew Carmody, Alexander Burnett, Anita Blay
"Bad Boys"	2018	Lilly Ahlberg	Non-album single	Lilly Ahlberg, Johnny Hockings, Matthew Newman
"Skin" (featuring Lotto Boyzz)	2018	Taya	Non-album single	Taya, Alan Sampson, Ashley Kirnon, Lucas Henry
"Start Again" (featuring Logic)	2018	OneRepublic	13 Reasons Why: OST	Ryan Tedder, Justin Franks, Jez Ashurst, Daniel Mijo Majic, Alexander Stacey, Sir Robert Hall II
"Frozen Frames"	2018	Hannah Jane Lewis	Non-album single	Hannah Jane Lewis, Johannes Andersson
"Capricorn"	2018	Elderbrook	Old Friend EP	Alexander Kotz, Alexander Burnett, Oliver Horton, Nicholas Routledge
"Lost in Space"	2019	Becky Hill	TBA	Rebecca Hill, Peter "LostBoy" Rycroft
"Celebration"	2019	Tieks	TBA	Mark Tieku, Alexander Burnett, Anita Blay, Jack Badu, Oliver Horton, Senab Adekunle
