= Backseat of My Mind =

Single by Thelma Plum

from the album Meanjin
- Released: 27 May 2022
- Genre: Indie / Alternative
- Length: 4:24
- Label: Warner Music Australia
- Songwriters: Thelma Plum; Alexander Burnett; Oli Horton
- Producers: Burnett; Horton

Thelma Plum singles chronology
"Go to War" (2020)	"Backseat of My Mind" (2022)	"When It Rains It Pours" (2022)

"Backseat of My Mind" is a song by Australian singer/songwriter Thelma Plum, released on 27 May 2022 as the lead single from Plum’s third EP Meanjin.

At the National Indigenous Music Awards 2022, "Backseat of My Mind" was nominated for Song of the Year.

At the APRA Music Awards of 2023, "Backseat of My Mind" was shortlisted for Song of the Year.

At the Queensland Music Awards of 2023, the song won the Pop Award and Song of the Year. By winning Song of the Year, Plum won her first plaque on the Brunswick Street Mall Walk of Fame.

== Background ==
"Backseat of My Mind" was the Plum's first original new music in three years, following her ARIA-winning debut album in 2019 and follows a cover of Powderfinger's "These Days" and Briggs' collaboration "Go to War", both of which were released in 2020.

In April 2022, Plum revealed she had completed "a whole new album and then some", teasing that she would be releasing a new single "very soon". In a cover story for that month's edition of InStyle Australia, Plum said: "I feel like I have like two bodies of work that feel very separate to me, these songs. So, I'm going to try to figure out how to release them this year."

"Backseat of My Mind" was released in May 2022 and is a reflection on where she's been as she moves towards where she's going. In a statement, Plum said "I've spent a lot of time in vans (although not recently lol) and I really wanted to write a nostalgic feeling 'driving' song, which I hope we nailed!"

== Reception ==
Anna Rose from NME said "'Backseat of My Mind' harbours a swoon-worthy effect in Plum's delivery. Coupling dainty pop licks with syrupy and emotive, indie-esque vocal melodies, Plum maintains a cool calm as she sings lyrics of great reflection."

Alex Gallagher from Music Feeds said "Opening as a pensive, piano-driven ballad, Plum's latest swells to a soaring chorus about driving forward and abandoning what you need to, 'As I look in the rear view mirror, I leave it behind / In the backseat of my mind'."

== Track listing ==
Digital download
No.	Title	Length
1.	"Backseat of My Mind"	4:24
2.	"Backseat of My Mind" (radio edit)	3:30

== Charts ==
Chart performance for "Backseat of My Mind"
Chart (2022)	Peak position
New Zealand Hot Singles (RMNZ)	40
