= Homecoming Queen (Thelma Plum song) =

- Strings version

Single by Thelma Plum

from the album Better in Blak
- Released: 12 July 2019
- Length: 3:51
- Label: Mosy Recordings, Sony Music Australia
- Songwriters: Thelma Plum; Alexander Burnett; Oli Horton
- Producer: Alexander Burnett

Thelma Plum singles chronology
"Better in Blak" (2019)	"Homecoming Queen" (2019)	"These Days" (2020)

"Homecoming Queen" is a song by Australian singer/songwriter Thelma Plum, and was sent to radio on 12 July 2019 as the fourth and final single from her debut studio album Better in Blak.

Plum told Triple J that the song "speaks to growing up as an Aboriginal girl in rural Australia", saying, "watching videos on the TV and looking through magazines, but I never saw anyone who looked like me. There was absolutely no representation in mainstream media. That really does something, really skews your idea of beauty. I had to teach myself how to love myself, that I was beautiful and good enough."

There is a refence in the song to the 1967 Australian referendum, which asked Australians whether Indigenous Australians should be included in official population counts for constitutional purposes.

The song polled at number 67 in the Triple J Hottest 100, 2019.

At the National Indigenous Music Awards 2020, the song was nominated for Song of the Year.

An Alice Ivy remix was released on the Anniversary Edition of the album in 2020.

Plum performed the song on The Sound on 15 November 2020.

A strings version was released in October 2021.

== Reception ==
Cool Accidents said "'Homecoming Queen' is ultimately an anthem of self-love - one that embraces differences and celebrates individuality."

Dani Maher from Harper's Bazaar said "'Homecoming Queen', like all of her releases, is a lyrical delight pinning her heart resolutely to her sleeve in its vulnerability".

Nathan Jolly from The Guardian called it the "standout track" from the album said "Feeling unseen as a young Indigenous Australian must be a crushing and damaging experience, and Plum chronicles this experience and her own hard-fought rise to self-respect in a wonderfully moving way."

== Versions ==
1. "Homecoming Queen" (album) – 3:51
2. "Homecoming Queen" (Alice Ivy remix) – 4:28
3. "Homecoming Queen" (strings) – 4:22

== Certifications ==
Region	Certification	Certified units/sales
Australia (ARIA)	Platinum	70,000^{‡}
New Zealand (RMNZ)	Gold	15,000^{‡}
^{‡} Sales+streaming figures based on certification alone.
