= Meanjin (disambiguation) =

Meanjin is one of several Indigenous Australian names for the city of Brisbane.

Several works are named after this locality:

- Meanjin, an Australian literary magazine based in Melbourne.
- Meanjin, a 2022 extended play by Thelma Plum
