= Alexander Burnett (musician) =

Australian musician

Alex Burnett
- Origin: Sydney, Australia
- Genres: Pop; dance; indie
- Occupations: Singer, songwriter, music producer
- Years active: 2007–present
- Labels: Ark Recordings, Ivy League Records, Dew Process/UMA
- Member of: Kommunion; Sparkadia; Antony & Cleopatra
- Website: xanderburnett.com

Alex Burnett (also known as Alexander Burnett) is a Sydney/London based singer, songwriter and producer known for fronting his band Sparkadia and collaborations with major artists including Thelma Plum, Hockey Dad, DJ Snake, Hayden James, Flight Facilities, Elderbrook, Mansionair, Kano, Chaka Khan and Hudson Taylor.

In 2011, he was labelled "what might be Australia's best rising songwriter" by the Sydney Morning Herald.

== Sparkadia ==
Attracted by indie pop, Burnett formed his first band, The Spark, in 2005 with drummer David Hall. After relentless touring, the group signed to Ark Recordings in the UK and Ivy League records in Australia, and changed their name to Sparkadia.

Their debut album Postcards was recorded and produced by Ben Hillier (Blur, Depeche Mode) at Miloco Studios in London in 2007 and released in 2008. Nominated for Album of the Year in that year's J Awards, it achieved Platinum sales in Australia. The hit single "Jealousy" hit #79 in Triple J's Hottest 100 for 2008. Sparkadia went on to tour internationally, playing at many of the European summer festivals including Glastonbury and T in the Park and opening for acts including Vampire Weekend, Death Cab for Cutie, Tegan and Sara, and Jimmy Eat World. After an Australian tour in 2009 playing Big Day Out, several of Alexander's Sparkadia bandmates went on to other projects.

Alex spent time in Berlin, Stockholm, New York City, and Los Angeles, before moving to London in 2010. There he made the second Sparkadia album, The Great Impression, as a solo project, playing all the instruments, with Mark "Tieks" Tieku (Florence and the Machine) co-producing. Inspirations for the record ranged from Berlin-era David Bowie to Roy Orbison to Javanese Gamelan. The album debuted at #8 on the ARIA charts and placed in the top 50 for the following year, also achieving Gold sales, with three singles placing in the Hottest 100. The single "China" was a finalist in the 2011 Vanda and Young Songwriting Competition. His tour dates in 2011 with the new members of Sparkadia included Splendour in the Grass, which also featured Coldplay and Kanye West.

== Collaborations ==
In 2011, Burnett co-wrote "2 Hearts" on Digitalism's 2011 album I Love You, Dude. The same year, Burnett co-wrote and produced the lead single "Act Yr Age" for Bluejuice's album Company. The following year, he worked again with Bluejuice on their single "S.O.S." and co-wrote Hudson Taylor's breakthrough single "Battles".

In 2014, he co-wrote and produced George Maple's breakthrough hit "Talk Talk". This was reworked by DJ Snake and released in 2016 as "Talk", which hit #13 on Billboard's hot dance/electronic chart in the US. He also co-wrote Bluejuice's final single, "I'll Go Crazy" and was a writer on Bliss n Eso's gold single "Act Your Age", which won APRA's 2014 Urban Work of the Year award.

In 2015, he co-wrote Hayden James's "Something About You", which hit No. 44 on the Triple J Hottest 100, 2015. He also wrote three tracks for Alison Wonderland as well as singles by Flight Facilities and Motez. In November of that year he was among the speakers at the Electronic Music Conference, along with Flume and Porter Robinson. In 2016 he wrote with Japanese Wallpaper on 'Cocoon', Hayden James' 'Just a Lover', The Kaiser Chiefs' return single 'Hole in My Soul', and other songs with Joy, Paces, and Nicole Millar. 2017 saw collaborations with Rationale, Grades, Tieks with Chaka Khan, LDRU, BETSY, and Dan Sultan on his album Killer.

At the start of 2018 he co-wrote and produced "Clumsy Love" from Gamilaraay singer-songwriter Thelma Plum's first release since 2014 and subsequently co-wrote produced her multiple ARIA nominated album, 'Better in Blak' with highlights being 'Homecoming Queen', 'Not Angry Anymore' and 'Don't Bring A Good Girl Down'. The same year, his co-write with Dan Sultan, 'Hold It Together', received an APRA Song of the Year nomination. He accumulated further writing and producing credits in 2018, with Elderbrook, Jack River, Mansionair, Graace and Japanese Wallpaper.

April 2021 saw the song 'Better in Blak' written by Burnett and Thelma Plum win the highly coveted 'Vanda and Young' Global songwriting competition. Another collaboration, 'Homecoming Queen' placed third which was a historical first in the competition.

Burnett and Thelma Plum went back into the studio in 2021 to write songs for her EP, 'Meanjin', which was produced by Burnett and Oli Horton. The singles 'Backseat of My Mind' and 'The Brown Snake' were both placed #21 and #44 of the Hottest 100 of that year.

2023 saw the first release from his collaborations with Windang surf rock band Hockey Dad. 'Still Have Room' saw the band return to form with a new sound and were placed #44 of the Hottest 100 of that year. The band released 'Base Camp' on 24th February and announced the title of their fourth studio album, 'Rebuild, Repeat' which Burnett co-wrote with and produced all the tracks with Oli Horton & Timothy McArtney.

Burnett currently resides in Sydney working out of his own studio, LONG LIFE LIMITED, in Darlinghurst Australia.

== Discography (as producer and songwriter) ==
Song	Artist	Year	Record	Label	Writer	Producer
"Ready for Love"	Matthew Ifield	2025	Single	EMI	check	check
"Freckles"	Thelma Plum	2024	Single	Warner	check	check
"Wise Man"	Thelma Plum	2024	Single	Warner	check	check
"Nobody's Baby"	Thelma Plum	2024	Single	Warner	check	check
"All the Pretty Little Horses"	Thelma Plum	2024	Single	Warner	check	check
"Golden Touch"	Thelma Plum	2024	Single	Warner	check	check
"Koala"	Thelma Plum	2024	Album Track	Warner	check	check
"Comboy in the Rain"	Thelma Plum	2024	Album Track	Warner	check	check
"Love I Want"	Thelma Plum	2024	Album Track	Warner	check	check
"Guwop"	Thelma Plum	2024	Album Track	Warner	check	check
"I don't play that song anymore"	Thelma Plum	2024	Album Track	Warner	check	check
"Safety Pin"	Hockey Dad	2024	Single	BMG	check	check
"That's on You"	Hockey Dad	2024	Single	BMG	check	check
"Wreck & Ruin"	Hockey Dad	2024	Single	BMG	check	check
"Base Camp"	Hockey Dad	2024	Single	BMG	check	check
"Dancing on the Other Hand"	Hockey Dad	2024	Album Track	BMG	check	check
"Road Signs"	Hockey Dad	2024	Album Track	BMG	check	check
"Backup Plan"	Hockey Dad	2024	Album Track	BMG	check	check
"Unhinged"	Hockey Dad	2024	Album Track	BMG	check	check
"Seething"	Hockey Dad	2024	Album Track	BMG	check	check
"Burning Sand"	Hockey Dad	2024	Album Track	BMG	check	check
"We Don't Talk About It"	Thelma Plum	2023	Single	Warner	check	check
"Still Have Room"	Hockey Dad	2023	Single	BMG	check	check
"Backseat of My Mind"	Thelma Plum	2023	Single	Warner	check	check
"Blip"	Wongo	2023	Single	HELDEEP RECORDS	check	check
"Lose My Cool"	KOMMUNION	2023	Single	Tinted Records	check	check
"Fix Myself"	Hanni	2023	Single	Universal Music	check	check
"Home with Me"	Riiki Reid	2023	Single	Warner	check	
"Da Da Da"	Wongo	2022	Single	TMRW	check	
"The Brown Snake"	Thelma Plum	2022	Single	Warner	check	check
"When it Rains it Pours"	Thelma Plum	2022	Single	Warner	check	check
"Baby Blue Bicycle"	Thelma Plum	2022	Single	Warner	check	check
"Bars on my Windows"	Thelma Plum	2022	Single	Warner	check	check
"Bat Song"	Thelma Plum	2022	Single	Warner	check	check
"The Future (Reprised)"	Motez	2022	Single	Sweat it Out	check	check
"Euphoria"	Harper Finn	2022	Single	Warner	check	check
"Apple"	Wongo (feat. Jade Alice)	2022	Single	HELDEEP RECORDS	check	
"Have it Like That"	Health Club	2021	Single	Off Leash Records	check	
"Feels like Home"	Thelma Plum	2021	Qantas collaboration	Warner		check
"Better in Blak"(Antony & Cleopatra remix)	Thelma Plum x Antony & Cleopatra	2020	Single remix	Warner	check	check
"Body do the Talking"	Thelma Plum	2020	Single	Warner	check	check
"Time is Hardcore"	High Contrast (feat Kae Tempest & Anita Blay)	2020	Single	3 Beat	check	
"A Million Times"	Cosmos Midnight	2020	Single	Sony	check	
"Trouble"	Kano	2019	Single	Warner	check	
"Better in Blak"	Thelma Plum	2019	Single	Warner	check	check
"Celebrate"	Tieks	2019	Single	eOne UK	check	
"Imaginary Friends"	Japanese Wallpaper	2019	Single	Sony	check	
"Hiding From Love"	Hudson Taylor	2019	Single	Rubyworks	check	
"Why Don't You Just Call Me"	Antony & Cleopatra	2019	Single	Dew Process	check	check
"Don't Bring a Good Girl Down"	Thelma Plum	2019	Single	Warner	check	check
"Homecoming Queen"	Thelma Plum	2019	Single	Warner	check	check
"Woke Blokes"	Thelma Plum	2019	Album Track	Warner	check	check
"Nick Cave"	Thelma Plum	2019	Album Track	Warner	check	check
"Thulumaay Gii"	Thelma Plum	2019	Album Track	Warner	check	check
"Ugly"	Thelma Plum	2019	Album Track	Warner	check	check
"Do You Ever Get So Sad?"	Thelma Plum	2019	Album Track	Warner		check
"Love & War"	Thelma Plum	2019	Album Track	Warner		check
"Ready/Waiting"	Japanese Wallpaper	2019	Album track	Sony	check	
"Float"	Japanese Wallpaper	2019	Album track	Sony	check	
"Caving In"	Japanese Wallpaper	2019	Album track	Sony	check	
"Tongue Tied"	Japanese Wallpaper	2019	Album track	Sony	check	
"Wearing You Out"	Japanese Wallpaper	2019	Album track	Sony	check	
"Glow"	Japanese Wallpaper	2019	Album track	Sony	check	
"Hiding in the Bushes"	Roland Tings	2019	Single	Sony		check
"All of Your Heart"	Odd Mob	2019	Single	Tinted/Spinnin'	check	
"Doing it Wrong"	Charlie Collins	2019	Single	Mirror Records	check	
"Not Angry Anymore"	Thelma Plum	2019	Single	Warner	check	check
"Slippin"	Antony & Cleopatra x Jaded x Black Caviar	2019	Single	Globe Town Records (UK) / Hexagon (US)	check	check
"Being There"	Roland Tings	2019	Album Track	Sony		check
"Always Rushing"	Roland Tings	2019	Album Track	Sony		check
"Up Close"	Roland Tings	2019	Album Track	Sony		check
"Circulating"	Roland Tings	2019	Album Track	Sony		check
"Rainforest"	Roland Tings	2019	Album Track	Sony		check
"In a Cloud"	Roland Tings	2019	Album Track	Sony		check
"Watermusic"	Roland Tings	2019	Album Track	Sony		check
"Song for a Sinking Ship"	Roland Tings	2019	Album Track	Sony		check
"Sun drops behind the hill"	Roland Tings	2019	Album Track	Sony		check
"Clumsy Love"	Thelma Plum	2018	Single	Warner	check	check
"Steady Motion"	Motez	2018	Single	Sweat it Out		check
"Capricorn"	Elderbrook	2018	Single	Parlophone UK	check	
"Hurt Like Hell"	Antony & Cleopatra	2018	Single	Dew Process	check	check
"Easy Baby"	Hudson Taylor	2018	Single	Rubyworks	check	
"Falling"	Mansionair	2018	Single	Glassnote	check	
"Confess"	Jack River	2018	Single	I OH YOU	check	
"Cloud Party"	Muto	2018	Single	Of Leisure		check
"Fooling Around"	Japanese Wallpaper	2018	Single	Sony	check	
"Sorry in Advance"	Graace	2018	Single	Sony	check	
"Bad Habits"	Far East Movement	2018	Single	Sony	check	
"Twitch"	Antony & Cleopatra	2018	Single	Dew Process/Universal	check	check
"The Islands"	Antony & Cleopatra	2018	Single	Dew Process/Universal	check	check
"Hard Feelings"	Antony & Cleopatra	2018	Single	Dew Process/Universal	check	check
"Baptised"	Antony & Cleopatra	2018	EP	Dew Process/Universal	check	check
"Worlds Apart"	Antony & Cleopatra	2018	EP	Dew Process/Universal	check	check
"Dropping Plates"	Antony & Cleopatra	2018	EP	Dew Process/Universal	check	check
"Safe Word"	Antony & Cleopatra	2018	EP	Dew Process/Universal	check	check
"Under a Bridge"	Yates	2018	Single	Sweat it Out		check
"Give up the Guff"	Yates	2018	EP	Sweat it Out		check
"Get the Gist"	Yates	2018	EP	Sweat it Out		check
"34m2"	Yates	2018	EP	Sweat it Out		check
"Living Of The Moon"	Yates	2018	EP	Sweat it Out		check
"Visceral"	Motez	2018	EP	Sweat it Out	check	
"Slow Down"	Sammy Bananas	2018	EP	Fools Gold	check	
"Man in the Moon"	LCAW	2016	Single	Sony Germany	check	check
"Reciprocate"	Rationale	2017	Single	Warner UK	check	
"To Be Free"	LDRU	2017	Single	Sony	check	
"Feel That"	Akouo (feat Montaigne)	2017	Single	Sony		check
"Dust"	Antony & Cleopatra	2016	Single	Create Control	check	check
"Hold it Together"	Dan Sultan	2017	Single	Liberation	check	
"Little White Lies"	Betsy	2017	Single	Warner UK		check
"Lost & Found"	Betsy	2017	Single	Warner UK		check
"Wanted More"	Betsy	2017	Single	Warner UK		check
"View Looks so good"	Lakyn	2017	EP	Universal	check	check
"The Future"	Motez (feat. Antony & Cleopatra)	2017	Single	Sweat it Out	check	
"Make U"	Gianni Marino	2017	Single	Vicious	check	
"The Drover"	Dan Sultan	2017	Album	Liberation	check	
"Reaction"	Dan Sultan	2017	Album	Liberation	check	
"New Get To You"	Moonboots (feat. Antony & Cleopatra)	2017	Single	Anjuna	check	
"Say a Prayer"	Tieks (feat. Chaka Khan and Popcaan)	2017	Single	MOS UK	check	
"All I Need"	Nocturnal Tapes	2017	Single	Sony AU	check	
"Let Me In"	Illstrd	2017	Single	Vicious	check	
"Tiptoe"	LK Mckay (feat Doe Paroe & AB)	2016	Single	Dew Process	check	
"Cover Me"	Nicole Millar	2016	Tremble EP	EMI	check	
"Quicksand"	Dayne S	2016	Single	Armada	check	
"Loop"	Paces	2016	Album	etc. etc.	check	
"Love is a Lonely Dancer"	Antony & Cleopatra	2016	Single	Universal	check	check
"One Big Laugh"	Pang!	2016	Single	Sony (Sweden)	check	
"Careful Baby"	Nicky Night Time (feat. Antony & Cleopatra)	2016	Single	One Love	check	
"Talk"	DJ Snake (feat. George Maple)	2016	Single	Interscope	check	
"Cocoon"	Japanese Wallpaper	2016	Single	Sony	check	
"Me Tonight"	Jason Ross (feat. Lauren Ray)	2016	Single	Anjuna Beats	check	
"Just a Lover"	Hayden James	2016	Single	Future Classic	check	
"Magnetise"	Shy Luv	2016	Single	Future Classic	check	
"Been Here Before"	Indian Summer	2016	Single	Sweat it Out	check	
"Hole in my Soul"	Kaiser Chiefs	2016	Single	Polydor	check	
"Desert"	Paces (feat. Guy Sebastian)	2016	Single	etc. etc.	check	
"Love Like This"	Indian Summer feat Lastlings	2016	Single	Sweat it Out	check	
"You Give Me Love"	Poolclvb	2016	Single	etc. etc.	check	
"The Summer That Was Ours"	Juno Sun	2016	Single	Gomma Germany	check	check
"U Don't Know"	Alison Wonderland	2015	Run	EMI/Astral Werks	check	
"Take it to Reality"	Alison Wonderland	2015	Run	EMI/Astral Werks	check	
"Already Gone"	Alison Wonderland	2015	Run	EMI/Astral Werks	check	
"Take Me"	Antony & Cleopatra	2015	Single	Vitalic Noise	check	check
"Sirens"	Antony & Cleopatra	2015	Single	Vitalic Noise	check	check
"The Tide"	Dreamtrak	2015	Dreamtrak	Double Denim	check	
"The Night Before the Morning After"	Hudson Taylor	2015	Singing for Strangers Album	Polydor UK	check	
"Battles"	Hudson Taylor	2015	Battles I & II EP	Polydor UK	check	
"Off the Hook"	Hudson Taylor	2015	Singing for Strangers Album	Polydor UK	check	
"Heads or Tails"	Joy	2015	Ode EP	Sony	check	
"Another You"	Beni	2015	Single	One Love	check	
"Something About You"	Hayden James	2014	Single	Future Classic	check	
"Talk Talk"	George Maple	2014	Single	Future Classic	check	
"Bitter"	Huntar	2014	Bitter EP	Neon Gold	check	
"Own Up"	Motez	2014	Own Up EP	Sweat it Out	check	
"Givin' It Up"	Lancelot (feat. Antony & Cleopatra)	2014	Lancelot vs A&C	Anjuna Deep	check	check
"Make Ends Meet"	Lancelot (feat. Antony & Cleopatra)	2014	Lancelot vs A&C	Anjuna Deep	check	check
"Money/Time"	Sammy Bananas (feat. Antony & Cleopatra)	2014	Money/Time EP	Fools Gold	check	
"Protect"	Beni (feat. Antony & Cleopatra)	2014	Protect EP	Modular/WIN	check	
"I'll Go Crazy"	Bluejuice	2014	Retrospective	Dew Process	check	
"No Times for Tears"	Bluejuice	2014	Retrospective	Dew Process	check	
"On Every Tongue"	Geoffrey O'Connor	2014	Fan Fiction	Chapter	check	
"Another Time"	Geoffrey O'Connor	2014	Fan Fiction	Chapter	check	
"Only Me (feat. VCS)"	Elizabeth Rose	2014	Sensibility EP	Inertia	check	
"It Belongs to Us"	Dan Sultan	2014	Blackbird	Mushroom	check	
"Gullible Few"	Dan Sultan	2014	Blackbird	Mushroom	check	
"I Didn't Believe"	Flight Facilities feat. Elizabeth Rose	2013	I Didn't Believe EP	Inertia	check	
"Under Your Skin"	Dan Sultan	2013	Blackbird	Mushroom	check	
"Guess I'll Never Know"	Inca	2013	Single	Independent	check	
"Waterfall"	Theme from the Movie 'Plot For Peace'	2013	Plot for Peace soundtrack	Independent	check	check
"Act Your Age"	Bliss n Eso	2013	Circus in the Sky	Illusive	check	
"Running in the Rain"	Bobby Flynn	2013	Single	Independent	check	check
"On N On"	A. Chal	2013	Ballroom Riots EP	Independent	check	
"The Big Sleep"	Urthboy	2012	Smokey's Haunt	Elefant Traks	check	
"Naive Bravado"	Urthboy feat. Daniel Merriweather	2012	Smokey's Haunt	Elefant Traks	check	
"Faithful"	Phrase	2011	Babylon	Universal	check	
"2 Hearts"	Digitalism	2011	I Love You, Dude	V2 Records	check	
"Shock"	Bluejuice	2011	Company	Dew Process	check	check
"Act Yr Age"	Bluejuice	2011	Company	Dew Process	check	check

== Triple J Hottest 100 Appearances ==
Song	Artist	Year	Chart Position
"Freckles"	Thelma Plum	2024	#107
"Base Camp"	Hockey Dad	2024	#116
"Safety Pin"	Hockey Dad	2024	#119
"Wreck & Ruin"	Hockey Dad	2024	#126
"Nobody's Baby"	Thelma Plum	2024	#127
"Still Have Room"	Hockey Dad	2023	#44
"We Don't Talk About It"	Thelma Plum	2023	#55
"Backseat of my Mind"	Thelma Plum	2022	#21
"The Brown Snake"	Thelma Plum	2022	#66
"Better in Blak" (Like a Version)	Beddy Rays	2021	#190
"Better in Blak"	Thelma Plum	2019	#9
"Homecoming Queen"	Thelma Plum	2019	#65
"Not Angry Anymore"	Thelma Plum	2019	#78
"Don't Let A Good Girl Down"	Thelma Plum	2019	#137
"Clumsy Love"	Thelma Plum	2018	#79
"Confess"	Jack River	2018	#125
"To Be Free"	LDRU	2017	#200
"The Future"	Motez (feat. Antony & Cleopatra)	2017	#157
"Just a Lover"	Hayden James	2016	#125
"Something About You"	Hayden James	2015	#44
"U Don't Know"	Alison Wonderland feat. Wayne Coyne	2015	#113
"Take it to Reality"	Alison Wonderland	2015	#137
"I'll Go Crazy"	Bluejuice	2014	#25
"Talk Talk"	George Maple	2014	#120
"I Didn't Believe"	Flight Facilities	2013	#120
"Under Your Skin"	Dan Sultan	2013	#197
"Act Your Age"	Bliss n Eso	2013	#67
"S.O.S."	Bluejuice	2012	#140
"Act Yr Age"	Bluejuice	2011	#20
"Mary"	Sparkadia	2011	#47
"China"	Sparkadia	2011	#56
"2 Hearts"	Digitalism	2011	#109
"Talking Like I'm Falling Down Stairs"	Sparkadia	2010	#25
"Jealousy"	Sparkadia	2008	#79
"Too Much to Do"	Sparkadia	2008	#111

== Antony & Cleopatra ==
Full article & discography at Antony & Cleopatra.

=== 2014: Formation ===
Antony & Cleopatra
- Website: antonyandcleo.com

Producer and collaborator Mark-Anthony Tieku (AKA "Tieks") introduced Burnett and Anita Blay (AKA CocknBullKid) during a pop songwriting session in 2014.

Burnett and Blay subsequently formed a deep house duo called Antony & Cleopatra. They soon featured on three singles in 2014: Lancelot's "Givin' It Up", Beni's "Protect", and Sammy Bananas' "Money Time".

Alexander has said that being brought on to write for Digitalism around 2011 was part of his motivation both as a songwriter and as an artist to transition away from Sparkadia and towards electronic music, also citing "falling a bit out of love with the guitar".

=== Releases ===
Their debut single as lead artists, "Sirens", was released in 2015 and was followed with multiple singles and collaborations from 2015 to 2019.

November 23, 2018, saw the release of Antony & Cleopatra's 6-song debut EP, Hurt Like Hell, to strong reviews:

- ""Hurt Than Hell" packs a punch with its twisting synth stabs and looping vocals, while songs like "Hard Feelings" pulse with a thick house bounce and 8-bit twists which together, straddle on that fine line between both forward-thinking and nostalgic - something that is super, super hard to pull off, but something that Antony & Cleopatra do so with ease."
  — Pile Rats
- "Hurt Like Hell is like escaping into a dark basement club with pumping beats echoing off the red-lit walls for twenty minutes. Antony & Cleopatra create danceable tunes with new twists and turns making their electronic project standout, and unlike other artists this Duo does not get lost in wide seas and endless possibilities of electronically produced music. Recognising that it is not about who can layer the most beats, they pick the most interesting tunes out of the broad spectrum and arrange them carefully to an intelligent EP, and a ready-made playlist for any good party." 4/5 stars
  — The AU Review
- "The "Hurt Like Hell" EP is a strong offering from the London duo, keeping the tradition of UK house music alive while adding a fresh modern take on production."
  — The Kollection
- "From its warped melodies, rubber mallet beats, and swirling, psychedelic, electronic notes, 'Hurt Like Hell' is instantly recognisable as an addictive hit."
  — Air It

List of Antony & Cleopatra singles
Title	Year	Album
"Sirens"	2015	—N/a
"Take Me"	2015	—N/a
"Love Is A Lonely Dancer"	2016	—N/a
"Dust	2017	—N/a
"Twitch"	2017	—N/a
"The Islands"	2018	—N/a
"Hard Feelings" "Hurt Like Hell"	2018	"Hurt Like Hell" (EP)
"Why Don't You Just Call Me"	2019	—N/a

=== Live ===
The duo's first Australian tour was part of the 2017 Alison Wonderland's 'Scarehouse Project' alongside other acts such as Lunice, Lido, ASAP Ferg and Saatchi.

The next year they went on to play Australia's largest winter music festival Splendour In The Grass in July 2018.

=== Additional work ===
The duo have also provided vocals on:

Song	Artist	Year	Record	Label
"Slippin'"	Jaded x Black Caviar x Antony & Cleopatra	2019	Single	Hexagon (US), The Label (UK)
"The Future"	Motez (producer) x Antony & Cleopatra	2017	Single	Sweat it Out
"Careful Baby"	Nicky Night Time feat. Antony & Cleopatra	2016	Single	Sweat It Out
"Never Get to You"	Moonboots feat. Antony & Cleopatra	2016	Single	Anjunabeats
"Money Time"	Sammy Bananas feat. Antony & Cleopatra	2015	Single	Fools Gold
"The Tide"	Dreamtrak	2015	Single	Mermaid Avenue / Mom + Pop
"Givin' it Up"	Lanceleot feat. Antony & Cleopatra	2014	Single	Anjunadeep
"Protect"	Beni feat. Antony & Cleopatra	2014	Single	WIN/Modular
"Make Ends Meet"	Lancelot feat. Antony & Cleopatra	2014	Single	Anjunadeep

== Awards and nominations ==
=== APRA Awards ===
The APRA Awards are presented annually from 1982 by the Australasian Performing Right Association (APRA), "honouring composers and songwriters". They commenced in 1982.

Year	Nominee / work	Award	Result	Ref.
2012	"Act Your Age" – Bliss n Eso featuring Bluejuice (Alexander Burnett, Jeremy Craib, James Cibej, Jacob Stone, Stavros Yiannoukas, James Hauptmann)	Song of the Year	Shortlisted	
2014	"Act Your Age" – Bliss n Eso featuring Bluejuice	Urban Work of the Year	Won	
2026	"I'm a Boxer" (Brad Cox / Alexander Burnett)	Most Performed Country Work of the Year	Nominated	

=== ARIA Music Awards ===
The ARIA Music Awards is an annual awards ceremony that recognises excellence, innovation, and achievement across all genres of Australian music. They commenced in 1987.

Year	Nominee / work	Award	Result	Ref.
2025	Alex Burnett for Thelma Plum – I'm Sorry, Now Say It Back	Best Produced Release	Nominated	
