= Clumsy Love =

Single by Thelma Plum

from the album Better in Blak
- Released: 13 July 2018
- Genre: Folk-pop; indie pop
- Length: 3:07
- Label: Mosy Recordings, Warner Music Australia
- Songwriters: Thelma Plum; Alexander Burnett
- Producer: Alexander Burnett

Thelma Plum singles chronology
"Clair de Lune" (2018)	"Clumsy Love" (2018)	"Not Angry Anymore" (2019)

"Clumsy Love" is a song by Australian singer/songwriter Thelma Plum, released on 13 July 2018 as the lead single from Plum's debut studio album Better in Blak (2019). In Triple J's Hottest 100 of 2018, the song was voted in at number 79. The song was certified platinum in Australia in 2020.

== Background ==
Upon release, Plum told Triple J that she "had gone through a little bit of a rough patch, and I guess this is kind of a reflection of me going through that time and not always feeling backed 100 percent." She also told Music Feeds: "The year just gone [2017] has been a really rough one for me and 'Clumsy Love' is my reflections on that and I have to say I am far happier with the song than with the memories."

== Reception ==
Shaad D'Souza from Vice Magazine said "'Clumsy Love' showcases the warmth in Plum's voice, underpinning it with handclaps and tambourine. Despite the track's wispy production, Plum's songwriting still cuts deep."

Thomas Bleach called the song "shiny" and "quirky", describing it as "deliver[ing] a [sic] euphoric layered with a very emotional and reflective storyline" and as "bold and exciting".

auspOp described the song as "an addictive little indie pop gem" and said the song has a "gorgeously sunshiney gloss".

== Music video ==
The music video was directed by Claudia Sangiorgi Dalimore and released on 15 August 2018.

== Track listings ==
Digital download
No.	Title	Length
1.	"Clumsy Love"	3:07

Digital download — Remix
No.	Title	Length
1.	"Clumsy Love" (St. South Remix)	2:49

Digital download — Acoustic version
No.	Title	Length
1.	"Clumsy Love" (acoustic)	3:05
2.	"Clumsy Love" (original)	3:07

== Certifications ==
Region	Certification	Certified units/sales
Australia (ARIA)	2× Platinum	140,000^{‡}
^{‡} Sales+streaming figures based on certification alone.
