= Better in Blak (song) =

Single by Thelma Plum

from the album Better in Blak
- Released: 26 April 2019
- Length: 3:12
- Label: Mosy Recordings, Sony Music Australia
- Songwriters: Thelma Plum; Alexander Burnett; Oli Horton
- Producer: Alexander Burnett

Thelma Plum singles chronology
"Not Angry Anymore" (2019)	"Better in Blak" (2019)	"Homecoming Queen" (2019)

"Better in Blak" is a song by Australian singer/songwriter Thelma Plum, released on 26 April 2019 as the third single from her debut studio album of the same name.

In July 2019, "Better in Blak" was nominated for Film Clip of the Year at the National Indigenous Music Awards. At the ARIA Music Awards of 2019, "Better in Blak" was nominated for Best Videos. At the J Awards of 2019, the song was nominated for Australian Video of the Year. At the APRA Music Awards of 2020, "Better in Blak" was nominated for Song of the Year. The song won the 2020 Vanda & Young Global Songwriting Competition. In 2025, the song placed 53 on the Triple J Hottest 100 of Australian Songs.

== Background ==
Upon release, Plum said: "I wrote 'Better in Blak' about my experiences with people trying to take the colour from the conversation. My colour is an important part of who I am, and over the last couple of years I've had people try and tell me 'it's not about colour' when obviously to me it is."

== Reception ==
Laura English from Music Feeds wrote: "The track is all about the frustrating experiences Plum faces as a Gamilaraay woman and musician", describing it as "an emotional, cathartic song that sees honest lyrics coupled with upbeat, danceable beats".

== Music video ==
The music video was directed by Claudia Sangiorgi Dalimore and released on 28 May 2019. It was nominated for Best Video at the ARIA Music Awards of 2019.

== Track listing ==
Digital download
No.	Title	Length
1.	"Better in Blak"	3:12

== Charts ==
Chart performance for "Better in Blak"
Chart (2020)	Peak position
Australia (ARIA)	89

== Certifications ==
Region	Certification	Certified units/sales
Australia (ARIA)	2× Platinum	140,000^{‡}
^{‡} Sales+streaming figures based on certification alone.
