= ARIA Award for Best Pop Release =

Annual Australian music industry award

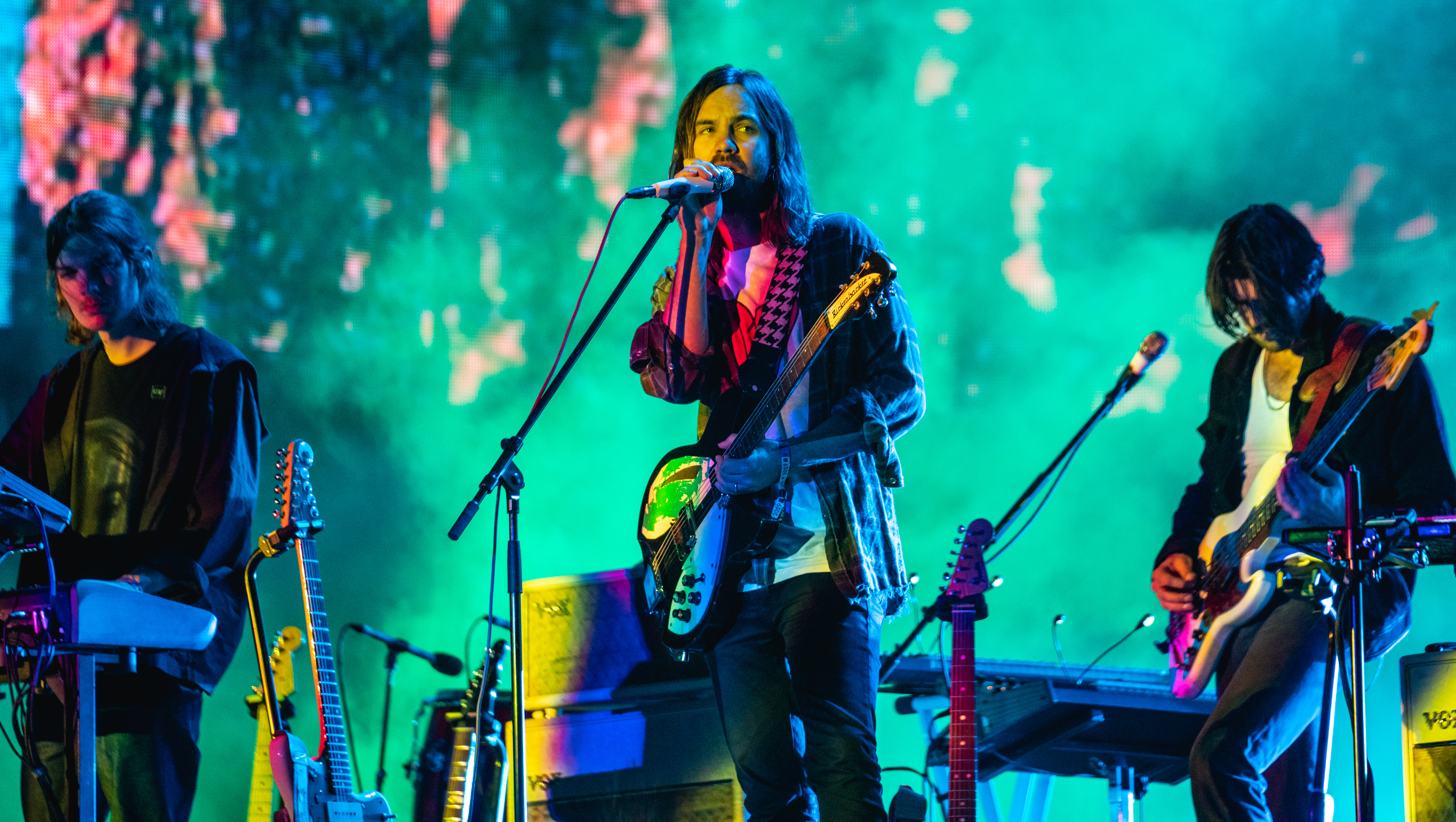
- 2026 winner Tame Impala
- Country: Australia
- Presented by: Australian Recording Industry Association (ARIA)
- First award: 1994
- Currently held by: Tame Impala, "Dracula" (2026)

Highlights
- Most wins: Kylie Minogue (5)
- Most nominations: Kylie Minogue (14)
- Website: ariaawards.com.au

The ARIA Music Award for Best Pop Release is an award presented at the annual ARIA Music Awards, which recognises "the many achievements of Aussie artists across all music genres", since 1987. It is handed out by the Australian Recording Industry Association (ARIA), an organisation whose aim is "to advance the interests of the Australian record industry." To be eligible, "the recording must be directed at contemporary hit radio or Top 40 formats." The accolade is voted for by a judging academy, which comprises 1000 members from different areas of the music industry, and is given to an artist who is either from Australia or an Australian resident.

The award for Best Pop Release was first presented to Peter Andre in 1994, for his album of the same name. Kylie Minogue has received five wins from 14 nominations, more than any other artist, for "Where the Wild Roses Grow" (with Nick Cave and the Bad Seeds) in 1996, "Spinning Around" in 2000, the latter's parent album Light Years in 2001, Fever in 2002 and "Padam Padam" in 2023. Vance Joy and Jessica Mauboy are tied for the most nominations without a win with four each. Five artists have won in consecutive years; Minogue from 2000 to 2002, Missy Higgins for "Scar" in 2004 and its parent album The Sound of White in 2005, Gotye for "Somebody That I Used to Know" featuring Kimbra in 2011 and its parent album Making Mirrors in 2012, Amy Shark for Night Thinker in 2017 and Love Monster in 2018, and The Kid Laroi for "Stay" with Justin Bieber in 2021 and "Thousand Miles" in 2022. Gotye is the only artist to win both his nominations.

== Winners and nominees ==
In the following table, the winner is highlighted in a separate colour, and in boldface; the nominees are those that are not highlighted or in boldface.

Winner marked in a separate colour

Year	Winner(s)	Album/single title
**1994** (8th)
**1994** (8th)	**Peter Andre**	**Peter Andre**
**1994** (8th)	Bellydance	One Blood
**1994** (8th)	Girlfriend	It's Up to You
**1994** (8th)	Sound Unlimited	"One More From the City"
**1994** (8th)	Toni Pearen	"I Want You"
**1995** (9th)
**1995** (9th)	**Tina Arena**	**"Chains"**
**1995** (9th)	Kulcha	Kulcha
**1995** (9th)	Mental As Anything	"Mr Natural"
**1995** (9th)	Merril Bainbridge	"Mouth"
**1995** (9th)	Tlot Tlot	"The Girlfriend Song"
**1996** (10th)
**1996** (10th)	**Nick Cave and the Bad Seeds** and **Kylie Minogue**	**"Where the Wild Roses Grow"**
**1996** (10th)	Christine Anu	"Come On"
**1996** (10th)	Hoodoo Gurus	Blue Cave
**1996** (10th)	Swoop	The Woxo Principle
**1996** (10th)	Tina Arena	"Wasn't It Good"
**1997** (11th)
**1997** (11th)	**Savage Garden**	**"To the Moon and Back"**
**1997** (11th)	Deni Hines	"I'm Not in Love"
**1997** (11th)	Human Nature	Telling Everybody
**1997** (11th)	Rani	Always on My Mind
**1997** (11th)	Snout	The New Pop Dialogue
**1998** (12th)
**1998** (12th)	**Natalie Imbruglia**	**Left of the Middle**
**1998** (12th)	Kylie Minogue	Impossible Princess
**1998** (12th)	The Mavis's	Pink Pills
**1998** (12th)	Snout	Circle High and Wide
**1998** (12th)	The Whitlams	Eternal Nightcap
**1999** (13th)
**1999** (13th)	**Savage Garden**	**"The Animal Song"**
**1999** (13th)	Bachelor Girl	Waiting for the Day
**1999** (13th)	Deadstar	"Run Baby Run"
**1999** (13th)	Human Nature	Counting Down
**1999** (13th)	Taxiride	"Get Set"
**2000** (14th)
**2000** (14th)	**Kylie Minogue**	**"Spinning Around"**
**2000** (14th)	Frenzal Rhomb	"Never Had So Much Fun"
**2000** (14th)	Savage Garden	Affirmation
**2000** (14th)	Spiderbait	"Glokenpop"
**2000** (14th)	Vanessa Amorosi	Absolutely Everybody
**2001** (15th)
**2001** (15th)	**Kylie Minogue**	**Light Years**
**2001** (15th)	Christine Anu	Come My Way
**2001** (15th)	Invertigo	"Chances Are"
**2001** (15th)	Madison Avenue	The Polyester Embassy
**2001** (15th)	Vanessa Amorosi	The Power
**2002** (16th)
**2002** (16th)	**Kylie Minogue**	**Fever**
**2002** (16th)	Disco Montego	"Beautiful"
**2002** (16th)	George	Polyserena
**2002** (16th)	Holly Valance	"Kiss Kiss"
**2002** (16th)	The Whitlams	Torch the Moon
**2003** (17th)
**2003** (17th)	**Delta Goodrem**	**Innocent Eyes**
**2003** (17th)	Amiel	Audio Out
**2003** (17th)	The Androids	"Do It with Madonna"
**2003** (17th)	Dannii Minogue	Neon Nights
**2003** (17th)	Kylie Minogue	"Come Into My World"
**2004** (18th)
**2004** (18th)	**Missy Higgins**	**"Scar"**
**2004** (18th)	Delta Goodrem	"Not Me, Not I"
**2004** (18th)	Kylie Minogue	Body Language
**2004** (18th)	Pete Murray	"So Beautiful"
**2004** (18th)	The Dissociatives	The Dissociatives
**2005** (19th)
**2005** (19th)	**Missy Higgins**	**The Sound of White**
**2005** (19th)	Ben Lee	Awake Is the New Sleep
**2005** (19th)	Kylie Minogue	"I Believe in You"
**2005** (19th)	Sarah Blasko	The Overture & the Underscore
**2005** (19th)	Thirsty Merc	"Someday, Someday"
**2006** (20th)
**2006** (20th)	**The Veronicas**	**The Secret Life of...**
**2006** (20th)	Ben Lee	"Into the Dark"
**2006** (20th)	Josh Pyke	Feeding the Wolves
**2006** (20th)	Rogue Traders	Here Come the Drums
**2006** (20th)	Shannon Noll	Lift
**2007** (21st)
**2007** (21st)	**Sarah Blasko**	**What the Sea Wants, the Sea Will Have**
**2007** (21st)	Evermore	"Light Surrounding You"
**2007** (21st)	Kate Miller-Heidke	Little Eve
**2007** (21st)	Missy Higgins	On a Clear Night
**2007** (21st)	Operator Please	"Just a Song About Ping Pong"
**2008** (22nd)
**2008** (22nd)	**Gabriella Cilmi**	**Lessons to Be Learned**
**2008** (22nd)	Kylie Minogue	X
**2008** (22nd)	Operator Please	Yes Yes Vindictive
**2008** (22nd)	Sam Sparro	"Black and Gold"
**2008** (22nd)	The Veronicas	Hook Me Up
**2009** (23rd)
**2009** (23rd)	**Empire of the Sun**	**Walking on a Dream**
**2009** (23rd)	Jessica Mauboy	Been Waiting
**2009** (23rd)	Kate Miller-Heidke	Curiouser
**2009** (23rd)	Ladyhawke	Ladyhawke
**2009** (23rd)	Sarah Blasko	As Day Follows Night
**2010** (24th)
**2010** (24th)	**Sia**	**We Are Born**
**2010** (24th)	Bluejuice	Head of the Hawk
**2010** (24th)	Empire of the Sun	"Half Mast (Slight Return)"
**2010** (24th)	Guy Sebastian	Like It Like That
**2010** (24th)	Kylie Minogue	Aphrodite
**2011** (25th)
**2011** (25th)	**Gotye** featuring **Kimbra**	**"Somebody That I Used to Know"**
**2011** (25th)	Architecture in Helsinki	Moment Bends
**2011** (25th)	Guy Sebastian featuring Eve	"Who's That Girl"
**2011** (25th)	Gypsy & the Cat	Gilgamesh
**2011** (25th)	Washington	"Holy Moses"
**2012** (26th)
**2012** (26th)	**Gotye**	**Making Mirrors**
**2012** (26th)	Guy Sebastian featuring Lupe Fiasco	"Battle Scars"
**2012** (26th)	Jessica Mauboy	"Gotcha"
**2012** (26th)	Kimbra	Vows
**2012** (26th)	San Cisco	Awkward
**2013** (27th)
**2013** (27th)	**Guy Sebastian**	**Armageddon**
**2013** (27th)	Empire of the Sun	Ice on the Dune
**2013** (27th)	San Cisco	San Cisco
**2013** (27th)	The Preatures	Is This How You Feel?
**2013** (27th)	Vance Joy	God Loves You When You're Dancing
**2014** (28th)
**2014** (28th)	**Sia**	**1000 Forms of Fear**
**2014** (28th)	5 Seconds of Summer	5 Seconds of Summer
**2014** (28th)	Andy Bull	Sea of Approval
**2014** (28th)	Justice Crew	"Que Sera"
**2014** (28th)	Sheppard	Bombs Away
**2015** (29th)
**2015** (29th)	**Jarryd James**	**"Do You Remember"**
**2015** (29th)	Conrad Sewell	"Start Again"
**2015** (29th)	Sia	"Elastic Heart"
**2015** (29th)	Tame Impala	"Let It Happen"
**2015** (29th)	Vance Joy	Dream Your Life Away
**2016** (30th)
**2016** (30th)	**Flume**	**"Never Be Like You"** (featuring Kai)
**2016** (30th)	Illy	"Papercuts" (featuring Vera Blue)
**2016** (30th)	Sia	This Is Acting
**2016** (30th)	The Veronicas	"In My Blood"
**2016** (30th)	Troye Sivan	Blue Neighbourhood
**2017** (31st)
**2017** (31st)	**Amy Shark**	**Night Thinker**
**2017** (31st)	Dean Lewis	"Waves"
**2017** (31st)	Jessica Mauboy	"Fallin'"
**2017** (31st)	Sia	"The Greatest" (featuring Kendrick Lamar)
**2017** (31st)	Vera Blue	Perennial
**2018** (32nd)
**2018** (32nd)	**Amy Shark**	**Love Monster**
**2018** (32nd)	5 Seconds of Summer	Youngblood
**2018** (32nd)	Dean Lewis	"Be Alright"
**2018** (32nd)	Jack River	Sugar Mountain
**2018** (32nd)	Troye Sivan	Bloom
**2019** (33rd)
**2019** (33rd)	**Tones and I**	**"Dance Monkey"**
**2019** (33rd)	Amy Shark	"Mess Her Up"
**2019** (33rd)	Dean Lewis	A Place We Knew
**2019** (33rd)	Guy Sebastian	"Choir"
**2019** (33rd)	Thelma Plum	Better in Blak
**2020** (34th)
**2020** (34th)	**Amy Shark**	**"Everybody Rise"**
**2020** (34th)	Lime Cordiale	14 Steps to a Better You
**2020** (34th)	Sia	"Together"
**2020** (34th)	Tame Impala	"Lost in Yesterday"
**2020** (34th)	Troye Sivan	In a Dream
**2021** (35th)
**2021** (35th)	**The Kid Laroi** & **Justin Bieber**	**"Stay"**
**2021** (35th)	Amy Shark	Cry Forever
**2021** (35th)	The Avalanches	We Will Always Love You
**2021** (35th)	Tones and I	"Fly Away"
**2021** (35th)	Vance Joy	"Missing Piece"
**2022** (36th)
**2022** (36th)	**The Kid Laroi**	**"Thousand Miles"**
**2022** (36th)	Flume	"Say Nothing" (featuring May-a)
**2022** (36th)	Rüfüs Du Sol	"On My Knees"
**2022** (36th)	Thelma Plum	Meanjin
**2022** (36th)	Vance Joy	"Clarity"
**2023** (37th)
**2023** (37th)	**Kylie Minogue**	**"Padam Padam"**
**2023** (37th)	Amy Shark	"Can I Shower at Yours"
**2023** (37th)	Budjerah	"Therapy"
**2023** (37th)	Peach PRC	"Perfect for You"
**2023** (37th)	Troye Sivan	"Rush"
**2024** (38th)
**2024** (38th)	**Troye Sivan**	**Something to Give Each Other**
**2024** (38th)	Amy Shark	Sunday Sadness
**2024** (38th)	Jessica Mauboy	Yours Forever
**2024** (38th)	Kylie Minogue	Tension
**2024** (38th)	The Kid Laroi	"Girls"
**2025** (39th)
**2025** (39th)	**Thelma Plum**	**I'm Sorry, Now Say It Back**
**2025** (39th)	G Flip	"Disco Cowgirl"
**2025** (39th)	Kita Alexander	"Press Pause"
**2025** (39th)	Kylie Minogue	Tension II
**2025** (39th)	Mallrat	Light Hit My Face Like a Straight Right
**2026** (40th)
**2026** (40th)	**Tame Impala**	**"Dracula"**
**2026** (40th)	Blusher	"Rager"
**2026** (40th)	G Flip	Dream Ride
**2026** (40th)	Kylie Minogue	Tension Tour//Live 2025
**2026** (40th)	Troye Sivan	"She's the Best"

== Artists with multiple wins ==
5 wins

- Kylie Minogue

3 wins

- Amy Shark

2 wins

- Gotye
- Missy Higgins
- The Kid Laroi
- Savage Garden
- Sia

== Artists with multiple nominations ==
14 nominations

- Kylie Minogue

7 nominations

- Amy Shark

6 nominations

- Sia
- Troye Sivan

5 nominations

- Guy Sebastian

4 nominations

- Vance Joy
- Jessica Mauboy

3 nominations

- Sarah Blasko
- Empire of the Sun
- Missy Higgins
- The Kid Laroi
- Dean Lewis
- Thelma Plum
- Savage Garden
- Tame Impala
- The Veronicas

2 nominations

- 5 Seconds of Summer
- Vanessa Amorosi
- Christine Anu
- Tina Arena
- Vera Blue
- Delta Goodrem
- G Flip
- Flume
- Gotye
- Human Nature
- Kimbra
- Ben Lee
- Kate Miller-Heidke
- Operator Please
- San Cisco
- Snout
- Tones and I
- The Whitlams
