= Adulthood (album) =

Studio album by CocknBullKid
- Released: 20 May 2011
- Recorded: Snap & The Ivory Tower; RAK Studios; Indieking Studios; The Sample Factory
- Genre: Pop, indie pop, synthpop
- Label: Island
- Producer: Liam Howe, Gonzales, Peter Morén, Tobias Fröberg, Future Cut, Joseph Mount

CocknBullKid chronology
| Querelle (2009) | Adulthood (2011) | Adolescence (2012) |

Singles from Adulthood
- 1. "One Eye Closed" Released: 4 November 2010; 2. "Hold On to Your Misery" Released: 14 January 2011; 3. "Asthma Attack" Released: 8 April 2011; 4. "Yellow" Released: 5 August 2011

Adulthood is the debut album by British singer CocknBullKid. It was released in the United Kingdom on 20 May 2011 by Island Records.

== Track listing ==
| No. | Title | Writer(s) | Producer(s) | Length |
|---|---|---|---|---|
| 1. | "Adulthood" | Anita Blay; Peter Morén; Tobias Fröberg | Morén; Fröberg | 3:37 |
| 2. | "CockNBullKid" | Blay; Jason Beck | Liam Howe; Chilly Gonzales^{[a]} | 3:40 |
| 3. | "Hold On to Your Misery" | Blay; Beck | Howe; Chilly Gonzales^{[a]} | 3:14 |
| 4. | "Yellow" | Blay; Howe; Hannah Robinson | Howe | 3:08 |
| 5. | "One Eye Closed" | Blay; Joe Cross | Howe; Cross | 4:04 |
| 6. | "Distractions" | Blay; Tunde Babalola; Darren Lewis; Shaznay Lewis | Future Cut | 3:46 |
| 7. | "Bellyache" | Blay; Mark-Anthony Tieku | Howe | 3:20 |
| 8. | "Mexico" | Blay; Beck; Howe | Howe | 2:39 |
| 9. | "Asthma Attack" | Blay; Beck | Howe | 4:02 |
| 10. | "The Hoarder" | Blay; Howe; Robinson | Howe | 3:35 |
| 11. | "Dumb" | Blay; Joseph Mount | Howe; Mount | 5:34 |
| 12. | "I Deserve It" | Blay; Lou Vainglorious; Nick Pini; Tim Goalen | Howe | 3:15 |

iTunes deluxe edition bonus tracks
| No. | Title | Writer(s) | Producer(s) | Length |
|---|---|---|---|---|
| 13. | "Happy Birthday" | Blay | Howe | 2:58 |
| 14. | "Hold On to Your Misery" (Hercules and Love Affair Remix) | | | 6:55 |
| 15. | "Asthma Attack" (WAWA Remix) | | | 3:11 |
| 16. | "One Eye Closed" (video) | | | 4:13 |
| 17. | "Hold On to Your Misery" (video) | | | 3:20 |
| 18. | "Asthma Attack" (video) | | | 3:34 |
