= I'm Sorry, Now Say It Back =

Studio album by Thelma Plum
- Released: 18 October 2024
- Length: 35:25
- Label: Warner Australia
- Producers: Alex Burnett; Xavier Dunn; Georgia Flipo; Oli Horton

Thelma Plum chronology
Meanjin (2022)	I'm Sorry, Now Say It Back (2024)

Singles from I'm Sorry, Now Say It Back
- 1. "We Don't Talk About It" Released: 24 November 2023; 2. "Nobody's Baby" Released: 26 July 2024; 3. "Freckles" Released: 23 August 2024

I'm Sorry, Now Say It Back is the second studio album by Australian singer-songwriter Thelma Plum. The album was released on 18 October 2024 through Warner Music Australia.

Upon announcement on 22 August 2024, Plum said that it was "created with love, heartache, forgiveness and care in mind. It's personal and kind of like I'm sharing pages from my diary with you, but it's time for it to fly free."

The album was supported by a 10-date Australian tour in October and November 2024.

In May 2025, Plum will support the album with an 18-date regional Australian tour.

At the 2025 ARIA Music Awards, the album won Best Pop Release and was nominated for Album of the Year, Best Solo Artist, Best Cover Art and Best Produced Release.

== Critical reception ==
Professional ratings
Review scores
Source	Rating
The Guardian	3/5 stars

Giselle Au-Nhien Nguyen from The Guardian said "The Gamilaraay musician's second album is filled with light and shade, resilience and humour – though it doesn't quite match the highs of her debut."

AAA Backstage said the album "showcases Thelma's growth as an artist and storyteller, weaving together tales of heartbreak, love, and personal reflection."

Lars Brandle from Rolling Stone Australia said "On her second album, I'm Sorry, Now Say It Back, Plum finds that sweet balance, by unspooling lyrics full of raw honesty, humanity laid bare, delivered in her unmistakable, vibrato-hewn voice and soundtracked with studio polish, strings, and delicious melodies".

Jeff Jenkins from Stack Magazine said "I'm Sorry, Now Say it Back is the sound of a young woman who's very much in charge, but not afraid to share her vulnerabilities."

Triple J said "Each track serves as a journal entry of her raw emotion that's been condensed into catchy indie folk pop for self-acceptance and pulling yourself up by the bootstraps."

== Track listing ==
All tracks are written by Thelma Plum, Alex Burnett, and Oli Horton, except where noted.

I'm Sorry, Now Say It Back track listing
No.	Title	Length
1.	"Wiseman"	3:12
2.	"Hurricane" (Plum, Georgia Flipo, Aidan Hogg)	3:10
3.	"Freckles"	2:59
4.	"Cowboy in the Rain"	3:13
5.	"Golden Touch"	2:54
6.	"Nobody's Baby" (Plum, Burnett)	2:35
7.	"Koala"	3:49
8.	"We Don't Talk About It"	2:52
9.	"All the Pretty Little Horses"	2:24
10.	"Guwop" (Plum)	2:58
11.	"The Love I Want"	2:45
12.	"I Don't Play That Song Anymore"	2:34
Total length:		35:25

== Personnel ==
Musicians

- Thelma Plum – vocals (all tracks), backing vocals (tracks 1, 3–5, 7–12), organ (1), piano (4), Rhodes piano (8), piano (10)
- Alex Burnett – bass guitar (tracks 1, 3, 4, 7, 8, 10), acoustic guitar (1, 3, 4, 8–12), additional backing vocals (1, 4, 8, 11), electric guitar (3, 4, 7–10, 12), cello (5), baritone guitar (7, 11), percussion (9)
- Oli Horton – drum programming (tracks 1, 3, 4, 7–10, 12), piano (1, 3, 5, 7, 11), synthesizer (1, 4, 8, 9, 11), percussion (3, 4, 7, 8, 10), bass guitar (5, 11), Mellotron (7, 9), glockenspiel (8); organ, synthesizer programming (10); piano (11, 12), drums (11)
- Grant Gerathy – drums (track 1)
- Aidan Hogg – bass, guitar, piano, programming, synthesizer (track 2)
- Georgia Flipo – drums, percussion, piano, synthesizer (track 2)
- Charles Finn – drums (tracks 3, 7)
- Monica Sottile – backing vocals (track 3)
- The Letter String Quartet – string quartet (track 3)
- Dan Williams – drums (tracks 4, 10, 12)
- Xavier Dunn – synthesizer (track 5)
- Tim McArtney – bass guitar (tracks 9, 12)
- Leon Weber – strings (track 12)

Technical

- Brian Lucey – mastering
- Alex Burnett – mixing (tracks 1, 3, 4, 7–12)
- Oli Horton – mixing (tracks 1, 3, 4, 7–12
- Simon Cohen – mixing (tracks 2, 5, 6), recording (1, 2, 4–12)
- Jem Savage – recording (track 3)
- Biddy Connor – string arrangement (track 3)

== Charts ==
Chart performance for I'm Sorry, Now Say It Back
Chart (2024)	Peak position
Australian Albums (ARIA)	7
