= J Awards of 2019 =

Annual Australian music awards

- Date: 21 November 2019
- Venue: Australia
- Website: abc.net.au/triplej

The J Award of 2019 is the fifteenth annual J Awards, established by the Australian Broadcasting Corporation's youth-focused radio station Triple J. The announcement comes at the culmination of Ausmusic Month (November). A new award was added in 2019, You Done Good Award. This was added to the existing four awards; Australian Album of the Year, Double J Artist of the Year, Australian Music Video of the Year and Unearthed Artist of the Year.

The eligible period took place between November 2018 and October 2019. The winners were announced live on air on Triple J on Thursday 21 November 2019.

== Awards ==
=== Australian Album of the Year ===
Artist	Album Title	Result
Matt Corby	Rainbow Valley	Won
G Flip	About Us	Nominated
Hatchie	Keepsake	Nominated
Hayden James	Between Us	Nominated
Hilltop Hoods	The Great Expanse	Nominated
Holy Holy	My Own Pool of Light	Nominated
Northlane	Alien	Nominated
Sampa the Great	The Return	Nominated
Stella Donnelly	Beware of the Dogs	Nominated
Thelma Plum	Better in Blak	Nominated

=== Double J Artist of the Year ===
Artist	Result
Sampa the Great	Won
Nick Cave	Nominated
Julia Jacklin	Nominated
King Gizzard and the Lizard Wizard	Nominated
The Teskey Brothers	Nominated

=== Australian Video of the Year ===
Director	Artist and Song	Result
Sanjay De Silva	Sampa The Great - "Final Form"	Won
Dylan River	Briggs featuring Greg Holden - "Life Is Incredible"	Nominated
Jonathan Zawada	Flume- "Hi This Is Flume"	Nominated
Matt Weston	The Chats - "Identity Theft"	Nominated
Claudia Sangiorgi Dalimore	Thelma Plum - "Better in Blak"	Nominated

=== Unearthed Artist of the Year ===
Artist	Result
Tones and I	Won
Adrian Eagle	Nominated
The Chats	Nominated
George Alice	Nominated
Spacey Jane	Nominated

=== You Done Good Award ===
An award to an Australian who has "made an impact on the industry through outstanding achievement, social change or altruistic endeavours".

Artist	Notes	Result
Heidi Lenffer	For launching renewable energy initiative FEAT.	Won
Dylan Alcott	For making music accessible to everyone at Ability Fest.	Nominated
National Indigenous Music Awards	For championing incredible Indigenous artists at their biggest event yet.	Nominated
Harry the Poo Roadie	For putting his life on hold to rescue one of Australia's most loved bands via faecal donations.	Nominated
Sarah Aarons	For a stand-out year co-writing multiple global hits for Khalid, Ruel, Peking Duk and more.	Nominated
