= Thelma Plum =

Indigenous Australian musician (born 1994)

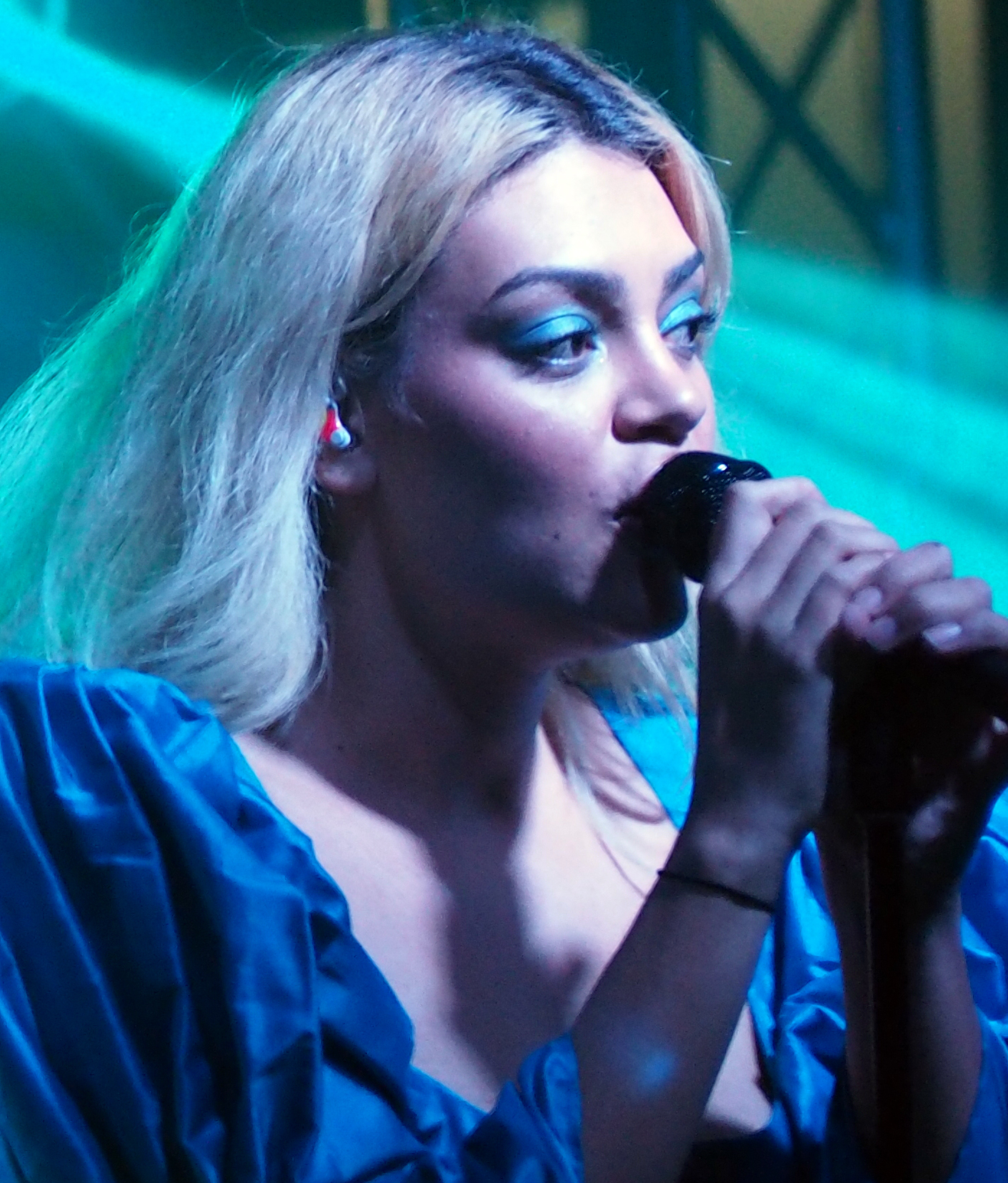
- Thelma Plum performing in April 2023

Background information
- Born: Thelma Amelina Plumbe; 21 December 1994 (age 31); Brisbane, Queensland, Australia
- Origin: Delungra, New South Wales, Australia
- Genre: Folk
- Occupations: Singer; songwriter; guitarist; musician
- Instruments: Vocals; guitar
- Years active: 2012–present
- Labels: Footstomp; Warner Music Australia
- Website: thelmaplum.com

Thelma Amelina Plumbe (born 21 December 1994), known professionally as Thelma Plum, is an Aboriginal Australian (Gamilaraay) singer, songwriter, guitarist and musician from Delungra, New South Wales. Her debut album, Better in Blak, was released on 30 July 2019 and peaked at number 4 on the ARIA Albums Chart.

Plum has received various accolades, including for Best Cover Art at the 2019 ARIA Music Awards for Dennis Pfitzner's artwork.

== Early life ==
Thelma Amelina Plumbe was born on 21 December 1994 in Brisbane. She is a Gamilaraay woman from Delungra, New South Wales. Plum graduated from the Music Industry College, Brisbane and spent most of her early life in that city.

== Career ==
=== 2012–2017: Triple J Unearthed and early EPs ===
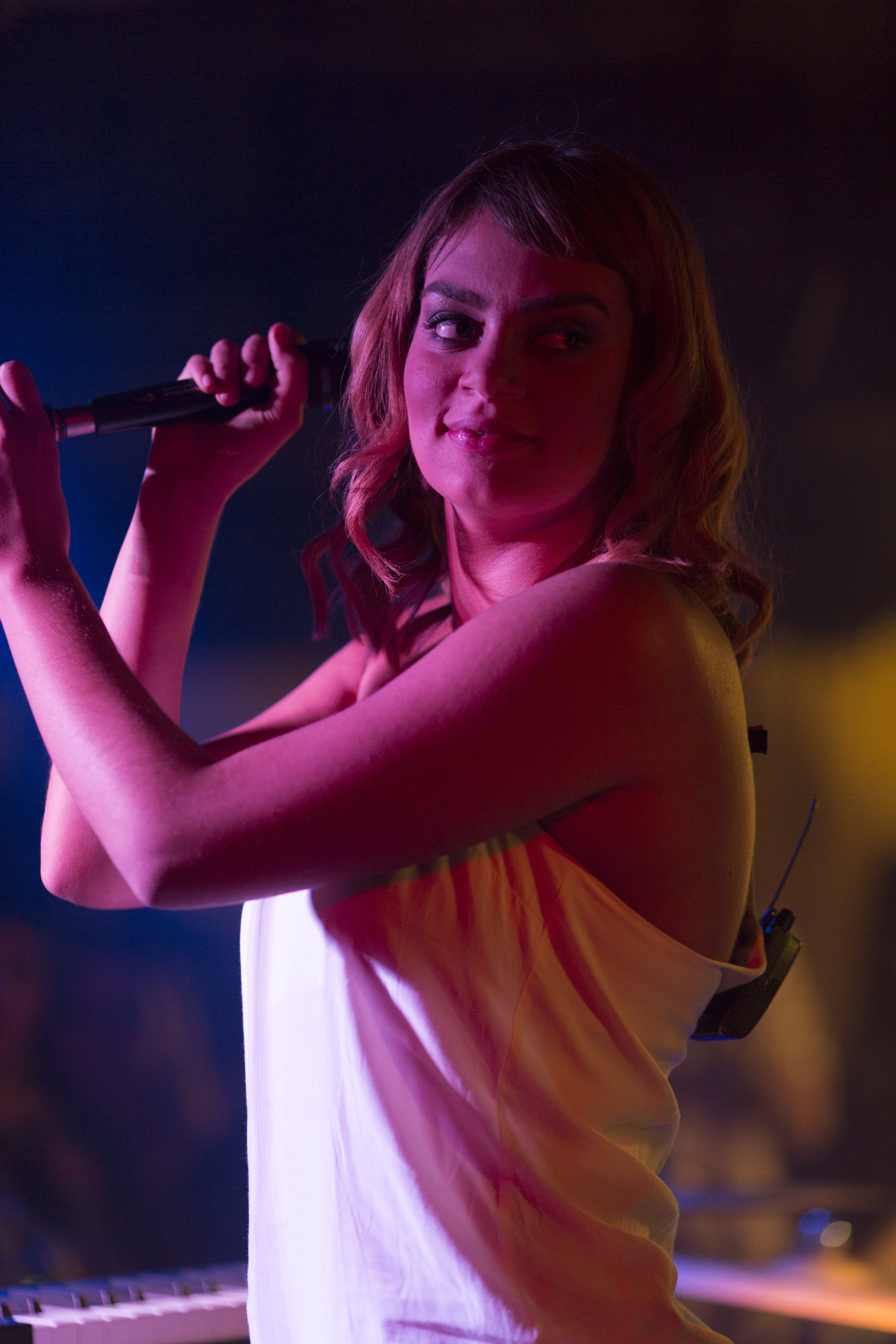
Plum in 2016

In May 2012, Plum uploaded the tracks "Blackbird" and "Father Said" onto Triple J Unearthed and in July 2012, won the inaugural Triple J's National Indigenous Unearthed Music competition and was nominated for a Deadly award for Most Promising New Talent. "Father Said" was released in November 2012 as her official debut single. Plum released her debut extended play, Rosie, in March 2013 and followed with her second EP, Monsters (July 2014). By that time she had relocated to Melbourne.

Plum appeared at Womadelaide in 2014 and 2019, has toured around Australia and has been on rotation nationally on Triple J.

=== 2018–2021: Better in Blak ===
Plum released her debut album, Better in Blak, in July 2019. The video for the single, "Better in Blak", was nominated for Film Clip of the Year at the National Indigenous Music Awards. In October 2019 she came at No. 7 in Happy Mag's list of "The 15 Australian female artists changing the game right now". At the ARIA Music Awards of 2019 she received six nominations and won Best Cover Art for Emilie Pfitzner's work on her album.

The Better in Blak album became a collection of anthems for Blak women.

In January 2020, Plum became the highest ranking Indigenous artist ever in the Triple J Hottest 100, when "Better in Blak" was voted in at number 9. Two months later, she was diagnosed with COVID-19 during the COVID-19 pandemic.

In May 2020, Plum released a cover of Powderfinger's "These Days". In October, she performed at the 2020 AFL Grand Final.

=== 2022–2023: Meanjin and When Rosie Met Monsters ===
In July 2022, Plum announced her third EP, Meanjin, alongside its second single "When It Rains It Pours".

Meanjin is Plum's "love letter" to Brisbane and was written on her balcony in lockdown due to the global COVID-19 pandemic.

Plum's Meanjin EP won Album of the Year at the 2023 National Indigenous Music Awards.

In November 2022, Plum announced When Rosie Met Monsters, compiling the EPs Rosie and Monsters together on vinyl, CD and cassette.

=== 2024: I'm Sorry, Now Say It Back ===
In November 2023, Plum released "We Don't Talk About It", the first new music in over twelve months. Her second studio album I'm Sorry, Now Say It Back was released in October 2024.

== Discography ==
=== Studio albums ===
List of studio albums, with selected details about release date and label
Title	Details	Peak chart positions	Certifications
Title	Details	AUS	Certifications
Better in Blak	Released: 12 July 2019; Label: Warner Music Australia (5419704880); Formats: CD, digital download, LP, streaming	4	ARIA: Gold
I'm Sorry, Now Say It Back	Released: 18 October 2024; Label: Warner Music Australia; Formats: CD, digital download, LP, streaming	7	

=== Compilation albums ===
List of compilation albums, with selected details about release date and label
Title	Details
When Rosie Met Monsters	Released: 25 November 2022; Label: Warner Music Australia (5419740238); Formats: CD, digital download, LP, streaming; Note: Compiles EPs Rosie and Monsters

=== Extended plays ===
List of extended plays released, with selected details about release date and label
Title	Details	Peak chart positions
Title	Details	AUS
Rosie	Released: 15 March 2013; Label: Footstomp (STOMPER005); Formats: CD, digital download, streaming	—
Monsters	Released: 4 July 2014; Label: Warner Music Australia (5419626612); Formats: CD, digital download, streaming	—
Meanjin	Released: 12 August 2022; Label: Warner Music Australia (5419724168); Formats: CD, digital download, 10" LP, streaming	28

=== Singles ===
==== As lead artist ====
List of singles, with year released, selected chart positions, certifications, and album name shown
Title	Year	Peak chart positions		Certifications	Album
Title	Year	AUS	NZ Hot	Certifications	Album
"Father Said"	2012	—	—		Rosie
"Around Here"	2013	—	—		Rosie
"Dollar"	2013	—	—		Rosie
"How Much Does Your Love Cost" (original or Dugong Jr remix)	2014	—	—		Monsters
"Monsters"	2014	—	—		Monsters
"Young in Love"	2014	—	—		Monsters
"Any Other Name" (with Horrorshow, Jimblah, and Urthboy)	2015	—	—		Non-album singles
"Clair de Lune"	2018	—	—		Non-album singles
"Clumsy Love"	2018	—	—	ARIA: 2× Platinum	Better in Blak
"Not Angry Anymore"	2019	—	—		Better in Blak
"Better in Blak"	2019	89	—	ARIA: 2× Platinum	Better in Blak
"Homecoming Queen"	2019	—	—	ARIA: Platinum; RMNZ: Gold	Better in Blak
"These Days"	2020	—	—	ARIA: Gold	Non-album single
"Backseat of My Mind"	2022	—	40		Meanjin
"When It Rains It Pours"	2022	—	—		Meanjin
"The Brown Snake"	2022	—	—		Meanjin
"We Don't Talk About It"	2023	—	—		I'm Sorry, Now Say It Back
"Nobody's Baby"	2024	—	—		I'm Sorry, Now Say It Back
"Freckles"	2024	—	—		I'm Sorry, Now Say It Back
"Home Among the Gumtrees"	2024	—	—		Non-album single

==== As featured artist ====
List of singles as featured artist, with year released, selected chart positions
Title	Year	Peak chart positions	Album
Title	Year	AUS	Album
"No One" (Golden Features featuring Thelma Plum)	2015	58	XXIV (EP)
"Ticket to Heaven" (Alice Ivy featuring Thelma Plum)	2020	—	Don't Sleep
"Go to War" (Briggs featuring Thelma Plum)	2020	—	Always Was
"Thick Skin" (Baker Boy featuring Thelma Plum, Emma Donovan, Kee'Anh and Jada Weaze)	2025	—	Djandjay

=== Other charted songs ===
List of non-single chart appearances, with year released and album name shown
Title	Year	Peak chart positions	Album
Title	Year	NZ Hot	Album
"Don't Let a Good Girl Down"	2019	35	Better in Blak

=== Guest appearances ===
List of guest appearances, with year released and album name shown
Year	Song	Album
"Silk" (with Dustin Tebbutt)	2015	Home
"I C U" (with A.B. Original)	2016	Reclaim Australia (album)
"Darling St." (with Spit Syndicate)	2017	One Good Shirt Had Us All Fly
"Maddie's Lullaby"	2021	Back to the Outback
"I Love You Always Forever" and "Dancing in the Moonlight"	2026	My Brilliant Career

== Awards and nominations ==
=== APRA Awards ===
The APRA Awards are held in Australia and New Zealand by the Australasian Performing Right Association to recognise songwriting skills, sales and airplay performance by its members annually. Plum has been nominated for two awards.

Year	Nominee / work	Award	Result	Ref.
2020	"Better in Blak"	APRA Song of the Year	Nominated	
2020	herself	Breakthrough Songwriter of the Year	Nominated	
2021	herself	Breakthrough Songwriter of the Year	Nominated	
2023	"Backseat of My Mind"; Thelma Plum, Alexander Burnett, Oli Horton)	Song of the Year	Shortlisted	
2026	"Thick Skin" (Baker Boy featuring Thelma Plum, Emma Donovan, Kee'ahn & Jada Weazel) (Danzal Baker, Rob Amoruso, Kee'ahn Bindol, Emma Donovan, Thelma Plum, Pip Norman, Jada Weazel)	Song of the Year	Shortlisted	

=== ARIA Awards ===
The ARIA Music Awards is an annual awards ceremony that recognises excellence, innovation, and achievement across all genres of Australian music. Thelma Plum won an award from six nominations in 2019.

Year	Nominee / work	Award	Result	Ref.
2019	Emilie Pfitzner for Thelma Plum - Better in Blak	Best Cover Art	Won	
2019	Claudia Sangiorgi Dalimore for Thelma Plum – "Better in Blak"	Best Video	Nominated	
2019	Better in Blak	Album of the Year	Nominated	
2019	Better in Blak	Best Female Artist	Nominated	
2019	Better in Blak	Best Pop Release	Nominated	
2019	Better in Blak	Breakthrough Artist	Nominated	
2021	Thelma Plum – Homecoming Queen Tour	Best Australian Live Act	Nominated	
2022	Meanjin	Best Solo Artist	Nominated	
2022	Meanjin	Best Pop Release	Nominated	
2022	The Meanjin Tour	Best Australian Live Act	Nominated	
2025	I'm Sorry, Now Say It Back	Album of the Year	Nominated	
2025	I'm Sorry, Now Say It Back	Best Solo Artist	Nominated	
2025	I'm Sorry, Now Say It Back	Best Pop Release	Won	
2025	Alex Burnett for Thelma Plum – I'm Sorry, Now Say It Back	Best Produced Release	Nominated	
2025	Kira Puru and Em Jensen for Thelma Plum – I'm Sorry, Now Say It Back	Best Cover Art	Nominated	

=== Australian Music Prize ===
The Australian Music Prize (the AMP) is an annual award of $30,000 given to an Australian band or solo artist in recognition of the merit of an album released during the year of award.

Year	Nominee / work	Award	Result	Ref.
2019	Better in Blak	Album of the Year	Nominated	

=== Australian Women in Music Awards ===
The Australian Women in Music Awards is an annual event that celebrates outstanding women in the Australian Music Industry who have made significant and lasting contributions in their chosen field. They commenced in 2018.

Year	Nominee / work	Award	Result	Ref.
2019	Thelma Plum	Songwriter Award	Nominated	

=== J Awards ===
The J Awards are an annual series of Australian music awards that were established by the Australian Broadcasting Corporation's youth-focused radio station Triple J. They commenced in 2005.

Year	Nominee / work	Award	Result	Ref.
2012	herself	Unearthed Artist of the Year	Nominated	
2019	Better in Blak	Australian Album of the Year	Nominated	
2019	"Better in Blak"	Australian Video of the Year	Nominated	

=== National Indigenous Music Awards ===
The National Indigenous Music Awards (NIMAs) is an annual awards ceremony that recognises the achievements of Indigenous Australians in music. Thelma Plum has won two awards.

Year	Nominee / work	Award	Result	Ref.
2013	Thelma Plum	Best New Talent	Won	
2015	"How Much Does Your Love Cost?"	Song of the Year	Won	
2019	Better in Blak	Album of the Year	Nominated	
2019	"Better in Blak"	Song of the Year	Nominated	
2020	Thelma Plum	Artist of the Year	Nominated	
2020	"Homecoming Queen"	Song of the Year	Nominated	
2022	Thelma Plum	Artist of the Year	Nominated	
2022	"Backseat of My Mind"	Song of the Year	Nominated	
2023	Meanjin (EP)	Album of the Year	Won	
2023	"The Brown Snake"	Film Clip of the Year	Nominated	
2026	"Thick Skin" by Baker Boy (featuring Thelma Plum, Emma Donovan, Kee'Ahn & Jada Weazel)	Song of the Year	Won	
2026	"Thick Skin" by Baker Boy (featuring Thelma Plum, Emma Donovan, Kee'Ahn & Jada Weazel)	Film Clip of the Year	Won	

=== National Live Music Awards ===
The National Live Music Awards (NLMAs) are a broad recognition of Australia's diverse live industry, celebrating the success of the Australian live scene. The awards commenced in 2016.

Year	Nominee / work	Award	Result	Ref.
2019	herself	Live Voice of the Year	Nominated	
2019	herself	Queensland Live Voice of the Year	Won	
2023	Thelma Plum	Best Pop Act	Won	

=== Queensland Music Awards ===
The Queensland Music Awards (previously known as Q Song Awards) are annual awards celebrating Queensland, Australia's brightest emerging artists and established legends. They commenced in 2006.

Year	Nominee / work	Award	Result (wins only)	Ref.
2013	"Rosie"	Indigenous Song of the Year	Won	
2020	Better in Blak	Album of the Year	Won	
2023	"Backseat of My Mind"	Pop Award	Won	
2023	"Backseat of My Mind"	Song of the Year	Won	

=== Rolling Stone Australia Awards ===
The Rolling Stone Australia Awards are awarded annually in January or February by the Australian edition of Rolling Stone magazine for outstanding contributions to popular culture in the previous year.

Year	Nominee / work	Award	Result	Ref.
2023	Meanjin	Best Record	Nominated	
2025	"Freckles"	Best Single	Won	
2025	Thelma Plum	Rolling Stone Readers Award	Shortlisted	

=== Vanda & Young Global Songwriting Competition ===
The Vanda & Young Global Songwriting Competition is an annual competition that "acknowledges great songwriting whilst supporting and raising money for Nordoff-Robbins" and is coordinated by Albert Music and APRA AMCOS. It commenced in 2009.

Year	Nominee / work	Award	Result	Ref.
2013	"Breathe in Breathe Out"	Vanda & Young Global Songwriting Competition	3rd	
2020	"Better in Blak"	Vanda & Young Global Songwriting Competition	1st	
