= Antony and Cleopatra (musical duo) =

UK musical group

Antony & Cleopatra
- Genres: Techno; house; dance; pop; deep house; indie
- Years active: 2014-present
- Labels: Anjunadeep; Sweat It Out; Hexagon; Island Records; Dew Process/Universal Music Australia
- Formerly of: Motez; Riton; Kah-lo; Lancelot; Jaded; Black Caviar; Jax Jones; Tieks; Nicky Night Time; Moonboots; James Hype; Dreamtrak
- Spinoff of: Sparkadia; CocknBull Kid; Kommunion
- Members: Alexander Burnett Anita Blay
- Website: antonyandcleo.com

Antony & Cleopatra is a London-based musical duo consisting of Alexander Burnett and Anita Blay, also known as CocknBullKid. The two met in 2014 at a pop music writing session before coming together to form a musical duo.

== Formation ==
Producer and collaborator Mark-Anthony Tieku (AKA "Tieks") introduced Burnett and Blay during a pop songwriting session in 2014. Tieks had worked with both Burnett on Sparkadia's album The Great Impression and with Blay on an unreleased CocknBullKid album.

Burnett and Blay joined forces to form the Antony & Cleopatra duo. Their first official project as a duo was a feature on Lancelot's 'Givin' it Up', released on Anjuna Deep in 2014.

== Releases ==
=== Early releases ===
The duo's debut single as lead artists, "Sirens", was released March 3, 2015 on Vitalic Noise. The official music video was co-directed by Burnett and Blay with Andrew Bird.

On social media, the duo said of the track and the minimalist video: "The bigger the city, the lonelier you'll feel within it... You can't escape the sounds of sirens in London and the constant reminder of how lucky we are not to be the sirens' endpoint... In this modern era of frenetic videos, we wanted to make a video that moves you through simple emotion rather than explosions and dudes backflipping."

Later in 2015 they released the single 'Take Me'. They spoke to The 405 about the track, noting that it: 'draws heavily on the traditions of UK dance music, and this track is at its heart a shout out to all of their favourite elements. Diva vocals, breakbeats and dark textures combine...'

The official video features a montage of notable couples through history. It was directed by Australian digital artist 'Ego' and premiered on 'Ear Milk' on June 2, 2015.

'Love Is A Lonely Dancer' was released as a single on March 11, 2016. It was picked up as one of Wonderland Magazine's tracks of the week. The video was directed by Alan Masferrer, with choreography by Anna Hierro and VFX by Nico Zarza.

=== Signing and subsequent singles ===
In 2017 Antony & Cleopatra signed with Dew Process / Universal Music Australia.

Their July 2017 single 'Dust' was added to high rotation on Australian national radio station Triple J. The video was again directed by digital artist 'Ego' and was The Au Review's "Music Video of the Day" on July 12, 2017.

Subsequent singles in 2017 & 2018 were 'Twitch', 'The Islands', and 'Hurt Like Hell'. 'The Islands' featured Blay's first rap vocals. All tracks were playlisted at Triple J, with 'The Islands' receiving A-list rotation.

On May 1, 2019 they announced a new single 'Why Don't You Just Call Me' online. The track premiered on UK pop music blog Pop Justice.

=== Debut EP Hurt Like Hell ===
November 23, 2018 saw the release of their 6-song debut EP, Hurt Like Hell. Blay described the EP as "the best way of showing our more techno and weird musical moments that you'd see in our live show or DJ set.". The EP was named The AU Review's "Album of the Week".

== Discography ==
Song	Artist	Year	Record	Label
"Why Don't You Just Call Me"	Antony & Cleopatra	2019	Single	Dew Process
"Slippin'"	Jaded x Black Caviar x Antony & Cleopatra	2019	Single	Hexagon (US), The Label (UK)
"Hard Feelings"	Antony & Cleopatra	2019	Single	Dew Process / Island Records UK
"Hurt Like Hell"	Antony & Cleopatra	2018	EP	Dew Process / Island Records UK
"Hurt Like Hell"	Antony & Cleopatra	2018	Single	Dew Process / Island Records UK
"Baptised"	Antony & Cleopatra	2018	EP	Dew Process / Island Records UK
"Safe Word"	Antony & Cleopatra	2018	EP	Dew Process / Island Records UK
"Worlds Apart"	Antony & Cleopatra	2018	EP	Dew Process / Island Records UK
"Dropping Plates"	Antony & Cleopatra	2018	EP	Dew Process / Island Records UK
"The Islands"	Antony & Cleopatra	2018	Single	Dew Process / Island Records UK
"Twitch"	Antony & Cleopatra	2017	Single	Dew Process / Island Records UK
"Dust"	Antony & Cleopatra	2017	Single	Dew Process / Island Records UK
"Love is a Lonely Dancer"	Antony & Cleopatra	2016	Single	Dew Process / Island Records UK
"Take Me"	Antony & Cleopatra	2015	Single	Vitalic Noise
"Sirens"	Antony & Cleopatra	2015	Single	Vitalic Noise

== Additional songwriting and vocals ==
After Antony & Cleopatra's initial singles, the duo began to contribute to other artist and producer projects. The duo shortly featured on tracks by Lancelot, Beni, Nicky Night Time, and Sammy Bananas.

In 2015, Burnett co-wrote and performed on 'The Tide' with London producer Dreamtrak. He said of the collaboration to Wonderland Magazine: "Alexander and I have been working together for quite a long time, he’s probably the person I see the most these days! He has an amazing way with melody and words and the most incredible voice. Recently I’ve been doing production work for his forthcoming records and also co-writing for other artists with him. There’s a few things that are already out in the world – like this Antony & Cleopatra track which I’m very proud of."

In 2017, Burnett co-wrote dance producer Motez's single 'The Future ft Antony & Cleopatra'. The track featured vocals from both Burnett and Blay. As of March 2019, the track has gold status and has been streamed over 13 million times on Spotify.

Feb 18 2019 saw the release of "Slippin'" - a collaborative track between Antony & Cleopatra, New York duo Black Caviar, & production trio JADED, on Don Diablo’s ‘Hexagon’ label. The track was featured in Stella McCartney's Fall Winter 2019 Paris fashion show.

The duo have also provided songwriting and vocals on the below:

Song	Artist	Year	Record	Label
"Slippin'"	Jaded x Black Caviar x Antony & Cleopatra	2019	Single	Hexagon (US), The Label (UK)
"Careful Baby"	Nicky Night Time feat. Antony & Cleopatra	2016	Single	Sweat It Out
"Never Get to You"	Moonboots feat. Antony & Cleopatra	2016	Single	Anjunabeats
"Money Time"	Sammy Bananas feat. Antony & Cleopatra	2015	Single	Fools Gold
"The Tide"	Dreamtrak	2015	Single	Mermaid Avenue / Mom + Pop
"Givin' it Up"	Lanceleot feat. Antony & Cleopatra	2014	Single	Anjunadeep
"Protect"	Beni feat. Antony & Cleopatra	2014	Single	WIN/Modular
"Make Ends Meet"	Lancelot feat. Antony & Cleopatra	2014	Single	Anjunadeep

== Live performances ==
The duo's first Australian tour was part of the 2017 Alison Wonderland's 'Scarehouse Project' alongside other acts such as Lunice, Lido, ASAP Ferg and Saatchi.

In July 2018, they went on to play at Australia's largest winter music festival, Splendour in the Grass.

Antony & Cleopatra additionally toured with Riton and Kahlo, performing at Oxford Art Factory in Sydney and the Prince Bandroom in Melbourne.
