= Motez (musician) =

Australian record producer, musician and DJ

- Born: Moutaiz Al-Obaidi
- Origin: Baghdad
- Genres: House; Techno; Ambient
- Occupations: DJ; Record Producer; Composer; Installation Artist
- Years active: 2010–present
- Labels: Sweat It Out; Food Music; Ultra; Sony; Universal; Owsla; Armada; This Never Happened; Club Madhouse
- Website: www.motez.com.au

Moutaiz Al-Obaidi, known professionally as Motez, is an Australian record producer, musician, installation artist and DJ. Motez was a refugee born in Iraq and moved to Adelaide in 2006. Motez's Song "The Future" featuring Antony and Cleopatra was certified Platinum in Australia. He has won several South Australian Music Awards for Best Solo Artist (2021) and Most Popular Electronic Artist (2016, 2018, 2020 and 2021)

== Touring ==
Motez has performed at many festivals including: Splendour in the Grass, Falls Festival, Warehouse Project and Electric Forest Festival. He embarked on his own headline tour in 2017 with Tigerilla and Mickey Kojak as supports.

== Soulitude ==
In the wake of lockdown restrictions and the cancelation of live events due to the Coronavirus pandemic, Motez released an introspective, ambient EP called Soulitude which was conceived as a "response to the global mindset of isolation". The project was touted as a "raw, minimal and emotive ambient work, encompassing his own experiences and the natural human responses to seclusion." To commemorate the release of Soulitude, Motez played and recorded a live set of the entire EP in Fleurieu Peninsula, South Australia which was streamed online through United We Stream, the event was a set up to raise funds for Support Act. and garnered over 25,000 plays in the first day and won Best Video and Best Release at the 2020 SA Music Awards.

== Coalesce ==
In 2023, Motez released the EP 'Coalesce', dubbed as a collaborative audio-visual project with multi-disciplinary Australian artist Dave Court and features the likes of Elsy Wameyo and DOOLIE. Inspired by the imagery of a crumbling city, Motez envisioned a surreal landscape for the EP's seven tracks. The visual companion set in an imaginary realm called the "hypercube," where the essence of "Coalesce" converges. Blurring the lines between the physical and virtual realms, the aim was to dissolve boundaries and merge tangible elements with digital art, infusing warmth into traditionally industrial sounds. Drawing inspiration from Marshall McLuhan's "The Medium is the Massage," the project emphasizes the significance of the creative process in art and music, reflecting on societal and philosophical implications amidst technological advancements.

The video for Coalesce's lead single 'Make Way' featuring Elsy Waymeyo, directed by Court, was included in RAGE's top 50 videos of 2023.

== Live Show ==
Motez debuted his live show at Womad Festival on March 12, 2022. The show featured live instrumentation by string and brass sections, kids' choir as well as guest vocalists including George Alice. The show was subsequently broadcast on Triple J as part of their 'Live at the Wireless' series which aired in May 2022. The show was dubbed as "a spectacular combination of powerful dance beats with a stunning light show" by The AU Review. In an interview with Roland, Motez said "I first attended Womadelaide soon after moving to Australia and I dreamt of playing there one day. I understood that the stakes were high, the calibre of musicianship and showmanship was incredible, so I thought if I ever put on a show there it must be more than just about music. It has to be an audio-visual experience matched with a lot of live instrumentation. I am a musician first and foremost, and so presenting my live show for the first time at Womadelaide I had go all out."

== Installation Music & Other Ventures ==
In 2022, Motez along with long-time collaborators Mapped Design formed "Harsh Realities": an installation and art collective described as "a creative studio specialising in immersive audio-visual experiences that evoke thought, deconstruct ideas, and reveal beneath the surface.". Notable projects include ORBIT, showcased during Illuminate Adelaide, BREATHE, featured at Uni SA's Museum of Discovery, and PASSAGE, presented as part of Adelaide Fringe's 'Natural Wonders' series within the Adelaide Botanic Garden.

Motez also composed the score to the short film "Which Made This Place Home" (written and directed by Maddie Gramatopoulos.) as well as the experimental, dance short film "Strega" (directed by Tiah Trimboli) which launched as part of Adelaide Film Festival.

== Discography ==
=== Singles ===
- Raves Are Dead (2010)
- A Trick Or Two / Makes Me Itch (2010)
- Hard Times (2011)
- Ride Roof Back / Take Off (2013)
- Promise Me / Bodyrock (2014)
- Own Up (2014)
- Down Like This feat. Tkay Maidza (2016)
- Praise / Fire Burning (2017)
- The Future feat. Antony & Cleopatra (2017)
- Roll Out (2018)
- Steady Motion feat. KWAYE (2019)
- Toggle (2019)
- Where Have You Been (2019)
- Patience (2020)
- Slow Down (2020)
- Give Your Heart Away (2020)
- Andes (2021)
- Give Me Space feat. The Kite String Tangle (2021)
- ReSet (2021)
- Submission (2022)
- Get it Done feat. Scrufizzer (2022)
- Be Prepared
- Make Way (feat. Elsy Wameyo)
- Work Me (feat. DOOLIE)
- Good 2 Go
- Lemonade (feat. TANISHA)
- Light in the Sky (feat. Lauren Ray)

=== EPs ===
- Call My Name EP (2013)
- No Need To Panic (2014)
- Vancouver (2015)
- The Vibe EP (2016)
- Late Thoughts EP (2018)
- Soulitude (2020)
- ReSet (2021)
- Coalesce (2023)

=== Remixes ===
- Anna Lunoe - DBS (Motez Remix)
- Golden Features feat. Rromarin - Touch (Motez Remix)
- Ninajirachi - Start Small (Motez Remix)
- Flume feat. Caroline Polachek - Sirens (Motez Remix)
- Client Liaison - Elevator Up (Motez Remix)
- Icarus (band) – Sirens (Motez Remix)
- Northeast Party House - Shelf Life (Motez Remix)
- Tensnake - Rules (Motez Remix)
- The Kite String Tangle - North (Motez Remix)
- Karma Fields - Colorblind ft. Tove Lo (Motez Remix)
- Peking Duk – Wasted (Motez Remix)
- Allen French – Nova Vida (Motez Remix)
- Flight Facilities – Sunshine feat. Reggie Watts (Motez Remix)
- Sam Smith – Leave Your Lover (Motez Remix)
- Disclosure – Omen (Motez Remix) [feat. Sam Smith]
- Panama – Jungle (Motez Remix)
- Flight Facilities – Clair de Lune (Motez Remix)
- Owl Eyes – Open Up (Motez Remix)
- Tyler Touché – Heart in Motion (Motez Remix)
- Madison Avenue – Don't Call Me Baby (Motez Remix)
- Gary Richards – "All Nite" ft. E-40 & Too $hort (Motez Remix)
- Rufus Du Sol – Desert Night (Motez Remix)
- Ellie Goulding – Beating Heart (Motez Remix)

=== Film Score ===
- Which Made This Place Home - Short Film (Directed, Produced and Written by Maddie Gramatopoulos)
- Strega - Short Film (Directed by Tiah Trimboli)

== Awards ==
=== South Australian Music Awards ===
The South Australian Music Awards (previously known as the Fowler's Live Music Awards) are annual awards in the South Australian contemporary music industry. They commenced in 2012.

Year	Nominee / work	Award	Result (wins only)
2016	Motez	Best Producer	Won
2017	Motez	Most Popular Electronic Artist	Won
2018	Motez	Most Popular Electronic Artist	Won
2020	"Soulitude" by Motez	Best Release	Won
2020	"Soulitude" by Motez	Best Music Video	Won
2020	Motez	People's Choice Electronic Artist	Won
2021	Motez	Best Solo	Won
2021	Motez	Best Electronic	Won
