= Meanjin (EP) =

EP by Thelma Plum
- Released: 12 August 2022
- Label: Warner Music Australia
- Producers: Alexander Burnett; Oli Horton

Thelma Plum chronology
Better in Blak (2019)	Meanjin (2022)	I'm Sorry, Now Say It Back (2024)

Singles from Meanjin
- 1. "Backseat of My Mind" Released: 27 May 2022; 2. "When It Rains It Pours" Released: 13 July 2022; 3. "The Brown Snake" Released: 12 August 2022

Meanjin is the third extended play by Australian singer-songwriter Thelma Plum, released on 12 August 2022 through Warner Music Australia. Plum has described the EP as a "love letter" to Brisbane, with Meanjin being the indigenous name for the city.

The EP's six songs were written after COVID forced Plum to leave London for Brisbane while in the middle of writing and recording her second full-length album. Returning to Brisbane, saying, "In strange times you always tend to look back at warm memories for comfort, and when I was confined to an apartment overlooking 'The Brown Snake', I found myself writing music about Meanjin, the place I grew up in and have gravitated back to." Sonically, the EP is inspired by artists Plum was listening to throughout lockdown, including Phoebe Bridgers, as well as those she had loved for years like Shania Twain and Fleetwood Mac.

The EP will be supported by an Australian tour, with special guests Graace and Jem Cassar-Daley.

At the 2022 ARIA Music Awards, the EP earned the Plum a nomination for Best Solo Artist. The EP was nominated for Best Pop Release.

At the National Indigenous Music Awards 2023, the EP won Album of the Year.

== Critical reception ==
Josh Leeson said "The '80s-inspired 'When It Rains It Pours' and 'Backseat of My Mind' are driven by gorgeous melodies and the off-kilter piano ballad 'Baby Blue Bicycle' showcases Plum's stunning vocal, as she tells the story of her childhood neighbour. At six tracks, Meanjin is short and ever so sweet. Most importantly it leaves you wanting more from Plum."

NME gave the EP a positive review, with Ellie Robinson writing: "Thelma Plum’s six-track ode to the city that shaped her is a compelling listen from start to finish, as the singer-songwriter weaves a rich and riveting tapestry of Meanjin – also known as Brisbane – with considered nods to her most formative experiences, the characters that drove them, and the local flora and fauna that coloured them."

== Track listing ==
All tracks are written by Thelma Plum, Alexander Burnett and Oli Horton.

Meanjin track listing
No.	Title	Producer(s)	Length
1.	"The Brown Snake"	Burnett; Horton	3:15
2.	"When It Rains it Pours"	Burnett; Horton	4:13
3.	"Backseat of My Mind"	Burnett; Horton	4:24
4.	"Baby Blue Bicycle"	Burnett; Horton	3:07
5.	"Bars on My Windows"	Burnett; Horton	2:11
6.	"The Bat Song"	Burnett; Horton	2:41

Meanjin (Deluxe) track listing
No.	Title	Producer(s)	Length
7.	"The Brown Snake" (live at 56)	Burnett; Horton
8.	"When It Rains it Pours" (live at 56)	Burnett; Horton
9.	"Backseat of My Mind" (live at 56)	Burnett; Horton
10.	"Baby Blue Bicycle" (live at 56)	Burnett; Horton
11.	"Bars on My Windows" (live at 56)	Burnett; Horton
12.	"The Bat Song" (live at 56)	Burnett; Horton

== Charts ==
Chart performance for Meanjin
Chart (2022)	Peak position
Australian Albums (ARIA)	28

== Release history ==
Release history and formats for Meanjin
Region	Date	Format	Edition	Label	Catalogue	Ref
Various	12 August 2022	CD; digital download; streaming	Standard	Warner Music Australia	5419724168	
Australia	25 November 2022	LP	Vinyl Edition	Warner Music Australia	5419723033	
Various	25 November 2022	digital download; streaming	Deluxe Edition	Warner Music Australia	—N/a	
