= Better in Blak =

Studio album by Thelma Plum
- Released: 12 July 2019
- Length: 36:58
- Label: Warner Music Australia
- Producers: Alexander Burnett; David Kahne

Thelma Plum chronology
Monsters (2014)	Better in Blak (2019)	Meanjin (2022)

Singles from Better in Blak
- 1. "Clumsy Love" Released: 13 July 2018; 2. "Not Angry Anymore" Released: 1 February 2019; 3. "Better in Blak" Released: 26 April 2019; 4. "Homecoming Queen" Released: 12 July 2019

Better in Blak is the debut studio album by Australian singer-songwriter Thelma Plum, released on 12 July 2019 through Warner Music Australia.

Better in Blak achieved commercial success, peaking at number 4 on the ARIA Albums Chart, and winning two awards: Best Cover Art at the 2019 ARIA Music Awards and Album of the Year at the 2020 Queensland Music Awards.

An anniversary edition featuring previously unreleased tracks was released on 6 November 2020.

== Critical reception ==
Professional ratings
Review scores
Source	Rating
The Newcastle Herald	4/5 stars

Better in Blak received critical acclaim.

Josh Leeson of The Newcastle Herald wrote: "Emotional, and unapologetically honest, the Indigenous artist addresses racism, sexism and her broken heart", adding, "Plum's voice is placed at the forefront of the mix, allowing the sparse indie-folk instrumentation to provide casual direction."

Al Newstead from Triple J wrote that Better in Blak is "an album of healing, [and] transforming the pain and sadness of a dark few years into a courageous, self-assured debut album."

Thomas Bleach described the album as "a collection of hard-hitting and thought invoking [sic] moments", and "one of the most impressive debuts of the year". He also wrote that Better in Blak "embodies the different sides of her artistry in an honest and endearing way."

== Track listing ==
Better in Blak track listing
No.	Title	Writer(s)	Length
1.	"Clumsy Love"	Thelma Plum	3:07
2.	"Don't Let a Good Girl Down"	Plum; Alexander Burnett; Oli Horton	2:54
3.	"Love and War" (featuring David Le'aupepe)	Plum; Ross James; Le'aupepe	3:28
4.	"Not Angry Anymore"	Plum; Burnett; Horton	3:23
5.	"Homecoming Queen"	Plum; Burnett; Horton	3:51
6.	"Better in Blak"	Plum; Burnett; Horton	3:12
7.	"Woke Blokes"	Plum; Burnett; Horton	2:34
8.	"Nick Cave"	Plum; Burnett	2:45
9.	"Thulumaay Gii"	Plum; Burnett; Horton	2:50
10.	"Ugly"	Plum; Burnett; Horton	3:07
11.	"Do You Ever Get So Sad You Can't Breathe"	Plum	2:17
12.	"Made for You"	Plum; David Kahne; Paul Kelly; Paul McCartney	3:30
Total length:			36:58

Better in Blak anniversary edition track listing
No.	Title	Length
13.	"Body Do the Talking"	2:26
14.	"Clumsy Love" (St South remix)	2:48
15.	"Better in Blak" (Antony & Cleopatra remix)	3:48
16.	"Homecoming Queen" (Alice Ivy remix)	4:28
17.	"Clumsy Love" (Acoustic version)	3:06
18.	"Better in Blak" (piano version)	2:44
Total length:		56:18

== Charts ==
=== Weekly charts ===
Weekly chart performance for Better in Blak
Chart (2019)	Peak position
Australian Albums (ARIA)	4

=== Year-end charts ===
2019 year-end chart performance for Better in Blak
Chart (2019)	Position
Australian Artist Albums (ARIA)	46

2020 year-end chart performance for Better in Blak
Chart (2020)	Position
Australian Albums (ARIA)	87

== Certifications ==
Certifications and sales for Better in Blak
Region	Certification	Certified units/sales
Australia (ARIA)	Gold	35,000^{‡}
^{‡} Sales+streaming figures based on certification alone.

== Release history ==
Release history and formats for Better in Blak
Region	Date	Format	Edition	Label	Catalogue	Ref
Various	12 July 2019	CD; LP; digital download; streaming	Standard	Warner Music Australia	5419704880	
Various	6 November 2020	Digital download; streaming	Anniversary Edition	Warner Music Australia	Not applicable	
Australia	12 November 2020	LP	Anniversary Edition	Warner Music Australia	5419708255	

== Awards and nominations ==
=== ARIA Music Awards ===
Year	Nominee / work	Award	Result	Ref.
2019	Better in Blak	Album of the Year	Nominated	
2019	Better in Blak	Best Cover Art (Note: Plum was nominated for Best Cover Art for Emilie Pfitzner's artwork design.)	Won	
2019	Better in Blak	Best Female Artist	Nominated	
2019	Better in Blak	Best Pop Release	Nominated	
2019	Better in Blak	Breakthrough Artist	Nominated	

=== Australian Music Prize ===
Year	Nominee / work	Award	Result	Ref.
2019	Better in Blak	Album of the Year	Nominated	

=== J Awards ===
Year	Nominee / work	Award	Result	Ref.
2019	Better in Blak	Australian Album of the Year	Nominated	

=== National Indigenous Music Awards ===
Year	Nominee / work	Award	Result	Ref.
2019	Better in Blak	Album of the Year	Nominated	

=== Queensland Music Awards ===
Year	Nominee / work	Award	Result	Ref.
2020	Better in Blak	Album of the Year	Won	
