= George Alice =

Australian pop musician

- Born: Georgia Mannion; 25 March 2003 (age 23)
- Origin: Adelaide, South Australia, Australia
- Genres: Pop; electronic; electropop; indie pop; indie folk
- Occupations: Singer; songwriter
- Instruments: Vocals; guitar; piano
- Years active: 2019–present
- Website: georgealice.com

Georgia Mannion (born 25 March 2003), known professionally as George Alice, is an Australian singer-songwriter.

In 2019, Mannion released her debut single "Circles", for which she won Triple J's Unearthed High competition.

== Early life and education ==
Georgia Mannion was born on 25 March 2003. She began busking at 11 years old.

Mannion attended Faith Lutheran College, in Tanunda, South Australia.

== Musical style and influences ==
Mannion is primarily a pop, electronic, electropop, indie pop, and indie folk artist.

Alice's music has been likened to Maggie Rogers.

== Career ==
=== 2019: "Circles" and Unearthed High win ===
Mannion rose to prominence with her debut single "Circles", which was released in July 2019, and led her to win Triple J's 2019 Unearthed High competition. "Circles" ranked at number 64 in Triple J's Hottest 100 of 2019.

She released a music video for "Circles" through a partnership with Ditto Music, and subsequently signed regional deals with Paradigm Talent Agency.

=== 2020-present: "Stuck in a Bubble" and "Teenager" ===
On 18 March 2020, Mannion released an acoustic version of "Circles". On 10 June, Alice released the single "Stuck in a Bubble", featuring producer Nasaya.

On 23 November 2020, Mannion released the single "Teenager". "Teenager" was co-written by Vetta Borne and produced by Japanese Wallpaper, and was premiered on Triple J's Breakfast with Bryce Mills.

In October 2021, Mannion released "Mid Years". The track was co-written with Alex Lahey and Gab Strum (aka Japanese Wallpaper), with the latter also spearheading production.

On 18 February 2022 Mannion released her debut EP, Growing Pains.

On 23 June 2023, Mannion released "Healed". Triple J said "Lyrically, 'Healed' explores the elevated, almost euphoric, feelings that flourish when you've pushed through the grief of a heartbreak."

== Discography ==
=== Extended plays ===
List of EPs, with release date and label shown
Title	Details
Growing Pains	Released: 18 February 2022; Label: Loma Vista; Formats: digital download, streaming

=== Singles ===
==== As lead artist ====
List of singles, with year released, selected chart positions, and album name shown
Title	Year	Peak chart positions		Certifications	Album
Title	Year	AUS	NZ Hot	Certifications	Album
"Circles"	2019	—	—	ARIA: Gold	Growing Pains
"Stuck in a Bubble" (with Nasaya)	2020	—	34		Growing Pains
"Teenager"	2020	—	—		Growing Pains
"Mid Years"	2021	—	—		Growing Pains
"Hold On"	2022	—	—		Growing Pains
"Haunted"	2022	—	—		Growing Pains
"Healed"	2023	—	—		TBA
"SOS"	2025	—	—		TBA
"Valium & Sushi"	2025	—	—		TBA
"He Sucks"	2025	—	—		TBA
"Stupid Question" / "Tightrope"	2026	—	—		TBA
"Another Stupid Question"	2026	—	—		TBA

==== As featured artist ====
List of singles, with year released and album name shown
Title	Year	Album
"Do It All Again" (East Av3 featuring George Alice)	2021	Non-album single

== Awards and nominations ==
George Alice was awarded a Robert Stigwood Fellowship, which provided mentorship and professional development, by the Music Development Office in SA.

=== J Awards ===
The J Awards are an annual series of Australian music awards that were established by the Australian Broadcasting Corporation's youth-focused radio station Triple J. They commenced in 2005.

In 2019, Mannion received a nomination for the Unearthed Artist of the Year Award.

Year	Nominee / work	Award	Result	Ref.
2019	Herself	Unearthed Artist of the Year	Nominated	
