= The Last Goodbye (Odesza album) =

Studio album by Odesza
- Released: July 22, 2022
- Length: 50:32
- Labels: Ninja Tune; Foreign Family Collective
- Producers: Harrison Mills; Clayton Knight; James Patterson; Ben Ruttner; Ólafur Arnalds

Odesza chronology
Bronson (2020)	The Last Goodbye (2022)	Flaws in Our Design (2023)

Odesza albums chronology
A Moment Apart (2017)	The Last Goodbye (2022)

Singles from The Last Goodbye
- 1. "The Last Goodbye" Released: February 8, 2022; 2. "Better Now" Released: March 2, 2022; 3. "Love Letter" Released: March 23, 2022; 4. "Behind the Sun" Released: April 26, 2022; 5. "Wide Awake" Released: June 8, 2022; 6. "Light of Day" Released: July 13, 2022

The Last Goodbye is the fourth studio album by the American electronic music duo Odesza, released on July 22, 2022 through Ninja Tune and Foreign Family Collective. It is the duo's first studio album in five years, after A Moment Apart.

The duo teased new music at the beginning of 2022 through social media. The first single, "The Last Goodbye (feat. Bettye LaVette)", was released as the lead single in February 2022. The second single, "Better Now", was released in March. Following the album's announcement later that month, "Love Letter" was released as the third single. "Behind The Sun" was released as the fourth single in April. "Wide Awake" was released as the fifth single in June. "Light Of Day" was released as the final single in July. The album features contributions from Julianna Barwick, Charlie Houston, Izzy Bizu, Maro, Bettye LaVette, Låpsley, and Ólafur Arnalds.

The album received positive reviews from critics, with praise towards its production values and emotional tone. The album was nominated for Best Dance/Electronic Album for the 65th Grammy Awards.

== Background ==
Along with the album's announcement in March 2022, the duo released a statement behind the creation of the album: "Over the past few years we’ve been able to reflect on who we are, what it means to do what we do, and in the end, who we are doing this for. We became focused and inspired by the impact our families and friends have imprinted on us and how we want to continue to echo that out as we move through this life. We found comfort in the fact that those who we love stay with us, that they become intrinsically part of us, in a way."

== Promotion ==
=== Multimedia ===
The duo teased new music in January 2022 through social media. In February 2022, the duo launched a campaign titled "Welcome to The Last Goodbye." It consisted of unreleased audio snippets and video footage of Mills and Knight's childhood years that were generated through fans typing a given password into the duo's microsite.

=== Singles and music videos ===
On February 8, 2022, "The Last Goodbye", featuring Bettye LaVette, was released as the lead single from the album. The music video for the single was released the following week. The second single, "Better Now", featuring Maro, was released on March 2. Its music video was later released on April 19. With the announcement of The Last Goodbye on March 23, "Love Letter", featuring The Knocks, was released as the third single from the album. A music video, starring Simone Ashley, was premiered after the album's release, on August 4. The fourth single, "Behind the Sun", was released on April 26, alongside a music video. "Wide Awake", featuring Charlie Houston, was released on June 8 as the fifth single. "Light Of Day", featuring Ólafur Arnalds, was released on July 13 as the sixth and final single.

== Reception ==
Professional ratings
Aggregate scores
Source	Rating
Metacritic	73/100
Review scores
Source	Rating
AllMusic	4/5 stars
Clash	7/10
Exclaim!	8/10
Pitchfork	5.8/10

The Last Goodbye received generally positive reviews from critics, with praise towards the album's production values and emotional tone. It has an assigned normalized rating of 73 out of 100 based on 4 critical reviews, indicating 'generally favorable reviews' from review aggregator Metacritic.

Paul Simpson of AllMusic gave the album a positive review, stating it as a "definite improvement over A Moment Apart" and describing the tracks as "bigger and more anthemic." Allie Gregory, reviewing for Exclaim!, also gave a positive review, commenting on the album's "varied components coming together to form a cohesive unit." Kieran Macdonald-Brown of Clash also praised the album's emotional and poignant tone, whilst describing the album as a "cinematic body of work that triumphs in its ability to meld a plethora of electronic styles together."

Daniel Bromfield of Pitchfork was more critical of the album, commenting that "the constant malaise keeps the[se] songs from generating the ridiculous, heart-swelling feeling of transcendence that the best big-room dance music can achieve."

== Track listing ==
The Last Goodbye track listing
No.	Title	Writer(s)	Length
1.	"This Version of You" (featuring Julianna Barwick)	Clayton Knight; Harrison Mills	2:51
2.	"Wide Awake" (featuring Charlie Houston)	Knight; Mills; Charlotte Houston; Chris Stiliadis	3:35
3.	"Love Letter" (featuring the Knocks)	Knight; Mills; James Patterson; Ben Ruttner; Kaelyn Behr; Alex Drury; Hannah Yadi	4:13
4.	"Behind the Sun"		4:10
5.	"Forgive Me" (featuring Izzy Bizu)	Knight; Mills; Isobel Bizu Beardshaw; Tancrede Rouff	3:28
6.	"North Garden"	Knight; Mills; Jimmy L. Webb	3:00
7.	"Better Now" (featuring Maro)	Knight; Mills; Mariana Brito Da Cruz Forjaz	3:14
8.	"The Last Goodbye" (featuring Bettye LaVette)	Knight; Mills; Wrecia Holloway; James McDougal	5:58
9.	"All My Life"	Knight; Mills; Axel Linstädt; Bernd Linstädt	3:12
10.	"Equal" (featuring Låpsley)	Knight; Mills; Holly Fletcher; Steph Marziano	3:53
11.	"Healing Grid"		3:06
12.	"I Can't Sleep"		3:07
13.	"Light of Day" (featuring Ólafur Arnalds)	Knight; Mills; Arnalds	6:40
Total length:			50:32

Deluxe edition (disc 2) track listing
No.	Title	Writer(s)	Length
1.	"Hopeful"		4:08
2.	"To Be Yours" (featuring Claud)	Mills; Knight; Claudia Mintz; Smokey Robinson; Warren Moore	3:31
3.	"All We Need" (featuring Shy Girls; VIP remix)	Knight; Mills; Dan Vidmar	3:30
4.	"Sun Models" (featuring Madelyn Grant; VIP remix)	Knight; Mills; Grant	3:55

Notes

- "Behind the Sun" contains samples of "Sib", performed by Simin Ghanem
- "North Garden" contains samples of "Wichita Lineman", written by Jimmy L. Webb and performed by Glen Campbell
- "The Last Goodbye" contains samples of "Let Me Down Easy", written by Wrecia Holloway and performed by Bettye LaVette
- "Light of Day" contains samples of "Mary", written and performed by Stephen Ambrose

== Personnel ==
Odesza

- Harrison Mills – production, engineering (all tracks); vocals (track 11), creative direction, cover design
- Clayton Knight – production, engineering (all tracks), string arrangement (1, 4), French horn arrangement (4)

Additional musicians

- Tracy Barrett Adams – spoken word (1)
- Julianna Barwick – vocals (1)
- Rory Andrew – string arrangement (1)
- Edgar Sandoval – strings (1)
- Charlie Houston – vocals (2)
- James Patterson – vocals (3)
- Ross Clark – guitar (3)
- Sérgio Wagner – French horn (4)
- Izzy Bizu – vocals (5)
- Mark Hunter – bass guitar (5, 8)
- Maro – vocals (7)
- Bettye LaVette – vocals (8)
- Richard Adlam – keyboards, programming (8)
- Hal Ritson – keyboards, programming (8)
- Låpsley – vocals (10)
- St. South – vocals (12)
- Paulina Drucker – vocals (12)

Technical

- Matt Colton – mastering
- Eric J Dubowsky – mixing
- James Patterson – production (3)
- Ben Ruttner – production (3)
- Ólafur Arnalds – production (13)
- Kaelyn Behr – additional production (3)
- Richard Adlam – additional production (8)
- Hal Riston – additional production (8)
- Tancrede Rouff – vocal production (5)
- Steph Marziano – vocal production (10)
- Pablo Hopenhayn – string production (4)
- Chris Stiliadis – engineering (2)
- Rory Andrew – string engineering (1)

Visuals

- Michelle Gadeken – creative direction, design, cover design, layout
- Reed Juenger – creative direction, design, cover design, layout
- Alexander Babarikin – photography

== Charts ==
=== Weekly charts ===
Weekly chart performance for The Last Goodbye
Chart (2022)	Peak position
Australian Albums (ARIA)	22
Belgian Albums (Ultratop Flanders)	118
German Albums (Offizielle Top 100)	31
Scottish Albums (Official Charts)	85
Swiss Albums (Schweizer Hitparade)	17
UK Dance Albums (Official Charts)	1
UK Album Downloads (Official Charts)	11
UK Independent Albums (Official Charts)	10
US Billboard 200	11
US Independent Albums (Billboard)	3
US Top Dance Albums (Billboard)	2

=== Year-end charts ===
2022 year-end chart performance for The Last Goodbye
Chart (2022)	Position
US Top Dance/Electronic Albums (Billboard)	23
