= Karoondinha Music & Arts Festival =

Coordinates: 40.8378°N 77.6834°W

- Genre: Hip hop, Electronica, Indie rock, Alternative rock, R&B
- Dates: July 21–23, 2017
- Location: Centre Hall, Pennsylvania
- Years active: 2017-19, 2021-
- Founders: Hawk Eye Presents
- Website: Official Website

Karoondinha Music & Arts Festival was a music festival which was to be held at Penn's Cave & Wildlife Park in Centre Hall, Pennsylvania. The festival was officially announced on December 9, 2016. The inaugural festival's full lineup was unveiled May 2, 2017, and featured Chance the Rapper, John Legend, ODESZA, Paramore, and Sturgill Simpson as headliners. On June 27, 2017 the festival's official website and social media went dark signaling the festival had been cancelled. Compounded with the festival's reported financial struggles, an overarching factor in the closing of the festival was a result of the May 22nd terrorist attack of an Ariana Grande concert in London. Many consumers feared the possibility of a similar attack taking place at the venue in Penn's Cave, forcing ticket sales to plummet, and subsequently, contributing to the cancellation of the festival.

== Musical acts ==
=== 2017 ===
On May 2, 2017, the official lineup announcement was made for the inaugural year of the festival, which will be held July 21–23, 2017. The festival will be headlined by Chance the Rapper, John Legend, ODESZA, Paramore, and Sturgill Simpson. The Roots, Porter Robinson, Dillon Francis and Young the Giant are also among the many artists performing at the three day festival.

Below is the lineup listed in the order as they appear on the official lineup poster, as of May 11, 2017:

- Chance the Rapper
- John Legend
- ODESZA
- Paramore
- Sturgill Simpson
- The Roots
- Porter Robinson
- Dillon Francis
- Young the Giant
- Chromeo
- Alessia Cara
- Leon Bridges
- X Ambassadors
- The Revivalists
- Daya
- Maren Morris
- NEEDTOBREATHE
- Misterwives
- Jon Bellion
- Alunageorge
- Marian Hill
- Broods
- DNCE
- St. Lucia
- COIN
- PVRIS
- Grace VanderWaal
- Jacob Collier
- Us the Duo
- Watsky
- The Griswolds
- Drake White and the Big Fire
- Cam
- MAX
- Colony House
- Mavis Staples
- Caveman
- Jordan Fisher
- Morgan James
- DREAMERS
- Ripe
- Lawrence
- Busty and the Bass
- Wild Child
- City of the Sun
- Andy Allo
- Spencer Ludwig
- Shy Girls
- Mikaela Davis
- Chukwudi Hodge
- Alaman
- Lenina Crowne
