= Comanche Sound =

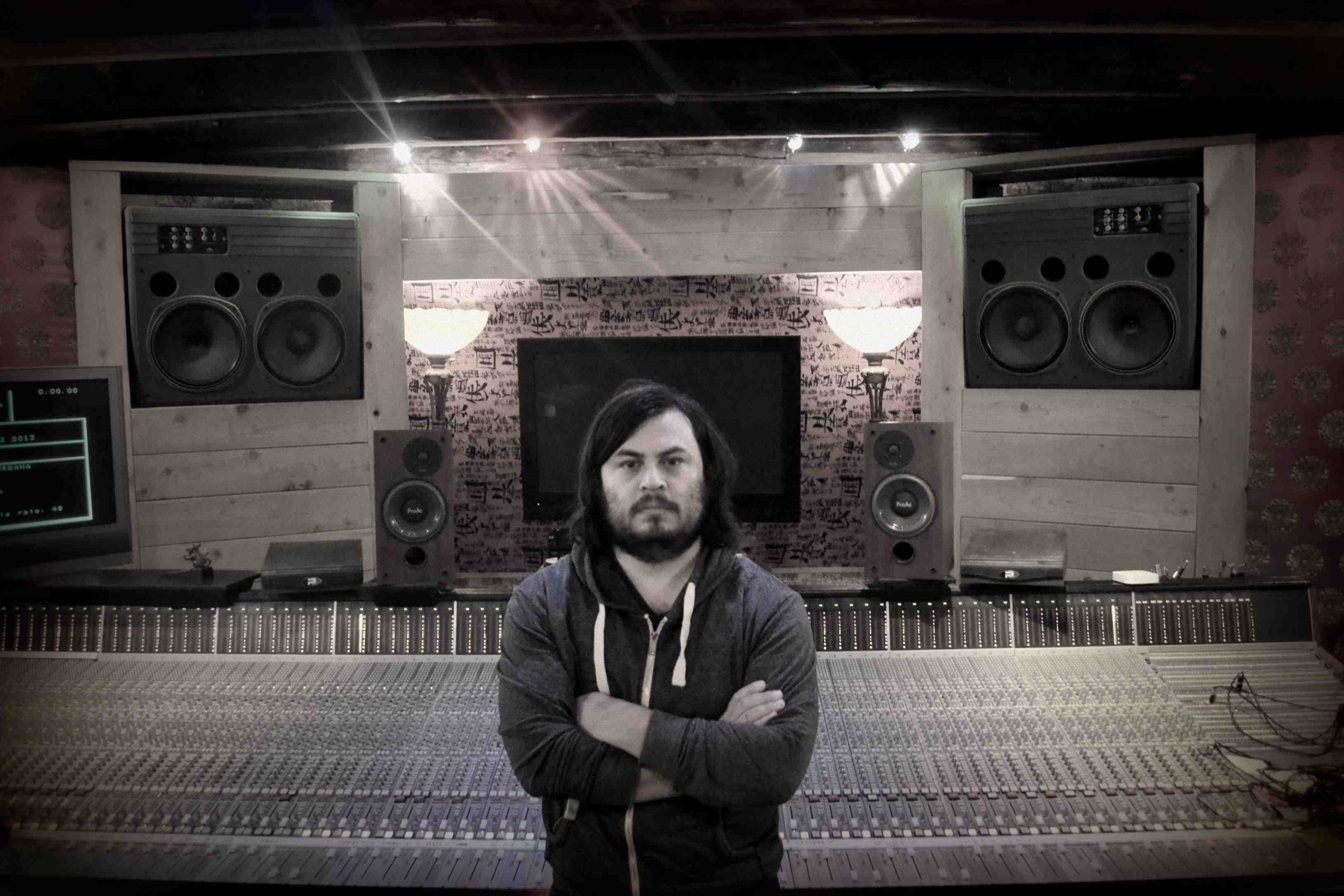
- Calderon at Sonic Ranch Recording Studios

Background information
- Born: El Paso, Texas
- Occupations: Producer; Mixer; Recording Engineer
- Member of: The Chamanas
- Website: comanchesound.com

Manuel Calderon, also known as Comanche Sound, is a Mexican-American Grammy nominated producer, Recording and Mixing Engineer from the border cities of El Paso, Texas and Ciudad Juarez, Chihuahua.

Manuel Calderon began playing guitar and bass at age 13. Being exposed to several music genres throughout his life, he developed flexibility and spontaneity that allowed him to discover a unique way to create and present his music in different genres such as: pop, dream pop, rock, indie, ska, Latin and Mexican traditional music.

Calderon initiated his music production studies in 2004 and attended Full Sail University in Orlando, Florida. Right upon graduation in 2005, he started an internship at a well-known recording studio called Westlake in Los Angeles, California, where he later became a formal engineer. He started his early recording practices here and had the chance to assist artists such as Herbie Hancock, Josh Groban, Annie Lennox, Michael Bolton, and producers like Humberto Gatica, Glenn Ballard and Quincy Jones, to mention a few.

Calderon decided to move back to the border of el Paso, Texas in 2009 to work as an engineer at Sonic Ranch. One of the largest Residential Recording Studio complex, located just 20 miles away from El Paso. Some of the artists he worked with include: Enrique Bunbury, Zoe, Motel, Animal Collective, Portugal. The Man, David Garza, Nina Diaz (Girl in a Coma), Yeah Yeah Yeahs and Gogol Bordello.

Calderon gained much experience from very important producers and engineers. He then decided to do his own music production company called "Comanche Sound". In this company he had the chance to produce/engineer albums from artists and bands like Hello Seahorse!, Ximena Sariñana, Enjambre, Beach House, etc.

In 2011, Manuel met Hector Carreon while working at Sonic Ranch, later forming a band called "The Chamanas" in 2013. Both engineers decided to join forces and combine their music production skills and knowledge into their own music. The Chamanas were nominated for a Latin Grammy in 2016 as "Best New Artist" almost a year after the release of their debut album "Once Once". The album was produced and engineered by Manuel Calderon and mainly written by Hector Carreon.

Calderon currently plays bass for The Chamanas and has toured nationally and internationally collaborating with artists and bands such as Fernando Milagros, Portugal. The Man, Odesza, Los Angeles Negros, producer Dave Sitek (TV on the Radio) and opened shows for Beach House, Enjambre and George Clinton

He has also performed at important venues across the country and international festivals such as Vive Latino, LAMC, Almax, SXSW, Neon Desert, among other.
