= Sect (album) =

Studio album by Golden Features
- Released: 27 July 2018
- Genre: Indie electronic; house; dance
- Length: 42:00
- Label: Warner Music; Parlophone
- Producer: Golden Features

Golden Features chronology
XXIV (2015)	Sect (2018)	Bronson (2020)

Singles from Sect
- 1. "Falling Out" Released: 22 March 2018; 2. "Worship" Released: 12 June 2018; 3. "Always" Released: 13 July 2018; 4. "Woodcut" Released: 14 December 2018

Sect (stylised in all caps) is the debut studio album by Australian electronic producer Golden Features, released on 27 July 2018 via Warner Music Australia. The album was supported by a headline national tour across Australia commencing on Saturday 11 August 2018 until Saturday 26 August 2018. The tour was announced on 4 April 2018 alongside the album, following the release of lead single "Falling Out" on 22 March 2018.

Sect peaked at number 11 on the ARIA Charts.

== Background ==
During the process of creating Sect, Stell favoured the feel of hardware for the album, stating, "I abandoned a lot of software in favour of hardware as an attempt to limit sound design possibilities, and more importantly I settled on an ethos for the entire record. It's simple. Underneath all of the production flex, does the song stand on its own?"

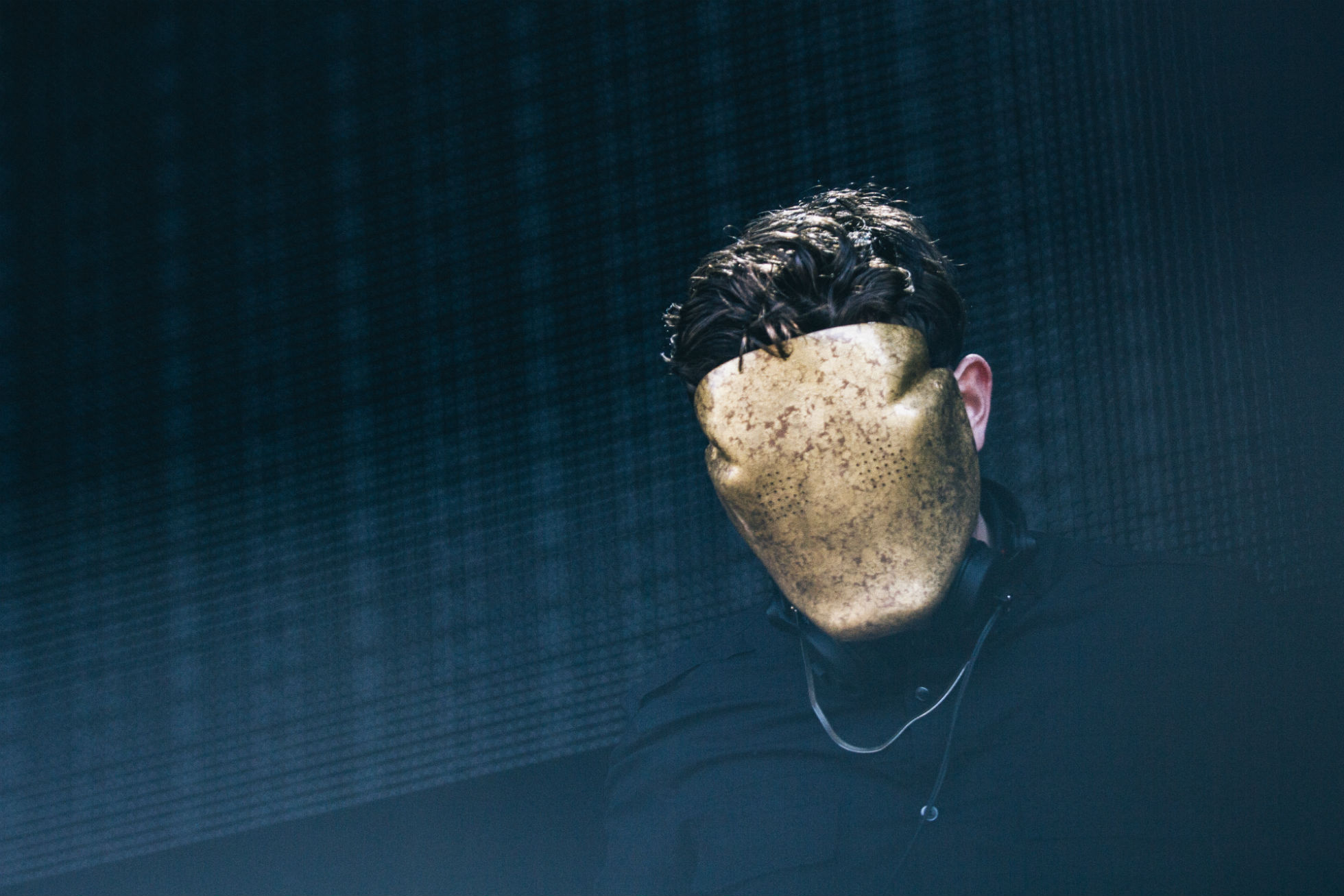
Thomas George Stell, known professionally as Golden Features

Sect has been called a "collaborative affair" rather than a "solitary creation". Stell has credited the help of both Harrison Mills of Odesza and Kim Moyes of the Presets in creating Sect: "I love [Harrison] because we can just critique the shit out of each other and there's no ego there. It's really natural." Stell continued, "I really like Harrison, I trust him, it felt more normal him helping than if it was a stranger pitching it."

== Reception ==
Sect has generally received positive reviews, with praise towards Golden Features' evolution of his signature sound. The release of the album was highly anticipated, according to EDMTunes editor F. Wilde, and takes an "innovative approach" on tracks like "Medicate" and exposes "creative agency" and "contrast[ing] sharp and soft textures" in tracks like "Woodcut" and "Worship". With the release of the album, Golden Features has been called "one of Australia’s most compelling electronic acts". Sect crosses genre boundaries "[f]rom the melodic tones of house, to the pop structures of indie electro" and Stell has "reinvented these influences into a distinct sound that is all his own".

Grant Gilmore of EDM Identity similarly commented on the album as an "electro-fueled journey" "blurring the line of indie and electronic".

Apple Music's editorial comments on the overall tone of Sect and notes its Ed Banger influences: "Themes of disorientation and intoxication are unshielded: 'Medicate, separate' and 'I'm high, all day, all night, always', for instance, are repeated as hypnotic mantras over thumping beats, like the soundtrack of a sweaty, strobe-light rave that picks up where Ed Banger Records' mid-2000s heyday left off."

Pilerats said The Golden Features project has a "quality over quantity element" which is "drenched in care and attention to detail".

Chris Salce of Acid Stag praises the production of Sect as a body of work — "a truly remarkable meeting of dark and deep house worlds that solidifies the signature sound we've all come to know". He continues, "Always" "showcases the trademark heavy electronica of Golden Features" and "Falling Out" is a "clear standout" with "contagious melodies".

Rudi K of Sputnik Music critiques the Australian electronic dance music scene and the place of the album within it. He states that Sect "won't do anything to dissuade critics of the cliché that Australia is perpetually one step and vast oceans behind everyone else when it comes to breaking new ground", continuing with "Golden Features isn't reinventing the wheel site yet, but there are worse artists to draw inspiration from. For now, Sect introduces a distinctive enough sound to make the future enticingly dark".

== Track listing ==
All music is composed by Thomas George Stell.

No.	Title	Music	Length
1.	"Always"		3:24
2.	"Medicate"		4:28
3.	"Runner"	Harrison Mills	4:37
4.	"Falling Out"	Matt Mason, Kimberly Moyes, Tommy O'Dell, Johnny Took	3:40
5.	"Woodcut"	Claire Rayner	4:05
6.	"Pyre"		2:45
7.	"Renewal"		3:59
8.	"Worship"	Sarah Rayner, Claire Rosemary, Nick Routledge	4:04
9.	"Everything"	Harrison Mills	4:52
10.	"1991"		6:06
Total length:			42:00

== Charts ==
Chart performance for Sect
Chart (2018)	Peak position
Australian Albums (ARIA)	11

== 2018 Australian tour ==
=== Shows and tour dates ===
Golden Features went on tour across Australia during August 2018 and visited the following cities.

Region	Date	Location
Australia	Saturday 11 August 2018	Hordern Pavilion, Sydney
Australia	Wednesday 15 August 2018	Eatons Hill Hotel, Brisbane
Australia	Friday 17 August 2018	HBF Stadium, Perth
Australia	Friday 24 August 2018	Thebarton Theatre, Adelaide
Australia	Saturday 25 August 2018	The Forum, Melbourne
Australia	Sunday 26 August 2018	The Forum, Melbourne
