= A Moment Apart =

Studio album by Odesza
- Released: September 8, 2017
- Genres: Indietronica; chillwave; future bass
- Length: 56:06
- Labels: Counter; Ninja Tune; Foreign Family Collective
- Producers: Harrison Mills; Clayton Knight

Odesza chronology
In Return (2014)	A Moment Apart (2017)	Bronson (2020)

Odesza albums chronology
In Return (2014)	A Moment Apart (2017)	The Last Goodbye (2022)

Singles from A Moment Apart
- 1. "Line of Sight" Released: April 25, 2017; 2. "Late Night" Released: April 25, 2017; 3. "Meridian" Released: June 12, 2017; 4. "Corners of the Earth" Released: June 12, 2017; 5. "Higher Ground" Released: July 11, 2017; 6. "Across The Room" Released: October 5, 2017

A Moment Apart is the third studio album by the American electronic music duo Odesza, released on 8 September 2017 through Counter, Ninja Tune and the duo's own label, Foreign Family Collective. It is the duo's first album in three years after their second album, In Return, and the first released through Foreign Family Collective.

The album was teased in March 2016 through social media. Afterwards, the singles "Line of Sight" and "Late Night" were released in April 2017 as the lead singles. Following the album's announcement in June, "Meridian" and "Corners of the Earth" were released as the third and fourth singles. "Higher Ground", the fifth single, was released in July and "Across The Room", the sixth and final single, was released in October. The album features contributions from Leon Bridges, Kelsey Bulkin, The Chamanas, Mansionair, Sasha Alex Sloan, Regina Spektor, Naomi Wild, WYNNE and RY X.

The album received positive reviews from critics, with praise toward its production values and composition, and debuted at #3 on the Billboard 200. The album was nominated for Best Dance/Electronic Album, with "Line of Sight" nominated for Best Dance Recording, at the 60th Grammy Awards.

The album's title track, "A Moment Apart", became one of Odesza's most widely recognized instrumental compositions. The song gained additional popularity after being featured in the opening cinematic and radio soundtrack of the racing video game Forza Horizon 4, where it accompanied the game's seasonal introduction sequence. Due to its cinematic build and atmospheric production, the track became closely associated with the game's introduction and is frequently noted by players as one of the series' most memorable opening themes. The song later returned in Forza Horizon 5 on the Horizon Mixtape radio station, which highlights notable tracks from previous games in the series.

== Background ==
Odesza, both Harrison Mills (Catacombkid) and Clayton Knight (BeachesBeaches), self-released their debut studio album, Summer's Gone, in September 2012. Two years later, they released their sophomore effort, In Return, in September 2014. It was their debut release on a record label, Ninja Tune, as well as its imprint, Counter Records. In contrast with Summer's Gone, In Return favored vocal and lyrical content more than sampling.

In November 2015, when asked about their third album, Harrison Mills stated that "we can obviously make In Return again, which maybe some people want and expect, but we don't want to do that. The big thing is deciding what the next album should be, because we have so many ideas."

The duo revealed the production of the then-unannounced album through social media in March 2016. Later that year, in December, three new compositions were played during the Day for Night Festival in Houston, Texas, of which one was the debut premiere of the song, "Late Night".

== Promotion ==
=== Multimedia ===
In April 2017, Odesza's Spotify artist page contained a playlist titled "...._/.._ _ _.....", which translates from Morse code to "4/25". After fan speculation, the duo released a video on Facebook the day prior to confirm the release of music on April 25.

=== Singles and music videos ===
On April 25, 2017, "Line of Sight", which guest features WYNNE and Mansionair, and "Late Night" were released as the lead singles from the album. With the announcement of the A Moment Apart on June 12, "Meridian" and '"Corners of the Earth", with RY X, were released as the third and fourth singles from the album. "Higher Ground", featuring Naomi Wild, was released on July 11 as the fifth single. On October 9, "Across The Room", featuring vocals from Leon Bridges, was released as the sixth single from the album.

A music video for "Late Night" was released on May 25, 2017, composed of video footage sent in by fans.

The title song "A Moment Apart" appeared in Forza Horizon 4 as the main title theme, as it plays while the camera pans around a McLaren Senna driving through the British countryside, as it changes through all four seasons. The song also appears on the Horizon Pulse radio station within the game, alongside another track from this album, "Late Night". "A Moment Apart" was later added to Forza Horizon 5's Horizon Mixtape radio station, a station dedicated to songs featured in previous Forza Horizon installments, upon its implementation into the game for the series' 10-year anniversary. The song can be unlocked through the Festival Playlist challenges.

YouTuber Eugene Lee Yang used "A Moment Apart" in his 'I'm Gay' coming out music video, along with "Intro" from the same album.

"La Ciudad", a non-single, was featured in the soccer video game FIFA 18.

Fate: The Winx Saga used the title track, "A Moment Apart" in Season 1, Episode 6 when Bloom, the main character, taps into her powers in a battle scene.

"Everything At Your Feet", a non-single, featuring Mexican indie pop group The Chamanas, was featured on the Horizon Pulse radio station in Forza Horizon 5.

== Artwork ==
The album cover was shot by English photographer Seanen Middleton, with the artwork design being accredited to Middleton, Harrison Mills and Michelle Gadeken. It features a woman, Rachel Putt, a fellow friend of Middleton, standing on a rocky incline, an orange line of light crossing out her eyes. The location where the cover was photographed was in Hodge Close, located in the Lake District of Northern England.

Two of Middleton's works, Vespertine and Moth to a Flame, were also purchased by Odesza and used as single artwork for "Line of Sight" and "Late Night", respectively.

== Commercial performance ==
The album charted at #3 in the United States in its first week.

== Reception ==
Professional ratings
Aggregate scores
Source	Rating
Metacritic	65/100
Review scores
Source	Rating
AllMusic	3.5/5 stars
Clash Music	6/10
Exclaim!	8/10
Pitchfork	5.8/10
PopMatters	6/10

A Moment Apart received generally positive reviews from critics, with significant praise (and slight criticism) towards the album's composition and production values. It has an assigned normalized rating of 65 out of 100 based on 6 critical reviews, indicating 'generally favorable reviews' from the review aggregator Metacritic.

Paul Simpson of AllMusic gave the album a positive review and called it "the duo's most ambitious, widescreen work yet." Dylan Barnabe, reviewing for Exclaim!, also praised the album, commenting that "both sides complement one another and make for a fully realized album filled with beautiful soundscapes and dreamy vocals."

Will Rosebury of Clash Music was more critical, stating that the album felt "stretched, verging on indulgent given the lack of variety" and concluding that it "fall[s] slightly short of the mark." Philip Sherburne of Pitchfork wrote that "the harder the band strive to reach sublimity, the more earthbound their music feels."

== Track listing ==
All tracks are written by Odesza (Harrison Mills and Clayton Knight) with featured artists, except where noted.

No.	Title	Writer(s)	Length
1.	"Intro"		1:03
2.	"A Moment Apart"		3:54
3.	"Higher Ground" (featuring Naomi Wild)		3:35
4.	"Boy"		3:03
5.	"Line of Sight" (featuring WYNNE & Mansionair)	Knight; Mills; Rory Wynne Andrew; Louis Bell	3:57
6.	"Late Night"	Mills; Knight; Kelcey Ayer; Matthew Frazier; Ryan Hahn; Andrew Hamm; Taylor Rice	3:48
7.	"Across the Room" (featuring Leon Bridges)		4:43
8.	"Meridian"		3:55
9.	"Everything at Your Feet" (featuring the Chamanas)		3:28
10.	"Just a Memory" (featuring Regina Spektor)		3:56
11.	"Divide" (featuring Kelsey Bulkin)		4:01
12.	"Thin Floors and Tall Ceilings"		2:58
13.	"La Ciudad"		4:31
14.	"Falls" (featuring Sasha Sloan)		3:52
15.	"Show Me"		3:38
16.	"Corners of the Earth" (featuring RY X)		5:05
Total length:			56:06

== Charts ==
=== Weekly charts ===
Chart (2017)	Peak position
Australian Albums (ARIA)	13
Belgian Albums (Ultratop Flanders)	62
Belgian Albums (Ultratop Wallonia)	59
Canadian Albums (Billboard)	27
Czech Albums (ČNS IFPI)	60
Dutch Albums (Album Top 100)	57
French Albums (SNEP)	146
New Zealand Albums (RMNZ)	32
Swiss Albums (Schweizer Hitparade)	45
UK Albums (Official Charts)	99
US Billboard 200	3
US Top Dance Albums (Billboard)	1

=== Year-end charts ===
Chart (2017)	Position
US Top Dance/Electronic Albums (Billboard)	8
Chart (2018)	Position
US Top Dance/Electronic Albums (Billboard)	5
Chart (2019)	Position
US Top Dance/Electronic Albums (Billboard)	6
Chart (2020)	Position
US Top Dance/Electronic Albums (Billboard)	12
Chart (2021)	Position
US Top Dance/Electronic Albums (Billboard)	16
Chart (2022)	Position
US Top Dance/Electronic Albums (Billboard)	25

=== Decade-end charts ===
Chart (2010–2019)	Position
US Top Dance/Electronic Albums (Billboard)	29
