= Yalda (disambiguation) =

Yaldā Night is an Iranian festival celebrating the winter solstice.

Yalda may also refer to:

== People ==
- Yalda Hakim, Afghan-Australian journalist and TV presenter
- Yalda Moaiery, Iranian photojournalist
- Yalda Samadi, Iranian musician

== Places ==
- Yalda, Syria

== Media ==
- Yalda, a Night for Forgiveness, Iranian film
