= Yalda Samadi =

- Birth name: یلدا صمدی
- Born: 22 December 1990 (age 34)
- Origin: Tehran, Iran
- Genres: Classical
- Occupation: Pianist
- Instrument: Piano
- Website: yaldasamadi.com

Yalda Samadi (Persian: یلدا صمدی; born December 22, 1990, Tehran) is an Iranian musician, pianist, and composer. Samadi has performed with musical groups such as Sharghi Ensembles, Simin Ghanem, Hengame Ghaziani, Ariana, Avaye Mehrabani, Noushe, and Chakavak Orchestra.

== Early life and education ==
Samadi was born in Tehran on December 22, 1990 to a musical family. She started receiving music lessons from her mother, a well-known cellist, at the age of 6.

She graduated from the University of Applied Science and Technology in Tehran with a bachelor's degree in Music (specialising in Piano Performance). Samadi learned piano from various pianists such as Chista Gharib, Mostafa Kamal Pourtorab, Tigran Mesroupian, Ehsan Sabouhi, Shaya Asadi, Behrang Shegerfkar, and Fariborz Lachini. In 2011, she was granted a scholarship for study in Hungary, where she studied with Ádám György.

== Career ==
Samadi started her career in 2008 and performed in Iran's National Orchestra, conducted by Bardia Kiaras. She also performed a piano duet concert with Shahrdad Rohani in Tehran and Gorgan.

She has been the soloist piano player of Naser Cheshmazar's concert, conducted by Armin Gheytasi in Tehran, Bandar-e-Anzali, and Shiraz. She has also been a piano soloist at the University of Applied Science and Technology's orchestra, conducted by Amin Ghaffari.

She has taught music and piano at Tehran's Conservatory and several musical institutes such as Lachini, Arasbaran, Ehteshami, and Navaye Shahr Aashoub.

In 2021, Yalda Samadi, along with Iranian musician and composer Reza Tajbakhsh, created the Yar Academy of Music and Yar Records in London and Tehran.

== Personal life ==
Samadi is married to Capt. Bardia Soleimani.

== See also ==
- Naser Cheshmazar
- Shahrdad Rohani
- Simin Ghanem
