= Sayverse =

Music band

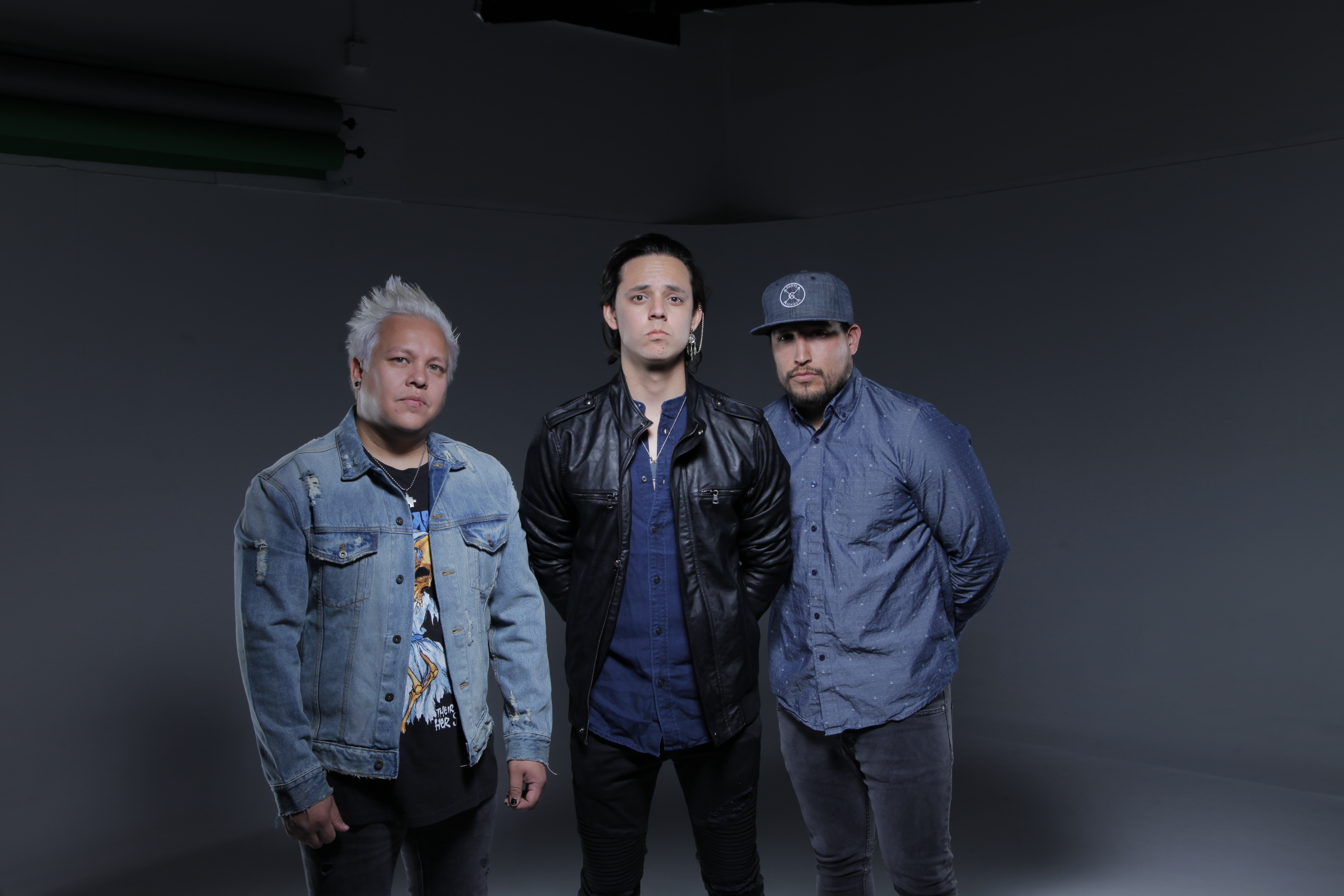
- Sayverse

Background information
- Origin: El Paso, Texas / Ciudad Juarez, Chihuahua
- Genres: Pop rock
- Years active: 2015-Present
- Members: Roger Argenis; Juan Arellano; Manny Martinez
- Website: sayverse.com

Sayverse, is a Latin pop rock band that originated in El Paso, Texas. The members are Roger Argenis (guitars), Juan Arellano (vocals), and Manny Martinez (drums). Sayverse came together in 2015 to bring a fresh sound to the pop rock scene in Latin America. In 2016, after only 10 months of making music, Sayverse was invited to perform at the 2016 Latin Billboard Awards.

In August 2016, the band scored a big success in Mexico with their single, "Decision". Their debut CD titled, "No Soy Yo, Eres Tu" was released on August 26, 2016. Sayverse toured Mexico for a month to promote the album and it included shows with Latin Grammy nominated band, The Chamanas. In 2026, Argenis received a "Best Children's Music Album" Grammy Award for his collaboration with Lucky Diaz and the Family Jam Band on their album ¡Brillo, Brillo!.
