= In Return (Odesza album) =

Studio album by Odesza
- Released: September 9, 2014
- Genre: Indietronica; synth-pop
- Length: 48:57
- Label: Counter; Ninja Tune
- Producer: Harrison Mills; Clayton Knight

Odesza chronology
My Friends Never Die (2013)	In Return (2014)	A Moment Apart (2017)

In Return is the second album by American electronic music duo Odesza, released on September 9, 2014, through Counter and Ninja Tune. It is the major label debut of the electronic duo after the release of their self-released debut album Summer's Gone two years prior and follows up that album.

The album debuted atop the Top Dance/Electronic Albums chart and was positively received by critics.

The "Say My Name" track (instrumental version) was used in Windows 10 Promotional and Retail Demo Video.

== Background and composition ==
During production, Mills and Knight were more open to experimentation, favoring more of a singer-songwriter approach with a greater focus on lyrical content. The result is a more vocally driven album, contrasting with their previous sample-based releases. Coming from a classically trained background, Knight was more concerned of the technicality of the music, while Mills focused on the production side. Knight's interest in pop and dance music influenced Mill's tastes, which contributed to the direction of the album. The track "It's Only" was distinguished by the duo as "the most mature growth [on the album]" due to its more unconventional production.

The album's name is a reference to the duo's appreciation of returning home after a long period of touring.

In Return was released a few weeks earlier than intended due to fan anticipation. On September 18, 2015, the deluxe edition of the album was released containing live and instrumental tracks from the standard edition album, in addition to the single "Light" featuring Little Dragon.

== Critical reception ==
In Return received positive reviews from critics. David Jeffries from AllMusic gave the album a rating of 4 out of 5, calling the album a "humble crowd-pleaser" while praising its variety. Renowned for Sound's Angus Fitz-Bugden gave a rating of 4/5, complimenting the album's ambience and production.

=== Accolades ===
In Return was nominated for Top Dance/Electronic Album at the 2016 Billboard Music Awards. The RAC remix of "Say My Name" was also nominated for Best Remixed Recording, Non-Classical at the 58th Annual Grammy Awards.

== Commercial performance ==
In Return debuted at number 1 on the Top Dance/Electronic Albums chart, selling 6,000 album-equivalent units in the first week. The album also debuted and peaked at number 42 on the Billboard 200.

== Track listing ==
Standard edition
No.	Title	Writer(s)	Length
1.	"Always This Late"	Harrison Mills; Clayton Knight	2:40
2.	"Say My Name" (featuring Zyra)	Mills; Knight; Alexandra Cheatle	4:22
3.	"Bloom"	Mills; Knight	3:15
4.	"All We Need" (featuring Shy Girls)	Mills; Knight; Dan Vidmar	3:31
5.	"Sundara"	Mills; Knight	2:16
6.	"White Lies" (featuring Jenni Potts)	Mills; Knight; Jenni Potts	4:37
7.	"Kusanagi"	Mills; Knight; Sean Kusanagi	3:28
8.	"Echoes" (featuring Py)	Mills; Knight; Jade Pybus	4:23
9.	"It's Only" (featuring Zyra)	Mills; Knight; Cheatle	4:28
10.	"Koto"	Mills; Knight	3:14
11.	"Memories That You Call" (featuring Monsoonsiren)	Mills; Knight; Monsoonsiren	4:08
12.	"Sun Models" (featuring Madelyn Grant)	Mills; Knight; Madelyn Grant	2:40
13.	"For Us" (featuring Briana Marela)	Mills; Knight; Briana Marela	5:49
Total length:			48:57

Deluxe edition bonus tracks
No.	Title	Writer(s)	Length
14.	"Light" (featuring Little Dragon)	Mills; Knight; Yukimi Nagano; Erik Bodin; Fredrik Källgren Wallin; Håkan Wirenstrand	4:13
15.	"IPlayYouListen (Live)"	Mills; Knight	4:29
16.	"Bloom (Live)"	Mills; Knight	3:30
17.	"Say My Name (Live)" (featuring Zyra)	Mills; Knight; Cheatle	4:06
18.	"Always This Late (Instrumental)"	Mills; Knight	2:40
19.	"Say My Name (Instrumental)"	Mills; Knight	4:02
20.	"Bloom (Instrumental)"	Mills; Knight	3:01
21.	"All We Need (Instrumental)"	Mills; Knight	3:31
22.	"Sundara (Instrumental)"	Mills; Knight	2:14
23.	"White Lies (Instrumental)"	Mills; Knight	4:37
24.	"Kusanagi (Instrumental)"	Mills; Knight	3:28
25.	"Echoes (Instrumental)"	Mills; Knight	4:10
26.	"It's Only (Instrumental)"	Mills; Knight	4:20
27.	"Koto (Instrumental)"	Mills; Knight	3:14
28.	"Memories That You Call (Instrumental)"	Mills; Knight	3:43
29.	"Sun Models (Instrumental)"	Mills; Knight	2:24
30.	"For Us (Instrumental)"	Mills; Knight	5:29
31.	"Light (Instrumental)"	Mills; Knight	4:13
Total length:			67:24

== Personnel ==
- Daddy Kev – mastering

== Charts ==
=== Weekly charts ===
Chart (2014)	Peak position
US Billboard 200	42
US Top Dance Albums (Billboard)	1
US Independent Albums (Billboard)	8

=== Year-end charts ===
Chart (2015)	Position
US Top Dance/Electronic Albums (Billboard)	6

Chart (2016)	Position
US Top Dance/Electronic Albums (Billboard)	16

Chart (2017)	Position
US Top Dance/Electronic Albums (Billboard)	10

Chart (2018)	Position
US Top Dance/Electronic Albums (Billboard)	10

Chart (2019)	Position
US Top Dance/Electronic Albums (Billboard)	16

=== Decade-end charts ===
Chart (2010–2019)	Position
US Top Dance/Electronic Albums (Billboard)	4
