= Golden Features =

Australian deep house/dance producer

- Born: Thomas George Stell; 1991 (age 34–35)
- Origin: Sydney, New South Wales, Australia
- Genres: Deep house; dance
- Occupations: DJ; producer
- Years active: 2013–present
- Labels: Parlophone; Warner
- Website: goldenfeatures.com

Thomas George Stell (born 1991), known professionally as Golden Features, is an Australian deep house / dance DJ and producer currently signed to Warner Bros. Records. Three singles, "Tell Me" featuring Nicole Millar, "No One" featuring Thelma Plum, and "Wolfie" featuring Julia Stone; received listener's votes for the Triple J Hottest 100. They were listed, successively, at No. 101 in 2014, No. 92 in 2015, and No. 70 in 2016. Golden Features performed at the Hard festival in 2016. His debut album, Sect (26 July 2018), reached No. 11 on the ARIA Albums Chart.

== Career ==
=== 2013-2017: Career commencement and EPs ===
Tom Stell has performed as Golden Features since 2014. When Peking Duk members, Adam Hyde and Reuben Styles, relocated from Canberra to Sydney they shared a house with Stell for a year. He recalled, "Those two are like my brothers and without both of their support and guidance the Golden Features project never would have seen the light of day."

Golden Features adopted a gold mask for performances and initially maintained his anonymity. He explained, "You go out, you do whatever you have to do, you put it out there in the world, and you don't expect personal credit for it. You just do it because it satisfies you... I didn't want my face plastered over things just because I prefer to have a character that I speak through." As a solo artist, he released a four-track self-titled extended play in February 2014. After he revealed his name, he observed, "it became a gimmick and people became more interested in who is making the music rather than the music itself. So I cut it off and put my face up everywhere. The initial idea was like the music speak for itself, it backfired but I stand by it."

The producer provided a remix version for the Presets' single, "No Fun" (August 2014), which made it to No. 13 on the ARIA Club Tracks. His EP provided a single, "Tell Me" featuring Nicole Millar, in the following month, which reached No. 14 on the ARIA Dance Singles and No. 7 on the ARIA Hitseekers Singles charts. It missed being listed on the Triple J Hottest 100, 2014, and was placed in the Second Hottest 100 (101–200) at No. 101.

The artist's second four-track EP, XXIV, was released in June 2015, and reached No. 56 on the ARIA Singles Chart. The reviewer from Oz EDM felt, "[he] is known for his genre-bending signature sound (apart from his Mask)... [the EP] offers nothing short of amazing production and originality and genuinely is something for dance fans to get excited about." Its lead single, "No One" featuring Thelma Plum, peaked at No. 58 on the same chart. "No One" was listed at No. 92 on the Triple J Hottest 100, 2015.

In 2016 Golden Features released, "Wolfie" featuring Julia Stone, which reached No. 70 in Triple J Hottest 100, 2016. Pilerats' Troy Mutton described, "it proved a little surprising to some. Not the out-and-out dark and brooding banger we've come to expect from [him], rather something sweeter, less intense. It's so sweet in fact that it's named after – and features a sound byte from – his young nephew... [Stone's] twee, Australian lilt is toned down ever-so-slightly to create something that is somehow both melancholic and euphoric."

Golden Features supported Alison Wonderland on her tour of the United States in 2016 and undertook his own headlining tour of the US in February of the next year.

=== 2018-present: Sect and Sisyphus ===
Golden Features released his debut album, Sect, on 26 July 2018, which reached No. 11 on the ARIA Albums Chart and No. 1 on the iTunes Chart. Sect was named a Triple J feature album, described as being an "eclectic mix of driving beats, dark choruses, blistering drops and ethereal vocals".

Golden Features appeared on the Coachella DoLab stage during the first weekend of the 2019 festival.

In July 2020 Golden Features collaborated with Odesza and released the project Bronson, the ten track album features appearances from lau.ra, Gallant, and Totally Enormous Extinct Dinosaurs. Bronson debuted number 22 on the ARIA Albums Chart and at number 5 in the United States on Billboard's Top Dance/Electronic Albums Chart.

In 2022, Golden Features released "Touch" and "Vigil" and toured the United States of America in September of that year.

In June 2023, Golden Features announced the release of his second studio album, Sisyphus.

== Discography ==
=== Studio albums ===
List of studio albums, with release date and selected chart positions shown
Title	Album details	Peak chart positions
Title	Album details	AUS
Sect	Released: 26 July 2018; Format: CD, LP, digital download; Label: Warner Music Australasia (5419700814)	11
Sisyphus	Released: 7 July 2023; Format: CD, LP, digital download, streaming; Label: Warner Music Australasia (5419771674)	(Note: Sisyphus did not enter the ARIA Top 100 Album Chart, but peaked at number 13 on the Australian Artists Album Chart.)

=== Collaborative albums ===
List of collaborative albums, with release date and label shown
Title	Album details	Peak chart positions	
Title	Album details	AUS	US Dance
Bronson (with Odesza as Bronson)	Released: 7 August 2020; Formats: Digital download, streaming; Label: Warner Music Australia (Australia) Ninja Tune / Foreign Family Collective (International)	23	5

=== Extended plays ===
List of extended plays, with release date and selected chart positions shown
Title	EP details	Peak chart positions
Title	EP details	AUS
Golden Features	Released: 28 March 2014; Label: Warner Music Australia (825646215379); Format: Digital download, streaming	—
XXIV	Released: 19 June 2015; Label: Parlophone; Format: Digital download, streaming	56
Raka (with The Presets)	Released: 15 November 2019; Label: Modular Records, EMI; Format: Digital download, streaming	—
Sisyphus Remixes	Released: 2024; Label: Modular Records; Format: Digital download, streaming	—

=== Singles ===
==== As lead artist ====
List of singles as lead artist, with year released and album shown
Title	Year	Chart positions	Certifications	Album
Title	Year	AUS	Certifications	Album
"Tell Me" (featuring Nicole Millar)	2014	—		Golden Features
"Baxter"	2015	—		XXIV
"No One" (featuring Thelma Plum)	2015	58		XXIV
"Wolfie"/"Funeral"	2016	—		double-A sided single
"Falling Out"	2018	—		Sect
"Worship"	2018	—	ARIA: Gold	Sect
"Always"	2018	—		Sect
"Woodcut" (featuring Rromarin)	2018	—		Sect
"Paradise" (with The Presets)	2019	—	ARIA: Gold	Raka
"Raka" (with The Presets)"	2019	—		Raka
"Touch"	2022	—		Sisyphus
"Vigil"	2022	—		Sisyphus
"Endit" (with Rromarin)	2022	—		Sisyphus
"Flesh"	2023	—		Sisyphus

== Awards and nominations ==
=== ARIA Music Awards ===
The ARIA Music Awards is an annual award ceremony event celebrating the Australian music industry.

Year	Nominee / work	Award	Result	Ref.
2023	Sisyphus	Best Dance/Electronic Release	Nominated	
