= Chris Yonge =

Canadian rapper and sound producer (born 1991)

- Born: Christopher Stiliadis; December 26, 1991 (age 34)
- Origin: Toronto, Ontario, Canada
- Genres: Canadian hip hop
- Occupations: Singer, rapper, producer, composer, sound engineer
- Years active: 2012–present
- Website: Official website

Chris Stiliadis (born December 26, 1991), better known by his stage name Chris Yonge, is a Canadian rapper, producer and sound engineer from Toronto, Ontario. His notable accolades include a Grammy nomination for Songwriting and Engineering, as well as a Juno nomination for his work as Producer, Songwriter, Mixer, and Mastering Engineer. Born and raised in Old Toronto, to a Greek father and German mother, he first gained recognition with his debut EP Presence released in 2015. He is perhaps best known for his 2016 single "TGIF", which went on to be featured in his second EP, Negatives, released in 2017. His third EP, SS17, was released later that year.

He released his debut album Intro, in 2018 which was supported with the singles "Wax On", "Growing Pains" and "Sometimes", and was entirely produced by himself. His collaborative project with Ollie, Maybe This Was Supposed to Happen, which saw him executive produce the album, was released in 2020. He recently released his second self produced album, Maybe I've Gone Mad.

== Life and career ==
=== 1991–2010: Early life ===
Chris Stiliadis was born on December 26, 1991, in Old Toronto, to a Greek father and German mother. He attended high school at Ursula Franklin Academy and it was in these years he found himself becoming increasingly passionate about making music. He has an older brother, Sebastian, and has described himself as "creative" and "full of energy", stating that he enjoyed making music and short films.

=== 2011–2014: Career beginnings ===
Stiliadis began his music career at the age of 19 in 2011 taking on the stage name Chris Yonge, although at the time he considered it a hobby and did not consider it career-wise whilst enrolled at Ryerson University. He released his debut single "This Ain't Love" on May 15, 2011, to little recognition. He then released the single "Lay Back" on October 6, 2012, via Concord Music Group on the channel Swagy Tracks, the same platform which gave recognition to artists Logic and C-Sick. He released his debut mixtape Sunday Mornings on March 3, 2013. On March 11, 2014, Yonge released his second mixtape Late Nights, Early Mornings. Yonge also supported the 2014 Canadian Music Week festival held between May 6–10, in which 1000 other artists performed. Steve Kane, president of Warner Music Canada, acknowledged Yonge and other artists for their support in the festival.

=== 2015–2018: EPs and Intro ===
In early 2015, Yonge announced that he is working on his debut EP, Presence in which all production and vocals will be done by him. The 14 track EP was officially released on September 1, 2015, as a free download on his official website, and was supported by the singles "Twenty Four Seven", "Rejection" and "Waiting". After the release of his debut EP, Yonge returned to music with the release of the single "TGIF" on April 8, 2016, and was added to Volume 27 of HipHop Canada's Weekly Picks. Yonge also began his career in music production, overlooking sound-production, composing, creative direction, voiceover direction and mixing under his birth name, Chris Stiliadis. He went on to assist in sound for Mariah Carey's 2016 performance at Saks Fifth Avenue Holiday Window Unveiling at Toronto Eaton Centre. In December 2016, Chris became a member of the team at Boombox Sound, a Toronto recording studio, as a composer, voice director, and music producer.

On May 14, 2017, Yonge released the single "Deep End" via Record Union, which was followed by the singles, "Solstice", "6ft" and "Drip Drip". The singles were added to volume 29, volume 30, volume 34, and volume 42 of Hip Hop Canada's Weekly picks, respectively. In the following weeks, he was an opening act for the Australian rock band, Nick Cave and the Bad Seeds show in Toronto held on May 31, 2017, at Massey Hall whilst they were on their world tour. He released his fourth tape, Negatives on July 5, 2017, which was supported by the singles released earlier in the year. Upon returning to Toronto, Yonge teamed up with singer Ras Hamma to release the single "U&ME" via Swagy Tracks on October 23, 2017. This was followed by the single "19" featuring Kaelen, which was released on November 15, 2017. Both tracks went on to be featured in Yonge's third EP SS17 released on November 17, 2017. Yonge released his last song of the year with the single "DRNKTXTS" released on December 15, 2017.

In 2018, Hip Hop Canada released Episode 9 of the mixtape series The 12 Pack curated by Mojointz. Yonge made an appearance on track 5 with the single "Cream" and was released on June 13, 2018. Although he had stated he was working on his debut studio album; Intro since 2017, Yonge announced that his debut project is due to be released later in the year. The album was officially released on October 5, 2018, and was entirely produced by Yonge himself. The album contained 10 tracks and was released via 126 sound. It features vocals from Lil Pesha, Crete Oxford, Bells, and Young Dumplings.

=== 2019 : Maybe This Was Supposed to Happen ===
Yonge composed the theme song to the podcast "Pivot to the Future" hosted by Will.i.am and Omar Abbosh which ran from May 30, 2019, to October 22, 2019. In August 2019, Tim Hortons partnered with Shawn Mendes in a campaign which saw Yonge as an audio producer for the campaign. On December 19, 2019, Yonge released the single "Low" The self-produced track highlights the ups and downs of life. Chris Yonge released his first-ever music video for his first single of 2020, "Cash". The single was released on January 24, 2020, and was directed by Elliott Muscat and Christian Tyler. It was noted by The Fader as "playing out like nearly every stoner movie you've ever seen with an underlying message about the lengths people will go to for money". The single is said to be featured in Yonge's sophomore project, which is expected to drop sometime in 2021.

Canadian pop-artist Ollie announced he is working on his debut album Maybe This Was Supposed to Happen. The album was set to be a collaborative project in which Yonge entirely produces the album for Ollie. In promotion of the album, Ollie and Yonge announced a North America tour which was supposed to be held between April 1–May 7, 2020. Yonge was also supposed to perform at the 2020 Toronto Fringe Festival, however due to the COVID-19 pandemic, both the festival and tours were cancelled and meant Yonge could not perform. Maybe This Was Supposed to Happen was officially released on April 23, 2020, and also saw a vocal feature from Yonge on the song "Change". Yonge was also in charge of the music production and composition for the "This is not a Drake Podcast" hosted by CBC, released on July 7, 2020. For the remainder of the year, he went on to release the singles "Stay", "Yonge Love", and "Cruel".

=== 2021 - Present: cool kids are dead ===
Yonge produced all the tracks in Arts and Crafts's signee Charlie Houston's debut EP I Hate Spring. The lead single Calls was debuted as a Zane Lowe world premier and he is quoted saying "I love that record, that is effortless" on his Apple Music podcast January 13, 2021 . All three singles landed New Music Friday USA as well as an array of other popular playlists. Later on in the year Charlie dropped bitches in the bathroom which Yonge also produced, this landed her a NYC times square billboard as well as an article in Rolling Stone magazine which notes Yonge as a key collaborator.

Yonge collaborates with Justin Nozuka and produces a 2 track EP titled nova, released on August 6, 2021.

Yonge tours with Ollie through Dallas, Phoenix and Denver as the opening act on the More Than Music Tour, October, 2021.

=== Studio albums ===
- 2018: Intro
- 2023: Maybe I've Gone Mad

=== Collaborative albums ===
- 2020: Maybe This Was Supposed to Happen (with Ollie)
- 2021: I Hate Spring (with Charlie Houston)
- 2021: Nova (with Justin Nozuka)
- 2022: Bad Posture (with Charlie Houston)
- 2023: Heartbreak Hill (with JON VINYL)
- 2024: Chlorine (with Justin Nozuka)

=== Extended plays ===
- 2015: Presence
- 2017: Negatives
- 2017: SS17
