= Bronson (group) =

Collaborative project between producers Odesza and Golden Features

- Genres: Electronic; Tech house; House music
- Instrument: Digital audio workstation
- Years active: 2020–present
- Labels: Warner Music Australasia, Ninja Tune, Foreign Family Collective
- Members: Golden Features (Thomas George Stell); Odesza (Harrison Mills and Clayton Knight)
- Website: wearebronson.com

Bronson is an Australian-American electronic dance music trio, composed of record producer Golden Features (Thomas George Stell) and the duo Odesza (Harrison Mills and Clayton Knight). The project formed in early 2019. They are signed to Warner Music Australasia, Ninja Tune and Odesza's own label Foreign Family Collective.

== History ==
The work for Bronson started once Stell had finished up work on his debut album Sect. The trio of producers had previously bonded on the 2016 Groovin the Moo festival circuit, but they made concrete plans to work together after Odesza played St Jerome's Laneway Festival in 2018. After the festival, they rented a house in Berry, New South Wales, with no aim in mind.

== Discography ==
=== Studio albums ===
List of studio albums, with release date and label shown
Title	Details	Peak chart positions
Title	Details	AUS
Bronson (Odesza and Golden Features as Bronson)	Released: August 7, 2020; Formats: Digital download, streaming; Label: Warner Music Australia (Australia), Ninja Tune / Foreign Family Collective (International)	22

=== Singles ===
List of singles, with year released, selected chart positions and certifications, and album name shown
Title	Year	Peak chart positions	Album
Title	Year	NZ	Album
"Heart Attack" (Golden Features and Odesza as Bronson; featuring Lau.ra)	2020	— (Note: "Heart Attack" did not enter the NZ Top 40 Singles Chart, but did peak at number twenty-five on the NZ Hot Singles Chart.)	Bronson
"Vaults"	2020	—	Bronson
"Dawn" (featuring Totally Enormous Extinct Dinosaurs)	2020	—	Bronson
"Keep Moving"	2020	—	Bronson
