= Zyra (singer) =

ZYRA
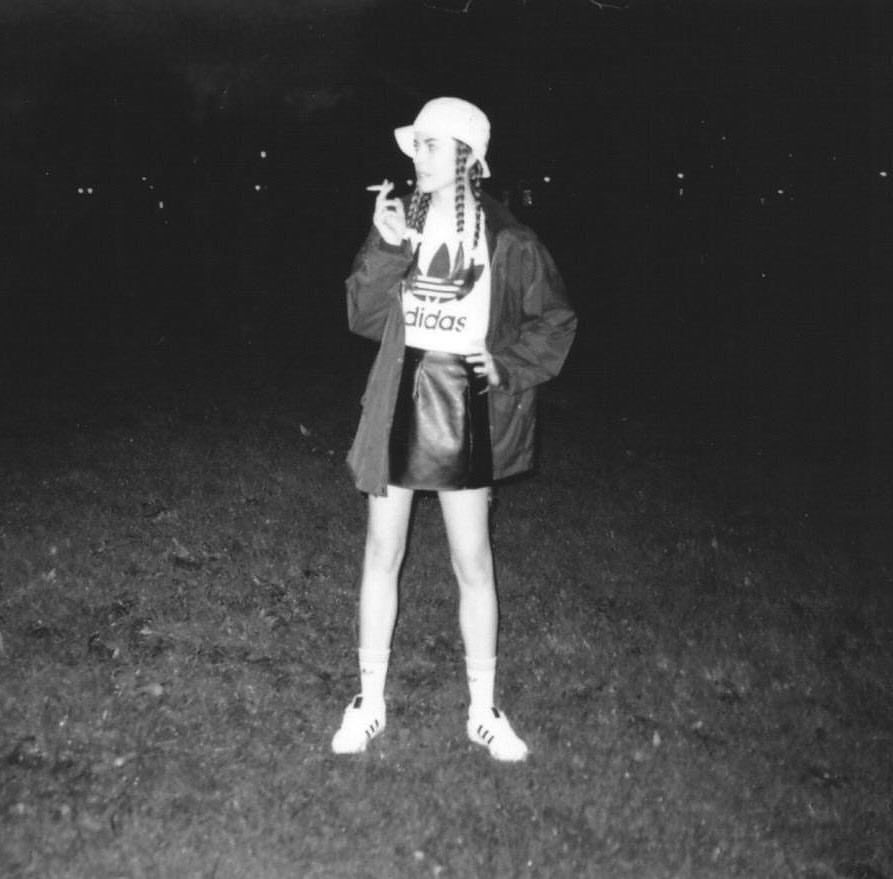
- Zyra in 2016

Background information
- Also known as: ZYRA
- Born: Alexandra Cheatle; 6 June 1994 (age 31); Leicester, England
- Genres: Pop, electronic
- Occupations: Singer-songwriter, record producer
- Instruments: Vocals, piano, guitar
- Years active: 2014–present
- Website: www.facebook.com/zyramusic

Alexandra Cheatle (born 6 June 1994), known by her stage name Zyra, is an English singer, songwriter and record producer.

== Musical career ==
=== Breakthrough ===
In July 2014, Cheatle adopted the alias Zyra. The following month, she featured as a guest vocalist on a number of tracks she had written for the sophomore release from Seattle production duo, Odesza. "Say My Name" peaked at number 2 on the iTunes US electronic charts as an initial single release, while the album, In Return quickly reached the top of the US electronic album chart, peaking at 20 in the main chart.

=== Awards ===
Cheatle became the youngest person ever to receive a Make It Break It Songwriting Award in October 2009, winning the UK national songwriting competition The Make It Break It Awards (formerly known as The National Youth Rock and Pop Awards). The judging panel of industry professionals who chose Alex's song 'People Talk About Us' as their winner included; Coldplay's Chris Martin, record producer Steve Levine, and Guy Moot. Chris Martin of Coldplay is among the competitions alumni winners. On 7 December 2015 "Say My Name (RAC Remix) ft. Zyra" was nominated for a Grammy.

== Discography ==
=== Albums ===
Year	Title	Track No.
2021	Therapy	15
2022	ZYRA	9
2024	Sober	16
2024	F*** You	18

=== Singles ===
Year	Title
2020	This Ain't Love (Sulvida Remix)
2021	Nothing Without You
2021	Someone Else
2021	Closer
2021	This Ain't Love
2021	Take Me Home
2021	Obvious
2022	Show Me How To Love
2022	You Got the Love
2022	Real Love

==== Featured singles ====
Year	Title	Peak chart positions	Album
Year	Title	US Dance	Album
2015	ODESZA - Say My Name (Feat. Zyra)	16	In Return
2016	ODESZA - Its Only (Feat. Zyra)	-	In Return
2021	Beks - Devoted (Zyra Remix)	-	Devoted - The Remixes
2022	Sofasound - Wasted (Feat. Zyra)		Wasted
