= Up the Establishment =

1969 film

- Directed by: Michael Verhoeven
- Written by: Franz Geiger
- Produced by: Jürgen Dohme; Rob Houwer
- Starring: Mario Adorf; Gila von Weitershausen; Ulli Koch
- Cinematography: Werner Kurz; Edgar Scholz
- Edited by: Monika Pfefferle
- Music by: Axel Linstädt
- Production company: Houwer-Film
- Distributed by: Constantin Film
- Release date: 13 January 1969
- Running time: 90 minutes
- Country: West Germany
- Language: German

Up the Establishment (German: Engelchen macht weiter – hoppe, hoppe Reiter) is a 1969 West German comedy film directed by Michael Verhoeven and starring Mario Adorf, Gila von Weitershausen and Ulli Koch.

== Partial cast ==
- Mario Adorf as Augustin 'Gustl' Wohlfahrt
- Gila von Weitershausen as Helene Wohlfahrt
- Ulli Koch as Walter Holl
- Christof Wackernagel as Wimpie Brückner
- Dieter Augustin as Dr. Florian 'Flori' Kainz
- Ilse Pagé as Inge
- Gert Wiedenhofen as Schenk
- Inken Sommer as Kundin
- Günter Clemens as Briefträger
- Elisabeth Volkmann as Frau Schubert

== Bibliography ==
- Reimer, Robert C. & Reimer, Carol J. The A to Z of German Cinema. Scarecrow Press, 2010.
