= Simin Ghanem =

Iranian singer (born 1944)

Simin Ghanem سیمین غانم
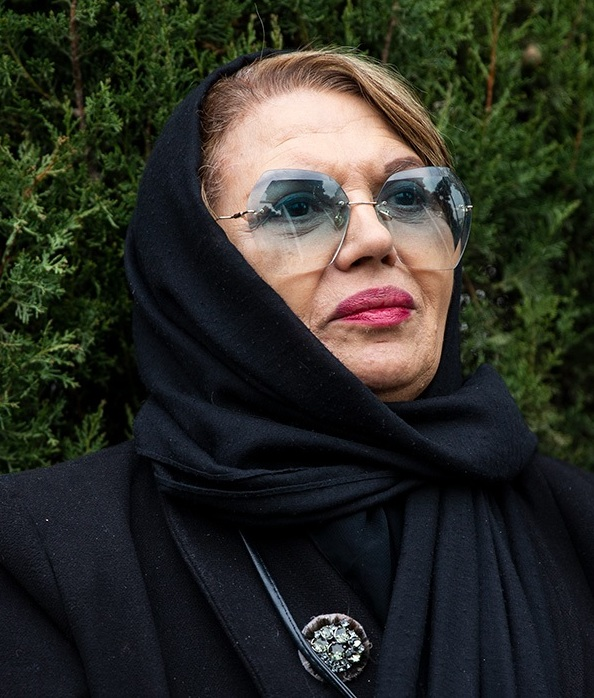
- Ghanem in 2019

Background information
- Born: 11 April 1946 (age 80); Tonekabon, Iran
- Genre: Pop
- Occupation: Singer
- Instrument: Vocals
- Years active: 1969–present

Simin Ghanem (Persian: سیمین غانم‌; born 11 April 1946) is an Iranian classical and pop singer. Ghanem started singing at the age of 9. She was the best singer in the "Iran's school competition" in 1962. After 7 years she started professional singing with a TV program named Mowj-e Khorooshan (1969).

== Career ==
Born in Tonekabon, Ghanem started singing when she was 9. In 1962, she was the best singer in the Iranian school competition. Seven years later she started her professional singing career with the TV program Mowj-e Khorooshan.

She studied Iranian traditional music with Morteza Hannaneh & Ali Tajvidi, who were of the professional musicians of the time in Iran. Her first song in this style was "Ghollak-e cheshat" (قلک چشات, lit. 'The Piggy bank of your eyes'), which was one of the most popular songs in Iran for many years. Her most famous song is "Gol-e goldoun" (گل گلدون, lit. 'The Pot's flower').

The American electronic music duo Odesza used samples of Ghanem's song "Sib" (سیب, lit. 'Apple') on the track Behind the Sun from the album The Last Goodbye.

== Discography ==
Her famous songs include:

- Gol-e Goldoun, compose: Fariborz Lachini
- Mard-e man
- Parandeh
- Ghollak-e cheshat, Composer: Fariborz Lachini
- Tarh-e zolfanat
- Sib, composer: Fariborz Lachini, lyrics: Farhad Sheybani
- Stash (?)
- Ham-nafas
- Raghs-e baroun
- Dela

== See also ==
- Pari Zanganeh
