= Hector Carreon =

Mexican musician and songwriter

- Born: Hector Jesus Carreon Zuñiga; December 11, 1985 (age 40); Saltillo, Coahuila, Mexico
- Occupations: Musician; songwriter; recording engineer; vocal producer
- Instruments: Guitar; bass guitar; drums; vocals
- Years active: 2006–present
- Labels: Cosmica Artists, Los Maxicos
- Website: thechamanas.com

Hector "Mije" Carreon is a Mexican musician and songwriter. He was born on December 11, 1985, as Hector Jesus Carreon Zuñiga in Saltillo, Coahuila, Mexico.

== Early years ==
At the age of five, Carreon moved to Ciudad Juárez, a border town with El Paso, Texas. He was raised in a unique town culture, where Mexican and American language and traditions blended. This had a profound influence on Carreon. He had the uncommon opportunity to live in Mexico and cross the border every day to attend school in the United States.

Carreon began playing the guitar at age 11 in a choir at his school, Father Yermo Elementary, where a nun by the name of Sister Elizabeth taught him to play. He later joined a choir from San Lorenzo in Ciudad Juárez and decided to pursue music as a career. Today religious music is still one of his biggest influences. At the age of 14 he began writing songs focusing on love, and his experiences as a teenager.

In 2005 he enrolled in El Paso Community College as a music major but later dropped out to focus on musical projects that he found more interesting.

== Career ==
Codek was his first professional project (2007), an electro-pop duo that received national exposure. This was the first time Carreon was a singer, guitar player, and songwriter for a large project.

By 2011, Carreon earned his recording engineer certification at Los Angeles Recording Connection. He soon became an intern at the Sonic Ranch recording studio, and was officially employed there in 2012.

At Sonic Ranch, he was able to work with acclaimed artists and contribute to important recordings, including: Sublime, Snarky Puppy, Alex Campos, Natalia Lafourcade, Ximena Sariñana, Ely Guerra, Jesus Adrian Romero, Intocable, Los Rieleros del Norte, La Firma, Conjunto Primavera and David Garza.

Carreon has also worked with distinguished producers and engineers such as:

- Stephen Short
- Sebastian Kryz (Grammy for Producer of the Year 2015)
- Rafael Arcaute (Calle 13)
- Darrel Thorp (Beck)
- Hugo Nicolson (Radiohead)
- Ryan Hewwit (Red Hot Chili Peppers)
- Camilo Froideval (Ely Guerra)
- Cachorro Lopez (Vicentico)

While working at the studio, Carreon became a close friend with Manuel Calderon, later to start collaborating making music. Related to music business, Carreon started developing marketing and digital marketing skills that helped reach larger audiences in the upcoming projects and led to the founding of Carzuga, which was in charge of the marketing aspects of The Chamanas.

=== The Chamanas ===
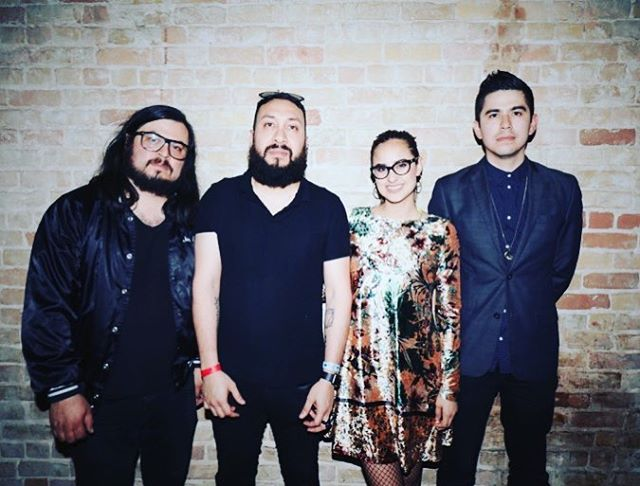
The Chamanas

In 2015 their first album, Once Once, won Best Pop Album at the Independent Music Awards (IMAS) in Mexico.

Portugal. The Man, the American rock band, invited The Chamanas to do the Spanish version of their single "Purple Yellow Red and Blue". Carreon adapted the lyrics and it is one of the band’s most noteworthy songs.

In 2016 The Chamanas were nominated for a Latin Grammy as Best New Artist.

In 2017 Carreon composed the songs for The Chamana’s second album NEA which is dedicated to his mother and brother who recently died. The songs "Masunea" and "Puerta" talk about death, love, longing, and unity.

He also composed the song "Everything At Your Feet" with EDM project Odesza.

== Awards and achievements ==
Carreon has been the recipient of six Latin Grammy’s, three Grammy awards for engineering, and three Latin Grammy Nominations with artists like Natalia Lafourcade, and Snarky Puppy, Alex Campos, and Intocable.

In 2016 The Chamanas were nominated for a Latin Grammy as Best New Artist.
