= XXIV (EP) =

EP by Golden Features
- Released: 19 June 2015
- Length: 17:53
- Labels: Parlophone, Warner Music

Golden Features chronology
Golden Features (2014)	XXIV (2015)	Sect (2018)

Singles from XXIV
- 1. "Baxter" Released: April 2015; 2. "No One" Released: June 2015

XXIV is the second EP by Australian electronic dance music artist Golden Features released in June 2015. The EP debuted and peaked at number 56 on the ARIA Chart.

== Reception ==
Roshan Clerke from The Music said "This latest small collection continues his path down the dark electronic-music rabbit hole. Thelma Plum delivers a moody feature on the anthemic 'No One', while K.Flay nimbly tumbles through the kaleidoscopic 'Telescope'. Bookended by two thumping tracks, this meticulously focused release maintains the mystique."

OZ EDM gave it a 4/5 saying "The four track EP offers nothing short of amazing production and originality and genuinely is something for dance fans to get excited about."

== Track listing ==
XXIV
No.	Title	Writer(s)	Length
1.	"Baxter"	Thomas Stell	4:52
2.	"No One" (featuring Thelma Plum)	Stell	4:55
3.	"Telescope" (featuring K.Flay)	Stell, Kristine Flaherty	3:08
4.	"Do You?"	Stell	4:57
Total length:			17:53

== Charts ==
Chart performance for XXIV
Chart (2015)	Peak position
Australia (ARIA)	56
