= University of Applied Science and Technology =

Public university in Iran

- دانشگاه جامع علمی - کاربردی; Dāneshgah-e Jām'e Elmi Kārbordi
- Type: Public university system
- Established: 1992
- Affiliations: Ministry of Science, Research and Technology
- Location: Iran; 35°42′6.47″N 51°21′5.18″E
- Colours: Gold
- Website: uast.ac.ir

The University of Applied Science and Technology (UAST) (Persian: دانشگاه جامع علمی - کاربردی Dāneshgah-e Jām'e Elmi Kārbordi) is a public university in Iran administrated by the Ministry of Science, Research and Technology. It was established in 1992 and has 1500 education centers in various provinces of Iran. This university helps to increase skill level of employed personnel in various sectors of economic field and graduates of higher education and professional skills that are lacking in administrative.

== See also ==
- Higher education in Iran
- List of universities in Iran
