= The Chamanas =

Mexican indie pop band

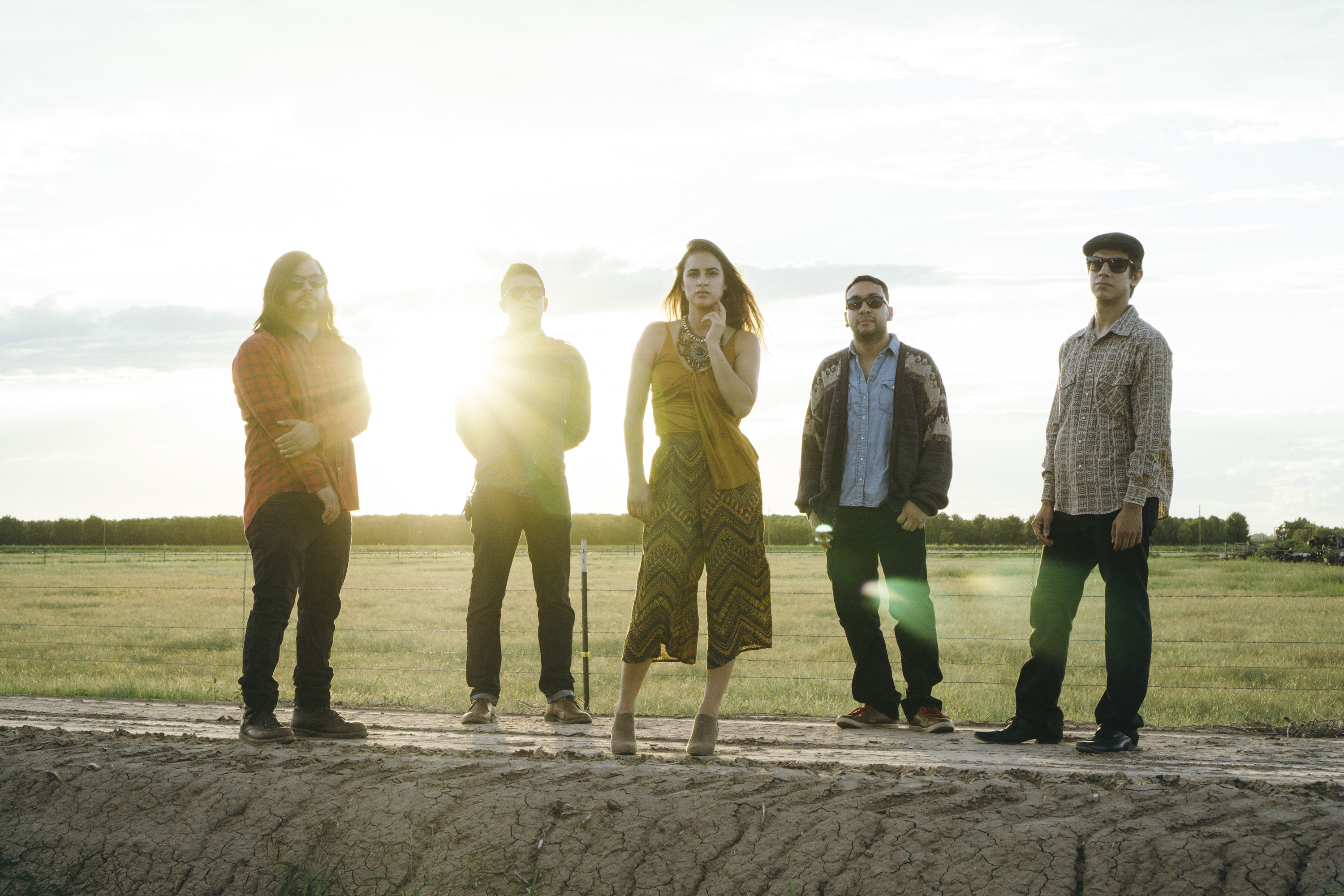
- The Chamanas by Diego Lucero

Background information
- Origin: Ciudad Juárez, Chihuahua and El Paso, Texas
- Genres: indie pop
- Years active: 2013–present
- Labels: Los Maxicos, Cosmica Artists
- Members: Hector Carreon; Manager: Gerardo Alarcón
- Website: www.thechamanas.com

The Chamanas are a Mexican indie pop band.

The band was started by Manuel Calderon and Hector "Mije" Carreon. Paulina Reza, and Alejandro Bustillos later joined the band. The group's music has Central and South American influences. The band's name combines English and Spanish terms, and refers to Shamanism.

== Career ==
The Chamanas signed with independent record labels, Casete Mexico and Nacional Records, in the beginning of 2015 and later released their first EP Fronterizo. Their first album, Once Once, which was recorded at Sonic Ranch, followed in August of the same year. Once Once won Best Pop Album at the Independent Music Awards (IMAS) in Mexico. The Chamanas opened for a number of bands such as Zoe, Vetusta Morla, Enjambre, Jarabe de Palo and Nina Diaz.

In 2016 The Chamanas were nominated as Best New Artist at the Latin Grammys. They have performed at festivals such as LAMC (NY), Vive Latino (CD.MX.), SXSW (Austin, TX), JRZ Music Fest (Juarez) and ALMAX (Colombia) and collaborated with bands including Portugal The Man, Beach House, Odesza, Enjambre, and Dave Sitek from TV On The Radio. A new version of their album, Once Once Deluxe, included three songs featuring Los Angeles Negros

== Discography ==
- Dulce Mal (Single 2014)
- Regalo de Reyes (Single 2014)
- Te Juro Que Te Amo (Single 2015)
- Fronterizo EP (2015)
- Once Once (2015)
- Once Once Deluxe (2016)
- El Farol(Single 2017)
- Feel It Still (Single 2017)

== Videos/TV ==
The Chamanas has released several music videos including Portugal. The Man's huasteco version of Purple Yellow Red & Blue; Alas de Hierro and Ramas that were directed and produced by Autumn Leave Films; Dulce Mal, directed by Paco Ibarra' and Los Terricolas cover of Te Juro Que Te Amo, which was made exclusively with cellphone cameras.

Their music has been used in HBO Latinoamerica's series "Sr. Ávila" that was filmed in Mexico City.
