= Bronson (album) =

Studio album by Bronson (Odesza and Golden Features)
- Released: 7 August 2020
- Recorded: 2018–2020
- Genres: House; electro; EDM
- Length: 39:15
- Labels: Warner Music Australia (Australia); Ninja Tune / Foreign Family Collective (International)
- Producers: Harrison Mills; Clayton Knight; Thomas Stell

Odesza chronology
A Moment Apart (2017)	Bronson (2020)	The Last Goodbye (2022)

Golden Features chronology
Raka (2019)	Bronson (2020)	Sisyphus (2023)

Singles from Bronson
- 1. "Heart Attack" Released: 28 April 2020; 2. "Vaults" Released: 28 April 2020; 3. "Dawn" Released: 30 June 2020; 4. "Keep Moving" Released: 21 July 2020

Bronson (stylised in all caps) is the debut studio album by Bronson, the collaborative project of American DJs Odesza and Australian producer Golden Features. It was released on 7 August 2020, delayed from an initial 17 July release.

The album debuted and peaked at number 22 on the ARIA Albums Chart in Australia on 17 August 2020 and at number 5 on the US Top Dance/Electronic Albums Chart on 22 August 2020.

== Background ==
The album follows Golden Features' 2019 collaborative EP Raka with The Presets and Odesza's Grammy nominated 2017 album A Moment Apart. Golden Features previously remixed Odesza's song "Falls" in October 2018.

Odesza members Harrison Mills and Clayton Knight bonded with Thomas Stell over a mutual admiration of each other's music, sending demos to one another over Dropbox. After multiple studio sessions over FaceTime, they eventually met up in order to record together, which led to the creation of the album.

== Release and promotion ==
The album was announced on 27 April via Twitter, with Odesza posting on their account:

"Just finished an entire album with Golden Features."

Thomas Stell additionally posted:

"Let me introduce you to BRONSON. A full album from myself and my brothers ODESZA coming soon."

The album was originally scheduled to release on 17 July 2020, but was delayed to 7 August.

=== Singles ===
Four singles were released from the album: "Heart Attack" (featuring lau.ra) and "Vaults" on 28 April 2020, "Dawn" (featuring Totally Enormous Extinct Dinosaurs) on 30 June 2020, and "Keep Moving" on 21 July 2020.

== Recording ==
Bronson was produced by Harrison Mills, Clayton Knight, and Thomas Stell.

Recording on the album began in 2018, in Berry, New South Wales, and was finalised in 2020.

== Composition ==
Bronson is primarily a house, electro, and EDM album.

=== Themes ===
In a statement regarding the album's themes, Bronson stated the record is about:

"[Their] respective needs to challenge personal struggles, both internal and external. Moreover, the trio recognized that their own battles were merely microcosms of the surrounding world. The hope was to craft a body of work that was reflective of that duality of lightness and darkness inherent to the human condition.

== Artwork ==
The cover artwork depicts a man holding his head in his hands, with the letters "Bro" and "Nson" written in capital letters on his left and right hands, respectively. The album title is displayed in white text at the bottom of the image.

== Critical reception ==
Ross Goldenberg of Dancing Astronaut stated: "With all tracks seamlessly transitioning into one another, Bronson maintains a balanced pool of lighter additions." He additionally described the album as "a promising first chapter".

Sophie Bress, also of Dancing Astronaut, called the album "a maze of sound, brimming with contradictions. It is expected but not predictable, surprising but not shocking, sonically diverse but not disjointed." Bress also noted the album "brings together their distinct styles", describing the result as a "multitudinous and emotive musical collection that defies classification".

Allie Gregory of Exclaim! praised the album as "a wholesome, heartfelt approach to electronic dance music that appeals to emotion before aesthetics." Gregory also stated she "hope[s] to hear from [them] again in the future."

Ryan Middleton of Magnetic Magazine described the album as "tough and gritty" and praised its "intricate melodies". Middleton also favourably compared the track "Tense" to Gesaffelstein's production work.

== Commercial performance ==
In Australia, Bronson debuted and peaked at number 22 on the ARIA Albums Chart for the chart dated 17 August 2020, before falling into the lower fifty the following week.

In the United States, the album debuted and peaked at number 5 on Billboard's Top Dance/Electronic Albums Chart, before exiting the chart a week later.

== Track listing ==
All tracks were written by all members of Bronson, with the exception of featured artists. All tracks produced by Bronson.

Bronson track listing
No.	Title	Length
1.	"Foundation"	3:04
2.	"Heart Attack" (featuring lau.ra)	3:29
3.	"Bline"	4:24
4.	"Know Me" (featuring Gallant)	3:00
5.	"Vaults"	4:04
6.	"Tense"	3:19
7.	"Call Out"	2:59
8.	"Contact"	3:27
9.	"Keep Moving"	4:06
10.	"Dawn" (featuring Totally Enormous Extinct Dinosaurs)	7:23
Total length:		39:15

Japanese edition bonus tracks
No.	Title	Length
11.	"Know Me" (instrumental)
12.	"Heart Attack" (instrumental)

Notes

- All track titles are stylised in all caps.
- "Blackout" was the original title for "Keep Moving", but was changed in the final tracklist.

== Personnel ==
Adapted from the album's liner notes.

Bronson

- Harrison Mills – producer (1–12)
- Clayton Knight – producer (1–12)
- Thomas Stell – producer (1–12)

Other musicians

- Laura Bettinson – vocals (2)
- Christopher Joseph Gallant III – vocals (4)
- Orlando Tobias Edward Higginbottom – vocals (10)

== Charts ==
Chart performance for Bronson
Chart (2020)	Peak position
Australian Albums (ARIA)	22
US Top Dance/Electronic Albums (Billboard)	5

=== Year-end charts ===
Year-end chart performance for Bronson
Chart (2020)	Position
Australian Dance Albums (ARIA)	50

== Release history ==
Release formats for Bronson
Region	Release date	Formats	Label	Refs.
Australia	7 August 2020	LP; digital download; streaming	Warner Music Australia	
Various	7 August 2020	CD; LP; digital download; streaming	Ninja Tune / Foreign Family Collective	
