= Steve Kane =

American baseball umpire (1869-1915)

- Born: Stephen J. Kane; 1869
- Died: October 30, 1915 (aged 45–46); Kentucky, U.S.
- Occupation: professional baseball umpire

Stephen J. Kane (1869 – October 30, 1915), nicknamed "Stevedore", was an American professional baseball umpire. He umpired for two seasons in the National League (NL) and spent part of a season umpiring in the Federal League (FL).

== Biography ==
Kane umpired in the American Association between 1905 and 1908. During the 1906 season, manager Mike Kelley accused Kane and umpire Brick Owens of giving away his team's signals during a June series. Kane, Owens and Kelley were briefly suspended until Kelley was pressed for evidence and he retracted his accusations.

Once described as a "little red-faced Irishman", Kane was an NL umpire in 1909 and 1910. He was dismissed from the NL before the 1911 season. He spent part of the 1911 season umpiring in the Northwestern League; he sustained an injury during the season and returned home, but he umpired in the Blue Grass League late that year. He signed with the American Association again in 1912. While umpiring in the Interstate League in 1913, Kane left in the middle of a May game after an argument over a balk call that he made.

Kane started 1914 with the Federal League, but he was released from the league in June. He umpired in the Ohio State League in 1915. He died that year in a Louisville hotel room of an apparent heart attack.

== See also ==
- List of Major League Baseball umpires (disambiguation)
