= Improved Sound Limited =

- Origin: Nuremberg, Bavaria, Germany
- Genres: Krautrock
- Members: Johnny Fickert; Axel Linstädt; Uli Ruppert; Rolf Gröschner; Bernd Linstädt
- Website: www.improved-sound-limited.de

Improved Sound Limited is a German krautrock group formed in 1961. The band started at Willstätter School in Nuremberg with the name "Pyjamas Skiffle Group". From 1964 to 1966, they changed their name to "Blizzards" and backed pop singer Roy Black at 33 shows. The name "Improved Sound Limited" appears at 1966 and remains, except for a brief period during 1976 when CBS advised them to change to the name "Condor".

The band specialized in making soundtracks for German television series and for the films from the directors Michael Verhoeven and Wim Wenders. With respect to Wenders, their songs feature prominently in the 1976 road movie Kings of the Road. Properly speaking, Bernd Linstädt wasn't a musician of the group, but he wrote all the lyrics and had a real impact on the band. Their song "Oedipus" was sampled by Odesza in the song "All My Life" from their 2022 album "The Last Goodbye".

== Band members ==
- Johnny Fickert (vocals, alto sax, flute, percussion), deceased in 2009
- Axel Linstädt (composition, guitars, keyboards, vocals)
- Uli Ruppert (bass), deceased in 2017
- Rolf Gröschner (drums)
- Bernd Linstädt (lyrics)

== Discography ==
=== Singles ===
- 1966: It Is You / We Are Alone (Polydor)
- 1969: Sing Your Song / Marvin Is Dead (Polydor)
- 1969: Hoppe hoppe Reiter / I'm Exhausted (Cornet)
- 1970: Oedipus / Where Will The Salmon Spawn (United Artists)
- 1976: Soundtrack of Kings of the Road (Filmverlag der Autoren)

=== LPs ===
- 1969: Engelchen macht weiter – hoppe, hoppe Reiter (Cornet) – Soundtrack of Up the Establishment
- 1971: Improved Sound Limited (Liberty)
- 1973: Catch A Singing Bird On The Road (CBS)
- 1976: Rathbone Hotel (CBS)

=== CDs ===
- 2001: Improved Sound Limited (Long Hair Music)
- 2001: Catch A Singing Bird On The Road (Long Hair Music)
- 2002: Rathbone Hotel (Long Hair Music)
- 2002: Road Trax (Long Hair Music)
- 2003: The Final Foreword (Long Hair Music)
- 2004: Box de 6 CDs: The Ultimate Collection (Long Hair Music)
