= Kelsey Bulkin =

American singer-songwriter (born 1985)

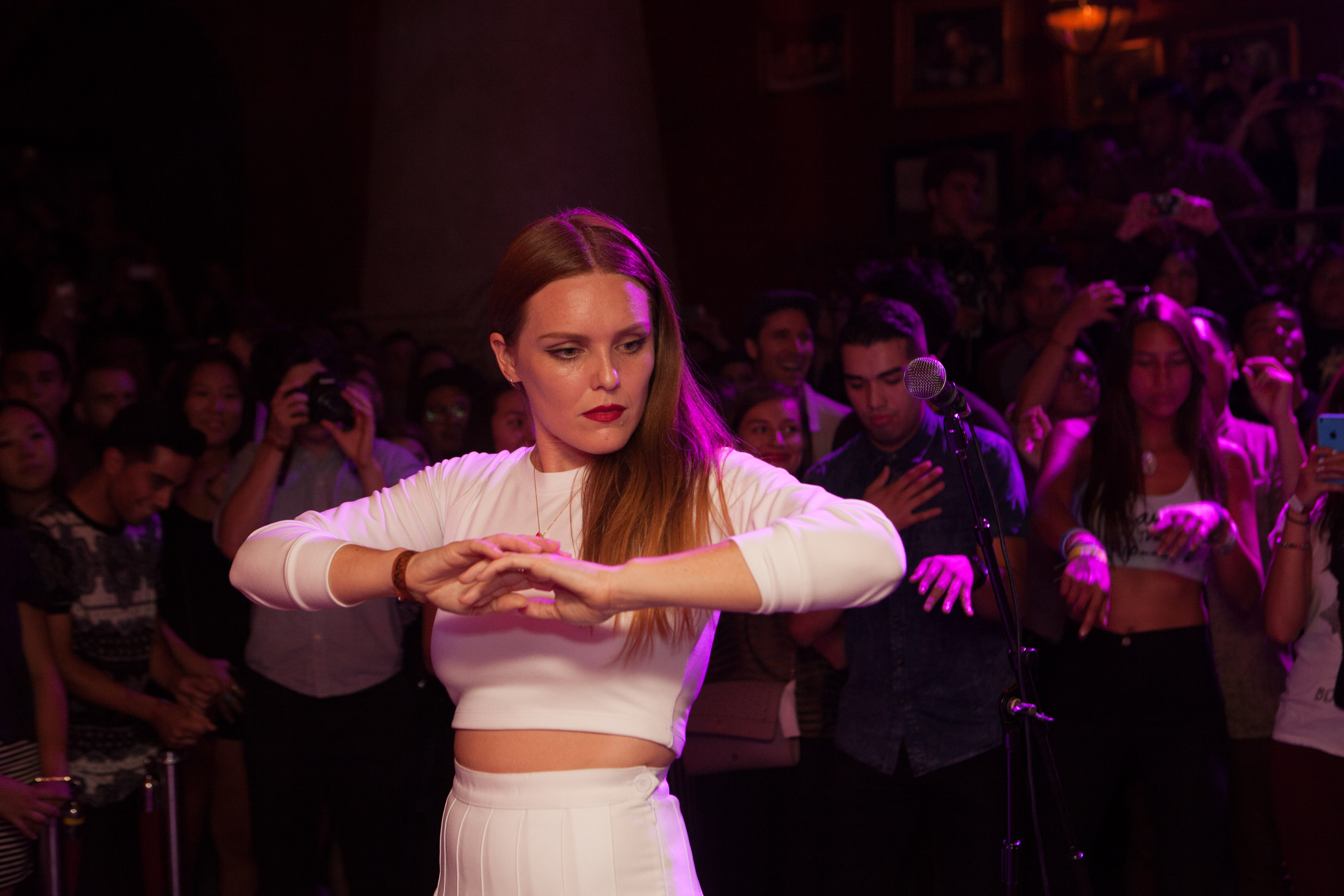
- Bulkin in 2014

Background information
- Born: Kelsey Bahiyyih Bulkin; March 25, 1985 (age 40); Encinitas, California, U.S.
- Genres: Indie pop
- Occupation: Singer-songwriter
- Instrument: Vocals
- Years active: 2010–present
- Website: Kelseybulkin.com

Kelsey Bahiyyih Bulkin (born March 25, 1985) is an American singer-songwriter, best known as singer and songwriter of the duo Made in Heights, alongside producer Sabzi.

== Early life ==
Bulkin was born on March 25, 1985, in Encinitas, California. She is the niece of producer and artist Mark Spiro.

== Career ==
From 2010 to 2015, Made in Heights released two albums, headlined a U.S. tour, performed at major music festivals such as Outside Lands, Electric Forest Festival, and Lightning in a Bottle, and saw critical praise from outlets such as The Fader, Vice, Complex, Consequence of Sound, KCRW, and The Atlantic.

== Personal life ==
Kelsey is based in Los Angeles, and was formerly based in Oakland, California.

== Discography ==
- Made in Heights – Made in Heights (2012)
- Made in Heights – Without My Enemy What Would I Do (2015)
- Kelsey Bulkin – Leucadia EP (2019)

== Songwriting ==
- Made in Heights – Made in Heights
- Made in Heights – Without My Enemy What Would I Do
- Co-wrote and featured on producer Rahki's "Perfect Words" for artist Thurz
- Co-wrote and featured on Kero One's "Princess Diamond," which was also remixed by Starro
