= Shy Girls =

American singer-songwriter

Background information
- Born: Daniel John Vidmar; State College, Pennsylvania
- Genres: Alternative R&B
- Occupation(s): Singer-songwriter, record producer
- Years active: 2012–present
- Labels: Keep Cool Records, Hit City U.S.A.
- Website: shygirlsmusic.com

Daniel John Vidmar, best known by his stage name Shy Girls, is an American alternative R&B singer-songwriter and producer currently based in Los Angeles, CA. His debut EP, Timeshare, was released in 2013 to critical acclaim on the Internet. Throughout 2014, Shy Girls was hand-picked as US tour opener for Haim, Maxwell, and Little Dragon and performed at festivals like Lollapalooza and MusicfestNW. Vidmar also was featured on "All We Need" by Odesza for their 2014 album, In Return. In 2015, he released a 13-track mixtape titled 4WZ which featured guest appearances by Tei Shi, Rome Fortune and Antwon. In 2019, Vidmar released his major-label debut album, Salt, on RCA Records.

As a producer and songwriter, Vidmar has worked with artists such as Jhené Aiko, Young Thug, Cashmere Cat, Kito, Cyril Hahn, and Yoke Lore. Vidmar composed the music for the Netflix Original documentary, The Speed Cubers, in 2020.

== Life and career ==
Vidmar was born in State College, Pennsylvania. He attended Pennsylvania State University where he majored in psychology and played classic rock music in a dive-bar before moving to Portland upon graduation.

=== Timeshare EP ===
In 2013, Vidmar released his first single, "Under Attack", on SoundCloud. Pitchfork called the track "thrilling", "a devastating slow jam that knows just how long to withhold its pleasures" and Noisey named the track the 5th best song of 2013. Subsequently, his debut EP Timeshare was released in October of that year, garnering positive attention from many music publications and blogs.

Following the success of Timeshare, Shy Girls toured as the opening act for Haim on their 2014 US tour. Later that year he also went on to tour as the opening act for neo soul godfather Maxwell and Swedish electronic act Little Dragon.

=== 4WZ Mixtape ===
On February 4, 2015, Vidmar released a free 13-track mixtape, 4WZ, named after a radio station from his hometown. The mixtape featured appearances from Tei Shi, Rome Fortune and Antwon.

=== Salt and Bird on the Wing ===
Vidmar's debut full-length album, Salt, was released on January 20, 2017. After a two year hiatus, he released the follow-up album, Bird on the Wing, in 2019 via the RCA imprint, Keep Cool.

== Discography ==
=== Albums ===
- Salt (2017)
- Bird on the Wing (2019)

=== EPs ===
- Timeshare (2013)

=== Mixtapes ===
- 4WZ (2015)

=== Guest appearances ===
- 2013: "Perfect Form" (Cyril Hahn ft. Shy Girls)
- 2014: "All We Need" (Odesza ft. Shy Girls)
- 2017: "The Future Comes Before" (Prequell ft. Shy Girls)
- 2018: "Blue" (Kito ft. Shy Girls)

== Filmography ==
=== Composer ===
- The Speed Cubers
