= Odesza =

American electronic music duo

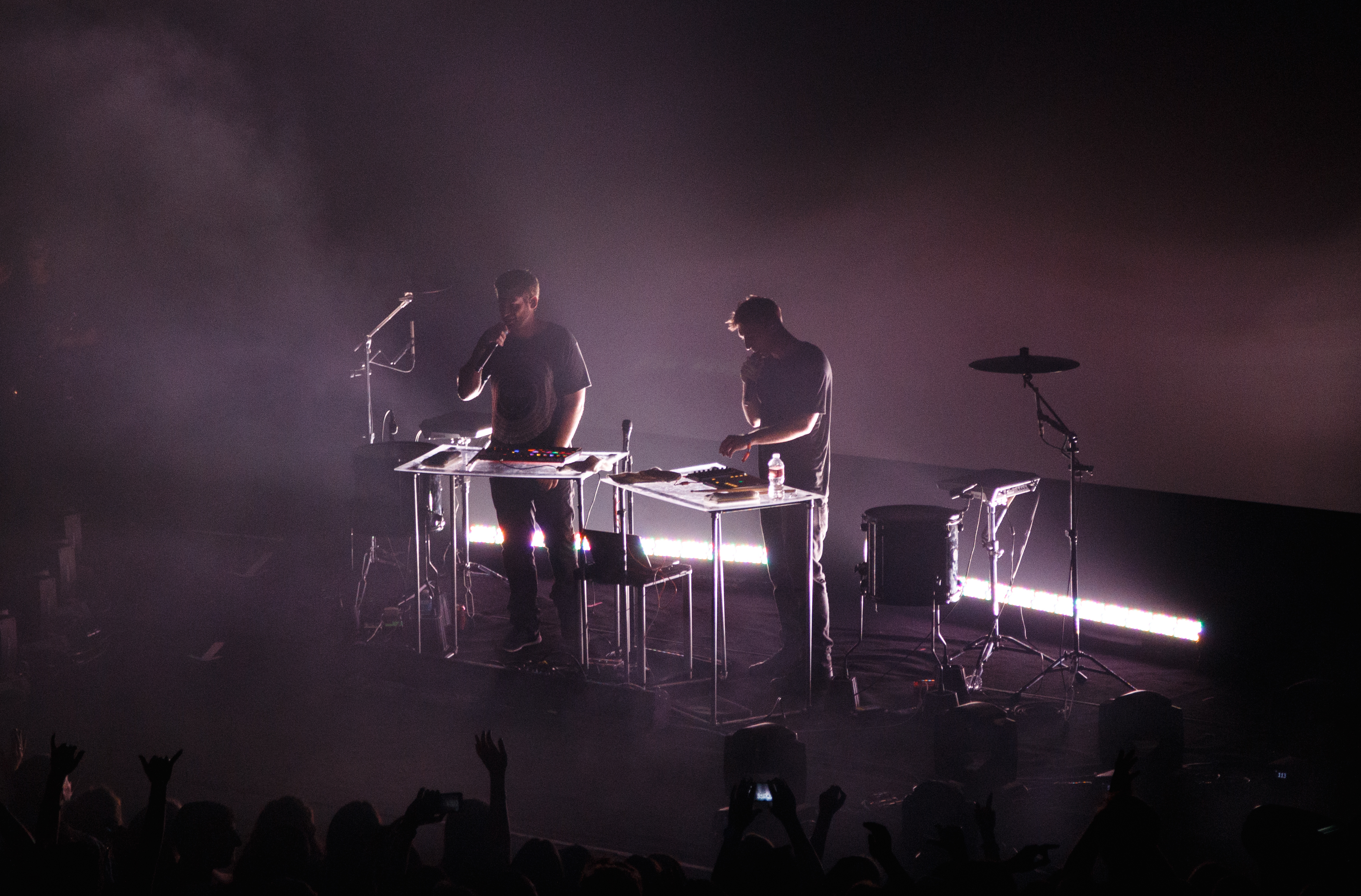
- Odesza performing at the Arlington Theater in April 2015

Background information
- Origin: Bellingham, Washington, United States
- Genres: Indietronica; electropop; chillwave; future bass; trap
- Years active: 2012–present
- Labels: Ninja Tune; Counter; Foreign Family Collective
- Members: Harrison Mills (a.k.a. Catacombkid); Clayton Knight (a.k.a. BeachesBeaches)
- Website: www.odesza.com

Odesza (/oʊˈdɛzə/; stylized in all caps) is an American electronic music duo originating from Bellingham, Washington. It consists of Harrison Mills and Clayton Knight, known individually as Catacombkid and BeachesBeaches. They formed in 2012, shortly before Mills and Knight graduated from Western Washington University.

Their debut album, Summer's Gone, was released later in 2012 to acclaim in the underground electronic music community. After their debut extended play (EP), My Friends Never Die, in 2013, they released their second album, In Return, on September 9, 2014. It was the duo's debut release on Ninja Tune and its imprint, Counter Records. In 2016, "Say My Name" (RAC mix) gained the duo their first Grammy nomination (Best Remixed Recording, Non-Classical) at the 58th Annual Grammy Awards. A Moment Apart, their third studio album, was released on September 8, 2017. It reached number three on the Billboard 200, while topping the Top Electronic/Dance Albums Chart. It was nominated for Best Dance/Electronic Album, with "Line of Sight" also nominated for Best Dance Recording, at the 60th Annual Grammy Awards in 2018. ODESZA released their fourth studio album, The Last Goodbye, on July 22, 2022 through Ninja Tune. The album was nominated for Best Dance/Electronic Album for the 65th Grammy Awards.

The duo was also nominated in 2017 for Producer of the Year at the Electronic Music Awards. They have founded and operated their own record label, Foreign Family Collective, which distributes songs as well as visual art from artists. Furthermore, Billboard named Odesza as number 10 on their 2018 ranking of dance musicians, the Billboard Dance 100.

== History ==
=== Early career ===
Harrison Mills and Clayton Knight met during their freshman year at Western Washington University. The two did not share the same educational interests as Knight studied physics and mathematics while Mills studied graphic design. They did not begin collaborating musically until their senior year in 2012 after befriending their early influence into music, DJ Maul-IE. As a child, Knight was classically trained in piano and later learned guitar.

==== Name ====
The band's name is taken from the name of Mills' uncle's sunken vessel, which was named after the Ukrainian city of Odesa. Only his uncle and one other crew mate survived. Since the spelling "Odessa" was already being used by a Scottish synth band, they instead chose to use a form of the Hungarian spelling, replacing the "ss" with "sz". The correct spelling in Hungarian is “Odessza”.

Individually Mills is known as Catacombkid, and Knight is known as BeachesBeaches. In reference to how Mills got his nickname, he says, "I got into Aesop Rock and he has a song called 'Catacomb Kids.' I thought it sounded cool." On the other hand, regarding the story behind Knight's nickname, Knight says, "Honestly I was high in my bedroom making music one day…"

=== 2012–2014: Summer's Gone, My Friends Never Die EP and In Return ===
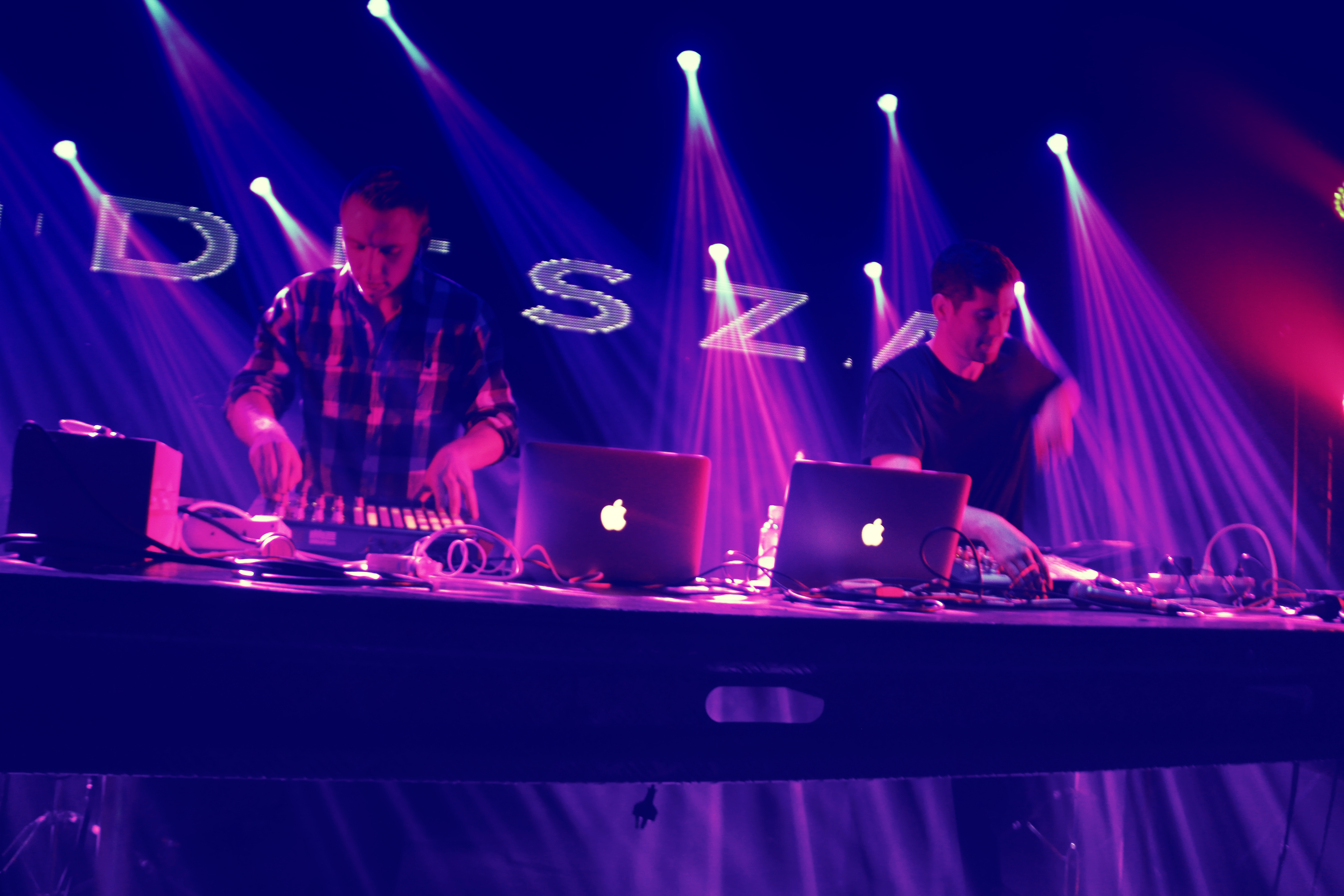
Odesza performing in 2014

The duo quickly released their debut LP, Summer's Gone, on September 5, 2012. On November 9, 2012, Odesza performed their first show, opening for Teen Daze and Beat Connection in Bellingham, WA. Odesza was booked to open for Pretty Lights on his Analog Future Tour in the fall of 2013. Their first headline tour kicked off on March 12, 2014. On October 17, 2014, Odesza's In Return North American tour sold out 28 shows. Thirty-one Odesza tracks have reached the top on Hype Machine, including "How Did I Get Here", "Memories That You Call", "Lights", "All We Need" (Autograf Remix), among others. Their first festival performance at Sasquatch! Music Festival in George, Washington was followed by slots at over 20 festivals, including Coachella, SXSW, Hangout Festival, Lightning in a Bottle, Governor's Ball Music Festival, Bonnaroo Music Festival, Firefly Music Festival, Free Press Summer Fest, and Lollapalooza.

=== 2015–2016: Foreign Family Collective and touring ===
In March 2015, Odesza launched Foreign Family Collective, an outlet for musicians and visual artists alike. Their goal is to help upcoming artists gain more exposure by releasing one-off singles. As of December 2017, there have been 29 released singles.

On November 11, 2015, Odesza launched their official mobile app on iOS and Android.

Following their sold out In Return Fall Tour, Odesza released the video for "It's Only" (featuring Zyra) on January 18, 2016.

=== 2017: A Moment Apart and 2017 A Moment Apart Tour ===
On April 25, 2017, Odesza released two digital singles, "Late Night" and "Line of Sight" featuring WYNNE and Mansionair. On June 12, 2017, the duo released two additional digital singles ("Meridian" and "Corners of the Earth" featuring RY X), and announced a September 8 release date for their third studio album, A Moment Apart. An additional single ("Higher Ground" featuring Naomi Wild) was released after having been leaked online. Following the release of the album, a world tour was announced with dates across Australia, Europe, and North America. The 2017 A Moment Apart Tour was met with great response, selling out large venues such as Staples Center and Barclays Center.

Tracks from A Moment Apart have been widely used across the media; "Across the Room" (featuring Leon Bridges) was used on Grey's Anatomy S14E05, "Danger Zone"; "A Moment Apart" in GoPro Hero 6's commercial and as a song on a radio station in Forza Horizon 4 as well as for the game's main theme. "Late Night" was used for Acura. "La Ciudad" was used as one of the background tracks to EA Sports’ FIFA 18.

On October 26, 2017, Odesza made their debut television appearance on Jimmy Kimmel Live! performing "Line of Sight" featuring WYNNE and "Higher Ground" featuring Naomi Wild. On November 28, 2017, A Moment Apart was nominated for Best Dance/Electronic Album at the 60th Annual Grammy Awards; their single "Line of Sight" featuring WYNNE & Mansionair was nominated for Best Dance Recording.

=== 2018–2019: 2018 A Moment Apart Tour, "Loyal" and Sundara ===
On December 4, 2017, Odesza announced the continuation of their A Moment Apart Tour, kicking off February 2, 2018 at Laneway Festival. On January 2, 2018, Odesza announced they would be joining the Coachella 2018 lineup, playing on Sunday night before Eminem. On January 9, "Corners of the Earth" was chosen to be used as the Winter Olympics Anthem.

On September 12, 2018, Odesza released their 11th single, “Loyal”. “Loyal” is also on A Moment Apart (Deluxe Edition). It peaked at 19th on the US dance chart. “Loyal” gained more popularity when it was featured on Apple’s “Apple's Big News in 108 seconds” and "iPhone Xr" advertisements, these adverts also premiered on the same date as Loyal suggesting that Apple and ODESZA had an agreement to release the two at the same time. Additionally, "Loyal" was used in an advertisement for the Nissan Juke.

“Loyal” was also used in the release trailer for the Fortune Island expansion of the 2018 video game Forza Horizon 4.

On October 16, 2018, Foreign Family Collective announced its first Odesza-curated festival, Sundara, held at the all-inclusive Barceló Resort in Riviera Maya, Mexico. The four-day festival ran from March 13–16, and featured major acts like RL Grime, Rüfüs du Sol, Alison Wonderland, Jai Wolf, and many more.

=== 2020: Bronson ===
On April 26, 2020, Odesza announced on their social media that they had completed a collaborative album with Australian producer Golden Features. On April 27, it was confirmed that both the project and the album would be titled Bronson, and that it would be released on July 17, 2020, with the first two tracks "Heart Attack" and "Vaults" available the following day.

On June 30, 2020, the third track "Dawn" was released, with the duo announcing that their album would be pushed back to August 7, 2020.

=== 2022: The Last Goodbye ===
On February 2, 2022, Odesza released an Instagram clip hinting at further music. Their website was also updated to include a phone number and email entry form which when filled out, had the message "Welcome to The Last Goodbye". The cryptic nature of the clip and message lead to speculation that the group may have been breaking up, which was later quelled by Mills and Knight.

Odesza released their first new music in over four years with the single "The Last Goodbye" on February 8, 2022, which samples the vocals from Bettye LaVette's 1965 hit song "Let Me Down Easy".

In March 2022, Odesza announced that their fourth studio album was also called The Last Goodbye, and would be released on July 22, 2022. In that same month, they announced a 27-date The Last Goodbye Tour, featuring special guests San Holo, Elderbrook, Ben Böhmer, Ford., Gilligan Moss, and Nasaya. On June 8, 2022, Odesza released their fifth single, "Wide Awake", off of The Last Goodbye. The album was nominated for Best Dance/Electronic Album for the 65th Grammy Awards.

In April 2023, a Deluxe Edition of The Last Goodbye was released, adding the singles "Hopeful" and "Two Be Yours", as well as VIP remixes of "All We Need" and "Sun Models", which had previously only been performed live. In May 2023, the duo announced a 1-night-only screening of The Last Goodbye: Cinematic Experience, a concert film that played in cinemas worldwide on July 7, 2023 and was released for physical and digital purchase on May 24, 2024.

Odesza's The Last Goodbye Tour in support of the album began in June 2022, totaling over 40 shows across North America, in addition to appearances at music festivals like Bonnaroo, Electric Forest, Lollapalooza and Life Is Beautiful. In January 2024, the duo announced a "Finale" slate of performances for the album, scheduled for Summer 2024 in California, New York, Colorado and Washington.

On May 31, 2024, Odesza released The Last Goodbye Tour Live, a 27-track album of live recordings from various shows across the tour for their album The Last Goodbye. It is Odesza's first live album and features several mash-ups and exclusive remixes that previously could only have been heard at shows on The Last Goodbye tour.

=== 2023: Flaws In Our Design and Rare.wavs ===
On June 25, 2023, Odesza announced that they had completed a new album, which they described as a "psychedelic indie-dance EP". On July 21, 2023, Odesza released the album Flaws in Our Design in collaboration album with Yellow House, a South-Africa-based singer/songwriter.

On September 13, 2023, Odesza released a new track "In The Rain", included in the compilation album Rare.wavs (Vol. 2), alongside singles from other artists on the Foreign Family Collective label, founded by Mills and Knight.

=== 2025: Music To Refine To: A Remix Companion To 'Severance’ ===
In January 2025 Odesza was commissioned to remix Theodore Shapiro's score for the Apple TV+ series Severance. Mills and Knight created a 23-minute mix of the score that was looped to form eight hours of music. They completed the project in a month. In an interview with Billboard, Mills described the remix as ”lulling you into this false sense of security that it’s all happy and then bringing these darker sounds that creep into it. It’s like beautiful melancholy. There’s sadness, but there’s also surface level joy throughout. We were trying to play with major chords, but then sneak in these weird, kind of dissonant sounds that creep in.” The single "Entering Lumon" was released on March 28, 2025; the full 7-song EP was released on April 5, 2025 on Fifth Season and Apple Video Programming under license for Foreign Family Collective.

== Awards and nominations ==
Year	Award	Category	Nominee/work	Result	Ref.
2016	Grammy Awards	Best Remixed Recording, Non-Classical	"Say My Name" (RAC Remix)	Nominated	
2016	Berlin Music Video Awards	Best Art Director	IT'S ONLY	Nominated	
2016	Berlin Music Video Awards	Best Performer	ALL WE NEED	Nominated	
2017	Electronic Music Awards	Producer of the Year	Odesza	Nominated	
2018	Grammy Awards	Best Dance/Electronic Recording	"Line of Sight"	Nominated	
2018	Grammy Awards	Best Dance/Electronic Album	A Moment Apart	Nominated	
2023	Grammy Awards	Best Dance/Electronic Album	The Last Goodbye	Nominated	
2023	Pop Awards	Song of the Year	"The Last Goodbye"	Nominated	

== Discography ==
=== Studio albums ===
List of studio albums, with selected chart positions shown
Title	Details	Peak chart positions		
Title	Details	US	US Dance	AUS
Summer's Gone	Released: September 5, 2012; Label: Self-released; Format: Digital download	—	—	—
In Return	Released: September 9, 2014; Label: Counter, Ninja Tune; Format: CD, LP, digital download	42	1	—
A Moment Apart	Released: September 8, 2017; Label: Counter, Ninja Tune, Foreign Family Collective; Format: CD, LP, digital download, streaming	3	1	13
The Last Goodbye	Released: July 22, 2022; Label: Counter, Ninja Tune, Foreign Family Collective; Format: CD, LP, digital download, streaming	11	2	22

=== Collaborative albums ===
List of collaborative albums, with release date and label shown
Title	Album details	Peak chart positions	
Title	Album details	US Dance	AUS
Bronson (with Golden Features as Bronson)	Released: August 7, 2020; Formats: Digital download, streaming; Label: Warner Music Australia (Australia), Ninja Tune / Foreign Family Collective (International)	5	23

=== Extended plays ===
List of extended plays, with release date and label shown
Title	Details
My Friends Never Die	Released: September 17, 2013; Label: Formats: Digital download, LP
Flaws In Our Design (with Yellow House)	Released: July 21, 2023; Label: Foreign Family Collective/Ninja Tune; Formats: Digital download, LP
Music To Refine To: A Remix Companion To 'Severance’	Released: April 4, 2025; Label: Fifth Season and Apple Video Programming under license for Foreign Family Collective; Formats: Digital download, LP

=== Remix EPs ===
List of remix EPs, with release date and label shown
Title	Details
My Friends Never Die (Remixes)	Released: November 12, 2013; Label: Formats: Digital download
Say My Name (Remixes)	Released: October 10, 2014; Label: Formats: Digital download
All We Need (Remixes)	Released: February 16, 2015; Label: Formats: Digital download
It's Only (Remixes)	Released: February 16, 2016; Label: Formats: Digital download, streaming
Higher Ground (Remixes)	Released: March 30, 2017; Label: Formats: Digital download, streaming
Across the Room Remixes	Released: June 21, 2018; Label: Formats: Digital download, streaming
Falls Remixes	Released: October 19, 2018; Label: Formats: Digital download, streaming
A Moment Apart (Remixes)	Released: February 15, 2019; Label: Formats: Digital download, streaming
The Last Goodbye Remixes Nº.1	Released: September 20, 2022; Label: Formats: Digital download, streaming

=== Singles ===
List of singles, with year released and album shown
Title	Year	Peak chart positions		Certifications	Album
Title	Year	US Alt.	US Dance	Certifications	Album
"Sun Models" (featuring Madelyn Grant)	2014	—	40	RIAA: Gold; ARIA: Gold	In Return
"Say My Name" (featuring Zyra)	2015	—	16	RIAA: Gold	In Return
"All We Need" (featuring Shy Girls)	2015	—	29		In Return
"Light" (featuring Little Dragon)	2015	—	—		In Return
"It's Only" (featuring Zyra)	2016	—	—		In Return
"Line of Sight" (featuring Wynne and Mansionair)	2017	23	37	ARIA: Gold	A Moment Apart (Note: "Loyal" is only included on the deluxe edition of A Moment Apart.)
"Late Night"	2017	—	31		A Moment Apart
"Meridian"	2017	—	31		A Moment Apart
"Corners of the Earth" (featuring RY X)	2017	—	—		A Moment Apart
"Higher Ground" (featuring Naomi Wild)	2017	—	25		A Moment Apart
"Across the Room" (featuring Leon Bridges)	2017	—	30		A Moment Apart
"Loyal"	2018	—	19		A Moment Apart
"Heart Attack" (with Golden Features as Bronson; ft. Lau.ra)	2020	—	17		Bronson
"Vaults" (with Golden Features as Bronson)	2020	—	—		Bronson
"Dawn" (with Golden Features as Bronson; ft. Totally Enormous Extinct Dinosaurs)	2020	—	—		Bronson
"Keep Moving" (with Golden Features as Bronson)	2020	—	—		Bronson
"The Last Goodbye" (featuring Bettye LaVette)	2022	—	10	RIAA: Gold	The Last Goodbye
"Better Now" (featuring Maro)	2022	33	19		The Last Goodbye
"Love Letter" (featuring The Knocks)	2022	—	21		The Last Goodbye
"Behind the Sun"	2022	—	28		The Last Goodbye
"Wide Awake" (featuring Charlie Houston)	2022	—	19		The Last Goodbye
"Light of Day" (featuring Ólafur Arnalds)	2022	—	33		The Last Goodbye
"Hopeful"	2023	—	20		Non-album singles
"To Be Yours" (featuring Claud)	2023	—	24		Non-album singles
"Heavier" (with Yellow House)	2023	—	29		Non-album singles
"Waiting Forever" (with Yellow House featuring Preston)	2023	—	26		Non-album singles
"In the Rain"	2023	—	37		Non-album singles
"—" denotes a recording that did not chart or was not released.

=== Other charted songs ===
List of other charted songs, with year released and album shown
Title	Year	Peak chart positions			Album
Title	Year	US AAA	US Dance	NZ Hot	Album
"Bloom"	2015	—	39	—	In Return
"Falls" (featuring Sasha Sloan)	2017	—	29	—	A Moment Apart
"A Moment Apart"	2017	—	32	—	A Moment Apart
"Boy"	2017	—	38	—	A Moment Apart
"This Version of You" (featuring Julianna Barwick)	2022	—	29	—	The Last Goodbye
"Forgive Me" (featuring Izzy Bizu)	2022	—	17	38	The Last Goodbye
"North Garden"	2022	—	38	—	The Last Goodbye
"All My Life"	2022	—	41	—	The Last Goodbye
"Equal" (featuring Låpsley)	2022	—	44	—	The Last Goodbye
"Healing Grid"	2022	—	48	—	The Last Goodbye
"I Can't Sleep"	2022	—	49	—	The Last Goodbye
"—" denotes a recording that did not chart or was not released.

=== Remixes ===
Year	Release details	Song
2012	Wild: Nomadic Firs; Released: October 23, 2012	"Cover Bombs" (Odesza Remix)
2013	The Palace Garden: Beat Connection; Released: April 23, 2013	"Saola" (Odesza Remix)
2013	Don't Talk To (EP): Rac; Released: September 30, 2013	"We Belong" featuring Katie Herzig (Odesza Remix)
2013	A Color Map of the Sun – Remixes: Pretty Lights; Released: December 10, 2013	"One Day They'll Know" (Odesza Remix)
2014	Divergent: Original Motion Picture Soundtrack: Pretty Lights; Released: March 3, 2014	"Lost and Found" (Odesza Remix)
2014	Kitty Hawk (Deluxe Edition): Ki:Theory; Released: April 8, 2014	"Open Wound" (Odesza Remix)
2014	Faded – The Remixes: Zhu; Released: June 29, 2014	"Faded" (Odesza Remix)
2014	"Waited 4 U": Slow Magic; Released: November 12, 2014	"Waited 4 U" (Odesza Remix)
2014	"Big Girls Cry": Sia; Released: December 5, 2014	"Big Girls Cry" (Odesza Remix)
2015	"Eve II": Emancipator; Released: July 7, 2015	"Eve II" (Odesza Remix)
2015	"Something About You": Hayden James; Released: July 27, 2015	"Something About You" (Odesza Remix)
2015	"Divinity": Porter Robinson; Released: September 21, 2015	"Divinity" featuring Amy Millan (Odesza Remix)
2018	"It's Only": Odesza, Zyra; Released: November 29, 2018	"It's Only" featuring Zyra (Odesza VIP Remix)
2018	"Memories That You Call": Odesza, Monsoonsiren; Released: November 30, 2018	"Memories That You Call" featuring Monsoonsiren (Odesza and Golden Features Remix)
2023	"Selfish Soul": Sudan Archives; Released: April 16, 2023	"Selfish Soul" (Odesza Remix)
