= Light Hit My Face Like a Straight Right =

Studio album by Mallrat
- Released: 14 February 2025
- Length: 34:11
- Label: Dew Process; Universal Australia
- Producer: Alice Ivy; APOB; Chrome Sparks; Kito; Len20; Lonelyspeck; Casey MQ; Buddy Ross; Gab Strum; Styalz Fuego

Mallrat chronology
| Butterfly Blue (2022) | Light Hit My Face Like a Straight Right (2025) |

Singles from Light Hit My Face Like a Straight Right
- 1. "Ray of Light" Released: 23 August 2024; 2. "Hocus Pocus" Released: 25 October 2024; 3. "Horses" Released: 6 December 2024; 4. "Pavement" Released: 17 January 2025; 5. "Hideaway" Released: 4 April 2025

Professional ratings
Review scores
| Source | Rating |
|---|---|
| DIY | 3.5/5 stars |
| Dork | 3/5 |
| Far Out | 2.5/5 stars |

Light Hit My Face Like a Straight Right is the second studio album by Australian singer-songwriter Mallrat. It was announced in December 2024 with Mallrat saying the album would "explore the intangible and mysterious allure of human connection, held together by curious investigations into light". The album was released on 14 February 2025.

The album will be supported by an Australian east coast tour, commencing in April 2025.

At the 2025 ARIA Music Awards, the album was nominated for Best Pop Release and Best Solo Artist.

At the 2025 J Awards, the album was nominated for Australian Album of the Year.

== Track listing ==
Light Hit My Face Like a Straight Right track listing
| No. | Title | Writer(s) | Producer(s) | Length |
|---|---|---|---|---|
| 1. | "My Darling, My Angel" | Grace Shaw; Jeremy Malvin | Chrome Sparks | 2:13 |
| 2. | "Pavement" | Shaw; Kaelyn Behr; Josiah Sherman; Tim Nelson | Styalz Fuego; Buddy Ross | 3:05 |
| 3. | "Something for Somebody" | Shaw; Behr; Glenn Hopper | Styalz Fuego; Len20 | 3:06 |
| 4. | "Virtue" | Shaw; Casey Manierka-Quaile; Mia Kristine Helander; Anna-Mari Kähärä | Casey MQ | 3:23 |
| 5. | "Defibrillator" | Shaw; Sione Teumohenga; Behr | Lonelyspeck; Styalz Fuego | 3:07 |
| 6. | "The Light Streams in and Hits My Face" | Shaw; Manierka-Quaile | Casey MQ | 0:58 |
| 7. | "Hocus Pocus" (with Kito) | Shaw; Behr; Maaike Kito Lebbing; Leroy Clampitt | Kito; Styalz Fuego | 3:13 |
| 8. | "Hideaway" | Shaw; Shaw; Behr; Gab Strum | Strum; Styalz Fuego | 2:57 |
| 9. | "Love Songs / Heart Strings" | Shaw; Manierka-Quaile | Casey MQ | 1:24 |
| 10. | "Ray of Light" | Shaw; Behr | Styalz Fuego | 3:49 |
| 11. | "The Worst Things I Would Ever Do" | Shaw; Behr; Aaron Paul O'Brien | Styalz Fuego; APOB | 3:24 |
| 12. | "Horses" | Shaw; Annika Schmarsel | Alice Ivy; Laura Sisk^{[v]} | 3:32 |

=== Note ===
- ^{^[v]} signifies an additional vocal producer.

== Personnel ==
Credits adapted from the album's liner notes.

- Mallrat – vocals
- Ruairi O'Flaherty – mastering
- Oli Jacobs – mixing
- Sammy-Jo Lang-Waite – album cover, film photos
- Greta Pitney – additional VHS stills
- Lilly Steele – photography assistance
- Meg Siejka – photography assistance
- Connor Dewhurst – design, layout
- Harley Jones – titles

== Charts ==
Chart performance for Light Hit My Face Like a Straight Right
| Chart (2025) | Peak position |
|---|---|
| Australian Albums (ARIA) | 35 |
