= In the Sky =

EP by Mallrat
- Released: 1 June 2018
- Length: 17:00
- Label: Dew Process
- Producer: Mallrat; Konstantin Kersting; Golden Vessel; Allday; Brandon Burton; Gabriel Strum

Mallrat chronology
| Uninvited (2016) | In the Sky (2018) | Driving Music (2019) |

Singles from In the Sky
- 1. "Better" Released: 13 October 2017; 2. "UFO" Released: 9 February 2018; 3. "Groceries" Released: 1 June 2018

In the Sky is the second extended play by Australian singer–songwriter Mallrat, released on 1 June 2018 through Dew Process.

== Reception ==
Professional ratings
Review scores
| Source | Rating |
|---|---|
| Forte Magazine | 4/5 stars |

Hannah Kenny from Forte Magazine described the sound on the EP as "dreamy, mixing harmonious melodies with serene vocals, the perfect contemporary lullaby music" and called the production "more refined".

Joanna Panagopoulos from Happy Mag said "In the Sky bottles up emotion and hands it to you in a dreamy, electro-pop vial. The music she makes is personal, nostalgic, but it's music for the world."

Tim Lambert from Stack Magazine called the EP an "evolution" from her debut single in 2015. Lambert said "...as a general rule you shouldn't allow Shaw's subtle, candied vocals to fool you into expecting matching up-beat lyrical content; most of it's fairly personal, with unrequited love and frustration the most repeated themes."

Chris White from When the Horn Blows said "Two years have shown what Mallrat is capable of and how much her talents have grown, bringing stronger themes to the EP, such as loss, loneliness and uncertainty, but always manages to keep the listener feeling good with its fantastic beats and wonderfully poppy harmonies."

== Track listing ==
| No. | Title | Writer(s) | Length |
|---|---|---|---|
| 1. | "Groceries" | Grace Shaw; Konstantin Kersting | 3:37 |
| 2. | "Texas" | Shaw; Jacques Emery; Max Byrne | 3:05 |
| 3. | "Better" | Shaw; Kersting | 3:14 |
| 4. | "UFO" (featuring Allday) | Shaw; Byrne; Tomas Gaynor | 3:07 |
| 5. | "Make Time" | Shaw; Brandon Burton; Gabriel Strum | 3:57 |

== Release history ==
| Region | Date | Format(s) | Label | Catalogue |
|---|---|---|---|---|
| Australia | 1 June 2018 | CD, Digital download, LP | Dew Process | DEW9001044 |
