= Nobody's Home =

Nobody's Home may refer to:

- "Nobody's Home" (Avril Lavigne song), a song by Avril Lavigne from her album Under My Skin
- "Nobody's Home" (Clint Black song), a song by Clint Black from his 1989 album Killin' Time
- "Nobody's Home" (Mallrat song), a 2019 song by Mallrat
- "Nobody's Home", a song by Kansas from their 1977 album Point of Know Return
- "Nobody's Home", a song by Deep Purple from their 1984 album Perfect Strangers
- "Nobody's Home", a song by Ulrich Schnauss from his 2001 album Far Away Trains Passing By
- "Nobody's Home", a short story from The Zanzibar Cat, a 1983 collection of short stories by Joanna Russ

== See also ==
- "Nobody Home", song by Pink Floyd
- Nobody Home (film)
