= Jesus at the Gay Bar =

Studio album by Cub Sport
- Released: 7 April 2023
- Length: 36:50
- Labels: Cub Sport; Believe
- Producers: Maxwell Byrne; Simon Lam; Tim Nelson; Styalz Fuego

Cub Sport chronology
Like Nirvana (2020)	Jesus at the Gay Bar (2023)

Singles from Jesus at the Gay Bar
- 1. "Always Got the Love" Released: 14 June 2022; 2. "Replay" Released: 11 November 2022; 3. "Keep Me Safe" Released: 19 January 2023; 4. "Songs About It" Released: 3 March 2023

Jesus at the Gay Bar is the fifth studio album by Australian pop group Cub Sport, released on 7 April 2023. The album was announced on 19 January 2023, alongside the album's third single "Keep Me Safe". The album title stems from Jay Hulme's poem published in his 2021 book The Backwater Sermons, that envisions Jesus Christ visiting a gay bar and being approached by a boy who "beg[s] to be healed", only to be told that "there is nothing in this heart of yours that ever needs to be healed".

Tim Nelson said "This is definitely our most dance-forward, party-centric album".

At the 2023 ARIA Music Awards, the album was nominated for Best Group, Best Independent Release and Best Cover Art.

At the 2024 Queensland Music Awards, the album won Album of the Year, whilst "Songs About It", won the Electronic award.

At the AIR Awards of 2024, the album was nominated for Independent Album of the Year and Best Independent Dance or Electronica Album or EP, while Adam Munnings was nominated for Independent Music Video of the Year for "Keep Me Safe".

== Promotion ==
=== Singles ===
"Always Got the Love" was released on 14 June 2022. Upon release, Nelson said, "I've always felt like the songs that people can cry to are important but I think being able to celebrate and move is equally important and that's kind of where I'm at right now. I wanna make music that makes people feel uplifted."

"Replay" was released on 11 November 2022 and was described by Alex Gallagher from NME as "a club-ready, house-influenced cut that marks the group's biggest venture yet into full-blown dance music."

The album's third single, "Keep Me Safe" is described as "a postcard to [Nelson's] former self", which he wrote "about a euphoric but complicated time" – when, before coming out as queer in 2017, he and keyboardist Sam Netterfield were forced to keep their relationship a secret.

"Songs About It" was released on 3 March 2023 as the album's fourth single.

== Critical reception ==
Professional ratings
Review scores
Source	Rating
NME	4/5 stars
Retropop	4/5 stars
Attitude Magazine	5/5 stars

Kristen S. Hé from NME said "Across 10 tracks, they craft a palette of crystalline guitars, melancholy chord progressions, and gentle, propulsive beats that perfectly complement Nelson's voice."

Retropop said "More than 10 years in the making, Cub Sport emerge with their finest body of work yet – an ode to celebrating one's past and looking boldly into the future, without the fear of past demons resurfacing – and finally set themselves up to take their sound global."

Charlotte Manning from Attitude Magazine called it "the band's best work yet" adding, "They manage a no-skips pop record full of reflection and an exciting hint towards the more anthemic sound they're clearly eyeing up for the future."

Bryget Chrisfield from Beat Magazine said "Jesus at the Gay Bar finds Cub Sport proudly celebrating queer joy – spiritual shackles, begone! – and more comfortable in their own skin than ever before."

== Track listing ==
Jesus at the Gay Bar track listing
No.	Title	Writer(s)	Producer(s)	Length
1.	"Always Got the Love"	Tim Nelson; Simon Lam	Lam; Nelson	3:27
2.	"Replay"	Nelson; Kaelyn Behr; Natalie Dunn	Nelson; Styalz Fuego	3:23
3.	"High for the Summer" (featuring Shamir)	Nelson; Behr; Shamir Bailey; Maxwell Byrne	Nelson; Byrne; Styalz Fuego	3:31
4.	"Keep Me Safe"	Nelson; Behr	Styalz Fuego	4:22
5.	"Zoom"	Nelson	Nelson	3:29
6.	"Songs About It"	Nelson; Behr; Dunn	Styalz Fuego	3:40
7.	"Beg U"	Nelson	Nelson	2:53
8.	"Hold"	Nelson; Behr; Dunn; Lam	Nelson; Styalz Fuego	3:05
9.	"Yaya" (featuring Mallrat)	Nelson; Zoe Davis; Behr; Grace Shaw	Nelson; Lam; Styalz Fuego	4:52
10.	"Magic in U"	Nelson; Behr	Nelson; Styalz Fuego	4:08
Total length:				36:50

== Charts ==
Chart performance for Jesus at the Gay Bar
Chart (2023)	Peak position
Australian Albums (ARIA)	1

== Release history ==
Release history and formats for Jesus at the Gay Bar
Region	Date	Format	Label	Catalogue	Ref.
Australia	7 April 2023	CD; LP; digital download; streaming; cassette	Cub Sport / Believe	CUB008CD / CUB008LP1	
