= Like Nirvana =

Studio album by Cub Sport
- Released: 24 July 2020
- Genre: Indie pop
- Length: 44:44
- Labels: Cub Sport; Believe

Cub Sport chronology
Cub Sport (2019)	Like Nirvana (2020)	Jesus at the Gay Bar (2023)

Singles from Like Nirvana
- 1. "Confessions" Released: 4 March 2020; 2. "Drive" Released: 27 March 2020; 3. "I Feel Like I Am Changin'" Released: 29 May 2020; 4. "Be Your Man" Released: 24 July 2020; 5. "Break Me Down" Released: 28 August 2020

Like Nirvana is the fourth studio album by Australian pop group Cub Sport. The album was announced on 4 March 2020, alongside the album's lead single "Confessions". The album was due for release 8 May 2020, but was delayed until 24 July 2020.

In an open letter to The Music, Cub Sport's Tim Nelson said Like Nirvana is an uplifting release that doesn't shy away from the shadows, "it embraces both the light and dark with warmth."

== Critical reception ==
Professional ratings
Review scores
Source	Rating
NME	5/5 stars
The Music AU	3.5/5 stars
Rolling Stone Australia	4.5/5 stars
Fortitude Magazine	10/10 stars
The Up Coming	4/5 stars

Annabel Ross of NME praised the album as "their most stunning LP yet" and stated: "stadium-sized glory might be painfully out of reach right now, for reasons beyond their control – but on 'Like Nirvana', Cub Sport make a compelling case for post-pandemic superstardom." Ross additionally stated "[the chorus of] "Confessions" channels Kanye West and Frank Ocean", and "is the first of many instances where vocal effects lend modern, raw tones to the record's ecclesiastical mood."

Guido Farnell of The Music AU said "This album captures some of Tim Nelson's most vulnerable moments. Elegantly understated and, for the most part, supremely chill, Cub Sport have stripped back the synth-pop hooks to create mellow clouds of sound intended to provide a little comfort and succour."

Poppy Reid of Rolling Stone Australia said "Cub Sport's defining aesthetic is their ability to confound categorisation. A horde of hopefuls will find solace within Like Nirvana, yet the hopeless will feel heard, and lovers of pop will obsess over its hooks and eighties reinvention." Reid said the highlights are "Confessions", "Be Your Man", "Grand Canyon" and "Break Me Down".

Eleanor Pettipher of Fortitude Magazine gave the album 10/10 saying "Like Nirvana feels like a giant leap away from the Cub Sport of This Is Our Vice (2016) and Bats (2017), not to say that they've lost what makes them them, only they've honed it further and carved out their own undoubted niche. Tim Nelson came out publicly as gay in 2017 and this album above all others has become the platform for Cub Sport to express their LGBTQ+ pride and spread the themes of self-love and acceptance." Pettipher added "If 2020 needs anything right now it's Like Nirvana so we can transcend out of the fog and into the rays of the sun."

Emily Harrison from The Up Coming said "Deep and abstract, Like Nirvana is a glimpse into Nelson's soul in a way that makes you feel both deeply empathetic and empowered." calling it "an album for this generation."

== Track listing ==
Like Nirvana track listing
No.	Title	Writer(s)	Length
1.	"Intro"		0:45
2.	"Confessions"	Tim Nelson	3:22
3.	"My Dear (Can I Tell You My Greatest Fears)"		2:12
4.	"I Feel Like I Am Changin'"	Nelson	3:09
5.	"Drive"	Nelson	3:24
6.	"Be Your Man"		3:30
7.	"Break Me Down" (with Mallrat)		6:58
8.	"Nirvana"		1:47
9.	"Saint"		3:43
10.	"18"		4:39
11.	"Best Friend"		3:44
12.	"Be Your Angel"		3:05
13.	"Grand Canyon"		3:26
Total length:			44:44

== Charts ==
Chart performance for Like Nirvana
Chart (2020)	Peak position
Australian Albums (ARIA)	2

== Release history ==
Sales chart performance for Like Nirvana
Region	Date	Format	Label	Catalogue	Ref.
Australia	24 July 2020	CD; LP; Digital download; streaming	Cub Sport / Believe	CUB007CD	
