= Wonder Drug (song) =

Single by Allday

from the album Starry Night Over the Phone
- Released: 9 November 2018
- Length: 3:15
- Label: OneTwo
- Songwriters: Tomas Gaynor; Max Byrne
- Producer: Simon Lam

Allday singles chronology
"UFO" (2018)	"Wonder Drug" (2018)	"Protection" (2019)

Music video
- "Wonder Drug" on YouTube

"Wonder Drug" is a song by Australian rapper Allday, released on 9 November 2018 as the lead single from the Allday's third studio album Starry Night Over the Phone. The single was certified gold in Australia in 2021.

The song was co-written with Australian producers Max Byrne (a.k.a. Golden Vessel) and Simon Lam (of Kllo). Allday told Triple J, "I met Max through Mallrat, She knows everybody, we became pals and made some songs together." Additionally Lam, "did all the executive production because he has a similar sensibility to me to what sounds cool."

== Certifications ==
Certifications for "Wonder Drug"
Region	Certification	Certified units/sales
Australia (ARIA)	Gold	35,000^{‡}
^{‡} Sales+streaming figures based on certification alone.
