= Drinking with My Smoking Friends =

Studio album by Allday
- Released: 28 May 2021
- Genres: Indie pop; indie rock; alternative hip-hop
- Length: 34:14
- Label: Believe
- Producer: Scott Horscoft (Note: Tracks 1, 3, and 6)

Allday chronology
Starry Night Over the Phone (2019)	Drinking with My Smoking Friends (2021)	The Necklace (2024)

Singles from Drinking with My Smoking Friends
- 1. "After All This Time" Released: 29 October 2020; 2. "Void" Released: 10 March 2021; 3. "Stolen Cars" Released: 30 April 2021

Drinking with My Smoking Friends is the fourth studio album by Australian rapper Allday, released on 28 May 2021 via Believe Music. The album was announced on 10 March 2021, alongside the release of second single "Void", and tour dates in August 2021.

Drinking with My Smoking Friends received critical acclaim following its release and peaked at number 13 on the ARIA Albums Chart.

== Background ==
In a press release, Allday said, "Drinking with My Smoking Friends is about escaping something and finding something new, whether that's a place, a relationship or something else."

== Critical reception ==
Professional ratings
Review scores
Source	Rating
Rolling Stone Australia	4.5/5 stars

Drinking with My Smoking Friends received critical acclaim.

Poppy Reid from Rolling Stone Australia said "In a world starved of human connection mid-pandemic, where even the simplest comforts are compromised, Drinking with My Smoking Friends reminds us to bathe in our own delicious weariness. It's Gaynor's most unguarded album yet, a landmark of breezy sophistication."

=== Mid-year lists ===
Drinking with My Smoking Friends on mid-year lists
Publication	List	Rank	Ref.
The Music	The Music's Top 25 Albums Of 2021 (So Far)	—N/a	

== Track listing ==
Drinking With My Smoking Friends track listing
No.	Title	Writer(s)	Producer(s)	Length
1.	"Void"	Tomas Gaynor; Simon Lam	Scott Horscroft	3:27
2.	"Cup of Tea in the Bath"			3:58
3.	"Stolen Cars"	Gaynor	Horscroft	3:17
4.	"Door"			2:49
5.	"The Paris End of Collins Street"			3:42
6.	"After All This Time"	Gaynor; Gabriel Strum	Horscroft	3:34
7.	"Fast Ride"			3:40
8.	"Bright"			3:41
9.	"Butterfly Sky"			3:14
10.	"Spin"			2:52
Total length:				34:14

== Charts ==
Chart performance for Drinking with My Smoking Friends
Chart (2021)	Peak position
Australian Albums (ARIA)	13

== Release history ==
Release history and formats for Drinking with My Smoking Friends
Region	Date	Format	Label	Catalogue	Ref.
Various	28 May 2021	Digital download; streaming	Believe	Not applicable	
Australia	28 May 2021	CD	Believe	ALLDAY004CD	
Australia	12 November 2021	LP	Believe	ALLDAY004V2	
