= Butterfly Blue =

Studio album by Mallrat
- Released: 13 May 2022
- Length: 40:25
- Labels: Dew Process, Universal Music Australia

Mallrat chronology
Driving Music (2019)	Butterfly Blue (2022)	Light Hit My Face Like a Straight Right (2025)

Singles from Butterfly Blue
- 1. "Rockstar" Released: 1 October 2020; 2. "Your Love" Released: 3 February 2022; 3. "Teeth" Released: 2 March 2022; 4. "Surprise Me" Released: 15 April 2022

Butterfly Blue is the debut studio album by Australian singer-songwriter Mallrat. It was announced on 2 March 2022, alongside single, "Teeth". Upon announcement, Mallrat said "I've always valued music that is interesting, beautiful, and unpretentious. Something timeless and not reactive. Butterfly Blue was made with that in mind. It's a demonstration of not pretending to be anyone else."

Butterfly Blue was released on 13 May 2022 and peaked at number 6 on the ARIA Charts.

Mallrat promoted the album with an Australian regional tour in November and December 2022. In February 2023, Mallrat announced the 2023 Butterfly Blue Australian shows, commencing on 12 May 2023, on the eve of the album's first birthday, performing in state capitals.

== Reception ==
Professional ratings
Review scores
Source	Rating
NME	4/5 stars
The AU Review	4/5 stars
Irish Times	3/5 stars
Pitchfork	6.8/10
DIY	4/5 stars

Retailer JB Hi-Fi said "Butterfly Blue features over a dozen clever and open-hearted tracks, it draws you in close and shows you the world through her wide, hopeful eyes."

Kristen S. Hé form NME said "Butterfly Blue is easily one of 2022's most charming Australian pop albums", calling "Rockstar" an "obvious highlight". Hé also said, "Much of the Australian alt-pop artist’s debut screams potential hit – these compelling compositions are still perfect for bedrooms, but could captivate festival stages, too."

Dylan Marshall from The AU Review said "Mallrat has a distinct sound that anyone who has listened to radio in the past six years would recognise. Often floating vocals, matched with clever pop hooks and at times minimalist beats, her songs branch across genres of country, folk and hip hop." Marshall said "Butterfly Blue may just be the pop record of 2022".

Andrea Cleary from Irish Times called the album "a spirited debut, unmoored by a singular genre". Cleary said the Azealia Banks track is "a slightly jarring moment, coming in on track three, but Shaw pulls us back from the whiplash – just about." Cleary concluded the review saying "Mallrat's charm comes best when she blends the simplicity of teenage dreams with a gentle touch on the console. A charming debut, Butterfly Blue is bedroom pop writ large.

Quinn Moreland from Pitchfork said "Across 11 songs, Mallrat explores desire and distance: Her songwriting is preoccupied with lovers who remain just out of reach and stars that momentarily align only to burn out" closing the review saying "Too frequently on Butterfly Blue, Mallrat gets lost in loose daydreams. When she latches onto particulars, she soars."

Charlotte Marston from DIY said "Butterfly Blue sees Mallrat emerge as somewhat of a transformed entity, one that is fully-grown and glimmering."

Teeth was featured in the end credits of Bishal Dutta's 2023 film It Lives Inside.

== Track listing ==
No.	Title	Writer(s)	Length
1.	"Wish on an Eyelash"	Grace Shaw; Gabriel Strum	0:58
2.	"To You"	Shaw; Kaelyn Behr	3:08
3.	"Surprise Me" (featuring Azealia Banks)	Shaw; Azealia Banks; Behr	2:51
4.	"Your Love"	Shaw; Behr; Gangsta Pat	3:22
5.	"Heart Guitar"	Shaw	4:15
6.	"Teeth"	Shaw; Annika Schmarsel	3:09
7.	"Rockstar"	Shaw; Thomas James Schleiter	3:29
8.	"I’m Not My Body, It's Mine"	Shaw; Leroy Clampitt	3:35
9.	"Obsessed"	Shaw; Konstantin Kersting	3:36
10.	"Arm's Length"	Shaw; Isaac Sakima	3:28
11.	"Butterfly Blue"	Shaw; Schmarsel	4:21
12.	"Fade into You"	David Roback; Hope Sandoval	4:13

== Charts ==
Chart (2022)	Peak position
Australian Albums (ARIA)	6
