= Starry Night Over the Phone =

Studio album by Allday
- Released: 12 July 2019
- Studio: NOTB in Studio City, CA
- Genre: Australian hip hop; alternative hip hop; indie pop
- Length: 37:24
- Label: OneTwo

Allday chronology
Speeding (2017)	Starry Night Over the Phone (2019)	Drinking with My Smoking Friends (2021)

Singles from Starry Night Over the Phone
- 1. "Wonder Drug" Released: 9 November 2018; 2. "Protection" Released: 22 March 2019; 3. "Lungs" Released: 15 May 2019; 4. "Restless" Released: 7 June 2019

Starry Night Over the Phone is the third studio album by Australian rap artist Allday. It was released on 12 July 2019. The album spawned four singles: "Wonder Drug", "Protection", "Lungs" and "Restless", featuring The Veronicas. The album's title is a reference to the Vincent van Gogh 1888 painting Starry Night Over the Rhône, with the album artwork's use of light also referencing the painting.

At the AIR Awards of 2020, the album was nominated for Best Independent Hip Hop Album Or EP. The album ultimately lost to Sampa the Great's album The Return.

== Reception ==
Professional ratings
Review scores
Source	Rating
The Music AU	3.5/5 stars

Anna Rose from The Music AU said the album "is a tender, star-studded offering, one that shows a maturity of soul and sound without washing out his signature hybrid of hip hop and pop." adding "[the] choice in collaborators brings a certain depth to his music." but concluded saying "...without the talents of musicians borrowed from other genres, this would be a pretty bland album." The album was recognised as one of the 20 Best Album Covers of 2019 by Billboard.

== Track listing ==
No.	Title	Writer(s)	Producer(s)	Length
1.	"Restless" (featuring The Veronicas)	Tomas Gaynor; Shama Joseph; Simon Lam	Shama Joseph; Simon Lam	3:12
2.	"Dont Wanna Push You Away Anymore" (featuring Japanese Wallpaper)	Gaynor	Japanese Wallpaper; Lam	3:18
3.	"Protection"	Gaynor; Lam; David von Mering; Grant Yarber	David von Mering; YOG$	3:33
4.	"Atmosphere"	Gaynor	Lam	3:29
5.	"See You When I See You" (featuring Lonelyspeck)	Gaynor	Lam; Lonelyspeck	3:41
6.	"Best Life"	Gaynor; Rogét Chahayed; Imad-Roy El-Amine; Blaise Railey; Ethan Snoreck	Rogét Chahayed; Lam; Imad Royal; Whethan	3:09
7.	"Lungs" (featuring Fossa Beats)	Gaynor; Daniel Lindsay	Fossa Beats	2:56
8.	"What Do You Think?"	Gaynor	Lam; Imad Royal	3:36
9.	"Rhythms"	Gaynor	Mike Derenzo; Lam	3:49
10.	"If Not Now, When?"	Gaynor	HAMLEY; Lam	3:26
11.	"Wonder Drug"	Gaynor; Max Byrne	Golden Vessel; Lam	3:15
Total length:				37:24

== Personnel ==
The following people contributed to Starry Night Over the Phone:

- Mario Borgatta – mixing, vocal production, engineer
- Simple Integrated Marketing – album artwork design

== Charts ==
Chart (2019)	Peak position
Australian Albums (ARIA)	7

== Release history ==
Region	Date	Format	Edition(s)	Label	Catalogue
Australia	12 July 2019	CD; digital download; LP	Standard	ONETWO	ONETWO008
