= UFO (Mallrat song) =

Single by Mallrat featuring Allday

from the album In the Sky
- Released: 9 February 2018
- Length: 3:07
- Label: Dew Process
- Songwriters: Grace Shaw, Tomas Gaynor, Max Byrne

Mallrat singles chronology
"Better" (2017)	"UFO" (2018)	"Groceries" (2018)

Allday singles chronology
"In Motion" (2017)	"Restless" (2018)	"Wonder Drug" (2018)

Music video
- "UFO" on YouTube

"UFO" is a song by Australian musician Mallrat featuring Australian rapper Allday. It was released on 9 February 2018 as the second single from Mallrat's second EP In the Sky.

Upon released of the EP, Mallrat said "'UFO' is about feeling like an alien. I don't know how to explain it. Like, I'm sure everybody feels like this sometimes, I don't feel as if I'm like any of these people. I love all of these people but there's just something that feels very different. I think I could be from another planet, maybe that's the only logical explanation."

The song was voted number 70 on the Triple J Hottest 100, 2018.

== Reception ==
Al Newstead from ABC called the song a "glorious pop sunbeam" calling the song "a different side to her sound, showing off her vocals with a more introspective lyric and a hazy slow-rap backing to match."

== Certifications ==
Region	Certification	Certified units/sales
Australia (ARIA)	Gold	35,000^{‡}
^{‡} Sales+streaming figures based on certification alone.
