= Always Got the Love =

Single by Cub Sport

from the album Jesus at the Gay Bar
- Released: 14 June 2022
- Length: 3:27
- Label: Cub Sport, Believe
- Songwriters: Tim Nelson, Simon Lam
- Producers: Tim Nelson, Simon Lam

Cub Sport singles chronology
"Mine" (2021)	"Always Got the Love" (2022)	"Replay" (2022)

"Always Got the Love" is a song by Australian alt-pop group Cub Sport. The song premiered on Triple J and was released on 14 June 2022. It is the lead single from the group’s fifth studio album, Jesus at the Gay Bar.

Upon release the group's lead singer Tim Nelson said "I've always felt like the songs that people can cry to are important but I think being able to celebrate and move is equally important and that's kind of where I'm at right now. I wanna make music that makes people feel uplifted." Additionally, Nelson told Triple J, "I've written a lot about the queer struggle and it was time to write something that felt like queer celebration. That's the inspiration for this song. It was just the song that I felt I wanted to hear through lockdown... Something that felt uplifting."

At the AIR Awards of 2023, the song was nominated for Independent Song of the Year and won Best Independent Dance, Electronica or Club Single.

== Background ==
Cub Sport's lead singer Tim Nelson said he wrote "Always Got the Love" with Simon Lam (of Kllo) in Melbourne on 23 March 2021, the day after his husband and the band's keyboardist Sam Netterfield's birthday. Nelson said the lyrics were inspired following a day at Hyam Beach that he and Netterfield went on in February 2021 saying "I'd been feeling pretty down around that time but this day at the beach I just felt so good. I remember being in the water thinking, 'I wanna try capture this energy in a song so I can hold onto it'. 'Always Got the Love' ended up becoming that song." Nelson and Lam also co-produced the track.

== Music video ==
The Jack Birtles-directed video depicts the band members at a warehouse party, with drummer Dan Puusaari DJ-ing. Nelson and guitarist Zoe Davis are dancers, while Netterfield arrives at the party on a motorcycle.

== Reception ==
Al Newstead from Triple J called it "an uplifting banger" saying, "[Tim] nailed the brief, wrapping his expressive voice around sumptuous house piano and a two-step beat that would perfectly soundtrack a beach rave in the middle of a European summer."

Leigh Andrew Hill from Out in Perth said "the track is powered by an effervescent two-step beat and frontman Tim Nelson's radiant falsetto" and called it "pure unadulterated joy".

== Track listings ==
Digital download/streaming

1. "Always Got the Love" (Tim Nelson, Simon Lam) – 3:27

Digital download/streaming

1. "Always Got the Love" (jamesjamesjames remix) (Nelson, James Ivey) – 4:04
2. "Always Got the Love" (Big Miz remix) (Nelson, Chris MacFarlane) – 3:18
3. "Always Got the Love" (Big Miz remix - extended) (Nelson, MacFarlane) – 4:03

Digital download/streaming

1. "Got the Love" (Tim Shiel and Cub Sport remix) – 3:57
