= Chasing (disambiguation) =

Chasing is a metalworking technique.

Chasing may also refer to:

- Chasing (2016 film), a Korean film
- Chasing (2020 film), an Indian film
- "Chasing" (song), a 2014 Gemma Hayes song
- "Chasin'", a 2017 song by Cub Sport from the album Bats
- "Chasin'", a 2012 song by Reks from Straight, No Chaser
- "Chasin'", a 2024 song by Paris Hilton and Meghan Trainor from Infinite Icon
