= Cub Sport =

Australian pop group

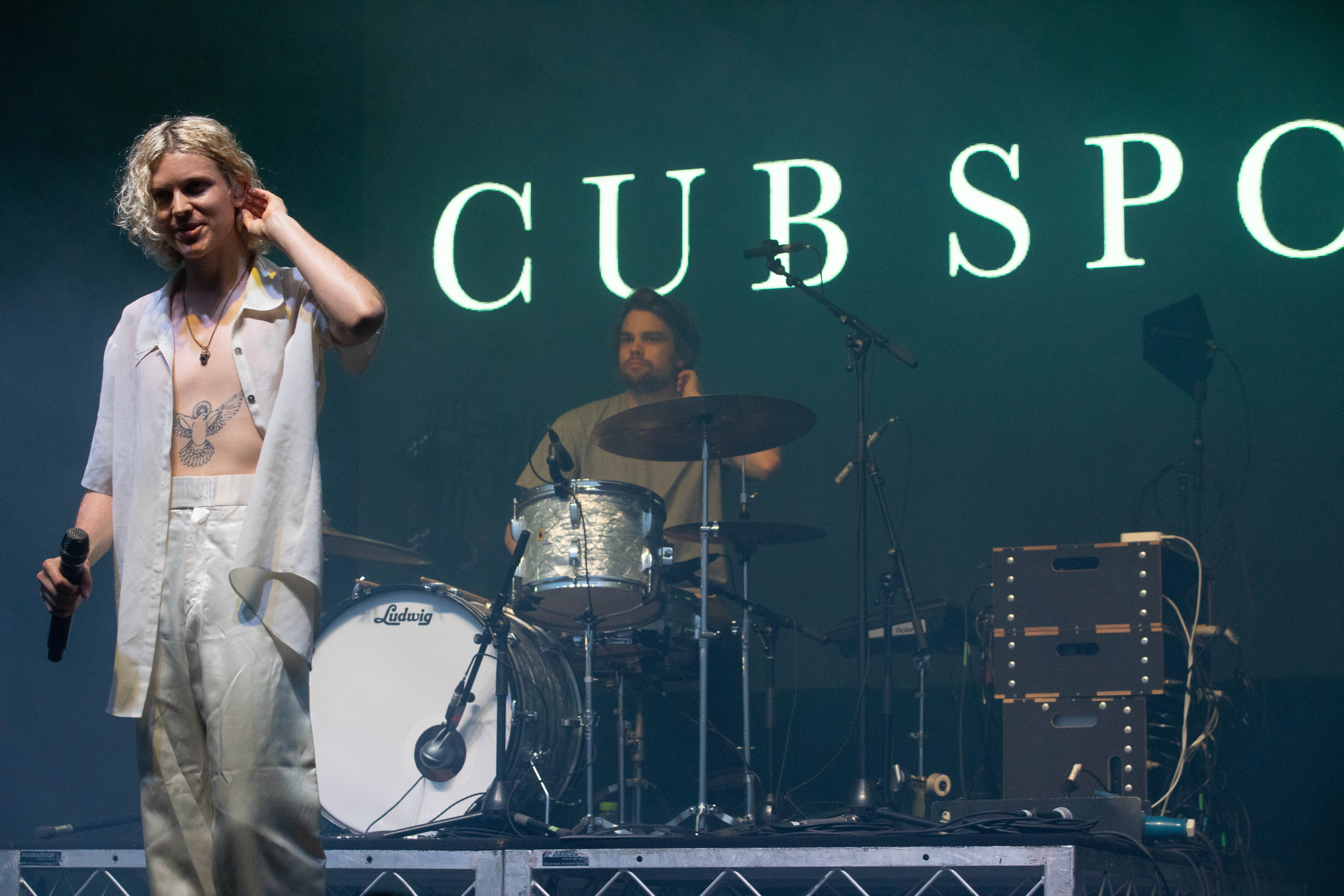
- Cub Sport performing at Falls Festival in Byron Bay, 2019. (L-R): Tim Nelson, Dan Puusaari.

Background information
- Also known as: Tim Nelson and the Cub Scouts; Cub Scouts
- Origin: Brisbane, Queensland, Australia
- Genres: Indie pop; dream pop; synthpop
- Years active: 2010–present
- Labels: Nettwork; MGM; Cub Sport
- Spinoffs: 2Charm
- Members: Zoe Davis; Tim Nelson; Sam Netterfield; Dan Puusaari
- Past members: Bek Stoodley; Andrew Williams
- Website: cubsport.com

Cub Sport are an Australian pop group formed in Brisbane in early 2010. Founding mainstays are Zoe Davis on keyboards, bass guitar, lead guitar and vocals, Tim Nelson on lead vocals and keyboards, Sam "Bolan" Netterfield on keyboards and vocals, and Dan Puusaari on drums. They have released five studio albums, This Is Our Vice (2016), Bats (2017), Cub Sport (2019), Like Nirvana (2020) and Jesus at the Gay Bar (2023). Jesus at the Gay Bar peaked at number one on the ARIA Albums Chart, Like Nirvana reached number two and Cub Sport appeared at number twelve. Nelson and Netterfield married in August 2018.

== History ==
=== 2010–2013: Early years ===
Cub Sport were originally formed as Tim Nelson & the Cub Scouts early in 2010 in Brisbane to promote Nelson's solo songs. The original six-piece line-up, was Zoe Davis on bass guitar and vocals, Tim Nelson on vocals and piano, Sam Netterfield on keyboards and vocals, Dan Puusaari on drums, Bek Stoodley on glockenspiel and vocals and Andrew Williams on guitar. Davis, Nelson, Netterfield and Williams had attended the same secondary school, Northside Christian College.

Tim Nelson & the Cub Scouts released a self-titled debut extended play (EP) in August 2010. Mediasearch's Dave Griffiths noticed, "Nelson's amazing voice that sets this group apart from the many other bands... Sweet and blissful this is for those who love the music of Decoder Ring or george." Adam Roberts of Alt Media felt, "as for hooks and chops among the quiet indie set, [Nelson] has all the right ingredients to make something bigger and better." Tiffany Bridger of Rave Magazine praised "Their rainbow of soft, whispery tunes – a fluttering on the glockenspiel, a series of Nelson's emotive keys throughout – make for a magical instrumental arrangement."

Following a line-up change, they shortened their name to Cub Scouts in 2011. They issued two singles — "Evie" in 2011 and "Do You Hear" in 2012; both received high rotation on national youth radio, Triple J. They released their six-track second EP, Told You So in October 2012. theMusic.com.au's Mat Lee observed, "[its] six songs are individual in their own right and the pace is effectively contrasted to highlight the shifts in context and emotion." They supported the EP's release with their second Australian tour. The title track gained popularity on US college radio. Another track, "Do You Hear" won two awards at the 2012 Queensland Music Awards.

The band officially changed their name to Cub Sport in August 2013 following a legal injunction by Scouts Australia. Nelson explained, "We got a cease and desist letter about a month ago asking us to stop using the name." Also in August, they released their five-track third EP, Paradise, which featured two singles: "Pool!" and the title track. On "Pool!" lead vocals were shared by Davis and Nelson. Initial pressings of Paradise still had the Cub Scouts band name, "it's annoying that [the injunction] came up in the middle of us releasing an EP, after we got 1500 copies" pressed. Cub Sport undertook a tour of United States and Europe during 2013.

=== 2014–2018: This Is Our Vice and Bats ===
Lead guitarist Andrew Williams left Cub Sport in 2014 but was not replaced, they continued as a four-piece, with both Nelson and Davis shifting to additional guitar duties. In October 2015 they released the first single, "Only Friend", from their debut album, This Is Our Vice, which appeared on 4 March 2016. It was produced by John Castle (Megan Washington, Vance Joy) for Nettwerk Records. Jaymz Clements of Rolling Stone (Australia) rated it at two stars and explained, "they fail to fire. It's fine for This Is Our Vice to slew more towards self-reflective, downer territory, but that it relies so heavily on well-tread synth-pop is where it lets itself down." Whereas AllMusic's Neil Z. Yeung gave it three-and-a-half stars and detailed, "With more electronic flourishes and a funkier vibe than their past efforts, the album shimmers, injecting tropical dance elements into its indie rock backbone."

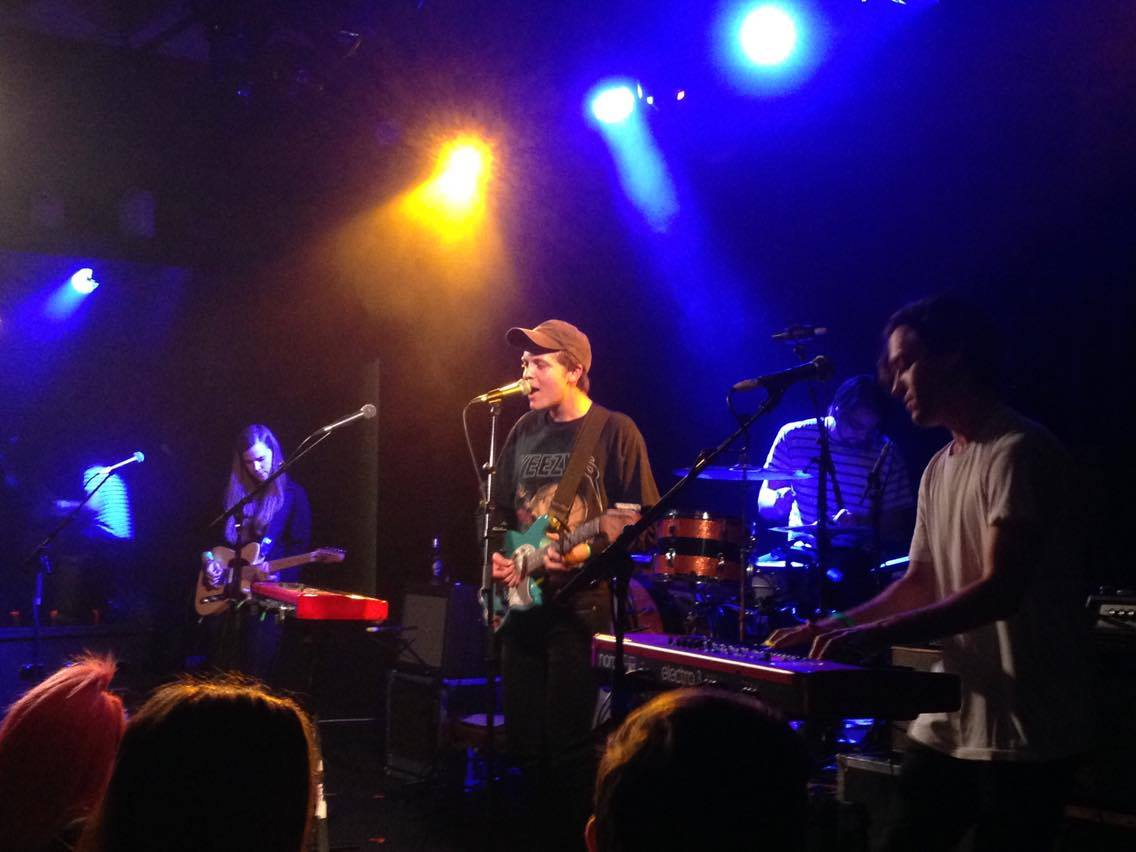
Cub Sport performing in Melbourne in 2016.

In August 2016, they performed a cover of Kanye West's "Ultralight Beam" on Triple J's programme, Like a Version. The third single, "Come On Mess Me Up", was listed at number 24 on the 2016 Triple J Hottest 100, their first ever appearance in the annual listeners poll. Cub Sport toured nationally and internationally in support of This Is Our Vice, both as head-liners and support act to Ball Park Music, Loon Lake, Andy Bull, Saskwatch, the 1975 and Big Scary. This Is Our Vice was re-released in April 2021, with two bonus tracks, and peaked in the top 60 on the ARIA Albums Chart.

In June 2017 Cub Sport released the first single, "O Lord", from their second album, Bats. The gospel-influenced "O Lord", was written about Nelson's experiences after coming out and his fear of losing his relationship with Netterfield. It was released on 22 September 2017 via MGM Distribution, with Castle and Nelson co-producing, which reached the ARIA Albums Chart top 100. Bats provided two further singles "Chasin'" (August 2017) and "Good Guys Go" (January 2018). Charlotte Saxon of Music Insight caught their performance in Perth in February 2018, "[they are] not afraid to share their most intimate personal stories with fans as they experiment with genres from RnB to pop to gospel. Although their songs are gut wrenching, they are beautiful none the less."

The band toured in support of Bats, including a headlining Australian tour in March 2018, a national support for Vance Joy in September and headlined Aurora Aksnes in October. In August 2018 Nelson and Netterfield were married after campaigning for legalization of same-sex marriage. A video for album track, "Hawaiian Party" was released in September 2018, which was directed and produced by the Dolan Twins. The video surpassed one million views within a week of its upload.

=== 2019–2021: Cub Sport to Like Nirvana ===
In October 2018 Cub Sport issued the lead single "Sometimes", from their third studio album, Cub Sport. In the following month they were inaugural winners of the ARIA Emerging Artist Scholarship. Cub Sport appeared on 18 January 2019 via the band's own imprint, Cub Sport Records and was distributed by MGM, again. It peaked at number 12 on the ARIA Albums Chart. Also in that month Billboard initiated Billboard Pride to celebrate an LGBTQ act, the inaugural Artist of the Month was Cub Sport. During their Australian tour in April, a live review said that Nelson "is literally like Brisbane's Justin Bieber but more indie and more gay".

Cub Sport released a duet single, "I Never Cried So Much in My Whole Life" (October 2019) featuring Darren Hayes. An article in The Courier-Mail praised the collaboration and referenced Nelson and Netterfield's alma mater; the band were prompted to tweet, "I'd just like to specify that Northside Christian College is a literal homophobic hellscape." In December they issued their fourth EP 333, which provided three singles released weekly over the month. Nelson explained, "333 is made up of three songs that fit together to conjure a feeling of deep and healing euphoria."

Like Nirvana, released on 24 July 2020, was Cub Sport's fourth studio album. Annabel Ross of the Australian edition of NME observed that on their "most stunning LP yet" Nelson describes how "liberation does not deliver permanent bliss, and that self-acceptance is a journey without a final destination." Its lead single, "Confessions", had appeared in March. Like Nirvana peaked at number 2 on the ARIA Albums Chart – their highest placing. In October they covered Powderfinger's "These Days" at the 2020 AFL Grand Final, which was held in Brisbane. During 2021 the group supported vaccinations against COVID-19, "[we] encourage our fans to get vaccinated, to help breathe life back into the music industry so we can come together to experience the magic of live shows again."

=== 2022–present: Jesus at the Gay Bar ===
In November 2022 Cub Sport released a single, "Replay". According to Nelson, "[It] is about moving forward. Feelings aren't as simple as we sometimes make out – you can long for something and not want it at the same time, you can love something but outgrow it. I think it's about shifting from longing for something to feeling free. But it also doesn't have to be that deep – It's a fun pop song and that's how I want it to be enjoyed too." In January 2023 the group announced their fifth studio album, Jesus at the Gay Bar, which was released on 7 April 2023. Its title references a poem by Jay Hulme. The album peaked at number one on the ARIA albums chart – the group's highest chart performance.

== Band members ==
Current

- Tim Nelson – lead vocals (2010–present), keyboards (2010–2018), guitar (2014–2018)
- Zoe Davis – backing and occasional lead vocals (2010–present), bass (2010–2014, 2017–2018, 2023–present), guitar (2014–present), keyboards (2017–present)
- Sam Netterfield – keyboards, backing vocals (2010–present)
- Dan Puusaari – drums (2010–present), keyboards (2018–present)

Former

- Bek Stoodley – backing vocals (2010–2011)
- Andrew Williams – guitar (2010–2014)

Timeline

== Discography ==
=== Studio albums ===
List of studio albums
Title	Album details	Peak chart positions
Title	Album details	AUS
This Is Our Vice	Released: 4 March 2016; Label: Cub Sport (CUB003); Formats: CD, digital download, LP	55
Bats	Released: 22 September 2017; Label: Cub Sport (CUB004); Formats: CD, digital download, streaming, LP	67
Cub Sport	Released: 18 January 2019; Label: Cub Sport (CUB005); Formats: CD, digital download, streaming, LP	12
Like Nirvana	Released: 24 July 2020; Label: Cub Sport (CUB007) / Believe; Formats: CD, digital download, streaming, LP	2
Jesus at the Gay Bar	Released: 7 April 2023; Label: Cub Sport (CUB008); Formats: CD, digital download, streaming, LP, CS	1

=== Live albums ===
List of live albums
Title	Album details
Triple J Live At the Wireless The Corner Hotel, Melbourne 2018	Released: 26 June 2020; Label: Australian Broadcasting Corporation; Formats: digital download, streaming
Like Nirvana (Live in Brisbane)	Released: 24 December 2020; Label: Cub Sport Records; Formats: Streaming

=== Extended plays ===
List of extended plays
Title	EP details
Tim Nelson & The Cub Scouts	Released: August 2010 (Australia); Label: Cub Scouts; Format: CD
Told You So	Released: 12 October 2012 (Australia); Label: Cub Scouts; Format: CD, digital download
Paradise	Released: 2 August 2013 (Australia); Label: Cub Scouts; Format: CD, digital download
333	Released: 24 December 2019 (Australia); Label: Cub Sport (CUB006); Format: Digital download, streaming, 7" (Limited to 333 copies)

=== Singles ===
List of singles
Title	Year	Certifications	Album
"Evie"	2011		Told You So
"Do You Hear"	2012		Told You So
"Told You So"	2012		Told You So
"Pool!"	2013		Paradise
"Paradise"	2013		Paradise
"Only Friend"	2015		This Is Our Vice
"I Can't Save You"	2016		This Is Our Vice
"Come On Mess Me Up"	2016	ARIA: Platinum	This Is Our Vice
"O Lord"	2017		Bats
"Chasin'"	2017	ARIA: Gold	Bats
"Good Guys Go"	2018		Bats
"Such Great Heights" (615 Session)	2018		Non-album single
"Give It to Me (Like You Mean It)" ([615 Session])	2018		Non-album single
"Sometimes"	2018	ARIA: Gold	Cub Sport
"Summer Lover"	2018		Cub Sport
"Party Pill"	2019		Cub Sport
"When the Party's Over" (Like a Version)	2019		Non-album single
"Chelsea Hotel No. 2" (Live from Moonshine Sessions)	2019		Non-album single
"Limousine"	2019		Cub Sport
"I Never Cried So Much in My Whole Life" (with Darren Hayes)	2019		Non-album single
"Heart in Halves"	2019		333
"City of Angels"	2019		333
"Air"	2019		333
"Confessions"	2020		Like Nirvana
"Drive"	2020		Like Nirvana
"I Feel Like I Am Changin'"	2020		Like Nirvana
"Be Your Man"	2020		Like Nirvana
"Break Me Down" (with Mallrat)	2020		Like Nirvana
"These Days"	2020		Non-album single
"Mine" (with BAYNK)	2021		Adolescence
"Always Got the Love"	2022		Jesus at the Gay Bar
"Replay"	2022		Jesus at the Gay Bar
"Keep Me Safe"	2023		Jesus at the Gay Bar
"Songs About It"	2023		Jesus at the Gay Bar
"Prada" (Like a Version)	2024		Non-album single
"I Forgot What's Love" (with Petit Biscuit)	2024		Discipline
"Miss You Still" (with Allday)	2024		The Necklace
"This Boy's in Love"	2025		Invisible Boys
"Mermaid" (with Pearly Drops)	2025		TBA
"Only You" (with Shouse)	—		Collective Ecstasy

=== Other appearances ===
List of other non-single song appearances
Title	Year	Album
"Blind" (with Dorsal Fin)	2016	Digital Zodiac
"Ultralight Beam"	2016	Like a Version - Volume 12
"Ballroom" (Cub Sport remix) (with Jack River)	2018	non album single
"Chasin'"	2018	Heard Well Collection (Volume 4)
"Angels 808" (with Oh Boy)	2019	Brentwood Heights
"Can't Get You Out of My Head" (Amazon Original)	2023	Amazon Original
"Flame Trees" (Cub Sport remix) (with Sarah Blasko)	2024	non album single

== Awards ==
=== AIR Awards ===
The Australian Independent Record Awards (commonly known informally as AIR Awards) is an annual awards night to recognise, promote and celebrate the success of Australia's Independent Music sector.

Year	Nominee / work	Award	Result	Ref.
2020	Cub Sport	Best Independent Pop Album or EP	Nominated	
2021	Like Nirvana	Best Independent Pop Album or EP	Nominated	
2023	"Always Got the Love"	Independent Song of the Year	Nominated	
2023	"Always Got the Love"	Best Independent Dance, Electronica or Club Single	Won	
2024	Jesus at the Gay Bar	Independent Album of the Year	Nominated	
2024	Jesus at the Gay Bar	Best Independent Dance or Electronica Album or EP	Won	
2024	Adam Munnings – Cub Sport – "Keep Me Safe"	Independent Music Video of the Year	Won	

=== ARIA Music Awards ===
The ARIA Music Awards is an annual award ceremony event celebrating the Australian music industry.

Year	Nominee / work	Award	Result	Ref.
2023	Jesus at the Gay Bar	Best Group	Nominated	
2023	Jesus at the Gay Bar	Best Independent Release	Nominated	
2023	Sam Netterfiled, Mia Rankin for Cub Sport – Jesus at the Gay Bar	Best Cover Art	Nominated	

=== National Live Music Awards ===
The National Live Music Awards (NLMAs) are a broad recognition of Australia's diverse live industry, celebrating the success of the Australian live scene. The awards commenced in 2016.

Year	Nominee / work	Award	Result	Ref.
2019	themselves	Queensland Live Act of the Year	Won	
2020	Zoe Davis (Cub Sport)	Live Instrumentalist of the Year	Nominated	

=== Queensland Music Awards ===
The Queensland Music Awards (previously known as Q Song Awards) are annual awards celebrating Queensland, Australia's brightest emerging artists and established legends. They commenced in 2006.

Year	Nominee / work	Award	Result (wins only)	Ref.
2012	"Do You Hear"	Song of the Year	Won	
2012	"Do You Hear"	Pop Song of the Year	Won	
2017	Themselves	The BOQ People's Choice Award for Most Popular Group	Won	
2024	Jesus at the Gay Bar	Album of the Year	Won	
2024	"Songs About It"	Electronic Award	Won	
