= Restless (Allday song) =

Single by Allday featuring The Veronicas

from the album Starry Night Over the Phone
- Released: 7 June 2019
- Length: 3:12
- Songwriters: Tomas Gaynor; Shama Joseph; Simon Lam

Allday singles chronology
"Lungs" (2019)	"Restless" (2019)	"All Da Way" (2019)

The Veronicas singles chronology
"Think of Me" (2019)	"Restless" (2019)	"Ugly" (2019)

Music video
- "Restless" on YouTube

"Restless" is a song by Australian rapper Allday featuring Australian pop duo The Veronicas. It was released on 7 June 2019 as the fourth single from Allday's third studio album Starry Night Over the Phone. They performed the song live on Triple J on the day of its release along with a cover of Joni Mitchell's "Big Yellow Taxi".

== Music video ==
The music video for "Restless" was filmed in Adelaide and directed and produced by Rory Pippan and released on 25 June 2019. Allday said "I went back to Adelaide (my hometown) to shoot all the videos for this album and I wanted to capture the desolation and boredom of the place. Growing up in a boring place was fantastic for me because it sparked my imagination; where I'm from is really important to me. We used that as inspiration, and exaggerated a lot of the light and dark aspects of the place for this video."

== Reception ==
Thomas Bleach from The Music Network described the collaboration as "a match made in heaven" and "a soothing pop song full of sweet harmonies". Bleach said: "The two Aussie acts were able to draw from their unique sounds and fuse together a slick vibe that audiences will instantly fall in love with."

Mike Wass from Idolator described the song as "one of [his] favorite songs of the year" saying "'Restless' is an unusually honest breakup anthem with enough hooks to fill a hardware store."
