= Maybe We Could =

Studio album by Kllo
- Released: July 17, 2020
- Genres: Alternative R&B, 2-step garage, UK bass, downtempo
- Length: 34:57
- Labels: Ghostly International; Good Manners; Plancha (Japan)
- Producer: Kllo

Kllo chronology
Backwater (2017)	Maybe We Could (2020)

Maybe We Could is the second studio album by Australian music duo Kllo. It was released on July 17, 2020, through Ghostly International, Good Manners and Plancha Records (in Japan).

== Critical reception ==
Professional ratings
Aggregate scores
Source	Rating
Metacritic	65/100
Review scores
Source	Rating
AllMusic	3.5/5 stars
Euphoria Magazine	4/5 stars
Exclaim!	7/10
The Fire Note	3.5/5 stars
The Music Australia	4/5 stars
No Ripcord	4/10
NME	3/5 stars

At Metacritic, which assigns a weighted average score out of 100 to reviews from mainstream critics, the album received an average score of 65, based on 4 reviews, indicating "generally favorable reviews".

AllMusic's Paul Simpson awarded Maybe We Could three-and-a-half-stars, highlighting "Still Here" and "Somehow" saying "drawing from rave, garage, and updated permutations of such [...] the songs are never dense or overloaded, and there's plenty of space for Kaul's clear, yearning lyrics" Euphoria Magazine's Andrew Wright described the album as "a suave reincarnation of their debut’s blend of heart-wrenching vocals, and dewy, 90s-inflected dance beats." Joseph LeRoux of Exclaim! scored Maybe We Could seven-out-of-ten noting "the elements at play here are not new for Kllo" detailing "you get a sense of growth within the artists two personalities: the balladeer in Kae presents a more sombre edge, while the sensitive dancefloor inclinations of Lam angle more readily towards a minimal hedonism". The Fire Note's Brian Q. Newcomb scored the album three-and-a-half-stars, saying Maybe We Could "shimmers with rich textures and the kind of songwriting that insinuates itself into your head, while the beat moves you toward the dancefloor".

The Music Australia's Cyclone Wehner awarded Maybe We Could four-out-of-five stars, commending the duo's reserved approach to electronic music saying, "downtempo, experimental and textured, yet Kllo's songwriting has solidified. The individualised material here is introspective, subtle, and alternately angular and curved". No Ripcord's Joe Marvilli received the album less positively, scoring the album four-out-of-ten, noting "There are lots of alluring instrumental pieces that show potential, but Kllo treats them as decorative rather than core aspects." NME's Annabel Ross presented the album with a three-star score, commenting "On ‘Maybe We Could’, Kllo are still making moodily lit club music for shy people, but it feels like they have less to prove this time around" and describing the production as a "switch to quiet storm R&B, where narcotised beats anchor Kaul’s more purposeful singing amid swirls of lilting keys".

== Track listing ==
All tracks are written by Kllo.

No.	Title	Length
1.	"Cursed"	3:42
2.	"Still Here"	3:35
3.	"Insomnia"	3:37
4.	"My Gemini"	3:18
5.	"Somehow"	3:23
6.	"Maybe We Could"	2:58
7.	"Ironhand"	3:12
8.	"1 Up"	3:20
9.	"A Mirror"	5:02
10.	"Just Checking In"	2:50
Total length:		34:57

== Personnel ==
Credits adapted from liner notes.

- Chloe Kaul – art direction, composer
- Simon Lam – art direction, composer, mixing
- Andrei Eremin – mastering
- Joseph Clough – art direction
- Molly Smith – art direction
- Edward Goldner – photography
