= Cub Sport (album) =

Studio album by Cub Sport
- Released: 18 January 2019
- Length: 45:37
- Label: Cub Sport
- Producers: Tim Nelson, Max Byrne

Cub Sport chronology
| Bats (2017) | Cub Sport (2019) | Like Nirvana (2020) |

Singles from Cub Sport
- 1. "Sometimes" Released: 5 October 2018; 2. "Summer Lover" Released: 24 December 2018; 3. "Party Pill" Released: 11 January 2019; 4. "Limousine" Released: May 2019

Cub Sport is the third studio album by Australian alt-pop group Cub Sport, released on 18 January 2019. The album debuted at number 12 on the ARIA Charts.

Upon the announcement of the album, band member Tim Nelson explained the inspiration behind the album "This record lays me bare but I can't wait to share it because I truly believe it's going to take you somewhere else. The past 12 months has felt like the most transformative year of my life and I've been fortunate enough to have many of you as a part of the journey. This album captures everything you saw happening as well as everything else that was happening that you couldn't see. It hasn't been an easy year but I've grown so much, learned so much and loved so much. This album is about facing inner fears, living your truth, harnessing your power, being yourself, believing in yourself, loving yourself and healing yourself. Cub Sport by Cub Sport has grown from love, self-belief and never giving up. This record has completely opened me up to the universe around me and within me, something I hope it will do for you too".

At the AIR Awards of 2020, the album was nominated for Best Independent Pop Album or EP. "Sometimes", the first single from the album, was certified Gold by the Australian Recording Industry Association (ARIA) in 2020.

== Reception ==
Professional ratings
Review scores
| Source | Rating |
|---|---|
| The AU Review | 4/5 stars |
| Fortitude Magazine | 8.5/10 stars |
| Music News | 3/5 stars |

Tait McGregor from The AU Review wrote: "The most impressive element of the work is the vulnerability Tim finds in what could easily have been flippant electronic tracks. His lyrics are deeply personal, like they've been ripped from a page in his sixteen-year-old diary". McGregor concluded the review by saying: "Cub Sport can easily become the soundtrack to Summer 2019. It's melancholic warm and the perfect listen lying on the beach. But more importantly, this album is more than just music. Tim Nelson gifts fans with a message of empathy and self-love that goes beyond listening and deep seeds itself into a mantra, helping to heal the souls it touches."

Eleanor Pettipher from Fortitude Magazine opined that "Cub Sport have moved on from pop to gospel-influenced sound to now experiment with a more urban, fresh vibe. Their versatility seems to know no bounds and Tim's vocal is one of the purest you'll ever hear. Let's hope this album propels Cub Sport to the heights they deserve."

Joe McIndoe from Music News said: "The [band's] previous work focused on self-doubt and the storyteller's fear of being unworthy of his lover's affections. Across the 15 tracks, that theme is still present to a certain extent, but on the whole, it's about sticking together and expressing the couples love for each other." He summarised: "Overall, this self-titled album is a solid continuation of the work on Bats. The vocals are excellent, and the LP is thematically interesting at times. Unfortunately, along album isn't helped by a few lyrical bumps in the road."

Al Newstead from Triple J said "Cub Sport have delivered 2019s first great queer album." He added: "Glowing in poptimist tones and draped in tender synth-soul and mid-tempo RnB, Cub Sport is a loved-up record that banishes fear through a celebration identity, sexuality, and spirituality."

== Track listing ==
| No. | Title | Writer(s) | Length |
|---|---|---|---|
| 1. | "Unwinding Myself" (intro) | Tim Nelson | 2:44 |
| 2. | "Video" (featuring Mallrat) | Nelson; Grace Shaw | 3:04 |
| 3. | "Sometimes" | Nelson | 2:33 |
| 4. | "Limousine" | Nelson; Max Byrne | 4:30 |
| 5. | "Lift Me Up" | Nelson | 3:09 |
| 6. | "Light II" | Nelson; Sam Netterfield | 2:03 |
| 7. | "Butterflies" | Nelson; Byrne | 2:43 |
| 8. | "Trees" | Nelson; Byrne | 3:27 |
| 9. | "Come Out" | Nelson; Byrne | 2:59 |
| 10. | "Party Pill" | Nelson | 2:56 |
| 11. | "As Long as You're Happy" | Nelson | 4:17 |
| 12. | "Acid Rain" (featuring Al Wright) | Nelson; Byrne; Al Wright | 2:51 |
| 13. | "Stars" | Nelson | 2:36 |
| 14. | "I'm Not Scared" | Nelson | 3:29 |
| 15. | "Summer Lover" | Nelson | 2:16 |

== Charts ==
| Chart (2019) | Peak position |
|---|---|
| Australian Albums (ARIA) | 12 |

== Release history ==
| Region | Date | Format | Label | Catalogue | Ref. |
|---|---|---|---|---|---|
| Australia | 18 January 2019 | CD; digital download; Vinyl; streaming | Cub Sport | CUB005 / CUB005V | |
