= Come On Mess Me Up =

Single by Cub Sport

from the album This Is Our Vice
- Released: August 2016
- Length: 3:23
- Label: Cub Sport
- Songwriter(s): Tim Nelson

Cub Sport singles chronology
"I Can't Save You" (2016)	"Come On Mess Me Up" (2016)	"O Lord" (2017)

Music video
- "Come On Mess Me Up" on YouTube

"Come On Mess Me Up" is a song by Australian alt-pop group Cub Sport, released in August 2016 as the third and final single from the group's debut studio album This Is Our Vice. The song was certified platinum in Australia in February 2020.

Lead singer Tim Nelson said "My dad has a book of Leonard Cohen lyrics that I was reading [and] it inspired me to be more honest and genuine with my writing. "Come On Mess Me Up" sounds a bit like a desperate love ballad; I guess it kind of is a desperate love ballad about my relationship with music. I wrote it about how I want to keep doing this even if it messes me up a bit along the way — pursuing music can be pretty rough mentally and physically. The verses more or less follow my journey from when I first started writing/recording songs when I was working on Sparkes St, to when I went to uni to study dentistry then un-enrolled three years in so I could pursue music. The third verse references when we were touring overseas and I got really sick — that's what 'throwing up real hard' line is about. This song is one of my favourites on the album."

"Come On Mess Me Up", reached number 24 on the Triple J Hottest 100, 2016.

== Music video ==
The music video was released on 19 May 2016. It was directed and edited by Joe Agius and sees Nelson crooning to the camera while smearing layer upon layer of green-screened paint on his face, creating a deeply creepy effect of multiple faces contending with each other to occupy the same space. The compelling clip showcases a rare air of vulnerability in a stark departure from the indie-pop band's more playful previous work.

== Certifications ==
Region	Certification	Certified units/sales
Australia (ARIA)	Platinum	70,000^{‡}
^{‡} Sales+streaming figures based on certification alone.
