= You Always Know the DJ =

Single by Allday

from the album Startup Cult
- Released: 12 September 2014
- Length: 3:50
- Label: ONETWO
- Songwriter(s): Tom Gaynor, Andrew Burford, Charles Ludik
- Producer(s): One Above

Allday singles chronology
"Cult" (2014)	"You Always Know the DJ" (2014)	"Wolves" (2014)

Music video
- "You Always Know the DJ" on YouTube

"You Always Know the DJ" is a song by Australian rapper Allday. It was released in September 2014 as the third single from the Allday's debut studio album Startup Cult. The single was certified gold in Australia in 2018.

== Track listing ==
Digital download

1. "You Always Know the DJ" (MD remix) – 3:38
2. "You Always Know the DJ" – 3:50

== Certifications ==
Region	Certification	Certified units/sales
Australia (ARIA)	Gold	35,000^{‡}
^{‡} Sales+streaming figures based on certification alone.
