= Speeding (album) =

Studio album by Allday
- Released: 21 April 2017
- Genre: Australian hip hop; alternative hip hop
- Length: 43:08
- Label: OneTwo

Allday chronology
Startup Cult (2014)	Speeding (2017)	Starry Night Over the Phone (2019)

Singles from Speeding
- 1. "Sides" Released: 15 June 2016; 2. "Raceway" Released: 15 December 2016; 3. "In Motion" Released: 17 March 2017

Speeding is the second studio album by Australian rap artist Allday. It was released on 21 April 2017 and peaked at number 6 on the ARIA Charts. The album spawned three singles: "Sides", "Raceway", and "In Motion".

In an interview with The AU Review, Allday said "I would consider Speeding to be more of a snapshot of a period in my life. I felt like making something that felt like winter and was really personal." adding "I don't think my next album will sound much like Speeding. I think I've got it out of my system a little bit."

== Critical reception ==
John Papadopoulos from The Music said "While many Australian rappers seem content to make music for lounging on Bondi Beach... Allday's music is in the here and now. If you close your eyes, you might even be led to think this was Tory Lanez or (maybe too optimistically) Travis Scott, only with strange references to a place called Melbourne. This isn't to say that Allday's music is derivative; only that it's strikingly contemporary enough to be compared with those artists."

== Track listing ==
No.	Title	Length
1.	"First Light"	3:18
2.	"In Motion" (featuring Japanese Wallpaper)	3:43
3.	"10 Drinks"	3:15
4.	"No Saint"	3:25
5.	"Ghost"	3:01
6.	"Raceway"	3:18
7.	"Codeine 17" (featuring Gracelands)	3:50
8.	"North Melbourne"	3:37
9.	"Sides" (featuring Nyne)	3:38
10.	"Spill My Blood"	3:40
11.	"Baby Spiders" (featuring Mallrat)	4:31
12.	"Ultramarine" (featuring Mallrat)	3:52

== Charts ==
Chart (2017)	Peak position
Australian Albums (ARIA)	6

== Release history ==
Region	Date	Format	Edition(s)	Label	Catalogue
Australia	21 April 2017	CD; digital download; LP	Standard	ONETWO	ONETWO005
