= Backwater (album) =

Studio album by Kllo
- Released: 20 October 2017
- Genres: Alternative R&B, 2-step garage, UK bass, indietronica, electropop
- Length: 46:08
- Labels: Different; Ghostly International
- Producer: Kllo

Kllo chronology
| Well Worn (EP) (2016) | Backwater (2017) | Maybe We Could (2020) |

Backwater is the first studio album by Australian music duo Kllo. It was released on 20 October 2017.

== Critical reception ==
Professional ratings
Aggregate scores
| Source | Rating |
|---|---|
| Metacritic | 76/100 |
Review scores
| Source | Rating |
| Clash | 7/10 |
| Exclaim! | 7/10 |
| The 405 | 7.5/10 |
| The Line of Best Fit | 8.5/10 |
| Paste | 7.5/10 |
| Pitchfork | 6.3/10 |
| PopMatters | favorable |
| XLR8R | favorable |

At Metacritic, which assigns a weighted average score out of 100 to reviews from mainstream critics, the album received an average score of 76, based on 8 reviews, indicating "generally favorable reviews".

Ashley Hampson of Exclaim described the album as "a mature, thoughtful project that explores and attempts to reconcile the ideas of isolation and vulnerability with comfort and familiarity." William Sutton of PopMatters wrote, "There is a strong stylistic motif that carries through, but within this, there is a subtle exploration of sounds and styles, which only an album format would allow, with touches of '90s R&B, UK garage, electronica, and sultry pop all evident." James Kilpin of Clash stated that "Tracks like 'Last Yearn' and 'Too Fast' see them reach new levels of delicacy, with club influences more prominent elsewhere, but the pervasive dreaminess and charm ultimately results in an absorbing debut album."

Jack Tregoning of Junkee placed the album at number 9 on the "10 Best Albums of 2017" list.

== Track listing ==
All tracks are written by Kllo.

| No. | Title | Length |
|---|---|---|
| 1. | "Downfall" | 3:36 |
| 2. | "Still Motion" | 0:29 |
| 3. | "Virtue" | 3:40 |
| 4. | "Predicament" | 3:45 |
| 5. | "Last Yearn" | 5:08 |
| 6. | "Backwater" | 1:36 |
| 7. | "Dissolve" | 3:44 |
| 8. | "By Your Side" | 5:40 |
| 9. | "Making Distractions" | 4:29 |
| 10. | "Too Fast" | 4:47 |
| 11. | "Nylon" | 4:14 |
| 12. | "Not like Them" | 5:01 |
| Total length: | | 46:08 |

== Personnel ==
Credits adapted from liner notes.

- Kllo – production
- Simon Lam – mixing
- Andrei Eremin – mixing (on "Virtue"), mastering
- 12:01 (Office of Hassan Rahim) – art direction
- Hayley Louisa Brown – photography
