= Nobody's Home (Mallrat song) =

2019 single by Mallrat and Basenji

Single by Mallrat and Basenji
- Released: 1 February 2019
- Genre: Electropop
- Length: 3:36
- Label: Mallrat (independent); Dew Process
- Composers: Grace Shaw; Sebastian Carlos Muecke
- Lyricists: Shaw; Muecke
- Producer: Basenji

Mallrat singles chronology
"Groceries" (2018)	"Nobody's Home" (2019)	"Charlie" (2019)

Basenji singles chronology
"Mistakes" (2017)	"Nobody's Home" (2019)	"Perfect Blue" (2019)

Music video
- "Nobody's Home" on YouTube

"Nobody's Home" is a song by Australian musician Mallrat and Australian producer Basenji, released independently on 1 February 2019 via Dew Process.

Written by Shaw and Basenji and produced solely by the latter, "Nobody's Home" debuted and peaked at number 17 on the New Zealand Hot Singles Chart, received a platinum ARIA certification in both artists' home country of Australia, and placed at number 59 in Triple J's Hottest 100 of 2019.

== Background ==
"Nobody's Home" is Shaw's first single since "Groceries"—which became Mallrat's breakthrough single in 2018, placing at number 7 in Triple J's Hottest 100 of 2018, whilst for Basenji it marks his first release since "Mistakes", a collaboration with Tkay Maidza, in 2017.

Discussing how the collaboration came about in an interview with Australian youth radio station Triple J, Shaw stated:

"We met early last year [2018] but I've been a fan of him for such a long time. I love the way he dresses, which is random to say, but it matches the way his music sounds; he pairs fun different things together."

Shaw additionally stated that she frequently listens to Basenji's track "Can't Get Enough".

== Critical reception ==
Laura English from Music Feeds felt "Nobody's Home" had "that infectious lyrical delivery that defines Mallrat's sound and has all these sweet, layered, little sounds that are arranged in a really cool way, courtesy of Basenji." Mike Wass of Idolator thought the track to be an "understated electro-pop anthem" and stated it was "a winning addition to an already impressive discography." The Music Network named "Nobody's Home" their "Song of the Day", with a staff writer dubbing it a "must-hear", feeling the song to be "a vibrant and weirdly cheerful expression of longingness and falling in love." In particular, they praised the "layered" textures of the song and Basenji's "glossy synth tones".

=== Accolades ===
"Nobody's Home" placed at number 59 in Triple J's Hottest 100 of 2019.

== Commercial performance ==
"Nobody's Home" debuted and peaked at number 17 on the New Zealand Top 40 Hot Singles Chart on the chart dated 8 February 2019, before falling out the following week.

"Nobody's Home" was certified gold in Australia on 26 April 2019, and platinum on 4 June 2021, for shipments in excess of 35,000 and 70,000 track-equivalent units, respectively.

== Personnel ==
Adapted from Spotify.

=== Performers ===
- Basenji – programming
- Grace Shaw – vocals

=== Writing and arrangement ===
- Grace Shaw – composition, lyrics
- Sebastian Carlos Muecke – composition, lyrics

=== Production and engineering ===
- Basenji – production, studio personnel, engineering
- Andrew Dawson – studio personnel, mixing
- Chris Athens – studio personnel, mastering, engineering
- Charles Daly – studio personnel, engineering

== Charts ==
Chart performance for "Nobody's Home"
Chart (2021)	Peak position
New Zealand Hot Singles (RMNZ)	17

== Certifications ==
Region	Certification	Certified units/sales
Australia (ARIA)	Platinum	70,000^{‡}
^{‡} Sales+streaming figures based on certification alone.
