= Sometimes (Cub Sport song) =

Single by Cub Sport

from the album Cub Sport
- Released: 5 October 2018
- Length: 2:33
- Label: Cub Sport
- Songwriter(s): Tim Nelson

Cub Sport singles chronology
"Give It to Me (Like You Mean It) [615 Session]" (2018)	"Sometimes" (2018)	"Summer Lover" (2018)

Music video
- "Sometimes" on YouTube

"Sometimes" is a song by Australian alt-pop group Cub Sport, released in October 2018 as the lead single from the group's third studio album, Cub Sport (January 2019). It peaked at No. 15 on the ARIA Hitseekers Singles Chart in February 2019. The single was certified gold in Australia in 2020. "Sometimes" was listed at number 30 on the Triple J Hottest 100, 2018.

== Music video ==
"Sometimes"' music video was released on 5 October 2018. It was directed by Brittney Scott and has Tim Nelson perform the track in close-up with the visuals going in and out of focus, while a double exposure of a landscape emerges.

== Reception ==
Hayden Davies from PileRats said "'Sometimes' debuts a new pop-centric side of Cub Sport, uniting their signature indie-pop charm with a euphoric, 90s-esque synth line and Nelson's bright vocals, which this time around, feels a lot more confident and self-assured."

== Certifications ==
Region	Certification	Certified units/sales
Australia (ARIA)	Gold	35,000^{‡}
^{‡} Sales+streaming figures based on certification alone.
