= Claude Monet (song) =

Single by Allday
- Released: December 2013
- Length: 3:53
- Label: OneTwo
- Songwriters: Tomas Gaynor; Simon Lam; David von Mering; Grant Yarber
- Producers: David von Mering; YOG$

Allday singles chronology
"Bags Packed" (2013)	"Claude Monet" (2013)	"Right Now" (2014)

Music video
- "Claude Monet" on YouTube

"Claude Monet" is a song by Australian rapper Allday, released as a single in December 2013. The single was certified gold in Australia in 2021.

About the song, Allday said "I guess it's about growing up and how things get out of control before you know it. Claude Monet was credited with inventing the Impressionist movement and his paintings look blurry up close, but make sense from a distance. So I thought that would be a fitting metaphor."

== Music video ==
The music video was filmed in Adelaide, South Australia and produced by Simplex & Cam Bluff.

== Track listing ==
Digital download

1. "Claude Monet" – 3:53

== Certifications ==
Region	Certification	Certified units/sales
Australia (ARIA)	Gold	35,000^{‡}
^{‡} Sales+streaming figures based on certification alone.
