= Driving Music (EP) =

EP by Mallrat
- Released: 6 September 2019
- Length: 16:37
- Label: Dew Process
- Producer: Mallrat; Miro Mackie; Fossa Beats; Aalias; Big Taste; Lucian Blomkamp

Mallrat chronology
In the Sky (2018)	Driving Music (2019)	Butterfly Blue (2022)

Singles from Driving Music
- 1. "Charlie" Released: 7 August 2019

Driving Music is the third EP by Australian singer songwriter Mallrat. It was released on 6 September 2019 and peaked at number 10 on the ARIA Charts.

Upon release, Mallrat said "I feel like so many of life's most special moments happen in the car. Not the whole EP but, a lot of it is like a journal of the most special times. I'm just really excited to share it with everyone, cause I've been hoarding it on my laptop for so long, listening to the songs everyday. I think they're really amazing songs."

== Reception ==
Professional ratings
Review scores
Source	Rating
Newcastle Herald	3/5 stars

Josh Leeson from Newcastle Herald said "Mallrat has created a trademark sound over two EPs which is unmistakable; nostalgic lyrical sketches with hypnotically repetitive melodies over chilled downbeats... and on Driving Music the specific sound has become almost impossible to escape". Lesson added called the song "Charlie" the EP's "most beautiful moment."

Rhian Daly from NME said "Aside from being full of great songs, one of Driving Music's strengths is its ability to make you feel like you're having an out-of-body experience, viewing the world from up above as Shaw puts her relationships and experiences under a microscope." and it "makes the everyday moments magical."

Sam Murphy from The Interns said "Driving Music is the best project she's ever released. Her voice is more present than ever, not just because it's stronger but also because what she's saying is more profound... [The EP] is essentially a collection of songs about companionship – the warmth of being together and the isolation of being alone."

Laura Hughes from Amnplify said "Driving Music is more than just light-hearted music that breathes and sings summer tunes. The dreampop-like music masks the sensitive topics that her lyrics cover, and will quickly become songs to add to your playlist."

== Track listing ==
No.	Title	Writer(s)	Length
1.	"Intro"	Grace Shaw; Miro Mackie	1:21
2.	"Drive Me Round"	Shaw	3:10
3.	"Circles"	Shaw; Daniel Lindsay	3:34
4.	"When I Get My Braces Off"	Shaw; Aaron Kleinstub	2:18
5.	"Charlie"	Shaw; Leroy Clampitt	3:11
6.	"Stay"	Shaw; Lucian Blomkamp	3:03

== Charts ==
Chart (2019)	Peak position
Australian Albums (ARIA)	10

== Release history ==
Region	Date	Format(s)	Label	Catalogue
Australia	6 September 2019	CD, Digital download, streaming, 12" Vinyl	Dew Process	DEW9001185
