= Basenji (producer) =

Australian electronic musician and DJ

- Birth name: Sebastian Carlos Muecke
- Also known as: Soobs
- Born: Sydney, New South Wales, Australia
- Genres: EDM
- Occupations: Electronic musician; DJ
- Years active: 2013–present
- Labels: future classic.

Basenji (born Sebastian Carlos Muecke) is an Australian electronic musician and DJ. He gained popularity through the Triple J Unearthed competition. He was then signed to the record label, future classic in 2014, through which he released several singles and one extended play. He has performed at Splendour In The Grass and Falls Festival.

According to Hannah Galvin of Purple Sneakers, "[he] is making amazing, boundary-pushing electronic music; something he's been lucky enough to take up full-time. Looking ridiculously comfortable on stage, [he] played a nice big bunch of both original and remixed tracks, including a slowed down, sensual version of Disclosure's 'Latch' and his breakthrough single 'Dawn'."

His track, "Can't Get Enough" (2015), is used in the opening of the techno thriller film, Nerve (July 2016), and on its associated soundtrack. He undertook a tour of the United States. His single, "Mistakes" (featuring Tkay Maidza) (November 2017), peaked at No. 16 on the ARIA Charts Hitseekers Singles chart. AllMusic's Matt Collar observed, "[he] is an in-demand electronic musician, DJ, and producer known for his buoyant, pop-oriented tracks."

== Discography ==
=== Extended plays ===
Title	Details
Trackpad	Released: 12 October 2015; Label: Future Classic; Format: Digital download, streaming

=== Singles ===
List of singles as lead artist, with year released and album details shown
Title	Year	Peak chart positions	Certifications	Album
Title	Year	AUS Hitseekers	Certifications	Album
"Speak with a Dofflin'"	2013	—		non album single
"Dawn"	2014	—		Trackpad
"Heirloom"	2014	—		Trackpad
"Petals" (featuring Scenic)	2015	—		Trackpad
"Can't Get Enough"	2015	—		Trackpad
"Chroma"	2016	—		One in a Million (A Future Classic Compilation)
"Don't Let Go" (featuring Mereki)	2017	—		to be confirmed
"Mistakes" (featuring Tkay Maidza)	2017	16		to be confirmed
"Nobody's Home" (with Mallrat)	2019	—	ARIA: Platinum	to be confirmed
"Perfect Blue" (featuring Erthlings)	2019	—		to be confirmed
"La La La" (featuring Eves Karydas)	2022	—		TBA
"Walk Away" (featuring Ric Rufio)	2022	—		TBA
