= Better (Mallrat song) =

Single by Mallrat

from the album In the Sky
- Released: 13 October 2017
- Length: 3:13
- Label: Dew Process
- Producer: Konstantin Kersting

Mallrat singles chronology
"For Real" (2016)	"Better" (2017)	"UFO" (2018)

Music video
- "Better" on YouTube

"Better" is a song by Australian musician Mallrat. It was released in October 2017 as the lead single from Mallrat's second EP In the Sky.

In May 2018, the song won Best Unpublished Work in the Vanda & Young Global Songwriting Competition.

The song was certified gold in Australia in 2019.

== Background ==
Mallrat said she wrote the songs in July 2016 saying "the lyrics were very easy to write but it took about a year to get the instrumentation sounding exactly like it did in my brain."

== Reception ==
Thomas Smith from NME called the song a "youthful, joyous uplifting banger."

== Track listing ==
Digital download

1. "Better" – 3:13

== Certifications ==
Region	Certification	Certified units/sales
Australia (ARIA)	Platinum	70,000^{‡}
^{‡} Sales+streaming figures based on certification alone.
