= Protection (Allday song) =

Single by Allday

from the album Starry Night Over the Phone
- Released: 22 March 2019
- Length: 3:33
- Label: OneTwo
- Songwriter(s): Tomas Gaynor; Simon Lam; David von Mering; Grant Yarber
- Producer(s): David von Mering; YOG$

Allday singles chronology
"Wonder Drug" (2018)	"Protection" (2019)	"Lungs" (2019)

"Protection" is a song by Australian rapper Allday, released on 22 March 2019 as the second single from the Allday's third studio album Starry Night Over the Phone. The single was certified gold in Australia in 2021.

== Reception ==
Al Newstead from Triple J said "'Protection' finds Allday lamenting on lost love in a cloud of woozy guitars and understated beats".

== Track listing ==
Digital download

1. "Protection" – 3:33

== Certifications ==
Region	Certification	Certified units/sales
Australia (ARIA)	Gold	35,000^{‡}
^{‡} Sales+streaming figures based on certification alone.
