= Loners Are Cool =

EP by Allday
- Released: 5 April 2013
- Label: Teamtrick

Allday chronology
A Skateboard Soirée (2012)	Loners Are Cool (2013)	Startup Cult (2014)

Loners Are Cool is the second extended play by Australian rap artist Allday. It was released in April 2013 and peaked at number 18 on the ARIA Charts. The EP was certified gold in Australia in 2019.

== Track listing ==
No.	Title	Length
1.	"Breathe Slow"	3:33
2.	"Fly"	3:22
3.	"Girl in the Sun" (featuring Brady James)	2:43
4.	"Single Mother Song" (featuring Momo)	3:49
5.	"Otto"	3:07
6.	"That Phone Is a Brick"	3:29
7.	"Eyes On the Road"	4:37

== Charts ==
Chart (2013)	Peak position
Australian Albums (ARIA)	18

== Release history ==
Region	Date	Format	Label	Catalogue
Australia	5 April 2013	CD; digital download	teamtrick	TEAM02

== Certifications ==
Region	Certification	Certified units/sales
Australia (ARIA)	Gold	35,000^{‡}
^{‡} Sales+streaming figures based on certification alone.
