= Startup Cult =

Studio album by Allday
- Released: 4 July 2014
- Recorded: 2012–2014
- Genre: Australian hip hop
- Length: 53:53
- Label: Onetwo
- Producers: M-Phazes; Quexxxt; Jord Levus; Gully Chaps; Hamley; Cam Bluff; One Above; Mikey Fresh; Tjuvjakt; Chuck Daly

Allday chronology
| Loners Are Cool (2013) | Startup Cult (2014) | Speeding (2017) |

Singles from Startup Cult
- 1. "Right Now" Released: 25 April 2014; 2. "Cult" Released: May 2014; 3. "You Always Know the DJ" Released: 12 September 2014; 4. "Wolves" Released: 9 November 2014

Startup Cult is the debut album by Australian rap artist Allday. It was released on 4 July 2014. It was released internationally via Wind-up Records on 18 September 2015. The album spawned four singles: "Right Now", "Cult", "You Always Know the DJ", and "Wolves" (featuring Sunni Colón).

== Singles ==
Allday released "Right Now" as the lead single from Startup Cult on 25 April 2014. The music video was released on his YouTube channel on 22 May 2014, it was directed and produced by Nima Navili Rad. "Right Now" peaked at number 69 on the ARIA charts on 6 May 2014.

"Cult" was released in May 2014 and peaked at number 97 on the ARIA charts.

The music video for "You Always Know the DJ" was released on 29 June 2014. A single of the song was later released on 12 September 2014, which included a remix by MD.

On 9 November 2014, Allday released the music video for "Wolves" featuring Sunni Colón confirming it as the fourth single from Startup Cult. He titled it "Allday - Wolves Ft. Sunni Colón (Official Video) (Ladies' Sun Hat Edition)", as a joke and reference to the white sunhat that he wore in some scenes of the video. The music video was directed by Hoodwolf.

== Promotion ==
As a part of the promotion for the worldwide release of Startup Cult, a video was released on 18 September 2015 to Gaynor's YouTube channel titled ""Allday - Startup Cult" Join The Cult September 18." The 48 second video previewed some songs from Startup Cult including "Clouds", "Got It", "Cult", "Wolves" as well as the single "Claude Monet", which did not appear on the LP. The video shows clips of Allday's music videos for "Right Now", "You Always Know the DJ", "Wolves", and "Claude Monet" and some clips of his performances. The video has Tom Gaynor (Allday) commentating between clips of his songs telling people to check out the album.

== Critical reception ==
Sam Murphy from Music Feeds gave a positive review of Startup Cult stating "Startup Cult works because it sounds genuine. Allday has constructed a sound that’s modern and on-trend, a believable, youthful and — beyond the occasional muscle-flex — humble narrative." Murphy also stated that; "The biggest inspiration on the record appears to be Drake." Libby Parker from Glam Adelaide also gave a positive review saying that "There's a lot of variety on the 15 track album and Allday's lyrics are often honest, raw and reflective of his youth." "Startup Cult isn't your typical hip hop album, it's laidback, melodic, hypnotic and meditative with lyrics that don't always match the music but will make you listen in to the narrative." Pointing out "You Always Know the DJ" as the best song from the album. Sally-Anne Hurley from The Music gave Startup Cult 3.5/5 stars saying that highlights of the album include "Wasting Time" and "God Starve The Queen" and that "it's hard to pick standouts when, overall, the album is pretty damn good."

== Track listing ==
| No. | Title | Writer(s) | Producer(s) | Length |
|---|---|---|---|---|
| 1. | "Got It" | Tom Gaynor, Toben Farrell | Quexxxt | 3:28 |
| 2. | "Fuckin" | Gaynor, Tom Stow | Jord Levus | 4:04 |
| 3. | "Right Now" | Gaynor, Chris Litten, Cameron Ludik, Charles Daly | Cam Bluff, Chuck Daly | 3:57 |
| 4. | "You Always Know the DJ" | Gaynor, Andrew Burford, Ludik | One Above | 3:38 |
| 5. | "Wolves" (Sunni Colón) | Gaynor, Mark Landon | M-Phazes | 4:26 |
| 6. | "Anything but Sober" | Gaynor, Cameron Chapman | Chaps | 3:21 |
| 7. | "Another Night at Windy Point" | Gaynor, Chapman | Chaps | 1:31 |
| 8. | "Hometown Pride" | Gaynor, James Hamley | Hamley | 4:27 |
| 9. | "Clouds" | Gaynor, Michael Keenan | Mikey Fresh | 3:17 |
| 10. | "Taking Hold" | Gaynor, Ludik | Bluff | 3:48 |
| 11. | "Miligrams" (featuring Stax Osset) | Gaynor, Hamley | Hamley | 1:21 |
| 12. | "God Starve the Queen" | Gaynor, Chapman, Charles Daly | Chaps | 3:44 |
| 13. | "Wasting Time" | Gaynor, Fedrik Eriksson, Ollie Grafström | WOODZ, Tjuvjakt | 5:35 |
| 14. | "Cult" | Gaynor, Daly, Tim Stow, | Levus | 3:23 |
| 15. | "Find Me" | Gaynor, Chapman | Chaps | 3:53 |

Notes

- "Right Now", "Wasting Time" and "You Always Know the DJ" feature uncredited vocals by Jimmy Davis.
- "Right Now" features uncredited vocals by Steph Carbone.
- "You Always Know the DJ" features uncredited vocals by Jimmy Davis.
- "Wasting Time" features uncredited vocals by Jimmy Davis
- "Clouds" features uncredited vocals by Jack Byrnes.
- "Taking Hold" features uncredited vocals by Megan Kent.
- "God Starve the Queen" features uncredited vocals by Nicole Millar.

== Charts ==
Startup Cult debuted at No. 3 in Australia in the week commencing 14 July 2014, behind Ed Sheeran and Sia. Startup Cult is the second top five album from Illy's label Onetwo (after Illy's Cinematic) reached No. 4 in November 2013, making Startup Cult ONETWO's highest charting album to date.

=== Weekly charts ===
| Chart (2014) | Peak position |
|---|---|
| Australian Albums (ARIA) | 3 |

=== Year-end charts ===
| Chart (2014) | Rank |
|---|---|
| Australian Artist Albums (ARIA) | 49 |

== Release history ==
| Region | Date | Format | Edition(s) | Label | Catalogue |
|---|---|---|---|---|---|
| Australia | 4 July 2014 | CD; digital download | Standard | ONETWO | ONETWO002 |
| Australia | 2015 | 2×LP | Standard | ONETWO | ONETWO002 |
