= Right Now (Allday song) =

Single by Allday

from the album Startup Cult
- Released: 25 April 2014
- Length: 3:57
- Label: OneTwo
- Songwriter(s): Tomas Gaynor; Chris Litten; Cameron Ludik; Charles Daly
- Producer(s): Cam Bluff; Chuck Daly

Allday singles chronology
"Claude Monet" (2013)	"Right Now" (2014)	"Cult" (2014)

Music video
- "Right Now" on YouTube

"Right Now" is a song by Australian rapper Allday, released on 25 April 2014 as the lead single from the Allday's debut studio album Startup Cult. The single peaked at number 69 on the ARIA Chart was certified gold in Australia in 2021.

== Music video ==
The Music video was released in May 2014 which Sam Price of Speaker TV thought "[the] touches of visual elegance softening the blow in the newly christened offering."

== Track listing ==
Digital download

1. "Right Now" – 3:57

== Charts ==
Chart (2014)	Peak Position
Australian (ARIA)	69

== Certifications ==
Region	Certification	Certified units/sales
Australia (ARIA)	Gold	35,000^{‡}
^{‡} Sales+streaming figures based on certification alone.
