= In Motion (Allday song) =

Single by Allday featuring Japanese Wallpaper

from the album Speeding
- Released: 17 March 2017
- Length: 3:43
- Songwriter(s): Tomas Henry Gaynor; Gabriel Strum

Allday singles chronology
| "Raceway" (2016) | "In Motion" (2017) | "UFO" (2018) |

Music video
- "In Motion" on YouTube

"In Motion" is a song by Australian rapper Allday featuring Japanese Wallpaper. It was released in March 2017 as the third and final single from the Allday's second studio album Speeding. The singles was certified gold in Australia in 2018.

== Track listing ==
Digital download

1. "In Motion" – 3:43

== Certifications ==
| Region | Certification | Certified units/sales |
|---|---|---|
| Australia (ARIA) | Platinum | 70,000^{‡} |
^{‡} Sales+streaming figures based on certification alone.
