= Do You Hear =

Single by Cub Scout

from the album Told You So
- Released: March 2012
- Length: 3:11
- Label: Cub Sport
- Songwriter(s): Tim Nelson

Cub Scout singles chronology
"Evie" (2011)	"Do You Hear" (2012)	"Told You So" (2012)

Music video
- "Do You Hear" on YouTube

"Do You Hear" is a song by Australian alt-pop group Cub Sport (then known as Cub Scouts), released in March 2012 as the second single from the group's second EP Told You So.

At the 2012 Queensland Music Awards, "Do You Hear" won Song of the Year and Pop Song of the Year.

== Music video ==
"Do You Hear"'s music video was released in April 2012. It was directed and produced by Sam Rogers and shows band members wearing prison jump suits and riding disability scooters around Brisbane.
