= Charlie (Mallrat song) =

2019 song by Mallrat

Single by Mallrat

from the EP Driving Music
- Released: 7 August 2019
- Length: 3:11
- Label: Dew Process
- Composer(s): Grace Shaw; Leroy Clampitt
- Producer(s): Big Taste

Mallrat singles chronology
"Nobody's Home" (2019)	"Charlie" (2019)	"Break Me Down" (2020)

Music video
- "Charlie" on YouTube

"Charlie" is a song by Australian musician Mallrat. It was released on 7 August 2019 as the lead single from Mallrat's third EP Driving Music. The song debuted at number 50 on the ARIA Charts in February 2020 after placing at number 3 in Triple J's Hottest 100 of 2019.

The song is named after Mallrat's beloved family dog, Charlie. Mallrat told Triple J "'Charlie' is about a lot of different things, but mostly just loving people so much, regardless of whether it's reciprocated or not."

In November 2019, Mallrat revealed that she had been asked to record a version of "Charlie" in the Simlish language for the upcoming addition in The Sims series.

== Music video ==
The video clip for "Charlie" was released on 6 August 2019 and directed by her friend Tim Hardy. It sees Mallrat riding her bike through the streets of Melbourne and gives the viewer a look inside her previous life. It also features Mallrat's father and family Labrador retriever Charlie, whom the song is named after.

== Reception ==
Nicole Almeida from Atwood Magazine said "'Charlie' is a declaration of love as much as it is a recipe for it. As Mallrat bares her soul to the person she loves, speaking about her feelings and family, she also tells them exactly what she looks for in a relationship. Or this might just be a song about how much she loves her dog, which makes it equally (if not more) as special. Regardless, on 'Charlie', Mallrat successfully shifts direction and proves that whether the song is made for dancing or crying to, her storytelling is her most uniquely powerful tool."

Tom Skinner from NME called the song an "emotional dreamy cut". Jackson Langford from Music Feeds called the song "absolutely stunning" and one that will be on repeat for months. In a review of the EP, Josh Leeson from Newcastle Herald described "Charlie" as the EP's "most beautiful moment".

== Charts ==
=== Weekly charts ===
Chart (2020)	Peak position
Australia (ARIA)	50
US Alternative Airplay (Billboard)	37

=== Year-end charts ===
Chart (2020)	Position
Australian Artist (ARIA)	36

== Certification ==
Region	Certification	Certified units/sales
Australia (ARIA)	Platinum	70,000^{‡}
^{‡} Sales+streaming figures based on certification alone.
