= Bats (album) =

Studio album by Cub Sport
- Released: 22 September 2017
- Studio: Union St Studios, (Melbourne); Fagan, (Brisbane)
- Genre: Alternative rock
- Length: 42:57
- Label: Cub Sport
- Producer: John Castle, Tim Nelson

Cub Sport chronology
This Is Our Vice (2016)	Bats (2017)	Cub Sport (2019)

Singles from Bats
- 1. "O Lord" Released: 30 June 2017; 2. "Chasin'" Released: 31 August 2017; 3. "Good Guys Go" Released: 19 January 2018

Bats is the second studio album by Australian alt-pop group Cub Sport, released on 22 September 2017. The album peaked at number 67 on the ARIA Charts.

Upon release lead singer Tim Nelson said the album is “inspired by personal experiences of growth, disappointment, self-doubt, partying, learning to accept and trust myself, coming out and falling in love”.

The album was supported by a national tour.

== Reception ==
Professional ratings
Review scores
Source	Rating
The Interns	4/5 stars
Beat Magazine	9/10 stars

The album received generally positive reviews from critics. Sam Murphy from The Interns said "From the music to the lyrics, it's an album that tackles things honestly and earnestly. There are few bands in this country who are as good a lyricists as Cub Sport are right now while still delivering a sonic backing that's endearing and entertaining. Bats is a personal and artistic triumph."

Paul Waxman from Beat Magazine said the band "…usher in a remarkable blend of lyrical openness with sinister instrumental undertones. Delivering a unique pop album experience, Bats is a tropical yet eerie collection of songs that'll make you dance as much as it makes you feel".

Thomas Bleach said "Bats is an emotional record that sees lead vocalist Tim Nelson exploring the different stages of coming to terms with his sexuality. From the first realisation to accepting who he is to coming out and then to falling in love. It's a reflective empowering and comforting recount that is going to resonate well with anyone who has been through or is currently going through similar feelings."

== Track listing ==
No.	Title	Writer(s)	Length
1.	"Chasin'"	Tim Nelson	3:12
2.	"Good Guys Go"	Nelson	3:36
3.	"O Lord"	Nelson	3:54
4.	"Hawaiian Party"	Nelson	4:03
5.	"Let U B"	Liam McGorry; Nelson	2:26
6.	"Bats"	Nelson	3:33
7.	"Give It to Me (Like You Mean It)"	Sarah Blasko; Nelson	2:52
8.	"Look After Me"	McGorry; Nelson	3:30
9.	"Crush"	Nelson	2:27
10.	"Temporarily"	Nelson	3:02
11.	"Solo III"	Nelson	3:51
12.	"Banyo Blue"	Nelson; Sam Netterfield	3:48
13.	"Jellybean’s Graduation Song"	Nelson	2:43

== Charts ==
Chart (2017)	Peak position
Australian Albums (ARIA)	67

== Release history ==
Region	Date	Format	Label	Catalogue	Ref.
Australia	22 September 2017	CD; digital download; Vinyl; streaming	Cub Sport	CUB004 / CUB004V	
