= This Is Our Vice =

Studio album by Cub Sport
- Released: 4 March 2016
- Studios: The Shed, Melbourne; Fagan, Brisbane
- Genre: Alternative rock
- Length: 37:16
- Label: Cub Sport
- Producer: John Castle

Cub Sport chronology
Paradise (2013)	This Is Our Vice (2016)	Bats (2017)

Singles from This Is Our Vice
- 1. "Only Friend" Released: 9 October 2015; 2. "I Can't Save You" Released: 20 January 2016; 3. "Come On Mess Me Up" Released: August 2016

This Is Our Vice is the debut studio album by Australian alt-pop group Cub Sport, released on 4 March 2016.

Upon release, the group said "This Is Our Vice is an honest musical expression of some of the most defining experiences for us over the last couple of years. When creating this album, we wanted to go deeper than we had with previous Cub Sport releases. Our EPs earned us a reputation for making upbeat, catchy music and I guess one of our goals for the album was to create music that was still catchy and upbeat, but to marry up those qualities with with(sic) lyrics that are genuine and meaningful. Our hope is that these songs resonate with people and connect in a meaningful way. We've grown up a lot and we wanted this album to be a reflection of that."

They supported the album by playing a series of shows in Australia, the United Kingdom and United States before returning to Australia for the group’s first headline tour in over three years commencing in August 2016.

In April 2021, the album was re-released on limited edition transparent vinyl to celebrate its fifth year anniversary, which included two bonus tracks. The album entered and peak on the ARIA charts at number 55.

== Reception ==
Professional ratings
Review scores
Source	Rating
AllMusic	3.5/5 stars
Beat Magazine	3/4 stars

Neil Z. Yeung from AllMusic said: "The debut LP from Australia's Cub Sport brims with youthful spirit and catchy melodies", adding "With more electronic flourishes and a funkier vibe than their past efforts, the album shimmers, injecting tropical dance elements into its indie rock backbone."

Tegan Reeves from Beat Magazine said: "After bursting out of Brisbane's thriving indie pop scene way back in 2012, the four-piece took some time off to record, and the result is a release that eloquently expresses the notion of coming of age". Reeves added "All in all, the album is a strong offering, and shows a new maturity to Cub Sport's musical direction. This Is Our Vice is a delight, and proves that taking time to get it right has paid off."

Zanda Wilson from Music Feeds wrote: "It's immediately clear that the band have brought a new maturity and intensity to their sound, whilst still staying true to aspects like super clean production and infectious melodies that they established in their early work" adding "Tim Nelson’s vocals are a standout from track one, and they are featured in a variety of ways across several different kinds of tune throughout the album."

== Track listing ==
All tracks are written by Tim Nelson.

No.	Title	Length
1.	"Sun"	3:07
2.	"I Can't Save You"	3:16
3.	"It Kills Me"	3:35
4.	"Come On Mess Me Up"	3:23
5.	"I'm on Fire"	4:05
6.	"Only Friend"	3:00
7.	"Runner"	3:21
8.	"I Don't Love My Baby"	3:22
9.	"I Feel Bad Now"	3:22
10.	"Vice"	3:59
11.	"Stay"	3:10

iTunes bonus tracks
No.	Title	Length
12.	"Simmer"	4:06
13.	"Space"	3:21

2021 Vinyl bonus tracks
No.	Title	Length
12.	"Future"

== Charts ==
Chart performance for This Is Our Vice
Chart (2021)	Peak position
Australian Albums (ARIA)	55

== Release history ==
Release history and formats for This Is Our Vice
Region	Date	Format	Label	Catalogue	Ref.
Australia	4 March 2016	CD; digital download; vinyl	Cub Sport	CUB003	
United States	4 March 2016	CD; digital download; vinyl	Nettwerk	067003108911	
Australia	2 April 2021	Limited edition transparent vinyl	Cub Sport	CUB003V3	
