= Loon Lake (band) =

Australian indie rock band

Loon Lake was an indie rock band based in Melbourne, consisting of brothers Sam Nolan (lead vocals, guitar), Simon Nolan (guitar, vocals), and Nick Nolan (guitars, production), as well as Tim Lowe (bass), and Ricky Birmingham (drums).

The band released two EPs, 2011's Not Just Friends and 2012's Thirty Three, the latter of which saw single "Cherry Lips" peak at No. 19 on the ARIA Australian Artists Singles Chart. In 2013, Loon Lake was named one of Triple J magazine's "50 Acts that Matter Right Now". The band released their debut album, Gloamer, on 11 October 2013. They self-released their second and final studio album Low Res in October 2015.

The band announced in August 2015 that they would disband at the conclusion of their Final Wave Tour, which ended in November 2015.

== History ==
=== Background ===
The Nolan brothers grew up in Tarrawingee, a small town in Country Victoria, Australia. Nick Nolan is a lifelong friend of bassist Tim Lowe, who also grew up in Tarrawingee. Sam Nolan met guitarist Daniel Bull while traveling in Turkey. Sam came up with the band's name while reading E. L. Doctorow's Loon Lake in a Costa Rican café during his travels.

Loon Lake's early demos "Into the Office" and "Easy Chairs", recorded in Melbourne in 2011, were praised by the Australian blogosphere and by Triple J critics Richard Kingsmill and Zan Rowe for their "killer riffs, total heart, and down to earth stories."

In 2011, Loon Lake toured with Girls, Kaiser Chiefs, Cage the Elephant, The Grates, Jebediah and more. These support tours were followed by the band's first national headlining tour named the Not Just Friends tour, on which they sold out iconic Melbourne venues Northcote Social club and Ding Dong Lounge.

=== Not Just Friends EP (2011) ===
Loon Lake's first EP Not Just Friends was mixed by Robin Mae (Nick Cave, John Butler Trio) and released on 3 June 2011. "Easy Chairs" and "In the Summer", two of Not Just Friends' standout tracks, were placed into rotation on several Australian radio stations including RRR FM, FBI Radio Sydney, 4zzz Brisbane, and Triple J. Beat Magazine said of the EP, "Loon Lake's EP comprises six hook-laden tracks which explode with power pop guitars, off kilter vocals, and a couple of high notes here and there leaving a raw sincerity resonating from every infectious raucous riff."

=== Thirty Three EP (2012) ===
The Thirty Three EP is best known for its second single "Cherry Lips", a song that became the band's highest charting single to date after reaching No. 29 on the Triple J Hottest 100 in early 2013, and No. 5 on the Australian Independent Record Label Association's Independent Singles Chart. The first single from Thirty Three, "Bad to Me", reached No. 2 on the AIR chart and No. 9 on the iTunes alternative chart.

Faster Louder's Natalie Silvo said of the EP, "the execution and the underlying promises of unabashed fun ensures that that Loon Lake will provide a solid soundtrack to warmer days and nights." The EP was also considered to be the band's most diverse effort to date, with Loon Lake guitarist Dan Bull saying in an interview with X-Press Magazine, "These songs are a result of us maybe finding our sound, and experimenting with different arrangements and styles."

Loon Lake toured in support of this EP, playing many of Australia's marquee venues and even selling out the Corner Hotel two weeks beforehand.

=== Gloamer (2013) ===
Loon Lake's first full-length album, Gloamer, was released via Caroline / Universal on 11 October 2013. The album's title is derived from the word "gloaming", which describes someone coming to life during the time of day after the sun goes down, but before darkness falls. Two singles were released from Gloamer: "On Fire" on 1 March 2013, and "Carolina" on 16 August 2013. "City Lights", released in January 2013, was later included on the album.

== Band members ==
- Sam Nolan – lead vocals, guitar (2009–2015)
- Simon Nolan – guitar, vocals (2009–2015)
- Nick Nolan – guitar, vocals (2015), drums, production (2009–2015)
- Tim Lowe – bass (2009–2015)
- Ricky – drums, production (2015)
- Daniel Bull – guitar, vocals (2009–2015)
- Daniel Hurley - guitar (2012-2012)

== Discography ==
=== Albums ===
- Gloamer (11 October 2013, Caroline / Universal)
- Low Res (20 October 2015, self-released)

=== EPs ===
- Not Just Friends (2011, self-released)
- Thirty Three (2012, self-released)

=== Singles ===
- "In the Summer" (2011)
- "Bad to Me" (2011)
- "Cherry Lips" (2012)
- "City Lights" (2013)
- "Carolina" (2013)
- "On Fire" (2013)
- "Surfin'" (2015)
- "Just Now" (2015)
- "Radiator" (2015)

== Concert tours ==
=== Headlining ===
- The ‘Not Just Friends’ Tour (2011)
- The ‘Thirty Three’ Tour (2012)
- Loon Lake Australian Tour (2013)
- The Good Times Tour (2014)
- The Final Wave Tour (2015)

=== Festivals ===
- Pyramid Music Festival (2011)
- Falls Festival (2012)
- Big Day Out Melbourne (2012, 2014)
- Groovin' the Moo Bendigo (2012)
- Queenscliff Music Festival (2013)
- Southbound Festival (2013)

Loon Lake also completed many national support tours with artists including Ball Park Music, Bluejuice, Kaiser Chiefs, Girls, and Cage the Elephant.
