= Groceries (song) =

Single by Mallrat

from the EP In the Sky
- Released: 1 June 2018
- Length: 3:37
- Label: Dew Process
- Songwriter(s): Grace Shaw; Konstantin Kersting
- Producer(s): Konstantin Kersting

Mallrat singles chronology
"UFO" (2018)	"Groceries" (2018)	"Nobody's Home" (2019)

Music video
- "Groceries" on YouTube

"Groceries" is a song by Australian musician Mallrat. It was released in June 2018 as the third single from Mallrat's second EP In the Sky. The song peaked at number 58 on the ARIA Charts and was certified platinum in Australia.

The song was voted number 7 on the Triple J Hottest 100, 2018.

Mallrat told Happy Mag the song is "about having a crush but not wanting to have a crush on someone. Being like, this is so annoying, I don't want this. I love being independent, so when you really like someone it can be annoying."

== Reception ==
AIRIT called "Groceries" "a heavenly pop hymn" saying "Its cascading vocal melodies, snappy beats, lovesick lyrics, and a chorus that will have set up a home in your heart well before you even finish the first play through."

== Track listing ==
Digital download

1. "Groceries" – 3:37

== Charts ==
Chart (2019)	Position
Australia Singles (ARIA)	57

=== Year-end charts ===
Chart (2019)	Position
Australian Artist (ARIA)	27

== Certifications ==
Region	Certification	Certified units/sales
Australia (ARIA)	3× Platinum	210,000^{‡}
^{‡} Sales+streaming figures based on certification alone.
