= Chasin' =

Single by Cub Sport

from the album Bats
- Released: 31 August 2017
- Label: Cub Sport
- Songwriter(s): Tim Nelson
- Producer(s): John Castle, Tim Nelson

Cub Sport singles chronology
"O Lord" (2017)	"Chasin'" (2017)	"Good Guys Go" (2018)

Music video
- "Chasin'" on YouTube

"Chasin'" is a song by Australian alt-pop group Cub Sport, released in 31 August 2017 as the second single from the group's second studio album Bats. The song was certified gold in Australia in early 2020.

The track was written by frontman Tim and in a statement Nelson said "Chasin' is the opening track off our new album BATS and it's sort of the start of the whole story. In the middle of 2015 I went on a writing trip to LA and London. I was enjoying the creative process, but I was sad for most of my time away because I missed my best friend/band mate Bolan (Sam). It just made me realise that I was in love with him, which was equal parts exciting and distressing. I wrote Chasin' just after I got home from that trip. I feel like it ties together all of the feelings I had during that time."

== Music video ==
The music video was released on 19 October 2017. It was directed by Jennifer Embelton. Eleanor Pettipher from Fortitude Magazine said "Traditional masculine gender roles have been turned on their head with the band portraying a soft, fluid side to their nature. The main themes of florals, gentle dusk light and the beauty of nature come together cleanly and effortlessly. It's a subtle and understated backdrop that compliments [sic] the dreamlike qualities of the track." Zoë Radas from Stack Magazine called it "a gorgeous clip for a gorgeous song."

== Reception ==
Professional ratings
Review scores
Source	Rating
Fortitude Magazine	7/10 stars

Eleanor Pettipher from Fortitude Magazine said "Chasin' is stripped back with a dreamlike quality allowing the rawness of the lyrics to shine through. Tim Nelson's crisp vocal gains an ethereal quality when coupled with the smooth, enchanting synths, needing no other accompaniment. The track opens with the ode 'I don’t even know what I want out of life, what I'm chasing', moving on to question what love is and what lengths we should go to in pursuit of it. After the progressive build-up the electronic beat kicks in with a slightly off-kilter edge that frames Tim's vocal beautifully."

== Certifications ==
Region	Certification	Certified units/sales
Australia (ARIA)	Gold	35,000^{‡}
^{‡} Sales+streaming figures based on certification alone.
