= Mallrat =

Australian pop musician (born 1998)

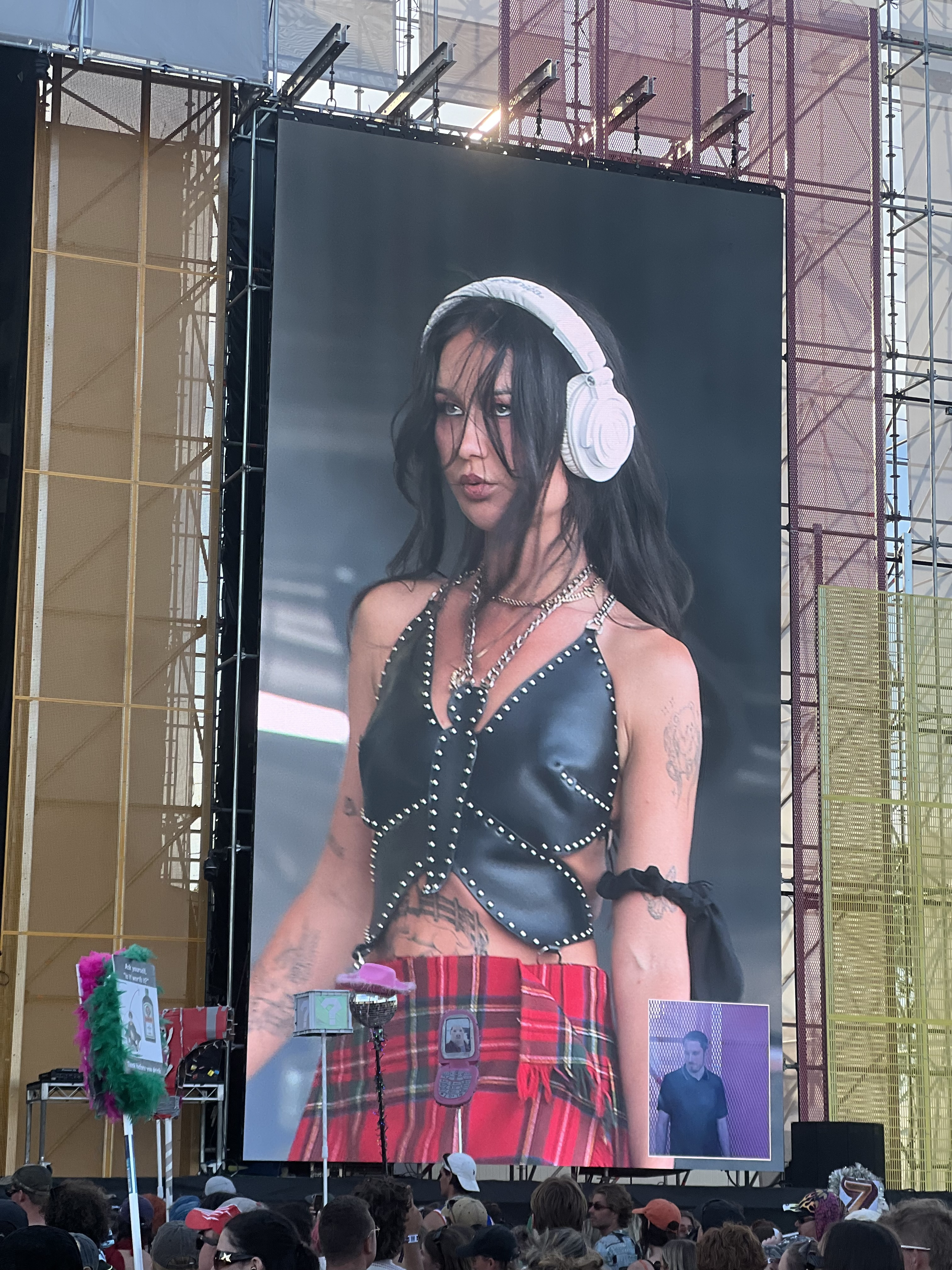

Background information
- Born: Grace Kathleen Elizabeth Shaw; 25 September 1998 (age 28); Brisbane, Queensland, Australia
- Genres: Electronica; hip hop; indie pop
- Occupations: Musician; singer; songwriter; producer
- Years active: 2015–present
- Labels: Create Control; Dew Process; Nettwerk
- Website: lilmallrat.com

Grace Kathleen Elizabeth Shaw (born 25 September 1998), known professionally as Mallrat, is an Australian musician, singer, and rapper from Brisbane. Mallrat has released three EPs: Uninvited (2016), In the Sky (2018) and Driving Music (2019). She also released her full-length debut studio album titled Butterfly Blue (2022), followed by her ARIA charting sophomore album Light hit my face like a straight right (2025). In 2019, her tracks "Groceries" and "UFO" placed at number 7 and 70, respectively, in the 2018 Triple J Hottest 100, in 2020, "Charlie" and "Nobody's Home" placed at number 3 and 59, respectively, in the 2019 Triple J Hottest 100 and in 2021, "Rockstar" placed 13 in the 2020 Triple J Hottest 100.

== Early life ==
Grace Kathleen Elizabeth Shaw was born on 25 September 1998, in Brisbane. She attended Ascot State School from 2004 to 2010 and Clayfield College from 2011 to 2015. Shaw began writing music as a high school student, as she started making music when she was 11 years old, first releasing music in 2014.

== Music career ==
=== 2015–2016: Early years ===
The name 'Mallrat' is derived from the 2012 track "Mallrats (La La La)" by American punk band the Orwells. Shaw released her official debut single, "Suicide Blonde", under the name Mallrat on 23 July 2015. This single would later be included on her debut EP, Uninvited, which she recorded while in her last year of high school.

=== 2017–2021: Signing onto labels, In the Sky and Driving Music ===
Mallrat performed at Splendour in the Grass in 2017, and alongside artists such as Peking Duk and Allday. She then signed on with Canadian label Nettwerk Records and Australian label Dew Process. In early 2017, Mallrat supported Peking Duk on their 'Clowntown' tour. In October 2017, Mallrat released her single "Better" followed by "UFO" featuring Allday in February 2018 and "Groceries" in June 2018. All three tracks featured on her second EP, In the Sky which was released in June 2018. In 2018–2019, Mallrat supported Maggie Rogers in Europe on her 'Heard It In A Past Life' World Tour. In January 2019, Mallrat announced her headline national tour with Basenji, Kota Banks, and Nyne as supports. Later that month "Groceries" and "UFO" placed at number 7 and 70, respectively, in the 2018 Triple J Hottest 100.

In August 2019, Mallrat released "Charlie" the lead single from her third EP Driving Music which was released in September 2019. The EP peaked at number 10 on the ARIA Charts. In December 2019, NME included "Uninvited", a song from the 2016 album Uninvited, as one of the greatest songs of the 2010s decade, at number 91. In January 2020, "Charlie" and "Nobody's Home" featuring Basenji placed at number 3 and 59, respectively, in the 2019 Triple J Hottest 100. In January 2021, Mallrat's single "Rockstar" placed 13 in the 2020 Triple J Hottest 100.

=== 2022-2023: Butterfly Blue ===
On 4 February 2022 Mallrat released "Your Love". On 2 March 2022, Mallrat released "Teeth" and announced the release of her debut studio album, Butterfly Blue. The album peaked at number 6 on the ARIA Charts. In June 2023 she released a song with New Zealand artist Benee called "Do It Again", which is serving as the official song of the 2023 FIFA Women's World Cup.

=== 2025: Light Hit My Face Like a Straight Right ===
In December 2024, Mallrat announced her second album Light Hit My Face Like a Straight Right. It was released on 14 February 2025. It debuted at #1 on the ARIA Australian Album Charts. The release was accompanied by an international tour spanning the United States of America, Canada, the United Kingdom, Ireland, Slovenia, Czech Republic, France, Germany, Netherlands, Scotland, Australia and New Zealand, with majority of shows selling out. Mallrat also supported Kylie Minogue on her Tension Tour across Australia and MARINA on her Princess of Power Tour Across North America in Fall.

Mallrat was also featured on a remix of Spacey Janes Estimated Delivery, released October 2025.

== Musical style ==
Mallrat's musical influences are genre spanning, taking inspiration from artists like SOPHIE, Lana Del Rey, Lorde, Three 6 Mafia, and country icons such as Dolly Parton. Mallrat also draws heavily from folk music, which she says is her biggest influence.

== Discography ==
=== Studio albums ===
Title	Details	Peak chart positions
Title	Details	AUS
Butterfly Blue	Released: 13 May 2022; Label: Dew Process; Format: Digital download, streaming, CD, LP	6
Light Hit My Face Like a Straight Right	Released: 14 February 2025; Label: Dew Process // Nettwerk; Format: Digital download, streaming, CD, LP	35

=== Extended plays ===
Title	Details	Peak chart positions
Title	Details	AUS
Uninvited	Released: 1 July 2016; Label: Create Control; Format: Digital download, streaming	—
In the Sky	Released: 1 June 2018; Label: Dew Process, Nettwerk; Format: Digital download, streaming, CD	—
Driving Music	Released: 6 September 2019; Label: Dew Process, Universal Australia; Format: Digital download, streaming, CD	10

=== Singles ===
==== As lead artist ====
List of singles as lead artist, with year released and album details shown
Title	Year	Peak chart positions	Certifications	Album
Title	Year	AUS	Certifications	Album
"Sunglasses"	2015	—		Uninvited
"Suicide Blonde"	2016	—		Uninvited
"Inside Voices"	2016	—		Uninvited
"Uninvited"	2016	—		Uninvited
"Tokyo Drift"	2016	—		Uninvited
"For Real"	2016	—		Uninvited
"Better"	2017	—	ARIA: Platinum	In the Sky
"UFO" (featuring Allday)	2018	—	ARIA: Gold	In the Sky
"Groceries"	2018	57	ARIA: 3× Platinum	In the Sky
"Nobody's Home" (with Basenji)	2019	—	ARIA: Platinum	Non-album single
"Charlie"	2019	50	ARIA: Platinum	Driving Music
"Break Me Down" (with Cub Sport; Northeast Party House remix)	2020	—		Like Nirvana
"Rockstar"	2020	—	ARIA: Gold	Butterfly Blue
"Your Love"	2022	—		Butterfly Blue
"Teeth"	2022	—		Butterfly Blue
"Surprise Me" (featuring Azealia Banks)	2022	—		Butterfly Blue
"Wish on an Eyelash Pt. 2" (with The Chainsmokers)	2022	—		Non-album single
"Cut Me Down" (with Blu DeTiger)	2023	—		TBA
"Ray of Light"	2024			Light Hit My Face Like a Straight Right
"Hocus Pocus" (with Kito)	2024	—		Light Hit My Face Like a Straight Right
"Horses"	2024	—		Light Hit My Face Like a Straight Right
"Pavement"	2025	—		Light Hit My Face Like a Straight Right
"Hideaway"	2025	—		Light Hit My Face Like a Straight Right
"Radio"	2025	—		Non-album singles
"Hold Close" (with Kito and jamesjamesjames)	2025	—		Non-album singles

==== As featured artist ====
List of singles as featured artist, with year released and album shown
Title	Year	Album
"Get Money!" (E^ST featuring Mallrat)	2016	Get Money!
"Rush Hour" (Oh Boy featuring Mallrat)	2017	Non-album single
"Shoulders" (Golden Vessel featuring Elkkle and Mallrat)	2017	Right/Side
"littlebitwild" (Golden Vessel featuring Mallrat)	2020	colt
"R U High" (The Knocks featuring Mallrat)	2021	Non-album single
"Do It Again" (BENEE featuring Mallrat)	2023	2023 FIFA Women's World Cup
"Broke My Heart" (Alice Ivy featuring Mallrat and Jelani Blackman)	2023	Do What Makes You Happy

=== Other charted songs ===
Title	Year	Peak chart positions	Album
Title	Year	NZ Hot	Album
"To You"	2022	37	Butterfly Blue

=== Other appearances ===
List of non-single featured appearances
Title	Year	Album
"Bunny Island" (Oh Boy and Donatachi featuring Mallrat)	2016	Good Enuff 002 – Konpachi
"Baby Spiders" (Allday featuring Mallrat)	2017	Speeding
"Ultramarine" (Allday featuring Mallrat)	2017	Speeding
"Video" (Cub Sport featuring Mallrat)	2019	Cub Sport
"Break Me Down" (Cub Sport featuring Mallrat)	2020	Like Nirvana
"Simpatico" (Kate Miller-Heidke featuring Mallrat)	2020	Child in Reverse
"Winter" (Benee featuring Mallrat)	2020	Hey U X

== Awards and nominations ==
=== APRA Awards ===
The APRA Awards are several award ceremonies run in Australia by the Australasian Performing Right Association (APRA) to recognise composing and song writing skills, sales and airplay performance by its members annually.

Year	Nominee / work	Award	Result	Ref.
2020	"Charlie" by Mallrat (with Leroy Clampitt)	Song of the Year	Shortlisted	
2021	Grace Shaw p.k.a. Mallrat	Breakthrough Songwriter of the Year	Nominated	
2026	"Hideaway" (Grace Shaw / Styalz Fuego / Gab Strum)	Most Performed Alternative Work	Nominated	

=== ARIA Music Awards ===
The ARIA Music Awards is an annual awards ceremony across all genres of Australian music. Mallrat has received four nominations.

Year	Nominee / work	Award	Result
2020	Driving Music	Breakthrough Artist – Release	Nominated
2020	"Charlie"	Song of the Year	Nominated
2025	Light Hit My Face Like a Straight Right	Best Pop Release	Nominated
2025	Light Hit My Face Like a Straight Right	Best Solo Artist	Nominated

=== J Awards ===
The J Awards are an annual series of Australian music awards that were established by the Australian Broadcasting Corporation's youth-focused radio station Triple J. They commenced in 2005.

Year	Nominee / work	Award	Result	Ref.
2025	Light Hit My Face Like a Straight Right	Australian Album of the Year	Nominated	

=== MTV Europe Music Awards ===
The MTV Europe Music Awards is an award presented by Viacom International Media Networks to honour artists and music in pop culture.

Year	Nominee / work	Award	Result
2019	Herself	Best Australian Act	Nominated

=== National Live Music Awards ===
The National Live Music Awards (NLMAs) are a broad recognition of Australia's diverse live industry, celebrating the success of the Australian live scene. The awards commenced in 2016.

Year	Nominee / work	Award	Result
2019	Mallrat	Live Pop Act of the Year	Nominated
2020	Mallrat	Queensland Act Voice of the Year	Nominated

=== Queensland Music Awards ===
The Queensland Music Awards (previously known as Q Song Awards) are annual awards celebrating Queensland, Australia's brightest emerging artists and established legends. They commenced in 2006.

Year	Nominee / work	Award	Result (wins only)	Ref.
2025	Tom Carroll for "Hocus Pocus" by Mallrat	Video Award	Won	
2026	Mallrat	Producer of the Year	Won	

=== South Australian Music Awards ===
The South Australian Music Awards (previously known as the Fowler's Live Music Awards) are annual awards that exist to recognise, promote and celebrate excellence in the South Australian contemporary music industry. They commenced in 2012.

Year	Nominee / work	Award	Result (wins only)
2017	"Better" (Directed by Rory Pippan – Young Black Youth)	Best Music Video	Won

=== Vanda & Young Global Songwriting Competition ===
The Vanda & Young Global Songwriting Competition is an annual competition that "acknowledges great songwriting whilst supporting and raising money for Nordoff-Robbins" and is coordinated by Albert Music and APRA AMCOS. It commenced in 2009.

Year	Nominee / work	Award	Result
2018	"Better"	Unpublished prize	Won
