= Kllo =

Australian electro-pop duo

- Also known as: Klo
- Origin: Melbourne, Australia
- Genre: Electro-pop
- Years active: 2014–present
- Labels: Different; Dot Dash; Ghostly International; Good Manners
- Members: Chloe Kaul; Simon Lam
- Website: kllo.co

Kllo (pronounced "Kl-oh"), formerly known as Klo, is an Australian electro-pop duo from Melbourne, consisting of vocalist Chloe Kaul and producer Simon Lam.

== History ==
As a child, Chloe Kaul wrote songs with an acoustic guitar, and she began recording them in her early teens. Kaul's older cousin, Simon Lam, went to college for jazz drumming, later becoming interested in electronic music. At the suggestion of Lam's mother, he began making music with Kaul.

The duo's debut EP, Cusp, was released in 2014. The follow-up EP, Well Worn, came out in 2016. They issued the first full-length album, Backwater, in 2017. At Metacritic, it received an average score of 76 out of 100, based on 8 reviews, indicating "generally favorable reviews". The duo released their second studio album, Maybe We Could, in 2020. At Metacritic, ot received an average score of 65 out of 100, based on 4 reviews, indicating "generally favorable reviews".

== Members ==
- Chloe Kaul – vocals, keyboards
- Simon Lam – keyboards, production

== Discography ==
=== Studio albums ===
Title	Details
Backwater	Released: 20 October 2017; Label: Different • Ghostly International; Formats: CD, LP, digital download, streaming
Maybe We Could	Released: 17 July 2020; Label: Ghostly International • Good Manners • Plancha (Japan); Formats: CD, LP, digital download, streaming

=== EPs ===
Title	Details
Cusp	Released: 14 November 2014; Label: Dot Dash; Formats: CD, digital download, streaming
Well Worn	Released: 5 August 2016; Label: Ghostly International; Formats: CD, digital download, streaming, 12-inch vinyl

Singles

- "Potential" (2018)
- "Candid" (2018)
- "Back to You" (2019)
- "Only Existence" / "Final" (2020)
- "Affection" (2023)
