= Allday =

Australian rapper, singer (born 1991)

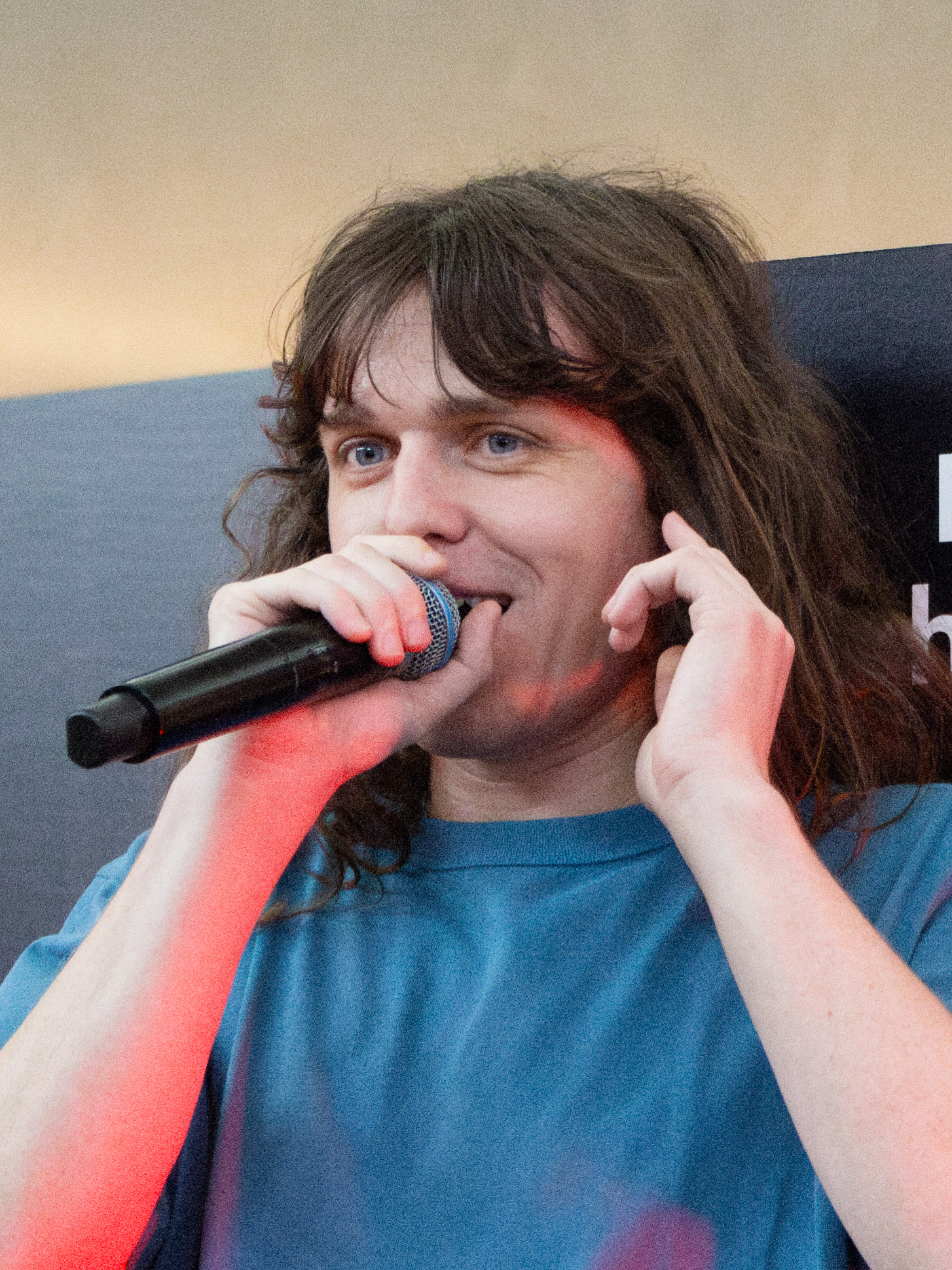
- Allday in 2023

Background information
- Born: Tomas Henry Gaynor; 21 February 1991 (age 35)
- Origin: Adelaide, South Australia
- Genres: Alternative hip-hop; indie pop
- Occupations: Rapper; singer; songwriter
- Instruments: Vocals; guitar
- Years active: 2011–present
- Labels: OneTwo; Wind-up
- Website: www.alldaytunes.com

Tomas Henry Gaynor (born 21 February 1991), known professionally as Allday, is an Australian rapper, singer and songwriter from Adelaide. Gaynor became active in 2011, when he began uploading his music for free online. Following his works becoming increasingly popular, he moved to Melbourne, to pursue a serious career before later relocating to Los Angeles in February 2017. His works have been influenced by acts such as Silverchair, Frank Ocean, and TLC. Gaynor released his debut album, Startup Cult, in July 2014 to Australian audiences. Startup Cult achieved success and reached number three on the ARIA Charts.

== Early life ==
Gaynor grew up in the Adelaide suburb of Blackwood. He was raised Catholic and attended Blackwood High School and Mercedes College (Adelaide). Gaynor played in a short-lived punk band in high school, which generated his interest in music. In 2011 Gaynor said "I basically grew up in the hip hop scene; I would have been about 11 years old when I went to my first show." In his youth, he had jobs at a pie shop, a pizza shop and Nando's. Gaynor started writing music at 11 years old but, due to a lack of equipment, he did not begin recording his music until he was 18.

== Career ==
=== 2011–2013: Career beginnings and mixtapes ===
Gaynor began producing works under the name Allday in 2011. The name "Allday" came about from a supermarket trip after Gaynor had smoked marijuana where he took a long time to choose a Tiny Teddy flavour.

In September 2011, Allday released his free for download debut mixtape Noue Yesue (pronounced "no-way yes-way"). It was followed by Soon I'll Be in Cali.

Gaynor also tried pursuing stand-up comedy at the time; he was a runner-up in the Raw Comedy national final in 2011. Gaynor moved to Melbourne in February 2012. He began a screenwriting course but dropped out to focus on music.

On 3 May 2012, Allday released A Skateboard Soirée for free on his Bandcamp. A Skateboard Soirée received nationwide airplay on Triple J and earned him and producer C1 "Unearthed Artist of the Week" honours. The single "So Good" was released, and peaked at number 91 on the Triple J Hottest 100, 2012.

In December 2012 Allday released his fourth free for download mixtape, Euphoria. The mixtape features production from C1, Soul Marauder, Savo and Woodz from Sweden.

In April 2013, Allday released his debut EP, Loners Are Cool, which peaked at number 18 on the ARIA Charts. In July 2013, Allday released his fifth free for download mixtape, Soon I'll Be in Cali 2.

=== 2014–2015: OneTwo Records, Loners Are Cool and Startup Cult ===
In December 2013, Allday signed with OneTwo Records and released "Claude Monet".

He went on a national tour of Australia in May and June 2014. Labelled the Right Now National Tour, he held concerts in Western Australia, South Australia, Victoria, New South Wales and Queensland. His debut album to be released in-stores nationally was Startup Cult in July 2014, which a week after its release reached number 3 on the ARIA Albums Chart. It was supported by a headlining tour around Australia. In December 2014 he released the single "Wolves" featuring Sunni Colón. He featured on Tasmanian singer Asta's song "Dynamite" in 2015.

In July 2015, Allday released another mixtape titled Soft Grunge Love Rap. Allday said "This is a mixtape I made really quick because my album is taking forever and I wanted to put some new songs out." A single "Grammy" was released.

In 2015, he was featured on the Troye Sivan song "For Him." on his album Blue Neighbourhood, which was released 4 December 2015.

=== 2016–2017: Speeding ===
On 23 June 2016—after a delay from his new label, Wind Up Records—Allday released "Monster Truck", which was produced by Cam Bluff, one of his frequent collaborators. On 15 July 2016 he released the lead single from his upcoming second album, the single was premiered on Triple J and is called "Sides" (featuring Nyne). He later released the single "Send Nudes" on 24 August 2016 which hit the top ten on the iTunes hip-hop charts. He released his fourth single of 2016 on 15 December, titled "Raceway". In March 2017, Allday announced his second studio album, titled Speeding, and released a third single "In Motion", with fellow Australian producer Japanese Wallpaper. The album was released on April 21, 2017. He toured his album Speeding around regional Australia with Arno Faraji and Kinder as supports. In 2017, Gaynor moved to Los Angeles.

=== 2018–2019: Starry Night Over the Phone ===
In November 2018, Allday released "Wonder Drug", the lead single from his third studio album. The album, titled Starry Night Over the Phone, was released on 12 July 2019, peaked at #7 in Australia; becoming his third top ten album. Gaynor returned to Melbourne in 2019 to renew his visa, but stayed after meeting his girlfriend and due to the COVID-19 pandemic.

=== 2020–2023: Drinking with My Smoking Friends ===
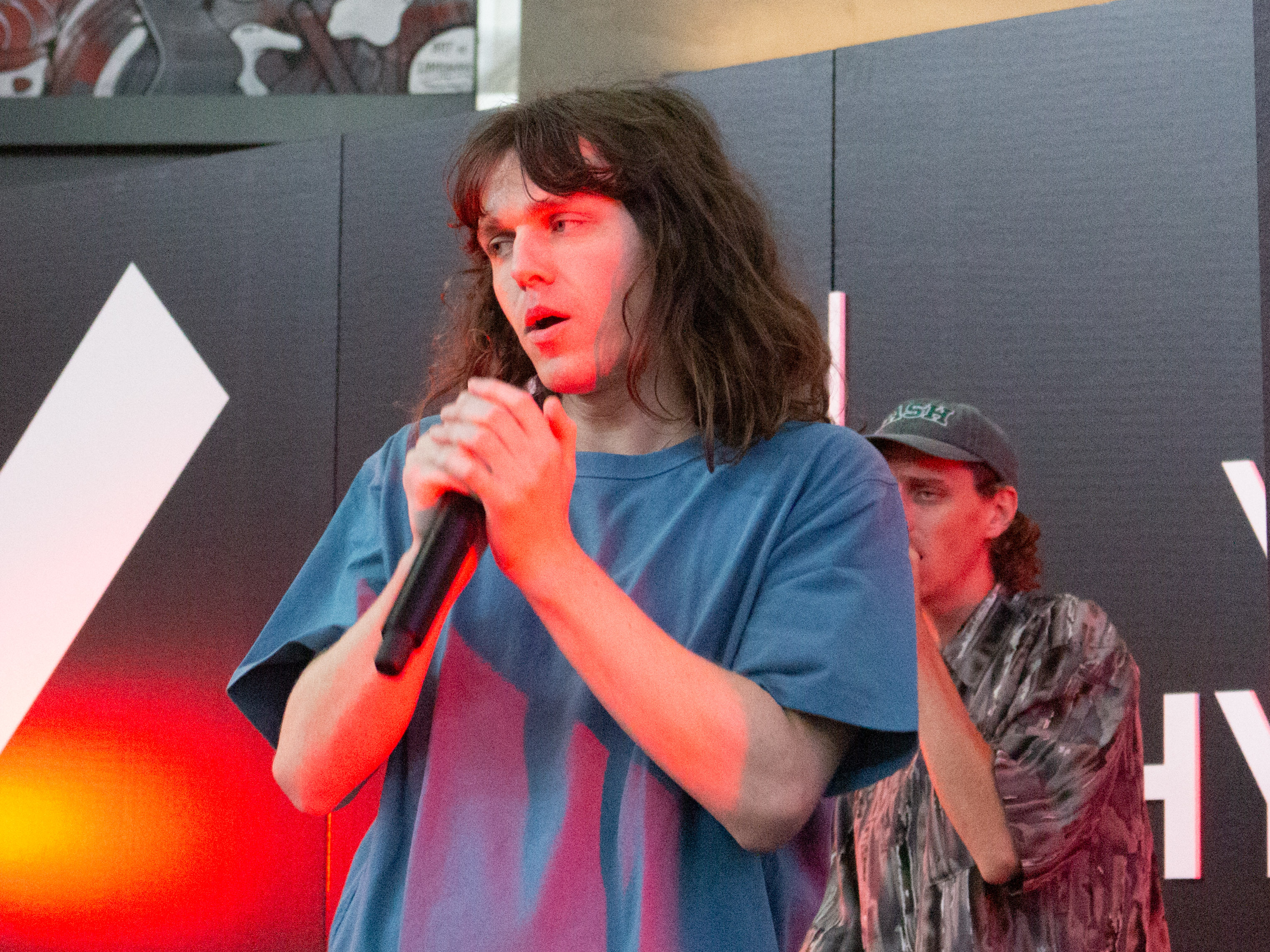
Allday performing at Westfield Carousel in October 2023

In March 2021, Allday announced the release of his fourth studio album Drinking with My Smoking Friends, released on 28 May 2021. The album peaked at number 13 on the ARIA Charts.

In November 2021, Allday returned with the standalone single, "Eyes on the Prize".

In September 2022, Allday released "Runtrack" and announced an Australian tour, commencing in November 2022. On 7 October 2022, Allday released Excuse Me.

=== 2024: The Necklace ===
In February 2024, Allday released "Access", the lead single from his fifth studio album, The Necklace, scheduled for release on 2 August 2024. A national tour was announced on 16 May 2024, scheduled to commence the following August.

== Discography ==
=== Studio albums ===
List of studio albums, with release date, label, and selected chart positions shown
Title	Details	Peak chart positions
Title	Details	AUS
Startup Cult	Released: 4 July 2014; Label: OneTwo (ONETWO002); Formats: CD, digital download, streaming	3
Speeding	Released: 21 April 2017; Label: OneTwo (ONETWO005); Formats: CD, LP, digital download, streaming	6
Starry Night Over the Phone	Released: 12 July 2019; Label: OneTwo (ONETWO008); Formats: CD, digital download, streaming, LP	7
Drinking with My Smoking Friends	Released: 28 May 2021; Label: AllDay (AllDay004); Formats: CD, LP, digital download, streaming	13
The Necklace	Released: 2 August 2024; Label: Dew Process (DEW9001544); Formats: CD, LP, digital download, streaming	48

=== Mixtapes ===
Title	Details
Noue Yesue	Released: September 2011; Label: AllDay (Self-released); Format: Digital download (Bandcamp)
Soon I'll Be in Cali	Released: late 2011; Label: AllDay (Self-released); Format: Digital download (Bandcamp)
A Skateboard Soirée (with C1)	Released: 3 May 2012; Label: AllDay (Self-released); Format: Digital download (Bandcamp)
Euphoria	Released: December 2012; Label: AllDay (Self-released); Format: Digital download (Bandcamp)
Soon I'll Be in Cali 2	Released: July 2013; Label: AllDay (Self-released); Format: Digital download (Bandcamp)
Soft Grunge Love Rap	Released: July 2015; Label: AllDay (Self-released); Format: Digital download (Bandcamp)
Excuse Me	Released: 7 October 2022; Label: AllDay Music; Format: Digital download

=== Compilations ===
Title	Details
Songs I Don't Hate	Released: July 2013; Label: Allday (Self-released); Formats: Digital download, Streaming; Note: Made up of songs from his previous free mixtapes from Bandcamp.
2013-2015 Songs	Released: 12 June 2020; Label: Allday Music Pty Ltd; Formats: Digital download, Streaming; Note: Made up of songs from YouTube and Bandcamp uploads from 2013-2015.

=== Extended plays ===
Title	Details	Peak chart positions	Certifications
Title	Details	AUS	Certifications
Loners Are Cool	Released: 5 April 2013; Label: TeamTrick (TEAM02); Format: Digital download	18	ARIA: Gold
Excuse Me	Released: 6 October 2022; Label: Allday Music; Format: Digital download, streaming	—	

=== Singles ===
==== As lead artist ====
List of singles as lead artist
Title	Year	Peak chart positions	Certifications	Album
Title	Year	AUS	Certifications	Album
"So Good" (with C1)	2012	—		A Skateboard Soirée
"Claude Monet"	2013	—	ARIA: Gold	Non-album single
"Right Now"	2014	69	ARIA: Gold	Startup Cult
"Cult"	2014	97		Startup Cult
"You Always Know the DJ"	2014	—	ARIA: Gold	Startup Cult
"Wolves" (featuring Sunni Colon)	2014	—		Startup Cult
"Dynamite" (with Asta)	2015	66		Non-album single
"Grammy"	2015	—		Soft Grunge Love Rap
"Monster Truck"	2016	—		Non-album single
"Sides" (featuring Nyne)	2016	—	ARIA: Gold	Speeding
"Send Nudes"	2016	—		Non-album single
"Raceway"	2016	—		Speeding
"In Motion" (featuring Japanese Wallpaper)	2017	—	ARIA: Platinum	Speeding
"Wonder Drug"	2018	—	ARIA: Gold	Starry Night Over the Phone
"Protection"	2019	—	ARIA: Gold	Starry Night Over the Phone
"Lungs"	2019	—		Starry Night Over the Phone
"Restless" (featuring The Veronicas)	2019	—		Starry Night Over the Phone
"All da Way"	2019	—		Non-album singles
"OTT" (with Memphis LK)	2020	—		Non-album singles
"After All This Time"	2020	—		Drinking with My Smoking Friends
"Void"	2021	—		Drinking with My Smoking Friends
"Stolen Cars"	2021	—		Drinking with My Smoking Friends
"Eyes on the Prize"	2021	—		Non-album singles
"Good Thanks"	2021	—		Non-album singles
"Problems Too" (with Skizzy Mars)	2022	—		Non-album singles
"Runtrack"	2022	—		Excuse Me
"Alone Again" (with Ouse)	2022	—		Non-album singles
"Not Her" (with Ouse)	2022	—		Non-album singles
"Access"	2024	—		The Necklace
"Drip Drop"	2024	—		The Necklace
"Miss You Still" (with Cub Sport)	2024	—		The Necklace
"Tarmeka"	2024	—		The Necklace
"Falling Under"	2025	—		Non-album singles
"Peroxide"	2025	—		Non-album singles
"Over the Moon"	2025	—		Non-album singles
"Psychic"	2025	—		Non-album singles

==== As featured artist ====
List of singles as featured artist
Title	Year	Album
"Bags Packed" (Bam Bam featuring Allday)	2013	Non-album single
"Life of the Party" (The Veronicas featuring Allday)	2021	Human
"As I Should" (YNG Martyr featuring Allday)	2023	Lovesick
"Dancer" (Poolclvb featuring Allday)	2024	Non-album single

== Awards and nominations ==
=== AIR Awards ===
The Australian Independent Record Awards (commonly known informally as AIR Awards) is an annual awards night to recognise, promote and celebrate the success of Australia's Independent Music sector. This Award is prestigious in Australia.

Year	Nominee / work	Award	Result	Ref.
2014	Startup Cult	Best Independent Hip Hop/Urban Album	Nominated	
2018	Speeding	Best Independent Hip Hop/Urban Album	Nominated	
2020	Starry Night Over the Phone	Best Independent Hip Hop/Urban Album	Nominated	
2023	Excuse Me	Best Independent Hip Hop Album or EP	Nominated	

=== Fowler's Live Music Awards ===
The Fowler's Live Music Awards took place from 2012 to 2014 to "recognise success and achievement over the past 12 months [and] celebrate the great diversity of original live music" in South Australia. Since 2015 they're known as the South Australian Music Awards.

Year	Nominee / work	Award	Result (wins only)
2014	Allday	Best Hip Hop Artist	Won

=== National Live Music Awards ===
The National Live Music Awards (NLMAs) are a broad recognition of Australia's diverse live industry, celebrating the success of the Australian live scene. The awards commenced in 2016.

Year	Nominee / work	Award	Result	Ref.
2019	Allday	Live Hip Hop Act of the Year	Nominated	
