= Japanese Wallpaper =

Australian singer-songwriter and producer (born 1997)

- Also known as: Japanese Wallpaper
- Born: Gabriel Strum; 2 May 1997 (age 29)
- Origin: Melbourne, Australia
- Occupation: Musician
- Instruments: Vocals; piano; guitar
- Years active: 2013–present
- Labels: Wonderlick Entertainment, Nettwerk

Gabriel Strum, known professionally as Japanese Wallpaper, is an Australian indie pop singer-songwriter and producer. He released his debut single "Breathe In" featuring Wafia on 10 October 2013. The song featured in Zach Braff's film Wish I Was Here. Strum has had three songs feature in the Triple J Hottest 100: "Between Friends" featuring Jesse Davidson at No. 97 (2014), "Forces" featuring Airling at No. 69 (2015) and "In Motion" featuring Allday at No. 44 (2017). He released his debut album Glow on 18 October 2019.

== Biography ==
Strum is originally from Melbourne, and was the winner of Triple J Unearthed High competition in 2014.

Since then, he has studied music composition and has produced for numerous notable Australian acts including: Mallrat, Holy Holy, Wafia, Eilish Gilligan, Bec Sandridge and Allday.

Japanese Wallpaper served as the support act for Lily Allen on her 2019 national tour of Australia.

== Discography ==
=== Albums ===
Title	Details
Glow	Released: 18 October 2019; Label: Wonderlick, Sony Music (LICK033); Format: digital download, CD, LP

=== EPs ===
Title	Details
War, Peace, Rocket Ships	Released: September 2011; Label: Japanese Wallpaper (JAP001); Format: digital download
Japanese Wallpaper	Released: 19 June 2015; Label: Zero Through Nine (ZTN007); Format: digital download, CD, LP, Cassette

=== Singles ===
==== As lead artist ====
List of singles, with selected chart positions
Title	Year	Peak chart positions	Album
Title	Year	AUS	Album
"Breathe In" (featuring Wafia)	2013	—	Japanese Wallpaper
"Waves" (featuring Pepa Knight)	2014	—	Japanese Wallpaper
"Between Friends" (featuring Jesse Davidson)	2014	—	Japanese Wallpaper
"Arrival"	2016	—	Japanese Wallpaper
"Forces" (featuring Airling)	2016	97	Japanese Wallpaper
"Cocoon"	2016	—	Glow
"Fooling Around"	2018	—	Glow
"Claws (Rework)" (with Megan Washington)	2019	—	non album single
"Imaginary Friends"	2019	—	Glow
"Tongue Tied"	2019	—	Glow
"Tell Me What You Mean by That"	2019	—	Glow
"Cool for a Second" (with Yumi Zouma)	2020	—	TBA
"Together" (with Wolfjay)	2020	—	TBA
"Better" (with Gretta Ray)	2020	—	TBA
"Leave a Light On"	2021	—	TBA

==== As featured artist ====
List of singles, with selected details
Title	Year	Certifications	Album
"In Motion" (Allday featuring Japanese Wallpaper)	2017	ARIA: Platinum	Speeding
"Loner Blood" (Ceres featuring Japanese Wallpaper)	2017		Stretch UR skin
"Previously" (Swim Good Now featuring Anna Weiebe & Japanese Wallpaper)	2018		Daylight

== Awards and nominations ==
=== AIR Awards ===
The Australian Independent Record Awards (commonly known informally as AIR Awards) is an annual awards night to recognise, promote and celebrate the success of Australia's Independent Music sector.

Year	Nominee / work	Award	Result
2015	themselves	Breakthrough Independent Artist	Nominated

=== APRA Awards ===
The APRA Awards are presented annually from 1982 by the Australasian Performing Right Association (APRA), "honouring composers and songwriters". They commenced in 1982.

Year	Nominee / work	Award	Result	Ref.
2022	"Closer" by Ngaiire (Ngaiire, Jack Grace, Gabriel Strum)	Song of the Year	Shortlisted	
2026	"Hideaway" by Mallrat (Grace Shaw / Styalz Fuego / Gab Strum)	Most Performed Alternative Work	Nominated	

=== J Award ===
The J Awards are an annual series of Australian music awards that were established by the Australian Broadcasting Corporation's youth-focused radio station Triple J. They commenced in 2005.

Year	Nominee / work	Award	Result
2014	themselves	Unearthed Artist of the Year	Nominated

=== Music Victoria Awards ===
The Music Victoria Awards are an annual awards night celebrating Victorian music. They commenced in 2006.

Year	Nominee / work	Award	Result	Ref.
2022	Gabriel Strum	Best Producer	Nominated	
2023	Gabriel Strum	Best Producer	Won	

=== National Live Music Awards ===
The National Live Music Awards (NLMAs) are a broad recognition of Australia's diverse live industry, celebrating the success of the Australian live scene. The awards commenced in 2016.

Year	Nominee / work	Award	Result	Ref.
2017	Japanese Wallpaper	Live Electronic Act (or DJ) of the Year	Nominated	
