= Cautionary Tales =

A cautionary tale is a story where a person ignores a warning and commits a dangerous or forbidden act, which leads to an unpleasant outcome.

Cautionary Tale or Cautionary Tales may also refer to:

== In print ==
- Cautionary Tales, modern edition title of Cautionary Tales for Children, a 1907 children's book written by Belloc
- Cautionary Tales, autobiographical stories by Stephen Tobolowsky
- Knuffle Bunny: A Cautionary Tale, a 2004 children's picture book by Mo Willems
- "Cautionary Tales", a story by Larry Niven from Playgrounds of the Mind (1991)

== Film and TV ==
- "Cautionary Tales" (Heroes), an episode of the TV series Heroes
- Bad Blood: A Cautionary Tale, a 2010 documentary
- Cautionary Tales (podcast), a podcast by English economist Tim Harford

== Music ==
- Cautionary Tales (album), a 2014 album by Harmony James
- Cautionary Tales, an album by Christopher Rees
- Cautionary Tales, a 2009 box set from Shadowland
- "A Cautionary Tale", a song on the album History of a Time to Come by Sabbat

== See also ==
- Cautionary Tales and Other Verses, a 1997 book by Posy Simmonds
