= Tailwind (disambiguation) =

Tailwind is a wind that blows in the direction of travel of an object.

Tailwind may also refer to:

== Aviation and military ==
- Operation Tailwind, a covert US Army operation during the Vietnam War
- Tailwind Airlines, an airline
- Wittman Tailwind, a light aircraft

== Other uses ==
- Tailwind CSS, a frontend CSS framework
- Tailwind Sports, former owner of Discovery Channel Pro Cycling Team
- Tailwind (Transformers), a fictional character
- Tailwind (album), album by Harmony James
