= Handfuls of Sky =

Studio album by Harmony James
- Released: January 2012 (Australia)
- Recorded: Australia
- Genre: Country roots
- Length: 43:20
- Label: Warner Music Australia
- Producer: Herm Kovac

Harmony James chronology
| Tailwind (2009) | Handfuls of Sky (2012) | Cautionary Tales (2014) |

Singles from Handfuls of Sky
- 1. "Pride" Released: 2011; 2. "Don't Say It" Released: 2012; 3. "Emmylou's Guitar" Released: 2012

Professional ratings
Review scores
| Source | Rating |
|---|---|
| Sydney Morning Herald | 3.5/5 stars |
| Buzz magazine | 4/5 stars |

Handfuls of Sky is the second studio album from Australian singer songwriter Harmony James, first released on a major label, Warner Music Australia.

The album features contributions by Troy Cassar Daley, Bill Chambers and The McClymonts.

Kim Cheshire from Country Update magazine wrote "The songwriting and vocals are much more mature and assured, the production warmer and a little more adventurous, and there's absolutely nothing here that's going to sway me from my opening salvo, she's still the best country songwriter we’ve got and as far as I can see she's still racing way ahead of the pack".

== Track listing ==
All tracks are written by Harmony James.

| No. | Title | Length |
|---|---|---|
| 1. | "Don't Say It" | 3:25 |
| 2. | "Emmylou's Guitar" | 4:04 |
| 3. | "Great Grey Cloud" | 4:08 |
| 4. | "Pride" | 3:25 |
| 5. | "Flying Too Close to the Sun" | 3:19 |
| 6. | "Wait This Long" | 3:31 |
| 7. | "Reach For You with Shane Nicholson" | 3:25 |
| 8. | "Fires of Hell" | 3:06 |
| 9. | "Hauling Cane" | 4:09 |
| 10. | "So Long" | 3:43 |
| 11. | "Roll With It" | 4:10 |
| 12. | "The Girl You See" | 2:57 |

Produced and engineered by Herm Kovac.

== Personnel ==
- Glen Wilson: drums
- Ian Lees: bass
- Glenn Hannah: electric guitars, mando guitar
- Stuart French: acoustic guitars, electric guitars
- James Gillard: acoustic guitars, bass guitar, backing vocals
- Michel Rose: dobro, mandolin
- Tim Crouch: fiddle, mandolin, cello
- Rod McCormack: banjo
- Bill Risby: piano
- Mark Punch: backing vocals
- Bill Chambers:electric guitar, lap steel, backing vocals
- Shane Nicholson: resonator guitar, duet on Reach For Me
- Troy Cassar-Daley: harmonica, banjo, backing vocals
- The McClymonts:backing vocals
- Hank Kovac: percussion
- Jesse Kovac: big drum, handclaps
