= Hope D =

Australian musician

- Born: Hope Defteros; May 17, 1999; Brisbane, Queensland, Australia
- Genres: Indie pop; indie rock
- Occupations: Singer; songwriter; musician
- Instruments: Vocals; guitar
- Years active: 2019–present
- Label: Select Music
- Website: www.hopedmusic.com

Hope Defteros (born 1999), known professionally as Hope D, is an Australian singer-songwriter and musician from Brisbane. Winning Queensland Music Awards in 2020 and 2021, she has released one EP – Cash Only (2021), and one studio album – Clash of the Substance (2023).

== Career ==
=== Early singles and Cash Only ===
In late 2019, Defteros released her debut single "Swim", which led her to be a finalist for the Billy Thorpe Scholarship. She also took out the Emerging Artist award at the 2020 Queensland Music Awards.

In March 2020 she released her second single, "Second", which she described was about: "a period of time in my life where I was going out partying too frequently and not being able to recall much from the night before". It ended up polling at number 69 in the Triple J Hottest 100 of 2020, marking her first appearance in the annual countdown.

Her next single "Common Denominator" was released in 2020, promoting her debut EP, Cash Only (2021). Throughout 2020 and 2021, Defteros performed at Splendour in the Grass, St Jerome's Laneway Festival, and King Street Crawl.

=== Clash of the Substance ===
On 17 September 2021, Hope D released "Happy Hangover", a song co-written with close friend G Flip. Defteros said the song is about "fully tripping out and having experiences that will later become nostalgic". In July 2022, she released "Emerald" and announced the forthcoming release of her debut studio album, Clash of the Substance, which came out on 10 February 2023.

== Discography ==
=== Studio albums ===
List of albums, with release date and label shown
Title	Album details
Clash of the Substance	Released: 10 February 2023; Label: Hope D (independent); Format: Digital download, streaming, vinyl LP

=== Extended plays ===
List of EPs, with release date and label shown
Title	EP details
Cash Only	Released: 5 February 2021; Label: Hope Defteros (independent); Format: Digital download, streaming

=== Singles ===
List of singles, with year released and album name shown
Title	Year	Album
"Swim"	2019	Non-album singles (Note: "Swim" and an extended version of "Second" were later included on the EP Cash Only.)
"Second"	2020	Non-album singles
"Common Denominator"	2020	Cash Only
"Miscommunicate"	2020	Cash Only
"Addict"	2021	Cash Only
"Valley Nights" (with Tia Gostelow and Sahara Beck)	2021	Non-album single
"Happy Hangover"	2021	Clash of the Substance
"Hate Goodbyes"	2022	Clash of the Substance
"Emerald"	2022	Clash of the Substance
"Senseless"	2023	Clash of the Substance
"Doormat"	2023	Clash of the Substance
"Nails"	2024	
"Hits So Hard"	2025	

== Awards and nominations ==
=== J Awards ===
The J Awards are an annual series of Australian music awards that were established by the Australian Broadcasting Corporation's youth-focused radio station Triple J. They commenced in 2005.

Year	Nominee / work	Award	Result	Ref.
J Awards of 2021	Hope D	Unearthed Artist of the Year	Nominated	

=== Queensland Music Awards ===
The Queensland Music Awards (previously known as Q Song Awards) are annual awards celebrating Queensland, Australia's brightest emerging artists and established legends. They commenced in 2006.

Year	Nominee / work	Award	Result (wins only)
2020	Herself	Emerging Artist Award	Won
2021	"Second"	Rock Award	Won
