= You Could Be Happy =

You Could Be Happy may refer to:

- You Could Be Happy, EP by Sahara Beck
- "You Could Be Happy", single by Paul Oakenfold featuring Angela McCluskey
- "You Could Be Happy", song by Snow Patrol Eyes Open
