= Jeremy Neale =

Australian songwriter and entertainer

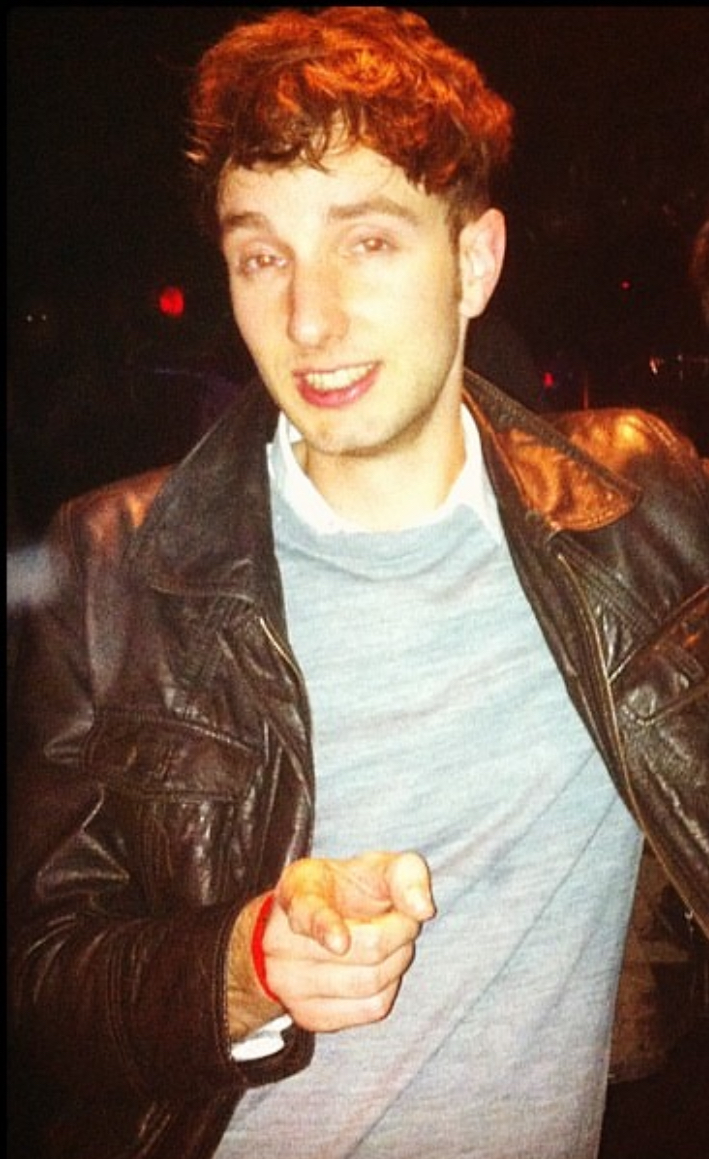
- Neale in Melbourne, 2014

Background information
- Born: Queensland, Australia
- Occupations: Songwriter, singer
- Instruments: Vocals
- Years active: 2012–present
- Labels: Jeremy Neale, Create/Control, Dot Dash
- Website: www.jeremyneale.com

Jeremy Neale is an Australian singer/songwriter and lead singer of band Velociraptor.

== History ==
Neale was a founding member of Brisbane band Velociraptor in 2008. In November 2017, Neale released his debut album, Getting the Team Back Together

At the 2018 Queensland Music Awards, Neale won Song of the Year for "Dancin' & Romancin'". In that year he also won QMusic’s Grant McLennan Scholarship. This enabled him to attend a songwriting masterclass at New York University. Neale hosted the National Live Music Awards of 2019

In February 2020, Neale released his second studio album, We Were Trying To Make It Out which was written in Brisbane and New York City over two years. He has spoken of the album's songs being about "the day-to-day struggles of the working class" presented in an upbeat fashion, "because I love things that sit at about 140-150 beats per minute". The Ramones and Prefab Sprout have influenced his sound.

== Discography ==
=== Studio albums ===
Title	Details
Getting the Team Back Together	Release date: 3 November 2017; Label: Jeremy Neale, Dot Dash (DASH045LP); Formats: CD, DD, LP, streaming
We Were Trying to Make It Out	Release date: 28 February 2020; Label: Jeremy Neale, Dot Dash (DASH2062LP); Formats: CD, DD, LP, streaming

=== Extended plays ===
Title	Details
In Stranger Times	Release date: November 2013; Label: Jeremy Neale, Create/Control (CC0000177); Formats: CD, DD, LP
Let Me Go Out in Style	Release date: September 2015; Label: Jeremy Neale, Dot Dash; Formats: CD, DD, LP, streaming

=== Singles ===
==== As lead artist ====
Title	Year	Album
"Winter Was the Time"	2012	non album singles
"Darlin'"	2012	non album singles
"A Love Affair to Keep You There"	2012	In Stranger Times
"In Stranger Times" (featuring Go Violets)	2013	In Stranger Times
"Swing Left"	2013	In Stranger Times
"The News"	2014	Let Me Go Out in Style
"Hold On Together" featuring Phoebe Imhoff)	2015	Let Me Go Out in Style
"The Love Calling"	2015	Let Me Go Out in Style
"Christmas Time (Is My Favourite Time of the Year)"	2016	non album single
"Dancin' & Romancin'"	2017	Getting the Team Back Together
"Small Talk" featuring Pool Shop)	2017	Getting the Team Back Together
"Christmas (Turn This Around)"	2017	non album single
"Video"	2018	Getting the Team Back Together
"Everything I Do Is Replaced by Two"	2019	We Were Trying to Make It Out
"Still Want You Around Me"	2020	We Were Trying to Make It Out
"Tried and True (Raise the Roof)"	2020	We Were Trying to Make It Out

== Awards and nominations ==
=== J Awards ===
The J Awards are an annual series of Australian music awards that were established by the Australian Broadcasting Corporation's youth-focused radio station Triple J. They commenced in 2005.

Year	Nominee / work	Award	Result
J Awards of 2013	Jeremy Neale	Unearthed Artist of the Year	Nominated

=== Queensland Music Awards ===
The Queensland Music Awards (previously known as Q Song Awards) are annual awards celebrating Queensland, Australia's brightest emerging artists and established legends. They commenced in 2006.

Year	Nominee / work	Award	Result (wins only)
2012	"Winter Was the Time"	Rock Song of the Year	Won
2013	"In Strange Times"	The Courier-Mail People's Choice Award Most Popular Male	Won
2018	"Dancin' & Romancin'"	Song of the Year	Won
2018	"Dancin' & Romancin'"	Rock Song of the Year	Won
