= Dribble (song) =

2020 song by Sycco

Single by Sycco

from the EP Sycco's First EP
- Released: 17 July 2020
- Length: 3:11
- Label: Wilder; Future Classic
- Songwriter(s): Sasha McLeod; Edward Quinn
- Producer(s): McLeod; Quinn

Sycco singles chronology
"Nicotine" (2020)	"Dribble" (2020)	"Germs" (2020)

Music video
- "Dribble" on YouTube

"Dribble" is a song by Australian singer-songwriter Sycco, released on through Wilder and Future Classic 17 July 2020 as the lead single from her debut extended play Sycco's First EP (2021).

"Dribble" was written and recorded in four hours by Sycco alongside producer and musician Edward Quinn.

"Dribble" received multiple accolades, placing at number 29 in Triple J's Hottest 100 of 2020 and receiving two awards at the 2021 Queensland Music Awards, for Song of the Year and Pop Song of the Year.

== Background ==
In a press statement, Sycco said: "This track was written in four hours. [Producer] Ed and I were tired and hungover, which maybe explains why it sounds a little dark. The guitar synth was added at the last minute but I can't imagine the song without it now."

In an interview with Atwood Magazine, McLeod said: "This song was inspired by someone talking in their sleep and me trying to work out the underlying meaning from it. I guess because there literally was no meaning from it, I was like, 'Ah, there [sic] – just dribbling' and then the concept of talking nonsense came about."

== Music video ==
The music video was released on 16 July 2020. It was directed by Madeline Randall and Summer King.

== Critical reception ==
Mitch Mosk from Atwood Magazine called the song "stunning" saying, "raw yet polished, it's a feverish indulgence of soaring vocals and dynamic synths reminiscent of Glass Animals' How to Be a Human Being, and it's a perfect introduction to Sycco for those who haven't met her yet. An intense immersion of psychedelia washes over the senses, coming to a peak in the chorus as the artist invites all to dwell in her wondrous world".

Describing Sycco as "sounding like a soulful, distant relative of Benee", Emma Jones of Purple Sneakers wrote: "her neo-soul vocals perfectly pierce the rich, thick and inescapable grooves of "Dribble", amplifying the lush production and sass-laden guitars to deliver one of this year's most exciting singles yet." Jones continued, stating: "Sycco pulls off the ambitious track with ease, and builds upon the already impressive foundation she's laid with songs like "Nicotine" and "Peacemaker".

=== Accolades ===
"Dribble" placed at number 29 in Triple J's Hottest 100 of 2020.

== Awards and nominations ==
=== Queensland Music Awards ===
Year	Nominee / work	Award	Result	Ref.
2021	"Dribble"	Song of the Year	Won	
2021	"Dribble"	Pop Song of the Year	Won	

== Track listings ==
Digital download
No.	Title	Length
1.	"Dribble"	4:00

Digital download (RIZ LA VIE remix)
No.	Title	Length
1.	"Dribble" (RIZ LA VIE remix)	4:01

Digital download (Live for Like a Version)
No.	Title	Length
1.	"Dribble" (Live for Like a Version)	4:29

Digital download (Tim Atlas remix)
No.	Title	Length
1.	"Dribble" (Tim Atlas remix)	3:14

== Credits and personnel ==
Adapted from Spotify.

- Sasha McLeod – vocals, writing, production
- Edward Quinn – writing, production
