= Women in Docs =

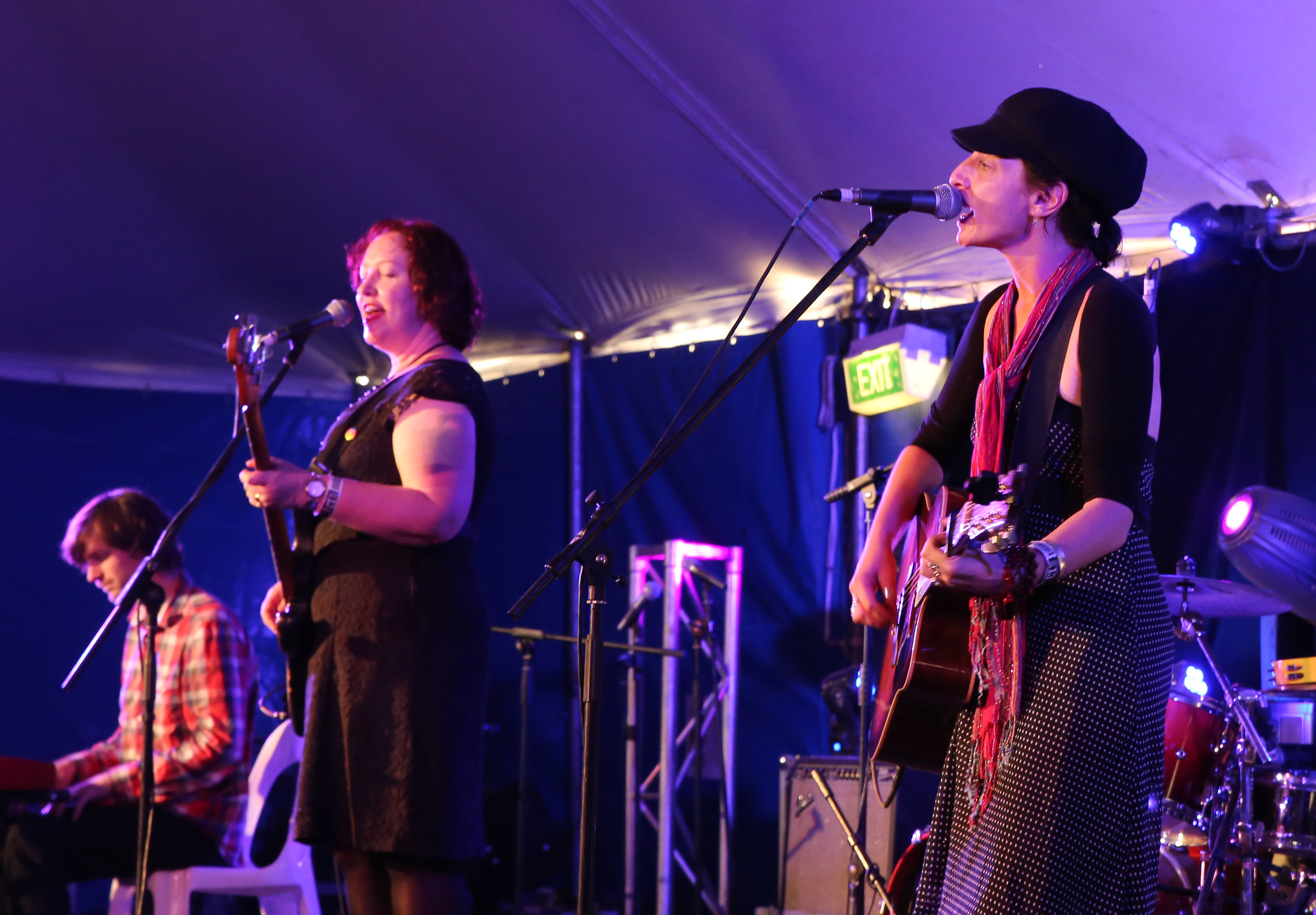
- Left to right: Silas Palmer, Chanel Lucas and Roz Pappalardo performing in March 2013

Background information
- Also known as: Roz and Chanel
- Origin: Townsville, Queensland, Australia
- Genres: Country, folk, acoustic, indie
- Years active: 1998–present
- Labels: Um&Ah/MGM Distribution
- Members: Chanel Lucas; Roz Pappalardo
- Website: womenindocs.com

Women in Docs are an Australian independent folk pop music duo consisting of Chanel Lucas on lead vocals, guitar and bass guitar; and Roz Pappalardo on lead vocals, guitar and harmonica. They formed in Townsville, Queensland in 1998 as Roz and Chanel but soon changed their name and have released three studio albums, Under a Different Sky (2001), Red Wine and Postcards (2006) and Carousel (2013). The group have toured throughout Australia, New Zealand, United States, Europe, and Asia. Pappalardo has also released a solo album.

== History ==
=== 1998-2005: Formation and Under a Different Sky ===
Chanel Lucas and Roz Pappalardo had performed together since they were students at James Cook University, Townsville Campus. With friends they formed rock and roll covers bands 'Viridian' and later 'Sandwich Bar', and worked in North Queensland from offshore islands to inland mining camps.

After years apart the two reunited to write their own material and "create music based around our harmonies because that was the one thing that people really enjoyed about our performances in the band". Lucas had seen a folk group, Tiddas, performing "Inside My Kitchen" on TV music video program, rage, "[i]t was a revelation for me to see three women singing harmonies, playing acoustic guitar and telling their stories through song. Right then and there I decided that I wanted to play acoustic guitar, focus on my vocals and write songs".

Women in Docs were formed initially as Roz and Chanel, a folk pop music duo, in 1998 in Townsville with Chanel Marie Lucas on lead vocals, guitar, and bass guitar; and Roslyn "Roz" Pappalardo on lead vocals, guitar, bass guitar and harmonica.. After a few gigs the host of a club they were performing at dubbed them Women in Docs referring to their footwear, Doc Martens.

In October 1998 Women in Docs issued their six-track debut extended play, women in docs. Two tracks were written by Lucas, two by Roz Pappalardo, "One Day Soon" was written by Sam Pappalardo (Roz's father), and "Prometheus" was co-written by Lucas and Roz. The lead track, "Tin Roof", was issued as a single and was also compiled on Australian Broadcasting Corporation's album, Music from the Far North and thereby received national radio airplay on the ABC.

In 1999 the group moved to Brisbane, to become an independent, folk-crossover, alt-country act. They gained various residencies at local venues and then performed at major festivals across Australia. A second EP, www.womenindocs.com, was issued in early 2000, and was distributed by MGM Distribution. Oz Music Project's Bryan Estepa was impressed by the six-track EP "[t]he combination of the punchy acoustic guitars and Roz & Chanel's perfectly harmonised voices makes their songs so irresistible and joyous".

They issued their debut studio album, Under a Different Sky, on Um & Ah Records and MGM Distribution in 2001. It was co-produced by the duo with Anthony Lycenko and Ben McCarthy. They used a variety of session musicians including Lycenko on electric and acoustic guitars; McCarthy on keyboards, piano, electric and bass guitars; and Silas Palmer on violin. The Courier-Mail's Noel Mengel noted the duo showed " ebullient personalities and infectious harmonies" when performing, while the album displayed "[e]ffervescent folk-pop ... They can rock it up, with an '80's punk-pop feel". Domenica Acitelli of Revolver caught their performance in May that year at Club Acoustica in Sydney, she noted their "[r]elenting, prolific melt down harmonies merged with an upbeat folk/rock lilt to the tunes dressed in front of a poised yet carefree room. Chanel and Roz infused a good dose of ‘Australiana’, which was tasted in the intonation of notes especially in a song addressing life on Crown Street, Surry Hills".

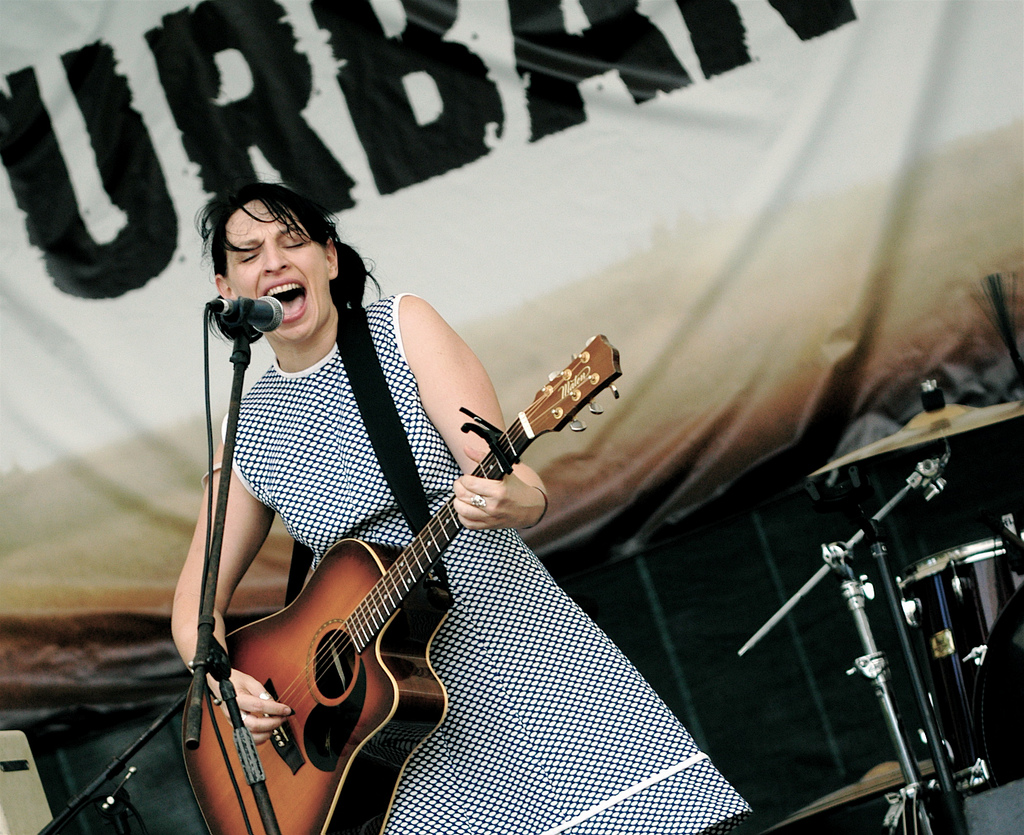
Roz Pappalardo at Urban Country Music Festival in Brisbane, Australia May 2010.

Their related tour included regional centres of Queensland, which was funded by an Arts Queensland grant. In August 2002 "Crown St", the album's lead track, was issued as a single. Another track, "Supermarket", also received national airplay on ABC Local Radio. In October their performance at the Woodford Folk Festival was recorded for a live broadcast by ABC Radio National's Late Night Live program. A live version of "Crown St", recorded at Club Acoustica, was issued on a various artists live album compilation, Club Acoustica: The Basement Showcases Volume 1 in March 2002. Lucas told Sacha Molitorisz of The Sydney Morning Herald about their association with the venue in Oxford Street, Darlinghurst, "La Bar was our first introduction to the Sydney music scene. From the first show I remember the warmth and the response of the audience, which was almost unexpected".

Also in 2002 they were invited by ABC's Radio National to represent Australia at the European Broadcasting Union's International Folk Festival in Hamburg. Lucas recalled "[w]e were a bit different… it was kind of scary, but it was really good. We got a really good response. We got in the local paper. We got to meet the Mayor of Hamburg town. We couldn’t understand what he was saying to us, and he couldn’t understand us either, so we had a great time". During the following year they performed at various Australian festivals and at venues across the country. A proposed appearance at the 2003 Shanghai Spring International Music Festival in May was postponed to the following year due to the severe acute respiratory syndrome (SARS) outbreak. They toured southern China and were broadcast by radio stations based in Shanghai.

"Crown St" appeared on various artists compilations, including The Basement Showcases Volume 1 (2002) released by Underfoot Records, and Time Off: Core Sampler 03 (2003), which "annoyed" Nathan Jolly at Oz Music Project with the group's "over-the-top Aussie accents and lingo-based song". They have been compared to the Indigo Girls (Canada) and The Waifs (Australia). With a reputation for stirring and humorous live performances, Women in Docs have toured consistently throughout Australia, North America, Europe, New Zealand and China. 2004 festival appearances included SXSW in Austin, Texas, Folk Alliance in San Diego, and Canadian Music Week. They issued their fourth EP, Times Like These, in that year. It was produced by David Nicholas (INXS, george).

=== 2006-present: Red Wine and Postcards ===
On 1 May 2006 Women in Docs released their second studio album, Red Wine and Postcards, which was produced and engineered by Darren Middleton (of Powderfinger). Middleton also supplied guitar, keyboards and backing vocals. Clayton Ford of The Dwarf website noted the "country tinged contemporary folk rock" of the album with "[t]ales of life, loss and being are delicately layered". Mediasearch's Chanel Bartolo felt the album was "amazing. Each song feels alive, almost as if it has an individual soul. There is heart in each word and each melody".

During July 2007 the duo performed in the US, Janine Schaults of Illinois Entertainer previewed their appearance at the National Women's Festival in Bloomington: "they have a breezy style that doesn’t bog down the songs with over emotionalism and a search for life’s deep meaning ... for music pleasant enough to allow listeners to drift into the world of the songwriter". In May 2009 they performed at the Brisbane Powerhouse to record a live album for US release. In August that year they toured North America including gigs in Vancouver and Philadelphia.

From late 2009 to 2011 the band was in hiatus as both members undertook new projects and concentrated on their private lives. Pappalardo formed an alt-country backing group, the Wayward Gentlemen consisting of Palmer on keyboards, mandolin, violin and harmonica; Aaron Millard on drums and percussion; Lincoln Retallack on bass guitar; and Rob Sherwood on electric and slide guitars. She released her debut solo album, The Lifeboat (September 2009), on Plus One Records. Laura Bethall of Maverick Magazine noted that Pappalardo is "direct and powerful in her approach, her songs strong and captivating" providing a "[b]eautiful collection of rock-inspired country". It includes her cover version of "Little Boxes" which was used – as well as the original and numerous other versions – on US TV series, Weeds.

In late 2011 Lucas and Pappalardo resumed collaborating periodically for "one-off gigs or just small shows, like local shows". With Lucas living in Brisbane and Pappalardo in Cairns they collaborated via Skype and Dropbox enabling them to "produce quite a high-quality album with very well-written songs".

By September 2013 Women in Docs had signed with Plus One Records. In November that year they issued the title track from their album, Carousel, and followed with their first Australian tour in four years. Lucas described their songwriting process "big difference is in the songwriting – usually Roz and I bring songs separately to preproduction and then we workshop them into Women in Docs songs. This time we wrote some songs together". For the album Pappalardo provided acoustic guitar, lead vocals, harmonica and banjo; Lucas was on acoustic guitar, lead vocals, bass guitar and ukulele.

== Members ==
- Chanel Lucas – lead vocals, guitar, bass guitar, bouzouki, mandolin, acoustic guitar, ukulele (1998–present)
- Roz Pappalardo – lead vocals, guitar, harmonica, bass guitar, acoustic guitar, banjo (1998–present)

=== Regular backing musicians ===
- Silas Palmer – violin, keyboard
- John Bedggood - violin, keyboard, piano accordion
- Geoff Green – drums

== Discography ==
=== Studio albums ===
Title	Details
Under a Different Sky	Released: September 2001; Label: Um&Ah Records (UM-18); Format: CD
Red Wine and Postcards	Released: May 2006; Label: Women in Docs (WIDCD005); Format: CD, Download
Carousel	Released: 2015; Label: Plus One Records (P1-550; Format: CD, Download

=== Extended plays ===
Title	Details
women in docs	Released: 1998; Label: Women in Docs (WIDCD001); Format: CD
www.womenindocs.com	Released: July 2000; Label: Women in Docs (WIDCD002); Format: CD
Women in Docs Live	Released: 2001; Label: Women in Docs (WIDCD003); Format: CD
Times Like These	Released: 2004; Label: Women in Docs (WIDCD004); Format: CD

== Awards ==
=== Q Song Awards ===
The Queensland Music Awards (previously known as Q Song Awards) are annual awards celebrating Queensland, Australia's brightest emerging artists and established legends. They commenced in 2006.

Year	Nominee / work	Award	Result (wins only)
2006	"Times Like These"	World / Folk Song of the Year	Won
