= Strangers (Tia Gostelow song) =

Single by Tia Gostelow featuring Lanks

from the album Thick Skin
- Released: 7 June 2018
- Length: 3:02
- Label: Lovely Records
- Songwriter: Tia Gostelow

Tia Gostelow singles chronology
| "Hunger" (2017) | "Strangers" (2018) | "We Are the People" (2018) |

Music video
- "Strangers" on YouTube

"Strangers" is a song recorded by Australian singer-songwriter Tia Gostelow, featuring Lanks. It was released in June 2018 as the fifth single from Gostelow's debut studio album, Thick Skin. In 2020, the song was certified gold in Australia.

== Reception ==
Al Newstead from ABC said "The duet doesn't fuss around, it's built around an instantly accessible guitar part and illuminated by haunting vocal harmonies." Newstead compared the song to the vibe of Angus & Julia Stone and #1 Dads.

== Certifications ==
| Region | Certification | Certified units/sales |
|---|---|---|
| Australia (ARIA) | Platinum | 70,000^{‡} |
^{‡} Sales+streaming figures based on certification alone.

== Release history ==
| Country | Date | Format | Label |
|---|---|---|---|
| Australia | 7 June 2018 | Digital download, streaming | Lovely Records |
