= Sunshine Salvation =

Studio album by 26
- Released: 26 October 2012 (Globally)
- Genre: Indie rock, Alternative
- Length: 50:58
- Label: Floodboy Records

26 chronology
Births, Deaths & Marriages (2008)	Sunshine Salvation (2012)

Sunshine Salvation is the third full-length studio album by Australian band 26, released on 26 October 2012 by Floodboy Records.

On 14 October, 26 launched the album with a one-off show in their home town of Brisbane, Australia. The intimate pre-release event involved the band playing the album live and in full, from start to finish, at the Black Bear Lodge in Fortitude Valley, Queensland.

== Track listing ==
All tracks are written by 26

Sunshine Salvation
No.	Title	Length
1.	"RLRR LRLL"	2:59
2.	"The Outside"	3:46
3.	"Someone Else"	3:00
4.	"King of Nothing"	3:28
5.	"My Quiet Revolution"	4:04
6.	"World in Miniature"	4:57
7.	"Deseo"	4:29
8.	"Bring On the Colour Guard"	4:37
9.	"Road Song"	5:03
10.	"Never Tell"	4:45
11.	"Sunshine Salvation"	5:19
12.	"100 Years"	4:25

== Personnel ==
- Nick O'Donnell — lead vocals, guitar
- Drew Fellows — keys, vocals
- Ross Duckworth — bass, vocals
- Iain Wilson — drums, vocals
- Luke Stephans --- keys, darkness
- Daniel Norman --- vocals, walrus
