= Chris Pickering =

Australian musician

Christopher James Pickering is an Australian alternative country singer, songwriter and guitarist based in Melbourne, Australia.

== Life ==
Pickering was born and grew up in the town of Warwick, about 130 kilometres (81 mi) south-west of Brisbane. Until June 2004, Chris drummed and sang for the Boat People.

Pickering released his debut solo EP, Hard to Find in 2004, and his debut album A Safer Place in 2005. His 2006 EP Ghost City was produced by ARIA Award-winning producer Magoo.

Pickering's "Edge of the Earth" was nominated for the 7th Annual Independent Music Awards for Alternative Country Song of the year. In 2008, Pickering showcased at the South by Southwest (SxSW) festival in Austin, Texas. In 2009, he represented Queensland at the North American Folk Music and Dance Alliance festival in Memphis, Tennessee. In 2010, Pickering released Work of Fiction, produced by Don Nix and recorded in studios in Memphis Tennessee and Brisbane Queensland.

In 2016, Pickering released Canyons, an album of songs recorded both at Bomb Shelter Studios in Nashville, Tennessee, and Joshua Tree, California, at Hicksville Trailer Park. The Hicksville sessions were co-produced with Adrian Mauro, and the Nashville Sessions co-produced with Andrija Tokic.

From 2014, he has been based in Melbourne, Australia, where he is also Head of Music at JMC Academy's Melbourne Campus.

== Discography ==
=== Albums ===
Title	Details
A Safer Place	Released: November 2005; Label: Chris Pickering (CP03); Format: CD
Excuses Excuses	Released: February 2008; Label: Chris Pickering; Format: CD, Digital download
Work of Fiction	Released: September 2010; Label: Chris Pickering; Format: CD, Digital download
Canyons	Released: August 2016; Label: Chris Pickering; Format: CD, Digital download

=== Extended plays ===
Title	Details
Hard to Find	Released: 2004; Label: MRA Entertainment (CP03); Format: CD
Ghost City	Released: 2006; Format: CD
Corners	Released: July 2014; Format: CD, digital download

== Awards ==
=== Queensland Music Awards ===
The Queensland Music Awards (previously known as Q Song Awards) are annual awards celebrating Queensland, Australia's brightest emerging artists and established legends. They commenced in 2006.

Year	Nominee / work	Award	Result (wins only)
2006	"Better Off"	Country Song of the Year	Won
2007	"The Humming Song"	Country Song of the Year	Won
