= James Grehan =

Australian singer and songwriter

- Born: Queensland, Australia
- Occupations: Songwriter, singer
- Instruments: Vocals
- Years active: 2001–present

James Grehan is an Australian singer and songwriter. Grehan has released four studio albums. He has performed at Woodford Folk Festival, Big Day Out and Valley Fiesta.

Grehan describes his music as "Smooth progressive folk, lightly salted with a garnish of electronic textures, easy to swallow with a pleasurable palate."

== Early life and career ==
In 2003, Grehan released his debut album, Rather Be a Butterfly which was described as a combination of "contemporary electronica with acoustic sounds".

In 2004, Grehan won Best Acoustic Artist at the 2004 Music Oz Awards. In 2005, Grehan's released his second album Chemical Sunsets which was proceeded by the single, "Code Red".

In 2008, Grehan was nominated for five awards at the Q Song Awards, winning three.

In 2011, Grehan release Paper Parallels, which featured "Falling" which won two awards at the 2010 Q Song Awards, making James the most awarded Q Song winner in the history of the awards.

== Discography ==
=== Studio albums ===
Title	Details
Rather Be a Butterfly	Release date: 2003; Label: Amber Records, MGM Music (AMB001); Formats: CD
Chemical Sunsets	Release date: September 2005; Label: Bubblewrap Records (BWR001); Formats: CD, DD
Space Between the Silence	Release date: August 2008; Label: Bubblewrap Records (BWR002); Formats: CD, DD
Sketches & Silhouettes	Release date: June 2009; Label: Bubblewrap Records (BWR003); Formats: CD, DD

=== Extended plays ===
Title	Details
Long Road	Release date: May 2010; Label: Bubblewrap Records (BWR004); Formats: CD, DD
Paper Parallels	Release date: 8 April 2011; Label: Bubblewrap Records (BWR005); Formats: CD, DD

== Awards and nominations ==
=== APRA Music Awards ===
The APRA Awards are held in Australia and New Zealand by the Australasian Performing Right Association to recognise songwriting skills, sales and airplay performance by its members annually.

Year	Nominee / work	Award	Result
2010	"Hold On"	Blues and Roots Work of the Year	Nominated

=== Q Song Awards ===
The Queensland Music Awards (previously known as Q Song Awards) are annual awards celebrating Queensland, Australia's brightest emerging artists and established legends. They commenced in 2006.

Year	Nominee / work	Award	Result (wins only)
2008	"Til You Come Home"	Alternative Song of the Year	Won
2008	"Til You Come Home"	Regional Song of the Year	Won
2008	"Til You Come Home"	The Courier-Mail People's Choice Award	Won
2010	"Falling"	Alternative Song of the Year	Won
2010	"Falling"	Regional Song of the Year	Won
