= Births, Deaths & Marriages =

Studio album by 26
- Released: 24 May 2008 (Australia)
- Genre: Indie rock, Alternative
- Length: 46:49
- Label: Floodboy Records

26 chronology
The King Must Die (2005)	Births, Deaths & Marriages (2008)	Sunshine Salvation (2012)

Births, Deaths & Marriages is the second full-length studio album by Australian band 26, released on 24 May 2008 by Floodboy Records and MGM Distribution.

With 26's growing popularity from the success of their first album, The King Must Die, the band toured Australia in 2006 for the release of their single "Friendly Fire", which went on to win Rock Song of the Year at the Queensland Music Awards as well as being a finalist in The Courier-Mail People's Choice Awards. The single also received airplay on national youth radio network Triple J and FBI Radio in Sydney.

The album's opening track, "A New Beginning", featured in the season finale of NBC’s Rand Ravich-created police procedural drama series, Life. The episode aired in the US and Canada to more than 5,000,000 viewers on Wednesday, 8 April 2009, and aired in Australia on Network Ten on 29 April to over 776,000 viewers. The show also aired in an additional 22 countries. As a result, "A New Beginning", along with other selected tracks from 26's catalogue, went on to receive airplay on numerous US college/alternative/AAA radio stations.

The title of Births, Deaths & Marriages stems from a series of life-changing events which impacted each individual band member in 2007 and shaped the writing of the album: frontman Nick O’Donnell's second child was born, drummer Iain Wilson's father died, the band lost a close friend to cancer, and bassist Ross Duckworth got married.

== Track listing ==
All tracks are written by 26

Births, Deaths & Marriages
No.	Title	Length
1.	"A New Beginning"	4:23
2.	"Aloha"	3:44
3.	"The Optimist"	4:31
4.	"Friendly Fire"	4:09
5.	"You & the Song You Rode In On"	5:10
6.	"Births, Deaths & Marriages"	6:45
7.	"Storm"	1:15
8.	"Boy Meets Girl. Girl Meets Boy."	3:51
9.	"Bear With a Sore Head"	4:35
10.	"Dear Mr Devil,"	3:35
11.	"Take Me Home"	4:55

== Personnel ==
- Nick O'Donnell — lead vocals, guitar
- Drew Fellows — keys, vocals
- Ross Duckworth — bass, vocals
- Iain Wilson — drums, vocals
