= Sycco =

Australian singer, songwriter and producer (born 2001)

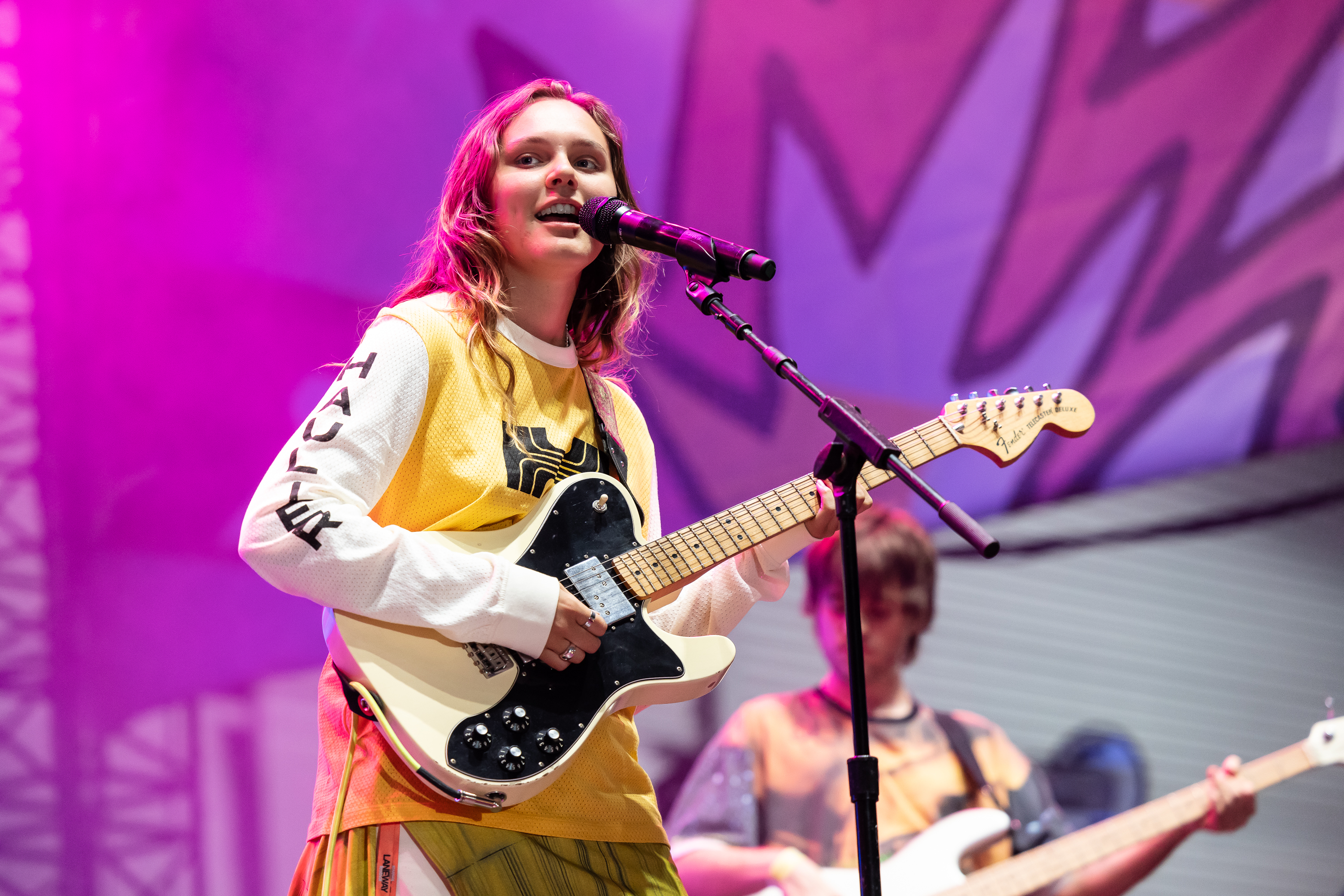
- Sycco in 2023

Background information
- Born: Sasha McLeod; 26 August 2001 (age 25); Brisbane, Queensland, Australia
- Genre: Bedroom pop
- Occupations: Singer; songwriter; producer; musician
- Instruments: Vocals; guitar; production
- Years active: 2018–present
- Label: Future Classic
- Website: syccoworld.com

Sasha McLeod (born 26 August 2001), known professionally as Sycco (SIGH-co), is an Australian singer-songwriter and producer from Brisbane. She was nominated for Triple J Unearthed Artist of the Year in 2020, having released the pop singles "Nicotine" and "Dribble" in the same year.

== Early life ==
McLeod grew up in Brisbane, Queensland. McLeod is Indigenous Australian, having reconnected with her Indigenous identity through her Torres Strait Islander descent in her teens.

== Career ==
McLeod's father taught her to play the guitar at seven years old. She began making music from an early age, having created an album at the age of 15, and adopted the artist name Sycco as a reference to psychedelia.

Sycco's debut single "Starboard Square" was released in August 2018, as part of her first album "Sycco 1/2". She also released "Tamed Grief" and "Peacemaker" in 2019. In 2020, Sycco released the singles "Nicotine" and "Dribble", leading her to be nominated for Triple J Unearthed Artist of the Year at the J Awards of 2020.

Sycco has performed at St Jerome's Laneway Festival, and Darwin Festival and supported Vera Blue, Spacey Jane and Glass Animals on tour. She also covered Tame Impala and Pnau for Like a Version.

In March 2022, Sycco released "Superstar". Of the song, McLeod said “I'm really proud of this song... the lyrics are satirical obviously – I used to work at a grocery store and it was fun to imagine a glowed-up future me having a tantrum in there."

In September 2022, Sycco released "Ripple". In a press release, McLeod said the track was "really fun" to make and "came together super quickly". McLeod said Flume and Chrome Sparks "did such a great job on the prod[uction]", developing what she describes as "a beautiful environment of synths and drums that evoke such a nice feeling of ease but also discomfort at points".

In July 2024, Sycco announced the forthcoming release of their debut album, Zorb.

In August 2025, Sycco released two EPs and announced an Australian tour commencing in September through to November 2025.

== Discography ==
=== Albums ===
List of albums, with selected chart positions
Title	Album details	Peak chart positions
Title	Album details	AUS
Zorb	Released: 23 August 2024; Label: Future Classic; Formats: LP, digital download, streaming	— (Note: Zorb did not enter the ARIA Albums Chart, but peaked at number 12 on the ARIA Australian Artist Albums Chart.)
Look Up	Released: 2 October 2026; Label: Future Classic; Formats: CD, LP, digital download, streaming	93

=== Extended plays ===
List of EPs, with release date and label shown
Title	EP details
Sycco's First EP	Released: 30 July 2021; Label: Future Classic; Formats: Digital download, streaming
Home is Where The Zorb Is Part 1	Released: 1 August 2025; Label: Future Classic; Formats: digital
Home is Where The Zorb Is Part 2	Released: 22 August 2025; Label: Future Classic; Formats: digital

=== Singles ===
==== As lead artist ====
List of singles, with year released and album name shown
Title	Year	Peak chart positions	Album
Title	Year	NZ Hot	Album
"Starboard Square"	2018	—	Non-album singles
"Tamed Grief"	2019	—	Non-album singles
"Peacemaker"	2019	—	Non-album singles
"Nicotine"	2020	—	Non-album singles
"Dribble"	2020	—	Sycco's First EP
"Germs"	2020	—	Sycco's First EP
"My Ways"	2021	26	Sycco's First EP
"Time's Up"	2021	—	Sycco's First EP
"Past Life"	2021	—	Sycco's First EP
"Weakness" (with Alice Ivy)	2021	—	TBA
"Superstar"	2022	—	TBA
"Jinx"	2022	—	TBA
"Ripple" (featuring Flume and Chrome Sparks)	2022	37	Zorb
"I'd Love to Tell You"	2024	—	Zorb
"Swarm"	2024	—	Zorb
"Touching and Talking"	2024	—	Zorb
"Monkey Madness"	2024	—	Zorb
"Meant to Be"	2024	—	Zorb
"None of That" (with Mel Blue)	2025	—	Home Is Where the Zorb Is
"All In"	2025	—	Home Is Where the Zorb Is
"Joy On Overdrive"	2025	—	Home Is Where the Zorb Is
"Look Up"	2026	—	Look Up
"I've Loved and I've Lost"	2026	—	Look Up
"Tell Me When You're Home"	2026	—	Look Up

==== As featured artist ====
List of singles, with year released and album name shown
Title	Year	Album
"Love Affairs" (DJ Picolo featuring AJ Mitchell and Sycco)	2021	Non-album single

=== Promotional singles ===
List of promotional singles, with year released and album name shown
Title	Year	Album
"Embrace" (Triple J Like a Version)	2020	Non-album singles
"Dribble" (Live for Like a Version)	2021	Non-album singles
"Jump (For My Love)" (Live for Like a Version)	2025	Non-album singles

== Awards and nominations ==
=== AIR Awards ===
The Australian Independent Record Awards (known colloquially as the AIR Awards) is an annual awards night to recognise, promote and celebrate the success of Australia's Independent Music sector.

Year	Nominee / work	Award	Result	Ref.
2021	Herself	Breakthrough Independent Artist of the Year	Nominated	
2022	"Weakness" (with Alice Ivy)	Best Independent Dance, Electronica or Club Single	Nominated	
2025	"Meant to Be"	Independent Song of the Year	Nominated	
2025	Future Classic and The Annex Zorb	Independent Marketing Team of the Year	Nominated	

=== APRA Awards ===
The APRA Awards are held in Australia and New Zealand by the Australasian Performing Right Association to recognise songwriting skills, sales and airplay performance by its members annually.

Year	Nominee / work	Award	Result	Ref.
2022	herself	Breakthrough Songwriter of the Year	Nominated	
2023	"Superstar"	Most Performed Alternative Work of the Year	Nominated	

=== ARIA Music Awards ===
The ARIA Music Awards is an annual award ceremony event celebrating the Australian music industry.

Year	Nominee / work	Award	Result	Ref.
2024	Zorb	Michael Gudinski Breakthrough Artist	Nominated	

=== J Awards ===
The J Awards are an annual series of Australian music awards that were established by the Australian Broadcasting Corporation's youth-focused radio station Triple J. They commenced in 2005.

Year	Nominee / work	Award	Result	Ref.
2020	Herself	Unearthed Artist of the Year	Nominated	
2024	Zorb	Australian Album of the Year	Won	
2026	Look Up	Australian Album of the Year	Nominated	

=== National Indigenous Music Awards ===
The National Indigenous Music Awards recognise excellence, innovation and leadership among Aboriginal and Torres Strait Islander musicians from throughout Australia. They commenced in 2004.

Year	Nominee / work	Award	Result	Ref.
2021	Herself	Artist of the Year	Nominated	
2021	"Dribble"	Song of the Year	Nominated	
2021	"My Ways"	Film Clip of the Year	Nominated	

=== Queensland Music Awards ===
The Queensland Music Awards (previously known as Q Song Awards) are annual awards celebrating Queensland, Australia's brightest emerging artists and established legends. They commenced in 2006.

Year	Nominee / work	Award	Result (wins only)	Ref.
2021	"Dribble"	Song of the Year	Won	
2021	"Dribble"	Pop Song of the Year	Won	
2022	"My Ways"	Song of the Year	Won	
2022	"My Ways"	Pop Song of the Year	Won	
2023	"Ripple"	Electronic / Dance Award	Won	
2025	"Meant to Be"	Pop Award	Won	
