= Dancin' & Romancin' =

Single by Jeremy Neale

from the album Getting the Team Back Together
- Released: 31 August 2017
- Length: 3:27
- Label: Dot Dash Records
- Songwriter(s): Jeremy Neale

Jeremy Neale singles chronology
"Christmas Time (Is My Favourite Time of the Year)" (2016)	"Dancin' & Romancin'" (2017)	"Small Talk" (2017)

Music video
- "Dancin' & Romancin'" on YouTube

"Dancin' & Romancin'" is a song written and recorded by Australian singer Jeremy Neale, released in August 2017 as the lead single from Neale's debut studio album, Getting the Team Back Together.

Neale said of the track: "Dancin' & Romancin'" is about how hard it can be to maintain a relationship when you and your partner have very different working schedules. When the stars eventually align and you both get a night off together however, it's a wonderful reunion and the trials in between are quickly forgotten."

At the 2018 Queensland Music Awards, the song won Song of the Year and Rock Song of the Year.
