= Tia Gostelow =

Australian singer-songwriter

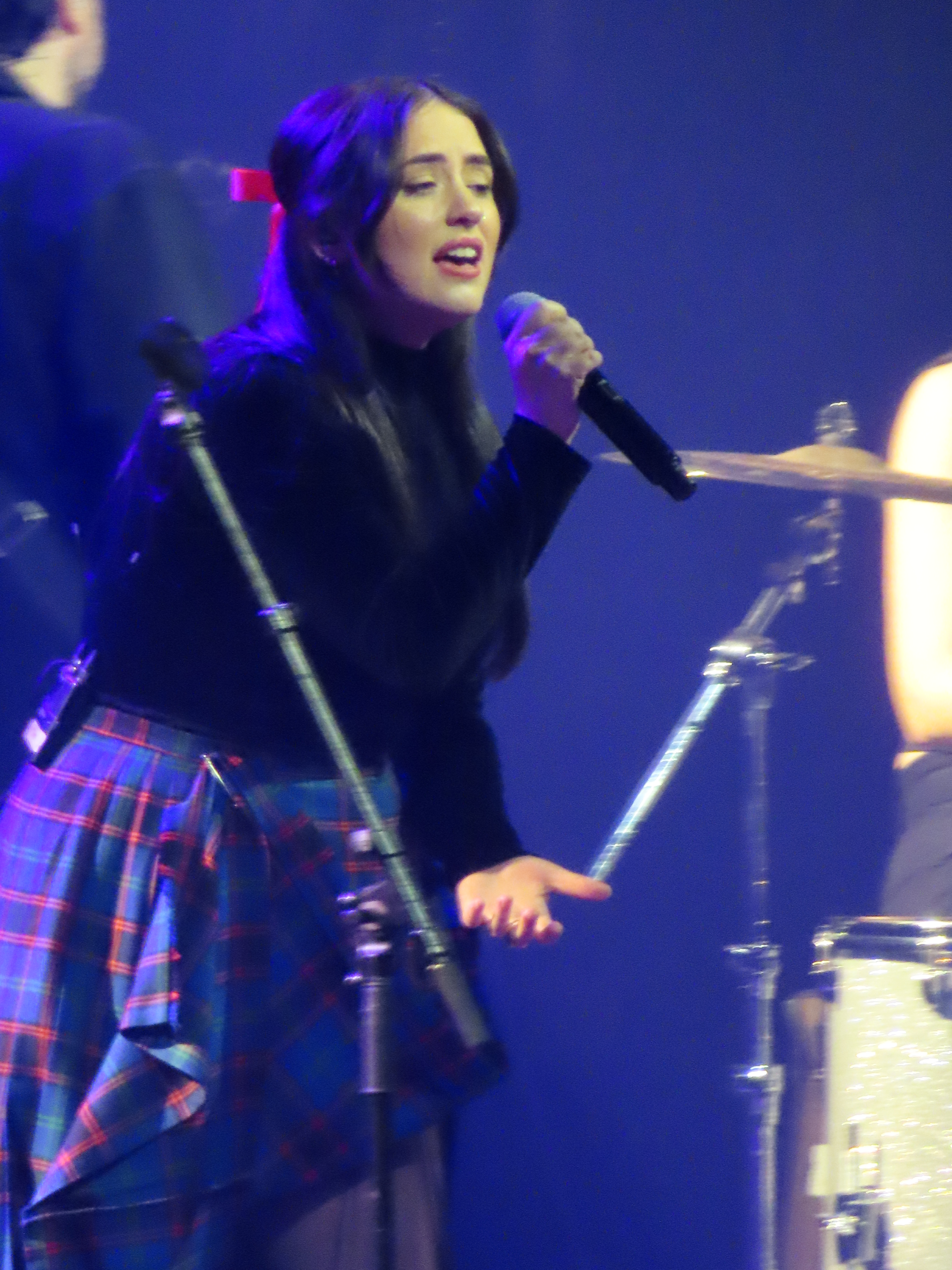

Background information
- Born: Tia Gostelow; Mackay, Queensland, Australia
- Occupations: Singer; songwriter
- Years active: 2015–present
- Label: Lovely Records
- Website: tiagostelow.com

Tia Gostelow is an Indigenous Australian singer-songwriter from Mackay, Queensland. Gostelow released her debut studio album, Thick Skin, in 2018 on Lovely Records. Further albums, Chrysalis and Head Noise followed.

== Early life and education ==
Tia Gostelow grew up in the regional Australian town of Mackay, Queensland, adjacent to the Coral Sea coast, Australia. When she was four years old, she relocated to Groote Eylandt a remote island in the Gulf of Carpentaria with her family for her father's work. She spent six years there before moving back to Mackay, where she went to high school.

Gostelow's Aboriginal roots are based in Cape York's Luma Luma tribe where her grandfather is an elder.

== Career ==
=== 2015–2018 ===
In 2015, at the age of 16, Gostelow wrote "State of Art" which was released in February 2016 as her debut single. "State Of Art" received airplay on national youth broadcaster Triple J, won the station's 2016 Indigenous Initiative and placed top 5 in Triple J Unearthed High in 2016. Gostelow was invited to showcase at Bigsound 2016, which was her first ever gig with her band. This performance coincided with the release of her second single "Vague Utopia" which was also received high rotation on Triple J.

In May 2017, Gostelow released single "That's What You Get". At the 2017 Queensland Music Awards, the single was nominated for 6 awards, winning two.

In June 2018, she released the single "Strangers".

In September 2018, Gostelow released her debut studio album, Thick Skin to positive reviews.

Thick Skin was nominated for Album of the Year at the 2019 National Indigenous Music Awards.

=== 2019–2021: Chrysalis ===
In July 2019, Gostelow released "Get to It", her first new material single since Thick Skin.

In April 2020, ABC records released a live album titled Triple J Live at the Wireless. The album was recorded at The Lansdowne Hotel, Sydney on 23 February 2019, during her Thick Skin tour. It was first broadcast on 6 May 2019, before its official release in April 2020.

In October 2020, Gostelow released Chrysalis.

=== 2022–present: Head Noise ===
In April 2023, Gostelow announced the forthcoming release of her third studio album, Head Noise, scheduled for release in August 2023, preceded by singles "Spring to Life", "Sour", "Early Twenties". and "I'm Getting Bored of This".

== Influences ==
Gostelow has openly discussed her musical influences as foremost fellow regional singer-songwriter Melody Pool, as well as Mumford & Sons and The Jungle Giants.

Gostelow has said she was also inspired to play music after seeing Taylor Swift perform live in Australia.

== Awards and nominations ==
Thick Skin was nominated for Album of the Year at the 2019 National Indigenous Music Awards.

At the 2019 Queensland Music Awards, Gostelow made Australian history by being the youngest winner of Album of the Year.

=== AIR Awards ===
The Australian Independent Record Awards (commonly known informally as AIR Awards) is an annual awards night to recognise, promote and celebrate the success of Australia's Independent Music sector.

Year	Nominee / work	Award	Result	Ref.
2021	Chrysalis	Best Independent Pop Album or EP	Nominated	

=== National Indigenous Music Awards ===
The National Indigenous Music Awards (NIMA) recognize excellence, dedication, innovation and outstanding contribution to the Northern Territory music industry. It commenced in 2004.

Year	Nominee / work	Award	Result	Ref.
2017	herself	New Talent of the Year	Nominated	
2019	Thick Skin	Album of the Year	Nominated	
2021	Chrysalis	Album of the Year	Nominated	
2021	"Two Lovers"	Film Clip of the Year	Nominated	

=== Queensland Music Awards ===
The Queensland Music Awards (previously known as Q Song Awards) are annual awards celebrating Queensland, Australia's brightest emerging artists and established legends. They commenced in 2006.

Year	Nominee / work	Award	Result (wins only)
2017	"Vague Utopia"	Folk Song of the Year	Won
2017	"State of Art"	Schools Song of the Year	Won
2019	Thick Skin	Album of the Year	Won
2024	"Spring to Life"	Indigenous Award	Won

== Discography ==
=== Studio albums ===
List of studio albums, with release date and label shown
Title	Album details	Certifications
Thick Skin	Released: 14 September 2018; Label: Lovely Records (LR AUDQL 1801/1802); Formats: CD, LP, digital download, streaming	ARIA: Gold
Chrysalis	Released: 30 October 2020; Label: Lovely Records (LR AUDQL 2020); Formats: CD, LP, digital download, streaming	
Head Noise	Released: 18 August 2023; Label: Lovely Records (LR AUDQL 2301); Formats: LP, digital download, streaming	

=== Live albums ===
List of live albums, with release date and label shown
Title	Album details
Triple J Live at the Wireless	Released: 24 April 2020; Label: ABC Records; Formats: Digital download, streaming

=== Singles ===
==== As lead artist ====
List of singles as lead artist, with year released and album shown
Title	Year	Certifications	Album
"State of Art"	2016		Thick Skin
"Vague Utopia"	2016		Thick Skin
"That's What You Get"	2017		Thick Skin
"Hunger"	2017		Thick Skin
"Strangers" (featuring Lanks)	2018	ARIA: Platinum	Thick Skin
"We Are the People" (Triple J Like a Version)	2018		Like a Version: Volume Fourteen
"Phone Me"	2018		Thick Skin
"Blue Velvet" (Live piano version)	2019		Non-album singles
"Get to It"	2019		Chrysalis
"Rush"	2020		Chrysalis
"Psycho"	2020		Chrysalis
"Always" (featuring Holy Holy)	2020		Chrysalis
"Two Lovers"	2020		Chrysalis
"Valley Nights" (with Hope D and Sahara Beck)	2021		non album singles
"Say It to My Face"	2022		non album singles
"Spring to Life"	2023		Head Noise
"Sour"	2023		Head Noise
"Early Twenties"	2023		Head Noise
"I'm Getting Bored of This"	2023		Head Noise
"Poison" (Triple J Like a Version)	2023		
"All Ur Sorrow"	2024		TBA
"Taking My Time"	2024		TBA
"Mirrors"	2024		TBA
"Wasting Days"	2024		TBA
"Moving in Circles"	2024		TBA

==== As featured artist ====
List of singles as featured artist, with year released and album shown
Title	Year	Album
"Candy Hearts" (Hunny Bunny featuring Tia Gostelow)	2019	Non-album single
"You, Me & the Sky" (Big Sand featuring Tia Gostelow)	2022	Non-album single
"Thinking About Us" (Ivey featuring Tia Gostelow)	2023	Non-album single
"Sleezy Steezy Cool" (3% featuring Tia Gostelow)	2024	Kill the Dead

==== Non-single album appearances ====
Title	Year	Album
"Around Here"	2019	Deadly Hearts 2
