= Dakuta =

- Origin: Brisbane, Australia
- Genres: Rock, Funk, Blues, Reggae, Trip Hop
- Years active: 1999 - Present
- Label: independent
- Members: Angela Cundell; Chris Cadbury; Cliff Williams; David Carlin; Jon Samiec
- Website: Official website

Dakuta is an Australian band from Brisbane. They formed in 1999.

== Discography ==
=== Albums ===
Title	Details
Die Arise	Released: April 2002; Format: CD
Dakuta	Released: 2004; Format: CD
The Drum	Released: 2006; Format: CD
Shock	Released: 2008; Format: CD

== Awards ==
=== Q Song Awards ===
The Queensland Music Awards (previously known as Q Song Awards) are annual awards celebrating Queensland, Australia's brightest emerging artists and established legends. They commenced in 2006.

Year	Nominee / work	Award	Result (wins only)
2006	"Pulp Funky"	Rhythm and Blues Song of the Year	Won
LA Music Awards	"Pulp Funky"	Rhythm and Blues Best Singer Song Writer	Won
