= Queensland Music Awards =

Australian annual music awards

- Awarded for: Celebrating the achievements of Queensland's established and emerging musicians.
- Location: Brisbane, Queensland
- Country: Australia
- Presented by: QMusic
- First award: 2006; 20 years ago
- Final award: Current
- Website: www.queenslandmusicawards.com.au/about

The Queensland Music Awards (commonly known as QMA and known as the Q Song Awards from 2006 to 2010) are annual Australian music awards presented by QMusic. Since the inaugural event in 2006, the awards have celebrated Queensland's emerging artists.

== Description ==
The awards are presented by QMusic, the official music industry development association for Queensland, which also presents BIGSOUND music festival.

Each year, the QMA Song of the Year is immortalised in a plaque on Fortitude Valley's Walk of Fame in the Brunswick Street Mall.

== 2006 Q Song Awards ==
The 2006 Q Song Awards winners.

Major awards

- Song of the Year - "Unsettle My Heart" by The Boat People
- Published song of the Year - "Songbird" by Bernard Fanning
- Grant McLennan Lifetime Achievement Award – "Cattle and Cane" by Grant McLennan
- QMusic Encouragement Award - "Don't You Choose Me" by Kate Bradley

Genre awards

- Blues and Roots - "Honey Don't" by The Gin Club
- Country - "Better Off" by Chris Pickering
- Electronic / Dance - "Tin Cat" by My Ninja Lover
- Hip Hop - "Analgestic" (remix) by The Winner Coopers
- Indigenous - "Native Language" Song by Freddie Shortjoe
- Jazz - "Mesmerisation" by Sean Foran
- Mixed / Alternative - "Jackie Marshall" by Jackie Marshall
- Pop - "Apartment" by Kate Miller-Heidke
- Punk Metal - "Plausible Deniability" by Monkeybone
- Regional - "Feel No More" by Dr Octopus
- Rhythm & Blues - "Pulp Funky" by Dakuta
- Rock - "Friendly Fire" by 26
- World / Folk - "Times Like These" by Women in Docs
- Primary School - "Listen to Me" by Christalla Pippos
- Secondary School - "What Is It?" by Sean Gagen

People's Choice Award

- The Courier-Mail People's Choice Award - "Unsettle My Heart" by The Boat People

== 2007 Q Song Awards ==
The 2007 Q Song Awards took place on 14 August 2007. The winners are listed below.

Major awards

- Song of the Year - "Not the Same" by Tim Stewart
- Published song of the Year - "Science Is Golden" by The Grates
- Grant McLennan Lifetime Achievement Award - Kev Carmody
- QMusic Encouragement Award - Danny Widdicombe

Genre awards

- Alternative - "Not the Same" by Tim Stewart
- Blues and Roots - "Dust" by Mason Rack and Steve Balbi
- Country - "The Humming Song" by Chris Pickering
- Electronic / Dance - "Make Amends" by PTY LTD
- Gospel Spiritual - "Just a Dreamer" by Jamie Wells
- Hip Hop - "Beats from the East" by Briztronix
- Indigenous - "Abacus" by Luke Peacock
- Jazz – "Time to Be" by Louise Denson and Ingrid James
- Pop - "Shoebox" by Keir Nuttall
- Punk Metal – "The Lords Wine Press" by The Quickening
- Regional - "How Is It" by The McMenamins
- Rock - "No Start/Red Light" by Kate Bradley
- World / Folk - "See the Smoke" by Andrew Morris
- Primary School - "Crickey Mate" by Terry Reid and the children of 7R, Trinity Anglican School
- Secondary School - "Kim's Song" by Emma Louise Lobb

People's Choice Award

- The Courier-Mail People's Choice Award - "Kim's Song" by Emma Louise Lobb

== 2008 Q Song Awards ==
The 2008 Q Song Awards took place in August 2008 at The Tivoli in Fortitude Valley. The event was hosted by Richard Fidler and Vijay Khurana. The winners are listed below.

Major awards

- Song of the Year - "Ten Paces Away" (written by Ben Salter) by The Gin Club
- Published song of the Year - "From Ghost Town" by Robert Forster
- Grant McLennan Lifetime Achievement Award - Mike Chapman
- Billy Thorpe Scholarship Award - Michael Gavriel Rose

Genre awards

- Songs of Applewood and QMusic - "Maybe We've Met Before" by Steve Grady
- Alternative - "Til You Come Home" by James Grehan
- Blues and Roots - "Yellow Moon" by 8 Ball Aitken
- Country - "Dusty Boots" by Shari Williams
- Electronic New Music - "Watching It Unfold" by Lawrence English
- Folk and Ballad - "You Me and the Sea" by Ben Salter
- Gospel & Spiritual - "The Family Song" by Tyrone Noonan
- Hip Hop - "Common Ground" by Contact Crew
- Indigenous - "Power" by Mathew Devitt
- Jazz – "Reaching Out" by Sean Foran
- Pop - "Strawberry Wine" by Scott Bromiley and Tim Morrissey
- Punk Metal – "Dearly Beloved" by Torn Asunder
- Regional - "Til You Come Home" by James Grehan
- Rock - "Ten Paces Away" by Ben Salter
- World / Folk - "Crane Song" by Tenzin Choegyal
- Primary School - "Love Chime" by Jazz D'Arcy
- Secondary School - "The Boat Song" by Jonno Garcia & Shaun Pryor

People's Choice Award

- The Courier-Mail People's Choice Award - "Til You Come Home" by James Grehan

== 2009 Q Song Awards ==
The winners are listed below.

Major awards

- Song of the Year – "Danshyttan" by Timothy Carroll
- Published song of the Year – "Big Big Love" by Troy Cassar-Daley
- Grant McLennan Lifetime Achievement Award – The Bee Gees
- QMusic Encouragement Award – "Tip Toes" by Ange Takats
- Billy Thorpe Scholarship Award – Alan Boyle

Genre awards

- Alternative – "Set It Right" by Hungry Kids of Hungary
- Blues and Roots – "Heavy Stuff" by Claire Whiting
- Country - "Outback Booty Call" by 8 Ball Aitken
- Folk and Ballad – "Danshyttan" by Timothy Carroll
- Gospel & Spiritual – "Holy Love" by Bec Shuker
- Hip Hop & R&B – Bubblegum by Mr Laneous
- Indigenous – "What's Going On?" by Lucas Proudfoot
- Jazz – "The Walls" by Hannah Macklin and Steve Newcomb
- New World & Experimental – "2004" by Benjamin Thompson
- Pop – "Rainbow Kraut" by Tim Morrissey, Scott Bromiley and Peter Bernoth
- Punk – "Boredoms" by Benjamin Thompson
- Regional – "Karanda Reggae" by Adem Brim
- Rock – "Bring On the Colour Guard" by Nick O'Donnell, Drew Fellows, Ross Duckworth and Iain Wilson
- World / Folk – "Bom Fazer" by Anje West and Owen Newcomb
- Primary School – "Country Outback Girl" by Romany Elmas
- Secondary School – "City" by Andrew Redford

People's Choice Award

- The Courier-Mail People's Choice Award – "Baby You've Changed" by Ben Carstens, Simon Radich, Matt Tanner and Adam Toole

== 2010 Q Song Awards ==
The 2010 Q Song Awards took place on 10 August 2010 at The Tivoli in Fortitude Valley. The event was hosted by Richard Fidler and Sarah Howells. The winners are listed below.

Major awards

- Song of the Year - "Wrist Watch" by Hungry Kids of Hungary
- Published song of the Year - "I Don't Even Know Where to Start" by David McCormack
- Grant McLennan Lifetime Achievement Award - Carol Lloyd
- QMusic Encouragement Award - "Today's Song" by The Cairos
- Billy Thorpe Scholarship Award - Andrew Redford

Genre awards

- Alternative - "Wrist Watch" by Hungry Kids of Hungary
- Blues and Roots - "Falling" by James Grehan
- Country - "Country Town" by The Duke Wilde Band
- Dance / Electronic - "Kafka Remixed" by Peter Golikov
- Folk and Ballad - "Classified (WVTM)" by Mardi Lumsden
- Gospel & Spiritual - "Messiah" by Eric Ossebaar
- Indigenous - "Paint My Cup" by Busby Marou
- Jazz – "Jazz" by Sean Foran
- Pacific Island - "One to Wait" by Charles Wall
- Pop - "Firestarter" by Dan Parsons
- Punk – "The Oh Yeah" by The Villains of Wilhelm
- Regional - "Falling" by James Grehan
- Rock - "Getting Wise" by Michael Tomlinson
- Urban - "The Soul of Troubadour" by Impossible Odds
- World / Folk - "The Owl, The Fairy and the Grasshopper" by Alesa Lajana Borsboom
- Primary School - "Daddy" by Jessica Coleman
- Secondary School - "Rain" by Kahlia Ferguson

People's Choice Award

- The Courier-Mail People's Choice Award - "Every June" by My Fiction

== 2011 Queensland Music Awards ==
The 2011 QMA Awards took place on 16 August 2011 at the Old Museum Building, Brisbane. The event was hosted by Richard Fidler and Sarah Howells. It featured performances from Elixir featuring Katie Noonan, Emma Louise, The Medics, DZ Deathrays, Streamer Bendy and the students from Brisbane's Aboriginal Centre of Performing Arts. The winners are listed below.

Major awards

- Song of the Year - "Jungle" by Emma Louise
- Album of the Year - I Want That You Are Always Happy by The Middle East
- Grant McLennan Lifetime Achievement Award - Bill Hauritz
- Export Achievement Award - Kate Miller-Heidke
- Billy Thorpe Scholarship Award – Sam Hales

Genre awards

- Blues and Roots - "One Step" by Kooii
- Country - "Move Into the City" by James Blundell
- Dance / Electronic - "The Stars Have Aligned" by DieVsCity
- Folk - "1000 Sundowns" by Emma Louise
- Heavy - "A Burning Horizon" by Tria Mera
- Indigenous - "Beggars" by The Medics
- Jazz – "Saudade" by Roberto Iregui (with Marially Pacheco)
- Pop - "Jungle" by Emma Louise
- Rock - "Gebbie Street" by DZ Deathrays
- Urban - "Robots" by Schoolfight
- World - "Between the Green and Blue" by The Barleyshakes
- Schools (Grade 6-12) - "Ode to Abigail" by Stephen Smith

People's Choice Awards

- The Courier-Mail People's Choice Award Most Popular Male - "The Coward" by Ben Salter
- The Courier-Mail People's Choice Award Most Popular Female - "Caught in the Crowd" by Kate Miller Heidke
- The Courier-Mail People's Choice Award Most Popular Group - "Youngbloods" by The Amity Affliction

== 2012 Queensland Music Awards ==
The 2012 QMA Awards took place on 14 August 2012 at the Old Museum Building, Brisbane. The event was hosted by Katie Noonan and Sarah Howells.

The winners are listed below.

Major awards

- Song of the Year - "Do You Hear" by Cub Sport
- Album of the Year – The Cat by Ben Salter
- Grant McLennan Lifetime Achievement Award - Ed Kuepper
- Export Achievement Award - DZ Deathrays
- Billy Thorpe Scholarship Award - Astrid and The Asteroids

Genre awards

- Blues & Roots - "Golden" by Band of Frequencies
- Children's Music - "The Hopping Mouse" by The Lamplights
- Country - "Precious Little" by Harmony James
- Dance / Electronic - "M&R" by Bec Laughton
- Folk - "Raisin Heart" by Mosman Alder
- Heavy - "Dawn to Rise" by A Breach of Silence
- Indigenous - "Red Roses" by Sue Ray
- Jazz – "Dresden" by Marially Pacheco
- Pop - "Do You Hear" by Cub Sport
- Regional - "Rainstrom" by Jordan Brodie
- Rock - "Winter Was the Time" by Jeremy Neale
- Urban - "The Valley" by Rainman
- World - "Panini Fandango" by Lüke
- Schools (Grade 6-12) - "You Could Be Happy" by Sahara Beck

People's Choice Awards

- The Courier-Mail People's Choice Award Most Popular Male - Pete Murray
- The Courier-Mail People's Choice Award Most Popular Female - Kate Miller Heidke
- The Courier-Mail People's Choice Award Most Popular Group - The Grates

== 2013 Queensland Music Awards ==
The 2013 QMA Awards took place on 13 August 2013 at Tivoli Theatre in Brisbane. 21 awards were distributed. The winners are listed below.

Major awards

- Song of the Year - "Surrender" by Ball Park Music
- Album of the Year – vs Head vs Heart by Emma Louise
- Export Achievement Award - Emma Louise

Genre awards

- Blues & Roots - "Fallen Empire" by Kingfisha
- Children's Music - "Shake it Down" by Nadia Sunde
- Country - "EmmyLou's Guitar" by Harmony James
- Dance / Electronic - "Snarly" by MKO
- Folk - "Minnesota" by Ange Takats
- Heavy - "Chasing Ghosts" by The Amity Affliction
- Indigenous - "Rosie" by Thelma Plum
- Jazz – "The Alligator Escalator" by Andrew Butt Trio +
- Pop - "Surrender" by Ball Park Music
- Regional - "Jacky Kneebone" by Jayson Watkin
- Rock - "Six Months in a Cast" by The Trouble With Templeton
- Urban - "Let There Be Hope" by BlaqCarrie featuring Adam George
- Video - "XO" by Georgia Potter
- World - "Pollito " by The Saruzu Quartet
- Schools (Grade 6-12) - "I Cannot Lie" by Kimberley Terrace

People's Choice Awards

- The Courier-Mail People's Choice Award Most Popular Male - "In Strange Times" by Jeremy Neal
- The Courier-Mail People's Choice Award Most Popular Female - "Boy" by Emma Louise
- The Courier-Mail People's Choice Award Most Popular Group - "I Am What You Want Me to Be" by The Jungle Giants

== 2014 Queensland Music Awards ==
There were no awards in 2014, resetting the date cycle. The awards were moved from August to March for 2015, and awards are given for released in the preceding year. In October 2014, Executive Officer for QMusic Denise Foley said "QMusic is excited to begin the application process for the QMAs, and celebrate the new timing of the Awards moving to the annual date of March in 2015. We wanted to ensure that the finalists and winners were given the uncompromised attention that they deserve."

== 2015 Queensland Music Awards ==
The 2015 QMA Awards took place on 30 March 2015 at Brisbane Powerhouse and hosted by Sarah Howells and Fred Leone. 22 awards were distributed. The winners are listed below.

Major awards

- Song of the Year - "Dulcify" by Halfway
- Album of the Year – Hungry Ghost by Violent Soho
- Grant McLennan Lifetime Achievement Award - Mick Medew
- Billy Thorpe Scholarship Award - Ayla

Self-Nominating Awards

- Blues & Roots - "Bearing the Crown" by Leanne Tennant
- Children's Music - "Hungry Crocodile Chomp" by The Kangagang
- Country - "Dulcify" by Halfway
- Dance / Electronic - "Short Term Plan" by Michelle Xen
- Folk - "Live Like I'm Dying" by Quintessential Doll
- Heavy - "Numbers" by Guards of May
- Indigenous - "Wake Up" by The Medics
- Jazz – "Closing Time" by Laique
- Pop - "Wasted Pilots" by Airling
- Regional - "To the Sky" by The Vernons
- Rock - "Holiday Home" by The Grates
- Urban - "None the Wiser" by Dubmarine
- Video - "Arcadia" by The Kite String Tangle (directed by Daniel Harley)
- World - "Enfants du Chemin (Children of the Road) " by MZAZA
- Schools (Grade 6-12) - "Day's of Doom" by Saskia

People's Choice Awards

- The BOQ People's Choice Award Most Popular Male – Bobby Alu
- The BOQ People's Choice Award Most Popular Female – Sahara Beck
- The BOQ People's Choice Award Most Popular Group - The Amity Affliction

== 2016 Queensland Music Awards ==
The 2016 QMA Awards took place on 21 March 2016 at Brisbane Powerhouse and hosted by Gen Fricker. The winners are listed below.

Major awards

- Song of the Year - "Like Soda" by Violent Soho
- Album of the Year - Illegals in Heaven by Blank Realm
- Grant McLennan Lifetime Achievement Award - Noel Mengel
- Billy Thorpe Scholarship Award – Luke Peacock
- Export Achievement Award – Sheppard

Acknowledgements

- Highest Selling Single – "Do You Remember" by Jarryd James
- Highest Selling Album – The Veronicas by The Veronicas

Self-Nominating Awards

- Blues & Roots - "Impolite" by Bearfoot
- Children's Music - "Kangaroo Dance a Roo" by Carolyn Simpson & The Kangagang
- Country - "Spinning Wheels" by Dana Hassall
- Dance / Electronic - "Tenderness" by Standby Empire
- Folk - "Mother Mother" by Sahara Beck
- Heavy - "Marigold" by Caligula's Horse
- Indigenous - "Fruits of Our Labour" by Luke Peacock
- Jazz – "Hope in My Pocket" by Sean Foran, Rafael Karlen & Kristin Berardi
- Pop - "Golden Fleece" by Amy Shark
- Regional - "Waiting" by Ayla
- Rock - "Like Soda" by Violent Soho
- Urban - "Move Actively" by Astro Travellers
- Video - "TV" by Eves the Behavior (directed by Hannah Karydas, Adam Spark)
- World - "NIGHTWATCH" by MZAZA
- Schools (Grade 6-12) - "Pristine" by Doolie

People's Choice Awards

- The BOQ People's Choice Award Most Promising Male Songwriter – Joe Agius (The Creases)
- The BOQ People's Choice Award Most Promising Female Songwriter – Deena
- The BOQ People's Choice Award Most Promising Song Writing Team - Avaberée

== 2017 Queensland Music Awards ==
The 2017 QMA Awards took place on 27 March 2017 at the Brisbane Powerhouse. 24 awards were distributed. The winners are listed below.

Major awards

- Song of the Year - "Adore" by Amy Shark
- Album of the Year - Waco by Violent Soho
- Grant McLennan Lifetime Achievement Award - Ritchie Yorke
- Billy Thorpe Scholarship Award – Marville (Ash Kerley)
- Export Achievement Award – The Amity Affliction

Acknowledgements

- Highest Selling Single – "In My Blood" by The Veronicas
- Highest Selling Album – This Could Be Heartbreak by The Amity Affliction

Self-Nominating Awards

- Blues & Roots - "Gentle Annie" by Leanne Tennant
- Country - "Three in and There's Nothing But the Stars" by Halfway
- Electronic - "Boyfriend (Repeat)" by Confidence Man
- Folk - "Vague Utopia" by Tia Gostelow
- Heavy – "Drink the Rum" by Lagerstein
- Indigenous - "Ngayuwa Nalyelyingminama (I Love You)" by Emily Wurramara
- Jazz – "Une Fille" by Sean Foran
- Pop - "Adore" by Amy Shark
- Regional - "Adore" by Amy Shark
- Rock - "Poverty Line" by Good Boy
- Urban - "Wild Heart" by Romy
- Video - "Boredom" by Hey Geronimo (directed by Ross Pearson, Pete Kilroy)
- World - "Aware" by High Life
- Schools (Grade 6-12) - "State of Art" by Tia Gostelow

People's Choice Awards

- The BOQ People's Choice Award for Most Popular Male artist – Jarryd James
- The BOQ People's Choice Award for Most Popular Female artist - Dami Im
- The BOQ People's Choice Award for Most Popular Group - Cub Sport

== 2018 Queensland Music Awards ==
The 2018 QMA Awards took place on 14 May 2018 at the Royal International Convention Centre, Brisbane. 23 awards were distributed. The winners are listed below.

Major awards

- Song of the Year - "Dancin' & Romancin'" by Jeremy Neale
- Album of the Year - Quiet Ferocity by The Jungle Giants
- Grant McLennan Lifetime Achievement Award - Chad Morgan
- Billy Thorpe Scholarship Award – Greta Stanley
- Export Achievement Award – Amy Shark

Acknowledgements

- Highest Selling Single – "Adore" by Amy Shark
- Highest Selling Album – Ripcord by Keith Urban

Self-Nominating Awards

- Blues & Roots - "Blood to Give" by Karl S Williams
- Country - "Well Dressed Man" by Brad Butcher
- Electronic - "The Prize" by The Kite String Tangle (featuring Bridgette Amofah)
- Heavy – "Ethereal" by The Brave
- Hip Hop / Rap – "Put Me On" by Crooked White
- Indigenous - "Ngayuwa Nalyelyingminama (I Love You)" by Emily Wurramara
- Jazz – "Asset or Liability" by Trichotomy
- Pop - "Weekends" by Amy Shark
- Regional - "Weekends" by Amy Shark
- Rock - "Dancin' & Romancin'" by Jeremy Neale
- Singer / Songwriter – Amy Shark
- Soul / Folk / R&B - "Without You" by Eleea Navarro
- Video - "Same Same" by Waax (directed by Gregory Kelly, Pernell Marsden)
- World - "Junior Was His Name" by Sue Ray
- Schools (Grade 6-12) - "Something Real" by Xander Holmes

People's Choice Awards

- Metro Venue of the Year – The Tivoli, Brisbane
- Regional Venue of the Year - Solbar
- Festival of the Year – Big Pineapple Music Festival

== 2019 Queensland Music Awards ==
The 2019 QMA Awards took place on 19 March 2019 at the Royal International Convention Centre, Brisbane. The event was hosted by Patience Hodgson and Mel Buttle. 23 awards were distributed. The winners are listed below.

Major awards

- Song of the Year - "Dreaming" by Clea
- Album of the Year - Thick Skin by Tia Gostelow
- Grant McLennan Lifetime Achievement Award - Seaman Dan
- Billy Thorpe Scholarship Award – Pool Shop
- Export Achievement Award – Confidence Man

Acknowledgements

- Highest Selling Single – "I Said Hi" by Amy Shark
- Highest Selling Album – Love Monster by Amy Shark

Self-Nominating Awards

- Blues & Roots - "Tap Sticks" by Emily Wurramara
- Country - "Wild Heart" by Emma Beau
- Electronic - "Give it Time" by The Kite String Tangle (featuring Aalias)
- Heavy – "The Armour You Own" by Dead Letter Circus
- Hip Hop / Rap – "Pack Your Bags" by Resin Dogs
- Indigenous - "Lady Blue" by Emily Wurramara
- Jazz – "Long Black" by The Biology of Plants
- Pop - "Dreaming" by Clea
- Regional - "Here We Go Again" by Sahara Beck
- Rock - "Used to Be in Love" by The Jungle Giants
- Singer / Songwriter – "I Said Hi" by Amy Shark
- Soul / Folk / R&B - "The Sound of Light" by Mark Peric
- Video - "Ghost in the Machine" by Buttah
- World / Folk - "Everybody Talks" by Asha Jefferies
- Schools (Grade 6-12) - "Little Things" by Tokyo Twilight (featuring DVNA)

People's Choice Awards

- Metro Venue of the Year – The Triffid, Brisbane
- Regional Venue of the Year - Night Quarter
- Festival of the Year – Big Pineapple Music Festival

== 2020 Queensland Music Awards ==
The 2020 QMA Awards took place on 3 March 2020 at the Fortitude Music Hall in Brisbane and included performances from The night featured performances from Jaguar Jonze, Cub Sport, Nat Dunn, Busby Marou and Order Sixty6. The winners are listed below.

Major awards

- Song of the Year - "Heavy Hearted" by The Jungle Giants
- Album of the Year - Better in Blak by Thelma Plum
- Grant McLennan Lifetime Achievement Award - Brentyn 'Rollo' Rollason
- Billy Thorpe Scholarship Award – Harry Phillips
- Export Achievement Award – Nat Dunn
- QMusic Honorary Award – Denis Handlin (in recognition of his 50-year tenure at Sony Music Entertainment)
- Emerging Artist of the Year – Hope D

Acknowledgements

- Highest Selling Single – "Mess Her Up" by Amy Shark
- Highest Selling Album – Life by Conrad Sewell

Self-Nominating Awards

- Blues & Roots - "Naba Norem (The Reef Song)" by Busby Marou
- Country - "Give It a Miss" by Oh Harlow
- Electronic - "P()l4r" by The Kite String Tangle
- Heavy – "Still No Change" by DZ Deathrays
- Hip Hop / Rap – "Sele" by Carmouflage Rose
- Indigenous - "Arrived" by Mau Power (featuring Marcus Corowa)
- Jazz – "Monkey" by Sean Foran
- Pop - "Heavy Hearted" by The Jungle Giants
- Regional - "Bring It All Back" by Leanne Tennant
- Rock - "Just Exist" by Eliza & The Delusionals
- Singer / Songwriter – "Beijing Baby" by Jaguar Jonze
- Soul / Folk / R&B - "Soul Fruit" by Pink Matter
- Video - "P()l4r" by The Kite String Tangle
- World Music award - "Make Everything" by Matt Hsu's Obscure Orchestra
- Schools (Grade 6-12) - "Wired" by Hanni

People's Choice Awards

- Metro Venue of the Year – The Triffid, Brisbane
- Regional Venue of the Year - Solbar
- Festival of the Year – Big Pineapple Music Festival

== 2021 Queensland Music Awards ==
The 2021 QMAs took place at the Fortitude Music Hall on 5 May 2021. The winners are listed below.

Major Awards

- Song of the Year - "Dribble" by Sycco
- Album of the Year - Ball Park Music by Ball Park Music
- Export Achievement Award - Sheppard
- Billy Thorpe Scholarship - Beckah Amani
- Grant McLennan Lifetime Achievement Award - Lynette Irwin
- Emerging Artist of the Year - Beckah Amani

Acknowledgements

- Highest Selling Single - "Everybody Rise" by Amy Shark
- Highest Selling Album - The Speed of Now Part 1 by Keith Urban
- Innovation Award - Troubadour Wagons

Self-Nominating Awards

- Blues / Roots Award - "God Is a Bomb" by Karl S Williams
- Children's Music Award - "Love Everybody" by Nyssa Ray
- Contemporary Classical Award - Moonlight Illusion by Ray Lin
- Country Award - "Like Hank Would" by Melody Moko
- Electronic / Dance Award - "Juice" by Young Franco featuring Pell
- Folk / Singer Songwriter Award - "Murder" by Jaguar Jonze
- Heavy Award - "White Lies" by These Four Walls
- Hip Hop / Rap Award - "Venom" by Jesswar
- Indigenous Award - "Twisting Words" by Miiesha
- Jazz Award - "Falling" by Danny Widdicombe with Kristin Berardi and Trichotomy
- Pop Award - "Dribble" by Sycco
- Regional Award - "Intentions" by Cloe Terare
- Remote Award - "Twisting Words" by Miiesha
- Rock Award - "Second" by Hope D
- Schools (Grade 6-12) - "Over & Out" by Amber Farnan
- Soul / Funk / R&B Award - "Twisting Words" by Miiesha
- World Award - "The Ether" by MZAZA
- Video Award - Dylan Dulcos, Rico Zhang for "Out of Touch" by Lastlings

People's Choice Awards

- Metro Venue of the Year - The Tivoli
- Regional Venue of the Year - The NightQuarter
- Festival of the Year - Woodford Folk Festival

== 2022 Queensland Music Awards ==
The 2022 QMAs were held at Fortitude Music Hall on 29 March 2022. the nominees were announced on 24 February 2022. The winners are listed below.

Major Awards

- Song of the Year - "My Ways" by Sycco
- Album of the Year - Love Signs by The Jungle Giants
- Billy Thorpe Scholarship - Cloe Terare
- Grant McLennan Lifetime Achievement Award - Dennis Conlin
- Emerging Artist of the Year - Zheani

Acknowledgements

- Highest Selling Single - "One Too Many" by Keith Urban and Pink
- Highest Selling Album - Cry Forever by Amy Shark

Self-Nominating Awards

- Blues / Roots Award - "Take Me Away" by Sue Ray
- Children's Music Award - "New Shoes" by The Mini Moshers
- Contemporary Classical Award - "Dreams of the Earth" by Corrina Bonshek
- Country Award - "God Took His Time on You" by Casey Barnes
- Electronic / Dance Award - "Foolproof" by Hayden James, Nat Dunn and Gorgon City
- Folk / Singer Songwriter Award - "Crybaby" by Asha Jefferies
- Heavy Award - "F... The Hollywood Cult" by Zheani
- Hip Hop / Rap Award - "Okay" by iiiConic
- Indigenous Award - "Letting Go" by Jem Cassar-Daley
- Jazz Award - "Sonorous Figurine" by Impulse Orchestra
- Pop Award - "My Ways" by Sycco
- Regional / Remote Award - "Foolproof" by Hayden James, Nat Dunn and Gorgon City
- Rock Award - "Most Hated Girl" by WAAX
- Soul / Funk / R&B Award - "Made for Silence" by Miiesha
- World Award - "Welcome to the Neighbourhood" (Taiwese: 就當家裡) by Matt Hsu's Obscure Orchestra
- Video Award - "Every Single Time" by Example featuring What So Not & Lucy Lucy (directed by Macario De Souza & Allan Hardy)
- Youth (ages 10–17) - "Parasite" by Paulina

People's Choice Awards

- Metro Venue of the Year - The Tivoli
- Regional Venue of the Year - NightQuarter
- Festival of the Year - Airlie Beach Festival of Music

== 2023 Queensland Music Awards ==
The 2023 QMA's occurred on 28 March 2023 at The Fortitude Music Hall. The winners are listed below.

Major Awards

- Song of the Year - "Backseat of My Mind" by Thelma Plum
- Album of the Year - Weirder & Weirder by Ball Park Music
- Billy Thorpe Scholarship - Neish
- Grant McLennan Lifetime Achievement Award - Lindy Morrison
- Emerging Artist of the Year - Yb.
- Carol Lloyd Award - Platonic Sex

Acknowledgements

- Highest Selling Single - "Sway My Way" by Amy Shark & R3HAB
- Highest Selling Album - All Or Nothing by Adam Brand

Self-Nominating Awards

- Blues / Roots Award - "All Riled Up" by Jen Mize & The Rough N' Tumble
- Children's Music Award - "Yes or No - A Song About Consent" by Cheekey Monkey Club
- Contemporary Classical Award - "Downhill Skiing" by Monique Clare
- Country Award - "Country Boys" by James Johnston
- Electronic / Dance Award - "Ripple" by Sycco
- Folk / Singer Songwriter Award - "Blackphemy" by Yb.
- Heavy Award - "Paranoid" by DZ Deathrays
- Hip Hop / Rap Award - "Cheques" by Khi'leb
- Indigenous Award - "Kalkani" by William Barton
- Jazz Award - "Forward Motion" by Trichotomy
- Pop Award - "Backseat of My Mind" by Thelma Plum
- Regional / Remote Award - "Nothing Wrong With That" by Sahara Beck
- Rock Award - "No Doz" by WAAX
- Soul / Funk / R&B Award - "Still Dream" by Miiesha
- World Award - "Space" by c and Menaka Thomas
- Video Award - "Purple Static by Mirrors" by Ben Wrigley
- Youth (ages 10–17) - "Happy Birthday" by Lottie Mcleod

People's Choice Awards

- Metro Venue of the Year - Fortitude Music Hall
- Regional Venue of the Year - Solbar
- Festival of the Year - Caloundra Music Festival

== 2024 Queensland Music Awards ==
The 2024 QMA's took place on 17 April 2024 at The Fortitude Music Hall. The event was hosted by Myf Warhurst and Michael Tuahine. The winners are listed below.

Major Awards

- Song of the Year - "King of Disappointment" by Jem Cassar-Daley
- Album of the Year - Jesus at the Gay Bar by Cub Sport
- Grant McLennan Lifetime Achievement Award - James Blundell

Acknowledgements

- Highest Selling Single - "Atmosphere" by Fisher and Kita Alexander
- Highest Selling Album - Acres by Brad Cox

Category Awards

- Blues / Roots Award - "Conversation" by Busby Marou
- Children's Music Award - "Dance Mode (Bluey)" by Joff Bush
- Contemporary Classical and Music for Stage Award - "Cybernylon" performed by Karin Schaupp; composed by Thomas Green
- Country Award - "Sometimes" by Tori Forsyth
- Electronic Award - "Songs About It" by Cub Sport
- Folk Award - "Cannonball" by Minor Gold
- Heavy Award - "My Mind Is Eating Me Alive" by DZ Deathrays
- Hip Hop Award - "Uptown" by Ozi Jarel
- Indigenous Award - "Spring to Life" by Tia Gostelow
- Jazz Award - "Le Baiser Salé" by Andrew Butt Trio
- Music for Screen Award - "Dance Mode (Bluey)" by Joff Bush
- Pop Award - "King of Disappointment" by Jem Cassar-Daley
- Regional / Remote Award - "Act Your Age" by LT
- Rock Award - "Everyone I Like Wants to Kill Themselves" by Felony
- Soul / Funk / R&B Award - "Compromise" by Sahara Beck
- World Award - "Falealili Manusamoa" by Taitu'uga
- Video Award - "Make It So Easy" by Jordan Briton featuring JUNO (Luis Campbell, Adam Hasa & Julian Panetta)
- Youth (ages 10–17) - "Sofa Bed" by Parker
- Export Award - Skin on Skin

People's Choice Venue Awards

- Metro Venue of the Year - Fortitude Music Hall
- Regional Venue of the Year - Kings Beach Tavern
- Festival of the Year - Gympie Music Muster
- Accessible Venue of the Year - Kingston Butter Factory Cultural Precinct

Scholarship

- Billy Thorpe Scholarship - Lottie McLeod
- Carol Lloyd Award - Jo Davie
- Dennis Conlon Scholarship - Kristal West
- Dalwood-Wylie Foundation Scholarship - Ethan Roberts
- Grant McLennan Fellowship - Georgia Potter

== 2025 Queensland Music Awards ==
The 2025 QMA's took place on 25 March 2025. For the first time, Album of the Year was selected by people's choice.

Major Awards

- Song of the Year - "Wake Up" by Young Franco featuring Master Peace
- Album of the Year - Between the Fires by Troy Cassar-Daley
- Lifetime Achievement Award - Christine Anu
- Export Achievement Award - Young Franco

Acknowledgements

- Highest Selling Single - "Beautiful Eyes" by Amy Shark
- Highest Selling Album - Sunday Sadness by Amy Shark
- Emerging Artist - Lottie McLeod

Category Awards

- Blues / Roots Award - "Illegal Things" by Full Flower Moon Band
- Children's Music Award - "Rubbish Bin Day" by The Wobble Bus
- Contemporary Classical and Music for Stage Award - "Untangled" by Nicole Murphy
- Country Award - "Making Cups of Tea" by Denvah
- Electronic Award - "Wake Up" by Young Franco featuring Master Peace
- Folk Award - "Spinning" by Asha Jefferies
- Heavy Award - "The Darkest Path" by Wildheart
- Hip Hop Award - "Walked Away" by Randy Thrill$
- Indigenous Award - "Big Container" by Jem Cassar-Daley
- Jazz Award - "River to Sea" by Kellee Green
- Music for Screen Award - "Legend Is Born" by Tristan Barton
- Pop Award - "Meant to Be" by Sycco
- Regional / Remote Award - Greta Stanley
- Rock Award - "Stay the Same" by Beddy Rays
- Soul / Funk / R&B Award - "I'm the Man" by JUNO
- World Award - "Gummy Bamarra (Grandsons Story)" by JUNGAJI
- Video Award - "Hocus Pocus" by Mallrat (by Tom Carroll)
- Youth (ages 10–17) - "Little Things" by Mackenzie May

People's Choice Venue Awards

- Metro Venue of the Year - Fortitude Music Hall
- Regional Venue of the Year - Sandstone Point Hotel
- Festival of the Year - Big Pineapple Festival
- Accessible Venue of the Year - The Station SC

Scholarship

- Billy Thorpe Scholarship - Miles Nautu
- Carol Lloyd Award - Dana Gehrman
- Dennis Conlon Scholarship - Rudy Matoy
- Grant McLennan Fellowship - Wolfe Peterson

== 2026 Queensland Music Awards ==
The 2026 QMA's took place on 22 April 2026.

Major Awards

- Song of the Year - "Kiss Me Like You're Leaving" by Jem Cassar-Daley
- Album of the Year - Like Love by Ball Park Music
- Lifetime Achievement Award - 4ZZZ
- Export Achievement Award - Hollow Coves

Acknowledgements

- Highest Selling Single - "Stay" by Fisher
- Highest Selling Album - Like Love by Ball Park Music

Category Awards

- Blues / Roots Award - "Way Too Long" by Lontano
- Children's Music Award - "I Don't Have a Chimney" by Joff Bush featuring Emma Dean
- Contemporary Classical and Music for Stage Award - "Memory in the Distant Hills" by Abigail Lui & Camerata
- Country Award - "Remember Me Like That" by Tori Darke
- Electronic Award - "Lose Control" by Young Franco
- Folk Award - "We Don't Talk" by The Dreggs
- Heavy Award - "Best Years of My Life" by Upsetter
- Hip Hop Award - "Count Us In" by Say True God?
- Jazz Award - "Bubble" by Dami Im
- Music for Screen Award - "Creek" by Georgia D'Arcy
- Music Video Award - " Breaking Into Heaven" by Loki Liddle & Joshua Tate (Selve)
- Pop Award - "Kiss Me Like You're Leaving" by Jem Cassar-Daley
- Rock Award - "Skyline" by DZ Deathrays
- Soul / Funk / R&B Award - "Bub" by BADASSMUTHA
- World Award - "Snow Flower" by Tenzin Choegyal

People's Choice Awards

- Metro Venue of the Year - The Tivoli
- Regional Venue of the Year - Miami Marketta
- Festival of the Year - Maleny Music Festival

Industry Excellence

- Accessible & Inclusive Venue - Den Devine
- Breakthrough Artist - Odd Mob
- Indigenous Artist of the Year - JUNGAJI
- Producer of the Year - Mallrat
- Regional Artist of the Year - Djawarray

Scholarship

- Billy Thorpe Scholarship - Frank and Louis
- Carol Lloyd Award - Paulina
- Dennis Mop Conlon Scholarship - Dubbzone
- Grant McLennan Fellowship - Banff
