= Harmony James =

Australian singer-songwriter

- James performing live with Shane Nicholson

Background information
- Born: Victoria, Australia
- Genres: Country, alternative country, folk
- Occupations: Singer, songwriter
- Years active: 2007–present
- Label: Warner
- Website: harmonyjames.com

Harmony James is an Australian singer-songwriter. Although James is often classified as a country artist, her music draws on many genres, including folk, pop, rock and blues. In 2006 Harmony first came to the attention of the music industry when she became the only Australian songwriter to have won the country category of the International Songwriting Competition, with her song "Tailwind". Her second single, "Somebody Stole My Horse", became Australian radio's second most played country song in 2008. spawned

== Early life ==
Born in Victoria, Australia to a Baptist preacher as one of twelve children, Harmony went to a private school and says she had "few friends". She read voraciously, eventually discovering the western novels of Louis L'Amour. James discovered traditional country music after a friend returned from Texas with records by Dolly Parton and The Judds. Soon after, James taught herself enough guitar to learn a few country songs and took to the streets singing to earn money.

She later ran a stock camp in the outback of Queensland and worked with cattle on the Northern Territory's Barkly Tableland. She left home to work as a jillaroo at some of the most remote cattle stations in southwestern Queensland, "covered in mud and blood, roughing it with the guys, working so hard I had biceps and thinking, 'This is not what my mother pictured for me'." A gig at a school fete in Goondiwindi led to an offer from the local publican and Harmony's songbook started filling, even as she continued her parallel life on the land, from the Cape to Tennant Creek, studying agriculture at The University of Queensland at Gatton and working as a welder "in a shed of 80 blokes." "My musical exposure was mostly church music until I got a job as a checkout chick and heard the radio," she says. "Now when I hang out with other musos they'll drop names and I'll just look at them blankly 'cause my music history starts in '95."

== Career ==
In 2007, James won the country category of the International Songwriting Competition, and began working with producer Herm Kovac on her debut EP, Harmony James.

Her debut studio album, Tailwind, was released in 2009. In 2009, James went on tour with Sara Storer and Kasey Chambers, performing "Tailwind" in major festivals. Chambers later recorded her own version of one of James' songs, "Good Enough."

James was nominated for Best Female Artist and Best Album for the CMAA Golden Guitar Awards in 2010 and won Best Female artist at the Victorian and Mildura Country Awards. and headlined her first Tamworth show.

Australian country music trio The McClymonts signed James in 2011 as an opening act for their first major Australian tour. James' 2011 single "Precious Little" became the second most played single on Australian radio.

In March 2011, James returned to the studio with Herm Kovac to work on her second album, Handfuls of Sky. The following November, James signed a worldwide publishing deal with Albert Music and a major record deal with Warner Music Australia on the same day.

Handfuls of Sky was released on 20 January 2012, along with the Harmony James Songbook, a portfolio of sheet music, lyrics, photos and stories. In 2012, James continued performing at festivals, tours, and shows with artists including Troy Cassar-Daley and Tim Freedman. The first single from Handfuls of Sky, "Pride", spent six weeks at number one, and the third single, "Emmylou's Guitar" spend three weeks at number one. 2012 also brought more recognition for James, as she won the country category at the Queensland Music Awards and was nominated for three 2013 Golden Guitar awards: Best Vocal Collaboration with Shane Nicholson for "Reach for You", Best Female Artist, and APRA Song of the Year for "Emmylou's Guitar".

In 2014, James released her third studio album, Cautionary Tales, for which James received CMAA 2015 nominations in the categories of Best Album, Best Female Artist, and Best Heritage Song for "Coal Seam Gas". Harmony toured extensively with Luke O'Shea and Pete Denahy and then later in the year with Lachlan Bryan.

Harmony opened for and performed with Emmylou Harris and Rodney Crowell on their Australian tour in 2015. The Courier Mail's Noel Mengel reviewed the show, saying about James' set, "When someone shines while singing alongside Emmylou Harris, you know that's a truly great singer. If you love this kind of music, you really need to check her out."

In late 2018, James' official Facebook page announced a new independent album Resignation. It was produced by Glen Hannah, music critic Bernard Zuel published a favourable review of the record, suggesting "James might be earning the right to be counted among the likes of the more experienced Gretchen Peters and Rosanne Cash". The Sunburnt Country Music blog said "despite its title, Resignation is not an album that sounds like defeat, retreat or weariness – it is a glorious manifestation of James's skills and talent, and it has been worth waiting for".

== Discography ==
=== Studio albums ===
Title	Details
Tailwind	Released: 2009; Label: Harmony James (HJA002); Format: CD, digital download
Handfuls of Sky	Released: January 2012; Label: Warner Music Australia (5310502782); Format: CD, digital download
Cautionary Tales	Released: June 2014; Label: Warner Music Australia (5419619852); Format: CD, digital download
Resignation	Released: February 2019; Label: Harmony James; Format: CD, digital download

=== Extended plays ===
Title	Details
Harmony James	Released: 2007; Label: Harmony James (HJA001); Format: CD, digital download

== Awards and recognition ==
Year	Awarding organization	Award	Result
2006	Northern Territory Songwriting Competition	Best song (Big News)	Won
2006	Tamworth Songwriters Awards	Amateur Country Traditional Song ("The Next Best Thing")	Won
2006	International Songwriting Competition	Best country song (Tailwind)	Won
2007	Queensland Gold Medallions	New Talent (Tailwind)	Nominated
2007	Southern Stars Award	Independent single of the year (Tailwind)	Nominated
2007	Musicoz awards	Best country artist (Tailwind)	Nominated
2007	International Songwriting Competition	Best country (Somebody Stole My Horse): Honourable mention	Nominated
2008	Tiara Awards	Female vocalist (Tailwind)	Nominated
2008	Victorian National Country Music Awards]	Female vocal, Independent Artist, Heritage song, Songwriter, Bush Ballad	Nominated
2008	SA Radio Wally Award	Best new act at Tamworth	Won
2008	Tiara Awards	Newcomer Recording Time award	Won
2008	Victorian National Country Music Awards	Best New Talent	Won
2008	Southern Stars Award	APRA/AMCOS Independent single of the year (Somebody Stole My Horse)	Nominated
2008	Southern Stars Award	Female vocalist (Somebody Stole My Horse)	Nominated
2008	Country Music Association of Australia	Golden guitar new talent (Tailwind)	Nominated
2009	Southern Stars Award	Female vocalist of the year (Fly)	Won
2010	Country Music Association of Australia	Album of the year (Tailwind)	Nominated
2010	Country Music Association of Australia	Female artist of the year (Precious Little)	Nominated
2010	Queensland Country Music Awards	Female artist of the year (Precious Little)	Won
2011	Australasian Performing Right Association	APRA Professional Development Award	Won
2012	Queensland Music Awards	Best Country Artist (Pride)	Won
2013	Country Music Association of Australia	APRA Song of the Year (Emmylou's Guitar)	Nominated
2013	Country Music Association of Australia	Vocal Collaboration with Shane Nicholson (Reach For You)	Nominated
2013	Country Music Association of Australia]	Female Artist of the Year	Nominated
2013	Country Music Channel Awards	Oz Artist of the Year	Nominated
2013	Country Music Channel Awards	Best Australian Videos (Don't Say It) (Emmylou's Guitar)	Nominated
2013	Queensland Music Awards	Best Country Artist (Emmylou's Guitar)	Won
2014	Country Music Association of Australia	Female Artist of the Year	Nominated
2014	Country Music Association of Australia	Best Album (Cautionary Tales)	Nominated
2014	Country Music Association of Australia	Best Heritage Song (Coal Seam Gas)	Nominated
