= Harmony James (EP) =

EP by Harmony James
- Released: 2007
- Recorded: Australia
- Genre: Country, roots
- Length: 13:47
- Label: Independent/ Shock records
- Producer: Herm Kovac

Harmony James chronology
Harmony James (2007)	Tailwind (2009)

Singles from Harmony James
- 1. "Tailwind (chart #7)" Released: 2007; 2. "Somebody Stole My Horse (chart #1)" Released: 2008; 3. "Home (chart #2)" Released: 2008

The Harmony James EP is the first recording by Harmony and features her breakthrough single "Tailwind".

"Tailwind" was the first Australian song ever to win the country category of the International Songwriting Competition. The second single "Somebody Stole My Horse" became Australia's second most played country song in 2008.

The EP features the song "Big News" which is unavailable on any other recording.

== Track listing ==
All tracks are written by Harmony James

No.	Title	Length
1.	"Tailwind"	3:25
2.	"Somebody Stole My Horse"	3:58
3.	"Big News"	2:49
4.	"Home"	3:29

Produced and engineered by Herm Kovac.

== Personnel ==
- Rudy Miranda: drums
- Ian Lees: bass
- James Gillard:acoustic guitar, backing vocals
- Glenn Hannah: electric guitars
- Duncan Toombs: electric guitars
- Michel Rose: pedal steel, imandolin
- Mick Albeck: fiddle
- Shanley Del: backing vocals
