= 8 Ball Aitken =

Australian musician (born 1981)

- Born: Eightball Aitken; 9 June 1981 (age 45); Brisbane, Queensland, Australia
- Occupations: Songwriter, singer
- Instruments: Vocals
- Years active: 2004–present
- Labels: Phoenix Movement Records, Red Rocker Records
- Website: www.8ballaitken.com

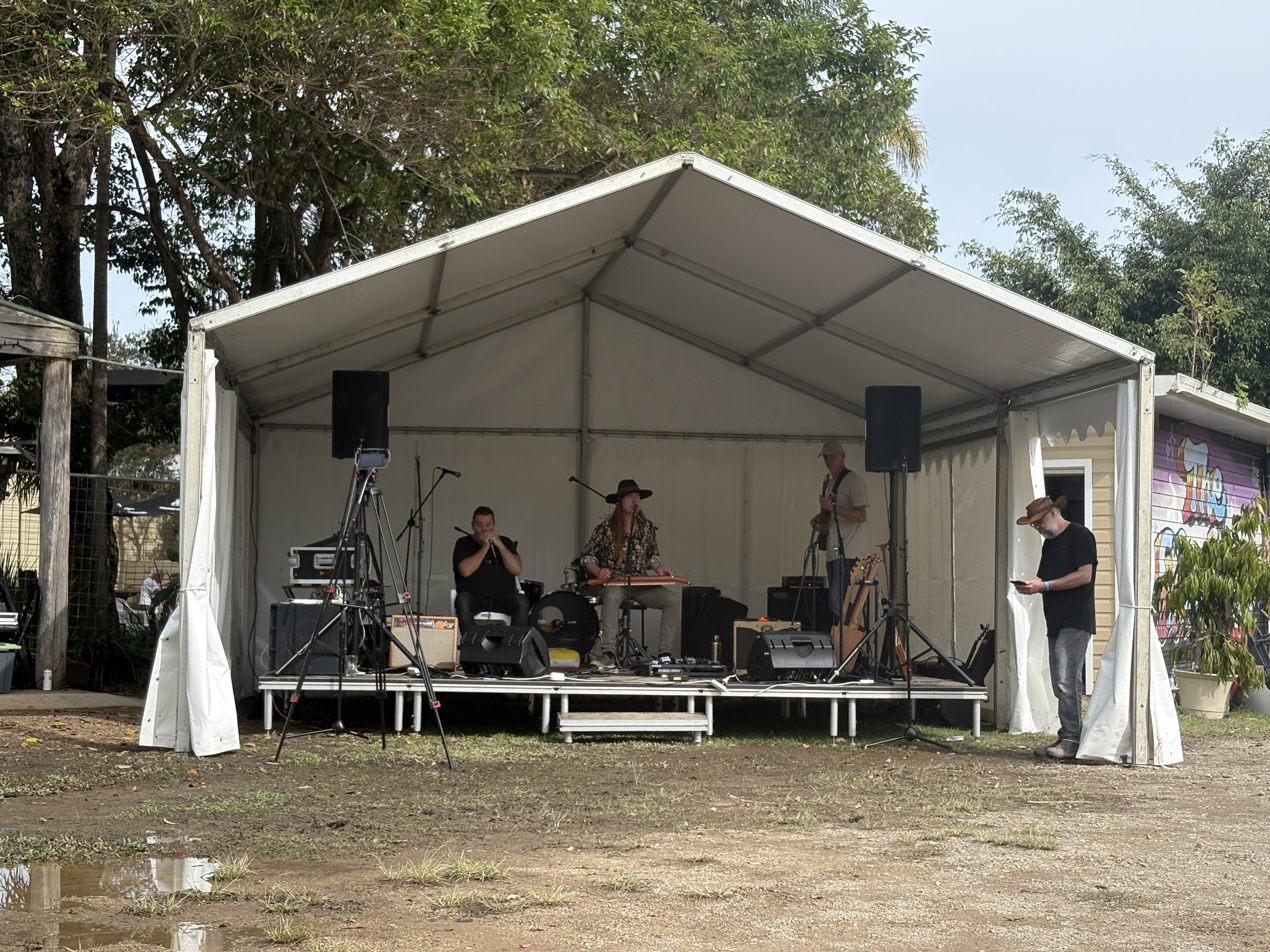
Aitken and others performing at the BilliBoxFest at the Billinudgel Hotel, June 2026

Eightball Aitken (born 9 June 1981), known professionally as 8 Ball Aitken, is an Australian singer, songwriter, and guitarist. 8 Ball plays blues, swamp-blues, swamp-rock, alternative country, and Americana music. He is notable for his fusion of Australian blues and country music.

Aitken is the founder of the Mt Coot-tha Songwriters Festival.

== History ==
At the 2008 Q Song Awards, Aitken won Blues and Roots Song of the Year for "Yellow Moon". At the same awards in 2009, "Outback Booty Call" won Country Song of the Year.

Aitken's song "Cowboy Movie" was nominated for the Australian Blues & Roots Song of the Year at the APRA Music Awards of 2009.

Aitken third studio album Rebel with a Cause was produced by Garth Porter. The album produced two top 10 country hits, "Cyclone Country" & "Hands on Top of the Wheel".

In 2013, Aitken had a one song in the Australian Country Music Radio Charts with song "She's Going to Mexico, I'm Going to Jail".

== Discography ==
=== Studio albums ===
Title	Details
Behind the 8 Ball	Release date: 2004; Label: Phoenix Movement Records (8BALL002); Formats: CD, DD
Odd Ball In	Release date: 2006; Label: Phoenix Movement Records (Odd Ball In); Formats: CD, DD
Rebel with a Cause	Release date: 2009; Label: Red Rocker Records, MGM (9324690029488); Formats: CD, DD
The Tamworth Tapes	Release date: 2011; Label: Red Rocker Records (8BALL004); Formats: CD, DD
Alive in Tamworth	Release date: 2012; Label: Red Rocker Records (8BALL005); Formats: CD, DD
Southern Hemisphere	Release date: 2013; Label: Red Rocker Records (8BALL008); Formats: CD, DD
The New Normal	Release date: January 2015; Label: Red Rocker Records (8BALL009); Formats: CD, DD
Swamp Blues	Release date: February 2018; Label: Red Rocker Records (8BALL010); Formats: CD, DD, LP, streaming
Swamp Blues 2	Release date: April 2020; Label: Red Rocker Records (8BALL011); Formats: CD, DD, LP, streaming
Ice Cream Man	Release date: 23 April 2021; Label: Red Rocker Records; Formats: DD, streaming

=== Compilations albums ===
Title	Details
A Bluer Shade of Blue	Release date: 2013; Label: Red Rocker Records; Formats: CD, DD
8 Ball Aitken	Release date: 2016; Label: Red Rocker Records; Formats: CD, DD, LP, streaming

== Awards and nominations ==
=== APRA Awards ===
The APRA Awards are held in Australia and New Zealand by the Australasian Performing Right Association to recognise songwriting skills, sales and airplay performance by its members annually. Aitken has been nominated for one award.

Year	Nominee / work	Award	Result	Ref.
2009	"Cowboy Movie"	Australian Blues & Roots Song of the Year	Nominated	
2019	"High Water" (8 Ball Aitken / Guthrie Kennard)	Song of the Year	Shortlisted	

=== Q Song Awards ===
The Queensland Music Awards (previously known as Q Song Awards) are annual awards celebrating Queensland, Australia's brightest emerging artists and established legends. They commenced in 2006.

Year	Nominee / work	Award	Result (wins only)
2008	"Yellow Moon"	Blues and Roots Song of the Year	Won
2009	"Outback Booty Call"	Country Song of the Year	Won
