= 26 (band) =

Australian band

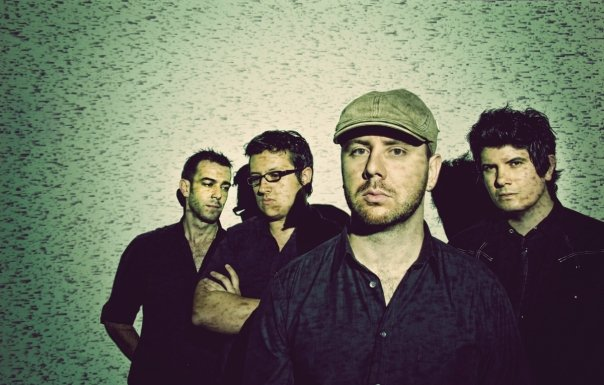

Background information
- Origin: Brisbane, Queensland, Australia
- Genres: Alternative rock, indie rock
- Years active: 2004–present
- Labels: Floodboy Records; MGM Distribution
- Members: Nick O'Donnell; Drew Fellows; Ross Duckworth; Iain Wilson
- Website: http://www.26theband.com

26 (also written as 26 (The Band), [26] and 26(Twenty Six)) is an Australian musical outfit founded in 2004 by friends Nick O'Donnell (lead vocals/guitar) and Drew Fellows (keyboardist/vocals), who later recruited Ross Duckworth (bass/vocals) and Iain Wilson (drums/vocals). Originally categorised as indie rock, 26 has since employed a variety of guest artists and choirs to produce a sound that is unique to the band.

== History ==
The band's first album, The King Must Die, was recorded by O'Donnell before he had a band and was released in Australia through Floodboy Records and MGM Distribution in 2005. The album received national airplay and The King Must Die was honoured as the feature album on Sydney radio station FBI 94.5 FM's The Album Show. With the band's growing popularity, 26 toured Australia in 2006 for the release of their single, "Friendly Fire", which went on to win the 2006 Queensland Song Award for Best Rock Song and was also a finalist in The Courier-Mail People's Choice Awards. The single also received airplay on national youth network Triple J and further exposure on FBI 94.5 FM.

With the release of their second album, Births, Deaths & Marriages, in 2008, 26's track "Aloha" was featured on the 3 website. That same week, 26 was chosen as one of only forty acts to showcase at Queensland's 2008 Big Sound Conference, one of the most respected and fastest-growing music business events in the Asia-Pacific region.

In 2010, 26 toured the US, Canada, Hong Kong and the UK, as well as performing at the MUSEXPO 2010 in West Hollywood on 26 April.. In August 2011, 26 returned to the northern hemisphere for an extensive national UK tour, including performances at the Y-Not Festival and the Edinburgh Festival.

26's third album, Sunshine Salvation, was released on 26 October 2012, with "The Outside" announced as the album's first single. To launch their 2012 album, Sunshine Salvation, the band played an intimate, start-to-finish pre-release show for their Brisbane-based friends, families and fans at the Black Bear Lodge in Fortitude Valley, Queensland.

== Band members ==
- Nick O'Donnell: lead vocals, guitar
- Drew Fellows: keys, vocals
- Ross Duckworth: bass, vocals
- Iain Wilson: drums, vocals

== Discography ==
=== Albums ===
Title	Details
The King Must Die	Released: July 2005; Label: Floodboy Records; Format: CD, DD
Births, Deaths & Marriages	Released: 24 May 2008; Label: Floodboy Records; Format: CD, DD
Sunshine Salvation	Released: 26 October 2012; Label: Floodboy Records; Format: CD, DD

== Awards ==
=== Q Song Awards ===
The Queensland Music Awards (previously known as Q Song Awards) are annual awards celebrating Queensland, Australia's brightest emerging artists and established legends. They commenced in 2006.

Year	Nominee / work	Award	Result (wins only)
2006	"Friendly Fire"	Rock Song of the Year	Won
