= The King Must Die (album) =

Studio album by 26
- Released: 14 July 2005 (Australia)
- Genre: Indie rock, Alternative
- Length: 44:52
- Label: Floodboy Records

26 chronology
The King Must Die (2005)	Births, Deaths & Marriages (2008)

The King Must Die is the 2005 debut album by Australian indie rock band 26. It was released through Floodboy Records in July 2005. At the time, the band consisted of only two members: Nick O'Donnell and Drew Fellows. O'Donnell sampled and mixed the music from his previous band, Floodboy.

== Track listing ==
All tracks are written by 26

The King Must Die
No.	Title	Length
1.	"Rescue Me"	4:10
2.	"Angel"	3:51
3.	"The King Must Die"	4:33
4.	"Started"	3:33
5.	"Live With It"	4:40
6.	"Life's First Lesson"	5:41
7.	"No Fixed Address"	5:02
8.	"Letter to the Editor"	4:34
9.	"Coming Around"	4:35
10.	"Broken"	4:13

== Personnel ==
=== 26 ===
- Nick O'Donnell – lead vocals, guitar
- Drew Fellows – keys, vocals
- Iain Wilson – drums, vocals

=== Additional musicians ===
- Greg Cathcart – (track 2, 5 and 10)
- Andrew Doonican – (track 2, 5 and 10)
- Iain Wilson – (track 2, 5 and 10)
- Jonathan Shakhovskoy – vocals (track 10)
- Steve James – drums (track 5)
