= Tailwind (album) =

Studio album by Harmony James
- Released: 2009 (Australia)
- Recorded: Australia
- Genre: Country roots
- Length: 62:25
- Label: Warner Music Australia
- Producer: Herm Kovac

Harmony James chronology
Harmony James (2007)	Tailwind (2009)	Handfuls of Sky (2012)

Singles from Tailwind
- 1. "Fly" Released: 2009; 2. "Precious Little" Released: 2009; 3. "Pretty" Released: 2010; 4. "Good Enough" Released: 2010; 5. "Painted Pony" Released: 2011

Professional ratings
Review scores
Source	Rating
CD Universe	5/5 stars

Tailwind is the debut studio album of Australian singer songwriter Harmony James.

The songs were inspired in the time Harmony spent alone in the Barkly Tableland region of the Northern Territory.

Tailwind was re released in 2012 through Warner Music Australia which included two bonus tracks one being a cover of the Oasis song "Don't Look Back in Anger".

== Track listing ==
All tracks are written by Harmony James, except where noted

No.	Title	Length
1.	"Come on Back To Me"	03:08
2.	"Tailwind"	03:23
3.	"Fly"	03:45
4.	"Drifter (Pfrimmer/Jordan)"	03:22
5.	"Painted Pony"	02:33
6.	"Precious Little"	03:29
7.	"Good Enough"	03:15
8.	"Send Down An Angel (Moorer/Primm)"	03:42
9.	"Somebody Stole My Horse"	04:32
10.	"Pretty"	03:01
11.	"The Only Good Thing"	03:40
12.	"Cold Cold Rage"	03:36
13.	"Some People Give (with Kevin Bennett)"	03:50
14.	"The Way That I Felt"	03:15
15.	"Home"	03:32
16.	"Call of the Currawong"	03:51
17.	"Don't Look Back in Anger (Noel Gallagher) (BONUS EDITION)"	03:55
18.	"The Next Big Thing (BONUS EDITION)"	02:25

Produced and engineered by Herm Kovac

== Personnel ==
- Glen Wilson: drums
- Rudi Miranda: drums
- Ian Lees: bass
- Glenn Hannah:electric guitars, mando guitar
- Stuart French:acoustic guitars, electric guitars
- James Gillard: acoustic guitars, electric guitars, upright bass, backing vocals
- Travis Collins: electric guitars, banjo, backing vocals
- Michel Rose: pedal steel, dobro, mandolin
- Tim Crouch: fiddle, mandolin
- Mick Albeck: fiddle
- Marcus Hartstein: cello
- Lisa Pallandi: violins
- Clayton Doley: Hammond organ, melotron
- Bill Risbey: piano
- Randall Waller: backing vocals
- Shanley Del: backing vocals
- Kevin Bennertt: duet on Some People Give
- Hank Kovac: cowbell, xylophone, penny whistle
