= Sahara Beck =

Australian singer and songwriter

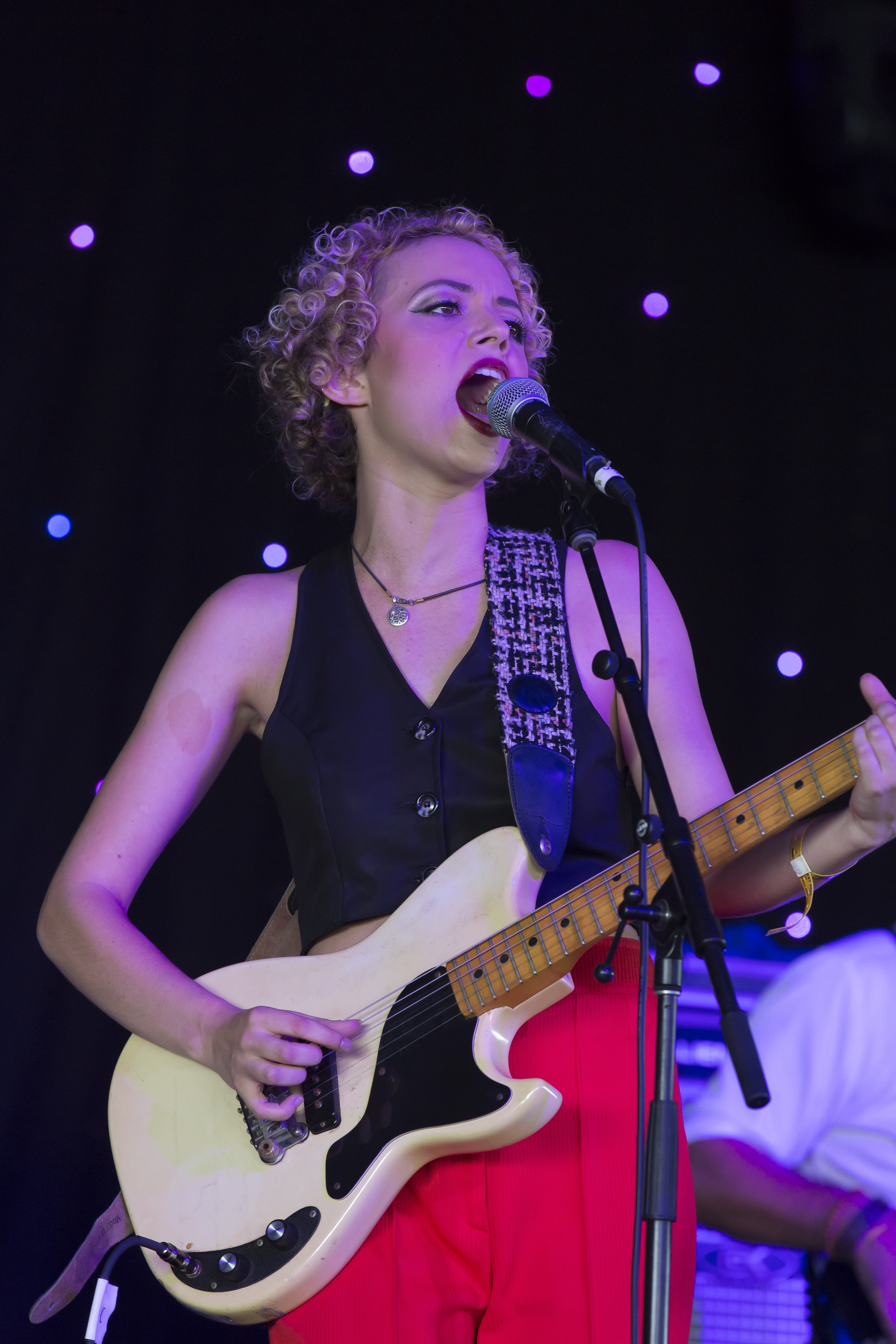
- Sahara Beck performing at Byron Bay Bluesfest 2016

Background information
- Born: 1996 (age 29–30); Darwin, Northern Territory, Australia
- Origin: Sunshine Coast, Queensland, Australia
- Genres: Folk rock; Blues rock; Indie rock
- Occupation: Singer-songwriter
- Years active: 2009–present
- Label: Dew Process,
- Website: www.saharabeck.com.au

Sahara Beck (born 1996) is an Australian singer and songwriter, from the Sunshine Coast. She has released three studio albums and four EPs. Beck has won multiple Music Awards.

== Early life ==
Beck was born in Darwin, Northern Territory in 1996, and comes from a musical family. As a child, she used to watch Mary Poppins which inspired Beck to sing. She took on vocal lessons, piano lessons, guitar lessons and trumpet lessons.

== Musical career ==
=== 2009–2011: Early years and Volume One ===
By the age of 13 she dazzled the local musician, Harii Bandhu, by joining to sing with him on her Dad's birthday party. Bandhu took on a mentoring role for Beck and has given her opportunities to perform on live gigs, as she has written numerous original songs which Bandhu later refined and recorded nine with Geir Brillian. In 2011 her debut album was then formed, Volume One when she was only 15 years of age upon release.

=== 2011–2015: You Could Be Happy and Bloom ===
In 2012, Beck moved to Brisbane to continue High School at the Music Industry College, she had made a quick impression in the local industry when two of her songs were nominated and taking home an award at the Queensland Music Awards 2012. She has earned a lot of radio play on Australian broadcasters such as ABC Coast FM, HOT 91.1, Triple J, Triple J Unearthed and numerous overseas broadcasters such as in the UK, Germany and New York City.

She was nominated for Song of the Year at the 2012 Queensland Music Awards for her song "You Could Be Happy" and won an award for the category: Schools (Grade 6 -12).

In 2013 she released her EP You Could Be Happy, which contains her singles, "Bang Bang Bang" and "C'mon Man You're Dead".

She supported her second EP, Bloom released in 2014, with her Australian Bloom Tour featuring her hit singles "Brother, Sister" and "Pretender" and receiving "an impressive amount of radio play across a number of stations."

Beck won an award in the Queensland Music Awards 2015 in the peoples choice for Most Popular Female.

In 2015, Beck went on tour with Katie Noonan with their Songs That Made Me album. She also sang alongside Noonan for a track she recorded with Grammy Award nominee Sia.

=== 2016–present: Panacea and touring ===
In 2016 Beck released Panacea, featuring the single "Here it Comes". The new album was followed by further touring, including appearances with Xavier Rudd and The Cat Empire.

Beck sang "Somewhere Only We Know", backed by the Queensland Symphony Orchestra for a 2017 Queensland Tourism television advertising campaign.

In August 2018, Beck released a new single titled "Here We Go Again" under new label Dew Process, and later released a music video for it too. She later announced her national Here We Go Again Tour that was performed in September and November of that year.

On 28 March 2019, Beck released a new single titled "I Haven't Done a Thing Today", produced by ARIA Award-nominated Tony Buchen. A lyric video was later released on 3 April. Sahara beck is slated to appear at Noosa Alive! hosted by Triple J on 24 July.

== Discography ==
List of studio albums
Title	Album details
Volume One	Released: 2 October 2011; Label: CD Baby
Panacea	Released: 22 April 2016; Label: Sugarrush Records / Create Control
All Attention on Your Emotion	Released: 27 October 2023; Label: Sahara Beck

=== Extended plays ===
List of extended plays
Title	EP details
You Could Be Happy	Shelved: 31 October 2013; Label: Sahara Beck
Bloom	Released: 10 October 2014; Label: Sahara Beck
Queen of Hearts	Released: 10 April 2019; Label: Sahara Beck
And Her Kryptonite	Released: 17 June 2022; Label: Sahara Beck

=== Singles ===
Title	Year	Album
"Bang Bang Bang"	2013	You Could Be Happy
"C'mon Man You're Dead"	2013	You Could Be Happy
"Brother, Sister"	2014	Bloom
"Pretender"	2014	Bloom
"Here It Comes"	2016	Panacea
"Here We Go Again"	2018	Queen of Hearts
"I Haven't Done a Thing Today"	2019	Queen of Hearts
"Queen of Hearts"	2019	Queen of Hearts
"We'll Be Home Tonight" (with Luke & Friends)	2020	Non-album single
"Crave Me"	2021	Non-album single
"Valley Nights" (with Tia Gostelow and Hope D)	2021	Non-album single
"Kryptonite"	2021	And Her Kryptonite
"Stillness"	2022	And Her Kryptonite
"Teenage Dirtbag"	2022	And Her Kryptonite
"Nothing Wrong With That"	2022	And Her Kryptonite
"Mr Breezy"	2022	Non-album single
"Like You"	2023	All Attention on Your Emotion
"Hunter"	2023	All Attention on Your Emotion
"Thinking Twice"	2023	All Attention on Your Emotion
"Trip"	2023	All Attention on Your Emotion
"Hard to Tell"	2023	All Attention on Your Emotion
"Compromise"	2023	All Attention on Your Emotion
"Special"	2024	TBA

Innocence Back with Tim Finn https://en.wikipedia.org/w/index.php?title=Sahara_Beck&action=history

== Awards and nominations ==
=== Queensland Music Awards ===
The Queensland Music Awards (previously known as Q Song Awards) are annual awards celebrating Queensland, Australia's brightest emerging artists and established legends. They commenced in 2006.

Year	Nominee / work	Award	Result (wins only)
2012	"You Could Be Happy"	Schools (Grade 6-12) Song of the Year	Won
2015	Herself	The BOQ People's Choice Award Most Popular Female	Won
2016	"Mother Mother"	Folk Song of the Year	Won
2019	"Here We Go Again"	Regional Song of the Year	Won
2023	"Nothing Wrong With That"	Regional Song of the Year	Won
2024	"Compromise"	Soul / Funk / R&B Award	Won

=== Vanda & Young Global Songwriting Competition ===
The Vanda & Young Global Songwriting Competition is an annual competition that "acknowledges great songwriting whilst supporting and raising money for Nordoff-Robbins" and is coordinated by Albert Music and APRA AMCOS. It commenced in 2009.

Year	Nominee / work	Award	Result
2019	"Here We Go Again"	Vanda & Young Global Songwriting Competition	3rd
