= Select Music =

- Type: Entertainment group
- Industry: Music & Entertainment
- Founded: 2005
- Headquarters: Sydney, NSW, Australia
- Products: Music & Entertainment
- Website: www.selectmusic.com.au/

Select Music is an independent music and entertainment company in Australia.

Select Music was founded in 2005 by agents Stephen Wade & Rob G. Its artists include Ball Park Music, Passenger and The Veronicas.
