= Cautionary Tales (album) =

Studio album by Harmony James
- Released: June 2014 (Australia)
- Recorded: Australia
- Genre: Country roots
- Length: 52:00
- Label: Warner Music Australia
- Producer: Herm Kovac

Singles from Cautionary Tales
- 1. "Skinny Flat White" Released: 2014; 2. "30,000 FT" Released: 2014

Professional ratings
Review scores
| Source | Rating |
|---|---|
| Jolene: Country Blog | 5/5 stars |
| Country HQ | 5/5 stars |

Cautionary Tales is the third studio album from Australian singer songwriter Harmony James.

== Track listing ==
| No. | Title | Length |
|---|---|---|
| 1. | "30,000FT" | 3:59 |
| 2. | "Cold Western Wind" | 4:33 |
| 3. | "Faraway Eyes" | 3:58 |
| 4. | "What You Gonna Do About Me" | 2:22 |
| 5. | "Skinny Flat White" | 3:05 |
| 6. | "Coal Seam Gas" | 3:27 |
| 7. | "While You Were Sleeping" | 4:10 |
| 8. | "Something Something" | 3:20 |
| 9. | "In Another Life" | 2:58 |
| 10. | "Winners in War" | 3:27 |
| 11. | "Icebergs" | 4:36 |
| 12. | "Coming Home Again" | 4:08 |
| 13. | "Pancho's Boy" | 7:28 |

Produced and engineered by Herm Kovac.

== Personnel ==
- Steve Fearnley: drums
- Jeff McCormack: bass
- Glenn Hannah: electric guitars, mando guitar, acoustic guitar
- Stuart French: acoustic guitars, electric guitars
- Mark Sholtez: acoustic guitar
- Michel Rose: pedal steel
- Tim Crouch: fiddle, mandolin, cello
- Bill Risby: grand piano, Wurlitzer piano
- Brian Lizotte: trombone
- Angus Gomm: trumpet
- James McCrow: French horn
- Randy Kohrs: dobro
- Clayton Doley: Hammond organ
- Mike Carr: backing vocals
- Drew McAlister: backing vocals
- Travis Collins: backing vocals
- Brooke McClymont: backing vocals
- Hank Kovac: percussion, harmonica
