= Popular entertainment in Brisbane =

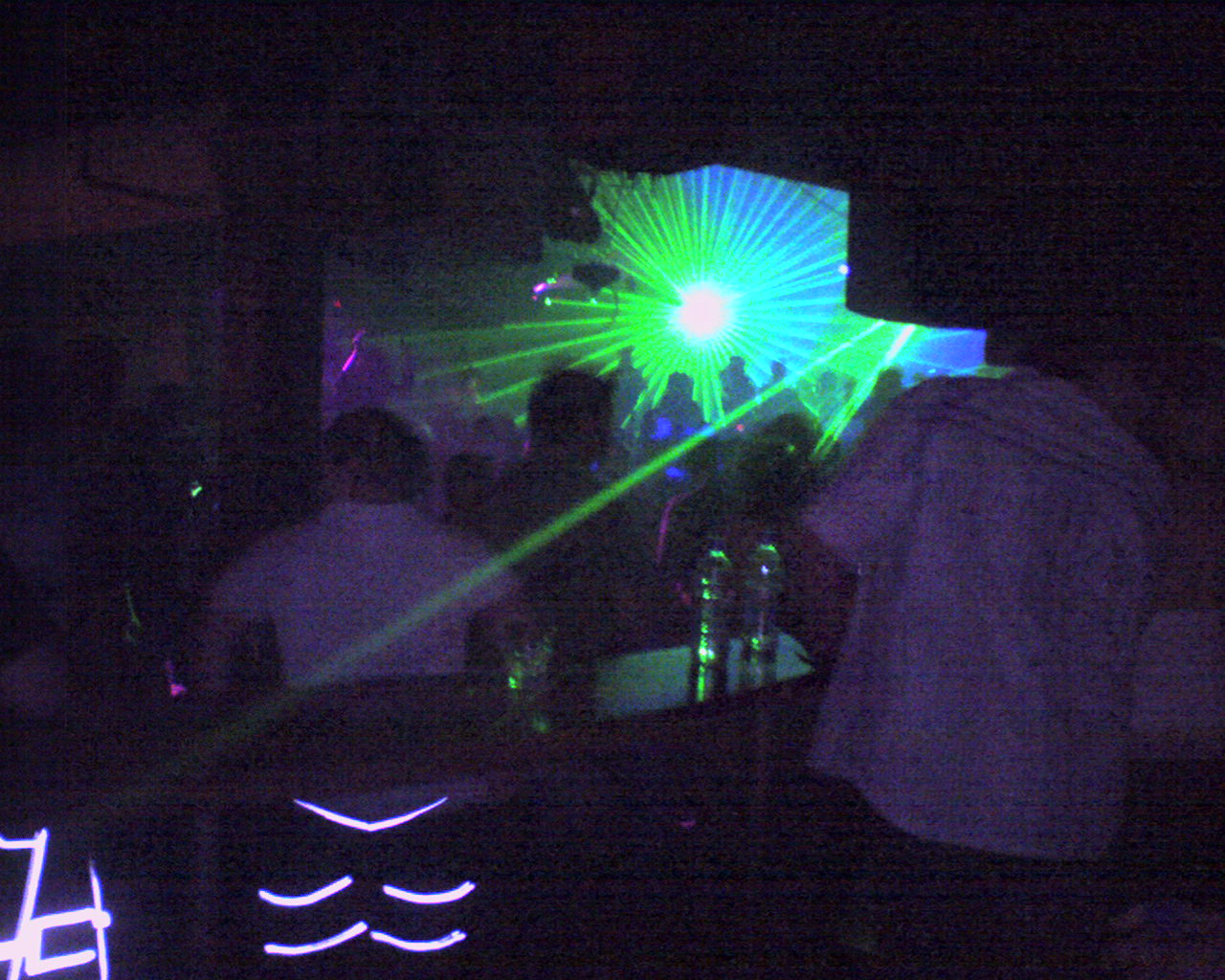
Inside the Family Nightclub

Popular entertainment in Brisbane covers contemporary music; nightclubs, pubs, and other entertainment venues; and local media.

== Nightlife and general entertainment venues ==
Brisbane's nightlife is a thriving and varied mix of pubs, clubs, themed bars, and various other venues. There are two main areas of interest: The "City" (CBD) and the "Valley" (Fortitude Valley). While the city typically consists of venues catering to those with a more traditional taste in music or atmosphere, the Valley typically offers a drastically different, more cosmopolitan selection of places. The Brisbane City Council has tried to preserve the Valley as an entertainment precinct with the introduction of Valley Special Entertainment Precinct:

Following consultation with residents, music venues and commercial business operators within Fortitude Valley, the Valley Special Entertainment Precinct commenced on 1 July 2006. Its introduction is one of the first steps in achieving the aims of the Valley Music Harmony Plan.

The Queen Street Mall in the CBD offers nightclubs and bars, as well as the Conrad Treasury Casino. Nightclubs in the city include Strike Bowling, a nightclub with bowling lanes, and the lounge bar Jade Buddha. More conventional bars include The Victory. Mana Bar is a cocktail bar and video gaming lounge in Fortitude Valley.

West End, a cosmopolitan suburb about 2 kilometres (1.2 mi) south-west of the CBD, plays host to a wide variety of street dining, music, bars like the Rumpus Room, the Lychee Lounge, Uber, The HiFi, Ill Manor and others. RSL clubs and local pubs around the suburbs occasionally have live acts. The Bearded Lady in the West End is a venue that is home to local, national and international independent music, of all genres of music ranging from metal to country.

Located within the Gallery of Modern Art (GOMA), the Australian Cinémathèque is a dedicated film facility offering a diverse program of screenings, including international cinema, influential filmmakers, rare prints, restorations and silent films with a live musical accompaniment. Screenings take place Wednesday and Friday nights, as well as matinees on weekends. Most screenings are free admission.

== Live music ==
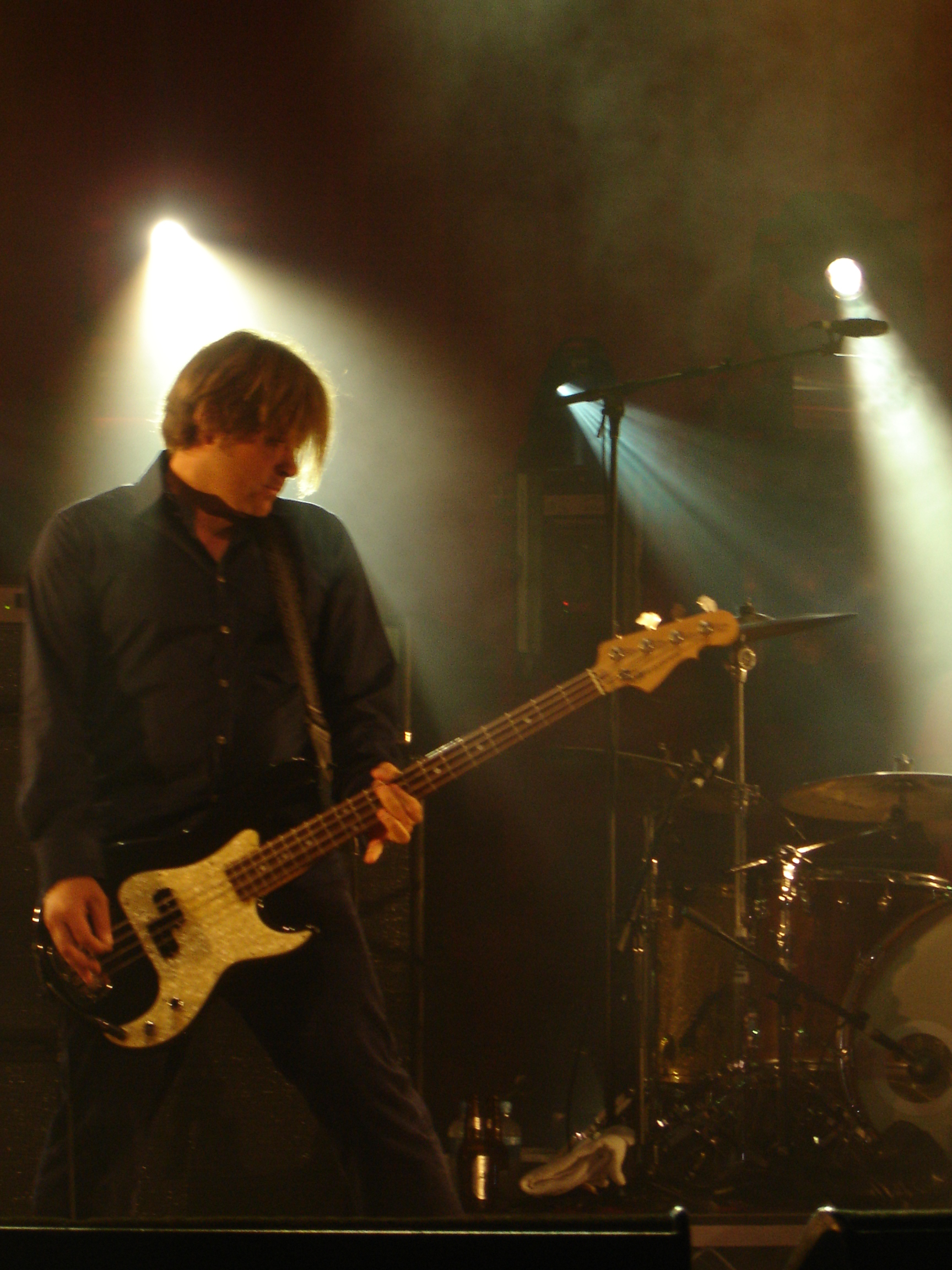
Member of Powderfinger on stage in Brisbane, 2005

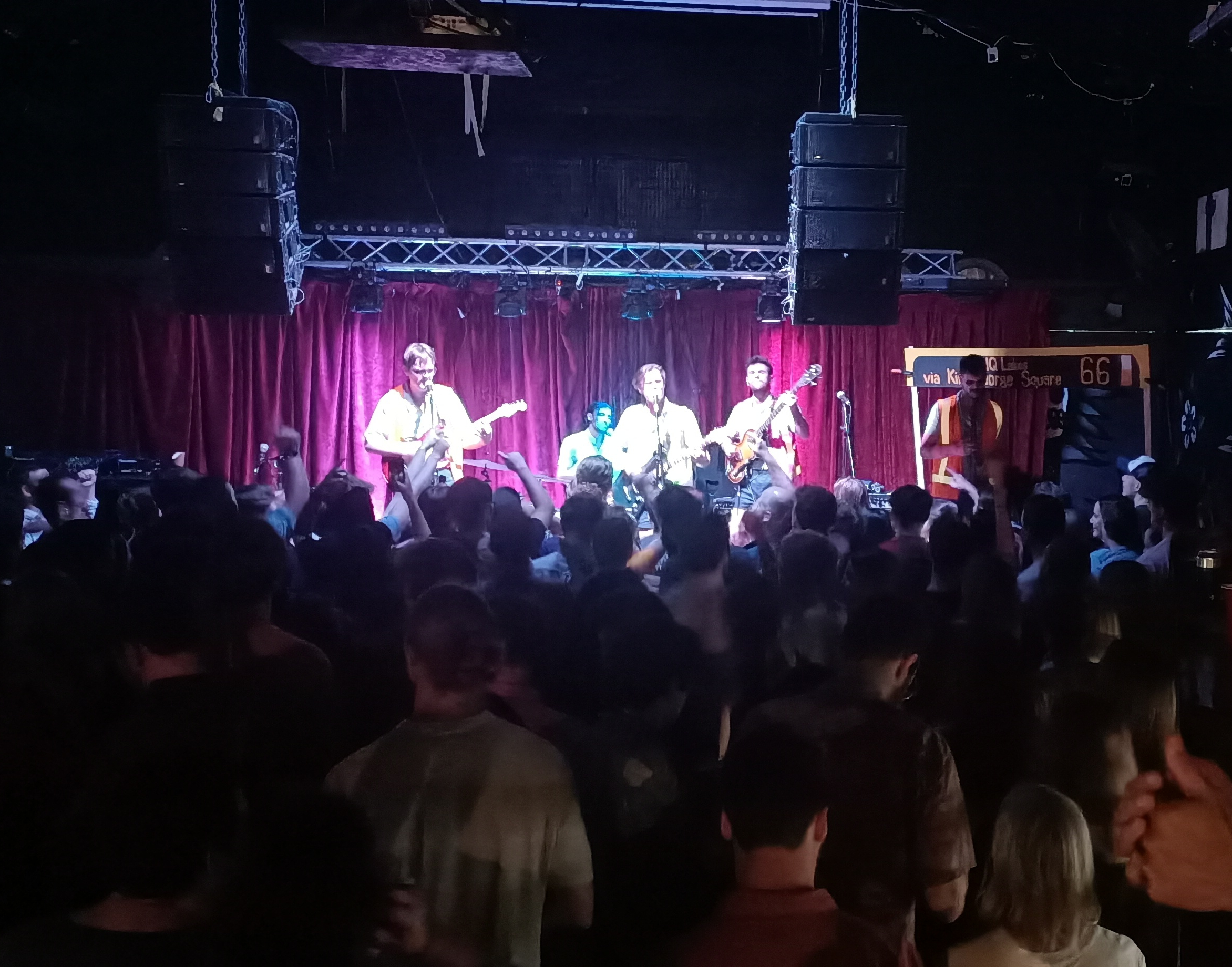
The Mangroves performing at the Unpacking Brisbane 100th Episode "Brisbane Spectacular" on 1 April 2022

In the early 1990s, many young people were either studying or unemployed. Sharehousing with friends in old Queenslander-style housing of inner-city Brisbane, pre-gentrification, was the cheapest option to move out of home. Generation X identified strongly with film and music, but most especially music. Independent, alternative music was on the rise, globally and locally, and Brisbane's 'indie' music credentials were noteworthy. It was the birthplace of pioneering public radio station 4ZZZ in the mid-1970s, and produced famous bands such as The Saints and The Go-Betweens.

Brisbane's live music scene hosts a variety of genres, from Dance to rock, pop and hip hop.

Brisbane has been home to a number of national music festivals, including Future Music Festival, Jet Black Cat's Nine Lives Festival, Stereosonic, FOMO, Wildlands, Mountain Goat Valley Crawl, BIGSOUND, Soundwave, St Jerome's Laneway Festival and Valley Fiesta. Livid was also a home-grown alternative rock music festival held annually from 1989 to 2003.

Brisbane's live music scene has long been supported by independent record stores such as Rocking Horse Records which originally opened in 1975, Catalogue Music, Jet Black Cat Music, Kill the Music, and Skinny's Music, and Brisbane music can be seen and heard online at Before Hollywood or Raw Audio – online TV for Brisbane Music.

=== Music venues ===
Brisbane Festival Hall, now closed, hosted performances for many major tours by visiting overseas artists, including The Beatles on 28 June 1964.

Cloudland was a famous Brisbane music and dancing venue located in Bowen Hills. The venue hosted thousands of dances and concerts in the 50s, 60s and 70s and was demolished in 1982.

Most major concerts are held in the Brisbane Entertainment Centre in Boondall, the Brisbane Convention & Exhibition Centre adjacent to the South Bank Parklands or the centrally located Riverstage. Other major events (including raves) are hosted at the RNA Showgrounds (when not hosting the Ekka) and more recently, Suncorp Stadium. Queensland Sport and Athletics Centre at Nathan has hosted a number of music concerts. The Princess Theatre in Woolloongabba hosts concerts by independent bands, and is an affiliate of the Tivoli.

The Brisbane Powerhouse is an iconic venue that hosts a range of music events.

==== Smaller venues ====
Many live music venues are found in Fortitude Valley and surrounding areas since the popular Mary Street and Brisbane Festival Hall city venues were closed. The Zoo and Ric's Cafe both opened in 1992. As of 2024 Ric's Cafe is called Ric's Cafe Bar, Ric's Bar, or just Ric's. Its venues include the original bar, Ric's Front Bar; Ric's Upstairs (for parties), and the Backyard, which is the largest space, catering for over 250 guests patrons.

Other venues include The Arena, The Tivoli, The Fort, The Step Inn, The Empire Hotel, Black Bear Lodge, King Lear's Throne, The Brightside, and The Press Club.

The Rev closed down in September 2006. The Alley Bar closed down in March 2008.

In 2023, bar and live music venue O'Skulligan's on Warner Street, Fortitude Valley, announced that due to noise complaints they would no longer be hosting live music events in their bar. The last performance took place on 11 February 2023 as part of the 2023 Mountain Goat Valley Crawl, with one of the last bands to perform being Dog God.

On 1 May 2024, The Zoo, which had opened in 1992, announced that it would close their doors in July, citing that the "current model is broken". On 8 October 2024, it was announced that The Zoo would reopen in November under new ownership, renamed The Crowbar, after being taken over by the owners of The Crowbar in Sydney.

== Media ==
In 1975, Brisbane's first FM radio station began broadcasting from a studio at the University of Queensland Student Union. 4ZZ (later 4ZZZ) became a catalyst for the development of original music in the city. Bands such as The Saints, The Go-Betweens, The Riptides, and The Laughing Clowns established an ecosystem for alternative music that continues to flourish.

Rave Magazine was a free weekly magazine which covered the entertainment scene in Brisbane from 1991 to 2012, printing 1047 issues within its lifespan.

Time Off was a free weekly music magazine that started at the University of Queensland and progressed to a city-wide free magazine. The magazine was incorporated and rebranded into The Music in 2013 along with other Australian music magazines Drum Media and Inpress. The Music's print edition was put on hold due to the COVID-19 pandemic.

Scene Magazine, later Scenestr, is a free monthly national music and entertainment magazine. Since starting in 1993, Scenestr has now become a digital-first company, but still distributes 12,500 print magazines throughout Brisbane, Ipswich, Toowoomba, Sunshine Coast and the Gold Coast.

== Walk of Fame ==
Located in the Brunswick Street Mall is the Valley Walk of Fame. Similar to the Hollywood Walk of Fame, the Valley Walk of Fame are bronze star plaques made to recognise Queensland's most significant bands and musicians. Originally there were only ten plaques erected in 2008, the musicians on these plaques were Keith Urban, The Saints, Powderfinger, Custard, The Go-Betweens, Savage Garden, The Bee Gees, Railroad Gin, and Regurgitator.

New plaques are added yearly during the Qld Music Awards Showcase at the Valley Fiesta Festival. Plaques erected after the original ten include bands such as Violent Soho, Timothy Carroll, Tim Steward, David McCormack, Troy Cassar-Daley, Bernard Fanning, Hungry Kids of Hungry, The Grates, Amy Shark, Ball Park Music, Robert Forster, Cub Sport, Emma Louise, The Jungle Giants, Thelma Plum, The Gin Club, Sycco, and Clea.

== References in popular music ==
Brisbane is featured in the song "It's Hot in Brisbane but it's Coolangatta", recorded in 1953 by Gwen Ryan, Claude Carnell's Orchestra and additional vocals from Doug Roughton's Hokey Pokey Club.

A vast majority of Brisbane bars, pubs, and R.S.L.s are named in The Chat's song I've Been Drunk in Every Pub in Brisbane off of their 2022 album Get Fucked. In order the pubs listed are: The Zoo (Fortitude Valley), The Boundary Hotel (West End), Wynnum R.S.L. (Wynnum), The Breakfast Creek Hotel (Albion), The Grand Central Hotel (Central Station, Brisbane), The Caxton (Petrie Terrace) and The Stock Exchange (Brisbane).

The Mangroves are a Brisbane-based indie rock band that primarily releases songs about the city and suburbs of Brisbane, as well as its culture. Their live shows are a celebration of Brisbane culture, including cutouts of the Brisbane 66 route bus, copies of the Courier Mail being thrown into the crowd during their song "Is it True or Did You Read it In the Courier Mail?", and debates which side of Brisbane is the best. Songs of theirs include "What's Better Than Brisbane?", "Red Hill Sharehouse", "Expo 88", "New Farm Park", "Pig City", "2032" and "Northside Southside". On their second album, It's the Humidity, they recorded a cover of Elvis' "Viva Los Vegas", changing the lyrics to "Viva Brisvegas". The band was created on an episode of the Brisbane-based podcast, Unpacking Brisbane.

Violent Soho from Mansfield, Queensland, reference the major Brisbane road Cleveland Road in their song "Liars" off of their seminal 2013 album Hungry Ghost.

== Musicians based in Brisbane ==
A	An Horse -- Aneiki
B	Ball Park Music -- Bee Gees -- Beddy Rays -- The Belligerents -- Pearly Black -- Boxcar -- The Boat People -- Butterfingers -- The Butterfly Effect -- The Boat People - Babaganouj
C	The Cairos -- Caligula's Horse -- Kev Carmody -- The Chats -- Confidence Man -- The Creases -- Cub Sport -- Custard
D	Emma Dean -- Andrew Dowling -- Dead Letter Circus -- Drawn from Bees -- DZ Deathrays -- Disentomb -- Dune Rats
E	
F	Fun Things -- Bernard Fanning -- Fat Mans Cleavage -- Full Fathom Five
G	Edward Guglielmino -- The Gin Club -- GANGgajang -- Gina G -- George -- The Go-Betweens -- Giants of Science -- The Grates -- The Goon Sax -- Gospel of the Horns
H	Darren Hayes -- Hatchie -- Hope D -- Hungry Kids of Hungary -- Hunz -- Halfway (band) -- Matt Hsu's Obscure Orchestra
I	Intercooler -- Iron On -- Isis -- Indecent Obsession
J	Jesswar -- The Jungle Giants -- The John Steel Singers
K	
L	Last Dinosaurs -- The Leftovers -- Little Scout
M	Mallrat -- Misery -- Mop and The Dropouts -- The Mouldy Lovers -- The Mungabeans -- Kate Miller-Heidke
N	No Money Enterprise -- Not From There
P	Portal -- Powderfinger -- Chris Pickering
Q	
R	Regurgitator -- Rhubarb -- Rocketsmiths -- Riptides -- Margret RoadKnight -- Resin Dogs -- Rick Price -- Railroad Gin
S	The Saints -- Savage Garden --Sheppard -- Screamfeeder -- The Sunnyboys -- Sakkuth -- Tara Simmons -- The Survivors
T	Billy Thorpe -- Joel Turner -- Tulipan -- The Tellers
U	Keith Urban
V	Vancouver Sleep Clinic -- Vampire Lovers (band) -- The Veronicas -- Violent Soho
W	WAAX -- Brandon Woods
X	Xero
Y	Yves Klein Blue

== See also ==
- Brisbane Philharmonic Orchestra
- Brisbane Punk Rock
