= Edward Guglielmino =

Edward Guglielmino B.CI, Cert IV, Mres, Grad Dip TL.
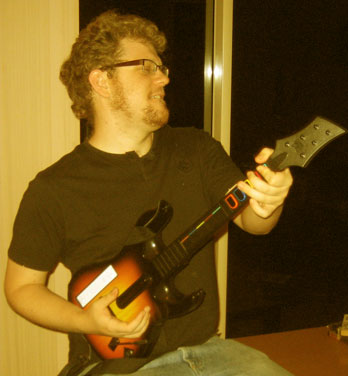

Background information
- Born: 17 April 1983 (age 43); Sydney, New South Wales, Australia
- Genres: Post-punk, alternative rock, garage rock, avant garde
- Occupations: Singer-songwriter, multi-instrumentalist, writer, academic
- Instruments: Guitars, keyboards, vocals
- Years active: 2001–present
- Label: Mucho Bravado
- Website: edg.ug

Edward Guglielmino is an Australian musician, disc jockey, public speaker, academic, and blogger based in Hobart, Tasmania, Australia. He currently is a member of musical groups the Thin Kids and Lost of Love, but is best known for his own solo music career and has commercially released three albums.

== Background ==
Guglielmino has toured Australia extensively and has played selected shows in New York City, Berlin, and London. He has received national airplay in Australia and selected radio play in Berlin Germany, Guglielmino has released two critically acclaimed records Late at Night and Sunshine State - aside from these records he regularly uploads demos to his SoundCloud.

Guglielmino writes quirky guitar pop in the Brisbane tradition of bands like Custard and The Go-Betweens. Guglielmino has also participated in Brisbane community music events such as The Songs of Applewood (2009) project and the Independent Music Project (2011 & 2013) In 2007, 2012 and 2013 he was shortlisted for the esteemed Grant Mclennan Fellowship. In 2013, he won the inaugural Grant McLennan Song of the Fellowship Award for "Mary".

In 2014, Guglielmino completed a Masters of Arts via research at the Queensland University of Technology. He was then hired as a school teacher by Music Industry College to teach their business program. He has also lectured at Queensland University of Technology and The University of Queensland as a sessional academic for six years. His thesis "A Qualitative Study of Small-Scale Artist Run "Indie" Music Business in Brisbane" is available online via the QUT EPrints facility He has a PhD scholarship at QUT and is currently researching the ecologies of capital in the music industry. He lectured the unit "Sex, Drugs and Rock and Roll" at the Queensland University of Technology.

== Musical career ==
=== 2003–2007: Formative years ===
While doing his undergraduate degree at QUT, Guglielmino composed the soundtrack to three plays: 'Speak Truth To Power' (2004), 'The Ruling Class' (2004) and 'Modlovex' (2005) as well as two short films: 'Giraffe' (2003) and 'Love Coincidence' (2004). Early on in his career, he was pursuing multiple artistic endeavours, spending time studying visual art in New York in 2005, it was here Guglielmino played his first solo shows. Guglielmino started to become infamous in Brisbane for his stage antics and his prolific online persona in 2006 having a large following on the website Myspace with celebrity subscribers of his blog including Anton Newcombe of The Brian Jonestown Massacre and Angie Hart of Frentie!. During this time Guglielmino also released many DIY albums on CDR., In 2007, his notoriety was further fuelled by a controversial publicity stunt involving Lost of Love, a band which he co-fronted and co-founded with James O'Brien of The Boat People and solo musician Jackie Marshall. The band was turned off following a noise complaint where they turned down the volume after being approached by police at one particular gig. Later in 2007 he released a home recorded EP Tacky Ep, and soon after he travelled to Berlin and played a number of shows with Berlin solo artist Kurt Kreikenbom. While in Berlin the single off Tacky Ep was played on indie music radio station Motor FM.

Selected songs from this era of music are on Guglielmino's SoundCloud.

=== 2008–2009: Late at Night ===
In 2009, Guglielmino signed a deal with management company Mucho Bravado and has since commercially released three albums and four singles. He signed to release his first critically acclaimed album Late at Night (2009) through MGM Distribution. Two singles off this record 'Fail With Me' and 'Rhythm of Life' were played on Triple J and received simultaneous B rotation on FBi Radio, spot rotation on 3RRR and Edge FM 102.1. Late at Night was in the 4ZZZ top ten most played for two weeks and the clip for 'Fail With Me' was played on Rage (TV program). During this time Guglielmino also played selected shows in Berlin and London.

=== 2010–2011: Live at Cori's ===
He returned to his DIY roots in 2010 and released digital-only live album Live at Cori's, an intimate, live performance which was also filmed. Many of the videos directed by Jaymis Loveday are on Vimeo and YouTube. Soon after, he traveled to New York and played a number of solo shows. In 2011, he released a single '"In The Morning", it received national airplay on Triple J and he toured Australia, Berlin and London. It was in Berlin, Guglielmino met Sydney musician Richard Cuthbert who is best known for his band Cuthbert and the Nightwalkers.

=== 2012: Sunshine State ===
In May 2012, Guglielmino released his second album Sunshine State on vinyl, compact disc, WAV and to all streaming media. The album launch, which was at the Judith Wright Arts Centre was listed at one of the top five gigs to attend in Brisbane by Noel Mengel of the Courier Mail Soon after that show, Guglielmino toured the east coast of Australia with his band The Show. Sunshine State received critical acclaim in Time off magazine where it was Album of the Week, Rave and local newspaper The Courier Mail. Key tracks received extensive play on Brisbane community radio station 4ZZZ where it was the number one most played album in late May. It continued to be in the top 20 for the next eight weeks. On FBi Radio in Sydney, "Swam in the Water" received C rotation while "In The Morning" and "Walking My Way" both received numerous plays on national radio broadcaster Triple J and "Death of Me" also received rotation on digital radio station Triple J Unearthed.

Guglielmino's Sunshine State Tour included a notable show where he supported Brian Chase from the Yeah Yeah Yeahs at Flinders Bar in Sydney. He also recorded a live track with the renowned Australian musician Kate Miller-Heidke for the web program 'Press Record'. At the end of his 2012 tour, Guglielmino was announced for shortlist for the prestigious Grant McLennan Fellowship. In December 2012 Noel Mengel of The Courier Mail listed Sunshine State in his top ten albums of the year.

=== 2013: Split Cassingle with Richard Cuthbert ===
After meeting Richard Cuthbert in Berlin in 2011, Guglielmino immediately started planning a split cassette-only single with him. The release was delayed due to several setbacks involving Cuthbert and Guglielmino's management firms who both disagreed with the intended format. Cuthbert's training as a lawyer eventually allowed both artists to receive approval from their firms for release, with a slight compromise, the cassettes had to include download codes. The press release for the cassette and tour were revealing of the internal frictions including quotes from their management firms criticising the release.

=== Current ===
Guglielmino continues to play solo shows and occasionally with Shem Allen and various drummers.

== Notable bands ==
=== Edward Guglielmino & The Show ===
Guglielmino has worked with a number of musicians in his band Edward Guglielmino & The Show which features a rotating line-up of notable band members. Past members include noted producer and keyboardish for Holy Holy Matt Redlich, Sam Schlencker (Skinny Jean), Luke Foran, Shem Allen (Skinny Jean ), Hik Sigimoto, Mel Tickle (Little Scout, Holiday Party, PYNES), Miro Mackie (producer, Little Scout), Kirsty Tickle (Exhibitionist, Party Dozen) and his manager Ben Preece.

He currently plays with Shem Allen and occasionally Hik Sigimoto, while earlier in his career much of his band were members of The Boat People.

Solo artist Rowley Cowper joined the band in 2010 to play bass and keys.

=== Scavenger Panda ===
Guglielmino is currently playing and collaborating with Grammy award-winning producer Mike Howlett, in a band called Scavenger Panda.

=== The Thin Kids ===
In late 2009, Guglielmino started a project with British journalist Everett True (responsible for unearthing such artists and bands as Nirvana, and Daniel Johnston) labeled The Thin Kids. Also starring Maggie Collins and Scotty Regan of The Gin Club, the band received attention from Mess and Noise, NME and various other music magazines and street press

In February 2011, it was announced that The Thin Kids would tour with British chart topper and star of American Netflix series GLOW, Kate Nash, They collaborated with her on two double A-Side vinyl releases: "The Thin Kids Theme" / "Warriors in Woolworths" (2012, for UK Record Store Day) and "Free My Pussy" / "Free Pussy Riot Now!".

=== Lost of Love ===
Lost of Love is a band which Guglielmino co-fronted and co-founded with James O'Brien of The Boat People and solo musician Jackie Marshall. The band did not rehearse and were largely known to uniquely improvise every show they played.

== Discography ==
Title	Format	Year	Detailsotes
The Last 8 Months (Independent)	EP	2002	Edward Guglielmino (solo, only 100 printed)
Ed Is Under (Independent)	EP	2003	Edward Guglielmino (solo, only 100 printed)
The Learning Curve (Independent)	LP	2005	Edward Guglielmino (solo, only 100 printed, still available digitally)
This Is 0.8 (Independent)	EP	2005	Edward Guglielmino (solo, only 100 printed)
Tacky - A Very Tacky EP (Independent)	EP	2006	Edward Guglielmino (solo)
You Can Eat A Pineable (Independent)	LP	2006	Lost of Love
Crushed by a Late Night Dream (MGM Distribution / Mucho Bravado)	Single	2007	Edward Guglielmino (solo)
Late At Night (MGM Distribution / Mucho Bravado)	LP	2009	Edward Guglielmino (solo)
Settle Down With Me (MGM Distribution / Mucho Bravado)	Single	2009	Edward Guglielmino & The Show
(We Are) The Thin Kids (Independent)	EP	2010	The Thin Kids
Live In Cori's Backyard (Mucho Bravado)	LP	2010	Edward Guglielmino, Nicoletta Panebianco, Matthew Redlich
In The Morning (Mucho Bravado)	Single	2011	Edward Guglielmino & The Show
Sunshine State (Mucho-Bravado)	LP	2012	Edward Guglielmino & The Show
Thin Kids Theme Song / Warrior In Woolworth's	Double A-Side	2012	The Thin Kids and Kate Nash
Free My Pussy / Free Pussy Riot Now!	Double A-Side	2013	The Thin Kids and Kate Nash
Nothing to Hide / Thought About My Problems	Cassingle	2013	Edward Guglielmino and Richard Cuthbert

== Controversy ==
In 2009 he was issued with legal action by General Electric who asked Guglielmino to change his logo, which was a parody of the General Electric's logo. Guglielmino complied, only to reveal a Lucky Goldstar parody logo. The story featured in City News, on ABC Radio Brisbane's breakfast show and also in the weekend edition of the Courier Mail.

== See also ==
- Popular entertainment in Brisbane
- The Thin Kids
- Little Scout
- The Boat People
- Kate Miller-Heidke
