= Taylor Parkes =

British journalist

Taylor Parkes (born 30 April 1972) is a British journalist. He is best known for his music journalism which appeared in Melody Maker from 1993 to 1998.

Parkes was a champion of Saint Etienne, Pulp, Manic Street Preachers and the Romo scene, something he supported along with colleague Simon Price. He was critical of Britpop groups that he considered to be unadventurous but was for a time largely positive towards Oasis.

He also contributed to Careless Talk Costs Lives and Plan B, both edited by his former Melody Maker colleague Everett True, as well as 1990s pop-cultural magazine Ikon and early 2000s music monthly Bang.

He has since written for the football magazine When Saturday Comes and The Quietus, a music and pop culture website, and has contributed to Jarvis Cocker's Sunday Service on BBC Radio 6 Music.

In 2015, Parkes wrote an article for The Quietus on Jeremy Corbyn's campaign for leadership of the British Labour Party titled "Last House On The Left", in which he criticized Corbyn's leadership and several of his policies. Parkes also used the article to voice his opposition to what he termed the "Mainstream Radical Left" for what he described as its "determination to indulge Islamic radicalism, even as its self-appointed warriors cut their comrades down", in reference to the Charlie Hebdo shooting. The article was praised by Nick Cohen, Polly Toynbee, Gaby Hinsliff and Marie Le Conte.

After the 2019 UK General Election, Parkes appeared on Oz Katerji's podcast to discuss Corbyn's defeat.

Parkes is a co-creator of and contributor to Chart Music, a podcast which provides analysis and commentary of classic episodes of Top Of The Pops.
