= Ben Salter =

Australian musician (born 1977)

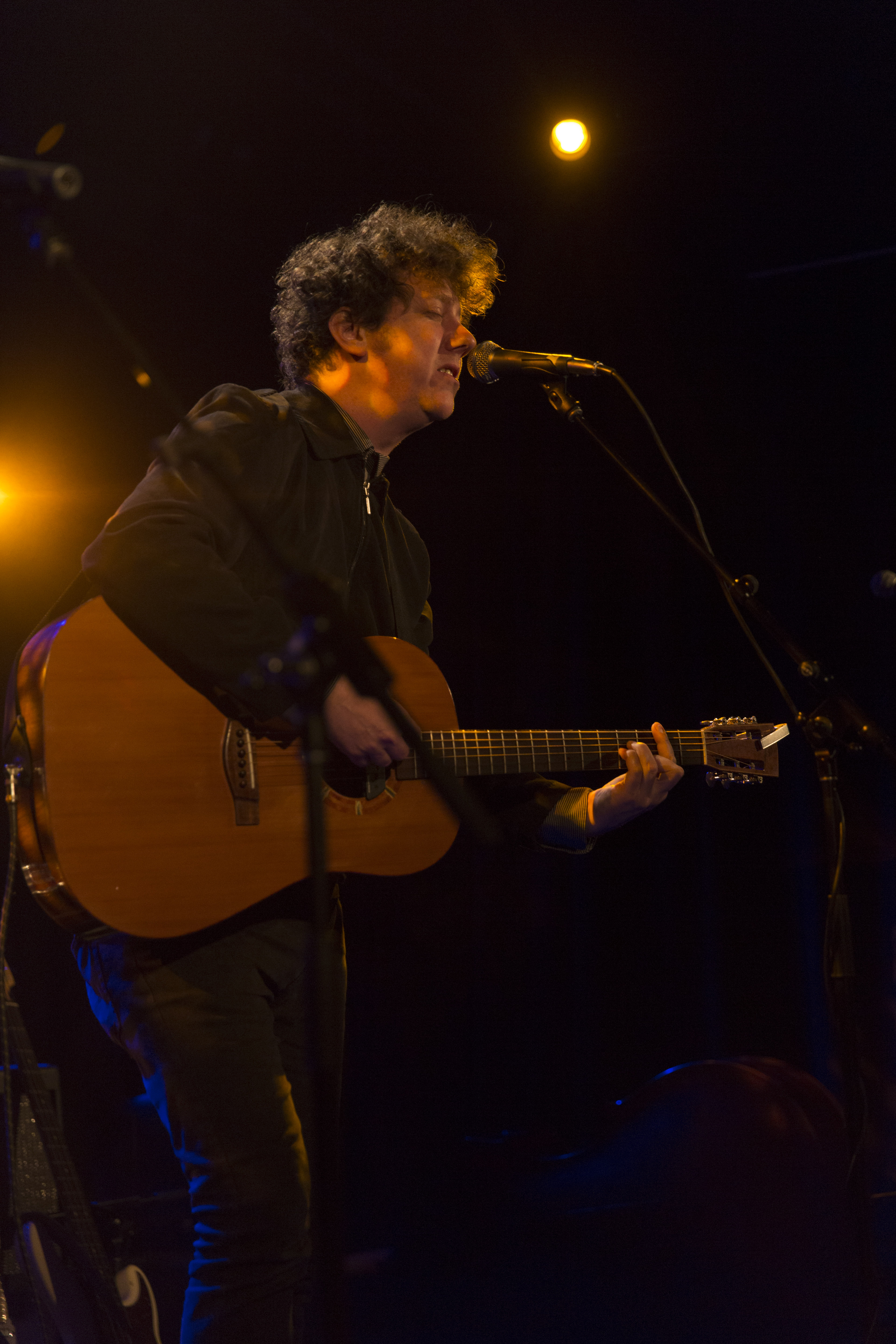
- Oxford Arts Factory, 21 November 2015

Background information
- Born: 23 March 1977 (age 49); Townsville, Queensland, Australia
- Genres: Indie pop
- Instruments: Vocals, guitar
- Years active: 1999–present
- Label: ABC Music
- Website: www.bensalter.com.au

Ben Salter (born 23 March 1977) is an Australian musician currently based in Hobart, Tasmania, in addition to being a member of bands including Giants of Science, The Gin Club, The Wilson Pickers, Hownowmer and The Young Liberals.

== Bands ==
In 2008 Ben Salter on banjo and vocals formed a country blues band the Wilson Pickers alongside John Bedggood on fiddle, mandolin and backing vocals, Andrew Morris on acoustic guitar and vocals, Sime Nugent on harmonica, guitar and backing vocals and Danny Widdicombe on resonator guitar and vocals.

== Solo career ==
Ben has played hundreds of shows around the world as a solo artist. In 2012 he travelled for five months around Europe collaborating with as many songwriters and artists as possible, playing shows in Spain, Italy, Germany and Iceland. From that extensive tour he was inspired to release his European Vacation EP.

As a solo artist he has supported musicians including Cat Power, Built To Spill, Something for Kate, Violent Femmes, Augie March, and Tim Rogers.

Ben won the 2012 album of the year for The Cat at the Queensland Music Awards. The album was recorded and produced with Gareth Liddiard and Robert F. Cranny.

On 23 June 2014 he was invited to perform at the APRA Awards (Australia).

In 2015, The Stars My Destination was released through ABC Music. to warm critical acclaim. In 2017 Back Yourself was also released by ABC Music.

== Discography ==
| Title | Details |
|---|---|
| The Cat | Released: August 2011; Label: BPS (BPS001); Format: CD, digital download |
| Ben Salter Live | Released: July 2012; Label: BPS; Format: download |
| European Vacation | Released: July 2013; Label: ABC; Format: download |
| The Stars My Destination | Released: May 2015; Label: ABC (4716423); Format: CD, download, LP |
| Back Yourself | Released: October 2017; Label: ABC (5786899); Format: CD, download, LP |
| The Mythic Plane | Released: December 2019; Label: BPS; Format: LP |
| Summer of the Loud Birds | Released: March 2020; Label: BPS (BPS 666); Format: Digital, LP |

== Awards ==
=== APRA Awards ===
The APRA Awards are held in Australia and New Zealand by the Australasian Performing Right Association to recognise songwriting skills, sales and airplay performance by its members annually.

| Year | Nominee / work | Award | Result | Ref. |
|---|---|---|---|---|
| 2023 | "My Heart Is in the Wrong Place" by Vika & Linda (Ben Salter) | Most Performed Blues & Roots Work of the Year | Pending | |

=== Music Victoria Awards ===
The Music Victoria Awards, are an annual awards night celebrating Victorian music. They commenced in 2005.

| Year | Nominee / work | Award | Result |
|---|---|---|---|
| Music Victoria Awards of 2015 | The Stars My Destination | Best Album | Nominated |

=== National Live Music Awards ===
The National Live Music Awards (NLMAs) commenced in 2016 to recognise contributions to the live music industry in Australia.

| Year | Nominee / work | Award | Result | Ref. |
|---|---|---|---|---|
| 2023 | Ben Salter | Best Folk Act | Nominated | |
| 2023 | Ben Salter | Best Live Voice in Tasmania | Nominated | |

=== Queensland Music Awards ===
The Queensland Music Awards (previously known as Q Song Awards) are annual awards celebrating Queensland, Australia's brightest emerging artists and established legends. They commenced in 2006.

| Year | Nominee / work | Award | Result (wins only) |
|---|---|---|---|
| 2008 | "Ten Paces Away" (performed by The Gin Club) | Song of the Year | Won |
| 2008 | "Ten Paces Away" (performed by The Gin Club) | Rock Song of the Year | Won |
| 2008 | "You Me and the Sea" | Folk and Ballad Song of the Year | Won |
| 2011 | Ben Salter for "The Coward" | The Courier-Mail People's Choice Award Most Popular Male | Won |
| 2012 | The Cat | Album of the Year | Won |
