= The Thin Kids =

Band from Brisbane, Australia

The Thin Kids are a band from Brisbane. Featuring British music critic Everett True, Triple J personality Maggie Collins, musician Edward Guglielmino and drummer from The Gin Club Scotty Regan. Ryan Jarman from The Cribs once listed them as something "Right now I love."

== History ==
The first Thin Kids show at the Troubadour was well attended and was reviewed on "Mess and Noise" They supported The Cribs in 2010, and Kate Nash on her 2010 tour, and again in 2011.

== See also ==
- Edward Guglielmino
- Everett True
- Maggie Collins
- The Gin Club
