= Musexpo =

MUSEXPO is an international music, media and technology conference based in Burbank, Los Angeles. It was created in 2005 by former DJ and music industry journalist Sat Bisla. It is still in operation as of July 2023.

== List of artists ==
Animal Alpha, Bloodpit, Breed 77, Cass Fox, Drawn from Bees, Deep Insight, Embrace, Engerica, Evermore, Goldenhorse, Gomo, Infadels, Intercooler, Kwan, Missy Higgins, Mudmen, Pilot Speed, Poets of the Fall, Reamonn, Resin Dogs, Spazzys, The Boat People, The Gift, The Temper Trap, Tina Dico, MENEW, Katy Perry, Jessie J and Losing Focus.
