= Rocketsmiths =

Australian indie rock band

- Origin: Brisbane, Queensland, Australia
- Genres: Indie rock
- Labels: Sevens
- Members: Dom Miller; Ianboy Apuli; Luke Hefferan; Dan Michael; Brenty Finch
- Past members: Brock Smith
- Website: rocketsmiths.com

The Rocketsmiths are an indie rock band from Brisbane, Australia. They have released three EPs to date. They released their debut EP, Act One. Scene One., in June 2006 with Sevens Records, and have since released two other EPs, Meet Horace and Clyde and Parts, Pieces.

== History ==
The Rocketsmiths all met at secondary school, and later formed a band under the name the John Citizens. They played at pubs and other venues to gain popularity, and an audience; it is said that their live shows are "energetic, quirky and mature". They changed their name a few weeks after the release of their first EP, Act One. Scene One., to the Rocketsmiths. According to Brett Collingwood of Rave Magazine, this is because "some blokes from Sydney asserted they had that band name first. Not to worry; it's goodbye John Citizens, hello the Rocketsmiths!" But as much as this annoyed the Rocketsmiths, it gave them a catchier name which people seemed to like better.

The Rocketsmiths then set off on a tour to further advertise the band, through Brisbane, Sydney, Melbourne and Adelaide. In an interview, this was written about the band's travel arrangements:

But being enterprising young gentlemen, they are more than open to offers of vehicular transport from the public. "We will pay you! It needs to make it down to Sydney and then to Melbourne and then to Adelaide in one day. And then we have to play two shows in Adelaide and then we have to go back to Melbourne and then we need to get back to Brisbane", says Dom in a single breath.

"And it needs to preferably have air-conditioning", interjects Dan.

"God we're asking a lot aren't we!"

In October 2007, the Rocketsmiths released their second album, Meet Horace and Clyde, which was a huge success around Australia. They launched it at The Zoo, playing along with bands and singers, Yves Klein Blue, John Steel Singers and Inntown.

Before the release of Parts, Pieces, Triple J radio station released a "new music podcast", giving subscribers free songs of fairly new and hopeful bands. The Rocketsmiths' "The Boy Who Cried Misery", got featured as one of these podcasts and gained national, and international attention.

== EPs ==
=== Act One. Scene One. ===
Act One. Scene One. was the Rocketsmiths' first release, and released it when their name was still the John Citizens. It featured six songs, thus making it an EP. All six were recorded and mixed over two days, in June, 2006. Lead vocals and guitar, Dom Miller said, "It's a six-track EP that we recorded ourselves in rehearsal rooms, studios and bedrooms,". After releasing the EP, the Rocketsmiths performed many live shows in and around Brisbane, playing these songs. Act One. Scene One. was not widely released, as the Rocketsmiths were fairly new at the time, and it is now a rarity.

=== Meet Horace and Clyde ===
Released in July 2007, Meet Horace and Clyde was the Rocketsmiths' second critically acclaimed EP. This helped them gain popularity and publicity, and found them playing alongside "The Boat People", "We Are Scientists" and "The Presidents of the United States of America". They were also invited to play at the famous Brisbane music festival, The Valley Fiesta, in Brisbane. The name of the EP, refers to the Rocketsmiths' alter-egos, Horace and Clyde. These are based on people the Rocketsmiths had met "at late nights, in strange cities", and have "outrageous, ecstatic and dangerous personalities contained deep within the minds of The Rocketsmiths". The following refers to them:

In the dark of night, two strange men emerge from the depths of drunkenness to wreak havoc upon the world. These two men are wild, dangerous and extremely inappropriate. They do not discriminate against race, colour or creed; everyone is in their target. Whether you're a dopey bouncer throwing them out of a fine drinking establishment or a young lady just looking for a nice night out on the town, these two men will harass you until you're screaming for mercy or in fits of laughter. Who are these two strange men, you ask? For the answer look no further than Brisbane's very own, The Rocketsmiths. In July 2007 these two men, Horace and Clyde, will be unleashed upon the world in a storm of music, beer and vulgarities and you can come along for the ride. The Rocketsmiths present the release and subsequent tour supporting their new EP, Meet Horace and Clyde.

==== Track listing ====
Track	Song title	Length
1	"Modern Life"	3:18
2	"Worth It"	3:35
3	"A Good Example of a Cliche Love Song"	3:37
4	"Fake Vegas"	2:25
5	"Some Time of Mine"	3:25
6	"Augustine"	3:57

=== Parts, Pieces ===
Released on 11 October, Parts, Pieces, is the Rocketsmiths' newest and most successful EP so far. It follows the same format as the other EPs, having six songs. After Parts, Pieces was released, the Rocketsmiths' website biography changed to feature:

Picture yourself in an abandoned theme park. The rollercoaster is dilapidated, the merry go round a collection of twisted metal and cobwebs. The big top still stands, although shabby and dirty, in the middle of the park. Suddenly, the old tent lights up and strange music booms from the inside, cutting through the humid night air. A constant, throbbing beat grows faster as you run towards the thin streak of light shining from the entrance. The music seems to encompass everything around you; the decaying carnival, the deep night and the long grass brushing past your legs. There is no hint of danger as you burst through the tent flap and into the bright surrounds of the Big Top's interior. Standing on a stage in front of you are five young men with powerful voices and a sound like no other; they are Rocketsmiths.

==== Track listing ====
Track	Song title	Length
1	"Man with a Gun"	3:12
2	"The Boy Who Cried Misery"	3:33
3	"The River"	3:08
4	"Time Management Classes"	3:37
5	"Jeepers Creepers"	2:28
6	"The Tale of Two City Boys"	5:00

== Band members ==
- Dom Miller – vocals and guitar
- Ianboy Apuli – vocals and lead guitar
- Luke Hefferan – vocals and keyboards
- Dan Michael – vocals and bass
- Brenty Fitch – drums

=== Former ===
- Brock Smith – drums

== Discography ==
=== Studio albums ===
Year	EP
June 2006	Act One. Scene One.
October 2007	Meet Horace and Clyde
November 2008	Parts, Pieces
2010	The Bones
