= Neil Kulkarni =

British music journalist and author (1972–2024)

- Born: 26 July 1972; Coventry, England
- Died: 22 January 2024 (aged 51)
- Education: University of York
- Occupations: Music journalist, author, musician

Neil Kulkarni (26 July 1972 – 22 January 2024) was a British music journalist, author and musician from Coventry, England. Upon his death, Clash magazine called him "one of the sharpest pens of his generation". He primarily focused on hip-hop and metal.

== Early life ==
Kulkarni was born in Coventry to Marathi Brahmin parents who had immigrated from Maharashtra state, India, his father a chemist and his mother a midwife, and grew up with his sister Meera. Kulkarni graduated from the University of York.

== Career ==
Kulkarni was initially a writer for Melody Maker from 1993 to 2000, where he called out the publication's overlooking of Black artists. Following the discontinuation of the imprint Kulkarni wrote freelance for magazines and media including Uncut, Vox, Loaded, Spin, Metal Hammer, Plan B, The Source, The Guardian, Bizarre, The Quietus, DJ Magazine, and Drowned in Sound.

Kulkarni was the author of books including Hip Hop - Bring the Noise: The Stories Behind the Biggest Songs (2004) and The Periodic Table of HIP HOP (2015). The former is recommended by the Music Library Association as an academic resource covering c. 70 significant hip-hop recordings. He was a module leader on the Music Journalism course at BIMM Birmingham, and a musician with the band The Moonbears.

== Death ==
Kulkarni died on 22 January 2024, at the age of 51. At the time of his death, Kulkarni had a partner, four children (two of them are step-children) and four grandchildren.

== Bibliography ==
- Hip Hop - Bring the Noise: The Stories Behind the Biggest Songs (Thunder's Mouth Press, 2004)
- Eastern Spring: A 2nd Gen Memoir (Zero Books, 2012)
- The Periodic Table of HIP HOP (Penguin Books, 2015)
