= Dallas Frasca =

Australian musical group

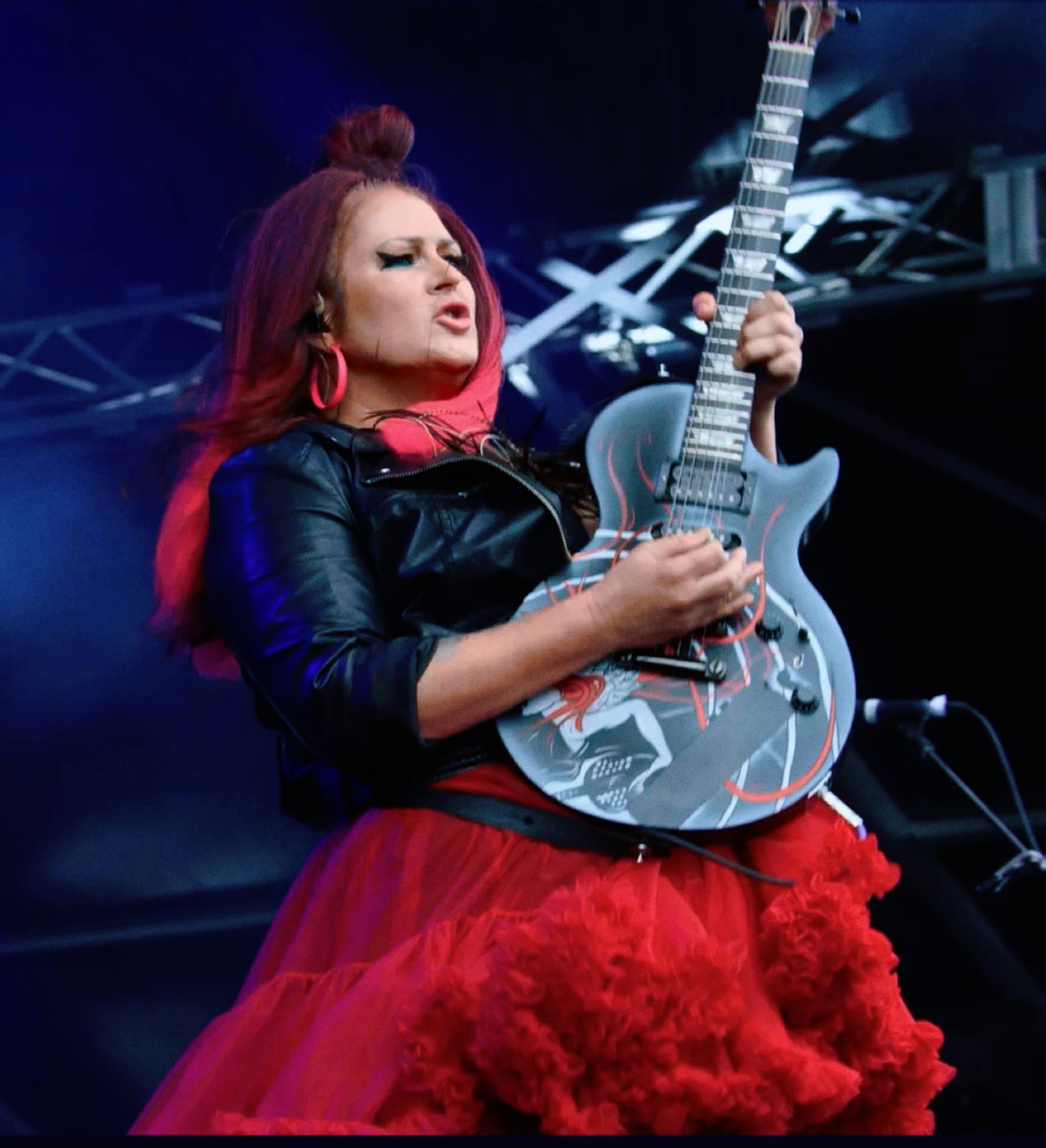

Background information
- Origin: Australia
- Genres: Rock, alternative, riff rock, soul
- Years active: 2006–present
- Label: Spank Betty Records
- Members: Dallas Frasca – vocals/guitar; Rotating Members
- Website: dallasfrasca.com

Dallas Frasca is an Australian rock singer, guitarist, and songwriter based in Melbourne.

Her 2024 album, Force of Nature, debuted at number 2 on the ARIA Blues Chart in its first week of release. During the album cycle, Frasca was a finalist for the 2025 Australian Women In Music Awards for Most Outstanding Songwriter/Composer alongside Missy Higgins and The Waifs. Her single "Stand On My Shoulders" was nominated at the APRA Music Awards of 2025 for Most Performed Blues & Roots Work and reached number 1 on the AMRAP Charts. Follow-up single "Let It Rain" was nominated for Most Performed Blues & Roots Work at the APRA Music Awards of 2026.

Frasca has supported major international acts including ZZ Top on their 2025 Australian and New Zealand arena tour, as well as Patti Smith on selected shows.

== History ==
=== Early life ===
Born in Adelaide, South Australia and raised in Wangaratta, Victoria, Dallas Frasca is an Australian roots rock singer and guitarist who performs both as a solo artist and as the frontwoman of the eponymous band Dallas Frasca. She is a descendant of Dame Nellie Melba, one of Australia's most celebrated operatic sopranos and prominent figures in Australian history.

Frasca began her singing career at the age of 18 after discovering her vocal ability at a friend's party.

=== Career ===
In 2006, Dallas Frasca gained national recognition after winning triple j’s "Light Your Fuse" competition with an E.P titled Acoustic Slide Grooves. Following this, she was booked to appear at that year’s Bluesfest, one of Australia’s major music festivals.

In 2008, Frasca was invited to perform with iconic Australian rock band Midnight Oil at a special event in Sydney supporting Amnesty International. That same year, she shared the stage with B.B. King in Cognac, France.

In early 2009, Frasca represented Australia as one of seven artists from seven continents performing at the International Earth Day celebrations in Montreal, Canada.

On 26 March 2010, Frasca was named Artist of the Year at the AIMAs. Following this achievement, she was invited to perform at the 2011 AIMAs awards held at the iconic Sydney Opera House.

In 2012, Frasca placed third in the AAA category of the International Songwriting Competition (ISC) for her track "All My Love", selected from over 16,000 global entries. The song was later re-recorded and released by Czech pop artist Lenny, reaching the top 10 on the charts in the Czech Republic.

In August 2012, Frasca joined Slash of Guns N' Roses to help launch Bob Irwin’s wildlife foundation, bringing together music and environmental advocacy.

In July 2013, Frasca supported Patti Smith during a performance on Corsica Island.

In April 2015, Frasca released her third studio album, Love Army, produced by New York-based producer Andy Baldwin. The album debuted at number 29 on the ARIA Charts, marking her first Top 50 entry.

In August 2015, Dallas Frasca toured Australia with Californian garage-soul band The BellRays, fronted by Lisa Kekaula (Basement Jaxx), performing six dates nationally. While in Melbourne, the two acts collaborated on a track recorded at Hothouse Studios in St Kilda, which was later released on The BellRays Covers EP in 2016. That same year, The BellRays invited Dallas Frasca on a co-headline European tour, performing 23 shows across 12 countries.

On 16 September 2016, Frasca released the Dirt Buzz EP and launched her own independent label, Spank Betty Records. In October and November that year, the band was invited to join American rock group Ugly Kid Joe on a 28-date European tour.

In 2018, Frasca was nominated for the Artistic Excellence Award at the 2018 Australian Women in Music Awards and performed in the first ever all female band to play at a sporting event in Australia at the closing ceremony of the Commonwealth Games on the Gold Coast, Queensland.

In 2025, Frasca received her first nomination for an APRA Award and was invited to be the opening act for ZZ Top on the Australian and New Zealand leg of their world Elevation Tour, which also featured George Thorogood as a special guest. During the tour, Thorogood invited Frasca to join him onstage multiple times.

=== Collaborations ===
Frasca has collaborated with a range of notable artists across her career. She contributed vocals to Californian rock band Ugly Kid Joe’s 2015 album, Uglier Than They Used to Be, which reached number 10 on the BBC UK Albums Chart.

She has recorded multiple tracks with Rob Hirst of Midnight Oil, including “Burnt Toast” from her album Not for Love or Money and a B-side track released with a single.

In 2015, Frasca appeared on a cover of The Clash’s “Safe European Home” with Suze DeMarchi of Baby Animals on DeMarchi’s solo album, Home — her first solo release in 20 years.

A career highlight for Frasca was performing “Boys in Town” by The Divinyls at the induction of Chrissy Amphlett into The Age and Music Victoria’s Hall of Fame in 2018. She performed alongside Ella Hooper of Killing Heidi, with notable audience members including Molly Meldrum, Little Pattie, and members of The Divinyls.

Frasca also collaborated with Jim Keays of Masters Apprentices on his final studio album, Age Against the Machine (2015), performing a duet on the track “Dig a Hole.”

In addition, she toured with Xavier Rudd across Australia, playing to over 35,000 people. During a show in Kuranda, Queensland, on 22 November, Frasca and Rudd recorded a live version of Mavis Staples’ “My Own Eyes.” Rudd also featured on Frasca’s song “Strong Man.”

== Band members ==
- Dallas Frasca (vocals and guitar)
- Rotating members

== Discography ==
=== Studio albums ===
Title	Details	Peak chart positions
Title	Details	AUS
Not for Love or Money	Released: August 2009; Label: Dallas Frasca, Third Verse (5021456168279); Formats: CD, DD	—
Sound Painter	Released: May 2012; Label: Dallas Frasca, Social Family Records (9324690072699); Formats: CD, DD	—
Love Army	Released: April 2015; Label: Spank Betty Records, Social Family Records (SFR0025); Formats: CD, DD, LP	29
Force of Nature	Released: 19 July 2024; Label: Spank Betty Records, (SPANK006B); Formats: CD, DD, LP	—

=== Extended plays ===
Title	Details
Learn Your Routes (as Dallas Frasca and Her Gentlemen)	Released: January 2007; Label: Dallas Frasca; Formats: DD
Dirt Buzz	Released: 16 September 2016; Label: Spank Betty Records, Formats: CD, DD, LP

== Awards and nominations ==
=== APRA Music Awards ===
The APRA Music Awards were established by Australasian Performing Right Association (APRA) in 1982 to honour the achievements of songwriters and music composers, and to recognise their song writing skills, sales and airplay performance, by its members annually.

Year	Nominee / work	Award	Result	Ref.
2025	"Stand On My Shoulders"	Most Performed Blues & Roots Work	Nominated	
2026	"Let It Rain"	Most Performed Blues & Roots Work	Nominated	

=== Australian Women in Music Awards ===
The Australian Women in Music Awards is an annual event that celebrates outstanding women in the Australian Music Industry who have made significant and lasting contributions in their chosen field. They commenced in 2018.

Year	Nominee / work	Award	Result
2018	Dallas Frasca	Artistic Excellence Award	Nominated
2025	Dallas Frasca	Outstanding Songwriter	Nominated
