= Jackie Marshall =

- Born: 29 June 1977 (age 49); Dubbo, New South Wales, Australia
- Education: Queensland Conservatorium of Music, BMus
- Occupations: Singer-songwriter; composer; actor; record producer
- Years active: 1996–present
- Children: 1
- Musical career
- Origin: Brisbane, Queensland, Australia
- Genres: Folk; pop; rock; alternative
- Instruments: Vocals; keyboards; acoustic guitar; piano
- Label: Sugarrush
- Website: jackiemarshall.com

Jackie Marshall (born 1977) is an Australian singer-songwriter, composer, record producer and actress. While her musical training is in jazz vocals (Queensland Conservatorium), her work is more commonly described as alt-country, folk, and rock.

== Career ==
Marshall's debut album Fight n'Flight was shortlisted for the Australian Music Prize. Through Triple J's Unearthed project, Missy Higgins selected Marshall as support for numerous dates on Higgins' 2007 On A Clear Night tour. Marshall featured in the 2007 Women in Voice lineup at the Queensland Performing Arts Centre and appeared on SBS Television's RocKwiz on 29 September 2007, singing her signature track "You Want What I've Got" as well as a duo with Colin Hay.

Marshall initially based her song-writing style on 1960s folk and rock influences, having eschewed grunge-era contemporary popular music for figures such as Bob Dylan and Joni Mitchell. Often playing in central Brisbane music venues such as Ric's Bar, and later now-defunct popular venues The Troubadour and The Alley, in 1999 she was invited to develop new work with Triple J Unearthed all-female "world music" act Tulipan after founding member Virag Antal left the group. This collaboration resulted in a recording, Horizon with producer Daniel Denholm, which was finally independently released by the group in 2022, the group having disbanded some 20 years earlier after being dropped from the Festival Records roster.

Geneticist Larry Croft invited Marshall to Slovenia in 2003 following Croft's involvement in Joey Skagg’s infamous BioPEEP media hoax. Marshall remained in Ljubljana for several months, making a number of artistic connections which in later years led to her return for collaborative projects.

After returning to Australia, she collaborated with alt-country singer-songwriter Chris Pickering (The Boat People) and became identified with the burgeoning Australian alt-country scene, recording her debut alt-folk album Fight n’Flight with Pickering, Savannah-Jo Lack (Trinkets) and other Brisbane musicians, produced by Ben Tolliday, at her family’s farm house located in Northern NSW. Following later touring with artists such as The Re-Mains and Sarah Carroll, Marshall was crowned The Peppercorn Queen at the 2009 Nymagee Arts & Music Festival by artist and poet Andrew Hull. In 2009 she was featured as guest vocalist on Slovenia-based Kosovan Gypsy composer and bassist Imer Traja Brizani’s International Day Of The Gypsy Stekleno Jabolka concert at Cankarjev Dom in Ljubljana on 8 April. later featuring on Brizani’s album For My People.[5] She recorded her second album, Ladies’ Luck, from 2008-2009, again produced by Tolliday, with Pickering as Musical Director, this time invoking a heavier alternative rock sound among subtler interludes, involving musicians Greg Cathcart (Silent Feature Era), Adrian Mauro (Machine Age) Luke Sullivan and Richard Johnston (Speedstar) and Heath Cullen, plus guest appearances from numerous artists including Lucie Thorne. The recording took place in band house studio The Ark located in Paddington, Brisbane, and was released in 2010. Prior to releasing the album, she spent five months in Japan on the paddle steamer The Michigan on Lake Biwa, playing her blend of experimental alt-country and folk classics.

In 2011 Jackie retreated to boat-access-only Scotland Island, located in Sydney’s Pittwater, in anticipation of the birth of her son August. Returning to Brisbane in 2013, she became a member of The Soldiers’ Wife from 2014 - 2018, touring Australia and working with the families of Australian servicemen and women to create songs to reflect their unique experiences of PTSD. As a result of her friendship with Leigh Ivin (The Re-Mains), Jackie recorded and released the EP Good People under the moniker The Peppercorn Queen et The Fat Lambs in 2014, subsequently recording a third full-length Jackie Marshall album Lilith Shrugs (2018) with Ivin.

Marshall has worked as a theatre composer, notably an adaptation of Tove Jansson’s The Summer Book by director Barbara Stupica for Lutkovno gledališče Ljubljana in 2017, and hybrid outdoor circus production Hysteria for Chelsea McGuffin & Co. in July 2021 in Brisbane. She has also worked as a record producer on Lydia Fairhall's debut album True North (2020).

Jackie starred in and composed music and lyrics for the independent feature film Three Chords and the Truth (2023, Film Quarter Pty Ltd), created by Wild Divine Film & TVs’ Claire Pasvolsky and Steve Pasvolsky.

== Personal life ==
Jackie is a survivor of multiple cancers, notably breast cancer over the period 2016-17 during which time she garnered widespread Australian music community support. She advocates for greater understanding and visibility for artists experiencing mental health and neurodiversity-related issues.

== Discography ==
Title	Details
Fight 'n' Flight	Released: September 2006; Label: Television Records Collective (TRC001); Format: CD, streaming, download
Ladies' Luck	Released: 4 January 2010; Label: Vitamin Records (TO3001); Format: CD, streaming, download
Lilith Shrugs	Released: 11 September 2018; Label: Sugarrush Records; Format: CD, streaming, download
You Are Not Too Much And You Are Enough	Released: 10 February 2024; Label: Bandcamp; Format: CD, streaming, download
