= Party Dozen =

Australian noise rock duo

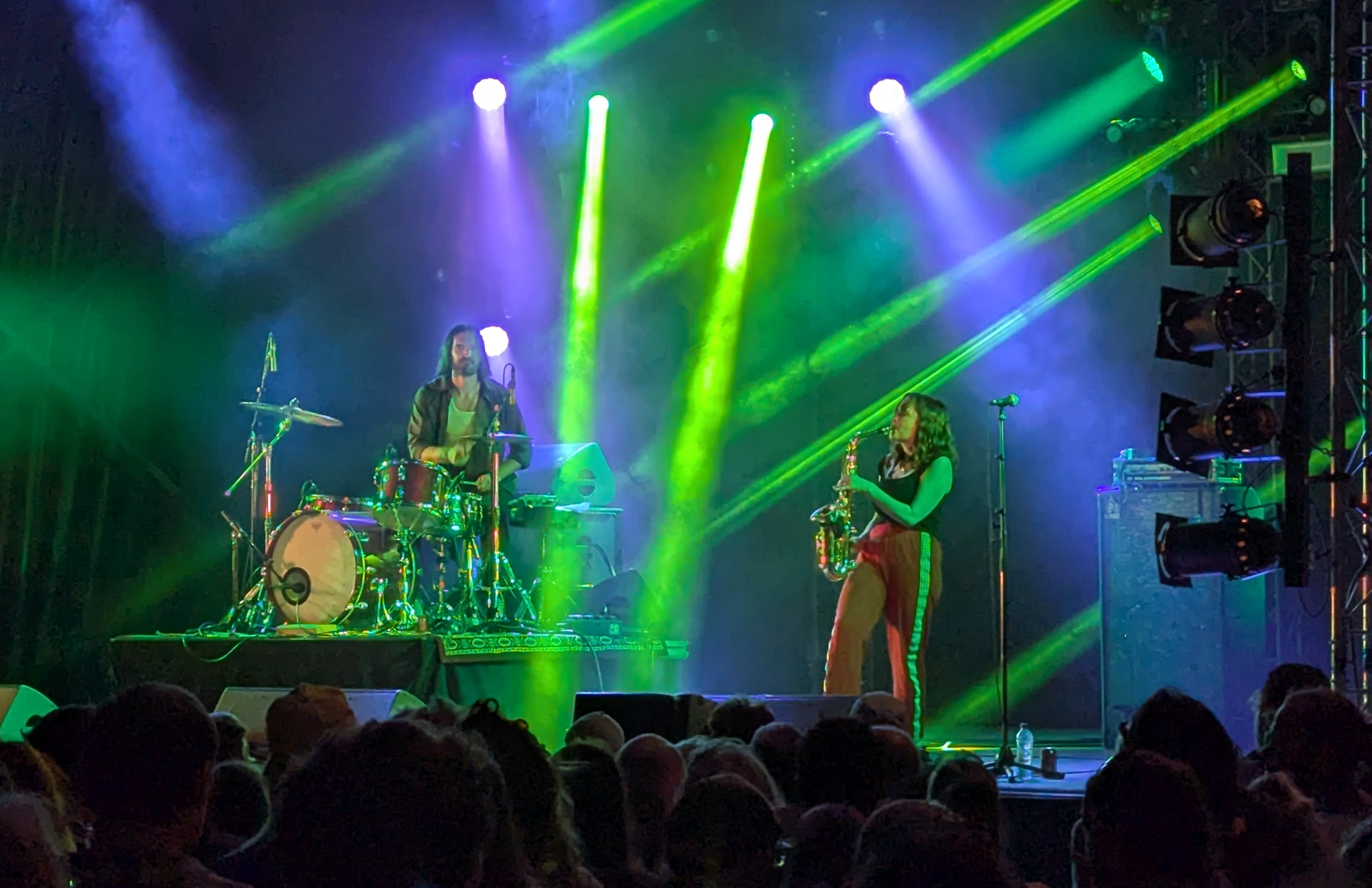
- Party Dozen in 2025

Background information
- Origin: Sydney, New South Wales, Australia
- Genres: Noise rock; experimental rock
- Years active: 2015–present
- Labels: Grupo; Temporary Residence Limited
- Spinoffs: Arse
- Spinoff of: Parades; Little Scout; Top People
- Members: Kirsty Tickle; Jonathan Boulet

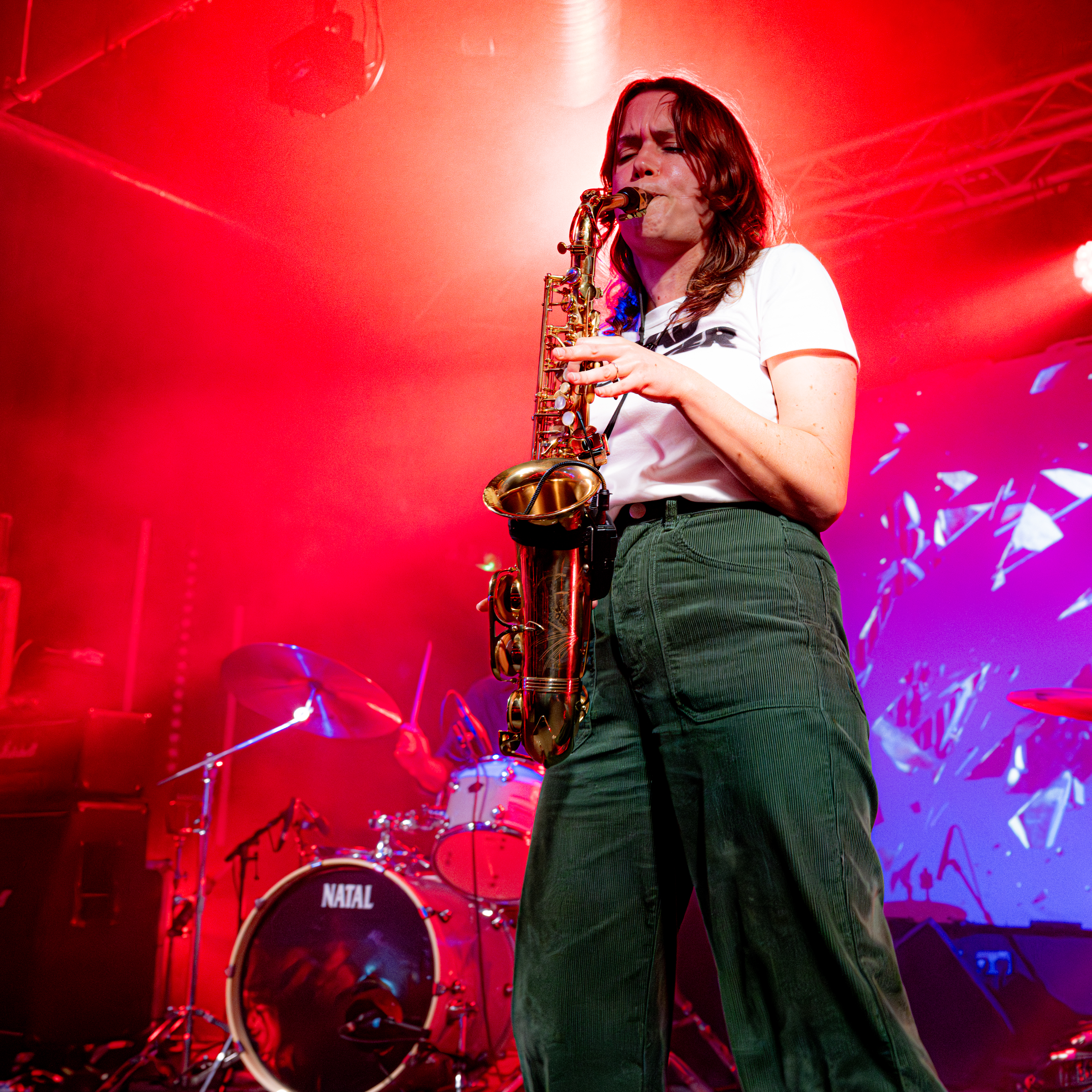
Mutations Festival, Brighton 2025

Party Dozen are an Australian rock band from Sydney, formed in the mid-2010s by saxophonist Kirsty Tickle and drummer Jonathan Boulet. To date, the band have released five studio albums: The Living Man (2017), Pray for Party Dozen (2020), The Real Work (2022), Crime in Australia (2024) and 21 Bum Salute (2026). The band has toured extensively, both nationally and internationally, including supporting the likes of King Gizzard and the Lizard Wizard, Amyl and the Sniffers, Spiritualized and Algiers.

== History ==
=== Formation and The Living Man (2015–2018) ===
Tickle and Boulet first met in 2009 when Boulet stopped in Brisbane while on tour with his band Parades and stayed with Tickle and her sister, who were then playing in indie pop group Little Scout. The two kept in touch and later spent time in London, where they began jamming and experimenting with ideas.

After working on individual projects, Boulet relocated to Berlin around 2013 in search of a heavier, more aggressive musical direction, while Tickle was also moving away from indie pop toward more experimental work. During a period when both were living in Berlin, the pair began developing a two-piece project built around saxophone, drums and electronics, working under the name Top People on "sludgy, doomy" material that would eventually evolve into Party Dozen.

By 2015–2016 the pair were back in Australia and began performing together in Sydney. The duo recorded their debut album, The Living Man, in a small Marrickville studio. It was released through their own label Grupo in 2017.

=== Pray for Party Dozen (2019–2021) ===
Party Dozen's second album, Pray for Party Dozen, was released on Grupo on 22 May 2020. Written and recorded in a small rehearsal room in Marrickville, the record further explored the duo's improvisational approach, building songs from loops and live takes with minimal overdubs. Tickle expanded her pedalboard and effects palette, while Boulet handled recording, mixing and mastering.

The album helped the band move beyond Sydney's DIY circuit and led to festival appearances in Australia.

=== The Real Work and Nick Cave collaboration (2022–2023) ===
The band's third album, The Real Work, was released in July 2022 through Grupo and the US label Temporary Residence Limited. The record broadened their sound with more varied loops, organ and piano samples and moments of relative restraint alongside their usual noise-rock intensity.

The Real Work attracted wider international attention in part due to the track "Macca the Mutt", which features a guest vocal from Nick Cave. According to the band, they sent Cave the nearly finished song via management, and he contributed an improvised coda vocal that they incorporated unchanged. Cave later described Party Dozen as "a force of nature". The album received positive reviews and appeared on year-end lists, including NME's list of the best Australian albums of 2022.

=== Crime in Australia (2024–present) ===
In 2024, Party Dozen released their fourth album, Crime in Australia, again recorded in their Marrickville studio and released via Grupo and Temporary Residence on 6 September 2024. The record was conceived as a kind of soundtrack to a fictional Australian crime film, drawing on the visual and thematic atmosphere of local crime movies and television such as Two Hands, Chopper, Wake in Fright, Mr Inbetween and other Australian noir works.

Around the album's release the band toured the UK and Europe and continued to appear at Australian festivals.

== Band members ==
- Kirsty Tickle – saxophone, vocals
- Jonathan Boulet – drums, sampler

== Discography ==
=== Studio albums ===
List of albums, with selected chart positions
Title	Album details	Peak chart positions
Title	Album details	AUS
The Living Man	Released: June 2017; Label: Grupo (GR001); Format: LP, digital	—
Pray for Party Dozen	Released: May 2020; Label: Grupo (GR007); Format: LP, digital	—
The Real Work	Released: July 2022; Label: Grupo (GR0011) / Temporary Residence (TRR403); Format: LP, digital	—
Crime in Australia	Released: September 2024; Label: Grupo (GR0014) / Temporary Residence (TRR432); Format: LP, CD, digital	89
21 Bum Salute	Released: November 2026; Label: Grupo (GR0016) / City Slang; Format: LP, digital	6

=== EPs ===
- Power Tripper (2018; split with Arse)

== Awards and nominations ==
=== Australian Music Prize ===
The Australian Music Prize (the AMP) is an annual award of $30,000 given to an Australian band or solo artist in recognition of the merit of an album released during the year of award. It exists to discover, reward and promote new Australian music of excellence.

Year	Nominee / work	Award	Result	Ref.
2022	The Real Work	Australian Music Prize	Nominated	

=== J Awards ===
The J Awards are an annual series of Australian music awards that were established by the Australian Broadcasting Corporation's youth-focused radio station Triple J. They commenced in 2005.

Year	Nominee / work	Award	Result	Ref.
2022	""Macca the Mutt"" by Party Dozen (featuring Nick Cave) (directed by Tanya Babic & Jason Sukadana)	Australian Video of the Year	Nominated	

=== National Live Music Awards ===
The National Live Music Awards (NLMAs) are a broad recognition of Australia's diverse live industry, celebrating the success of the Australian live scene. The awards commenced in 2016.

Year	Nominee / work	Award	Result	Ref.
2017	Kirsty Tickle (Exhibitionist, Party Dozen)	Live Instrumentalist of the Year	Nominated	
2018	Kirsty Tickle (Exhibitionist, Party Dozen)	Live Instrumentalist of the Year	Nominated	
2019	Jonathan Boulet (Party Dozen)	Live Drummer of the Year	Nominated	

=== NSW Music Prize ===
The NSW Music Prize aims to "celebrate, support and incentivise" the NSW's most talented artists, with "the aim of inspiring the next generations of stars". It commenced in 2025.

Year	Nominee / work	Award	Result	Ref.
2025	Crime in Australia	NSW Music Prize	Nominated	
