= Yesyesyesyesyes =

Studio album by The Boat People
- Released: 22 August 2005
- Genre: Indie pop
- Label: The Boat People, Shock
- Producer: Magoo, Jonathon Burnside, Ben Stewart

The Boat People chronology
Tell Someone Who Cares (2004)	Yesyesyesyesyes (2005)	Chandeliers (2007)

Professional ratings
Review scores
Source	Rating
The Courier-Mail	=
PopMatters	6/10
Rolling Stone	2.5/5 stars
Time Off Magazine	4.5/5 stars

Yesyesyesyesyes (stylised as yesyesyesyesyes) is the debut album from Brisbane band The Boat People, following four EPs over five years.

It features the singles "Clean" and "Unsettle my Heart" as well as "Tell Someone Who Cares", a song from their previous EP of the same name.

The group has three different singers on the record. For the most part, it's keyboardist Robin Waters who is the lead singer, but bassist James O'Brien contributes lead vocals to five tracks on the record, and guitarist Charles Dugan gives lead on the track "Central Station".

During the album's first week of release, it entered the Australian Independent Records chart at number 15 along with both local and nationwide play on alternative radio stations across Australia.

The album was distributed by Shock Records and mixed by Ben Stewart, Jonathan Burnside and Brisbane based producer Magoo.

== Track listing ==
1. "Clean"
2. "Unsettle my Heart"
3. "Irony"
4. "She's a Good Soul"
5. "Sink into the Sea"
6. "Tell Someone Who Cares"
7. "If We Hadn't Got Together..."
8. "Possum Magic"
9. "Central Station"
10. "Building Bridges, Digging Caves"
11. "The Picturesque"
12. "Me and the Sun"
