= Careless Talk Costs Lives (magazine) =

British music magazine

- Categories: Music
- First issue: January 2002
- Final issue: November 2003
- Country: United Kingdom

Careless Talk Costs Lives (usually known as Careless Talk or CTCL) was a British music magazine, published from January 2002 until November 2003.

== Beginnings ==
Careless Talk Costs Lives was formed by two veterans of the music press, journalist Everett True (real name Jerry Thackray) and photographer Steve Gullick. True had previously been a writer for the NME, assistant editor of Melody Maker and editor of Vox magazine. He was a key media cheerleader for Nirvana in the early 1990s, and introduced Kurt Cobain to his future wife Courtney Love. Also, as The Legend! he was the first artist to release a single on Creation Records. Gullick had been a successful photographer for NME and Melody Maker, and had also shot many record covers.

== The magazine ==
Disgusted by the state of mainstream music coverage, True and Gullick conceived a magazine to "bring down the UK music press" with particular venom reserved for the once iconoclastic, now insipid and marketing-driven NME.

The first issue was published in January 2002, with the Scottish band Mogwai on the front cover. It was fortunate that this coincided with a popular resurgence of guitar-based music, in the wake of the success of US bands such as The White Stripes and The Strokes. The focus was solidly on indie/alternative music, although there was an ongoing debate about the need for such classification. True tended to describe the content as reflecting "the music that we like". Relatively new acts such as Bright Eyes, Electrelane, Oneida, Scout Niblett, The Gossip and Yeah Yeah Yeahs were featured heavily, although there was also coverage of more established artists such as Nick Cave and Marc Almond. The magazine also gave exposure to Detroit acts that had risen in the slipstream of The White Stripes, such as The Von Bondies and The Dirtbombs. True's penchant for female-fronted bands also showed.

Some established writers from the British music press, such as Stevie Chick and Neil Kulkarni, contributed to CTCL, but the bulk of writers were from the fanzine and webzine scenes in the UK, North America, Australia and beyond. At Gullick’s insistence, the magazine used no photographs issued by PR people or record companies, ensuring that CTCL would stand out from any other publication on the shelf. As well as striking photographs by Gullick and others, the magazine made heavy use of illustrators. Despite limited budgets (CTCL was effectively run out of True's house in Brighton), the magazine was printed on heavy matt paper, and production quality was a priority.

Careless Talk Costs Lives also spawned an internet radio show and a number of live music events.

== The end ==
From the beginning, it had been decided that Careless Talk Costs Lives would run for 12 issues, and then close, unless it had succeeded in its Quixotic attempt to destroy the rest of the music press. The issues were even numbered backwards, from 12 to 1. The final issue was published on November 1, 2003. True wrote:

"Don't mourn for us. We set out what we intended to do. Exist for 12 issues, and stop. Prove that it's possible to put together a great magazine with few resources, aside from enthusiasm and talent and a passion for music. Cover the music we love in a manner we felt was befitting - words unhampered by thoughts of shifting units, photography that never once resorted to gimmickry, illustrations that burned with a desire to communicate. Our design was clear and bold, rooted in the belief that we were proud of our words and photography and illustrations, and that we had no desire to hide them behind 'sexy' layouts and lurid headlines. No press photos. No ringtone adverts. No full-stand displays in WH Smiths. No consideration for content beyond that we were listening to, and moved by at the time.

So we didn't bring down the UK music press.

We still fervently believe we're right."

True went on to publish Plan B magazine, and Gullick was behind Loose Lips Sink Ships.
