= Sime Nugent =

- Born: Simon Joe Nugent
- Origin: Melbourne, Victoria, Australia
- Genres: Pop; rock; blues; country
- Occupations: Musician; sculptor; visual artist; furniture maker
- Instruments: Vocals; guitars (acoustic, electric); mandolin; harmonica
- Years active: 1991–present
- Label: Low Transit Industries
- Formerly of: The Wilson Pickers

Simon Joe "Sime" Nugent is an Australian multi-instrumentalist-songwriter, sculptor and visual artist. He has worked in various groups including country music five-piece the Wilson Pickers (2008–2012, 2015–2018) and as a solo artist. Nugent is also a furniture maker.

== Biography ==
Simon Joe Nugent, spent his early years in Melbourne and then Castlemaine. His Irish-born parents and elder siblings had emigrated from Dublin in 1969. He attended schools in both Melbourne and Castlemaine before studying sculpture at Victorian College of the Arts (VCA). In the early 1990s he formed Sedan, which released two albums, Coaster (1997) and Elevator (1999). From 1994 he was also a member of an a cappella trio, the Acapelicans, with Sarah Liversidge and Carl Pannuzzo, which issued three albums Those Acapelicans (1994), Hear from Happiness (1998) and Little Mountains (2000).

In 1999 Simon Nugent and No Feathers were formed; they issued a self-titled album in that year. The group evolved into Sime Nugent and the Forefathers, which issued an album, More About the Benefit of Hindsight (2002) with Nugent on lead vocals, guitars and harmonica joined by Roger Bergodaz on drums, Steve Hesketh on piano, Wurlitzer and vocals and Amos Sheehan on bass guitar. Their next album, Undertow (2003), was declared feature album of the week by Australian music journalist, Ed Nimmervoll. Nimmervoll found that most of its tracks deal with Nugent's recent separation from a domestic partner and their child. While Tim Cashmere of Undercover felt it was "an eclectic form of acoustic folk that needs to be felt as well as heard."

The artist provided his next album, Broke & Banned – Songs of Sime Nugent, in 2005 via Low Transit Industries. D W May of theDwarf.com.au observed, "sparse instrumentation is clever and considered" where "space opens up around the sublime lyric, enabling the song to breathe and adding weight to his vocal." In 2008, on harmonica, guitar and backing vocals, Nugent formed a country music five-piece the Wilson Pickers alongside John Bedggood on fiddle, mandolin and backing vocals, Andrew Morris on acoustic guitar and vocals, Ben Salter on banjo and vocals and Danny Widdicombe on resonator guitar and vocals. His next solo album, Happy Hour, appeared in November 2007. His next solo album, Ten Years at the Table, was released in 2010.

In parallel with his solo work he formed a duo, Sweet Jean, with Alice Keath on acoustic guitar, autoharp, banjo, electric guitar, keyboards, piano and vocals in 2010. Their debut album, Dear Departure, appeared in 2013 and was followed by Greetings from Goodbye (2014) and Monday to Friday (2016).

Outside of his music career Nugent has worked as a sculptor, visual artist and furniture maker.
