= 2025 Australian Women in Music Awards =

Edition of annual Australian Women in Music Awards

- Date: 9 October 2025
- Venue: Fortitude Music Hall
- Website: womeninmusicawards.com.au

The 2025 AWMA is the sixth Australian Women in Music Awards. The finalists in 20 categories (one more than 2024) were announced on 29 July 2025 with the winners announced on 9 October 2025.

== AWMA Honour Roll ==
- Ruby Hunter

== AWMA Inspiration Award ==
- Donna Simpson and Vikki Thorn of the Waifs

== Nominees and winners ==
=== AWMA Awards ===
Winners indicated in boldface, with other nominees in plain.

Full list of nominees
Lifetime Achievement Award	Ethical Engagement Consultancy Humanitarian Award
**Dr. Shellie Morris (AO)**	**Tina Broad**; Catherine Mundy (OAM); Yantra de Vilder
Diversity in Music Award	Studio Production Award
**Grace Chia**; Christine García; Mindy Meng	**Tahlia-Rose Coleman**; Elise Reitze-Swensen; Louise Wheatley
Live Creative Production Award	Live Production Touring Award
**Kate Berry**; Karen Norris; Sarah Ponturo	**Letisha Ackland**; Bonnie Knight; Kat Rallis
Music Leadership Award	Songwriter Award
**Fiona Duncan**; Alexis Benedict; Maggie Collins	**Missy Higgins**; Dallas Frasca; Vikki Thorn & Donna Simpson of The Waifs
Music Photographer Award	Film-maker Award
**Suzanne Phoenix**; Adrianne Armida; Izzie Austin	**Emily Dynes**; Izzie Austin; Chrissy McHugh
Artistic Excellence Award	Creative Leadership Award
**Dr. Shellie Morris (AO)**; Kate Miller-Heidke; Missy Higgins	**Kimberley Galceran**; Luara Brandao; Sonja Horbelt
Excellence in Classical Music Award	Music Journalist Award
**Catherine Milliken**; Cheryl Barker (AO); Claire Edwardes (OAM)	**Jules LeFevre**; Megan Burslem; Jane Gazzo
Women in Heavy Music Award	Emerging Artist Award
**Monica Strut**; Leah Martin-Brown; Chrissy McHugh	**Katia Geha**; Beckah Amani; Maeve Grieve
Executive Leader Award	Opera Impact Award
**Nicole Richards**; Monique Douglas; Kimbali Harding	**Nicole Car**; Andrée Greenwell; Siobhan Stagg
Special Impact Award	
**Kylie Thompson**; Nancy Bates; Elise Reitze-Swensen	
