= The Wilson Pickers =

Australian musical group

- Origin: Melbourne, Victoria, Australia
- Members: Ben Salter; Danny Widdicombe; Andrew Morris; Sime Nugent; John Bedggood

The Wilson Pickers is a country blues band formed in 2008 and comprises three Queenslanders, Ben Salter, Danny Widdicombe, Andrew Morris, and two Victorians, Sime Nugent and John Bedggood.

Their 2008 album, Land of the Powerful Owl, earned them a nomination for an ARIA Award for Best Blues & Roots Album and their 2010 album, Shake It Down, earned them second.

== Band members ==
- John Bedggood – fiddle, mandolin, backing vocals
- Andrew Morris – acoustic guitar, vocals
- Sime Nugent – harmonica, guitar, backing vocals
- Ben Salter – banjo, vocals
- Danny Widdicombe – resonator guitar, vocals

== Discography ==
=== Studio albums ===
Title	Details
Land of the Powerful Owl	Released: 12 September 2008; Label: ABC Music (1780337); Format: CD, digital download
Jolene	Released: 28 August 2009; Label: ABC Music (2713374); Format: CD, digital download
Shake It Down	Released: 2 July 2010; Label: ABC Music (2740479); Format: CD, digital download
You Can't Catch Fish from a Train	Released: 26 August 2016; Label: ABC Music, UMA (4795857); Format: CD, digital download, LP, streaming

=== Live albums ===
Title	Details
Live!	Released: 26 January 2018; Label: ABC Music, UMA (670640); Format: CD, digital download, LP, streaming; Recorded at Byron Bay Blues and Roots Festival in 2017

== Awards and nominations ==
=== AIR Awards ===
The Australian Independent Record Awards (commonly known informally as AIR Awards) is an annual awards night to recognise, promote and celebrate the success of Australia's Independent Music sector. The commenced in 2006.

Year	Nominee / work	Award	Result
2017	You Can't Catch a Fish from a Train	Best Independent Blues and Roots Album	Nominated

=== ARIA Music Awards ===
The ARIA Music Awards is an annual awards ceremony that recognises excellence, innovation, and achievement across all genres of Australian music.

Year	Nominee / work	Award	Result
2009	Land of the Powerful Owl	Best Blues & Roots Album	Nominated
2010	Shake It Down	Best Blues & Roots Album	Nominated
2016	You Can't Catch a Fish from a Train	Best Blues & Roots Album	Nominated

=== Country Music Awards of Australia ===
The Country Music Awards of Australia is an annual awards night held in January during the Tamworth Country Music Festival. Celebrating recording excellence in the Australian country music industry. They commenced in 1973.

Year	Nominee / work	Award	Result	Ref.
2017	You Can't Catch a Fish from a Train	Alternative Country Album of the Year	Nominated	
