= Maggie Collins =

Maggie Collins is a Brisbane-based band manager and national radio announcer in Australia. Collins is manager of Brisbane bands John Steel Singers and DZ Deathrays.

She broadcasts weekly for youth station Triple J where she presents the weekend afternoons show. She was the former music director at Brisbane radio station 4ZZZ.

She plays in the avant-garde pop band The Thin Kids.

== Awards and nominations ==
=== Australian Women in Music Awards ===
The Australian Women in Music Awards is an annual event that celebrates outstanding women in the Australian Music Industry who have made significant and lasting contributions in their chosen field. They commenced in 2018.

Year	Nominee / work	Award	Result
2025	Maggie Collins	Music Leadership Award	Nominated
