= Siobhan Stagg =

Australian opera singer (born 1987)

Siobhan Stagg (born 16 September 1987) is an Australian operatic lyric-coloratura soprano.

== Biography ==
Stagg was born in Mildura to school teacher parents, and has two brothers. She completed her tertiary education at the University of Melbourne 2009 and Wales International Academy of Voice in Cardiff.

She was the winner of the 2012 First Prize and Audience Choice awards at The Mietta Song Competition.

She has appeared with the Salzburg Festival, the Berliner Staatsoper, the Bavarian State Opera, the Deutsche Oper Berlin, the Berlin Philharmonic, the Hamburg State Opera, the Royal Opera Covent Garden, Glyndebourne Festival Opera, Opernhaus Zürich, Opéra de Dijon, the Lyric Opera of Chicago and Victorian Opera. In 2020, she joined the board of directors with the Melba Opera Trust.

Stagg currently lives in Berlin with her partner Nelson.

== Discography ==
- Arrangements for Soprano and Brass Quintet (Viva Italia - Su le sponde del Tebro) (S. Stagg, Deutsches Symphonie-Orchester Berlin Brass Quintet) (2020) – Naxos, 845221054025.
- MOČNIK, D Johannes-Passion (Stagg, Teuscher, Glaser, Slovenian Philharmonic Choir, Munich Radio Orchestra, Repušić) (2023) - Naxos, 4035719003437
- Hahn, Debussy, Noga Quartet, Siobhan Stagg – Aquarelles (2019) - Avi Records,8553106
- Hymn à l'Amour, Siobhan Stagg / Amir Farid - Move Records, MD3360

== Videography ==
- Fidelio, Opéra Comique - Arte, Opéra Comique (2021)
- Handel's Messiah TV Special - ABC Classics Program, Blue Dog Productions (2019)
- MOZART, W.A. Zauberflöte (Die) [Opera] (Royal Opera House, 2017) (NTSC) - Naxos, 809478013433

== Awards and nominations ==
=== Australian Women in Music Awards ===
The Australian Women in Music Awards is an annual event that celebrates outstanding women in the Australian Music Industry who have made significant and lasting contributions in their chosen field. They commenced in 2018.

Year	Nominee / work	Award	Result
2025	Siobhan Stagg	Opera Impact Award	Nominated
