= Palladium (Australian band) =

- Origin: Brisbane, Queensland, Australia
- Genres: Indie rock
- Years active: 1997–2003
- Labels: Warner Music Australasia
- Past members: Chris Chalk; Andrew Morris; Justin Sykes; Brant Ward
- Website: Website

Palladium was an Australian band from Brisbane that was active from 1997 to 2003. The band consisted of members Chris Chalk (drums), Andrew Morris (guitar and vocals), Justin Sykes (bass) and Brant Ward (guitar and vocals).

Palladium released their debut single "Hoarsey" in March 2001. Their debut album, Sister Flute and the Sunday Best, was released later in the year.

In 2003 they released "Everybody Loves New Fashion" which reached No. 92 on the ARIA Singles chart.

The band received significant national airplay on Triple J with songs such as "Hoarsey" and "Good Girls".

They played their last show in October 2003 after Ward had decided to part ways. Morris, Sykes and Chalk were already working together on a new project. The band were recording a new album at the time. In 2009 the material that the band was working on at the time of their break-up had remained unreleased.

== Discography ==
=== Albums ===
Title	Details	Peak chart positions
Title	Details	AUS
Sister Flute and the Sunday Best	Released: September 2001; Label: Warner Music Australasia (0927400352)	153

=== Singles ===
List of singles, with selected chart positions
Title	Year	Chart positions	Album
Title	Year	AUS	Album
"Hoarsey"	2001	116	Sister Flute and the Sunday Best
"Good Girl"	2001	—	Sister Flute and the Sunday Best
"A Little Crazy"	2002	—	Sister Flute and the Sunday Best
"Everybody Loves New Fashion"	2003	92	
