= Fat Mans Cleavage =

Australian punk band

- Origin: Brisbane, Queensland, Australia
- Genres: Punk rock
- Years active: 2000–2008
- Label: Independent
- Members: Sebastian Loria; Ray Morgan 'Hollywood Bonecrusher'
- Website: Fat Mans Cleavage Myspace page

Fat Mans Cleavage was an Australian punk rock band from Brisbane, Queensland. They are best known for winning Triple J's Unearthed competition in October 2006.

== History ==
Their music is characterised by its speed and often vulgar lyrics. They have received moderate airplay on Australia's national radio station Triple J, and have toured nationally. They have also performed at QPAC (Queensland Performing Arts Centre), which is notable as QPAC is a prestigious venue usually reserved for operas and concertos. They formed in 2000 and have since undergone an inordinate number of line-up changes. The band currently comprises "Bast-oh!" (Sebastian Loria) who is the lead vocalist and bass player, "Razor" (Ray Morgan) on guitar and backing vocals, and "Hollywood Bonecrusher" (real name unknown) on drums.

Fat Mans Cleavage have independently released two EPs; Unleash the Dingo (2005) and Out of Ideas (2006).

In November 2005, Fat Mans Cleavage was invited to play at the 6th Annual Ramone-a-thon, one of Brisbane's most prestigious alternative-culture events. They performed alongside bands such as The Queers, Mach Pelican, and the Self Righteous Bros.

This year has seen Fat Mans Cleavage embark on four interstate tours, playing dates in: Roma, Townsville, Mackay, Airlie Beach, Sydney, Newcastle, Wollongong, Melbourne, Tarwin and Venus Bay.

In October 2006, Fat Mans Cleavage won the Triple J Unearthed Taste of Chaos Competition (QLD). As a prize, the band performed at the Taste of Chaos show in Brisbane at the Brisbane Entertainment Centre.

The band broke up at the end of 2007 due to several simultaneous factors amongst the 3 remaining members (the band played its last and most active few years with 3 members after various incarnations with, at times, up to 682 members on stage).

== Contributing factors ==
In 2007 Sebastian Loria moved to the Gold Coast, starting a bachelor's degree in Popular Music and creating a death metal/grind/hardcore side project called "BobSaget!". Hollywood Bonecrusher went to rehab. Ray Morgan disappeared, abandoning all electronic forms of communication.

== Last show ==
The band played its last show at the Brisbane Entertainment Center during the 2006 "Taste of Chaos" tour. Attendance was roughly 15,000 with the band playing between Anti-Flag and the last band of the evening, Taking Back Sunday. Immediately after the show Justin Sane, singer of Anti-Flag, approached the band for a possible signing with his record label. The band declined.

== Members ==
- Sebastian Loria (a.k.a. "Basto") - vocals, bass

== Previous members ==
- Daniel Morgan (guitar)
- Ray Morgan (a.k.a. "Razor") - guitar, backing vocals
- "Hollywood Bonecrusher" (replacing Mulli "The Mule") - drums
- Matt "Pop punk is fun" Penkethman (drums)
- Stu Petri (bass)
- Mick "Ghosthunter" (Last name unknown) Drums
- Luke the Vegan Viking (drums)

== Discography ==
=== EP's ===
- Unleash The Dingo (EP) (2005)
- Out of Ideas (2006)
