= Tulipan =

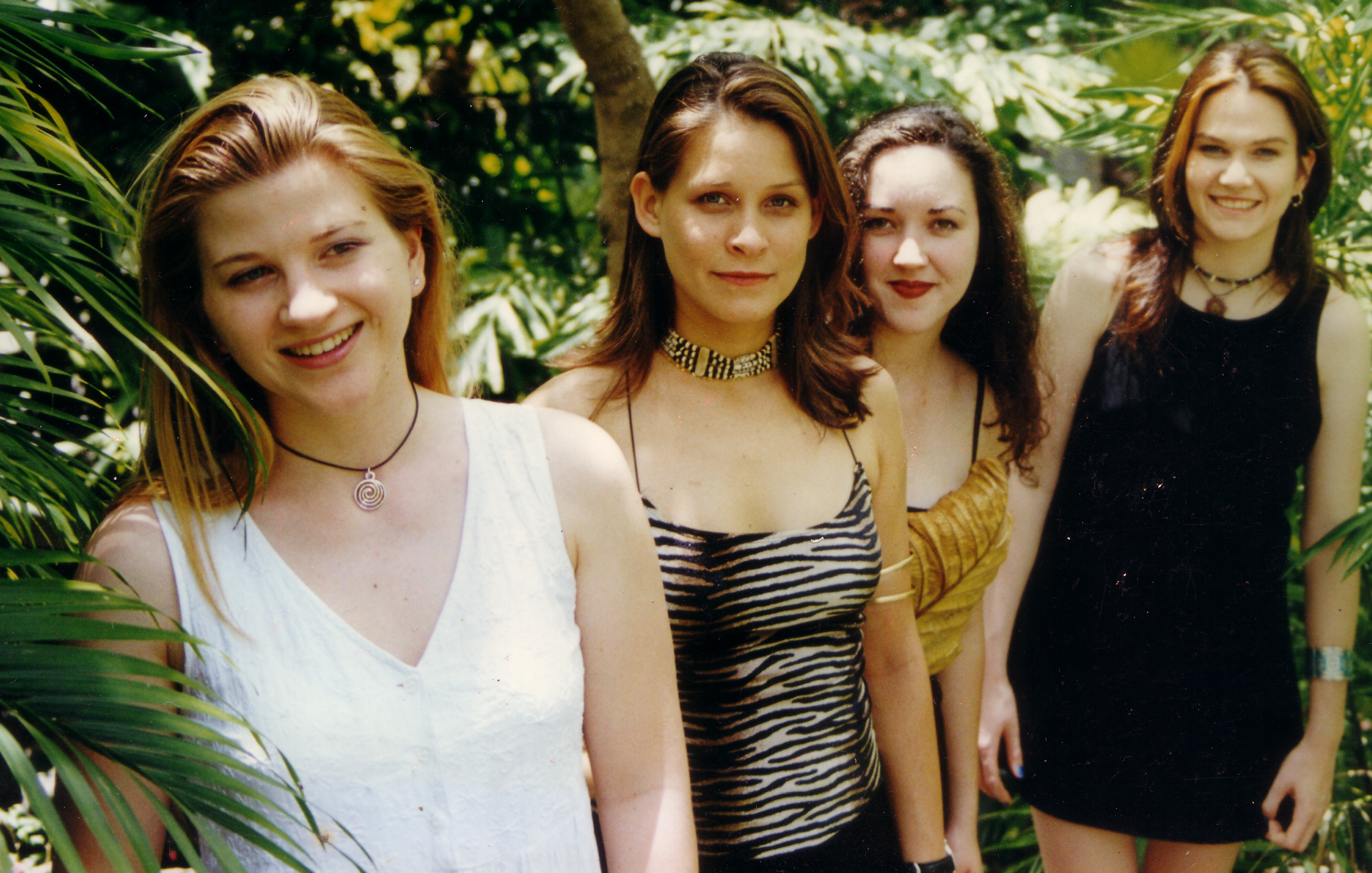

Background information
- Origin: Brisbane, Australia
- Genres: Hungarian folk/fusion
- Years active: 1993–2000
- Labels: Festival Records
- Website: Tulipan on Spotify

Tulipan was a Brisbane-based Hungarian fusion band who were active from 1993 to 2000.

Virag Antal, founder of the group, learned to play the traditional folk instruments hurdy-gurdy, zither and cimbalom or hammered dulcimer while at school in Hungary. She started the group in 1993 at the Queensland Conservatorium of Music among fellow students as a project. Before long the group started receiving requests to play at venues such as the indie-music nightclub The Zoo in Brisbane.

The band toured the east coast of Australia and performed at Australian music festivals including Livid, Big Day Out and WOMADelaide. They were regular special guests at Woodford Folk Festival.

Tulipan played traditional Hungarian melodies fused with other musical influences such as world music, jazz and pop, on folk instruments. Paul Petran, Music Deli presenter for ABC Radio National, said that Tulipan "sound like no other band in Australia at the moment".

Virag Antal left Tulipan in 1999.

== Members ==
The lineup included the following musicians:

- Virag Antal, lead vocals, hurdy-gurdy, zither, hammered dulcimer (1993-1999)
- Sallie Campbell, violin, keyboard, vocals
- Jasmine Geraghty, saxophone, keyboard, vocals
- Tanja Hafenstein, percussion, drums, vocals
- Jackie Marshall, lead vocals, guitar, keyboard (2000)
- Louise Finnegan, percussion, vocals (1994–1995)
- Francis Gilfedder, wind instruments and percussion (1994)

== Discography ==
=== Albums ===
Title	Details	Peak positions
Title	Details	AUS
Manic Celeste	Released: 1997; Label: Tulipan (TUL002); Formats: CD	—

=== Extended plays ===
Title	Details	Peak positions
Title	Details	AUS
Tulipan	Released: 1997; Label: Tulipan; Formats: CD	—

== Awards and nominations ==
=== ARIA Music Awards ===
The ARIA Music Awards is an annual awards ceremony that recognises excellence, innovation, and achievement across all genres of Australian music. They commenced in 1987.

Year	Nominee / work	Award	Result	Ref.
1998	Manic Celeste	Best World Music Album	Nominated	
