= Danny Widdicombe =

Australian musician

- Born: Daniel Marseden Widdicombe
- Origin: Queensland, Australia
- Genres: Country, blues, soul, jazz
- Instruments: Guitar, Vocals
- Years active: 1997–present
- Member of: The Wilson Pickers

Daniel Marsden "Danny" Widdicombe is a musician from Queensland.

== Career ==
In 2008 Danny Widdicombe, on resonator guitar and vocals, formed a country blues band the Wilson Pickers alongside John Bedggood on fiddle, mandolin and backing vocals, Andrew Morris on acoustic guitar and vocals, Sime Nugent on harmonica, guitar and backing vocals and Ben Salter on banjo and vocals. He also performs in a duo with Morris and has a solo career.

At 19 years old, Widdicombe was diagnosed with leukaemia. In 2011 he released a solo album, Find Someone, which he completed while his leukaemia returned.

In 2019, Widdicombe teamed up with instrumental jazz trio Trichotomy for album Between the Lines. Trichotomy's Sean Foran is on keyboards, John Parker on drums and Samuel Vincent on double bass, while Widdicombe plays guitar, pedal steel and sings.

== Discography ==
=== Studio albums ===
Title	Details
The Transplant Tapes	Release date: 2006; Label: Butter Chicken Records (BC001); Formats: CD, DD
Dominoes	Release date: 2009; Label: ABC Music (2715011); Formats: CD, DD
Find Someone	Release date: November 2011; Label: ABC Music (2783074); Formats: CD, DD
Between the Lines (with Trichotomy)	Release date: August 2019; Label: Futurfonic Records; Formats: CD, DD, streaming

== Awards ==
=== Queensland Music Awards ===
The Queensland Music Awards (previously known as Q Song Awards) are annual awards celebrating Queensland, Australia's brightest emerging artists and established legends. They commenced in 2006.

Year	Nominee / work	Award	Result (wins only)
2007	himself	QMusic Encouragement Award	awarded
2021	"Falling" (with Kristin Berardi and Trichotomy)	Jazz Award	Won
