= Little Scout =

Australian musical group

- Origin: Brisbane, Australia
- Genres: Indie rock, Ambient Pop, Pop, Indie
- Years active: 2008–present
- Label: Independent MGM Distribution
- Members: Melissa Tickle; Patrick Elliott; Miro Mackie
- Past members: Laura Kovic, Kirsty Tickle

Little Scout are an independent band from Brisbane, Australia. They have released two EPs and one album, and have toured with established Australian bands Yves Klein Blue, The Holidays, Holly Throsby, Clare Bowditch and Cloud Control; and international bands Belle and Sebastian, The New Pornographers, Sharon Van Etten, School of Seven Bells and Camera Obscura. Soon after forming in 2008 they were named as one of Triple J's "Next Crop" artists and have been featured on Vimeo, receiving over 69,000 views. Their debut album Take Your Light was released in 2011, to positive reviews.

Little Scout play an integral part within the Brisbane independent music community and wider Australian music community, with members previously performing live and on record for other established bands including but not limited to The John Steel Singers, Hungry Kids of Hungary, Parades, Edward Guglielmino and Skinny Jean. In 2011 they were selected to play the Big Sound conference - a key industry event in Australia.

Little Scout released single "Go Quietly" in June 2012, co-written with Scott Bromiley (The John Steel Singers) and engineered by drummer Miro Mackie. The song was mixed by American producer Lars Stalfors (The Mars Volta) who contacted the band after hearing them on Triple J unearthed radio. Carter Maness of New York blog RCRD LBL wrote "Marching along with loose floor toms, swelling guitar and sweet female harmonies, Aussie rockers Little Scout really succeed at the oft-attempted 'bringing garage rock to the beach' concept. "Go Quietly" is pure summer fun – a bit dreamy, a bit whimsical, a bit soaked."

== Discography ==
| Title | Year |
|---|---|
| Dead Loss EP | 2008 |
| Different in the Distance | 2009 |
| Take Your Light | 2011 |
| Go Quietly (Single) | 2012 |
| Are You Life | 2013 |

== Band members ==
- Melissa Tickle – Vocals, guitar
- Patrick Elliott – Vocals, guitar, bass
- Miro Mackie – Drums, recording

=== Touring members ===
- Nick Smethurst – Guitar

=== past members ===
- Kirsty Tickle – Keyboards, sampler, vocals
