= Andrew Morris (musician) =

Australian musician

- Occupation: Musician

Andrew Morris is a musician from Brisbane, Queensland. He is a former member of Palladium and is part of The Wilson Pickers, performs in a duo with Danny Widdicombe and has a solo career. In 2008 he won (with Widdicombe) the Grant McLennan Memorial Scholarship.

== Biography ==
In 2008 Andrew Morris on acoustic guitar and vocals formed a country blues band the Wilson Pickers alongside John Bedggood on fiddle, mandolin and backing vocals, Sime Nugent on harmonica, guitar and backing vocals, Ben Salter on banjo and vocals and Danny Widdicombe on resonator guitar and vocals.

== Discography ==
=== Studio albums ===
| Title | Details |
|---|---|
| Little By Little | Release date: November 2004; Label: Soul Arch Records (SAR001); Formats: CD, DD |
| Valleys | Release date: December 2006; Label: Rubber Records (RUB225); Formats: CD, DD |
| Union Bars | Release date: August 2007; Label: ABC Music (5144224982); Formats: CD, DD |
| Needs and Wants | Release date: 2009; Label: ABC Roots (17943759); Formats: CD, DD |
| Shadow of a Shadow | Release date: 2010; Label: ABC Roots (274 9621); Formats: CD, DD |
| The Situationist | Release date: October 2012; Label: Soul Arch Records (SAR003); Formats: CD, DD |
| Give/Take (Twelve Explorations for Saxophone and Piano) (with Theo Jobst) | Release date: January 2014; Label: Formats: CD, DD |

== Awards ==
=== Q Song Awards ===
The Queensland Music Awards (previously known as Q Song Awards) are annual awards celebrating Queensland, Australia's brightest emerging artists and established legends. They commenced in 2006.

| Year | Nominee / work | Award | Result (wins only) |
|---|---|---|---|
| 2007 | "See the Smoke" | World / Folk Song of the Year | Won |
