= Giants of Science =

Australian band

- Origin: Brisbane, Queensland, Australia
- Genres: Geek rock
- Years active: 1999–present
- Labels: Rhythm Ace, Plus One Records
- Members: Ben Salter; Ben Tuite; Steve Lynagh; Matt "Tanzie" Tanner
- Website: https://www.plusonerecords.com.au/project/giants-of-science/

Giants of Science is an Australian geek rock band formed in Brisbane, Queensland in 1999. They refer to their music as "nerd-core" and have been influenced by Split Enz Swervedriver, Sparklehorse, Superchunk, Brisbane underground rockers the KT26ers, and Sonic's Rendezvous Band. They have supported MC5, Rollins Band, A Perfect Circle, and Mudhoney and have toured in Canada. Their album Here Is The Punishment debuted at #4 on the national AIR independent albums chart.

== Discography ==
=== Albums ===
- Here Is The Punishment (Reverberation/+1 Records)
- The History of Warfare (Rhythm Ace)
- Live At The Troubador (+1 Records)

=== Singles and EPs ===
- I've Tried CD Single
- Blueprint For Courageous Action EP
- Sisters EP
- What’s Wrong With You And Why? EP
