= Drawn from Bees =

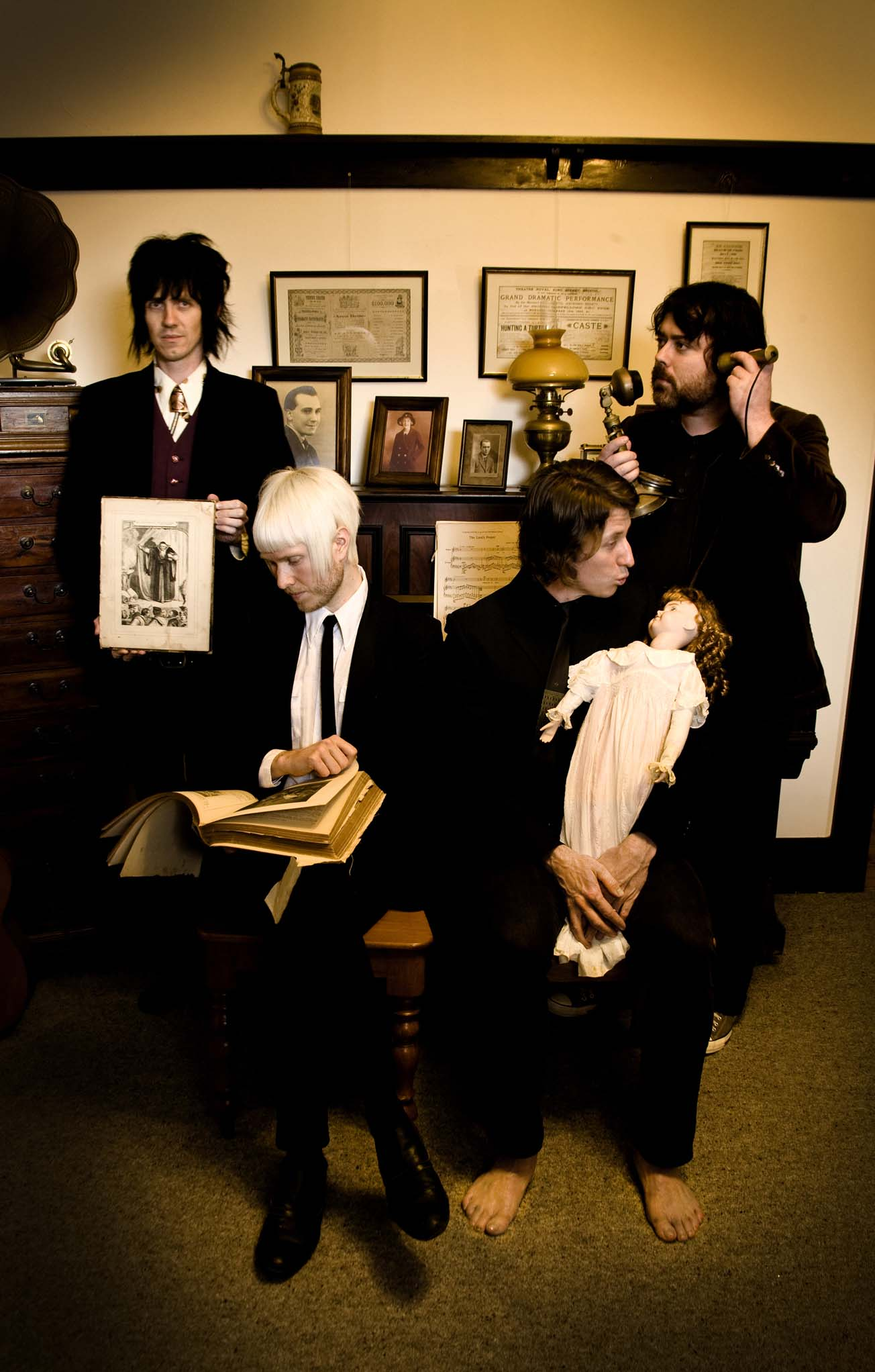

Background information
- Origin: Brisbane, Australia
- Genres: Art rock Progressive rock
- Years active: 2008–present
- Label: Bonefinger Records
- Members: Dan James Stew Riddle Matt Wedmaier
- Past members: Raven Jones
- Website: www.drawnfrombees.com

Drawn from Bees are an art rock band from Brisbane, Australia. The band is composed of Dan James (lead vocals, guitar), Stew Riddle (bass guitar, vocals), and Matt Wedmaier (drums, vocals). Drawn from Bees are signed to local Brisbane-based record label, Bonefinger Records, distributed via Believe Music, and published by Ink Music/Universal.

== History ==
After a ten-year stint as progressive rock band Glasshouse, Drawn from Bees debuted in 2008. Drawn from Bees launched their first EP, The Boy and the Ocean, a few months later.

In March 2009, the band released their second record, a mini-album entitled And the Blind Shall Lead the Way, which has garnered widespread praise from the music press. The band has also been featured on Richard Kingsmill's flagship Triple J radio show, 2009, as well as having single 'Long Tooth Setting Sun' added to rotation. The band also won a Triple J Unearthed competition to play the Valley Fiesta.

In October 2009, Drawn from Bees released their third record, The Sky is Falling, an EP containing a series of vignettes revolving around a central theme of the sky falling down, touring throughout Queensland, New South Wales, Victoria and South Australia. The band spent the remainder of 2009 in the studio, preparing their debut full-length record.

In April 2010, the band were invited to showcase at Musexpo Los Angeles, followed by showcases at Music Matters, Hong Kong and Musexpo Europe. The band undertook a month-long tour of the United States in 2011, including performances at South by Southwest (Austin, Texas), Canadian Music Week (Toronto) and the Bowery Ballroom (New York City). In 2012, Drawn from Bees released The May King and His Paper Crown to critical acclaim.

Gravity, the new Drawn from Bees single, is a return to form for the perennial Brisbane art-rockers. From the swelling synths to the driving bass, the song propels the listener across space and time in a retro-futuristic space odyssey. Accompanying the single release is a music video that takes the space adventure theme, drawing on inspiration from 1980s space adventure cartoons, such as Ulysses 31, to create a cosmic adventure complete with lost love and space monsters. Gravity is the fourth release in a space-inspired series, following All These People, Kindness, and Coldest Night.

== Style ==
The art rock sound that is purveyed by Drawn from Bees combines elements of contemporary art and literature with rock music, a movement that can be traced back to the 70's and 80's pioneers, including Pink Floyd, Roxy Music, Brian Eno and David Bowie. Modern art rock contemporaries include Arcade Fire, and Radiohead.

== Discography ==
- The Boy and the Ocean EP (2008 - Bonefinger Records/Believe Digital)
- And the Blind Shall Lead the Way mini-LP (2009 - Bonefinger Records/Believe Digital)
- The Sky is Falling EP (2009 - Bonefinger Records/Believe Digital)
- Fear Not the Footsteps of the Departed LP (2010 - Bonefinger Records/Believe Digital)
- Cautionary Tales for the Lionhearted EP (2011 - Bonefinger Records/Believe Digital)
- The May King And His Paper Crown LP (2012 - Bonefinger Records/Believe Digital)
- Web of Thieves EP (2014 - Bonefinger Records/Believe Digital)
- "All these People" Single (2016 - Bonefinger Records/Believe Digital)
- "Kindness" Single (2017 - Bonefinger Records/Believe Digital)
- "Coldest Night" Single (2017 - Bonefinger Records/Believe Digital)
- "Gravity" Single (2017 - Bonefinger Records/Believe Digital)
