= Everett True =

British journalist (born 1961)

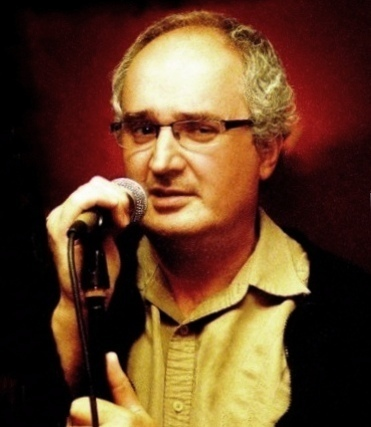
- Everett True in 2007

Background information
- Also known as: Jerry Thackray; The Legend
- Born: Jeremy Andrew Thackray; 21 April 1961 (age 65); Chelmsford, Essex, England
- Genre: Rock
- Occupations: Music journalist; musician
- Years active: 1982–present
- Label: Thick Syrup

Everett True (born Jeremy Andrew Thackray on 21 April 1961) is an English music journalist and musician. He became interested in rock music after hearing The Residents, and formed a band with school friends. He has written and recorded as The Legend.

== Career ==
In 1982, he went to a gig by The Laughing Apple and met the group's lead singer Alan McGee. According to McGee: "there used to be this guy who'd stand at the front of all the gigs and dance disjointedly". They became friends and when McGee started the Communication Blur club, he offered Thackray the role of compėre, stating that Thackray "was the most un-enigmatic, boring, kindest, shyest person you could ever meet – and it just appealed to my sense of humour to make him compère." He was originally billed as "the legendary Jerry Thackray", eventually shortened to simply "The Legend".

McGee also offered him a column in his new fanzine, also called Communication Blur, but Thackray left after two issues, because he objected to McGee's proposal to put a flexidisc of The Smiths on the front cover. He instead started his own zine, The Legend!, under which name he recorded the single "73 in 83", the first to be released by McGee's Creation Records. In 1984, he released a second single, "Legend Destroys the Blues", but his performing career did not take off. He puts this down to that he "didn't like to perform a song more than once", although he has continued to make occasional appearances.

In 1983, Thackray began working at the New Musical Express. In 1988, he was dismissed from the paper, and instead took a job at its rival, Melody Maker. He was told to adopt a new pseudonym, as the "Legend!" name was too closely associated with the NME. He chose "Everett True", from the early twentieth century cartoon The Outbursts of Everett True.

Within months, he was sent to Seattle to cover the emerging grunge scene. In 1989, as The Legend!, he performed guest vocals on a single with Calvin Johnson and Tobi Vail's band The Go Team. In 1991, he introduced Kurt Cobain to Courtney Love at a Butthole Surfers and L7 gig. The three became close friends, and, in 1992, True wheeled Cobain on stage at the Reading Festival. In 2006, True published Nirvana: The True Story, a book about his personal relationship with the band and the grunge scene.

In the early 1990s, True lived in Brighton, East Sussex, with members of the band Huggy Bear.

Leaving Melody Maker in the late 1990s, he became editor of Vox, reverting on this occasion to his real name. It has been claimed that the band theaudience were formed after founder member Billy Reeves bet True £100 that he could form a band and get it signed.

In 1998, True returned to Seattle, where he worked for a year as music editor for The Stranger, before heading for Australia, where he freelanced at Melbourne broadsheet, The Age. He also recorded an album under the name The Legend!. Back again in the United Kingdom, he set up the magazine Careless Talk Costs Lives in 2002. Issues of this publication began at No. 12 and counted down, claiming that "we have set out to replace the decaying music press in Britain, so by issue zero we will either have achieved our objectives or given up trying". By the twelfth issue (#1), it was clear that it would not achieve its ambitions, and True instead founded Plan B.

Between 2004 and 2009, True has also written books, including ones on the Ramones, The White Stripes, as well as an account of his time with Nirvana. In 2008, he relocated with his family to Brisbane in Australia. Up until the start of 2009, he wrote a weekly column for VillageVoice.com, and The Guardian – with the latter, entering into conflict with Australia's music street press. There was also a fair amount of controversy over some unguarded remarks True made on Twitter with regard to the usage of Kurt Cobain's image in Guitar Hero 5. These led to immediate furious denials from Dave Grohl and Krist Novoselic. Later, Courtney Love denied that she had anything to do with the matter, but it was then revealed that Love had worked with Activision on crafting Cobain's look for the game. The family subsequently returned to the United Kingdom.

True currently contributes columns to Sweden's Go Magazine, New York City's Bust magazine, the Something Awful website and writes for various Australian online publications including Mess And Noise and The Vine. True also fronts two Brisbane bands: The Deadnotes and The Thin Kids, the latter of which caused some controversy when they picked up a plum support to Kate Nash midway through 2010. For several years, he was the main editor and writer for the Brisbane-based online magazine, Collapse Board.

His most recent project is Rejected Unknown, a media/publishing company set up in response to the 33 1/3 series of music books; it takes its name from the album by Daniel Johnston. The first book came out in 2016, and is entitled 101 Albums You Should Die Before You Hear, a critique of the sacred cows of the rock music canon. This was followed in 2017 by his biography The Electrical Storm: Grunge, my Part In Its Downfall, and in 2018 by the short story collection Ed Sheeran Is Shit.

As Jerry Thackray, he is Course Leader in BA (Hons) Music Journalism at BIMM London. He still performs on stage as The Legend!.

== Discography ==
=== The Legend ===
==== Albums ====
- Some of Us Still Burn (mini-LP) (1985), Vinyl Drip
- Everett True Connection (2001), 3 Acre Floor

==== Singles and EPs ====
- "'73 in '83" (1983), Creation
- "Destroys the Blues" (1984), Creation
- "Talk Open (live)" (1984), Legend! (free flexi-disc given away with Legend! fanzine)
- Everything's Coming Up Roses EP (1986), Vinyl Drip
- "The Ballad" (1987), Constrictor
- "Step Aside" (1988), Constrictor
- "Breakfast in Bed" (1990), K Records (as guest vocalist with the Go Team)
- "Do Nuts" (1991), Sub Pop
- The Legend! Sings the Songs of Daniel Treacy (2005), Unpopular
- The Thin Kids w/ Kate Nash - The Thin Kids theme b/w Kate Nash ft. Everett True - Warrior in Woolworths (2012), Have 10p Records
- The Thin Kids ft. Kate Nash - Free Pussy Riot Now! (2013), Have 10p Records
