= Plan B (magazine) =

British music magazine

- Editor: Louis Pattison
- Categories: Independent music, Film, Books, Visual art
- Frequency: Monthly
- Publisher: Frances Morgan
- First issue: June 2004
- Final issue: May 2009
- Company: Plan B Publishing Limited
- Country: United Kingdom
- Language: English
- Website: planbmag.com

Plan B was a monthly music magazine based in London, England. It catered mainly towards independent music but did not discriminate between the relative popularity of the bands it features. Plan B also documented alternative culture such as film, comics, video games, visual art and books. It was founded by editor-in-chief Everett True (a.k.a. Jerry Thackray), art director Andrew Clare and publisher Chris Houghton, although later editor and publisher Frances Morgan was also a major influence.

In May 2009, it was announced that Plan B's forty-sixth issue would be its last.

== Background ==
Plan B was started after the demise of the magazine Careless Talk Costs Lives, which shared a similar ethos and many of the same contributors.

== Ethos ==
The concept originally laid down by Thackray was to exist under the radar of the mainstream music press such as the New Musical Express or Q, both of which are seen as the antithesis of Plan B. Although Thackray used to work in the mainstream media throughout the nineties under the pseudonym Everett True along with his CTCL compatriot Steve Gullick, he became disheartened by the lack of individuality and increased focus on commercialism. Thus, Plan B (along with Gullick's Loose Lips Sink Ships) was created to champion causes apparently forgotten in the mainstream press. Plan B tried to mirror the artistic nature of its content by including full page photography and colourful illustrations. This is largely due to the work of art director Andrew Clare. It is also printed in full colour on thick, satin paper, which creates a musky scent.

The emphasis of Plan B was on nurturing young talent and subsequently, many of the writers are unknown within their field. Several regular contributors do freelance work for the mainstream music press but their work in Plan B was usually more varied because the magazine did not impose a 'house style' on its writers. This often led to a more anecdotal, emotional response to art - a style which is discouraged in the mainstream press. This was reflected in the magazine's reviews, which did not contain the 'grading' or 'marking' system so commonly found elsewhere.

In keeping with this ethos, Plan B commonly covered artists with little mainstream appeal. The contributors as a whole did not distinguish between artists within the mainstream and those in the left-field but the bias is arguably towards the latter. Thackray is also renowned for being a champion of equality within music, whether sexual, gender-based or racial. Indeed, detractors have in the past labelled his supposed bias towards female-helmed bands to be over-zealous. Of course, this could also be seen as a genuine attempt by Thackray to redress the balance in a male dominated music press.

In September 2006, Plan B changed its frequency from bi-monthly to monthly.

In a post-mortem piece of the magazine as part of Drowned in Sound's Music Journalism R.I.P? Week, former staff writer kicking_k said of Plan B's demise: "Had we been selling more issues, there would have been a buffer, we may have been able to ride out the drought. I think it's important could-be readers realise that – if there's a magazine out there you still plan on reading month after month, brace yourself and buy it – every edition of Plan B, surveys say, was read by four people. If each of those had bought their own, it'd still be here."

== Content ==
Plan B was divided into the following sections -

- The Void - previews of new bands and miscellaneous short articles and columns.
- Features - longer interviews with bands and musicians.
- Live - reviews of live music.
- Albums - reviews of recorded music.
- Media - articles on books, films, video games, visual art and comics.

== Covers ==
The following bands have been on the cover of Plan B magazine:

Chicks On Speed, Joanna Newsom, Magnetic Fields, Smoosh, Afrirampo, Arcade Fire, Black Dice, Sonic Youth, The Research, Cat Power, Yeah Yeah Yeahs, The Long Blondes, Silver Jews, The Gossip, CSS, Boris, Sunn O))), Deerhoof, Herman Dune, Electrelane, Grinderman, Battles, Wiley, Björk, M.I.A., Animal Collective, Scout Niblett, Prinzhorn Dance School, Billy Childish, Dirty Projectors, Earth, The Breeders, Glass Candy, Chromatics, No Age, Sparks, Los Campesinos!, Roots Manuva, Rolo Tomassi, Gang Gang Dance, Grace Jones, Micachu, Bat For Lashes, Dan Deacon, PJ Harvey & John Parish, Grizzly Bear and Speech Debelle

== Credits ==
Plan B was credited to the following people -

=== Editorial ===
- Louis Pattison - Editor
- Andrew Clare - Art Director
- Cat Stevens (not the singer) - Photography Editor
- kicking k - The Void (new bands and smaller features) + Lives
- Lauren Strain - Albums

=== Publishing ===
- Frances Morgan - Publisher
- Everett True - Publisher-At-Large
- Nick Taylor - Advertising Manager
- Richard Stacey - Assistant Publisher

Plan B Magazine was published by Plan B Publishing Limited. Distribution through Warners Group Distribution (Newsagents, Borders and International), Worldwide Magazine Distribution (HMV/Virgin) and Cargo Records (Record Stores).
