= The Gin Club =

Australian folk rock band

- Origin: Brisbane, Queensland, Australia
- Genre: Folk rock
- Years active: 2004–present
- Label: Plus One Records
- Members: Ben Salter; Adrian Stoyles; Scott Regan; Brad Pickersgill; Conor Macdonald; Bridget Lewis; Ola Karlsson; Dan Mansfield; Angus Agars
- Past members: Ben Tuite; Dale Peachy; Jacob Harris; Matt Schneider

The Gin Club is an Australian folk rock band formed in Brisbane, Queensland in 2004. The band formed when the various members met while frequenting an open mic night at Brisbane pub O'Malley's. The Gin Club have won three Q Song awards and have toured in Canada and the United States.

== Discography ==
=== Albums ===
Title	Details
The Gin Club	Released: June 2004; Label: Plus One Records (P1-01); Format: CD
Fear of the Sea	Released: November 2005; Label: Plus One Records (P1-08); Format: CD
Junk	Released: February 2008; Label: Plus One Records (P1-15); Format: CD, Digital download
Deathwish	Released: February 2010; Label: Plus One Records (P1-28); Format: CD, Digital download
Live	Released: June 2012; Label: Plus One Records (P1-41); Format: CD, Digital download; Note: Live album
Southern Lights	Released: February 2015; Label: Plus One Records (P1-60); Format: CD, Digital download, LP

=== Extended plays ===
Title	Details
Gabriel	Released: September 2005; Label: Plus One Records (P1-05); Format: CD

== Awards ==
=== Queensland Music Awards ===
The Queensland Music Awards (previously known as Q Song Awards) are annual awards celebrating Queensland, Australia's brightest emerging artists and established legends. They commenced in 2006.

Year	Nominee / work	Award	Result (wins only)
2006	"Honey Don't"	Blues and Roots Song of the Year	Won
2008	"Ten Paces Away" (written by Ben Salter)	Song of the Year	Won
2008	"Ten Paces Away" (written by Ben Salter)	Rock Song of the Year	Won
