= The John Steel Singers =

Australian band

- Origin: Brisbane, Queensland, Australia
- Years active: 2007–2016
- Labels: Levity, Dew Process
- Past members: Scott Bromiley; Tim Morrissey; Ross Chandler; Pete Bernoth; Luke McDonald; Jonathan Boulet; Kirsty Tickle; Dion J. Forde; Damien Hammond; Pat McDermott; Conan Thorogood

The John Steel Singers were an Australian six-piece band from Brisbane, Queensland, named after a toy horse that band member Tim Morrissey named John Steel. They were formed in 2007 when Morrissey and Scott Bromiley decided to start making music together and were soon joined by Ross Chandler, Pete Bernoth, Pat McDermott and Luke McDonald (formerly of Sunk Loto) . The band released an EP and a mini album independently before signing with Levi's Jeans' record label Levity and releasing another EP, In Colour. The band has had multiple tracks on rotation on Triple J, won a Triple J Unearthed competition and became the Unearthed Artist of the Year in 2008. The band's song 'Overpass' placed 52nd in the 2010 Hottest 100.

== Discography ==
=== Studio albums ===
List of studio albums, with selected chart positions
Title	Year	Peak chart positions
Title	Year	AUS
Tangalooma	2010	67
Everything's a Thread	2013	—
Midnight at the Plutonium	2016	—

=== EPs ===
- The John Steel Singers (2007)
- The Beagle and the Dove mini LP (2008)
- In Colour (Levity, 2008)
- Masochist (2009)

== Band members ==
Final lineup

- Scott Bromiley – vocals, guitar, keyboards, trumpet, bass
- Tim Morrissey – vocals, guitar, keyboards
- Ross Chandler – drums
- Pete Bernoth – vocals, keyboards, trombone
- Luke McDonald – vocals, keyboards, guitar
- Jonathan Boulet – percussion
- Kirsty Tickle – saxophone, vocals

Former members

- Dion J. Forde – bass
- Damien Hammond – bass
- Pat McDermott – bass
- Conan Thorogood – bass

== Awards ==
=== AIR Awards ===
The Australian Independent Record Awards (commonly known informally as AIR Awards) is an annual awards night to recognise, promote and celebrate the success of Australia's Independent Music sector.

Year	Nominee / work	Award	Result
2009	The John Steel Singers	Breakthrough Independent Artist	Nominated

=== J Award ===
The J Awards are an annual series of Australian music awards that were established by the Australian Broadcasting Corporation's youth-focused radio station Triple J. They commenced in 2005.

Year	Nominee / work	Award	Result
2008	The John Steel Singers	Unearthed Artist of the Year	Won
