= The Boat People (band) =

Australian indie pop band

- Origin: Brisbane, Australia
- Genres: Indie pop
- Years active: 2000–present
- Labels: Shock Records
- Members: James O'Brien; Robin Waters; Charles Dugan; Tony Garrett
- Past members: Chris Pickering
- Website: Official website

The Boat People were an Australian four-piece indie pop band. The Brisbane based group consists of James O'Brien, Robin Waters, Charles Dugan and Tony Garrett.

== History ==
The Boat People began performing in the Brisbane music scene in early 2000, releasing their debut self-titled E.P. in October of that year.

In 2002, the band's released their second E.P. titled Squeaky Clean E.P.. Another E.P. was released in 2003, titled Three Pieces for Small Ensemble found radio success and the band toured before the departure of drummer Chris Pickering. Pickering was briefly replaced by Geoff Green, of successful Brisbane group George, before Tony Garrett joined the group. The band then released their fourth E.P. titled Tell Someone Who Cares in 2004.

In August 2005, The Boat People released their first studio album, titled, yesyesyesyesyes, which included the singles "Clean" and "Unsettle My Heart". After extensive touring at home, the group made their first trip overseas, performing at the Musexpo conference in Los Angeles.

The band returned to the studio in 2007 and in late April 2008, the band released "Awkward Orchid Orchard", the first single from their forthcoming album Chandeliers. Its accompanied video was created by Paul Underwood who has worked on previous videos from the band. In the video, the viewer is encouraged to find 52 bands amongst the visual hints given. Their second full-length album Chandeliers was released in July 2008.

The band released "Echo Stick Guitars" as the lead single from their third studio album, Dear Darkly, released in 2010.

== Members ==
- James O'Brien (vocals/bass)
- Robin Waters (vocals/keyboard)
- Charles Dugan (vocals/guitar)
- Tony Garrett (drums)

== Discography ==
=== Albums ===
Title	Details
yesyesyesyesyes	Released: 22 August 2005; Label: The Boat People / Shock (TBP006); Format: CD, digital download
Chandeliers	Released: December 2008; Label: The Boat People / Shock (TBP007); Format: CD, digital download
Dear Darkly	Released: July 2010; Label: The Boat People / MGM (TBP010); Format: CD, digital download

=== EPs ===
Title	Details
The Boat People	Released: 2000; Label: Frumpy Records (TBP001); Format: CD
Squeaky Clean EP	Released: 2002; Label: Frumpy Records (TBP002); Format: CD, digital download
Three Pieces for a Small Ensemble	Released: 2003; Label: The Boat People (TBP003); Format: CD, digital download
Tell Someone Who Cares	Released: 2004; Label: The Boat People (TBP004); Format: CD, digital download

== Awards ==
=== Queensland Music Awards ===
The Queensland Music Awards (previously known as Q Song Awards) are annual awards celebrating Queensland, Australia's brightest emerging artists and established legends. They commenced in 2006.

Year	Nominee / work	Award	Result (wins only)
2006	"Unsettle My Heart"	Song of the Year	Won
2006	"Unsettle My Heart"	The Courier-Mail People's Choice Award	Won
