= Konstantin Kersting =

German–Australian musical artist

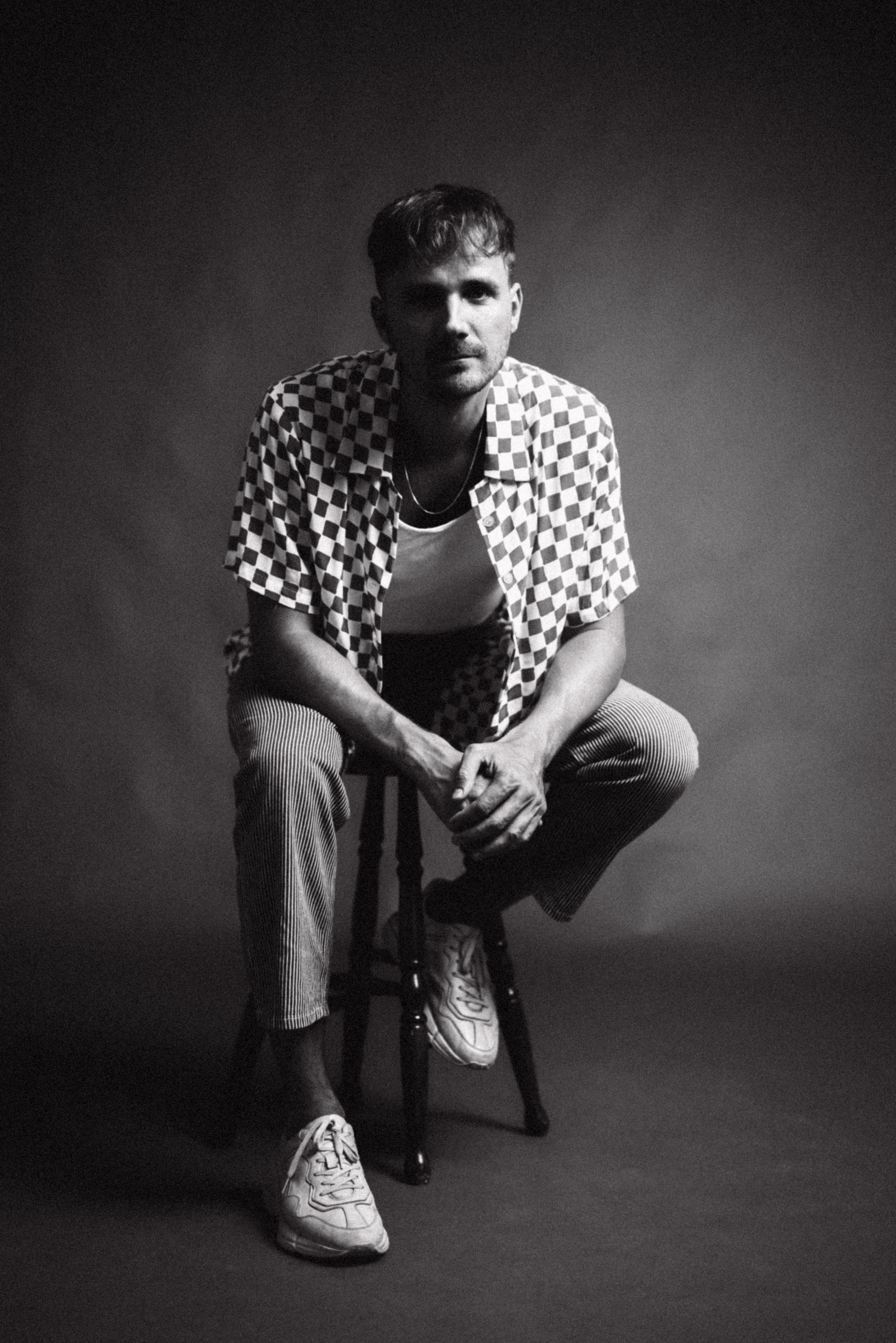

Background information
- Born: Konstantin Frederik Kersting; Germany
- Occupations: Record producer; songwriter
- Years active: 2012–present
- Website: konstantinkersting.com

Konstantin Frederik Kersting is a German-Australian music producer, songwriter and sound engineer. He has worked with a diverse range of artists, including Tones and I, Milky Chance, Mallrat, Fisher, Spacey Jane, Amy Shark, The Jungle Giants, The Rubens, R3HAB, The Church, Genesis Owusu, Budjerah, Kita Alexander and Peach PRC.

== Career ==
Kersting received his musical education in Berlin, where he learned to play the violin, bass guitar, and double bass. During this time, he also gained experience performing in both a jazz band and an orchestra. Kersting relocated to Australia as a teenager.

Kersting is a founding member of indie band The Belligerents.

In 2015, Kersting produced the debut extended play Holy Sick by Australian rock band Waax and Snap EP by The Vernons.

In 2017, Kersting co-wrote and produced Mallrat's "Better" which won Best Unpublished Work in the Vanda & Young Songwriting Competition in 2018. In May 2018, Kersting was signed to Independent publisher Native Tongue.

In 2019, Kersting re-worked a number of Sunnyboys' tracks for their compilation album, 40.

In September 2019, Kersting received two nominations at the ARIA Music Awards of 2019 for Tones and I's "Dance Monkey".

In 2021, Kersting co-produced and mixed 7 songs on The Rubens album "0202", which debuted at #1 on the ARIA charts. In the same year he also mixed and engineered on the #1 ARIA charting album ‘Love Signs’ by Australian band The Jungle Giants. That year he went on to win the ARIA award for Producer of the Year and Engineer of the Year.

In 2022, Konstantin produced 8 songs on the #1 ARIA charting album ‘Here Comes Everybody’ by Australian band Spacey Jane.

In 2023, Kersting co-produced and mixed DMA's album, How Many Dreams, which went on to reach #2 on the ARIA Charts and received three 2023 ARIA Music Award Nominations, winning Best Group. He also produced Peach PRC's debut EP, Manic Dream Pixie, which debuted at #1 on the ARIA Charts. In addition Konstantin also co-wrote and was the vocal producer on Fisher's single 'Atmosphere', which went onto become platinum certified in Australia & gold certified in New Zealand.

In 2024, Kersting co-wrote, produced and mixed Kita Alexander's debut album Young in Love. He also produced The Ruben's album Soda, which charted at #4 on the ARIA charts.

== Discography ==
Year	Artist	Song title	Album	Credit	Certifications
2015	WAAX		Holy Sick EP	Producer, Engineer	
2017	The Kite String Tangle		The Kite String Tangle	Engineer	
2017	The Jungle Giants		Quiet Ferocity	Producer (Additional Production), Engineer, Mixer	ARIA: Gold
2017	The Jungle Giants	"Feel the Way I Do"	Quiet Ferocity	Producer (Additional Production), Engineer, Mixer	ARIA: 2 x Platinum
2017	The Jungle Giants	"On Your Way Down"	Quiet Ferocity	Producer (Additional Production), Engineer, Mixer	ARIA: Gold
2017	The Jungle Giants	"Bad Dream"	Quiet Ferocity	Producer (Additional Production), Engineer, Mixer	ARIA: Platinum
2017	The Jungle Giants	"Used to Be in Love"	Quiet Ferocity	Producer (Additional Production), Engineer, Mixer	ARIA: 2 x Platinum
2017	The Church		Man Woman Life Death Infinity	Engineer	
2017	Mallrat	"Better"	In The Sky EP	Songwriter, Producer, Engineer	ARIA: Platinum
2018	Tia Gostelow	"Strangers"		Producer, Engineer, Mixer	ARIA: Platinum
2018	Tia Gostelow		Thick Skin	Songwriter, Producer, Engineer	ARIA: Gold
2018	The Kite String Tangle		The Kite String Tangle Presents: In A Desperate Moment	Engineer	
2018	Mallrat	"Groceries"	In The Sky EP	Songwriter, Producer, Engineer	ARIA: 3× Platinum
2019	Tones and I	"Johnny Run Away"	The Kids Are Coming	Producer, Engineer, Mixer	ARIA: 3× Platinum
2019	Tones and I	"Dance Monkey"	The Kids Are Coming	Producer, Engineer, Mixer	ARIA: 19× Platinum; BEA: 4× Platinum; BPI: 4× Platinum; BVMI: 7× Gold; IFPI SWI: 3× Platinum; MC: Diamond; RIAA: 4× Platinum; RMNZ: 5× Platinum; SNEP: Diamond
2019	Tones and I	"Never Seen the Rain"	The Kids Are Coming	Producer, Engineer, Mixer	ARIA: 6× Platinum; BEA: Platinum; MC: Gold; RMNZ: Gold; SNEP: Gold; BPI: Sliver
2019	Tones and I		The Kids Are Coming	Producer, Engineer, Mixer	ARIA: Platinum; MC: Gold; SNEP: Gold; RIAA: Gold
2019	The Jungle Giants	"Heavy Hearted"		Engineer, Mixer	ARIA: Platinum
2019	The Rubens	"Live in Life"		Producer, Mixer	ARIA: 3× Platinum
2019	Sunnyboys		40	Engineer, Mixer	
2020	Tones and I	"Bad Child"		Producer, Engineer, Mixer	ARIA: 3× Platinum
2020	Milky Chance Featuring Jack Johnson	"Don't Let Me Down"		Producer (additional Production)	
2020	The Jungle Giants	"Sending Me Ur Loving"	Love Signs	Co-Mixer	ARIA: Gold
2020	Washington	"Dark Parts"	Batflowers	Engineer, Additional Production and Vocal Production	
2020	Eves Karydas	"Complicated"		Mix Engineer	ARIA: Gold
2020	Eves Karydas	"Get Me So High"		Mix Engineer	
2020	Dami Im	"Paper Dragon"		Producer, Mix Engineer	
2020	Yoste		A Few Brief Moments	Songwriter, Producer, Engineer	
2020	The Rubens	"Masterpiece"		Producer (Co-Producer), Mixer	ARIA: Gold
2021	The Rubens		0202	Producer (Co-Producer, Additional Production), Mixer	
2021	The Jungle Giants	"Treat You Right"		Mixer	
2021	Genesis Owusu	"Easy"	Smiling with No Teeth	Mixer	
2021	Peach PRC	"Heavy"		Producer	
2021	The Jungle Giants		Love Signs	Engineer, Mixer	
2021	Tones and I	"Dark Waters"	Welcome to the Madhouse	Producer, Mixer	MC: Gold
2022	Spacey Jane		Here Comes Everybody	Producer	ARIA: Gold
2022	Budjerah	"What Should I Do?"	Conversations	Writer, Co-Producer	
2022	Kita Alexander	"Run"		Mixer	
2022	Sycco	"Superstar"		Co-Producer	
2022	The Belligerents	"Another Way of Living - EP"		Additional Production, Mixer	
2022	Harvey Sutherland		Boy	Mixer	
2022	R3HAB x Amy Shark	"Sway My Way"		Producer, Engineer	ARIA: Platinum
2022	Mallrat	"Obsessed"	Butterfly Blue	Co-Writer, Producer	
2022	Amy Shark	"Only Wanna Be With You"		Co-Producer	
2022	DMA's	"Everybody’s Saying Thursday’s The Weekend"		Co-Producer, Mixer	
2023	Spacey Jane ft Benee	"Lots of Nothing"		Producer	
2023	DMA's		How Many Dreams	Co-Producer, Mixer	
2023	Peach PRC		Manic Dream Pixie EP	Producer	
2023	Fisher	"Atmosphere"		Co-Writer, Vocal Production	ARIA: Platinum RMNZ: Gold
2023	Tash Sultana		Sugar EP	Mixer	
2024	The Rubens	"Good Mood"		Producer	
2024	Kita Alexander		Young in Love	Co-Writer, Mixer, Producer	
2024	Spacey Jane	"One Bad Day"		Co-Writer, Producer	
2024	The Rubens		Soda	Co-producer, Mixer	
2025	Keli Holiday	"Dancing2"		Producer, Co-Writer	
2025	Keli Holiday	"Ecstasy"		Producer, Co-Writer	
2026	Keli Holiday		Capital Fiction	Producer, Co-Writer	
2026	bbyclose	"dream about u"		Producer, Co-Writer	
2026	BLOND:ISH	"In Da Jungle"		Co-Producer	
2026	The Jungle Giants		Experiencing Feelings of Joy	Mixer, Additional Production	
2026	Contact Sports		Contact Sports	Producer, Co-Writer	
2026	Keli Holiday	"Love Was A Stranger"		Co-Producer, Co-Writer	
2026	The Rubens		Group Therapy	Producer, Mixer	
2026	Ellisar	"ATHEIST"		Producer, Co-Writer	
2026	Ellisar	"SEX & CIGARETTES"		Producer, Co-Writer	
2026	Keli Holiday	"Sunburnt St"		Co-Producer, Co-Writer	

== Awards and nominations ==
=== AIR Awards ===
The Australian Independent Record Awards (commonly known informally as AIR Awards) is an annual awards night to recognise, promote and celebrate the success of Australia's Independent Music sector.

Year	Nominee / work	Award	Result	Ref.
2024	Konstantin Kersting for DMA's How Many Dreams?	Independent Producer of the Year	Nominated	

=== ARIA Music Awards ===
Year	Category	Nominated work	Result	Ref.
2019	Producer of the Year	Konstantin Kersting for Tones and I – "Dance Monkey"	Nominated	
2019	Engineer of the Year	Konstantin Kersting for Tones and I – "Dance Monkey"	Nominated	
2021	Producer of the Year	Konstantin Kersting for The Rubens – 0202 and "Masterpiece"	Won	
2021	Engineer of the Year	Konstantin Kersting for The Rubens – 0202, "Masterpiece" and The Jungle Giants – Love Signs	Won	

=== APRA Awards ===
Year	Category	Nominated work	Result	Ref.
2025	Most Performed Dance/Electronic Work	Fisher & Kita Alexander - Atmosphere	Nominated	
2026	Song of the Year	"Dancing2" by Keli Holiday (Adam Hyde, Alex Cameron, Konstantin Kersting)	Nominated	
2026	Most Performed Alternative Work	"Dancing2" by Keli Holiday (Adam Hyde, Alex Cameron, Konstantin Kersting)	Nominated	
