= Young in Love =

Studio album by Kita Alexander
- Released: 22 March 2024
- Recorded: Byron Bay, 2023
- Genre: Pop
- Length: 32:16
- Label: Warner Australia
- Producers: Konstantin Kersting; Andy Mak; Thom Mak

Kita Alexander chronology
The One (2022)	Young in Love (2024)	Rage (2026)

Singles from Young in Love
- 1. "Queen" Released: 12 April 2023; 2. "7 Minutes in Heaven" Released: 9 June 2023; 3. "Date Night" Released: 28 July 2023; 4. "Best You Ever Had" Released: 3 November 2023; 5. "All Night" Released: 2 February 2024; 6. "Zodiac" Released: 22 March 2024

Young in Love is the debut studio album by Australian pop singer Kita Alexander, released by Warner Music Australia on 22 March 2024.

Young in Love debuted at number 61 on the ARIA Albums Chart and earnt Alexander a nomination for the Michael Gudinski Breakthrough Artist award at the 2024 ARIA Awards.

== Background and release ==
Australian musician Kita Alexander announced the album's title and release date on 2 November 2023.

Alexander wrote the album over a four-week period, dubbing the experience "personal". In an interview with NME Australia, she said: "Everybody is young and in love at least once in their lives. It's never easy, and it's never a fairytale. There's ups and downs, but being young and in love are two things that coexist beautifully. Whether it works out or it doesn't, everyone goes through it. There's all these fireworks and butterflies and big emotions, but there's also these creeping doubts and insecurities. You're still figuring out who you are. These are songs you can learn and grow with."

== Critical reception ==
Professional ratings
Review scores
Source	Rating
Rolling Stone Australia / New Zealand	3.5/5 stars

Lars Brandle, writing for Rolling Stone Australia / New Zealand, called the album "confident, breezy pop" and named "Best You Ever Had" and "Butterflies" amongst the album's highlights.

Courtney Thompson, of InStyle Australia, called the album "a glittering kaleidoscope of '80s bops, dance bangers and intimate acoustic ballads, it traces the arc of someone coming into themselves; figuring out what you want, letting go of what doesn't serve you, setting boundaries and finally giving yourself permission to assert them."

== Awards and nominations ==
ARIA Award nominations for Young in Love
Year	Nominee / work	Award	Result	Ref.
2024	Young in Love	Michael Gudinski Breakthrough Artist	Nominated	

== Track listing ==
Young in Love track listing
No.	Title	Writer(s)	Producer(s)	Length
1.	"7 Minutes in Heaven"	Nikkita Alexander; Andy Mak; Thom Mak	Andy Mak; Thom Mak	3:36
2.	"Queen"	Alexander; Shungudzo Kuyimba; A. Mak; T. Mak	Lionel Crasta; A. Mak; T. Mak	3:27
3.	"All Night" (featuring Laurel)	Alexander; Laurel Arnell-Cullen; Konstantin Kersting	Konstantin Kersting	2:50
4.	"Best You Ever Had"	Alexander; Kersting	Kersting	2:47
5.	"Date Night" (with Morgan Evans)	Alexander; A. Mak; T. Mak	A. Mak; T. Mak	2:51
6.	"Bigger Person"	Alexander; Kuyimba; A. Mak; T. Mak	A. Mak; T. Mak; Crasta^{[a]}	3:30
7.	"I Never Really Knew You"	Alexander; Kersting; Riley Smith	Kersting	3:29
8.	"Zodiac"	Alexander; Kersting	Kersting	3:13
9.	"Butterflies"	Alexander; Kersting	Kersting	3:38
10.	"Matter of Miles"	Alexander; Kuyimba; A. Mak; T. Mak	A. Mak; T. Mak	2:51
Total length:				32:16

Young in Love bonus streaming tracks
No.	Title	Writer(s)	Producer(s)	Length
1.	"Same Things"	Alexander; Kuyimba; A. Mak; T. Mak	A. Mak; T. Mak	2:49
2.	"Easy"			3:29
3.	"Figure It Out"			3:39
4.	"Communicate"			3:06
Total length:				13:03

Notes:

- ^{^[a]} signifies an additional producer.

== Personnel ==
Adapted from the album's liner notes.

- Kita Alexander – vocals, writing (all tracks)

=== Other musicians ===
- Scott Horscroft – mixing (1, 5, 10)
- Eric J Dubowsky – mixing (2, 4, 6)
- Konstantin Kersting – mixing (3, 7–9)

== Charts ==
Chart performance for Young in Love
Chart (2024)	Peak position
Australian Albums (ARIA)	61
