= Lay Down =

Lay Down may also refer to:

- "Lay Down" (DMA's song), 2015
- "Lay Down" (Strawbs song), 1972
- "Lay Down" (Touch Sensitive song), 2017
- "Lay Down", a song by Bad English from the 1989 album Bad English
- "Lay Down", a song by Caravan Palace from the 2015 album Robot Face
- "Lay Down", a song by Natasha Bedingfield from the 2007 album N.B.
- "Lay Down", a song by Priestess from the 2005 album Hello Master

== Other uses ==
- "Lay Down (Candles in the Rain)", a 1970 song by Melanie

== See also ==
- Keel laying or "laying down", the formal recognition of the start of a ship's construction.
- Way Down (disambiguation)
