= Laurel (musician) =

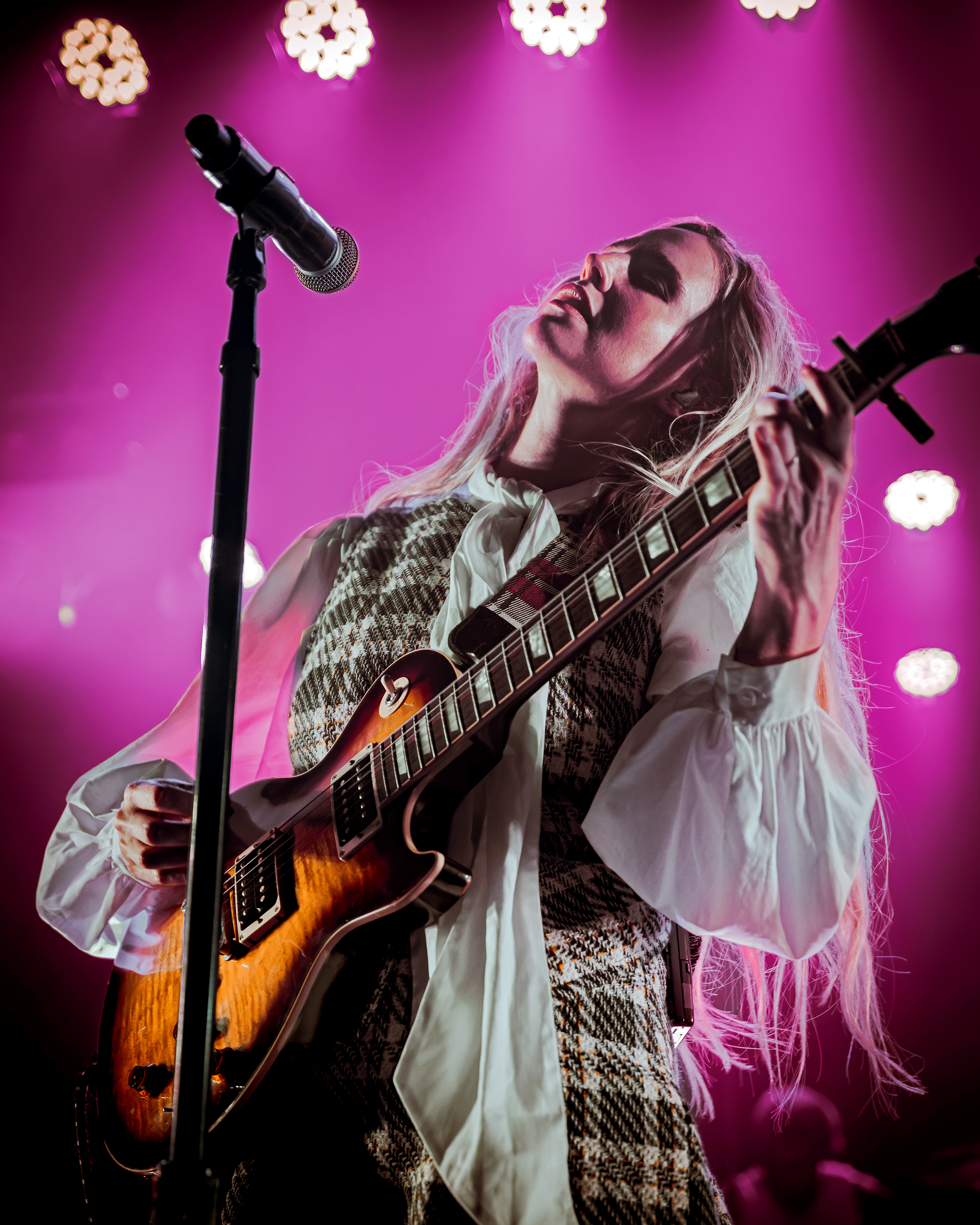
- Laurel (2025)

Background information
- Born: Laurel Mae Arnell-Cullen; 7 May 1994 (age 32); Portsmouth, England
- Genres: Chamber pop; alt pop; indie pop; synthpop; synthwave
- Occupations: Musician; producer; singer
- Instruments: Vocals; guitar; piano; synthesizer; bass; drums
- Years active: 2013–present
- Labels: Turn First Records; Next Time Records; Theia; Counter Records; Ninja Tune; 3 Vultures Records
- Spouse: Elliott Arndt (m. 2025)
- Website: classiclaurel.com

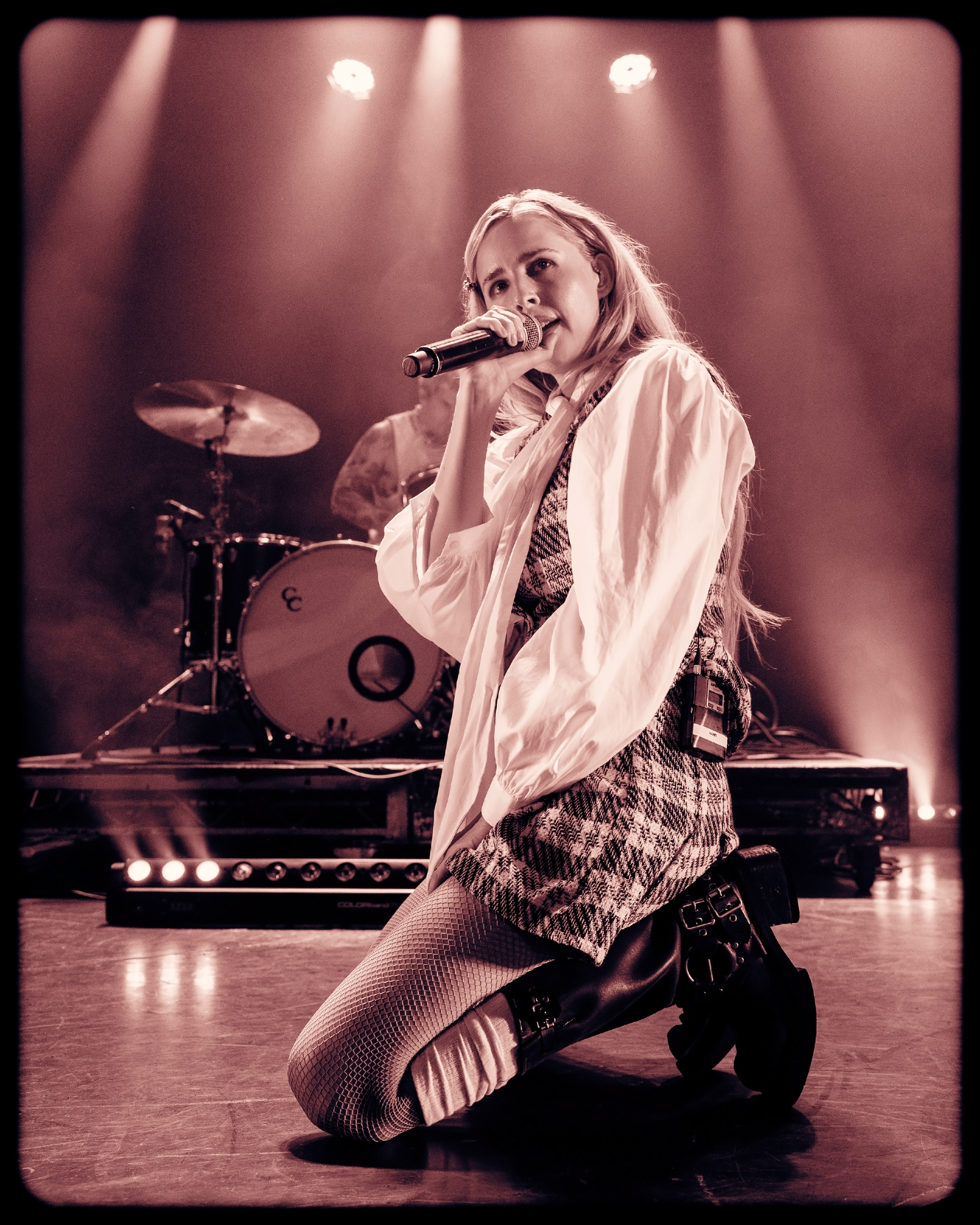
Laurel (2025)

Laurel Mae Arnell-Cullen (born 7 May 1994), better known as Laurel, is a British indie musician based in London. Laurel received critical acclaim for writing, recording and producing all her music in her bedroom studio in London.

== Early life ==
Arnell-Cullen grew up in Sarisbury Green, a village between Southampton and Portsmouth. Arnell-Cullen completed her studies at Havant and South Downs College in 2012.

== Career ==
Arnell-Cullen first caught interest from music bloggers in 2013 when she posted a demo for her song "Next time". She released "Fire Breather" as her first official single, via her SoundCloud the same year. She released her debut EP, To The Hills, in 2014 via her own record label, Next Time Records. In July 2015, she released a finished version of her song "Blue Blood" which, in demo form had gained much attention with online blogs.

In March 2016, Arnell-Cullen released "Life Worth Living" which would be the first track of her debut album released 3 years later. Unlike her previous work, it featured a strong indie rock influence with a leading electric guitar. In May 2016, she then dropped a second single titled "San Francisco". This single earned her the place of Apple Music's first Artist of the Week. In August 2016, it was announced Arnell-Cullen had signed to Counter Records, a division of Ninja Tune Records and that she would embark on her first headline UK tour in November, in support of her EP Park. "Hurricane" was released as the first single from Park in September 2016 and gained a lot of buzz from music bloggers and indie radio stations.

Arnell-Cullen released her debut album Dogviolet in 2018.

In August 2020, Arnell-Cullen released the single "Scream Drive Faster" from her EP titled Petrol Bloom. This represented a significant change in her musical style towards that of synthpop and synthwave, with more of a retro synth-based sound on her tracks, often similar to that of the 80s. She followed this up with "Best I Ever Had" that October and "Appetite" in December.

In spring 2021, Arnell-Cullen released another EP entitled "Limbo Cherry" from which she released the singles "You're the Onel, "Let Go" and "Wild Side".

Arnell-Cullen released her second album Palpitations in 2024.

== Artistry ==
As a small child, Arnell-Cullen listened to Britney Spears. As she grew older, she "fell in love with folk music" and was particularly impacted when she discovered Laura Marling's "New Romantic" at age 13, after which she took up guitar. In 2014, she stated she "get[s] a lot of inspiration from films and poetry… other musicians as well – a lot from hip-hop, and I love Florence + The Machine." Discussing her 2016 EP Park, Arnell-Cullen mentioned Talking Heads, Sonic Youth, Alex Calder, Gilla Band, Mac DeMarco and Tame Impala as influences.

== Personal life ==
Arnell-Cullen married Elliott Arndt of Faux Real at Le Grand Banc in Sainte-Croix-à-Lauze, Provence in 2025.

== Discography ==
=== Studio albums ===
Title	Details
Dogviolet	Release Date: 24 August 2018; Label: Counter Records
Palpitations	Release date: 14 June 2024; Label: Communion Group
Crying on the Tennis Court	* Release date: 22 January 2027: Label: 3 Vultures Records

=== Extended plays ===
Title	Details	Track listing
To the Hills	Released: 7 April 2014; Label: Next Time; Format: Digital download	1. "To the Hills"; 2. "Nicotine Dreams"; 3. "Shells"
Holy Water	Released: 15 December 2014; Label: Next Time; Format: Digital download	1. "I Forget"; 2. "Memorials"; 3. "Come Together" (feat. Sivu); 4. "Holy Water"
Park	Released: 18 November 2016; Label: Counter Records/Ninja Tune; Format: LP, digital download	1. "Maybe Baby"; 2. "Hurricane"; 3. "Too Far"; 4. "Goodbye" (Demo)
Petrol Bloom	Released: 3 December 2020; Label: Communion Group; Format: LP, digital download	1. "Scream Drive Faster"; 2. "Best I Ever Had"; 3. "Appetite"; 4. "When You're Walking Away"; 5. "Sometimes"
Limbo Cherry	Released: 18 June 2021; Label: Communion Group; Format: Digital download	1. "Let Go"; 2. "Obsessed"; 3. "You're The One"; 4. "Wild Side"; 5. "Drown in Sunlight"

=== Mixtapes ===
Title	Details	Track listing
Allelopathy	Released: 2 April 2015; Label: self-released; Format: Digital download	1. "Avena" (feat. FKA Twigs); 2. "Juglans" (feat. Yung Gud); 3. "Arctostaphylos" (feat. Yung Gud); 4. "Laurocerasus" (feat. Yung Gud); 5. "Rhus" (feat. Andru)

=== Singles ===
Year	Title	Album
2014	"Fire Breather"	—N/a
2014	"To the Hills"	To the Hills EP
2014	"Shells"	To the Hills EP
2014	"Memorials"	Holy Water EP
2015	"Blue Blood"	—N/a
2016	"Life Worth Living"	Dogviolet
2016	"San Francisco"	—N/a
2016	"Hurricane"	Park EP
2016	"Maybe Baby"	Park EP
2016	"Too Far"	Park EP
2018	"Lovesick"	Dogviolet
2018	"Same Mistakes"	Dogviolet
2018	"Crave"	Dogviolet
2018	"Adored"	Dogviolet
2020	"Scream Drive Faster"	Petrol Bloom EP
2020	"Best I Ever Had"	Petrol Bloom EP
2021	"You're the One"	Limbo Cherry EP
2021	"Let Go"	Limbo Cherry EP
2021	"Wild Side"	Limbo Cherry EP
2022	"Obsessed"	—N/a
2023	"Change"	Palpitations
2024	"Wild Things"	Palpitations
2024	"Burning Up"	Palpitations
2024	"45 Degrees"	Palpitations
2024	"Only One"	Palpitations
2024	"Kissing with the Top Down"	—N/a
2025	"Fucking You to Death"	—N/a
2025	"Bitter"	—N/a
2026	"French Kiss"	Crying on the Tennis Court
2026	"Crying on the Tennis Court"	Crying on the Tennis Court
2026	"Staring at the Sun" with Fisher	—N/a
2026	"Bow Down"	Crying on the Tennis Court

=== As featured artist ===
- "Down the Line" (2015) by Charles Hamilton
- "Nothing Ever Hurts" (2015) by Shadow Child with Ben Pearce
- "I Can't Tell" (2022) by Flume
- "Bringing Me Home" (2023) by Snakehips
- "All Night" (2024) by Kita Alexander
