= AIR Awards of 2018 =

Annual Australian music awards ceremony

- Date: 26 July 2018
- Venue: Queen's Theatre, Adelaide Australia

Highlights
- Most wins: Pnau (2)
- Most nominations: The Jungle Giants, RVG (4)
- Website: https://air.org.au/air-awards/2018-air-awards/

The AIR Awards of 2018 is the twelfth annual Australian Independent Record Labels Association Music Awards (generally known as the AIR Awards) and was an award ceremony at Queen's Theatre Adelaide, Australia on Thursday 26 July 2017.

In 2018, the Outstanding Achievement Award was introduced. The award recognises an individual or group who has made a significant and lasting contribution to the Australian Independent Music Community.

In an AIR Awards first, the award for Best Independent Album or EP was a tie this year, with both Methyl Ethel and The Jungle Giants being announced as winners.

Following the awards, AIR general manager, Maria Amato said "It was great to celebrate the success of the Australian Independent music sector at the 2018 AIR Awards in Adelaide last night. We are grateful to the South Australian Government for their continued support and to all our valued partners who helped us make it all happen."

== Performers ==
- Alex the Astronaut – "Not Worth Hiding"
- Bad//Dreems – "Feeling Remains"
- Baker Boy – "Mr La Di Da Di"
- Caiti Baker – "I Won't Sleep"
- Fanny Lumsden – "Elastic Waistband"
- Stella Donnelly – "Boys Will Be Boys"

== Outstanding Achievement Award ==
- Skinny Fish Music

== Nominees and winners ==
=== AIR Awards ===
Winners are listed first and highlighted in boldface; other final nominees are listed alphabetically.

Best Independent Artist	Best Independent Album
**Jen Cloher**; Alex Lahey; Baker Boy; The Jungle Giants; Stella Donnelly	**The Jungle Giants – Quiet Ferocity**; **Methyl Ethel – Everything Is Forgotten**; Alex Lahey – I Love You Like a Brother; Alex the Astronaut – See You Soon; Jen Cloher – Jen Cloher; RVG – A Quality of Mercy
Best Independent Single or EP	Breakthrough Independent Artist of the Year
**Alex Lahey – "Every Day's the Weekend"**; Baker Boy featuring Yirrmal – "Marryuna"; Methyl Ethel – "Ubu"; RVG – "A Quality of Mercy"; The Jungle Giants – "Feel the Way I Do"	**Baker Boy – "Marryuna"'**; Angie McMahon – "Slow Mover"; RVG – A Quality of Mercy; Stella Donnelly – Thrush Metal; The Jungle Giants – Quiet Ferocity
Best Independent Blues and Roots Album	Best Independent Classical Album
**All Our Exes Live in Texas – When We Fall**; Caiti Baker – Zinc; Dan Sultan – Killer; The Teskey Brothers – Half Mile Harvest; The Waifs – Ironbark	**Australian Chamber Orchestra/Richard Tognetti – Jonny Greenwood**; Grigoryan Brothers – Songs Without Words; Kate Miller-Heidke, Sydney Symphony Orchestra & Benjamin Northey – Live at the Sydney Opera House; Slava Grigoryan – Bach: Cello Suites Volume II; Sydney Chamber Choir & Paul Stanhope – Paul Stanhope: Lux Aeterna; Water – Wolfgang Amadeus / Mozart Night Music
Best Independent Country Album	Best Independent Dance/Electronica Album
**Fanny Lumsden – Real Class Act**; Caitlyn Shadbolt – Songs On My Sleeve; Halfway – Live at the Triffid; Lee Kernaghan – The 25th Anniversary Album	**Pnau – Changa**; Crooked Colours – Vera; Slumberjack – Fracture; Thrupence – Ideas of Aesthetics
Best Independent Dance, Electronica or Club Single	Best Independent Hard Rock, Heavy or Punk Album
**Pnau – "Go Bang"**; Banoffee – "Ripe"; Benson featuring Yeo – "Trying"; Confidence Man – "Bubblegum"; Motez featuring Antony and Cleopatra – "The Future"; Touch Sensitive – "Lay Down"	**King Gizzard and the Lizard Wizard – Murder of the Universe**; Bad//Dreems – Gutful; Northlane – Mesmer; RVG – A Quality of Mercy; Sleepmakeswaves – Made of Breath Only; The Smith Street Band – More Scared of You than You Are of Me
Best Independent Hip Hop Album	Best Independent Jazz Album
**Birdz – Train of Thought**; Allday – Speeding; Bliss n Eso – Off the Grid; Horrorshow – Bardo State; Winston Surfshirt – Sponge Cake	**James Morrison and BBC Concert Orchestra – The Great American Songbook**; Jeremy Rose – Within and Without; Joseph Tawadros – Live at Abbey Road; My Name Is Nobody – My Name Is Nobody; The Vampires – The Vampires Meet Lionel Loueke
Best Independent Label
**Milk! Records**

== See also ==
- Music of Australia
