= Rage (Kita Alexander album) =

Studio album by Kita Alexander
- Released: 26 June 2026
- Length: 36:37
- Label: Warner Australia
- Producer: Chris Collins

Kita Alexander chronology
Young in Love (2024)	Rage (2026)

Singles from Rage
- 1. "Rage" Released: 20 February 2026; 2. "The Good House" Released: 27 March 2026; 3. "Tell My Friends" Released: 24 April 2026; 4. "Sentimental Letter" Released: 22 May 2026; 5. "Worth It" Released: 26 June 2026

Rage (Note: Stylised in all caps.) is the second studio album by the Australian pop singer Kita Alexander, released by Warner Music Australia on 26 June 2026.

Rage debuted and peaked at number 11 on the ARIA Albums Chart upon release.

== Background and release ==
Australian musician Kita Alexander announced the title and release date of her second studio album on 20 February 2026.

Upon announcement, Alexander said: "Rage has been the catalyst of positive change in my life over the last couple of years. The album is about an emotion I've always had but never understood. It's me looking at it and embracing it as a new friend and realising that I don't have to shut it down or avoid looking at it... Rage has helped me find what truly matters to me and to change my life in ways that work for me."

== Critical reception ==
Professional ratings
Review scores
Source	Rating
The AU Review	4/5 stars

Peter Gray from the AU Review said "[Rage] is an album that largely inhabits an acoustic, reflective, storytelling space, allowing [her] songwriting to take centre stage. There are moments of sunshine and warmth throughout, but beneath the inviting melodies lies a deeper examination of identity, relationships, self-worth and the stories we tell ourselves to survive".

Women in Pop found Rage to be a "brilliantly crafted" album where Alexander has taken a "taboo topic—rage—and portrayed it in an unexpected way: with gentleness and calm. It is not a collection of songs that grabs you around the throat, but something much better in that it envelopes you in a wash of warm emotion."

== Track listing ==
Rage track listing
No.	Title	Writer(s)	Length
1.	"The Good House"	Nikkita Wright; PJ Harding; Shungudzo Kuyimba	2:23
2.	"Metal Detector Man"	Wright; Chris Collins; Matt Corby; Kuyimba	3:12
3.	"Sentimental Letter"	Wright; Collins; Kuyimba	3:15
4.	"Worth It"	Wright; Dan Gleyzer; Allie Kaplan; Kella; Kuyimba	3:23
5.	"Tell My Friends" (featuring Christopher)	Wright; Collins; Ehren Ebbage; Nailya	2:42
6.	"Avoidance"	Wright; Josh Grant; Kuyimba	3:29
7.	"Telepathy Is Real"	Wright; Harding; Kuyimba	2:55
8.	"Miss Australia"	Wright; Ebbage; Annie Schindel	3:19
9.	"Rage"	Wright; Ben Abraham; Corby; Kuyimba	3:13
10.	"Low Rise Jeans"	Wright; Collins; Kuyimba	2:19
11.	"Don't Call Me Sunshine"	Wright; Collins; Kuyimba	3:51
12.	"Sunday Girl"	Wright; Collins; Corby; Kuyimba	2:36
Total length:			36:37

== Personnel ==
Adapted from Tidal.

- Kita Alexander – vocals, writing (all tracks), acoustic guitar (7)

=== Other musicians ===
- Chris Collins – production (all tracks), keyboards (1–5, 7, 8, 10–12), guitar (1–5, 7, 8, 10, 11), percussion (1, 3–8, 10, 11), drums (1, 3–6, 8, 10, 11), bass (1, 3–5, 7, 8, 10, 11), backing vocals (1, 3), banjo (1, 5, 8), piano (4–7), vocals (10), acoustic guitar (12)
- Shungudzo – backing vocals (2–3, 6, 10–12)
- Matt Corby – backing vocals (2, 12); drums, percussion (2); piano (12)
- Rumi Wright – backing vocals (3)
- Will Henderson – trumpet (4, 11)
- Oli Jacobs – bass synthesizer (5)

== Charts ==
Chart performance for Rage
Chart (2026)	Peak position
Australian Albums (ARIA)	11
