= Learn to Exist =

Studio album by The Jungle Giants
- Released: 30 August 2013
- Genre: Indie pop
- Length: 40:30
- Label: Amplifire Music

The Jungle Giants chronology
She's a Riot (2012)	Learn to Exist (2013)	Speakerzoid (2015)

Singles from Learn to Exist
- 1. "I Am What You Want Me to Be" Released: May 2013; 2. "Skin to Bone" Released: 30 August 2013; 3. "A Pair of Lovers" Released: 4 April 2014

Learn to Exist is the debut studio album by Australian indie rock band The Jungle Giants. The album was released on 30 August 2013 and peaked at number 12 on the ARIA Charts.

== Critical reception ==
Professional ratings
Review scores
Source	Rating
The Australian	4/5 stars
The Sydney Morning Herald	4/5 stars
The AU Review	7/10 stars

Iain Sheddon from The Australian said "The Giants distinguish themselves from the rest with an unrelenting torrent of strong hooks and harmonies, all of them underpinned by choppy, infectious guitar riffs and a tight, punchy but unobtrusive rhythm section" adding "While the melodies are fresh and delivered with cheerful abandon, a whole album of them could prove too saccharine for regular consumption.".

Arne Sjostedt from The Sydney Morning Herald said "Learn to Exist is the right title for this enlivening group of indie-pop songs, as that is just what this band, and its members, are doing and singing about." adding "The Giants show a gigantic capacity for moving flexibly between subtle variations in indie music, and come out of it with a clean, fresh sound".

Sosefina Fuamoli from The AU Review called the album "an effort which perfectly encapsulates this fun and youthful vibe that has struck all the right chords with a steadily growing fan base around the country since 2011" adding "Overall, it's a fun and enthusiastic debut from The Jungle Giants and definitely will be a fan-pleaser."

Sarah Bella from Music Feeds said the album delivers "indie pop gems" calling "A Pair of Lovers" the standout track because the group "break their own mould and trying something new".

Tester McFlyn from The Music Network said "Learn to Exist is a diverse and exciting album from the young Brisbane band that sees them delving into exciting unknown territory. The Jungle Giants are honing their craft, exploring new sounds and learning to exist."

== Track listing ==
No.	Title	Length
1.	"Come and Be Alone with Me"	3:06
2.	"I Am What You Want Me to Be"	3:24
3.	"Got Nothing to Lose"	3:34
4.	"A Pair of Lovers"	2:56
5.	"Truth May Hurt"	5:37
6.	"Devil's in the Detail"	4:22
7.	"Skin to Bone"	3:34
8.	"She's a Riot"	3:34
9.	"Domesticated Man"	3:07
10.	"Anywhere Else"	4:01
11.	"Home"	3:18
12.	"I'll See You Tomorrow" (bonus track)	3:08

== Charts ==
Chart (2013)	Peak position
Australian Albums (ARIA)	12

== Release history ==
Region	Date	Format(s)	Label	Catalogue
Australia	30 August 2013	CD; digital download; vinyl	Amplifire Music	AMP001/AMP002
