= Big Grief =

2019 album by Waax

Studio album by Waax
- Released: 23 August 2019
- Recorded: 2019
- Studios: La Cueva Recording, Byron Bay, NSW
- Genres: Alternative rock, punk rock
- Length: 41:05
- Label: Dew Process
- Producers: Bernard Fanning; Nick DiDia

Waax chronology
Wild & Weak (2017)	Big Grief (2019)

Singles from Big Grief
- 1. "Labrador" Released: 27 April 2018; 2. "FU" Released: 27 February 2019; 3. "I Am" Released: 14 May 2019

Big Grief is the debut studio album by Australian rock band Waax, released on 23 August 2019 by Dew Process. It was produced by former Powderfinger frontman Bernard Fanning and Nick DiDia, it was recorded at Fannings and DiDia's studio in Byron Bay over the course of a year. The album marks lead guitarist Chris Antolak's last recording as a member of the band.

== Background and promotion ==
The album artwork was created by Cristina Daura. Describing the album, frontwoman Maz DeVita said:

"The whole album is about grief for so many things that I felt when we were writing the record and still do now. The way the world is so volatile at the moment, our environment, I talk about anxiety, mania, cutting ties with old friends and habits, my problems in the past with body image, and it's almost like a big mourning for all that. It's definitely an outpouring of grief in every sense of the word. But as much as I explored darker themes for Big Grief, I framed my melodies and vocal very colourfully and lively."

Shortly after the band signed to Dew Process they released their first single "Labrador" on 27 April 2018. The music video was released on 8 June.

On 24 February 2019, the band posted the date "27.02.2019" to their social media accounts, hinting at a new single release. The second single, "FU", was premiered on Triple J's Good Nights segment, and was then made commercially available a day later. On 9 April, a music video for "FU" was released.

On 14 May, Waax released their third single "I Am". On the same day they also announced an national tour for August, after their USA and Canadian tour. On 18 June, the music video for "I Am" was released.

== Writing and composition ==
The single "Labrador" as being about the Gold Coast suburb Labrador which frontwoman Maz DeVita described as a place where a significant relationship ended in her life. Speaking about the single "FU", DeVita said: "This song is about a situation with someone in your life who is taking advantage of you and finally having to acknowledge reality and stand up to them. I hope it’s as cathartic for the listener as it was to write." The track "History" details DeVita's experience in her teenage years wherein she suffered from an eating disorder. "Fade" is about a friend of DeVita's who went through a hard time being victim blamed and having no one believe them. DeVita explained the single "I Am" as being "about wanting to please someone so much that you forget who you are in the process."

== Critical reception ==
Professional ratings
Review scores
Source	Rating
Depth	8/10
Hysteria	9/10
The Music	4/5 stars
Wall of Sound	8/10

The album received positive reviews. Jack Walsh from Depth magazine praised it saying the album's good points were: "Empowering words through hard themes. Nice runtime. Incredible production. Vocal skills are untouchable." However criticised the bad points as: "At times it feels more like a collection of singles than a cohesive and continuous vibe." In a positive review from Wall of Sound, Rory McDonald said: "Big Grief is gold from front to back. [...] the band has stayed true to their authentic brand of punk and they have served it up nicely." In a 9-out-of-10 review, Hysteria praised DeVita's emotional vocal delivery of the lyrics. The Music, in a positive reviews states that: "WAAX have redefined what it means to be punk in the 21st century. This is an album that makes a point, one that sits on the top end of the anguish scale without sacrificing the band's melodic ingenuity."

== Track listing ==
Track listing adapted from Apple Music.

All tracks are written by Maz DeVita and Chris Antolak.

No.	Title	Length
1.	"Big Grief"	2:43
2.	"Labrador"	3:41
3.	"No Apology"	3:51
4.	"FU"	3:47
5.	"History"	3:50
6.	"Changing Face"	3:38
7.	"Fade"	3:39
8.	"Little Things"	3:36
9.	"I Am"	3:26
10.	"Why"	2:15
11.	"Last Week"	2:27
12.	"I.D.K.W.I.F.L" (stands for 'I Don't Know What It Feels Like')	4:12
Total length:		41:05

== Personnel ==
Adapted from the album's sleeve.

=== Musicians ===
Waax

- Marie "Maz" DeVita – vocals
- Chris Antolak – lead guitar
- Ewan Birtwell – rhythm guitar
- Tom Griffin – bass guitar
- Tom Bloomfield – drums

=== Technical ===
- Bernard Fanning – production, keyboard
- Nick DiDia – production, mixing, engineering
- Leon Zervos – mastering

=== Artwork ===
- Cristina Daura – album art

== Charts ==
Chart (2019)	Peak position
Australian Albums (ARIA)	11
