= Speakerzoid =

Studio album by the Jungle Giants
- Released: 7 August 2015
- Genre: Indie rock
- Length: 41:14
- Label: Amplifire Music

The Jungle Giants chronology
Learn to Exist (2013)	Speakerzoid (2015)	Quiet Ferocity (2017)

Singles from Speakerzoid
- 1. "Every Kind of Way" Released: 10 April 2015; 2. "Kooky Eyes" Released: 19 June 2015; 3. "Creepy Cool" Released: March 2016; 4. "Devil's Play" Released: June 2016

Speakerzoid is the second studio album by Australian indie rock band the Jungle Giants. The album was released on 7 August 2015 and peaked at number 25 on the ARIA Charts.

Lead singer Sam Hales explains the title comes from his girlfriend misunderstanding a lyric in a song. He said "Someone was playing the Sonic Youth song Teenage Riot' and my girlfriend thought she was saying 'Speakerzoid' (when she was saying 'spirit desire'). After a while I just really liked the word."

Upon release, Hales told The AU Review "We've always looked for the opportunity, if you've seen us live, whenever we get the chance, we'll lose our heads a bit and go crazy. With this record, we wanted to create more chances for that, more opportunities for a stage dive or anything like banging your head on guitars! It's a record that we wanted to make so that the live sets would come together as this big thing that, once you left, your brain would be a bit fried."

The album was supported by an Australian tour throughout September and October 2015 and the US in October and November 2015.

== Critical reception ==
Professional ratings
Review scores
Source	Rating
News.com.au	3/5 stars

Mikey Cahill from news.com.au gave the album 3 out of 5 called the album "fluttery" saying "this feels like the good album before a truly original, great album."

Chelsea Deeley from Music Feeds said "Whether you perceive it as an intelligent array of well-placed, interesting sounds, or a bit of a Jackson Pollack canvas with a few effective flicks; The Jungle Giants can be commended on their motivation to create an experimental indie-rock based record that's definitely worth mulling over."

Kim Taylor Bennett from Vice called the album a "louche, psych-toned pop collection" adding "There are some truly splendid moments on here, like the Bowie-meets-Pavement slice of lo-fi-pop 'What Do You Think'."

== Track listing ==
Speakerzoid track listing
No.	Title	Length
1.	"Every Kind of Way"	3:15
2.	"Devil's Play"	4:33
3.	"Kooky Eyes"	3:41
4.	"Lemon Myrtle"	2:40
5.	"What Do You Think"	3:55
6.	"Mexico"	1:31
7.	"Creepy Cool"	4:20
8.	"Not Bad"	3:40
9.	"It Gets Better"	4:13
10.	"Together We Can Work Together"	3:35
11.	"Tambourine"	5:51
12.	"Work It Out" (bonus track)	3:31

== Charts ==
Chart performance for Speakerzoid
Chart (2015)	Peak position
Australian Albums (ARIA)	25

== Release history ==
Release history and formats for Speakerzoid
Region	Date	Format(s)	Label	Catalogue
Australia	7 August 2015	CD; digital download; vinyl	Amplifire Music	AMP005/AMP006
