= She's a Riot =

EP by the Jungle Giants
- Released: 27 July 2012
- Genre: Indie pop
- Producer: Sam Hales

The Jungle Giants chronology
The Jungle Giants (2011)	She's a Riot (2012)	Learn to Exist (2013)

Singles from She's a Riot
- 1. "She's a Riot" Released: 25 June 2012; 2. "You've Got Something" Released: December 2012

She's a Riot is the second extended play by Australian indie rock band The Jungle Giants, released independently on 27 July 2012.

Lead singer Sam Hales said the songs reflected a time in his life when he experienced love for the first time, saying: "I've had good and bad experiences in relationships and it's good to draw from both the good and the bad."

== Critical reception ==
Stephen Rae from Music Feeds said that despite being new to the music scene, "[the Jungle Giants] have asserted themselves as real up-and-comers amidst an ever-growing scene." He added: "As a band that may be still finding their feet but are more than capable of producing some top quality in the process."

Antigone Anagnostellis from Purple Sneakers said: "[the Jungle Giants] down-to-earth lyrics and solid arrangements are reminiscent of an early Kooks or Jinja Safari. You can tell these guys were friends in high school – their musical talents fit well together."

Charley Rico from The Courier-Mail said the EP is full of "catchy riffs and full of pop-driven melodies".

== Track listing ==
She's a Riot track listing
No.	Title	Length
1.	"She's a Riot"	3:39
2.	"Don't Know What Else to Do"	4:10
3.	"You Got Something"	3:45
4.	"Way Back When"	4:38
5.	"Back to the Start"	3:51

== Charts ==
Chart performance for She's a Riot
Chart (2012)	Position
Australian Hitseekers Chart (ARIA)	14

== Certifications ==
Region	Certification	Certified units/sales
Australia (ARIA)	Gold	35,000^{‡}
^{‡} Sales+streaming figures based on certification alone.

== Release history ==
Release history and formats for She's a Riot
Region	Date	Format(s)	Label	Catalogue	Ref.
Australia	27 July 2012	Digital download	Create/Control	Not applicable	
Australia	27 July 2012	CD	Create/Control	CC0000009	
