= Hotel (Kita Alexander song) =

2017 single by Kita Alexander

- Arty Remix cover

Single by Kita Alexander

from the EP Hotel
- Released: 22 September 2017
- Genre: Pop
- Length: 3:33
- Label: Warner Music Australia
- Composer(s): Kita Alexander, Dann Hume
- Producer(s): Dann Hume

Kita Alexander singles chronology
"Damage Done" (2016)	"Hotel" (2017)	"Between You & I" (2019)

Music video
- "Hotel" on YouTube

"Hotel" is a song by Australian singer songwriter Kita Alexander. The song is track 1 on Alexander's extended play Hotel. The music video was released on 31 August 2017 The Arty Remix was released on 22 September 2017 and was sent to radio as the EPs second single. "Hotel" peaked at number 51 on the ARIA Singles Chart and was certified 2xplatinum in 2020.

== Track listing ==
Digital download (Original version)
No.	Title	Length
1.	"Hotel"	3:47

Digital download (Arty Remix)
No.	Title	Length
1.	"Hotel"	3:33

== Charts ==
Chart (2017)	Peak position
Australia (ARIA)	51

== Certifications ==
Region	Certification	Certified units/sales
Australia (ARIA)	2× Platinum	140,000^{‡}
New Zealand (RMNZ)	Gold	15,000^{‡}
^{‡} Sales+streaming figures based on certification alone.

== Release history ==
Region	Date	Format(s)	Label	Version
Australia	7 April 2017	Digital download, streaming	Warner Music Australia	EP version
Australia	22 September 2017	Digital download, streaming	Warner Music Australia	Arty Remix
