= Love Signs =

Studio album by the Jungle Giants
- Released: 23 July 2021
- Genres: Indie pop, electropop, dance-pop, indie rock
- Length: 40:27
- Label: Amplifire
- Producer: Sam Hales

The Jungle Giants chronology
| Quiet Ferocity (2017) | Love Signs (2021) | Experiencing Feelings of Joy (2026) |

Singles from Love Signs
- 1. "Heavy Hearted" Released: 8 July 2019; 2. "Sending Me Ur Loving" Released: 17 January 2020; 3. "In Her Eyes" Released: 17 November 2020; 4. "Treat You Right" Released: 30 April 2021; 5. "Love Signs" Released: 9 July 2021

Love Signs is the fourth studio album by the Australian indie pop band the Jungle Giants, released independently on 23 July 2021 through Amplifire Music. Love Signs was written and produced solely by frontman Sam Hales.

Preceded by five singles—"Heavy Hearted", "Sending Me Ur Loving", "In Her Eyes", "Treat You Right" and "Love Signs"—Love Signs debuted atop the ARIA Albums Chart, dethroning Quiet Ferocity as their highest-charting album in the process.

At the 2021 ARIA Music Awards, Konstantin Kersting was nominated for Engineer of the Year for work on this album.

At the 2022 Queensland Music Awards, the release won Album of the Year.

At the AIR Awards of 2022, the album was nominated for Independent Album of the Year and Best Independent Pop Album or EP.

== Background ==
Following the commercial success of Quiet Ferocity (2017), the Jungle Giants shifted to focus on more electronic and dance-centric music.

== Release ==
On 13 January 2020, Triple J published a piece discussing their most anticipated albums of the year, which revealed that the Jungle Giants were intending to release their fourth album the second half of that year. On 19 November, alongside the release of "In Her Eyes", Hales revealed that the album would be released in early 2021. On 24 May 2021, the band announced the album's title and release date. Love Signs was released on 23 July 2021 through Amplifire Music.

== Promotion ==
=== Singles ===
Love Signs was supported by four singles.

"Heavy Hearted" was released on 8 July 2019 as the album's lead single. "Heavy Hearted" peaked at number 62 on the ARIA Singles Chart, and was nominated for Song of the Year at the 2020 ARIA Music Awards.

"Sending Me Ur Loving" was released on 17 January 2020 as the album's second single. A music video was released alongside the single. "Sending Me Ur Loving" peaked at number 55 on the ARIA Singles Chart.

"In Her Eyes" was released on 17 November 2020 as the album's third single. An accompanying music video was released on 19 November 2020.

"Treat You Right" was released on 30 April 2021 as the album's fourth single. A music video was released on the same day.

"Love Signs" was released on 9 July 2021 as the fifth single as is an ode to modern-day love signs in the digital age, such as texts, tweets and tags for the person you're interested in.

=== Tour ===
Alongside the album's announcement, the band additionally revealed that they would be embarking on a national tour later that year, with Australian electronic producers Bag Raiders featuring as their opening act. The Love Signs tour is scheduled to begin on 3 September 2021, with dates in Hobart, Melbourne, Adelaide, Fremantle, Brisbane and Sydney.

== Track listing ==
All tracks are written by Sam Hales and Grace Stephenson.

Love Signs track listing
| No. | Title | Length |
|---|---|---|
| 1. | "Love Signs" | 4:14 |
| 2. | "Treat You Right" | 3:41 |
| 3. | "In Her Eyes" | 2:53 |
| 4. | "Sending Me Ur Loving" | 4:14 |
| 5. | "Heartless" | 4:24 |
| 6. | "Charge My Phone" | 3:25 |
| 7. | "Heavy Hearted" | 4:14 |
| 8. | "Here I Come" | 4:03 |
| 9. | "Something Got Between Us" | 4:26 |
| 10. | "Monstertruck" | 4:53 |
| Total length: | | 40:27 |

== Personnel ==
Credits are adapted from the album's liner notes and Tidal.

=== The Jungle Giants ===
- Andrew Dooris – performance
- Cesira Aitken – performance
- Keelan Bijker – performance
- Sam Hales – lead vocals, production, mixing

=== Additional contributors ===
- Konstantin Kersting – additional production, engineering, mixing
- Leon Zervos – mastering
- Timothy Lovett – photography, artwork, layout

== Charts ==
=== Weekly charts ===
Weekly chart performance for Love Signs
| Chart (2021) | Peak position |
|---|---|
| Australian Albums (ARIA) | 1 |

=== Year-end charts ===
Year-end chart performance for Love Signs
| Chart (2021) | Position |
|---|---|
| Australian Artist Albums (ARIA) | 14 |

== Release history ==
Release history and formats for Love Signs
| Region | Date | Format | Label | Catalogue | Ref. |
|---|---|---|---|---|---|
| Various | 23 July 2021 | Digital download; streaming | Amplifire | Not applicable | |
| Australia | 23 July 2021 | CD | Amplifire | AMP0024CD | |
| Australia | 23 July 2021 | LP | Amplifire | Various | |
