= Touch Sensitive (producer) =

Australian producer and musician

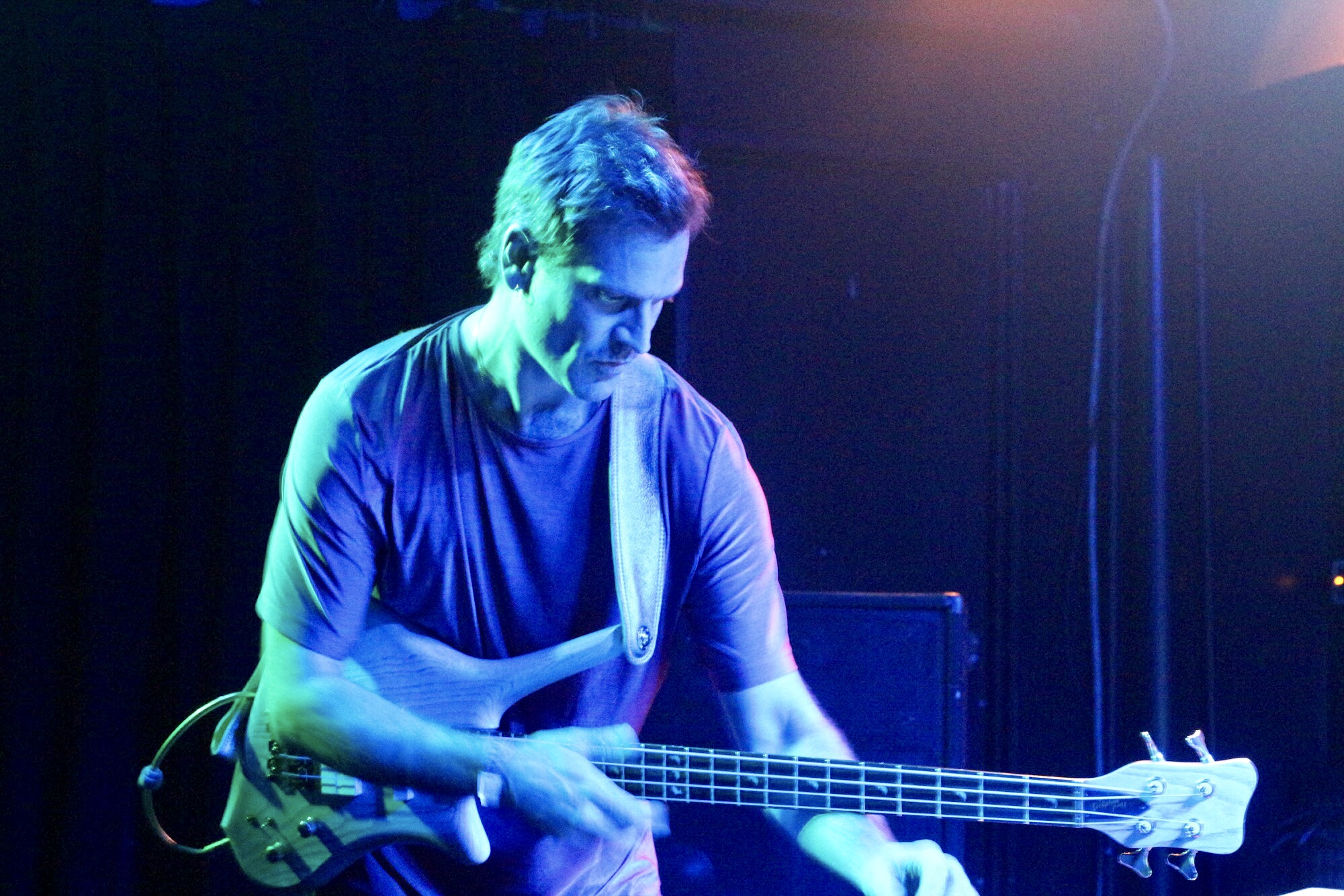
- Touch Sensitive in 2018

Background information
- Born: Michael Di Francesco
- Origin: Sydney, Australia
- Genres: EDM; nu-disco
- Occupations: Record producer; musician; DJ
- Years active: 2004-present
- Label: Future Classic

Touch Sensitive is the solo project of Michael Di Francesco, an Australian producer and musician from Sydney, also known as a member of Van She.

His debut single "Body Stop" was released in 2004. Touch Sensitive's 2013 single "Pizza Guy" attained popularity in an advertisement for Very.

In September 2017, Touch Sensitive released the debut album Visions. Visions debuted and peaked at number 48 on the Australian ARIA Charts.

Touch Sensitive has remixed songs from artists such as Rüfüs, Hayden James. He is a common sight at Australian Music festivals, such as Falls Festival, Listen Out, and Hot Dub Wine Machine.

== Discography ==
=== Studio albums ===
List of studio albums, with selected chart position
Title	Details	Peak chart positions
Title	Details	AUS
Visions	Released: 15 September 2017; Label: Future Classic (FCL161); Format: digital download, CD, streaming, LP	48
In Paradise	Released: 22 August 2025; Label: Future Classic; Format: digital download, CD, streaming, LP	—

=== Extended plays ===
List of extended plays with selected details
Title	Details
Touch Sensitive	Released: 2005; Label: Tinted Records (TINT 103); Format: digital download, CD
The 36th Level	Released: 22 November 2019; Label: Future Classic; Format: digital download, media streaming, LP
Cold Cuts	Scheduled: 9 December 2022; Label: Future Classic; Format: digital download, media streaming

=== Certified singles ===
List of singles released
Title	Year	Accreditations	Album
"Pizza Guy"/"Show Me"	2013	ARIA: Platinum	non-album single
"Lay Down"	2017	ARIA: 2× Platinum	Visions

== Awards and nominations ==
=== AIR Awards ===
The Australian Independent Record Awards (commonly known informally as AIR Awards) is an annual awards night to recognise, promote and celebrate the success of Australia's Independent Music sector.

Year	Nominee / work	Award	Result	Ref.
2018	"Lay Down"	Best Independent Dance/Electronic Club Song or EP	Nominated	
2026	In Paradise	Best Independent Jazz Album or EP	Nominated	

=== ARIA Music Awards ===
The ARIA Music Awards is an annual awards ceremony that recognises excellence, innovation, and achievement across all genres of Australian music. They commenced in 1987.

Year	Nominee / work	Award	Result	Ref.
2025	In Paradise	Best Jazz Album	Nominated	
