= Like You Want To =

2015 single by Kita Alexander

Single by Kita Alexander

from the EP Like You Want To
- Released: 19 October 2015
- Length: 3:55
- Label: Warner Music Australia
- Composers: Kita Alexander; Ben Romans
- Producer: Ben Romans

Kita Alexander singles chronology
"My Own Way" (2015)	"Like You Want To" (2015)	"Damage Done" (2016)

Music video
- "Like You Want To" on YouTube

"Like You Want To" is a song by Australian singer songwriter Kita Alexander. The song premiered on Triple J on 19 October 2015 and was released as a single from Alexander's second EP Like You Want To. Following the release of the EP, the song re-entered and peaked at number 82 on the ARIA Singles Chart in December 2015. It was certified gold in 2020.

== Music video ==
The music video was co-directed by Alexander and Zach Miller and shot in California, where Alexander recorded the song with producer Ben Romans.

== Reception ==
Mike Wass from Idolator described the song as a "dreamy anthem [that] is more than a nod to the past."

== Track listings ==
Digital download
No.	Title	Length
1.	"Like You Want To"	3:55

Digital download
No.	Title	Length
1.	"Like You Want To" (Juno Mars remix)	3:53
2.	"Like You Want To" (Juno Mars' Hackney dub)	5:32

== Charts ==
Chart performance for "Like You Want To"
Chart (2015–2016)	Peak position
Australia (ARIA)	82

== Certification ==
Certifications for "Like You Want To"
Region	Certification	Certified units/sales
Australia (ARIA)	Gold	35,000^{‡}
^{‡} Sales+streaming figures based on certification alone.

== Release history ==
Release history and formats for "Like You Want To"
Region	Date	Format(s)	Label	Version
Various	19 October 2015	Digital download	Warner Music Australia	single version
Australia	26 October 2015	Radio	Warner Music Australia	single version
Various	29 April 2016	Digital download	Warner Music Australia	Juno Mars Remix
