= The Jungle Giants =

Australian indie pop band

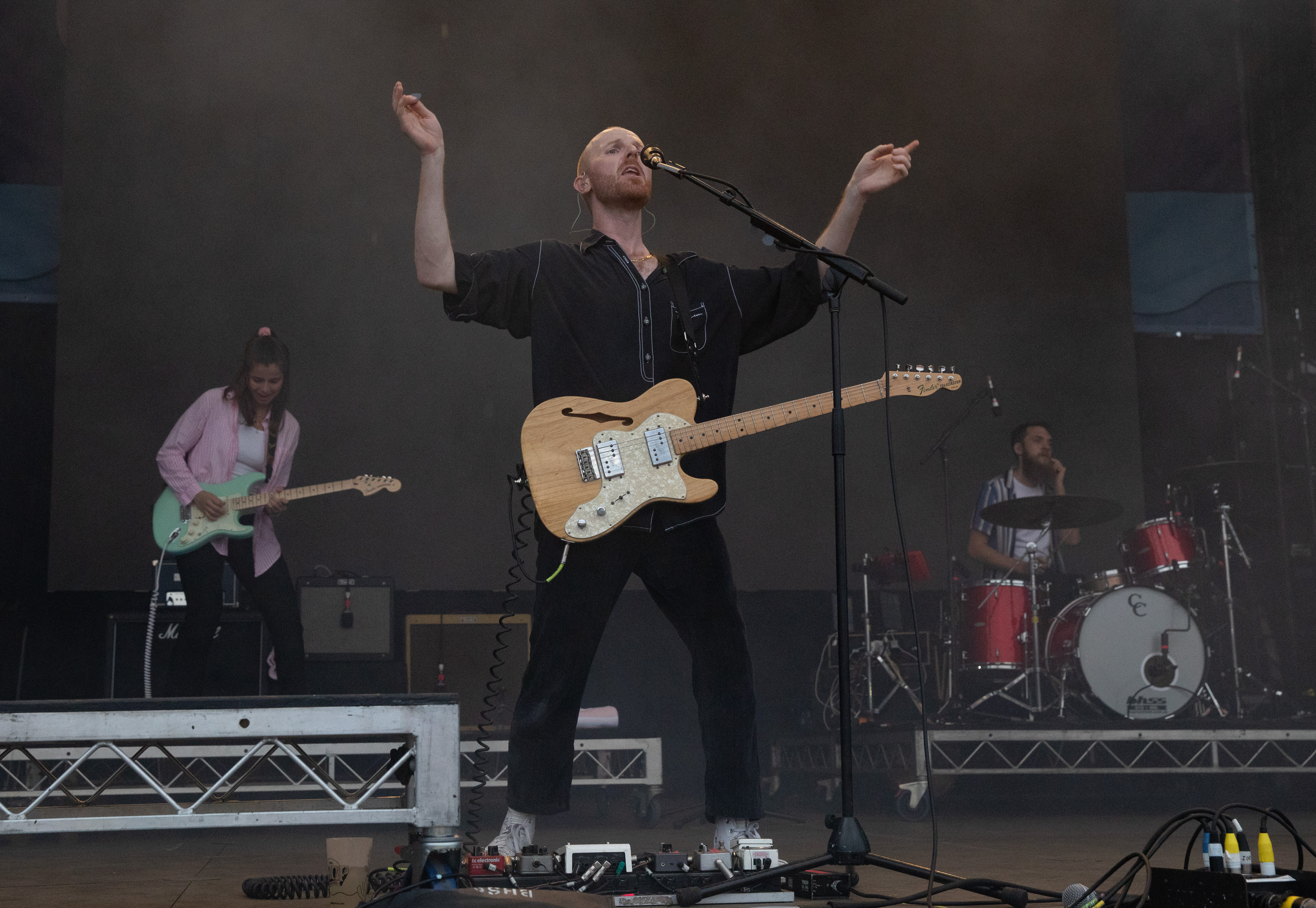
- The Jungle Giants performing in 2019

Background information
- Origin: Brisbane, Queensland, Australia
- Genres: Indie rock; indie pop
- Years active: 2011–present
- Label: Amplifier Music
- Members: Sam Hales; Cesira Aitken; Andrew Dooris; Keelan Bijker
- Website: www.thejunglegiants.com

The Jungle Giants are an Australian indie rock band from Brisbane, Queensland, who formed in 2011.

The band have released five full-length albums and two EPs. Their fourth studio album, Love Signs, was released on 23 July 2021.

== Career ==
=== 2011–2012: Early years and EPs ===
All four members of The Jungle Giants attended Mansfield State High School

=== 2013–2014: Learn to Exist ===
In May 2013, The Jungle Giants released "I Am What You Want Me to Be", the first track from their debut album Learn to Exist which was released 30 August 2013. The band toured Australia to celebrate the release which included both headline performances and appearances at Splendour in the Grass 2013 & Spin Off Festival. The album received positive reception overall. It was a featured album on national radio station Triple J in the week leading up to the release. The band extended the tour due to popular demand with extra shows in Brisbane, Sydney and Melbourne.

In 2014, the Jungle Giants performed on the national Big Day Out touring festival alongside acts such as Arcade Fire and Pearl Jam. They were also announced shortly afterwards to perform on the national regional touring festival Groovin' the Moo in April & May 2014, which includes performances by Dizzee Rascal, Disclosure, and Karnivool. The band additionally announced headline performances as part of the "Tuss Tour" that will take place shortly prior to their Groovin' The Moo performances, performing in Sydney, Brisbane, Melbourne and Perth.

=== 2015–2018: Speakerzoid and Quiet Ferocity ===
In August 2015, the band released their second studio album Speakerzoid.

In May 2017, their song "Come and Be Alone with Me" was featured in the trailer video for series 3 of Casual.

In July 2017, they released their third studio album, Quiet Ferocity. which spawned the singles "Feel the Way I Do", "On Your Way Down", "Bad Dream" and "Used to Be in Love". At the 2018 AIR Awards, the album won Best Independent Album or EP.

=== 2019–2021: Love Signs ===
On 8 July 2019, the Jungle Giants released the song "Heavy Hearted". In January 2020, the song polled at number 8 in Triple J's Hottest 100 of 2019, and became their first single to chart inside the ARIA Top 100 Singles Chart. On 17 January 2020, they released the single "Sending Me Ur Loving", which peaked at number 55 on the ARIA Singles Chart in February 2021.

On 24 May 2021, the band announced their fourth studio album, Love Signs. Love Signs was released on 23 July 2021.

=== 2022–present: Experiencing Feelings of Joy ===
On 10 March 2023, the band released "Trippin' Up"; the first song from the band's fifth studio record.

In March 2026, the band announced Experiencing Feelings of Joy would be released on 8 May 2026, alongside tour dates.

== Band members ==
- Sam Hales – vocals, guitar, lead songwriter, producer
- Cesira Aitken – lead guitar
- Andrew Dooris – bass
- Keelan Bijker – drums

The band members went to school together, at Mansfield State High School.

== Discography ==
=== Studio albums ===
List of studio albums, with release date, label, and selected chart positions shown
Title	Album details	Peak chart positions
Title	Album details	AUS
Learn to Exist	Released: 30 August 2013; Label: Amplifire Music (AMP001/AMP002); Format: CD, LP, digital download, streaming	12
Speakerzoid	Released: 7 August 2015; Label: Amplifire (AMP005/AMP006); Format: CD, LP, digital download, streaming	25
Quiet Ferocity	Released: 7 July 2017; Label: Amplifire (AMP008/AMP009); Format: CD, LP, digital download, streaming	11
Love Signs	Released: 23 July 2021; Label: Amplifire (AMP0022/AMP0024); Format: CD, LP, digital download, streaming	1
Experiencing Feelings of Joy	Released: 8 May 2026; Label: Amplifire (AMP0047); Format: CD, LP, digital download, streaming	3

=== Remix albums ===
List of remix albums, with release date, label, and selected details
Title	Album details
Love Signs Remixed	Released: 15 July 2022; Label: Amplifire (AMP0041); Format: LP, digital download, streaming

=== Extended plays ===
List of extended plays, with release date, label, and selected chart positions shown
Title	EP details	Peak chart positions
Title	EP details	AUS Heat.
The Jungle Giants	Released: 1 July 2011; Label: The Jungle Giants (independent); Format: CD, digital download	—
She's a Riot	Released: 27 July 2012; Label: Create/Control (CC0000009); Format: CD, digital download	14

=== Singles ===
List of singles, with year released, selected chart positions and certifications, and album name shown
Title	Year	Peak chart positions		Certifications	Album
Title	Year	AUS	NZ Hot	Certifications	Album
"Mr Polite"	2011	—	—	ARIA: Gold	The Jungle Giants
"No One Needs to Know"	2011	—	—		The Jungle Giants
"She's a Riot"	2012	—	—	ARIA: Gold	She's a Riot
"You've Got Something"	2012	—	—		She's a Riot
"I Am What You Want Me to Be"	2013	—	—		Learn to Exist
"Skin to Bone"	2013	—	—		Learn to Exist
"A Pair of Lovers"	2014	—	—		Learn to Exist
"Every Kind of Way"	2015	—	—		Speakerzoid
"Kooky Eyes"	2015	—	—		Speakerzoid
"Creepy Cool"	2016	—	—		Speakerzoid
"Devil's Play"	2016	—	—		Speakerzoid
"Feel the Way I Do"	2017	—	—	ARIA: 2× Platinum; RMNZ: Gold	Quiet Ferocity
"On Your Way Down"	2017	—	—	ARIA: Gold; RMNZ: Gold	Quiet Ferocity
"Bad Dream"	2017	—	—	ARIA: Platinum	Quiet Ferocity
"Used to Be in Love"	2018	—	—	ARIA: 2× Platinum; RMNZ: Platinum	Quiet Ferocity
"Heavy Hearted"	2019	61	—	ARIA: Gold; RMNZ: Gold	Love Signs
"Sending Me Ur Loving"	2020	55	40	ARIA: Gold; RMNZ: Gold	Love Signs
"In Her Eyes"	2020	—	—		Love Signs
"Treat You Right"	2021	—	—		Love Signs
"Love Signs"	2021	—	33		Love Signs
"When You Feel Like This" (with Hermitude)	2022	—	—		Mirror Mountain
"Trippin Up"	2023	—	—		Non-album singles
"Rakata" (with Renee)	2023	—	—		Non-album singles
"Hold My Hand"	2025	—	—		Non-album singles
"Tell Me How It Feels"	2026	—	—		Experiencing Feelings of Joy
"Is It Love?"	2026	—	—		Experiencing Feelings of Joy
"A Moment Like That"	2026	—	—		Experiencing Feelings of Joy

=== Other charted and certified songs ===
List of other charted and certified songs
Title	Year	Peak chart positions	Certifications	Album
Title	Year	NZ Hot	Certifications	Album
"Come and Be Along with Me"	2013	—	ARIA: Gold	Learn to Exist
"Quiet Ferocity"	2017	—	ARIA: Gold	Quiet Ferocity
"Lovesick"	2026	22		Experiencing Feelings of Joy

== Awards and nominations ==
=== AIR Awards ===
The Australian Independent Record Awards (colloquially known as the AIR Awards) is an annual awards ceremony to recognise, promote and celebrate the success of Australia's independent music sector.

Year	Nominee / work	Award	Result	Ref.
2018	Themselves	Best Independent Artist	Nominated	
2018	Quiet Ferocity	Best Independent Album	Won	
2018	"Feel the Way I Do"	Best Independent Single / EP	Nominated	
2018	The Jungle Giants / Quiet Ferocity	Breakthrough Independent Artist	Nominated	
2020	"Heavy Hearted"	Best Independent Dance or Electronica Album or EP	Won	
2021	Sending Me Ur Loving	Independent Song of the Year	Nominated	
2021	Sending Me Ur Loving	Best Independent Dance, Electronica or Club Single	Nominated	
2022	Love Signs	Independent Album of the Year	Nominated	
2022	Love Signs	Best Independent Pop Album or EP	Nominated	
2023	Love Signs (Remixes)	Best Independent Dance or Electronica Album or EP	Nominated	
2024	"Trippin' Up"	Best Independent Dance, Electronica or Club Single	Nominated	

=== ARIA Music Awards ===
The ARIA Music Awards are annual awards, which recognises excellence, innovation, and achievement across all genres of Australian music. They commenced in 1987.

Year	Nominee / work	Award	Result	Ref.
2020	"Heavy Hearted"	Song of the Year	Nominated	
2021	Konstantin Kersting for Love Signs by The Jungle Giants	Engineer of the Year	Nominated	

=== Queensland Music Awards ===
The Queensland Music Awards (previously known as Q Song Awards) are a series of annual awards celebrating Queensland, Australia's brightest emerging artists and established legends. They commenced in 2006.

Year	Nominee / work	Award	Result (wins only)	Ref.
2013	Themselves / "I Am What You Want Me to Be"	People's Choice Award Most Popular Group	Won	
2018	Quiet Ferocity	Album of the Year	Won	
2019	"Used to Be in Love"	Rock Song of the Year	Won	
2020	"Heavy Hearted"	Song of the Year	Won	
2020	"Heavy Hearted"	Pop Song of the Year	Won	
2022	Love Signs	Album of the Year	Won	
