= Quiet Ferocity =

Studio album by the Jungle Giants
- Released: 7 July 2017
- Studios: Empire (Brisbane, QLD)
- Length: 41:43
- Label: Amplifire Music
- Producers: Sam Hales; Konstantin Kersting

The Jungle Giants chronology
Speakerzoid (2015)	Quiet Ferocity (2017)	Love Signs (2021)

Singles from Quiet Ferocity
- 1. "Feel the Way I Do" Released: 31 January 2017; 2. "On Your Way Down" Released: 12 May 2017; 3. "Bad Dream" Released: 1 August 2017; 4. "Used to Be in Love" Released: 28 March 2018

Quiet Ferocity is the third studio album by Australian indie rock band the Jungle Giants, released on 7 July 2017 through Amplifire Music. The album peaked at number 11 on the ARIA Charts, becoming the band's highest charting album.

Frontman Sam Hales said "For Quiet Ferocity we found a studio close to home and treated it like a job, clocking on and off everyday, and because I was producing it as well everything was quicker – there was no middle man. There was a certain flow to it, it's like we found our tempo, the particular speed we like to work at." Hales later added "We were so excited to get this record out because we'd been sitting on it for a couple of months."

The album was support by a national tour between August and September 2017.

At the AIR Awards of 2018, the album won Best Independent Album or EP.

At the 2018 Queensland Music Awards, the album won Album of the Year.

== Critical reception ==
Professional ratings
Review scores
Source	Rating
The Music	4/5 stars

Jessica Dale from The Music wrote that "Sam Hales and co have created a fun, jangly release that surely holds hits that will see you through to the warm summer months." adding tracks like 'People Always Say' and 'Time and Time Again' show maturity and growth in The Jungle Giants sound and it's easy to hear that producing the works themselves has influenced their updated sound."

Triple J called the album "groove fuelled", adding the band have "ended up with ten sleek dance rock tracks".

Brooke Hunter from Girl magazine felt that "Quiet Ferocity has that easy listening vibe that reminds you of summer road-trips", adding "All the songs have that infectious happy-feel that keeps you wanting more."

== Track listing ==
No.	Title	Length
1.	"On Your Way Down"	3:45
2.	"Feel the Way I Do"	3:25
3.	"Bad Dream"	4:31
4.	"Used to Be in Love"	3:42
5.	"Quiet Ferocity"	5:38
6.	"Time and Time Again"	4:15
7.	"Waiting for a Sign"	3:16
8.	"Blinded"	3:28
9.	"In the Garage"	5:13
10.	"People Always Say"	4:31
Total length:		41:43

== Charts ==
Chart performance for Quiet Ferocity
Chart (2017)	Peak position
Australian Albums (ARIA)	11

== Release history ==
Release history for Quiet Ferocity
Region	Date	Format(s)	Label	Catalogue
Australia	7 July 2017	CD; digital download; vinyl	Amplifire Music	AMP009
