= Way Down (disambiguation) =

"Way Down" is a 1977 song by Elvis Presley.

Way Down or Waydown may also refer to:

- Way Down (album), by Curtis Amy, 1962
- "Way Down", a song by Au5 from the 2019 album Monstercat - 8 Year Anniversary
- "Way Down", a song by Modest Mouse from the 1997 album The Fruit That Ate Itself
- "Way Down", a song by Ocean Alley from the 2020 album Lonely Diamond
- "Way Down", a song by MØ from the 2018 album Forever Neverland
- "Waydown", a song by Catherine Wheel from the 1995 album Happy Days
- The Vault (2021 film), a Spanish action thriller film also known by the title Way Down

== See also ==
- Lay Down (disambiguation)
