= Holy Sick =

2015 EP by Waax

EP by Waax
- Released: 29 September 2015
- Studios: Airlock Studios, Brisbane, QLD
- Genres: Alternative rock, garage rock, grunge rock
- Length: 11:12
- Label: Independent
- Producer: Konstantin Kersting

Waax chronology
Holy Sick (2015)	Wild & Weak (2017)

Singles from Big Grief
- 1. "Wisdom Teeth" Released: 23 May 2014; 2. "I for an Eye" Released: 3 June 2015; 3. "Holy Sick" Released: 4 October 2015

Holy Sick is the debut EP by Australian rock band Waax, released independently on 29 September 2015 through SoundCloud, and commercially on 14 December. It was produced by Konstantin Kersting and recorded at Airlock Studios in Brisbane. It was the last recording to feature bassist and guitarist Ariana Pelser and Elijah Gall respectively, only appearing on the track "Wisdom Teeth".

== Background and promotion ==
Waax's debut single "Wisdom Teeth" was released on 23 May 2014. "Wisdom Teeth" was submitted to Triple J Unearthed and won on 28 July, earning the band a spot on the Triple J Unearthed BIGSOUND showcase lineup. A music video for "Wisdom Teeth" was released on 8 December.

Their second single, "I for an Eye" was released on 3 June 2015. The music video followed on 16 July.

Without any prior announcements, the EP Holy Sick was released on 29 September.

The third single, "Holy Sick" was released on 4 October. On 16 December a music video for "Holy Sick" was released, two days after the EP's commercial release.

Waax later performed a five-date Holy Sick EP Tour in December.

== Writing and composition ==
The single "I for an Eye" has frontwoman Maz DeVita "questioning herself and her place, particularly as a female, in the music industry, followed by the anger at herself for feeling insignificant." The title-track "Holy Sick" has been described as dissing then-Prime Minister Tony Abbott and his views on immigration.

== Critical reception ==
Professional ratings
Review scores
Source	Rating
AAA Backstage	4/5
The AU Review	8.7/10

The EP received positive reviews. Jack Doonar from AAA Backstage, praising the grungy hard rock sound, said: ""Holy Sick" is 11 minutes and 14 seconds of pure WAAX. Frontwoman Marie DeVita leads a young band that’s smart enough to known there’s more to rock than just turning it up to eleven." The AU Review rated it 8.7/10 and praised DeVita's vocal range saying: "[DeVita] has an incredibly wide range, going from angry howling to soulful and evocative crooning, sometimes within the same line."

Carmel Lewis from Blank Gold Coast gave it a positive review, saying: "Waax and Holy Sick are an absolute pleasure, in a warped way, to see, hear, dance, laugh, cry and tear your teeth out to."

== Track listing ==
No.	Title	Length
1.	"I for an Eye"	2:44
2.	"Holy Sick"	2:49
3.	"CC Thugs"	3:29
4.	"Wisdom Teeth"	2:10
Total length:		11:12

== Personnel ==
Adapted from SoundCloud.

Waax

- Marie DeVita – vocals, album artwork
- Elijah Gall – lead guitar (only on track 4)
- Chris Antolak – lead guitar
- Ewan Birtwell – rhythm guitar
- Ariana Pelser – bass (only on track 4)
- Tom Griffin – bass
- Tom Bloomfield – drums

Production

- Konstantin Kersting – producer, mixing, recording
- Scott Horscroft – mixing, mastering
- Dave Neil – mixing, mastering
- Steve Smart – mastering
