= Experiencing Feelings of Joy =

Studio album by The Jungle Giants
- Released: 8 May 2026
- Length: 40:49
- Label: Amplifire
- Producers: Michael Belsar; Sam Hales

The Jungle Giants chronology
Love Signs (2021)	Experiencing Feelings of Joy (2026)

Singles from Experiencing Feelings of Joy
- 1. "Tell Me How It Feels" Released: 20 February 2026; 2. "Is It Love?" Released: 20 March 2026; 3. "A Moment Like That" Released: 17 April 2026

Experiencing Feelings of Joy is the fifth studio album by the Australian indie pop band the Jungle Giants. The album was announced in March 2026 and released on 8 May 2026 through Amplifire Music.

The album was nominated for The Triffid 2026 Queensland Album of the Year.

== Singles ==
The album's lead single, "Tell Me How It Feels" was released on 20 February 2026. Upon release, writer Sam Hales said "'Tell Me How It Feels' brought me back to my first days with music, and naturally my single mother, who did everything she could to support me. She's a badass, and a punk when it comes to love, so it felt really special to bring her into this album, in the same way that she brought me into music."

"Is It Love?" was released on 20 March 2026 as the album's second single. Chris Salce from Acid Stag said "'Is It Love?' captures the journey we've all faced within a new relationship, those feelings of confusion and excitement, all set to a trademark uplifting soundscape that carries optimism and wonder throughout."

"A Moment Like That" was released on 17 April 2026. Hales said "It's me backing myself, being in myself again and feeling confident".

== Tour ==
Alongside the album's announcement, the band additionally revealed that they would be embarking on an Australian and New Zealand tour, commencing in June 2026.

== Track listing ==
All tracks are written by Sam Hales, except "Tell Me How It Feels" (written by Hales and Cesira Aitken).

Experiencing Feelings of Joy track listing
No.	Title	Length
1.	"Tell Me How It Feels"	3:23
2.	"A Moment Like That"	4:07
3.	"Where Can I Put All My Love"	3:12
4.	"All the Time in the World"	5:12
5.	"How Can I Replace You"	4:34
6.	"In a Nice Way"	4:09
7.	"Are You Seeing Anyone?"	4:38
8.	"Lovesick"	3:54
9.	"Is It Love?"	4:12
10.	"World's Getting Smaller"	3:28
Total length:		40:49

== Personnel ==
Credits are adapted from Tidal.

=== The Jungle Giants ===
- Sam Hales – lead vocals, production, engineering
- Cesira Aitken – performance
- Keelan Bijker – performance
- Andrew Dooris – performance

=== Additional contributors ===
- Michael Belsar – production, engineering
- Konstantin Kersting – mixing, additional production and engineering on "Where Can I Put All My Love"
- Leon Zervos – mastering
- Shaan Ramaprasad – string production, string engineering
- Running Touch – vocal engineering
- Mimi Versace – violin on "Where Can I Put All My Love"
- Sophie Ellis – viola on "Where Can I Put All My Love"
- Emma Hales – cello on "Where Can I Put All My Love"

== Charts ==
Chart performance for Experiencing Feelings of Joy
Chart (2026)	Peak position
Australian Albums (ARIA)	3
