= The Vernons =

Australian musical group

- Origin: Gold Coast, Queensland, Australia
- Genres: Blues rock
- Years active: 2011–present
- Members: Hugh Tait; James Nikiforides; Jonny Nyst
- Website: http://www.thevernonsband.com

The Vernons are an Australia blues rock formed on the Gold Coast, Queensland in 2011.

== History ==
The Vernons formed in 2011 when James Nikiforides asked Jonny Nyst to join a band he had put together with Elliot Gooch and Andrew Lahey. Lahey left the band in 2012 and was replaced by Hugh Tait; while Gooch left in 2014 and the band has since been working with guest musicians in his place.

The band's debut EP, Volume I was released in 2013, was produced by Yanto Browning (The Medics, Art of Sleeping, Mosman Alder) and its first single, "Standing in Line", reached the top of the iTunes Blues chart. Second single, "White Wine", spawned a noteworthy video which quietly generated 200,000 views on YouTube. "Shake 'n' Roll" from the EP was later featured in a T-Mobile advertising campaign in the United States.

Volume II, released in 2014, was produced by Musicians Hall of Famer, Louie Shelton, who has worked with a stunning array of artists (Michael Jackson, Seals and Crofts, The Wolverines among them). "To the Sky" from this EP won the Queensland Music Award for Best Regional Song.

Produced by Konstantin Kersting (Moses Gunn Collective, Belligerents, Junkyard Diamonds), "Snap My Fingers", the first single from a third EP, Snap, was released 7 August 2015 and a follow-up, "Keep On Dreaming", launched 6 November 2015, the same day the EP became available.

In addition to successful headline tours behind the band's single and EP releases, The Vernons have supported other acts across the genres, sharing the stage with Wolfmother, Seasick Steve, The Rubens, Wolf & Cub, Hoodoo Gurus, Stonefield and Ash Grunwald. The band also played major Australian festival, Big Day Out.

== Discography ==
=== Extended plays ===
Title	Details
Volume I	Released: September 2013; Label: The Vernons; Format: digital download
Volume II	Released: October 2014; Label: The Vernons; Format: digital download
Snap	Released: November 2015; Label: The Vernons; Format: digital download
Desire	Released: October 2020; Label: The Vernons; Format: digital download

=== Singles ===
Title	Year	Album
"Standing in Line"	2013	Volume I
"White Wine"	2013	Volume I
"Rolling Back to You"	2014	Volume II
"To the Sky"	2014	Volume II
"Snap My Fingers"	2015	Snap
"Mona Lisa"	2015	Snap
"She's Not Mine"	2016	Desire
"Mistress"	2020	Desire
"Do What You Wanna Do"	2020	Desire

== Awards ==
=== Queensland Music Awards ===
The Queensland Music Awards (previously known as Q Song Awards) are annual awards celebrating Queensland, Australia's brightest emerging artists and established legends. They commenced in 2006.

Year	Nominee / work	Award	Result (wins only)
2015	"To the Sky"	Regional Song of the Year	Won
