= Pizza Guy (song) =

2013 single by Touch Sensitive

Single by Touch Sensitive
- Released: April 2013
- Recorded: 2013
- Length: 5:49
- Label: Future Classic
- Songwriter(s): Michael Di Francesco; Harley Streten

Touch Sensitive singles chronology
"Real Talk" (2012)	"Pizza Guy" (2013)	"Teen Idols" (2014)

Music video
- "Pizza Guy" on YouTube

"Pizza Guy" is a song by Australian record producer Touch Sensitive released in April 2013 as a double-A sided single with "Show Me".

== Details ==
Upon release, Touch Sensitive said "The whole track is based on one simple idea, the ostinato melody that just repeats and repeats while the bass line moves around under it; the long release times of the synth playing the ostinato melodies notes gives the impression there are chords there when there aren't really any". The music video was released in May 2013.

The song was released in the United Kingdom in July 2015.

== Critical reception ==
Jim from Backseat Mafia said "'Pizza Guy' opens with these gently pulsating analogue synths, as these chords underneath stay static, like a carpet. As it progresses there's more evidence of that classic 80s sound – the wiry electronic sounds, the warm, plopping bassline as it develops into something that brings the funk to the party, almost Prince style in some ways." Jim added "There's these vocals cut ups to die for as over the top the electro sounds cascade and bubble away."

== Versions ==
Digital download / 12" LP (FCL80)

- "Pizza Guy" – 5:49
- "Pizza Guy" (Lauer Remix) – 6:45
- "Show Me" – 5:32

Digital download / 12" LP remixes (FCL80DLX)

- "Pizza Guy" – 5:49
- "Pizza Guy" (Fantastic Man Remix) – 6:29
- "Pizza Guy" (I:Cube Remix) – 6:05
- "Pizza Guy" (I:Cube Dub) – 5:58

== Certifications ==
Certifications for "Pizza Guy"/"Show Me"
Region	Certification	Certified units/sales
Australia (ARIA)	Platinum	70,000^{‡}
^{‡} Sales+streaming figures based on certification alone.
