= Between You & I =

Single by Kita Alexander
- Released: 10 May 2019
- Genre: Indie pop
- Length: 4:13
- Label: Warner Music Australia
- Composers: Kita Alexander; Bnann; Jonny Harris
- Producer: Ghostwriter

Kita Alexander singles chronology
"Hotel" (2017)	"Between You & I" (2019)	"Against the Water" (2020)

Music video
- "Between You & I" on YouTube

"Between You & I" is a song by Australian singer-songwriter Kita Alexander, released on 10 May 2019 via Warner Music Australia. The song is built around a sample of "Everybody Wants to Rule the World" by Tears for Fears.

Speaking on the release of the song, Alexander said she wrote the song "a couple of years ago" and explained that the song is "a hopeful anthem in the face of adversity. I wanted people who feel defeated in love and wounded by the great divide it causes to know that love will always be stronger if you can persist and make it through."

The song was certified gold in Australia in 2020.

== Critical reception ==
The Music Network called the song an "indie pop jam".

== Credits and personnel ==
Credits adapted from Spotify.

- Kita Alexander – vocals, writing
- Bnann – writing
- Jonny Harris – writing
- Ghostwriter – production

== Certifications ==
Region	Certification	Certified units/sales
Australia (ARIA)	Gold	35,000^{‡}
New Zealand (RMNZ)	Gold	15,000^{‡}
^{‡} Sales+streaming figures based on certification alone.
