= Lay Down (Touch Sensitive song) =

2017 single by Touch Sensitive

Single by Touch Sensitive

from the album Visions
- Released: 30 May 2017
- Length: 4:15
- Label: Future Classic
- Songwriter(s): Michael Di Francesco

Touch Sensitive singles chronology
"Teen Idols" (2014)	"Lay Down" (2017)	"No Other High" (2017)

Music video
- "Lay Down" (lyric video) on YouTube

"Lay Down" is a song by Australian record producer Touch Sensitive released in May 2017 as the lead single from his debut studio album, Visions. The song was certified double platinum in Australia in April 2024.

At the AIR Awards of 2018, the song was nominated for Best Independent Dance/Electronic Club Song or EP.

== Critical reception ==
Troy Mutton from Pilerats called it "A shimmering slice of piano house, slowed down just a smidge like only Touch Sensitive knows how, giving it some room to groove and breathe on the dancefloor."

The Interns called it "an extremely groovy cut with some soulful vocals thrown in the mix too."

== Certifications ==
Certifications for "Lay Down"
Region	Certification	Certified units/sales
Australia (ARIA)	2× Platinum	140,000^{‡}
^{‡} Sales+streaming figures based on certification alone.
