= On Your Way Down =

Single by The Jungle Giants

from the album Quiet Ferocity
- Released: 12 May 2017
- Genre: Indie, alternative
- Length: 3:45
- Label: Amplifire
- Songwriters: Sam Hales; Cesira Aitken; Andrew Dooris; Keelan Bijker

The Jungle Giants singles chronology
"Feel the Way I Do" (2017)	"On Your Way Down" (2017)	"Bad Dream" (2017)

"On Your Way Down" is a song by Australian indie-pop band The Jungle Giants. It was released in May 2017 as the second single from the band's third studio album Quiet Ferocity. The single was certified gold in Australia in February 2019.

Band member Sam Hales said "'On Your Way Down' is one of the main sonic identifiers for me on the record. It has a simple arrangement, though melodically it's very intense. I love how it makes you want to dance, but also clench your fists."

== Reception ==
Emmy Mack from Music feeds described the track as an "infectiously groovy chilled-out toe-tapper" and "dancefloor-friendly".

== Track listing ==
Digital download

1. "On Your Way Down" – 3:45

== Certifications ==
Region	Certification	Certified units/sales
Australia (ARIA)	Gold	35,000^{‡}
^{‡} Sales+streaming figures based on certification alone.
