= Bad Dream (song) =

Single by The Jungle Giants

from the album Quiet Ferocity
- Released: 1 August 2017
- Genre: Indie, alternative
- Length: 4:31
- Label: Amplifire
- Songwriter(s): Sam Hales; Cesira Aitken; Andrew Dooris; Keelan Bijker

The Jungle Giants singles chronology
"On Your Way Down" (2017)	"Bad Dream" (2017)	"Used to Be in Love" (2018)

Music video
- "Bad Dream" on YouTube

"Bad Dream" is a song by Australian indie-pop band The Jungle Giants. It was released in August 2017 as the third single from the band's third studio album Quiet Ferocity. The singles was certified gold in Australia in February 2019.

Band member Sam Hales said "'Bad Dream' was the last song written for the record. We were having a party at my house [and] I hadn't show anyone the song and then I played it over the speakers and everyone was like, ‘That should be on the record!’ and then it was."

== Certifications ==
Region	Certification	Certified units/sales
Australia (ARIA)	Platinum	70,000^{‡}
^{‡} Sales+streaming figures based on certification alone.
