= Waax (band) =

Australian band

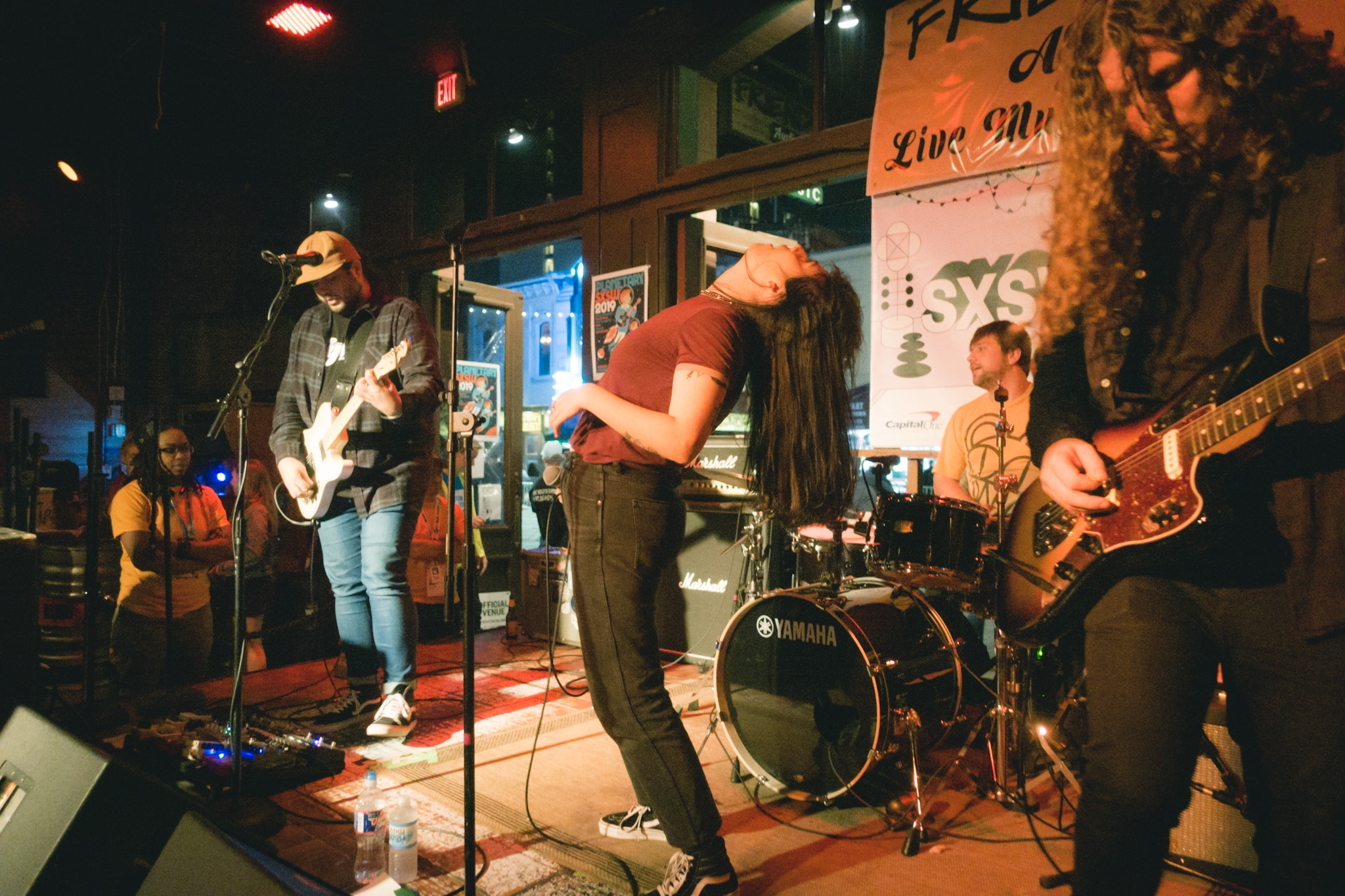
- Waax performing at SXSW 2019

Background information
- Origin: Brisbane, Queensland, Australia
- Genres: Alternative rock; indie rock; punk rock; post-punk
- Years active: 2012–2023, 2023–present
- Label: Dew Process
- Members: Marie DeVita
- Past members: Ewan Birtwell; Tom Bloomfield; Ariana Pelser; Elijah Gall; Chris Antolak; Tom Griffin; James Gatling
- Website: waaxband.com

Waax (stylised as WΛΛX; pronounced "wax") are an Australian rock band from Brisbane, Queensland that formed in 2012. The band was co-founded by drummer Tom Bloomfield and lead vocalist Marie "Maz" DeVita, who oversaw every iteration of the line-up until 2023. Waax have released three studio albums – Big Grief (2019), At Least I'm Free (2022) and Angel's Mess (2026) – as well as two independent EPs Holy Sick (2015) and Wild & Weak (2017).

The band won the Triple J Unearthed competition at BIGSOUND in 2014, and their single "Labrador" won the No. 1 spot on the independent Brisbane radio station 4ZZZ's Hot 100 in 2018. In 2019, the single was voted into Triple J's Hottest 100 of 2018 at No. 88. In 2022, they again won the No.1 spot on 4ZZZ's Hot 100 with their single "Most Hated Girl".

In April 2023, the band announced they were to go on hiatus. Following what were believed to be the band's final shows that June, DeVita announced in November 2023 that she would be continuing the band as its sole member.

== History ==
=== 2012–2015: Early years and Holy Sick ===
Waax was formed in June 2012 by Marie DeVita on vocals, bass and keys; Elijah Gall on lead guitar; Ewan Birtwell on rhythm guitar; and Tom Bloomfield on drums. Shortly after forming, DeVita moved into a strictly vocal role, and the band recruited Ariana Pelser as their full-time bassist.

Their debut single "Wisdom Teeth", released on 23 May 2014, earned the band a spot on the Triple J Unearthed stage at that year's BIGSOUND festival and lifted the band to national prominence.

Pelser left the band in February 2015, followed by Gall shortly thereafter. The pair were replaced with Tom Griffin on bass and Chris Antolak on lead guitar. Waax's next single, "I For an Eye", was released in June and added to the band's popularity. An accompanying music video was released a month later. Their newfound visibility in the mainstream also landed them opportunities to perform as a support act for Australian bands such as Kingswood, The Delta Riggs, Ecca Vandal, Emperors and Stonefield, and international bands like Guitar Wolf and Upset.

Throughout their touring, the band found time to record and release their first EP, Holy Sick. The EP was released to SoundCloud on 29 September 2014 with no prior announcement. The EP was met with praise from fans and positive reviews from critics. On 14 December, the EP was made commercially available as a digital download and on CD. Also in December, the band embarked on their first headlining tour throughout Australia.

=== 2016–2017: Restructuring and Wild & Weak ===
After a brief period of restructuring, Waax released the single "Same Same" on 21 November 2016, with a music video following on 6 February 2017. Another single, "Nothing Is Always", was released on 8 March, followed shortly thereafter by the title track from their second EP, Wild & Weak. The EP was released independently on 7 June. Drummer Tom Bloomfield described the band's new sound as "something spicy, like a really hot burrito". To promote the release of the EP, the band performed a ten-date national tour.

=== 2018–2020: Antolak's departure and Big Grief ===
During Fall Out Boy's Australian Mania tour, Waax opened for them as a support band at four shows from February to March 2018. Signing a label deal with Universal imprint Dew Process, Waax released their single "Labrador" on 27 April, a month after announcing they would perform a twelve-date national tour in its support. They also supported Scottish rock band Biffy Clyro on their Australian tour. During Waax's performance at Splendour in the Grass in July, former Powderfinger frontman Bernard Fanning joined them onstage to sing "Don't Wanna Be Left Out" by Powderfinger. In December, Waax performed at all three dates of the inaugural Good Things festival.

In January 2019, during the band's performance at the 2019 UNIFY festival, DeVita announced that their then-untitled debut album would be released in June. On 24 February, the band posted to their social media accounts hinting at a new single release. Later revealed to be titled "FU", the track was premiered a day early on Triple J's Good Nights program. On 9 April, a music video for the single was released. On 18 April, the band announced their debut North American tour, which was scheduled for July 2019. For unknown reasons, the tour was quietly cancelled.

On 21 April 2019, during a performance at The Cambridge Hotel in Newcastle, frontwoman Maz DeVita was reportedly assaulted by a crowd member. She later took to social media to discuss her outrage. On 10 May, the band announced that they had parted ways with guitarist Chris Antolak. In an interview with Australian Guitar Magazine, guitarist Ewan Birtwell refused to answer a question regarding Antolak's departure. "I’m sure in the future something will be said, but I don’t really know how to tackle that one right now," he said.

On 14 May 2019, Waax released a new single, "I Am". DeVita described the song as being "about wanting to please someone so much that you forget who you are in the process." A music video for the track was released on 18 June, and the following day, the band's debut album was officially announced with the title Big Grief, and a release date of 23 August. The band also announced their new lead guitarist, James Gatling. During the week leading up to the album's release, it was spotlighted as Triple J's Feature Album, which saw all 12 of its tracks receive airtime. Big Grief premiered on the ARIA Charts at #11 (#3 Australian album, #2 on vinyl).

On 22 April 2020, Waax released a cover of Julia Jacklin's "Pool Party".

=== 2021–present: At Least I'm Free, split, revival and Angel's Mess ===
In August 2021, the band posted on their social media seeking auditions for a new lead singer for the band. Later that month, it was revealed to be a publicity stunt to promote their new single "Most Hated Girl". In the single's music video, DeVita plays a radio DJ leading an on-air competition to find a new lead singer for the band, before ultimately taking the role herself. In April 2022, the band shared the double A-side single of "Dangerous" and "Help Me Hell". The former was co-written with songwriter Linda Perry, marking the first time Waax had ever used a songwriter outside of the band. With the release of the songs came details of At Least I'm Free, their second studio album. In June, a third single entitled "Read Receipts" was shared. The album was released on 12 August 2022. A supporting 22-date national tour began on October 6, but was cancelled less than a month later on November 2, 2022, after just nine shows.

In April 2023, the band announced they were going on hiatus. The band announced a final show at Brisbane venue The Triffid on June 9, 2023. After the show sold out, two further shows were added on June 4 and 8, respectively.

In November 2023, nearly five months after the final shows, DeVita announced via social media that she would be reviving WAAX and continuing on as its sole member. "The WAAX community is who I am, and sometimes you need to take things away to get some perspective," she wrote. "Although we hold a lot of love, the boys are no longer continuing with me - life happens, being in a band is hard. But the more I thought about it, this project has always been an evolution of my songwriting and it felt weird to walk away."

In March 2026, Waax released their third studio album Angel's Mess independently via Drunk On Power Records. Its release was preceded by the release of three singles: "Ur A Rat" in August 2025, "Hands" in November 2025 and "Uh Oh (Bardcore Girls)" in February 2026.

== Musical style ==
Frontwoman Marie DeVita describes the band's style as "a mixture of post-punk and alternative rock".

DeVita is the band's primary songwriter, with prior assistance coming from then-lead guitarist Chris Antolak. On the creation of their Wild & Weak EP, drummer Tom Bloomfield shared how DeVita, while writing the lyrics, "was really getting into delving into her internal struggles and [he thought] that's what has inspired the record. Really emotive both lyrically and musically."

== Band members ==
Current members

- Marie "Maz" DeVita – lead vocals, occasional guitar (2012–2023, 2023–present), bass (2012–2013), keyboards (2013−2017)

Current touring musicians

- Izzy de Leon – bass, keyboards, backing vocals (2021–2023, 2023–present)
- Karelia Moloney – guitar (2023–present)
- Jonathan Tooke – guitar, backing vocals (2024–present)
- Rangi Barnes – drums (2024–present)
- Vincent McIntyre – guitar (2025–present)

Former members

- Jordan Cardenas − guitar (2012–2013)
- Ariana Pelser – bass (2013–2015)
- Elijah Gall – guitar (2013–2015)
- Chris Antolak – guitar, backing vocals (2015–2019)
- Tom Griffin – bass (2015–2021)
- James "Flames" Gatling – guitar, backing vocals (2019–2022)
- Tom Bloomfield – drums (2012–2023), backing vocals (2021–2023)
- Ewan Birtwell – guitar (2013–2023), backing vocals (2019–2023), bass (2021–2022)

Former touring musicians

- Michael Richards − drums (2018)
- Michael Hardy – drums, guitar (2019)
- Campbell Burns – guitar (2023)

== Discography ==
=== Studio albums ===
List of studio albums
Title	Details	Peak chart positions
Title	Details	AUS
Big Grief	Released: 23 August 2019; Label: Dew Process; Format: CD, LP, digital download, streaming	11
At Least I'm Free	Released: 12 August 2022; Label: Dew Process; Format: CD, LP, digital download, streaming	20
Angel's Mess	Released: 13 March 2026; Label: Drunk on Power; Format: CD, LP, digital download, streaming	83

=== Extended plays ===
List of extended plays
Title	EP details
Holy Sick	Released: 29 September 2015; Label: Self-released; Format: CD-R, Digital download, streaming
Wild & Weak	Released: 2 June 2017; Label: Self-released; Format: CD-R, digital download, streaming

== Awards and nominations ==
=== ARIA Music Awards ===
The ARIA Music Awards is an annual awards ceremony that recognises excellence, innovation, and achievement across all genres of Australian music.

Year	Nominee / work	Award	Result	Ref.
2026	Angel's Mess	Best Hard Rock/Heavy Metal Album	Nominated	

=== National Live Music Awards ===
The National Live Music Awards (NLMAs) commenced in 2016 to recognise contributions to the live music industry in Australia.

Year	Nominee / work	Award	Result	Ref.
2018	WAAX	Live Act of the Year	Nominated	
2018	WAAX	Best New Act	Nominated	
2018	WAAX	Queensland Live Act of the Year	Won	
2018	Best Live Voice of the Year - People's Choice	Marie Devita (WAAX)	Nominated	
2019	WAAX	Live Act of the Year	Nominated	
2019	WAAX	Live Indie / Rock Act of the Year	Nominated	
2020	WAAX	Live Act of the Year	Nominated	
2020	WAAX	Queensland Live Act of the Year	Nominated	
2020	Tom Bloomfield (WAAX)	Live Drummer of the Year	Nominated	
2023	WAAX	Best Live Act in QLD	Nominated	
2023	Marie DeVita (WAAX)	Best Live Voice in QLD	Nominated	

=== Queensland Music Awards ===
The Queensland Music Awards (previously known as Q Song Awards) are annual awards celebrating Queensland, Australia's brightest emerging artists and established legends. They commenced in 2006.

Year	Nominee / work	Award	Result (wins only)	Ref.
2018	"Same Same" by Waax (directed by Gregory Kelly, Pernell Marsden)	Video of the Year	Won	
2022	"Most Hated Girl"	Rock Award	Won	
2023	"No Doz"	Rock Award	Won	
