= Sending Me Ur Loving =

2020 song by the Jungle Giants

Single by the Jungle Giants

from the album Love Signs
- Released: 17 January 2020
- Length: 4:13
- Label: Amplifire; Together We Can Work Together
- Songwriter: Sam Hales
- Producer: Hales

The Jungle Giants singles chronology
"Heavy Hearted" (2019)	"Sending Me Ur Loving" (2020)	"In Her Eyes" (2020)

Music video
- "Sending Me Ur Loving" on YouTube

"Sending Me Ur Loving" is a song by Australian indie pop band the Jungle Giants, released on 17 January 2020 as the second single from the band's fourth studio album Love Signs (2021).

Written and produced by the band's lead singer Sam Hales, the song debuted and peaked at number 55 on the ARIA Chart in February 2021, following Triple J's Hottest 100 of 2020 in January 2021, where it placed at number 8.

At the AIR Awards of 2021, the song was nominated for Independent Song of the Year and Best Independent Dance, Electronica or Club Single.

== Background ==
Upon release, the Jungle Giants' frontman Sam Hales said, "'Sending Me Ur Loving' has been with me for so long, it's been such a pleasure watching it finally form into a complete track that represents the new production direction. The chorus had originally been Changed attached to a different song, and by some stroke of luck clicked right into this beat. It's an ode to a feeling of self confidence, and essentially a love ditty at the same time."

== Reception ==
Al Newstead from Triple J called it "a new hip-twitching single" saying "it further pushes the band's occupation into a unique venn diagram where dance music and kooky indie pop overlap, with neat choppy guitars skirting an infectious beat built with some of that thong-slapping tubular bass in the mix."

Bruce Baker from The AU Review said "It's trademark Jungle Giants, with the jangly guitars, soaring vocals and a tune you want to shake your booty to."

== Track listings ==
Digital download

1. "Sending Me Ur Loving" (Fouk 1am remix) – 4:13

Digital download

1. "Sending Me Ur Loving" (Tom Trago remix) – 4:23

Digital download

1. "Sending Me Ur Loving" (Matrefakt Remix remix) – 7:10

== Charts ==
Chart performance for "Sending Me Ur Loving"
Chart (2021)	Peak position
Australia (ARIA)	55
New Zealand Hot Singles (RMNZ)	40

== Certifications ==
Region	Certification	Certified units/sales
Australia (ARIA)	Gold	35,000^{‡}
New Zealand (RMNZ)	Gold	15,000^{‡}
^{‡} Sales+streaming figures based on certification alone.
