= Used to Be in Love =

Single by The Jungle Giants

from the album Quiet Ferocity
- Released: 28 March 2018
- Genre: Indie, alternative
- Length: 3:42
- Label: Amplifire
- Songwriters: Sam Hales; Cesira Aitken; Andrew Dooris; Keelan Bijker

The Jungle Giants singles chronology
"Bad Dream" (2017)	"Used to Be in Love" (2018)	"Heavy Hearted" (2019)

Music video
- "Used to Be in Love" on YouTube

"Used to Be in Love" is a song by Australian indie-pop band The Jungle Giants. It was released in March 2018 as the fourth and final single from the band's third studio album Quiet Ferocity. The single was certified platinum in Australia in December 2019.

Band member Sam Hales said "When we first recorded this song it wasn't even a dance song. The song was being super stubborn and I told it, 'If you don't want to get on the bus and go to the beach with everyone else then you can stay at home.' But then we put a 4x4 dance pattern in the song and it became something else entirely."

At the Queensland Music Awards of 2019, "Used to Be in Love" won Rock Song of the Year.

== Track listing ==
Digital download

1. "Used to Be in Love" – 3:42

== Certifications ==
Region	Certification	Certified units/sales
Australia (ARIA)	2× Platinum	140,000^{‡}
^{‡} Sales+streaming figures based on certification alone.
