= Heavy Hearted (song) =

2019 song by the Jungle Giants

Single by the Jungle Giants

from the album Love Signs
- Released: 8 July 2019
- Length: 4:16
- Label: Amplifire; Together We Can Work Together
- Songwriter: Sam Hales
- Producer: Hales

The Jungle Giants singles chronology
"Used to Be in Love" (2018)	"Heavy Hearted" (2019)	"Sending Me Ur Loving" (2020)

Music video
- "Heavy Hearted" on YouTube

"Heavy Hearted" is a song by Australian indie pop band the Jungle Giants, released on 8 July 2019 as the lead single from the band's fourth studio album Love Signs (2021). It was written, produced, recorded and engineered by lead singer, songwriter, and guitarist Sam Hales Remixes were released in October 2019.

The single was certified gold in Australia in January 2020. At the AIR Awards of 2020, the remixes EP won Best Independent Dance or Electronica Album or EP, and at the Queensland Music Awards of 2020, "Heavy Hearted" won Song of the Year and Pop Song of the Year.

== Background ==
Upon release, The Jungle Giants' frontman Sam Hales told Triple J, "It's probably the deepest and furthest I' ve gone into engineering, recording and playing almost everything. It's got pop sensibility but it's a big play-around with sounds. It was such a pleasure to make." Hales added "'Heavy Hearted' has been with me as an me as an instrumental track for so long that I'd forgotten the title a bunch of times and nearly lost it in my sessions. That bass line and beat would always creep its way back into my mind though. It's been a sweet journey watching the track grow and it just feels right to share it."

== Reception ==
Alex Gallagher from Music Feeds said "The groovy, primarily electronic track builds around a syncopated piano line and has a big collage of sounds behind it – while maintaining a kind of big pop energy to the whole thing."

== Track listings ==
Digital download

1. "Heavy Hearted" – 4:16

Limited Edition 7" vinyl (AMP0011)

1. "Heavy Hearted" (original)
2. "Heavy Hearted" (Fouk Remix)

Digital download

1. "Heavy Hearted" (Fouk 1am remix) – 5:27
2. "Heavy Hearted" (Greg Wilson & Ché Wilson 2am remix) – 5:34
3. "Heavy Hearted" (Gerd Janson 3am remix) – 6:41
4. "Heavy Hearted" (Nachtbraker’s Universal Interpretation 4am remix) – 5:53

== Charts ==
=== Weekly charts ===
Chart (2020)	Peak position
Australia (ARIA)	61

=== Year-end charts ===
Chart (2020)	Position
Australian Artist (ARIA)	28

== Certifications ==
Region	Certification	Certified units/sales
Australia (ARIA)	Gold	35,000^{‡}
^{‡} Sales+streaming figures based on certification alone.
