= Faux Real (duo) =

French-American art pop duo

Faux Real is a French-American art pop duo consisting of brothers Elliott Arndt and Virgile Arndt.

== History ==
The duo began in 2020, releasing singles and their first EP titled Faux Real, which was co-produced by Jay Watson. In 2024, the duo returned with their debut album, titled Faux Ever, through City Slang. Prior to the albums release, the duo released the singles "Rent Free", "Walking Away from My Demons", "Hi Tension", and "Love on the Ground". The album received positive reviews. In late 2024, the duo announced a North American headlining tour for 2025. In May 2026, the duo released "That Far" as the lead single from their second studio album, Poison Time. The album was released on September 4, 2026.

== Discography ==
=== Studio albums ===
- Faux Ever (2024), City Slang
- Poison Time (2026), b4

=== EPs ===
- Faux Real (2020), self-released
