= Kita Alexander =

Australian musician

- Alexander in 2024

Background information
- Born: Nikkita Kalea Alexander; 25 February 1996 (age 30); Brisbane, Queensland, Australia
- Origin: Port Macquarie, New South Wales, Australia
- Genre: Pop
- Occupations: Singer; songwriter; musician
- Instruments: Vocals; guitar
- Years active: 2011–present
- Label: Warner Music Australia
- Website: kitaalexander.com

Nikkita Kalea "Kita" Alexander (born 25 February 1996) is an Australian pop singer-songwriter from Brisbane, Queensland. Her single "Hotel" peaked at number 51 on the ARIA Singles Chart in November 2017 and was certified 2× platinum by the Australian Recording Industry Association (ARIA) in 2020. Alexander released her debut studio album, Young in Love in March 2024. With the rising success of her Australian headline tour in 2025, her fanbase has officially been known as "Kita's Angels".

== Early life ==
Nikkita Kalea Alexander was born on 25 February 1996 in Brisbane, Queensland.

She was raised in Port Macquarie, where she began performing at the age of 15, and left high school to focus on her music career.

== Personal life ==
Kita Alexander's elder sister, Natassja Alexander, died in July 2013. She dedicated her 2017 Hotel EP to her sister's memory, saying: "It's heavily influenced and deeply personal. "Hotel" is about dealing with the loss."

She married Australian professional surfer Owen Wright in 2019. Close friend and fellow musician Jack River was a member of the bridal party, alongside Lisa Mitchell and Isabel Lucas.

Alexander and Wright's first child, Vali, was born in 2016. Their second child, Rumi Alexander Wright, was born on 15 January 2021. The family live in Lennox Head, also spending time at their second home Paradiso Property, in Byron Bay, where Alexander wrote music for EP, The One.

== Career ==
=== 2013–2014: Lion Hat ===
Her first extended play, Lion Hat, with six tracks, was issued in March 2013. It was produced by Jordan Millar and recorded in Sydney. Lisa Tisdell of Port Macquarie News felt, "the finished product containing songs that appeal to a cross-section of people." She moved to Byron Bay, after turning 18.

Alexander found her talent manager, Tim Manton (of After the Fall) of TAP Management, via a Google search.

=== 2015–2016: Like You Want To ===
Alexander released her debut single "My Own Way" in August 2015. "My Own Way" received airplay on national youth radio station Triple J, and peaked at #95 on the ARIA Singles Chart. AllMusic's Neil Z. Yeung observed that, "[her influences] informed much of her sonic aesthetic, while polished production sheen enhanced her pop sensibilities." Alexander had travelled to the west coast of United States earlier that year to record an acoustic music video for "My Own Way" at Noisey Acoustics in Topanga Canyon. "My Own Way" polled at #125 in Triple J's Hottest 200 of 2015.

The singer's second EP, Like You Want To was released in November 2015. The EP was rated by AllMusic's Neil Yeung at three-and-a-half stars out-of five, which he described as, "a fun and carefree quartet of atmospheric pop... a promising start for the young singer, whose sunburned throwback pop displays a maturity well beyond her years." The title single was issued earlier in that month, which peaked at #82 on the ARIA Singles Chart. "Like You Want To" ranked at number 107 in Triple J's Hottest 200 of 2015 and was then certified Gold by ARIA in 2020.

=== 2017–2018: Hotel ===
Alexander's third EP, Hotel, was released in April 2017. The title single peaked in the top 60 on the ARIA Singles Chart in November after charting in the related ARIA Hitseekers Singles Chart for over 20 weeks. It was certified platinum, for shipment of 70,000 units, by Australian Recording Industry Association (ARIA) in February 2018 and 2× platinum in 2020.

"Hotel" came in at #196 in Triple J's Hottest 200 of 2017.

=== 2019–2021: "Between You & I" and "Against the Water" ===
In May 2019, Alexander released "Between You & I", which samples Tears for Fears' 1985 song Everybody Wants to Rule the World. "Between You & I" polled at #179 in Triple J's Hottest 200 of 2019 and was certified Gold in 2020.

In February 2020, Alexander released "Against the Water". The song references her partner Owen Wright's brain injury (which occurred while surfing competitively Pipeline on the North Shore of Hawaii) and Alexander's subsequent withdrawal from touring in order to nurse him back to health.

=== 2022: The One ===
On 11 March 2022, Alexander released "Run" in which she disavows an unhealthy relationship and sings of finding the courage to break free and is the first taste of a forthcoming EP, due in 2022.

On 19 August 2022, Alexander released "Ocean Blue".

On 4 November 2022, Alexander released "Memories of You", the fourth single from her fourth EP, The One, scheduled for related on 17 November 2022. "Memories of You" reckons with trauma of sexual abuse to which Alexander says, "I hope that the men who listen to this song will digest it's [sic] true meaning and have it in the back of their heads, on repeat, always".

=== 2023–2024: Young in Love ===
In March 2023, Alexander announced details of her debut headline tour in Australia and released "Queen".

In November 2023, Alexander released "Best You Ever Had" and announced her debut album Young in Love, which was released in March 2024.

=== 2025–present: Rage ===
In February 2026, Alexander announced her second album Rage would be released on 26 June 2026.

== Discography ==
=== Studio albums ===
List of albums released, with year released and label details shown
| Title | Details | Peak chart positions |
| Title | Details | AUS |
|---|---|---|
| Young in Love | Released: 22 March 2024; Label: Warner Music Australia (5419784192); Formats: LP, digital download, streaming | 61 |
| Rage | Released: 26 June 2026; Label: Warner Music (2685472335); Formats: LP, digital download, streaming | 11 |

=== Extended plays ===
List of EPs released, with year released and label details shown
| Title | Details |
|---|---|
| Lion Hat | Released: 29 March 2013; Label: Self-released; Formats: Digital download, streaming |
| Like You Want To | Released: 27 November 2015; Label: Warner Music Australia (5419690082); Formats: Digital download, streaming |
| Hotel | Released: 7 April 2017; Label: Warner Music Australia; Formats: Digital download, streaming |
| The One | Released: 17 November 2022; Label: Warner Music Australia; Formats: Digital download, streaming |

=== Singles ===
List of singles, with year released, selected chart positions and certifications, and album name shown
| Title | Year | Peak chart positions | | Certifications | Album |
| Title | Year | AUS | NZ Hot | Certifications | Album |
|---|---|---|---|---|---|
| "My Own Way" | 2015 | 95 | — | | Non-album single |
| "Like You Want To" | 2015 | 82 | — | ARIA: Gold | Like You Want To |
| "Damage Done" | 2016 | — | — | ARIA: Gold | Hotel |
| "Hotel" | 2017 | 51 | — | ARIA: 2× Platinum; RMNZ: Gold | Hotel |
| "Between You & I" | 2019 | — | — | ARIA: Gold; RMNZ: Gold | Non-album singles |
| "Against the Water" | 2020 | — | — | | Non-album singles |
| "I Miss You, I'm Sorry" | 2020 | — | — | | Non-album singles |
| "Can't Help Myself" | 2020 | — | — | | Non-album singles |
| "Run" | 2022 | — | — | | The One |
| "Storm" | 2022 | — | — | | The One |
| "Ocean Blue" | 2022 | — | — | | The One |
| "Memories of You" | 2022 | — | — | | The One |
| "Queen" | 2023 | — | — | | Young in Love |
| "7 Minutes in Heaven" | 2023 | — | — | | Young in Love |
| "Date Night" (featuring Morgan Evans) | 2023 | — | 32 | | Young in Love |
| "Atmosphere" (with Fisher) | 2023 | 68 | 10 | ARIA: 2× Platinum; RMNZ: Platinum | TBA |
| "Best You Ever Had" | 2023 | — | — | | Young in Love |
| "All Night" (featuring Laurel) | 2024 | — | — | | Young in Love |
| "Zodiac" | 2024 | — | — | | Young in Love |
| "True" (with Cyril) | 2024 | 94 | 28 | | From Down Under |
| "Press Pause" | 2025 | — | — | | Non-album single |
| "I Don't Wanna Go Home" | 2025 | — | — | | Non-album single |
| "Around U" (with Peking Duk and Drax Project) | 2025 | — | 23 | | TBA |
| "Bluray" | 2025 | — | — | | TBA |
| "Rage" | 2026 | — | — | | Rage |
| "The Good House" | 2026 | — | — | | Rage |
| "Tell My Friends" (featuring Christoper) | 2026 | — | — | | Rage |
| "Sentimental Letter" | 2026 | — | — | | Rage |
| "Worth It" | 2026 | — | — | | Rage |
| "Back to Sydney" | 2026 | — | — | | |

== Awards and nominations ==
=== AIR Awards ===
The Australian Independent Record Awards (commonly known informally as AIR Awards) is an annual awards night to recognise, promote and celebrate the success of Australia's Independent Music sector.

| Year | Nominee / work | Award | Result | Ref. |
|---|---|---|---|---|
| 2024 | "Atmosphere" (with Fisher) | Best Independent Dance, Electronica or Club Single | Won | |

=== APRA Music Awards ===
The APRA Music Awards were established by Australasian Performing Right Association (APRA) in 1982 to honour the achievements of songwriters and music composers, and to recognise their song writing skills, sales and airplay performance, by its members annually.

| Year | Nominee / work | Award | Result | Ref. |
|---|---|---|---|---|
| 2025 | "Atmosphere" with Fisher (Kita Alexander, Konstantin Kersting, Thoman Earnshaw,, Dominik Felsmann, Paul Fisher) | Most Performed Dance/Electronic Work | Nominated | |
| 2026 | "Press Pause" (Nikkita Wright, Annie Schindel, Kyle Shearer) | Most Performed Pop Work | Nominated | |

=== ARIA Music Awards ===
The ARIA Music Awards are a set of annual ceremonies presented by Australian Recording Industry Association (ARIA), which recognise excellence, innovation, and achievement across all genres of the music of Australia. They commenced in 1987.

| Year | Nominee / work | Award | Result | Ref. |
|---|---|---|---|---|
| 2024 | Young in Love | Michael Gudinski Breakthrough Artist. | Nominated | |
| 2024 | "Atmosphere" with Fisher | Best Dance/Electronic Release | Nominated | |
| 2024 | "Atmosphere" with Fisher | Song of the Year | Nominated | |
| 2024 | Fisher for "Atmosphere" by Fisher and Kita Alexander | Best Produced Release | Nominated | |
| 2025 | "Press Pause" | Best Pop Release | Nominated | |
| 2025 | Kita Alexander – Tourism and Events Queensland: That Holiday Feeling (Publicis Worldwide) | Best Use of an Australian Recording in an Advertisement | Nominated | |

=== Electronic Dance Music Awards ===
The Electronic Dance Music Awards are presented by iHeart Radio and commenced in 2022.

| Year | Nominee / work | Award | Result | Ref. |
|---|---|---|---|---|
| 2024 | "Atmosphere" (with Fisher) | Dance Song of the Year | Nominated | |

=== Queensland Music Awards ===
The Queensland Music Awards (previously known as Q Song Awards) are annual awards celebrating Queensland, Australia's brightest emerging artists and established legends. They commenced in 2006.

| Year | Nominee / work | Award | Result (wins only) | Ref. |
|---|---|---|---|---|
| 2024 | "Atmosphere" with Fisher | Highest Selling Single | Won | |

=== Rolling Stone Australia Awards ===
The Rolling Stone Australia Awards are awarded annually by the Australian edition of Rolling Stone magazine for outstanding contributions to popular culture in the previous year.

| Year | Nominee / work | Award | Result | Ref. |
|---|---|---|---|---|
| 2024 | "Atmosphere" with Fisher | Best Single | Nominated | |
