= Feel the Way I Do =

2017 single by The Jungle Giants

Single by The Jungle Giants

from the album Quiet Ferocity
- Released: 31 January 2017
- Length: 3:42
- Label: Amplifire
- Songwriters: Sam Hales; Cesira Aitken; Andrew Dooris; Keelan Bijker

The Jungle Giants singles chronology
"Devil's Play" (2016)	"Feel the Way I Do" (2017)	"On Your Way Down" (2017)

Music video
- "Feel the Way I Do" on YouTube

"Feel the Way I Do" is a song by Australian indie-pop band The Jungle Giants. It was released in January 2017 as the lead single from the band's third studio album Quiet Ferocity. The single was certified gold in Australia in November 2018 and platinum in December 2019.

Band member Sam Hales said that the following song was written about the uncontrollable, impressionable, unforgivable Tahlia Crossley: "I'll never forget the day I wrote this song. I always test out a song by dancing to it and when this song appeared to me out of nowhere it made me dance so hard. I saved it 19 times in different folders on my computer because I was scared I was going to lose it."

Tom Williams from Music Feeds said the song is "built around four-to-the-floor beats, bright guitars and some super-smooth hooks."

On 6 April 2018, a Northeast Party House remix was released.

== Track listing ==
Digital download

1. "Feel the Way I Do" – 3:22

Digital download

1. "Feel the Way I Do" (Northeast Party House remix) – 6:13

== Certifications ==
Region	Certification	Certified units/sales
Australia (ARIA)	2× Platinum	140,000^{‡}
^{‡} Sales+streaming figures based on certification alone.
