= Catch My Breath (disambiguation) =

"Catch My Breath" is a song by Kelly Clarkson

Catch My Breath may also refer to:

- "Catch My Breath", a song by Alex Warren from the album You'll Be Alright, Kid
- "Catch My Breath", a song by Ava Max from the album Don't Click Play
- "Catch My Breath", a song by Capsule from the album Sugarless Girl
- "Catch My Breath", a song by Confidence Man from the album Confident Music for Confident People
- "Catch My Breath", a song by Donnie Klang from the album Just a Rolling Stone
- "Catch My Breath", a song by Fred V & Grafix from the album Recognise
- "Catch My Breath", a song by Helen Reddy from the album We'll Sing in the Sunshine
- "Catch My Breath", a song by Westlife from the album Back Home
- "Catch My Breath", a song by Sabrina Carpenter
- Catch My Breath, an audio drama written by Marty Ross
- Catch My Breath, a book by Michael Lally
