= Thornhill (band) =

Australian metal band

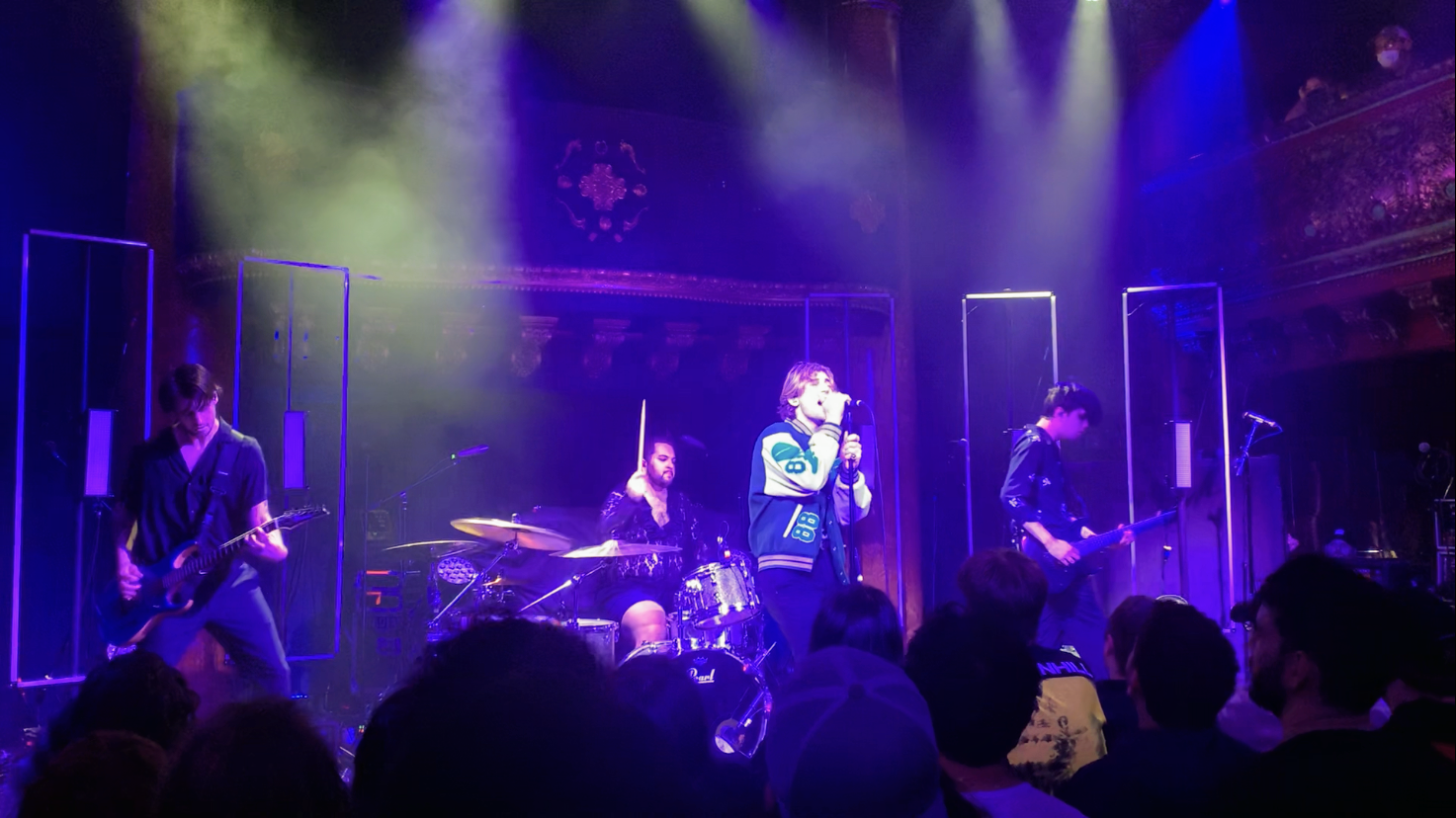
- Thornhill in 2022

Background information
- Origin: Melbourne, Victoria, Australia
- Genres: Alternative metal; metalcore; nu metalcore
- Years active: 2015–present
- Label: UNFD
- Members: Jacob Charlton; Ethan McCann; Nick Sjogren; Ben Maida
- Past members: Sam Anderson; Matt Van Duppen
- Website: unfdcentral.com/artists/thornhill

Thornhill are an Australian heavy metal band from Melbourne, formed in 2015. Their style is primarily described as alternative metal and metalcore. The band currently consists of vocalist Jacob Charlton, guitarist Ethan McCann, drummer Ben Maida, and bass guitarist Nick Sjogren. Thornhill have released three studio albums: The Dark Pool (2019), Heroine (2022) and Bodies (2025), and two EPs: 13 (2016) and Butterfly (2018).

== History ==
=== Foundation and early years (2015–2017) ===
The band had its initial beginnings in 2015 when Jacob Charlton, Ben Maida, Sam Anderson and Ethan McCann began performing in Battle of the Bands competitions whilst at high-school at Vermont Secondary College in outer suburban Melbourne.

The band's first formal release occurred in 2016 with debut single "XY" on 2 June 2016, featuring Void of Vision's Jack Bergin. Soon after in August 2016, Thornhill released their debut EP, 13, before going on to produce the self-released single "Temperer" in May 2017.

After a critical reception to 13 and "Temperer", the band toured as support acts for several Australian local metal bands including Void of Vision and Hellions. In 2017 the band won a Triple J Unearthed competition to support the British band Architects as part of their 2017 tour of Australia. The publicity following this, as well as ongoing airtime on Triple J radio, including on the 'Home and Hosed' segment, saw the band go on to support Alpha Wolf, The Brave, Graves and, one of the band's early influences, Northlane in 2017. The band released of the single "Limbo" on 15 August 2017. Thornhill finished 2017 as Triple J's weekly feature artist in November.

During late 2017 guitarist, Sam Anderson, left the band and was replaced by Matt van Duppen, who at the time was also guitarist for heavy-act Better Half.

=== Signing with UNFD and Butterfly EP (2018–2019) ===
Thornhill began early 2018 by supporting Australian metalcore heavyweight Parkway Drive at the Forum Theatre in Melbourne before going on to again support the Architects in Adelaide. Around this time the band revealed that it had signed a record deal with UNFD, an independent record label based in Melbourne, Australia and home to a number of Australian rock and metal artists.

On 16 February 2018 the band released its second EP titled Butterfly, now under the UNFD label. The band's first ever headline show premiering Butterfly live followed on 7 April at the Melbourne venue, Cherry Bar, to a sold-out crowd.

Thornhill embarked on a series of shows throughout 2018 and early 2019, supporting bands for Australian tours including Ocean Grove, Make Them Suffer and In Hearts Wake. The band's year of heavy touring culminated in a feature at Unify Festival 2019, a multi-day rock and heavy based music festival held in January in Gippsland, Victoria, Australia.

The band released the single "Coven" on 4 April 2019 followed by The Coven Australian Tour.

=== The Dark Pool and Heroine (2019–2023) ===
On 25 October 2019, the band released its first studio album The Dark Pool, under the UNFD label. The album debuted on the ARIA Albums Chart at number 20 and featured a complement of music videos showcasing the album's doomsday and spiritualistic themes. The Dark Pool gained widespread attention leading to publicity with rock and heavy-metal focused journals and news sites. The band had its first headline Australian tour in November 2019, visiting Melbourne, Sydney, Brisbane and Adelaide, debuting The Dark Pool live at 'Stay Gold' in Melbourne. The album gained Thornhill a nomination for "Best International Breakthrough Band" at the '2020 Heavy Music Awards' by Amazon Music UK. The Dark Pool was selected by Triple J as the station's 'Feature Album' for the first week of December 2019

In November, the band headlined 'Misery: Emo Boat Party', a nautical-inspired gig held on board The Lady Cutler, a cruising boat departing Melbourne on which the members of the band dressed up in old seamen style outfits.

The band announced its first international tour, touring Europe in January 2020 with Ded as supports for Wage War. The band played shows across the UK, Netherlands, Germany and Belgium. Immediately following this tour the band announced plans for a second international tour in 2020. This was cancelled due to border restrictions following the COVID-19 epidemic. The band announced plans in late 2020 for another international Europe and UK tour for late 2021 with August Burns Red, Bury Tomorrow and Miss May I.

Thornhill played at Download Festival 2020 Melbourne and Sydney in March 2020, their last show before the COVID-19 pandemic.

On 5 April 2020 a glitch in Triple J Darwin's broadcast system saw Thornhill make headlines when track "Lily and the Moon" was accidentally played on public radio on-loop for nearly four hours from approximately 4:30 to 8:30 am.

Despite not touring during most of 2020, Thornhill released an instrumental edition of The Dark Pool on 1 May 2020, and an isolated vocals edition of The Dark Pool on 29 May 2020.

On 5 February 2021 the band's lead singer, Jacob Charlton, featured on the single "Year of the Rat" (featuring Jacob Charlton) by Void of Vision, a rework of the band's original song from their 2019 album Hyperdaze.

The band was able to recommence live shows in March 2021 and began by touring Queensland, Australia. The band was caught in the middle of a COVID-19 outbreak in Brisbane at the time and was forced to return to Melbourne to quarantine, requiring the rescheduling of the rest of their tour planned for the Australian East Coast

Thornhill released the single "Casanova" on 28 October 2021, premiering on Triple J. "Casanova" showed the band combining metalcore with dance and pop elements.

On 24 January 2022, the band released the single "Arkangel", followed by single "Hollywood" on 7 March 2022, and "Raw" on 23 May 2022.

Thornhill released its second studio album Heroine on 3 June 2022.

On 16 September 2022, the band announced the cancellation of their upcoming October/November tour with August Burns Red, Bury Tomorrow, and Miss May I, citing feeling "mentally burnt out" recently, being "forced to consider the longevity of the band" in order to "recharge and be ready to go again in 2023". The band also announced the departure of guitarist Matt "MVD" van Duppen.

On 24 January 2023, the band revealed that their rehearsal space had been broken into and that $100,000 worth of personal belongings and musical equipment had been stolen. They later launched a GoFundMe to replace said equipment.

On 10 October 2023, the band released a new single titled "Viper Room".

=== Bodies (2024–present) ===
On 29 February 2024, the band released a new single titled "Obsession", and on 21 November 2024, the band released another single titled "Nerv".

On 30 January 2025, the group announced their third studio album, Bodies, scheduled for release on 4 April 2025. The announcement was accompanied by the single "Silver Swarm". On 11 April 2025, Thornhill embarked on their North American headline tour.

Later that year, Thornhill announced they were dropping out of a North American tour headlined by LANDMVRKS, citing an "unexpected [touring] opportunity" as the reason. They were replaced by NOVELISTS. Shortly afterwards, Thornhill were announced as tour support for Sleep Token's Even in Arcadia North America tour.

Before the tour began, Thornhill released a new single titled "Mercia" along with a cinematic music video. This single was later revealed to be from Bodies X, a remix album of Bodies releasing on 7 November, featuring artists such as vianova, Northlane, Zetra, and Landon Tewers of The Plot In You. The band described the album as "a remix record where each track is reimagined by one of our friends or creatives that we admire."

== Musical style and influences ==
The band's music has described as alternative metal, metalcore, "alternative metalcore", nu metalcore and progressive metalcore. Influences include bands and artists such as Deftones, Nine Inch Nails, My Ticket Home, Ocean Grove, Radiohead, Red Hot Chili Peppers, Queens of the Stone Age, Justin Timberlake, Black Eyed Peas, Crooks, Jeff Buckley, Metallica, the Smashing Pumpkins, Jordan Rakei, Thrice, Arcane Roots, Structures, Karnivool, Northlane, Bring Me the Horizon, Gorillaz, Joey Valence & Brae, Elvis Presley, Gwen Stefani and Silverchair.

== Members ==
Current

- Jacob Charlton – vocals (2016–present), guitar (2023–present)
- Ethan McCann – guitar (2016–present)
- Ben Maida – drums (2016–present)
- Nick Sjogren – bass guitar, synth (2016–present)

Former

- Sam Anderson – guitar (2016–2017)
- Matt van Duppen – guitar (2017–2022; guest performer 2025)

Timeline

== Discography ==
=== Studio albums ===
List of studio albums
Title	Details	Peak chart positions	
Title	Details	AUS	UK Down.
The Dark Pool	Released: 25 October 2019; Label: UNFD (UNFD118); Format: CD, cassette, LP, streaming	20	—
Heroine	Released: 3 June 2022; Label: UNFD (UNFD150); Format: CD, LP, streaming	3	—
Bodies	Released: 4 April 2025; Label: UNFD (UNFD199); Format: CD, LP, streaming	4	48

=== Live albums ===
List of live albums
Title	Details
Live on Tour!	Released: 21 June 2024; Label: UNFD (UNFD196); Format: LP, streaming; Tracklisting: 1. Arkangel (Live in Seattle, US); 2. All the Light We Don't See (Live in Melbourne, Australia); 3. Lilly & the Moon (Live in Melbourne, Australia); 4. Casanova (Live in New York, US); 5. Coven (Live in Manchester, UK); 6. Hollywood (Live in Cardiff, UK); 7. Leather Wings (Live in Chicago, US); 8. Obsession (Live in Perth, Australia); 9. Raw (Live in Cincinnati, US); 10. The Haze (Live in Melbourne, Australia); 11. Red Summer (Live in Melbourne, Australia) (feat. Lucas Woodland of Holding Absence); 12. The Hellfire Club (Live in Cologne, Germany); 13. Views from the Sun (Live in Atlanta, US); 14. Viper Room (Live in Sydney, Australia); 15. Where We Go When We Die (Live in Newcastle, UK)

=== Extended plays ===
List of extended plays
Title	Details	Peak chart positions
Title	Details	AUS
13	Released: 14 August 2016; Label: Thornhill; Tracklisting: 1. Days; 2. Outcast; 3. Tunnel Vision; 4. Patterns; 5. XY (feat. Jack Bergin of Void of Vision)	—
Butterfly	Released: 16 February 2018; Label: UNFD (UNFD105); Format: LP, streaming; Tracklisting: 1. Sunflower; 2. Parasite; 3. Reptile; 4. My Design; 5. Lavender; 6. Joy	52

== Awards and nominations ==
=== AIR Awards ===
The Australian Independent Record Awards (commonly known informally as AIR Awards) is an annual awards night to recognise, promote and celebrate the success of Australia's Independent Music sector.

Year	Nominee / work	Award	Result	Ref.
2023	Heroine	Best Independent Heavy Album or EP	Nominated	
2026	Bodies	Best Independent Heavy Album or EP	Won	

=== APRA Music Awards ===
The APRA Music Awards were established by Australasian Performing Right Association (APRA) in 1982 to honour the achievements of songwriters and music composers, and to recognise their song writing skills, sales and airplay performance, by its members annually.

Year	Nominee / work	Award	Result	Ref.
2026	"Nerv"	Most Performed Hard Rock / Heavy Metal Work	Nominated	

=== ARIA Music Awards ===
The ARIA Music Awards are a set of annual ceremonies presented by Australian Recording Industry Association (ARIA), which recognise excellence, innovation, and achievement across all genres of the music of Australia. They commenced in 1987.

Year	Nominee / work	Award	Result	Ref.
2022	Heroine	Best Hard Rock/Heavy Metal Album	Nominated	
2025	Bodies	Best Hard Rock/Heavy Metal Album	Won	

=== Heavy Music Awards ===
Launched in 2017, the Heavy Music Awards issues awards for best of the year across the heavy music landscape including artists, events, photographers, designers, producers and more. With a panel of several hundred industry insiders nominating the finalists, the public vote to determine the winners.

Year	Nominee / work	Award	Result
2020	Thornhill	Best International Breakthrough Band	Nominated

=== J Awards ===
The J Awards are an annual series of Australian music awards that were established by the Australian Broadcasting Corporation's youth-focused radio station Triple J. They commenced in 2005.

Year	Nominee / work	Award	Result	Ref.
2025	Bodies	Australian Album of the Year	Nominated	
