= 2025 ARIA Music Awards =

Edition of Australian music awards

- Date: 19 November 2025
- Venue: Hordern Pavilion, Sydney, New South Wales
- Hosted by: Tim Blackwell, Concetta Caristo

Highlights
- Most wins: Amyl and the Sniffers (4)
- Most nominations: Ninajirachi (8)
- Website: ariaawards.com.au

Television/radio coverage
- Networks
- Network 10 and Paramount+

The 2025 ARIA Music Awards were the 39th annual Australian Recording Industry Association music awards ceremony (generally known as ARIA Music Awards or simply the ARIAs). The ARIA Awards ceremony was held on 19 November 2025, broadcast on Network 10 and live-streamed via YouTube and Paramount+ from Hordern Pavilion, Sydney.

Category nominations were announced on 25 September 2025. At the same time You Am I were also named as ARIA Hall of Fame inductees and were subsequently installed in November.

== ARIA Hall of Fame inductee ==
The ARIA Hall of Fame inductees for 2025 were Australian rock band You Am I.

== ARIA Global Impact Award ==
- Dom Dolla

== Nominees and winners ==
Nominations were announced on 25 September 2025 via ARIA's YouTube channel, hosted by Georgie Tunny.

=== ARIA Awards ===
Full list of nominees
Album of the Year	Best Solo Artist
Amyl and the Sniffers – Cartoon Darkness; Missy Higgins – The Second Act; Ninajirachi – I Love My Computer; Rüfüs Du Sol – Inhale / Exhale; Thelma Plum – I'm Sorry, Now Say It Back	Ninajirachi – I Love My Computer; Barkaa – Big Tidda; Dom Dolla featuring Daya – "Dreamin'"; Kylie Minogue – Tension II; Mallrat – Light Hit My Face Like a Straight Right; Missy Higgins – The Second Act; Paul Kelly – Fever Longing Still; The Kid Laroi – "How Does It Feel?"; Thelma Plum – I'm Sorry, Now Say It Back; Young Franco – It's Franky Baby!
Best Group	Michael Gudinski Breakthrough Artist
Amyl and the Sniffers – Cartoon Darkness; Folk Bitch Trio – Now Would Be a Good Time; Hilltop Hoods – Fall from the Light; Royel Otis – Hickey; Rüfüs Du Sol – Inhale / Exhale	Ninajirachi – I Love My Computer; Folk Bitch Trio – Now Would Be a Good Time; Gut Health – Stiletto; Mia Wray – Hi, It's Nice to Meet Me; Young Franco – It's Franky Baby!
Best Adult Contemporary Album	Best Blues & Roots Album
Missy Higgins – The Second Act; Folk Bitch Trio – Now Would Be a Good Time; Gordi – Like Plasticine; Meg Washington – Gem; Paul Kelly – Fever Longing Still	The Teskey Brothers – Live at The Hammersmith Apollo; Dope Lemon – Golden Wolf; Mama Kin Spender – Promises; Sons of the East – Sons; Tash Sultana – Return to the Roots
Best Children's Album	Best Country Album
Emma Memma – Dance Island Party; Justine Clarke – Mimi's Symphony; Teeny Tiny Stevies – Brain Fart; The Vegetable Plot – Season Three; The Wiggles – Wiggle Up, Giddy Up!	Kasey Chambers – Backbone; Dylan Wright – Half a World Away; Imogen Clark – Choking on Fuel; Keith Urban – High; Taylor Moss – Firecracker
Best Dance/Electronic Release	Best Hard Rock/Heavy Metal Album
Dom Dolla featuring Daya – "Dreamin'"; Confidence Man – 3AM (La La La); Fisher – "Stay"; Ninajirachi – I Love My Computer; Sonny Fodera, Jazzy & D.O.D. – "Somedays"	Thornhill – Bodies; Civic – Chrome Dipped; Press Club – To All The Ones That I Love; RedHook – Mutation; The Amity Affliction – Let the Ocean Take Me Down (Redux)
Best Hip Hop/Rap Release	Best Independent Release
Barkaa – Big Tidda; Hilltop Hoods – Fall from the Light; Miss Kaninna – Kaninna; Onefour – Look at Me Now; The Kid Laroi – "Baby I'm Back"	Ninajirachi – I Love My Computer; Ball Park Music – Like Love; Confidence Man – 3AM (La La La); Folk Bitch Trio – Now Would Be a Good Time; Miss Kaninna – Kaninna
Best Pop Release	Best Rock Album
Thelma Plum – I'm Sorry, Now Say It Back; G Flip – "Disco Cowgirl"; Kita Alexander – "Press Pause"; Kylie Minogue – Tension II; Mallrat – Light Hit My Face Like a Straight Right	Amyl and the Sniffers – Cartoon Darkness; Ball Park Music – Like Love; King Stingray – For the Dreams; Royel Otis – Hickey; Spacey Jane – If That Makes Sense
Best Soul/R&B Release	Best Use of an Australian Recording in an Advertisement
Boy Soda – "Lil' Obsession"; Jacoténe – "Why'd You Do That?"; Jerome Farah – Chlorine; Larissa Lambert – "Cardio"; Pania – "Pity Party"	3% – Fox League 2025: "Our Greats" (Fox Sports Australia); Bliss n Eso – Menulog: What's Good in Your Hood (Thinkerbell); Briggs – Paramount+ Australia: Ballad of the GOATS (Paramount+ Australia); Dune Rats – Tooheys: I Feel Like a Tooheys (Thinkerbell); Kita Alexander – Tourism and Events Queensland: That Holiday Feeling (Publicis Worldwide)
Best Music Festival
Laneway Festival (St. Jerome's Laneway / Laneway Festival); Ability Fest – (Dylan Alcott Foundation and Untitled Group); Beyond the Valley (Untitled Group / Beyond the Valley Music Festival); Bluesfest Byron Bay (Bluesfest Byron Bay); Yours and Owls Festival (Yours and Owls)

=== Public voted ===
Best Video	Song of the Year
Ryan Sauer for Keli Holiday – "Dancing2"; Alexander George (Katzki) for Rüfüs Du Sol – "Break My Love"; Claudia Sangiorgi Dalimore for Missy Higgins – "Craters"; Claudia Sangiorgi Dalimore for Emily Wurramara – "Lordy Lordy"; Dan Lesser for Spacey Jane – "All the Noise"; Jamieson Kerr for Royel Otis – "Car"; John Stewart for Amyl and the Sniffers – "Big Dreams"; Kyle Caulfield and Shevin Dissanayake for Dom Dolla – "Dreamin'"; Roman Anastasios and Jordan Ruyi Blanch for Hilltop Hoods – "Don't Happy, Be Worry"; Utility for VV Pete, Utility and Formation Boyz – "Wassa"	The Kid Laroi – "Girls"; Cyril and Maryjo – "Still Into You"; ~~Dean Lewis – "With You"~~ (Note: In November 2025, Dean Lewis and his management requested to have his nomination for the 2025 ARIA Award for Song of the Year withdrawn following allegations of inappropriate behaviour by Lewis in October 2025. ARIA actioned this request.); Dom Dolla featuring Daya – "Dreamin'"; Fisher – "Stay"; Gotye, Fisher and Chris Lake featuring Kimbra and Sante Sansone – "Somebody"; Onefour and Nemzzz – "Spinnin"; Royel Otis – "Linger" (SiriusXM Session); Sonny Fodera, Jazzy & D.O.D. – "Somedays"; Tobiahs – "Angel of Mine"
Best Australian Live Act	Best International Artist
Troye Sivan – Something to Give Each Other Tour; Amyl and the Sniffers – Cartoon Darkness World Tour; Ball Park Music – Like Love Tour; Barkaa – Big Tidda Tour; Confidence Man – 3AM (La La La) Tour; Dom Dolla – Dom Dolla Australia 2024; Hilltop Hoods – Hilltop Hoods 2025; Kylie Minogue – Tension Tour 2025; Miss Kaninna – Dawg in Me Tour; Speed – Speed Australia Tour '25	Taylor Swift; Alex Warren – You'll Be Alright, Kid; Calvin Harris – 96 Months; Gracie Abrams – The Secret of Us; Kendrick Lamar – GNX; Noah Kahan – Stick Season; Post Malone – F-1 Trillion; Sabrina Carpenter – Short n' Sweet; Tate McRae – So Close to What; Tyler, the Creator – Chromakopia

=== Fine Arts Awards ===
Best Classical Album
- Andrea Lam – Piano Diary
  - Australian Chamber Orchestra and Richard Tognetti – Tchaikovsky: Serenade for Strings and Adante Cantabile / Shostakovich: Chamber Symphony in C Minor
  - Nat Bartsch – Forever Changed
  - Simone Young and Sydney Symphony Orchestra – Mahler: Symphony No. 2 / Barton: Of the Earth
  - Sophie Hutchings – Become the Sky
Best Jazz Album
- Lucy Clifford – Between Spaces of Knowing
  - Evans Robson Quartet – Zenith
  - Lachlan McKenzie – Departures
  - TL;DR and Peter Knight – Too Long; Didn't Read
  - Touch Sensitive – In Paradise
Best World Music Album
- Gurrumul – Banbirrngu - The Orchestral Sessions
  - Electric Fields and Melbourne Symphony Orchestra – Live in Concert
  - Joseph Tawadros – The Forgotten Path to Humanity
  - Tenzin Choegyal – Snow Flower
  - The Cat Empire – Bird in Paradise
Best Original Soundtrack or Musical Theatre Cast Album
- Various Artists – How to Make Gravy
  - Australian Chamber Orchestra – Memoir of a Snail (Original Motion Picture Soundtrack)
  - François Tétaz – The Surfer
  - Michael Cassel Group – Michael Cassel Group Presents a (Very) Musical Christmas
  - Vidya Makan – The Lucky Country (Original Cast Album)

=== Artisan Awards ===
Best Produced Release
- Kevin Parker for Tame Impala – "End of Summer"
  - Alex Burnett for Thelma Plum – I'm Sorry, Now Say It Back
  - Dom Dolla for Dom Dolla – "Dreamin'"
  - Nina Wilson (Ninajirachi) for Ninajirachi – I Love My Computer
  - Rüfüs Du Sol for Rüfüs Du Sol – Inhale / Exhale
Best Engineered Release
- Kevin Parker for Tame Impala – "End of Summer"
  - Alice Ivy for Alice Ivy – Do What Makes You Happy
  - Dom Dolla for Dom Dolla – "Dreamin'"
  - Eric J Dubowsky for Emma Louise and Flume – Dumb
  - Thomas Purcell (Wave Racer) for Ninajirachi – I Love My Computer
Best Cover Art
- John Stewart for Amyl and the Sniffers – Cartoon Darkness
  - Giulia McGauran for The Cat Empire – Bird in Paradise
  - Kira Puru and Em Jensen for Thelma Plum – I'm Sorry, Now Say It Back
  - Nina Wilson, John You and Aria Zarzycki for Ninajirachi – I Love My Computer
  - Sarah McCloskey for Hilltop Hoods – Fall from the Light
