= Heroine (Thornhill album) =

Studio album by Thornhill
- Released: 3 June 2022
- Recorded: 2021–2022
- Genre: Alternative rock; metalcore
- Length: 45:56
- Label: UNFD

Thornhill chronology
The Dark Pool (2019)	Heroine (2022)	Bodies (2025)

Singles from Heroine
- 1. "Casanova" Released: 30 October 2021; 2. "Arkangel" Released: 27 January 2022; 3. "Hollywood" Released: 11 March 2022; 4. "Raw" Released: 25 May 2022

Professional ratings
Review scores
Source	Rating
Boolin Tunes	9.5/10
Rolling Stone	3.5/5

Heroine is the second studio album by Australian alternative rock band Thornhill. It was released on 3 June 2022 through UNFD. It shows the band distancing their metalcore roots that were displayed in their debut album The Dark Pool. It includes several singles including "Casanova" and "Arkangel". This is the final Thornhill album to feature guitarist Matt van Duppen, who left the band in 2023.

== Track listing ==
All tracks are written by Thornhill.

Heroine track listing
No.	Title	Length
1.	"The Hellfire Club"	5:10
2.	"Leather Wings"	3:14
3.	"Blue Velvet"	4:50
4.	"Arkangel"	4:14
5.	"Valentine"	3:13
6.	"Casanova"	3:51
7.	"Something Terrible Came with the Rain"	2:30
8.	"Hollywood"	5:09
9.	"Raw"	3:42
10.	"Varsity Hearts"	4:58
11.	"Heroine"	5:05
Total length:		45:56

== Charts ==
Weekly chart performance for Heroine
Chart (2022)	Peak position
Australian Albums (ARIA)	3
