= Second Act =

Second Act or The Second Act may refer to:

- Second Act (film), a 2018 American romantic comedy film
- Second Act, a 2023 Swedish film directed by Mårten Klingberg
- The Second Act (film), a 2024 French comedy film directed by Quentin Dupieux
- The Second Act (album), an upcoming album by Missy Higgins
- "The Second Act", a 2012 episode of the television sitcom The Middle

== See also ==
- Now You See Me: The Second Act, 2016 American heist film
- Act (drama)
- Story structure, the way a narrative's elements are unified in a particularly chosen order (ordering of the plot)
  - Three-act structure, a model used in narrative fiction that divides a story into three parts (acts)
