= The Dark Pool =

Studio album by Thornhill
- Released: 25 October 2019
- Recorded: 2019
- Genre: Progressive metalcore; djent
- Length: 42:30
- Label: UNFD

Thornhill chronology
The Dark Pool (2019)	Heroine (2022)

Singles from The Dark Pool
- 1. "Coven" Released: 4 April 2019

The Dark Pool is the debut studio album by Australian alternative metal band Thornhill. It was released on 25 October 2019 through UNFD. It has gained widespread attention leading to publicity with rock and heavy-metal focused journals and news sites. The band had its first headline Australian tour in November 2019, visiting Melbourne, Sydney, Brisbane and Adelaide, debuting The Dark Pool live at 'Stay Gold' in Melbourne. The Dark Pool was selected by Triple J as the station's 'Feature Album' for the first week of December 2019.

Punktastic stated in a review, "There's plenty of ingredients here that, with a little more of a thorough mix, could create one hell of a tasty recipe. There's the technical riff work of Northlane, the raw screams of The Devil Wears Prada, the melodic vocal intricacies of Tesseract, the soul-crushing breakdowns of Heart Of A Coward – there is plenty of power here, but not quite enough to really make a lasting impact. They've clearly done their homework and have studied the modern heavy music scene quite intensely, but there's too much borrowing going on and not enough of their own flair. They clearly have the ability to sprinkle a little of their own pizzazz over their music, they perhaps just need to be more generous with their next record."

On 5 April 2020 a glitch in Triple J Darwin's broadcast system saw Thornhill make headlines when track "Lily and the Moon" was accidentally played on public radio on-loop for nearly four hours from approximately 4:30 to 8:30 am. Despite not touring during most of 2020 due to the COVID-19 pandemic, Thornhill released an instrumental edition of The Dark Pool on 1 May 2020, and an isolated vocals edition of The Dark Pool on 29 May 2020.

== Track listing ==
All tracks are written by Thornhill.

The Dark Pool track listing
No.	Title	Length
1.	"Views from the Sun"	4:10
2.	"Nurture"	3:40
3.	"The Haze"	4:11
4.	"Red Summer"	4:24
5.	"In My Skin"	4:06
6.	"All the Light We Don't See"	1:51
7.	"Lily & the Moon"	4:01
8.	"Coven"	3:37
9.	"Human"	4:27
10.	"Netherplace"	2:58
11.	"Where We Go When We Die"	5:05
Total length:		42:30

== Charts ==
Weekly chart performance for The Dark Pool
Chart (2019)	Peak position
Australian Albums (ARIA)	20
