= 2025 J Awards =

21st Annual J Awards

- Official 2025 J Awards promotional image
- Awarded for: The best in Australian music
- Date: 12 November 2025
- Presented by: Various
- Most awards: Ninajirachi (2)
- Most nominations: Amyl and the Sniffers; Ninajirachi; Folk Bitch Trio; Playlunch; (2)
- Website: abc.net.au/triplej/

The 2025 J Awards were the 21st annual J Awards, established by the Australian Broadcasting Corporation's youth-focused radio station Triple J. It awards the best albums, artists, live acts and music videos in the Australian music scene, as determined by the network's teams.

The eligibility period was for releases between 1 November 2024 and 31 October 2025. Nominees were announced on 3 November 2025, and the winners were announced on 12 November 2025.

== Awards ==
=== Australian Album of the Year ===
The winner is selected for its outstanding achievement as an Australian album. Its creativity, musicianship, contribution to Australian music, and audience impact are the main criteria employed by the judging panel in making its decision.

List of Australian Album of the Year nominees
Artist	Album	Result
Baker Boy	Djandjay	Nominated
Folk Bitch Trio	Now Would Be A Good Time	Nominated
Grentperez	Backflips in a Restaurant	Nominated
Mallrat	Light Hit My Face Like a Straight Right	Nominated
Ninajirachi	I Love My Computer	Won
Onefour	Look at Me Now	Nominated
Spacey Jane	If That Makes Sense	Nominated
Tame Impala	Deadbeat	Nominated
The Rions	Everything Every Single Day	Nominated
Thornhill	Bodies	Nominated

=== Australian Live Act of the Year ===
Consideration is given to the consistency, quality and creativity of the act's live shows and impact with audiences.

List of Australian Live Act of the Year nominees
Artist	Result
Amyl and the Sniffers	Nominated
Ball Park Music	Nominated
Miss Kaninna	Nominated
Speed	Won
Xmunashe	Nominated

=== Australian Video of the Year ===
Co-presented with Rage, the winning music video is selected for its creativity, originality, technical excellence and impact on the audience.

List of Australian Video of the Year nominees
Artist	Song	Director	Result
Drifting Clouds	"Bawuypawuy"	Matt Sav	Nominated
Ecca Vandal	"Cruising to Self Soothe"	Ecca Vandal and Richie Buxton	Nominated
Ninajirachi	"Fuck My Computer'"	Ball Bass John	Won
Playlunch	"Keith"	Riley Nimbs	Nominated
Rona	"Show Me"	Tyson Perkins	Nominated

=== Unearthed Artist of the Year ===
Presented by Triple J Unearthed, it goes to an Unearthed artist that has had a stand-out year. The act must have uploaded new music to Unearthed, won a competition through Unearthed in the past 12 months, been an Unearthed Feature artist or played an Unearthed-branded event.

List of Unearthed Artist of the Year nominees
Artist	Result
Don West	Nominated
Darcie Haven	Nominated
Ben Gerrans	Nominated
Folk Bitch Trio	Won
Playlunch	Nominated

=== Double J Artist of the Year ===
Presented by Double J, a sister station of Triple J, the award celebrates an Australian artist who has had a stand-out year for the Double J audience. This can be through releasing new music, contributions to arts and culture in Australia, as well as their live performances throughout the year.

List of Double J Artist of the Year nominees
Artist	Result
Amyl and the Sniffers	Won
Emily Wurramara	Nominated
Gordi	Nominated
Meg Washington	Nominated
Paul Kelly	Nominated
