= Folk Bitch Trio =

Australian musical group

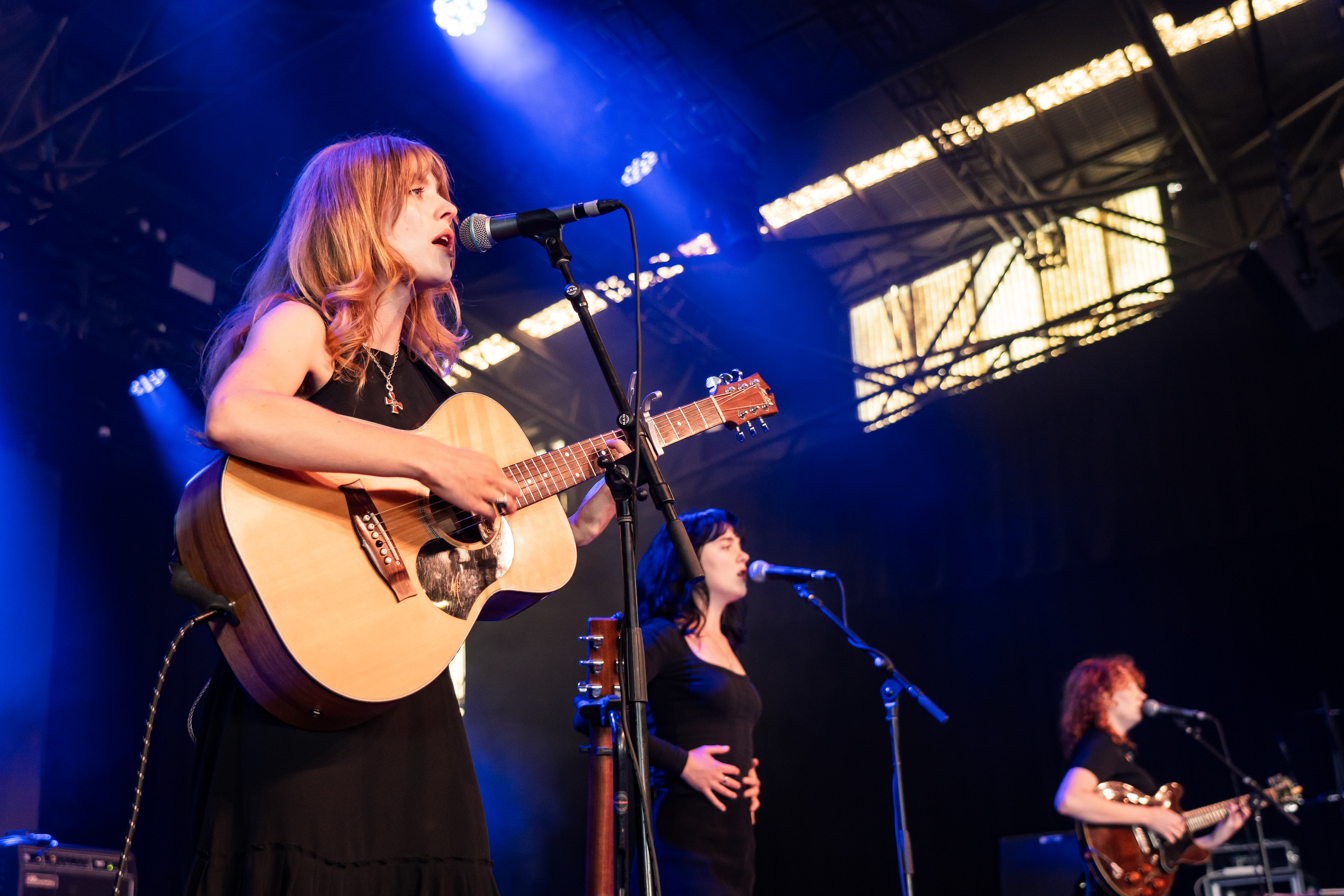

Background information
- Origin: Melbourne, Victoria, Australia
- Genres: Indie folk; indie rock
- Years active: 2020-present
- Label: Jagjaguwar
- Members: Gracie Sinclair; Jeanie Pilkington; Heide Peverelle
- Website: www.folkbitchtrio.com

Folk Bitch Trio is an Australian musical trio. The trio comprises Grace Sinclair, Jeanie Pilkington and Heide Peverelle.

== History ==
The trio began in 2020 in Melbourne. That year, they released their debut single entitled "Houselights". In 2022, the trio released a split with the band Bones and Jones, entitled "Friendly Neighbour/If I Was a Man". In 2023, the trio released two new songs entitled "Analogue" and "I Heard". In 2024, the group released a song entitled "God's a Different Sword". The trio announced they had signed to Jagjaguwar in 2025. Their debut album, Now Would Be a Good Time, was released on 25 July 2025.

== Discography ==
List of albums, with selected details
Title	Details	Peak chart positions	
Title	Details	AUS	NZ
Now Would Be a Good Time	Released: 25 July 2025; Label: Jagjaguwar	19	34

== Awards and nominations ==
=== AIR Awards ===
The Australian Independent Record Awards (commonly known informally as AIR Awards) is an annual awards night to recognise, promote and celebrate the success of Australia's Independent Music sector.

Year	Nominee / work	Award	Result	Ref.
2026	Now Would Be a Good Time	Independent Album of the Year	Nominated	
2026	Now Would Be a Good Time	Best Independent Blues and Roots Album or EP	Won	
2026	Secretly Group for Now Would Be a Good Time	Independent Marketing Team of the Year	Nominated	
2026	Twnty Three for Now Would Be a Good Time	Independent Publicity Team of the Year	Nominated	
2026	Folk Bitch Trio	Breakthrough Independent Artist of the Year	Won	
2026	Bridgette Winton and Folk Bitch Trio for "Cathode Ray"	Independent Music Video of the Year	Won	

=== APRA Music Awards ===
The APRA Music Awards were established by Australasian Performing Right Association (APRA) in 1982 to honour the achievements of songwriters and music composers, and to recognise their song writing skills, sales and airplay performance, by its members annually.

Year	Nominee / work	Award	Result	Ref.
2026	"Cathode Ray" (Heide Peverelle, Jeanie Pilkington, Grace Sinclair)	Song of the Year	Shortlisted	
2026	Heide Peverelle, Jeanie Pilkington & Grace Sinclair (Folk Bitch Trio)	Emerging Songwriter of the Year	Nominated	

=== Australian Music Prize ===
The Australian Music Prize (the AMP) is an annual award of $50,000 given to an Australian band or solo artist in recognition of the merit of an album released during the year of award. It commenced in 2005.

Year	Nominee / work	Award	Result	Ref.
2025	Now Would Be a Good Time	Australian Music Prize	Nominated	

=== ARIA Music Awards ===
The ARIA Music Awards is an annual awards ceremony held by the Australian Recording Industry Association. They commenced in 1987.

Year	Nominee / work	Award	Result	Ref.
2025	Now Would Be a Good Time	Best Group	Nominated	
2025	Now Would Be a Good Time	Michael Gudinski Breakthrough Artist	Nominated	
2025	Now Would Be a Good Time	Best Adult Contemporary Album	Nominated	
2025	Now Would Be a Good Time	Best Independent Release	Nominated	

=== J Awards ===
The J Awards are an annual series of Australian music awards that were established by the Australian Broadcasting Corporation's youth-focused radio station Triple J. They commenced in 2005.

Year	Nominee / work	Award	Result	Ref.
2025	Now Would Be a Good Time	Australian Album of the Year	Nominated	
2025	Themselves	Unearthed Artist of the Year	Won	
