= Civic (band) =

Australian rock band

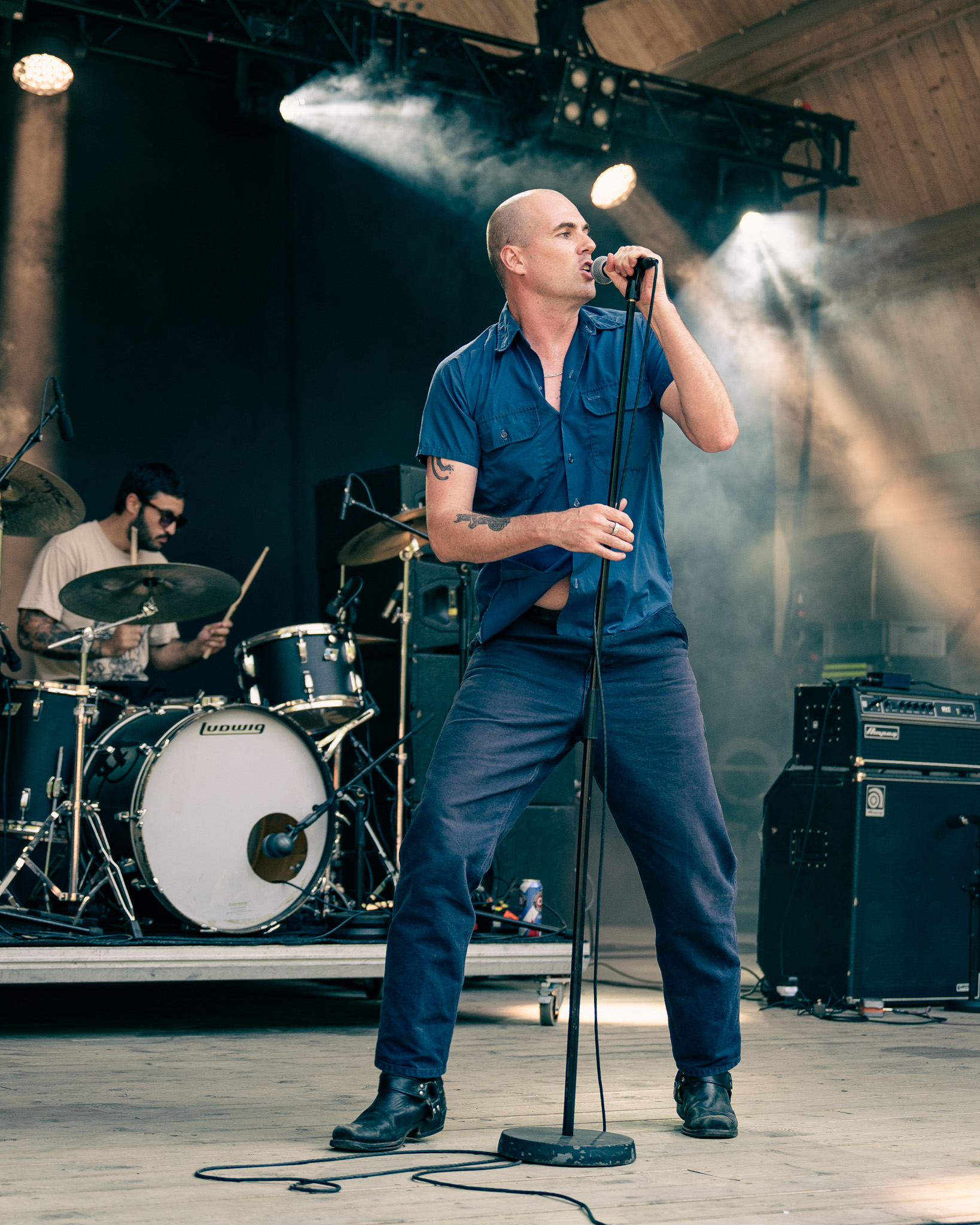
- At Ravnedalen Live in Norway, 2025

Background information
- Origin: Melbourne, Australia
- Genres: Rock, punk rock
- Years active: 2017–present
- Labels: Anti Fade, Flightless, Cooking Vinyl Australia
- Spinoff of: Leather lickers A.D Skinner; Drug Sweat; Pregnancy Scares; Snakes; Whipper; Cuntz
- Members: Jim McCullough; Lewis Hodgson; Roland Hlavka; Eli Sthapit
- Past members: Darcy Grigg; David Forcier; Jackson Harry; Matthew Blach

Civic are an Australian rock band, formed in 2017 in Melbourne. The band consists of Jim McCullough, Lewis Hodgson, Roland Hlavka and Eli Sthapit.

== History ==
The idea for the band formed after Jim McCullough and Darcy Grigg were in a bowling alley in Japan in 2016. In 2017, McCullough and Grigg got together with Roland Hlavka and Lewis Hodgson. Shortly after, David Forcier joined and the band was formed. The band's concept was to "do good rock and roll and not to stuff about with it".

Late in 2017 the band gathered into a small radio studio to perform a hustling live set on radio program Teenage Hate on 3RRR

In April 2018, the band released their debut EP, New Vietnam, which Aine Keogh from Forte Magazine gave 5 out of 5 calling the EP "totally old school rock 'n' roll punk and I don't think they could have done it any better."

In November 2018, the band released their second EP, Those Who No. Andy from Raven Sings the Blues said "Not long after their last crackling EP, Civic returns with a follow-up that hits even harder. Where their debut boiled down porto-punk into its grit and grease components, there's a cleanliness and clarity to Those Who No."

On 26 July 2019, the band released their third EP, Selling. Sucking. Blackmail. Bribes on 7-inch EP.

The band released their debut studio album Future Forecast in March 2021 via Flightless Records which Tom Breihan from Stereogum said "does not disappoint".

In November 2022, Civic released their second studio album Taken by Force on 10 February 2023, with Jackson Harry on guitar and Matthew Blach on drums. It is the band's first release on ATO Records and Cooking Vinyl Australia.

In September 2023, the band released a song and music video, "Hourglass".

Civic released their third studio album, Chrome Dipped, on 30 May 2025, via ATO Records.

== Band members ==
=== Current members ===
- Jim McCullough – lead vocals (2017–present)
- Lewis Hodgson – guitar (2017–present)
- Roland Hlavka – bass (2017–present)
- Eli Sthapit – drums (2023–present)
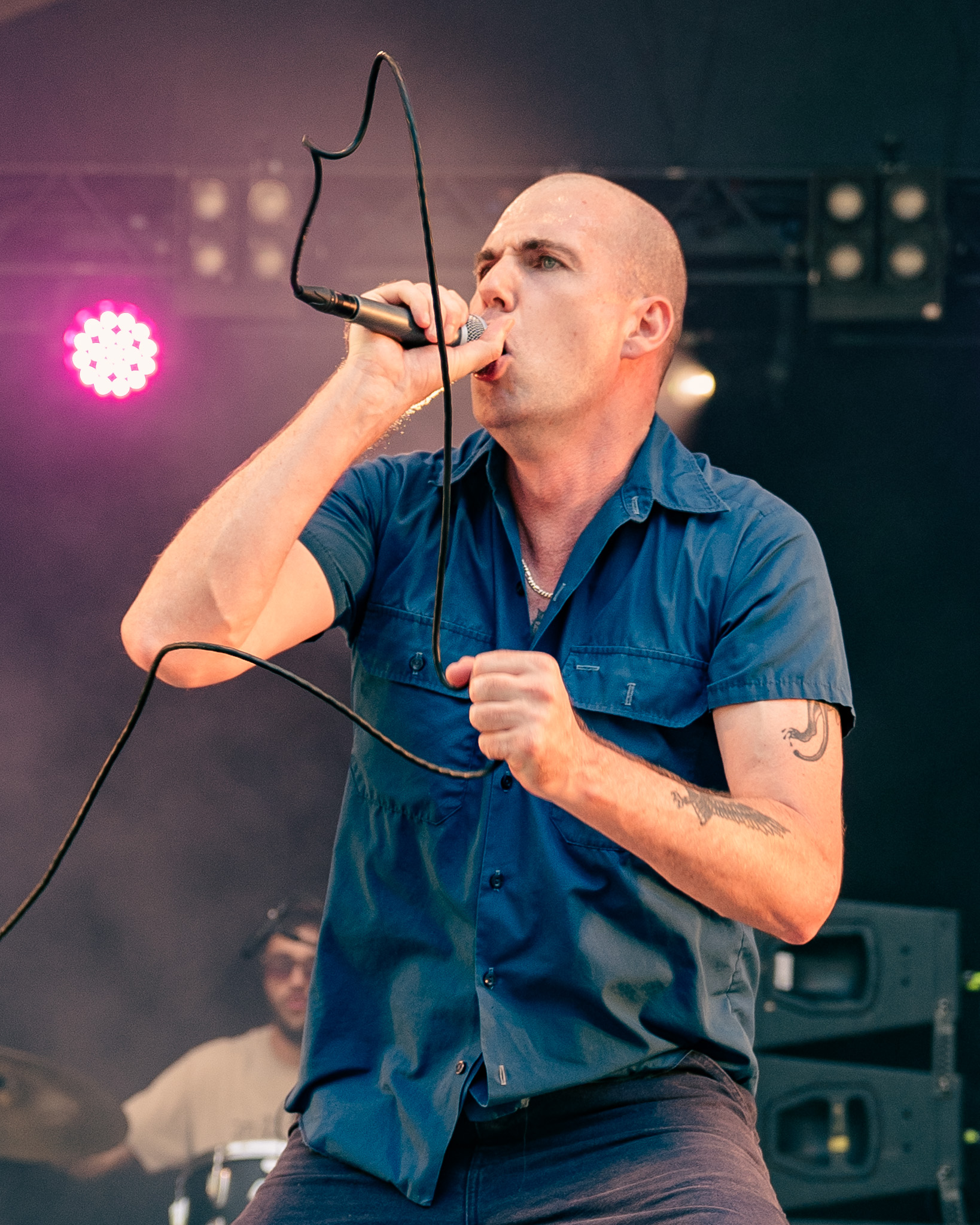
Jim McCullogh

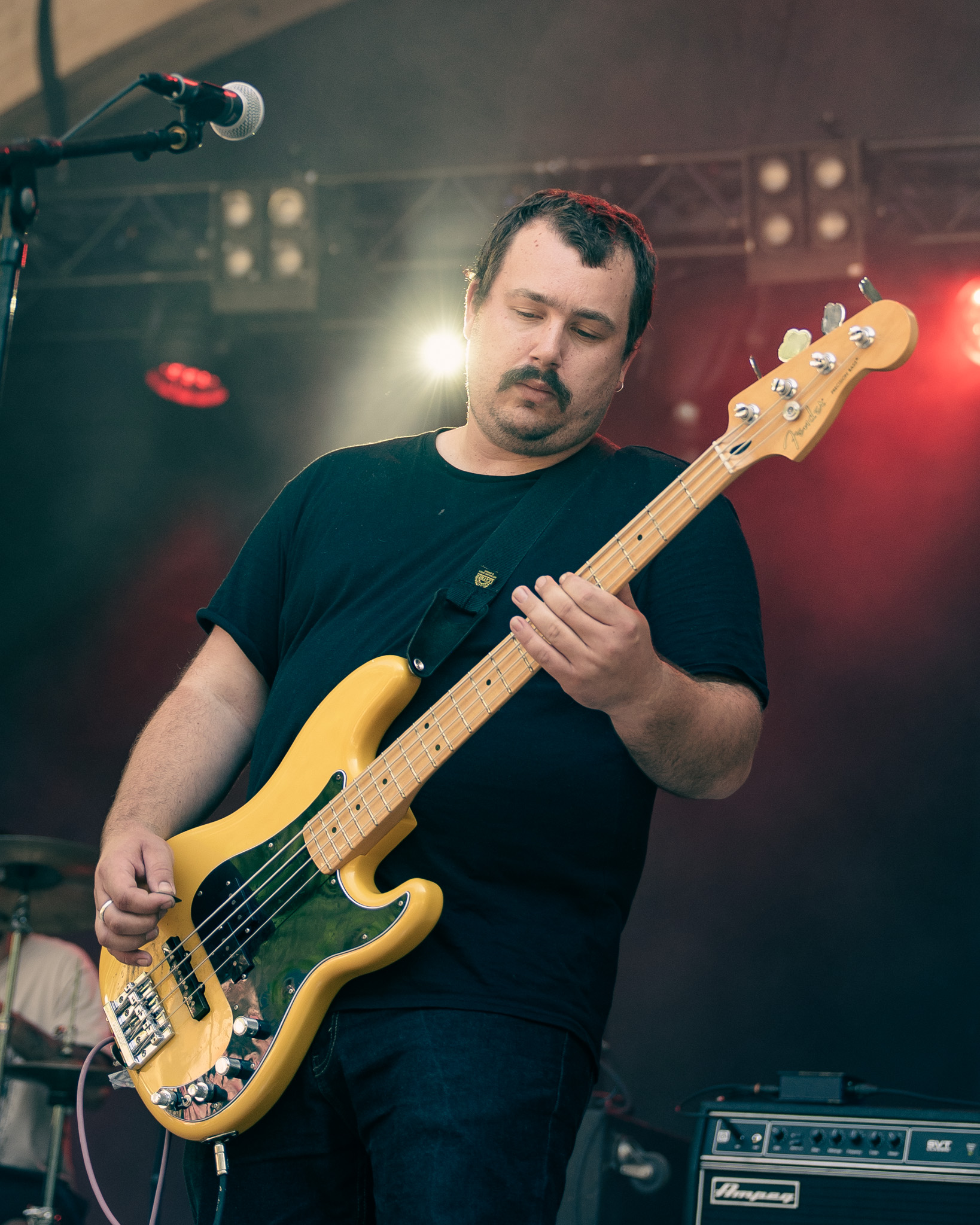
Roland Hlavka

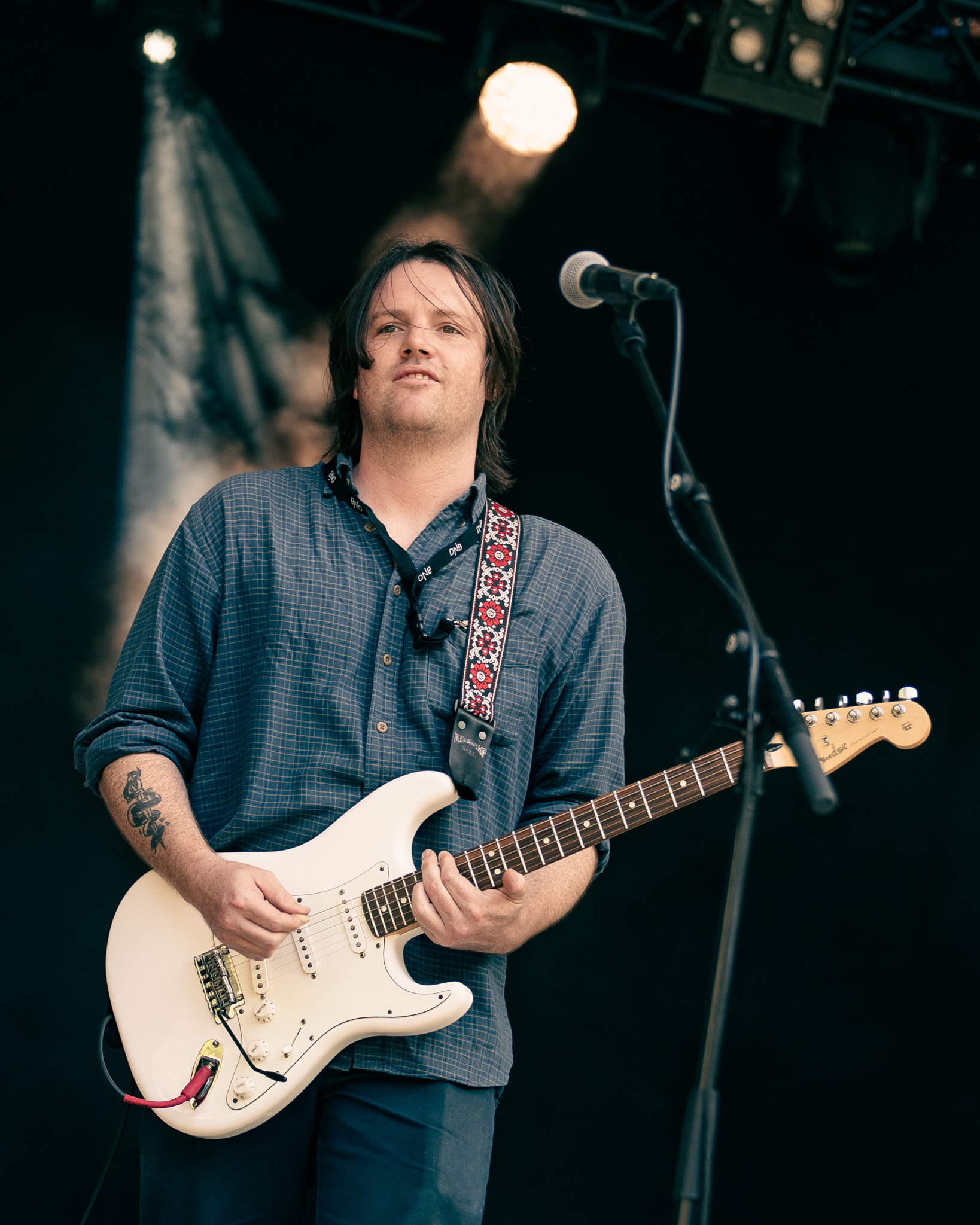
Lewis Hodgson

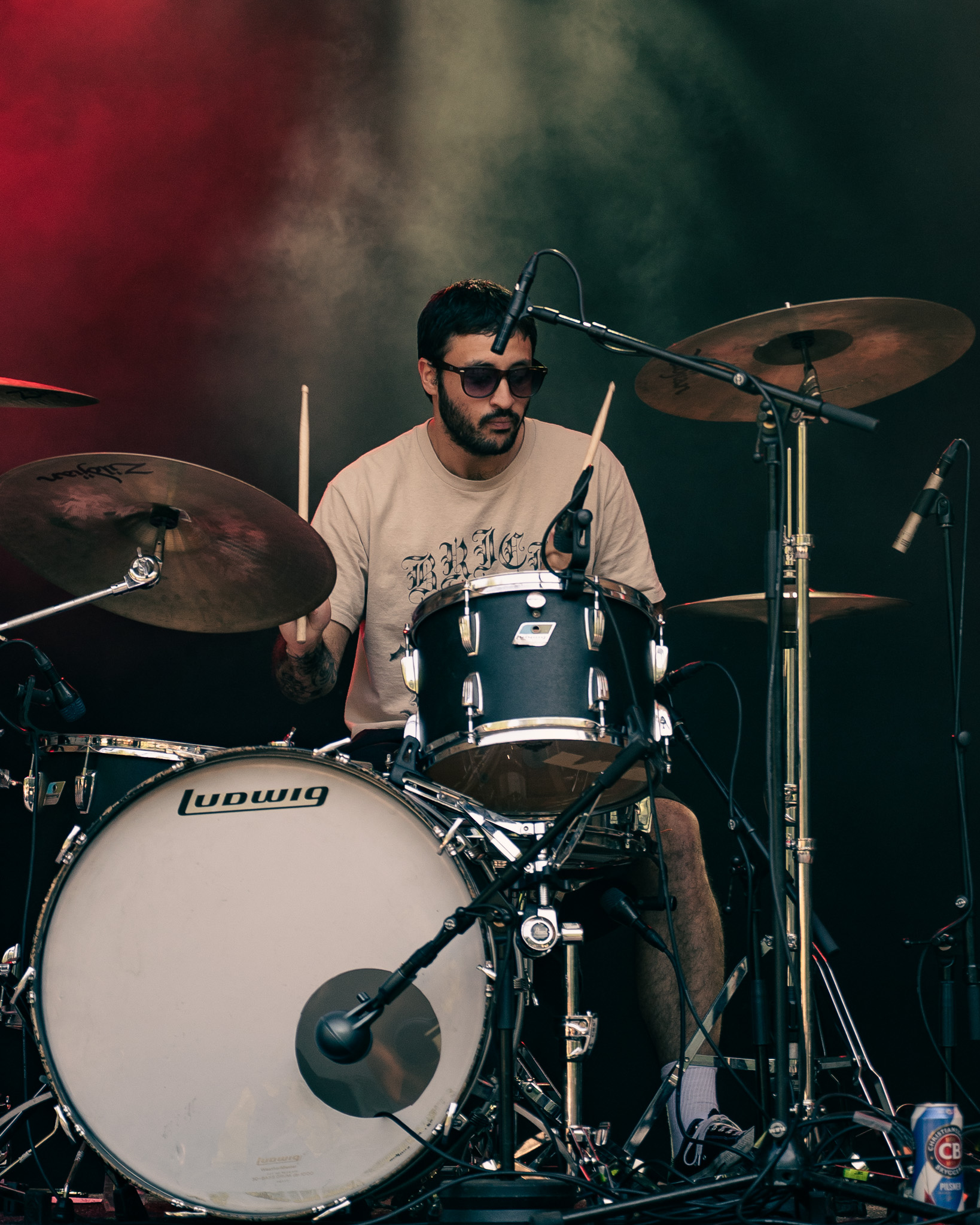
Eli Sthapit

=== Former members ===
- Darcy Grigg – guitar (2017–2022)
- David Forcier – drums (2017–2022)
- Matthew Black – drums (2022–2023)
- Jackson Harry – guitar (2022–2023)

== Discography ==
=== Studio albums ===
List of studio albums with selected details and chart positions
Title	Details	Peak chart positions
Title	Details	AUS
Future Forecast	Released: 26 March 2021; Label: Flightless; Formats: CD, LP, digital download, streaming	52
Taken by Force	Released: 10 February 2023; Label: ATO Records, Cooking Vinyl Australia; Formats: CD, LP, digital download, streaming	—
Chrome Dipped	Released: 30 May 2025; Label: ATO Records (ATO0692); Formats: CD, LP, digital download, streaming	— (Note: Chrome Dipped did not enter the ARIA Top 100 Chart, but peaked at number 10 on the Australian Artists Album Chart.)

=== Extended plays ===
List of EPs with selected details
Title	Details
New Vietnam	Released: 6 April 2018; Label: Anti Fade (ANT-042); Formats: CD, LP, digital download, streaming
Those Who No	Released: 9 November 2018; Label: Anti Fade (ANT-048); Formats: LP, digital download, streaming
Selling. Sucking. Blackmail. Bribes	Released: 26 July 2019; Label: Anti Fade (ANT-058); Formats: LP, digital download, streaming

== Awards and nominations ==
=== ARIA Music Awards ===
The ARIA Music Awards is an annual awards ceremony held by the Australian Recording Industry Association. They commenced in 1987.

Year	Nominee / work	Award	Result	Ref.
2025	Chrome Dipped	Best Hard Rock/Heavy Metal Album	Nominated	

=== Music Victoria Awards ===
The Music Victoria Awards are an annual awards night recognising Victorian music. They commenced in 2006.

Year	Nominee / work	Award	Result	Ref.
2023	Civic	Best Rock/Punk Work	Nominated	
