= Dreamin' (Dom Dolla song) =

2025 single by Dom Dolla

Single by Dom Dolla featuring Daya
- Released: 7 February 2025
- Length: 2:51
- Label: Good Fortune Music
- Songwriters: Dominic Matheson; Daya; Alison Kaplan; Tim Nelson
- Producers: Dom Dolla; Tim Nelson

Dom Dolla singles chronology
"Cave" (2024)	"Dreamin'" (2025)	"Forever" (2025)

Daya singles chronology
"Don't Call" (2024)	"Dreamin'" (2025)	"Infrared" (2025)

"Dreamin'" is a song by Australian record producer Dom Dolla featuring American singer and songwriter Daya. It was released on 7 February 2025 and debuted at number 33 on the ARIA Singles Chart.

At the 2025 ARIA Music Awards, the song won Best Dance/Electronic Release and was nominated for Song of the Year, Best Solo Artist, Best Video, Best Engineered Release and Best Produced Release.

At the 2026 Electronic Dance Music Awards, it was nominated for Music Video of the Year, the Anyma Remix for Remix of the Year and it won Tech House Song of the Year.

== Music video ==
The Kyle Caulfield and Shevin Dissanayake directed music video was filmed in Tokyo, Japan.

== Versions ==
Digital download

- "Dreamin'" – 2:51
- "Dreamin'" (Anyma remix) – 3:31
- "Dreamin'" (Eli Brown remix) – 2:57

== Charts ==
=== Weekly charts ===
Weekly chart performance for "Dreamin'"
Chart (2025)	Peak position
Australia (ARIA)	33
US Hot Dance/Electronic Songs (Billboard)	5

=== Year-end charts ===
Year-end chart performance for "Dreamin'"
Chart (2025)	Position
Australian Artist (ARIA)	11
US Hot Dance/Electronic Songs (Billboard)	16

== Certifications ==
Certifications for "Dreamin'"
Region	Certification	Certified units/sales
Australia (ARIA)	Platinum	70,000^{‡}
^{‡} Sales+streaming figures based on certification alone.
