= Paul Kelly's Christmas Train =

Studio album by Paul Kelly
- Released: 19 November 2021
- Length: 74:37
- Label: Self-released
- Producer: Paul Kelly

Paul Kelly chronology
Please Leave Your Light On (2020)	Paul Kelly's Christmas Train (2021)	Fever Longing Still (2024)

Singles from Paul Kelly's Christmas Train
- 1. "Christmas" Released: 5 November 2021

Paul Kelly's Christmas Train is the twenty-eighth studio album and the first Christmas album by Paul Kelly, released on 19 November 2021. It was announced on 14 October 2021. The 22-track album traverses language and cultural significance, from a Latin hymn to a traditional Irish folk ballad, and a well-known carol sung in te reo Maori.

In 2022, the album was re-released to include "Maybe This Christmas".

In 2023, the album was re-released again, with two new tracks, "The Cherry Tree Carol" and "White Wine in the Sun".

== Track listing ==
Paul Kelly's Christmas Train track listing
No.	Title	Writer(s)	Length
1.	"Nativity"		2:04
2.	"Silent Night" (with Alice Keath and Sime Nugent)	Franz Xaver Gruber, Joseph Mohr	3:38
3.	"Swing Around the Sun"	Casey Bennetto	4:25
4.	"Christmas"	Chris Harrington, Wes Harrington	3:51
5.	"Christmas (Baby, Please Come Home)" (with Linda Bull)	Jeff Barry, Ellie Greenwich, Phil Spector	3:02
6.	"Little Drummer Boy"	Harry Simeone, Katherine Kennicott Davis, Henry Onorati	3:13
7.	"Arthur McBride"		5:23
8.	"The Virgin Mary Had One Son" (with Emma Donovan)		3:12
9.	"Tapu te Pō (O Holy Night)" (with Marlon Williams and Dhungala Children's Choir)	Adolphe Adam	3:15
10.	"Shalom Aleichem" (with Lior, Alice Keath and Emily Lubitz)		3:17
11.	"The Oxen"		2:46
12.	"The Friendly Beasts" (with Kasey Chambers and Dan Kelly)		2:45
13.	"Three Drovers" (with Alice Keath and Sime Nugent)		1:45
14.	"Christmas Must Be Tonight"	Robbie Robertson	3:59
15.	"Surah Maryam" (with Waleed Aly)		3:03
16.	"Coventry Carol" (with Kate Miller-Heidke, Jess Hitchcock, Alice Keath and Marlon Williams)		3:40
17.	"In the Hot Sun of a Christmas Day"		3:55
18.	"How to Make Gravy" (2021 version)	Paul Kelly	5:28
19.	"Christmas Train" (with Vika Bull)		2:13
20.	"Come Thou Fount of Every Blessing"	Robert Robinson	4:14
21.	"Intonent Hodie" (with Alice Keath)		2:00
22.	"What Are You Doing New Year's Eve?" (with Alma Zygier)	Frank Loesser	3:29
Total length:			74:37

2022 edition
No.	Title	Writer(s)	Length
1.	"Maybe This Christmas"	Ron Sexsmith	2:31

2023 edition
No.	Title	Writer(s)	Length
18.	"The Cherry Tree Carol"		2:49
24.	"White Wine in the Sun"	Tim Minchin	2:36

== Charts ==
=== Weekly charts ===
Weekly chart performance for Paul Kelly's Christmas Train
Chart (2021–2022)	Peak position
Australian Albums (ARIA)	1

=== Year-end charts ===
Year-end chart performance for Paul Kelly's Christmas Train
Chart (2021)	Position
Australian Albums (ARIA)	58

== Release history ==
Release history and formats for Paul Kelly's Christmas Train
Country	Date	Edition	Format	Label	Catalogue
Australia	19 November 2021	Original release	Compact disc; 2×LP; digital download; streaming	Gawd Aggie, EMI	GAWD035CD / GAWD035LP
Australia	2 December 2022	2022 edition	digital download; streaming	Gawd Aggie	—N/a
Australia	10 November 2023	2023 edition	digital download; streaming	Gawd Aggie	—N/a
