= Seventy (album) =

Studio album by Paul Kelly
- Released: 7 November 2025
- Length: 42:14
- Label: EMI
- Producers: Paul Kelly; Steven Schram

Paul Kelly chronology
Fever Longing Still (2024)	Seventy (2025)

Singles from Seventy
- 1. "Rita Wrote a Letter" Released: 15 August 2025; 2. "The Body Keeps the Score" Released: 24 September 2025; 3. "Tell Us a Story" Released: 21 November 2025

Seventy is the thirtieth studio album by Australian musician Paul Kelly, released on 7 November 2025. The album's title refers to Kelly's age. Upon announcement in August 2025, Kelly said the album is his "most varied album yet".

A deluxe version of the album is scheduled for 28 August 2026 featuring a new recording of the Hoagy Carmichael "Stardust".

At the 2026 ARIA Music Awards it was nominated for Best Adult Contemporary Album.

== Singles ==
"Rita Wrote a Letter" was released on 15 August 2025 as the album's lead single and is the sequel to Kelly's 1996 song, "How to Make Gravy". Kelly said "I've been mulling over the idea of a sequel to 'How to Make Gravy' from Rita's point of view for quite some time. About five years ago I wrote down the words, 'Rita wrote a letter' and thought, 'There’s my title'."

"The Body Keeps the Score", named after the book of the same name by Bessel van der Kolk, was released on 24 September 2025. At the time of its release, Kelly said in a statement: "It's an investigation into the complex effects of trauma, how it can become buried in our bodies. How it can surface unexpectedly and cause harm not only to the person who experienced the trauma but to those who love them. I carried the title with me ever since that drive until one day last year at Bill Miller's place, playing around with a tune, the words started to come out."

"Tell Us a Story" (Full Length) was released on 21 November 2025. It combines both part A and part B.

== Reception ==
Professional ratings
Review scores
Source	Rating
The Guardian	4/5 stars
Americana UK	8/10 stars

Andrew Stafford from The Guardian said "Seventy is themed around ageing, regrets and reflections on how the world will keep turning long after we're gone." and said " these 13 songs (including the bookends 'Tell Us a Story', parts one and two) are warm, memorable and easy to like."

Graeme Tait from Americana UK said "From rock and new wave to folk and shades of americana, sometimes laidback, sometimes upbeat, but always one-hundred per cent Kelly and his distinctive songwriting style.".

In reviewing the album on Double J, Al Newstead said "The record begins and ends with 'Tell Us a Story', a warm, welcoming number that shouts out The Lord of the Rings, The Bible, Homer's Odyssey, and more." Newstead closed the review saying "When it comes to alchemising words and music into tuneful, timeless stories we love singing and sharing, few can match Paul Kelly's dedication and natural talent for the craft."

Doug Collette from Glide Magazine called the album "Thought Provoking Vintage Flavoured Folk".

Lisa Hafey from Essentially Pop said "Seventy is an album about getting older. Even though Kelly doesn't necessarily mention it in so many words, it's there, right from the cover photograph, a stunning black and white portrait by photographer Dean Podmore... He's seen a lot in that time, and realised what battles are worth fighting and those that aren't. One thing's for sure, there's plenty of life in Paul Kelly yet."

Tyler Jenke from The Music said "Seventy, is arguably one of the year's finest records. At its core, it's a record based around the importance of storytelling, Kelly's mastery of the concept, and the cultural and societal resonance of such a practice."

== Track listing ==
Seventy track listing
No.	Title	Lyrics	Music	Length
1.	"Tell Us a Story (Part A)"	Paul Kelly	P. Kelly	3:49
2.	"Don't Give Up on Me" (featuring Meg Washington)	Sam Dixon; Meg Washington	P. Kelly; Dixon; Washington	3:26
3.	"Rita Wrote a Letter"	Dan Kelly	P. Kelly; D. Kellly	4:14
4.	"The Body Keeps the Score"	P. Kelly; Billy Miller	Miller	3:27
5.	"I Keep on Coming Back for More"	P. Kelly	P. Kelly	3:15
6.	"Take It Handy"	P. Kelly	P. Kelly	2:46
7.	"Happy Birthday, Ada Mae"	P. Kelly	P. Kelly	3:22
8.	"The Magpies"	Denis Glover	P. Kelly	2:42
9.	"Made for Me" (featuring Rebecca Barnard)	P. Kelly	P. Kelly	3:21
10.	"Sailing to Byzantium"	W. B. Yeats	P. Kelly; James Ledger	3:22
11.	"My Body Felt No Pain"	P. Kelly	P. Kelly	2:14
12.	"I'm Not Afraid of the Dark"	P. Kelly	P. Kelly; Ledger	3:45
13.	"Tell Us a Story (Part B)"	P. Kelly	P. Kelly	2:31
Total length:				42:14

Seventy (Deluxe) track listing
No.	Title	Lyrics	Music	Length
1.	"Tell Us a Story (complete)"	P. Kelly	P. Kelly	6:01
13.	"Stardust"	Mitchell Parish	Hoagy Carmichael	3:01

== Personnel ==
Credits adapted from Tidal.

- Paul Kelly – vocals, production (all tracks); guitar (tracks 1, 2, 6–13), harmonica (2)
- Steven Schram – production, mixing
- Adam Ayan – mastering
- Bill McDonald – bass guitar
- Dan Kelly – guitar (1–7, 9–13), background vocals (1, 6, 12), banjo (8)
- Cameron Bruce – keyboards (1–7, 9, 10), organ (8, 12), piano (11), background vocals (12)
- Ashley Naylor – guitar (1–4, 6–13)
- Peter Luscombe – drums (2–13)
- Megan Washington – vocals (2)
- Maddy Kelly – background vocals (7)
- Alice Keath – background vocals (8, 12)
- Rebecca Barnard – vocals (9)
- Billy Miller – background vocals (12)

== Charts ==
=== Weekly chart performance ===
Chart performance for Seventy
Chart (2025–2026)	Peak position
Australian Albums (ARIA)	2

=== Year-end charts ===
Year-end chart performance for Seventy
Chart (2025)	Position
Australian Artist Albums (ARIA)	17
