= Fever Longing Still =

Studio album by Paul Kelly
- Released: 1 November 2024
- Studio: Roundhead (New Zealand)
- Length: 41:41
- Label: EMI
- Producers: Paul Kelly; Steven Schram

Paul Kelly chronology
Paul Kelly's Christmas Train (2021)	Fever Longing Still (2024)	Seventy (2025)

Singles from Fever Longing Still
- 1. "Taught by Experts" Released: 2 August 2024; 2. "Going to the River with Dad" Released: 16 August 2024; 3. "Houndstooth Dress" Released: 27 September 2024; 4. "All Those Smiling Faces" Released: 27 September 2024

Fever Longing Still is the twenty-ninth studio album by Australian musician Paul Kelly, released on 1 November 2024. The album's title is lifted from William Shakespeare's Sonnet 147.

Upon announcement on 1 August 2024, Kelly said "There has been a long gap since the last album of new songs and I realise now that this record is a bit like Gossip, an album with a long gestation where the songs are all quite different to each other in style."

At the 2025 ARIA Music Awards, the album was nominated for Best Adult Contemporary Album and Best Solo Artist.

== Singles ==
Lead single is a re-recorded version of "Taught by Experts", which is included on his Live, May 1992 album and recorded on his 1999 album, Smoke.

"Going to the River with Dad" was released on 16 August 2024 as the album's second single.

== Reception ==
Professional ratings
Review scores
Source	Rating
Rolling Stone Australia	4/5 stars
The Guardian	4/5 stars
Americana UK	9/10 stars

James Jennings from Rolling Stone Australia said "Across 12 tracks, several classic Kelly personas appear: the lustful horndog, the country crooner and pop-rock powerhouse. Capturing nostalgia is perhaps Kelly's finest gift, and here there’'s two heartstring-tuggers up there with his best." In a positive review, Bernard Zuel from The Guardian said "the Melbourne songwriter goes back to basics – assembling a classic rock band who tumble through tracks of desire and devotion."

Graeme Tait from Americana UK said "Kelly's songs endeavour to decipher the language of love in all its different shades, and with Fever Longing Still, he has once again delivered an album that is both a captivating and immersive listen, that immediately grabs the attention and holds it right to the final note."

== Track listing ==
All tracks are written by Paul Kelly; "All Those Smiling Faces" written with Dana Gioia; "Eight Hours Sleep" written with Wendell Berry and Billy Miller. All tracks are produced by Kelly and Steven Schram.

Fever Longing Still track listing
No.	Title	Length
1.	"Houndstooth Dress"	4:05
2.	"Love Has Made a Fool of Me"	4:08
3.	"Taught by Experts"	3:01
4.	"Hello Melancholy, Hello Joy"	2:54
5.	"Northern Rivers"	2:53
6.	"Double Business Bound"	4:08
7.	"Let's Work It Out in Bed"	2:50
8.	"All Those Smiling Faces"	3:40
9.	"Harpoon to the Heart"	3:21
10.	"Back to the Future"	3:06
11.	"Eight Hours Sleep"	3:41
12.	"Going to the River with Dad"	3:54
Total length:		41:41

== Charts ==
=== Weekly charts ===
Weekly chart performance for Fever Longing Still
Chart (2024)	Peak position
Australian Albums (ARIA)	3

=== Year-end charts ===
2024 year-end chart performance for Fever Longing Still
Chart (2024)	Position
Australian Artist Albums (ARIA)	28
