= Young Franco =

Australian DJ and producer (born 1994)

- Born: Joseph Da Rin De Barbera; 11 March 1994 (age 32); Brisbane, Queensland, Australia
- Genres: Electronic; hip hop; R&B; dance
- Occupations: DJ; record producer; musician
- Instruments: Digital audio workstation; drum machines
- Years active: 2014–present
- Label: Of Leisure
- Website: youngfranco.com.au

Joseph Da Rin de Barbera (born 11 March 1994), who performs as Young Franco, is an Australian DJ and record producer from Brisbane, Queensland. He is based in Sydney, New South Wales.

== Career ==
Barbera has performed at many Australian festivals, including Splendour in the Grass and Falls Festival.

On 19 November 2021, Young Franco released "Real Nice (H.C.T.F.)" with Tkay Maidza featuring Nerve which served as the theme song for the A-League, the Australian and New Zealand professional soccer league.

In January 2025, Young Franco released his debut studio album, It's Franky Baby.

== Discography ==
=== Albums ===
List of studio albums, with selected chart positions and certifications
Title	Details	Peak chart positions
Title	Details	AUS Artist
It's Franky Baby!	Released: January 2025; Format: CD, LP, digital; Label: Universal Music (7536261)	10

=== Certified or charted singles ===
List of certified of charted singles, with year released, selected chart positions, and album name shown
Title	Year	Peak chart positions	Certifications
Title	Year	NZ Hot	Certifications
"About This Thing" (featuring Scrufizzer)	2017	—	ARIA: Gold
"Fallin' Apart" (featuring Denzel Curry and Pell)	2020	22	
"Peaches" (with Charlotte Plank)	2025	28	

== Awards and nominations ==
=== ARIA Music Awards ===
The ARIA Music Awards is an annual awards ceremony held by the Australian Recording Industry Association. They commenced in 1987.

Year	Nominee / work	Award	Result	Ref.
2025	It's Franky Baby!	Best Solo Artist	Nominated	
2025	It's Franky Baby!	Michael Gudinski Breakthrough Artist	Nominated	

=== Queensland Music Awards ===
The Queensland Music Awards (previously known as Q Song Awards) are annual awards celebrating Queensland, Australia's emerging artists. They commenced in 2006.

Year	Nominee / work	Award	Result	Ref.
2021	"Juice" (featuring Pell)	Electronic / Dance Award	Won	
2025	"Wake Up" (featuring Master Peace)	Song of the Year	Won	
2025	"Wake Up" (featuring Master Peace)	Electronic / Dance Award	Won	
2025	Young Franco	Export Achievement	Won	
2026	"Lose Control"	Electronic / Dance Award	Won	
