= Tilt (Confidence Man album) =

Studio album by Confidence Man
- Released: 1 April 2022
- Genre: House; big beat
- Length: 44:44
- Label: I Oh You
- Producer: Confidence Man

Confidence Man chronology
Confident Music for Confident People (2018)	Tilt (2022)	Re-Tilt (2023)

Singles from Tilt
- 1. "Holiday" Released: 10 November 2021; 2. "Feels Like a Different Thing" Released: 27 January 2022; 3. "Woman" Released: 3 March 2022; 4. "Luvin U Is Easy" Released: 1 April 2022

Tilt is the second studio album by Australian electro pop band, Confidence Man. It was announced on 10 November 2021, alongside the album's lead single, "Holiday" and released on 1 April 2022. According to the album's announcement press release, the album is "fierce, flirty and full of anthems" and listeners "might need to sit down before you hit play".

Upon release, it was met with favourable reviews and peaked at number seven on the Australian album chart. At the 2022 ARIA Music Awards, the album was nominated for Best Dance/Electronic Release. At the AIR Awards of 2023, the album won Best Independent Dance or Electronica Album or EP. The Mushroom team were also nominated for Independent Marketing Team of the Year and Independent Publicity Team of the Year.

== Release and promotion ==
On 10 November 2021, the duo announced the album alongside its lead single, "Holiday". The second single and music video, "Feels Like a Different Thing", was released on 27 January 2022. "Woman", the album's third single, was released on 3 March 2022 alongside a music video. The album's final single, "Luvin U Is Easy", was released on 1 April 2022. A music video for "Luvin U Is Easy" was released on 1 June 2022.

A remix EP, titled Re-Tilt, was released on 30 September 2022. The EP featured remixes from Tame Impala, Totally Enormous Extinct Dinosaurs, X-Coast, Chai, CC:DISCO!, Daniel Avery, and Erol Alkan.

== Reception ==
Professional ratings
Aggregate scores
Source	Rating
Metacritic	80/100
Review scores
Source	Rating
AllMusic	4/5 stars
Clash	9/10
DIY	3/5 stars
musicOMH	4/5 stars
NME	4/5 stars
PopMatters	7/10
The Skinny	4/5 stars

Tilt received generally favorable reviews from music critics. At Metacritic, which assigns a normalized rating out of 100 to reviews from mainstream critics, the album received an average score of 80, based on nine reviews.

Neil Z. Yeung from AllMusic wrote: "Four years after their painfully hip debut, Confident Music for Confident People, Australia's Confidence Man amassed even more of their titular surety, letting their guard down and fully embracing their dance roots on the celebratory Tilt. While the devastating cool of their first album made it feel like trying to get into a club with a high cover charge, Tilt throws the doors open and invites everyone to the party, going full-bore on a collection of '90s house-indebted thrills that uplift listeners to another plane of pure euphoria." concluding saying, "The cathartic release is absolutely joyous on this stylish party album, a heaping dose of maximalist escapism from a quartet that just wants you to dance your cares away."

Patrick Clarke from NME called it "a decidedly different experience to its predecessor" saying "it's less silly but more assured, happy to let pumping '90s-indebted rave instrumentals take centre stage as often as Planet and Bones' storytelling." Clarke also said "Tilt is a record that proves that campness and ridiculousness doesn't have to come at the expense of real depth."

Niamh Carey from The Skinny said "Tilt is a euphoric album that audaciously borrows from early 90s dance anthems. It is great fun; the production expertly reproduces the sounds of a particularly interesting time for electronic music without taking itself too seriously."

== Track listing ==
1. "Woman" – 4:28
2. "Feels Like a Different Thing" – 3:47
3. "What I Like" – 3:23
4. "Toy Boy" – 3:30
5. "Luvin U Is Easy" – 4:24
6. "Holiday" – 4:48
7. "Trumpet Song" – 3:23
8. "Angry Girl" – 2:52
9. "Push It Up" – 3:24
10. "Kiss N Tell" – 0:54
11. "Break It Bought It" – 3:42
12. "Relieve the Pressure" – 6:09

== Charts ==
Chart performance for Tilt
Chart (2022)	Peak position
Australian Albums (ARIA)	7
Scottish Albums (OCC)	34
UK Dance Albums (OCC)	1
UK Album Downloads (OCC)	29
UK Independent Albums (OCC)	11
