= Onefour =

Australian drill group

ONEFOUR
- Origin: Mount Druitt, Sydney, New South Wales, Australia
- Genre: Drill
- Years active: 2014–present
- Members: Spenny; Celly; J Emz; Lekks
- Past members: YP
- Website: www.onefour27.com

Onefour (stylised in all caps) are an Australian drill group originating from the Western Sydney suburb of Mount Druitt. They are regarded by many as the pioneers of drill music in Australia, following a run of viral singles in 2019. The band was formed in 2014, going on hiatus for some years after three members were imprisoned in 2019 after a pub brawl in 2018. As of 2026 the band has three members in Australia: J Emz, Spenny, and Celly, while Lekks now lives in New Zealand after being deported.

Onefour have had collaborations with or supported a number of major artists, including several with the Kid Laroi, and British rappers Central Cee and Dave. Their debut EP, Against All Odds, released in November 2020, peaked at No. 7 on the ARIA Charts (Australia) and No. 8 in New Zealand. They (four members) released their debut album, Look At Me Now on 13 June 2025, which includes collaborations with Nemzzz, Headie One, and Abra Cadabra. The album was nominated for several awards. Onefour have planned a regional tour of Australia in February–March 2027.

== Name and history ==
The five original members (brothers Jerome and Pio "YP" Misa, Salec "Lekks" Su’a, Dahcell "Celly" Ramos, and Spencer "Spenny" Magalogo) grew up in Mount Druitt, one of Sydney's most disadvantaged suburbs. They knew each other from their schools and their local church, the Church of Jesus Christ of Latter-day Saints (Mormons), where they all sang in the choir. They are of Samoan origin, mostly born in Australia, although founding member Salec "Lekks" Su'a was born in New Zealand.

Onefour's name has been reported to derive from a local street gang, NF14; however, the members say that it is from 2014, the year they launched as a hip hop group.

In their earlier work, the group's rivalry with 21 District (a group from Parramatta (Note: Since reformed and involved in youth outreach work)) played a big role in their lyrics. The rivalry applies to a greater crime and gang war between the Greater West suburbs of Sydney and the Inner West suburbs of Sydney stemming back to the 1990s. However, the group signalled a change after several members had been imprisoned for a violent brawl in 2018, saying in 2025 that music was going to be their only focus in the future, and that they did not want to be defined by their past acts.

YP left the band to become a Christian priest in 2024.

== Members ==
=== Current members ===
Members as of September 2026:

- J Emz (born Jerome Misa) (2014–present)
- Spencer "Spenny" Magalogo (2014–present)
- Dahcell "Celly" Ramos (2014–present)
- Salec "Lekks" Su'a (2014–present) (Note: Lekks was deported to New Zealand after completing a three-year prison sentence in Australia, and was refused re-entry to Australia. However, he performed on their debut album in 2025, and remains a member of the band.)

=== Former members ===
- Pio "YP" Misa (2019–2023)

== Music ==
Onefour have been labelled Australia's first drill rappers, with a sound heavily derivative of UK drill music, with the group incorporating UK drill's production style. However, they have a unique sound, which represents a Western Sydney subculture where young men are "lads", "earchers" or "eshays". Onefour were the first Islanders in this subculture to rap in an Australian accent.

Their original singles "The Message" and "Spot the Difference" (both 2019) had a UK-inspired production and lyric style (influenced by group Harlem Spartans), but with an Australian accent. In 2024 a journalist wrote that their music "often juxtaposes heavy rap verses with soothing gospel-like vocals".

Their 2020 song, "Welcome to prison", released after three members had been sentenced to prison, centred on the cycle of violence and incarceration rife in their community.

However they rarely perform live (8 shows in the 6 years preceding November 2023), which they blame on intervention by police. After their music had started to take off, they were booked as the supporting act for UK rapper Dave in Sydney and Melbourne on his tour of Australia in 2019. However, after the venues were informed about the potential risks of violence with 21 District by police, they cancelled the acts. Later in the year, the band announced their first headline tour playing in Sydney, Melbourne, Perth, Adelaide, and Auckland. All venues cancelled apart from Auckland, and Spenny was the only member to perform there; YP, Celly, and Lekks were not allowed to leave the country owing to upcoming court appearances, and J Emz was denied entry to New Zealand on arrival because of his criminal history.

In May 2022, The Kid Laroi called them onto the stage, unannounced, in front of a crowd of 20,000 in Sydney – Onefour's first performance in two and a half years. They performed at the 2023 Listen Out festival.

In April 2025, the group announced the forthcoming release of their debut album Look At Me Now on 13 June 2025. At that time, there were four members in the band: J Emz, Celly, Lekks, and Spenny, after YP had departed to become a priest, and Lekks remained in New Zealand after being deported after completion of his prison sentence. The 15-track album includes collaborations with several British drill rappers, including Nemzzz, Headie One, and Abra Cadabra, as well as a second collaboration with the Kid Laroi, on the track "Distant Strangers".

In June 2025, British rapper Central Cee called Onefour onto the stage for a surprise performance collaboration. This was a part of the UK drill artist's Can't Rush Greatness World Tour, at Qudos Bank Arena in Sydney.

In September 2026, the three original remaining members of the band joined Jimmy Barnes and Jessica Mauboy in the studio to perform a version of Phil Collins's 1981 song "In the Air Tonight" for triple j's Like a Version. The gig was organised by Barnes' daughter, Mahalia Barnes. The group planned a national tour of regional Australia, dubbed BACKOUTSIDE, in September and October; however, this has been postponed to February–March 2027 owing to "unforeseen circumstances". Starting in Newcastle, Onefour will play in various regional towns in Queensland and New South Wales, as well as Canberra.

They have released three tracks in 2026: "Intrusive Thoughts", "Sun in My Eyes", and "Him".

== Popularity and recognition ==
"The Message" (2019) was Onefour's breakthrough single, which went viral and was praised by major rap artists such as Dave and A$AP Ferg.

The video for their 2021 single "In the Beginning" achieved one million views on YouTube in 48 hours, and became the group's first single to chart, debuting at number 39 on the ARIA Singles Chart.

Netflix released a documentary about the group on 27 October 2023, titled ONEFOUR: Against All Odds, written and directed by Gabriel Gasparinatos and produced by Stranger Than Fiction. The film premiered at SXSW Sydney, where there was an increased police presence, including undercover officers and metal detectors. Esquire magazine called it "the most controversial documentary of the year". Gasparinatos said that he was first attracted to the group as subjects because of their "raw talent"; however, it was the police efforts to silence them, and the diverse views about what Onefour represented that made the film interesting:

Australia loves to celebrate an underdog or a criminal - Ned Kelly is a national icon, our unofficial anthem "Waltzing Matilda" is about a sheep thief. So, it was kind of fascinating that the public didn't get behind OneFour in the same way. There's an element of it motivated by race, part of it is class. There's also a stigma around a place like Mount Druitt - maybe people wanted to avoid promoting that version of this country, but it's a far more accurate depiction of Australia today than the surfy, sun-kissed lifestyle we market.

Culture journalist Osman Faruqi has observed that there would be "people in parts of south London or Chicago who know more about Mount Druitt than they do about Bondi Beach" owing to the popularity of Onefour. Their manager is (or was) Ricky Simandjuntak.

As of October 2026, Onefour has around 1.5m million monthly listeners on Spotify.

== Legal issues ==
While the group has established themselves as one of the most prominent acts to have come out of Australia, the group has also been plagued by run-ins with the law.

In July 2019, at a time when violent street gangs had been active in western Sydney, Strike Force Raptor, a branch of NSW Police focused on organised crime, heard that some of Onefour's lyrics had the potential to incite acts of violence by these gangs, in particular "The Message", which includes a line that references the stabbing death of Tino Henry, a member of 21 District, as well as other lyrics mentioning retaliation and the use of knives. Strike Force Imbara, focused on gang feuds, also kept tabs on the band. One sergeant said on radio "I'm going to use everything in my power to make your life miserable, until you stop doing what you're doing". Police have admitted to doing "everything in [their] power" to have them stop rapping about outlaw bikie gangs, and so-called "postcode wars" (gang violence associated with different suburbs), and inciting violence. Police have tried to get their music pulled from streaming platforms. In 2019, Onefour were forced to cancel their first national tour following police pressure on venues.

Criminologists have said that the conclusion that their music incites violence is simply wrong "- it's simply not played out in the statistics". Culture journalist Osman Faruqi says that the targeting of OneFour by police is part of a larger picture, "about who is permitted to tell stories in Australia and make a living out of it".

=== Pub brawl ===
In December 2019, three members of the rap group – YP (Pio Misa), Lekks (Salec Su'a), Celly (Dahcell Ramos) – were jailed over several charges including reckless grievous bodily harm after a violent interaction at the Carousel Inn in Rooty Hill in July 2018. YP used a chair leg as a weapon, and Celly hit a man with a hammer. Justice James Bennett, who delivered the sentences, said that the fight was the result of an escalation of an argument which included "racial comments".

Misa (YP) was sentenced to four years in prison with a two-year non-parole period; he was released in December 2021.

Su'a (Lekks) was sentenced to four-and-a-half years' jail with a non-parole period of two years and three months, eligible for parole in December 2021. He was deported to New Zealand in January 2023, and appeared at a show in Tauranga with Spenny on 3 January 2023. He remains a member of the band despit living in New Zealand.

Ramos (Celly) was sentenced to ten years' jail with a non-parole period of six, for having hit a man in the head with a hammer repeatedly. He was originally eligible for parole in December 2024. However, after appealing his charges, his sentence was reduced to eight years' jail with a non-parole period of four years and nine months, after the appeal judge heard that he was remorseful, and had rehabilitated. He had had a tough childhood which had led to substance abuse as well as ongoing depression. He was released on 7 June 2023.

=== New start ===
In 2022, OneFour distanced itself from the NF14 gang. While police remain concerned about their use of referencing violence in their lyrics, with Detective Inspector Weinstein saying "It is pretty well entrenched in drill music that unless you’ve done that crime or you are in that gang, you cannot sing about that actual activity", the band members say that their lyrics are honest and they are just talking about their lives, not inciting violence. Jioji Ravulo, chair of social work and policy studies at the University of Sydney, whose research concentrates on young people in the criminal justice system, says that "music is therapeutic for disenfranchised young people" and does not in itself provoke crime.

In 2025, after their first album was produced, J Emz, while Celly and Spenny said that they had made mistakes in the past, they had "grown up a lot" and were determined to make their music the main focus of their lives: "So much has happened in our career to knock us off track – some of that is our fault, some of it isn’t, but we’ve gotten much better at holding each other accountable".

=== Murder plot ===
On 11 January 2024, police raided the houses of two men, arresting 26-year-old Brandon Maseuli and 20-year-old Yousef Rima over an alleged plot to kill YP, Celly14, Spenny, and J Emz for "financial reward". One man was charged with 20 offences and the other man with five, both including conspiracy to murder. Onefour had no knowledge of the threat to them.

== Awards and nominations ==
=== APRA Awards ===
The APRA Awards are several award ceremonies run in Australia by the Australasian Performing Right Association (APRA) to recognise composing and song-writing skills, sales and airplay performance by its members annually.

Year	Nominee / work	Award	Result	Ref.
2021	"In the Beginning"	Most Performed Hip Hop / Rap Work	Nominated	
2022	"My City" (with The Kid LAROI)	Most Performed Hip Hop / Rap Work	Nominated	
2024	"Comma's" (featuring CG)	Most Performed Hip Hop/Rap Work	Won	
2026	"Spinnin'" (featuring Nemzzz)	Most Performed Hip Hop/Rap Work	Won	

=== ARIA Music Awards ===
The ARIA Music Awards is an annual award ceremony event celebrating the Australian music industry.

Year	Nominee / work	Award	Result	Ref.
2023	"Comma's" (featuring CG)	Best Hip Hop/Rap Release	Nominated	
2024	"Natural Habitat"	Best Hip Hop/Rap Release	Nominated	
2025	Look at Me Now	Best Hip Hop/Rap Release	Nominated	
2025	Onefour and Nemzzz – "Spinnin"	Song of the Year	Nominated	

=== J Awards ===
The J Awards are an annual series of Australian music awards that were established by the Australian Broadcasting Corporation's youth-focused radio station Triple J. They commenced in 2005. Onefour have received one nomination.

Year	Nominee / work	Award	Result	Ref.
2020	"Welcome to Prison"	Australian Video of the Year	Nominated	
2025	Look at Me Now	Australian Album of the Year	Nominated	

=== NSW Music Prize ===
The NSW Music Prize aims to "celebrate, support and incentivise" the NSW's most talented artists, with "the aim of inspiring the next generations of stars". It commenced in 2025.

Year	Nominee / work	Award	Result	Ref.
2025	Look At Me Now	NSW Music Prize	Nominated	

== Discography ==
=== Albums ===
List of albums, with release date and label shown
Title	Details	Peak chart positions	
Title	Details	AUS	NZ
Look at Me Now	Released: 13 June 2025; Label: Onefour; Formats: LP, Digital download, streaming	2	29

=== Extended plays ===
List of EPs, with release date and label shown
Title	Details	Peak chart positions	
Title	Details	AUS	NZ
Against All Odds	Released: 13 November 2020; Label: Onefour; Formats: digital download, streaming	7	8

=== Singles ===
==== As lead artist ====
List of singles, with year released, selected chart positions, and album name shown
Title	Year	Peak chart positions		Certifications	Album
Title	Year	AUS	NZ	Certifications	Album
"Ready for War"	2017	—	—		Non-album singles
"What You Know"	2018	—	—	ARIA: Gold	Non-album singles
"Shanks and Shivs"	2019	—	—	ARIA: Gold	Non-album singles
"The Message"	2019	—	—	ARIA: 2× Platinum; RMNZ: Platinum	Non-album singles
"Spot the Difference"	2019	—	—	ARIA: 3× Platinum; RMNZ: Platinum	Non-album singles
"Ladz in the Hood"	2019	—	—	ARIA: Platinum; RMNZ: Gold	Non-album singles
"Ben 10"	2019	—	—	ARIA: Gold	Non-album singles
"In the Beginning"	2019	39	—	ARIA: Platinum; RMNZ: Gold	Non-album singles
"Hectic" (with Manu Crooks, featuring J Emz)	2020	—	—		Non-album singles
"Welcome to Prison"	2020	33	—	ARIA: Platinum; RMNZ: Platinum	Non-album singles
"Say It Again" (with A$AP Ferg)	2020	34	— (Note: "Say It Again" did not enter the NZ Top 40 Singles Chart, but did peak at number twelve on the NZ Hot Singles Chart.)	ARIA: Platinum	Non-album singles
"Home and Away"	2020	48	—	ARIA: Gold; RMNZ: Gold	Against All Odds
"My City" (with the Kid Laroi)	2020	28	—	ARIA: Platinum; RMNZ: Gold	Against All Odds
"Better" (with Dutchavelli & Carnage)	2020	52	—		Against All Odds
"Won't Stop" (with B Wise)	2020	—	— (Note: "Won't Stop" did not enter the NZ Top 40 Singles Chart, but did peak at number thirty on the NZ Hot Singles Chart.)		Non-album singles
"Street Guide (Part 01)"	2021	54	— (Note: "Street Guide (Part 01)" did not enter the NZ Top 40 Singles Chart, but did peak at number six on the NZ Hot Singles Chart.)	ARIA: Gold	Non-album singles
"Breaks & Caddy's (Street Guide, Pt. 2)" (featuring Cg)	2021	—	— (Note: "Breaks & Caddy's (Street Guide, Pt. 2)" did not enter the NZ Top 40 Singles Chart, but peaked at number 13 on the NZ Hot Singles Chart.)		Non-album singles
"How We Livin'" (with Kapulet)	2021	—	—		Non-album singles
"Out of Sight" (with YP)	2022	53	— (Note: "Out of Sight" did not enter the NZ Top 40 Singles Chart, but peaked at number five on the NZ Hot Singles Chart.)	ARIA: Platinum; RMNZ: Gold	Non-album singles
"Cap"	2022	—	— (Note: "Cap" did not enter the NZ Top 40 Singles Chart, but peaked at number 12 on the NZ Hot Singles Chart.)		Non-album singles
"Cruise Control"	2022	69	— (Note: "Cruise Control" did not enter the NZ Top 40 Singles Chart, but peaked at number nine on the NZ Hot Singles Chart.)	ARIA: Gold	Non-album singles
"Comma's" (featuring Cg)	2023	65	30	ARIA: Platinum; RMNZ: Gold	Non-album singles
"Freedom of Speech"	2023	—	— (Note: "Freedom of Speech" did not enter the NZ Top 40 Singles Chart, but peaked at number six on the NZ Hot Singles Chart.)		Non-album singles
"Natural Habitat"	2024	—	— (Note: "Natural Habitat" did not enter the NZ Top 40 Singles Chart, but peaked at number 23 on the NZ Hot Singles Chart.)		Non-album singles
"Prove 'Em Wrong"	2024	—	— (Note: "Prove 'Em Wrong" did not enter the NZ Top 40 Singles Chart, but peaked at number 12 on the NZ Hot Singles Chart.)		Non-album singles
"Gang Ties" (featuring Headie One)	2024	—	— (Note: "Gang Ties" did not enter the NZ Top 40 Singles Chart, but peaked at number 10 on the NZ Hot Singles Chart.)		Look at Me Now
"Spinnin" (with Nemzzz)	2024	— (Note: "Spinnin" did not enter the Australian top 100 Singles Chart, but peaked at number 12 on Australian Artist Chart.)	— (Note: "Spinnin" did not enter the NZ Top 40 Singles Chart, but peaked at number 29 on the NZ Hot Singles Chart.)	ARIA: Gold; RMNZ: Gold	Look at Me Now
"Movie" (with Abra Cadabra)	2025	—	— (Note: "Movie" did not enter the NZ Top 40 Singles Chart, but peaked at number 13 on the NZ Hot Singles Chart.)		Look at Me Now
"Phone Call" (with Mabel)	2025	—	— (Note: "Phone Call" did not enter the NZ Top 40 Singles Chart, but peaked at number 22 on the NZ Hot Singles Chart.)		Look at Me Now
"Family"	2025	—	— (Note: "Family" did not enter the NZ Top 40 Singles Chart, but peaked at number 25 on the NZ Hot Singles Chart.)		Look at Me Now
"Luxford"	2025	—	— (Note: "Luxford" did not enter the NZ Top 40 Singles Chart, but peaked at number 12 on the NZ Hot Singles Chart.)		Look at Me Now
"Distant Strangers" (featuring The Kid Laroi and Imogen Heap)	2025	—	—		Look at Me Now
"Leader Freestyle" (with J Emz)	2025	—	—		TBA
"Up & Stuck" (with J Emz)	2025	—	— (Note: "Up & Stuck" did not enter the NZ Top 40 Singles Chart, but peaked at number 32 on the NZ Hot Singles Chart.)		TBA
"Big Don" (with Celly)	2025	—	—		TBA
"Play My Part (Slide)" (with J Emz featuring Stone II)	2025	—	— (Note: "Play My Part (Slide)" did not enter the NZ Top 40 Singles Chart, but peaked at number 27 on the NZ Hot Singles Chart.)		TBA
"Intrusive Thoughts"	2026	—	—		TBA
"Sun in My Eyes" (with Celly)	2026	—	—		TBA
"Him"	2026	—	—		TBA
"In the Air Tonight" (Like a Version) (featuring Jimmy Barnes and Jessica Mauboy	2026	—	—		Non-album single

==== As featured artists ====
List of singles, with year released and album name shown
Title	Year	Album
"Maddest of the Maddest" (Burner featuring Tiny Boost, M24 and Onefour)	2019	Non-album singles
"The Coldest Link Up, Pt. 2" (Tweeko & Sebz Beats featuring Double Lz, OG Skanxy, S Wavey, Tiny Syikes, J.B2, Onefour, Trizzac, PS Hitsquad and Pete & Bas)	2020	Non-album singles
"Ain't It Different (Remix)" (Headie One featuring AJ Tracey, Stormzy and Onefour)	2020	Non-album singles
"Aussie Freaks" (A$AP Ferg featuring Onefour, and Fivio Foreign)	2020	Non-album singles
"Bando Diaries Remix" (Dutchavelli featuring Kekra, Noizy, Divine and Onefour)	2020	
"Hot Minute" (Anfa Rose, 09Scary x Onefour)	2021	
"Imperfections" (Celly featuring Onefour)	2025	

=== Other certified songs ===
List of other certified songs, with year released and album name shown
Title	Year	Certification	Album
"Heartless"	2020	ARIA: Gold; RMNZ: Gold	Against All Odds
