= 3AM (La La La) =

Studio album by Confidence Man
- Released: 18 October 2024
- Length: 47:29
- Label: I Oh You

Confidence Man chronology
Fabric Presents Confidence Man (2024)	3AM (La La La) (2024)

Singles from 3AM (La La La)
- 1. "I Can't Lose You" Released: 7 June 2024; 2. "So What" Released: 6 August 2024; 3. "Control" / "Real Move Touch" Released: 4 October 2024

3AM (La La La) is the third studio album by Australian electro pop band, Confidence Man. It was released on 18 October 2024. The album was announced on 5 June 2024 alongside the release of its lead single, "I Can't Lose You". A deluxe version of the album titled 4AM (La La La) was released on 28 February 2025, featuring three new tracks.

The album was met with critical acclaim and peaked at number nine on the UK Albums Chart; while reaching number forty in Australia. It was shortlisted for Best LP/EP at the 2025 Rolling Stone Australia Awards. At the AIR Awards of 2025, the album was nominated for Best Independent Dance or Electronica Album or EP while I Oh You and Mushroom Music were nominated for Independent Marketing Team of the Year and Independent Publicity Team of the Year.

At the 2025 ARIA Music Awards, the album was nominated for Best Dance/Electronic Release and Best Independent Release.

== Background and release ==
In speaking with NME, the band said: "The whole album is very London-inspired, the sounds and the lyrics. It's [about] a group of friends moving over to London and not knowing what the fuck is going on – just the general excitement of being in a new place." Speaking with Rolling Stone Australia in June 2024, Janet Planet said: "We pretty much wrote every single song when we were wrecked. We'd get blasted and stay up till 9 am coming up with music, but we noticed that 3 am was the hottest time for when we were on it and the best ideas were coming out."

== Critical reception ==
Professional ratings
Aggregate scores
Source	Rating
Metacritic	82/100
Review scores
Source	Rating
Clash	9/10
The Guardian	5/5 stars
NME	4/5 stars
Rolling Stone Australia	4/5 stars

Jenny Valentish from The Guardian called the album "a playful, energetic trip down memory lane". James Jennings from Rolling Stone said "Confidence Man have always straddled the fine line between tongue-in-cheek pop and serious party music, and it's a formula they've perfected on their excellent third album."

Gary Ryan from NME said "Inspired by '90s saucer-eyed rave culture and London nightlife, their third album sees Confidence Man raise the hedonism stakes." Robin Murray from Clash called the album "A spectacular slice of dancefloor deviance" also saying " 3AM (La La La) is Confidence Man at their raviest, their naughtiest, their most confident."

=== Year-end lists ===
Select year-end rankings for 3AM (La La La)
Publication/critic	Accolade	Rank	Ref.
Dork	Albums of the Year 2024	11	
MusicOMH	Top 50 Albums of 2024	10	
NME	50 Best Albums of 2024	20	
Rough Trade UK	Albums of the Year 2024	82	
Time Out	The Best Albums of 2024	20	

== Track listing ==
3AM (La La La) – standard edition
No.	Title	Writer(s)	Producer(s)	Length
1.	"Who Knows What You'll Find?"	Grace Stephenson; Aiden Moore; Lewis Stephenson	Reggie Goodchild; Mark Ralph^{[a]}	3:35
2.	"I Can't Lose You"	G. Stephenson; Moore; L. Stephenson; James Greenwood	Reggie Goodchild; Ralph^{[a]}	2:33
3.	"Control"	G. Stephenson; Moore; L. Stephenson	Reggie Goodchild	3:44
4.	"So What"	G. Stephenson; Moore; L. Stephenson; Jack McAllister; Johnny Took	Reggie Goodchild; Ralph^{[a]}	3:15
5.	"Breakbeat"	G. Stephenson; Moore; L. Stephenson; Bronte Maguire	Reggie Goodchild	3:33
6.	"Sicko"	G. Stephenson; Moore; L. Stephenson	Reggie Goodchild	6:19
7.	"Real Move Touch" (featuring Sweetie Irie)	G. Stephenson; Moore; Camille Purcell; L. Stephenson; Dean Brent	Reggie Goodchild; Ralph^{[a]}	4:11
8.	"Far Out"	G. Stephenson; Moore; L. Stephenson	Reggie Goodchild	4:05
9.	"Janet"	G. Stephenson; Moore; L. Stephenson; Andrew Smith; Guy Lawrence	Reggie Goodchild	3:27
10.	"So Tru"	G. Stephenson; Moore; L. Stephenson; Ina Wroldsen; Finn Keane	Reggie Goodchild; Keane^{[a]}	2:53
11.	"Wrong Idea"	G. Stephenson; Moore; L. Stephenson	Reggie Goodchild	4:34
12.	"3AM (La La La)"	G. Stephenson; Moore; L. Stephenson	Reggie Goodchild	5:20

4AM (La La La) – deluxe edition
No.	Title	Writer(s)	Producer(s)	Length
13.	"I Heart You" (featuring Eliza Rose)	G. Stephenson; Moore; Emilia Predebon; L. Stephenson; Keane; Eliza Rose	Reggie Goodchild; Keane^{[a]}	2:52
14.	"All My People" (featuring Sweely)	G. Stephenson; Moore; Samuel Hales; L. Stephenson; William Montana	Reggie Goodchild; Sweely	4:28
15.	"Home Again"	G. Stephenson; Moore; L. Stephenson	Reggie Goodchild	5:47

Notes

- ^{^[a]} signifies an additional producer

== Charts ==
Chart performance for 3AM (La La La)
Chart (2024)	Peak position
Australian Albums (ARIA)	40
Scottish Albums (Official Charts)	4
UK Albums (Official Charts)	9
UK Dance Albums (Official Charts)	1
