= Chrome Dipped =

Studio album by Civic
- Released: 30 May 2025
- Studio: Frying Pan (Moina); Tunafish (Fremantle); Poverty Castles (Kangaroo Point); Button Pusher (Preston); Bunnings (Brunswick)
- Length: 37:18
- Label: ATO
- Producer: Kirin J. Callinan

Civic chronology
Taken By Force (2023)	Chrome Dipped (2025)	A Failed Nation (2026)

Singles from Chrome Dipped
- 1. "Chrome Dipped" Released: 19 March 2025

Chrome Dipped is the third studio album by Australian rock band Civic, released on 30 May 2025, via ATO Records, in CD, LP and digital formats.

At the 2025 ARIA Music Awards, the album was nominated for ARIA Award for Best Hard Rock or Heavy Metal Album.

== Background ==
Chrome Dipped succeeds the band's 2023 project, Taken By Force. Produced by Kirin J. Callinan, it is composed of eleven tracks ranging between two and four minutes each, with a total runtime of approximately thirty-seven minutes. The title track was released as the album's lead single on 19 March 2025, alongside a music video directed by Marcus Coblyn.

== Reception ==
Professional ratings
Review scores
Source	Rating
Distorted Sound	7/10
Mojo	4/5 stars
New Noise	3.5/5 stars

New Noise rated the album three and a half stars and described it as "a veritable cornucopia of punk and post-punk sounds, and of influences both modern and old." Distorted Sound assigned it a rating of seven out of ten, referring to it as "a fun rock album born out of wanting to bend the rules and do what they want." Mojo, rating the project four stars, remarked, "The best Australian punk and post-punk always added a great twist to the Detroit archetype, and Chrome Dipped is no exception."

== Track listing ==
All tracks are written by Civic.

Chrome Dipped track listing
No.	Title	Length
1.	"The Fool"	2:49
2.	"Chrome Dipped"	3:22
3.	"Gulls Way"	4:49
4.	"The Hogg"	3:20
5.	"Starting All the Dogs Off"	4:35
6.	"Trick Pony"	4:35
7.	"Amissus"	2:55
8.	"Poison"	3:27
9.	"Fragrant Rice"	2:25
10.	"Kingdom Come"	2:45
11.	"Swing of the Noose"	2:16
Total length:		37:18

== Personnel ==
Credits adapted from the album's liner notes.

=== Civic ===
- Jim McCullough – vocals
- Lewis Hodgson – electric guitars, acoustic guitars, vocals
- Roland Hlavka – bass
- Eli Sthapit – drums

=== Additional contributors ===
- Kirin J Callinan – production, power tools, additional percussion, backing vocals on "Hogg"
- Chris Townend – recording, mixing
- Joe LaPorta – mastering
- Ezekiel Padmanabham – additional recording, editing, engineering assistance
- Matt Blach – additional recording, editing, engineering assistance, power tools, additional percussion
- Samuel Pankhurst – additional recording, editing, engineering assistance, power tools, additional percussion
- Tim Dunn – additional recording, editing, engineering assistance
- Charlotte Zarb – backing vocals on "Chrome Dipped"
- Tric – design
- Marcus Coblyn – photograph

== Charts ==
Chart performance for Chrome Dipped
Chart (2025)	Peak position
Australian Artist Albums (ARIA)	10
