= Confidence Man (band) =

Australian electropop band

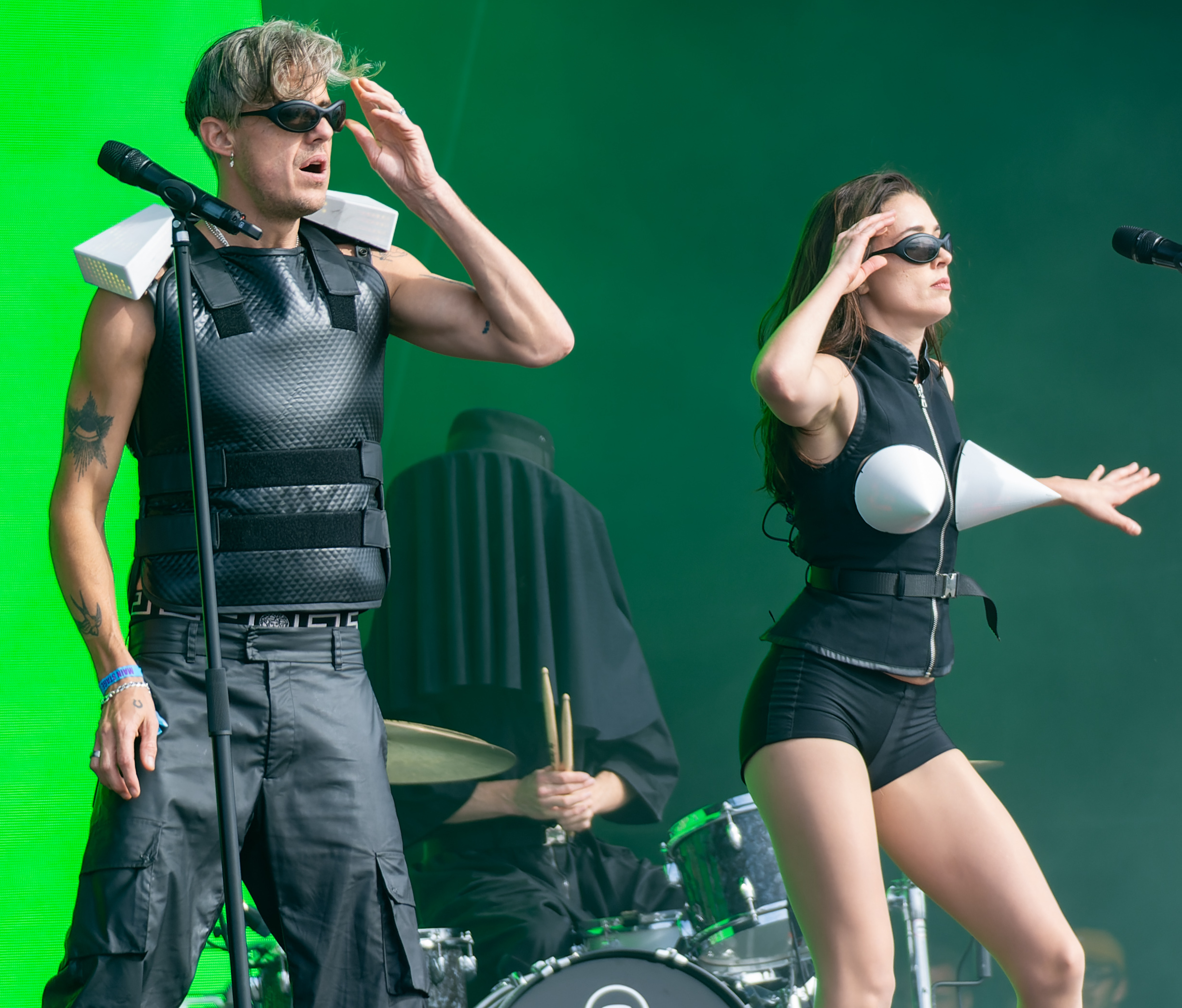
- Confidence Man performing at Boardmasters Festival in 2023

Background information
- Origin: Brisbane, Queensland, Australia
- Genres: Electropop; dance-pop; synth-pop; house
- Years active: 2016–present
- Labels: Heavenly; Amplifire; I Oh You; Polydor
- Members: Janet Planet (Grace Stephenson); Sugar Bones (Aidan Moore); Reggie Goodchild (Lewis Stephenson); Clarence McGuffie (currently unknown)
- Past members: Sam Hales; Lachlan McGeehan
- Website: www.confidenceman.com.au

Confidence Man (sometimes abbreviated as Con Man) are an Australian electropop band formed in 2016 in Brisbane, Queensland. The group consists of vocalists Janet Planet and Sugar Bones, alongside instrumentalists Clarence McGuffie and Reggie Goodchild who typically perform anonymously on stage. They released their debut album, Confident Music for Confident People, in 2018. Their second album, Tilt, was released in 2022, followed by their third album, 3AM (La La La), in 2024.

== Background ==
=== 2016–2022: Formation, Confident Music for Confident People and Tilt ===
The band was formed in 2016. The members had met on the Brisbane music scene, and had been in other bands including: The Belligerents, Moses Gunn Collective and The Jungle Giants, and use pseudonyms in Confidence Man; McGuffie and Goodchild reportedly took their stage names from tombstones. They started writing dance songs together, initially as a "kind of joke", but eventually realised the material was worth pursuing.

Planet and Bones provide vocals and dancing while Goodchild and McGuffie, who appear as masked figures, play keyboards and drums. The band signed to UK label Heavenly Records and released their debut UK single, "Bubblegum", in March 2017.

Confidence Man released their debut album, Confident Music for Confident People, on 13 April 2018. They toured Europe extensively in the middle of the same year, with festival slots and a sell-out at London's Scala before returning to Australia for dates in September.

The band released a Christmas single, "Santa's Coming Down the Chimney", in December 2018.

On 17 November 2019, Janet Planet and Sugar Bones were guests on Richard Kingsmill's '2019' programme on Triple J to premiere their new single "Does It Make You Feel Good?" During the interview, they revealed they have made celebrity friends with U2 and had been partying with them and Noel Gallagher while in Melbourne. They continued to explain their plans to feature The Edge playing tambourine on a future recording.

On 21 August 2020, Confidence Man released the non-album single, "First Class Bitch".

On 10 November 2021, the band announce the forthcoming release of their second studio album, Tilt and released "Holiday" as its lead single. Tilt was released on 1 April 2022 and peaked at number 7 on the ARIA charts. In late 2022, the band toured Australia, the United Kingdom and Europe, which also included a performance at Glastonbury Festival which received critical acclaim.

In September 2022, the band released a remix EP, titled Re-Tilt. The EP featured collaborations with Tame Impala, CHAI, Totally Enormous Extinct Dinosaurs and more.

=== 2023–present: 3AM (La La La) ===
In April 2023, Confidence Man released "On & On (Again)" with Daniel Avery. The single continued the shift from electro-pop towards a club-focused sound which had begun with Tilt, and marked their debut at new label home at Polydor. In July, the band released a collaboration with Swedish producer DJ Seinfeld on dance-pop record "Now U Do". Band member Sam Hales, who had initially been behind the pseudonym "Clarence McGuffie", stopped being credited on songs from this point forward; McGuffie's current identity is unknown.

In November 2023, after releasing several bootlegs and mashups through their SoundCloud page, the band released "Firebreak", and in February 2024, the band released a single in collaboration with DJ Boring, "Forever 2 (Crush Mix)". In May, Confidence Man released ConMan Club Classics Vol. 1, a compilation EP featuring the non-album singles and their remixes, including a new remix of "Boyfriend (Repeat)" by Cowboy Rhythmbox.

On 5 June 2024, the band announced their third album, 3AM (La La La), with the release of the single, "I Can't Lose You", along with a video of Planet and Bones singing the track in a helicopter naked over the London skyline. The album is inspired by the band's move to London, and by British rave culture of the 1990s.

In August 2024, Fabric Presents Confidence Man, a DJ mix by the band, was released. In April 2025, a remix album titled 5AM (La La La) was released.

In December 2025, the EP Active Scenes Vol. One will be released.

== Members ==
Current

- Janet Planet (Grace Stephenson) – vocals
- Sugar Bones (Aidan Moore) – vocals
- Reggie Goodchild (Lewis Stephenson) – production
- Clarence McGuffie (currently unknown)

Former

- Lachlan McGeehan
- Sam Hales – production

== Discography ==
=== Albums ===
List of albums, with selected chart positions
Title	Details	Peak chart positions				
Title	Details	AUS	SCO	UK	UK Dance	UK Indie
Confident Music for Confident People	Released: 13 April 2018; Label: Heavenly, Amplifire; Format: CD, vinyl, digital	31	—	—	13	30
Tilt	Released: 1 April 2022; Label: I Oh You; Format: CD, vinyl, digital	7	34	—	1	11
3AM (La La La)	Released: 18 October 2024; Label: I Oh You; Format: CD, cassette, vinyl, digital	40	4	9	1	—

=== Remix albums ===
List of remix albums, with selected details
Title	Details
5AM (La La La)	Released: 18 April 2025; Label: I Oh You; Format: Digital

=== DJ mixes ===
List of DJ mixes, with selected details
Title	Details
Fabric Presents Confidence Man	Released: 23 August 2024; Format: Digital; Label: Fabric Records

=== Extended plays ===
List of EPs, with selected details
Title	Details
Re-Tilt	Released: 30 September 2022; Format: Digital; Label: I Oh You
ConMan Club Classics Vol. 1	Released: 10 May 2024; Format: Digital; Label: Confidence Man
Active Scenes Vol. One	Released: 5 December 2025; Format: Digital; Label: Confidence Man
Active Scenes Vol. Two	Released: 20 November 2026; Format: Digital; Label: Confidence Man

=== Singles ===
Title	Year	Peak chart positions			Certification	Album
Title	Year	BEL (WA) Tip	NZ Hot	UK Phy.	Certification	Album
"Boyfriend (Repeat)"	2016	24	—	—		Confident Music for Confident People
"Bubblegum"	2017	—	—	—		Confident Music for Confident People
"Better Sit Down Boy"	2017	—	—	—		Confident Music for Confident People
"Don't You Know I'm in a Band"	2018	—	—	—		Confident Music for Confident People
"Out the Window"	2018	—	—	—		Confident Music for Confident People
"Try Your Luck"	2018	—	—	—		Confident Music for Confident People
"Santa's Comin' Down the Chimney"	2018	—	—	—		Non-album singles
"Does It Make You Feel Good?"	2019	—	—	—		Non-album singles
"First Class Bitch"	2020	—	—	13		Non-album singles
"Holiday"	2021	—	—	—		Tilt
"Feels Like a Different Thing"	2022	—	—	—		Tilt
"Woman"	2022	—	—	—		Tilt
"Luvin U Is Easy"	2022	—	—	—		Tilt
"Angry Girl" (CHAI Version)	2022	—	—	—		Re-Tilt
"Heaven" (triple j Like A Version)	2022	—	—	—		Non-album singles
"Toy Boy" (RAW SILK Remix)	2022	—	—	—		Non-album singles
"On & On (Again)" (with Daniel Avery)	2022	—	—	63		ConMan Club Classics Vol. 1
"Now U Do" (with DJ Seinfeld)	2023	—	—	26	BPI: Silver	ConMan Club Classics Vol. 1
"Chez Moi (Waiting for You)" (with CC:Disco)	2023	—	—	—		Non-album single
"Firebreak"	2023	—	—	—		ConMan Club Classics Vol. 1
"Forever 2 (Crush mix)" (with DJ Boring)	2024	—	—	—		ConMan Club Classics Vol. 1
"I Can't Lose You"	2024	—	—	—		3AM (La La La)
"Break It Down" (with In2stellar)	2024	—	—	—		Fabric Presents Confidence Man
"So What"	2024	—	—	—		3AM (La La La)
"Let Them Bells Ring"	2024	—	—	—		Fabric Presents Confidence Man
"All My People" (with Sweely)	2024	—	—	—		4AM (La La La)
"Control"	2024	—	—	—		3AM (La La La)
"Real Move Touch"	2024	—	—	—		3AM (La La La)
"I Heart You" (with Eliza Rose)	2025	—	—	—		4AM (La La La)
"Far Out" (Orbital remix)	2025	—	—	18		5AM (La La La)
"Re-Lush" (with Orbital)	2025	—	—	—		Brown Album (re-issue)
"Gossip" (with Jade)	2025	—	—	— (Note: "Gossip" did not enter the top 100 UK Singles Chart, but peaked at number 32 on the UK Singles Downloads Chart.)		Non-album single
"Brand New Me" (with Saint Etienne)	2025	—	—	— (Note: "Brand New Me" did not enter the top 100 UK Singles Chart, but peaked at number 5 on the UK Official Singles Sales Chart.)		International
"The Right" (with DJ Seinfeld)	2025	—	23	—		If This Is It (DJ Seinfeld album)
"Damaged Goods"	2025	—	—	—		Active Scenes Vol. One
"Young London"	2026	—	—	—		Active Scenes Vol. Two
"Higher" (with Spriitzz)	2026	—	—	—		
"Rhythm Is Dope" (with Ewan McVicar)	2026	—	—	—		Active Scenes Vol. Two

== Awards and nominations ==
=== AIR Awards ===
The Australian Independent Record Awards (commonly known informally as AIR Awards) is an annual awards night to recognise, promote and celebrate the success of Australia's Independent Music sector.

Year	Nominee / work	Award	Result	Ref.
2018	"Bubblegum"	Best Independent Dance/Electronic Club Song or EP	Nominated	
2019	themselves	Best Breakthrough Act	Nominated	
2019	Confident Music for Confident People	Best Independent Dance/Electronica Album	Won	
2020	"Does It Make You Feel Good?"	Best Independent Dance or Electronica Single	Nominated	
2022	"Holiday"	Best Independent Dance, Electronica or Club Single	Nominated	
2023	TILT	Best Independent Dance or Electronica Album or EP	Won	
2023	I OH YOU, Mushroom Marketing: Confidence Man – TILT	Independent Marketing Team of the Year	Won	
2023	Mushroom Publicity: Confidence Man – TILT	Independent Publicity Team of the Year	Nominated	
2024	"On & On (Again)"	Best Independent Dance, Electronica or Club Single	Nominated	
2025	3AM (La La La)	Best Independent Dance or Electronica Album or EP	Nominated	
2025	"I Can't Lose You"	Best Independent Dance, Electronica or Club Single	Nominated	
2025	I Oh You and Mushroom Music for 3AM (La La La)	Independent Marketing Team of the Year	Nominated	
2025	I Oh You and Mushroom Music for 3AM (La La La)	Independent Publicity Team of the Year	Nominated	
2026	"Gossip" (with Jade)	Best Independent Dance / Club Single	Nominated	

=== ARIA Music Awards ===
The ARIA Music Awards is an annual awards ceremony that recognises excellence, innovation, and achievement across all genres of Australian music. They commenced in 1987.

Year	Nominee / work	Award	Result	Ref.
2022	Tilt	Best Dance/Electronic Release	Nominated	
2024	"I Can't Lose You"	Best Dance/Electronic Release	Nominated	
2024	"I Can't Lose You" by Confidence Man, Zac Dov Wiesel	Best Video	Nominated	
2024	Confidence Man - Laneway Festival	Best Australian Live Act	Nominated	
2025	3AM (La La La)	Best Dance/Electronic Release	Nominated	
2025	3AM (La La La)	Best Independent Release	Nominated	
2025	3AM (La La La) Tour	Best Australian Live Act	Nominated	

=== BBC Radio 1 Dance Awards ===
Year	Nominee / work	Award	Result	Ref.
2025	Confidence Man	Best Breakthrough Artist	Won	

=== Brit Awards ===
The Brit Awards is a ceremony presented by British Phonographic Industry (BPI) to recognise the best in British and international music.

Year	Nominee / work	Award	Result	Ref.
2025	Confidence Man	International Group of the Year	Nominated	

=== J Awards ===
The J Awards are an annual series of Australian music awards that were established by the Australian Broadcasting Corporation's youth-focused radio station Triple J. They commenced in 2005.

Year	Nominee / work	Award	Result	Ref.
2017	Confidence Man	Unearthed Artist of the Year	Nominated	
2022	"Holiday" by Confidence Man (directed by W.A.M. Bleakley)	Australian Video of the Year	Nominated	
2024	Confidence Man	Australian Live Act of the Year	Nominated	

=== MTV Europe Music Awards ===
The MTV Europe Music Awards are an annual awards night celebrating music and pop culture. They commenced in 1994.

Year	Nominee / work	Award	Result	Ref.
2024	Confidence Man	Best Australian Act	Nominated	

=== Music Victoria Awards ===
The Music Victoria Awards are an annual awards night celebrating Victorian music. They commenced in 2006.

Year	Nominee / work	Award	Result	Ref.
2022	Confidence Man	Best Pop Work	Nominated	

=== National Live Music Awards ===
The National Live Music Awards (NLMAs) are a broad recognition of Australia's diverse live industry, celebrating the success of the Australian live scene. The awards commenced in 2016.

Year	Nominee / work	Award	Result
2017	Confidence Man	Best New Act of the Year	Nominated
2017	Confidence Man	Live Pop Act of the Year	Nominated
2017	Confidence Man	Best Live Act of the Year – People's Choice	Nominated
2018	Confidence Man	Live Pop Act of the Year	Won

=== Queensland Music Awards ===
The Queensland Music Awards (previously known as Q Song Awards) are annual awards celebrating Queensland, Australia's brightest emerging artists and established legends. They commenced in 2006.

Year	Nominee / work	Award	Result (wins only)
2017	"Boyfriend (Repeat)"	Electronic Song of the Year	Won
2019	themselves	Export Achievement Award	awarded

=== Rolling Stone Australia Awards ===
The Rolling Stone Australia Awards are awarded annually in January or February by the Australian edition of Rolling Stone magazine for outstanding contributions to popular culture in the previous year.

Year	Nominee / work	Award	Result	Ref.
2025	3AM (La La La)	Best LP/EP	Shortlisted	
2025	Confidence Man	Best Live Act	Shortlisted	
2025	Confidence Man	Rolling Stone Global Award	Shortlisted	

=== Rolling Stone UK Awards ===
The Rolling Stone UK Awards are annual awards celebrating music and events across the UK.

Year	Nominee / work	Award	Result
2024	Confidence Man	The Live Act Award	Won

=== UK Music Video Awards ===
The UK Music Video Awards are annual awards celebrating music videos from the UK music scene and abroad. They commenced in 2008.

Year	Nominee / work	Award	Result
2024	"I Can't Lose You"	Best Dance/Electronic Video - International	Nominated
2025	"Gossip" (featuring Jade)	Best Dance / Electronic Video – Newcomer	Nominated

== Performances and appearances ==
=== Headline tours ===
- The Boyfriend (repeat) Tour (2016)
- The Hard Candy Tour (2017)
- The Ring'A Ding Ding Tour (2017)
- Confident Music for Confident People World Tour (2018)
- Tilt Tour (2022)

=== Support tours ===
- Chairlift – Australian support act
- Noel Gallagher's High Flying Birds (2022)
- New Order (2023)
- Sofi Tukker (2024)
- All Points East (2025)

=== In popular culture ===
- FIFA 19 – "Out the Window"
- To All the Boys I've Loved Before – "Boyfriend"
- Television commercial for iPhone XS, released 2018 – "Catch My Breath"
- Australian television commercial for Hyundai Tucson, released July 2024 - "Don't You Know I'm in a Band"
- Trailer for the 2025 film Friendship (2024 film), released February 2024 - "Holiday"
