= Look at Me Now (Onefour album) =

Studio album by Onefour
- Released: 13 June 2025
- Length: 49:05
- Labels: Onefour; The Orchard
- Producers: Chandler Jewels; Omer Fedi; Onefour; Blake Slatkin; TM88

Singles from Look at Me Now
- 1. "Gang Ties" Released: 19 September 2024; 2. "Spinnin" Released: 15 November 2024; 3. "Movie" Released: 17 January 2025; 4. "Phone Call" Released: 14 February 2025; 5. "Family" Released: 11 April 2025; 6. "Luxford" Released: 16 May 2025; 7. "Distant Strangers" Released: 13 June 2025

Look at Me Now is the debut studio album by Australian drill and rap group, OneFour, released on 13 June 2025. The album debuted at number 2 on the ARIA Charts, and was nominated for several awards. The single "Spinnin'", featuring Nemzzz, won Most Performed Hip Hop/Rap Work in the APRA Music Awards of 2026.

== Release ==
Look at Me Now was announced in early April 2025 and released on 13 June 2025. Upon announcement, the group said "It's for those who want more, the ones who wake up and know they're destined for greatness, no matter what obstacles they face. It's a message of hope, a letter to the pain and a welcome to a better future that has no boundaries."

== Critical reception ==
Professional ratings
Review scores
Source	Rating
Rolling Stone Australia	3.5/5 stars
NME	3/5 stars

James Jennings from Rolling Stone Australia said "The quartet deliver a relentless set of gritty street tales over hard-hitting beats, with a few surprises in the mix (the Bob Marley-interpolating 'Phone Call'). A solid debut that will please OneFour's legion of fans."

Kyann-Sian Williams from NME said "Both vicious and introspective, this album won't knock you off your feet, but it's a gritty insight into OneFour's world, showcasing a raw potential that's still waiting for its moment to explode."

== Awards and nominations ==
At the 2025 ARIA Music Awards, the album was nominated for Best Hip Hop Release.

At the 2025 J Awards, the album was nominated for Australian Album of the Year.

Look At Me Now was nominated for Australia's richest music prize, the NSW Music Prize.

"Spinnin'", featuring Nemzzz, won Most Performed Hip Hop/Rap Work in the APRA Music Awards of 2026. The track was also nominated for ARIA Award for Song of the Year.

== Track listing ==
Look at Me Now track listing
No.	Title	Writer(s)	Length
1.	"Change" (featuring Potter Payper)	Spencer Magalogo; Jerome Misa; Dahcell Ramos; Salec Su'a; Jamel Bousbaa	4:06
2.	"Father's Day"	Magalogo; Misa	2:10
3.	"Luxford"	Magalogo; Misa; Ramos; Su'a	3:27
4.	"Gang Ties" (featuring Headie One)	Magalogo; Misa; Su'a; Irving Adjei; Kelvin Tang	3:00
5.	"DND (Realest)"	Misa; Ramos; Su'a	2:59
6.	"Distant Strangers" (featuring The Kid Laroi and Imogen Heap)	Magalogo; Misa; Ramos; Su'a; Omer Fedi; Charlton Howard; Bryan Simmons; Blake Slatkin	2:45
7.	"Phone Call" (featuring Mabel)	Magalogo; Misa; Vincent Goodyer; Jordan Henry; Bob Marley; Mabel McVey; Chelsea Warner	3:09
8.	"Bricks & Mortar" (featuring K-Trap)	Magalogo; Misa; Su'a	3:13
9.	"Movie" (featuring Abra Cadabra)	Magalogo; Misa; Su'a; Chandler Hammond; Severin Krohz; Nelson Nasir; Tang; Moritz Wagner; Brian Watters	3:32
10.	"Blood in My Eyes" (featuring CG)	Misa; Su'a	2:46
11.	"Boss"	Magalogo; Misa; Su'a	3:08
12.	"Family"	Magalogo; Misa; Ramos; Su'a	3:05
13.	"Look at Me Now"	Magalogo; Misa; Ramos; Su'a	3:18
14.	"Conditioned"	Magalogo; Misa; Su'a; Hugo Hui; David Ifopo; Louis Oblin; Badibake-Dolvani Ngavandje; Bailey Pickles	3:00
15.	"Spinnin'" (featuring Nemzzz)	Magalogo; Misa; Su'a; Nemiah Simms; Tang; Robin Turrini	2:41
16.	"Spinnin'" (featuring Nemzzz; Segway remix)	Magalogo; Misa; Su'a; Segway; Simms; Tang; Turrini	2:42
Total length:			49:05

== Personnel ==
Credits adapted from Tidal.

=== Onefour ===
- Dahcell "Celly" Ramos – vocals (1, 3, 5, 6, 12, 13), production (1–5, 7–13, 15, 16)
- Jerome "J Emz" Misa – vocals (all tracks), production (1–5, 7–13, 15, 16)
- Salec "Lekks" Su'a – vocals (1, 3–6, 8, 10, 11–16), production (1–5, 7–13, 15, 16)
- Spencer "Spenny" Magalogo – vocals (1–9, 11–14), production (1–5, 7–13, 15, 16)

=== Additional contributors ===
- Leandro Hidalgo – mixing, mastering
- Blake Slatkin – production (6)
- Omer Fedi – production (6)
- TM88 – production (6)
- Chandler Jewels – production (14)
- Potter Payper – vocals (1)
- Bailey Pickles – piano (1, 14)
- Hugo Hui – violin (1, 14)
- Headie One – vocals (4)
- Imogen Heap – vocals (6)
- The Kid Laroi – vocals (6)
- Mabel – vocals (7)
- K-Trap – vocals (8)
- Abra Cadabra – vocals (9)
- CG – vocals (10)
- Hylton Mowday – arrangement (11)
- Freya Schack-Arnott – cello (11)
- Beth Condon – violin (11)
- Judy Farr-Jones – violin (11)
- Larissa Liley – background vocals (14)
- Tagalima Misa – vocals (14)
- Nemzzz – vocals (15, 16)

== Charts ==
Weekly chart performance for Look at Me Now
Chart (2025)	Peak position
Australian Albums (ARIA)	2
New Zealand Albums (RMNZ)	29

Year-end chart performance for Look at Me Now
Chart (2025)	Position
Australian Artist Albums (ARIA)	19
