= Bodies (Thornhill album) =

Studio album by Thornhill
- Released: 4 April 2025
- Recorded: 2023–2024
- Genres: Nu metalcore; alternative metal; progressive metalcore
- Length: 37:24
- Label: UNFD
- Producer: Sam Bassal

Thornhill chronology
Heroine (2022)	Bodies (2025)

Singles from Bodies
- 1. "Obsession" Released: 29 February 2024; 2. "Nerv" Released: 21 November 2024; 3. "Silver Swarm" Released: 30 January 2025; 4. "Tongues" Released: 6 March 2025

Singles from Bodies X
- 1. "Mercia" Released: 17 September 2025

Bodies is the third studio album by Australian alternative metal band Thornhill. It was released on 4 April 2025 through UNFD. It includes the singles "Obsession", "Nerv", "Silver Swarm" and "Tongues". Bodies is the first Thornhill album not to feature guitarist Matt van Duppen, who left the band in 2023.

On 17 September 2025, the band released the single "Mercia" with an accompanying music video. This was later announced to be on the remix album Bodies X.

At the 2025 ARIA Music Awards, the album won ARIA Award for Best Hard Rock or Heavy Metal Album. At the 2025 J Awards, the album was nominated for Australian Album of the Year. At the AIR Awards of 2026, it won Best Independent Heavy Album or EP.

== Release and promotion ==
On 29 February 2024, the band released the first single from Bodies, titled "Obsession", and on 21 November 2024, the band released another single titled "Nerv".

On 30 January 2025, the group announced their third studio album, Bodies, scheduled for release on 4 April 2025. The announcement was accompanied by the single "Silver Swarm". The band released one more single from the album, "Tongues" on March 6. Bodies was released on April 4 to positive reviews.

== Touring ==
Thornhill played a three-date Australian tour playing the album in full, starting in Melbourne on 27 March and ending in Sydney on 30 March. On April 11, Thornhill embarked on their North American headline tour.

They were scheduled to directly support Landmvrks on their North America headline tour. Later that year, Thornhill announced they were dropping off the tour, stating that "an unexpected opportunity has come up for North America". They were soon replaced by Novelists. Thornhill were then announced as tour support for Sleep Token's Even in Arcadia North America tour.

== Bodies X ==
Before the tour began, Thornhill released a new single titled "Mercia" along with a cinematic music video. This single was later revealed to be from Bodies X, a remix album of Bodies, featuring artists such as vianova, Northlane, Zetra and Landon Tewers of The Plot in You. The band described the album as "a remix record where each track is reimagined by one of our friends or creatives that we admire".

== Track listing ==
All tracks are written by Thornhill.

Bodies track listing
No.	Title	Length
1.	"DIESEL"	2:10
2.	"Revolver"	4:14
3.	"Silver Swarm"	4:33
4.	"Only Ever You"	4:14
5.	"fall into the wind"	1:32
6.	"TONGUES"	2:51
7.	"nerv"	3:12
8.	"Obsession"	3:17
9.	"CRUSH"	3:11
10.	"under the knife"	3:58
11.	"For Now"	4:05
Total length:		37:24

Bodies X track listing
No.	Title	Length
1.	"Mercia"	5:34
2.	"DIESEL (vianova remix)"	3:25
3.	"Revolver (Landon Tewers remix)"	3:06
4.	"Silver Swarm (Kel Pinchin remix)"	3:13
5.	"Only Ever You (VICIOUS remix)"	4:33
6.	"fall into the wind (mondo loops remix)"	2:18
7.	"TONGUES (Daybreak remix)"	3:50
8.	"nerv (Running Touch remix)"	2:48
9.	"Obsession (Alejandro Aranda remix)"	3:18
10.	"CRUSH (Northlane remix)"	3:05
11.	"under the knife (Zetra remix)"	4:53
12.	"For Now (James McKendrick remix)"	4:53
Total length:		44:56

== Charts ==
Weekly chart performance for Bodies
Chart (2025)	Peak position
Australian Albums (ARIA)	4
United Kingdom download Albums (OCC)	48

Year-end chart performance for Bodies
Chart (2025)	Position
Australian Artist Albums (ARIA)	27
