= Now Would Be a Good Time =

Studio album by Folk Bitch Trio
- Released: 25 July 2025
- Genres: Indie folk; indie rock
- Length: 39:03
- Label: Jagjaguwar

Professional ratings
Aggregate scores
Source	Rating
Metacritic	85/100
Review scores
Source	Rating
AllMusic	4.5/5 stars
Clash	8/10
DIY	3/5 stars
Mojo	4/5 stars
NME	5/5 stars
Tom Hull – on the Web	B
Uncut	8/10
Under the Radar	7/10

Now Would Be a Good Time is the debut studio album by Folk Bitch Trio. Alongside the album announcement, the trio released the single "Cathode Ray". The album was released on 25 July 2025 via Jagjaguwar.

At the 2025 ARIA Music Awards, the album was nominated for Best Group, Michael Gudinski Breakthrough Artist, Best Adult Contemporary Album, Best Independent Release.

The album was nominated for the 2025 Australian Music Prize. At the 2025 J Awards, the album was nominated for Australian Album of the Year.

At the AIR Awards of 2026, it was nominated for Independent Album of the Year, Best Independent Blues and Roots Album or EP while Secretly Group were nominated for Independent Marketing Team of the Year and Twnty Three for Independent Publicity Team of the Year. It won Best Independent Blues and Roots Album or EP.

== Track listing ==
All songs written by Gracie Sinclair, Jeanie Pilkington, and Heide Peverelle, except "I'll Find a Way (To Carry It All)," by Ted Lucas.

Now Would Be a Good Time track listing
No.	Title	Length
1.	"God's a Different Sword"	3:19
2.	"Hotel TV"	4:37
3.	"The Actor"	2:50
4.	"Moth Song"	5:03
5.	"I'll Find a Way (To Carry It All)"	2:22
6.	"Cathode Ray"	4:09
7.	"Foreign Bird"	4:12
8.	"That's All She Wrote"	4:06
9.	"Sarah"	4:20
10.	"Mary's Playing the Harp"	4:05
Total length:		39:03

== Charts ==
Chart performance for Now Would Be a Good Time
Chart (2025)	Peak position
Australian Albums (ARIA)	19
French Rock & Metal Albums (SNEP)	60
New Zealand Albums (RMNZ)	34
UK Independent Albums (Official Charts)	49
