= Confident Music for Confident People =

Studio album by Confidence Man
- Released: 13 April 2018
- Genre: Dance-pop
- Length: 41:07
- Label: Heavenly Records, Amplifire Music
- Producer: Confidence Man

Confidence Man chronology
Confident Music for Confident People (2018)	Tilt (2022)

Singles from Confident Music for Confident People
- 1. "Boyfriend (Repeat)" Released: 12 August 2016; 2. "Bubblegum" Released: 27 February 2017; 3. "Better Sit Down Boy" Released: 15 September 2017; 4. "Don't You Know I'm in a Band" Released: 20 February 2018; 5. "Out the Window" Released: 30 April 2018; 6. "Try Your Luck" Released: 3 August 2018

Confident Music for Confident People is the debut studio album by Australian electro pop band, Confidence Man. It was released on 13 April 2018 and peaked at number 31 on the ARIA Charts. The album was written and produced by the band and was supported with an Australian and international tour that ran from February to August 2018. At the AIR Awards of 2019, it won Best Independent Dance/Electronica Album.

== Reception ==
Professional ratings
Aggregate scores
Source	Rating
Metacritic	80/100
Review scores
Source	Rating
AllMusic	4/5 stars
The AU Review	6.5/10
Drowned in Sound	9/10
The Guardian	4/5 stars
NME	4/5 stars

On Metacritic, the album scored an 80/100 from 6 reviews which the website regards as being "generally favourable reviews".

Neil Z. Yeung from AllMusic said "The party doesn't stop on Confidence Man's irrepressibly upbeat debut. The Australian quartet do not relent over the course of 11 pulsating dance anthems, infusing each one with a heavy dose of campy, tongue-in-cheek fun like predecessors Scissor Sisters, Fischerspooner, LCD Soundsystem, and CSS." adding "They focus on addictive rhythms, pulsing beats and deceptively simple lyrical ear-worms, hypnotising like raving snake-charmers".

Dylan Marshall from The AU Review said "Having seen the band three times already, I wasn't expecting a heap from Confident Music for Confident People. As long as the tracks were going to be able to translate to a live setting, then Confidence Man had done their job. Listening to the band in a recorded format, you realise that they're essentially a satire on pop music and your ego-maniacal pop and dance acts. Sure they may be taking the piss, but I'd much rather they do it ironically than think they're actually going to change the face of the pop and dance worlds. Confident Music for Confident People is exactly that. It was never going to be ground-breaking, but it is fun and confident and frankly, there's nothing wrong with that."

Dom Gourlay from Drowned in Sound called it "the most unashamedly addictive record you'll hear all year."

Rachel Aroesti from The Guardian "The thing that first wallops you over the head about their wacky debut is front woman Janet Planet's chatty, bratty vocal, which covers topics ranging from the lameness of her boyfriend to how quickly other men fall in love with her." Aroesti concluded saying, "They certainly aren't subtle, but Confidence Man's broad brush strokes belie a sophisticated and skilful distillation of dance-pop joy."

Andrew Trendell from NME said "It's a sound somewhere between the synth-andcowbell-driven electro-punk abandon of early LCD Soundsystem and Le Tigre, elevated by a sense of Beck's genre-remixing spirit and Hot Chip's knack for a hook, drenched in the sweet psych glaze of Jagwar Ma." Trendell continued saying "With a balearic pulse and horizontal attitude throughout, this record is ready-made sunshine – MDMAzing pretension-free fun for the masses."

Triple J said "Popping with effortless cool, playful braggadocios and sparkling sass, Confident Music for Confident People is 11 tracks of irresistible dance music."

== Track listing ==
1. "Try Your Luck" - 3:34
2. "Don't You Know I'm in a Band" - 3:24
3. "Boyfriend (Repeat)" - 4:10
4. "C.O.O.L Party" - 3:39
5. "Out the Window" - 4:25
6. "Catch My Breath" - 3:59
7. "Bubblegum" - 3:29
8. "Better Sit Down Boy" - 3:24
9. "Sailboat Vacation" - 2:33
10. "All the Way" - 3:43
11. "Fascination" - 4:53

== Chart ==
Chart performance for Confident Music for Confident People
Chart (2018)	Peak position
Australian Albums (ARIA)	31
