= NSW Music Prize =

Australian state music awards

- Country: Australia
- First award: 2025; 1 year ago

Highlights
- Most wins: Ninajirachi (2 wins)
- Website: Official website

The NSW Music Prize is a prize awarded by Sound NSW, a part of the Government of New South Wales, Australia, which aims to "celebrate, support and incentivise" the state's most talented musicians. The awards commenced in 2025 with a $160,000 prize pool split across three categories.

== 2025 prizes ==
The eligibility period for 2025 NSW Music Prize was music releases from 1 July 2024 to 30 June 2025. The nominations were revealed on 27 October 2025. The winners were announced on 24 November 2025 at the Museum of Contemporary Art Australia.

Award	Nominee/ Winner	Result
NSW Music Prize ($80,000)	Only One Mode by Speed	Won
NSW Music Prize ($80,000)	Kill the Dead by 3%	Nominated
NSW Music Prize ($80,000)	Big Tidda by Barkaa	Nominated
NSW Music Prize ($80,000)	Chapter 26 by Kobie Dee	Nominated
NSW Music Prize ($80,000)	girl EDM by Ninajirachi	Nominated
NSW Music Prize ($80,000)	Look At Me Now by Onefour	Nominated
NSW Music Prize ($80,000)	Crime in Australia by Party Dozen	Nominated
NSW Music Prize ($80,000)	Inhale/Exhale by Rüfüs Du Sol	Nominated
NSW Music Prize ($80,000)	Trek by Shady Nasty	Nominated
NSW Music Prize ($80,000)	Varvie World by Vv Pete & Utility	Nominated
NSW First Nations Music Prize ($40,000)	Big Tidda by Barkaa	Won
NSW First Nations Music Prize ($40,000)	Kill the Dead by 3%	Nominated
NSW First Nations Music Prize ($40,000)	Did I Stutter? by Djanaba	Nominated
NSW First Nations Music Prize ($40,000)	Crossroads by Stiff Gins	Nominated
NSW First Nations Music Prize ($40,000)	Human? by Ziggy Ramo	Nominated
NSW Breakthrough Artist of the Year ($40,000)	Ninajirachi	Won
NSW Breakthrough Artist of the Year ($40,000)	Don West	Nominated
NSW Breakthrough Artist of the Year ($40,000)	Royel Otis	Nominated
NSW Breakthrough Artist of the Year ($40,000)	Shady Nasty	Nominated
NSW Breakthrough Artist of the Year ($40,000)	Speed	Nominated

== 2026 prizes ==
The nominations for the 2026 were revealed in October and the winners were announced on 9 November 2026.

Award	Nominee/ Winner	Result
NSW Music Prize ($80,000)	I Love My Computer by Ninajirachi	Won
NSW Music Prize ($80,000)	All My Angels by Speed	Nominated
NSW Music Prize ($80,000)	Capital Fiction by Keli Holiday	Nominated
NSW Music Prize ($80,000)	Everything Every Single Day by The Rions	Nominated
NSW Music Prize ($80,000)	Give Me All Your Love by Don West	Nominated
NSW Music Prize ($80,000)	Goodbye (If You Call That Gone) by May-a	Nominated
NSW Music Prize ($80,000)	Loved by Parcels	Nominated
NSW Music Prize ($80,000)	Naungu Urui by Zipporah	Nominated
NSW Music Prize ($80,000)	Soulstar by Boy Soda	Nominated
NSW Music Prize ($80,000)	What Makes a Girl a Girl by Esha Tewari	Nominated
NSW First Nations Music Prize ($40,000)	"These Days", "Running Through My Head" & "Our Greats" by 3%	Won
NSW First Nations Music Prize ($40,000)	Lost Soul Love Letters by Kyarna	Nominated
NSW First Nations Music Prize ($40,000)	Blah Blah about the Blah by Rox Lavi	Nominated
NSW First Nations Music Prize ($40,000)	Everything That Hurts Is Human by Them	Nominated
NSW First Nations Music Prize ($40,000)	Glimmers Continued by Velvet Trip	Nominated
NSW Breakthrough Artist of the Year ($40,000)	Boy Soda	Won
NSW Breakthrough Artist of the Year ($40,000)	Esha Tewari	Nominated
NSW Breakthrough Artist of the Year ($40,000)	Keli Holiday	Nominated
NSW Breakthrough Artist of the Year ($40,000)	Rageflower	Nominated
NSW Breakthrough Artist of the Year ($40,000)	Velvet Trip	Nominated
