= Nicky Winmar =

Australian rules footballer (born 1965)

- Winmar points proudly at his skin in a gesture of defiance at racial abuse in 1993

Personal information
- Full name: Neil Elvis Winmar
- Nickname: "Cuz"
- Born: 25 September 1965 (age 61); Kellerberrin, Western Australia
- Original team: Pingelly (UGSFL)
- Height: 183 cm (6 ft 0 in)
- Weight: 81 kg (179 lb)
- Positions: Half-forward flank, wing

Playing career^{1}
| Years | Club | Games (Goals) |
| 1983–1986 | South Fremantle | 90 (98) |
| 1987–1998 | St Kilda | 230 (283) |
| 1999 | Western Bulldogs | 21 (34) |
| Total | | 341 (415) |

Representative team honours
| Years | Team | Games (Goals) |
| 1988–97 | Western Australia | 8 (10) |
- ^{1} Playing statistics correct to the end of 1999.

Career highlights
- St Kilda leading Goalkicker 1988; 2x St Kilda Best and Fairest 1989, 1995; VFL Team of the Year 1989; 2x All-Australian team 1991, 1995; Mark of the Year 1992; St Kilda Pre-Season Premiership side 1996; Michael Tuck Medal 1996; Aboriginal Sportsperson of the Year 1999; St Kilda Team of the Century (named 2003); St Kilda Hall of Fame membership (inducted 2003, membership revoked in 2026); Indigenous Team of the Century (named 2005); West Australian Football Hall of Fame (inducted 2009); Australian Football Hall of Fame (inducted 2022, membership revoked in 2026)

Neil Elvis "Nicky" Winmar (born 25 September 1965) is a former Australian rules footballer best known for his career for St Kilda and the Western Bulldogs in the Australian Football League (AFL), as well as South Fremantle in the West Australian Football League (WAFL).

A Noongar man from the Wheatbelt region of Western Australia, he was the first Aboriginal footballer to play 200 games in the AFL, and was named on the half-forward flank in the Indigenous Team of the Century in 2005. Winmar began his career with South Fremantle, playing 58 games at the club before being recruited prior to the 1987 season by St Kilda. In a twelve-season career with St Kilda, Winmar won the club's best and fairest award, the Trevor Barker Award in 1989 and 1995, and was also twice named in the All-Australian team.

Like many other Aboriginal footballers, Winmar was subjected to racial abuse during his career. Following a 1993 match, Winmar famously responded to racist heckling from opposition fans by lifting his guernsey and pointing to his skin―a moment captured in a photograph that quickly became a symbol of Aboriginal pride and is widely regarded as a catalyst for the AFL's efforts to address racism within the game. Described as one of the most memorable images in Australian sporting history, it has had a lasting impact on Australian sporting culture.

Winmar left St Kilda at the end of the 1998 season and was drafted by the Western Bulldogs, playing one further season in the AFL before retiring at the end of the 1999 season. Having represented Western Australia in eight interstate matches, Winmar was named in St Kilda's Team of the Century in 2003 and was inducted into the West Australian Football Hall of Fame in 2009. Winmar was also part of the Australian Football Hall of Fame from 2022 to 2026, before being removed after being convicted of assaulting a woman in 2026. His status in the St Kilda Hall of Fame is currently suspended.

== Early life ==
Neil Elvis Winmar was born on 25 September 1965 in Kellerberrin, Western Australia, to Neal and Meryle Winmar. Both his parents were Noongar. His father, Neal Winmar, was born in a tent under a tree. Nicky grew up on an Aboriginal reserve in Western Australia's Wheatbelt, near the town of Pingelly, in a windowless shack made of corrugated iron with a dirt floor, no running water or sewerage. The reserve had a 6pm curfew. Winmar left school by the age of 15, and worked as a shearer.

== Early career ==
Winmar played for the Brookton/Pingelly Football Club in the Upper Great Southern Football League (UGSFL) from an early age. Aged 15, he won a senior best and fairest in an A-grade local competition.

He was subsequently recruited by South Fremantle in the Perth-based WAFL, after the club's coach at the time, Mal Brown, saw Winmar playing for Brookton/Pingelly. He made his senior debut for South Fremantle in round nine of the 1983 season, aged 17, and played a total of 13 games in his debut season. In the beginning, he was used across the wings and half-forward flanks, but was later played as a rover, although he remained a regular goal-kicker. In total, Winmar played 58 games for South Fremantle from 1983 to 1986 and kicked 98 goals.

== VFL/AFL career ==
Winmar became known as "Cuz", as it was his habit to address everyone by this word.

=== St Kilda ===
Winmar transferred to the St Kilda Football Club in the Victorian Football League (VFL) for the 1987 season, making his debut for the club in Round 1 against Geelong at Moorabbin Oval. Having played 20 games in his debut season and kicking 37 goals, Winmar finished second in the club's best and fairest count behind Tony Lockett (who went on to win the Brownlow) and also polled 10 votes in the Brownlow Medal. In 1988, he kicked 43 goals from 21 games to be the club's leading goalkicker and again finished runner-up in the best and fairest count, this time to Danny Frawley. After an outstanding season in 1989, Winmar won St Kilda's best and fairest award and was also named in the VFL's Team of the Year on a half-forward flank. He also finished equal third in the 1989 Brownlow Medal, polling 16 votes from his 22 games.

After a match against Hawthorn in Round 19 of the 1990 season, Winmar was suspended for 10 matches for kicking and eye-gouging Dermott Brereton. Brereton later apologised to Winmar for racially abusing him during the game. He returned to football in round seven of the 1991 season, recording 33 disposals and one goal against Adelaide at Moorabbin. Winmar's performances throughout the rest of the season led to him being named in the inaugural AFL All-Australian team. Winmar played a further 23 games in the 1992 season, including the club's semi-final loss to Footscray. At the conclusion of the season, Winmar was named the winner of the Mark of the Year competition, for a spectacular mark taken at Subiaco Oval against West Coast. In round four of the 1993 season, Indigenous players Winmar and Gilbert McAdam were racially abused by Collingwood supporters, eventually being awarded two and three Brownlow Medal votes in a game St Kilda won by 22 points. The week after the game, Winmar was involved in a dispute with St Kilda over his level of pay, in particular, injury payments, and did not play for the next two weeks.

Playing a total of 17 games in 1994, Winmar missed three weeks late in the season after being suspended for striking. At the end of the season, Winmar was also refused clearance by St Kilda to play in the Aboriginal All-Stars game, held at Marrara Oval in Darwin. In 1995, Winmar played in each of St Kilda's 22 games, winning the club's best and fairest award for a second time and also being named in the All-Australian team. In the pre-season competition held prior to the start of the 1996 season, the 1996 Ansett Australia Cup, Winmar played in St Kilda's team which defeated Carlton by 58 points in the grand final held at Waverley Park and was awarded the Michael Tuck Medal as best on ground. Having damaged the medial collateral ligament of his knee in the round three game against Melbourne, Winmar missed nine matches in the early part of the 1996 season before returning in the latter part of the season. Winmar played his 200th game for the club in round 17 of the 1997 season, against the Brisbane Lions at Waverley Park, becoming the first Indigenous player to reach the milestone in the AFL. He also played in St Kilda's loss to Adelaide in the 1997 Grand Final, having kicked three goals against North Melbourne in the preliminary final the previous week.

Tribunal record
| Year | Charge | Penalty |
|---|---|---|
| 1988 | Striking | No penalty |
| 1990 | Charging | No penalty |
| 1990 | Kicking, eye-gouging | Suspended ten matches |
| 1992 | Charging | No penalty |
| 1994 | Striking | Suspended three matches |
| 1994 | Striking | No penalty |
| 1995 | Disputing umpire's decision | Fined A$1,500 |

In 1998, in what was to be his last season for St Kilda, Winmar played 23 games and kicked 16 goals. He was heavily criticised during the club's match against Carlton in Round 20 after spending much of the game fighting with opponents, finishing with only eight disposals. Winmar was suspended by the club for the following match but returned to play for the club in the finals series. After the match, Winmar's manager, Peter Jess, was criticised for making comments in an interview with radio station 3AW suggesting that Aboriginal players were unable to cope with the pressures introduced by "white society".

=== Western Bulldogs ===
Winmar was dismissed from St Kilda at the end of the 1998 season after Tim Watson replaced Stan Alves as coach of the club. Despite being contracted for another year, the club terminated Winmar's contract as a result of his behaviour and lack of discipline over the previous season. He was then selected by the Western Bulldogs with the 30th pick overall in the 1998 National Draft, having been considered a chance to be drafted by Collingwood, North Melbourne or Carlton. Winmar played a total of 21 games for the club, kicking 34 goals, before retiring from the Western Bulldogs at the end of the 1999 season, halfway through a two-year contract, citing issues with a commitment to training and injuries. Winmar was named National Aboriginal Sportsman of the Year at the National Aboriginal and Torres Strait Islander Sports Awards held in Hobart, Tasmania, sharing the award with rugby league player Cliff Lyons.

== Racial vilification and 'Winmar's stand' ==
During his career, Winmar was subjected to racial abuse by opposition players, staff and fans. The most infamous incident occurred during Round 4 of the 1993 season, when St Kilda played Collingwood at the latter club's home ground of Victoria Park. Members of the Collingwood cheer squad taunted Winmar throughout the match, telling him to "go and sniff some petrol" and "go walkabout where you came from". At the conclusion of the game, which St Kilda won by 22 points with Winmar putting in a best-on-ground performance, he lifted up his jumper and, facing the crowd, pointed to his skin (controversially using his middle finger instead of his index finger to make the gesture). The following day, photographs of 'Winmar's stand', taken from different angles by Wayne Ludbey and John Feder, were published in the Sunday Age under the headline "Winmar: I'm black and proud of it", with the Sunday Herald Sun publishing a similar photograph under the caption "I've got guts".

Winmar was unaware that his gesture had been photographed until the following day, and disliked the attention it brought him. He said years later: "After my incident, I walked away from the game for about four or five weeks. I didn't want to come back". Winmar's stand ignited a national discussion about racism in sport and helped encourage other Aboriginal players to report racial abuse. In 1995, after Aboriginal player Michael Long made a complaint against Collingwood's Damian Monkhorst for racial abuse, the AFL amended its code to combat racial and religious vilification, with offending clubs liable for fines of up to $50,000.

Winmar's gesture, described as a "powerful statement", an "anti-racist symbol", and one of the "most poignant" images in Australian sport, has been credited as a catalyst for the movement against racism in Australian football, and has been compared to the black power salute performed by American athletes at the 1968 Summer Olympics in terms of impact. It has been described as one of the most memorable images in Australian sporting history.

On 16 April 2023, at the Round 5 St Kilda–Collingwood game, thirty years since Winmar's stand, he was celebrated as he tossed the coin before the opening bounce. Before the game, Collingwood formally apologised to Winmar and Aboriginal teammate Gilbert McAdam, who had also been racially abused at the 1993 game.

=== Cultural impact ===
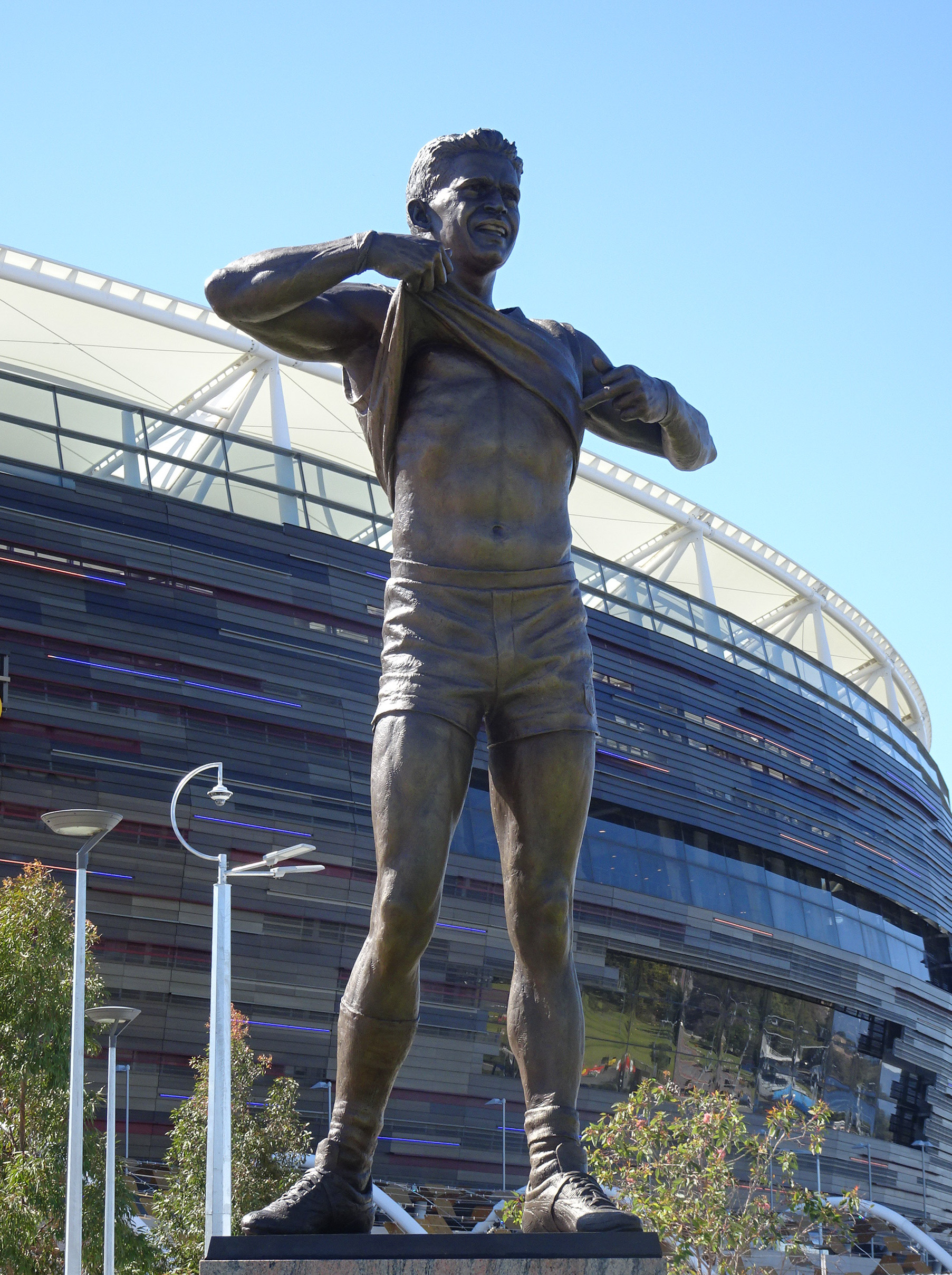
Statue of Winmar's stand, erected outside Perth Stadium in 2019 and removed in 2026

Over the years, a number of Indigenous footballers have reenacted Winmar's stand during games, including Jamarra Ugle-Hagan of the Western Bulldogs and NRL player Josh Addo-Carr.

Winmar's stand has inspired songs by Indigenous artists, including "Colour of Your Jumper" (1993) by singer-songwriter Archie Roach and the 2018 single "Black Magic" by rapper Baker Boy. Indigenous hip hop trio 3% released the album Kill the Dead in 2024, the cover art of which is a painting of Winmar's stand. The work was completed by Daniel Boyd.

The photograph is reproduced in The Game That Made Australia, a mural painted by Jamie Cooper and commissioned by the AFL in 2008 to celebrate the 150th anniversary of the origins of Australian rules football.

Tony Albert included a watercolour of the photograph in a collage titled Once upon a time, winner of the 2014 Basil Sellers Art Prize.

Rona Panangka Rubuntja, a member of the Hermannsburg Potters, depicted Winmar's stand in a vase, now held at the National Gallery of Victoria.

In July 2019, a 2.75-metre (9 ft 0 in) bronze statue of Winmar's stand was unveiled outside Perth Stadium. However, the statue was removed by the Western Australian government in the early hours of July 5 2026 following Winmar's assault conviction in July 2026.

Vincent Namatjira has explored Winmar's stand, including in portraits of Winmar himself, as well as his 2020 Archibald Prize-winning portrait of footballer Adam Goodes, Stand Strong for Who You Are, in which Goodes is shown replicating the gesture.

=== Jumper ===
Winmar donated the jumper he was wearing in the photograph to the Aboriginal and Torres Strait Islander Commission (ATSIC) in 1998. Prior to the commission's disbanding in 2005, Geoff Clark, the chairman of ATSIC at the time, removed the framed jumper from the commission's offices in Canberra to his home in Warrnambool, Victoria. Clark was forced to return the jumper to Winmar, which was later donated to the National Museum of Australia, where it featured in Off the Walls, an exhibit of Indigenous Australian art. In May 2012, the jumper was auctioned by Sotheby's, but was passed in after the bidding reached A$95,000. In September of the same year, Museum Victoria purchased the jumper for $100,000, with the intention to display it at the First Peoples exhibition at Melbourne Museum in July 2013. The authenticity of the jumper has been questioned, with the St Kilda Football Club publishing a statement in March 2005 suggesting that the jumper given to ATSIC may not have been the actual jumper worn during the game, citing differences between sponsors' logos present on the jumper. Similar questions were raised prior to the jumper's auction in 2012.

== Recognition and honours ==
Brownlow Medal votes
| Season | Votes |
| 1987 | 10 |
| 1988 | 8 |
| 1989 | 16 |
| 1990 | 1 |
| 1991 | 11 |
| 1992 | 8 |
| 1993 | 5 |
| 1994 | 5 |
| 1995 | 10 |
| 1996 | 1 |
| 1997 | 3 |
| 1998 | 0 |
| 1999 | 4 |
| Total | 82 |

A tournament for under-age Indigenous footballers, the Nicky Winmar Cup, has been contested since 2009 as a joint venture between the West Australian Football Commission and the Western Australian Department of Sport and Recreation, sponsored by Alinta, an energy company.

=== Team ===
- Pre-Season Cup (St Kilda): 1996

=== Individual ===
- All-Australian: 1991, 1995
- Herald Sun Player of the Year Award: 1995
- Trevor Barker Award (St Kilda F.C. Best & Fairest): 1989, 1995
- St Kilda F.C. Leading Goalkicker: 1988
- Alex Jesaulenko Medal (Mark of the Year Award): 1992
- Michael Tuck Medal: 1996
- Aboriginal Sportsperson of the Year: 1999
- St Kilda F.C. Team of the Century – right wing (announced 2003)
- St Kilda F.C. Hall of Fame Inductee: 2003
- West Australian Football Hall of Fame Inductee: 2009
- South Fremantle's Indigenous Team of the Century (announced 2009)
- Indigenous Team of the Century – half-forward flank (announced 2005)
- AFL Hall of Fame: June 2022, membership revoked in 2026

Winmar was removed from the Hall of Fame on 15 July 2026.

== Later life and criminal history ==
Following his retirement from the AFL, Winmar played with various clubs in regional and country leagues in Victoria and the Northern Territory, including for the Palmerston Football Club in the Northern Territory Football League; for the Warburton and Seville Football Clubs in the Yarra Valley Mountain District Football League; and for Rutherglen and the Wodonga clubs in the Tallangatta & District Football League.

Having previously worked with Denfam (a Melbourne-based construction business) and as a shearer, Winmar was employed in the mining industry and was living in Brookton, Western Australia, as of May 2012. On a visit to Perth in September 2012, Winmar had a heart attack and was hospitalised at Royal Perth Hospital.

Winmar's memoir, My Story: From Bush Kid to AFL Legend, was co-written with Matthew Hardy and published by Allen & Unwin on 31 October 2023.

Winmar was convicted and fined in 2000 for assaulting his ex-wife on Christmas Day of the previous year. In 2019, he pleaded guilty to a charge of assaulting a taxi driver in March of that year. In July 2026, Winmar was again convicted of assaulting a woman in an incident in Cohuna, Victoria in May 2025. Having been inducted in 2022 into the Australian Football Hall of Fame, Winmar was removed in 2026 after his latest conviction. Winmar was convicted and received a six-month prison sentence.

== Playing statistics ==
Winmar's player statistics are as follows:

Legend
| G | Goals | K | Kicks | D | Disposals | T | Tackles |
| B | Behinds | H | Handballs | M | Marks |

| Season | Team | No. | Games | Totals | | | | | | | Averages (per game) | | | | | | |
| Season | Team | No. | Games | G | B | K | H | D | M | T | G | B | K | H | D | M | T |
|---|---|---|---|---|---|---|---|---|---|---|---|---|---|---|---|---|---|
| 1987 | St Kilda | 7 | 20 | 37 | 28 | 290 | 82 | 372 | 90 | 39 | 1.9 | 1.4 | 14.5 | 4.1 | 18.6 | 4.5 | 2.0 |
| 1988 | St Kilda | 7 | 21 | 43 | 39 | 299 | 60 | 359 | 89 | 29 | 2.0 | 1.9 | 14.2 | 2.9 | 17.1 | 4.2 | 1.4 |
| 1989 | St Kilda | 7 | 22 | 43 | 36 | 329 | 81 | 410 | 102 | 30 | 2.0 | 1.6 | 15.0 | 3.7 | 18.6 | 4.6 | 1.4 |
| 1990 | St Kilda | 7 | 17 | 26 | 33 | 210 | 97 | 307 | 55 | 26 | 1.5 | 1.9 | 12.4 | 5.7 | 18.1 | 3.2 | 1.5 |
| 1991 | St Kilda | 7 | 17 | 12 | 13 | 295 | 135 | 430 | 65 | 38 | 0.7 | 0.8 | 17.4 | 7.9 | 25.3 | 3.8 | 2.2 |
| 1992 | St Kilda | 7 | 23 | 21 | 14 | 388 | 137 | 525 | 102 | 55 | 0.9 | 0.6 | 16.9 | 6.0 | 22.8 | 4.4 | 2.4 |
| 1993 | St Kilda | 7 | 16 | 12 | 10 | 273 | 102 | 375 | 64 | 37 | 0.8 | 0.6 | 17.1 | 6.4 | 23.4 | 4.0 | 2.3 |
| 1994 | St Kilda | 7 | 17 | 15 | 12 | 257 | 100 | 357 | 67 | 33 | 0.9 | 0.7 | 15.1 | 5.9 | 21.0 | 3.9 | 1.9 |
| 1995 | St Kilda | 7 | 22 | 21 | 21 | 386 | 161 | 547 | 97 | 66 | 1.0 | 1.0 | 17.5 | 7.3 | 24.9 | 4.4 | 3.0 |
| 1996 | St Kilda | 7 | 11 | 10 | 5 | 149 | 75 | 224 | 50 | 16 | 0.9 | 0.5 | 13.5 | 6.8 | 20.4 | 4.5 | 1.5 |
| 1997 | St Kilda | 7 | 21 | 27 | 18 | 254 | 111 | 365 | 68 | 36 | 1.3 | 0.9 | 12.1 | 5.3 | 17.4 | 3.2 | 1.7 |
| 1998 | St Kilda | 7 | 23 | 16 | 19 | 307 | 187 | 494 | 109 | 54 | 0.7 | 0.8 | 13.3 | 8.1 | 21.5 | 4.7 | 2.3 |
| 1999 | Western Bulldogs | 1 | 21 | 34 | 14 | 158 | 73 | 231 | 69 | 13 | 1.6 | 0.7 | 7.5 | 3.5 | 11.0 | 3.3 | 0.6 |
| Career | | | 251 | 317 | 262 | 3595 | 1401 | 4996 | 1027 | 472 | 1.3 | 1.0 | 14.3 | 5.6 | 19.9 | 4.1 | 1.9 |
