= Hideout (EP) =

EP by Parcels
- Released: 27 January 2017
- Studio: Studio Simon Frontzek, Berlin
- Length: 22:11
- Language: Colorsound Studio Mastering, Paris
- Label: Kitsuné

Parcels chronology
Clockscared (2015)	Hideout (2017)	Parcels (2018)

Singles from Hideout
- 1. "Myenemy" Released: 30 September 2016; 2. "Gamesofluck" Released: 28 October 2016; 3. "Older" Released: 26 November 2016; 4. "Hideout" Released: February 2017

Hideout is the second EP by Australian electropop band Parcels. The EP was announced in September 2018 and released on 27 January 2017. It peaked at number 61 in France. A remixed EP was released digitally in April 2017.

== Reception ==
Fred Lombard from Indie Music said "Rich in melodies and a unique groove, Hideout reveals itself with the confidence of young stars that nothing and no one can resist." Lombard also called the EP "five tracks that modernise and combine soul, disco and funk in a warm and wildly catchy pop momentum."

Waterloo Records said "the Hideout EP covers a lot of ground. Tracks range from driving electro thumps to softer pop taps. But what is clear in the end is that Parcels bring a unique brand of pop music and deliver it with infectious and emotive dance."

Umstrum Music said Hideoutshowcased their unique brand of indie pop, featuring laid-back grooves, infectious choruses and psychedelic synths." In reviewing the remix EP, they said "Hideout Remixed EP is an incredibly diverse collection, demonstrating the eclectic aesthetic of Parcels' universe."

Following the release of "Overnight" in June 2017, Jake Nixon from This Song Is Sick said "The band brings an electronic influence to their productions while maintaining an organic sound. The relaxing indie release is a feel good EP that flew under our radar but is sounding like something any Daft Punk fan would enjoy."

== Track listing ==
Hideout track listing
No.	Title	Writer(s)	Producer(s)	Length
1.	"Myenemy"	Jules Crommelin; Patrick Hetherington; Noah Hill; Anatole Serret; Louis Swain	Jules Crommelin; Patrick Hetherington; Noah Hill; Anatole Serret; Louis Swain	3:33
2.	"Gamesofluck"	Crommelin; Hetherington; Hill; Serret; Swain	Crommelin; Hetherington; Hill; Serret; Swain	5:48
3.	"Hideout"	Crommelin; Hetherington; Hill; Serret; Swain	Crommelin; Hetherington; Hill; Serret; Swain	4:26
4.	"Older"	Crommelin; Hetherington; Hill; Serret; Swain	Crommelin; Hetherington; Hill; Serret; Swain	3:27
5.	"Allaround"	Crommelin; Hetherington; Hill; Serret; Swain	Crommelin; Hetherington; Hill; Serret; Swain	4:56
Total length:				22:11

Hideout (Remixed) track listing
No.	Title	Length
1.	"Myenemy" (Inagwa remix)	5:13
2.	"Gamesofluck" (L'Impératrice remix)	5:45
3.	"Hideout" (Disco Despair remix)	5:05
4.	"Older" (Mouse on Mars remix)	3:27
5.	"Allaround" (Kraak & Smaak remix)	6:07
Total length:		26:43

== Charts ==
Chart (2017)	Peak position
France (SNEP)	61
