= Live Vol. 1 (Parcels album) =

Live Vol.1
- digital cover art

Live album by Parcels
- Released: 29 April 2020
- Studio: Hansa Studio, Berlin
- Label: Kitsuné, Because
- Producer: Parcels

Parcels chronology
Parcels (2018)	Live Vol.1 (2020)	Day/Night (2021)

Live Vol.1 is the first live album by Australian electropop band Parcels. The album was released digitally in April 2020 and on 2xLP in June 2020.

== Reception ==
Professional ratings
Review scores
Source	Rating
Clash	6/10

Thomas Smith from NME said "If you've caught a Parcels live show in the last few years you'll know that few do it better. There's slick grooves, stunning harmonies and swishing hair – it’s one of those rare shows allergic to duds and dull moments. Live Vol.1 captures that energy, but is just much a wonder for the technical heads. The album provides an opportunity for fans to dive into the intricate playing that make the shows the wonder that they are, while the banging interludes and reworked live versions to keep things moving."

Shannon McDonagh from Clash said Parcels Live Vol.1 is a richly coordinated display of musical chemistry, but that is where the charm ends" adding "there is little to set it apart from the original selection of tracks put out via Kitsuné in 2018."

== Track listing ==
1. "Enter"
2. "Myenemy"
3. "Bemyself"
4. "Comedown"
5. "Lightenup"
6. "Gamesofluck"
7. "Intrude"
8. "Withorwithout"
9. "Retuned"
10. "Everyroad"
11. "Overnight"
12. "Untried"
13. "Yourfault"
14. "Closetowhy"
15. "Redline"
16. "IknowhowIfeel"
17. "Elude"
18. "Tieduprightnow"
- All songs written by Jules Crommelin, Patrick Hetherington, Noah Hill, Anatole Serret, Louie Swain except "Overnight", co-written by Guy-Manuel de Homem-Christo and Thomas Bangalter.

== Charts ==
Chart (2020)	Peak position
French Albums (SNEP)	171
German Albums (Offizielle Top 100)	95
Portuguese Albums (AFP)	40
