= Shaun Daniel Allen =

Australian Indigenous artist

- Born: 1985/1986; Gold Coast, Queensland
- Known for: Painting, photography, music
- Movement: Australian Indigenous Art

Shaun Daniel Allen (born 1985/1986), also known as Shal, is an Aboriginal Australian painter, photographer, musician, and tattooist.

== Early life ==
Shaun Daniel Allen, a Bundjalung man, was born and raised on Yugambeh country on Queensland's Gold Coast. He was an only child raised alongside extended family. His family were mechanics, and none of them were "musical or into any art," according to Allen.

Allen began playing with creative endeavors as a teenager, especially through the punk and surfing communities he was a part of. These early encounters instilled Allen's creative philosophy that art was for himself and the communication of his experiences first and foremost, rather than as a way to make money.

== Painting career ==
Allen worked as a tattooist in Brisbane and a musician on the Gold Coast, before giving up both endeavors to begin painting "as a contrary to the turbulence of life". His early paintings were on butcher's paper. For subject matter, he chose "anything that wasn’t related to tattooing or what other people wanted".

The artist's works represent the waterways of his ancestral homeland and can be viewed both as specific declarations of his connection to Country and as broader meditations on finding one's way. He works with a range of materials, from polymer to ochre collected from Yugambeh country. Shal's first exhibition of paintings took place at China Heights Gallery in Sydney in 2021. The show was titled Balun, meaning river in Yugambeh.

In 2022, the Art Gallery of New South Wales cut a ribbon designed by Shal at the opening of its Sydney Modern project. In November 2022, Shal had his second exhibition at China Heights.

In July 2023, a selection of his work was exhibited by Louis Vuitton at its Brisbane boutique. In September 2023, Swiss watch and jewellery maison Chopard debuted a watch designed in collaboration with Shal.

Speaking about Shal's practice, artist Daniel Boyd says: "He has a very well-formed visual language and his work is aesthetically very beautiful, but it is also imbued with the integrity of his relationship to Country."

== Music ==
Allen is a prominent member of the Australian hardcore community. He has most notably performed as the lead vocalist in the band Nerve Damage and the bass player in the band Primitive Blast.
