= Live Vol. 1 =

Live Vol. 1 may refer to:

- Live Vol. 1, 1981 album by Gnags
- Live Vol. 1 (Ziggy Marley and the Melody Makers album), 2000
- Live Vol. 1 (Parcels album), 2020
- Live Vol. 1 (Billy Strings album), 2024
- Live! Volume One, 2002 album by the O.C. Supertones
