= Only One Mode =

Studio album by Speed
- Released: 12 July 2024
- Studio: Chameleon Studios, Sydney
- Genre: Hardcore punk
- Length: 23:51
- Label: Last Ride; Flatspot
- Producer: Elliott Gallart

Speed chronology
Gang Called Speed (2022)	Only One Mode (2024)

Singles from Only One Mode
- 1. "Real Life Love" Released: 3 May 2024; 2. "The First Test" Released: 31 May 2024; 3. "Don't Need" Released: 21 June 2024

Only One Mode is the debut studio album by Australian hardcore punk band Speed, announced in April 2024 and released on 12 July 2024.

The album was supported by a tour across the US, UK, Europe and Australia between June and August 2024.

At the 2024 ARIA Music Awards, the album won the ARIA Award for Best Hard Rock or Heavy Metal Album and was nominated for Best Group.

At the 2024 J Awards, the album was nominated for Australian Album of the Year.

The album won the inaugural NSW Music Prize in 2025.

== Singles ==
The album's lead single "Real Life Love" was released on 3 May 2024, with Aastik Bairagi from saying "[it] has tough vocals and an amazing soundscape that makes the song one of a kind." The album's second single "The First Test" was released on 31 May 2024. The song features band member Jem Siow playing a flute. The song's lyrics are about marginalised people.

== Critical reception ==
Alex Callen from Forte Magazine said "The group delivers one of the most original and refreshing takes on hardcore since its origins in the 80s and 90s". Callen continued saying "If they've got something to say, they don't shy away from it."

Conor Lochrie from Brag Media said the album "...finds the Sydney band at their most vulnerable yet, with the lyrics exploring what's special about the five-piece's beloved hardcore scene."

Al Newstead said "Speed is the real deal, and Only One Mode is a crowning achievement in what will be remembered as a defining era of hardcore, honouring its roots while pushing the scene forward."

== Track listing ==
All tracks are written by Jem Siow.

Only One Mode track listing
No.	Title	Length
1.	"Real Life Love"	3:02
2.	"Don't Need"	2:43
3.	"No Love But for Our Own"	2:53
4.	"Only Foes..."	1:09
5.	"The First Test"	2:14
6.	"Kill Cap"	3:01
7.	"Send Them 2 Sydney"	1:20
8.	"Shut It Down"	2:00
9.	"I Mean It"	2:03
10.	"Caught in a Craze"	3:26
Total length:		23:51

(Track names stylized in all caps)

== Personnel ==
Speed

- Aaron Siow – bass guitar
- Jem Siow – vocals
- Josh Clayton – guitar
- Dennis Vichidvongsa – guitar
- Kane Vardon – drums

Additional contributors

- Elliot Gallart – production, mixing, recording
- Brad Boatright – mastering
- James Hartley – photography
- Thomas Sweetman – layout, design

== Charts ==
Chart performance for Only One Mode
Chart (2024)	Peak position
Australian Albums (ARIA)	10
UK Independent Albums (OCC)	32
UK Rock & Metal Albums (OCC)	12
