= Velvet Trip =

Australian producer and musician

- Origin: Sydney, Australia
- Genre: Psychedelic pop
- Members: Zeppelin Hamilton
- Website: www.velvettripband.com

Velvet Trip is the project of Wiradjuri artist Zeppelin Hamilton, born and imagined on Gadigal Country, Sydney, Australia. Blending psychedelic rock, indie pop and soul, Velvet Trip is led by Hamilton as vocalist, guitarist, producer and songwriter, and performs live with a full band.

== Background and career ==
Velvet Trip is led by Zeppelin Hamilton, a Wiradjuri multi-instrumentalist, singer, producer and songwriter, who fronts the project as vocalist, guitarist and producer. Emerging from Sydney, Velvet Trip gained early attention as a triple j Unearthed feature artist and as a winner of the triple j Unearthed x NIDA competition, and Hamilton was selected for Mushroom Group's First Nations Pathway Program in 2023.

The debut album Harmony Blooms, released on 9 February 2024, reached number four on the ARIA Blues and Roots chart, with singles including "It's Only Human", "Silly Boy", "Electric Dreams" and "Moving On".

2025 was Velvet Trip's breakthrough year, anchored by the campaign around the Glimmers EP. Its single "The Bends" became the highest-charting independent Australian release on the Australian Shazam chart at the time, and Velvet Trip finished the year as the number one most-played artist on triple j Unearthed for 2025. That momentum converted into a run of major live moments across the same year, including support slots for Djo and Parcels, a performance at triple j's One Night Stand, and a sold-out headline show at the Sydney Opera House (Utzon Room) on the Glimmers tour.

In 2026, the album Glimmers Continued debuted at number five on the ARIA Australian Albums Chart and was named a triple j Feature Album. Velvet Trip has been featured in NME, The New York Times (T Magazine) and Russh, and NITV described the project as "breaking new ground in Blak music". The band has performed at festivals including Byron Bay Bluesfest (2024 and 2025), Yours & Owls, BIGSOUND, SXSW Sydney and the National Indigenous Music Awards.

== Musical style ==
Velvet Trip's music blends psychedelic rock, indie pop and soul, shaped by Hamilton's world-building production and unguarded songwriting. The project pairs expansive, psychedelic sonics with deeply personal narratives, and has been recognised for reshaping contemporary Australian sound through a distinctly First Nations lens.

== Discography ==
=== Albums ===
List of albums, with release date and label shown
Title	Details
Harmony Blooms	Released: February 2024; Label: Zeppelin Hamilton; Formats: Digital download, LP
Glimmers Continued	Released: January 2026; Label: Zeppelin Hamilton; Formats: Digital download, CD, LP

=== Extended plays ===
List of extended plays, with release date and label shown
Title	Details
Velvet Trip & the Six Moon Skies	Released: May 2019; Label: Velvet Trip; Formats: Digital download
Glimmers	Released: May 2025; Label: Zeppelin Hamilton; Formats: Digital download

== Awards and nominations ==
=== NSW Music Prize ===
The NSW Music Prize aims to "celebrate, support and incentivise" the NSW's most talented artists, with "the aim of inspiring the next generations of stars". It commenced in 2025.

Year	Nominee / work	Award	Result	Ref.
2026	Glimmers Continued	NSW First Nations Music Prize ($40,000)	Nominated	
2026	Velvet Trip	NSW Breakthrough Artist of the Year	Nominated	
