= Bumpy (singer) =

Australian singer and songwriter

- Born: Amy Dowd
- Occupations: Singer; songwriter; musician
- Years active: 2020–present
- Label: Astral Music

Amy Dowd, (known professionally as Bumpy) is an Australian singer, songwriter and producer. Dowd is a Noongar woman, is the lead singer of band Squid Nebula and is a performer in the First Nations collective DRMNGNOW. Bumpy released her debut EP in January 2023.

In a February 2021 interview with Frankie magazine, Dowd said, "When I was little, I was constantly running into everything: ironing boards, car mirrors, tables, doors. That's where the name Bumpy came from."

== Music career ==
In September 2020, Bumpy released her debut track "Falling". Triple J said "'Falling' is a seriously special song. Bumpy's raw vocals, a gently-plucked guitar and a splash of timeless, romantic song writing make for a hypnotic serenade that's almost certain to get the spine tinglin' and the goosebumps bumpin'."

This was followed by a two-year hiatus from releasing music.

In November 2021, Bumpy was asked to curate the opening night of Melbourne Music Week.

In early 2022, it was announced that Bumpy has signed to Astral Music.

In May 2022, Bumpy released her second solo single "Return Home" In a statement, Bumpy said "'Return Home' surfaced while in isolation and allowed me to express thoughts that I wouldn't usually vocalise. This song has become a grounding reminder that connection is a constant journey whilst spotlighting the importance of home, family and story." "Leave It All Behind" followed in July 2022 and "Hide and Seek" in December 2022.

In July 2025, Bumpy announced the release of her debut album Kanana and shared its title track.

== Discography ==
=== Albums ===
List of albums, with release date, label and selected peak chart position shown
Title	Details	Peak chart positions
Title	Details	AUS
Kanana	Released: 3 October 2025; Format: LP, digital; Label: Astral People (APR120)	98

=== Extended plays ===
List of EPs, with selected details
Title	Details
Morning Sun	Released: 27 January 2023; Format: digital; Label: Astral People

=== Singles ===
List of singles, with year released and album name shown
Title	Year	Album
"Falling"	2020	Non-album single
"Return Home"	2022	Morning Sun
"Leave It All Behind"	2022	Morning Sun
"Hide and Seek"	2022	Morning Sun
"Maambakoort"	2025	Kanana
"Kanana"	2025	Kanana
"Cosy Comfort"	2025	Kanana
"Feel Good"	2025	Kanana
"Nan's the Word"	2025	Kanana

== Awards and nominations ==
=== AIR Awards ===
The Australian Independent Record Awards (commonly known informally as AIR Awards) is an annual awards night to recognise, promote and celebrate the success of Australia's Independent Music sector.

Year	Nominee / work	Award	Result	Ref.
2024	Morning Sun	Best Independent Soul/R&B Album or EP	Nominated	
2026	Kanana	Best Independent Soul/R&B Album or EP	Nominated	

=== Music Victoria Awards ===
The Music Victoria Awards are an annual awards night celebrating Victorian music. They commenced in 2006.

Year	Nominee / work	Award	Result	Ref.
2022	Bumpy	The Archie Roach Foundation Award for Emerging Talent	Won	
2023	Bumpy	Soul, Funk, RNB & Gospel Work	Won	

=== National Indigenous Music Awards ===
The National Indigenous Music Awards is an annual awards ceremony that recognises the achievements of Indigenous Australians in music. The award ceremony commenced in 2004. Electric Fields have won one award from four nominations.

Year	Nominee / work	Award	Result	Ref.
2022	Bumpy	Triple J Unearthed National Indigenous Winner	Won	
2023	Bumpy	New Talent of the Year	Won	
2023	"Hide and Seek"	Song of the Year	Nominated	
2026	Bumpy	Artist of the Year	Nominated	
