= Gang Called Speed =

EP by Speed
- Released: 24 June 2022
- Studio: Chameleon
- Genre: Hardcore punk • tough guy hardcore
- Length: 13:41
- Label: Last Ride, Flat Spot

Speed chronology
Gang Called Speed (2022)	Only One Mode (2024)

Singles from Gang Called Speed
- 1. "Not That Nice" Released: 18 May 2022; 2. "Move" Released: 7 June 2022

Gang Called Speed is the debut extended play (EP) by Australian hardcore punk band Speed, released on 24 June 2022. It debuted and peaked at number 5 on the ARIA Charts.

In an interview with NME Jem Siow said "Even though this is our first EP, [we're] sort of approaching it almost like a debut album. That's why it's called Gang Called Speed – this is the identity of the band. This is what we're all about. This is Australian hardcore."

== Critical reception ==
Professional ratings
Review scores
Source	Rating
Distorted Sound	7/10
Metal Noise	7.5/10
New Noise Magazine	4/5 stars

Adam Yoe from No Echo called the EP "one of the year's finest records" and called the vocals "the real highwater mark".

Metal Noise said "The six songs on the EP are centered around recognising who you are in this world, taking ownership of that identity and not letting anyone tell you otherwise, a message that hits home like being broadsided by a truck".

Ellis Heasley from Distorted Sound said "the emphasis here seems to be on more bouncy riff parts and slower crushing beatdowns than the more out and out thrashing side of hardcore". Healsey also noted "the focus here is very much on promoting diversity, inclusion and taking ownership of one's identity".

Ryan O'Connor from New Noise Magazine said "The band have brought their own brand of fury to the table with intricate grooves and mosh-ready anthems."

== Track listing ==
Gang Called Speed track listing
No.	Title	Length
1.	"Not That Nice"	2:42
2.	"Another Toy"	1:33
3.	"Move"	2:29
4.	"Big Bite"	1:58
5.	"Every Man for Themself"	1:54
6.	"Know Your Foe"	3:03
Total length:		13:41

== Charts ==
Chart performance for Gang Called Speed
Chart (2022)	Peak position
Australian Albums (ARIA)	5
