= South Summit (band) =

Australian band

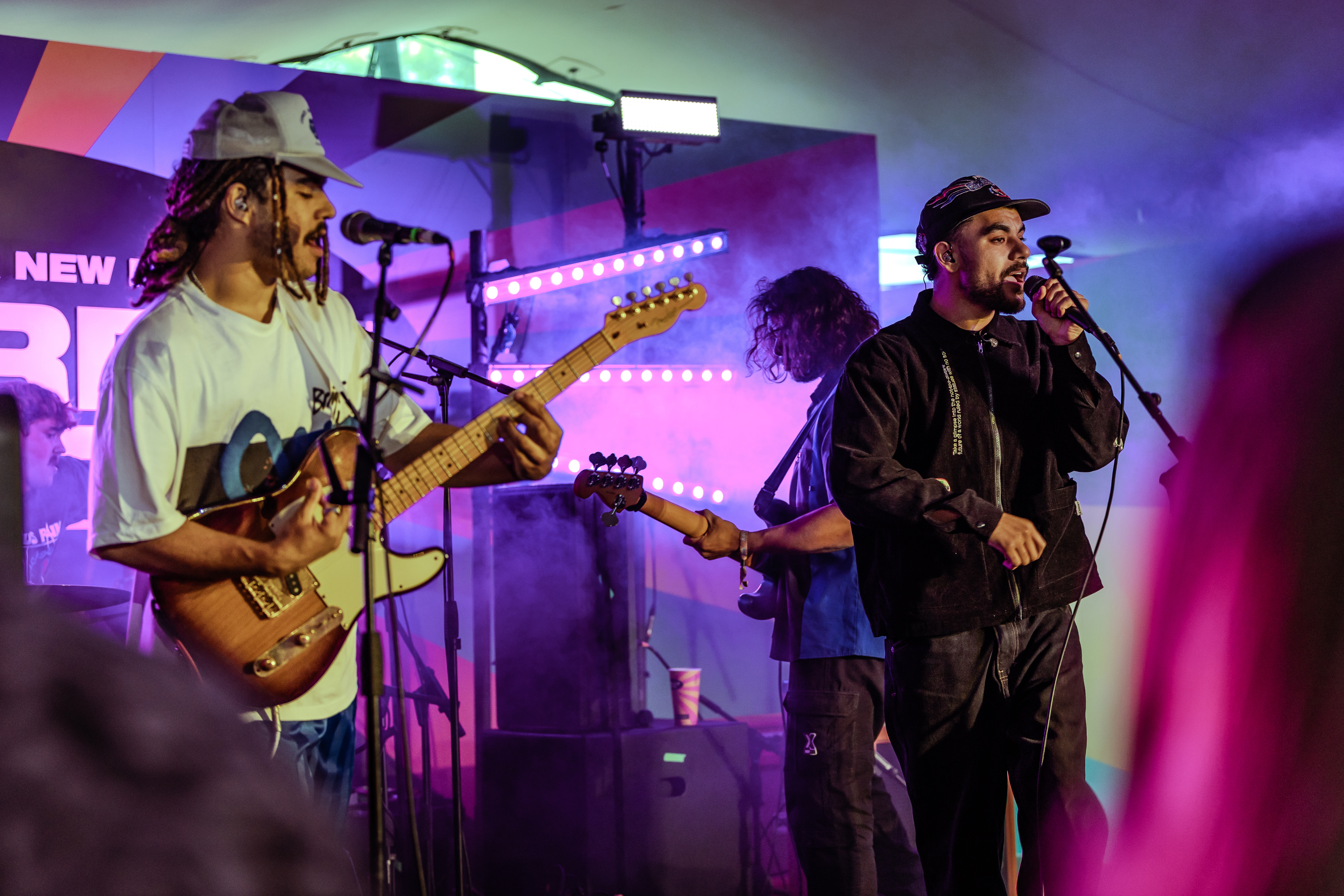

Background information
- Origin: Perth, Australia
- Genres: indie rock; reggae
- Years active: 2020–present
- Label: Virgin Music Australia
- Members: Josh Trindall; Nathan Osborne; Isaiah Reuben; Nehemiah Reuben; Fynn Samorali
- Website: https://www.southsummitband.com

South Summit are an Australian band from Perth, formed in 2020. They released their debut studio album The Bliss in November 2024.

== History ==
South Summit were formed in 2020. They released their debut EP Merlin's in January 2021.

In January 2023, they released their second EP, Creatures. In speaking about the release, the band said "This EP was done in blocks of days in the studio spread out months apart, usually working on 1-2 songs at a time. This allowed us to focus strongly on each song as its own piece of work."

In August 2023, they released their third EP, Tales of the Yeti. Upon release, guitarist and vocalist Nehemiah Reuben said "For Tales of the Yeti, we wanted to keep building musically from what we had previously done before, experimenting with more styles and not being strict on what themes came out of the jamming process. This EP covers a few genres and shows what we're capable of when playing music. We enjoy all types of different styles and love jamming whatever feels good, this EP is a good representation of that."

In April 2024, the band signed with Lemon Tree Music.

The band released their debut album The Bliss in November 2024. it debuted at number 25 on the ARIA Albums Chart.

In February 2026, they announced their second studio album Run It Back will be released in June 2026.

== Band members ==
- Nathan Osborne – drums
- Isaiah Reuben – lead vocals
- Nehemiah Reuben – vocals, rhythm guitar
- Fynn Samorali – lead guitar
- Josh Trindall – bass guitar

== Discography ==
=== Albums ===
List of albums, with selected details and peak chart positions shown
Title	Details	Peak chart positions
Title	Details	AUS
The Bliss	Released: 8 November 2024; Label: South Summit, Virgin (SS001LP); Formats: LP, digital download	25
Run It Back	Released: 12 June 2026; Label: South Summit, GYRO; Formats: digital download	10

=== EPs ===
List of extended plays, with selected details shown
Title	Details
Merlin's	Released: January 2021; Label: South Summit, Virgin; Formats: Digital download
Creatures	Released: 12 January 2023; Label: South Summit, Virgin; Formats: Digital download
Tales of the Yeti	Released: 4 August 2023; Label: South Summit, Virgin; Formats: Digital download

== Awards and nominations ==
=== APRA Music Awards ===
The APRA Music Awards were established by Australasian Performing Right Association (APRA) in 1982 to honour the achievements of songwriters and music composers, and to recognise their song writing skills, sales and airplay performance, by its members annually.

Year	Nominee / work	Award	Result	Ref.
2025	"Givin' it Up"	Most Performed Blues & Roots Work	Nominated	

=== J Awards ===
The J Awards are an annual series of Australian music awards that were established by the Australian Broadcasting Corporation's youth-focused radio station Triple J. They commenced in 2005.

Year	Nominee / work	Award	Result	Ref.
2026	Run It Back	Australian Album of the Year	Nominated	

=== National Indigenous Music Awards ===
The National Indigenous Music Awards is an annual awards ceremony that recognises the achievements of Indigenous Australians in music.

Year	Nominee / work	Award	Result	Ref.
2026	"Aim for the Stars"	Film Clip of the Year	Nominated	
