= 2024 J Awards =

20th annual J Awards

- Awarded for: The best in Australian music
- Date: 14 November 2024
- Presented by: Triple J
- Most nominations: Amyl and the Sniffers (3)
- Website: abc.net.au/triplej

The 2024 J Awards are the 20th annual J Awards, established by the Australian Broadcasting Corporation's youth-focused radio station Triple J. It awards the best albums, artists, live acts and music videos in the Australian music scene, as determined by the network's teams.

The eligibility period was for releases between November 2023 and October 2024. Nominees were announced on 1 November 2024, the first day of Ausmusic Month. The awards were presented on 14 November.

== Awards ==
=== Australian Album of the Year ===
Albums chosen for their creativity, musicianship and contribution to Australian music.

List of Australian Album of the Year nominees
Artist	Album	Result
3%	Kill the Dead	Nominated
Amyl and the Sniffers	Cartoon Darkness	Nominated
The Buoys	Lustre	Nominated
The Kid Laroi	The First Time	Nominated
Middle Kids	Faith Crisis Pt 1	Nominated
Nick Ward	House With the Blue Door	Nominated
Royel Otis	Pratts & Pain	Nominated
Rüfüs Du Sol	Inhale/Exhale	Nominated
Speed	Only One Mode	Nominated
Sycco	Zorb	Won

=== Australian Live Act of the Year ===
Introduced in 2023, this award critiques Australian live acts on consistency, quality and creativity.

List of Australian Live Act of the Year nominees
Artist	Result
Angie McMahon	Won
Confidence Man	Nominated
Speed	Nominated
Teenage Dads	Nominated
What So Not	Nominated

=== Australian Video of the Year ===
Co-presented with Rage, this award celebrates creativity, originality and technical excellence in music videos.

List of Australian Video of the Year nominees
Artist	Song	Director	Result
3% featuring Jessica Mauboy	"Won't Stop"	Nick Rae, Jordan Ruyi Blanch	Nominated
Amyl and the Sniffers	"U Should Not Be Doing That"	John Angus Stewart	Nominated
Emily Wurramara featuring Tasman Keith	"Lordy Lordy"	Claudia Sangiorgi Dalimore	Won
Nick Ward	"Shooting Star"	Nick Ward, Charles Buxton-Leslie	Nominated
Party Dozen	"Coup De Gronk"	Versus	Nominated

=== Unearthed Artist of the Year ===
Presented by Triple J Unearthed, the talent recruitment platform of Triple J, nominees must have won an Unearthed competition, been a Feature Artist, or played one at one Unearthed's events.

List of Unearthed Artist of the Year nominees
Artist	Result
Aleksiah	Nominated
The Belair Lip Bombs	Nominated
Ben Gerrans	Nominated
Lithe	Won
Maanyung	Nominated

=== Double J Artist of the Year ===
Presented by Double J, a sister station of Triple J, these nominees impressed the team with their musical excellence and long-term contributions to Australian music.

List of Double J Artist of the Year nominees
Artist	Result
Amyl and the Sniffers	Nominated
Dobby	Nominated
Emily Wurramara	Nominated
Missy Higgins	Won
Nick Cave	Nominated
