= Day/Night =

- digital cover

Studio album by Parcels
- Released: 5 November 2021
- Studio: La Frette Studios, Paris
- Label: Because
- Producer: Parcels and James Ford

Parcels chronology
Live Vol. 1 (2020)	Day/Night (2021)	Live Vol. 2 (2023)

Singles from Day/Night
- 1. "Free" Released: June 2021; 2. "Comingback" Released: July 2021; 3. "Somethinggreater" Released: September 2021; 4. "Theworstthing" Released: October 2021; 5. "Famous" Released: November 2021

Day/Night is the second studio album by Australian electropop band Parcels. The album was announced in September 2021, alongside third single "Somethinggreater" and released on 5 November 2021.

== Reception ==
Professional ratings
Review scores
Source	Rating
NME	4/5 stars
Still Listening Magazine	88/100

Rhys Buchanan from NME said "Parcels have gone all in to produce a sprawling and inventive double album" and "This daring album sets yet another high bar for this band, and leaves us itching to find out where they'll go next."

Greg Walker from Northern Transmissions said "It's a long album, one hour and 36 minutes, but every moment keeps you engaged, with their brilliant disco-infused, then slow jazz-tinged modern rock."

Al Newstead from Triple J said "Double albums are unruly beasts" but went on to explore to two sides saying Day contains the more familiar Parcels sound: scratchy guitars, popping basslines, elegant piano, everything luxuriates in string arrangements from violinist-to-the-stars Owen Pallett. [whilst] Night has some of the same bump n' grind but slips into its evening gown - all moody, nocturnal atmosphere. Lyrically, it's a much more sombre affair, too."

Fraser Johnson said "They sound (and dress like) like every great pop, rock, and disco band of the last 60 years, all rolled into one. It's absolutely infectious." Johnson compared the two sides saying "The first, Day, is loose, raw and uplifting. In Night, the production shifts ever-so slightly into a brooding, darker and more affected affair."

== Track listing ==
Day track listing
No.	Title	Writer(s)	Length
1.	"Light"	Jules Crommelin; Patrick Hetherington	6:13
2.	"Free"	Crommelin	5:27
3.	"Comingback"	Crommelin; Hetherington; Noah Hill	5:11
4.	"Theworstthing"	Hetherington	3:03
5.	"Inthecity" (interlude)	Crommelin; Hetherington; Owen Pallett	1:57
6.	"NowIcaresomemore"	Hetherington	2:59
7.	"Somethinggreater"	Crommelin; Hetherington; Hill	5:31
8.	"Daywalk"	Crommelin; Hetherington; Hill; Anatole Serret; Loius Swain	3:39
9.	"Outside"	Hetherington	7:13

Night track listing
No.	Title	Writer(s)	Length
1.	"SHADOW"	Crommelin; Hetherington	3:01
2.	"Neverloved"	Crommelin	4:11
3.	"Famous"	Crommelin	4:49
4.	"Icallthishome"	Hetherington	1:09
5.	"LordHenry"	Crommelin; Hetherington	5:32
6.	"Thefear"	Hetherington	3:26
7.	"Nightwalk"	Crommelin; Hetherington	6:47
8.	"Reflex"	Crommelin	4:44
9.	"Once"	Crommelin; Hetherington	4:39
10.	"Inside"	Crommelin; Hetherington; Hill; Serret; Swain	3:02

== Charts ==
Chart (2021–2022)	Peak position
Australian Albums (ARIA)	30
Belgian Albums (Ultratop Flanders)	103
Belgian Albums (Ultratop Wallonia)	43
French Albums (SNEP)	33
German Albums (Offizielle Top 100)	19
Dutch Albums (Album Top 100)	55
Portuguese Albums (AFP)	30
Spanish Albums (PROMUSICAE)	70
Swiss Albums (Schweizer Hitparade)	31
UK Sales Chart (OCC)	83
