= Barkaa =

Australian rapper (born 1995)

Chloe Quayle (born 1995), known by her stage name Barkaa (stylised in all caps), is an Aboriginal Australian (Malyangapa and Barkindji) rapper and musician.

In 2020, GQ Magazine dubbed her "the new matriarch of Australian rap", and Triple J listed her as one of the top 5 female rappers in Australia.

== Early life ==
Barkaa was born as Chloe Quayle in 1995. Her mother was one of the Stolen Generations, and she had an uncle who died in police custody. She lived in the Greater Western Sydney suburb of Merrylands as a child. She was known for performing rap at high school, and entered rap competitions in Blacktown. She is a Malyangapa and Barkindji woman.

== Career ==
Barkaa takes her name from the Barkindji word for the Darling River, and says that she feels very honoured to have been given permission to use this name to represent her people. Her music reflects her experiences with incarceration, child removal and addiction, with much of it overtly political; she has drawn from the words of Shareena Clanton and Rosalie Kunoth-Monks in her songs.

She first performed in front of an audience in 2019, at a Klub Koori event.

She released her debut single, "For My Tittas", in March 2020. Her song "Our Lives Matter", released in June 2020, became the unofficial anthem for the Black Lives Matter movement in Australia. She has collaborated with DOBBY ("I Can't Breathe") and Electric Fields, and has performed at the Sydney Opera House, Enmore Theatre in Sydney and the Sidney Myer Music Bowl in Melbourne.

Her debut album, released on 2 December 2021, was Blak Matriarchy, so named "in honour of powerful First Nations women who've paved the way for future generations", including her mother. The song "King Brown", which she says is about a "shitty ex" is on the album. The album was produced by jayteehazard. The Blak Matriarchy EP begins with a sample of actress Shareena Clanton. One of the standout tracks is "Bow Down", which was used in Warwick Thornton's 2021-2022 vampire TV series, Firebite.

Barkaa performed at the Paartjima festival on the 2022 Easter weekend in Alice Springs.

In August 2024, Barkaa announced the forthcoming release of her second EP Big Tidda which she described as "a celebration of Blak joy, the importance of Blak love and just feeling yourself".

As of September 2024, Barkaa is signed to Bad Apples Music, which was founded by Briggs.

== Personal life ==
Barkaa grew up with a single mother. She was addicted to methamphetamine as a teenager, and spent three periods in juvenile detention, where she gave birth to her third child, a son, c. 2016. She has been sober since, and has her children back. Her daughter Alinta often performs with her.

== Discography ==
=== Extended plays ===
Title	EP details	Peak chart positions	
Title	EP details	AUS HH/R&B	AUS Aus. HH/R&B
Blak Matriarchy	Released: 2 December 2021; Label: Bad Apples; Formats: Digital download, streaming	—	7
Big Tidda	Released: 30 August 2024; Label: Bad Apples; Formats: Digital download, streaming	26	2

=== Singles ===
Title	Year	Album
"For My Tittas"	2020	Non-album singles
"Our Lives Matter"	2020	Non-album singles
"I Can't Breathe" (with Dobby)	2020	Non-album singles
"22Clan"	2020	Non-album singles
"Groovy"	2020	Non-album singles
"King Brown"	2021	Blak Matriarchy
"Blak Matriarchy"	2021	Blak Matriarchy
"Fight for Me" (featuring Electric Fields)	2022	Blak Matriarchy
"Ball On 'em"	2022	Non-album singles
"Division"	2023	Non-album singles
"We Up"	2024	Big Tidda
"Preach"	2024	Big Tidda
"Bow Down" (Jayteehazard x Flywaves remix)	2025	Non-album single
"Ngamaka" (featuring Leroy Johnson)	2025	TBA
"World Turning"(Like a Version) (with Jessica Mauboy)	2025	Non-album single

== Awards and nominations ==
=== APRA Music Awards ===
The APRA Music Awards were established by Australasian Performing Right Association (APRA) in 1982 to honour the achievements of songwriters and music composers, and to recognise their song writing skills, sales and airplay performance, by its members annually.

Year	Nominee / work	Award	Result	Ref.
2025	"We Up" (Chloe Quayle and Jacob Turier)	Song of the Year	Shortlisted	
2026	Barkaa	Emerging Songwriter of the Year	Nominated	

=== ARIA Music Awards ===
The ARIA Music Awards is an annual awards ceremony held by the Australian Recording Industry Association. They commenced in 1987.

Year	Nominee / work	Award	Result	Ref.
2022	Blak Matriarchy	Best Hip Hop / Rap Release	Nominated	
2022	"Blak Matriarchy" (Barkaa, Selina Miles)	Best Video	Nominated	
2024	Barkaa	Best Australian Live Act	Nominated	
2025	Big Tidda	Best Solo Artist	Nominated	
2025	Big Tidda	Best Hip Hop/Rap Release	Won	
2025	Big Tidda Tour	Best Australian Live Act	Nominated	

=== National Indigenous Music Awards ===
The National Indigenous Music Awards is an annual awards ceremony that recognises the achievements of Indigenous Australians in music.

Year	Nominee / work	Award	Result	Ref.
2022	Barkaa	New Talent of the Year	Nominated	
2022	"King Brown"	Song of the Year	Won	
2022	"King Brown"	Film Clip of the Year	Nominated	
2022	"Blak Matriarchy"	Film Clip of the Year	Nominated	
2024	Barkaa	Artist of the Year	Won	
2024	"We Up"	Film Clip of the Year	Won	
2024	"We Up"	Song of the Year	Nominated	
2025	Big Tidda	Album of the Year	Won	
2025	"Ngmaka" (featuring Leroy Johnson)	Film Clip of the Year	Nominated	
2025	"Ngmaka" (featuring Leroy Johnson)	Song of the Year	Nominated	

=== National Live Music Awards ===
The National Live Music Awards (NLMAs) commenced in 2016 to recognise contributions to the live music industry in Australia.

Year	Nominee / work	Award	Result	Ref.
2023	Barkaa	Best Hip Hop Act	Nominated	

=== NSW Music Prize ===
The NSW Music Prize aims to "celebrate, support and incentivise" the NSW's most talented artists, with "the aim of inspiring the next generations of stars". It commenced in 2025.

Year	Nominee / work	Award	Result	Ref.
2025	Big Tidda	NSW Music Prize	Nominated	
2025	Big Tidda	NSW First Nations Music Prize	Won	

=== Rolling Stone Australia Awards ===
The Rolling Stone Australia Awards are awarded annually in January or February by the Australian edition of Rolling Stone magazine for outstanding contributions to popular culture in the previous year.

Year	Nominee / work	Award	Result	Ref.
2025	Barkaa	Best Live Act	Shortlisted	
