= Colour of Your Jumper =

Single by Archie Roach
- B-side: "Heal the People"
- Released: 24 May 2013
- Recorded: 2013
- Length: 3:26
- Label: Liberation Records
- Songwriter(s): Archie Roach

Archie Roach singles chronology
| "We Won't Cry" (2012) | "Colour of Your Jumper" (2013) | "Freedom" (2014) |

"Colour of Your Jumper" is a song written by Australian singer songwriter Archie Roach in 1993, following an incident where Indigenous Australian Football League player Nicky Winmar was receiving racial abuse from spectators resulting in Winmar lifting up his jumper and, facing to the crowd, pointed to his skin. A demo of this version was later included on the 2013 compilation album Creation.

In May 2010, Roach performed the song at Melbourne's Federation Square as part of the Long Walk festivities.

In May 2013, Roach re-recorded and released "Colour of Your Jumper" which was released as a single. Roach performed the song live on The Marngrook Footy Show on 23 May 2013 and at the AFL Indigenous Round Saturday "Dreamtime at the 'G" game on 25 May 2013 between Essendon and Richmond.

The song was re-recorded again and included on Roach's 2018 album, Dancing with My Spirit.

== Background ==
On 17 April 1993 at Victoria Park, Melbourne, an Australian Football League match between Collingwood and St Kilda Football Club was taking place. St Kilda player Nicky Winmar was racially abused by members of the Collingwood cheer squad, who yelled for him to "go and sniff some petrol" and "go walkabout where you came from". At the conclusion of the game, Winmar lifted up his jumper and, facing to the crowd, pointed to his skin. The following day, a photograph of Winmar's gesture was published by Sunday Age and Sunday Herald Sun. The gesture, was described as a "powerful statement", an "anti-racist symbol", and one of the "most poignant" images in Australian sport, has been credited as a catalyst for the movement against racism in Australian football. The event inspired Roach to write the song "Colour of Your Jumper", and in particular, racist comments from then Collingwood Football Club president Allan McAllister.

Roach said “When Nicky lifted his jumper that day and pointed to his black skin in defiance of the racial abuse directed at him and other indigenous players in 1993, it made me sad and angry that this champion would have to do that. More importantly, I think, is what the jumper meant to Nicky and many others on that fateful day. What I saw was not just an Aboriginal man proud of his heritage and people, but a young man who had made it, an elite sportsman in the greatest game, Australian Rules Football, the AFL, who played his heart out for that jumper.”

== Track listing ==
| No. | Title | Length |
|---|---|---|
| 1. | "Colour of Your Jumper" | 3:26 |
| 2. | "Heal the People" | 4:25 |

== Release history ==
| Region | Date | Format | Edition(s) | Label |
|---|---|---|---|---|
| Australia | 24 May 2013 | CD single; Digital download | Standard | Liberation Records |
