= National Indigenous Music Awards 2026 =

Edition of Australian music awards

- Date: 8 August 2026
- Venue: Darwin Amphitheatre, Northern Territory, Australia

Highlights
- Most wins: Baker Boy (3)
- Most nominations: Baker Boy, Birdz and Fred Leone (4)
- Website: nima.musicnt.com.au

The 23rd National Indigenous Music Awards (NIMAS) took place on 8 August 2026. Nominations were announced on 10 July 2026 during NAIDOC Week.

== Performers ==
Performers at the event included:

- Baker Boy
- Big Noter
- Bumpy
- Casii Williams
- Electric Fields
- Stiff Gins
- Zipporah

== Hall of Fame inductee ==
- Marlene Cummins, a Guguyelandji and Woppaburra woman and a leading Indigenous female blues voice, broadcaster, activist, dancer and actress.
- Saltwater Band, a reggae and ska-influenced pop group that sung mostly in Yolŋu languages. They were nominated for APRA Awards, ARIA Music Awards and won three National Indigenous Music Awards.

== Triple J Unearthed National Indigenous Winner ==
- TooLa

== Awards ==
The nominations were revealed on 10 July 2026. Winners indicated in boldface, with other nominees in plain.

Artist of the Year

Artist	Result
3%	Nominated
Baker Boy	Nominated
**Birdz and Fred Leone**	Won
Bumpy	Nominated
Jem Cassar-Daley	Nominated
Miss Kaninna	Nominated
South Summit	Nominated

Best New Talent of the Year

Artist	Result
**Drifting Clouds**	Won
Inkabee	Nominated
Jet Cameron	Nominated
Say True God	Nominated
Voices of Resistance	Nominated
Zipporah	Nominated

Album of the Year

Artist and album	Result
**Baker Boy - Djandjay**	Won
Birdz & Fred Leone – Gira	Nominated
Say True God? – Blak	Nominated
Emma Donovan – Take Me to the River	Nominated
Stiff Gins – Crossroads	Nominated
Trials – Hendle	Nominated

Film Clip of the Year

Artist and song	Result
3% – "Our Greats"	Nominated
**Baker Boy (featuring Thelma Plum, Emma Donovan, Kee'Ahn & Jada Weazel) – "Thick Skin"**	Won
Birdz & Fred Leone – "Wanya Nyin Yanmanj"	Nominated
Drifting Clouds – "Bawuypawuy"	Nominated
Kobie Dee – "Aim for the Stars"	Nominated
South Summit – "Top of the Hill"	Nominated

Song of the Year

Artist and song	Result
**Baker Boy (featuring Thelma Plum, Emma Donovan, Kee'Ahn & Jada Weazel) – "Thick Skin"**	Won
Birdz & Fred Leone – "Wanya Nyin Yanmanj"	Nominated
Drifting Clouds – "Bawupawuy"	Nominated
Jem Cassar-Daley – "Front Left Pocket"	Nominated
Yung Maynie - "Always Was"	Nominated
Zipporah - "Some Typa Way"	Nominated

Community Clip of the Year

Artist and song	Result
Bulman School & Community – "Lok Los Mah Burarr (Lizard & Goanna)"	Nominated
Geraldton - "(Barndi Yarraly) Vaping is Vicious – Not Delicious"	Nominated
K2 the B and CJR – "Barunga"	Nominated
Mossman Gorge – "Yundu Bama Yalada"	Nominated
Mossman Mob - "Still Believing"	Nominated
**Northern Peninsula Area (NPA) - "All the Way from the NPA"**	Won
Wujal Wujal - "Rainforest to the Sea"	Nominated
