= Won't Stop (3% song) =

Single by 3% featuring Jessica Mauboy
- Released: 5 July 2024
- Length: 3:01
- Label: 1788
- Songwriters: Corey Webster; Dallas Woods; Danzal Baker; Andrew Burford; Madeline Crabtree
- Producer: One Above

3% singles chronology
"Calling Home" (2024)	"Won't Stop" (2024)	"Prisoner" (2024)

Jessica Mauboy singles chronology
"Higher" (2024)	"Won't Stop" (2024)	"World Turning" (2025)

Music video
- "Won't Stop" on YouTube

"Won't Stop" is a song by Australian supergroup 3% featuring Jessica Mauboy, released on 5 July 2024 as the fifth and final single from the group's debut studio album, Kill the Dead.

At the 2024 J Awards, Nick Rae, Jordan Ruyi Blanch directed music video was nominated for the Australian Video of the Year.

At the APRA Music Awards of 2025, the song was shortlisted for APRA Song of the Year.

At the AIR Awards of 2025, the music video won Independent Music Video of the Year.

At the National Indigenous Music Awards 2025, the song was nominated for Song of the Year and Film Clip of the Year.

== Reception ==
Joseph Guenzler from National Indigenous Times said, "'Won't Stop' includes a sharp piano motif and triumphant horns, with (Dallas) Woods, Nooky and (Angus) Field delivering verses around Mauboy's powerful chorus."

In the album review, Sosefina Fuamoli from Rolling Stone Australia called the song the "album highlight".

== Music video ==
The music video was filmed at the former Bomaderry Aboriginal Children's Home, a place where for decades Aboriginal children were forcibly removed from their families. Director Nick Rae said, "I came home from this shoot and bawled my eyes out. The weight you feel in these rooms is like nothing else. I have to say a massive thank you to Kathleen and Dave of the Bomaderry Homes Organisation, as well as the Elders, many of whom grew up in the Bomaderry Homes, for helping the entire crew understand the significance and importance of the place and allowing us to listen, learn, and create meaningful art. I can't really put into words how grateful we are, although I know I'm going to reflect on this project for a very long time".

Guenzler of National Indigenous Times said the video "portrays the healing process of the site and includes storytelling by Elders who were taken to Bomaderry as children, educating viewers on its historical significance."
