= Our Greats =

Single by 3%
- Released: 4 July 2025
- Length: 3:01
- Label: 1788
- Songwriters: Corey Webster; Dallas Woods; Angus Field; Andrew Burford
- Producer: One Above

3% singles chronology
"Prisoner" (2024)	"Our Greats" (2025)	"Running Through My Head" (2025)

"Our Greats" is a song by Australian supergroup 3%, released on 4 July 2025. The single was released to coincide with NAIDOC Week and features a dialogue with a chorus of children, including many from Indigenous youth organisation We Are Warriors. The song name-drops several Indigenous Australians including Cathy Freeman, Kyah Simon, Ash Barty, Patty Mills, Lionel Rose and Adam Goodes as well as music groups No Fixed Address and Coloured Stone. In a statement, the group said the song is "a tribute to the giants who walked before us."

At the 2026 NSW Music Prize, it was nominated for NSW First Nations Music Prize.

== Music video ==
The music video was directed by Gabriel Gasparinatos, Nick Rae, and Nooky, and was released on 3 July 2025. It features cameos from Cathy Freeman and Patty Mills.

In August 2025, a second video was created in collaboration with Fox League and celebrated the NRL and NRLW's 2025 Indigenous Round. The video was filmed on the roof of Sydney Football Stadium / Allianz Stadium and features rugby league stars Latrell Mitchell, Josh Addo-Carr and Mahalia Murphy and Fox League's Matt Nable. The music video was released on 7 August 2025 and featured throughout the leagues coverage in rounds 23 and 24.

At the 2025 ARIA Music Awards, the song won Best Use of an Australian Recording in an Advertisement.

At the National Indigenous Music Awards 2026, the video was nominated for Film Clip of the Year.

== Reception ==
John Zebra from AAA Backstage said "'Our Greats' builds on their legacy of politically-charged, soul-baring hip hop, and continues their mission to empower Indigenous youth and spotlight the stories that shape their community."
