= Parcels (album) =

Studio album by Parcels
- Released: 12 October 2018
- Studio: Mesanic Studios
- Labels: Kitsuné, Because

Parcels chronology
Hideout (2017)	Parcels (2018)	Live Vol. 1 (2020)

Singles from Parcels
- 1. "Tieduprightnow" Released: April 2018; 2. "Bemyself" Released: July 2018; 3. "Lightenup" Released: September 2018; 4. "Withorwithout" Released: October 2018; 5. "Tape" Released: April 2019

Parcels is the debut studio album by Australian electropop band Parcels. The album was announced in September 2018, alongside the album's third single "Lightenup" and released on 12 October 2018.

The album was supported by a tour across North America, Europe and Australia between September 2018 and March 2019.

== Reception ==
Professional ratings
Aggregate scores
Source	Rating
Metacritic	73/100
Review scores
Source	Rating
NME	5/5 stars

Thomas Smith from NME said "Parcels manages to be an album that transcends elements from across pop history while still sounding remarkably fresh." Smith called it "a debut album that's cheeky, timeless and devilishly catchy."

Beat Magazine said "Channelling inspiration from the likes of Daft Punk, The Beach Boys, and Chic, Parcels is a supersonic, psychedelic adventure. It's both chill enough to put on while relaxing, but poppy enough to get up and have a jive along with, and whichever way you look at it, it makes you feel all nice and warm inside."

Jeremy Williams-Chalmers from Essentially Pop called the album " a stunning debut release, which will appeal to music listeners of all ages. Understated disco at its finest."

== Track listing ==
Parcels track listing
No.	Title	Writer(s)	Producer(s)	Length
1.	"Comedown"	Jules Crommelin; Patrick Hetherington; Noah Hill; Anatole Serret; Louis Swain	Jules Crommelin; Patrick Hetherington; Noah Hill; Anatole Serret; Louis Swain	3:08
2.	"Lightenup"	Crommelin; Hetherington; Hill; Serret; Swain	Crommelin; Hetherington; Hill; Serret; Swain	3:57
3.	"Withorwithout"	Crommelin; Hetherington; Hill; Serret; Swain	Crommelin; Hetherington; Hill; Serret; Swain	3:25
4.	"Tape"	Crommelin; Hetherington; Hill; Serret; Swain	Crommelin; Hetherington; Hill; Serret; Swain	3:43
5.	"Everyroad"	Crommelin; Hetherington; Hill; Serret; Swain	Crommelin; Hetherington; Hill; Serret; Swain	8:35
6.	"Yourfault"	Crommelin; Hetherington; Hill; Serret; Swain	Crommelin; Hetherington; Hill; Serret; Swain	3:39
7.	"Closetowhy"	Crommelin; Hetherington; Hill; Serret; Swain	Crommelin; Hetherington; Hill; Serret; Swain	5:30
8.	"IknowhowIfeel"	Crommelin; Hetherington; Hill; Serret; Swain	Crommelin; Hetherington; Hill; Serret; Swain	5:27
9.	"Exotica"	Crommelin; Hetherington; Hill; Serret; Swain	Crommelin; Hetherington; Hill; Serret; Swain	5:12
10.	"Tieduprightnow"	Crommelin; Hetherington; Hill; Serret; Swain	Crommelin; Hetherington; Hill; Serret; Swain	3:01
11.	"Bemyself"	Crommelin; Hetherington; Hill; Serret; Swain	Crommelin; Hetherington; Hill; Serret; Swain	2:27
12.	"Credits" (featuring Dean Dawson)	Crommelin; Hetherington; Hill; Serret; Swain	Crommelin; Hetherington; Hill; Serret; Swain	3:36
Total length:				51:45

== Charts ==
Chart (2018)	Peak position
Australian Albums (ARIA)	94
Belgian Albums (Ultratop Wallonia)	200
French Albums (SNEP)	49
German Albums (Offizielle Top 100)	48
Swiss Albums (Schweizer Hitparade)	63
UK Sales chart (OCC)	61

== Certifications ==
Region	Certification	Certified units/sales
France (SNEP)	Gold	50,000^{‡}
^{‡} Sales+streaming figures based on certification alone.
