= Loved (Parcels album) =

Studio album by Parcels
- Released: 12 September 2025
- Genres: Electropop; funk; R&B
- Length: 45:47
- Label: Because
- Producers: Jules Crommelin; Patrick Hetherington

Parcels chronology
Live Vol. 2 (2023)	Loved (2025)

Singles from Loved
- 1. "Leaveyourlove" Released: 27 November 2024; 2. "Safeandsound" Released: 12 March 2025; 3. "Yougotmefeeling" Released: 6 May 2025; 4. "Summerinlove" Released: 1 August 2025; 5. "Sorry" Released: 12 September 2025

Loved (stylised in all caps) is the third studio album by Australian electropop band Parcels. It was released on 12 September 2025, through Because Music.

The album was nominated for the 2026 NSW Music Prize.

== Background ==
Loved is described as the album of unity. In an interview for Rolling Stone Australia, the band explained the album is "a personal, yet celebratory journey", further stating, "It's very internal for all of us, so personal and so deep, which is sometimes quite uncomfortable. But I guess that's what Parcels is — at least at the moment — all of us having that individual journey, then trying to make a space so we can funnel everybody's experiences into the same world and express it as a celebration."

== Critical reception ==
Professional ratings
Review scores
Source	Rating
AllMusic	4/5 stars
Dork	4/5
The Line of Best Fit	8/10

Neive McCarthy from Dork said "Parcels are looser and more relaxed than ever before – they lean into each track fully, letting it take them wherever it needs. The palette of sounds are more diverse than ever, and there is an unpolished quality to the record that makes it feel warmer and more resonant." McCarthy added, "They've tried on different versions of themselves across over a decade as a band, but the iteration of them on Loved feels like the truest yet – it's sincere and honest, and fundamentally, celebratory."

Chris Connor from The Line of Best Fit described the album as "a richly rewarding record that showcases their seemingly disparate influences and channels them into a funk-infused melting pot."

== Track listing ==
All tracks are produced by Jules Crommelin and Patrick Hetherington.

Loved track listing
No.	Title	Writer(s)	Length
1.	"Tobeloved"	Jules Crommelin; Patrick Hetherington	4:06
2.	"Ifyoucall"	Crommelin; Hetherington	4:02
3.	"Safeandsound"	Crommelin; Hetherington	4:38
4.	"Sorry"	Crommelin; Hetherington	3:18
5.	"Yougotmefeeling"	Noah Hill	3:04
6.	"Leaves"	Crommelin; Hetherington	3:42
7.	"Everybodyelse"	Crommelin; Hetherington	3:39
8.	"Summerinlove"	Crommelin; Hetherington	4:32
9.	"Leaveyourlove"	Crommelin; Louie Swain; Hill; Hetherington	3:52
10.	"Thinkaboutit"	Anatole Serret; Crommelin; Swain; Hill; Hetherington	2:52
11.	"Finallyover"	Crommelin; Hetherington	3:12
12.	"Iwanttobeyourlightagain"	Crommelin; Hetherington	5:03
Total length:			45:47

== Charts ==
Weekly chart performance for Loved
Chart (2025)	Peak position
Australian Albums (ARIA)	24
Belgian Albums (Ultratop Flanders)	110
Belgian Albums (Ultratop Wallonia)	87
Dutch Albums (Album Top 100)	78
French Albums (SNEP)	38
German Albums (Offizielle Top 100)	53
Portuguese Albums (AFP)	12
Scottish Albums (Official Charts)	73
Swiss Albums (Schweizer Hitparade)	22
UK Albums Sales (OCC)	20
UK Independent Albums (Official Charts)	6

Year-end chart performance for Loved
Chart (2025)	Position
Australian Artist Albums (ARIA)	38

== Release history ==
Release dates and formats for Loved
Region	Date	Format(s)	Label	Catalogue	Ref.
Various	12 September 2025	CD; LP; digital download; streaming	Because	BEC5615757 / BEC5615760	
