= Big Tidda =

EP by Barkaa
- Released: 21 August 2024
- Length: 21:20
- Label: Bad Apples Music
- Producers: Nerve, jayteehazard

Barkaa chronology
Blak Matriarchy (2021)	Big Tidda (2024)

Singles from Big Tidda
- 1. "We Up" Released: 15 March 2024; 2. "Preach" Released: 12 June 2024

Big Tidda is the second extended play by Australian musical artist Barkaa. The EP was announced in early August 2024 released on 30 August 2024. IN a press statement, the artist said the EP is "a celebration of Blak joy, the importance of Blak love and just feeling yourself."

At the 2025 ARIA Music Awards, the album won the ARIA Award for Best Hip Hop Release.

At the inaugural NSW Music Prize in 2025, the EP won NSW First Nations Music Prize..

== Track listing ==
No.	Title	Writer(s)	Length
1.	"Preach"	Chloe Quayle, Toby Nicholls	2:39
2.	"Big Mood" (featuring Kobie Dee)	Quayle, Kobie Duncan, Jacob Turier	3:09
3.	"Boujee & Brown" (featuring Say True God?)	Quayle, Nixon Leighton Jackson, Nicholls	2:25
4.	"We Up"	Quayle, Turier	3:12
5.	"Alinta"	Quayle, Turier	3:05
6.	"Fruition" (featuring Minty)	Quayle, Caleb Sutherland, Turier	3:13
7.	"T.I.D.D.A. Freestyle"	Quayle, Turier	3:35
Total length:			21:20

== Charts ==
Chart performance for Big Tidda
Chart (2024)	Peak position
Australian Hip Hip/R&B Albums(ARIA)	26
