= Speed (Australian band) =

Australian hardcore punk band

- Origin: Sydney, Australia
- Genres: Hardcore punk; metalcore; tough guy hardcore; beatdown hardcore
- Years active: 2019–present
- Labels: Last Ride; Flatspot
- Spinoffs: Secret World
- Spinoff of: Endless Heights, Relentless, Wreath
- Members: Jem Siow; Aaron Siow; Josh Clayton; Dennis Vichidvongsa; Kane Vardon

Speed (stylised as "SPEED") are an Australian hardcore punk band from Sydney. Formed in 2019, the band consists of lead vocalist Jem Siow, guitarists Joshua Clayton and Dennis Vichidvongsa, bassist Aaron Siow, and drummer Kane Vardon.

== History ==
In the late 2000s, Jem Siow formed the band Your Ghost Is a Gift with four high school friends, including lead vocalist Joel Martorana. Siow was the band's lead guitarist. The band changed its name to Endless Heights in 2009. They released two studio albums and five extended plays (EPs), and toured with bands such as Taking Back Sunday, Hellions, and Hands Like Houses. Endless Heights broke up in 2019. Speed guitarist Dennis Vichidvongsa and drummer Kane Vardon were previously members of Sydney hardcore band Relentless.

In 2019, after the breakup of Endless Heights, Siow recruited his brother Aaron Siow, Josh Clayton, Dennis Vichidvongsa, and Kane Vardon to form Speed. In October 2019, Speed released a demo EP on Last Ride Records. The following April, the group was signed by Flatspot Records. In June 2020, the band released the single "A Dumb Dog Gets Flogged", which Jem Siow said "was born in reaction to the failed leadership of our government during the 2019–2020 Australian bushfires. Empathy and compassion should always be the premise for meaningful action." the two-track single 2020 Flex, Later that month, they released the two-song EP 2020 Flex, consisting of "A Dumb Dog Gets Flogged" and "Devil U Know".

In June 2021, the band released "We See U" as part of the hardcore punk compilation, This Is Australia Vol 2. In May 2022, the band announced the release of Gang Called Speed as their official debut EP, alongside its lead single "Not That Nice" which addresses Asian hate crimes. They said, "Even though this is our first EP, [we're] sort of approaching it almost like a debut album. That's why it's called Gang Called Speed – this is the identity of the band. This is what we're all about. This is Australian hardcore." Gang Called Speed was released on 24 June 2022 and debuted at number 5 on the ARIA Charts. "Not That Nice" appears on the soundtrack to the video game WWE 2K24, which was curated by the band's friend Post Malone.

In April 2024, Speed announced their debut studio album, Only One Mode, which was released on 12 July. The album won the ARIA Award for Best Hard Rock or Heavy Metal Album at the 2024 ARIA Music Awards. In April 2025, the band became the first Australian hardcore act to ever perform at Coachella.

In October 2025, the group released the EP All My Angels. They also played Tied Down Fest in Detroit that year. In November 2025, the band was awarded the New South Wales Music Prize.

In February 2026, their song "The First Test" was used as the theme for AEW's Grand Slam Australia which was held at Qudos Bank Arena in Sydney.

In April 2026 the band toured the United Kingdom, supported by Bangkok hardcore band Whispers, performing multiple sold-out shows before returning for festivals across the UK and EU, including Reading and Leeds Festivals.

== Musical style and influences ==
Predominantly a hardcore punk band, the band has also been described as tough guy hardcore, beatdown hardcore and metalcore.

Lead vocalist Jem Siow is classically trained, with a degree in classical flute performance from the Sydney Conservatorium of Music. Siow previously worked as a flute teacher for 14 years before performing full-time with Speed from 2023. The band incorporated a flute breakdown into their 2024 single "The First Test". Siow has described playing the flute and playing in hardcore bands as feeling like wearing two different "masks", describing the decision to include the flute in Speed's music as being about "owning that part of [his] identity".

Members of the band have cited musical influences such as Malevolence, Trapped Under Ice, Parkway Drive, Hatebreed, Madball, Biohazard, and Merauder.

== Band members ==
- Jem Siow – lead vocals, flute, occasional bass and lead guitar
- Dennis "D-Cold" Vichidvongsa – lead guitar, backing and occasional lead vocals
- Joshua Clayton – rhythm guitar, backing vocals
- Aaron "Saato" Siow – bass guitar, backing and occasional lead vocals
- Kane Vardon – drums, percussion

== Discography ==
=== Albums ===
List of albums, with release date and label shown
| Title | Details | Peak chart positions |
| Title | Details | AUS |
|---|---|---|
| Only One Mode | Released: 12 July 2024; Label: Last Ride (LRR58), Flatspot; Formats: CD, LP, digital download | 10 |

=== EPs ===
List of extended plays, with release date, label, and Australian chart positions shown
| Title | Details | Peak chart positions |
| Title | Details | AUS |
|---|---|---|
| 2020 Flex | Released: 19 June 2020; Label: Last Ride Records (LRR26), Flatspot Records (FSR53); Formats: CD, 7-inch EP digital download | — |
| Gang Called Speed | Released: 24 June 2022; Label: Last Ride Records (LRR41), Flatspot Records (FSR61); Formats: CD, LP, digital download | 5 |
| All My Angels | Released: 24 October 2025; Label: Last Ride Records (LRR71CD); Formats: CD, digital download | TBA |

=== Demo albums ===
List of demo albums, with release date and label shown
| Title | Details |
|---|---|
| Demo 19 | Released: 9 October 2019; Label: Last Ride Records (LRR22); Formats: Digital download, Cassette |

=== Singles ===
List of singles, with year released and album name shown
| Title | Year | Album |
|---|---|---|
| "A Dumb Dog Gets Flogged" | 2020 | 2020 Flex |
| "We See U" | 2021 | This Is Australia Vol 2 (compilation) |
| "Not That Nice" | 2022 | Gang Called Speed |
| "Move" | 2022 | Gang Called Speed |
| "One Blood We Bleed" | 2022 | The Extermination Vol. 4 (compilation) |
| "Real Life Love" | 2024 | Only One Mode |
| "The First Test" | 2024 | Only One Mode |
| "Don't Need" | 2024 | Only One Mode |
| "Peace" | 2025 | All My Angels |
| "Ain't My Game" | 2025 | All My Angels |

== Awards and nominations ==
=== APRA Music Awards ===
The APRA Music Awards were established by Australasian Performing Right Association (APRA) in 1982 to honour the achievements of songwriters and music composers, and to recognise their song writing skills, sales and airplay performance, by its members annually.

| Year | Nominee / work | Award | Result | Ref. |
|---|---|---|---|---|
| 2025 | "Real Life Love" | Most Performed Hard Rock / Heavy Metal Work | Nominated | |

=== ARIA Music Awards ===
The ARIA Music Awards are a set of annual ceremonies presented by Australian Recording Industry Association (ARIA), which recognise excellence, innovation, and achievement across all genres of the music of Australia. They commenced in 1987.

| Year | Nominee / work | Award | Result | Ref. |
|---|---|---|---|---|
| 2024 | Only One Mode | Best Group | Nominated | |
| 2024 | Only One Mode | Best Hard Rock or Heavy Metal Album | Won | |
| 2024 | "Real Life Love" by Speed, Jack Rudder, Jem Siow, Thomas Elliot | Best Video | Nominated | |
| 2025 | Speed Australia Tour '25 | Best Australian Live Act | Nominated | |

=== J Awards ===
The J Awards are an annual series of Australian music awards that were established by the Australian Broadcasting Corporation's youth-focused radio station Triple J. They commenced in 2005.

| Year | Nominee / work | Award | Result | Ref. |
|---|---|---|---|---|
| 2022 | Speed | Unearthed Artist of the Year | Nominated | |
| 2024 | Only One Mode | Australian Album of the Year | Nominated | |
| 2024 | Speed | Australian Live Act of the Year | Nominated | |
| 2025 | Speed | Australian Live Act of the Year | Won | |

=== NSW Music Prize ===
The NSW Music Prize aims to "celebrate, support and incentivise" the NSW's most talented artists, with "the aim of inspiring the next generations of stars". It commenced in 2025.

| Year | Nominee / work | Award | Result | Ref. |
|---|---|---|---|---|
| 2025 | Only One Mode | NSW Music Prize | Won | |
| 2025 | Speed | NSW Breakthrough Artist of the Year | Nominated | |
| 2026 | All My Angels | NSW Music Prize | Nominated | |

=== Rolling Stone Australia Awards ===
The Rolling Stone Australia Awards are awarded annually in January or February by the Australian edition of Rolling Stone magazine for outstanding contributions to popular culture in the previous year.

| Year | Nominee / work | Award | Result | Ref. |
|---|---|---|---|---|
| 2025 | Speed | Rolling Stone Readers Award | Shortlisted | |
