= Tieduprightnow =

Single by Parcels
- Released: 27 April 2018
- Studio: Bakermoon Studios, Berlin
- Length: 4:10
- Label: Because Music, Kitsuné Musique
- Songwriters: Jules Crommelin, Patrick Hetherington, Noah Hill, Anatole Serret and Louie Swain
- Producer: Parcels

Parcels singles chronology
"Overnight" (2017)	"Tieduprightnow" (2018)	"Bemyself" (2018)

Music video
- "Tied Up Right Now" on YouTube

"Tieduprightnow" is a song by Australian group Parcels. It was released in April 2018 as the lead single from their self-titled debut studio album.

== Reception ==
Chris DeVille from Stereogum called the song "soft-rockin' beach party jam" and a song that "could easily be an '80s TV theme song".

Thomas Smith from NME said "the track straddles the line between being a classy slow-jam and a pool party soundtrack."

== Track listing ==
digital single
No.	Title	Length
1.	"Tieduprightnow"	4:10

CD single (Because Music)
No.	Title	Length
1.	"Tieduprightnow"	4:10
2.	"Tieduprightnow" (radio edit)	2:55

7" single (Because Music – BEC5543910, Kitsuné Musique – KB7V-268)
No.	Title	Length
1.	"Tieduprightnow"	4:10
2.	"Tape"	3:44

== Charts ==
Chart performance for "Tieduprightnow"
Chart (2018–2019)	Peak position
Mexico Ingles Airplay (Billboard)	48
UK Physical Singles Chart (OCC)	79

== Certifications ==
Certifications for "Tieduprightnow"
Region	Certification	Certified units/sales
Australia (ARIA)	Gold	35,000^{‡}
France (SNEP)	Gold	100,000^{‡}
New Zealand (RMNZ)	Platinum	30,000^{‡}
United Kingdom (BPI)	Silver	200,000^{‡}
United States (RIAA)	Gold	500,000^{‡}
^{‡} Sales+streaming figures based on certification alone.
