= Kill the Dead =

Studio album by 3%
- Released: 9 August 2024
- Length: 42:10
- Labels: 1788; Virgin
- Producers: Adit Jonce; Encore; Jujo; Nooky; One Above; R.F.P.; Tasker

Singles from Kill the Dead
- 1. "Our People" Released: 17 October 2023; 2. "Sleezy Steezy Cool" Released: 5 February 2024; 3. "Land Back" Released: 5 April 2024; 4. "Calling Home" Released: 14 May 2024; 5. "Won't Stop" Released: 5 July 2024; 6. "Prisoner" Released: 4 October 2024

Kill the Dead is the debut studio album by Australian trio Angus Field, Nooky and Dallas Woods, credited as 3%. The album was announced on 11 June 2024 and performed in full at Vivid Sydney on 14 June 2024, before being released on 9 August 2024.

The song "Our People" won Song of the Year at the National Indigenous Music Awards 2024.

At the 2024 ARIA Music Awards, the album won Best Hip Hop/Rap Release and Best Cover Art. 3% were nominated for Best Group and Michael Gudinski Breakthrough Artist.

At the 2024 J Awards, the album was nominated for Australian Album of the Year. The album was shorted listed for Best LP/EP at the 2025 Rolling Stone Australia Awards.

At the National Indigenous Music Awards 2025 the album was nominated for Album of the Year.

== Background ==
The trio's name 3% represents the Australian population that are Aboriginal and Torres Strait Islanders.

Dallas Woods explained the album title, saying: "We never kill the dead because they live on in us. They remain in spirit. All the people that they tried to kill – the clans, they couldn't kill, we still exist. We have survived. So you could never kill the dead, because we're still alive. Their spirit will always be alive. They might be no longer here, but they are always here spiritually."

== Artwork ==
The album's artwork was completed by Aboriginal artist Daniel Boyd and features a recreation of a gesture by Australian rules footballer Nicky Winmar during a match in 1993. 3% said "We chose this image, because that was a moment: when Nicky Winmar stood up against racism and echoed the statement he was Blak and proud. We thought the image resonated so much with what we were doing on the album. Kill the Dead is 3%s Uncle Nicky moment – we bare our flesh and blood on this record and it is undeniably Blak and proud."

== Release ==
The album was announced on 11 June 2024 and performed in full at Vivid Sydney on 14 June 2024. Across July 2024, there were listening parties across Australia.

Kill the Dead was released on 9 August 2024.

== Critical reception ==
Professional ratings
Review scores
Source	Rating
Rolling Stone Australia	5/5 stars

Sosefina Fuamoli from Rolling Stone Australia gave the album a perfect score, saying, "Although covering weighty themes of reclamation, Indigenous deaths in custody and closing the gap, Kill the Dead is more than an album that is built on songs and stories of protest. It's also a beautifully celebratory moment for Blak musicians and artists. The arrival of this album is poignant, as the Australian music space is being flooded with the talents of a new generation of Blak excellence."

David James Young from NME said "Kill the Dead is all-guns-blazing hip-hop that speaks directly and passionately about the issues affecting Aboriginal people in Australia – from institutionalised racism to police brutality." Young called the trio "the most important new voice in Australian hip-hop".

== Singles ==
The trio's debut single "Our People" was released on 17 October 2023. The song samples "My People" and features The Presets. The song is about Indigenous youth incarceration. The group said "We want for people to understand how our first single speaks to the serious issue of over 400 Black deaths in custody with no convictions. Kids as young as 10 years old locked up in criminal institutions – to be traumatised and damaged by the system, forever." The Nick Rae, Brayden Carter, Corey Webster directed music video was nominated for Australian Video of the Year at the 2023 J Awards. The song was also nominated for Song of the Year at the National Indigenous Music Awards 2024, and won the award on 9 August 2024.

"Sleezy Steezy Cool" featuring Tia Gostelow was released on 5 February 2024 as the album's second single. Joseph Guenzler from National Indigenous Times said "'Sleezy Steezy Cool' blends smooth pop sounds with sharp guitar licks and an incredible performance from Tia Gostelow. Her easygoing vocal hook sets the stage for Nooky, Woods, and Fields to deliver their verses beneath a snappy beat." Tammy Moir from Happy Mag TV called the song a "genre-bending blend that seamlessly interweaves pop hooks with sharp guitar licks and a head-nodding beat."

"Land Back" featuring Say True God? and Denni was released on 5 April 2024 as the album's third single.

"Calling Home" was released on 14 May 2024. The song samples "Royal Telephone" by Jimmy Little and features Nookys daughter, Calula Webster. Angus Fields said the song is "about mental health, missing your loved ones and wanting to get home".

"Won't Stop" featuring Jessica Mauboy was released as the album's fifth single on 5 July 2024. Upon release, Nooky said "For me, the song's a real positive one... I wanted to look into the heart and history that we carry as Blakfellas and acknowledge that there is a lot of pain and trauma that is embedded within our people. But we also wanted to show the strength, perseverance, and resilience that lives in the spirit that we all carry."

- "Prisoner" was released on 4 October 2024 as the sixth single. A video was released a day earlier.

== Track listing ==
Kill the Dead track listing
No.	Title	Writer(s)	Producer(s)	Length
1.	"Kids You Couldn't Kill"	Angus Field; Corey Webster; Dallas Woods; Miles Devine; William Gunns; Cameron Whipp	Nooky	3:06
2.	"BNP"	Field; Webster; Woods; Julian Jovanovski	Jujo	2:47
3.	"Land Back" (with Say True God? and Denni)	Field; Webster; Woods; Gunns; Nixon Jackson; Jesse Morris; Rory Peckham; Denni Proctor; Max Wonnenberg	Nooky; R.F.P.; JM^{[a]}; Rizzo^{[a]}	2:42
4.	"Pay the Rent"	Field; Webster; Woods; Thom Crawford; Adit Gauchan; Jonathan Graham; Gunns; Daniel Neurath	Adit Jonce	2:28
5.	"Invasion"	Field; Webster; Woods; Gunns	Nooky	2:50
6.	"Blak Australia Policy" (with Marlon Motlop)	Field; Webster; Woods; Gunns; Chris Selfe	Encore	3:22
7.	"Prisoner"	Webster; Woods; Andrew Burford; Tia Gostelow	One Above	2:54
8.	"Die by the Sword"	Webster; Woods; Caleb Tasker	Tasker	2:43
9.	"Lovin' On Me"	Webster; Woods; Buford; Gostelow	One Above	2:47
10.	"Sleezy Steezy Cool" (with Tia Gostelow)	Webster; Woods; Burford; Gostelow	One Above	3:00
11.	"Coming Home" (featuring Calula Webster)	Field; Webster; Woods; Gunns; Robert Iredale; James Saunders; Tasker; Thomas Tycho	Nooky; Tasker	3:45
12.	"Higher"	Webster; Woods; Burford; Gunns	One Above	2:50
13.	"Won't Stop" (with Jessica Mauboy)	Webster; Woods; Danzal Baker; Burford; Madeline Crabtree	One Above	3:01
14.	"Our People" (featuring the Presets)	Field; Webster; Woods; Julian Hamilton; Kimberley Moyes; Tasker	Tasker	3:55
Total length:				42:10

== Personnel ==
3%

- Angus Field – vocals
- Nooky – vocals (all tracks), mixing (track 3)
- Dallas Woods – vocals

Additional musicians

- Billy Gunns – drums (tracks 1, 5, 12), synthesizer (1, 3); guitar, sound effects (5); drum programming, strings (6)
- Cameron Whipp – bass (track 1)
- Miles Devine – bass programming (track 1)
- Julian Jovanovski – keyboards, programming (track 2)
- Jesse Morris – programming (track 3)
- Max Wonnenberg – programming (track 3)
- Rory Fraser Peckham – programming (track 3)
- Denni – vocals (track 3)
- Say True God? – vocals (track 3)
- Thom Crawford – guitar (track 4)
- Adit Gauchan – programming (track 4)
- Jonathan Graham – programming (track 4)
- Marlon Motlop – vocals (track 6)
- One Above – bass, drums, guitar, percussion, synthesizer (tracks 7, 9, 12, 13); keyboards, organ (9, 12, 13); horn (13)
- Andrew Burford – bass, drums, keyboards, organ, percussion, synthesizer (track 10)
- Tia Gostelow – vocals (track 10)
- Caleb Tasker – bass, guitar (tracks 11, 14); drum programming, keyboards (11)
- Calula Webster – vocals (track 11)
- Jessica Mauboy – vocals (track 13)

Technical

- Leon Zervos – mastering
- Billy Gunns – mixing (all tracks), engineering (1–6, 8, 11, 12)
- Encore – engineering (tracks 6, 9)
- One Above – engineering (tracks 7, 9, 10, 13)
- Tasker – engineering (tracks 8, 14)

== Charts ==
Chart performance for Kill the Dead
Chart (2024)	Peak position
Australian Albums (ARIA)	12
Australian Hip Hop/R&B Albums (ARIA)	2
