= Don West (singer) =

Australian blues musician and model

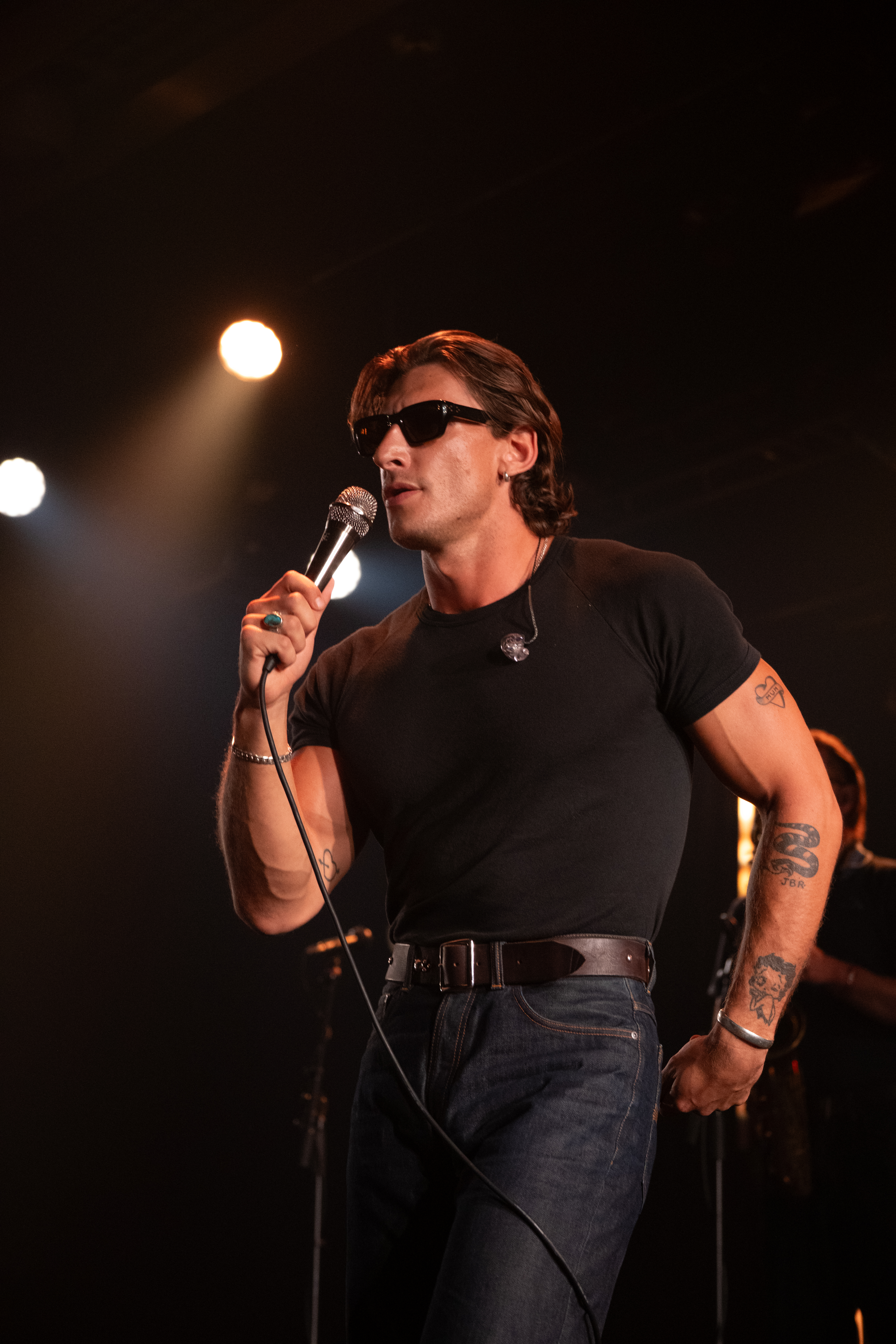
- West in 2026

Background information
- Born: Don West
- Origin: Sydney, Australia
- Genre: soul
- Occupations: Singer; songwriter; model
- Instruments: Vocals; guitar
- Years active: 2019–present
- Label: Kobalt Music Group (2025+)
- Website: www.don-west.com

Don West is an Australian soul music musician and model.

West released Give Me All Your Love in November 2025, which peaked at number 25 on the ARIA Albums Chart.

== Life and career ==
=== 2019–present ===
In 2019, West opened for Lime Cordiale without having released a song at that time. Shortly after, West uploaded the track "Money" onto triple j Unearthed which was followed in 2020 with "Equaliser" which featured guest vocals of Hayley Mary.

In November 2024, West released his debut EP and has appeared at festivals including SXSW Sydney and Byron Bay Bluesfest.

On 7 November 2025, West released his debut album, Give Me All Your Love, which peaked at number 25 on the ARIA Albums Chart.

In December 2025, It was confirmed that West had signed with Kobalt Music Group.

== Discography ==
=== Studio albums ===
List of studio albums, with release date, label and selected chart position shown
Title	Album details	Peak chart positions
Title	Album details	AUS
Give Me All Your Love	Released: 14 November 2025; Label: Don West, Mandatory Music (DW-LP001); Format: LP, digital download, streaming	25

=== Extended plays ===
List of EPs, with release date, label and selected chart position shown
Title	EP details
Don West	Released: 27 November 2024; Label: Don West (LPMVM 2313); Format: digital, LP

== Awards and nominations ==
=== AIR Awards ===
The Australian Independent Record Awards (commonly known informally as AIR Awards) is an annual awards night to recognise, promote and celebrate the success of Australia's Independent Music sector.

Year	Nominee / work	Award	Result	Ref.
2025	Don West	Best Independent Soul/R&B Album or EP	Nominated	
2026	Give Me All Your Love	Best Independent Soul/R&B Album or EP	Nominated	

=== APRA Awards ===
The APRA Awards are held in Australia and New Zealand by the Australasian Performing Right Association to recognise songwriting skills, sales and airplay performance by its members annually.

Year	Nominee / work	Award	Result	Ref.
2025	"Small Change" (Don West, Nathan Hawes)	Most Performed R&B / Soul Work	Nominated	
2026	"Julia" (Don West, Nathan Hawes, William Endicott, Zac Olsen, Jacob Parks)	Most Performed R&B / Soul Work	Nominated	

=== J Awards ===
The J Awards are an annual series of Australian music awards that were established by the Australian Broadcasting Corporation's youth-focused radio station Triple J. They commenced in 2005.

Year	Nominee / work	Award	Result	Ref.
2025	Don West	Unearthed Artist of the Year	Nominated	

=== NSW Music Prize ===
The NSW Music Prize aims to "celebrate, support and incentivise" the NSW's most talented artists, with "the aim of inspiring the next generations of stars". It commenced in 2025.

Year	Nominee / work	Award	Result	Ref.
2025	Don West	NSW Breakthrough Artist of the Year	Nominated	
2026	Give Me All Your Love	NSW Music Prize	Nominated	

=== Vanda & Young Global Songwriting Competition ===
The Vanda & Young Global Songwriting Competition is an annual competition that "acknowledges great songwriting whilst supporting and raising money for Nordoff-Robbins" and is coordinated by Albert Music and APRA AMCOS. It commenced in 2009.

Year	Nominee / work	Award	Result	Ref.
2025	"Small Change" (Nathan Hawes)	Vanda & Young Global Songwriting Competition	Finalist	
