= 3% (group) =

Australian supergroup

- Years active: 2023–present
- Labels: 1788; Virgin
- Members: Nooky; Dallas Woods; Mi-kaisha Masella
- Past members: Angus Field; Teon Lolesio

3% is an Australian supergroup formed by rappers Nooky and Dallas Woods, originally with vocalist Angus Field. The name refers to the percentage of the Australian population that are Aboriginal and Torres Strait Islanders.

The group released their debut single "Our People" in October 2023, which samples The Presets' "My People", and released their debut studio album Kill the Dead on 9 August 2024.

To celebrate NAIDOC Week in July 2025, the group released the stand-alone single titled "Our Greats" with an accompanying music video starring Cathy Freeman. This was a followed by "Running Through My Head" the same month, featuring vocalist Sarah Wolfe. The song samples t.A.T.u.'s "All the Things She Said".

In October 2025, the group released the single "These Days". Later that year, Field confirmed his departure from the group; he was temporarily replaced by Teon Lolesio, who performs under the moniker Turquoise Prince. In September 2026, 3% confirmed the addition of vocalist Mi-kaisha Masella to the group.

== Discography ==
=== Studio albums ===
List of studio albums, with release date, label, and selected chart positions shown
Title	Album details	Peak chart positions
Title	Album details	AUS
Kill the Dead	Released: 9 August 2024; Label: 1788, Virgin (3PCT01); Format: CD, LP, digital	12

== Awards and nominations ==
=== AIR Awards ===
The Australian Independent Record Awards (commonly known informally as AIR Awards) is an annual awards night to recognise, promote and celebrate the success of Australia's Independent Music sector.

Year	Nominee / work	Award	Result	Ref.
2025	3%	Breakthrough Independent Artist of the Year	Nominated	
2025	Kill the Dead	Best Independent Hip Hop Album or EP	Nominated	
2025	"Won't Stop" (featuring Jessica Mauboy)	Independent Music Video of the Year	Won	

=== APRA Music Awards ===
The APRA Music Awards were established by Australasian Performing Right Association (APRA) in 1982 to honour the achievements of songwriters and music composers, and to recognise their song writing skills, sales and airplay performance, by its members annually.

Year	Nominee / work	Award	Result	Ref.
2025	"Won't Stop" (featuring Jessica Mauboy) (Danzal Baker, Andrew Burford, Madeline Crabtree, Corey Webster, Dallas Woods)	Song of the Year	Shortlisted	

=== ARIA Music Awards ===
The ARIA Music Awards are a set of annual ceremonies presented by Australian Recording Industry Association (ARIA), which recognise excellence, innovation, and achievement across all genres of the music of Australia. They commenced in 1987.

Year	Nominee / work	Award	Result	Ref.
2024	Kill the Dead	Best Group	Nominated	
2024	Kill the Dead	Michael Gudinski Breakthrough Artist	Nominated	
2024	Kill the Dead	Best Hip Hop/Rap Release	Won	
2024	Daniel Boyd and Nomad Create for Kill the Dead	Best Cover Art	Won	
2025	3% – Fox League 2025: Our Greats (Fox Sports Australia)	Best Use of an Australian Recording in an Advertisement	Won	
2026	3%, Fred Leone and Scribe – Fox League 2025: Finals Footy (Fox Sports Australia)	Best Use of an Australian Recording in an Advertisement	Nominated	

=== J Awards ===
The J Awards are an annual series of Australian music awards that were established by the Australian Broadcasting Corporation's youth-focused radio station Triple J. They commenced in 2005.

Year	Nominee / work	Award	Result	Ref.
2024	Kill the Dead	Australian Album of the Year	Nominated	
2024	"Won't Stop" (featuring Jessica Mauboy) Directed by Nick Rae, Jordan Ruyi Blanch	Australian Video of the Year	Nominated	

=== National Indigenous Music Awards ===
The National Indigenous Music Awards is an annual awards ceremony that recognises the achievements of Indigenous Australians in music.

Year	Nominee / work	Award	Result	Ref.
2024	3%	Artist of the Year	Nominated	
2024	"Our People"	Song of the Year	Won	
2025	3%	Artist of the Year	Nominated	
2025	Kill the Dead	Album of the Year	Nominated	
2025	"Won't Stop" (featuring Jessica Mauboy)	Song of the Year	Nominated	
2025	"Won't Stop" (featuring Jessica Mauboy)	Film Clip of the Year	Nominated	
2026	3%	Artist of the Year	Nominated	
2026	"Our Greats"	Film Clip of the Year	Nominated	

=== NSW Music Prize ===
The NSW Music Prize aims to "celebrate, support and incentivise" the NSW's most talented artists, with "the aim of inspiring the next generations of stars". It commenced in 2025.

Year	Nominee / work	Award	Result	Ref.
2025	Kill the Dead	NSW Music Prize	Nominated	
2025	Kill the Dead	NSW First Nations Music Prize	Nominated	
2026	"These Days", "Running Through My Head" & "Our Greats"	NSW First Nations Music Prize	Won	

=== Rolling Stone Australia Awards ===
The Rolling Stone Australia Awards are awarded annually in January or February by the Australian edition of Rolling Stone magazine for outstanding contributions to popular culture in the previous year.

Year	Nominee / work	Award	Result	Ref.
2025	Kill the Dead	Best LP/EP	Shortlisted	
2025	3%	Best New Artist	Won	
