= Daniel Boyd (artist) =

Australian Aboriginal artist (born 1982)

Daniel Boyd (born 1982) is an Australian contemporary artist working in painting, sculpture and installation. He won the Art Gallery of New South Wales' Bulgari Art Award in 2014 and was a finalist for the 2022 Archibald Prize.

== Early life ==
Boyd was born in 1982 in Cairns, Queensland. He is an Indigenous Australian with Kudjala, Ghungalu, Wanggeriburra, Wakka Wakka, Gubbi Gubbi, Kuku Yalanji, Yuggera and Bundjalung – as well as Ni-Vanuatu – heritage. He began drawing as a child, and sold illustrations and paintings of the Great Barrier Reef to tourists. He went on to study at the Australian National University School of Art & Design, graduating in 2005.

== Art career ==
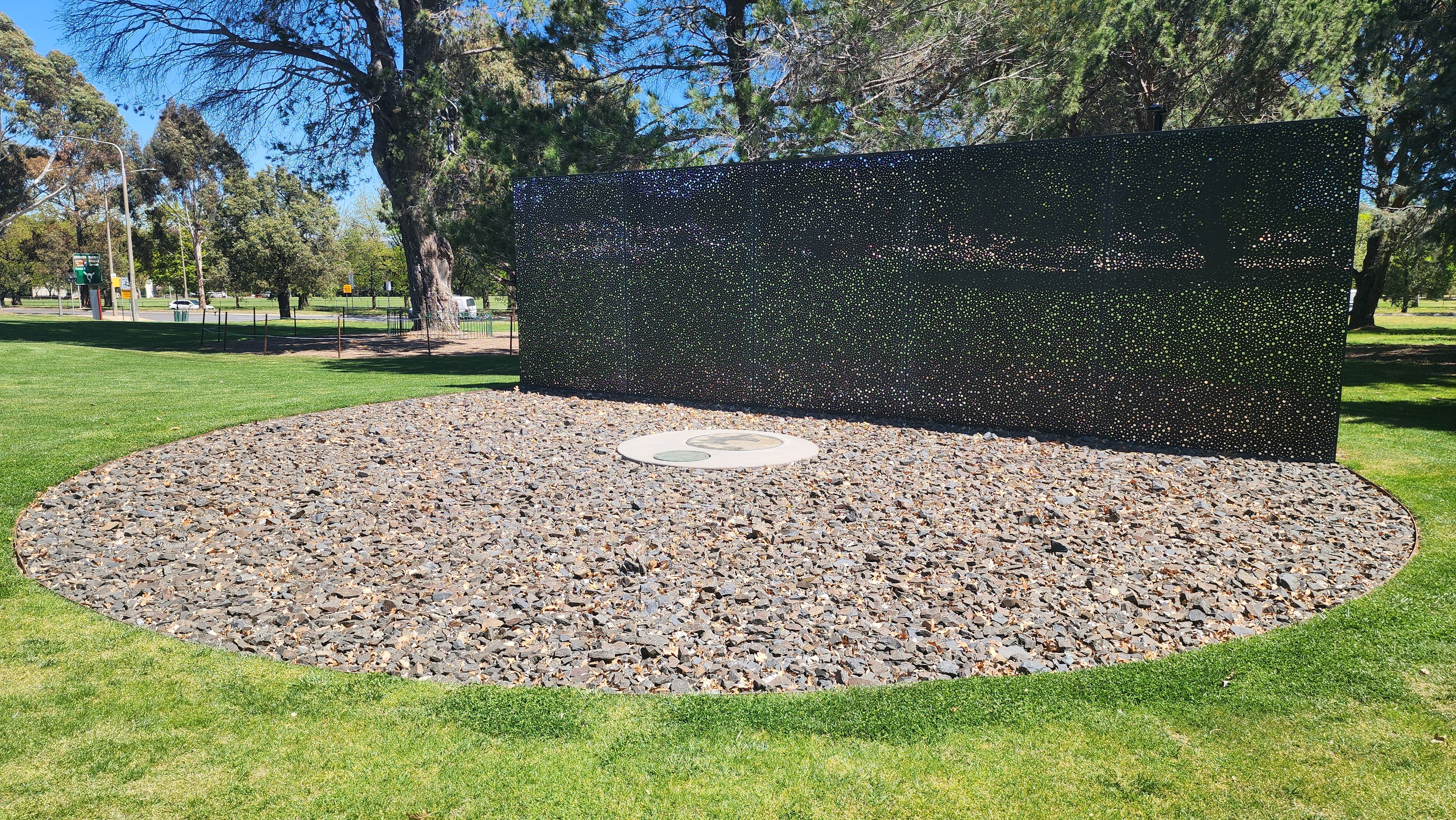
For our Country in the Australian War Memorial sculpture garden

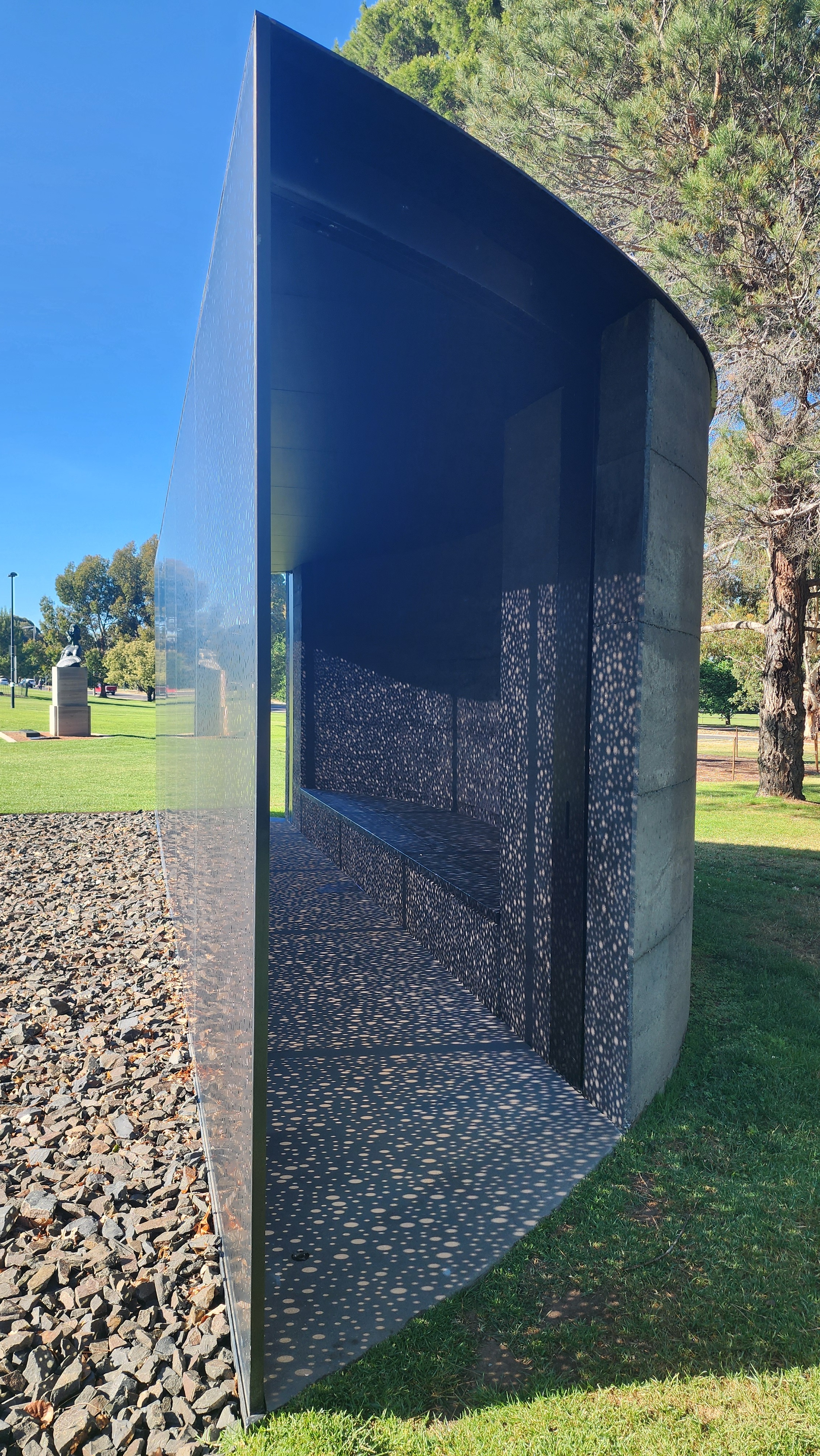
For our Country contemplative space in the Australian War Memorial sculpture garden

Boyd first rose to prominence with his No Beard series of mocking oil portraits of colonial Australian historical figures, which he started in 2005. In 2010 he created Seven Versions of the Sun, a large sculpture commissioned by the Queensland Government and displayed publicly in Kangaroo Point, Brisbane. He became the first indigenous Australian to win the Bulgari Art Award in 2014 with his work Untitled (PW), a depiction of the kidnapping of people from Vanuatu by Australians to serve as labourers. His first solo exhibition in an Australian state art gallery was Daniel Boyd: Treasure Islan at the Art Gallery of New South Wales, from 2022 to 2023. The exhibition featured over 80 of his works from nearly 20 years of his career. He was also a finalist for the Archibald Prize of 2022 with a portrait of the Sydney-based rap group Onefour.

His work satirises the "Eurocentric" view of colonial Australian history, including depictions of James Cook, Joseph Banks, Arthur Phillip and King George III as pirates. While his early work primarily consisted of oil portraits, much of his later work incorporates "dot-like lenses" of different materials affixed to canvas.

In Australia, his work is held in the National Gallery of Australia, the Art Gallery of New South Wales, the Chau Chak Wing Museum, the National Gallery of Victoria, and the Tasmanian Museum and Art Gallery. He has also exhibited at the Natural History Museum in London, the Venice Biennale, the Seoul Museum of Art, the Kochi-Muziris Biennale and the Museu Picasso.

Boyd's artwork features on the cover of 3%'s 2024 album Kill the Dead

== Basketball ==
Boyd is a former semi-professional basketball player, having played in the shooting guard position for the Cairns Marlins in the early 2000s.

== Personal life ==
Boyd lives in Marrickville, Sydney, with his partner and four daughters.

== Awards and nominations ==
=== ARIA Music Award ===
Year	Nominee / work	Award	Result	Ref.
2024	Daniel Boyd and Nomad Create for 3% Kill the Dead	Best Cover Art	Won	
