= Parcels (band) =

Australian electropop band

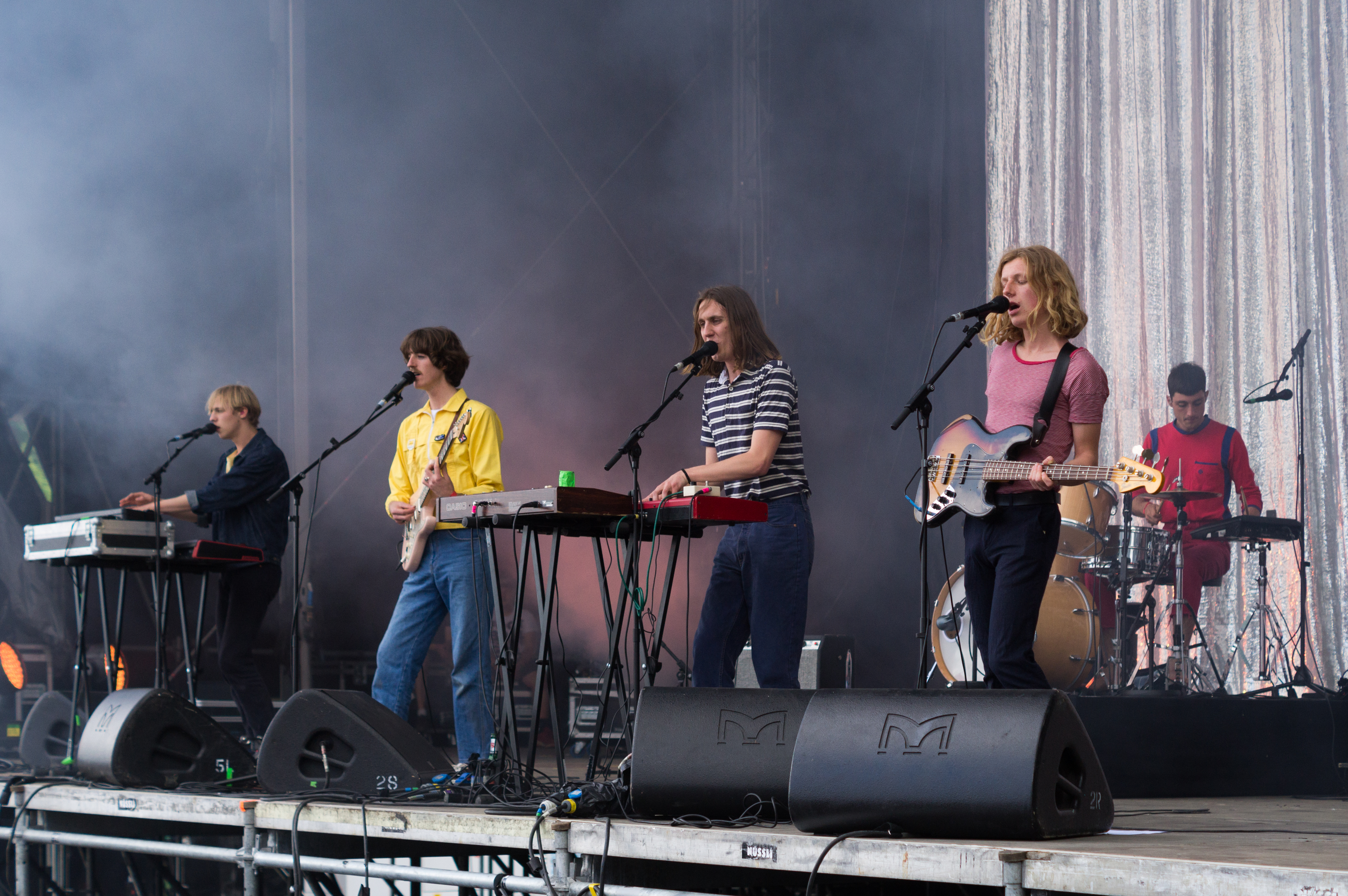
- Parcels performing at the Kosmonaut Festival near Chemnitz, Germany in June, 2017

Background information
- Origin: Byron Bay, New South Wales, Australia
- Genres: Electropop; indietronica; nu-disco; funk; psychedelic pop; soul; alternative dance; indie pop
- Years active: 2014–present
- Label: Because Music
- Members: Louie Swain; Patrick Hetherington; Noah Hill; Anatole "Toto" Serret; Jules Crommelin
- Website: parcelsmusic.com

Parcels are an Australian electropop group consisting of Louie Swain, Patrick Hetherington, Noah Hill, Anatole Serret and Jules Crommelin. The group formed in 2014 in Byron Bay, Australia and moved to Berlin, Germany the same year. Signed to French label Kitsuné, the band rose to prominence after collaborating with the electronic duo Daft Punk on the production and writing of their 2017 single "Overnight".

In 2018, Parcels released their self-titled debut record with singles "Tieduprightnow", "Bemyself", "Lightenup", and "Withorwithout". Parcels describe themselves as "sort of a blend between electropop and disco-soul".

== Music before Parcels and Formation ==
Band members Swain, Hetherington, Hill, Serret and Crommelin all grew up in the beach town of Byron Bay, New South Wales Swain, Hetherington, Hill, and Crommelin attended Cape Byron Rudolf Steiner School in Ewingsdale. Serret went to Byron Bay High School.

The band members were involved in a host of musical projects together before the formation of Parcels, playing music together in and out of bands beginning when they were 13 years old. They played in groups experimenting with genres of funk, folk, metal, and bluegrass. Serret and Crommelin were the only two members of Parcels who had not previously played music together.

Swain and Hetherington had formed as an acoustic folk duo named Louie and Patrick releasing two digital albums via Bandcamp, We Thought a Kitten Might Lift Our Mother's Spirits in April 2013 and We Are Not Convinced There Has Been Any Significant Improvement in May 2014. Swain, Hetherington, Crommelin, and non-Parcels members Merryn Boller and Nick Scales had formed as a roots group, uploading to national youth broadcaster Triple J's unearthed website as The Sugar Spinners in 2013. The Sugar Spinners won the 2013 Byron Bay BluesFest busking competition.

Swain, Hetherington, Serret and Jade Deegan (who has not been in Parcels) formed as a rock, roots band as Lifeline. The band received airplay on Triple J's unearthed station and won a spot at the 2012 Splendour in the Grass line-up. Swain, Hethrington, Hill and aforementioned non-Parcels vocalist Boller formed as Potato Potato receiving airplay on national youth broadcaster Triple J's unearthed station and winning a spot at the 2013 Splendour in the Grass line-up.

In their final year of high school in 2014, Swain, Hetherington, Hill, Serret and Crommelin, formed as Parcels. The story behind the name Parcels differs from source to source. Consistently, the members report having taken the name from an old train sign at Swain's parents' house. In one interview the sign is said to be seen in one of Swain's parent's pastry cafè. Another says that Swain stole the sign from their local train station and hung it in his basement.

== Parcels ==
=== 2014: Byron to Berlin ===
After forming in 2014, the band moved to Berlin. The band notes watching a video in high school of band The Whitest Boy Alive performing in a shop window in Mitte, Germany as influential to the move, saying that the "huge crowd on the street [...] was super cool". Berlin is known for its culture of music creativity being a hub for new wave, techno, electro, and hip-hop in addition to its distinctive subculture flair. The lure of existing in the German city's melting-pot of music and culture has attracted many international artists including David Bowie and Nick Cave, two artists which Parcels has said are influential to their sound.

The band lived in a small one-bedroom apartment for the first three months with "three [band members] on the bed two on the couch". For almost the entire first year in Berlin the band did not play any live shows. Their first performance was put together at a small café in Berlin.

=== 2015–2016: Clockscared EP and working with Daft Punk ===
Parcels released their first EP Clockscared on 2 March 2015 while they were beginning in electronic music. The EP has six listed tracks and was an independent release made with a single condenser mic. The release of Clockscared caught the attention of Parisian label Kitsuné, which signed the band in 2015.

In April 2016, Parcels played their first show in France at Paris' Les Bains bar with Daft Punk in the audience. Daft Punk invited Parcels to their studio. Parcels said that they had not initially planned to create a song with Daft Punk, "it was just like, let's get creative together and see what happens". The band showed Daft Punk an early demo of "Overnight" which they agreed to work on. The track was in production for over the course of a year with many studio trips and months in the studio. In an interview on the process, Parcel's keyboardist Patrick Hetherington said that "First we spent seven days in the studio with them, every day from 12 midday up until 4 in the morning, literally working on it overnight."

On 21 June 2017, Parcels released single "Overnight" with production and co-writing credits from Daft Punk's Guy-Manuel de Homem-Christo and Thomas Bangalter. The single entered the French charts at position 62, and remained for 11 weeks. The song ended up being Daft Punk's final song produced together prior to the duo's split in 2021. The single was not listed on the band's following album Parcels, with the band stating that "including it would've felt dishonest to the rest of the record," noting that the time between recording the tracks on their debut and "Overnight" was two years difference and would taint the historical "snapshot" of the album. "Overnight" was performed on Conan in September 2017 as Parcels' U.S. television debut.

=== 2017: Hideout ===
27 January 2017, Parcels released their second EP Hideout, which was the band's first project with Kitsuné and was entirely computer-produced. Hideout centers around the theme of inner turmoil despite external serenity, which impels the desire to "hide out". The band has linked this concept with their own experience of leaving for Berlin. After the release of Hideout and the exposure of "Overnight," Parcels began to headline their own European shows. They opened for Northern Irish indie band Two Door Cinema Club for their European tour in February 2017 and French pop band Phoenix for their European Tour in September of the same year. Both bands are signed to the Kitsuné label.

=== 2018–2019: Parcels ===
Ahead of their debut album, Parcels in April 2018 released the single "Tieduprightnow", engineered and recorded by British producer, Ed Bentley, at Bakermoon Studios. In July 2018, they released the single "Bemyself", and in September 2018, they released the single "Lightenup"

On 12 October 2018, the band released Parcels, their debut studio album, and including the single 'Tieduprightnow', recorded in Berlin at Bakermoon Studios by Ed Bentley, with Because Music, Kitsuné and Caroline Music. In an interview, Hill said the album's sound was "a little less slick, and a little less disco", "Tieduprightnow" peaked at number 48 on the Mexican Billboard charts for one week. and just missed the Triple J Hottest 100 of 2018, charting at number 103. The single's film clip gave recognition to the band's Byron Bay roots and "play[ed on] the Australian stereotype". The clip was directed by Beatrice Pegard and shows the band driving through their home town and the Australian North Coast, depicting quintessential Australia surf lifestyle and culture. Pegard, for the Australian publication Pilerats, noted the clip was an environmental statement saying, "Northern NSW and Byron Bay are coastal areas that are currently being destroyed by profit-motivated policies and lobbies, and where marine life and ecosystems are disappearing at an alarming rate. The Australian lifestyle as we know it, the joys of summer, of surfing and living by the beach would not be much without its marine ecosystem and wildlife". "Tieduprightnow" was certified Gold in Australia by Australian Recording Industry Association (ARIA) in 2021, and Silver in the United Kingdom by the British Phonographic Industry (BPI) in 2025. On 18 October 2018, Parcels released the "Withorwithoutyou" film clip. The clip starred American horror actress Milla Jovovich and Danish actor Carsten Nørgaard. The band met the former at the Cannes Film Festival after she has admitted she was a fan. The clip paid homage to classic American slasher films.

The fifth single "Tape" is described by the band as a "surf rock inspired electronic pop song about self-affirmation". The film clip premiered 10 April 2019 and was directed by Carmen Crommelin, Jules' sibling. The clip starred Pearl Spring Voss, playing Penelope, a character seen on the Parcels album cover. In the film clip Voss is transported from her bedroom to the crowd of Parcels' live performance of the song. The performance was filmed live at Chicago's Lincoln Hall in one-shot in March 2019. Parcels peaked at number 48 on the official German album charts and number 49 on the French album charts.

=== 2020: Live Vol. 1 ===
On 30 April 2020, Parcels released their live studio album, Live Vol. 1, an 18 track tape recording mixed on an analog console in the Hansa Studios in Berlin, mastered without any edits. Alongside the album, Parcels released instrumental tutorials for the song "IknowhowIfeel" to their Instagram account. Hill said that "it felt very insensitive and not aware to be releasing anything that wasn't in some way connected to the coronavirus ‘cause that was encapsulating everyone's thoughts".

Live Vol. 1 was released with a video of the recording session. Director Carmen Crommelin, also responsible for directing the "Tape" film clip, said in a press release that she "wanted the camera to be both passive and intimate, so you could politely observe from a distance and walk through the room like a friend".

=== 2021–2024: Day/Night ===
On 15 June 2021, Parcels released the single "Free" with an accompanying video directed by Carmen Crommelin. On 28 July 2021, they released the single "Comingback". On 15 September 2021, Parcels released the single "Somethinggreater" alongside an announcement of their second album Day/Night, a double album, released on 5 November 2021. The band also embarked on a world tour in 2022, with legs in North America, Europe and Australia.

=== 2025: Loved ===
In October 2024, Parcels released the single "Leaveyourlove". A month later, they released an EP containing different 'versions' of the song featuring different artists. These artists include fellow Australian band King Stingray, Ximena Sariñana, Rawayana, MARO, Cosmos People, HAOTING, and Robert Owens.

In May 2025, the group released the single "Yougotmefeeling" and announced the release of their third studio album, Loved, which was released on 12 September 2025. The band toured extensively in support of the record, playing shows across North America, South America, Europe and Australia.

== Musical style ==
The band have been compared to musical icons from the 1960s and 70s, including the Beatles and the Beach Boys, drawing upon both their look and sound. Their 1970s uniform aesthetic was chosen as a last-minute dress-up for their performance at the 2016 Lollapalooza afterparty, and became a staple throughout the Live Vol. 1 years.

Parcels' sound has been described as having "an unmistakable penchant for the 70s [...] fusing together the old and the new". In their own words, musically the band draws influence from Steely Dan, Marvin Gaye, The Whitest Boy Alive .The strong rhythm guitar and 3-part vocals recall some of the Bee Gees' 1975–1979 disco era work. Also, a touch of Kraftwerk's early EDM is part of their sound. Ahead of their appearance at the 2025 edition of the festival, the Glastonbury website described Parcels' music as influenced by Daft Punk, Fleetwood Mac, and Chic.

== Notable performances ==
- Glastonbury Festival at the Silver Hayes Pussy Parlure on 25 June 2017
- U.S. television performing "Overnight" on Conan on 12 September 2017
- Interviewed and performed "Overnight", "Anotherclock", and "Older" live on BBC Radio 1, on 8 January 2018
- "Lightenup" live on Neo Magazin Royale on 20 September 2018
- The Metro Theatre in Sydney, Australia on 27 December 2019
- La Cigale in Paris, on 5 November 2021
- "Somethinggreater" from their album Day/Night on The Late Late Show with James Corden on 17 February 2022
- Enmore Theatre in Sydney on 27 October 2022
- Tivoli, Brisbane, on 29 and 30 October 2022
- Red Rocks Amphitheatre in Morrison, Colorado on 17 June 2024
- Festival Estéreo Picnic Inauguration Concert, Teatro Royal Center in Bogotá, Colombia on 26 March 2025
- Festival Estéreo Picnic, Simón Bolívar Park in Bogotá on 28 March 2025; they performed "Leaveyourlove" with a special on-stage appearance by Alberto "Beto" Montenegro, lead vocalist of Rawayana
- Coachella on 11 and 18 April 2025; they performed on the outdoor stage
- Glastonbury Festival 2025 – performed on the West Holts stage on Sunday 29 June
- Tiny Desk Concerts on 22 October 2025 Parcels Tiny Desk Session

== Band members ==
- Anatole "Toto" Serret – percussion
- Jules Crommelin – guitar, vocals
- Louie Swain – keyboard, vocals
- Noah Hill – bass guitar, vocals
- Patrick Hetherington – keyboard, guitar, vocals

== Discography ==
=== Studio albums ===
List of studio albums, with release date, label, and selected chart positions shown
Title	Album details	Peak chart positions								
Title	Album details	AUS	BEL (WA)	FRA	GER	NED	POR	SPA	SWI	UK Sales
Parcels	Released: 12 October 2018; Label: Kitsuné, Because; Formats: CD, LP, digital download, streaming	94	200	49	48	—	—	—	63	61
Day/Night	Released: 5 November 2021; Label: Because; Formats: 2×CD, 2×LP, digital download, streaming	30	43	33	19	55	30	77	31	83
Loved	Released: 12 September 2025; Label: Because Music; Formats: CD, LP, digital download, streaming	24	87	—	53	78	—	—	22	20

=== Live albums ===
List of live albums, with release date and label shown
Title	Album details	Peak chart positions		
Title	Album details	FRA	GER	POR
Live Vol. 1	Released: 30 April 2020; Label: Kitsuné, Because; Formats: 2×LP, digital download, streaming	171	95	40
Live Vol. 2	Released: 20 October 2023; Label: Kitsuné, Because; Formats: 2×LP, digital download, streaming	—	—	—

=== Extended plays ===
List of EPs, with release date and label shown
Title	EP details	Peak chart positions	
Title	EP details	FRA	POR
Clockscared	Released: 2 March 2015; Label: Parcels (independent); Formats: CD, digital download	—	—
Hideout	Released: 27 January 2017; Label: Kitsuné; Formats: CD, LP, digital download, streaming	61	—
Hideout Remixed	Released: April 2017; Label: Kitsuné; Formats: digital download, streaming	—	—
Day/Night Remixed	Released: August 2022; Label: Because Music; Formats: digital download, streaming	—	—
Leave Your Love	Released: 27 November 2024; Label: Parcels (independent); Formats: digital download, streaming	—	173

=== Charted and certified singles ===
List of charted or certified singles by Parcels
Title	Year	Peak chart positions							Certifications	Album
Title	Year	BEL (FL) (tip)	CRI Ang. Air.	CRI Ang. Stream.	FRA	MEX Ingles Airplay	NZ Hot	UK Physical	Certifications	Album
"Herefore"	2016	—	—	—	120	—	—	—		Non-album single
"Myenemy"	2016	—	—	—	173	—	—	—		Hideout
"Overnight"	2017	36	—	—	62	—	—	55	SNEP: Gold	Non-album single
"Tieduprightnow"	2018	—	—	—	—	48	—	79	ARIA: Gold; BPI: Silver; RMNZ: Platinum; SNEP: Gold	Parcels
"Lightenup"	2018	34	—	—	—	—	—	—	SNEP: Gold	Parcels
"Somethinggreater"	2021	—	—	—	—	—	—	—	SNEP: Gold	Day/Night
"Yougotmefeeling"	2025	—	15	10	—	—	—	—		Loved
"Sorry"	2025	—	—	—	—	—	30	—		Loved

== Awards and nominations ==
=== NSW Music Prize ===
The NSW Music Prize aims to "celebrate, support and incentivise" the NSW's most talented artists, with "the aim of inspiring the next generations of stars". It commenced in 2025.

Year	Nominee / work	Award	Result	Ref.
2026	Loved	NSW Music Prize	Nominated	
