= Overnight (Parcels song) =

Single by Parcels
- Released: 21 June 2017
- Length: 3:39
- Label: Kitsuné
- Songwriters: Louie Swain; Patrick Hetherington; Noah Hill; Anatole Serret; Jules Crommelin; Thomas Bangalter; Guy-Manuel de Homem-Christo
- Producer: Daft Punk

Parcels singles chronology
"Hideout" (2017)	"Overnight" (2017)	"Tieduprightnow" (2018)

Music videos
- "Overnight (Live from Hansa Studios, Berlin)" (2020) on YouTube
- "Overnight" (2025) on YouTube

"Overnight" is a song by Australian group Parcels and produced by Daft Punk. It was released in June 2017 and peaked at number 62 in France.

"Overnight" was performed on Conan in September 2017 as Parcels' U.S. television debut.

== Background and release ==
Daft Punk quietly attended a concert of Parcel's in Paris in April 2016 and met up after the show telling them "We'd like you to come to our studio and hang out".

Six months later, Parcels met Daft Punk in their L.A. studio. Parcels' said "Not once was it said 'let’s make a song together, we want to produce you'. We just came in and we all sat down and, of course, we were a little bit starstruck and nervous." Eventually demos were shared and "Overnight" being selected by Daft Punk with them reportedly saying "we can really imagine working on this one with you guys."

Parcels said working with Daft Punk's "meticulous, mysterious methods" was "challenging". The group said "Everything with those two is extremely slow, I'll tell you that much, and it's all very unclear. There was never a point where we knew what we were doing with them, even up until finishing and releasing the song. It would be months in between any sort of communication and a lot of uncertainty surrounding it all. There were times where they didn't like the song, 'it's over, we're not doing it'. Then we came back and we added something or work on it and the inspiration was back and all rolling with this inspiration, which is untouchable." Parcels said "From the start to the finish it was an equal collaboration with no pressure, only a desire to create something meaningful together."

The digital single was released in June 2017, with a vinyl released in November 2017.

== Reception ==
Cameron Cook from Pitchfork said "The track is expertly produced, every note glossed-over and crystal clear, straight off the assembly line of Daft Punk’s summertime hit factory."

Tom Breihan from Stereogum called the song "a piece of lush, meticulous disco-flavored studio-pop that's very much in the vein of Daft Punk's Random Access Memories.

Rachel Kupfer from EDM said the song "blends the unmistakable character of Daft Punk with the indie-dance personality of the five-piece Australian band. It blends funky guitar rhythms, bright chords and bouncy percussion with potent vocals and repetitive, catchy lyrics."

== Track listing ==
digital single
No.	Title	Length
1.	"Overnight"	3:39

7" single (Kitsuné Music-262)
No.	Title	Length
1.	"Overnight"	3:40
2.	"Overnight" (Live At Spotify London)	4:09

== Charts ==
Chart performance for "Overnight"
Chart (2017)	Peak position
Belgium (Ultratip Bubbling Under Wallonia)	36
France (SNEP)	62
UK Physical Singles (OCC)	55

== Certifications ==
Certifications for "Overnight"
Region	Certification	Certified units/sales
France (SNEP)	Gold	100,000^{‡}
New Zealand (RMNZ)	Gold	15,000^{‡}
^{‡} Sales+streaming figures based on certification alone.
