= Ninajirachi =

Australian music producer and DJ (born 1999)

- Wilson in 2026

Background information
- Born: Nina Jo Wilson; 10 August 1999 (age 27)
- Origin: Central Coast, New South Wales, Australia
- Genres: EDM; electro house; hyperpop
- Occupations: DJ, producer
- Years active: 2016-present
- Label: NLV Records
- Website: www.ninajirachi.com

Nina Jo Wilson (born 10 August 1999), better known by her stage name, Ninajirachi, is an Australian electronic music producer and DJ from Central Coast, New South Wales. Her stage name is a combination of her first name and the Pokémon Jirachi. Her 2025 debut album, I Love My Computer, received critical acclaim and propelled her to international recognition.

At the 2025 ARIA Music Awards, she garnered eight nominations, the most of any artist that year, and won Best Solo Artist, Breakthrough Artist, and Best Independent Release. She also won the Australian Music Prize, Breakthrough Artist of the Year for the NSW Music Prize, and Australian Album of the Year at the 2025 J Awards.

== Early life ==
Nina Jo Wilson was born on August 10, 1999 and grew up in Kincumber, New South Wales. She played clarinet in her primary school band, which she would sometimes record playing and edit it in GarageBand. Wilson grew up listening to Kylie Minogue, as her mother was a devoted fan of the artist, and listened to the radio in the car with her father. Her favorite songs as a child were "Don't Cha" recorded by the Pussycat Dolls and "4ever" by the Veronicas. She said that the "absence of stimuli" in her small town forced her to use her imagination and be creative with music.

She attended Gosford High School. While in high school, Wilson worked at Yogurtland. Wilson taught herself electronic music production as a teenager, using GarageBand and later FL Studio and Ableton. Initially, Wilson was creating music as a hobby, instead of for commercial success.

Wilson's musical inclinations were inspired variously by the EDM scene. She has stated that the first concert she ever attended was a show by American DJ Porter Robinson, with whom she later produced "WannaCry". She also credits French musician Madeon's "Pop Culture" mashup with kickstarting her interest in EDM, an experience that guided her in the writing of "iPod Touch". A year after its release, "iPod Touch" was remixed by Madeon to include some of the sounds he originally incorporated into "Pop Culture", his first remix since 2012.

== Career ==
Wilson achieved breakthrough success with her 2017 single "Pure Luck" featuring Freya Staer, which received high rotation on Triple J. Wilson was a finalist in Triple J's Unearthed High competition in both 2016 and 2017. Her third career single "Warm Fire Lightning" was released in February 2018. She signed with NLV Records and released her first single on that label, "Pathetic", in August 2018. She released her debut EP Lapland in 2019. In March 2020, Ninajirachi released "Cut the Rope", the lead single from her second EP Blumiere and first using her own vocals in the mix.

In 2021, Wilson's collaborative EP True North with Kota Banks was named the 8th best album of the year by The Atlantic. The same year, she developed the official demo project for Ableton Live 11, which was included for all users with the software's release. It provided insights into her production techniques as well as new features from Ableton, including comping, MPE, and updated audio effects. A mixtape titled Second Nature was released on 11 November 2022. In June 2023, Wilson released "Shypop" with ISOxo. Wilson's fourth EP 4x4 was released in November 2023. Ninajirachi's fifth EP, Girl EDM was released on 14 May 2024. In April 2025, 4×4 and Girl EDM were released as part of Record Store Day.

Wilson performing in January 2026

On 8 August 2025, Wilson's debut album I Love My Computer was released. The album follows a theme of Wilson's relationship with her computer and the internet. The album peaked at number 12 on the ARIA Charts, and went on to garner eight nominations at the 2025 ARIA Awards, the most of any artist that year, winning her three. According to Paul Cashmere, her single "Fuck My Computer" was the "trigger for a breakout year, pulling global ears toward her glitch-pop and IDM-leaning production," and propelling her into the role of "one of Australia's most important new electronic voices." The following year, Wilson performed at Coachella, where Porter Robinson made a surprise appearance to debut a collaboration. The collaboration, "WannaCry", was released on 29 July 2026.

== Artistry ==
Wilson cites "nature, fantasy, science fiction, ideas of occult and magic" as influences on her music.

== Personal life and views ==
Wilson expressed disdain for the use of artificial intelligence (AI) in music in October 2025, saying that "the most fun part of making music is bumbling around and making mistakes", a part of the process which she said AI takes away.

Wilson cites producer Flume as one of her heroes, and Alt-J as one of her favorite bands. She said that the latter's album An Awesome Wave was "seared into her brain" after listening it so much as a teenager.

== Discography ==
=== Studio albums ===
List of studio albums, with release date, label, release formats, selected chart positions and certifications shown
Title	Studio album details	Peak chart positions
Title	Studio album details	AUS
I Love My Computer	Released: 8 August 2025; Format: CD, LP, digital download, streaming; Label: NLV Records (NLVR0249)	12

=== Mixtapes ===
List of mixtapes, with release date, label and release formats shown
Title	Mixtape details
Second Nature	Released: 11 November 2022; Format: LP, digital download, streaming; Label: NLV (NLVR0140)

=== Extended plays ===
List of EPs, with release date, label, release formats, and album name shown
Title	EP details
Lapland	Released: 17 February 2019; Format: CD, Digital download, streaming; Label: NLV
Blumiere	Released: June 2020; Format: LP, Digital download, streaming; Label: NLV (NLVR0045)
True North (with Kota Banks)	Released: 6 November 2020; Format: Digital download, streaming; Label: Ninajirachi, Kota Banks
4x4	Released: 10 November 2023; Format: Digital download, streaming; Label: NLV (NLVR0173)
Girl EDM	Released: 14 May 2024; Format: CD, Digital download, streaming; Label: NLV (NLVR0199)

=== Compilation albums ===
List of compilation albums, with release date, label and release formats shown
Title	Compilation album details
Girl EDM (Disc 1)	Released: 6 September 2024; Format: CD, digital download, streaming; Label: NLV (NLVR0213)

=== Singles ===
List of singles, with year released, release formats, selected chart positions and certifications shown
Title	Year	Peak chart positions			Album
Title	Year	AUS	NZ Hot	US Dance/ Elec.	Album
"Pure Luck" (with Freya Staer)	2017	—	—	—	Non-album singles
"Same World" (with Yates)	2017	—	—	—	Non-album singles
"Warm Fire Lightning" (with Satellite Mode)	2018	—	—	—	Non-album singles
"Pathetic"	2018	—	—	—	Lapland
"Gardenia" (featuring Oh Boy)	2018	—	—	—	Lapland
"Human" (with Freya Staer)	2019	—	—	—	Lapland
"Water Gun"/ "Stingray" (featuring Oh Boy)	2019	—	—	—	Non-album single
"Cut the Rope"	2020	—	—	—	Blumiere
"Blumiere"	2020	—	—	—	Blumiere
"Alight"	2020	—	—	—	Blumiere
"Pomegranate" (Ninajirachi Remix)	2020	—	—	—	Non-album single
"True North" (with Kota Banks)	2020	—	—	—	True North
"Opus" (with Kota Banks)	2020	—	—	—	True North
"Holy Water" (with Kota Banks)	2020	—	—	—	True North
"Secretive!" (with Kota Banks)	2021	—	—	—	True North (Deluxe)
"Prosperity" (with Laces)	2021	—	—	—	Field Fallacy XVI
"Slytherin" (with Kota Banks)	2021	—	—	—	True North (Deluxe)
"Dracodraco" / "Stoneteller"	2021	—	—	—	Non-album single
"Pray4U" (with Lucianblomkamp)	2021	—	—	—	Where in the World Is Lucianblomkamp?
"Start Small"	2022	—	—	—	Second Nature
"Petroleum" / "Hidden Land"	2022	—	—	—	Second Nature
"X33 (Angel☆Type!)" (featuring Kenta204)	2022	—	—	—	Second Nature
"One Long Firework in the Sky" (with Montaigne)	2022	—	—	—	Second Nature
"Crush Me" (featuring Kota Banks)	2022	—	—	—	Second Nature
"1×1" (with Ravenna Golden)	2023	—	—	—	4x4
"Shypop" (with ISOxo)	2023	—	—	—	Kids Gone Mad!
"Undo U"	2023	—	—	—	4x4
"Kota On the Plane" (with Kota Banks)	2023	—	—	—	4x4
"Ninacamina" (with Izzy Camina)	2024	—	—	—	Girl EDM
"Hand On My Heart"	2024	—	—	—	Girl EDM
"Ice You Out" (with Kota Banks)	2024	—	—	—	Girl EDM
"How Could U" (with BRUX)	2024	—	—	—	Non-album single
"Angel Music" (with MGNA Crrrta)	2024	—	—	—	Girl EDM (Disc 1)
"All I Am"	2025	—	—	—	I Love My Computer
"BiBi" (with Billionhappy)	2025	—	—	—	TBA
"Fuck My Computer"	2025	—	—	—	I Love My Computer
"iPod Touch"	2025	— (Note: "iPod Touch" did not enter the ARIA Top 100 Singles Chart, but peaked at both number 15 on the ARIA Australian Artists Singles Chart and number 20 on the ARIA Dance Singles Chart on 2 February 2026.)	—	—	I Love My Computer
"Infohazard"	2025	—	—	—	I Love My Computer
"It's You" (with Daine)	2025	—	—	—	I Love My Computer
"Sisters" (with Frost Children)	2026	—	—	—	Sister (Remixed)
"WannaCry" (with Porter Robinson)	2026	— (Note: "WannaCry" did not enter the ARIA Top 100 Singles Chart, but peaked at number 8 on the ARIA Australian Artists Singles Chart.)	33	17	Non-album single
"Perfect Pinterest Garden" (Ninajirachi & Underscores Remix)	2026	—	—	—	Smile! :D plus+
"—" denotes an album that did not chart or was not released in that territory.

=== Songs Used in Media ===
Several of Wilson’s songs have been used within TV shows, video games and commercials including the following:
Year	Song	Media
2026	"Fuck My Computer"	Club Kid
2026	"Ninacamina (Bamster Remix)"	Heartbreak High Season 3 (Netflix)
2026	"All I Am"	Meta commercial featuring Kylie Jenner
2024	"Wayside"	Fortnite Radio
2023	"Hidden Land"	Special Ops: Lioness Season 1 (Paramount+)
2022	"Stingray"	Heartbreak High Season 1 (Netflix)
2017	"Pure Luck"	Dare to Live (MTV)

== Awards and nominations ==
Award	Year	Category	Work	Result	Ref.
AIR Awards	2023	Best Independent Dance or Electronica Album or EP	Second Nature	Nominated	
AIR Awards	2025	Best Independent Dance or Electronica Album or EP	Girl EDM	Nominated	
AIR Awards	2025	Independent Producer of the Year	Nina Wilson for Girl EDM	Nominated	
AIR Awards	2026	Independent Album of the Year	I Love My Computer	Won	
AIR Awards	2026	Best Independent Electronic Album or EP	I Love My Computer	Won	
AIR Awards	2026	Independent Song of the Year	"iPod Touch"	Won	
AIR Awards	2026	Best Independent Electronic Single	"iPod Touch"	Won	
AIR Awards	2026	Independent Music Video of the Year	Ball Bass John for Ninajirachi - "Fuck My Computer"	Nominated	
AIR Awards	2026	Independent Marketing Team of the Year	NLV Records, The Orchard for I Love My Computer	Won	
AIR Awards	2026	Independent Publicity Team of the Year	Twnty Three for I Love My Computer	Won	
AIR Awards	2026	Independent Producer of the Year	Nina Wilson for I Love My Computer	Won	
AIR Awards	2026	Independent Mix, Studio or Mastering Engineer of the Year	Thomas Purcell (p.k.a. Wave Racer) for I Love My Computer	Won	
APRA Awards	2026	Song of the Year	"iPod Touch"	Nominated	
APRA Awards	2026	Emerging Songwriter of the Year	—N/a	Nominated	
Australian Music Prize	2025	Australian Music Prize	I Love My Computer	Won	
ARIA Awards	2025	Album of the Year	I Love My Computer	Nominated	
ARIA Awards	2025	Best Solo Artist	—N/a	Won	
ARIA Awards	2025	Breakthrough Artist	—N/a	Won	
ARIA Awards	2025	Best Dance/Electronic Release	I Love My Computer	Nominated	
ARIA Awards	2025	Best Independent Release	I Love My Computer	Won	
ARIA Awards	2025	Best Cover Art	I Love My Computer	Nominated	
ARIA Awards	2025	Best Engineered Release	I Love My Computer	Nominated	
ARIA Awards	2025	Best Produced Release	I Love My Computer	Nominated	
ARIA Awards	2026	Best Solo Artist	—N/a	Nominated	
ARIA Awards	2026	Best Dance/Electronic Release	"WannaCry" (shared with Porter Robinson)	Won	
ARIA Awards	2026	Best Independent Release	"WannaCry" (shared with Porter Robinson)	Nominated	
ARIA Awards	2026	Best Australian Live Act	Ninajirachi for Dark Crystal V	Nominated	
ARIA Awards	2026	Best Produced Release	2Charm – Star Scum City	Nominated	
ARIA Awards	2026	Best Produced Release	"WannaCry" (shared with Porter Robinson)	Nominated	
Electronic Dance Music Awards	2026	Best New Artist	—N/a	Nominated	
Electronic Dance Music Awards	2026	Music Video of the Year	"Fuck My Computer"	Nominated	
J Awards	2025	Australian Album of the Year	I Love My Computer	Won	
J Awards	2025	Australian Video of the Year	"Fuck My Computer"	Won	
J Awards	2026	Australian Live Act of the Year	—N/a	Won	
MPEG Awards	2026	Breakthrough Producer of the Year	—N/a	Won	
Music Victoria Awards	2024	Best DJ	—N/a	Nominated	
Music Victoria Awards	2024	Best Producer	—N/a	Nominated	
Music Victoria Awards	2024	Best Electronic Work	—N/a	Nominated	
NSW Music Prize	2025	NSW Music Prize	Girl EDM	Nominated	
NSW Music Prize	2025	NSW Breakthrough Artist of the Year	—N/a	Won	
NSW Music Prize	2026	NSW Music Prize	I Love My Computer	Won	
Vanda & Young Global Songwriting Competition	2025	Vanda & Young Global Songwriting Competition	"iPod Touch"	2nd	
