= IPod Touch (song) =

"iPod Touch"

Single by Ninajirachi

from the album I Love My Computer
- Released: 20 June 2025
- Genre: EDM; hyperpop
- Length: 3:16
- Label: NLV Records
- Songwriters: Nina Wilson; Darcy Baylis
- Producers: Wilson; Baylis

Ninajirachi singles chronology
"Fuck My Computer" (2025)	"iPod Touch" (2025)	"Infohazard" (2025)

Music video
- "iPod Touch" on YouTube

"iPod Touch" is a song by the Australian electronic producer and DJ Ninajirachi and the third single from her debut studio album, I Love My Computer. Ninajirachi, whose real name is Nina Wilson, wrote and produced the song with Darcy Baylis. The song was inspired by Wilson's experience discovering a favorite song on the Internet as a child, namely, hearing Madeon's "Pop Culture" mashup in the background of a YouTube tie-dye tutorial at age 12. "iPod Touch" is an electropop track with an energetic arrangement of synthesizers, reverb effect, and pitch-warped vocals.

Nina Las Vegas' NLV Records released "iPod Touch" on 20 June 2025. An accompanying music video shot and edited by Aria Zarzycki released the same day, which depicts Wilson dancing across different locations in her hometown Kincumber.

Since release, the song received several nominations to accolades, including Song of the Year at the APRA Music Awards of 2026. At the AIR Awards of 2026, it was additionally nominated for and won Independent Song of the Year and Best Independent Electronic Single. It was voted in at number 27 on the public-facing 2025 Triple J Hottest 100 poll, and won second prize in the 2025 Vanda & Young Global Songwriting Competition, which came with a prize of A$10,000.

In August 2026, Madeon released a remix of "iPod Touch." His first official remix since 2012, Madeon included "sounds" from his early projects in DAW FL Studio to "honor the era" Wilson described in her original track.

== Critical reception ==
Phuture said "'iPod Touch' feels like a love letter to the past, wrapped in glitchy, electro-tinged goodness that pulls you straight back to the early 2010s."

Chris Salce from Acid Stag called the song "a power-packed release filled with intoxicating instrumentation and commanding drive that'll send you into next gear."

Cameron Sunkel from EDM.com said "'iPod Touch' pulses with sprightly energy as bubbling kicks and bright, bouncy synths tangle underneath pitch-warped vocals. Reverb floods the mix and washes each drop in a glowing haze, like an after-school rush of serotonin triggered by your favourite beat dropping on a pair of busted Skullcandy headphones."

== Charts ==
Chart performance for "iPod Touch"
Chart (2026)	Peak position
Australian Artist Singles (ARIA)	15
Australia Dance (ARIA)	20
