= Michael Gudinski Breakthrough Artist ARIA Award =

Annual Australian music industry award

- Country: Australia
- Presented by: Australian Recording Industry Association (ARIA)
- First award: 2010
- Currently held by: Ecca Vandal, Looking for People to Unfollow (2026)
- Website: www.ariaawards.com.au

The Michael Gudinski Breakthrough Artist ARIA Award is an award presented at the annual ARIA Music Awards, which recognises "the many achievements of Aussie artists across all music genres", since 1987. It is handed out by the Australian Recording Industry Association (ARIA), an organisation whose aim is "to advance the interests of the Australian record industry."

Breakthrough awards for Album and Single were presented from 1989 until they were merged at the 2010 awards and renamed Breakthrough Artist – Release. The award was renamed in 2021 in honour of record executive Michael Gudinski, who had died in March of that year.

== Winners and nominees ==
In the following table, the winner is highlighted in a separate colour, and in boldface; the nominees are those that are not highlighted or in boldface.

Winner marked in a separate colour

Year	Winner(s)	Album/single Title
**2010** (24th)
**2010** (24th)	**Washington**	**I Believe You Liar**
**2010** (24th)	Amy Meredith	Restless
**2010** (24th)	Cloud Control	Bliss Release
**2010** (24th)	Philadelphia Grand Jury	Hope Is for Hopers
**2010** (24th)	Tame Impala	Innerspeaker
**2011** (25th)	No award given^{[A]}	
**2012** (26th)
**2012** (26th)	**360**	**Falling & Flying**
**2012** (26th)	Alpine	A Is for Alpine
**2012** (26th)	Lanie Lane	To the Horses
**2012** (26th)	Matt Corby	Brother
**2012** (26th)	San Cisco	Awkward
**2013** (27th)
**2013** (27th)	**Flume**	**Flume**
**2013** (27th)	Big Scary	Not Art
**2013** (27th)	RÜFÜS	Atlas
**2013** (27th)	The Rubens	The Rubens
**2013** (27th)	Vance Joy	God Loves You When You're Dancing
**2014** (28th)
**2014** (28th)	**Iggy Azalea**	**The New Classic**
**2014** (28th)	5 Seconds of Summer	5 Seconds of Summer
**2014** (28th)	Andy Bull	Sea of Approval
**2014** (28th)	Chet Faker	Built on Glass
**2014** (28th)	The Kite String Tangle	Vessel EP
**2015** (29th)
**2015** (29th)	**Courtney Barnett**	**Sometimes I Sit and Think, and Sometimes I Just Sit**
**2015** (29th)	Conrad Sewell	"Start Again"
**2015** (29th)	Gang of Youths	The Positions
**2015** (29th)	Jarryd James	"Do You Remember"
**2015** (29th)	Meg Mac	"Never Be"
**2016** (30th)
**2016** (30th)	**Montaigne**	**Glorious Heights**
**2016** (30th)	DMA's	Hills End
**2016** (30th)	L D R U	"Keeping Score" (feat. Paige IV)"
**2016** (30th)	Olympia	Self Talk
**2016** (30th)	Safia	"Make Them Wheels Roll"
**2017** (31st)
**2017** (31st)	**Amy Shark**	**Night Thinker**
**2017** (31st)	A.B. Original	Reclaim Australia
**2017** (31st)	Dean Lewis	"Waves"
**2017** (31st)	Tash Sultana	Notion
**2017** (31st)	Tkay Maidza	Tkay
**2018** (32nd)
**2018** (32nd)	**Ruel**	**"Dazed & Confused"**
**2018** (32nd)	Alex Lahey	I Love You Like a Brother
**2018** (32nd)	Jack River	Sugar Mountain
**2018** (32nd)	Mojo Juju	Native Tongue
**2018** (32nd)	Odette	To a Stranger
**2019** (33rd)
**2019** (33rd)	**Tones and I**	**"Dance Monkey"**
**2019** (33rd)	G Flip	About Us
**2019** (33rd)	Stella Donnelly	Beware of the Dogs
**2019** (33rd)	The Teskey Brothers	Run Home Slow
**2019** (33rd)	Thelma Plum	Better in Blak
**2020** (34th)
**2020** (34th)	**Lime Cordiale**	**14 Steps to a Better You**
**2020** (34th)	Alex the Astronaut	The Theory of Absolutely Nothing
**2020** (34th)	Mallrat	Driving Music
**2020** (34th)	Miiesha	Nyaaringu
**2020** (34th)	The Kid Laroi	F*ck Love
**2021** (35th)
**2021** (35th)	**Budjerah**	**Budjerah (EP)**
**2021** (35th)	Gretta Ray	Begin to Look Around
**2021** (35th)	Masked Wolf	"Astronaut in the Ocean"
**2021** (35th)	May-a	Don't Kiss Ur Friends
**2021** (35th)	Ngaiire	3
**2022** (36th)
**2022** (36th)	**King Stingray**	**King Stingray**
**2022** (36th)	Beddy Rays	Beddy Rays
**2022** (36th)	Bella Taylor Smith	"Look Me in the Eyes"
**2022** (36th)	Harvey Sutherland	Boy
**2022** (36th)	Luude	"Down Under" (featuring Colin Hay)
**2023** (37th)
**2023** (37th)	**Teenage Dads**	**Midnight Driving**
**2023** (37th)	Charley	Timebombs
**2023** (37th)	grentperez	When We Were Younger
**2023** (37th)	Pacific Avenue	Flowers
**2023** (37th)	Royel Otis	Sofa Kings
**2024** (38th)
**2024** (38th)	**Teen Jesus and the Jean Teasers**	**I Love You**
**2024** (38th)	3%	Kill the Dead
**2024** (38th)	Becca Hatch	Mayday
**2024** (38th)	Kita Alexander	Young in Love
**2024** (38th)	Sycco	Zorb
**2025** (39th)
**2025** (39th)	**Ninajirachi**	**I Love My Computer**
**2025** (39th)	Folk Bitch Trio	Now Would Be a Good Time
**2025** (39th)	Gut Health	Stiletto
**2025** (39th)	Mia Wray	Hi, It's Nice to Meet Me
**2025** (39th)	Young Franco	It's Franky Baby!
**2026** (40th)
**2026** (40th)	**Ecca Vandal**	**Looking for People to Unfollow**
**2026** (40th)	Aleksiah	Good on Paper
**2026** (40th)	Rachael Fahim	Who You Are
**2026** (40th)	Way Dynamic	Massive Shoe
**2026** (40th)	Wilsn	Bloom

== Notes ==
A: In 2011, Breakthrough Artist – Release was split into its two previous categories: Breakthrough Artist – Album and Breakthrough Artist – Single.
