= ARIA Award for Producer of the Year =

Annual Australian music industry award

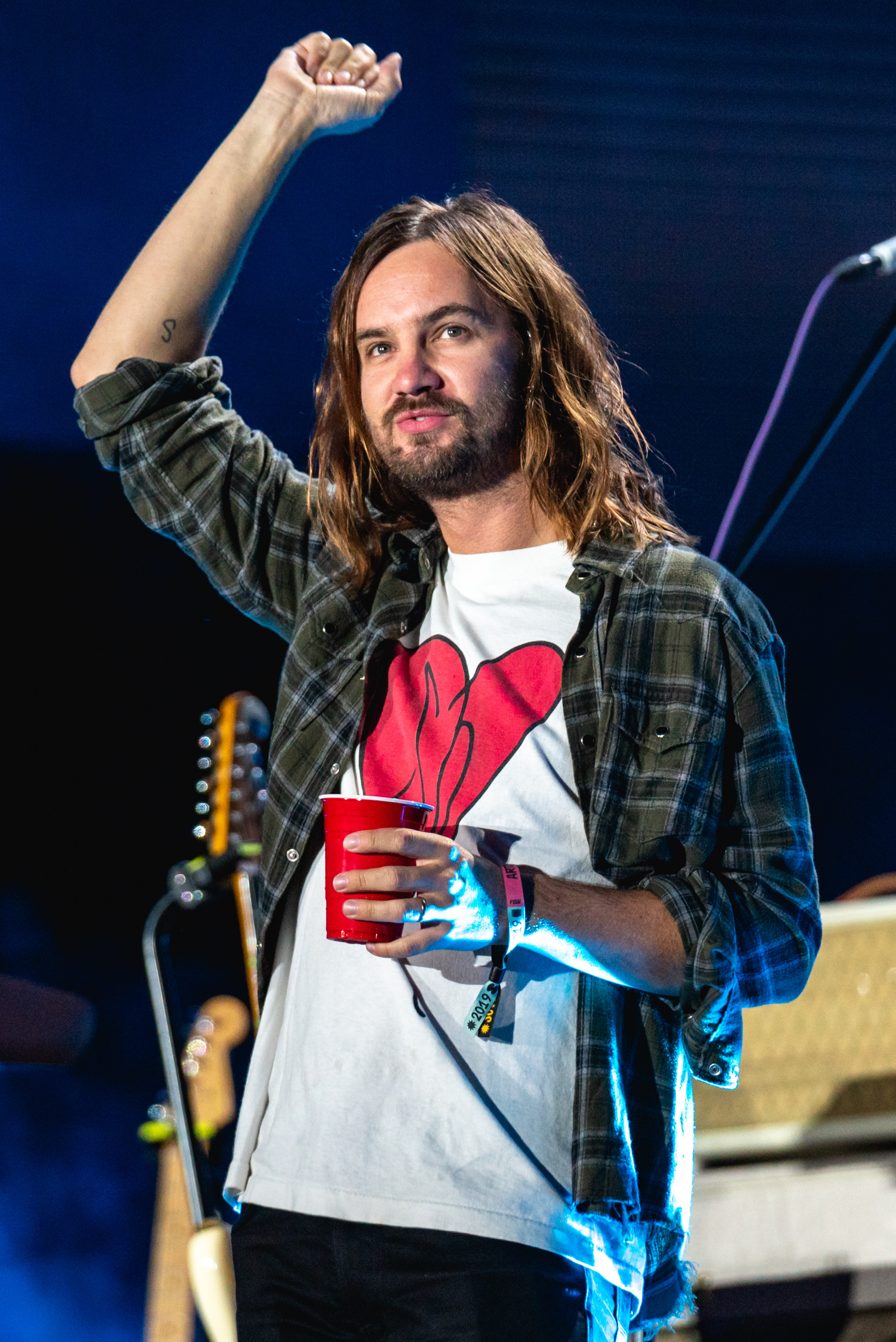
- 2026 winner Kevin Parker of Tame Impala
- Country: Australia
- Presented by: Australian Recording Industry Association (ARIA)
- First award: 1987
- Currently held by: Kevin Parker for Deadbeat by Tame Impala (2026)
- Website: ariaawards.com.au

The ARIA Music Award for Producer of the Year, is an award presented within the Artisan Awards at the annual ARIA Music Awards. The ARIA Awards recognise "the many achievements of Aussie artists across all music genres", and have been given by the Australian Recording Industry Association (ARIA) since 1987.

The award is given to the record producer(s) who is from, or resides in Australia, and has overall responsibility for the work's production. The accolade is restricted to "A single track, multiple tracks, or an entire album may be submitted for each producer. DVD releases are not eligible. Only work released during the period of eligibility will be considered. International product is eligible but entrants must accord with the general eligibility criteria for artists. In the case of a co-production, all parties must individually meet the artist eligibility criteria." Producer of the Year is voted for by a judging school, which consists of between 40 and 100 representatives experienced with that genre of music.

== Winners and nominees ==
In the following table, the winner is highlighted in a separate colour, and in boldface; the nominees are those that are not highlighted or in boldface. Nominees for some years are not available in published sources.

The years listed in the first column relate to the year and edition of the awards ceremony. The second column indicates the record producer(s) responsible for the work. The "Work title(s) and original recording artist(s)" column names the work(s) whose production has been nominated, and its original recording artist; the musician is not the nominee unless they were the producer.

=== Producer of the Year ===
Winner marked in a separate colour

Year	Producer(s)	Work title(s) and original recording artist(s)
**1987** (1st)
**1987** (1st)	**Mark Opitz**	**Models' Media** by **Models**
**1987** (1st)	**Mark Opitz**	"**Bad Moon Rising**" by **The Reels**
**1987** (1st)	**Mark Opitz**	"**Good Times**" by **INXS** and **Jimmy Barnes**
**1987** (1st)	**Mark Opitz**	"**No Lies**" by **Noiseworks**
**1987** (1st)	**Mark Opitz**	"**Sex and Fame**" by **Jump Incorporated**
**1987** (1st)	Alan Thorne	Gossip by Paul Kelly
**1987** (1st)	Brian Canham	"Funky Town" by Pseudo Echo
**1987** (1st)	Charles Fisher	"Blood Is the Colour" by Tango Bravo
**1987** (1st)	Charles Fisher	"Wait Up" by The Cockroaches
**1987** (1st)	Charles Fisher	Plaza Suite by Martin Plaza
**1987** (1st)	Ross Fraser	Whispering Jack by John Farnham
**1987** (1st)	Ross Fraser	"Flash King Cadillac" by John Justin
**1988** (2nd)	**Mark Opitz**	
**1989** (3rd)
**1989** (3rd)	**Ross Fraser**	**Age of Reason** by **John Farnham**
**1989** (3rd)	**Ross Fraser**	"**When the Word Came Down**" by **Separate Tables**
**1989** (3rd)	**Ross Fraser**	"**Real Love**" by **The State**
**1989** (3rd)	Joe Camilleri, Jeff Burstin	Hold On to Me by The Black Sorrows
**1989** (3rd)	Charles Fisher	"That's When I Think of You" by 1927
**1989** (3rd)	Charles Fisher	"Fingertips" by The Cockroaches
**1989** (3rd)	Simon Hussey	Edge by Daryl Braithwaite
**1989** (3rd)	Les Karski, Guy Gray	"Dark Age" by The Hippos
**1989** (3rd)	Les Karski, Guy Gray	"Clarity of Mind" by Spy vs Spy
**1990** (4th)	**Andrew Farriss**	
**1991** (5th)
**1991** (5th)	**Ross Fraser**	Work(s) by **John Farnham**
**1991** (5th)	**Ross Fraser**	Work(s) by **Southern Sons**
**1991** (5th)	**Ross Fraser**	Work(s) by **Girl Overboard**
**1991** (5th)	**Ross Fraser**	Work(s) by **Skyhooks**
**1992** (6th)
**1992** (6th)	**Simon Hussey**	"**On My Own**" by **Craig McLachlan**
**1992** (6th)	**Simon Hussey**	"**The Horses**", "**Higher than Hope**", "**Don't Hold Back Your Love**" by **Daryl Braithwaite**
**1992** (6th)	**Simon Hussey**	"**Slave**" by **James Reyne**
**1992** (6th)	Mark Moffatt, Gavin Campbell, Robert Goodge, Paul Main	"Treaty (Filthy Lucre Remix)" by Yothu Yindi, remixed by Filthy Lucre
**1992** (6th)	Nick Mainsbridge	"Water" by Def FX
**1992** (6th)	Nick Mainsbridge	"Blind Love Don't Go Now" by Ratcat
**1992** (6th)	Nick Mainsbridge	"Lifeboat" by Tall Tales and True
**1992** (6th)	Richard Pleasance	"Don't Cry" by Richard Pleasance
**1992** (6th)	Richard Pleasance	"It's Only the Beginning", "Release Me", "White Roses" by Deborah Conway
**1992** (6th)	Ross Fraser	"Hold Me in Your Arms" by Southern Sons
**1992** (6th)	Ross Fraser	"In Days to Come", "That's Freedom" by John Farnham
**1993** (7th)
**1993** (7th)	**Simon Hussey**	"**Nothing to Lose**" by **Daryl Braithwaite**
**1993** (7th)	**Simon Hussey**	"**Motor City (I Get Lost)**", "**Sweet Love**", "**Daddy's Gonna Make You a Star**" by **Company of Strangers**
**1993** (7th)	David Hirschfelder	"Everything's Alright" by John Farnham, Kate Ceberano, Jon Stevens
**1993** (7th)	David Hirschfelder	"I Don't Know How to Love Him" by Kate Ceberano
**1993** (7th)	Joe Camilleri	"Ain't Love the Strangest Thing", "Better Times", "Come on, Come On" by The Black Sorrows
**1993** (7th)	Joe Camilleri	"Caribbean Wind" by The Revelators
**1993** (7th)	Rockmelons	"Form one Planet", "It's not Over" by Rockmelons
**1993** (7th)	Tony Cohen	This Is Not the Way Home by The Cruel Sea
**1993** (7th)	Tony Cohen	"Get Thee to a Nunnery" by TISM
**1994** (8th)
**1994** (8th)	**Tony Cohen**	**The Honeymoon Is Over** by **The Cruel Sea**
**1994** (8th)	Angelique Cooper	"Last Train" by Christine Anu with Paul Kelly
**1994** (8th)	Angelique Cooper	"Holy Road" (Remix) by Neil Murray
**1994** (8th)	Angelique Cooper	"World Turning" (Remix) by Yothu Yindi
**1994** (8th)	James Black	"Rock this Boat", "Single Perfect Raindrop", "Heidelberg", "Barkley Street" by Things of Stone and Wood
**1994** (8th)	Joe Camilleri	"Stir It Up", "Come on, Come On" by The Black Sorrows
**1994** (8th)	Johnny Diesel	"I've Been Loving You Too Long", "Never Miss Your Water", "Masterplan" by Diesel
**1995** (9th)
**1995** (9th)	**Tony Cohen**	**Three Legged Dog** by **The Cruel Sea**
**1995** (9th)	Daniel Denholm	
**1995** (9th)	David Bridie	
**1995** (9th)	Paul McKercher	
**1995** (9th)	Phil McKellar	
**1996** (10th)
**1996** (10th)	**You Am I**	**Hourly, Daily** by **You Am I**
**1996** (10th)	David Bridie	Fool for You by Monique Brumby
**1996** (10th)	The Badloves, Doug Roberts	Holy Roadside by The Badloves
**1996** (10th)	Magoo, Regurgitator	Tu-Plang by Regurgitator
**1996** (10th)	Victor Van Vugt (Note: Australian Recording Industry Association incorrectly spells producer, Victor Van Vugt, as Victor Vaughan.)	The Soft 'N Sexy Sound by Dave Graney & the Coral Snakes
**1997** (11th)
**1997** (11th)	**Charles Fisher**	"**Down on Me**" by **Hoodoo Gurus**
**1997** (11th)	**Charles Fisher**	"**I Am Australian**" by **Judith Durham**, **Russell Hitchcock**, **Mandawuy Yunupingu**
**1997** (11th)	**Charles Fisher**	**Savage Garden** by **Savage Garden**
**1997** (11th)	**Charles Fisher**	**Far Shore** by **The Seekers**
**1997** (11th)	David Bridie	"Mary" by Monique Brumby
**1997** (11th)	Nick Launay	Freak Show by Silverchair
**1997** (11th)	Paul Begaud	Telling Everybody by Human Nature
**1997** (11th)	Tim Whitten	Furious by Fini Scad
**1997** (11th)	Tim Whitten	Double Allergic by Powderfinger
**1998** (12th)
**1998** (12th)	**Magoo**, **Regurgitator**	**Unit** by **Regurgitator**
**1998** (12th)	Paul Begaud	Whisper Your Name by Human Nature
**1998** (12th)	Daniel Denholm, Phil McKellar	"Hard Times" by The Cruel Sea
**1998** (12th)	Charles Fisher	"Universe" by Savage Garden
**1998** (12th)	Charles Fisher	The Bush Girl by The Seekers
**1998** (12th)	Rob Taylor, Tim Freedman	Eternal Nightcap by The Whitlams
**1999** (13th)
**1999** (13th)	**Bachelor Girl**	**Waiting for the Day** by **Bachelor Girl**
**1999** (13th)	Paul Begaud	"We'll Never Get Along" by Felicity
**1999** (13th)	Paul Begaud	"Now that I've Found You", "Depend on Me", "Last to Know", "Be There with You" by Human Nature
**1999** (13th)	Nick Launay	"Supposed to Be Here", "24000", "This Is the Sound", "Come to Take You Home" by Primary
**1999** (13th)	Nick Launay	Neon Ballroom by Silverchair
**1999** (13th)	Magoo	"Pump it Up" by Automatic
**1999** (13th)	Magoo	"Loverama" by Custard
**1999** (13th)	Magoo	Sand on Seven by Not from There
**1999** (13th)	Phil McKellar	Grand Slam by Spiderbait
**2000** (14th)
**2000** (14th)	**Steve James**	"**My Friend**" by **Oblivia**
**2000** (14th)	Augie March, Richard Pleasance	"Asleep in Perfection" by Augie March
**2000** (14th)	Darren Hayes, Daniel Jones	Affirmation by Savage Garden
**2000** (14th)	Rob Taylor, Tim Freedman	"You Gotta Love This City" by The Whitlams
**2000** (14th)	Andy Van, Cheyne Coates	"Don't Call Me Baby" by Madison Avenue
**2001** (15th)
**2001** (15th)	**Bobbydazzler** (a.k.a. **Darren Seltmann**, **Robbie Chater**)	**Since I Left You** by **The Avalanches**
**2001** (15th)	Augie March, Paul McKercher, Richard Pleasance	Sunset Studies by Augie March
**2001** (15th)	Kalju Tonuma	The Prize Recruit by Superheist
**2001** (15th)	The Mark of Cain	This Is This... by The Mark of Cain
**2001** (15th)	Nick Launay	Roll On by The Living End
**2001** (15th)	Paul Kosky	"Superman Supergirl" by Killing Heidi
**2002** (16th)
**2002** (16th)	**Daniel Johns**	**Diorama** by **Silverchair**
**2002** (16th)	Alex Lloyd, Magnus Fiennes	Watching Angels Mend by Alex Lloyd
**2002** (16th)	Daniel Denholm	Torch the Moon by The Whitlams
**2002** (16th)	David Nicholas, george	Polyserena by george
**2002** (16th)	Gerling, Magoo	When Young Terrorists Chase the Sun by Gerling
**2002** (16th)	Phil McKellar	New Detention by Grinspoon
**2002** (16th)	Richard Pleasance, Paul Kelly	Sensual Being by Archie Roach
**2003** (17th)
**2003** (17th)	**Chris Thompson**	**Up All Night** by **The Waifs**
**2003** (17th)	David Nicholas	Innocent Eyes by Delta Goodrem
**2003** (17th)	Jonathan Burnside	Lovers by The Sleepy Jackson
**2003** (17th)	Magoo	Bad Blood by Gerling
**2003** (17th)	Paul McKercher	Feeler by Pete Murray
**2004** (18th)
**2004** (18th)	**Paul McKercher**, **Eskimo Joe**	**A Song Is a City** by **Eskimo Joe**
**2004** (18th)	Andy Baldwin, The Cat Empire	The Cat Empire by The Cat Empire
**2004** (18th)	Daniel Johns, Paul Mac	The Dissociatives by The Dissociatives
**2004** (18th)	John Butler	Sunrise Over Sea by John Butler Trio
**2004** (18th)	Paul McKercher, Pete Murray	"So Beautiful" by Pete Murray
**2005** (19th)
**2005** (19th)	**David Nicholas**	**The Way Out** by **Drag**
**2005** (19th)	Chris Joannou, The Mess Hall	Notes from a Ceiling by The Mess Hall
**2005** (19th)	Harry Vanda, Glenn Goldsmith	"Evie Parts 1, 2 & 3" by The Wrights
**2005** (19th)	Paul McKercher	BigBigLove' by Little Birdy
**2005** (19th)	Paul McKercher, Eskimo Joe	"Older Than You" by Eskimo Joe
**2006** (20th)
**2006** (20th)	**Eskimo Joe**	**Black Fingernails, Red Wine** by **Eskimo Joe**
**2006** (20th)	Lindsay Gravina, Magic Dirt	Snow White by Magic Dirt
**2006** (20th)	Nick Launay	State of Emergency by The Living End
**2006** (20th)	Paul McKercher	Various tracks on Moo, You Bloody Choir by Augie March
**2006** (20th)	Wayne Connolly	Casino Twilight Dogs by Youth Group
**2007** (21st)
**2007** (21st)	**Wayne Connolly**, **Josh Pyke**	**Memories & Dust** by **Josh Pyke**
**2007** (21st)	Nash Chambers	Carnival by Kasey Chambers
**2007** (21st)	Magoo	Little Eve by Kate Miller-Heidke
**2007** (21st)	Angus McDonald, Peter Dolso	Sneaky Sound System by Sneaky Sound System
**2007** (21st)	Phillip McKellar	Perfect Distraction by Something with Numbers
**2008** (22nd)
**2008** (22nd)	**The Presets** (**Julian Hamilton**, **Kim Moyes**)	**Apocalypso** by **The Presets**
**2008** (22nd)	Harry Vanda, Glenn Goldsmith	Thieves by British India
**2008** (22nd)	Matt Lovell, Shihad	Beautiful Machine by Shihad
**2008** (22nd)	Michael Hohnen	Gurrumul by Geoffrey Gurrumul Yunupingu
**2008** (22nd)	Scott Horscroft	Cruel Guards by The Panics
**2009** (23rd)
**2009** (23rd)	**Empire of the Sun**, **Jonathan** "**Donnie**" **Sloan**, **Peter Mayes**	**Walking on a Dream** by **Empire of the Sun**
**2009** (23rd)	Forrester Savell	Sound Awake by Karnivool
**2009** (23rd)	Suffa	State of the Art by Hilltop Hoods
**2009** (23rd)	Tim Powles	The Peaceful Atom Is a Bomb by Regular John
**2009** (23rd)	Wayne Connolly, Paul Dempsey	Everything Is True by Paul Dempsey
**2010** (24th)
**2010** (24th)	**Angus & Julia Stone**	Various tracks on **Down the Way** by **Angus & Julia Stone** (Note: Angus and Julia Stone produced "Black Crow", "For You", "Santa Monica Dream", "Yellow Brick Road", "Walk It Off", and "Hush".)
**2010** (24th)	Charles Fisher, Hoodoo Gurus	Purity of Essence by Hoodoo Gurus
**2010** (24th)	Forrester Savel	This Is the Warning by Dead Letter Circus
**2010** (24th)	Lisa Miller, Shane O'Mara	Car Tape 2 by Lisa Miller
**2010** (24th)	Scott Horscroft, Adam Spark	Birds of Tokyo by Birds of Tokyo
**2011** (25th)
**2011** (25th)	**Wally De Backer** (aka **Gotye**)	"**Somebody That I Used to Know**" by **Gotye** featuring **Kimbra**
**2011** (25th)	Boy & Bear	Moonfire by Boy & Bear
**2011** (25th)	Daniel Denholm	Tangier by Billy Thorpe
**2011** (25th)	Eskimo Joe	Ghosts of the Past by Eskimo Joe
**2011** (25th)	Wayne Connolly, Josh Pyke	"No One Wants a Lover" by Josh Pyke
**2012** (26th)
**2012** (26th)	**Styalz Fuego**	**Falling & Flying** by **360**
**2012** (26th)	Chong Lim	Close Your Eyes by Sarah McKenzie
**2012** (26th)	Lachlan Mitchell	Prisoner by The Jezabels
**2012** (26th)	Lanie Lane	To the Horses by Lanie Lane
**2012** (26th)	Virginia Read	The Good, the Bad and the Awkward by Sally Whitwell
**2013** (27th)
**2013** (27th)	**Harley Streten** aka Flume	**Flume** by **Flume**
**2013** (27th)	Kevin Parker	Lonerism by Tame Impala
**2013** (27th)	Luke Steele, Nick Littlemore, Peter Mayes, Jonathan Sloan	Ice on the Dune by Empire of the Sun
**2013** (27th)	Virginia Read	All Imperfect Things by Sally Whitwell
**2013** (27th)	Wayne Connolly, Boy & Bear	Harlequin Dream by Boy & Bear
**2014** (28th)
**2014** (28th)	**Nicholas Murphy** aka Chet Faker	**Built on Glass** by **Chet Faker**
**2014** (28th)	Alex JL Hiew and SLUMS	TRXYE by Troye Sivan
**2014** (28th)	Nicholas Wilson, Dann Hume	Land of Pleasure by Sticky Fingers
**2014** (28th)	Stuart Stuart	Bombs Away by Sheppard
**2014** (28th)	Virginia Read	Gershwin: Take Two by Simon Tedeschi, James Morrison, Sarah McKenzie
**2015** (29th)
**2015** (29th)	**Kevin Parker**	**Currents** by **Tame Impala**
**2015** (29th)	Daniel Johns, Damn Moroda	Talk by Daniel Johns
**2015** (29th)	Garth Porter	Spirit of the Anzacs by Lee Kernaghan
**2015** (29th)	Luke Dubber, Angus Stuart	Dark Night Sweet Light by Hermitude
**2015** (29th)	Nick DiDia	Beautiful You by The Waifs
**2016** (30th)
**2016** (30th)	**Harley Streten**	**Skin** by **Flume**
**2016** (30th)	M-Phazes	"Papercuts" (featuring Vera Blue) by Illy
**2016** (30th)	Tony Buchen	Glorious Heights by Montaigne
**2016** (30th)	Robbie Chater, Tony Di Blasi	Wildflower by The Avalanches
**2016** (30th)	Alex Hope	Blue Neighbourhood by Troye Sivan
**2017** (31st)
**2017** (31st)	**Gang of Youths & Adrian Breakspear**	**Go Farther In Lightness** by **Gang of Youths**
**2017** (31st)	Daniel Rankine	Reclaim Australia by A.B. Original
**2017** (31st)	Tom Iansek	Animal by Big Scary
**2017** (31st)	Oliver Hugh Perry & Fabian Prynn	Utopia Defeated by D.D Dumbo
**2017** (31st)	Steven Schram & Paul Kelly	Life Is Fine by Paul Kelly
**2018** (32nd)
**2018** (32nd)	**Dann Hume & M-Phazes**	"**I Said Hi**" by **Amy Shark**
**2018** (32nd)	Ball Park Music	Good Mood by Ball Park Music
**2018** (32nd)	Courtney Barnett, Dan Luscombe & Burke Reid	Tell Me How You Really Feel by Courtney Barnett
**2018** (32nd)	Michael Hohnen	Djarimirri (Child of the Rainbow) by Gurrumul
**2018** (32nd)	Tash Sultana	Flow State by Tash Sultana
**2019** (33rd)
**2019** (33rd)	**Dann Hume**	**Rainbow Valley** by **Matt Corby**
**2019** (33rd)	Burke Reid	Crushing by Julia Jacklin
**2019** (33rd)	Kevin Parker	"Patience" by Tame Impala
**2019** (33rd)	Konstantin Kersting	"Dance Monkey" by Tones and I
**2019** (33rd)	Paul Kelly and Steven Schram	Nature by Paul Kelly
**2020** (34th)
**2020** (34th)	**Kevin Parker**	**The Slow Rush** by **Tame Impala**
**2020** (34th)	Kevin Shirley	Blood Moon by Cold Chisel
**2020** (34th)	M-Phazes	Free Time by Ruel
**2020** (34th)	DNA & Louis Schoorl	Hilda by Jessica Mauboy
**2020** (34th)	IAMMXO (aka Mohamed Komba)	Nyaaringu by Miiesha
**2021** (35th)
**2021** (35th)	**Konstantin Kersting**	**0202** by **The Rubens**
**2021** (35th)	**Konstantin Kersting**	**"Masterpiece"** by **The Rubens**
**2021** (35th)	Andrew Klippel, Dave Hammer	Smiling with No Teeth by Genesis Owusu
**2021** (35th)	M-Phazes	Cry Forever by Amy Shark
**2021** (35th)	M-Phazes	The Space Between by Illy
**2021** (35th)	M-Phazes	T.R.U.T.H. by Guy Sebastian
**2021** (35th)	Matt Corby	Budjerah (EP) by Budjerah
**2021** (35th)	Robert Chater	We Will Always Love You by The Avalanches

=== Producer - Best Produced Album ===
Year	Producer(s)	Work title(s) and original recording artist(s)
**2022** (36th)
**2022** (36th)	**Rüfüs Du Sol**	**Surrender by Rüfüs Du Sol**
**2022** (36th)	Amyl and the Sniffers & Dan Luscombe	Comfort to Me by Amyl and the Sniffers
**2022** (36th)	Courtney Barnett & Stella Mozgawa	Things Take Time, Take Time by Courtney Barnett
**2022** (36th)	Flume	Palaces by Flume
**2022** (36th)	Pip Norman, Rob Amoruso, Morgan Jones, Carl Dimataga, Willie Tafa & Jerome Farah	Gela by Baker Boy

=== Best Produced Release ===
Year	Producer(s)	Work title(s) and original recording artist(s)
**2023** (37th)
**2023** (37th)	**Styalz Fuego**	**"Rush" by Troye Sivan**
**2023** (37th)	Andrew Klippel and Dave Hammer	Struggler by Genesis Owusu
**2023** (37th)	Dom Dolla	"Eat Your Man" by Dom Dolla
**2023** (37th)	Matt Corby, Chris Collins, Nat Dunn, Alex Henrikssen	Everything's Fine by Matt Corby
**2023** (37th)	M-Phazes	4th Wall by Ruel
**2024** (38th)
**2024** (38th)	**Chris Collins**	**Pratts & Pain by Royel Otis**
**2024** (38th)	Crowded House & Steven Schram	Gravity Stairs by Crowded House
**2024** (38th)	Dom Dolla	"Saving Up" by Dom Dolla
**2024** (38th)	Fisher	"Atmosphere" by Fisher featuring Kita Alexander
**2024** (38th)	Luke Steele, Nick Littlemore and Peter Mayes	Ask That God by Empire of the Sun
**2025** (39th)
**2025** (39th)	**Kevin Parker**	**"End of Summer" by Tame Impala**
**2025** (39th)	Alex Burnett	I'm Sorry, Now Say It Back by Thelma Plum
**2025** (39th)	Dom Dolla	"Dreamin'" by Dom Dolla
**2025** (39th)	Nina Wilson (Ninajirachi)	I Love My Computer by Ninajirachi
**2025** (39th)	Rüfüs Du Sol	Inhale / Exhale by Rüfüs Du Sol
**2026** (40th)
**2026** (40th)	**Kevin Parker**	**Deadbeat by Tame Impala**
**2026** (40th)	Dann Hume and Andrew Klippel	Redstar Wu & the Worldwide Scourge by Genesis Owusu
**2026** (40th)	Ninajirachi	Star Scum City by 2Charm
**2026** (40th)	Ninajirachi and Porter Robinson	"WannaCry" by Ninajirachi
**2026** (40th)	Styalz Fuego	"She's the Best" by Troye Sivan
