= Can of Worms (song) =

Single by Wade Forster and Treaty Oak Revival
- Released: September 9, 2026
- Genre: Country; Texas country; rock
- Length: 4:14
- Label: TOR Records, Community Music

Wade Forster singles chronology
"Love Crimes" (2026)	"Can of Worms" (2026)

Treaty Oak Revival singles chronology
"Slim Pickins" (2026)	"Can of Worms" (2026)	"Mirror" (2026)

Music video
- "Can of Worms" on YouTube

"Can of Worms" is a song by Australian country music singer Wade Forster and American rock band Treaty Oak Revival. It was released through Treaty Oak Revival's imprint TOR Records and Australian distributor Community Music on 9 September 2026. The song marks the first studio collaboration between the two artists, and followed the release of Forster's third album The Aftermath.

"Can of Worms" debuted at number 12 on the ARIA Australian Artist Singles Chart, becoming Forster's second song (after "Anytime, Anywhere Antoinette") to appear on the chart, which appeared the same week at number 18.

== Background ==
On 8 September 2026, Forster and Treaty Oak Revival announced via a collaborative Instagram post that they were releasing "Can of Worms" the following day. Several hours later, they released a teaser of the song to social media. The song was released on 9 September 2026 at 5pm CT, alongside the music video which went live at the same time on YouTube and streaming services.

Forster and Treaty Oak Revival met while the Australian singer was supporting the band on their Australian tour in 2025, where they wrote the song between performances on Queensland's Sunshine Coast, and later recorded it at a studio in Baltimore.
