= I Love My Computer =

Studio album by Ninajirachi
- Released: 8 August 2025
- Recorded: 2023–2025
- Genres: EDM; trance; complextro
- Length: 39:49
- Label: NLV
- Producers: Nina Wilson; Darcy Baylis; Ginger Scott; Kenta204

Ninajirachi chronology
Girl EDM (Disc 1) (2024)	I Love My Computer (2025)

Singles from I Love My Computer
- 1. "All I Am" Released: 25 February 2025; 2. "Fuck My Computer" Released: 14 May 2025; 3. "iPod Touch" Released: 20 June 2025; 4. "Infohazard" Released: 17 July 2025; 5. "It's You" Released: 8 August 2025

I Love My Computer is the debut studio album by Australian electronic music producer and DJ Ninajirachi. It was released on 8 August 2025 under NLV Records. Assembled from self-written material across six years, I Love My Computer draws inspiration from electronic dance music popular on the Internet during the 2010s and traverses genres ranging from hyperpop to trance and complextro. Ninajirachi, whose real name is Nina Wilson, described the album as a tribute to her personal computer, which she calls "the greatest collaborator I'll know in this lifetime".

Ninajirachi compiled the album across two years with additional production from Darcy Baylis, Ginger Scott, and Kenta204, along some financial support from Music Australia. The album is noted for its loosely autobiographical lyricism, particularly about growing up in the early 2010s and interactions with technology and the Internet. Along its release rollout, the album also contains significant references to online and Australian culture. To promote the album, Ninajirachi embarked on an eponymous tour in 2025, and is due to follow with the I Love My Computer And It Loves Me Tour in late 2026.

Upon release, I Love My Computer garnered international attention and received critical acclaim. Critics praised the album's eclectic production and candid portrayal of online life and relationships in its writing. It won Best Independent Release at the 2025 ARIA Music Awards, along 5 other nominations. It also won the 2025 Australian Music Prize, the 2026 NSW Music Prize, and Album of the Year at the 2025 J Awards, with the music video for "Fuck My Computer" winning Music Video of the Year. At the AIR Awards of 2026, it won six awards, including Independent Album of the Year and Best Independent Electronic Album or EP. Commercially, it peaked at number 12 on the ARIA Albums Chart.

== Background ==
Ninajirachi began professionally releasing music in 2017, after being a Triple J Unearthed High finalist for both 2016 and 2017. In announcing the release of I Love My Computer, she describes the entirety of her discography as "computer music", and that she sees the computer as her instrument.

Prior to I Love My Computer, Ninajirachi created and released an extensive body of electronic music, primarily under Nina Las Vegas' independent label, NLV Records. These include Second Nature (2022), a mixtape with primarily "trap, indie, and hyperpop" influences, and Girl EDM (Disc 1) (2024), a compilation album in the hyperpop and EDM genres. Additionally, she produced the official demo project for the eleventh version of Ableton Live, the digital audio workstation she uses to produce music. When asked about why her catalog was so large before even releasing a debut album, she expressed she wanted her debut to be "really good and meaningful and have something to say, rather than just be a bunch of songs put together".

== Production ==
Ninajirachi's impetus for making a debut album came in 2023 after making "All I Am", resulting from a self-described "gut feeling that it was the time". She began creating the album with future North American shows in mind, and created music which would be conducive to the live environment. She assembled the majority of the album's tracks across the next year and settled on the album title in December 2024. During this time, Wilson released her compilation Girl EDM (Disc 1) and toured EDM festivals in the United States and Europe with support from the Music Australia Export Development Fund offered by Creative Australia.

The earliest material on I Love My Computer dates to late 2019, when Ninajirachi wrote the verses of "Delete" as "vocal gibberish over some piano chords". She later completely re-recorded the song in early 2025 after realizing that it was "thematically perfect" for the album. With frequent collaborator daine, she wrote "It's You" in late 2023. Later, in 2024, she wrote "Infohazard" alongside Darcy Baylis at daine's "writing camp", with Baylis then additionally contributing guitars in the verse of "It's You". "All I Am", the first song Ninajirachi made sonically for the album and the first single, was conceived at a jam at Ben Lee's Los Angeles house when she first toured in the United States in 2023. She later wrote that she was most proud of "Sing Good" as a track.

Sequencing the album was an important part of I Love My Computer's production to Ninajirachi, who said that it was both meant to be listened to from "front to back" similar to the sequence of a DJ set and meant to be seen as individual songs simultaneously. Alt-J's An Awesome Wave, Mk.gee's Two Star & the Dream Police, and Tame Impala's Currents were references for the album's sequencing.

== Composition ==
Vivian Medithi of The Fader described the album as a "mix of bloghouse, trance, and hardstyle" that "recombines DNA from Skrillex and Flume's big-tent EDM with the flubbery pop of PC Music and Porter Robinson." Wilson described the album's sound as "Girl EDM", which had become the title of her last EP. The name was inspired by her performance at a Los Angeles EDM festival, when she, MGNA Crrrta, Izzy Camina, and DJ Dave, all women, were the show's main headliners. Ninajirachi also called the album "Australian dance music", influenced by her experiences growing up in rural Australia and by other dance artists from the country, like Empire of the Sun and The Presets. Wilson, however, was not involved in the Australian music scene during her early life, and said she was more a part of online music communities than local ones.

Lyrically, the album centres on Wilson's childhood experiences of listening to songs on her iPod Touch, and her intimate relationship with technology and music as an adolescent and adult. Wilson also created a headcanon around technology during the album's creation, characterising cell towers as "places of worship" for computers, among other things.

=== Songs ===
"Fuck My Computer", the album's second single, was inspired by Wilson's love of making music, as well as the frustration she felt when not able to transcribe a song idea she had in her head onto her music software fast enough.

The song "CSIRAC" was written about the computer of the same name, Australia's first digital computer, which created electronic music on its own.

== Promotion ==
Ninajirachi announced the album's release on her Instagram account on 12 June 2025 while also revealing the album cover. Dedicating the album to her computer, she describes it as “the greatest collaborator I’ll know in this lifetime.” Prior to the album's release, Ninajirachi promoted it through four singles: "All I Am", "Fuck My Computer", "iPod Touch", and "Infohazard".

== Artwork and packaging ==
Wilson said that the cover artwork for I Love My Computer was inspired by "unidentifiable images", and was an attempt to fit as much of her life as possible into one image. The artwork was staged and shot in Wilson's own room, and many of the objects pictured were her own belongings or were borrowed from friends. The cover was shot by Aria Zarzycki, who made several visual tweaks to the original photo on Adobe Photoshop, such as changing the wordmark "RABID" on Wilson's sweatshirt to "ILMC", an abbreviation of the album title.

== Critical reception ==
Professional ratings
Review scores
Source	Rating
The Guardian	5/5 stars
The Line of Best Fit	9/10
The Needle Drop	8/10
Pitchfork	7.8/10
Paste	8.6/10

Jared Richards of The Guardian described the album as "an immensely fun and inventive dance album that doubles as a surprisingly touching coming-of-age story."

Alessio Anesi of EDM.com said: "The stunning album effectively crystallises the Australian artist as one of today's brightest young stars in the electronic music scene." Anesi said "[the] production lands as among the most unique in the contemporary electronic music landscape. Although Ninajirachi draws from sounds that were trending when she just was a toddler—like electroclash, YK2 [sic] trance and the complextro of Wolfgang Gartner and Zedd—this record feels modern and completely her own."

Katie Bain of Billboard described the album as "smart, stylish and ebullient, with a bit of edge and a lot of observations on living and loving in our computer world", calling it "one of the year's best dance albums".

Spencer Kornhaber of The Atlantic ranked the album as number 1 of his "10 Best Albums of 2025" list, describing the album's portrayal of the Internet as having an "aching warmth". He writes both of how "the synthetic claps and noisy basslines of [Wilson's] production evokes mega raves" and how the album "builds to a climax in which hope and fear are swept into the same rush of human experience". He also comments how the potential replicability of the album by generative AI tools highlights the importance of finding "old-fashioned meaning and transcendence".

== Track listing ==
All tracks are written and produced by Nina Wilson, except where noted.

I Love My Computer track listing
No.	Title	Writer(s)	Producer(s)	Length
1.	"London Song"			3:15
2.	"iPod Touch"	Wilson; Darcy Baylis	Wilson; Darcy Baylis	3:16
3.	"Fuck My Computer"			3:10
4.	"CSIRAC"			3:21
5.	"Delete"			3:51
6.	"ฅ^•ﻌ•^ฅ"	Wilson; Alex Greenwald; Benjamin Lee; Jenna McDougall; Marie DeVita		1:06
7.	"All I Am"	Wilson; Greenwald; Lee; McDougall; DeVita		3:02
8.	"Infohazard"	Wilson; Baylis	Wilson; Baylis	4:29
9.	"Battery Death"	Wilson; Ginger Scott	Wilson; Scott	3:18
10.	"Sing Good"			2:40
11.	"It's You" (with Daine)	Wilson; Baylis; Daine Lauren Wright		2:49
12.	"All at Once"	Wilson; Kenta Hoskin	Wilson; Kenta204	5:26
Total length:				39:49

=== Notes ===
- 'ฅ^•ﻌ•^ฅ' is listed on physical media as 'Cat Interlude'

== Personnel ==
Credits adapted from the album's liner notes and Tidal.

- Ninajirachi – production, sampler
- Wave Racer – mixing
- Wayne Sunderland – mastering
- Darcy Baylis – production on "iPod Touch" and "Infohazard"
- Ginger Scott – production on "Battery Death"
- Kenta204 – production on "All at Once"
- Aria Zarzycki – cover art, photography
- John You – art direction, graphics

== Charts ==
=== Weekly charts ===
Weekly chart performance for I Love My Computer
Chart (2025–2026)	Peak position
Australian Albums (ARIA)	12
UK Albums Sales (Official Charts)	78
UK Dance Albums (Official Charts)	5
UK Independent Albums (Official Charts)	27

=== Year-end charts ===
Year-end chart performance for I Love My Computer
Chart (2025)	Position
Australian Artist Albums (ARIA)	29
Australian Dance Albums (ARIA)	19
