= 2Charm =

Australian electronic-pop group

- Origin: Melbourne, Australia
- Genre: electronic-pop
- Years active: 2025–present
- Label: Star Scum Records
- Website: www.2charm2charm.com

2Charm are an Australian duo formed in 2025, self-described as "indie techno sleaze g00ner pop duo". They released their debut single "Boyfriend" in September 2025. Their debut album Star Scum City was released in February 2026 and was nominated for three ARIA Music Awards.

== Career ==
In September 2025, 2Charm released their debut single "Boyfriend". This was followed a month later with "Paris (To Get You Out of My Head)".

In February 2026, they released their debut album, Star Scum City, produced by Ninajirachi.

== Discography ==
=== Albums ===
List of studio albums, with selected details
Title	Album details	Peak chart positions
Title	Album details	AUS Artist
Star Scum City	Released: 27 February 2026; Format: CD, LP, cassette, digital; Label: Orch (2CHARM001V)	15

== Awards and nominations ==
=== ARIA Music Awards ===
The ARIA Music Awards is an annual awards ceremony that recognises excellence, innovation, and achievement across all genres of Australian music.

Year	Nominee / work	Award	Result	Ref.
2026	"Boyfriend"	ARIA Award for Best Independent Release	Nominated	
2026	Nina Wilson (Ninajirachi) for 2charm – Star Scum City	ARIA Award for Best Produced Release	Nominated	
2026	Thomas Purcell (Wave Racer) for 2charm – Star Scum City	ARIA Award for Best Engineered Release	Nominated	

=== The Triffid - Queensland Album of the Year ===
The Triffid - Queensland Album of the Year is an annual award that is presented to a Queensland band or musical act for the best album of the year. The winner is selected from six nominees and they the spine of their album art painted on the 'Triffid Wall'.

Year	Nominee / work	Award	Result
2026	Star Scum City	Qld Album of the Year	Nominated
