= WannaCry (song) =

2026 single by Ninajirachi and Porter Robinson

Single by Ninajirachi and Porter Robinson
- Released: 29 July 2026
- Genre: Trance; electropop
- Length: 3:39
- Label: NLV Records
- Songwriters: Ninajirachi; Porter Robinson
- Producers: Ninajirachi; Porter Robinson

Ninajirachi singles chronology
"Sisters" (2026)	"WannaCry" (2026)

Porter Robinson singles chronology
"Kill Me for Always" (2025)	"WannaCry" (2026)

Visualizer
- "WannaCry" on YouTube

"WannaCry" is a song recorded by Australian electronic music producer and DJ Ninajirachi and American electronic music producer Porter Robinson. Released on 29 July 2026, the song is titled after the 2017 WannaCry ransomware attack and is a duet between the two artists.

At the 2026 ARIA Music Awards it won Best Dance/Electronic Release and was nominated for Best Solo Artist, Best Independent Release and Best Produced Release.

== Background and composition ==
The first concert Ninajirachi ever attended was one of Porter Robinson's shows at Enmore Theatre in Sydney for the Worlds tour; this collaboration has subsequently been cited in multiple publications as something of a "full-circle moment."

While touring in the United States, Ninajirachi was in the same city as Porter Robinson for a few days, and Robinson asked her if she wanted to make music with him. Over the course of two days, the two worked on the song, starting from a lead melody Robinson had prepared previously.

In an interview with Billboard, Ninajirachi and Porter Robinson described the concept behind the song's lyrics as a personified, fictitious account of the titular WannaCry virus as it spreads, focusing on its feelings on how it has multiplied as far as it can go, and struggling with the fact that is the end of its life and purpose. Robinson stated in an interview with Wonderland Magazine that he had wanted to make a song titled "WannaCry" with Ninajirachi since he first came across her music.

== Reception ==
Stereogum described the song as a "throbbing trance track." EDM.com said (of the track): "WannaCry masterfully combines the genre-defying aspects of Ninajirachi's sound with Robinson's own odyssey into the world of hyperpop".

The song was featured on the The New York Times' list of "Songs We're Talking About" for the week of 31 July 2026. It was also The Music's "Power Pick" for the week of 3 August 2026, where writer Tyler Jenke described the single as "stellar" and "a dazzling meeting of masterful musical minds".

The song was nominated for four awards at the 2026 ARIA Music Awards, winning in the Best Dance/Electronic Release category. This made Ninajirachi the first female solo artist to win the award.

== Live performances ==
The song made its debut at Coachella 2026 on 10 April 2026. It was played many times before release by both artists, including Robinson's set at Electric Daisy Carnival 2026 and Ninajirachi's sets at Primavera Sound 2026, Dark Crystal, Project Glow and Dark Mofo 2026. The duo also played the song together during a show at Sydney's Chinese Laundry club.

== Charts ==
Chart performance for "WannaCry"
Chart (2026)	Peak position
Australian Artist (ARIA)	8
New Zealand Hot Singles (RMNZ)	33
US Hot Dance/Electronic Songs (Billboard)	17

== Awards and nominations ==
Year	Award	Category	Result	Ref.
2026	2026 ARIA Music Awards	Best Independent Release	Nominated	
2026	2026 ARIA Music Awards	Best Dance / Electronic Release	Won	
2026	2026 ARIA Music Awards	Best Produced Release	Nominated	
