= 2026 ARIA Music Awards =

40th edition of Australian music awards

- Date: 18 November 2026
- Venue: Hordern Pavilion, Sydney, New South Wales
- Hosted by: Melanie Bracewell, Tim McDonald

Highlights
- Most wins: Tame Impala (6)
- Most nominations: Genesis Owusu (8); Tame Impala (8)
- Website: ariaawards.com.au

Television/radio coverage
- Networks
- Network 10 and Paramount+

The 2026 ARIA Music Awards were the 40th annual Australian Recording Industry Association music awards ceremony (generally known as ARIA Music Awards or simply the ARIAs). The ARIA Awards ceremony was held on 18 November 2026, broadcast on Network 10 and live-streamed via YouTube and Paramount+ from Hordern Pavilion, Sydney. A stand-alone ARIA Hall of Fame event was held in June, with Gurrumul, Jenny Morris, Kate Ceberano, Spiderbait, the Living End and Vika and Linda inducted.

== ARIA Hall of Fame ==
To celebrate the 40th anniversary of the awards, ARIA hosted a stand-alone Hall of Fame event on 11 June 2026 at Carriageworks in Sydney, with six artists inducted. The event was announced in February 2026 and hosted by television personality Myf Warhurst, with a delayed broadcast on 13 June 2026 on ABC Entertains. The separate Hall of Fame event was first mentioned during a keynote address by ARIA's CEO, Annabelle Herd, in September 2024.

In May 2026, the six inductees were named:

- Gurrumul
- Jenny Morris
- Kate Ceberano
- Spiderbait
- The Living End
- Vika and Linda

== ARIA Global Impact Award ==
- Tame Impala

== Nominees and winners ==
Nominations were announced on 24 September 2026 via ARIA's YouTube channel, hosted by Georgie Tunny.

=== ARIA Awards ===
Full list of nominees
| Album of the Year | Best Solo Artist |
|---|---|
| Tame Impala – Deadbeat; Boy Soda – Soulstar; DMA's – DMA's; Ecca Vandal – Looking for People to Unfollow; Genesis Owusu – Redstar Wu & the Worldwide Scourge | Tame Impala – Deadbeat; Baker Boy – Djandjay; Boy Soda – Soulstar; Ecca Vandal – Looking for People to Unfollow; G Flip – Dream Ride; Genesis Owusu – Redstar Wu & the Worldwide Scourge; Matt Corby – Tragic Magic; Miss Kaninna – Blackprint; Ninajirachi – "WannaCry"; Troye Sivan – "She's the Best" |
| Best Group | Best Adult Contemporary Album |
| DMA's – DMA's; 5 Seconds of Summer – Everyone's a Star!; Gang of Youths – "Things Take Time"; Teen Jesus and the Jean Teasers – Glory; Vika and Linda – Where Do You Come From? | Matt Corby – Tragic Magic; Paul Kelly – Seventy; The Paper Kites – If You Go There, I Hope You Find It; Vika & Linda – Where Do You Come From?; Way Dynamic – Massive Shoe |
| Best Alternative Release | Best Blues & Roots Album |
| Ecca Vandal – Looking for People to Unfollow; Gang of Youths – "Things Take Time"; Genesis Owusu – Redstar Wu & the Worldwide Scourge; Meg Mac – It's My Party; Tame Impala – Deadbeat | Emma Donovan – Take Me to the River; Any Young Mechanic – The Modern Shoe Is Ruining the Foot; John Butler – Prism; William Crighton – Colonial Drift; Xavier Rudd – Freedom Sessions / Where to Now |
| Best Children's Album | Best Country Album |
| Bluey – Up Here (The Orchestral Album); Don Spencer – Feathers, Fur or Fins 40th Anniversary (Don Spencer and Friends); Emma Memma – Jungle Picnic; Play School – Dance It Out; The Wiggles – Sparkle!: A Circus of Lights | Rachael Fahim – Who You Are; Keith Urban – Flow State; Max Jackson – Dangerous in Denim; Morgan Evans – Steel Town; Wade Forster – Gooseneck Party |
| Best Dance/Electronic Release | Best Hard Rock/Heavy Metal Album |
| Ninajirachi and Porter Robinson – "WannaCry"; Dean Turnley – "Actin' Tough"; Dom Dolla and Puretone – "Addicted to Bass"; Tame Impala – "Afterthought"; Yes Boone – "All I Really Want" | Karnivool – In Verses; Cosmic Psychos – I Really Like Beer; DZ Deathrays – Easing Out of Control; These New South Whales – Godspeed; Waax – Angel's Mess |
| Best Hip Hop/Rap Release | Best Independent Release |
| Miss Kaninna – Blackprint; Baker Boy – Djandjay; Devaura – Vol. 2 If You Don't Laugh, You'll Cry; Hilltop Hoods – "Never Coming Home"; Nerve – Growing Pains | Ecca Vandal – Looking for People to Unfollow; 2Charm – "Boyfriend"; Genesis Owusu – Redstar Wu & the Worldwide Scourge; Miss Kaninna – Blackprint; Ninajirachi and Porter Robinson – "WannaCry" |
| Best Pop Release | Best Rock Album |
| Tame Impala – "Dracula"; Blusher – "Rager"; G Flip – Dream Ride; Kylie Minogue – Tension Tour//Live 2025; Troye Sivan – "She's the Best" | DMA's – DMA's; Courtney Barnett – Creature of Habit; Teen Jesus and the Jean Teasers – Glory; The Belair Lip Bombs – Again; The Temper Trap – Sungazer |
| Best Soul/R&B Release | Michael Gudinski Breakthrough Artist |
| Boy Soda – Soulstar; Becca Hatch – "Garden (Bang Goes the Drum)"; Larissa Lambert – "I Love You Out Loud"; Miss Kaninna – "Backstreets"; Tkay Maidza – "Romanticize" | Ecca Vandal – Looking for People to Unfollow; Aleksiah – Good on Paper; Rachael Fahim – Who You Are; Way Dynamic – Massive Shoe; Wilsn – Bloom |
| Best Music Festival | Best Use of an Australian Recording in an Advertisement |
| Laneway Festival (St Jerome's Laneway); Beyond the Valley (Untitled Group); CMC Rocks (CMC Rocks); Groovin' the Moo Lismore (Fuzzy Operations); Spilt Milk (Kicks Entertainment) | Amyl and the Sniffers – Toyota: Nice to Know It Could (The Hero Corporation); 3%, Fred Leone and Scribe – Fox Sports Australia: Finals Footy (Fox Sports Australia); Empire of the Sun, West Australian Symphony Orchestra and Billy-Jo Shoveller – Tourism WA: "Walking on a Dream" (The Brand Agency); G Flip – Paramount+: "All Fired Up" – AFC Women's Asian Cup (Hello/Paramount+); The Kid Laroi – Uber Eats: The Man Laroi (Special) |

=== Public voted ===
| Best Video | Song of the Year |
|---|---|
| Tas Wilson for G Flip – "Bed on Fire"; Kyle Caulfield and Charles Buxton-Leslie for Dom Dolla and Puretone – "Addicted to Bass"; Claudia Sangiorgi Dalimore for Miss Kaninna – "Backstreets"; Richie Buxton for Ecca Vandal – "Cruising to Self Soothe"; Jonathan Zawada for The Avalanches – "Every Single Weekend"; Cole Surrey for DMA's – "My Baby's Place"; Adam Saunders for Boy Soda – "Never the Same"; Jared Hinz for James Johnston – "One More"; Aurie Indianna and Jordan Ruyi Blanch for Baker Boy – "Running Low" (featuring Pardyalone); Isaac Brown for Genesis Owusu – "Stampede" | Tame Impala – "Dracula"; Fisher – "Blackberries"; G Flip – "Bed on Fire"; Keli Holiday – "Dancing2"; Lithe – "Cannonball"; Ocean Alley – "Love Balloon"; Royel Otis – "Car"; Sonny Fodera – "Think About Us"; The Kid Laroi – "A Cold Play"; Vance Joy – "Divine Feelings" |
| Best Australian Live Act | Best International Artist |
| G Flip – Dream Ride Tour Australia 2025; Baker Boy – Djandjay Tour; Boy Soda – Lil Obsession Tour; Dom Dolla – Australian Tour 2025; Gang of Youths – Various; Genesis Owusu – Redstar Wu's Pirate Radio Tour; Hilltop Hoods – Never Coming Home Tour; King Gizzard & the Lizard Wizard – Phantom Island Australia Tour; Ninajirachi – Dark Crystal V; Paul Kelly – Australian Tour 2025 | BTS – Arirang; Ed Sheeran – Play; Harry Styles – Kiss All the Time. Disco, Occasionally; Morgan Wallen – I'm the Problem; Noah Kahan – The Great Divide; Olivia Dean – The Art of Loving; Olivia Rodrigo – You Seem Pretty Sad for a Girl So in Love; Sabrina Carpenter - Man's Best Friend; Sombr – I Barely Know Her; Taylor Swift – The Life of a Showgirl |

=== Fine Arts Awards ===
Best Classical Album
- William Barton and Omega Ensemble – Gift – Our Breath of Life
  - Jayson Gillham – Chopin Etudes
  - Richard Tognetti and Australian Chamber Orchestra – Beethoven & Brahms Concertos for Violin and Orchestra
  - Simone Young and Sydney Symphony Orchestra – Mahler: Symphony No. 3
  - Tamara-Anna Cislowska, Tasmanian Symphony Orchestra & Johannes Fritzsch – Elena Kats-Chernin: Ancient Letters
Best Jazz Album
- Donny Benét – Il Basso
  - Hilary Geddes – Redleaf
  - Lauren Tsamouras and Tom Avegenicos – For Judy
  - Ten Part Invention – Time is Moved
  - The Vampires – Skydancer
Best World Music Album
- Not Drowning, Waving – Malira
  - Melbourne Ska Orchestra – Monte Loco Rides Again
  - Mo'Ju, Nicholas Buc and Melbourne Symphony Orchestra – Double J Live at the Wireless – Hammer Hall, Melbourne 2023
  - Tenzin Choegyal and Philip Glass – Be the Sky
  - The Cat Empire – Live at Sydney Opera House
Best Original Soundtrack or Musical Theatre Cast Album
- Francois Tetaz – My Brilliant Career
  - Ack Kinmonth – The Pout-Pout Fish (Original Motion Picture Soundtrack)
  - Amanda Brown – Deadloch Season 1
  - Brian Cachia – Beast (Original Motion Picture Score)
  - Caitlin Yeo – Every Little Thing (Official Motion Picture Soundtrack)

=== Artisan Awards ===
Best Produced Release
- Kevin Parker for Tame Impala – Deadbeat
  - Dann Hume and Andrew Klippel for Genesis Owusu – Redstar Wu & the Worldwide Scourge
  - Ninajirachi for 2charm – Star Scum City
  - Ninajirachi and Porter Robinson for Ninajirachi – "WannaCry"
  - Styalz Fuego for Troye Sivan – "She's the Best"
Best Engineered Release
- Kevin Parker for Tame Impala – Deadbeat
  - Dom Dolla for Dom Dolla – "Don't Worry Baby"
  - Wave Racer for 2charm – "Star Scum City"
  - Styalz Fuego for Troye Sivan – "She's the Best"
  - Tony Buchen for Dobby – Marshmellow
Best Cover Art
- Ecca Vandal, Kathryn Vinella and Sean McDonald for Ecca Vandal – Looking for People to Unfollow
  - Aurie Indianna and Sulaiman Enayatzada for Baker Boy – Djandjay
  - Connor Dewhurst for Amy Shark – Soft Pop
  - Kofi Owusu-Ansah, Isaac Brown, Gina Wagstaffe for Genesis Owusu – Redstar Wu & the Worldwide Scourge
  - Miriam David and Pat Fox for Matt Corby – Tragic Magic
