= Wilsn =

Australian pop singer

- Born: Shannon Busch; Australia
- Origin: Geelong, Australia
- Genre: soul music
- Occupations: Singer; songwriter
- Instrument: Vocals
- Years active: 2019–present
- Labels: Ivy League Records; Mushroom Records
- Website: www.wilsnmusic.com

Shannon Busch, known professionally as WILSN, is an Australian singer, songwriter.

Their second album Bloom was released in October 2025 and debuted at number 31 on the ARIA Charts.

== Early life ==
Busch originates from Geelong, Australia before moving to Melbourne to study jazz at the Victorian College of the Arts.

In 2023, Busch told The Music "My mum likes soul music; my dad likes old music. I got brought up on a lot of jazz as well. My dad's a big jazz fan. My mum's semi-musical. My dad's not really musical, but they just love the music."

Busch said she discovered and "fell in love" with Aretha Franklin's music at age 13 or 14.

== Career ==
In early 2020, WILSN toured with The Teskey Brothers in the UK and Europe.

In February 2023, WILSN released the debut album, Those Days Are Over. At the AIR Awards of 2024, it won Best Independent Soul/R&B Album or EP.

In June 2023, a cover of Crowded House's "Better Be Home Soon" with Budjerah was released for Mushroom: Fifty Years of Making Noise.

In October 2025, WILSN released Bloom.

== Discography ==
=== Albums ===
List of albums, with selected chart positions
Title	Album details	Peak chart positions
Title	Album details	AUS
Those Days Are Over	Released: 3 February 2023; Label: Ivy League Records; Format: LP, digital	
Bloom	Released: 17 October 2025; Label: Mushroom Records; Format: LP, CD, digital	31

== Awards and nominations ==
=== AIR Awards ===
The Australian Independent Record Awards (commonly known informally as AIR Awards) is an annual awards night to recognise, promote and celebrate the success of Australia's Independent Music sector.

Year	Nominee / work	Award	Result	Ref.
2024	Those Days Are Over	Best Independent Soul/R&B Album or EP	Won	
2026	Bloom	Best Independent Soul/R&B Album or EP	Won	

=== APRA Music Awards ===
The APRA Music Awards are held in Australia and New Zealand by the Australasian Performing Right Association to recognise songwriting skills, sales and airplay performance by its members annually. The Australian ceremonies began in 1982.

Year	Nominee / work	Award	Result	Ref.
2025	"Give You Love" (Shannon Busch, Stephen Mowat, Blessing Offor, Styalz Fuego, Rudy Sandapa)	Most Performed Australian Work	Nominated	
2025	"Give You Love" (Shannon Busch, Stephen Mowat, Blessing Offor, Styalz Fuego, Rudy Sandapa)	Most Performed Pop Work	Nominated	

=== ARIA Music Awards ===
The ARIA Music Awards is an annual awards ceremony that recognises excellence, innovation, and achievement across all genres of Australian music.

Year	Nominee / work	Award	Result	Ref.
2026	Bloom	Michael Gudinski Breakthrough Artist	Nominated	

=== Australian Women in Music Awards ===
The Australian Women in Music Awards is an annual event that celebrates outstanding women in the Australian Music Industry who have made significant and lasting contributions in their chosen field. They commenced in 2018.

Year	Nominee / work	Award	Result	Ref.
2024	WILSN	Songwriter Award	Nominated	

=== Vanda & Young Global Songwriting Competition ===
The Vanda & Young Global Songwriting Competition is an annual competition that "acknowledges great songwriting whilst supporting and raising money for Nordoff-Robbins" and is coordinated by Albert Music and APRA AMCOS. It commenced in 2009.

Year	Nominee / work	Award	Result	Ref.
2024	"Give You Love" (performed by Jessica Mauboy and Jason Derulo)	Vanda & Young Global Songwriting Competition	1st	
