= Way Dynamic =

Australian musical project

- Origin: Melbourne, Victoria, Australia
- Genres: Indie folk; folk-pop; art rock
- Years active: 2018–present
- Labels: Spoilsport; Earth Libraries; Jagjaguwar

Way Dynamic is the solo musical project of Australian musician and songwriter Dylan Young. Based in Melbourne, the project has released the studio albums So Familiar (2022), Duck (2024), and Massive Shoe (2025). In 2026, Young signed with Jagjaguwar for the international release of Massive Shoe and announced his first North American tour.

== Career ==
Young began releasing music as Way Dynamic in the late 2010s. In addition to his solo work, he has performed with several Melbourne-based groups, including Cool Sounds, Good Morning, Snowy Band, and Kankawa Nagarra.

Way Dynamic released the debut album So Familiar in 2022. Reviewing the album, AllMusic noted its layered arrangements and melodic songwriting.

The second album, Duck, followed in 2024.

In 2025, Way Dynamic released the third studio album, Massive Shoe. The album received coverage from publications including New Commute, Melt FM, and Still Listening Magazine.

In May 2026, Way Dynamic was included in Rolling Stone AU/NZ's annual Future of Music list, which highlighted emerging Australian and New Zealand artists.

Later that month, Jagjaguwar announced the international release of Massive Shoe and a North American tour by Way Dynamic.

== Discography ==
=== Studio albums ===
List of studio albums, with selected details
| Title | Details | Peak chart positions |
| Title | Details | AUS |
|---|---|---|
| So Familiar | Released: October 2022; Label: Spunk Records | — |
| Duck | Released: June 2024; Label: Spoilsport | — |
| Massive Shoe | Released: August 2025; Label: Spoilsport | 97 |

== Awards and nominations ==
=== ARIA Music Awards ===
The ARIA Music Awards is an annual awards ceremony that recognises excellence, innovation, and achievement across all genres of Australian music.

| Year | Nominee / work | Award | Result | Ref. |
|---|---|---|---|---|
| 2026 | Massive Shoe | Best Adult Contemporary Album | Nominated | |
| 2026 | Massive Shoe | Michael Gudinski Breakthrough Artist | Nominated | |
