= These New South Whales =

Australian punk rock band

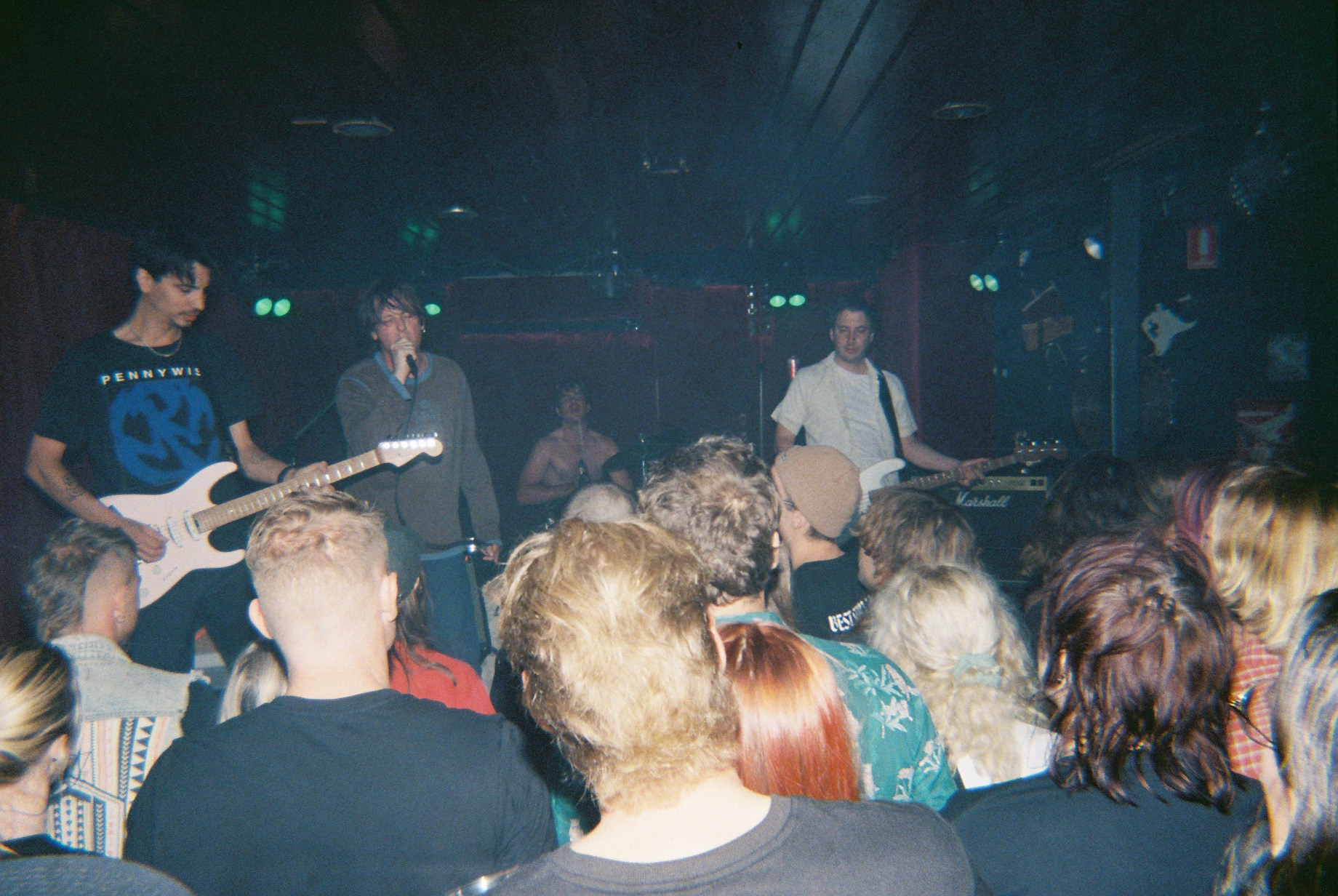
- These New South Whales performing at the Indian Ocean Hotel in Perth, Western Australia on the TNSW tour, March 2023.

Background information
- Also known as: TNSW
- Origin: Formed in Sydney, Australia; Currently based in Melbourne, Australia
- Genres: Punk, Post Punk, Alternative Rock, Art Punk, Hardcore Punk, New Wave
- Years active: 2011–present
- Labels: These New South Whales, ADA, Damaged
- Members: Jamie Timony; Todd Andrews; Will Shepherd; Frank Sweet
- Past members: Luke O'Loughlin
- Website: www.thesenewsouthwhales.com

These New South Whales are an Australian punk rock band. They formed in Sydney, Australia in 2011. Since 2019, the band has been based in Melbourne, Australia.

They have released four studio albums, one EP, and 22 music videos.

The band starred in two seasons of the comedy mockumentary series These New South Whales. The series features heightened alter ego versions of the real life band members. Comedy Central released season one in 2015, and season two in 2019. The series was co-written by guitarist Todd Andrews, lead vocalist Jamie Timony, his brother Ben Timony. The Timony brothers co-directed the series.

These New South Whales produced and starred in four episodes of TNSW Tonight, a satirical, absurdist talk show, presented in a similar style to The Eric Andre Show. They created and starred in four episodes which were made available on their youtube channel from October to November 2020. The show featured guests Daniel Johns of Silverchair, actress Phoebe Tonkin, and comedian Aaron Chen.

In 2020, Timony and Andrews began the What A Great Punk Podcast. They released 500 episodes before ending "season one" of the podcast in December 2025, effectively putting the podcast on "indefinite hiatus." Because of their multi-disciplinary output, What A Great Punk featured a range of guests, from musicians (Roger O'Donnell of The Cure, Amy Taylor of Amyl and the Sniffers, Cameron Winter of Geese, Tom Coll of Fontaines D.C), to comedians (Dave Brown, Jenna Owen, Aaron Gocs, Issy Beech, Froomes), to actors (Rhys Mitchell, Frank Sweet). Several live shows of the podcast were included as part of the Melbourne International Comedy Festival in 2022. The season one finale culminated in three live shows in Brisbane, Sydney, and Melbourne respectively.

They have also appeared at the music festivals The Great Escape, Laneway, Dark Mofo, and Party in the Paddock.

Their third studio album TNSW debuted at number 9 on the ARIA Album chart, and number 4 on the Australian Vinyl Chart in November 2022. In November 2025, they released their fourth studio album Godspeed which debuted at number 23 on the ARIA Charts.

They are known for their multi-disciplinary work, eclectic musical style, politically and socially focused lyrics, and bold aesthetics.

== Career ==
=== 2011-2015: Early years ===
These New South Whales formed in 2011 in Sydney.

The group garnered an initial following in the Sydney punk scene for their satirical punk style, energetic stage shows, and recognisable aesthetics (the band performed shirtless with gaffer tape covering their nipples for the first 7 or so years of the band's existence).

The band was formed as an antidote to the more "serious" bands the members were playing in at the time - Andrews and O'Loughlin with I Know Leopard, and Timony with his solo project Mossy. The freedom of this new project allowed them to write absurd, comedic songs, many of which featuring irreverent political and social commentary.

These New South Whales released their debut EP Fetal Instincts on January 8, 2015 on Bandcamp and digital platforms. The band operated with a DIY ethos, making their own music videos for the songs Kookaburra Laughs like the Kookaburra Love, Hey Pig, Take The Stab, Adam, and Mumma's Tit.

=== 2016-2018: You Work for Us ===
In late 2016, the band released Meat Hook, the first single from their upcoming debut album. They played headline shows across the east coast of Australia to promote the single.

In 2017, the group released their debut album You Work for Us, and embarked on their first full Australian headline tour to support it. In 2018, they supported DZ Deathrays on their Bloody Lovely tour across Australia, Europe, and the UK.

The band made music videos for the songs Space in Hell, and Cholesterol Heart. nYou Work for Us was produced by Dean Tuza, and mastered by Mikey Young.

Damaged Records re-issued the album in 2023 on vinyl to celebrate the album's 5th anniversary.

=== 2019-2020: I Just Do What God Tells Me to Do ===
In July 2019, they released "Nerve to Reverse", the first single taken from their next album. The single came with a music video, followed by another single and music video "In the Light of Day" in September 2019. Both music videos received airplay on Australian music video program Rage.

These were the first releases to feature new drummer Frank Sweet. Founding drummer Luke O'Loughlin left the band to focus on his other band I Know Leopard.

Their second album I Just Do What God Tells Me to Do, produced by Jonathan Boulet, was released in November 2019 on vinyl and digital platforms. The album integrating more abrasive sounds, synthesisers and drum machines than before. Lyrically, the themes are more serious, featuring less of the satirical, self deprecating humour of their earlier work. Timony's lyrics feature more introspection, and with veil of humour removed, he was able to be more vulnerable. The social, religious and political commentary is still present, but also presented in a less jovial manner than before. There are less "joke songs" on this album, as if they didn't want to be seen as a "joke band" anymore. This stylistic shift coincided with the band abandoning their iconic shirtless "nipple tape" stage attire around this time.

To support the album, they headlined a tour across Australia and the UK, featuring a performance at The Great Escape Festival in Brighton, England. They played at the Party in the Paddock Festival in Tasmania in February 2020.

In September 2020, the group released the non-album single "Broken System", followed by "Remote Control" and "Film the Cops". All three of these non-album singles were produced by Dean Tuza, who the band had previously worked with on their debut album.

=== 2022-2023: TNSW ===
In the lead up to their third album, These New South Whales released three singles and music videos, "Bending at the Knee, Rotten Sun"' and "Under the Pressure". Their third album TNSW was released in November 2022 via Damaged Records. It debuted at number 9 on the ARIA Album Chart.

The band appeared on Triple J's Like a Version segment, performing a cover of Chumbawumba's "Tubthumping" (with special guests Aaron Gocs, Hatchie and Shane Parsons of DZ Deathrays), as well as their own song "Changes". TNSW was nominated for the Best Hard Rock/Heavy Metal Album at the 2023 ARIA Music Awards.

=== 2025-present: Godspeed ===
These New South Whales released six singles throughout 2025 in anticipation of their fourth studio album. Godspeed was released in November 2025 and debuted at number 23 on the ARIA Charts. The album incorporatedpower pop, dream pop, new wave and alternative rock influences more than ever before, while still being underpinned by the band's punk and post-punk roots.

They embarked on a headline tour of Australia from February to May 2026.

== TV Series ==
In November 2015, Comedy Central released season one of their eponymously titled mockumentary series.

The series earned a cult following online, and was renewed for a second season released in 2019.

Special guest cameos include Jimmy Barnes, Daniel Johns, Roger O'Donnell, Linda Marigliano, Kirin J Callinan, Mathew Waters, and Dune Rats among others.

The series tells the story of a fictionalised version of the band These New South Whales, with the characters serving as alter egos of the real life members. It serves as a satire of unsuccessful bands who take themselves too seriously and let their egos get the better of them.

It is a comedy mockumentary shot in a similar style to Spinal Tap, Flight of the Conchords, Summer Heights High, and The Office.

=== TNSW Tonight! ===
These New South Whales produced and starred in four episodes of TNSW TONIGHT, a satirical, absurdist talk show, presented in a similar style to The Eric Andre Show.

They created and starred in four episodes which were made available on their youtube channel from October to November 2020. The show featured guests Daniel Johns of Silverchair, actress Phoebe Tonkin, and comedian Aaron Chen.

=== What a Great Punk ===
In 2020, Timony and Andrews began the What a Great Punk Podcast. They released 500 episodes before ending "season one" of the podcast in December 2025, effectively putting the podcast on "indefinite hiatus."

Because of their multi-disciplinary output, What A Great Punk featured a range of guests, from musicians (Roger O'Donnell of The Cure, Amy Taylor of Amyl and the Sniffers, Cameron Winter of Geese, Tom Coll of Fontaines D.C), to comedians (Dave Brown, Jenna Owen, Aaron Gocs, Issy Beech, Froomes), to actors (Rhys Mitchell, Frank Sweet).

It has been self described as a "pod about nothing", with no particular goal or overarching theme to the entire series of the podcast, resulting in a series of free form conversations with the guests and hosts. Some episodes are conducted more as interviews with the guests, and some serve as "deep dives" into the production of their albums and TV shows.

Several live shows of the podcast were included as part of the Melbourne International Comedy Festival in 2022. The season one finale culminated in three live shows in Brisbane, Sydney, and Melbourne respectively.

== Band members ==
- Jamie Timony - 2011–present (vocals)
- Todd Andrews - 2011–present (guitar)
- Will Shepherd - 2011–present (bass)
- Frank Sweet - 2019–present (drums)

== Past members ==
- Luke O'Loughlin - 2011-2018 (drums)

== Discography ==
=== Studio albums ===
List of studio albums, with selected details and peak chart positions
Title	Details	Peak chart positions
Title	Details	AUS
You Work for Us	Released: August 2017; Format: LP, digital download; Label: TNSW, ADA (TNSW01)	-
I Just Do What God Tells Me to Do	Released: 8 November 2018; Format: LP, digital download; Label: TNSW, ADA (TNSW02)	-
TNSW	Released: 18 November 2022; Format: CS, LP, digital download; Label: Damaged Records (DRC-007)	9
Godspeed	Released: 28 November 2025; Format: LP, digital download; Label: TNSW, ADA (TNSW05)	23

=== Extended plays ===
List of EPs, with selected details and peak chart positions
Title	Details
Fetal Instincts	Released: January 2015; Format: digital; Label: TNSW

== Awards and nominations ==
=== AIR Awards ===
The Australian Independent Record Awards (commonly known informally as AIR Awards) is an annual awards night to recognise, promote and celebrate the success of Australia's Independent Music sector.

Year	Nominee / work	Award	Result	Ref.
2023	TNSW	Best Independent Punk Album or EP	Nominated	
2026	Godspeed	Best Independent Punk Album or EP	Won	

=== ARIA Music Awards ===
The ARIA Music Awards are a set of annual ceremonies presented by Australian Recording Industry Association (ARIA), which recognise excellence, innovation, and achievement across all genres of the music of Australia. They commenced in 1987.

Year	Nominee / work	Award	Result	Ref.
2023	TNSW	Best Hard Rock/Heavy Metal Album	Nominated	
2026	Godspeed	Best Hard Rock/Heavy Metal Album	Nominated	
