= Aleksiah =

Australian pop singer

- Born: Alexia Damokas; Adelaide, Australia
- Genres: Pop; pop-rock
- Occupations: Musician; singer-songwriter
- Instrument: Vocals
- Years active: 2022-present
- Label: Chugg Music
- Website: www.aleksiah.com

Aleksiah (born Alexia Damokas) is an Australian singer-songwriter from Adelaide, Australia. She has released three extended plays and has won eight South Australian Music Awards.

== Career ==
Aleksiah released her debut single "Fern" in 2022.

In 2023, Aleksiah signed with Chugg Music. In 2023, she was the 6th most played artist on Triple J Unearthed.

In May 2024, Aleksiah released her debut extended play, Who Are You When You're Not Performing?. At the 2024 South Australian Music Awards, Aleksiah won four awards, with the artist saying ""This is the first time I have ever won anything and it is extremely exciting to be recognised alongside so many incredible South Australian artists that I hold in extremely high regard."

In 2025, Aleksiah supported Beth McCarthy on their European tour before releasing her second EP, Cry About It in July 2025. The EP featured the three singles "Batsh*t", "Clothes Off" and "The Hit".

At the 2025 South Australian Music Awards again won four awards.

Aleksiah released her third EP Good on Paper on 7 May 2026, featuring the singles "Punch Drunk Love", "Faker" and "Bullsh*t, Baby".

== Discography ==
=== Extended plays ===
List of EPs, with selected details
Title	Details	Peak chart positions
Title	Details	AUS
Who Are You When You're Not Performing?	Released: May 2024; Format: CD, LP, digital; Label: Chugg Music (CHG037)	—
Cry About It	Released: 11 July 2025; Format: CD, LP, digital; Label: Chugg Music (CHG040)	—
Good on Paper	Released: 7 May 2026; Format: CD, LP, digital; Label: Chugg Music (CHG043)	7

== Awards and nominations ==
=== ARIA Music Awards ===
The ARIA Music Awards is an annual awards ceremony that recognises excellence, innovation, and achievement across all genres of Australian music.

Year	Nominee / work	Award	Result	Ref.
2026	Good on Paper	Michael Gudinski Breakthrough Artist	Nominated	

=== South Australian Music Awards ===
The South Australian Music Awards are annual awards that exist to recognise, promote and celebrate excellence in the South Australian contemporary music industry. They commenced in 2012.

Year	Nominee / work	Award	Result (wins only)	Ref.
2024	Aleksiah (Alexia Damokas)	Best New Artist	Won	
2024	Aleksiah (Alexia Damokas)	Best Solo Artist	Won	
2024	Aleksiah (Alexia Damokas)	Most Popular Pop Artist	Won	
2024	Aleksiah (Alexia Damokas)	Emily Burrows Award	awarded	
2025	Aleksiah (Alexia Damokas)	Best Solo Artist	Won	
2025	Cry About It by Aleksiah	Best Release (EP or Album)	Won	
2025	"Clothes Off" by Aleksiah	Best Song	Won	
2025	Aleksiah (Alexia Damokas)	People's Choice Award - Pop	Won	

=== J Awards ===
The J Awards are an annual series of Australian music awards that were established by the Australian Broadcasting Corporation's youth-focused radio station Triple J. They commenced in 2005.

Year	Nominee / work	Award	Result	Ref.
2024	Aleksiah	Unearthed Artist of the Year	Nominated	
