= Wade Forster =

Australian country musician (born 1998)

- Born: 8 September 1998 (age 28); Winton, Queensland
- Origin: Queensland, Australia
- Genre: Country music
- Occupations: Singer; songwriter
- Instrument: Vocals
- Years active: 2021–present

Wade Forster is an Australian country music singer from Queensland, Australia. In 2017, Forster moved to Mount Isa and bought a guitar and began uploading covers between rodeo runs and used money from prize money to record. His debut single "Oneida" was released in July 2021. His debut studio album The Beginning was released in August 2022.

In January 2024, Forster won the Toyota Star Maker Quest at the Tamworth Country Music Festival. In January 2025, Forster released the EP The Drifter.

In November 2025, he released his second album Gooseneck Party, which debuted at #50 on the ARIA Australian Album Chart.

In May 2026, Forster announced the sequel album to Gooseneck Party, entitled The Aftermath, due for release on 14 August 2026, as well as his biggest Australian tour to date. The Aftermath Tour includes shows at theatres in Melbourne, Sydney, Brisbane, Adelaide, and Perth. The tour's shows at Melbourne's Forum sold out in six weeks, and Sydney's Metro Theatre performance sold out during the ticket pre-sale window.

In June 2026, the single "Anytime, Anywhere, Antoinette" debuted at number 17 on the Australian Artist ARIA Charts, and peaked five weeks later in July 2026 at number 12, with Forster the first Australian country artist to debut on the chart since March 2021.

In July 2026, Forster announced the North American leg of The Aftermath Tour, including some of his biggest American headline shows to date, at theatres and clubs across Arizona, Utah, Colorada, Nebraska, Iowa, Illinois, Kentucky and Tennessee, with dates taking place across August and September 2026.

In September 2026, Forster announced a collaborative single with Treaty Oak Revival. Titled "Can of Worms", the Texas country song was released on 10 September 2026.

Forster received 10 nominations for the 2027 CMAAs.

== Discography ==
=== Studio albums ===
Title	Details	Peak chart positions
Title	Details	AUS
The Beginning	Released: August 2022; Label: Wade Forster; Format: digital download, streaming	—
Gooseneck Party	Released: 7 November 2025; Label: Community Music (CM088); Format: CD, digital download, streaming	50
The Aftermath	Released: 14 August 2026; Label: Community Music; Format: CD, LP, digital download, streaming	73

=== Extended plays ===
List of EPs, with selected details
Title	Details
The Drifter	Released: January 2025; Label: Diamond F Records; Format: digital

== Awards and nominations ==
=== AIR Awards ===
The Australian Independent Record Awards (commonly known informally as AIR Awards) is an annual awards night to recognise, promote and celebrate the success of Australia's Independent Music sector.

Year	Nominee / work	Award	Result	Ref.
2026	Gooseneck Party	Best Independent Country Album or EP	Nominated	

=== ARIA Music Awards ===
The ARIA Music Awards is an annual awards ceremony that recognises excellence, innovation, and achievement across all genres of Australian music.

Year	Nominee / work	Award	Result	Ref.
2026	Gooseneck Party	Best Country Album	Nominated	

=== Country Music Association Awards ===
The Country Music Association Awards are presented in Nashville annually by the Country Music Association to honour outstanding achievement in the country music industry. Forster has received one nomination.

Year	Association	Award	For	Result	Ref.
2026	Country Music Association Awards	Global Country Artist Award	Himself	Pending	

=== Country Music Awards (CMAA) ===
The Country Music Awards of Australia (CMAA) (also known as the Golden Guitar Awards) is an annual awards night held in January during the Tamworth Country Music Festival, celebrating recording excellence in the Australian country music industry.

Year	Nominee / work	Award	Result	Ref.
2024	Wade Forster	Toyota Star Maker	Won	
2025	Wade Forster	New Talent of the Year	Nominated	
2026	Wade Forster	Male Artist of the Year	Won	
2026	Wade Forster	New Talent of the Year	Won	
2026	"Take That Buckle Home"	Heritage Song of the Year	Nominated	
2026	"Denim" (with Max Jackson)	Vocal Collaboration of the Year	Nominated	
2027	"Anytime, Anywhere, Antoinette"	Song of the Year	Pending	
2027	"Anytime, Anywhere, Antoinette"	Single of the Year	Pending	
2027	"Strange"	Video of the Year	Pending	
2027	"October" (with Ellis Undercover)	Vocal Collaboration of the Year	Pending	
2027	"Heaven '57"	Heritage Song of the Year	Pending	
2027	Wade Forster	Male Artist of the Year	Pending	
2027	Gooseneck Party	Alt.Country Album of the Year	Pending	
2027	Gooseneck Party	Album of the Year	Pending	
2027	The Aftermath	Contemporary Country Album of the Year	Pending	
2027	The Aftermath	Album of the Year	Pending	
