= To All the Ones That I Love =

Studio album by Press Club
- Released: 2 May 2025
- Length: 35:38
- Producer: Greg Rietwyk

Press Club chronology
Endless Motion (2022)	To All the Ones That I Love (2025)

Singles from To All the Ones That I Love
- 1. "No Pressure" Released: 6 October 2023; 2. "Champagne & Nikes" Released: 7 October 2024; 3. "Wasted Days" Released: 4 December 2024; 4. "Tightrope / Vacate" Released: 22 January 2025; 5. "I Am Everything" Released: 13 March 2025; 6. "To All the Ones That I Love" Released: 30 April 2025

To All the Ones That I Love is the fourth studio album by Australian punk group Press Club. It was self-released on 2 May 2025. The album was produced and mixed by Greg Rietwyk, and mastered by Kris Crummett. It was recorded at the band's Footscray studio. It centers on introspection and growth. The title track was released as a single on 30 April 2025, alongside a music video directed by Nick Manuell.

At the AIR Awards of 2026, it was nominated for Best Independent Punk Album or EP.

== Reception ==
Professional ratings
Review scores
Source	Rating
Clash	8/10
Distorted Sound	6/10
New Noise	4/5 stars
Spill	4.5/5 stars

In a four-star review for New Noise, Karina Selvig stated, "While To All the Ones That I Love sees Press Club lean into the indie rock elements, they have managed to give the songs moments to breathe and let you sink into them." Clash's Julia Mason referred to it as "an album that speaks to all" that "finds Press Club throwing off the shackles as they confidently explore and experiment with their sound."

The album received a rating of 4.5 from Spill, whose reviewer Victoria Love-Rainbow called it "an explosive wave of alternative bliss that will sweep listeners off their feet." Jack McGill of Distorted Sound gave it a rating of six, observing that it "sounds like an album by someone that used to write invigorating rock ballads, but has just lost some of the spark, it's not necessarily bad, but this third [sic] record feels like a shade of Press Club."

== Track listing ==
To All the Ones That I Love track listing
No.	Title	Length
1.	"I Am Everything"	2:52
2.	"Wilt"	3:35
3.	"Champagne & Nikes"	2:36
4.	"Wasted Days"	3:19
5.	"No Pressure"	2:39
6.	"Vacate"	5:34
7.	"To All the Ones That I Love"	3:54
8.	"Tightrope"	3:08
9.	"Staring at the Ceiling"	3:32
10.	"Desolation"	3:49
Total length:		35:38
