= Press Club (band) =

Australian Band

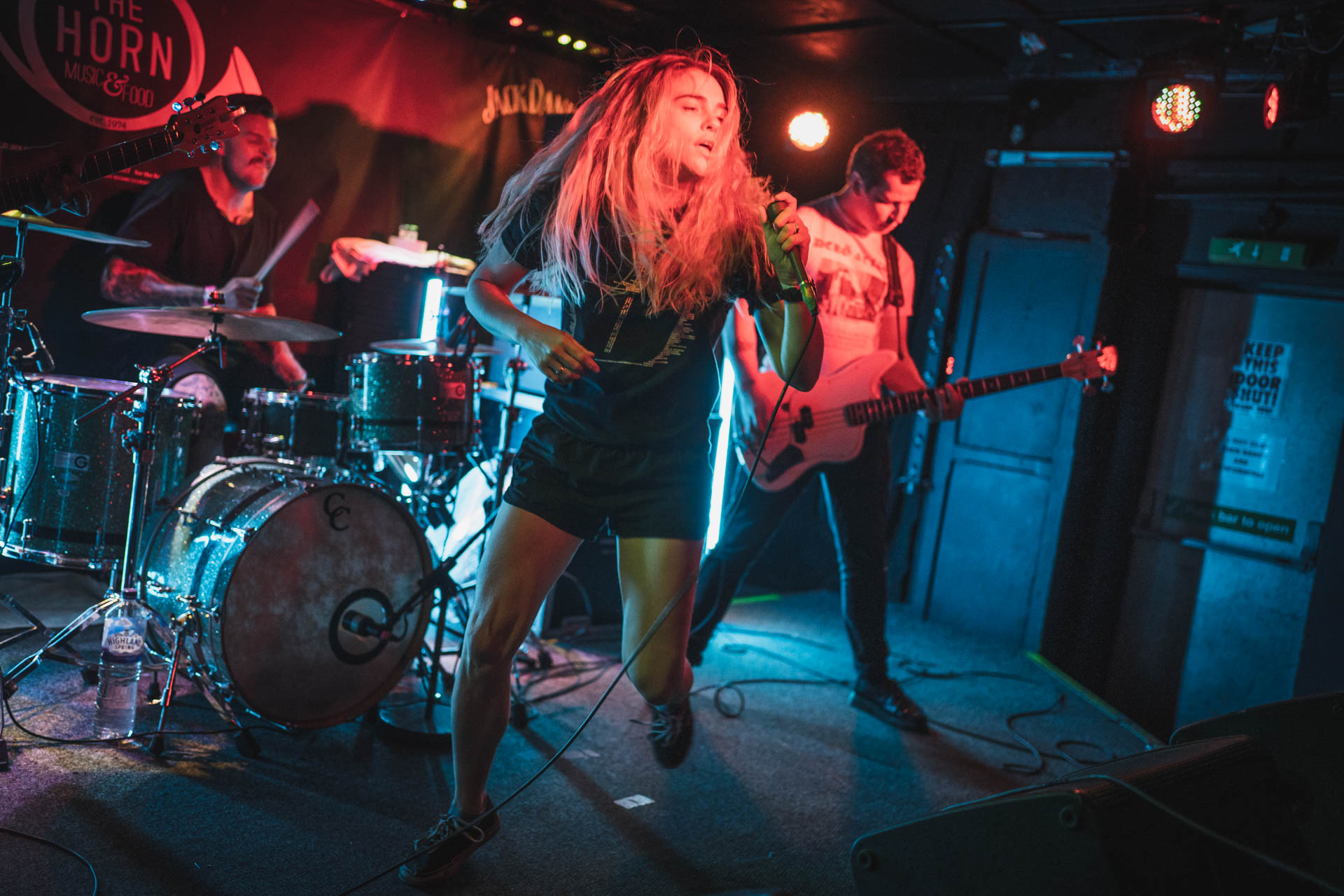
- Press Club performing live at The Horn in St Albans, Hertfordshire.

Background information
- Origin: Melbourne, Victoria
- Genres: Punk music
- Years active: 2017–present
- Label: Independent
- Members: Natalie Foster; Greg Rietwyk; Iain MacRae; Frank Lees
- Website: pressclubmusic.com

Press Club are an Australian rock band who formed in 2017 out of Melbourne, Victoria. The band's line-up includes lead vocalist and occasional guitarist Natalie Foster, guitarist and backing vocalist Greg Rietwyk, bassist Iain MacRae and drummer Frank Lees; it has remained unchanged since their formation. Prior to the formation of the band, Foster made indie folk music under the moniker of Tully On Tully. Their debut single, "Headwreck", was released in May 2017, and their debut album, Late Teens, was released in May 2018. Its follow-up, Wasted Energy, was released in 2019.

Their third album was supposed to be recorded in Germany in 2020, but did not occur due to the COVID-19 pandemic. The album was ultimately recorded in Melbourne over the ensuing year, and released as Endless Motion in October 2022. At the time of its release, drummer Frank Lees said in a statement: "The album is a culmination of years of downtime and introspection, false starts and disappointments, bushfires and pandemics. Factors that forced us to dig out parts of ourselves to sculpt a body of work that was as uncompromising and raw as our previous releases, but executed with more polish and finesse than we thought ourselves capable of." The album was released on 14 October 2022.

In January 2025, the group announced the release of their fourth studio album, To All the Ones That I Love, which came out on 2 May 2025.

== Discography ==
=== Albums ===
List of albums, with selected chart positions
Title	Album details	Peak chart positions
Title	Album details	AUS
Late Teens	Released: March 2018; Format: CD, LP, digital; Label: pressclubmusic (PCMF001)	—
Wasted Energy	Released: August 2019; Format: CD, LP, digital; Label: pressclubmusic (PCMF002)	—
Endless Motion	Released: 14 October 2022; Format: CD, LP, digital; Label: pressclubmusic (PCMF003)	62
To All the Ones That I Love	Released: 2 May 2025; Format: CD, LP, digital; Label: pressclubmusic (PCMF005CD)	71

== Awards and nominations ==
=== AIR Awards ===
The Australian Independent Record Awards (commonly known informally as AIR Awards) is an annual awards night to recognise, promote and celebrate the success of Australia's Independent Music sector.

Year	Nominee / work	Award	Result	Ref.
2023	Endless Motion	Best Independent Punk Album or EP	Nominated	
2026	To All the Ones That I Love	Best Independent Punk Album or EP	Nominated	

=== ARIA Music Awards ===
The ARIA Music Awards is an annual awards ceremony held by the Australian Recording Industry Association. They commenced in 1987.

Year	Nominee / work	Award	Result	Ref.
2025	To All the Ones That I Love	Best Hard Rock/Heavy Metal Album	Nominated	
