= AIR Awards of 2026 =

Annual Australian music awards ceremony

2026 AIR Awards
- Date: 30 July 2026
- Venue: Adelaide Town Hall, Australia

Highlights
- Most wins: Ninajirachi (8)
- Most nominations: Ninajirachi (9)
- Website: https://air.org.au/air-awards/

The 2026 AIR Awards was the twentieth annual Australian Independent Record Labels Association Music Awards ceremony (generally known as the AIR Awards). On 1 February 2026, the date and location was announced alongside the opening of the nomination period (for released between 1 January and 31 December 2025) and closed on 13 March 2026.

In 2026, the dance/electronic award has been expanded. The previous "Best Independent Dance or Electronica Album or EP" is now titled "Best Independent Electronic Album or EP" and two new awards added, "Best Independent Dance/Club Single" and "Best Independent Electronic Single".

The nominations were revealed on 13 May 2026.

== Nominees and winners ==
Winners indicated in boldface, with other nominees in plain.

Independent Album of the Year	Independent Song of the Year
**Ninajirachi - I Love My Computer**; Folk Bitch Trio - Now Would Be a Good Time; The 046 - Legacy in Motion; The Belair Lip Bombs - Again; Way Dynamic - Massive Shoe	**Ninajirachi - "iPod Touch"**; Jem Cassar-Daley - "Kiss Me Like You're Leaving"; Keli Holiday - "Dancing2"; Playlunch - "Keith"; Way Dynamic - "Miffed It"
Breakthrough Independent Artist of the Year	Best Independent Blues and Roots Album or EP
**Folk Bitch Trio**; Georgia Knight; Rageflower; Rona.; Yes Boone	**Folk Bitch Trio - Now Would Be a Good Time**; John Butler - Prism; Liz Stringer - The Second High; Melbourne Ska Orchestra - The Ballad of Monte Loco; Sons of the East - Sons
Best Independent Children's Album or EP	Best Independent Classical Album or EP
**Teeny Tiny Stevies - Brain Fart**; Diver City - Weekend Baby; Emma Memma - Dance Island Party; Justine Clarke - Mimi's Symphony; The Wiggles and The Tree of Wisdom - The Tree of Wisdom	**William Barton and Omega Ensemble - Gift — Our Breath of Life**; Andrea Lam - Piano Diary; Australian String Quartet - Vanessa Perica, String Quartet No. 1 No Feeling is Final; Joseph Tawadros - The Forgotten Path to Humanity; Rose Riebl - Dust
Best Independent Country Album or EP	Best Independent Dance / Club Single
**Ruby Gill - Some Kind of Control**; Emily Lubitz - Two Black Horses; Hayley Jensen - Country Soul; Imogen Clark - Choking on Fuel; Wade Forster - Gooseneck Party	**VV Pete (featuring Utility, Formation Boyz) - "Wassa"**; Confidence Man and Jade - "Gossip"; DJ PGZ and Yikes - "Ouss Ouss"; Fisher - "Stay"; Shouse - "Sunrise"
Best Independent Electronic Single	Best Independent Electronic Album or EP
**Ninajirachi - "iPod Touch"**; Cosmo's Midnight - "45"; Keanu Nelson - Place Where I Go/Kapi Ngalyananni; Robert Baxter and Sweatbaby - "Icy (Take it Off)"; The Superjesus and The Journey - "Something Good"	**Ninajirachi - I Love My Computer**; Essendon Airport - MOR; Mel Blue - No More Jackets Please; Rona. - It's All Here (EP); Shouse - Collective Ecstasy
Best Independent Heavy Album or EP	Best Independent Hip Hop Album or EP
**Thornhill - Bodies**; Battlesnake - Dawn of the Exultants and the Hunt for the Shepherd; Hands Like Houses - Atmospherics; Npcede - Npcede; The Maggie Pills - Hearts Enduring Lingering Loss	**Devaura - Vol. 1 Learning in Public**; Bliss n Eso - The Moon (The Light Side); Elsy Wameyo - Wameyo; Jamaica Moana - Bud & Deni; Teether & Kuya Neil - Yearn IV
Best Independent Jazz Album or EP	Best Independent Pop Album or EP
**Temporary Blessings - Sumbisori**; Natalie Gauci - Pictures of Mars; Phia - When I'm Holding You, I'm Holding Me; The Cat Empire - Bird in Paradise; Touch Sensitive - In Paradise	**Way Dynamic - Massive Shoe**; Georgia Knight - Beanpole; Montaigne - It's Hard to Be a Fish; Stella Donnelly - Love and Fortune; The Tullamarines - Safety Blanket
Best Independent Punk Album or EP	Best Independent Rock Album or EP
**These New South Whales - Godspeed**; Press Club - To All the Ones That I Love; Private Function - ¯\_(ツ)_/¯; Radio Free Alice - Empty Words (EP); Wet Kiss - Thus Spoke the Broken Chanteuse	**Playlunch - Sex Ed**; Spacey Jane - If That Makes Sense; Teen Jesus and the Jean Teasers - Glory; The Belair Lip Bombs - Again; The Southern River Band - Easier Said Than Done
Best Independent Soul/R&B Album or EP	Best Independent Label
**Wilsn - Bloom**; Bumpy - Kanana; Cookin' on 3 Burners - Cookin' the Books; Don West - Give Me All Your Love; Felivand - My Body's My True North	**NLV Records**; ABC Music; Astral People Recordings; College of Knowledge; Mushroom Music
Independent Marketing Team of the Year	Independent Publicity Team of the Year
**NLV Records, The Orchard for Ninajirachi - I Love My Computer**; Mushroom Music for Bliss n Eso - The Moon (The Light Side); Playlunch, ABC Music for Playlunch - "Keith"; Secretly Group for Folk Bitch Trio - Now Would Be a Good Time; The Annex for Ocean Alley - Love Balloon	**Twnty Three for Ninajirachi - I Love My Computer**; Cult Logic for Ocean Alley - Love Balloon; Mushroom Music for Bliss n Eso - The Moon (The Light Side); Mushroom Music for Wilsn - Bloom; Twnty Three for Folk Bitch Trio - Now Would Be a Good Time
Independent Producer of the Year	Independent Mix, Studio or Mastering Engineer of the Year
**Nina Wilson for Ninajirachi - I Love My Computer**; Angus Stone for Dope Lemon - Golden Wolf; Benjamin Stewart for Slowly Slowly - Forgiving Spree; Dylan Young for Way Dynamic - Massive Shoe; Nick DiDia for Ocean Alley - Love Balloon	**Thomas Purcell (p.k.a. Wave Racer) for Ninajirachi - I Love My Computer**; Becki Whitton, Timothy Harvey, Hannah Cameron for Ruby Gill - Some Kind of Control; Leon Zervos for Ocean Alley - Love Balloon; Michael Carpenter for Imogen Clark - Choking on Fuel; Stephen Mowat for Wilsn - Bloom
Independent Music Video of the Year	Outstanding Achievement Award
**Bridgette Winton, Folk Bitch Trio for Folk Bitch Trio - "Cathode Ray"**; Ball Bass John for Ninajirachi - "Fuck My Computer"; Claudia Sangiorgi Dalimore for Miss Kaninna - "Backstreets"; Tas Wilson, James Adams for Jem Cassar-Daley - "Kiss Me Like You're Leaving"; Jasper Van Daatsellar for Way Dynamic - "People Settle Down"	**Sebastian Chase**

== See also ==
- Music of Australia
