= Dean Turnley =

Australian DJ and record producer

- Origin: Geelong, Australia
- Years active: 2011–present

Dean Turnley is an Australian DJ and record producer from Geelong, Victoria and now based in Melbourne. He rose to prominence following the release of single "Actin' Tough" in March 2026. The DJ himself describes his musical output on Instagram as "second beer, first dart kinda tunes".

Turnley is the co-founder of Thailand's Sundancer Festival.

== Career ==
Since 2011, Turnley has toured and played nationally and internationally in the underground music scene. He was a resident DJ at Uno Danceclub in Geelong, and has performed at venues such as Revolver Upstairs, Brown Alley, Killing Time, Circus, and OneSixOne.

Turnley's 7-track EP Studio Diary was released in August 2023. He has since performed at electronic music festivals including Beyond the Valley, Strawberry Fields, Let Them Eat Cake, and Pitch.

On 27 March 2026, Turnley released "Actin' Tough". Upon release, Turnley said, "I made the track on 404 sampler back in December and it's been crazy watching the responses as the track was getting its first spins. Excited for it to be out there."

== Discography ==
=== Extended plays ===
List of EPs, with release date, formats, and label shown
Title	Details
Studio Diary (Volume 1)	Released: 4 August 2023; Label: Dean Turnley (independent); Format: Digital download, streaming

=== Singles ===
List of singles, with title, year, selected chart positions, and album details shown
Title	Year	Peak chart positions					Certification	Album
Title	Year	AUS	IRE	NZ Hot	US Dance/ Elec.	UK Sales	Certification	Album
"Actin' Tough"	2026	80	94	8	21	8	ARIA: Gold	Non-album single

=== Guest appearances ===
List of guest appearances, with lead artist(s), year, and album details shown
Title	Artist(s)	Year	Album
"Jazzy Fox" (Dean Turnley remix)	Reno Renatama	2021	Jazzy Fox Remixes

== Awards and nominations ==
=== ARIA Music Awards ===
The ARIA Music Awards is an annual awards ceremony that recognises excellence, innovation, and achievement across all genres of Australian music.

Year	Nominee / work	Award	Result	Ref.
2026	"Actin' Tough"	Best Dance/Electronic Release	Nominated	
