= MPEG Awards =

Australian music awards

- Country: Australia
- First award: 2024; 2 years ago
- Final award: current

The Music Producer and Engineers Guild of Australia (MPEG) is a non-profit membership organisation that advocates for the rights, commercial interests and community development of music producers and sound engineers. It was established in 2022.

In 2024, they commenced a MPEG Members Forum and began presenting the MPEG Awards.

== Ceremonies ==
A list of awards ceremony dates and award winners are listed below.

=== 2024 ===
The 2024 ceremony took place on 24 February 2024 at Collingwood Yards. It was co-hosted by Eddie Perfect and Mo Sesto.

Award	Nominee/ Winner	Result
Producer of the Year	Eric J Dubowsky	Won
Recording Engineer of the Year	Wayne Connolly	Won
Breakthrough Producer of the Year	Chelsea Warner	Won
Studio of the Year	4000 Studios, Brisbane	Won
Writer Producer of the Year	Rob Amoruso	Won
Self-Producing Artist of the Year	Maribelle Anēs aka Vetta Borne	Won
Outstanding Community Award	Women of Music Production Perth (WOMPP)	Won
Mix Engineer of the Year	Stefan Du Randt	Won
Mastering Engineer of the Year	Leon Zervos	Won
Lifetime Achievement Award	Charles Fisher	awarded

=== 2025 ===
The 2025 ceremony took place on 26 February 2025 in central Sydney.

Award	Nominee/ Winner	Result
Producer of the Year	Chris Collins	Won
Recording Engineer of the Year	Steven Schram	Won
Breakthrough Producer of the Year	Tasker	Won
Studio of the Year	Rolling Stock Recording Rooms	Won
Writer Producer of the Year	Kevin Parker	Won
Self-Producing Artist of the Year	Alice Ivy	Won
Outstanding Community Award	Grid Series Geelong	Won
Mix Engineer of the Year	Stefan Du Randt	Won
Mastering Engineer of the Year	Lachlan Carrick	Won
Overseas Achievement	Dom Dolla	Won
Lifetime Achievement Award	Vanda & Young (Harry Vanda & George Young)	awarded

=== 2026 ===
The 2026 ceremony took place on 25 February 2025 in Sydney.

Award	Nominee/ Winner	Result
Producer of the Year	Alice Ivy	Won
Recording Engineer of the Year	Simon Cohen	Won
Breakthrough Producer of the Year	Ninajirachi	Won
Studio of the Year	4000 Studios, Brisbane	Won
Writer Producer of the Year	Lucy Blomkamp	Won
Self-Producing Artist of the Year	Ninajirachi	Won
Outstanding Community Award	Music Producers Development Program	Won
Mix Engineer of the Year	Thomas Purcell p.k.a. Wave Racer	Won
Mastering Engineer of the Year	Joe Carra	Won
Overseas Achievement	Keanu Beats	Won
Lifetime Achievement Award	Mike Chapman	awarded
