= Anytime, Anywhere, Antoinette =

Single by Wade Forster
- Released: 20 May 2026
- Genre: Country
- Length: 4:18
- Label: Community Music
- Songwriter: Wade Forster
- Producer: Simon Johnson

Wade Forster singles chronology
"Strange" (2026)	"Anytime, Anywhere, Antoinette" (2026)

"Anytime, Anywhere, Antoinette" is a song written and recorded by Australian singer Wade Forster. It was released on 20 May 2026, as the second single from Forster's third studio album The Aftermath. Simon Johnson produced the single.

The song was nominated for Single of the Year and Song of the Year at the 2027 Country Music Awards of Australia.

== Chart performance ==
"Anytime, Anywhere, Antoinette" is Forster's first entry on the ARIA Australian Singles Chart, debuting on the chart dated 22 June 2026, and peaking five weeks later at number 12. The song was the first song by an Australian country artist to debut on the ARIA Australian Singles Chart since February 2021.

== Charts ==
Chart (2026)	Peak position
Australian Artist Singles (ARIA)	12
