= Billionhappy =

Chinese rapper

Billionhappy, born Han Yi, is a Chinese rapper. He is known for being a pioneer of Nu China, or Chinese underground music—replete with electronic, hyperpop, and hip-hop influences—in the 2020s.

== Career ==
During the pandemic, Billionhappy studied menswear at the London College of Fashion.

In 2024, Billionhappy's single "Chinese in Europe" went viral and became representative of Chinese coming-of-age in the time of the globalized internet.

== Style ==
In 2026, Dazed and other publications considered Billionhappy to be "the figurehead" of Nu China, or China's then-newly emerging music underground consisting of "global-facing, tech-savvy young people." Dazed also called him a "rising star in the Chinese hyperpop scene," describing his sound as "a spacey restructuring of classic Chinese pop songs blitzed together with glitchy beats and blown-out 808s."

Billionhappy told Dazed that Nu China's relative lateness resulted from the late arrival of the internet to China's youth, which allowed them to access subcultures from the west and other Asian countries. He named 2hollis as a particular influence on himself and Chinese youth in the 2020s.
