= Izzy Camina =

- Born: Isadora Camina; Los Angeles, California, U.S.
- Genres: Electro, electronic pop, lo-fi
- Occupations: Singer, songwriter, record producer
- Years active: 2016–present

Isadora "Izzy" Camina is a British-American music producer. Born in Venice, California, Izzy began making beats on Fruity Loops in high school, before transitioning to Ableton Live. She released independently under the name ISADORA, including her self written and produced EP, Battle Royale. Two of the songs off of the EP reached the top 25 on Spotify's UK Viral Charts.

In 2020, under "Izzy Camina", she released the tracks "UP N DOWN", "Nihilist In The Club", and "Kill Your Local Indie Softboy".

She cites Jersey club, UK garage, experimental electronic, synth wave, post punk, and pop as genre influences. In 2020, she described her music as “Cyberpunk Britney Spears”.
