= EDM.com =

American media platform covering electronic music

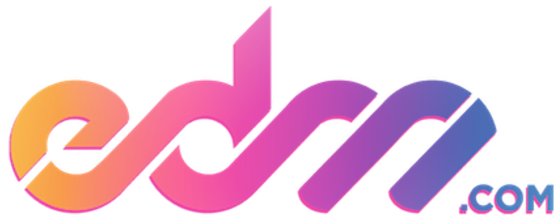
- Website type: Music, Media and Entertainment
- Available in: English
- Founded: 2013
- Headquarters: Los Angeles, California, United States
- Editor: Jason Heffler
- Parent: The EDM Network
- Website: edm.com
- Launched: January 1, 2014

EDM.com is an American media platform founded in 2013 that primarily covers the electronic dance music (EDM) industry. The website features breaking news, artist interviews, music reviews, human interest articles, editorials, and more. The website also has over 2 million monthly visitors and partners with Red Bull, Tidal, 7UP, Insomniac, ID&T, Live Nation, Pioneer DJ, SiriusXM and more.

== History ==
EDM.com was founded by Ethan Baer in 2013. It was subsequently acquired in November 2013 by The EDM Network, which also owns YourEDM.com. CEO Jason Muir said of the acquisition, "EDM.com represents for us the culmination of three years of work and hundreds of millions of plays across our platforms. We are now working with world-leading developers to ensure that EDM.com will become the central hub for Electronic Dance Music within the digital space, something greatly needed in an industry dominated by physical presence and live events". The website was then launched on January 1, 2014, officially commencing the service.

In 2015, EDM.com was nominated for Best Music Media Resource at the 30th Annual International Dance Music Awards, and was nominated for the same award again the following year at the 31st Annual International Dance Music Awards.

In March 2018, EDM.com launched "EDM.com Chill Radio", a 24-hour live stream featuring chill music from the Artist Intelligence Agency label, exclusive new track premieres, and previews of unreleased tracks.

EDM.com has over 10 million followers across social networks and their articles have been quoted in Billboard, Forbes, The New York Times, Pitchfork, NME, USA Today, Verdens Gang and more.
