= Wave Racer =

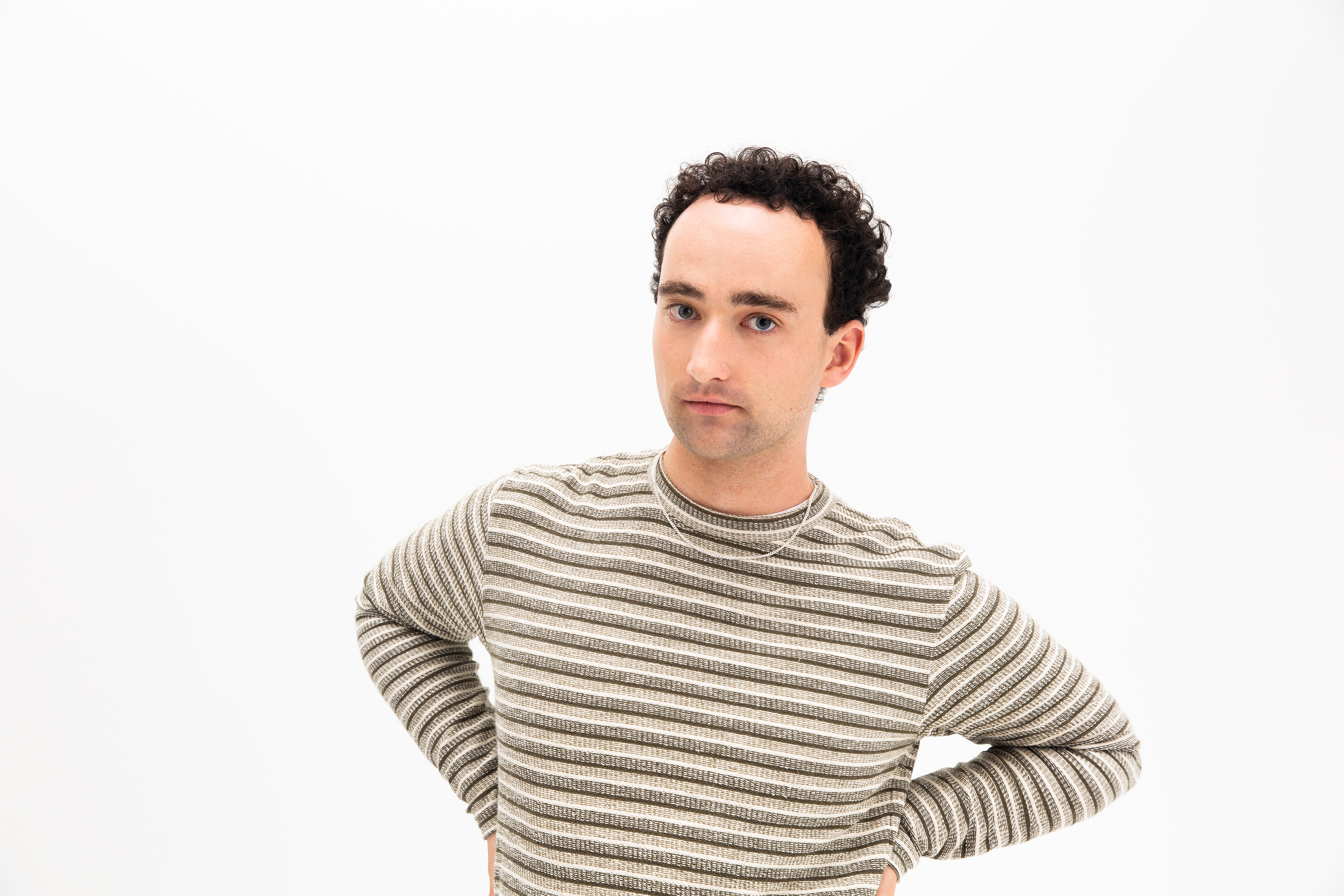
- Wave Racer in 2021

Background information
- Born: Thomas Michael Purcell; 26 April 1992 (age 34); Sydney, New South Wales, Australia
- Genres: Future bass, alternative, electronic
- Occupations: Musician; record producer; Songwriter
- Instruments: Digital audio workstation, electric guitar, synthesiser, vocals
- Years active: 2013–present
- Labels: Future Classic; PIAS, Astral People Recordings
- Website: http://www.waveracer.band

Thomas Michael Purcell, known professionally as Wave Racer, is an Australian musician, multi-instrumentalist and music producer. The name "Wave Racer" is adapted from the Nintendo 64 game Wave Race 64. His debut single, consisting of two songs, "Rock U Tonite" and "Stoopid", was released in 2013. The same year, he signed with Australian independent record label Future Classic, who also signed other electronic artists, including Cashmere Cat and Flume.

His "Flash Drive" EP was released in 2015, featuring a guest appearance by Lido. In 2021, he released his debut full-length album, To Stop From Falling Off The Earth.

He has performed in the United States at Ultra Music Festival, on Mad Decent's Block Party Tour and in support of Chromeo on their "Frequent Flyer Tour". Australian festival highlights include Splendour In The Grass, Field Day, Groovin' the Moo and Falls Festival. He has also toured in support of Disclosure during their Australian tour in 2014, and Porter Robinson during his Australian tour in 2015, alongside Cosmo's Midnight.

== Early life and career ==
Purcell was born in Sydney, New South Wales on 26 April 1992. He has cited his start in electronic dance music production as being part of a disco house duo with his friend called "Pablo J & The Lobsterettes". Speaking about the comparison of his music to the likes of Cashmere Cat and Hudson Mohawke, Purcell quoted them as massive influences and said "...people often describe my music as future bass".

In 2014, he released the stand-alone single "Streamers". It was described as a 'tropical, glitchy tune' with elements of trap and futuristic indie-dance. In 2015, he released the songs "Flash Drive (featuring B▲BY)" and "World Record (featuring Lido)", as singles for his debut EP Flash Drive. The EP consisted of 4 tracks and was released on October 15, 2015. The title track, "Flash Drive", was featured in the official soundtrack for the 2016 racing video game Forza Horizon 3.

In 2017, Wave Racer's remix of Flight Facilities' "Stand Still" was sampled without clearance by Fetty Wap in his song "Way You Are".

On April 24, 2021, Wave Racer performed live as a part of Porter Robinson's virtual festival Secret Sky. The performance featured Wave Racer playing his original music with a live band.

On August 6, 2021, Wave Racer was featured on Triple J's "Like A Version" segment, in which he performed a cover of The 1975's "It's Not Living (If It's Not With You)", as well as his single "Look Up To Yourself".

On October 29, 2021, Wave Racer released his debut full-length album To Stop From Falling Off The Earth through Astral People Recordings, a co-operative record label formed with PIAS. The album contains 11 songs, and for the first time, features Purcell's own vocal performances and lyrics, as well as the prominent use of electric guitar and synthesisers. The album received 4 out of 5 stars in reviews from NME and Rolling Stone Australia. The album also received praise from French electronic musician Madeon.

== Awards ==
In 2013, Wave Racer was nominated for a J Award in the "Unearthed Artist of the Year" category. In 2015, he won the FBi SMAC (Sydney's Music Arts & Culture) Award for "Best Producer".

In 2025, he was nominated for Mix Engineer of the Year at the Music Producer & Engineers' Guild of Australia (MPEG) Awards.

Year	Award	Nominee / Work	Result
2013	J Award for Unearthed Artist of the Year	Himself	Nominated
2015	FBi SMAC Award for Best Producer	Himself	Won
2025	Music Producer & Engineers' Guild of Australia Award for Mix Engineer of the Year	Himself	Nominated

=== AIR Awards ===
The Australian Independent Record Awards (commonly known informally as AIR Awards) is an annual awards night to recognise, promote and celebrate the success of Australia's Independent Music sector.

Year	Nominee / work	Award	Result	Ref.
2026	Thomas Purcell (p.k.a. Wave Racer) for Ninajirachi - I Love My Computer	Independent Mix, Studio or Mastering Engineer of the Year	Nominated	

=== ARIA Music Awards ===
The ARIA Music Awards is an annual awards ceremony that recognises excellence, innovation, and achievement across all genres of Australian music.

Year	Nominee / work	Award	Result
2025	Thomas Purcell (Wave Racer) for Ninajirachi – I Love My Computer	Best Engineered Release	Nominated
2026	Thomas Purcell (Wave Racer) for 2charm – Star Scum City	Best Engineered Release	Nominated

=== MPEG Awards ===
The Music Producer and Engineers’ Guild (MPEG Awards) Awards celebrate excellence in music production and engineering in Australia. They commenced in 2024.

Year	Nominee / work	Award	Result (wins only)	Ref.
2026	Thomas Purcell p.k.a. Wave Racer	Mix Engineer of the Year	Won	

== Discography ==
=== Studio albums ===
Title	Details
To Stop From Falling Off The Earth	Released: 29 October 2021; Label: Astral People Recordings / PIAS; Format: Digital download, 12" Vinyl

=== EPs ===
Title	Details	Peak chart positions
Title	Details	US Dance
Flash Drive	Released: 16 October 2015; Label: Future Classic; Format: Digital download, USB keychain	15

=== Singles ===
Title	Year	Label	Album
"Rock U Tonite"	2013	Future Classic	Rock U Tonite/Stoopid
"Stoopid"	2013	Future Classic	Rock U Tonite/Stoopid
"Streamers"	2014	Future Classic	Non-album single
"Flash Drive" (featuring B▲BY)	2015	Future Classic	Flash Drive
"AUTO"	2019	Astral People Recordings / PIAS	To Stop From Falling Off The Earth
"Summer Rain" (featuring Kwame)	2019	Astral People Recordings / PIAS	Non-album single
"This N That" (featuring LunchMoney Lewis)	2019	Astral People Recordings / PIAS	Non-album single
"Higher"	2020	Astral People Recordings / PIAS	Non-album single
"Left Behind"	2021	Astral People Recordings / PIAS	To Stop From Falling Off The Earth
"What Are We Waiting For?"	2021	Astral People Recordings / PIAS	To Stop From Falling Off The Earth
"Look Up To Yourself"	2021	Astral People Recordings / PIAS	To Stop From Falling Off The Earth
"Dreaming"	2021	Astral People Recordings / PIAS	To Stop From Falling Off The Earth
"Heart's Not In It"	2022	Astral People Recordings / PIAS	Non-album single

=== Remixes ===
2013

- Flight Facilities featuring Mickey Green – "Stand Still (Wave Racer Remix)"
- Panama – "Always (Wave Racer Remix)"
- DCUP featuring Mereki – "Don't Be Shy (Wave Racer Remix)"
- Cosmo's Midnight – "The Dofflin (Wave Racer Remix)"
- Ghost Town DJ's – "My Boo (Wave Racer Remix)"

2014

- Foster The People – "Best Friend (Wave Racer Remix)"
- Ryan Hemsworth – "Ryan Must Be Destroyed (Wave Racer Remix)"

2015

- Duke Dumont – "The Giver (Reprise) (Wave Racer Remix)"
- Snakehips featuring Chance The Rapper & Tinashe – "All My Friends (Wave Racer Remix)"

2016

- Flume featuring Kai – "Never Be like You (Wave Racer Remix)"

2017

- Tkay Maidza featuring Killer Mike – "Carry On (Wave Racer Remix)"

2023

- Ninajirachi – Wayside (Wave Racer Remix)

=== Covers ===
2021

- "Seventeen" – cover of No Rome
- "It's Not Living (If It's Not With You)" – cover of The 1975 (performed live for Triple J's "Like A Version")
