= Nina Las Vegas =

Australian radio host, DJ and music producer (b. 1984)

- Born: Nina Elizabeth Agzarian; 18 December 1984 (age 41); Wagga Wagga, New South Wales, Australia
- Presenting career
- Show: Mix Up Exclusives
- Station: Triple J
- Network: Australian Broadcasting Corporation (ABC)
- Country: Australia
- Previous show: House Party

Nina Elizabeth Agzarian (born 18 December 1984), known professionally by her stage name Nina Las Vegas, is an Australian radio host, DJ and music producer. From 2009 to 2014 she was the host of House Party on national radio station Triple J. She released compilation albums, House Party Volume 1 (3 August 2012) and House Party Volume 2 (2 August 2013), which appeared on the ARIA Charts. In 2015 she started her own music recording label, NLV Records. Las Vegas is also signed to the label.

== Biography ==
=== 1984–2006: Early life ===
Nina Elizabeth Agzarian was born on 18 December 1984 in Wagga Wagga, the second daughter to an Armenian-Egyptian father, Michael (Graphic Designer and Advertiser of Advision (Surry Hills, Australia)) and Australian mother, Janine née Bishop (a teacher at St Joseph's Primary School). She attended South Wagga Public School. At eighteen, she moved to Sydney to commence university, where she started working in radio production. In 2004 she began an internship at national youth radio broadcaster, Triple J, where she adopted the stage name of Nina Las Vegas.

=== 2007–2015: Heaps Decent & House Party ===
In 2007, Agzarian, Andrew Levins (a Sydney DJ) and Diplo (an American DJ, music producer, and songwriter) established Heaps Decent as a non-profit organisation which supports emerging underprivileged and indigenous musicians. Heaps Decent offers ongoing music programs at schools, juvenile justice centres and youth drop-in centres in New South Wales.

From 2009 to 2014 Agzarian was the host of House Party on Triple J. On 3 August 2012 Triple J released a double album, House Party Volume 1, where she mixed the tracks for various artists. The album peaked at number 2 on the ARIA Compilation Albums chart.

On 2 August 2013, Triple J issued a follow-up compilation album, House Party Volume 2, again with Agzarian mixing for various artists, which was also certified Gold. Both compilation albums made the ARIA top 25 dance albums of the year for the respective year of their release.

During this time she curated and toured with acts such as Flume, Beni, What So Not, Flight Facilities, Wave Racer, Indian Summer and Tyler Touché across the country as part of the Triple J House Party and 'NLV Presents' National Tours. She performed at Stereosonic and Splendour in the Grass in 2014, which attracted some criticism as she was a DJ and not a musician. She selected the soundtrack for the Sydney New Year's Eve fireworks to bring in 2015.

=== 2014–present: Solo releases ===
In 2014, Agzarian released her first official single "Don't Send", with Melbourne producer Swick on American DJ and music producer, Skrillex's online label, Nest HQ.

In 2015, Agzarian announced her tour of the United States including performances at South by Southwest and the Winter Music Conference. As of February 2015 Agzarian produces and presents Mix Up Exclusives on Triple J, on Saturdays from 9 to 10 p.m. Agazarian has since resigned from Triple J to pursue her record label 'NLV Records' and solo career.

In March 2020 in response to the pandemic, Agzarian and her partner left London to move back home with her parents in Wagga Wagga.

She released "Impossible" on 10 April 2020.

== Discography ==
=== Compilation albums ===
List of compilation albums, with Australian chart positions
Title	Album details	Peak chart positions
Title	Album details	AUS Compilation
Triple J House Party (Mixed by Nina Las Vegas)	Released: 3 August 2012; Label: ABC, UMA (5339476); Formats: CD, digital download	2
Triple J House Party Volume Two (Mixed by Nina Las Vegas)	Released: 23 Aug 2013; Label: ABC, UMA (5344789); Formats: CD, digital download	1

=== Extended plays ===
Title	Details
Cool Sports (with Swick)	Released: 29 October 2015; Label: Fool's Gold Records (FGR123); Format: DD
Ezy or Never	Released: 4 August 2016; Label: NLV Records (NLVR0004); Format: DD
Lucky Girl	Released: 20 July 2018; Label: NLV Records; Format: DD

=== Singles ===
Title	Year	Album
"Don't Send" (with Swick)	2014	non album single
"Ezy"	2016	Ezy or Never
"Substitute" (featuring Swick)	2016	Ezy or Never
"Now or Never" (featuring C.Z. & Swick)	2016	Ezy or Never
"Deserts"	2017	non album singles
"Freeze"	2017	non album singles
"Hydration" (with Swick)	2018	non album singles
"Lucky Girl" (featuring Swick)	2018	Lucky Girl
"One Thirty" (with Anna Lunoe)	2019	TBA
"Tananaram" (with Swick & MC Bin Laden)	2019	TBA
"Impossible" (with Thai Chi Rose)	2020	TBA

== Awards and nominations ==
=== AIR Awards ===
The Australian Independent Record Awards (commonly known informally as AIR Awards) is an annual awards night to recognise, promote and celebrate the success of Australia's Independent Music sector.

Year	Nominee / work	Award	Result
2019	Lucky Girl	Best Independent Dance/Electronic Album	Nominated
