= Bigger in Texas =

2024 song by Megan Thee Stallion

Single by Megan Thee Stallion

from the album Megan: Act II
- Released: October 25, 2024
- Genre: Slab music Southern hip hop
- Length: 2:32
- Label: Hot Girl; Warner
- Songwriters: Megan Pete; Joel Banks; Taylor Banks; Shawn "Source" Jarrett; Han Yang Kingsley Wang; Trevin Clay
- Producers: Bankroll Got It; Shawn "Source" Jarrett; Kingsley; Truckee Street

Megan Thee Stallion singles chronology
"BBA" (2024)	"Bigger in Texas" (2024)	"Strategy" (2024)

Music video
- "Bigger in Texas" on YouTube

"Bigger in Texas" is a song by American rapper and songwriter Megan Thee Stallion. It was released on October 25, 2024, through Hot Girl Productions and Warner Music Group, as the second single from Megan: Act II, a reissue of her third studio album, Megan (2024). It was produced by Bankroll Got It, Shawn "Source" Jarrett, Han Yang Kingsley Wang, and Truckee Street.

== Composition and lyrics ==
The song heavily incorporates elements of southern hip hop, especially the regional sound of Texas, and the style has been compared to that of hip hop group UGK. In the lyrics, Megan Thee Stallion celebrates her success and wealth, beginning the track with the chorus: "I'm at the top of my game, I'm who they hate / This shit come with the fame, that's how I knew that I made it / I woke up lookin' this good, I'm in my prime, these niggas gotta get played / If these bitches ain't mad, I need to go harder, I can't let 'em think we the same". She further reflects on loving herself regardless of her appearance and reinforces the point of not caring about the opinions of others, ending the song with the lyrics "Always beggin' me to crash out with these losers, shut up, enjoy this music / Y'all gon' learn I move on my time and not for none of y'all amusement".

== Critical reception ==
Angel Diaz of Billboard wrote "Megan's flow is already reminiscent of those that came before her — like Port Arthur's UGK and Memphis' 8Ball & MJG — who ironically helped cultivate Texas' signature smooth, playa sound, with the help of Houston producer Tony Draper and his record label Suave House. The way she raps already goes perfectly with that type of production style, synonymous with the Lone Star State." Zachary Horvath of HotNewHipHop stated "Meg brings her patented flow, adlibs, bars, and the whole bit and it's a pretty impressive display regardless of how much you've heard this formula. There are some hilarious flashes of her humor as well with gut-busting bars like, 'Pockets gettin' thickеr and thicker, I'm tastin' the money, it look likе I ate a few hundreds / I just hopped on a G6, I'm gettin' head while I'm playin' my Switch, hm.'" Sidney Madden of NPR wrote that Megan Thee Stallion "gives her home state a new classic that's equal parts sexy slink and sharp-tongued self-coronation". Matthew Ritchie of Pitchfork described the song as a "standout track [that] stands as a reminder of what a relaxed Megan can sound like".

Critics' year-end rankings of "Bigger in Texas"
Publication	List	Rank	Ref.
NPR	124 Best Songs of 2024	—N/a	

== Music video ==
An official music video premiered alongside the song. Directed by Megan Thee Stallion and Julian Klincewicz, it opens with the flag of Texas waving in the wind and a title card presented in diamond-encrusted font, referencing mixtape covers designed by Pen & Pixel. The clip first shows Megan flaunting her grills with a smile, before leaning on a trunk lid of an orange slab with swangas while dressed in an all-denim outfit consisting of a bikini top, booty shorts and knee-high boots. She also drives around her hometown of Houston. Next, she visits Johnny Dang at his jewelry store, where she appears in a serpent-like green cowboy hat, a matching bikini (as a reference to her songs "Cobra", "Hiss", and "Boa"), and blond hair with long locks. and twerks inside. In a split shot, the left scene finds Dang presenting Megan with a butterfly diamond necklace from behind the counter, pairing with her flapping wings tattoo on the back of her thighs, while the right scene shows a butterfly sitting on her hand. In another scene, Megan wears a Houston Astros hat decorated with sequins and dances in a lowrider. She appears alongside rapper Scarface, who also wears an Astros cap. Toward the end, Megan is at a dance party in an outdoor parking lot with fellow Houston rappers Scarface, Paul Wall, Slim Thug, and Sauce Walka, before the video closes out with a shot of the downtown Houston skyline.

== Charts ==
Chart performance for "Bigger in Texas"
Chart (2024–2025)	Peak position
New Zealand Hot Singles (RMNZ)	24
US Billboard Hot 100	84
US Hot R&B/Hip-Hop Songs (Billboard)	31
US Rhythmic Airplay (Billboard)	39

== Certifications ==
Certifications for "Bigger in Texas"
Region	Certification	Certified units/sales
United States (RIAA)	Gold	500,000^{‡}
^{‡} Sales+streaming figures based on certification alone.

== Release history ==
Release dates and formats for "Bigger in Texas"
Region	Date	Format	Label	Ref.
Various	October 25, 2024	Digital download; streaming	Hot Girl; Warner	
