= Triple J's Hottest 100 of 2025 =

33rd annual Australian music poll

2025 Triple J Hottest 100

Countdown details
- Date of countdown: 24 January 2026
- Charity partner: We Are Mobilise

Countdown highlights
- Winning song: Olivia Dean "Man I Need"
- Most entries: Olivia Dean (Note: Four times solo (1, 7, 11, 62), once with Sam Fender (14)); Spacey Jane (5 tracks each)

Chronology
← Previous; Australian Songs (2025)	Next → —

The 2025 Triple J Hottest 100 was broadcast on 24 January 2026. It was the 33rd annual countdown of the most popular songs of the year, as voted by listeners of Australian youth radio station Triple J. Throughout the following week, the station announced the Hottest 200, counting down songs 200–101 from 27 January through to 31 January 2026. Merchandise sales from the event will support homelessness charity We Are Mobilise.

English singer Olivia Dean's song "Man I Need" was voted in at number one, and Dean tied with Australian band Spacey Jane for the most entries in the countdown, with five each. Dean became the third consecutive female solo artist to win the countdown after Chappell Roan and Doja Cat topped the countdown in 2024 and 2023, respectively.

== Background ==
Previously, the 2024 Hottest 100 featured just 29 Australian songs, the lowest representation for Australian music since the 1996 poll.

== Voting ==
Online voting opened on 8 December 2025, and closed on 15 January 2026. Individuals could vote for up to 10 songs released between 1 December 2024 and 30 November 2025. A maximum of five songs per artist were included in the voting list.

=== Eligibility ===
On 8 December 2025, Triple J announced the following criteria for songs to be eligible for the Hottest 100:

- Each song must have had its initial release between 1 December 2024 and 30 November 2025;
- Covers, live recordings of previously unreleased songs and remixes are eligible;
- If a song has been significantly reworked (edited/remixed/re-recorded) after its initial release, the reworked song is eligible;
- Live versions of songs by (and previously released by) an act are not eligible.

Votes generated as part of a competition promoting a song and/or artist would not be counted. Campaigns that would "undermine the Hottest 100" may result in that song and/or artist being disqualified from the countdown.

=== Projections ===
In December 2025, Australian online bookmaker Sportsbet favoured "Man I Need" by British artist Olivia Dean (placed at number 1), followed by "iPod Touch" by 2025 J Award winner Ninajirachi (placed at number 27), "Dancing2" by Keli Holiday (placed at number 2) and "Keith" by Playlunch (placed at number 4). All artists except Keli Holiday had not previously appeared in the Hottest 100, with Holiday's appearances occurring through Peking Duk. On 22 January 2026, Guardian Australia declared "Man I Need" to be the clear favourite to win the countdown.

== Full list ==
Note: Australian artists

#	Song	Artist	Country of origin
1	Man I Need	Olivia Dean	United Kingdom
2	Dancing2	Keli Holiday	Australia
3	Dracula	Tame Impala	Australia
4	Keith	Playlunch	Australia
5	Where Is My Husband!	Raye	United Kingdom
6	Whateverrrr	Spacey Jane	Australia
7	Nice to Each Other	Olivia Dean	United Kingdom
8	12 to 12	Sombr	United States
9	No Broke Boys	Disco Lines and Tinashe	United States
10	Please Don't Move to Melbourne	Ball Park Music	Australia
11	So Easy (To Fall in Love)	Olivia Dean	United Kingdom
12	Victory Lap	Fred Again, PlaqueBoyMax and Skepta	United Kingdom/United States
13	Sally, When the Wine Runs Out	Role Model	United States
14	Rein Me In	Sam Fender and Olivia Dean	United Kingdom
15	The Subway	Chappell Roan	United States
16	Dreamin'	Dom Dolla featuring Daya	Australia/United States
17	Love Balloon	Ocean Alley	Australia
18	Undressed	Sombr	United States
19	Back to Friends	Sombr	United States
20	Fame Is a Gun	Addison Rae	United States
21	Car	Royel Otis	Australia
22	What Was That	Lorde	New Zealand
23	Disco Cowgirl	G Flip	Australia
24	Sugar on My Tongue	Tyler, the Creator	United States
25	All the Noise	Spacey Jane	Australia
26	Sports Car	Tate McRae	Canada
27	iPod Touch	Ninajirachi	Australia
28	Loser	Tame Impala	Australia
29	Anxiety	Doechii	United States
30	Basic Being Basic	Djo	United States
31	Through My Teeth	Spacey Jane	Australia
32	Stay	Fisher	Australia
33	You're a Star	Fred Again and Amyl and the Sniffers	United Kingdom/Australia
34	Moody	Royel Otis	Australia
35	Who's Your Boyfriend	Royel Otis	Australia
36	End of Summer	Tame Impala	Australia
37	The Giver	Chappell Roan	United States
38	Pussy Palace	Lily Allen	United Kingdom
39	Estimated Delivery	Spacey Jane	Australia
40	My Old Ways	Tame Impala	Australia
41	I'm on Fire (Like a Version)	Keli Holiday	Australia
42	How to Kill Houseplants	Spacey Jane	Australia
43	First Blush	Ocean Alley	Australia
44	Drenched	Ocean Alley	Australia
45	Tit for Tat	Tate McRae	Canada
46	Yosemite	Kettama and Interplanetary Criminal	Ireland/United Kingdom
47	Fuck My Computer	Ninajirachi	Australia
48	It Gets Better (Forever Mix)	Kettama	Ireland
49	Khe Sanh (Like a Version)	Beddy Rays	Australia
50	In Another Life	G Flip	Australia
51	Talk of the Town	Fred Again, Sammy Virji and Reggie	United Kingdom/Ireland
52	Revolving Door	Tate McRae	Canada
53	Melodramatic Fanatic	Lime Cordiale and Ruel	Australia
54	Say Something	Royel Otis	Australia
55	Catalonia Dreams	The Terrys	Australia
56	Yougotmefeeling	Parcels	Australia
57	One Thing	Lola Young	United Kingdom
58	Backseat	Balu Brigada	New Zealand
59	Nokia	Drake	Canada
60	Dealer	Lola Young	United Kingdom
61	Balcony	Teen Jesus and the Jean Teasers	Australia
62	Lady Lady	Olivia Dean	United Kingdom
63	White Keys	Dominic Fike	United States
64	Illegal	PinkPantheress	United Kingdom
65	Headphones On	Addison Rae	United States
66	Delete Ya	Djo	United States
67	Don't Happy, Be Worry	Hilltop Hoods	Australia
68	It's Amazing to Be Young	Fontaines D.C.	Ireland
69	Shut You Out	The Rions	Australia
70	Take On Me (Like a Version)	The Dreggs	Australia
71	David	Lorde	New Zealand
72	A Cold Play	The Kid Laroi	Australia
73	It's Raining Men (Like a Version)	Playlunch	Australia
74	Bed on Fire	G Flip	Australia
75	Divine Feelings	Vance Joy	Australia
76	All I Am	Ninajirachi	Australia
77	Leave Me Alone	Reneé Rapp	United States
78	Everybody Scream	Florence and the Machine	United Kingdom
79	Arm's Length	Sam Fender	United Kingdom
80	Mangetout	Wet Leg	United Kingdom
81	Parachute	Hayley Williams	United States
82	Miss Erotica	Peach PRC	Australia
83	Everyone Will See It	Old Mervs	Australia
84	Send It Back	Don West	Australia
85	Never Coming Home	Hilltop Hoods and Six60	Australia/New Zealand
86	Something Bigger Than This	Hilltop Hoods	Australia
87	Left of the Dealer	Ocean Alley	Australia
88	West End Girl	Lily Allen	United Kingdom
89	Blackberries	Fisher and Bbyclose	Australia/United Kingdom
90	Tonight's Entertainment	The Rions	Australia
91	We Don't Talk	The Dreggs	Australia
92	Lover Girl	Laufey	Iceland
93	Gossip	Confidence Man and Jade	Australia/United Kingdom
94	DTMF	Bad Bunny	United States
95	Caramel	Sleep Token	United Kingdom
96	Ecstasy	Keli Holiday	Australia
97	Running on Empty	The Tullamarines	Australia
98	Don't Go	Old Mervs	Australia
99	Delete	Ninajirachi	Australia
100	Potion	Djo	United States

=== #101–200 list ===
Between 27 and 31 January 2026, Triple J announced the songs that made the #101–200 positions, revealing 20 songs per day, and replaying the full list on the final day as well as announcing the final 20.

#	Song	Artist	Country of origin
101	Real Estate Apps	Playlunch featuring Aunty Donna	Australia
102	Did It Again (Like a Version)	Paul Kelly	Australia
103	Chasing Hearts	Dice	Australia
104	Man of the Year	Lorde	New Zealand
105	Infohazard	Ninajirachi	Australia
106	Sue Me	Audrey Hobert	United States
107	Jealous Type	Doja Cat	United States
108	Pavement	Mallrat	Australia
109	Check	Bbno$	Canada
110	Ain't It Fun (Like a Version)	The Rions	Australia
111	Last Girls at the Party	The Beaches	Canada
112	Gasoline (Like a Version)	Djo	United States
113	BMF	SZA	United States
114	Death Cult Zombie	Genesis Owusu	Australia
115	Not OK	5 Seconds of Summer	Australia
116	If It Makes You Happy (Like a Version)	Skegss	Australia
117	Emergence	Sleep Token	United Kingdom
118	H.O.O.D (2025 Mix)	Kneecap	United Kingdom
119	No Reply	Tame Impala	Australia
120	I Don't Wanna Regret	G Flip	Australia
121	Tobeloved	Parcels	Australia
122	Sweet n' Low	Peach PRC	Australia
123	1-800	Bbno$ and Ironmouse	Canada/United States
124	Boys	Playlunch	Australia
125	Nosebleeds	Doechii	United States
126	Working Class Hero	Pacific Avenue	Australia
127	Ring Ring Ring	Tyler, the Creator	United States
128	92 Purebred	Ruby Fields	Australia
129	How Does It Feel?	The Kid Laroi	Australia
130	See You Again	Old Mervs	Australia
131	Horses	Mallrat	Australia
132	No Room for a Saint	Dom Dolla featuring Nathan Nicholson	Australia/United Kingdom
133	Lovesick Lullaby	Yungblud	United Kingdom
134	Relationships	Haim	United States
135	All I Really Want	Yes Boone	Australia
136	Cut His Dick Off	G Flip	Australia
137	Cobra	Geese	United States
138	I Can Die Now	Ruel	Australia
139	The Gift	Hilltop Hoods featuring Marlon	Australia
140	Centrelink Summer	Suzi	Australia
141	Get Knocked Down	The Dreggs	Australia
142	Hold My Hand	The Jungle Giants	Australia
143	How Are You Mine?	Slowly Slowly	Australia
144	The Actor	Folk Bitch Trio	Australia
145	Think About Us	Sonny Fodera, D.O.D and Poppy Baskcomb	Australia/United Kingdom
146	Birds	Turnstile	United States
147	Monsoon	Emma Louise and Flume	Australia
148	Taxes	Geese	United States
149	So Excited	Skegss	Australia
150	Hey You	The Belair Lip Bombs	Australia
151	Shapeshifter	Lorde	New Zealand
152	The Winner Takes It All (Like a Version)	Carla Wehbe	Australia
153	Stateside	PinkPantheress	United Kingdom
154	Bad Dreams	Fool Nelson	Australia
155	Berghain	Rosalía, Björk and Yves Tumor	Spain/Iceland/United States
156	Never Enough	Turnstile	United States
157	Pirate Radio	Genesis Owusu	Australia
158	Bawuypawuy	Drifting Clouds	Australia
159	Raindance	Dave featuring Tems	United Kingdom/Nigeria
160	This Is the Killer Speaking	The Last Dinner Party	United Kingdom
161	The Recap	Kneecap featuring Mozey	United Kingdom
162	Everything Ends	Architects	United Kingdom
163	Henry, Come On	Lana Del Rey	United States
164	Stay the Night	The Dreggs	Australia
165	Sway (Like a Version)	Beabadoobee	United Kingdom
166	Hideaway	Mallrat	Australia
167	Maybe I'm Just a Freak	The Rions	Australia
168	Stay Free	The Terrys	Australia
169	Clothes Off	Aleksiah	Australia
170	Coast Is Clear	Ball Park Music	Australia
171	Top of the Hill	South Summit	Australia
172	Racer	Blusher	Australia
173	Stay with Me	X Club	Australia
174	Nobody's Girl	Tate McRae	Canada
175	Peacekeeper	Baker Boy	Australia
176	Catch These Fists	Wet Leg	United Kingdom
177	Itty Bitty	Ashnikko	United States
178	This Is It	The Smith Street Band	Australia
179	Fuck Me Eyes	Ethel Cain	United States
180	Cruising to Self Soothe	Ecca Vandal	Australia
181	Nuevayol	Bad Bunny	United States
182	Tonight	PinkPantheress	United Kingdom
183	Cops & Robbers	Sammy Virji and Skepta	United Kingdom
184	Holiday (Like a Version)	The Amity Affliction	Australia
185	Giving Up Air	The Temper Trap	Australia
186	All Hat No Cattle	Hockey Dad	Australia
187	Backstreets	Miss Kaninna	Australia
188	Hide and Seek (Like a Version)	Ball Park Music	Australia
189	High Fashion	Addison Rae	United States
190	Post Sex Clarity	Lola Young	United Kingdom
191	He Said No	Meg Mac	Australia
192	Angel of Mine	Tobiahs	Australia
193	Chanel	Tyla	South Africa
194	I Don't Wanna Go Home	Kita Alexander	Australia
195	Back to Me	The Marías	United States
196	The Right	DJ Seinfeld and Confidence Man	Sweden/Australia
197	We Never Dated	Sombr	United States
198	Bitch	The Buoys	Australia
199	Life in Love	Ocean Alley	Australia
200	Bing Bong	Bbno$ and Vnlla	Canada/United States

== Statistics ==
=== Artists with multiple entries ===
#	Artist	Entries
5	Olivia Dean	1, 7, 11, 14, 62
5	Spacey Jane	6, 25, 31, 39, 42
4	Tame Impala	3, 28, 36, 40
4	Ocean Alley	17, 43, 44, 87
4	Royel Otis	21, 34, 35, 54
4	Ninajirachi	27, 47, 76, 99
3	Keli Holiday	2, 41, 96
3	Sombr	8, 18, 19
3	Fred Again	12, 33, 51
3	G Flip	23, 50, 74
3	Tate McRae	26, 45, 52
3	Djo	30, 66, 100
3	Hilltop Hoods	67, 85, 86
2	Playlunch	4, 73
2	Sam Fender	14, 79
2	Chappell Roan	15, 37
2	Addison Rae	20, 65
2	Lorde	22, 71
2	Fisher	32, 89
2	Lily Allen	38, 88
2	Kettama	46, 48
2	Lola Young	57, 60
2	The Rions	69, 90
2	The Dreggs	70, 91
2	Old Mervs	83, 98

=== Countries represented ===
Nation	Total
Australia	54
United Kingdom	21
United States	20
Canada	4
Ireland	4
New Zealand	4
Iceland	1

=== Records ===
- Hilltop Hoods' three entries meant that the Adelaide group set a new record for most appearances in the Hottest 100, with 28. This marked the fifteenth annual countdown in which Hilltop Hoods appeared.
- Adam Hyde came second for the second time, after previously finishing second with Peking Duk in 2014. Hyde is the second artist to achieve this feat after Ben Lee came second in 1998 and 2005.
- Lily Allen made her first appearances in the countdown since 2009, ending a sixteen year absence. Similarly, Tinashe ended a ten year absence after Disco Lines' remix of "No Broke Boys" charted at No. 9.
- Fred Again placed twelfth for the third consecutive year.
- Fisher, G Flip and Lime Cordiale made their eighth consecutive appearance in the Hottest 100, having featured in every annual countdown since 2018. In doing so, ties them for the second longest consecutive streak alongside Billie Eilish who charted from 2017 to 2024. Eilish's absence from the 2025 countdown, meant that the American singer-songwriter failed to appear in the Hottest 100 for the first time since 2016.
  - Spacey Jane made their seventh consecutive appearance, having featured since 2019.
  - The Kid Laroi made his sixth consecutive appearance, having featured since 2020
  - Dom Dolla and The Rions made their fifth consecutive appearance, having featured since 2021
- Bad Bunny is the first artist from Puerto Rico to appear in the countdown. Similarly, Laufey was the first artist from Iceland to appear in the Hottest 100 in eleven years.
- The song "Somebody That I Used to Know", which topped the 2011 list, featured in the countdown for a second time after it was sampled in the song "Anxiety" by Doechii, which charted at No. 29. "Khe Sanh" also featured for a second time after a cover by Beddy Rays charted at No. 49; the original previously appeared in the 1989, 1998 (All Time) and the Hottest 100 of Australian Songs at No. 95, No. 94 and No. 8 respectively.
