= Dracula (song) =

2025 single by Tame Impala

Single by Tame Impala

from the album Deadbeat
- Released: 26 September 2025
- Recorded: 2021–2025
- Studio: Kevin Parker's home studio (Fremantle); Wave House (Injidup)
- Genre: Disco; electropop
- Length: 3:25
- Label: Columbia
- Songwriters: Kevin Parker; Sarah Aarons
- Producer: Kevin Parker

Tame Impala singles chronology
"Loser" (2025)	"Dracula" (2025)	"My Old Ways" (2025)

Music video
- "Dracula" on YouTube

"Dracula" is a song by Tame Impala, the musical project of Australian multi-instrumentalist Kevin Parker. It was released on 26 September 2025 as the third single from the project's fifth studio album, Deadbeat (2025). A disco and electropop song about finding solace in darkness, "Dracula" was produced by Parker and co-written by him and Sarah Aarons.

"Dracula" was met with a polarised response from critics, who praised its catchy pop sound while criticising its lyrics. It became the first Tame Impala song to chart on the US Billboard Hot 100. Julian Klincewicz directed the song's music video, which visually referenced Western Australia's rave and bush doof culture and received a nomination for the Audience Choice Award for Favourite Australian Music Video at the 15th AACTA Awards. At the 2026 ARIA Music Awards, it was nominated for Best Pop Release and Song of the Year, winning both awards.

A remix of "Dracula" with South Korean singer Jennie was released on 6 February 2026, which was received positively by critics and spawned a viral trend on video-sharing app TikTok. The remix peaked at number two on the Billboard Global 200, becoming Tame Impala's first and Jennie's fifth top-ten hit, and number three on the Billboard Hot 100, earning both artists their first top-ten hit. Following the release of the remix, the song experienced a surge in popularity and reached new peaks worldwide, topping the chart in Belgium (Wallonia), Germany, MENA, Switzerland and the United Arab Emirates, and entering the top ten in Australia, Austria, Canada, Croatia, France, Greece, Ireland, Lithuania, New Zealand, Singapore, Saudi Arabia, Sweden and the United Kingdom. The remix received two nominations at the 69th Annual Grammy Awards for Record of the Year and Best Pop Duo/Group Performance.

== Background and release ==
On 25 July 2025, Tame Impala released "End of Summer" as their first single under Columbia Records, followed by the single "Loser" on 3 September. On 4 September, the project announced their fifth studio album, Deadbeat, due for release via Columbia Records on 17 October 2025. The following day, Tame Impala announced dates for a United States tour to support the album starting October.

On 18 September, Tame Impala revealed the tracklist of Deadbeat, featuring previously released singles "End of Summer" and "Loser" as well as "Dracula" as the third track, and included a snippet of the unreleased song as the post's audio. "Dracula" was issued on 26 September as the album's third single, alongside an announcement for the UK and Europe dates of the Deadbeat Tour.

== Recording and composition ==
Kevin Parker is credited as the song's producer, while the song was co-written by Sarah Aarons, making this the first Tame Impala single with a co-writer since "Elephant" and one of three Tame Impala songs on Deadbeat with a co-writer, along with "Afterthought" and "Oblivion". The song began as a simple demo early in the Deadbeat sessions and was developed through successive studio passes into a tighter, more concise arrangement. In an interview on Apple Music 1's Zane Lowe show, Parker described "Dracula" as one of the earliest pieces started for the album, noting it evolved from a raw, minimal sketch into a fuller, pop-leaning track. A disco and electropop track, it has been described as marrying a pulsing, dance-forward beat with Tame Impala's trademark psychedelic textures: layered synths, vocals with reverb, and a propulsive low-end. The production was described as being intentionally nocturnal and club-oriented to reflect the album's rave and bush doof inspirations. Lyrically, the song positions Parker as a recluse who finds solace in darkness, comparing himself to the titular vampire Count Dracula.

== Music video ==
A music video for "Dracula" was released alongside the single and directed by Julian Klincewicz. In the video, nighttime partiers dance outside of a portable house moved by a smoke-belching semi truck as Parker walks in and out of the scene looking resigned. Several media outlets noted the video's nighttime party and outback setting and visual references to Western Australia's rave and bush doof culture—imagery that matches with the album's broader promotional aesthetic.

== Critical reception ==
"Dracula" received a polarised critical response, with reviewers divided over its pop appeal and lyrical substance. Some critics identified it as a highlight of the album, with Neil Z. Yeung of AllMusic calling it "the immediate standout" and praising its "sleek, radio-friendly" sound. KTLA reporter Russell Falcon named it one of the year's best pop songs, while Rolling Stone's Jon Dolan described it as a "sleek synth-bop". The track's disco-laden production garnered comparisons to Michael Jackson's "Thriller" as well as Tame Impala's work on Dua Lipa's Radical Optimism. Favorable reviews from Consequence and New Noise Magazine noted its groove-driven style and self-aware humor, with the former's Paolo Ragusa suggesting that its more exaggerated lyrics such as "Now I’m Mr. Charisma, fuckin' Pablo Escobar" contributed to its playful appeal.

On the other hand, other critics like Clash's Karan Singh pointed to the same line as an example of the song's weaker songwriting and derided it as the album's worst track. Will Hodgkinson of The Times and Charles Lyon-Bunt of Slant Magazine concurred with Singh's low ranking of the song, citing its perceived lack of depth and repetitiveness. Pitchfork's Sam Goldner acknowledged the song's catchiness but found it ultimately insubstantial. Similarly, Ross Horton MusicOMH noted the song's "undeniable groove" but found fault with its "hammy" lyrics. Ed Power negatively characterised the song for The Irish Times as a "vapid piece of psychedelic fizz".

== Awards ==
"Dracula" placed third on Triple J's Hottest 100 of 2025, behind "Man I Need" by Olivia Dean and "Dancing2" by Keli Holiday, becoming Tame Impala's 19th appearance on the annual list since 2012, and their seventh appearance in the top ten.

Awards and nominations
Year	Organisation	Award	Result	Ref.
2026	AACTA Awards	Favourite Australian Music Video	Nominated	
2026	American Music Awards	Best Rock/Alternative Song	Nominated	
2026	ARIA Music Awards	Best Pop Release	Won	
2026	ARIA Music Awards	Song of the Year	Won	
2026	MTV Video Music Awards	Best Alternative	Nominated	

== Commercial performance ==
"Dracula" was the first Tame Impala song to chart on the US Billboard Hot 100, debuting at number 55 with 6.5 million streams, 1.7 million radio audience impressions and 1,000 sold in its first week of release. The song also debuted at number seven and eight respectively on the Hot Alternative Songs and Hot Rock & Alternative Songs charts. It became the first song from Deadbeat to enter a radio chart, debuting at number 23 on Rock & Alternative Airplay and number 31 on Alternative Airplay. Following the release of Deadbeat, "Dracula" debuted at number one on the Hot Dance/Electronic Songs chart dated 1 November 2025 becoming the project's first number-one, and rose from number seven to its peak at number three on the Hot Rock & Alternative Songs chart. On the all-genre Billboard Hot 100, "Dracula" entered the top 40 for the first time in the same week, rising from number 59 to 33. The song saw an increase in streams on Halloween, achieving over 1.8 million on-demand U.S. streams, up 49% from the previous Friday. The song subsequently reached a new peak at number 3 on the Hot 100 in November and also remained at number one on the Hot Dance/Electronic Songs chart for five weeks. On the chart dated 7 February 2026, "Dracula" topped the Alternative Airplay chart, becoming Tame Impala's second number-one after "Neverender" with Justice in 2025.

== Credits ==
Credits adapted from the liner notes of Deadbeat.

Recording

- Recorded and mixed at Kevin Parker's home studio (Fremantle, Western Australia) and Wave House (Injidup, Western Australia)
- Additional recording at Diamond Mine (New York City)
- Mastered at Metropolis Mastering (London)

Personnel

- Kevin Parker – vocals, songwriter, producer, mix engineer, recording engineer
- Sarah Aarons – songwriter
- Loren Humphrey – additional production, recording engineer
- Matt Colton – mastering engineer

== Charts ==
=== Weekly charts ===
Weekly chart performance
Chart (2025–2026)	Peak position
Argentina Anglo Airplay (Monitor Latino)	15
Australia (ARIA)	4
Australia Airplay (RCS)	7
Austria (Ö3 Austria Top 40)	2
Austria Airplay (MusicTrace)	28
Belgium (Ultratop 50 Flanders)	26
Belgium (Ultratop 50 Wallonia)	1
Bolivia Anglo Airplay (Monitor Latino)	3
Brazil Airplay (Crowley)	106
Canada Hot 100 (Billboard)	13
Canada Hot AC (Billboard)	35
Canada Modern Rock (Billboard Canada)	19
Colombia Anglo Airplay (Monitor Latino)	7
CIS Airplay (TopHit)	28
Costa Rica Anglo Airplay (Monitor Latino)	6
Croatia (Billboard)	8
Croatia International Airplay (Top lista)	10
Czech Republic Singles Digital (ČNS IFPI)	29
Denmark (Tracklisten)	26
Denmark Airplay (Tracklisten)	18
Dominican Republic Anglo Airplay (Monitor Latino)	8
Ecuador Anglo Airplay (Monitor Latino)	10
Estonia Airplay (TopHit)	74
Finland Airplay (Radiosoittolista)	24
France (SNEP)	138
France Airplay (SNEP)	2
Germany (GfK)	1
Germany Airplay (MusicTrace)	19
Global 200 (Billboard)	35
Greece International (IFPI)	7
Greece Airplay (IFPI)	4
Guatemala Anglo Airplay (Monitor Latino)	8
Honduras Anglo Airplay (Monitor Latino)	2
Hungary (Rádiós Top 40)	24
Hungary (Single Top 40)	10
Iceland (Tónlistinn)	24
Ireland (IRMA)	3
Italy (FIMI)	45
Italy Airplay (EarOne)	2
Japan Hot Overseas (Billboard Japan)	19
Kazakhstan Airplay (TopHit)	8
Latvia Airplay (LaIPA)	5
Lebanon (Lebanese Top 20)	2
Lithuania (AGATA)	6
Luxembourg (Billboard)	12
Malaysia (IFPI)	12
Malaysia International (RIM)	5
Malta Airplay (Radiomonitor)	4
Mexico Anglo Airplay (Monitor Latino)	10
Middle East and North Africa (IFPI)	1
Moldova Airplay (TopHit)	7
Netherlands (Dutch Top 40)	15
Netherlands (Single Top 100)	9
New Zealand (Recorded Music NZ)	9
Nigeria Airplay (TurnTable)	96
North Macedonia Airplay (Radiomonitor)	3
Norway (VG-lista)	27
Norway Airplay (IFPI)	35
Paraguay Anglo Airplay (Monitor Latino)	8
Peru Anglo Airplay (Monitor Latino)	12
Philippines Hot 100 (Billboard Philippines)	41
Poland Airplay (OLiS)	5
Poland Streaming (OLiS)	5
Portugal (AFP)	5
Romania (Billboard)	11
Russia Airplay (TopHit)	47
Russia Streaming (TopHit)	86
San Marino Airplay (SMRTV Top 50)	2
Saudi Arabia (IFPI)	5
Serbia Airplay (Radiomonitor)	1
Singapore (RIAS)	3
Slovakia Airplay (ČNS IFPI)	5
Slovakia Singles Digital (ČNS IFPI)	19
Slovenia Airplay (Radiomonitor)	8
Spain (Promusicae)	64
Spain Airplay (Promusicae)	4
Sweden (Sverigetopplistan)	5
Switzerland (Schweizer Hitparade)	1
Switzerland Airplay (MusicTrace)	8
Turkey International Airplay (Radiomonitor Türkiye)	5
Ukraine Airplay (TopHit)	20
United Arab Emirates (IFPI)	1
UK Singles (OCC) (Note: The UK Singles Chart combines sales and streams from all versions of a song into one entry under the original track.)	2
US Billboard Hot 100	24
US Adult Pop Airplay (Billboard)	11
US Hot Dance/Electronic Songs (Billboard)	1
US Hot Rock & Alternative Songs (Billboard)	1
US Pop Airplay (Billboard)	1
US Rock & Alternative Airplay (Billboard)	1
Venezuela Anglo Airplay (Monitor Latino)	15
Vietnam Hot 100 (Billboard)	66

=== Monthly charts ===
Monthly chart performance
Chart (2025–2026)	Peak position
CIS Airplay (TopHit)	35
Estonia Airplay (TopHit)	74
Kazakhstan Airplay (TopHit)	24
Lithuania Airplay (TopHit)	25
Moldova Airplay (TopHit)	11
Paraguay Airplay (SGP)	75
Romania Airplay (TopHit)	70
Russia Airplay (TopHit)	53
Ukraine Airplay (TopHit)	74

=== Year-end charts ===
Year-end chart performance
Chart (2025)	Position
Australian Artist Singles (ARIA)	34
Netherlands (Dutch Top 40)	77

== Certifications ==
Certifications
Region	Certification	Certified units/sales
Australia (ARIA)	4× Platinum	280,000^{‡}
Austria (IFPI Austria)	Platinum	30,000^{‡}
Belgium (BRMA)	Platinum	40,000^{‡}
Canada (Music Canada)	2× Platinum	160,000^{‡}
Denmark (IFPI Danmark)	Gold	45,000^{‡}
France (SNEP)	Diamond	333,333^{‡}
Germany (BVMI)	Gold	300,000^{‡}
Hungary (MAHASZ)	4× Platinum	16,000^{‡}
Italy (FIMI)	Gold	100,000^{‡}
Mexico (AMPROFON)	Platinum	140,000^{‡}
Netherlands (NVPI)	Gold	46,500^{‡}
New Zealand (RMNZ)	Platinum	30,000^{‡}
Poland (ZPAV)	Platinum	125,000^{‡}
Portugal (AFP)	2× Platinum	50,000^{‡}
Spain (Promusicae)	Gold	50,000^{‡}
Switzerland (IFPI Switzerland)	Gold	15,000^{‡}
United Kingdom (BPI)	Platinum	600,000^{‡}
Streaming
Greece (IFPI Greece)	Platinum	2,000,000^{†}
Slovakia (ČNS IFPI)	Gold	850,000^{†}
Sweden (GLF)	Gold	6,000,000^{†}
^{‡} Sales+streaming figures based on certification alone.^{†} Streaming-only figures based on certification alone.

== Release history ==
Release history
Region	Date	Format	Label	Ref.
Various	26 September 2025	Digital download; streaming	Columbia	
United States	12 November 2025	Contemporary hit radio	Columbia	

== Jennie remix ==
"Dracula"
- Digital cover

Single by Tame Impala and Jennie
- Released: 6 February 2026
- Studio: Kevin Parker's home studio (Fremantle); Wave House (Injidup); Ingrid (Seoul)
- Genre: Disco; electropop
- Length: 3:29
- Label: Columbia
- Songwriters: Kevin Parker; Sarah Aarons; Jennie; Carly Gibert
- Producer: Kevin Parker

Tame Impala singles chronology
"My Old Ways" (2025)	"Dracula" (2026)	"Hummer" (2026)

Jennie singles chronology
"Handlebars" (2025)	"Dracula" (with Jennie) (2026)	"Less Than a Lover" (2026)

Lyric video
- "Dracula" (Jennie remix) on YouTube

A remix of "Dracula" with South Korean singer and rapper Jennie was released as a single on 6 February 2026. It was co-written by Kevin Parker and Jennie with Sarah Aarons and Carly Gibert, and produced by Parker. Upon release, it produced a viral trend on video-sharing app TikTok and caused the song to surge in popularity. Commercially, the remix peaked at number two on the Billboard Global 200, becoming Tame Impala's first and Jennie's fifth top-ten hit. In the United States, the remix peaked at number three on the Billboard Hot 100, earning both artists their first top-ten hit, and was certified platinum by the Recording Industry Association of America (RIAA). It also entered the top ten in countries such as Canada, Croatia, the Czech Republic, France, Greece, Iceland, Latvia, Lithuania, Luxembourg, Romania, Slovakia and Ukraine, and the top fifteen in Hong Kong and Norway. The remix received two nominations at the 69th Annual Grammy Awards for Record of the Year and Best Pop Duo/Group Performance.

=== Background and release ===
In 2026, Tame Impala began teasing the collaboration by editing the "Dracula" music video description on YouTube to replace Kevin Parker's name with Jennie's in the line "My friends are saying 'shut up Kevin just get in the car'". He was also photographed wearing official Jennie merchandise, adding to the rumours. Parker officially announced the "Dracula" remix with Jennie on 3 February with an Instagram video of himself in the studio cranking the volume up on a fader labeled with her name, revealing her voice on the track. The remix was officially released on 6 February 2026.

=== Recording and composition ===
The remix version of "Dracula" contains additional songwriting credits from Jennie and Carly Gibert, alongside the initial credits from Kevin Parker and Sarah Aarons. The instrumental arrangement is similar; it introduces Jennie's "soft, captivating vocal style" halfway through. She layers her vocals over several verses and the chorus and adds a new rap verse, starting with "Hey, Kevin, what's up? / Come pull up in my spot / Let's keep the night glowing, I don't ever wanna stop." Some of the original lyrics are tweaked, such as using "My friends are saying, 'Shut up, Jennie, just get in the car'" instead of "Shut up, Kevin".

=== Critical reception ===
Billboard ranked the remix 15th on its midyear list of the best songs of 2026. Writer Lyndsey Havens described Jennie's role on the remix as a "quiet, creeping force" and praised her continuous presence throughout the song rather than a brief guest appearance. She argued that Jennie's contribution gave the song a more intimate and conversational tone and broadened its appeal, which helped the remix "eclipse the original". Writing for Rolling Stone India, Debashree Dutta named the remix one of the top 10 K-pop songs of the year and praised Jennie's "cool low register" for giving the mix an "extra edge".

=== Awards ===
Awards and nominations
Year	Organisation	Award	Result	Ref.
2026	American Music Awards	Song of the Summer	Nominated	
2026	BreakTudo Awards	International Hit of the Year	Pending	
2026	Los 40 Music Awards	Best International Song	Pending	
2026	MTV Video Music Awards	Song of Summer	Nominated	
2026	Nickelodeon Kids' Choice Awards	Favorite Music Collaboration	Won	
2026	NRJ Music Awards	International Collaboration of the Year	Nominated	
2026	SEC Awards	International Feat of the Year	Nominated	
2027	Grammy Awards	Best Pop Duo/Group Performance	Pending	
2027	Grammy Awards	Record of the Year	Pending	

=== Commercial performance ===
The remix was a commercial success and inspired a viral TikTok trend, which Jennie joined during Paris Fashion Week. The trend amassed 545,000 videos as of April and was joined by celebrities such as Bryan Cranston, the Pussycat Dolls, Lisa Rinna and Harry Hamlin, Laufey, Eric Winter, the Wiggles, Emma Chamberlain, Meghan Trainor, Charli D'Amelio, and even Tame Impala and Jennie themselves. The remix and its accompanying TikTok trend helped "Dracula" surge on the US Billboard Hot 100 chart. On the week of 2 May, the remix reached number one on the Hot Rock & Alternative Songs chart, becoming both artists' first chart-topper, as well as number one on the Hot Rock Songs and Hot Alternative Songs charts. It achieved this with 12 million streams, 15.2 million in radio airplay audience impressions and 2,000 sales during the week of 17–23 April. On 16 May, the remix entered the top ten of the Billboard Hot 100 for the first time, with 12.1 million streams (up 5%), 23.1 million in radio audience (up 20%) and 2,000 sold (up 25%). The song became the first top-ten hit for both Tame Impala and Jennie, making Jennie the second Blackpink member to enter the top ten after Rosé. The achievement also made Blackpink the fourth all-female group to have multiple members reach the top ten solo, after Destiny's Child, Fifth Harmony, and the Go-Go's, and the fifth group overall to have multiple women do so including Fleetwood Mac. The remix entered the top five on the Hot 100 dated 18 July.

In the tracking week with Halloween, the remix peaked at number three on the Billboard Hot 100, with a 31% rise to 9.4 million streams and 8% to 2,000 sold. With this, "Dracula" surpassed Glass Animals' "Heat Waves" for the longest journey to the top three by total chart weeks, taking 58 weeks. Jennie also tied her bandmate Rosé for the highest Hot 100 rank by a female K-pop artist. The remix spent over 16 weeks in the top 10 of the chart, surpassing BTS' "Butter" as the longest-charting song by a K-pop artist in the top 10. It also reached number one on the Pop Airplay chart, marking both artists' first chart-topper and making Jennie the second Blackpink member to reach number one after Rosé. Blackpink consequently became the third girl group with multiple members to top the chart solo, after Destiny’s Child and Fifth Harmony, and the fourth group overall including One Direction. "Dracula" additionally reached number one on the Radio Songs chart with 62.6 million in airplay audience, becoming both artists' first leader on the chart. The remix spent a second week at its peak at number three on the Hot 100, simultaneously spending its 45th week atop Hot Dance/Electronic Songs, 26th atop Hot Rock & Alternative Songs, and ninth atop Radio Songs.

On the Billboard Global 200 chart dated 11 April 2026, the remix rose from number 16 to a new peak at number 4 with 42 million streams (up 10%) and 3,000 sold (up 22%) worldwide. With this, Tame Impala earned their first top 10 on the chart while Jennie earned her fifth as a soloist, not including the five she earned as a member of Blackpink. On the Billboard Global Excl. US for the same week, the remix rose from 17 to a new peak at number 4, becoming Tame Impala's first top 10 and Jennie's sixth as a soloist, surpassing her group Blackpink's five. The following week, it reached new peaks at number 3 on the Billboard Global 200 and number 2 on the Global Excl. US. On the next week dated 25 April, the remix peaked at number 2 on the Billboard Global 200.

=== Live performances ===
Jennie made her debut live performance of "Dracula" at the ComplexCon Hong Kong festival on 22 March 2026. She performed the remix during her headlining performances at the Governors Ball Music Festival on 7 June, Roskilde Festival on 3 July, Open'er Festival on 4 July, Mad Cool on 10 July, and Lollapalooza on 1 August. On 29 July, Jennie joined Tame Impala onstage at the Deadbeat Tour in Boston to perform "Dracula", the first time the artists performed the song together.

=== Track listing ===
Digital download and streaming – remix

1. "Dracula" (with Jennie) – 3:29
2. "Dracula" – 3:25

Digital download and streaming – remix + instrumental

1. "Dracula" (with Jennie) – 3:29
2. "Dracula" – 3:25
3. "Dracula" (with Jennie; instrumental) – 3:29

CD single

1. "Dracula" (with Jennie) – 3:29
2. "Dracula" (with Jennie; instrumental) – 3:29

Digital download and streaming – Boys Noize Disko version

1. "Dracula" (with Jennie; Boys Noize Disko version) – 4:01

=== Credits ===
Credits adapted from the liner notes of the CD single.

Recording

- Recorded and mixed at Kevin Parker's home studio (Fremantle, Western Australia), Wave House (Injidup, Western Australia), and Ingrid Studio (Seoul, South Korea)
- Additional recording at Diamond Mine (New York City)
- Mixed at Hercules Street Studios (Sydney, Australia)
- Mastered at Metropolis Mastering (London)

Personnel

- Kevin Parker – vocals, songwriter, producer, mix engineer, recording engineer
- Jennie – vocals, songwriter, remixer
- Sarah Aarons – songwriter
- Carly Gibert – songwriter
- Loren Humphrey – additional production, recording engineer
- Eric J Dubowsky – mix engineer
- Mendy Stein – assistant mix engineer
- Jung Eun-kyung – recording engineer
- Matt Colton – mastering engineer

=== Charts ===
==== Weekly charts ====
Weekly chart performance
Chart (2026)	Peak position
Belarus Airplay (TopHit)	26
Brazil Hot 100 (Billboard)	64
Bulgaria Airplay (PROPHON)	2
Canada Hot 100 (Billboard)	2
Canada AC (Billboard)	2
Canada CHR/Top 40 (Billboard)	4
Canada Hot AC (Billboard)	1
Canada Modern Rock (Billboard Canada)	15
Central America Anglo Airplay (Monitor Latino)	12
CIS Airplay (TopHit)	9
Costa Rica Anglo Airplay (Monitor Latino)	8
Croatia (Billboard)	5
Croatia International Airplay (Top lista)	16
Czech Republic Singles Digital (ČNS IFPI)	7
Dominican Republic Anglo Airplay (Monitor Latino)	5
El Salvador Anglo Airplay (Monitor Latino)	2
Estonia Airplay (TopHit)	19
Estonia Airplay (TopHit) Boys Noize Disko version	49
Finland (Suomen virallinen lista)	22
France (SNEP)	5
France Airplay (SNEP)	1
Global 200 (Billboard)	2
Greece International (IFPI)	2
Honduras Anglo Airplay (Monitor Latino)	1
Hong Kong (Billboard)	14
Hungary (Billboard)	4
Iceland (Billboard)	9
Israel (Mako Hitlist)	49
Latin America Anglo Airplay (Monitor Latino)	19
Latvia Airplay (TopHit)	175
Latvia Streaming (LaIPA)	3
Lithuania (AGATA)	4
Lithuania Airplay (TopHit) Boys Noize Disko version	67
Luxembourg (Billboard)	2
Malaysia (Billboard)	8
Mexico Anglo Airplay (Monitor Latino)	8
Moldova Airplay (TopHit)	1
New Zealand Hot Singles (RMNZ)	7
Norway (VG-lista)	14
Peru Anglo Airplay (Monitor Latino)	6
Poland (Billboard)	4
Puerto Rico Anglo Airplay (Monitor Latino)	1
Romania (Billboard)	9
Russia Airplay (TopHit)	13
Singapore (Billboard)	3
Slovakia Airplay (ČNS IFPI)	46
Slovakia Singles Digital (ČNS IFPI)	2
South Africa (Billboard)	5
South Korea Download (Circle)	117
Suriname (Nationale Top 40)	4
Ukraine Airplay (TopHit)	4
UK (Billboard)	3
US Billboard Hot 100	3
US Adult Contemporary (Billboard)	13
US Adult Pop Airplay (Billboard)	1
US Hot Dance/Electronic Songs (Billboard)	1
US Hot Rock & Alternative Songs (Billboard)	1
US Pop Airplay (Billboard)	1
Venezuela Airplay (Record Report)	27

==== Monthly charts ====
Monthly chart performance
Chart (2026)	Peak position
Belarus Airplay (TopHit)	51
CIS Airplay (TopHit)	8
Estonia Airplay (TopHit)	28
Estonia Airplay (TopHit) Boys Noize Disko version	65
Lithuania Airplay (TopHit)	25
Moldova Airplay (TopHit)	1
Russia Airplay (TopHit)	15
Ukraine Airplay (TopHit)	13

=== Certifications ===
Certifications
Region	Certification	Certified units/sales
United States (RIAA)	Platinum	1,000,000^{‡}
Streaming
Greece (IFPI Greece)	Platinum	2,000,000^{†}
Slovakia (ČNS IFPI)	Gold	850,000^{†}
^{‡} Sales+streaming figures based on certification alone.^{†} Streaming-only figures based on certification alone.

=== Release history ===
Release history
Region	Date	Format	Version	Label	Ref.
Various	6 February 2026	Digital download; streaming	Remix	Columbia	
United States	10 February 2026	Contemporary hit radio	Remix	Columbia	
Various	1 May 2026	Digital download; streaming	Remix instrumental	Columbia	
Europe	May 2026	CD single	Remix; remix instrumental	Columbia	
Various	12 May 2026	Digital download; streaming	Boys Noize Disko version	Columbia	

== See also ==
- List of Billboard Adult Top 40 number-one songs of the 2020s
- List of Billboard Global 200 top-ten singles in 2026
- List of Billboard Hot 100 top-ten singles in 2026
- List of Billboard number-one dance songs of 2025
- List of Billboard number-one dance songs of 2026
- List of Billboard Pop Airplay number-one songs of 2026
- List of number-one Australian Artist singles of 2025 (Australia)
- List of number-one Australian Artist singles of 2026 (Australia)
- List of number-one hits of 2026 (Germany)
- List of number-one hits of 2026 (Switzerland)
- List of Radio Songs number ones of the 2020s
- List of top 10 singles for 2026 in Australia
- List of top 10 singles in 2026 (France)
- List of top 10 singles in 2026 (Ireland)
- List of UK top-ten singles in 2026
- List of Ultratop 50 number-one singles of 2026
