= List of top 10 singles for 2026 in Australia =

This is a list of songs that charted in the top ten of the ARIA Charts in 2026. Since the week of 8 September 2025, the ARIA Charts only allow songs within two years of release to appear on the ARIA Top 50 singles chart.

== Top-ten singles ==
An asterisk (*) represents that a single is in the top ten as of the issue dated 23 November 2026.

Key

Symbol	Meaning
◁	Indicates single's top 10 entry was also its ARIA top 50 debut

List of ARIA top ten singles that peaked in 2026
Top ten entry date	Single	Artist(s)	Peak	Peak date	Weeks in top ten	Refs.
Singles from 2012
31 December	"Beauty and a Beat"	Justin Bieber featuring Nicki Minaj	5	27 April	6	
Singles from 2025
27 October	"So Easy (To Fall in Love)"	Olivia Dean	2	9 February	33	
10 November	"Where Is My Husband!"	Raye	3	26 January	24	
Singles from 2026
19 January	"Raindance"	Dave and Tems	8	26 January	11	
26 January	"I Just Might"	Bruno Mars	8	9 March	2	
2 February	"Aperture"◁	Harry Styles	2	2 February	2	
16 February	"DtMF"	Bad Bunny	4	16 February	2	
23 February	"Rein Me In"	Sam Fender and Olivia Dean	1	6 April	40*	
23 February	"Homewrecker"	Sombr	6	2 March	3	
9 March	"Stateside"	PinkPantheress with Zara Larsson	3	9 March	7	
9 March	"Iloveitiloveitiloveit"	Bella Kay	3	23 March	16	
16 March	"American Girls"	Harry Styles	3	16 March	2	
23 March	"Dracula"	Tame Impala	4	6 April	19	
30 March	"Swim"◁	BTS	4	30 March	1	
6 April	"Choosin' Texas"	Ella Langley	1	18 May	34*	
27 April	"Drop Dead"◁	Olivia Rodrigo	1	27 April	10	
25 May	"National Treasures"◁	Drake	4	25 May	2	
25 May	"Janice STFU"◁	Drake	5	25 May	4	
25 May	"Whisper My Name"◁	Drake	6	25 May	1	
25 May	"Make Them Cry"◁	Drake	9	25 May	1	
25 May	"Dust"◁	Drake	10	25 May	1	
1 June	"The Cure"◁	Olivia Rodrigo	1	1 June	18	
8 June	"Hate that I Made You Love Me"◁	Ariana Grande	2	8 June	11	
8 June	"Earrings"	Malcolm Todd	7	27 July	15	
15 June	"I Knew It, I Knew You"◁	Taylor Swift	1	15 June	3	
22 June	"Stupid Song"◁	Olivia Rodrigo	1	22 June	19*	
22 June	"Honeybee"◁	Olivia Rodrigo	7	22 June	2	
22 June	"Maggots for Brains"◁	Olivia Rodrigo	9	22 June	1	
22 June	"Begged"◁	Olivia Rodrigo	10	22 June	1	
3 August	"Animal"◁	Katseye	1	24 August	3	
3 August	"Dai Dai"	Shakira and Burna Boy	10	3 August	1	
10 August	"Petal"◁	Ariana Grande	5	10 August	2	
17 August	"Boston"	Stella Lefty	4	31 August	14*	
24 August	"Loser"	Tame Impala	7	24 August	5	
31 August	"Self Aware"	Temper City	10	31 August	4	
28 September	"Nicole Kidman"	Adéla	3	2 November	9*	
28 September	"Ain't in LA"	Adéla	7	28 September	2	
5 October	"Patient Zero"◁	Taylor Swift	1	5 October	4	
5 October	"Cleveland!"◁	Taylor Swift	3	5 October	1	
5 October	"Babylon"◁	Taylor Swift	4	5 October	1	
5 October	"Pink Clouding"◁	Taylor Swift	5	5 October	1	
19 October	"Stop the Wedding!"	Ashe	5	23 November	6*	
26 October	"Housewife"◁	Tate McRae	1	26 October	5*	
26 October	"Expectations"	Olivia Rodrigo	2	26 October	3	
2 November	"Lies"	Zach Bryan featuring Lana Del Rey	8	2 November	1	
2 November	"Babydoll"	Jamie Miller	1	23 November	4*	

=== 2024 peaks ===
List of ARIA top ten singles in 2026 that peaked in 2024
Top ten entry date	Single	Artist(s)	Peak	Peak date	Weeks in top ten	References
11 March	"End of Beginning"	Djo	3	18 March	12	

=== 2025 peaks ===
List of ARIA top ten singles in 2026 that peaked in 2025
Top ten entry date	Single	Artist(s)	Peak	Peak date	Weeks in top ten	References
24 March	"Ordinary"	Alex Warren	1	31 March	81*	
12 May	"Love Me Not"	Ravyn Lenae	2	7 July	14	
19 May	"Back to Friends"	Sombr	3	26 May	21	
30 June	"No Broke Boys"	Tinashe and Disco Lines	3	25 August	33	
7 July	"Golden"◁	Ejae, Audrey Nuna, and Rei Ami, KPop Demon Hunters	1	4 August	36	
21 July	"Daisies"	Justin Bieber	1	28 July	15	
8 September	"Man I Need"	Olivia Dean	1	24 November	65*	
22 September	"12 to 12"	Sombr	6	22 September	22	
6 October	"Nice to Each Other"	Olivia Dean	8	1 December	9	
13 October	"The Fate of Ophelia"◁	Taylor Swift	1	13 October	24	
13 October	"Opalite"	Taylor Swift	2	13 October	12	

== See also ==
- List of number-one singles of 2026 (Australia)
