= RIP Magic =

London dance-punk band

- Origin: London, England
- Genres: Dance punk; electropunk
- Years active: 2024–present
- Labels: DFA; Partisan; Section1
- Members: Marco Pini; Felix Bayley-Higgins; Beth Boswell-Knight; Pedro Takahashi
- Website: www.hotline.rip

RIP Magic are a dance punk band from London, England.

They were formed by Marco Pini of London indie rock band Sorry and Felix Bayley-Higgins who knew each other from school. Despite having no releases they sold out a string of shows, and were dubbed "London's buzziest buzz band". Tyler, the Creator took an interest in their demos.

They later added Beth Boswell-Knight and Pedro Takahashi to the band. In June 2025, they released their debut single "Loot"/"Dox". They subsequently gained support slots with LCD Soundsystem and Fcukers. This led to work with James Murphy of LCD Soundsystem. He produced the single "5Words", and released a 12" single on his DFA Records label in February 2026.

In spring 2026, the band supported Tame Impala on their European arena tour. The band subsequently signed to Section1 records, an imprint of Partisan Records. Their first releases with them was the single "Screwdark" in May 2026.

In October 2026, they released their debut album, 1,2,3.

== Discography ==
=== Studio albums ===
- 1,2,3 (2026)

=== Singles ===
- "Loot"/"Dox" (2025), self-released
- "5words" (2026), DFA Records
- "Screwdark" (2026), Section1
