= Deadbeat (album) =

Studio album by Tame Impala
- Released: 17 October 2025
- Recorded: 2023–2025
- Studios: Kevin Parker's home studio (Fremantle, Western Australia); Wave House (Injidup, Western Australia)
- Genres: EDM; house; techno; dance-pop; psychedelia
- Length: 56:05
- Label: Columbia
- Producer: Kevin Parker

Tame Impala chronology
The Slow Rush (2020)	Deadbeat (2025)

Singles from Deadbeat
- 1. "End of Summer" Released: 25 July 2025; 2. "Loser" Released: 3 September 2025; 3. "Dracula" Released: 26 September 2025; 4. "My Old Ways" Released: 17 October 2025

Deadbeat is the fifth studio album by Tame Impala, the musical project of Australian multi-instrumentalist Kevin Parker. It was released on 17 October 2025 by Columbia Records, the first Tame Impala release on the label. Musically, Deadbeat was inspired by bush doof culture and the rave scene of Western Australia. The album was preceded by the singles "End of Summer", "Loser" and "Dracula".

At the 2025 J Awards, the album was nominated for Australian Album of the Year. "End of Summer" won the award for Best Dance/Electronic Recording at the 68th Annual Grammy Awards, while the album and its other singles received four Grammy nominations the following year. At the 2026 ARIA Music Awards it was nominated for Album of the Year, Best Alternative Release, Best Solo Artist, Best Engineered Release and Best Produced Release, winning all except Best Alternative Release.

== Background ==
While promoting his previous album, The Slow Rush, in a February 2020 interview, Parker mentioned that the next record would not take as long, saying that he has a "flourish of ideas". In February 2022, he reconfirmed in an interview that he'll have "another Tame Impala album done sooner than what has been the pattern for me". According to Parker, he started working on Deadbeat around 2023. In March 2024, he posted a picture of himself in his recording studio with the caption "don't worry" hinting at his next album. On 13 July 2025, he posted a picture on his Instagram showing a school board with thirteen tracks listed up in a table format.

Head of the album's announcement, Parker completed sessions in Fremantle and at his Wave House studio in Injidup, Western Australia. Statements promoting the album describe it as "deeply inspired by bush doof culture and the Western Australia rave scene."

== Promotion and release ==
Tame Impala formally announced Deadbeat on 4 September 2025, following the release of the album's second single, "Loser", the day before. The album was released worldwide on 17 October 2025 through Columbia Records.

=== Singles ===
On 18 July 2025, an unnamed 12-inch vinyl listing appeared on the Tame Impala webstore for pre-order. The release was later revealed to be the physical edition of "End of Summer" and "Ethereal Connection", issued on 25 July 2025. Parker had first performed the song during a DJ set in Barcelona in early June 2025.

The second single, "Loser", was teased when streaming service metadata for "End of Summer" briefly displayed fields replaced with the title "Loser". Posters advertising a 3 September release date subsequently appeared in several cities, including Los Angeles and New York City. "Loser" was released on 3 September 2025 alongside a music video featuring actor-musician Joe Keery.

The third single, "Dracula", was released on 26 September 2025 following teasers on social media. Parker described the track as one of the defining moments of the Deadbeat era. "Dracula" was written by Parker in collaboration with Sarah Aarons and produced by Parker, with a music video directed by Julian Klincewicz.

The fourth single, "My Old Ways", was teased on social media alongside his music video with a caption that included lyrics of the song, "Powerless as I descend, back into my old ways again". "My Old Ways" was released on 17 October 2025, written and produced by Parker.

== Critical reception ==
Professional ratings
Aggregate scores
Source	Rating
AnyDecentMusic?	6.0/10
Metacritic	64/100
Review scores
Source	Rating
AllMusic	3.5/5 stars
Clash	5/10
Consequence	B−
The Guardian	4/5 stars
The Independent	4/5 stars
The Irish Times	2/5 stars
NME	3/5 stars
Pitchfork	4.8/10
Rolling Stone	3.5/5 stars
The Sydney Morning Herald	3.5/5 stars
The Times	4/5 stars

Deadbeat polarised critics and audiences upon release, receiving both praise and ambivalence leaning towards unfavourability. According to the review aggregator Metacritic, Deadbeat received "generally favorable reviews" based on a weighted average score of 64 out of 100 from 15 critic scores. The review aggregator AnyDecentMusic? gave Deadbeat a weighted average score of 6.0 out of 10 from 18 critic scores.

Writing for The Guardian, Alexis Petridis noted Parker's "preponderance of banging four-four beats", and praised the album's production and experimentation, giving it four out of five stars. Petridis argued some of Parker's songs would have been better as instrumentals, such as "Afterthought", the impact of which "feels reduced by the pop melody he's placed on top of it". He noted thematic pessimism, with the dance and house influence being mirrored in the "unsettled and disrupted tone" of the lyrics. Petridis praised the closing track "End of Summer" as hitting "an enviable sweet spot between dancefloor euphoria and rainwashed sadness", if minimised by its vocal hook. Overall, Petridis praised the "occasionally confused" album as simultaneously "painfully honest" and "genuinely wracked". Other four star reviews came from The Times, The Independent, and New Noise Magazine.

In a 6.5 out of 10 scored review, KTLA reporter Russell Falcon opined the album captured elements of chillwave more than dance, writing that given that artists like Washed Out and, more recently, S.G. Lewis have managed to work within the genre's aesthetic "without sounding anonymous or reserved," Parker's soundscape only "almost works." Falcon highlighted "Piece of Heaven" and "Ethereal Connection" as the album's most successful cuts.

In a 4 out of 5 star review, Bryget Chrisfield of Rolling Stone Australia/New Zealand described Deadbeat as a major stylistic departure from Parker's previous work, writing that the album had a more consistent emotional tone in comparison with previous Tame Impala albums and featured a techno sound rather than a psychedelic sound. Conversely, Thomas Wilde of The Fire Note described Deadbeat as Parker fusing "house, rave, and ambient electronica with [his] melodic psych-pop heart" and that he leaned into "rhythm-driven, club-ready psychedelia" for the album. Mark Chinapen of Medium was conversely more critical of the album in a 5.5 out of 10 scored review, describing the EDM and house of Deadbeat as sounding basic, uninspired and extremely repetitive while considering the album a step down from Parker's prior material. Shaad D'Souza of Resident Advisor additionally noted the repetitive nature of Deadbeat, describing the album as "boilerplate dance-pop" and that it worked best when moving away from its "dance-pop mould".

Goldner of Pitchfork was also critical of the album; he wrote that while Parker had previously been commended for his innovative production and ability to craft immersive "headphone music," Deadbeat marked a steep decline in artistic focus and originality. He described the album as "stale" and "exhausting," claiming that it lacks the sense of craft that had set Tame Impala's earlier work apart. He criticized Parker's exploration of dance music as underdeveloped, stating that he presented "one four-on-the-floor genre after another" without successfully justifying his move into those styles. He wrote that songs such as "Ethereal Connection", "Oblivion" and "Piece of Heaven" felt uninspired, ultimately describing the album as a "daisy-chain of shaky half-measures" and a "sad spectacle".

Karan Singh of Clash too gave the album a negative review, writing that it relies on devout fans who unconditionally believe in Parker despite an "identity crisis" that has left him confused about what to publish under the Tame Impala moniker. He also noted that "the potential obscured by its cumbersome inexactness does occasionally surface, only to vanish right before it amounts to something worth writing home about." He singled out "No Reply", "Oblivion" and "Afterthought" as unsuccessful attempts at ambient house, while also criticizing the "plodding continuance" of "Ethereal Connection" and mismatching ingredients of "Obsolete".

== Commercial performance ==
=== Oceania ===
In Australia, Parker's native country, Deadbeat debuted at number two on the ARIA Albums chart, earning Parker his fifth straight consecutive top ten album in the country across all of his projects. The album also debuted at number five on the Official Top 40 Albums chart in New Zealand respectively.

=== United States ===
In the United States, Deadbeat debuted at number four on the Billboard 200 with 70,000 album-equivalent units, consisting of 38,000 pure album sales and 28,000 on vinyl. It was Parker's highest first-week sales on vinyl, as well as his third top-five-charting project in the country.

== Track listing ==
All tracks are written by Kevin Parker; "Dracula", "Oblivion", and "Afterthought" are co-written with Sarah Aarons.

Track listing
No.	Title	Length
1.	"My Old Ways"	4:58
2.	"No Reply"	3:35
3.	"Dracula"	3:25
4.	"Loser"	3:43
5.	"Oblivion"	4:28
6.	"Not My World"	4:14
7.	"Piece of Heaven"	4:44
8.	"Obsolete"	4:23
9.	"Ethereal Connection"	7:42
10.	"See You on Monday (You're Lost)"	3:34
11.	"Afterthought"	4:01
12.	"End of Summer"	7:12
Total length:		56:05

=== Notes ===
- "Ethereal Connection" was initially released as an untitled B-side for "End of Summer", sold on Tame Impala's website in limited supply.

== Personnel ==
Credits adapted from the album's liner notes.

- Kevin Parker – performance, production, mixing
- Loren Humphrey – additional recording and production on "Dracula", "Loser", and "Obsolete"
- Matt Colton – mastering, cut
- Imogene Strauss – creative direction
- Julian Klincewicz – photography
- Irie Jean – photography assistance
- Special Offer, Inc. – art direction, design

== Charts ==
=== Weekly charts ===
Chart performance
Chart (2025–2026)	Peak position
Australian Albums (ARIA)	2
Austrian Albums (Ö3 Austria)	7
Belgian Albums (Ultratop Flanders)	5
Belgian Albums (Ultratop Wallonia)	6
Canadian Albums (Billboard)	6
Croatian International Albums (HDU)	27
Czech Albums (ČNS IFPI)	30
Danish Albums (Hitlisten)	7
Dutch Albums (Album Top 100)	2
Finnish Albums (Suomen virallinen lista)	26
French Albums (SNEP)	9
French Rock & Metal Albums (SNEP)	1
German Albums (Offizielle Top 100)	7
German Pop Albums (Offizielle Top 100)	3
Greek Albums (IFPI)	4
Hungarian Albums (MAHASZ)	10
Icelandic Albums (Tónlistinn)	4
Irish Albums (Official Charts)	6
Italian Albums (FIMI)	19
Japanese Download Albums (Billboard Japan)	48
Japanese Western Albums (Oricon)	23
Lithuanian Albums (AGATA)	9
New Zealand Albums (RMNZ)	5
Norwegian Albums (IFPI Norge)	10
Polish Albums (ZPAV)	15
Portuguese Albums (AFP)	2
Scottish Albums (Official Charts)	2
Slovak Albums (ČNS IFPI)	39
Spanish Albums (PROMUSICAE)	21
Swedish Albums (Sverigetopplistan)	11
Swiss Albums (Schweizer Hitparade)	8
UK Albums (Official Charts)	4
UK Progressive Albums (Official Charts)	1
US Billboard 200	4
US Top Dance Albums (Billboard)	1
US Top Rock & Alternative Albums (Billboard)	1

=== Year-end charts ===
Year-end chart performance for Deadbeat
Chart (2025)	Position
Australian Artist Albums (ARIA)	6
Australian Vinyl Albums (ARIA)	28

== Certifications ==
Certifications for Deadbeat
Region	Certification	Certified units/sales
Canada (Music Canada)	Gold	40,000^{‡}
France (SNEP)	Gold	50,000^{‡}
New Zealand (RMNZ)	Gold	7,500^{‡}
Poland (ZPAV)	Gold	15,000^{‡}
Portugal (AFP)	Gold	3,500^{‡}
^{‡} Sales+streaming figures based on certification alone.
