= Coachella 2027 =

Music festival in California, U.S

- Promotional lineup poster
- Date: April 9–18, 2027
- Locations: Empire Polo Club, Indio, California, United States
- Previous event: Coachella 2026
- Website: coachella.com

Coachella 2027 is an upcoming music and arts festival that will take place on Empire Polo Club, Indio, California on April 9 to 18, 2027. It is the 26th edition of the festival. The headlining performers are Dua Lipa, Tame Impala and SZA.

== Background ==
The Coachella Valley Music and Arts Festival, sometimes referred to as "Coachella Festival" or simply "Coachella," is held annually at the Empire Polo Club in Indio, United States. Founded by Paul Tollett and Rick Van Santen in 1999, the event features musical artists from many genres of music, including rock, pop, indie, hip hop and electronic dance music, as well as art installations and sculptures.

== Lineup ==
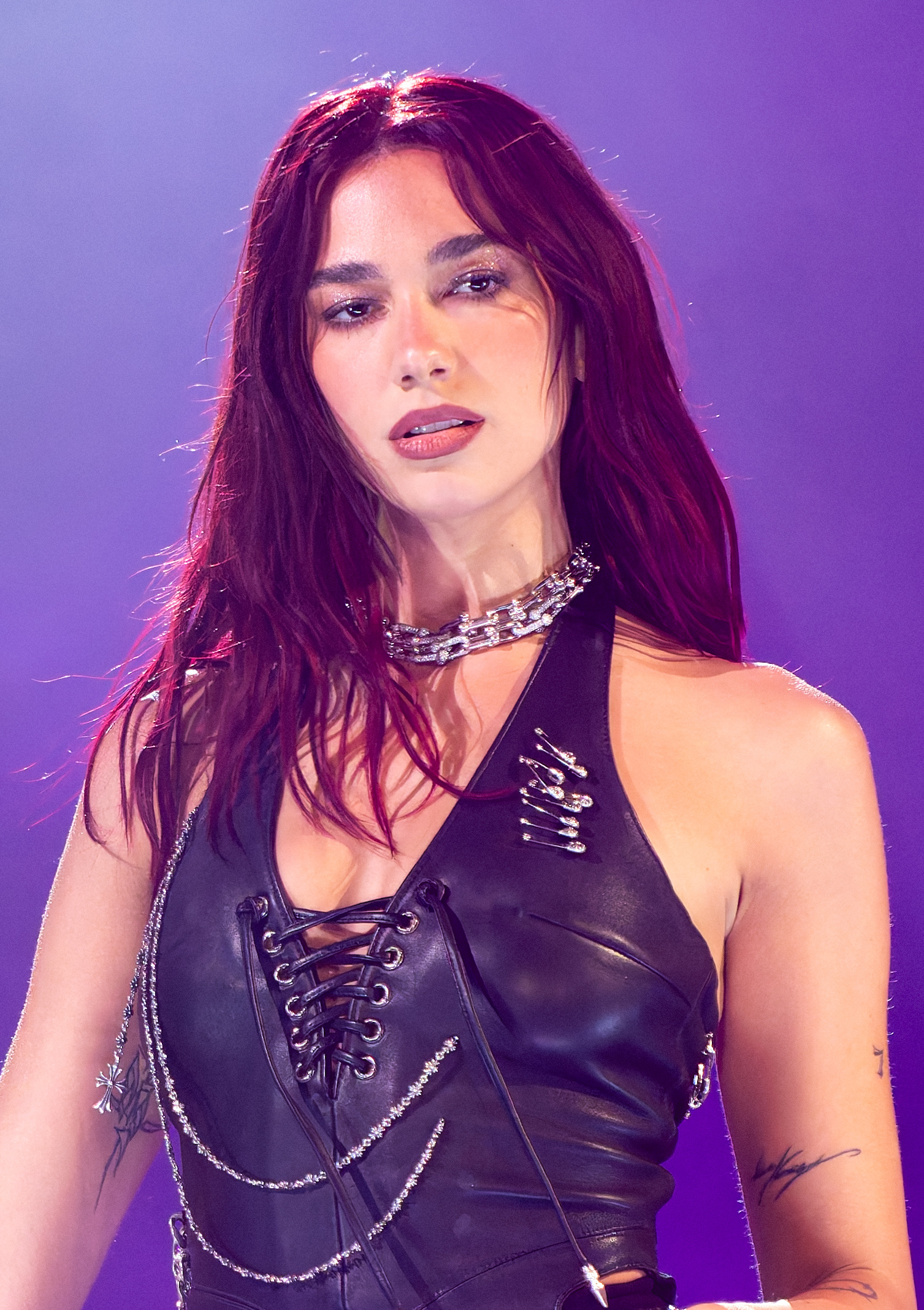
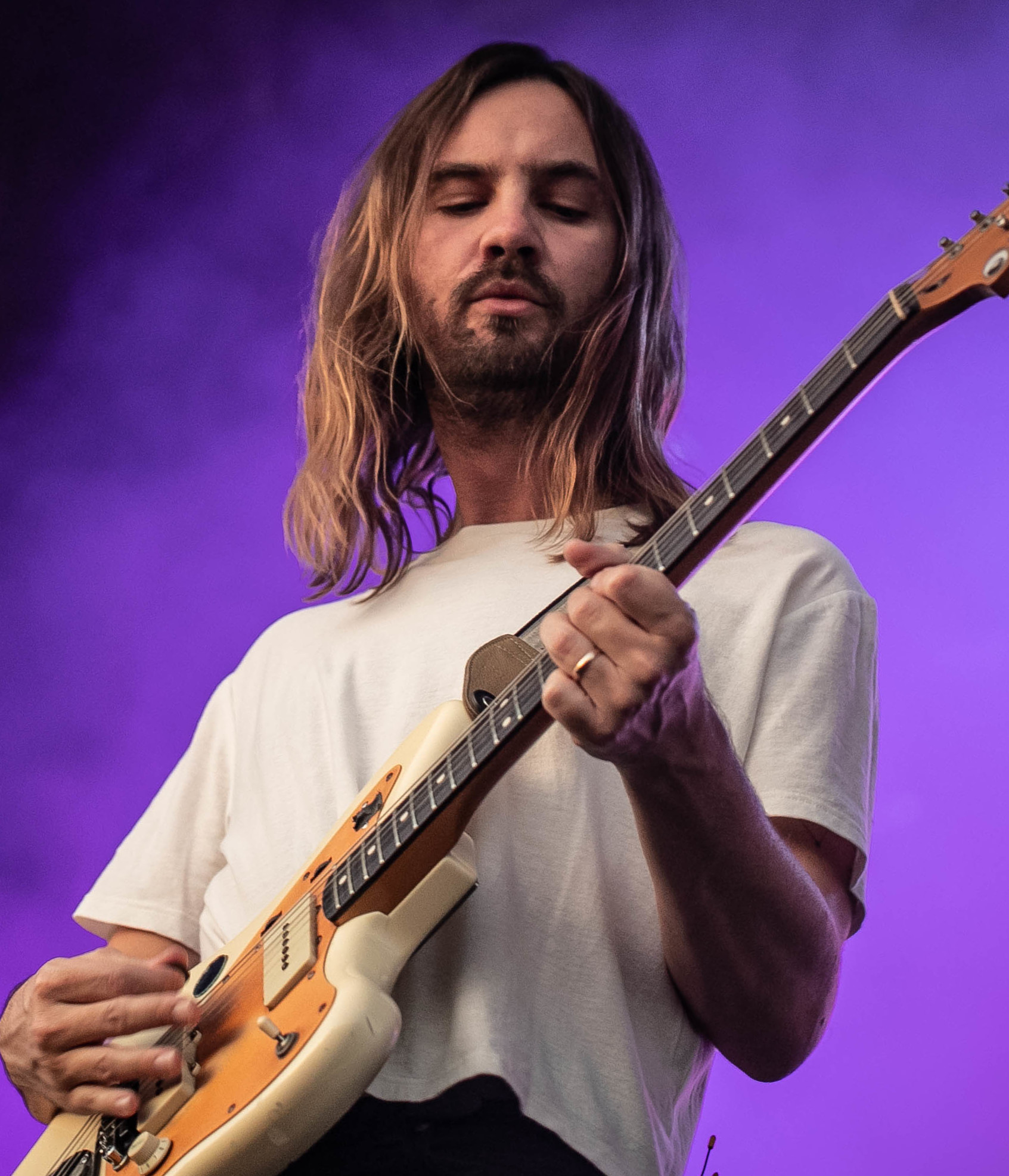
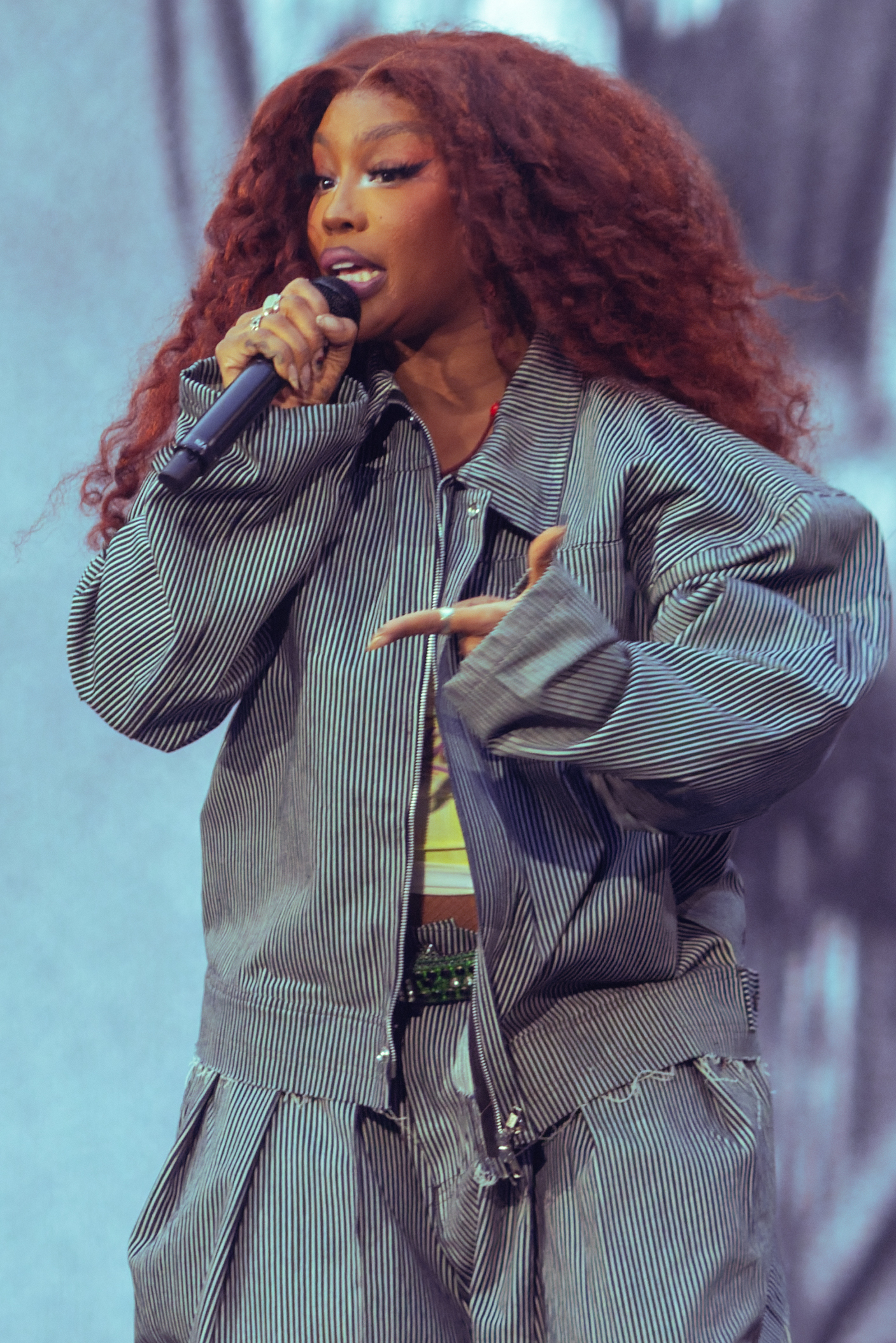
Coachella headliners Dua Lipa, Tame Impala, and SZA

SZA confirmed she was a headliner for the event before any official announcement had been made. The organizers of Coachella announced the lineup for the 2027 festival on November 11, 2026. The headliners were confirmed to be Dua Lipa, Tame Impala, and SZA, succeeding previous headliners Sabrina Carpenter, Justin Bieber, Karol G, and Anyma. This made Dua Lipa the first British woman to headline the event. Madonna is one of the performers in the lineup, marking her first time on an official line up in 20 years.

Other artists confirmed to be in the lineup included Daddy Yankee, Zara Larsson, Phoebe Bridgers, Underscores, Robyn, Steve Lacy, Kehlani, Empire of the Sun, Muna, Shygirl, Caroline Polachek, Kelela, Magdalena Bay, Leon Bridges, Tiësto, Weezer, Don Toliver, Adéla, Måneskin, Bassvictim, Peggy Gou, and Drain Gang.
