= List of Billboard Pop Airplay number-one songs of 2026 =

This is a list of songs which reached number one on the Billboard Pop Airplay chart in 2026.

== Chart history ==
Issue date	Song	Artist	Ref.
January 3	"Man I Need"	Olivia Dean	
January 10	"Man I Need"	Olivia Dean	
January 17	"Man I Need"	Olivia Dean	
January 24	"Man I Need"	Olivia Dean	
January 31	"Man I Need"	Olivia Dean	
February 7	"Back to Friends"	Sombr	
February 14	"Back to Friends"	Sombr	
February 21	"Man I Need"	Olivia Dean	
February 28	"Opalite"	Taylor Swift	
March 7	"Opalite"	Taylor Swift	
March 14	"Opalite"	Taylor Swift	
March 21	"I Just Might"	Bruno Mars	
March 28	"I Just Might"	Bruno Mars	
April 4	"I Just Might"	Bruno Mars	
April 11	"I Just Might"	Bruno Mars	
April 18	"I Just Might"	Bruno Mars	
April 25	"I Just Might"	Bruno Mars	
May 2	"So Easy (To Fall in Love)"	Olivia Dean	
May 9	"So Easy (To Fall in Love)"	Olivia Dean	
May 16	"So Easy (To Fall in Love)"	Olivia Dean	
May 23	"So Easy (To Fall in Love)"	Olivia Dean	
May 30	"So Easy (To Fall in Love)"	Olivia Dean	
June 6	"So Easy (To Fall in Love)"	Olivia Dean	
June 13	"So Easy (To Fall in Love)"	Olivia Dean	
June 20	"Stateside"	PinkPantheress and Zara Larsson	
June 27	"Midnight Sun"	Zara Larsson	
July 4	"Midnight Sun"	Zara Larsson	
July 11	"Dracula"	Tame Impala and Jennie	
July 18	"Dracula"	Tame Impala and Jennie	
July 25	"Dracula"	Tame Impala and Jennie	
August 1	"Dracula"	Tame Impala and Jennie	
August 8	"Dracula"	Tame Impala and Jennie	
August 15	"Risk It All"	Bruno Mars	
August 22	"Dracula"	Tame Impala and Jennie	
August 29	"Drop Dead"	Olivia Rodrigo	
September 5	"Dracula"	Tame Impala and Jennie	
September 12	"Hate That I Made You Love Me"	Ariana Grande	
September 19	"Hate That I Made You Love Me"	Ariana Grande	
September 26	"I Knew It, I Knew You"	Taylor Swift	
October 3	"Dracula"	Tame Impala and Jennie	
October 10	"Dracula"	Tame Impala and Jennie	
October 17	"Dracula"	Tame Impala and Jennie	
October 24	"Dracula"	Tame Impala and Jennie	
October 31	"Dracula"	Tame Impala and Jennie	
November 7	"Babydoll"	Dominic Fike	
November 14	"Mr. Know It All"	Teddy Swims	
November 21	"Mr. Know It All"	Teddy Swims	

== See also ==
- 2026 in American music
