= Soupe Opéra =

1991–2000 French TV series

- Title card
- Created by: Christophe Barrier; Frédéric Clémençon
- Music by: Garlo
- Country of origin: France
- No. of seasons: 2
- No. of episodes: 26

Production
- Running time: 2 mins
- Production company: Marlou Films

Original release
- Network: France 3
- Release: 1991 – 2000

Soupe Opéra (often referred to in English as Soup Opera) is a French children's stop motion television show by French animation studio, Marlou Films. Featuring fruits and vegetables turning themselves into different creatures and objects, the name of the series is a pun on the term "Soap Opera." A total of 26 two-minute episodes were made. In France, the series aired on the France 3 channel. A small cult following developed around the show years after it aired on Australia's ABC channel during the 1990s and early 2000s.

== Visuals ==
Alternative title card showing the artichoke, endive, and peach jackpot

The title sequence of each episode shows a fruits-and-vegetables slot machine, with an accompanying score as well as foley and sound effects. Two versions of the title sequence exist, both with slight visual differences and unique jackpot: three star fruits or an artichoke, an endive and a peach.

Episodes have no dialogue and are composed of several short animated sequences, each under a minute in length. In-between each segment, transition cards are shown that feature animated food sliding horizontally to the left.

The show's central animated sequences take place against a black backdrop and are realised entirely in stop-motion. In these sequences, various food objects (nearly always fruit and vegetables) appear to spontaneously exit a basket and "cut" themselves up into pieces, which then re-assemble to form animals, faces, and various other objects. The food then "performs" actions related to the object or animal that the food has been "assembled" into, often incorporating other pieces of food as part of the activity. For instance, a typical segment may consist of a collection of small fruits slicing themselves up to re-assemble in the shape of a chicken, which then proceeds to "peck" at several stray kernels of corn.

The food that emerges from the basket is usually fruit or vegetables, however, other foods may be used - such as an egg, a packet of chips or a bag of baking soda. Non-edible items are also featured occasionally, such as a pot and portable gas stove.

Several of Marlou Films' subsequent productions also feature themes of food and other objects re-arranging itself to form animals. In 1993, Marlou produced Poubelles (Dustbins), a show featuring rubbish coming out of a bin to create an animal, and their 1998 programme Les animaux des quatre saisons (The Four Seasons Animals) followed the lives of various animals, all of which are made from fruit and vegetables (many of whom appear on Soupe Opéra). A similar concept of food being turned into animals was again used by Marlou in their 2007 TV series Miam Miam! (Yum Yum!), and was also used a year later in their programme mise en plis (Folded in Two) instead featuring animals being made out of origami.

== Soundtrack ==
Soupe Opéra features a distinctive soundtrack, composed specifically for the show by French artist Garlo. Music in Soupe Opera is manually performed on a keyboard sampler, and most tracks are composed entirely of edited samples of the human voice.

Additionally, a short title theme (resembling the jingle of a slot machine) accompanies the title cards and transitional sequences, while the credits theme is an instrumental synth-funk arrangement of the main animation's score.

Sound effects for the series were sourced from Sound Ideas.

== International broadcast ==
Internationally, Soupe Opéra aired in Australia on ABC1 and its sister channel, ABC2, during the ABC 4 Kids line-up. In the UK, it aired on ITV during its CITV children's block and later on the CITV channel. In the United States and Latin America, the series aired on Cartoon Network as part of its Small World anthology series, which featured foreign-made shorts. The show had also been broadcast in other countries, such as CBC Television in Canada, as well as Canal Once in Mexico.

== Following ==
The show has developed a cult following. Long after broadcast ceased, non-official uploads of Soupe Opéra episodes attained hundreds of thousands of views on YouTube (Marlou Films has since uploaded the entire series of 26 episodes to their own YouTube channel). Australian audiences in particular have noted an appreciation for the show due to its broadcasting on free-to-air children's television in the 2000s, with several publications writing retrospectives on the show's popularity. An article by BuzzFeed noted that its monochromatic backdrop and synthesised vocal score led to it being perceived as esoteric and occasionally frightening, and Australian youth publication Junkee described the programme as "unintentionally horrifying". In 2023, Melbourne band Playlunch released a single titled "Soupe Opéra" with lyrics describing the show's cultural impact on Australian youth. In 2025, Melbourne-based podcast Thumbcramps brought the show back into the spotlight on their episode about Balan Wonderworld. One of their listeners had written in, comparing the show to the Bagpuss intro song.
