= My Old Ways =

2025 single by Tame Impala

Single by Tame Impala

from the album Deadbeat
- Released: 17 October 2025
- Recorded: 2023–2025
- Studio: Kevin Parker's home studio (Fremantle, Western Australia); Wave House (Injidup, Western Australia)
- Genre: House; psychedelia
- Length: 4:58
- Label: Columbia
- Songwriter: Kevin Parker
- Producer: Kevin Parker

Tame Impala singles chronology
"Dracula" (2025)	"My Old Ways" (2025)	"Dracula" (with Jennie) (2026)

Music video
- "My Old Ways" on YouTube

"My Old Ways" is a song by Tame Impala, the musical project of Australian multi-instrumentalist Kevin Parker. It is the opening track on the project's fifth studio album, Deadbeat, and it was released as its fourth single on 17 October 2025, the same day as the album.

"My Old Ways" was voted in at number 40 on the 2025 Triple J Hottest 100.

== Composition ==
The song begins with only vocals and a looped, echoey, jazzy piano lick that conveys a somber atmosphere. At around a minute, during the line "Back into my old ways again" in the chorus, the song introduces a thumping beat with a house rhythm, "muscular" bass and kick drums, and synths. Lyrically, Kevin Parker exudes distress as he berates himself for relapsing into his bad habits, additionally confessing he is "barely coping" and "always fuckin' up to something". He sings with a "quavering falsetto", and stresses his vocals in the hook.

== Critical reception ==
The song received generally positive reviews. Ryan Dillon of Glide Magazine wrote "Ironically, Tame Impala's departure from the past kicks off with a thudding tune called 'My Old Ways,' a mesmerizing, harmony-filled introduction to this new era of Tame Impala. While the opening song to Impala's fifth LP is shocking, it doubles as a reassurance for long-time fans. Even as their sonic landscape changes, Parker is still penning palpable, introspective lyrics." Helen Brown of The Independent remarked, "Deadbeat starts intimate and confessional, with what might be the best opening track of the year. 'My Old Ways' is a song that lets fans into the rawness of the rehearsal room before the production elevates intimacy into euphoria." Charles Lyons-Burt of Slant Magazine considered "My Old Ways" one of the strongest songs from Deadbeat, writing that it "has a nice build to it". Nicholas Russell of Under the Radar stated "There's no denying Deadbeat's slick production and delightful details, as in the refreshingly raw demo that starts album opener 'My Old Ways.'"

Reviewing the album for The Irish Times, Ed Power criticized the songs for sounding overly similar. He elaborated that "The biggest departure is right at the start, with My Old Ways", noting that "His gripe is one that recurs across popular music. An artist has success beyond their wildest imagination, only to find that their demons remain and that wealth and fame have not cured their melancholy – may have magnified it, in fact." Pitchfork's Alphonse Pierre wrote that the piano lick "might achieve liftoff in better hands; but Marshall Jefferson he is not, so we're largely stuck on repeat while the track shuffles along for five minutes, unable to decide if it's just an intro or actually going somewhere." Shaad D'Souza of Resident Advisor commented "There's a lack of detail on vibe-forward cuts, like 'My Old Ways,' (which rarely deviates from a rigid 4/4 beat), that expose Parker's inexperience as a club producer."

The song was also featured in Episode 1 of Dexter: Resurrection Season 2.

== Music video ==
The music video was released alongside the single. It sees Kevin Parker performing in a cramped apartment and traversing a city, later sitting and walking by the shore at the beach.

== Charts ==
=== Weekly charts ===
Weekly chart performance for "My Old Ways"
Chart (2025)	Peak position
Australia (ARIA)	61
Canada Hot 100 (Billboard)	56
France (SNEP)	187
Global 200 (Billboard)	75
Ireland (IRMA)	37
Lithuania Airplay (TopHit)	39
Netherlands (Single Top 100)	72
New Zealand Hot Singles (RMNZ)	1
Norway (IFPI Norge)	58
Portugal (AFP)	47
Switzerland (Schweizer Hitparade)	54
UK Singles (Official Charts)	39
US Billboard Hot 100	56
US Hot Rock & Alternative Songs (Billboard)	8

=== Monthly charts ===
Monthly chart performance for "My Old Ways"
Chart (2025)	Peak position
Lithuania Airplay (TopHit)	69
