= Playlunch (band) =

Australian funk band

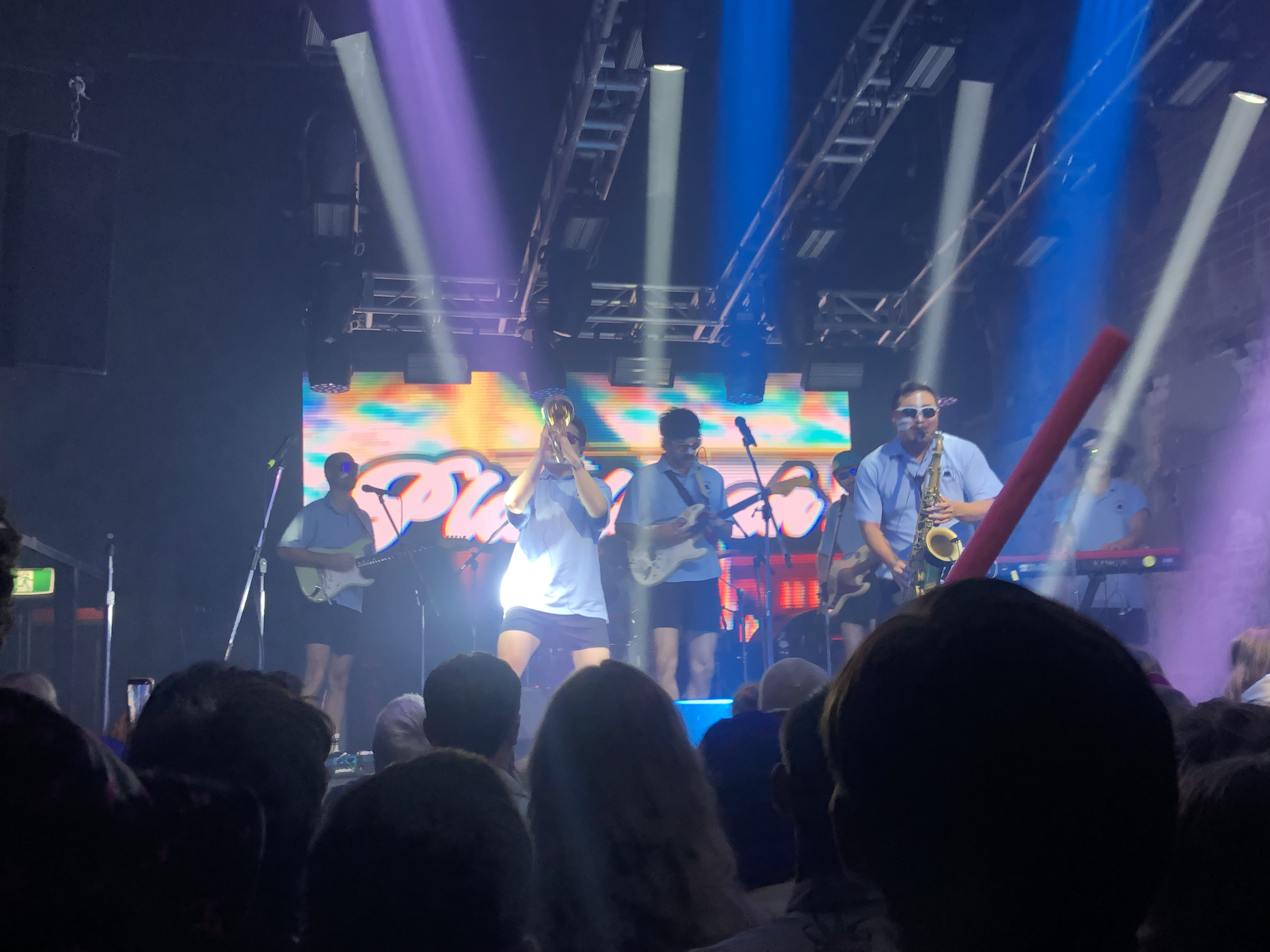

Background information
- Origin: Melbourne, Victoria, Australia
- Genre: Funk rock
- Years active: 2022–present
- Label: ABC Music
- Members: Liam Bell; Michael D'Emilio; Tom Kindermann; Dylan Knur; Jerry Li; Andre "Supreme" Lew; Austin Richardson
- Website: playlunchband.square.site

Playlunch are a seven-member Australian band from Melbourne, Victoria, which formed in 2022.

The band was formed during Melbourne's COVID-19 lockdowns, originating as the project of lead singer Liam Bell, who began writing funk songs in a share house home-studio in Melbourne's eastern suburbs. Prior to forming Playlunch, several members had been part of Parkville, a folk band.

They have described their style as "bogan funk" and lyrically they have been said to capture "all the mundane details of Aussie culture with sharp wit and fond affection" with songs referencing Zooper Doopers, Healthy Harold, and Coles supermarkets.

The band members are Liam Bell (lead singer, guitarist), Michael D'Emilio (keyboardist/synth), Tom Kindermann (guitarist), Dylan Knur (bassist), Jerry Li (trumpeter), Andre Lew (saxophonist) and Austin Richardson (drummer).

In November 2024, the band signed with the label ABC Music.

== Career ==
=== 2022–2024: Who's Ready For a Good Time? ===
Playlunch's initial fame came from their song "Soupe Opera", which samples the French television show of the same name and went viral on TikTok. "Soupe Opera" was followed by "Hornbag", the name of which is a reference to Australian comedy show Kath & Kim. Both songs were later part of the band's debut LP Who's Ready For a Good Time, which was released in 2023. In 2024, the band signed with ABC Music.

Playlunch performed at the BIGSOUND 2024 music conference, and was well received by reviewers.

=== 2025–2026: Sex Ed ===
The band's album Sex Ed was released on 22 August 2025, and described as funk rock by the ABC. The album received positive reviews and was called "tongue-in-cheek". A live performance off the back of the album's release was well received by The AU Review.

The album's single "Keith", the video for which features acting from AFL player Barry Hall, was released ahead of the album and went viral. The song describes a man who becomes continuously angrier as multiple people park in the parking spot outside of his house. Marketing for the song also involved a hotline 1800-KEITH where fans were encouraged to call in with their stories of their own "Keiths". "Keith" placed #4 in the 2025 Triple J Hottest 100.

In 2025, Playlunch covered "It's Raining Men" for Triple J's Like a Version, later released as a single.

The music video for the album's single "Real Estate Apps" featured comedy group Aunty Donna and housing activist Jordan van den Lamb.

In 2026, Playlunch announced a North American tour and were announced as performers for the BASSINTHEGRASS music festival.

== Discography ==
=== Studio albums ===
List of studio albums, with release date, label, formats, and selected chart positions shown
Title	Album details	Peak chart positions
Title	Album details	AUS
Who's Ready for a Good Time?	Released: 17 November 2023; Label: Playlunch; Format: CD, LP, digital download, streaming	—
Sex Ed	Released: 22 August 2025; Label: ABC Music (ABCM0046D / ABCM0051); Format: CD, LP, digital download, streaming	71
"—" denotes an album that did not chart or was not released in that territory.

=== Singles ===
List of singles, with year released, selected chart positions, and album name shown
Title	Year	Peak chart positions	Album
Title	Year	AUS	Album
"No Hat No Play"	2022	—	Who's Ready for a Good Time?
"Soupe Opera"	2022	—	Who's Ready for a Good Time?
"Foxtel Girl"	2022	—	Who's Ready for a Good Time?
"Blue Light Disco"	2023	—	Who's Ready for a Good Time?
"Station Rat"	2024	—	Sex Ed
"Boys"	2025	—	Sex Ed
"Keith"	2025	53	Sex Ed
"Real Estate Apps" (featuring Aunty Donna)	2025	—	Sex Ed
"3310"	2026	—	TBA
"—" denotes a single that did not chart or was not released in that territory.

==== Promotional singles ====
List of promotional singles, with year released and album details shown
Title	Year	Album
"It's Raining Men" (Triple J Like a Version)	2025	Non-album single

== Awards and nominations ==
=== AIR Awards ===
The Australian Independent Record Awards (commonly known informally as AIR Awards) is an annual awards night to recognise, promote and celebrate the success of Australia's Independent Music sector.

Year	Nominee / work	Award	Result	Ref.
2026	"Keith"	Independent Song of the Year	Nominated	
2026	Playlunch and ABC Music for "Keith"	Independent Marketing Team of the Year	Nominated	
2026	Sex Ed	Best Independent Rock Album or EP	Won	

=== APRA Awards ===
The APRA Awards are presented annually from 1982 by the Australasian Performing Right Association (APRA), "honouring composers and songwriters". They commenced in 1982.

Year	Nominee / work	Award	Result	Ref.
2026	"Keith" (Liam Bell)	Song of the Year	Shortlisted	

=== J Awards ===
The J Awards are an annual series of Australian music awards that were established by the Australian Broadcasting Corporation's youth-focused radio station Triple J. They commenced in 2005.

Year	Nominee / work	Award	Result	Ref.
2025	"Keith" (directed by Riley Nimbs)	Australian Video of the Year	Nominated	
2025	Playlunch	Unearthed Artist of the Year	Nominated	
