= Keith (Playlunch song) =

2025 single by Playlunch

Single by Playlunch
- Released: 13 June 2025
- Genre: Funk
- Length: 4:11
- Label: ABC Music
- Songwriter: Liam Christopher Bell
- Producers: Sean Kenihan, Liam Bell

Playlunch singles chronology
"Boys" (2025)	"Keith" (2025)	"It's Raining Men (Note: Triple J Like a Version cover)" (2025)

"Keith" is a 2025 single released by Australian band Playlunch. "Keith" follows an angry neighbour who enforces strict parking rules in his street.

The song was later made part of Playlunch's second album, Sex Ed.

The song placed number four in Triple J's Hottest 100 of 2025.

== History ==
To promote the song, Playlunch launched a phone line called 1800 F KEITH (1800 353 484) and encouraged callers to tell stories of "Keiths" they had experienced in their own lives.

== Reception ==
Cecilia Pattison Levi from The Live Wire said of the song, "The song has a fantastic driving guitar riff, thumping bassline and euphoric electropop. The lyricism is inspired by the real-life tradie neighbour from hell whose real name is unknown from when the band lived at Hotham Street."

The song placed number four in Triple J's Hottest 100 of 2025.

== Music video ==
The video for "Keith" stars former AFL (Australian Football League) player Barry Hall as Keith. Liam Bell from Playlunch describes the character Keith as "Inseparable from his Ute and beloved two-wheeler trailer, Keith would terrorise the streets verbally assaulting anyone who dared leave their car in the on-street parking out front of his house". Bell said that the story portrayed in the song is inspired by his own experiences.
