= Loser (Tame Impala song) =

2025 single by Tame Impala

Single by Tame Impala

from the album Deadbeat
- Released: 3 September 2025
- Genre: Psychedelic pop; funk
- Length: 3:44; 4:28 (Fcukers Remix)
- Label: Columbia
- Songwriter: Kevin Parker
- Producer: Kevin Parker

Tame Impala singles chronology
"End of Summer" (2025)	"Loser" (2025)	"Dracula" (2025)

Music video
- "Loser" on YouTube

"Loser" is a song by Tame Impala, the musical project of Australian multi-instrumentalist Kevin Parker. The song, released on 3 September 2025, is the second single from Tame Impala's fifth studio album, Deadbeat. In late August 2025, Tame Impala teased the track via posters and social media clips featuring the word "Loser" and the numbers "9.3".

At the APRA Music Awards of 2026, the song was nominated for Song of the Year.

== Background and promotion ==
"Loser" follows Tame Impala's July 2025 single "End of Summer", which marked the project's debut on Columbia Records and was released with a video by director Julian Klincewicz. In August 2025, some fans noticed that Kevin Parker was not the credited writer and producer for "End of Summer" on Spotify or Tidal; instead, the person listed in both spots was "loser ." [sic]

On 25 August 2025, NME reported that Tame Impala had "seemingly announced" a new single titled "Loser" after the project's official channels shared imagery and posters bearing the title and "9.3". Rolling Stone Australia subsequently covered similar posters spotted in multiple cities and described the date as indicating a 3 September release. Additional outlets relayed the teaser from Instagram Stories and street posters. Speaking to Belgium's Studio Brussel radio, Kevin Parker stated that the song was inspired by Turkish rock musician Barış Manço.

== Release ==
The song was released on 3 September 2025. An accompanying music video for "Loser", directed by Sam Kristofski and starring Joe Keery (also known as Djo), premiered alongside the song. Alternative rock singer Beck also makes a cameo easter egg appearance in the video, as a nod to his 1993 hit song also titled "Loser". On 4 September 2025, Tame Impala officially announced a fifth studio album, Deadbeat.

On 23 September 2026, it was announced that a remix of the song by the American electronic band Fcukers was releasing that Friday.

== Live performances and usage ==
Tame Impala performed the song on the 2025–2027 Deadbeat Tour.

The song appeared in the 2026 film Spider-Man: Brand New Day. It also impacted US contemporary hit radio stations on 8 August 2026 as the second US single from Deadbeat, following "Dracula".

== Charts ==
=== Weekly charts ===
Weekly chart performance
Chart (2025–2026)	Peak position
Australia (ARIA)	7
Australia Airplay (RCS)	19
Austria (Ö3 Austria Top 40)	10
Belgium (Ultratop 50 Flanders)	46
Belgium (Ultratop 50 Wallonia)	5
Bolivia (Billboard)	18
Canada Hot 100 (Billboard)	15
Canada CHR/Top 40 (Billboard)	29
Canada Hot AC (Billboard)	39
Canada Mainstream Rock (Billboard Canada)	27
Canada Modern Rock (Billboard Canada)	2
Central America Anglo Airplay (Monitor Latino)	6
Colombia Anglo Airplay (Monitor Latino)	3
CIS Airplay (TopHit)	187
Costa Rica Anglo Airplay (Monitor Latino)	4
Croatia International Airplay (Top lista)	82
Czech Republic Singles Digital (ČNS IFPI)	22
Ecuador Anglo Airplay (Monitor Latino)	9
Estonia Airplay (TopHit)	127
France (SNEP)	19
Germany (GfK)	21
Germany Airplay (MusicTrace)	73
Global 200 (Billboard)	3
Greece International (IFPI)	2
Guatemala Anglo Airplay (Monitor Latino)	11
Iceland (Billboard)	23
India International (IMI)	1
Ireland (IRMA)	11
Israel (Mako Hitlist)	83
Latvia Streaming (LaIPA)	7
Lebanon (Lebanese Top 20)	1
Lithuania (AGATA)	8
Luxembourg (Billboard)	13
Middle East and North Africa (IFPI)	19
Mexico Anglo Airplay (Monitor Latino)	14
Netherlands (Single Top 100)	47
New Zealand (Recorded Music NZ)	10
Norway (VG-lista)	9
Panama International (PRODUCE)	38
Peru Anglo Airplay (Monitor Latino)	14
Poland Airplay (OLiS)	19
Poland Streaming (OLiS)	21
Portugal (AFP)	50
Romania (Billboard)	15
Russia Streaming (TopHit)	73
Saudi Arabia (IFPI)	20
Singapore (RIAS)	16
Slovakia Singles Digital (ČNS IFPI)	13
Sweden (Sverigetopplistan)	26
Switzerland (Schweizer Hitparade)	8
United Arab Emirates (IFPI)	6
UK Singles (Official Charts)	10
US Billboard Hot 100	18
US Adult Pop Airplay (Billboard)	16
US Hot Rock & Alternative Songs (Billboard)	2
US Pop Airplay (Billboard)	16
US Rock & Alternative Airplay (Billboard)	6

=== Monthly charts ===
Monthly chart performance
Chart (2026)	Peak position
Lithuania Airplay (TopHit)	44
Panama Streaming (PRODUCE)	179

== Certifications ==
Certifications
Region	Certification	Certified units/sales
France (SNEP)	Gold	100,000^{‡}
Hungary (MAHASZ)	Gold	2,000^{‡}
New Zealand (RMNZ)	Gold	15,000^{‡}
Portugal (AFP)	Gold	12,000^{‡}
United Kingdom (BPI)	Silver	200,000^{‡}
Streaming
Greece (IFPI Greece)	Gold	1,000,000^{†}
Slovakia (ČNS IFPI)	Gold	850,000^{†}
^{‡} Sales+streaming figures based on certification alone.^{†} Streaming-only figures based on certification alone.

== Release history ==
Release history
Region	Date	Format(s)	Label	Ref.
Various	3 September 2025	Digital download; streaming	Columbia	
United States	11 August 2026	Contemporary hit radio	Columbia	
Italy	4 September 2026	Radio airplay	Sony	
