= Slab (car) =

Slang term for a heavily customized car

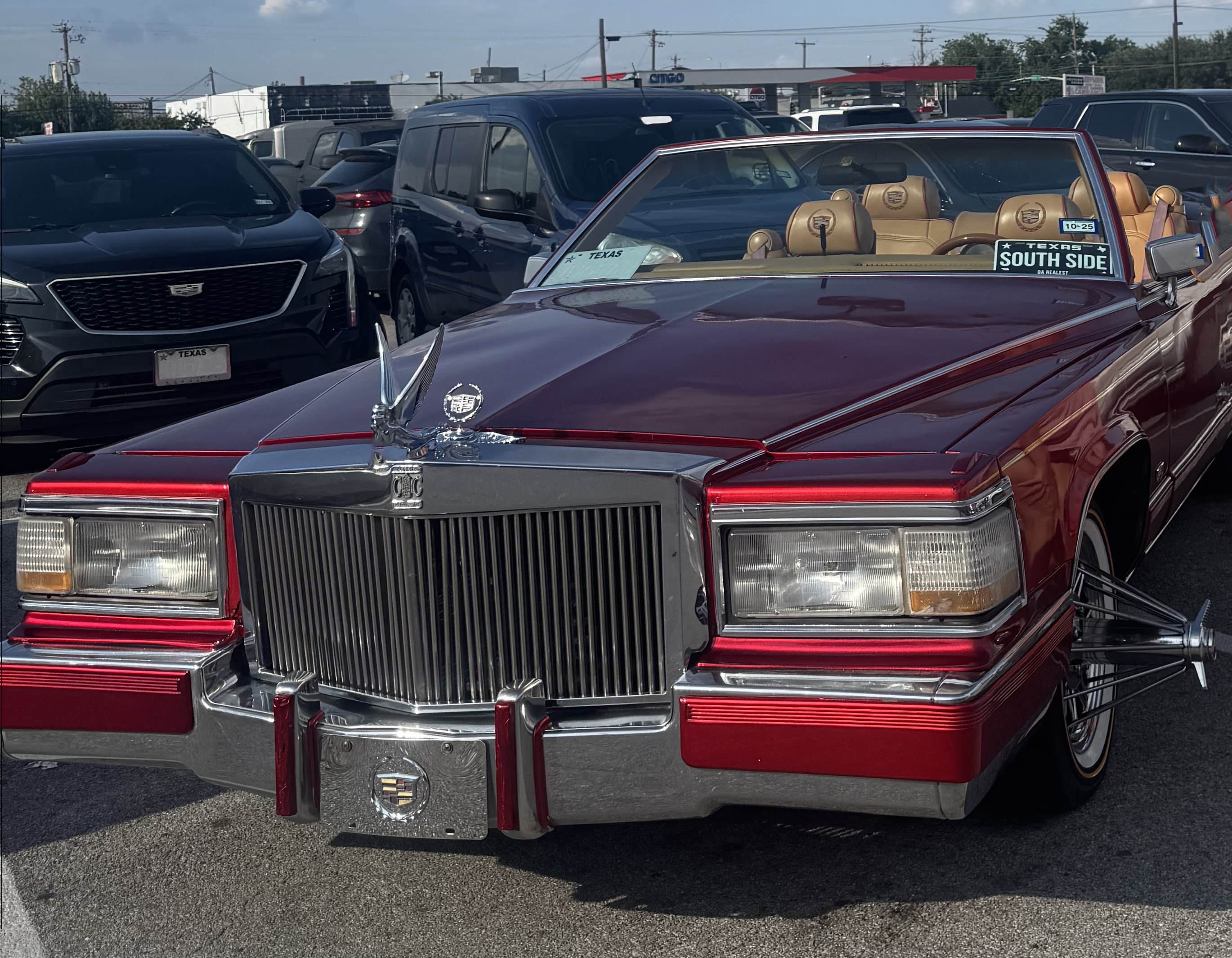
Candy red slab convertible with elbows

Slab (sometimes in all capital letters) is a slang term for Concrete/Streets Of Houston/ The BLVD etc. that describes a custom car, music and surrounding culture that's associated with African American hip-hop culture that emerged in the Houston area.

Slab music emerged in the 1990s as a form of music that incorporated chopped and screwed music altered in a mass commercial (or radio) friendly way rather than the underground mixtapes released at the time. The music is said to be made to be played in a slab vehicle. The acronym "slow, loud and bangin'" also describes the music as its tempo is less than the typical hip hop music at the time (slow), the volume is typically high while played in the car (loud), and the beat is typically bassy (bangin'). The lyrics of slab music often depict driving a slab such as in Paul Wall's Sittin' Sidewayz and Fat Pat's Tops Down.

It is a slang term for a car with bright candy paint and large chrome wheels, among other customizations. Slabs emerged in the 1980s Houston and saw the most popularity in the 1990s and 2000s. Slabs are synonymous with Texas rap culture, and the drivers of Slabs would usually play loud rap music and drive slowly thus the "Slab" (slow, loud, and bangin') term. Another view is that the term "slab" refers to the slabs of concrete that make up the street, as in taking out a custom car on the concrete slab of a Houston freeway."

In addition to the music and car, the "slow" also refers to the recreational use of lean which has a "slow down effect" and also developed in the culture.

== History ==
The origins and evolution of Slab Culture in Houston can be outlined through key developments over the decades:

=== Early 1980s: emergence of slab culture ===
Slab Culture began to take shape in Houston's predominantly African American neighborhoods during the early 1980s. Enthusiasts started customizing vehicles—often older American sedans—by adding distinctive features such as "swangas" (extended wire rims) and vibrant paint jobs. The term "slab" is believed to refer to the "slow, loud, and bangin'" nature of these modified cars.

=== Mid to late 1980s: cultural integration ===
As the 1980s progressed, Slab Culture became more intertwined with Houston's burgeoning hip-hop scene. Artists like DJ Screw pioneered the "chopped and screwed" style, characterized by slowed-down tempos and remixing techniques, which resonated with the laid-back cruising associated with slab cars. This synergy between music and car culture reinforced the identity of the community.

=== 1990s: Mainstream recognition and expansion ===
The 1990s saw Slab Culture gain wider recognition beyond Houston. Local hip-hop artists, including members of the Screwed Up Click, featured slabs in their music videos and lyrics, bringing national attention to the movement. The culture's aesthetics influenced fashion trends and inspired other car customization styles across the Southern United States.

=== 2000s: Institutional acknowledgment ===
In the 2000s, Slab Culture began to receive institutional recognition as an integral part of Houston's cultural heritage. Events like the Houston SLAB Parade & Family Festival celebrated the community's creativity and contributions, while museums and universities documented the history and significance of the movement.

=== 2010s and beyond: continued evolution ===
Entering the 2010s, Slab Culture continued to evolve, adapting to new automotive technologies and digital platforms. Social media allowed enthusiasts to share their customized vehicles with a global audience, fostering a broader appreciation for the culture. Despite these changes, the core values of community, creativity, and individuality remained central to Slab Culture's enduring legacy. These cars are still featured in music videos by Houston rappers, such as Kirko Bangz's Cups Up Tops Down and Mexican OT's Johnny Dang.

== Elements ==
Slabs have bright "candy" paint in colorful hues, contrasting many modern grey, black, and white cars. They often feature gold and whitewall tires on chrome wire wheels which may protrude like a cone horizontally, colloquially called "Swangas" or "elbows." They may also feature "cartoonish" central poker protruding centers, the longest being 24 in (61 cm). A simulated Continental kit that include a fiberglass spare wheel and marching "elbow" are often added to the rear.

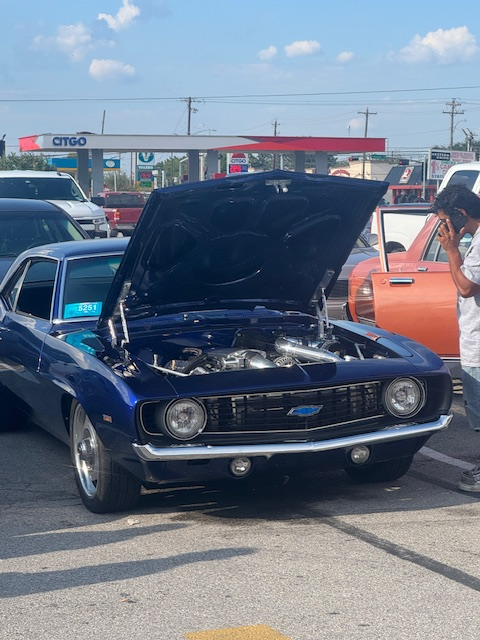
Blue Chevy slab with hood up

The customized cars are typically American brands like Cadillac, Chevrolet, Lincoln, and Buick. Many are retro cars like the Cadillac DeVille or old Chevrolet Impalas. Slabs may have lowered suspension from hydraulics. Some Slabs have constantly open or "popped" trunks that contain neon signs, amplifiers, and speakers. The high-powered sound systems with massive subwoofers can shatter plate glass store windows. Owners also put custom messages under the trunk lid.

Slabs are similar to Californian lowrider cars, with retro American cars, bright colors, low suspension, and association with hip-hop. However, the large wheels, occasional usage of more modern cars, and trunk "popping" makes Slabs distinct from lowriders. The design of Slab cars borrows inspiration from cars driven by pimps and gangsters in the 1970s "Blaxploitation" films.

== Process of modification ==
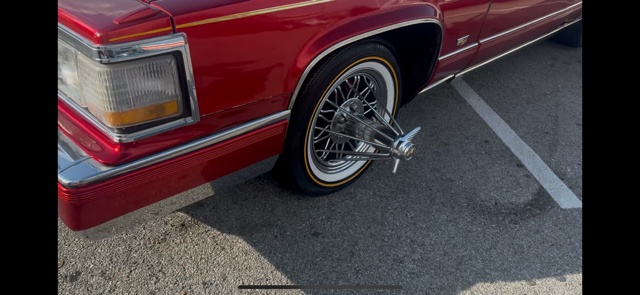
Slab with elbows

A slab usually starts off as a big-bodied American sedan without modification. These cars are modified over a long period of time, typically around 5 years. A slab can cost anywhere between $10,000 to $50,000 to construct.

== In hip-hop culture ==
Slabs are a part of Texas rap culture, named after how Slab drivers played rap in the car. They were frequently mentioned in and played in 2000s and 1990s Texas rap songs. Rappers like Chamillionaire, Pimp C, Bun B, Paul Wall, Slim Thug, Big Pokey, Z-Ro, and Mike Jones would mention Slabs in their songs. Additionally, the chopped and screwed style of Southern rap, which involved slowing rap songs and then repeating or skipping beats, popularized by DJ Screw and DJ Mike Watts, made Slabs more popular as part of Slab culture is slow driving, which fit the style of low tempo chopped and screwed songs.

Although slab music mostly refers to the 90s-2000s genre centered on Houston artists such as UGK, Paul Wall and Mike Jones, the genre set a lasting impact on hip hop overall.

== Community ==
Slab Sunday is a weekly community car meet on Sunday, where Slab enthusiasts meet up to socialize. These cars are often seen congregating in a slow parade, swerving side to side, often taking up a whole street.
