= Swangas =

Type of wheel rim

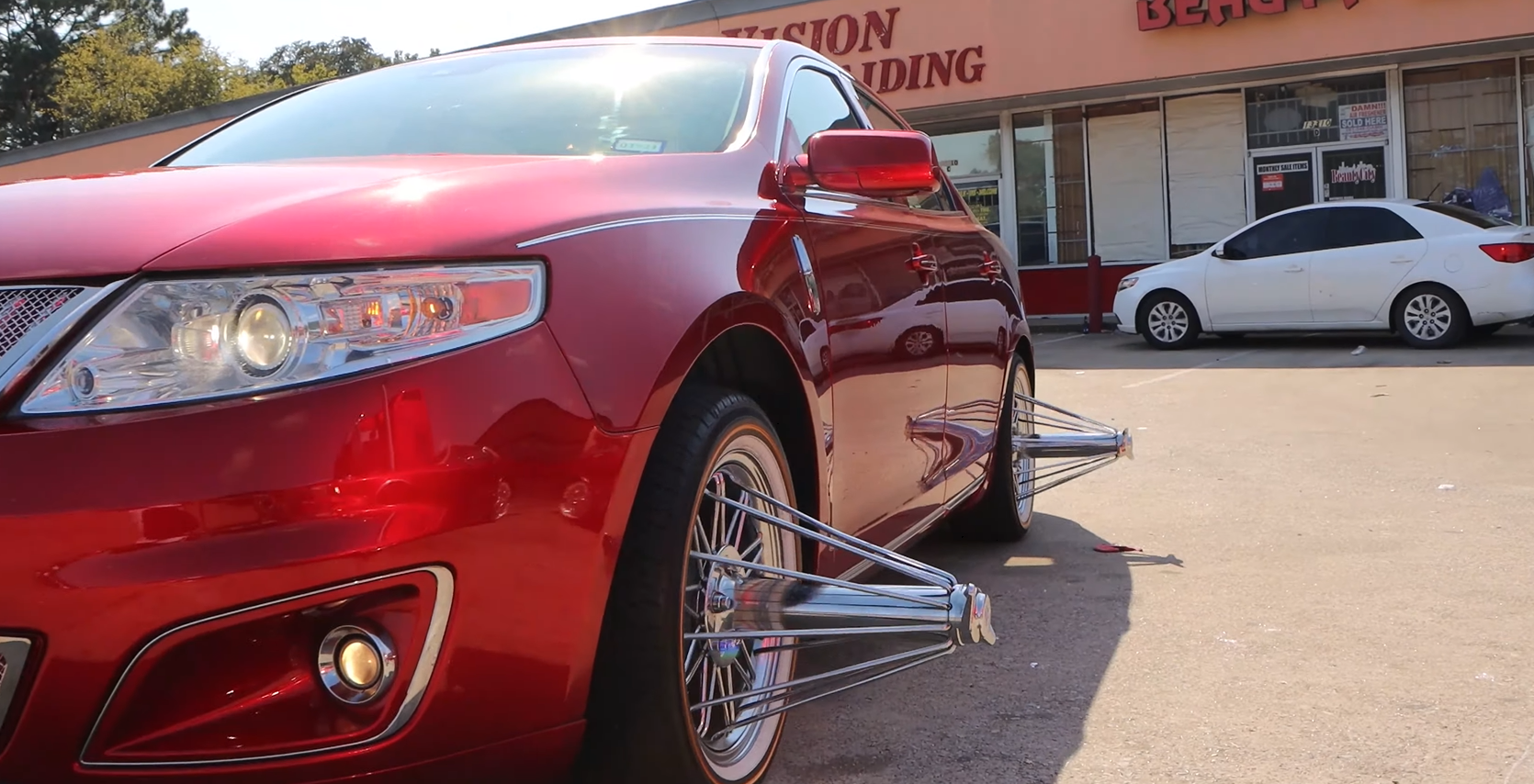
Swangas

Swangas (also spelled swangaz, and colloquially known as elbows (or elbos), 83s, or 84s (or simply 4s)) are custom extended wire-spoke wheel rims associated with slab car culture of Houston, Texas. These distinctive rims protrude several inches outward from a vehicle's wheel well and are a signature visual element of Slabs, highly customized vehicles that emerged in the Houston metropolitan area during the 1980s.

== Description ==
Swangas are aftermarket wire-spoke rims that extend horizontally from the wheel hub, often by up to 20 inches or more. They are characterized by multiple chrome spokes and a long "poker" or central spoke that gives them a pronounced, outward-facing appearance. Generally, the more the "poker" extends out, the more expensive and more respected the swangas are.

== Etymology ==
The name swangas likely derives from the slang term "swangin'," which describes the driving style of Slab vehicles as they slowly weave through traffic to display their custom features.

== History ==
Swangas first became popular in the early 1980s, coinciding with the rise of slab culture in Houston. Original swangas were made by the Cragar Wire Wheel Company for Cadillac models from the late 1970s and early 1980s. The first generation was referred to as 83s and the second generation 84s. Both the 83s and 84s were rare because they stopped being produced due to a production flaw until Texan Wire Wheels began producing them again in the early 2000s. Their scarcity made them highly desirable in slab culture, signaling exclusivity. Sometimes they could cost up to $10,000. It was also referred to as "Dead Man Wheels", in reference to the notion that people would kill to obtain them. Enthusiasts soon began modifying and extending them to create increasingly flamboyant custom styles.

As slab culture evolved, swangas became a central element of the custom aesthetic, often paired with bright “candy” paint, large sound systems, and other personalized modifications. Houston rap music of the 1990s and 2000s frequently referenced swangas and slab culture, cementing their place in local popular culture.

== Legal considerations ==
Because swangas extend significantly beyond a vehicle's body, they can raise safety and legal concerns in some jurisdictions. For example, some state laws like Texas and Oregon place a limit on total vehicle width, which can restrict how far these custom rims can protrude while remaining legal to drive on public roads.

== See also ==
- Scythed chariot – An ancient, military counterpart
