= End of Summer (song) =

2025 single by Tame Impala

Single by Tame Impala

from the album Deadbeat
- B-side: "Ethereal Connection"
- Released: 25 July 2025
- Genre: Acid house; EDM; techno; Balearic house
- Length: 7:14
- Label: Columbia
- Songwriter: Kevin Parker
- Producer: Kevin Parker

Tame Impala singles chronology
"Neverender" (2024)	"End of Summer" (2025)	"Loser" (2025)

Music video
- "End Of Summer" on YouTube

"End Of Summer" is a song by Tame Impala, the musical project of the Australian multi-instrumentalist Kevin Parker. It was released through Columbia Records on 25 July 2025, as the lead single from the project's fifth studio album, Deadbeat. Written and produced by Parker, the song was his first solo release in five years and his debut under Columbia.

At the 2025 ARIA Music Awards, "End Of Summer" won Best Produced Release and Best Engineered Release. At the 2026 Grammy Awards, the song won Best Dance/Electronic Recording. "End Of Summer" was voted in at number 36 on the 2025 Triple J Hottest 100.

At the APRA Music Awards of 2026, the song was shortlisted for Song of the Year.

== Background and release ==
Kevin Parker, the leader of the musical project Tame Impala, performed a then-unreleased song for the first time as part of his appearance at Primavera Sound 2025 in June 2025. The following month, he posted a series of images to social media that depicted him in several music scenarios, such as a recording studio and a DJ set. Parker captioned the post with, "Been Busy". On 23 July, a teaser video was published to Tame Impala's Twitter account with the caption, "Clear 7 minutes of your schedule." The clip follows a stranger stealing a couple's motorbike before the screen fades to reveal the song's title. In parallel, 12-inch vinyl was made available to pre-order in the project's website, backed with "Ethereal Connection" on the B-side, which additionally shared a countdown that expired on Friday, 25 July.

"End Of Summer" was released on 25 July 2025 through Columbia Records, as the first single by Tame Impala under the label. It also marked the project's first solo release since the 2020 album The Slow Rush. An accompanying music video for "End Of Summer", directed by Julian Klincewicz, premiered alongside the song.

== Composition ==
"End Of Summer" is 7 minutes and 14 seconds long. Sonically, it is an acid house, EDM, techno and Balearic house song, with elements of trance and ambient music.

== Track listing ==
All tracks are written by Kevin Parker.

No.	Title	Length
1.	"End Of Summer"	7:14
2.	"Ethereal Connection" (vinyl B-side only)	7:40
Total length:		14:54

== Charts ==
Chart performance for "End Of Summer"
Chart (2025)	Peak position
Australia Dance (ARIA)	9
Ireland (IRMA)	65
Japan Hot Overseas (Billboard Japan)	20
New Zealand Hot Singles (RMNZ)	7
UK Singles (Official Charts)	87
UK Dance (Official Charts)	17
US Bubbling Under Hot 100 (Billboard)	3
US Hot Dance/Electronic Songs (Billboard)	11
US Hot Dance/Pop Songs (Billboard)	7
US Hot Rock & Alternative Songs (Billboard)	20
