= Fcukers =

American electronic band

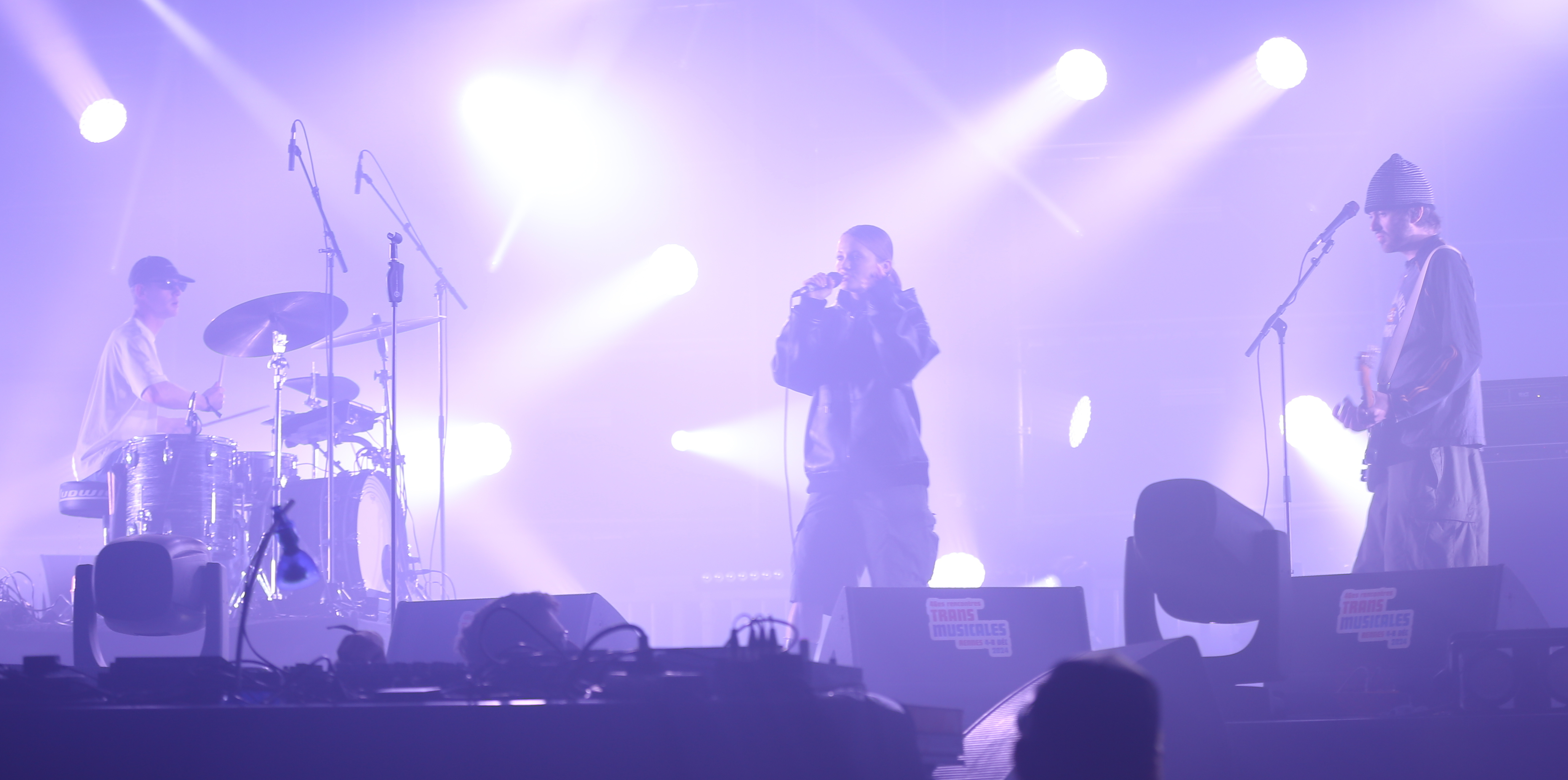
- Fcukers at the Rencontres Trans Musicales in 2024

Background information
- Origin: New York City, U.S.
- Genres: Electronic; UK garage
- Years active: 2022–present
- Label: Ninja Tune
- Spinoff of: Spud Cannon, The Shacks
- Members: Shanny Wise; Jackson Walker Lewis
- Past members: Ben Scharf

Fcukers is an American electronic band formed in New York City in 2022. It consists of Shanny Wise and Jackson Walker Lewis. In 2023, they released their debut single "Mothers". Their debut EP entitled Baggy$$ was released in 2024 through Ninja Tune's Technicolour Records imprint.

== History ==
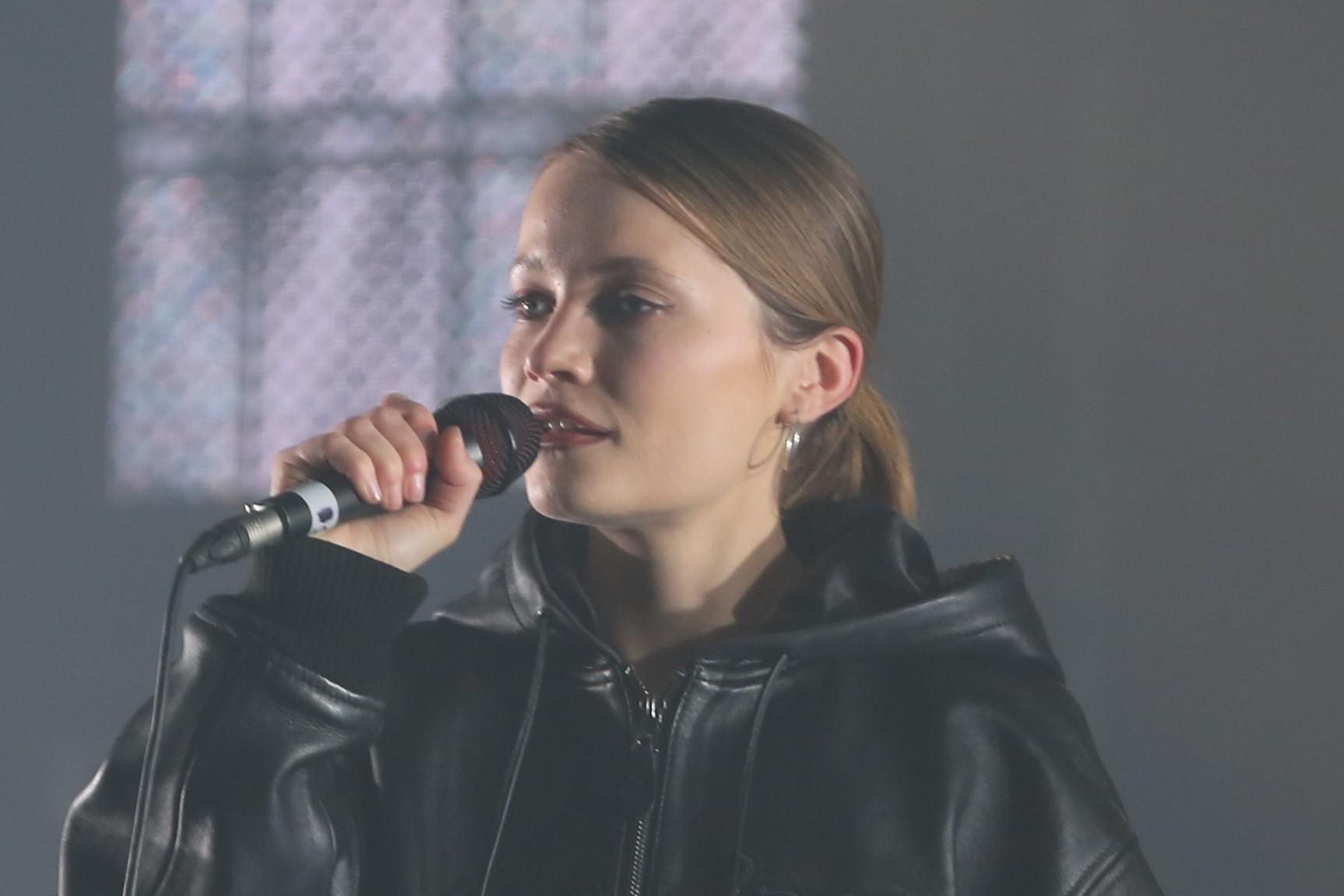
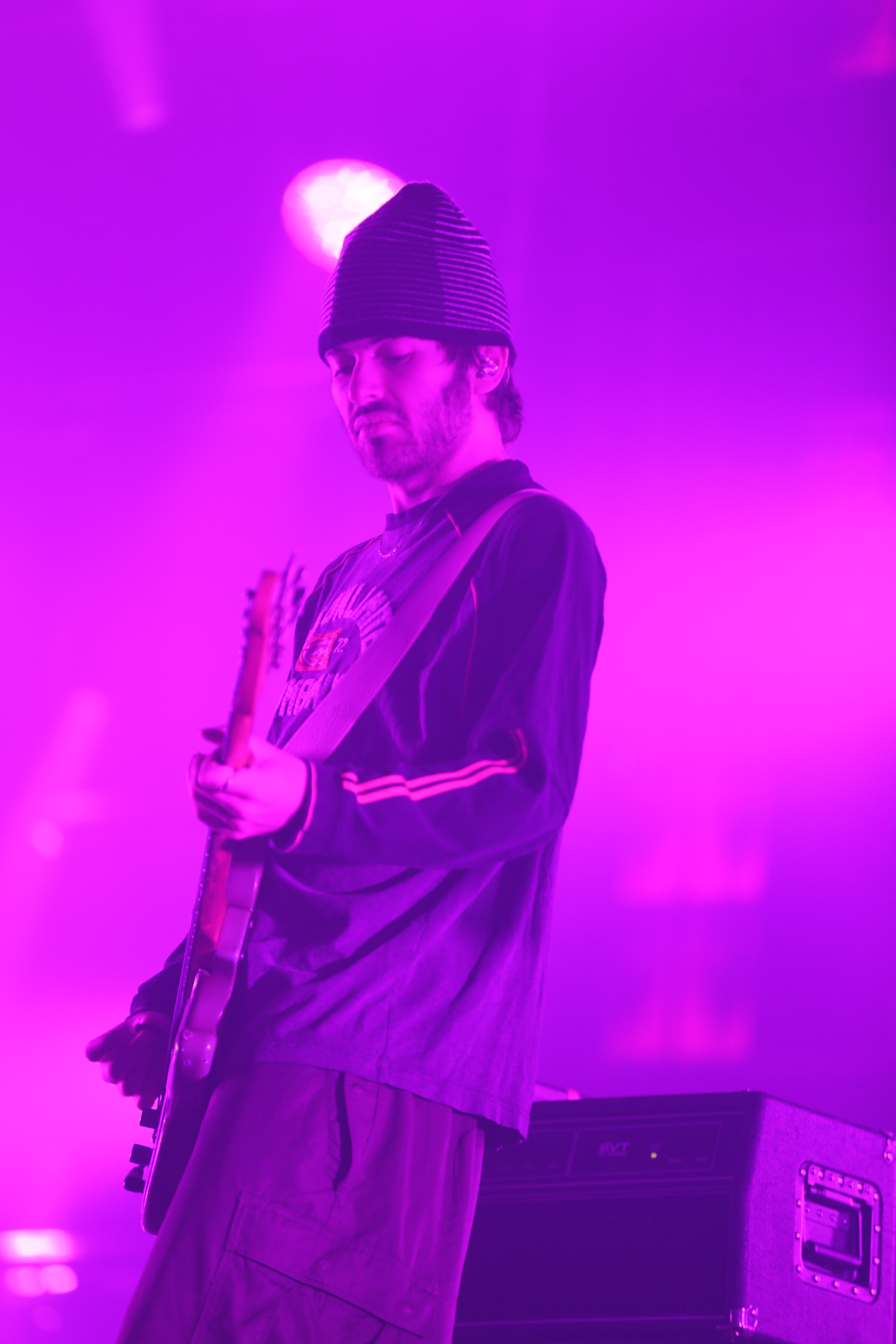
Singer Shanny Wise (top) and bassist Jackson Walker Lewis (bottom) at the Rencontres Trans Musicales in 2024

After five years with Spud Cannon, Jackson Walker Lewis and Ben Scharf decided to leave the band, seeking to move beyond what Scharf described as "some nimby kimby indie rock bullshit", which they "grew out of". By October 2022, the duo began experimenting with house music and Lewis invited vocalist Shanny Wise, former frontwoman of The Shacks. They were introduced by a mutual friend while Wise was bartending, and Lewis subsequently shared an early instrumental version of "Homie Don't Shake", which the band later developed into a full track. Wise accepted, explaining she was "over indie shit" and wanted to explore "beats or dubstep".

In March 2023, Fcukers played their debut show at Baby's All Right and released their first single, "Mothers". Later that year, they collaborated with James Murphy of LCD Soundsystem on a remix of "Los Angeles" by Lol Tolhurst, Budgie, and Jacknife Lee. By May 2024, the group signed with Ninja Tune's Technicolour Records imprint, which released their single "Bon Bon" that same month. In July, they announced their debut EP entitled Baggy$$ and released a new single, "Homie Don't Shake". The track samples Beck's 1996 song "Devils Haircut", which they had previously covered as "Devils Cut", and it was featured on Pitchfork's "11 Songs You Should Listen to Now". In August, they followed up with another single, "Tommy". Baggy$$ was officially released in September through Technicolour. In December, Fcukers released a remix of "Marmite" by Porij.

In 2025, they opened for Tame Impala on his Deadbeat Tour. Their debut album, Ö, released on March 27, 2026, through Ninja Tune. A remix EP of Ö, titled NüYork, released on July 30, 2026. Throughout 2026, they have played and are scheduled to play various concerts, including solo shows, appearances at music festivals such as Bonnaroo and Primavera Sound, and opening slots for Rüfüs Du Sol shows and Harry Styles's Together, Together tour.

== Band members ==
=== Current members ===
- Shanny Wise – vocals (2022–present)
- Jackson Walker Lewis – bass, keyboards, production (2022–present)

=== Former members ===
- Ben Scharf – drums (2022–2024)

== Awards ==
Year	Organization	Category	Recipient	Result	Ref.
2025	AIM Independent Music Awards	Best Independent EP/Mixtape	Baggy$$	Nominated	
2025	AIM Independent Music Awards	One to Watch	Fcukers	Nominated	
2026	AIM Independent Music Awards	Best Independent Album	Ö	Pending	
2026	AIM Independent Music Awards	Best Independent Track	"L.U.C.K.Y."	Pending	
2026	AIM Independent Music Awards	Independent Breakthrough	Fcukers	Pending	
2026	Beatport Awards	Best Live Performer	Fcukers	Nominated	
2025	Libera Awards	Best Dance Record	Baggy$$	Won	
2025	Libera Awards	Best Remix	"Bon Bon" (Confidence Man remix)	Nominated	
2026	Libera Awards	Best Dance Record	"I Like It Like That"	Won	

== Discography ==
Studio albums

Title	Details	Reception
Ö	Released: March 27, 2026; Format: Download, compact disc, streaming, vinyl; Label: Ninja Tune	AnyDecentMusic?: 7.3/10
Ö	Released: March 27, 2026; Format: Download, compact disc, streaming, vinyl; Label: Ninja Tune	Metacritic: 77/100

Extended plays

Title	Details
Mothers (Junior Sanchez remixes)	Released: May 12, 2023; Format: Download, streaming; Label: Brobot Records
Baggy$$	Released: September 6, 2024; Format: Download, streaming, vinyl; Label: Technicolour Records
NüYork	Released: July 30, 2026; Format: Download, streaming, vinyl; Label: Ninja Tune

Singles

Title	Year	Album
"Mothers"	2023	Non-album single
"Bon Bon"	2024	Baggy$$
"Homie Don't Shake"	2024	Baggy$$
"Tommy"	2024	Baggy$$
"Bon Bon" (Confidence Man remix)	2024	—N/a
"Bon Bon" (Andrew VanWyngarden remix)	2025	—N/a
"Play Me"	2025	Ö
"I Like It Like That"	2025	Ö
"L.U.C.K.Y"	2026	Ö
"Beatback"	2026	Ö
"If You Wanna Party, Come Over to My House"	2026	Ö
"Fcukers – Spotify Radar"	2026	—N/a
"If You Wanna Party, Come Over to My House" (Eli Escobar remix)	2026	NüYork
"Beatback" (Justin Strauss en La Piscina remix)	2026	NüYork

Remixes

Title	Year	Original artist(s)
"Los Angeles"	2023	Lol Tolhurst, Budgie, Jacknife Lee, James Murphy
"Marmite"	2024	Porij
"Summer 2000"	2025	TV Girl, George Clanton
"Real Move Touch"	2025	Confidence Man, Sweetie Irie
"Guapa"	2025	Girl Ultra
"What You Want"	2026	Angèle, Justice
"I'm Your Girl Right?"	2026	Tove Lo
"Feeling for You" (with Junior Sanchez)	2026	Cassius
"Loser"	2026	Tame Impala

Guest appearances

Title	Year	Main artist(s)	Album
"Silk Scarf"	2025	Tiga	Hotlife

Music videos

Title	Year	Director(s)	Ref.
"Bon Bon"	2024	—N/a	
"Homie Don't Shake"	2024	Shanny Wise	
"Tommy"	2024	Shanny Wise; Jackson Walker Lewis	
"UMPA"	2024	Shanny Wise	
"I Don't Wanna"	2024	Shanny Wise	
"Play Me"	2025	—N/a	
"I Like It Like That"	2025	Scott Kiernan	
"L.U.C.K.Y."	2026	Shanny Wise	
"Beatback"	2026	Shanny Wise	
"If You Wanna Party, Come Over to My House"	2026	Shanny Wise	
"Lonely"	2026	—N/a	
"Butterflies"	2026	—N/a	
