= Julian Klincewicz =

American artist, filmmaker, and photographer

- Born: August 31, 1995 (age 30); Chicago, Illinois, United States
- Occupations: Artist, filmmaker, photographer

Julian Klincewicz is an American artist, filmmaker, and photographer. His work spans fine art exhibitions, fashion and commercial film, and music videos. He has created film work for fashion houses such as Calvin Klein, Louis Vuitton, and Miu Miu, and has directed videos for artists including Beyoncé, Steve Lacy, The Kid Laroi, Girlpool, and Tame Impala.

== Early life ==
Klincewicz was born in Chicago, Illiniois. His paternal grandparents were from Poland and were exiled to Siberia; they later emigrated to Chicago, where his father, Łukasz, was born. His grandfather was born in Vilnius. His mother is from Hungary; her maiden name is Keresztes-nagy.

== Career ==
After moving from Chicago to San Diego, Klincewicz began making short videos of skateboarding in Southern California. He developed a lo-fi moving-image style early in his career, which led to commissions across fashion and music. In the midst of commissioned work, Klincewicz worked as an assistant to artist Kelsey Brookes, briefly modelled for Hedi Slimane, and performed in band Lube. In 2016, Klicewicz was next enlisted by Kanye West (via model Ian Connor) to shoot a short film of West's Yeezy Season 3 show at Madison Square Garden. In 2017, he directed a series of short films for Calvin Klein that profiled models for the brand's Spring 2017 campaign.

He subsequently worked with Virgil Abloh on moving-image pieces for Louis Vuitton menswear, including multi-phase campaign videos for the Spring–Summer 2019 collection. In 2022, Miu Miu released its Day/Night campaign featuring film directed by Klincewicz. His commercial projects have also included films for Rimowa as part of the brand's "as seen by" series.

Klincewicz's music video credits include high-profile releases for contemporary pop and indie acts, and he has contributed photography to music campaigns.

=== Exhibitions and projects ===
Klincewicz hosted his first solo art exhibition, titled Don’t Call it a Comeback, which was supported by Converse. Next, in October 2019, Dazed profiled Klincewicz around his exhibition Boys Grown Tall, shown at Swish Projects in San Diego. His photographic series Solo Tumult was presented in Japan in 2023, including at the Marc Jacobs Event Space (Shibuya PARCO) in Tokyo; the project depicts surf swells at Waimea Bay and related coastal scenes in an attempt to portray "the human quest for harmony amidst chaos".

=== Work with Beyoncé ===
Klincewicz is listed among the directors of the 2020 visual album Black Is King released by Parkwood Entertainment and Disney+. An interview profile also notes his documentary work featured in the concert film Homecoming (2019).

== Selected music videography ==
Year	Artist	Title	Role
2020	Beyoncé	"My Power"	Director (with Beyoncé)
2021	Girlpool	"Faultline"	Director (with Girlpool)
2022	Steve Lacy	"Bad Habit"	Director
2023	The Kid Laroi	"I Can't Go Back to the Way It Was (Intro)"	Director
2023	Gracie Abrams	"I Know It Won't Work"	Director
2024	Megan Thee Stallion	"Bigger in Texas"	Director (with Megan Thee Stallion)
2025	Tame Impala	"End of Summer"	Director
2025	Tame Impala	"Dracula"	Director
