= The Amity Affliction discography =

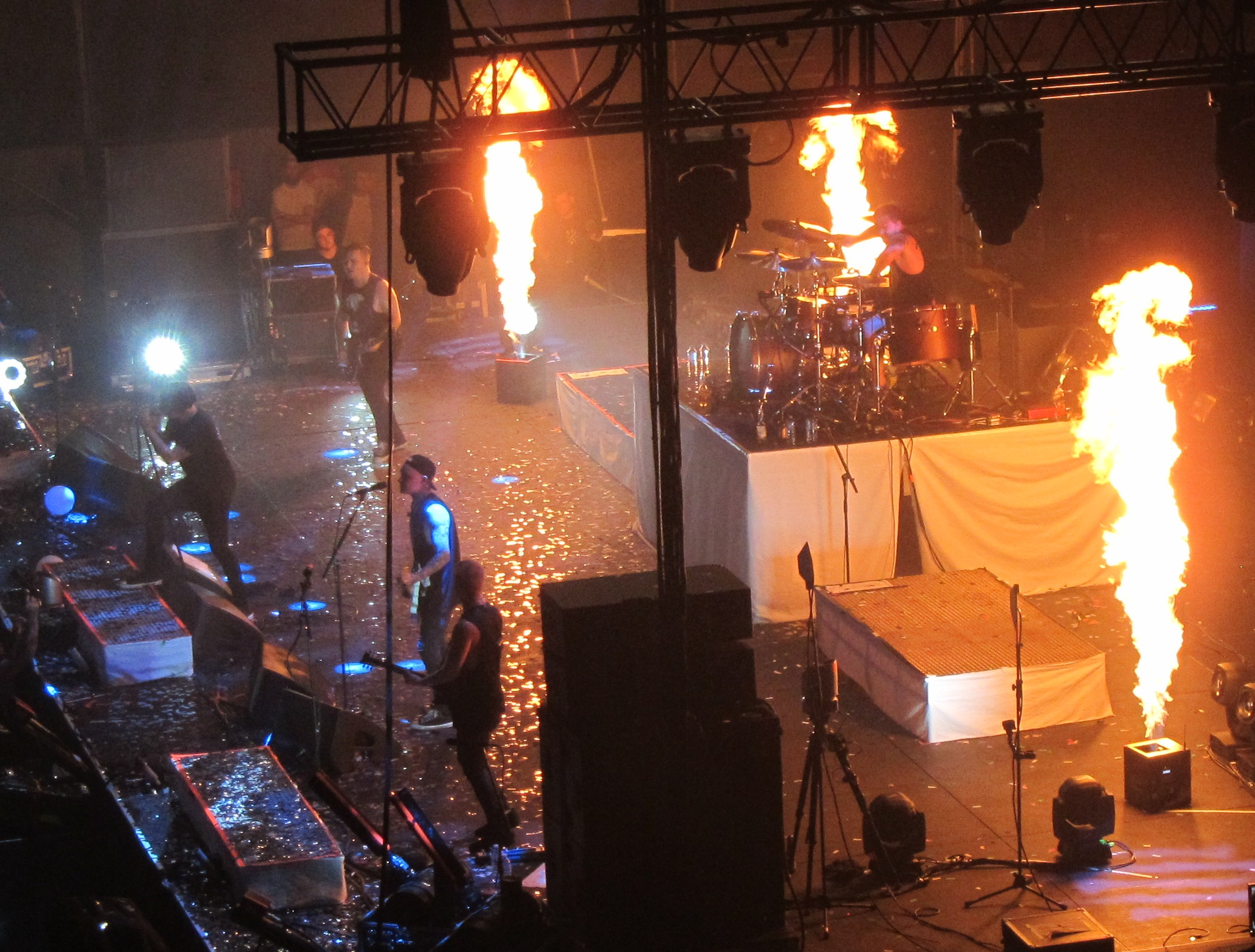
- The Amity Affliction in 2015
- Studio albums: 9
- Extended plays: 4
- Compilation albums: 1
- Singles: 29
- Music videos: 30

The Amity Affliction is an Australian post-hardcore band from Gympie, Queensland, formed in 2003. First known as (Left Lane Ends)

The band's current line-up consists of Jonathan Reeves (bass guitar, vocals), Joel Birch (vocals), Dan Brown (guitar) and Joe Longobardi (drums). The Amity Affliction have released nine studio albums: Severed Ties, released in 2008, Youngbloods in 2010 which debuted at number 6 on the ARIA Charts, and Chasing Ghosts in 2012 and Let the Ocean Take Me, both of which debuted at number 1 on the ARIA charts and went ARIA Gold, This Could Be Heartbreak in 2016, Misery in 2018, Everyone Loves You... Once You Leave Them in 2020, Not Without My Ghosts in 2023, and House of Cards in 2026.

== Albums ==
=== Studio albums ===
List of studio albums, with selected chart positions and certifications
Title	Details	Peak chart positions									Certifications
Title	Details	AUS	AUT	BEL	GER	NZ	SCO	SWI	UK	US	Certifications
Severed Ties	Released: 4 October 2008; Label: Boomtown; Formats: CD, LP, download	26	—	—	—	—	—	—	—	—	
Youngbloods	Released: 18 June 2010; Label: Boomtown; Formats: CD, LP, download	6	—	—	—	—	—	—	—	—	ARIA: Gold
Chasing Ghosts	Released: 7 September 2012; Label: UNFD/Roadrunner; Formats: CD, LP, download	1	—	—	—	—	—	—	—	—	ARIA: Gold
Let the Ocean Take Me	Released: 6 June 2014; Label: UNFD/Roadrunner; Formats: CD, LP, download	1	—	—	—	24	—	—	—	31	ARIA: Platinum
This Could Be Heartbreak	Released: 12 August 2016; Label: UNFD/Roadrunner; Formats: CD, LP, download	1	25	145	29	32	51	31	51	26	
Misery	Released: 24 August 2018; Label: UNFD/Roadrunner; Formats: CD, LP, download	1	39	154	38	—	83	51	—	70	
Everyone Loves You... Once You Leave Them	Released: 21 February 2020; Label: Warner/Pure Noise; Formats: CD, LP, download	2	—	—	47	—	53	—	—	60	
Not Without My Ghosts	Released: 12 May 2023; Label: Warner/Pure Noise; Formats: CD, LP, download	2	—	—	56	—	—	—	—	—	
House of Cards	Released: 24 April 2026; Label: Warner/Pure Noise; Formats: CD, LP, download	4	—	—	—	—	—	—	—	—	
"—" denotes a recording that did not chart or was not released in that territory.

=== Compilation albums ===
Title	Details
Glory Days	Released: 26 November 2010; Label: Boomtown; Format: CD, LP, digital download

=== Video albums ===
Title	Details	Certifications
Seems Like Forever	Released: 2015; Label: Roadrunner	ARIA: Gold

== Extended plays ==
List of extended plays
Title	Details
Early Demos	Released: 1 April 2004; Label: Self-released; Format: Digital download
The Amity Affliction	Released: 4 July 2005; Label: Modern Music; Format: CD, digital download
High Hopes	Released: 1 May 2007; Label: Skull and Bones; Format: CD, EP, digital download
Somewhere Beyond the Blue	Released: 15 December 2021; Label: Warner/Pure Noise; Format: CD, EP, digital download

== Singles ==
List of singles, with selected chart positions and certifications, showing year released and album name
Title	Year	Peak chart positions		Certifications	Album
Title	Year	AUS	US Main. Rock	Certifications	Album
"Chasing Ghosts"	2012	—	—		Chasing Ghosts
"Open Letter"	2013	—	—	ARIA: Gold	Chasing Ghosts
"Born to Die" (Lana Del Rey cover)	2013	—	—		Chasing Ghosts (Japanese version)
"Cave In"	2013	—	—		Non-album single
"Pittsburgh"	2014	28	—	ARIA: Platinum; RIAA: Gold	Let the Ocean Take Me
"Don't Lean on Me"	2014	24	—	ARIA: Gold	Let the Ocean Take Me
"The Weigh Down"	2014	—	—		Let the Ocean Take Me
"Death's Hand"	2014	—	—		Let the Ocean Take Me
"Skeletons"	2015	87	—		Let the Ocean Take Me (Deluxe)
"Farewell"	2015	109	—		Let the Ocean Take Me (Deluxe)
"Shine On"	2015	19	—		Non-album single
"I Bring the Weather with Me"	2016	53	—		This Could Be Heartbreak
"This Could Be Heartbreak"	2016	94	—	ARIA: Gold	This Could Be Heartbreak
"All Fucked Up"	2016	—	35	ARIA: Gold	This Could Be Heartbreak
"Can't Feel My Face" (The Weeknd cover)	2017	—	—		Punk Goes Pop Vol. 7
"Ivy (Doomsday)"	2018	—	—	ARIA: Gold	Misery
"Feels Like I'm Dying"	2018	—	—		Misery
"D.I.E."	2018	—	—		Misery
"Drag the Lake"	2019	—	40		Misery
"All My Friends Are Dead"	2019	—	—		Everyone Loves You... Once You Leave Them
"Soak Me in Bleach"	2020	—	37		Everyone Loves You... Once You Leave Them
"Catatonia"	2020	—	—		Everyone Loves You... Once You Leave Them
"Forever"	2020	—	—		Everyone Loves You... Once You Leave Them
"Like Love"	2021	—	—		Somewhere Beyond the Blue
"Give Up the Ghost"	2021	—	—		Somewhere Beyond the Blue
"Death Is All Around"	2021	—	—		Somewhere Beyond the Blue
"Show Me Your God"	2022	—	—		Not Without My Ghosts
"I See Dead People" (featuring Louie Knuxx)	2023	—	—		Not Without My Ghosts
"It's Hell Down Here"	2023	—	—		Not Without My Ghosts
"Not Without My Ghosts" (featuring Phem)	2023	—	—		Not Without My Ghosts
"My Father's Son" (Redux)	2024	—	—		Let The Ocean Take Me (Redux)
"All That I Remember"	2025	—	—		Non-album single
"House of Cards"	2026	—	—		House of Cards
"Bleed"	2026	—	—		House of Cards
"—" denotes a recording that did not chart or was not released in that territory.

== Music videos ==
List of music videos, showing year released and directors
Title	Year	Director(s)
"A Sleepless Winter"	2004	Mark Fahey
"Fruity Lexia"	2008	Unknown
"I Hate Hartley"	2010	Unknown
"Youngbloods"	2010	Unknown
"Chasing Ghosts"	2012	Unknown
"R.I.P. Bon"	2013	Unknown
"Open Letter"	2013	Unknown
"Greens Avenue"	2013	Unknown
"Pittsburgh"	2014	Simon Harvey Smith
"Don't Lean on Me"	2014	Simon Harvey Smith
"The Weigh Down"	2014	Simon Harvey Smith
"Death's Hand"	2014	Unknown
"Skeletons"	2015	Unknown
"Shine On"	2015	Mark Staubach
"I Bring the Weather with Me"	2016	Mark Staubach
"This Could Be Heartbreak"	2016	Mark Staubach
"All Fucked Up"	2016	Joel Birch; Ryan Mackfall
"Fight My Regret"	2017	Ryan Mackfall
"Can't Feel My Face" (The Weeknd cover)	2017	Simon Harvey Smith
"Ivy (Doomsday)"	2018	Ryan Mackfall
"Feels Like I'm Dying"	2018	Ryan Mackfall
"D.I.E."	2018	Ryan Mackfall
"Drag the Lake"	2019	Max Moore
"Soak Me in Bleach"	2020	Daniel Daly
"Forever"	2020	Carl Allison; Nick Kozakis
"Like Love"	2021	Joel Birch
"Show Me Your God"	2022	Tyson Lloyd
"I See Dead People"	2023	Daniel Daly
"It's Hell Down Here"	2023	Tomise
"Not Without My Ghosts"	2023	Daniel Daly
"All That I Remember"	2025	Daniel Daly
"House of Cards"	2026	Daniel Daly
"Bleed"	2026	Daniel Daly
"Kickboxer"	2026	Tomise

== Other appearances ==
List of album appearances
Title	Year	Album
"Poison Pen Letters"	2004	State of Affairs
"Here's to the Rotting of Rotted Memories"	2004	State of Affairs
"A Sleepless Winter"	2004	State of Affairs
"Slit the Tear Ducts"	2005	North Coast Hardcore: Volume 1
"Can't Feel My Face"	2017	Punk Goes Pop Vol. 7
"Tomorrow"	2017	Spawn (Again): A Tribute to Silverchair

== Collaborations ==
Title	Year	Album	Artist
"Doomed from Birth" (featuring Joel Birch)	2012	Hate	Thy Art Is Murder
"Set in Stones" (featuring Joel Birch)	2012	No Apologies	Heroes for Hire
"2AM" (featuring Ahren Stringer)	2012	The Construct	The Construct
"Youngbloods" (featuring Ahren Stringer)	2013	Non-album single	Illy
"Role Model" (featuring Ahren Stringer)	2013	Role Model	Bodyjar
"Lord of Bones" (featuring Ahren Stringer)	2013	An Eye for an Eye	Like Moths to Flames
"Earthwalker" (featuring Joel Birch)	2014	Earthwalker	In Hearts Wake
"51-73" (featuring Joel Birch)	2014	Life and Death	Confession
"Holy War" (featuring Ahren Stringer)	2014	Life and Death	Confession
"Haunt Me as I Roam" (featuring Ahren Stringer)	2015	Haunt Me as I Roam	Antagonist A.D
"Torch" (featuring Joel Birch)	2019	The Deathbed Sessions	Cursed Earth
"Magdalene" (featuring Ahren Stringer)	2019	Liar	She Cries Wolf
