= Ahren Stringer =

Australian singer and bassist

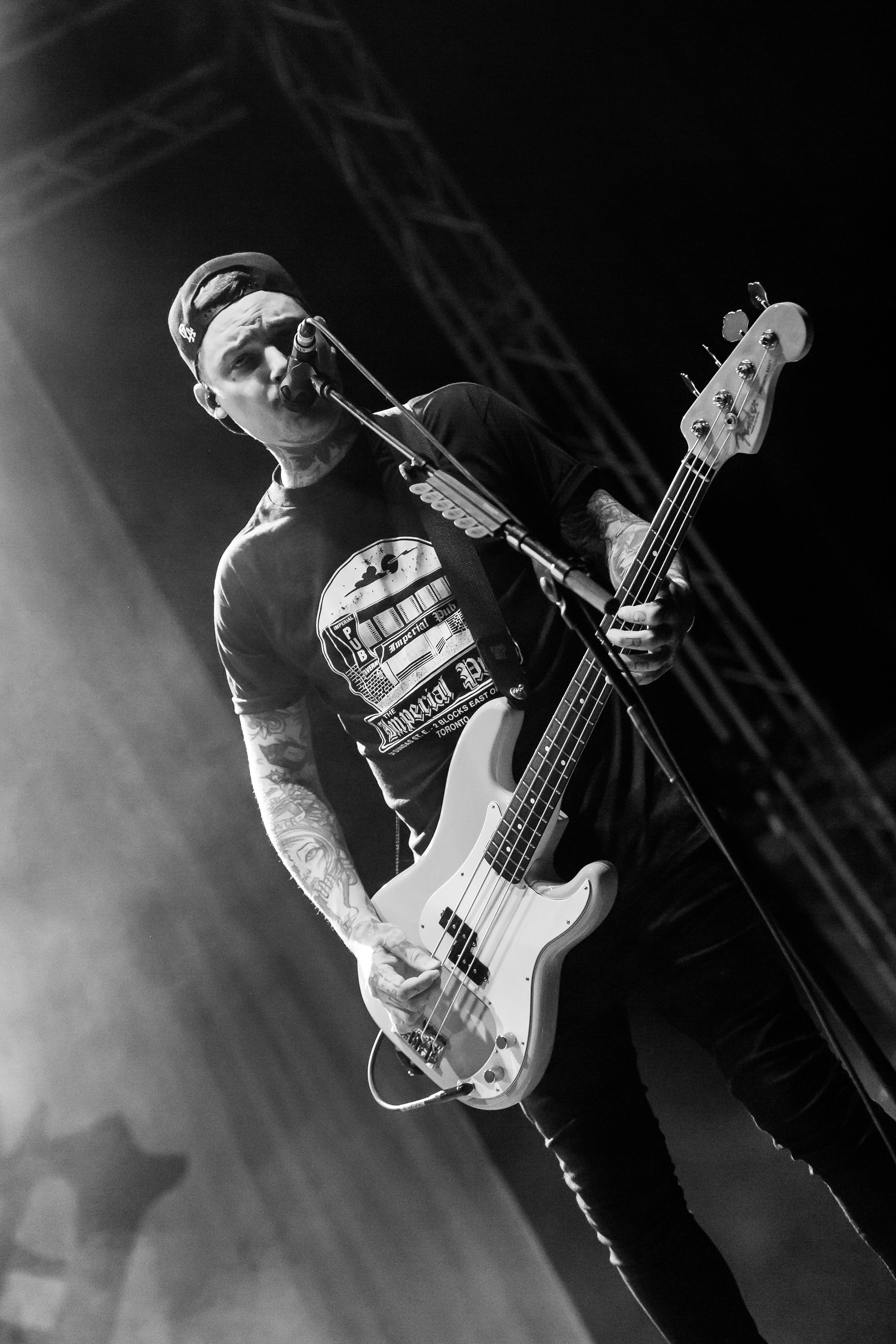
- Stringer at With Full Force 2019

Background information
- Born: 5 June 1986 (age 40); Brisbane, Queensland, Australia
- Genres: Metalcore; post-hardcore
- Occupation: Musician
- Instruments: Vocals; bass; guitar
- Member of: Self Checkout
- Formerly of: The Amity Affliction

Ahren Stringer (born 5 June 1986) is an Australian musician. He is best known as the former bassist, co-lead vocalist, and co-frontman and founding member of the Australian metalcore band the Amity Affliction and currently the bassist and clean vocalist for Self Checkout.

== Early life ==
Ahren Stringer was born on 5 June 1986 in Brisbane, Queensland. His father Mark, is a boiler maker, while his mother, Mandy, is a teacher. His early childhood was spent in Gympie Queensland. During his early years, according to Kerrang!, much of Ahren's first reflections on music was hearing Joe Cocker's "Unchain My Heart" and some of his biggest influencers were Green Day, Primus, Deep Purple, and Silverchair. One of the first songs Ahren learned to play was Deep Purple's "Smoke on the Water". During his school years in Gympie, he wasn't a model student as he was considered disruptive and despite failing music theory, he put his guitar skills to use and formed an array of bands to perform at school during lunchtime. In 2002, Stringer and Troy Brady formed Left Lane Ends as a tribute to one of their best friends, Matt Searle, who died in a car crash that same year. As their school years were ending, the band in which he helped form became a fledgling version of the Amity Affliction. They received an early gig to the infamous Brisbane venue Mary Street, where Stringer met Joel Birch for the first time. After his school years, Stringer relocated from Gympie to Brisbane and lived with his sister, Lydia Gifford, stating that he didn't have that small town mentality and while playing gigs with his band, he worked small jobs, like telemarketing, scaffolding work, and even worked at Subway.

== Music career ==
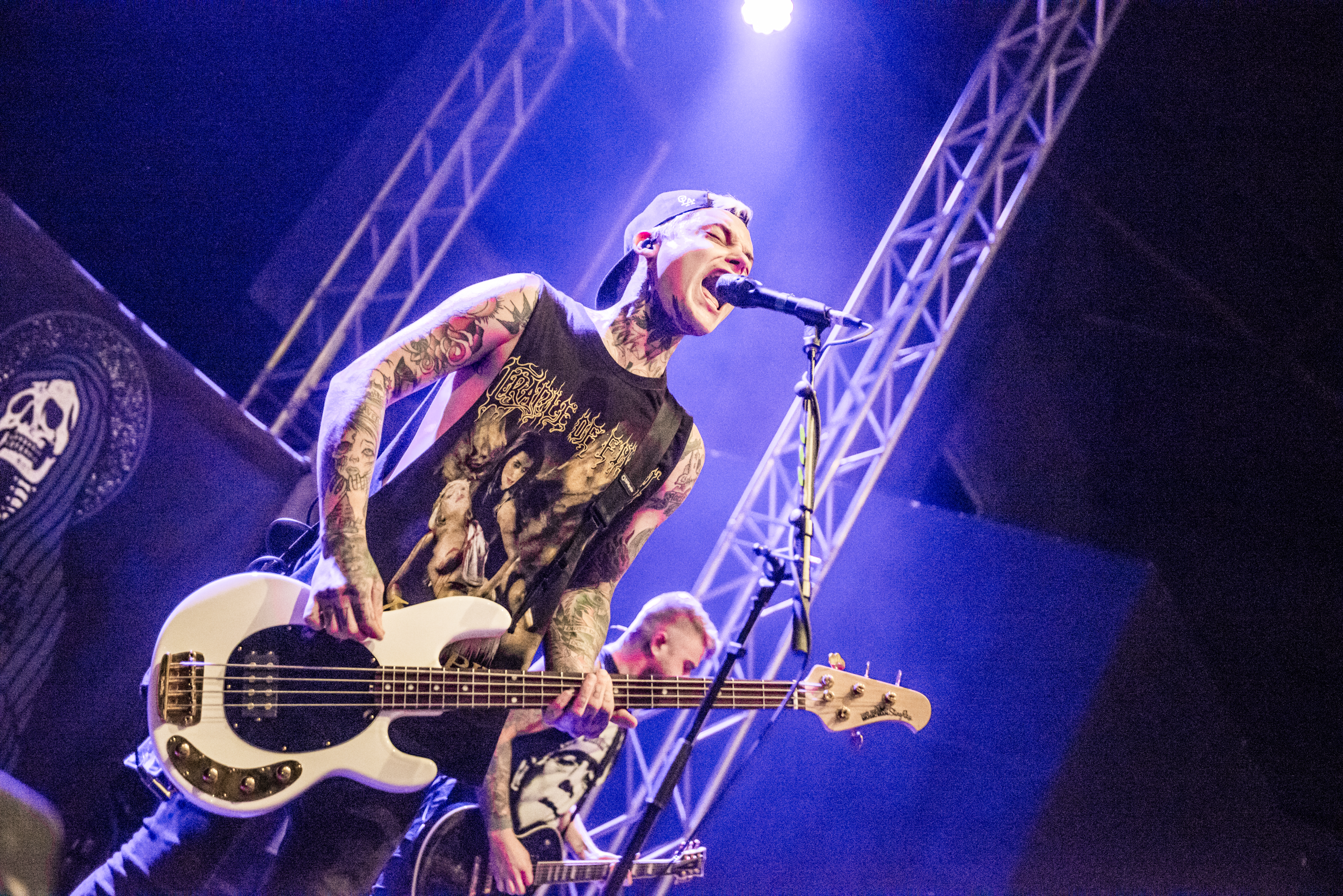
Stringer at the Impericon Never Say Die! Tour in Germany (2015)

The band formed while Stringer was in high school, whereas at the time he was performing the clean vocals and playing the guitar. In 2007, shortly after the departures of Lachlan Faulkner and Garth Buchanan, he switched to the bass guitar and the band released a five track EP entitled High Hopes. In 2008, the Amity Affliction released their first album, Severed Ties, which made its debut at No. 26 on the ARIA Albums Chart.

In 2010, they released their second album, Youngbloods. Their third album, Chasing Ghosts came forth in 2012. After the release of their fourth studio album, Let the Ocean Take Me, in 2014, the album was given a Metacritic score of 76 out of 100, indicating favorable reviews for the group. With the success of Let the Ocean Take Me, the Amity Affliction was nominated for the "Breakthrough Band of the Year" award at the 2015 Metal Hammer Golden Gods Awards, alongside other bands like Halestorm, Bury Tomorrow, and In This Moment, but came up short against Babymetal. In 2016, they released their fifth album, This Could Be Heartbreak. Two years down the road in 2018, their sixth album, Misery, was released. Their seventh album, Everyone Loves You... Once You Leave Them, was released in early 2020. Their eighth and latest album, Not Without My Ghosts, was released in 2023.

For some musicians and bands, Ahren Stringer has made a guest appearance. In 2013, he was a guest singer in Illy's "Youngbloods". In 2019, Ahren Stringer was welcomed on as a guest vocalist for Australian band She Cries Wolf in their song "Magdelene".

== Post Amity, Self Checkout, and Legal Issues ==
In February of 2025, Stringer was released from The Amity Affliction in which his bandmates cited "certain behaviours" they didn't tolerate. Though Stringer denied said allegations, he moved on from the band. He got married and worked with former Volumes vocalist Gus "Yung Yogi" Farias on their new project "Self Checkout" during which they dropped a few tracks, including "I Love Lucy", named in recognition of Stringers wife, Lucy. Later that year, Stringer was charged with dangerous driving and refusing to submit to an alcohol and drug test. Stringer pleaded guilty and had his driver's license cancelled and fined as a result.

== Personal life ==
Stringer is currently married to his wife, Lucy. Aside from being the bassist and clean vocalist for Self Checkout, he is also a stylised traditional tattoo flash artist to imprint on skin and paper. After being off tour due to the COVID-19 pandemic, Stringer used that time to stylize some inkwork using lyrics from the bands Somewhere Beyond the Blue EP.

Stringer faced some backlash over an Instagram post revealing a photo of a police funeral with a caption that read, "Freedom grows when cops get planted. Plant a freedom seed today." Some viewers saw that a call for violence against cops and even received some death threats against him. Stringer later opened up about his post on Twitter and revealed his bad experience with the police in Brisbane. Stringer made it clear he was no fan of cops as he took it a step further after the Instagram controversy. In his earlier days, in an interview with Metal Hammer, Stringer admitted to having many brushes with the law. In the article, he requested his body be cremated, then for someone to carry his ashes, trip, and 'accidently' toss his ashes in a police officers face.

== Discography ==
=== The Amity Affliction ===
Studio albums

- Severed Ties (2008)
- Youngbloods (2010)
- Chasing Ghosts (2012)
- Let the Ocean Take Me (2014)
- This Could Be Heartbreak (2016)
- Misery (2018)
- Everyone Loves You... Once You Leave Them (2020)
- Not Without My Ghosts (2023)

=== Self Checkout ===
Singles

- Death Notes
- I Love Lucy
- A League of Their Own
- Manchester by the Sea

== Collaborations ==
Year	Song	Album	Artist
2012	"2AM" (featuring Ahren Stringer)	The Construct	The Construct
2013	"Youngbloods" (featuring Ahren Stringer)	Non-album single	Illy
2013	"Role Model" (featuring Ahren Stringer)	Role Model	Bodyjar
2013	"Lord of Bones" (featuring Ahren Stringer)	An Eye for an Eye	Like Moths to Flames
2014	"Holy War" (featuring Ahren Stringer)	Life and Death	Confession
2015	"Haunt Me as I Roam" (featuring Ahren Stringer)	Haunt Me as I Roam	Antagonist A.D
2019	"Magdalene" (featuring Ahren Stringer)	Liar	She Cries Wolf
