= ARIA Award for Best Hard Rock or Heavy Metal Album =

Annual Australian music industry award

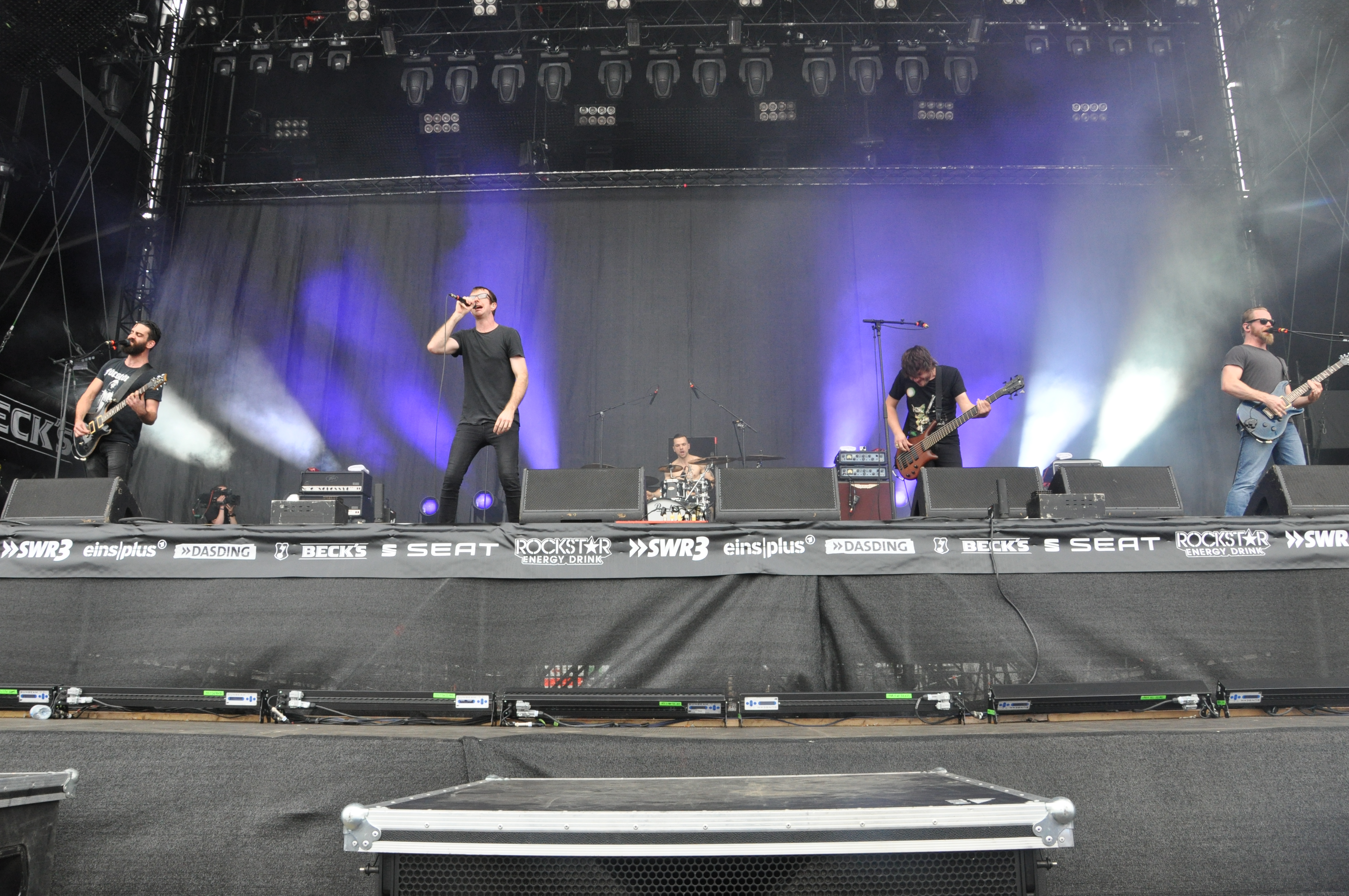
- 2026 winner Karnivool
- Country: Australia
- Presented by: Australian Recording Industry Association (ARIA)
- First award: 2010
- Currently held by: Karnivool, In Verses (2026)

Highlights
- Most wins: Northlane (3)
- Most nominations: The Amity Affliction (7)
- Website: ariaawards.com.au

The ARIA Music Award for Best Hard Rock or Heavy Metal Album, is an award presented at the annual ARIA Music Awards, which recognises "the many achievements of Aussie artists across all music genres", since 1987. It is handed out by the Australian Recording Industry Association (ARIA), an organisation whose aim is "to advance the interests of the Australian record industry." To be eligible, the recording must be an album in the hard rock or heavy metal genres, and cannot be entered in other genre categories. The accolade is voted for by a judging school, which comprises between 40 and 100 members of representatives experienced in this genre, and is given to a solo artist or group who is either from Australia or an Australian resident.

The award for Best Hard Rock or Heavy Metal Album was first presented to Parkway Drive in 2010, for Deep Blue; they won the award again in 2018 for Reverence. The Amity Affliction (2010, 2013, 2014, 2016, 2020, 2023 and 2025) have received the most nominations in this category, with a total of 7 nominations, though they have never won. Northlane has the most awards in this category with 3 awards from 4 nominations.

== Winners and nominees ==
In the following table, the winner is highlighted in a separate colour, and in boldface; the nominees are those that are not highlighted or in boldface.

Winner marked in a separate colour

Year	Winner(s)	Album/single title
**2010** (24th)
**2010** (24th)	**Parkway Drive**	**Deep Blue**
**2010** (24th)	Airbourne	No Guts. No Glory.
**2010** (24th)	The Amity Affliction	Youngbloods
**2010** (24th)	Dead Letter Circus	This Is the Warning
**2010** (24th)	Violent Soho	Violent Soho
**2011** (25th)
**2011** (25th)	**Front End Loader**	**Ritardando**
**2011** (25th)	Coerce	Ethereal Surrogate Saviour
**2011** (25th)	Cosmic Psychos	Glorious Basterds
**2011** (25th)	Dream On, Dreamer	Heartbound
**2011** (25th)	Floating Me	Floating Me
**2012** (26th)
**2012** (26th)	**DZ Deathrays**	**Bloodstreams**
**2012** (26th)	Buried in Verona	Notorious
**2012** (26th)	Frenzal Rhomb	Smoko at the Pet Food Factory
**2012** (26th)	sleepmakeswaves	... and so we destroyed everything
**2012** (26th)	House vs. Hurricane	Crooked Teeth
**2013** (27th)
**2013** (27th)	**Karnivool**	**Asymmetry**
**2013** (27th)	Airbourne	Black Dog Barking
**2013** (27th)	Northlane	Singularity
**2013** (27th)	The Amity Affliction	Chasing Ghosts
**2013** (27th)	Thy Art Is Murder	Hate
**2014** (28th)
**2014** (28th)	**DZ Deathrays**	**Black Rat**
**2014** (28th)	High Tension	Death Beat
**2014** (28th)	Shihad	FVEY
**2014** (28th)	sleepmakeswaves	Love of Cartography
**2014** (28th)	The Amity Affliction	Let the Ocean Take Me
**2015** (29th)
**2015** (29th)	**Northlane**	**Node**
**2015** (29th)	Born Lion	Final Words
**2015** (29th)	In Hearts Wake	Skydancer
**2015** (29th)	King Parrot	Dead Set
**2015** (29th)	Thy Art Is Murder	Holy War
**2016** (30th)
**2016** (30th)	**King Gizzard & the Lizard Wizard**	**Nonagon Infinity**
**2016** (30th)	Hellions	Opera Oblivia
**2016** (30th)	Parkway Drive	Ire
**2016** (30th)	The Amity Affliction	This Could Be Heartbreak
**2016** (30th)	Twelve Foot Ninja	Outlier
**2017** (31st)
**2017** (31st)	**Northlane**	**Mesmer**
**2017** (31st)	Airbourne	Breakin' Outta Hell
**2017** (31st)	Frenzal Rhomb	Hi-Vis High Tea
**2017** (31st)	King Gizzard & the Lizard Wizard	Murder of the Universe
**2017** (31st)	sleepmakeswaves	Made of Breath Only
**2018** (32nd)
**2018** (32nd)	**Parkway Drive**	**Reverence**
**2018** (32nd)	DZ Deathrays	Bloody Lovely
**2018** (32nd)	King Parrot	Ugly Produce
**2018** (32nd)	Polaris	The Mortal Coil
**2018** (32nd)	West Thebarton	Different Beings Being Different
**2019** (33rd)
**2019** (33rd)	**Northlane**	**Alien**
**2019** (33rd)	Clowns	Nature/Nurture
**2019** (33rd)	Dead Letter Circus	Dead Letter Circus
**2019** (33rd)	DZ Deathrays	Positive Rising: Part 1
**2019** (33rd)	King Gizzard & the Lizard Wizard	Infest the Rats' Nest
**2020** (34th)
**2020** (34th)	**King Gizzard & the Lizard Wizard**	**Chunky Shrapnel**
**2020** (34th)	Parkway Drive	Viva the Underdogs
**2020** (34th)	Polaris	The Death of Me
**2020** (34th)	The Amity Affliction	Everyone Loves You... Once You Leave Them
**2020** (34th)	The Chats	High Risk Behaviour
**2021** (35th)
**2021** (35th)	**Tropical Fuck Storm**	**Deep States**
**2021** (35th)	A. Swayze & the Ghosts	Paid Salvation
**2021** (35th)	Alpha Wolf	A Quiet Place to Die
**2021** (35th)	Psychedelic Porn Crumpets	Shyga! The Sunlight Mound
**2021** (35th)	Yours Truly	Self Care
**2022** (36th)
**2022** (36th)	**The Chats**	**Get Fucked**
**2022** (36th)	Dune Rats	Real Rare Whale
**2022** (36th)	Northlane	Obsidian
**2022** (36th)	Shihad	Old Gods
**2022** (36th)	Thornhill	Heroine
**2023** (37th)
**2023** (37th)	**Parkway Drive**	**Darker Still**
**2023** (37th)	DZ Deathrays	R.I.F.F
**2023** (37th)	King Gizzard & the Lizard Wizard	PetroDragonic Apocalypse; or, Dawn of Eternal Night: An Annihilation of Planet Earth...
**2023** (37th)	The Amity Affliction	Not Without My Ghosts
**2023** (37th)	These New South Whales	TNSW
**2024** (38th)
**2024** (38th)	**Speed**	**Only One Mode**
**2024** (38th)	C.O.F.F.I.N	Australia Stops
**2024** (38th)	Dune Rats	If It Sucks, Turn It Up
**2024** (38th)	Polaris	Fatalism
**2024** (38th)	Teenage Jones	The Rot That Grows Inside My Chest
**2025** (39th)
**2025** (39th)	**Thornhill**	**Bodies**
**2025** (39th)	Civic	Chrome Dipped
**2025** (39th)	Press Club	To All The Ones That I Love
**2025** (39th)	RedHook	Mutation
**2025** (39th)	The Amity Affliction	Let the Ocean Take Me Down (Redux)
**2026** (40th)
**2026** (40th)	**Karnivool**	**In Verses**
**2026** (40th)	Cosmic Psychos	I Really Like Beer
**2026** (40th)	DZ Deathrays	Easing Out of Control
**2026** (40th)	These New South Whales	Godspeed
**2026** (40th)	Waax	Angel's Mess

== Artists with multiple wins ==
3 wins

- Northlane

2 wins

- DZ Deathrays
- Karnivool
- King Gizzard & the Lizard Wizard
- Parkway Drive

== Artists with multiple nominations ==
7 nominations

- The Amity Affliction

6 nominations

- DZ Deathrays

5 nominations

- King Gizzard & the Lizard Wizard
- Northlane
- Parkway Drive

3 nominations

- Airbourne
- Polaris
- sleepmakeswaves

2 nominations

- The Chats
- Cosmic Psychos
- Dead Letter Circus
- Dune Rats
- Frenzal Rhomb
- Karnivool
- King Parrot
- Shihad
- These New South Whales
- Thornhill
- Thy Art Is Murder
