= High Hopes =

High Hopes may refer to:

== Film and television ==
- High Hopes (1988 film), a 1988 British film
- High Hopes (2006 film), a 2005 U.S. film
- High Hopes (American TV series)
- High Hopes (British TV series), a British situation comedy
- High Hopes (Canadian TV series), a Canadian soap opera

== Music ==
=== Albums and EPs ===
- High Hopes (album), a 2014 album by Bruce Springsteen, or its title song (see below)
- High Hopes (EP), a 2007 EP by The Amity Affliction

=== Songs ===
- "High Hopes" (Frank Sinatra song), 1959
- "High Hopes" (The S.O.S. Band song), 1982
- "High Hopes" (Tim Scott McConnell song), 1987
- "High Hopes" (Pink Floyd song), 1994
- "High Hopes" (Kodaline song), 2013
- "High Hopes" (Panic! at the Disco song), 2018
- "High Hopes", a song by Sammy Hagar from Unboxed
- "High Hopes", a song by Neil Halstead from Sleeping on Roads
