= Snicklefritz =

Snicklefritz may refer to:

- "Snicklefritz", a song by the Amity Affliction from Chasing Ghosts, 2012
- Snicklefritz, a cat character on the TV series The Big Comfy Couch

== See also ==
- The Schnickelfritz Band, a comedy musical group featured in the 1938 film Gold Diggers in Paris
