= Cancer (Confession album) =

Studio album by Confession
- Released: 9 October 2009
- Recorded: June–September 2009
- Studio: Sound House Studio, Adelaide, Australia
- Genre: Metalcore
- Length: 37:15
- Label: Resist

Confession chronology
Can't Live, Can't Breathe (2008)	Cancer (2009)	The Long Way Home (2011)

Cancer is the first full-length studio album by Australian metalcore band Confession, released in October 2009, through Resist Records.

The album was recorded at Sound House Studio in Adelaide, Australia and mixed by Roman Koester (The Red Shore guitarist) in Melbourne.

== Track listing ==
All lyrics are written by Michael Crafter; all music is composed by Confession

No.	Title	Length
1.	"Intro"	1:26
2.	"Send a Meat Truck"	3:17
3.	"Must've Cut His Heart Out"	3:02
4.	"Anarchy Road"	3:06
5.	"That Scag and His Floozie, They're Gonna Die"	3:04
6.	"That's Not the Goose" (featuring JJ Peters of Deez Nuts)	2:59
7.	"I Am the Nightrider"	3:14
8.	"The Bitch Is Born to Run" (featuring Winston McCall of Parkway Drive)	2:57
9.	"Cundalini Wants His Hand Back!"	3:56
10.	"She's Not What She Seems"	2:50
11.	"Chewed Up and Spat Out" (featuring Ahren Stringer of The Amity Affliction)	3:26
12.	"People Don't Believe in Heroes Anymore"	3:58
Total length:		37:15

== Personnel ==
- Michael Crafter – lead vocals
- Dan Brown – lead guitar, bass, clean vocals
- Adam Harris – rhythm guitar
- Marcus Daniele – drums, percussion

== Charts ==
Chart (2009)	Peak position
Australian Albums (ARIA Charts)	69
