= Glory Days =

Glory Days or Glory Daze may refer to:

== Art, entertainment, and media ==
=== Films ===
- Glory Days (1988), a TV movie starring Robert Conrad and Pamela Gidley
- Glory Daze (film) (1996), an American film
- Glory Daze: The Life and Times of Michael Alig (2015), a biographical crime documentary film about Michael Alig and his Club Kids
- an alternate title for the 1976 film Goldenrod

=== Music ===
- Glory Days (Little Mix album), 2016
- Glory Days (The Amity Affliction album), 2010
- "Glory Days" (Just Jack song)
- "Glory Days" (Bruce Springsteen song)
- "Glory Days" (Gabby Barrett song)

=== Television ===
- Glory Days (1990 TV series), a 1990 American drama series
- Glory Days (2002 TV series), a 2002 American mystery series
- Glory Daze (2010 TV series), a 2010 American comedy-drama series

=== Other art, entertainment, and media ===
- Glory Days (audio drama), a Doctor Who spin-off audio drama
- Glory Days (musical), a 2008 Broadway show
- Super Army War (2005), a Game Boy Advance game titled Glory Days: The Essence of War in Europe

== See also ==
- Days of Glory, films
