= Life and Death (album) =

Studio album by Confession
- Released: 13 June 2014
- Recorded: February 2014, at Lambesis Studios, San Diego, California
- Genre: Metalcore, melodic metalcore
- Length: 32:36
- Label: Lifeforce
- Producer: Dan Castleman

Confession chronology
The Long Way Home (2011)	Life and Death (2014)

Life And Death is the third full-length studio album by Australian metalcore band Confession, released on 13 June 2014, through Lifeforce Records. This is the first album to feature the lineup of guitarists Russell Holland and Lyndsay Antica, bassist Steven French, and drummer Jake Dargaville, following the departure of guitarists Dan Brown and Adam Harris, bassist Tim Anderson and drummer Shane O'Brien, leaving Michael Crafter as the only original member.

The album was recorded with Dan Castleman at Lambesis Studios in San Diego, California, in February 2014.

== Track listing ==
All lyrics are written by Michael Crafter; all music is composed by Confession

No.	Title	Length
1.	"Life"	0:55
2.	"Still Breathing"	2:31
3.	"Holy War" (feat. Ahren Stringer of The Amity Affliction)	2:50
4.	"Hollow"	3:36
5.	"Fuck Cancer"	3:15
6.	"March 23"	4:02
7.	"Old Blood" (feat. Adrian Fitipaldes of Northlane)	2:59
8.	"51-73" (feat. Joel Birch of The Amity Affliction)	3:19
9.	"Fear" (feat. Karl Schubach of Misery Signals)	3:16
10.	"The Forgotten"	2:42
11.	"Death"	3:11
Total length:		32:36

== Personnel ==
- Michael Crafter - lead vocals
- Russell Holland - guitar
- Lyndsay Antica - guitar
- Steven French - bass
- Jake Dargaville - drums, percussion
- Daniel Castleman - production, engineering, mixing
- Randy Slaugh - string arrangements, gang vocals, engineering

== Charts ==
Chart (2014)	Peak position
Australian Albums (ARIA Charts)	19
