= Born Lion =

Australian musical group

- Origin: Sydney, Australia
- Genres: Punk rock, hardcore punk, art punk, alternative rock
- Years active: 2012–present
- Members: John Bowker; Red; Nathan Mulholland; Andres Hyde
- Past members: Dave Murphy

Born Lion are an Australian band based in Sydney that formed in 2012. Their Final Words album was nominated for a 2015 ARIA Award for Best Hard Rock/Heavy Metal Album. Their album Celebrate the Lie was released in early 2018.

Born Lion signed to FOUR FOUR, an imprint of ABC Music, in March 2015.

== Band members ==
- John Bowker
- Red
- Nathan Mulholland
- Dave Murphy
- Andres Hyde

== Discography ==
=== Albums ===
| Title | Album details |
|---|---|
| Final Words | Released: 2015; Label: Four/Four (BL001); Format: CD, LP, digital |
| Celebrate the Lie | Released: 2018; Label: ABC Music (6704128); Format: CD, digital |

=== Extended Plays ===
| Title | EP details |
|---|---|
| Born Lion | Released: 2013; Label: Born Lion (BLEP001); Format: CD, digital |

== Awards and nominations ==
=== ARIA Music Awards ===
The ARIA Music Awards are a set of annual ceremonies presented by Australian Recording Industry Association (ARIA), which recognise excellence, innovation, and achievement across all genres of the music of Australia. They commenced in 1987.

| Year | Nominee / work | Award | Result | Ref. |
|---|---|---|---|---|
| 2015 | Final Words | Best Hard Rock/Heavy Metal Album | Nominated | |
