= Days of Glory =

Days of Glory may refer to:

- Days of Glory (1944 film), a World War II film starring Tamara Toumanova and Gregory Peck
- Giorni di gloria (Days of Glory), a 1945 Italian documentary about the World War II Ardeatine massacre, directed by Giuseppe De Santis, Mario Serandrei, Marcello Pagliero and Luchino Visconti
- Days of Glory (2006 film) (Indigènes), directed by Rachid Bouchareb

== See also ==
- Glory Days (disambiguation)
