= The Long Way Home (Confession album) =

Studio album by Confession
- Released: 23 September 2011
- Recorded: 18–29 April 2011, at Studio Fredman, Gothenburg, Sweden
- Genre: Metalcore
- Length: 32:00
- Label: Resist
- Producer: Fredrik Nordström

Confession chronology
Cancer (2009)	The Long Way Home (2011)	Life and Death (2014)

The Long Way Home is the second full-length studio album by Australian metalcore band Confession, released on 23 September 2011, through Resist Records. This is the last album to feature guitarists Dan Brown and Adam Harris, bassist Tim Anderson and drummer Shane O'Brien, leaving Michael Crafter as the only original member.

The album was recorded with famed Swedish producer Fredrik Nordström (In Flames, Bring Me the Horizon, At the Gates, Opeth) at his Studio Fredman in Gothenburg, Sweden, in April 2011.

== Track listing ==
All lyrics are written by Michael Crafter; all music is composed by Confession.

No.	Title	Length
1.	"Intro"	1:01
2.	"Confused/Hopeless"	2:31
3.	"I Created This Horror"	2:19
4.	"Piece by Piece"	2:29
5.	"Asthma Attack"	2:43
6.	"Gimme A.D.D"	3:06
7.	"Nearly 30"	3:22
8.	"Die to Live"	3:18
9.	"The True Shine Through"	2:30
10.	"Heartless"	4:04
11.	"The Long Way Home"	4:12
Total length:		31:35

== Personnel ==
- Michael Crafter – lead vocals
- Dan Brown – guitar, clean vocals
- Adam Harris – guitar
- Tim Anderson – bass
- Shane O'Brien – drums, percussion

== Charts ==
Chart (2011)	Peak position
Australian Albums (ARIA Charts)	47
