= Coerce (band) =

Australian post-hardcore band

- Origin: Melbourne, Victoria, Australia Adelaide, South Australia, Australia
- Genre: Post-hardcore
- Label: Capitalgames
- Members: Mike Deslandes; Matthew Adey; Karl Roberts; Justin Bond

Coerce is a post-hardcore band originally from Adelaide, South Australia, and now reside in Melbourne, Victoria. In 2009 Coerce released their debut album Silver Tongued Life Licker and were a Triple J Next Crop artist.

Their second album, Ethereal Surrogate Saviour, was nominated for Best Hard Rock/Heavy Metal Album at the ARIA Music Awards of 2011. The band toured Australia extensively during the most active years of 2009-2012 supporting Russian Circles, Graf Orlock, Dangers, Robotosaurus and played the Big Day Out in Adelaide in 2010.

== Band members ==
- Mike Deslandes
- Matthew Adey
- Karl Roberts
- Justin Bond

== Discography ==
=== Studio albums ===
Title	Details
Silver Tongued Life Licker	Released: June 2009; Label: Capitalgames (CGC03); Format: CD, LP, digital download
Ethereal Surrogate Saviour	Released: June 2011; Label: Capitalgames (CGC013); Format: CD, digital download

=== Extended plays ===
Title	Details
Self titled EP	Released: 2008; Label: Capitalgames (CGC02); Format: CD, digital download
Coerce/Robotosaurus split	Released: August 2010; Label: Capitalgames; Format: digital download
Genome	Released: October 2012; Label: Capitalgames (CGC016); Format: LP

== Awards ==
=== ARIA Music Awards ===
The ARIA Music Awards is an annual awards ceremony that recognises excellence, innovation, and achievement across all genres of Australian music. Coerce have been nominated for one award.

Year	Nominee / work	Award	Result
2011	Ethereal Surrogate Saviour	Best Hard Rock or Heavy Metal Album	Nominated

=== Fowler's Live Music Awards ===
The Fowler's Live Music Awards took place from 2012 to 2014 to "recognise success and achievement over the past 12 months [and] celebrate the great diversity of original live music" in South Australia. Since 2015 they're known as the South Australian Music Awards.

Year	Nominee / work	Award	Result (wins only)
2012	Coerce	Best Punk Artist	Won
