= Clowns (band) =

Australian punk band

- Origin: Melbourne, Victoria, Australia
- Genre: Hardcore punk
- Years active: 2009–present
- Labels: Damaged; Poison City; This Charming Man; Fat Wreck Chords
- Members: Stevie Williams; Jake Laderman; Jarrod Goon; Cam Rust; Hanny Tilbrook
- Past members: Joe Hansen; James Ahern; Will Robinson
- Website: https://clownsband.com

Clowns are an Australian punk rock band from Melbourne, Victoria, formed in 2009. The band have released five studio albums to date: I'm Not Right (2013), Bad Blood (2015), Lucid Again (2017), Nature / Nurture (2019) and Endless (2023). Nature/Nurture saw them nominated for the 2019 ARIA Award for Best Hard Rock or Heavy Metal Album.

== Members ==
Current members

- Stevie Williams – lead vocals (2009–present)
- Jake Laderman – drums (2009–present)
- Jarrod Goon – guitar (2015–present)
- Hanny Tilbrook – bass, backing vocals (2016–present)
- Cameron Rust – guitar (2021–present)

Former members

- Joe Hansen – guitar (2009–2015)
- James Ahern – bass (2009–2016)
- Will Robinson – guitar (2016–2021), bass (2016)

== Discography ==
=== Studio albums ===
List of albums, with selected chart positions
Title	Album details	Peak chart positions
Title	Album details	AUS
I'm Not Right	Released: 10 October 2013; Label: Poison City (PCR072); Format: CD, vinyl, digital download	—
Bad Blood	Released: 20 February 2015; Label: Poison City (PCR102); Format: CD, vinyl, digital download	—
Lucid Again	Released: 12 May 2017; Label: Poison City (PCR135); Format: Digital download, CD, vinyl	—
Nature/Nurture	Released: 12 April 2019; Label: Damaged (DRC-001); Format: CD, vinyl, digital download	31
Endless	Scheduled: 20 October 2023; Label: Damaged; Format: CD, vinyl, digital download	36

=== EPs ===
List of EPs, with selected chart positions
Title	EP details	Peak chart positions
Title	EP details	AUS
Clowns EP	Released: 2010; Label: Clowns; Format: CD, digital download	—
