= Endless (Clowns album) =

Studio album by Clowns
- Released: 20 October 2023
- Recorded: 2020–2022
- Genres: Hardcore punk; crossover thrash; thrash metal; speed metal
- Length: 39:28
- Labels: Damaged; Fat Wreck Chords

Clowns chronology
Nature/Nurture (2019)	Endless (2023)

Singles from Endless
- 1. "Formaldehyde" Released: 12 June 2023; 2. "Bisexual Awakening" Released: 11 July 2023; 3. "Thanks 4 Nothing" Released: 8 August 2023; 4. "Death Wish" Released: 6 September 2023; 5. "A Widow's Son" Released: 16 September 2023; 6. "Z3r0s&0n3s" Released: 3 October 2023

Endless is the fifth studio album by Australian hardcore punk band, Clowns. The album was released on 20 October 2023 through Damaged Records and Fat Wreck Chords.

== Style and composition ==
The album has been described by the band's hardcore punk sound, but as also been noted in incorporate elements of crossover thrash, thrash metal, and speed metal.

== Critical reception ==
Professional ratings
Review scores
Source	Rating
Hysteria	9/10
New Noise	5/5 stars
ThePunkSite.com	4/5 stars
Wall of Sound Australia	8/10

Endless was well received by contemporary music critics upon release. Karina Sevig, writing for New Noise Magazine gave Endless a perfect five-star rating praising the direction and sound of the band, and the production. Summarizing the album, Selvig said the album "is undoubtedly the beginning of a new chapter that they have worked their butts off to finesse. Tilbrook and Williams splitting the vocals on this album is a direction that will pay off if they continue working together like they have done on ENDLESS. But what can I say? Australians will always make the best punk music, and Clowns have set the bar for future releases."

Simon Valentine, writing for Wall of Sound Australia gave the album an 8 out of 10, praising the combination of punk and metal. "With a combo of classic metal moments and raw Aussie punk, Endless is a great album to get into. It will satisfy those already part of the Clowns fanbase, but I think will also succeed in gaining the attention of those ‘traditional’ metal folks who sport the patch-emblazoned denim battle jackets to every local gig."

== Track listing ==
All tracks are written by Clowns, except where noted.

No.	Title	Writer(s)	Length
1.	"Endless"		0:35
2.	"Formaldehyde"		3:18
3.	"Scared to Die"		3:16
4.	"Thanks 4 Nothing"		3:40
5.	"Bisexual Awakening"		1:49
6.	"I Got a Knife" (featuring The Baboon Show)	Clowns; Cecilia Boström	1:40
7.	"Z3r0s&0n3s"		3:25
8.	"Sarah"		3:36
9.	"Death Wish"		2:52
10.	"Enough's Enough"		2:27
11.	"Quicksand"		4:34
12.	"A Widow's Son" (featuring Anonymous Host of Casefile and Feine Sahne Fischfilet)	Clowns; Jan Gorkowm	8:40
Total length:			39:56

Notes

- All tracks, except for "Z3r0s&0n3s", are stylized in all caps. For example, "Endless" is stylized as "ENDLESS".

== Charts ==
Chart (2023)	Peak position
Australian Albums (ARIA)	36

== Personnel ==
- Stevie Williams – lead vocals
- Jake Laderman – drums
- Jarrod Goon – guitar
- Hanny Tilbrook – bass, backing vocals
- Cameron Rust – guitar
