= Nature/Nurture =

Nature / Nurture

Studio album by Clowns
- Released: 12 April 2019
- Genres: Punk rock; hardcore punk
- Length: 35:55
- Labels: Damaged; Fat Wreck Chords
- Producer: Jez Giddings

Clowns chronology
Lucid Again (2017)	Nature / Nurture (2019)	Endless (2023)

Nature / Nurture is the fourth studio album by the Australian hardcore punk band Clowns, released on 12 April 2019 through Fat Wreck Chords and Damaged Records, the band's own record label founded in 2018. It is the first album the band released throrugh Fat Wreck Chords, and the first album the band released after founding Damaged Records. It is structured into two segments – the "Nature" and "Nurture" segments – and is centered around contrast and duality, with the band describing the album as "an argument within itself".

== Composition ==
=== Style ===
Nature / Nurture has been described as a punk rock or hardcore punk album. Many critics have noted that the album had a more psychedelic sound than the band's previous albums, especially the latter part of the album, specifically mentioning the songs "May I Be Exhumed?" and "Nurture". Clowns made use of multiple instruments not conventionally used in punk music on Nature / Nurture, such as a sitar on "Nurture" and a keyboard on "1:19".

=== Lyrics ===
Lyrically, Nature / Nurture revolves around contrast and juxtaposition, and the band has stated their idea "was to write songs that juxtapose each other thematically and represent ideas and themes that clash against one another". "Bland Is The New Black" conveyed the band's anti-conformity sentiments, and "I Wanna Feel Again" concerns (the singer's) mental health issues.

== Reception ==
Professional ratings
Review scores
Source	Rating
Hysteria	9/10
Punk Rock Theory	7.5/10
Punknews.org	3.5/5 stars

Nature / Nurture received positive feedback from critics, who praised Clowns for the more experimental and psychedelic sound of the album compared to their earlier work and to most punk rock music. Amy Smith, writing for Hysteria Magazine, gave the album a 9 out of 10 and stated "Nature / Nurture has the potential to do big things for the Australian music scene" and that it was "absolutely no surprise that it has already caught the attention of international alternative powerhouse Fat Wreck Chords." Aine Keogh, writing for Sound the Sirens, commended the band for having "progressed technically and creatively."

The album was nominated for the 2019 ARIA Award for Best Hard Rock or Heavy Metal Album.

== Track listing ==
All tracks are written by Clowns.

"Nature"
No.	Title	Length
1.	"Bland Is the New Black"	1:47
2.	"Soul for Sale"	3:45
3.	"Freezing in the Sun"	3:55
4.	"Nature"	3:39
5.	"I Wanna Feel Again"	4:21

"Nurture"
No.	Title	Length
6.	"I Shaved My Legs for You"	4:22
7.	"1:19"	1:39
8.	"Prick"	2:27
9.	"Prey for Us"	3:23
10.	"May I Be Exhumed?"	1:27
11.	"Nurture"	5:05
Total length:		35:55

== Personnel ==
- Stevie Williams – vocals
- William Robinson – guitar
- Jarrod Goon – guitar
- Hanny Tilbrook – bass guitar, background vocals
- Jake Laderman – drums
- Mikey Young - mastering
- Jez Giddings – producing, recording
