= House of Cards (The Amity Affliction album) =

Studio album by the Amity Affliction
- Released: 24 April 2026
- Genres: Post-hardcore; metalcore
- Length: 40:33
- Label: Pure Noise
- Producer: Dan Brown

The Amity Affliction chronology
Not Without My Ghosts (2023)	House of Cards (2026)

Singles from House of Cards
- 1. "House of Cards" Released: 5 February 2026; 2. "Bleed" Released: 4 March 2026; 3. "Heaven Sent" Released: 10 April 2026

House of Cards is the ninth studio album by Australian post-hardcore band the Amity Affliction. The album was released on 24 April 2026 through Pure Noise Records and was produced by the band's guitarist Dan Brown. It is the first album to feature bassist and clean vocalist Jonathan Reeves, replacing founding member Ahren Stringer, who was fired in 2025 and it was also the final album with drummer Joe Longobardi, who left the band in june.

== Background ==
On 2 September 2024, Stringer announced that he would be taking a hiatus in 2025 from the Amity Affliction after the completion of the Australian dates for their Let The Ocean Take Me 10-year anniversary tour. His touring replacement was announced as American musician Jonathan Reeves, best known for his time in the band Kingdom of Giants. On 29 January 2025, Stringer announced he would not be touring with the band at all for the foreseeable future. On 14 February 2025, the Amity Affliction announced that Stringer had been fired from the band, citing "certain behaviours that have been directed at ourselves and those close to us," and they would be continuing as a three-piece. After Stringer's departure, none of the original members remain in the band, with Joel Birch being the longest-standing current member. The following week after the announcement of the split, it was revealed that Birch and Stringer were in a legal battle over a trademark for the name "Amity". On 29 May 2025, the band announced that Reeves had joined the band full-time.

In an interview with Valentino Petrarca from The Aquarian Weekly in October 2025, the Amity Affliction confirmed that the title of their finished new album would be House of Cards. Guitarist Dan Brown produced the album, marking the first time he has solely done so after co-producing Not Without My Ghosts alongside his bandmates.

== Release and promotion ==
On 5 February 2026, The Amity Affliction released the title track and officially announced the release date for House of Cards to be 24 April 2026. On 4 March 2026, the band released the second single "Bleed". On 10 April 2026, they released the third single "Heaven Sent".

== Track listing ==
All tracks are written by Joel Birch, Daniel Brown, Joeseph Longobardi, and Jonathan Reeves.

House of Cards track listing
No.	Title	Length
1.	"Vida Nueva"	1:28
2.	"Kickboxer"	2:46
3.	"House of Cards"	3:26
4.	"Heaven Sent"	4:11
5.	"Bleed"	3:40
6.	"Break These Chains"	3:40
7.	"Beso de la Muerte"	2:41
8.	"Swan Dive"	3:47
9.	"Speaking in Tongues"	3:38
10.	"Afterlife"	3:39
11.	"Reap What You Sow"	3:48
12.	"Eternal War"	3:49
Total length:		40:33

== Personnel ==
Credits are adapted from the album's liner notes and Tidal.

=== The Amity Affliction ===
- Joel Birch – lead vocals, design, layout
- Daniel Brown – guitars, programming, production, engineering
- Jonathan Reeves – bass guitar, clean vocals
- Joseph Longobardi – drums

=== Additional personnel ===
- Sam Bassal – mixing
- Randy Slaugh – programming
- Hedi Xandt – art direction, artwork

== Charts ==
Chart performance for House of Cards
Chart (2026)	Peak position
Australian Albums (ARIA)	4
UK Albums Sales (OCC)	90
UK Independent Albums (Official Charts)	28
UK Rock & Metal Albums (Official Charts)	13
US Top Album Sales (Billboard)	45
