= Confession (band) =

Australian metalcore band

- Origin: Melbourne, Australia
- Genre: Metalcore
- Years active: 2008–2016, 2019, 2020–present
- Labels: Resist (AU/NZ); Mediaskare (US/CDN/Japan); Lifeforce (EU)
- Members: Michael Crafter; Chris Shaw; Richie Newman; Jake Dargaville
- Past members: Matthew Owens; Borgs; Tyrone Burke; Tim Anderson; Shane O'Brien; Dan Brown; William Carrette; Doyle Perez; Jared Latham; Russell Holland; Lyndsay Antica; Dylan Stark

Confession are an Australian metalcore band from Melbourne. The band was formed in 2008 by frontman Michael Crafter, who is best known as the former lead vocalist of metalcore bands I Killed the Prom Queen, Carpathian and Bury Your Dead. They have released one EP titled Can't Live, Can't Breathe and three albums: Cancer, The Long Way Home and Life and Death.

== History ==
=== Formation and Can't Live, Can't Breathe (2008–2009) ===
Confession was started by Michael Crafter in 2008, following his Australian farewell tour with I Killed the Prom Queen. The first member that Crafter enlisted for his new band was guitarist Dan Brown, who previously played in Byron Bay based hardcore punk band 50 Lions and now plays in The Amity Affliction

On 11 October 2008, the band released their first EP on Resist Records entitled Can't Live, Can't Breathe. The EP featured a cover of the Frenzal Rhomb song "Ship of Beers", as well as 7 original songs, one of which was an intro. The band promoted the EP by touring Australia with Deez Nuts, featuring Crafter's ex-I Killed the Prom Queen bandmate JJ Peters. The band also served as openers for the Sweatfest Australian Tour in December 2008, featuring Parkway Drive and A Day to Remember as headliners, as well as Suicide Silence and The Acacia Strain.

=== Cancer (2009–2010) ===
On 9 October 2009, the band released their first full-length album, Cancer, which was recorded between June–September 2009 at Adelaide's Sound House Studio. The album earned the band Blunt Magazine's Album of the Year award. Following the release of Cancer, the band headlined their first Australian headlining tour in October–November 2009, with many local Australian metalcore and hardcore bands supporting them.

Before the recording of the album, the band parted ways with drummer Matthew Owens and bassist "Borgs". Shane O'Brien was soon added as the band's drummer, with bass duties being handled by guitarist Dan Brown who decided to switch from guitar to bass so it would ease on him to sing clean vocals. Tyrone Burke of Hiroshima Will Burn joined the band as his replacement on guitar and toured the band on the Sick Summer Tour supporting Parkway Drive in January–February 2010, though he was kicked out of the band later in 2010 after stealing money from the band. Kevin Cameron (ex-I Killed the Prom Queen) temporarily replaced Burke on guitar, until Dan Brown decided to return to his guitar duties, bringing Jamie Hope of The Red Shore to fill-in for him on bass.

In March–April 2010, the band played their first tour outside of Australia: a European tour supporting For the Fallen Dreams. After playing with the band for the Keeping it Bogan Tour, Jamie Hope was replaced by Byron Carney of 50 Lions. Though, Byron stay with the band was short and as the band was without the bassist at the time, Dan Brown was forced to return to bass duties and the band played as a 4-piece for a while, before ex-The Red Shore bassist Tim Anderson joined the band.

In July 2010, the band played on the Youngbloods Tour in support of The Amity Affliction, and in August, they have toured in support of House Vs. Hurricane on the Escape to OZ Tour. In October–November 2010, the band once again headlined an Australian tour with local hardcore bands as support acts,

=== The Long Way Home (2010–2012) ===
In November the band headed to Dan's home town of Byron Bay and started writing the new album at the Parkway Drive house. The band felt this was the best place to write the new album. Just so happened Parkway was away and the Gordon family was happy to let Confession set up in the basement to write the new album. These sessions lasted 3 weeks.

December 2010, the band played 5 dates as part of the No Sleep Til Festival, alongside such bands as Megadeth, NOFX, A Day to Remember, August Burns Red, Alkaline Trio and more.

In April 2011, the band flew to Gothenburg, Sweden, to start recording their second studio album, with producer Fredrik Nordström at his Studio Fredman. Recording began on 18 April and ended on 29 April 2011. Following the wrapping of the recording, the band went on a European tour supporting Swedish hardcore punk band Raised Fist, along with melodic hardcore band Hundredth, between 30 April – 14 May.

Between 18–28 May 2011, the band played as one of the opening acts to Parkway Drive on the Australian Mix N' Mash Tour, along with Miss May I and The Wonder Years.<

On 7 August 2011, the band had announced that their new album will be titled The Long Way Home, and also revealed its artwork and release date as being 23 September 2011.

On 17 August 2011, the band released their first single from The Long Way Home, entitled "Asthma Attack". A tour in support of the album, entitled The Long Way Home Tour was announced to take place between 7–30 October 2011, with supporting acts Thy Art Is Murder and Antagonist A.D.

Confession opened for Parkway Drive on their 2012 European tour. The other bands on the bill were The Ghost Inside and Miss May I.

=== New lineup (2012–2013) ===
On 9 May 2012, the band announced that they had parted ways with vocalist Michael Crafter. An unaware Crafter tweeted that he was kicked out without him knowing. In a turn of events, Crafter went on the band's Facebook page, banned all the other members from accessing the account, changed the band location to Perth, Australia, and then kicked out all the band members via a Facebook post: "It's Crafter here. I would like to announce that the members who used to play in this band have tried to double cross me. I have now kicked out all members of the band and will be looking for legit friends to play within the band." An interview with Stu on Short Fast Loud later that night would clarify the situation.

The band toured Japan in January 2013. They then played the Soundwave festival across Australia, during February 2013, as well as two Sidewave shows opening for Gallows. On 19 August, the band announced on their Facebook that Doyle had left the band to focus on his solo career of acoustic covers. Confession took part in Parkway Drive's 10 Years of Parkway Drive tour alongside Thy Art Is Murder. At one show, Andy Marsh of Thy Art Is Murder filled in on guitar while Sean Delander and Lee Stanton of Thy Art Is Murder provided guest rap and singing parts. The video of this performance was a viral hit. The band commenced working on a new full length and also took part in the Vans Warped Tour in Australia in November and December 2013 alongside The Amity Affliction, The Offspring, Parkway Drive and Hatebreed. Jamey Jasta complimented Crafter on his extensive array of camo clothing.

=== Life and Death (2014–2016) ===
The band headed to California to record Life and Death with producer Dan Castleman at Lambesis Studios in February 2014. A new song "Fuck Cancer", using the same name as Crafter's charity work, was released on 12 May via Channel V. The video contains many cancer survivors and their families. The subject matter and video is seen as a reaction to the current vapid state of meaningless heavy music. The album was released on 20 June 2014.

On 7 October 2015 Crafter announced his retirement from the band and music. A farewell tour in Australia took place in January 2016.

=== Comeback (2020–present) ===
On 22 October 2020, Confession released a new song called "Twenty Twenty". It was recorded by Crafter and former member Dan Brown during the COVID-19 lockdowns and features the singer's daughter Kennedy in the video and vocals.

In 2022 Confession announced the When Goodbye Means It’s Life and Death tour, which took place in Australia across September and October. The tour name combines the title of I Killed the Prom Queen's debut album and Confession's final album, and the band performed songs from both bands at the shows. The shows served as a tribute to the late I Killed the Prom Queen bassist Sean Kennedy, who took his own life the previous year. The band also stated their intention to record new music as well, although so far none has been forthcoming.

== Members ==
Final line-up

- Michael Crafter – lead vocals (2008–2020)
- Chris Shaw – guitar (2020)
- Richie Newman – guitar, clean vocals (2016–2020)
- Jake Dargaville – drums (2012–2020)

Former

- Matthew Owens – drums, percussion (2008–2009)
- Dan Brown – clean vocals, guitar (2008–2012), bass (2009–2010)
- Shane O'Brien – drums, percussion (2009–2012)
- Tyrone Burke - guitar (2009–2010)
- Tim Anderson – bass (2010–2012)
- William Carrette – guitar (2012)
- Doyle Perez – guitar, clean vocals (2012–2013)
- Jared Latham – bass (2012–2013)
- Russell Holland - guitar (2012–2015)
- Lydnsey Antica - guitar (2014–2015)
- Dylan Startk - bass (2015)

Timeline (2008-2016)

== Discography ==
=== Albums ===
List of albums, with Australian chart positions
Title	Album details	Peak chart positions
Title	Album details	AUS
Cancer	Released: October 2009; Format: CD; Label: Resist (RES091)	69
The Long Way Home	Released: September 2011; Format: CD; Label:	47
Life and Death	Released: 2014; Format: CD; Label:	19

=== Extended plays ===
List of albums, with selected details
Title	Details
Can't Live, Can't Breathe	Released: 2008; Format: CD; Label:
