= Not Without My Ghosts =

2023 studio album by the Amity Affliction

Studio album by the Amity Affliction
- Released: 12 May 2023
- Genres: Metalcore; post-hardcore
- Length: 38:05
- Label: Pure Noise
- Producer: The Amity Affliction

The Amity Affliction chronology
Everyone Loves You... Once You Leave Them (2020)	Not Without My Ghosts (2023)	House of Cards (2026)

Singles from Not Without My Ghosts
- 1. "Show Me Your God" Released: 29 November 2022; 2. "I See Dead People" Released: 13 February 2023; 3. "It's Hell Down Here" Released: 22 March 2023; 4. "Not Without My Ghosts" Released: 20 April 2023

Not Without My Ghosts is the eighth studio album by Australian post-hardcore band the Amity Affliction. The album was released on 12 May 2023 through Pure Noise Records and was self-produced by the band. It is the final album to feature founding co-lead vocalist and bassist Ahren Stringer, who was fired in 2025.

At the 2023 ARIA Music Awards, the album was nominated for Best Hard Rock or Heavy Metal Album. The album was nominated for Best Record at the Rolling Stone Australia Awards.

== Background and promotion ==
On 29 November 2022, the Amity Affliction released unveiled the first single "Show Me Your God" and its corresponding music video. On 23 December, the band had chosen and confirmed the album title for the new record.

On 13 February 2023, the band published the second single "I See Dead People" featuring Louie Knuxx along with an accompanying music video. On 22 March, the band premiered the third single "It's Hell Down Here" along with a music video. At the same time, they officially announced the album itself and release date while also revealed the album cover and the track list. On 20 April, one month before the album release, the band released the fourth single and title track "Not Without My Ghosts" featuring Phem.

== Critical reception ==
Professional ratings
Review scores
Source	Rating
Blabbermouth.net	8/10
Distorted Sound	6/10
New Noise	4.5/5 stars
Wall of Sound	9.5/10

The album received generally positive reviews from critics. Anne Erickson from Blabbermouth.net gave the album 8 out of 10 and said: "With metalcore screams, brutal breakdowns and a few glimmers of clean singing, Not Without My Ghosts is an apt next step for The Amity Affliction. Bands that form in high school have a lot of growth to do, and The Amity Affliction seem to be following that instinct and evolving, without abandoning the sound for which they're known. It will be interesting to hear what's ahead for this ever-blossoming band." Katie Bird of Distorted Sound scored the album 6 out of 10 and said: "Whilst Not Without My Ghosts does have some different styles of music for a few songs, the rest of the album treads the same waters that The Amity Affliction have explored many times before. That is not to say that it's a bad one, because it most certainly isn't. However, it seems that the band have taken the harsh criticism to heart and fallen back into old sounds. If you like their original sound, then this album will be for you. However, if you are looking for a fresh take from these Aussie veterans, you'll have to look elsewhere."

New Noise gave the album 4.5 out of 5 and stated: "From the writing to the musicianship, Not Without My Ghosts is an excellent album fitting of Amity Affliction's legendary canon. The band presses on as a needed voice in the scene." Wall of Sound gave the album a score 9.5/10 and saying: "These Australian melodic metalcore heavyweights have delivered an album that will most definitely leave the haters and naysayers taking back every bad word they ever said about this band. We spoke with Joel Birch about the album and their intentions to go back to a heavier sound, make sure to read that too in the lead up to Friday's release. Not only do The Amity Affliction still have what it takes, but this album will stand up strong amongst the best in their back catalogue for years to come."

== Track listing ==
Not Without My Ghosts track listing
No.	Title	Length
1.	"Show Me Your God"	3:37
2.	"It's Hell Down Here"	4:00
3.	"Fade Away"	3:45
4.	"Death and the Setting Sun" (featuring Andrew Neufeld of Comeback Kid)	4:07
5.	"I See Dead People" (featuring Louie Knuxx)	3:36
6.	"When It Rains It Pours" (featuring Landon Tewers of The Plot in You)	4:01
7.	"The Big Sleep"	3:59
8.	"Close to Me"	3:56
9.	"God Voice"	3:34
10.	"Not Without My Ghosts" (featuring Phem)	3:30
Total length:		38:05

== Personnel ==
The Amity Affliction

- Joel Birch – lead vocals
- Ahren Stringer – co-lead vocals, bass
- Dan Brown – guitars, backing vocals
- Joe Longobardi – drums, percussion

Additional musicians

- Andrew Neufeld of Comeback Kid – guest vocals on track 4
- Louie Knuxx – posthumous guest vocals on track 5
- Landon Tewers of The Plot in You – guest vocals on track 6
- Phem – guest vocals on track 10

Additional personnel

- The Amity Affliction – production
- Henrik Udd – mixing, mastering
- Randy Slaugh – programming

== Charts ==
Chart performance for Not Without My Ghosts
Chart (2023)	Peak position
Australian Albums (ARIA)	2
Scottish Albums (Official Charts)	81
UK Independent Albums (Official Charts)	19
UK Rock & Metal Albums (Official Charts)	6
