= Youngbloods (album) =

Studio album by the Amity Affliction
- Released: 18 June 2010
- Genre: Metalcore; post-hardcore
- Length: 38:07
- Label: Boomtown
- Producer: Gene "Machine" Freeman

The Amity Affliction chronology
Severed Ties (2008)	Youngbloods (2010)	Chasing Ghosts (2012)

Youngbloods is the second studio album by Australian post-hardcore band the Amity Affliction. It was released on 18 June 2010 through Boomtown Records. It debuted at number 6 on the ARIA Charts. Grammy-nominated producer Machine produced Youngbloods. The drums were recorded at Breakwater Music Studio in Hazlet, NJ. All other tracks were recorded at the Machine Shop in Weehawken, NJ. This is the first and the only record to feature guitarist Clint Owen Ellis (Splattering), where Troy Brady temporarily switched to rhythm guitar for Ellis to take the lead. This was also the last record that features keyboardist Trad Nathan.

US pop punk band Four Year Strong contribute to the gang vocals on "I Hate Hartley". Helmet Roberts does guest vocals on "Fuck the Yankees". "15 Pieces of Flare" is a bonus track that comes with the iTunes download of the album. Prior to the release of Youngbloods, the band updated their website with updates on their writing and recording process with Machine.

It was nominated for a 2010 ARIA Award for Best Hard Rock/Heavy Metal Album but lost to the Australian band Parkway Drive. It was awarded "Album of the Year 2010" by Blunt Magazine.

== Track listing ==
No.	Title	Length
1.	"I Hate Hartley"	3:51
2.	"Anchors"	3:48
3.	"H.M.A.S. Lookback"	4:10
4.	"Fire or Knife"	3:15
5.	"Youngbloods"	3:50
6.	"Dr. Thunder"	3:50
7.	"Olde English 800"	3:43
8.	"No Sleep 'Till Brisbane"	3:37
9.	"R.I.P. Foghorn"	4:08
10.	"Fuck the Yankees" (featuring Helmet Roberts)	3:55
Total length:		38:12

== Personnel ==
The Amity Affliction

- Joel Birch – vocals
- Ahren Stringer – bass, vocals
- Troy Brady – guitar
- Clint Owen Ellis – guitar
- Trad Nathan – keyboards
- Ryan Burt – drums

== Certifications ==
Region	Certification	Certified units/sales
Australia (ARIA)	Gold	35,000^{^}
^{^} Shipments figures based on certification alone.
