= Misery (album) =

Studio album by the Amity Affliction
- Released: 24 August 2018
- Recorded: Various studios Buzzlounge Studios (Beltsville, Maryland); Noble Street Studios (Toronto, Ontario)
- Genre: Melodic metalcore; hard rock; post-hardcore; synth-pop; alternative rock
- Length: 43:03
- Label: UNFD; Roadrunner
- Producer: Matt Squire

The Amity Affliction chronology
This Could Be Heartbreak (2016)	Misery (2018)	Everyone Loves You... Once You Leave Them (2020)

Singles from Misery
- 1. "Ivy (Doomsday)" Released: 20 June 2018; 2. "Feels Like I'm Dying" Released: 27 July 2018; 3. "D.I.E." Released: 27 August 2018; 4. "Drag the Lake" Released: 28 January 2019

Misery is the sixth studio album by Australian post-hardcore band the Amity Affliction. The album was released on 24 August 2018. It is the first album without drummer Ryan Burt, following his departure in February 2018. It is the first album to feature Joe Longobardi on drums. However, during recording and the release of this album, he was only a session drummer. He was not made official until the end of 2018. It is also the first album to feature Joel Birch performing clean vocals on some tracks on the album along with the album being a departure from the band's usual straight metalcore sound and instead included some electronic elements on top of the metalcore sound. It is the band's final album for Roadrunner and UNFD.

== Track listing ==
No.	Title	Length
1.	"Ivy (Doomsday)"	3:39
2.	"Feels Like I'm Dying"	3:39
3.	"Holier Than Heaven"	4:07
4.	"Burn Alive"	3:28
5.	"Misery"	3:54
6.	"Kick Rocks"	3:20
7.	"Black Cloud"	3:47
8.	"D.I.E."	3:14
9.	"Drag the Lake"	3:32
10.	"Beltsville Blues"	3:30
11.	"Set Me Free"	3:31
12.	"The Gifthorse"	3:22
Total length:		43:03

== Personnel ==
Credits for Misery adapted from liner notes.

The Amity Affliction

- Joel Birch – vocals, art direction, design, photography
- Dan Brown – guitar
- Ahren Stringer – vocals, bass, art direction

Additional personnel

- Alex Krotz – engineering
- Shane Collins – additional lyrics
- Joe Longobardi – drums
- Matt Squire – keyboards, synthesizer, programming, production
- Eric Taft – engineering, additional production
- Josh Wilbur – mixing, mastering
- Caleb Williams – management

== Charts ==
Chart (2018)	Peak position
Australian Albums (ARIA)	1
Austrian Albums (Ö3 Austria)	39
Belgian Albums (Ultratop Flanders)	154
German Albums (Offizielle Top 100)	38
Scottish Albums (OCC)	83
Swiss Albums (Schweizer Hitparade)	51
US Billboard 200	70
