= Let the Ocean Take Me =

Studio album by the Amity Affliction
- Released: 6 June 2014
- Genre: Metalcore; post-hardcore
- Length: 42:11 (CD); 41:23 (Digital)
- Label: UNFD; Roadrunner
- Producer: Will Putney

The Amity Affliction chronology
Chasing Ghosts (2012)	Let the Ocean Take Me (2014)	This Could Be Heartbreak (2016)

Singles from Let the Ocean Take Me
- 1. "Pittsburgh" Released: 15 April 2014; 2. "Don't Lean on Me" Released: 16 May 2014; 3. "The Weigh Down" Released: 19 September 2014; 4. "Death's Hand" Released: 8 December 2014; 5. "Skeletons" Released: 10 July 2015; 6. "Farewell" Released: 15 July 2015

Let the Ocean Take Me is the fourth studio album by Australian post-hardcore band the Amity Affliction. It was released on 6 June 2014 in Australia, 9 June 2014 in the UK and 10 June 2014 in the US through Roadrunner Records. It is their first record to feature new guitarist Dan Brown following Imran Siddiqi's departure shortly before their previous album release (August 2012). This is also the last album with founding lead guitarist, Troy Brady.

Music videos for "The Weigh Down" and "Death's Hand" were produced to promote the album, but were not released as singles. On 10 June 2015, Amity released their first DVD documentary-film Seems Like Forever, containing two previously unreleased songs from Let The Ocean Take Me including "Skeletons", which was later released as a music video.

On 6–8 June off the Australian album release, Amity conducted in-store album signings in Brisbane, Sydney and Melbourne in support. The band shortly announced a five-date Australian tour, fifteen-date American tour and a twenty-three date European leg. The Big Ass Tour with A Day to Remember co-headlining was held in Australia and New Zealand in December 2015.

In celebration of the 10 year anniversary of the album, the band released a re-recorded ("Redux") version of the album on 27 September 2024. A re-recorded version of the track "My Father's son" was released on 21 August 2024.

At the AIR Awards of 2025, the album won Best Independent Heavy Album or EP.

At the 2025 ARIA Music Awards, the album was nominated for ARIA Award for Best Hard Rock or Heavy Metal Album.

== Critical reception ==
Professional ratings
Aggregate scores
Source	Rating
Metacritic	76/100
Review scores
Source	Rating
AllMusic	3.5/5 stars

The album was given a Metacritic score of 76 out of 100, indicating "generally favourable reviews". Kerrang! called it the band's "most accomplished release yet", and AllMusic noted the "lyrical depth" of the album. Alternative Press received the sound evolution positively.

The album debuted at number 1 on the ARIA Charts, being their second consecutive album to do so, following 2012's Chasing Ghosts. Let the Ocean Take Me was certified gold by the Australian Recording Industry Association for over 35,000 shipments sold just two weeks after its release in Australia. It was certified platinum in December 2015.

In the United States, the album sold 10,000 copies in its first week, charting at number 31 on the Billboard 200. It has sold 60,000 copies in the US as of June 2016.

Both the singles preceding the album, "Pittsburgh" and "Don't Lean on Me" peaked inside the top 40 of the ARIA Singles Chart.

Following the success of the album, the Amity Affliction was nominated for the "Breakthrough Band of the Year" award at the 2015 Metal Hammer Golden Gods Awards, alongside Halestorm, Bury Tomorrow and In This Moment, but lost out to Babymetal.

== Track listing ==
All lyrics are written by Ahren Stringer and Joel Birch; all music is composed by The Amity Affliction.

No.	Title	Length
1.	"Pittsburgh (Note: The digital version of the album cut out the intro of this song, making it a length of 4:00.)"	4:48
2.	"Lost & Fading"	4:31
3.	"Don't Lean on Me"	3:33
4.	"The Weigh Down"	3:31
5.	"Never Alone"	5:38
6.	"Death's Hand"	4:15
7.	"F.M.L."	3:26
8.	"My Father's Son"	3:37
9.	"Forest Fire"	3:39
10.	"Give It All"	4:57
Total length:		42:11

Japanese bonus track
No.	Title	Length
11.	"Open Letter" (live)	5:22

Deluxe edition bonus tracks
No.	Title	Length
11.	"Skeletons"	4:14
12.	"Farewell"	3:23

Deluxe edition bonus DVD
No.	Title	Length
1.	"Seems Like Forever" (documentary)

== Personnel ==
The Amity Affliction

- Joel Birch – vocals, art direction
- Ahren Stringer – vocals, bass, art direction
- Troy Brady – guitar
- Dan Brown – guitar
- Ryan Burt – drums, percussion

Additional musicians

- Matt Rogers (credited as RealBadDTD) – spoken interlude

Production

- Will Putney – production, engineering, mixing, mastering
- Jay Sakong – additional programming
- Andy Gomoll – additional editing

Management

- Jaddan Comerford and Caleb Williams (Unified) – worldwide management
- Dave Shapiro (The Agency Group) – U.S./Asia booking
- Adam Sylvester (The Agency Group) – Canada booking
- Marco Walzel (Avocado Booking) – UK/Europe booking
- Unified – Australia booking
- Andy Serrao (Roadrunner Records) – worldwide A&R

Artwork

- Pat Fox (Apollo Collective) – design, layout, art direction
- James Hartley – photography

== Charts ==
=== Weekly charts ===
Weekly chart performance for Let the Ocean Take Me
Chart (2014)	Peak position
Australian Albums (ARIA)	1
New Zealand Albums (RMNZ)	24
US Billboard 200	31
US Top Hard Rock Albums (Billboard)	3
US Top Rock Albums (Billboard)	11

Chart performance for Let the Ocean Take Me (Redux)
Chart (2024)	Peak position
Australian Albums (ARIA)	7
Scottish Albums (OCC)	93
UK Independent Albums (OCC)	37

=== Year-end charts ===
Year-end chart performance for Let the Ocean Take Me
Chart (2014)	Position
Australian Albums (ARIA)	24

== Certifications ==
Region	Certification	Certified units/sales
Australia (ARIA)	Platinum	70,000^{^}
^{^} Shipments figures based on certification alone.
