= Severed Ties =

Studio album by the Amity Affliction
- Released: 4 October 2008
- Genre: Metalcore; post-hardcore
- Length: 40:00
- Label: Boomtown
- Producer: Darren Thompson

The Amity Affliction chronology
High Hopes (2007)	Severed Ties (2008)	Youngbloods (2010)

Severed Ties is the debut studio album by Australian post-hardcore band the Amity Affliction. It was released on 4 October 2008 through Boomtown Records, which debuted at No. 26 on the ARIA Albums Chart, and No. 6 on the related Australian Artists Albums Chart.

The album was the last release to feature guitarist Chris Burt and the first to feature drummer Ryan Burt.

== Background ==
"Poison Pen Letters" was re-recorded for Severed Ties, it originally appeared on the demo compilation, State of Affairs – a collection of tracks by hardcore bands from the five mainland states of Australia. "Love Is a Battlefield" is a cover of a track by Pat Benatar. Three tracks contained samples from feature films, however due to copyright restrictions, the then-active label of Boomtown was forced to remove them. The first few thousand copies printed of the album retained the samples: "I Heart Roberts'" contains one from the film, Hot Rod, "The Blair Snitch Project" had a sample from True Romance in its intro, and "Stairway to Hell" contains sound samples from Hot Rod and Happy Gilmore. The group's insider joke is in the initialism, "B.D.K.I.A.F.", which stands for "Big Dick Know It All Fuck"; while "Do You Party?" is a reference to a joke in Hot Rod.

== Track listing ==
All tracks are written by The Amity Affliction, except where noted.

No.	Title	Length
1.	"I Heart Roberts'" (featuring Helmet Roberts of the Daylight Curse) (contains samples from the film Hot Rod)	3:34
2.	"B.D.K.I.A.F." ("Big Dick Know It All Fuck")	3:17
3.	"Snitches Get Stitches" (featuring Lochlan Watt of Ironhide)	3:21
4.	"Do You Party?"	3:01
5.	"Poison Pen Letters"	4:11
6.	"Fruity Lexia"	3:30
7.	"So You Melted?" (featuring Matthew Wright of The Getaway Plan)	2:48
8.	"Jesse Intense" (featuring Michael Crafter of Confession and Matthew Wright of The Getaway Plan)	4:13
9.	"The Blair Snitch Project" (contains samples from the film True Romance)	3:41
10.	"Love Is a Battlefield" (Pat Benatar cover) (written by Mike Chapman and Holly Knight)	3:55
11.	"Stairway to Hell" (featuring JJ Peters of Deez Nuts) (contains samples from the films Hot Rod and Happy Gilmore)	4:30
Total length:		40:00

== Personnel ==
The Amity Affliction

- Joel Birch – vocals
- Ahren Stringer – bass, vocals
- Troy Brady – guitar
- Chris Burt – guitar
- Trad Nathan – keyboards, synths, programming, samples
- Ryan Burt – drums

Additional musicians

- Helmet Roberts (The Daylight Curse) – guest vocals on "I Heart Roberts'"
- Lochlan Watt (Ironhide) – guest vocals on "Snitches Get Stitches"
- Matthew Wright (The Getaway Plan) – guest vocals on "So You Melted..." and "Jesse Intense"
- Michael Crafter (Confession) – guest vocals on "Jesse Intense"
- JJ Peters (Deez Nuts) – guest vocals on "Stairway to Hell"

Production

- Darren Thompson – Producer
