= This Could Be Heartbreak =

Studio album by the Amity Affliction
- Released: 12 August 2016
- Genre: Metalcore; post-hardcore
- Length: 44:54
- Label: UNFD; Roadrunner
- Producer: Will Putney

The Amity Affliction chronology
Let the Ocean Take Me (2014)	This Could Be Heartbreak (2016)	Misery (2018)

Singles from This Could Be Heartbreak
- 1. "I Bring the Weather with Me" Released: 19 May 2016; 2. "This Could Be Heartbreak" Released: 12 July 2016; 3. "All Fucked Up" Released: 26 August 2016

This Could Be Heartbreak is the fifth studio album by Australian post-hardcore band the Amity Affliction. The album was released through Roadrunner Records on 12 August 2016. It is the last album to feature drummer Ryan Burt, who had been recording with the band since their debut album Severed Ties (2008).

== Singles and promotion ==
On 18 May 2016, the band previewed their new album with the lead single "I Bring the Weather with Me". On 11 July, they released the title track as the next single, being accompanied with a music video directed by Mark Staubach. On 9 August, the band premiered the lyric video for their third single "All Fucked Up".

On 6 June 2016, the band announced a North American headlining tour to support their upcoming album, starting on 10 September at Denver's High Elevation Festival and finishing on 22 October at The Glass House in Pomona, California. Being as an Ocean, Hundredth and Trophy Eyes were supporting acts on all dates, with Deadships on select shows. On 1 July, they announced a UK headlining tour in December, beginning on 4 December at The Waterfront in Norwich and ending on 10 December at the O2 Academy Bristol. Northlane, Stray from the Path and Wage War were supporting acts during the tour. Four days later, the band added European dates to their tour, starting on 29 November at Leipzig's Täubchenthal and finishing on 22 December at Madrid's Sala Arena. On 21 August, they announced a 13-day regional Australian tour, beginning on 21 January 2017 at the Lake Kawana Community Centre. Hellions and Ocean Grove were supporting acts on the tour.

== Track listing ==
No.	Title	Length
1.	"I Bring the Weather with Me"	4:36
2.	"This Could Be Heartbreak"	3:53
3.	"Nightmare"	3:47
4.	"Tearing Me Apart"	3:47
5.	"O.M.G.I.M.Y."	4:51
6.	"All Fucked Up"	3:49
7.	"Fight My Regret"	3:37
8.	"Some Friends"	3:34
9.	"Wishbone"	3:45
10.	"Note to Self"	3:53
11.	"Blood in My Mouth"	5:15
Total length:		44:54

Notes

- "O.M.G.I.M.Y." is initialism for "Oh My God I'm Missing You".
- "All Fucked Up" is listed as "All Messed Up" on clean editions of the album.

== Personnel ==
The Amity Affliction

- Joel Birch – vocals
- Ahren Stringer – vocals, bass
- Dan Brown – guitar
- Ryan Burt – drums

Additional personnel

- Ursula Kurasik – piano and additional string arrangements

== Charts ==
=== Weekly charts ===
Chart (2016)	Peak position
Australian Albums (ARIA)	1
Austrian Albums (Ö3 Austria)	25
Belgian Albums (Ultratop Flanders)	145
German Albums (Offizielle Top 100)	29
New Zealand Albums (RMNZ)	32
Scottish Albums (OCC)	33
Swiss Albums (Schweizer Hitparade)	31
UK Albums (OCC)	51
UK Rock & Metal Albums (OCC)	1
US Billboard 200	26

=== Year-end charts ===
Chart (2016)	Position
Australian Albums (ARIA)	44
