= The Amity Affliction =

Australian post-hardcore band

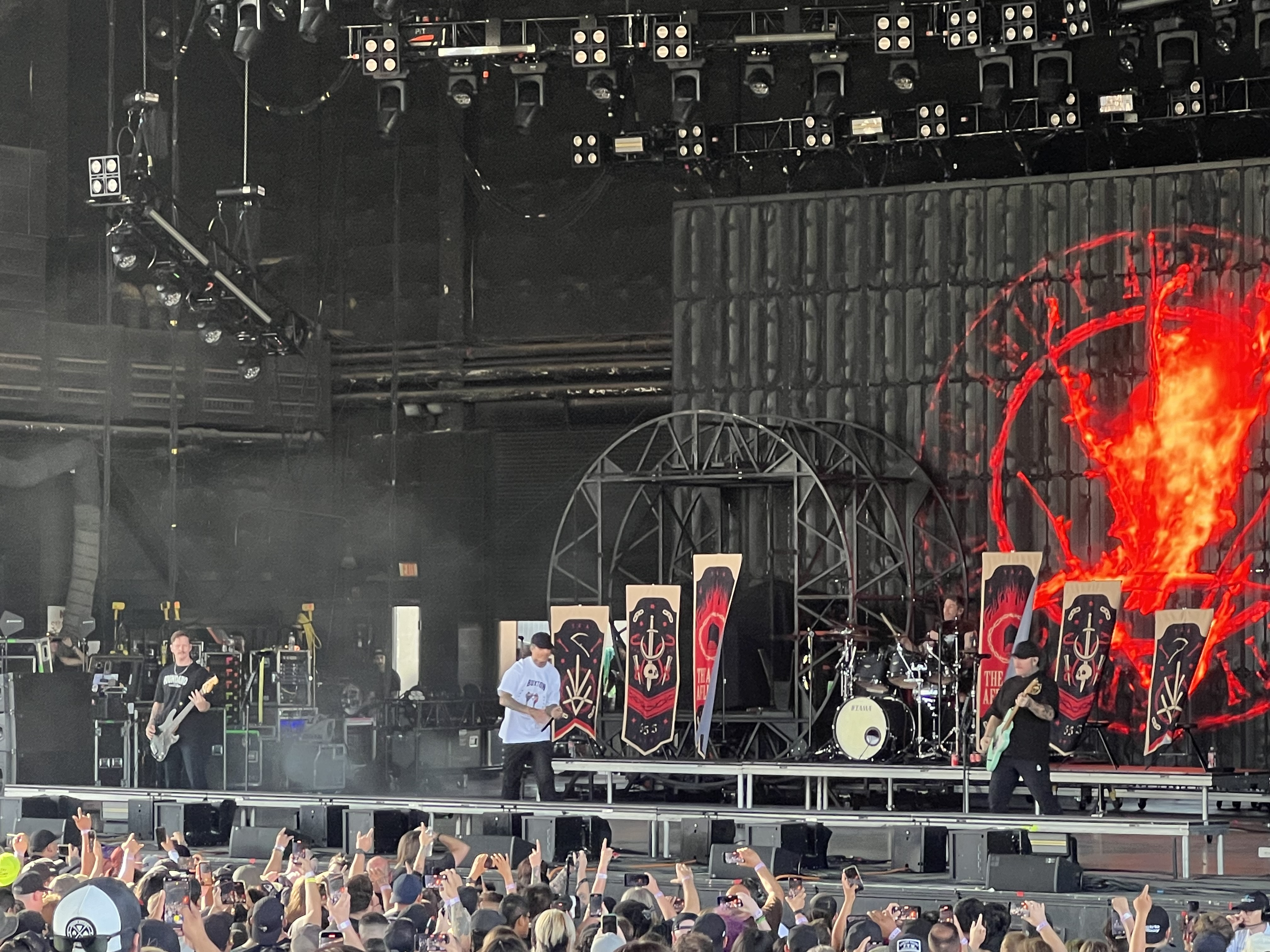
- The Amity Affliction performing for the Summer of Loud 2025 Tour in Phoenix, Arizona

Background information
- Origin: Gympie, Queensland, Australia
- Genres: Post-hardcore; metalcore
- Years active: 2003–present
- Labels: Roadrunner; UNFD; Boomtown; Pure Noise
- Members: Joel Birch; Dan Brown; Jonathan Reeves
- Past members: Ryan Burt; Ahren Stringer; Lachlan Faulkner; Garth Buchanan; Troy Brady; Troels Thomasen; Trad Nathan; Chris Burt; Clint Owen Ellis; Joe Longobardi
- Website: theamityaffliction.net

The Amity Affliction is an Australian metalcore band originally from Gympie, Queensland, formed in 2003. The band currently consists of Joel Birch (lead vocals), Dan Brown (guitar) and Jonathan Reeves (bass, vocals). The band has released nine studio albums – the most recent of which, House of Cards, was released in 2026. They are known for their highly personal songs, often dealing with depression, anxiety, death, substance abuse, and suicide, many lyrics stemming from vocalist Joel Birch's past struggles.

== History ==
=== Formation and early releases (2003–2008) ===
The Amity Affliction formed in Gympie, a South-East Queensland town in Australia, by friends Ahren Stringer and Troy Brady in their final year of high school. The band was named for a close friend of the band, who died in a car accident at the age of 17. 'Amity' referred to the friendship, and 'Affliction' was to indicate the struggle that dealing with the death caused the band members. Whilst still at high school, the band spent many times playing at school concerts and lunch breaks.

In 2004, The Amity Affliction released a three track self-titled demo produced by Scott Mullane at Aisle 6 Recording. At the time of recording, Stringer and Brady were joined by Garth Buchanan on bass and Lachlan Faulkner on drums. In late 2004, vocalist Joel Birch joined the band. In mid-2005, The Amity Affliction released their debut self-titled EP. After the release of the EP, they toured the east coast of Australia. Later that year, Faulker quit to join the band Saint Lucia; he was replaced by Troels Thomasson.

A second line-up change followed some 18 months later when a keyboardist, Trad Nathan, expanded the band to a six-piece. Buchanan left shortly thereafter to join Behind Crimson Eyes. He was replaced by new bassist Chris Burt, although he lasted only a few months in the role before he swapped instruments with guitarist Stringer. The Amity Affliction released a new five track EP entitled High Hopes which was named for the house in which The Amityville Horror took place. The first pressing came in a CD/DVD package. The DVD featured the band discussing the recording of the EP, it also featured the band on the road and performing.

=== Severed Ties (2008–2010) ===
The band released their debut studio album in 2008, entitled Severed Ties. The album spent a week on the Australian Albums Chart at number 26. The album was the first material to feature Chris Burt's brother Ryan Burt on drums, who had replaced Thomasen shortly before the band entered the studio. The album features guest vocals from Michael Crafter of I Killed the Prom Queen/Confession, Matthew Wright of the Getaway Plan, JJ Peters of I Killed the Prom Queen/Deez Nuts/Grips 'N' Tonic, Helmet Roberts and Lochlan Watt (Nuclear Summer). A music video was released for the song Fruity Lexia. The Amity Affliction played numerous shows across Sydney, Melbourne, Brisbane, Adelaide and Perth.

During May 2009, they supported the Getaway Plan along with Perth band Elora Danan, on the Getaway Plan's national Finale Tour.

The Amity Affliction undertook a headlining tour across Australia in 2009. They also played the 2009 Stairway to Hell Tour across Australia with support from UK band We Are the Ocean and Melbourne band Hopeless, with a local support band for each city. The Amity Affliction then went to the UK for a full tour supporting We Are the Ocean alongside Flood of Red and All Forgotten.

=== Youngbloods (2010–2011) ===
In late 2009, The Amity Affliction parted ways with guitarist Christopher Burt. The decision was mutual and had been planned for some time. His last show was in London in December 2009. While all the members are still good friends with Chris, the decision was made in the best interest of the band musically. Chris now plays guitar and sings in Brisbane based band SENSaii. Afterwards, Clint Ellis (Splattering) from the Getaway Plan took his place.

In April 2010, the band flew out to New York to record their second full-length record with producer Machine. On 10 May, the band uploaded a new song from this album, "I Hate Hartley" on their MySpace and the song was later available for free download.

On a pushed-forward date on 18 June as announced on their website (originally 25 June 2010), the band released their second studio album Youngbloods on Boomtown and Shock Records. The album was a huge success for the band, receiving critical acclaim and debuting at number 6 on the ARIA charts. The Amity Affliction went on tour in July to support the release of their second album. Joining them was Misery Signals, fellow Australians Confession and Scottish band Flood of Red. They toured Western Australia a few weeks later, joined by local band Break Even.

In October, the band announced they would be releasing Glory Days, which would be a compilation of old demos and the first two EPs as well as two B-sides from Youngbloods. Glory Days was released on 26 November. They then announced a UK tour with Asking Alexandria and one following with long-time friends Deez Nuts, Endwell and Louie Knuxx.

In the autumn of 2010, The Amity Affliction had their first American interview with alternative scene magazine Substream Music Press for its 22nd issue, just after signing to The Artery Foundation. The band found out they would be performing at the next Soundwave festival during the actual interview for the article.

On 30 May 2011, the band released their second music video from Youngbloods; following the music video for "I Hate Hartley", the new music video for the song "Youngbloods" was released exclusively on Guvera.com.

In late 2011, the band embarked on their headline nationwide tour, Fuck the Reaper, with supporting acts Asking Alexandria, Skyway and a local band in each city.

=== Chasing Ghosts (2012–2013) ===
During the 17 September 2011 show in Townsville, Queensland, vocalist Joel Birch announced that they were planning to head over to America early 2012 to record their third album.

Then again on 22 September 2011, Ahren stated in an interview with Alt Music Hub that the band planned to begin recording their new album in March/April 2012.

On 8 February 2012, it was announced that The Amity Affliction had been signed to Roadrunner Records for their next album and future.

On 7 May 2012, the band headed over to Orlando, Florida, to start recording their third album with producer Michael Baskette.

On 7 June 2012, it was announced the band's third studio album would be titled Chasing Ghosts and was set to be released on 7 September 2012 in Australia, 17 September for the UK, and 18 September for the US.

Shortly after the announcement, the album's cover was revealed. The cover depicts a man hanging from a tree who is thought to have committed suicide. The graphic nature of this image caused much controversy among social media. The situation was very ironic due to the main message behind the album being anti-suicide and urging fans who feel suicidal to turn to people close to them and seeking help rather than taking their own life. The band later apologized for the artwork along with the responses band members made to fans regarding the artwork.

It was revealed in a news article and magazine cover posted on 13/14 August that guitarist Imran Siddiqi would no longer be a part of the band. Furthermore, Siddiqi then did not appear in the video clip for the single "Chasing Ghosts" released on 15 August. A fill in guitarist played their album tour and U.S tour in late 2012.

After the release of Chasing Ghosts, the band had an Australian nationwide tour in September–October promoting their new album with supporting acts the Ghost Inside, Architects and Buried in Verona. Amity appeared on Soundwave in 2013 in February–March and also Warped Tour Australia at the end of the year.

It was announced by Joel Birch on 24 March 2013 that Dan Brown was the new guitarist, although he did not appear on the "Open Letter" music video.

In 2013, The Amity Affliction was part of Warped Tour in the United States with Chad Hasty (Glass Cloud) on drums and percussion due to Ryan Burt severely damaging his cornea during a set in Portland, Oregon. Later in the tour vocalist Joel Birch was also hospitalized due to unspecified illness, forcing the band to cancel their set in Pittsburgh. The band's next show in Cleveland was played due to the help of Sam Carter (Architects), Jason Aalon Butler (Letlive) and Chris Roetter (Like Moths to Flames) sharing the stage as replacement vocals for Joel. All shows after this were played with Joel back on vocals after his recovery.

=== Let the Ocean Take Me (2014–2015) ===
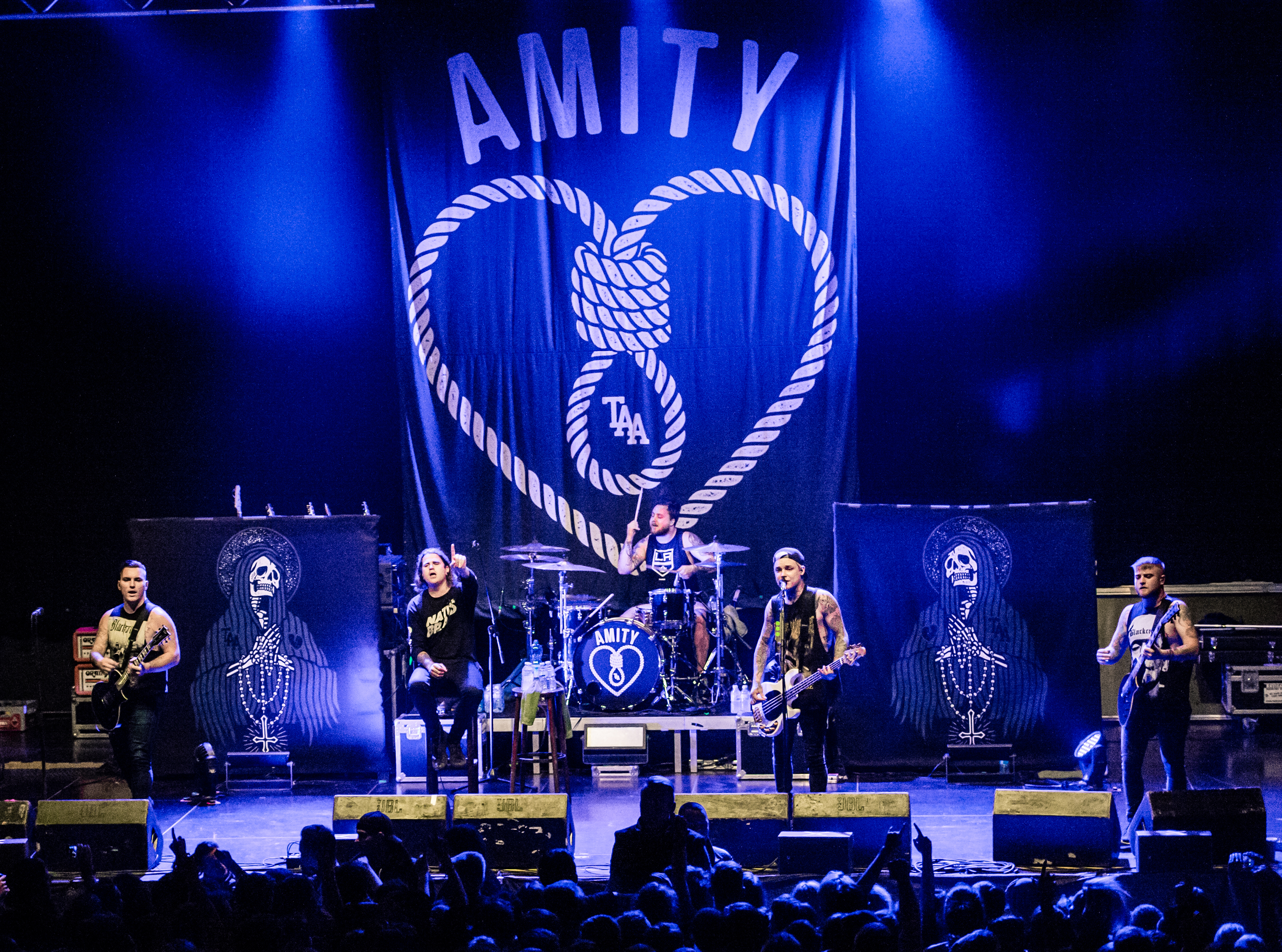
The Amity Affliction playing in Germany in 2015

Late in 2013 the band went on to play the "Brothers in Arms" tour across Europe and Australia with support acts Landscapes and in Hearts Wake for the European portion and Chelsea Grin, Stick to Your Guns and in Hearts Wake for the Australian segment. In late 2013, the band released a demo of the song "Cave In". The single was speculated to be featured on the upcoming album. However, this was proved false when the band announced the track list for their upcoming fourth studio album. The first single from the bands forthcoming album titled "Pittsburgh" was released on 14 April. The second single "Don't Lean on Me" was released on 15 May. The album itself, titled Let the Ocean Take Me, was released on 6 June in Australia, 9 June in the UK, and 10 June in the U.S. it debuted at No. 1 on the Australian ARIA albums chart, becoming the band's second consecutive No. 1.

On 11 October, lead guitarist Troy Brady announced that he had decided to leave the band, making Ahren Stringer the only original member left in the band.

On 18 May 2015, The Amity Affliction released a trailer for their upcoming documentary film titled Seems Like Forever on YouTube. The video description contains links to pre-order the film, released on 10 July 2015 as a stand-alone DVD or a deluxe two-disc edition CD version of Let the Ocean Take Me, including two unreleased tracks, "Skeletons" (featured in the trailer) and "Farewell".

The band played the full Vans Warped Tour, and in October–November 2015 headlined in the U.S. with the "Seems Like Forever U.S. Tour" with Chelsea Grin, Secrets, Cruel Hand and The Plot in You. In mid-November, a new, non-album single "Shine On" was premiered on radio and released digitally without prior announcement. It reached the top five on the Australian iTunes chart and debuted at No. 19 on the ARIA singles chart, the band's highest. The band also co-headlined the "Big Ass Tour" with A Day to Remember, Motionless in White and Hands Like Houses in Australia and New Zealand in December 2015.

=== This Could Be Heartbreak (2016–2017) ===
On 18 May, The Amity Affliction posted a video to their Facebook page announcing their fifth studio album, This Could Be Heartbreak. It was also announced that the album would be released on 12 August and the band also released the music video for the first single, "I Bring the Weather with Me". The song also features clean vocals from Joel Birch. Along with this new album, The Amity Affliction also announced a 1500-person capacity (per city) tour in Australia called the I Bring the Weather with Me Tour at The Tivoli in Brisbane on 19 August, Metro Theatre in Sydney on 26 August and 170 Russell in Melbourne on 31 August. Supporting them on this tour will be Trophy Eyes. They will also tour the United States during September and October and then Europe in December for the record. On 10 July the band released their second single for the album, the title track "This Could Be Heartbreak" along with a music video. On 9 August, the band released a lyric video for the song "All Fucked Up" on YouTube. The band was also featured on the Fearless compilation Punk Goes Pop Vol. 7, covering the Weeknd's song "Can't Feel My Face". A music video for the cover was released on 22 June 2017. The Amity Affliction officially announced that Ryan Burt departed from the band due to mental health reasons on 5 February 2018.

=== Misery (2018–2019) ===
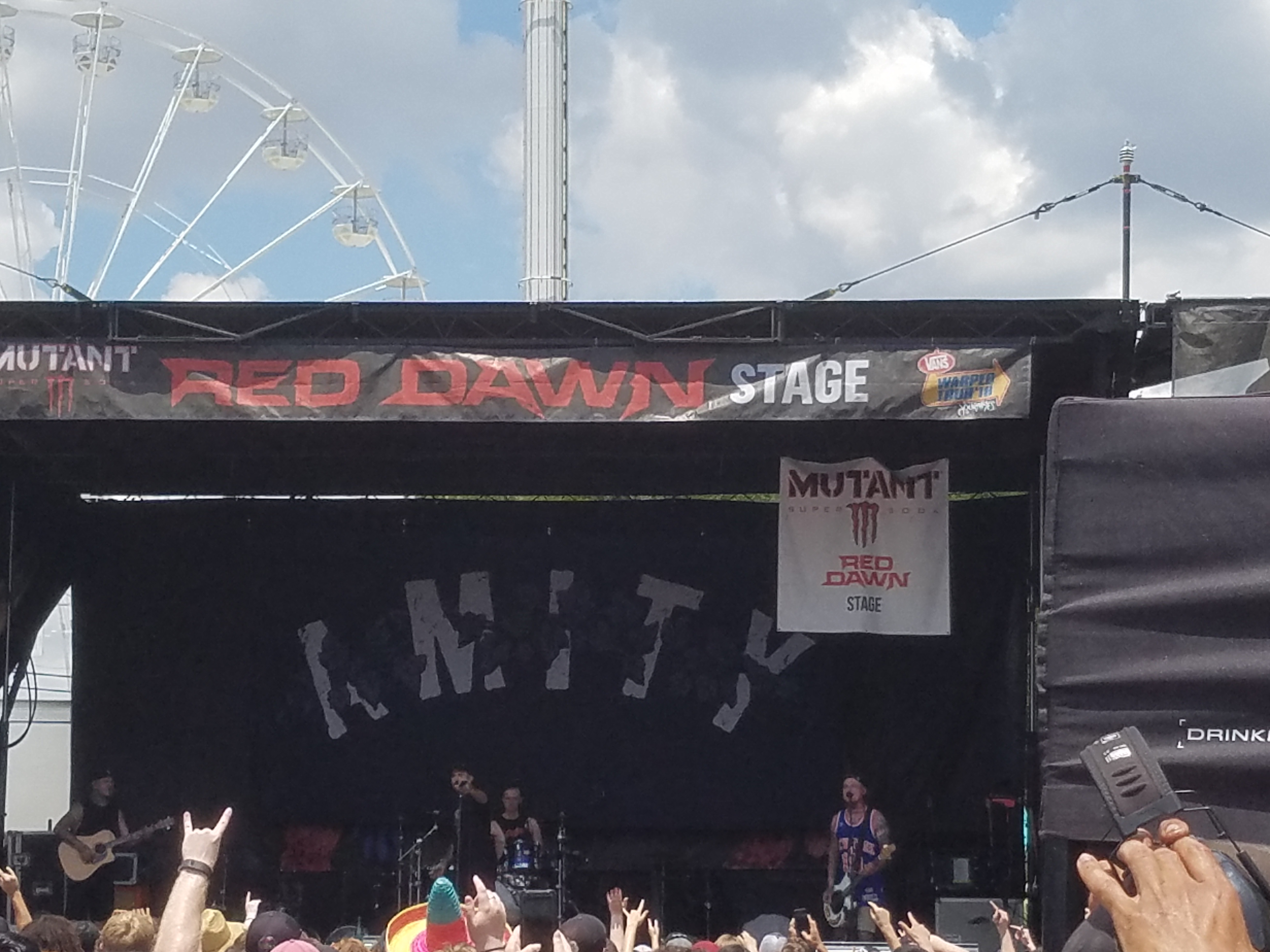
The Amity Affliction performing in 2018

On 20 June 2018, The Amity Affliction released the first single, "Ivy (Doomsday)", from their upcoming sixth studio album, Misery. The band announced that the album will be released on 24 August through Roadrunner Records. The band released an official video along with the release of "Ivy (Doomsday)". The band released the song "Feels Like I'm Dying" as a second part to the "Ivy (Doomsday)" video. The official track listing was eventually revealed on the band's website. It is their fourth consecutive album to reach number one on the Aria Albums Chart.

On 29 January 2019, the band released a music video for "Drag the Lake", the first to feature new drummer Joe Longobardi of Defeater fame, who replaced Ryan Burt after he departed the band back in 2018. In September the band will complete an East Coast Tour of Australia with Underoath, Crossfaith and Pagan.

=== Everyone Loves You... Once You Leave Them (2019–2021) ===
On 6 September 2019, the band released their new song, "All My Friends Are Dead" accompanied with a music video. The song marks a return to the band's heavier elements; it is their first release under Pure Noise Records. On 31 December, it was revealed that the band would be releasing their new album on 21 February after the German version of Amazon accidentally leaked the product listing for the effort. The band have also released a sneak peek of an upcoming track from the album.

On 8 January 2020, the band confirmed their seventh album, Everyone Loves You... Once You Leave Them, would be released on 21 February 2020, along with unveiling the track list for the album. Along with the confirmation of the album they released the second single from the outing, "Soak Me in Bleach", accompanied with a music video.

On 29 January, the band released the next single from the album, "Catatonia", which harks back to their earlier heavier sound. On 20 October, the band released two B-Side songs that didn't make it on their seventh album, Everyone Loves You... Once You Leave Them called "Midnight Train" and "Don't Wade in the Water".

=== Not Without My Ghosts and Stringer's departure (2021–2025) ===
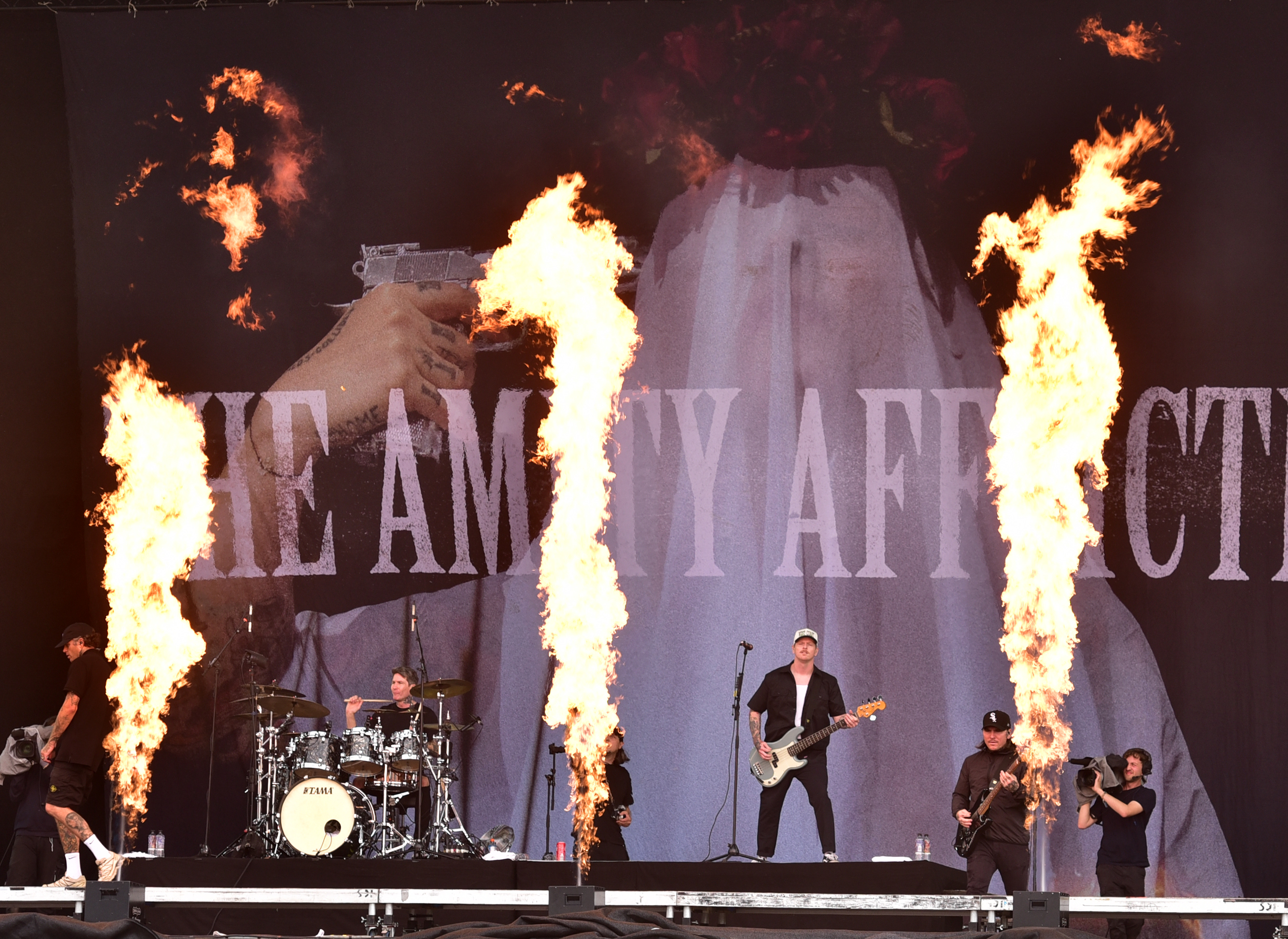
The Amity Affliction at Wacken Open Air 2024.

On 15 September 2021, the band released a brand new single "Like Love" alongside an accompanying music video. On 17 November, a follow-up single titled "Give Up the Ghost" was released. Ahren Stringer told Wall of Sound during an interview: "We are really enjoying playing the heavier stuff again. Seems our audience is happy with that as well…"

On 15 December, the band released "Death Is All Around", the third and final track from their EP Somewhere Beyond the Blue which was released on 15 December 2021 and features unclean vocal performances by both Joel Birch and Ahren Stringer. When discussing the new single, Ahren revealed: "We're deep into a pandemic that won't go away, with lockdowns still happening here in Australia and no touring in sight, it's a hopeless situation and one that inspired the lyrics in this song." On 29 November 2022, the band released unveiled the first single "Show Me Your God" and its corresponding music video. On 13 February 2023, the band published the second single "I See Dead People" featuring Louie Knuxx along with an accompanying music video. On 22 March, the band premiered the third single "It's Hell Down Here" along with a music video. At the same time, they officially announced that their eighth studio album, Not Without My Ghosts, would be released on 12 May 2023 while also revealed the album cover and the track list. On 20 April, one month before the album release, the band released the fourth single and title track "Not Without My Ghosts" featuring Phem.

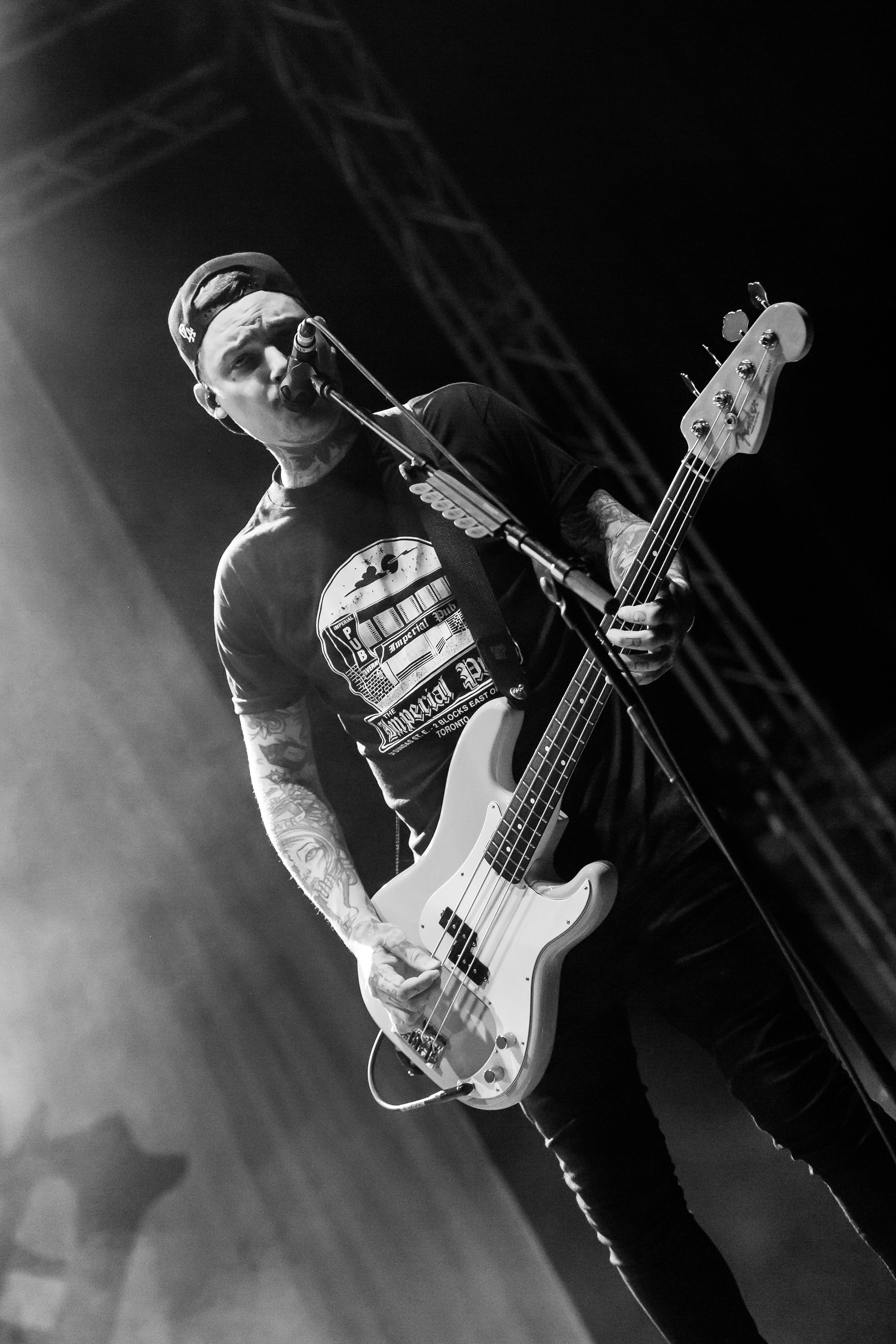
Ahren Stringer (pictured) was fired in February 2025.

On 24 May 2024, it was announced on the band's official Instagram that Stringer would no longer be participating in North American leg of their tour. Tim Beken from True North would be replacing him for the remainder of the tour. On 21 August 2024, the band announced that they would be releasing a re-recorded ("Redux") version of Let the Ocean Take Me. The band also released a re-recorded version of "My Father's Son" as a single along with the announcement. On 2 September 2024, Stringer announced that he would be taking a hiatus in 2025 from the band after the completion of the Australian dates for their Let The Ocean Take Me 10-year anniversary tour. His touring replacement was announced as American musician Jonathan Reeves, best known for his time in the band Kingdom of Giants. On 29 January 2025, Stringer announced he would not be touring with the band at all for the foreseeable future. On 14 February 2025, the band announced that Stringer had been fired from the band, citing "certain behaviours that have been directed at ourselves and those close to us," and they would be continuing as a three-piece. After Stringer's departure, none of the original members remain in the band, with Joel Birch being the longest-standing current member. The following week after the announcement of the split, it was revealed that Birch and Stringer were in a legal battle over a trademark for the name "Amity".

=== House of Cards and Longobardi's departure (2025–present) ===
On 29 May 2025, the band announced that Reeves had joined the band full-time. On the same day, they released a new stand-alone single, "All That I Remember". The band also featured on triple j's Like a Version segment for the first time that day, performing both "All That I Remember" and a cover of Turnstile's "Holiday". The band were joined by Misstiq on keyboards and a string section for the cover, which would later go on to be voted in at number 184 in the station's supplementary Hottest 200 list. Between June and July that year, the band performed as a part of the 2025 edition of Summer of Loud as special guests. Reeves performed two sets on the tour, playing with both The Amity Affliction and Kingdom of Giants. The two bands were joined on the bill by Parkway Drive, Killswitch Engage, Beartooth, I Prevail, The Devil Wears Prada, and Alpha Wolf. In an interview with Valentino Petrarca from The Aquarian Weekly in October 2025, the band confirmed that the title of their finished new album would be House of Cards. On 5 February 2026, the band released the title track and officially announced the album's release date to be 24 April 2026. Guitarist Dan Brown produced the album, marking the first time he has solely done so after co-producing Not Without My Ghosts alongside his bandmates. On June 24, 2026, drummer Joe Longobardi announced he was parting ways with the band.

== Band members ==
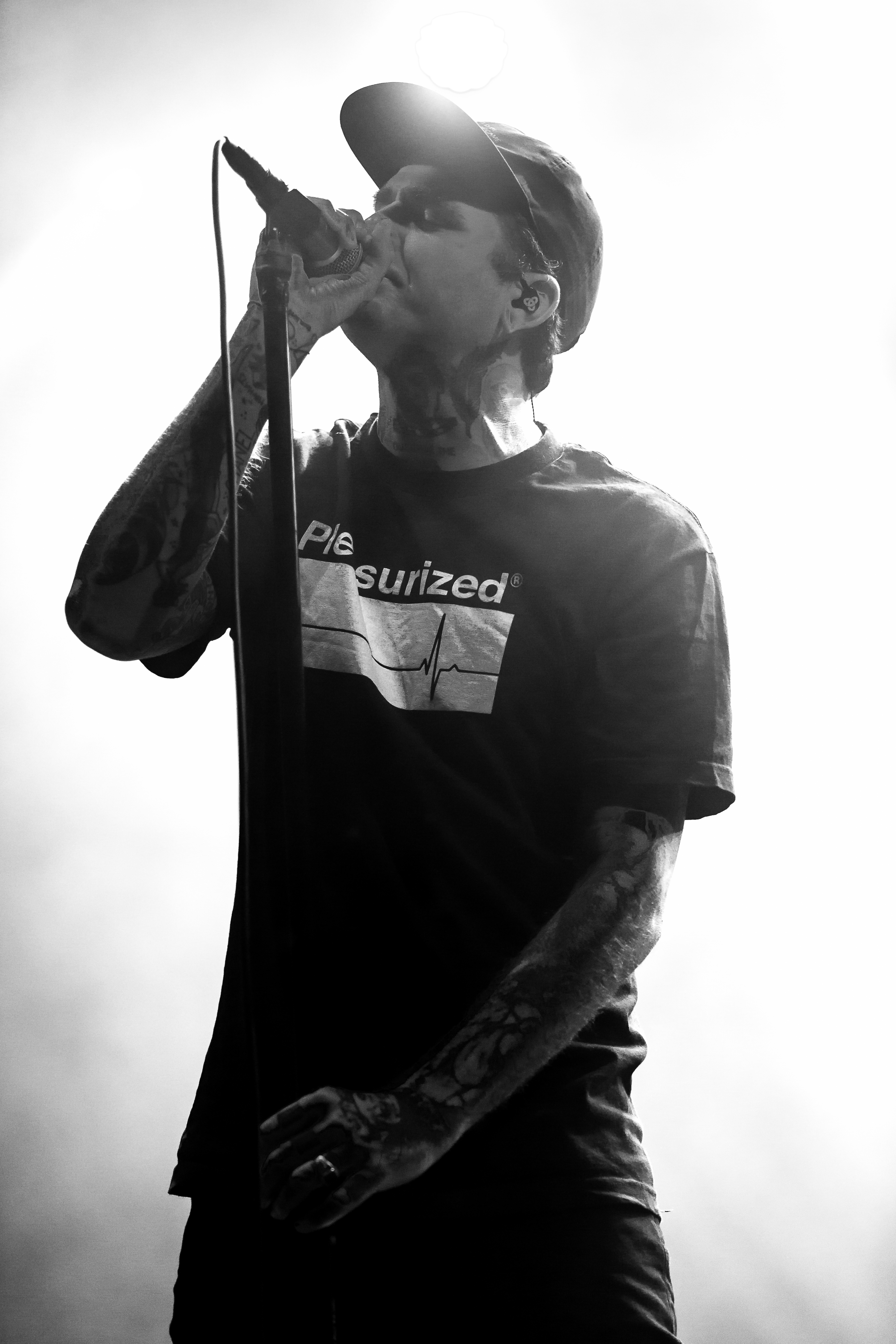
Joel Birch

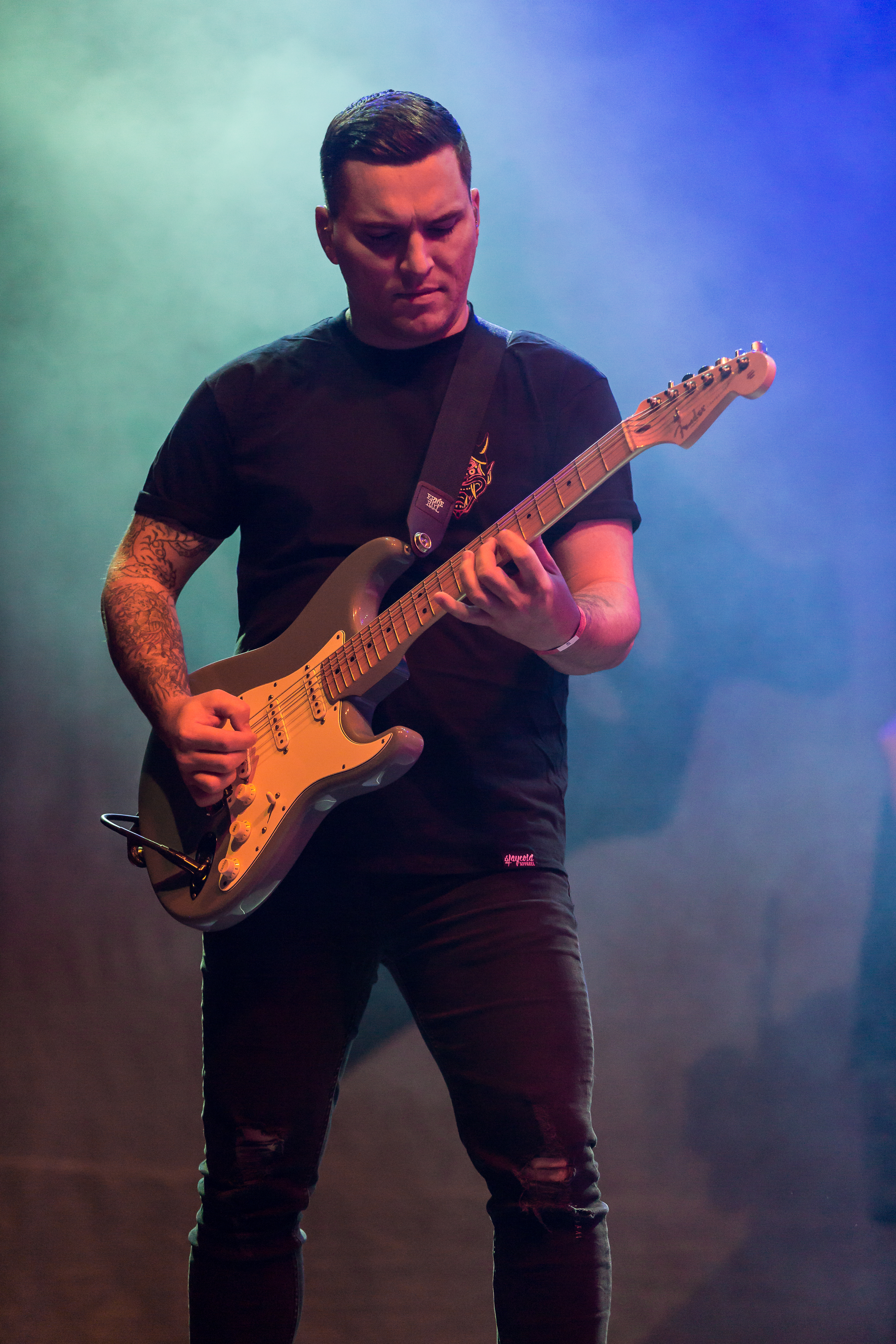
Dan Brown

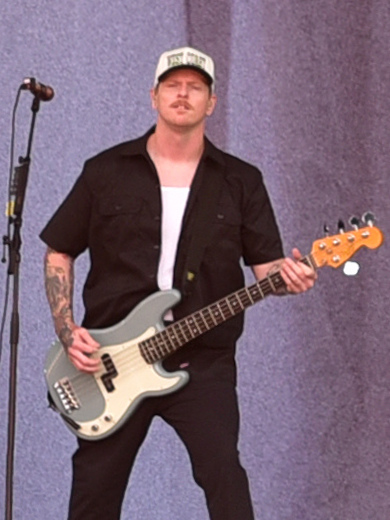
Jonathan Reeves

Current

- Joel Birch – lead vocals (2004–present)
- Dan Brown – guitar, backing vocals (2013–present; touring musician 2012–2013)
- Jonathan Reeves – bass, lead vocals (2025–present; touring musician 2024)

Former

- Ahren Stringer – lead vocals (2003–2025); bass (2007–2025); guitar (2003–2007)
- Troy Brady – guitar (2003–2014); backing vocals (2003–2004)
- Garth Buchanan – bass (2003–2007); backing vocals (2003–2004)
- Lachlan Faulkner – drums, percussion (2003–2005)
- Troels Thomasen – drums, percussion (2005–2008)
- Trad Nathan – keyboards, programming, sampler (2006–2011)
- Chris Burt – guitar (2007–2009); bass (2007)
- Ryan Burt – drums, percussion (2008–2018)
- Clint Owen Ellis – guitar (2009–2011)
- Imran Siddiqi – guitar (2011–2012) (Note: Imran Siddiqi performs on the third album Chasing Ghosts; however, by the time the record was released, he had already left the band.)
- Joe Longobardi – drums, percussion (2018–2026; touring musician 2018)

Touring

- Kyle Yocum – guitar (2015–2017)
- Troy Wright – drums, percussion (2017–2018)
- Casey McHale – drums, percussion (2016–2017, 2018)
- Joseph Arrington – drums, percussion (2018)
- David Parkes – drums, percussion (2024)
- Tim Beken – bass, lead vocals (2024)

Timeline

== Discography ==
Studio albums

- Severed Ties (2008)
- Youngbloods (2010)
- Chasing Ghosts (2012)
- Let the Ocean Take Me (2014)
- This Could Be Heartbreak (2016)
- Misery (2018)
- Everyone Loves You... Once You Leave Them (2020)
- Not Without My Ghosts (2023)
- House of Cards (2026)

== Awards ==
=== AIR Awards ===
The Australian Independent Record Awards (commonly known informally as AIR Awards) is an annual awards night to recognise, promote and celebrate the success of Australia's Independent Music sector.

Year	Nominee / work	Award	Result	Ref.
2025	Let the Ocean Take Me (Redux)	Best Independent Heavy Album or EP	Won	

=== APRA Awards ===
The APRA Awards are several award ceremonies run in Australia by the Australasian Performing Right Association (APRA) to recognise composing and song writing skills, sales and airplay performance by its members annually.

Year	Nominee / work	Award	Result	Ref.
2021	"Soak Me in Bleach"	Most Performed Rock Work	Nominated	
2024	"It's Hell Down Here"	Most Performed Hard Rock / Heavy Metal Work	Nominated	
2026	"All That I Remember	Most Performed Hard Rock / Heavy Metal Work	Nominated	

=== ARIA Music Awards ===
The ARIA Music Awards is an annual awards ceremony that recognises excellence, innovation, and achievement across all genres of Australian music. The Amity Affliction has 5 nominations from this category.

Year	Nominee / work	Award	Result
2010	Youngbloods	Best Hard Rock or Heavy Metal Album	Nominated
2013	Chasing Ghosts	Best Hard Rock or Heavy Metal Album	Nominated
2014	Let the Ocean Take Me	Best Hard Rock or Heavy Metal Album	Nominated
2016	This Could Be Heartbreak	Best Hard Rock or Heavy Metal Album	Nominated
2020	Everyone Loves You... Once You Leave Them	Best Hard Rock or Heavy Metal Album	Nominated
2023	Not Without My Ghosts	Best Hard Rock or Heavy Metal Album	Nominated
2025	Let the Ocean Take Me (Redux)	Best Hard Rock or Heavy Metal Album	Nominated

=== Queensland Music Awards ===
The Queensland Music Awards (previously known as Q Song Awards) are annual awards celebrating Queensland, Australia's brightest emerging artists and established legends. They commenced in 2006.

Year	Nominee / work	Award	Result
2011	The Amity Affliction	The Courier-Mail People's Choice Award Most Popular Group	Won
2013	"Chasing Ghosts"	Heavy Song of the Year	Won
2015	The Amity Affliction	The BOQ People's Choice Award Most Popular Group	Won
2017	The Amity Affliction	Export Achievement Award	Awarded
2017	This Could Be Heartbreak	Highest Selling Album	Won

=== Rolling Stone Australia Awards ===
The Rolling Stone Australia Awards are awarded annually by the Australian edition of Rolling Stone magazine for outstanding contributions to popular culture in the previous year.

Year	Nominee / work	Award	Result	Ref.
2024	Not Without My Ghosts	Best Record	Nominated	
2025	The Amity Affliction	Rolling Stone Global Award	Shortlisted	
