= High Hopes (EP) =

EP by the Amity Affliction
- Released: 1 May 2007
- Genre: Metalcore; post-hardcore
- Length: 18:12
- Label: Skull and Bones

The Amity Affliction chronology
The Amity Affliction (2005)	High Hopes (2007)	Severed Ties (2008)

High Hopes is the third EP by Australian post-hardcore band the Amity Affliction. The first pressing came in a CD/DVD package with subsequent pressings lacking the DVD. It marks a shift in the band's sound, with the addition of keyboard and samples, as well as acoustic sections. On 23 October 2014 the band released the last 500 copies of the EP on their webstore.

== Track listing ==
No.	Title	Length
1.	"I Heart Throbsy"	3:10
2.	"R.I.P. Steggy"	4:19
3.	"Straight Up!"	3:50
4.	"Dong Wayne"	3:11
5.	"Cut It Out"	8:59
Total length:		18:12

== Personnel ==
Credits adapted from the liner notes of High Hopes.

The Amity Affliction

- Joel Birch – vocals, artwork
- Ahren Stringer – vocals, bass
- Troy Brady – lead guitar
- Chris Burt – rhythm guitar
- Trad Nathan – keyboards, synths, programming, samples
- Troels Thomasson – drums, percussion

Additional personnel

- Daniel Field - engineering
- Soundhouse Studios - mixing
- David Neil - mastering

Production

- The Amity Affliction (with assistance from Daniel Field)

== Notes ==
- This is the first release featuring Ahren Stringer on bass guitar, switching from rhythm guitar.
- "Straight Up!" includes content from episode 10 of season 2 of the late 1980s/early 1990s Canadian television series Degrassi High, entitled "Showtime Part 1".
- "R.I.P. Steggy" features an audio clip from the film Training Day at the beginning of the song.
- "Cut It Out" includes content from the film The Butterfly Effect, and in the hidden track after silence from 3:45 to 6:38, a snippet from Degrassi High, "Showtime Part 1" and the following episode, "Showtime Part 2".
