= Everyone Loves You... Once You Leave Them =

Studio album by the Amity Affliction
- Released: 21 February 2020
- Genre: Metalcore; post-hardcore
- Length: 36:26
- Label: Pure Noise
- Producer: Matt Squire

The Amity Affliction chronology
Misery (2018)	Everyone Loves You... Once You Leave Them (2020)	Not Without My Ghosts (2023)

Singles from Everyone Loves You... Once You Leave Them
- 1. "All My Friends Are Dead" Released: 6 September 2019; 2. "Soak Me in Bleach" Released: 8 January 2020; 3. "Catatonia" Released: 29 January 2020; 4. "Forever" Released: 11 August 2020

Everyone Loves You... Once You Leave Them is the seventh studio album by Australian post-hardcore band the Amity Affliction. It was released on 21 February 2020 through Pure Noise Records and was produced by Matt Squire. It is the band's first album release with the label. It is also the first album to feature new drummer Joe Longobardi as an official band member, who replaced Ryan Burt due to his mental health reasons on 5 February 2018. Additionally, Longobardi also performed as a session drummer on the band's sixth studio album Misery.

== Background and promotion ==
On 6 September 2019, the band released their new song, "All My Friends Are Dead" accompanied with a music video. The song marks a return to the band's heavier elements; it is their first release under Pure Noise Records. On 31 December, it was revealed that the band would be releasing their new album on 21 February after the German version of Amazon accidentally leaked the product listing for the effort. The band have also released a sneak peek of an upcoming track from the album.

On 8 January 2020, the band officially confirmed that Everyone Loves You... Once You Leave Them set for a 21 February release date along with unveiling the track list for the album. Along with the confirmation of their forthcoming album they released their second single from the outing, "Soak Me in Bleach" accompanied with a music video.

On 29 January, the band released the next single from their forthcoming album titled "Catatonia" which harks back to their earlier heavy days. On 20 October, the band released two B-Side songs that didn't make it on their seventh album called "Midnight Train" and "Don't Wade in the Water".

== Critical reception ==
Professional ratings
Review scores
Source	Rating
Dead Press!	2/10
Distorted Sound	8/10
Kerrang!	3/5 stars
KillYourStereo	30/100
Rock 'n' Load	8/10
Wall of Sound	8.5/10

The album received polarized reviews from critics. Carlos Zelaya from Dead Press! rated the album negatively, stating: "If The Amity Affliction's mission statement is to induce even more self-hatred within yourself when you listen to them, then fair enough. [...] There are much, much better things to do with your time instead of inflicting this dismal, dreadful album upon yourself." Distorted Sound scored the album 8 out of 10, and said: "New drummer Joe Longobardi has really submerged himself into the band, supplying some amazing prominent rhythms which give the tracks that needed impact and depth. The guitar riffs from Dan Brown and bass from Ahren Stringer are both distinguished, and make for an album that the band should be proud of. Overall, Everyone Loves You… Once You Leave Them has really shown that THE AMITY AFFLICTION are determined to give the fans what they want, whilst also staying true to the vision they have for where they are going in the future." Kerrang! gave the album 3 out of 5, and stated: "It all adds up to an album that doesn't consistently hang together or deliver quite the knockout blows it feels like it should. When they get everything just right, though, here we find some of the best material The Amity Affliction have produced in ages. Coming both so long into their career and following such a left-turn as the last time we saw them, that's a welcome thing indeed."

Alex Sievers from KillYourStereo gave the album 30 out of 100, and said: "Just like a small child throwing on a white sheet to pretend to be a ghost to try and scare all of the grown-ups, I don't take this album seriously at all. Everyone Loves You… Once You Leave Them is a hodgepodge record of what The Amity Affliction has done hitherto; [...] It's the worst parts of Misery frankensteined together with the weakest aspects of what their last few records before that were doing [...] would you say that you liked a two-hour-film when you only enjoyed less than 20 minutes of it? No, exactly, you wouldn't." A reviewer for Rock 'N' Load praised the album, saying, "Everyone Loves You… brings back the heaviness that made the bands early work feel so genuine, while keeping elements of the later sounds that show Amity's growth as musicians across their careers." Wall of Sound scored the album 8.5/10, saying: "If you love Amity's heavier tunes from way back in the day OR if you only jumped on the bandwagon with Misery, there's bound to be something on this album that'll not only catch your attention, but draw you in closer than ever before..."

== Track listing ==
Everyone Loves You... Once You Leave Them track listing
No.	Title	Length
1.	"Coffin"	1:55
2.	"All My Friends Are Dead"	3:47
3.	"Soak Me in Bleach"	3:45
4.	"All I Do Is Sink"	3:34
5.	"Baltimore Rain"	3:27
6.	"Aloneliness"	2:44
7.	"Forever"	3:10
8.	"Just Like Me"	3:37
9.	"Born to Lose"	3:25
10.	"Fever Dream"	3:21
11.	"Catatonia"	3:36
Total length:		36:26

B-sides
No.	Title	Length
1.	"Midnight Train"	3:16
2.	"Don't Wade in the Water"	3:17
Total length:		42:59

== Personnel ==
The Amity Affliction

- Joel Birch – vocals
- Ahren Stringer – vocals, bass
- Dan Brown – guitar
- Joe Longobardi – drums

Additional personnel

- Matt Squire – production

== Charts ==
=== Weekly charts ===
Chart performance for Everyone Loves You... Once You Leave Them
Chart (2020)	Peak position
Australian Albums (ARIA)	2
German Albums (Offizielle Top 100)	47
Scottish Albums (OCC)	53
UK Album Sales (OCC)	52
UK Digital Albums (OCC)	26
UK Physical Albums (OCC)	79
UK Rock & Metal Albums (OCC)	6
UK Independent Albums (OCC)	17
US Billboard 200	60
US Independent Albums (Billboard)	7
US Top Rock Albums (Billboard)	5

=== Year-end charts ===
Chart (2020)	Position
Australian Artist Albums (ARIA)	45
