= Chasing Ghosts (album) =

Studio album by the Amity Affliction
- Released: 7 September 2012
- Genres: Metalcore; post-hardcore
- Length: 41:22
- Labels: UNFD; Roadrunner
- Producer: Michael "Elvis" Baskette

The Amity Affliction chronology
Youngbloods (2010)	Chasing Ghosts (2012)	Let the Ocean Take Me (2014)

Singles from Chasing Ghosts
- 1. "Chasing Ghosts" Released: 10 August 2012; 2. "Open Letter" Released: 30 April 2013; 3. "Born to Die" Released: 11 September 2013

Chasing Ghosts is the third studio album by Australian post-hardcore band the Amity Affliction. It was released on 7 September 2012 worldwide. Roadrunner Records handled the release worldwide. The theme of death and suicide is a centerpiece of the album. The album was influenced by Finch's What It Is to Burn (2002). Chasing Ghosts debuted at No. 1 on the Australian albums chart with 12,911 first week sales, becoming the band's first No. 1 on the chart and being one of the very few rock bands to achieve that position in Australia. Chasing Ghosts was certified Gold by the ARIA for 35,000 shipments in 2013. It is their only record to feature guitarist Imran Siddiqi and the first without keyboardist Trad Nathan.

The title-track and first single from Chasing Ghosts premiered on Alternative Press on 4 July 2012. Commenting on the song, frontman Joel Birch stated, "I wrote Chasing Ghosts as a narrative based wholly around someone that has committed suicide and has passed onto the other side. It's a story that I hope people will see for what it is; an example in song of why you should turn to someone close and talk instead of taking that last fatal step towards death prematurely. I just want to reiterate to people that once you're gone, that's it. There's no ghosts. There's no heaven, no hell, just finality and the wreckage left behind in the wake of their decision."

== Cover art ==
Shortly after this album was announced, the album's cover was revealed. The cover depicts a man hanging from a tree who is thought to have committed suicide. The graphic nature of this image caused much controversy among social media and fans. The situation was very ironic due to the main message behind the album being anti-suicide and urging fans who feel suicidal to turn to people close to them and seeking help rather than taking their own life. In June 2012, The Amity Affliction apologised for "vicious" statements made by the band in response to the controversy. The poster art for the album tour depicted a facsimile of the album with the hanging man missing.

== Track listing ==
Original CD
No.	Title	Length
1.	"Chasing Ghosts"	4:22
2.	"Life Underground"	3:56
3.	"R.I.P. Bon"	3:37
4.	"Open Letter"	4:22
5.	"Greens Avenue"	4:35
6.	"I Heart H.C."	3:57
7.	"Flowerbomb"	4:00
8.	"Pabst Blue Ribbon on Ice"	4:04
9.	"Geof Sux 666"	4:13
10.	"Bondi St. Blues"	4:23
Total length:		41:22

Japanese and iTunes bonus tracks
No.	Title	Length
11.	"Born to Die" (Lana Del Rey cover) (titled "Too Legit to Quit" on some online stores.)	4:11
12.	"Snicklefritz" (Youngbloods b-side)	3:15
13.	"15 Pieces of Flare" (Youngbloods b-side)	4:17

== Personnel ==
The Amity Affliction

- Joel Birch – vocals
- Ahren Stringer – vocals, bass
- Troy Brady – guitar
- Imran Siddiqi – guitar (recorded the album before leaving the band; uncredited)
- Ryan Burt – drums

Additional musicians

- Clint Splattering – guitars on "Snicklefritz" and "15 Pieces of Flare"
- Trad Nathan – keyboards on "Snicklefritz" and "15 Pieces of Flare"

Production

- Michael "Elvis" Baskette – producer, engineer
- Will Putney – mixing, mastering
- Jef Moll – engineer, editing, loop, programming
- Kevin Thomas – assistant engineer
- Randy LeBouf – editing
- Zakk Cervini – additional editing

== Certifications ==
Region	Certification	Certified units/sales
Australia (ARIA)	Gold	35,000^{^}
^{^} Shipments figures based on certification alone.
