= Unify Gathering =

Australian music festival

- Genre: Heavy metal, metalcore, hardcore, punk rock, progressive rock, alternative rock
- Dates: Mid January
- Locations: (Australia) Tarwin Lower, Victoria
- Years active: 2015–2023
- Organiser: RED HILL Entertainment; UNIFIED Music Group; The Hills Are Alive
- Website: www.unifygathering.com

Unify Gathering was an annual Australian music festival held in South Gippsland, Victoria, featuring artists of various genres including rock, metal, and punk. The festival has been discontinued since 2023.

== History ==
Originally started in 2015 as a two-day music and camping festival, the event expanded to three days in 2017; with attendance increasing from 3,000 in 2015 to 5,000 in 2016, and 7,500 for 2017 and 2018. In 2019, the festival moved to a new location in Tarwin Meadows, a short distance away from the previous site at the Tarwin Lower Recreation Reserve. After being forced to cancel the 2021 instalment due to the COVID-19 pandemic, the festival returned in 2022 with an all-Australian lineup. It did not take place in 2023, and was instead replaced by a series of mini-festivals titled Unify Off The Record held in Mackay, Adelaide, Wollongong, Hobart and Frankston from May to June.

== Artist lineups by year ==
=== 2015 ===
Saturday, 10 January

- The Amity Affliction
- Northlane
- In Hearts Wake
- Thy Art Is Murder
- Deez Nuts
- Buried in Verona
- Antagonist AD
- Storm the Sky
- Aversions Crown
- Stories
- Earth Caller

Sunday, 11 January

- Break Even
- Confession
- Hand of Mercy
- Hellions
- Endless Heights

=== 2016 ===
Saturday, 16 January

- Parkway Drive
- In Hearts Wake
- Tonight Alive
- Stray from the Path (USA)
- Hands Like Houses
- Dream On, Dreamer
- Make Them Suffer
- Hellions
- Ocean Grove
- Stories
- Void of Vision

Sunday, 17 January

- Neck Deep (UK)
- State Champs (USA)
- Trophy Eyes
- Columbus
- The Weight of Silence

=== 2017 ===
Friday, 13 January

- Northlane
- Every Time I Die (USA)
- Letlive (USA)
- The Getaway Plan (Note: The Getaway Plan performed their debut album, Other Voices, Other Rooms in full.)
- House vs. Hurricane
- Ocean Grove
- Counterparts (CAN)
- King Parrot
- Polaris
- Columbus
- Justice for the Damned
- Ocean Sleeper

Saturday, 14 January

- Alexisonfire (CAN)
- Violent Soho
- Thy Art Is Murder
- Bodyjar (Note: Bodyjar replaced I Killed the Prom Queen, who withdrew from the lineup. I Killed the Prom Queen were originally announced to perform their album 'Music for the Recently Deceased' in full.)
- Storm the Sky
- Luca Brasi
- Trophy Eyes
- Moose Blood (UK)
- Deez Nuts
- Saviour
- The Dirty Nil (CAN)
- The Brave
- Drown This City
- Bare Bones
- Pagan

Sunday, 15 January (Acoustic Sunday Session)

- Little Brother (John Floreani of Trophy Eyes)
- Marcus Bridge (of Northlane)
- William Jarrat (of Storm the Sky)
- Shontay Snow (of Saviour)
- Alex Moses (of Columbus)

=== 2018 ===
Friday, 12 January

- Parkway Drive
- Architects (UK)
- Tonight Alive
- Four Year Strong (USA)
- Behind Crimson Eyes
- 50 Lions
- Polaris
- Knocked Loose (USA)
- Belle Haven
- Sienna Skies
- Mirrors

Saturday, 13 January

- The Amity Affliction
- Hands Like Houses
- Hellions
- Stick To Your Guns (USA)
- Knuckle Puck (USA)
- Make Them Suffer
- Being As An Ocean (USA)
- ROAM (UK)
- Void of Vision
- Cursed Earth
- Young Lions
- Outright
- Introvert
- Dear Seattle
- The Beautiful Monument
- Save The Clocktower
- Arteries
- Dregg

Sunday, 14 January (Acoustic Sunday Session)

- Young Lions
- Introvert
- Chasing Ghosts
- Brae Fisher (of Dear Seattle)
- Belle Haven

=== 2019 ===
Friday, 11 January

- Underoath (USA)
- Karnivool
- In Hearts Wake
- Hellions
- Ocean Grove
- While She Sleeps (UK)
- Crossfaith (JAP)
- Dream On Dreamer
- The Plot In You (USA)
- Hand Of Mercy
- Dream State (UK)
- Drown This City
- Ocean Sleeper
- Better Half

Saturday, 12 January

- Taking Back Sunday (USA)
- Every Time I Die (USA)
- Trophy Eyes
- State Champs (USA)
- Turnstile (USA)
- Citizen (USA)
- Waax
- Clowns
- Endless Heights
- Harms Way (USA)
- Saviour
- Stand Atlantic
- Thornhill
- Pagan
- Gravemind
- After Touch
- Falcifer
- Yours Truly

=== 2020 ===
Friday, 10 January

- Architects (UK)
- Northlane
- Silverstein (CAN)
- Make Them Suffer
- Dear Seattle
- Antagonist A.D. (NZ)
- Tired Lion
- The Beautiful Monument
- Between You and Me
- Diamond Construct
- Tapestry

Saturday, 11 January

- The Ghost Inside (USA)
- Polaris
- Tonight Alive
- Stray from the Path (USA)
- Void of Vision
- Knocked Loose (USA)
- Kublai Khan (USA)
- Eat Your Heart Out
- The Brave
- Columbus
- Sleep Talk
- Caged Existence
- Something Something Explosion

=== 2022 ===
Thursday, 10 January (AM//PM Pre-Party)

- Alt
- Dregg
- Drown This City
- Rumours
- Grenade Jumper

Friday, 11 January

- The Amity Affliction
- Trophy Eyes (Note: Trophy Eyes performed their album, Chemical Miracle in full.)
- Ocean Grove
- Waax
- Gravemind
- Plini
- Teen Jesus and the Jean Teasers
- Dream On, Dreamer
- Bloom
- Banks Arcade
- To Octavia
- Wildheart

Saturday, 12 January

- Violent Soho
- Slowly Slowly
- Thornhill
- Yours Truly
- Stories (Note: This was Stories' first performance since the band broke up in 2015.)
- Teenage Joans
- Bugs
- Short Stack
- Mirrors
- Stepson
- RedHook
- Pridelands
- Starve
- The Last Martyr
- Future Static

Sunday, 13 January (Maton Acoustic Sunday Sessions)

- Ben Stewart (Slowly Slowly)
- Bugs
- Alex Moses (Columbus)
- Joshua O'Donnell (Banks Arcade)

=== 2023 ===
Saturday, 20 May (at Seabreeze, Mackay)

- Thornhill
- Void of Vision
- Young Lions
- Wildheart
- Arcade Stories

Friday, 26 May (at Hindley Street Music Hall, Adelaide)

- Teenage Joans
- Thornhill
- Ocean Grove
- Yours Truly
- The Beautiful Monument
- Alt
- The Last Martyr
- Wildheart

Saturday, 27 May (at Uni Bar, Wollongong)

- Thy Art Is Murder
- Make Them Suffer
- Ocean Grove
- Yours Truly
- Fit for an Autopsy
- Bloom
- Banks Arcade
- Reliqa
- Alienist
- Raised as Wolves

Thursday, 1 June (at Odeon Theatre, Hobart)

- Alpha Wolf
- In Hearts Wake
- Void of Vision
- RedHook
- Offset Vision

Friday, 2 June (at The Pier, Frankston)

- Northlane
- In Hearts Wake
- Make Them Suffer
- RedHook
- Fit for an Autopsy
- Ocean Sleeper
- Mirrors
- Chasing Ghosts
- Banks Arcade
- Future Static

== See also ==
- List of Australian music festivals
