= Invasion Fest =

Australian music festival

- Genre: Heavy metal; hardcore; metalcore; deathcore; punk rock
- Dates: December–February; September
- Locations: Australia; Melbourne (2012–2019); Gold Coast (2013); Sydney (2020)
- Years active: 2012–2020
- Founders: Ash Hull
- Website: facebook.com/invasionfestaustralia

Invasion Fest was an all-ages heavy metal music festival held primarily in Melbourne, and occasionally in other major cities around Australia. It showcased smaller and emerging Australian bands within the heavy scene that wouldn't normally have the opportunity to play such large shows or venues, alongside larger international and Australian acts.

== 2012 ==
The initial year of Invasion Fest had 2 events, one in February and one in November. The February event was held at Ringwood OLP, and the November event was held at the Lilydale Showgrounds shed.

=== Lineups ===
Saturday, 25 February

- Lovers Grave
- Hallower
- The Storm Picturesque
- Glorified
- Saviour
- Belle Haven
- The Ocean The Sky
- Anchored
- Storm the Sky
- Graveyard
- Surrender

Sunday, 25 November

- Dream On, Dreamer
- Northlane
- Make Them Suffer
- In Fear and Faith (US)
- The Bride
- Saviour
- Prepared Like a Bride
- Belle Haven
- Thorns
- Exposures

== 2013 ==
In 2013, the festival expanded to include the Gold Coast, albeit with a slightly different lineup to the Melbourne event. The Melbourne event was held at St Johns Parish in Mitcham, and the Gold Coast event was held at Expressive Grounds. The Melbourne event was the first show for the band Sentinel, and the final show for the band Brooklyn.

=== Lineups ===
Melbourne
Saturday, 14 September

- ~~For the Fallen Dreams (US)~~ ^{[A]}
- The Plot in You (US)
- Hand of Mercy
- Storm the Sky
- Fit for a King (US)
- Brooklyn
- Glorified
- Belle Haven
- Graveyards
- Sierra
- Jack the Stripper
- I, Valiance
- The Evercold
- Left For Wolves
- Sentinel

Gold Coast
Sunday, 22 September

- Northlane
- ~~For the Fallen Dreams (US)~~ ^{[A]}
- The Plot in You (US)
- Hand of Mercy
- Saviour
- Aversions Crown
- Storm the Sky
- Fit for a King (US)
- The Lane Cove
- Emerald Vale
- Hand of the Architect
- Take Us to Vegas

Notes *A For the Fallen Dreams withdrew from the lineup due to vocalist Chad Ruhlig suffering a motorcycle accident.

== 2015 ==
After skipping a year, Invasion Fest returned to a single event format in Melbourne for 2015. The event was held at Arrow on Swanston, and sponsored by KillYourStereo.com.

=== Lineup ===
Saturday, 5 December

- Hellions
- Hallower
- Ocean Grove
- Void of Vision
- I, Valiance
- Graves
- Vices
- Jack the Stripper
- Imprisoned
- Free World
- Polaris
- Reactions
- Justice for the Damned
- She Cries Wolf
- Ambleside
- Daybreak
- Overpower

== 2016 ==
The 2016 event was held at Arrow on Swanston. This was the final show for the band Sentinel.

=== Lineup ===
Saturday, 10 December

- Ocean Grove
- Relentless
- Kublai Khan (US)
- Reactions
- Graves
- Harbours
- Polaris
- Rebirth
- Justice for the Damned
- Cursed Earth
- Belle Haven
- Our Past Days
- Sentinel
- Stepson
- Hindsight
- Staunch
- Iconoclast
- Dregg
- Blinded

== 2017 ==
The 2017 event was held at Arrow on Swanston, and sponsored by KillYourStereo.com and Hysteria Magazine.

=== Lineup ===
Saturday, 9 December

- The Acacia Strain (US)
- Kublai Khan (US)
- Aburden
- Alpha Wolf
- Broken
- Cursed Earth
- Deadlights
- Endless Heights
- Eat Your Heart Out
- Honest Crooks
- Justice for the Damned
- Outright
- Reactions
- Sleep Talk
- Stepson
- Void of Vision

== 2020 ==
After a 2 year hiatus, the festival returned in 2020 and was held at The Metro Theatre in Sydney, rather than Melbourne. It was once again sponsored by Hysteria Magazine. This was The Red Shore's first performance in over a decade.

=== Lineup ===
- Knocked Loose (US)
- The Red Shore
- Terror (US)
- Alpha Wolf
- Justice for the Damned
- Jesus Piece (US)
- Malevolence (UK)
- Bloom
- Caged Existence
- Crave Death
- Daybreak
- Diamond Construct
- Falcifer
- Gravemind
- Homesick
- Honest Crooks
- Sleep Talk
