= Ocean Sleeper =

Australian metalcore band

- Origin: Gippsland, Victoria, Australia
- Genres: Post-hardcore, metalcore
- Years active: 2016–present
- Members: Karl Spiessl; Ionei Heckenberg; Stan Liagourdis

Ocean Sleeper are an Australian metalcore band based out of Gippsland, Victoria, established in 2016. Their second studio album Peace When I'm Dead peaked within the ARIA Chart top ten.

== History ==
The band was established in 2016 and they hail from the Gippsland region in southeastern Australia. Ocean Sleeper was formed with lead vocalist and frontman Karl Spiessl, guitarist and backing vocalist Ionei Heckenberg, guitarist Stan Liagourdis and drummer Jarred Robson. The quartet's first song, "Breaking Free", was included on their debut EP Six Feet Down, released in early 2017. Six Feet Down received positive reviews.

In 2018, Ocean Sleeper joined Justice for the Damned as opening acts on tour through Australia with Killswitch Engage as the headliners. After the tour, the band released the song "Save Me" as well as its accompanying video before embarking on a headline tour of Australia supported by the Vita Music Group.

In February and March of 2019, Ocean Sleeper were the supporting act for a tour co-headlined by The Getaway Plan and Dream On Dreamer. In June 2019, Ocean Sleeper released the single "Hate Me Like You Mean It". Ocean Sleeper recorded in the United States with producer Kris Crummett, and as 2019 was concluding, they issued their first album, Don't Leave Me This Way, and released a music video for "Killing Me".

In February 2020, Ocean Sleeper supported Atreyu on tour in Australia. In 2021, Ocean Sleeper released the single "Forever Sinking". The song outlines the mindset of a person with mental health struggles trying to function in the day-to-day world as it was during COVID-19 pandemic.

In June 2022, the band released "Your Love I'll Never Need" ahead of their second EP, Is It Better Feeling Nothing. The EP was supported with an Australia tour.

In May and June of 2023, Ocean Sleeper became the opening act for the Neverbloom 10th Anniversary Tour with Make Them Suffer as the headliners and Fit for an Autopsy as a supporting act. During that time, Ocean Sleeper released the single "Never the One". In June 2023, Ocean Sleeper issued the track "Tourniquet" and during August and September, the band headlined the Never the One East Coast Tour, supported by Stepson and Harroway. In December 2023m Ocean Sleeper participated in the Good Things festival in Brisbane.

On 9 June 2026, the band announced their second album, Peace When I'm Dead, which was released on 28 August 2026.

== Band members ==
- Karl Spiessl – vocals
- Ionei Heckenberg – guitars/vocals
- Stan Liagourdis – guitar
- Daniel Stivens – live drummer

== Discography ==
=== Albums ===
List of albums, with selected chart positions
Title	Album details	Peak chart positions
Title	Album details	AUS
Don't Leave Me This Way	Released: 2019; Label: BMG/Warner	—
Peace When I'm Dead	Released: 28 August 2026; Label: BMG/UMA	7

=== Extended plays ===
List of EPs, with selected details
Title	Details
Six Feet Down	Released: 2017; Label: Six Feet Down
Is It Better Feeling Nothing	Released: August 2022; Label: Six Feet Down / BMG
Maybe Death Is All I Need	Released: October 2024; Label: Six Feet Down / BMG
