= Heartbound =

Studio album by Dream On, Dreamer
- Released: 3 August 2011 Japan; 5 August 2011 Australia; 9 August 2011 US/Europe/UK
- Genre: Post-hardcore, metalcore
- Length: 35:13
- Label: Rise; We Are Unified; Triple Vision
- Producer: Cameron Mizell

Dream On, Dreamer chronology
Hope - EP (2010)	Heartbound (2011)	Loveless (2013)

Singles from Heartbound
- 1. "Downfall" Released: 5 July 2011

Professional ratings
Review scores
Source	Rating
Audiopinions	10/10 stars
Rockfreaks.net	7/10 stars

Heartbound is the debut album by Australian post-hardcore band Dream On, Dreamer. It was released in Australia (We Are Unified) on 5 August, in Japan (Triple Vision) on 3 August and in the US/Europe/UK (Rise) on 9 August 2011.

== Background ==
The album has spawned one single so far entitled, "Downfall". A music video has also been made to coincide with the song. A second song, "Come Home True Love", was posted on themusic.com.au the last week of July.

== Track listing ==
No.	Title	Length
1.	"I"	0:41
2.	"Yourself as Someone Else"	3:37
3.	"Downfall"	4:05
4.	"A Path of Its Own"	2:40
5.	"For What You Believe In"	4:00
6.	"Taking Chances, Breaking Free"	3:09
7.	"Blinded"	3:22
8.	"To the Lost" (featuring Matthew Wright of The Getaway Plan)	4:49
9.	"Come Home True Love"	3:48
10.	"Lifestream"	4:57
Total length:		35:13

Deluxe Edition Reissue
No.	Title	Length
1.	"Midnight Thoughts"	3:33
2.	"A Thousand Miles" (Vanessa Carlton cover)	4:15
3.	"I"	0:41
4.	"Yourself as Someone Else"	3:37
5.	"Downfall"	4:05
6.	"A Path of Its Own"	2:40
7.	"For What You Believe In"	4:00
8.	"Taking Chances, Breaking Free"	3:09
9.	"Blinded"	3:22
10.	"To the Lost" (featuring Matthew Wright of The Getaway Plan)	4:49
11.	"Come Home True Love"	3:48
12.	"Lifestream"	4:57
Total length:		43:02

== Personnel ==
=== Dream On, Dreamer ===
- Marcel Gadacz – unclean vocals
- Michael McLeod – bass guitar, clean vocals
- Callan Orr – lead guitar
- Luke Domic – rhythm guitar
- Daniel Jungwirth – keyboards, synthesizers, piano, programming
- Aaron Fiocca – drums

=== Production ===
- Produced, engineered, mixed and mastered by Cameron Mizell
- Co written by Kevin Orr
- Artwork & Design by Ken Taylor
- A&R by Luke Logemann
