= The Brave (band) =

Australian band

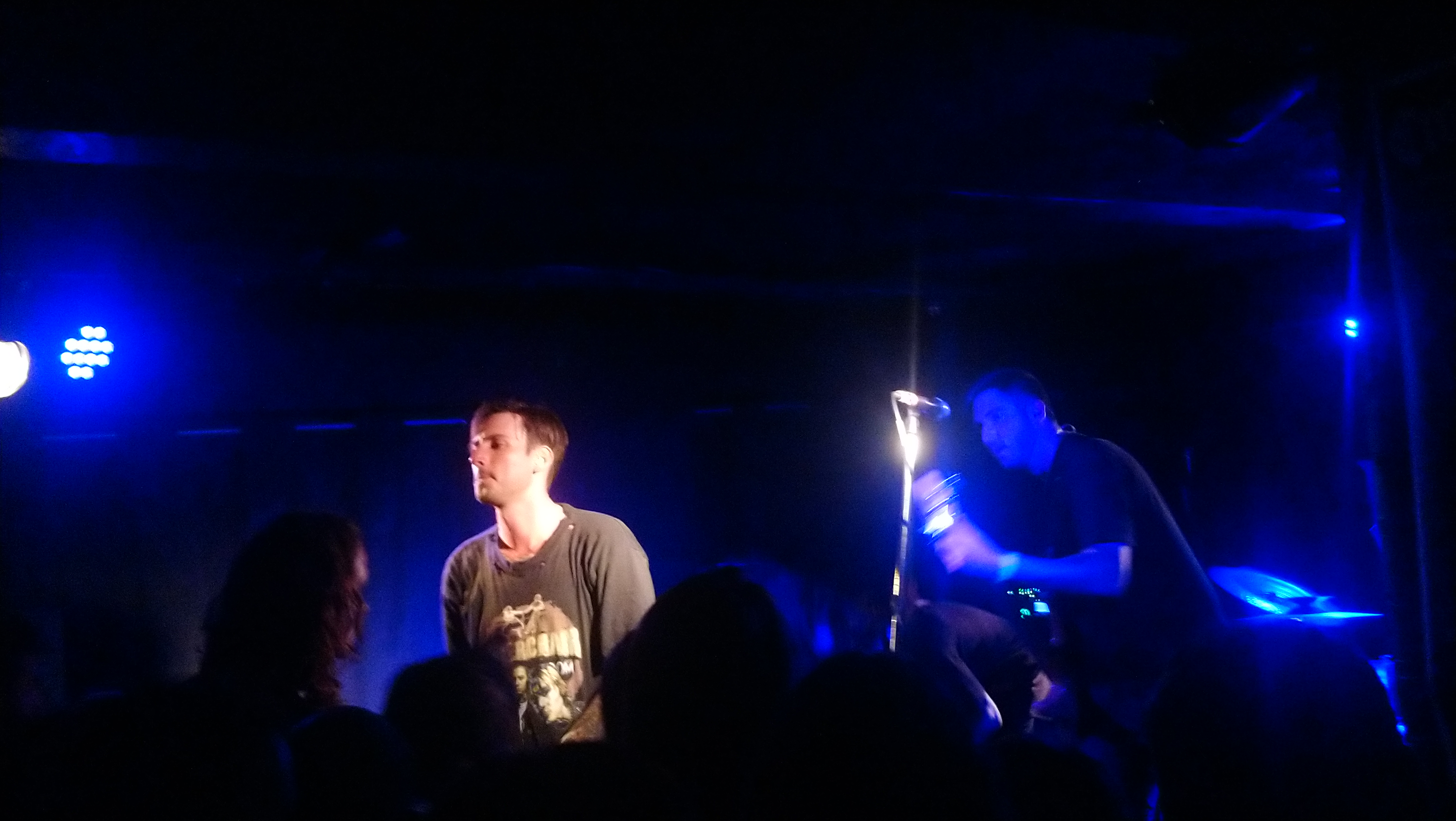
- The Brave performing in 2019

Background information
- Origin: Brisbane, Queensland, Australia
- Genres: Metalcore; hardcore; post-hardcore
- Years active: 2013–2020; 2023–present
- Labels: UNFD; Rise
- Members: Nathan Toussaint; Kurt Thomson; Daniel Neucom; Brent Thomson; Denham Lee
- Past members: Dave Mead
- Website: thebraveofficial.com

The Brave are an Australian metalcore band from Brisbane, formed in 2013. The band consists of guitarists Kurt Thomson and Denham Lee, drummer Brent Thomson, bassist Daniel Neucom, and vocalist Nathan Toussaint. They have released two studio albums: Epoch (2016), and Aura (2019).

== History ==
=== Formation and early years (2013–2014) ===
The Brave were formed in May 2013 by Kurt Thomson on lead guitar, Dave Mead on rhythm guitar, an unidentified individual on drums, Daniel Neucom on bass guitar, and Nathan Toussaint on vocals. Toussaint whose previous bad had broken up wished to form a new band, getting together with his drummer friend (whose band also broke up), they recruited Mead, Thomson, and Neucom as guitarists and bassist respectively. Toussaint's drummer friend, unable to commit for personal reasons left the band at an early stage. They later recruited Kurt's brother Brent as their drummer. Their debut single "Pages" was released on 3 November to Bandcamp. Their first live show was held near the end of 2013 in Brisbane, they played as support for American rock band Dance Gavin Dance.

Their sophomore and third singles "Hundred" and "Dream Chasers" were released on 3 March and 18 May 2014 respectively. They then released their debut EP Endless on 9 September and quickly gathered a large following of fans. The tracks "Bright Eyes" and "Wake Me Up" was also released as singles. They then went on perform more live shows, sharing the stage with bands such as In Hearts Wake and Dream On, Dreamer. Which then garnered them more fans and gained the attention of UNFD owner Luke Logemann.

=== Record label and Epoch (2015–2016) ===
On 21 February 2015, the band performed as a support act during Never Lose Sight's farewell tour. On 27 May, The Brave held a show with I Met the Maker and Endless performing as support for them. On 8 September, to celebrate the first anniversary of their EP Endless, the band offered hard copies of it. On 26 December, The Brave performed at the Bring it On Party supporting Deadlights.

On 28 March 2016, two days before officially signing onto to the record label UNFD, the band unveiled their new single "Searchlight" via a mystery email blast. The emails contained the hashtag "#UNFDEasterEgg" leading people to begin speculation as who the new member of the UNFD label was. on 30 March, they were officially announced to be a part of the UNFD label. Vocalist Nathan Toussaint shared his excitement about signing onto UNFD, saying that he was "beyond stoked" and that he "never thought that it would take [the band] to the point of getting signed let alone signing [sic] to a label like UNFD." The Brave then went on tour to promote their single "Searchlight" on 22, 28, and 30 April. All shows were for over-18s only. On 12 May, their second single since signing "Escape" was released. Their third single to be included on their debut album, "Break Free", was released on 9 June. Their debut studio album Epoch was announced on 1 July and later released on 5 August by UNFD. The track "Dreamless" contains guest vocals from Marcus Bridge, lead vocalist of UNFD labelmate Northlane. The track "Ignited Youth" contains themes concerning the human cost of global conflict. In October, the band joined Falling in Reverse as support for their first Australian tour since 2015. In November, they joined Northlane on tour in New Zealand as a supporting act on their Intuition Tour. On 14 November, the band performed at Unify Gathering 2017. On 25 November, The Brave's track "Dreamless" featuring Marcus Bridge was included on the compilation album UNIFY 2017: A Heavy Music Compilation.

=== Mead's departure and Aura (2017–2020) ===
On 2 August 2017, The Brave released their new single "Ethereal", later announced to be included on their upcoming album. "Ethereal" addresses the band's view on the world set on destroying itself. On 8 November, the band recorded a rendition of the 1997 song "Cemetery" by Silverchair for Spawn (Again): A Tribute To Silverchair, a tribute album to Silverchair. On 25 November, The Brave headlined The New Noise 2017, a free all-ages music event hosted by UNFD.

On 14 May 2018, The Brave won the category of "Best Heavy Song" at the Queensland Music Awards for their single "Ethereal". Sometime before June, guitarist Dave Mead left the band for unknown reasons. His replacement, Denham Lee, was announced on 19 June before playing with the band in August at their first show of 2018 in Brisbane.

On 7 February 2019, The Brave announced their sophomore studio album Aura, later released on 5 April. A tour to promote the album's newest single "Technicolor" was also announced, Melbourne rock band Windwaker will join The Brave. Toussaint describes "Technicolor" as "...about one of [his] first experiences of getting a little too loose when [he] was young." On 6 March, the band released their newest single, "Desolation", to also be included on their forthcoming album, Aura. It was premiered on Triple J's Short.Fast.Loud segment. On 4 April, the band released a music video for their track "Burn", a day before releasing their sophomore studio album Aura. On 7 July, The Brave played an all ages show, The Big Bris 4, alongside other Brisbane bands Deadlights, She Cries Wolf, and Stepson. On 26 July, to celebrate their Aura Tour, the band released a reimagined version of the title track "Aura". The Aura Tour will take place in August, Melbourne band Pridelands is set to join them at all but two shows. The bands supporting them were Statues, Patient Sixty-Seven, Fadeaway, Hercules Morse, Worlds Apart, The Light the Dark, Earthbound, Washed Away, Emecia, Heartline, Mirrors, Isotopes, and Days Like These.

On 9 and 12 January 2020, The Brave performed at Unify Gathering 2020 despite the alleged risk of bushfires. They then later announced and performed The Break Out Tour from late February until early April, continuing to ride the hype from Aura. They were join on the tour by Sleep Talk, Bad/Love, and To Octavia. On 18 February, the band teased a cover of "Song 2" by Blur announcing that it would be played at their upcoming tour performances. The cover was officially released as a single on 29 May. The band's Brisbane performance had to be postponed until 4 September due to the then-ongoing COVID-19 pandemic.

=== Return to touring (2023–present) ===
After an unannounced hiatus of three years, the band revealed on their social media in May 2023 that they've since reunited and planned on releasing new music. In September, to celebrate the 10th anniversary of their debut EP Endless, the band announced two limited edition vinyl pressings from Summit Distro.

The Brave later released their first single in nearly 5 years, "Breaking Out", alongside an accompanying music video in November 2024. Tour dates supporting In Hearts Wake were also announced for early-2025. The Brave performed at the first four shows with Reliqa later replacing them for the remaining shows.

== Musical style ==
The Brave's genre has been categorised as hardcore, post-hardcore, and metalcore. Their debut EP Endless was described as taking influences from Bring Me the Horizon, While She Sleeps and Underoath. The Brave lists these bands as influences to their sound, as well as Linkin Park, Northlane, and Architects. Frontman Nathan Toussaint also lists Incubus and Slipknot as major influences in his life as well.

== Members ==
Current

- Nathan Toussaint – lead vocals (2013–present)
- Kurt Thomson – lead guitar (2013–present)
- Denham Lee – rhythm guitar (2018–present)
- Daniel Neucom – bass (2013–present)
- Brent Thomson – drums (2013–present)

Former

- Dave Mead – rhythm guitar (2013–2018)

Timeline

== Discography ==
=== Studio albums ===
List of studio albums
| Title | EP details | Peak chart positions |
| Title | EP details | AUS |
|---|---|---|
| Epoch | Released: 5 August 2016; Label: UNFD; Format: CD, digital download, streaming | – |
| Aura | Released: 5 April 2019; Label: UNFD, Rise (NA); Format: CD, LP, digital download, streaming | – (Note: Aura did not enter the Top 100, but peaked at number 42 on the ARIA Digital Albums Chart.) |

=== Extended plays ===
List of extended plays
| Title | EP details |
|---|---|
| Endless | Released: 9 September 2014; Label: Self-released; Format: CD, Digital download, EP |

=== Singles ===
| Title | Year | Album |
|---|---|---|
| "Pages" | 2013 | Non-album singles |
| "Hundred" | 2014 | Non-album singles |
| "Dream Chasers" | 2014 | Non-album singles |
| "Bright Eyes" | 2014 | Endless |
| "Wake Me Up" | 2014 | Endless |
| "Searchlight" | 2016 | Epoch |
| "Escape" | 2016 | Epoch |
| "Break Free" | 2016 | Epoch |
| "Ethereal" | 2017 | Aura |
| "Technicolor" | 2019 | Aura |
| "Desolation" | 2019 | Aura |
| "Aura (Reimagined)" | 2019 | Non-album singles |
| "Song 2" (Blur cover) | 2020 | Non-album singles |
| "Breaking Out" | 2024 | Non-album singles |

=== Album appearances ===
List of album appearances
| Title | Year | Album |
|---|---|---|
| "Dreamless" (featuring Marcus Bridge) | 2016 | UNIFY 2017: A Heavy Music Compilation |
| "Cemetery" | 2017 | Spawn (Again): A Tribute to Silverchair |

=== Music videos ===
| Year | Song | Director |
|---|---|---|
| 2016 | "Searchlights" | Jason Eshraghian |
| 2016 | "Dreamless" (featuring Marcus Bridge) | Jason Eshraghian |
| 2017 | "Ethereal" | Adrian Eyre |
| 2019 | "Technicolor" | Colin Jeffs |
| 2019 | "Burn" | Colin Jeffs |
| 2024 | "Breaking Out" | Colin Jeffs |

== Awards ==
=== Queensland Music Awards ===
The Queensland Music Awards (previously known as Q Song Awards) are annual awards celebrating Queensland, Australia's brightest emerging artists and established legends. They commenced in 2006.

| Year | Nominee / work | Award | Result (wins only) |
|---|---|---|---|
| 2018 | "Ethereal" | Heavy Song of the Year | Won |
