= Self-care (disambiguation) =

Self-care is the maintenance of one's personal well-being and health.

Self Care may also refer to:

- Self Care (novel), a 2020 American satirical novel
- Self Care (album), a 2020 album by Yours Truly
- "Self Care" (song), a song by Mac Miller from his 2018 album Swimming
- "Self Care", a song by Miiesha from her 2020 album Nyaaringu
