= Primrose Path (Dream State album) =

Studio album by Dream State
- Released: 18 October 2019
- Recorded: 2019
- Studio: Silk Mill (Stoke-on-Trent)
- Genre: Post-hardcore, metalcore
- Length: 41:16
- Label: UNFD
- Producer: Dan Weller

Dream State chronology
Recovery (2018)	Primrose Path (2019)

Singles from Dream State
- 1. "Hand in Hand" Released: 6 March 2019; 2. "Primrose" Released: 10 July 2019; 3. "Open Windows" Released: 20 August 2019; 4. "Twenty Letters" Released: 8 October 2019; 5. "Are You Ready to Live?" Released: 21 June 2020

Professional ratings
Review scores
Source	Rating
Distorted Sound Magazine	9/10
Kerrang!	4/5
New Noise Magazine	4/5 stars
Sputnikmusic	4.2/5

Primrose Path is the debut full-length album by Welsh post-hardcore band Dream State, released on 18 October 2019 through UNFD. It was produced by Dan Weller and opened at number 100 on the UK Albums Chart.

It's also the final record to feature Charlotte-Jayne "CJ" Gilpin, Rhys Wilcox and Jamie Lee who all parted ways with the band following its release.

== Singles ==
On 6 March 2019, the first single from the album "Hand in Hand" was released. The second single, "Primrose", was released on 10 July 2019. This was followed by the third single "Open Windows" and an official announcement of the album on 20 August 2019. On 8 October 2019, just ten days before the release of the album, a fourth single "Twenty Letters" was released on BBC Radio 1.

A fifth and last single and music video from the album was released on 21 June 2020 for the song "Are You Ready to Live?".

== Track listing ==
Primrose Path track listing
No.	Title	Length
1.	"Made Up Smile"	5:34
2.	"Are You Ready to Live?"	4:15
3.	"Hand in Hand"	3:19
4.	"Open Windows"	3:51
5.	"Twenty Letters"	3:48
6.	"Spitting Lies"	3:33
7.	"Out of the Blue"	3:37
8.	"Chapters"	3:54
9.	"Primrose"	4:24
10.	"I Feel It Too"	5:01
Total length:		41:16

== Personnel ==
Dream State

- Charlotte-Jayne "CJ" Gilpin – lead vocals
- Aled Evans – guitar, bass
- Rhys Wilcox – guitar, bass, backing vocals
- Jamie Lee – drums

Production

- Dan Weller – producer

== Charts ==
Chart performance for Primrose Path
Chart (2019)	Peak position
Scottish Albums (OCC)	73
UK Albums (OCC)	100
UK Independent Albums (OCC)	10
UK Rock & Metal Albums (OCC)	3
