= Toxic (Yours Truly album) =

2024 album by Yours Truly

Studio album by Yours Truly
- Released: 16 August 2024
- Genre: Pop-punk
- Length: 28:16
- Label: UNFD
- Producer: Sam Bassal; Daniel Braunstein; Austin Coupe; Hunter Young

Yours Truly chronology
Is This What I Look Like? (2022)	Toxic (2024)

Singles from Toxic
- 1. "Call My Name" Released: 19 January 2024; 2. "Sour" Released: 3 May 2024; 3. "California Sober" Released: 28 June 2024

Toxic is the second studio album by Australian rock band Yours Truly. The album was released on 16 August 2024.

== Track listing ==
All lyrics are written by Mikaila Delgado.

Toxic track listing
No.	Title	Music	Length
1.	"Back 2 U"	Delgado; Austin Coupe; Hunter Young	2:59
2.	"Sour"	Delgado; Samuel Bassal; Steve Knight	2:45
3.	"California Sober"	Delgado; Edward Winder-Haron; Bassal; Knight	2:42
4.	"Let Go"	Delgado; Bassal	2:35
5.	"All That I'm Not"	Delgado; Bassal	3:06
6.	"Love Feels Like"	Delgado; Bassal	1:53
7.	"Bloodshot Eyes"	Delgado; Bassal	2:35
8.	"Sinking" (featuring Bloom)	Delgado; Jonathan Hawkey; Nat Sherwood	3:24
9.	"Desaturated"	Delgado; Bassal; Sam Guiana	2:27
10.	"Call My Name"	Delgado; Winder-Haron; Daniel Braunstein	3:50
Total length:			28:16

== Personnel ==
Yours Truly

- Mikaila Delgado – lead vocals
- Teddie Winder-Haron – guitar
- Henry Beard – drums

Additional contributors

- Austin Coupe – production (track 1)
- Hunter Young – production (track 1)
- Sam Bassal – production (tracks 6–9), engineering (all tracks), guitar (1–9)
- Daniel Braunstein – production (track 10), mixing (all tracks)

== Release history ==
Toxic release details
Region	Date	Formats	Catalogue	Label	Ref.
Australia	16 August 2024	CD; digital download; streaming	UNFD	UNFD178CD	
Australia	16 August 2024	LP	UNFD	UNFD178LP	
