= Murder Void =

Italian metalcore band

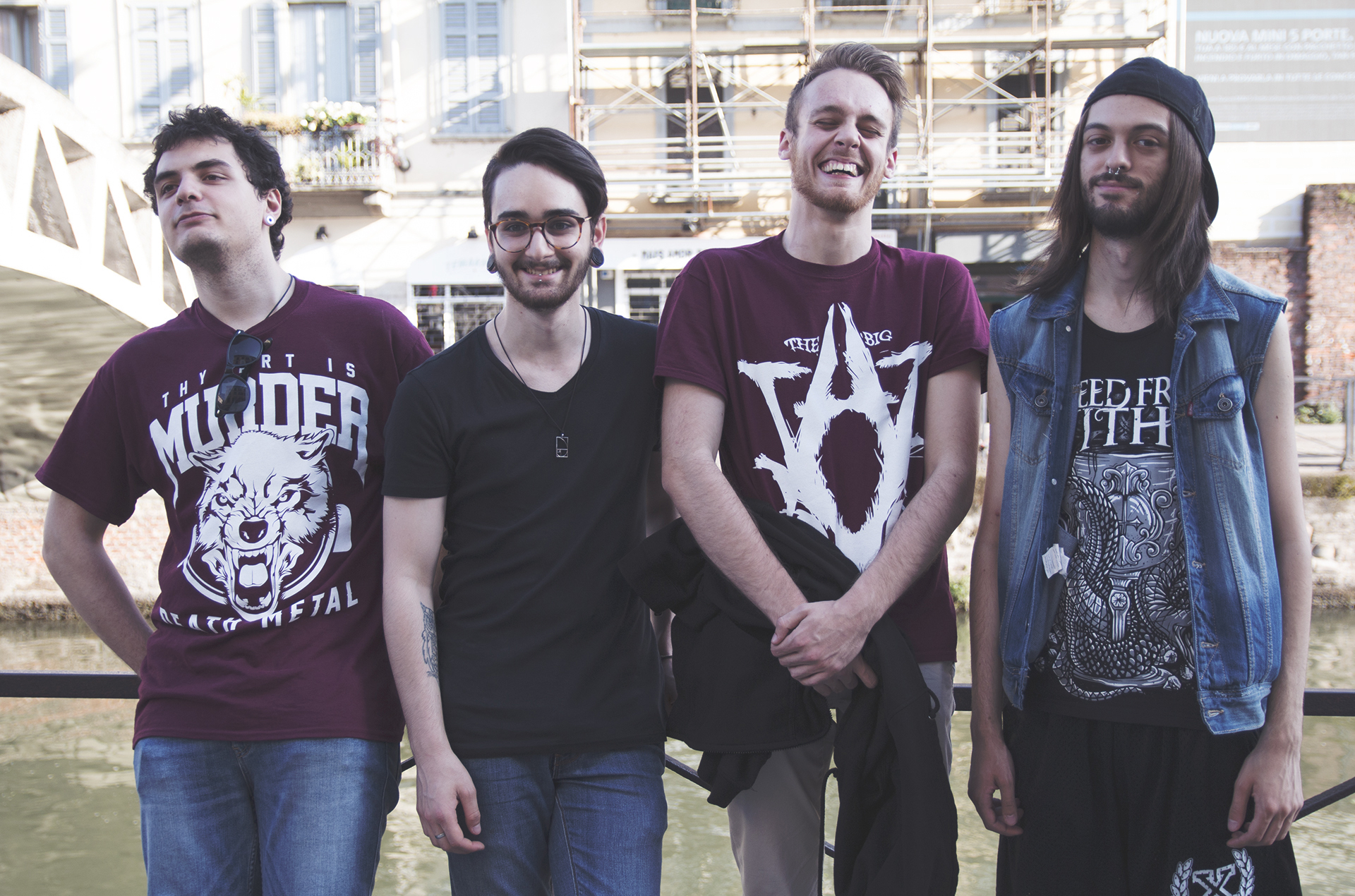

Background information
- Origin: Milan, Italy
- Genres: Metalcore, melodic metalcore
- Years active: 2012–2017
- Labels: Mass Murder, Open Eyes
- Members: Erick Vaghi; Massimiliano Foti; Mirko La Verde; Michele Riva; Giacomo Bonfadini
- Past members: Davide Aroldi; Theo Volpe; Christian Cesare Magli
- Website: http://www.murdervoid.com

Murder Void is an Italian metalcore band from Milan. It was formed in 2012 and has released two studio EPs (Smoke Your Last Breath and Life Is Yours) and four singles, including "Regret Nothing".

As part of the metalcore scene, Murder Void has opened for Kingdom of Giants, Ready, Set Fall!, Imminence, Beyond All Recognition, Burning Down Alaska, Dream on Dreamer and other bands from all over the world.

In 2015, Murder Void released the first song from the EP Life Is Yours, "Hope", which was made in a DIY ethic. Its lyrics talk about a straight edge lifestyle. With the EP Life Is Yours, the band took on an anti-racist position. In April 2016, the lead singer, Davide Aroldi, left the band and was replaced by Erick Vaghi.

== Members ==
Current members

- Erick Vaghi – vocals
- Massimiliano Foti – guitar
- Giacomo Bonfadini – guitar
- Mirko La Verde – bass guitar
- Michele Riva – drums

Past members

- Davide Aroldi – vocals
- Christian Cesare Magli – vocals
- Theo Volpe – guitar and clean vocals

Touring members

- Mattia Frassinetti – guitar

== Discography ==
=== EPs ===
- Smoke Your Last Breath (2012)
- Life Is Yours (2015)

=== Singles ===
- "Regret Nothing" (2013)
- "Hope" (2014)
- "Northstar" (2014)
- "Echoes" (2016)
