= Epoch (The Brave album) =

2016 album by The Brave

Studio album by The Brave
- Released: 5 August 2016
- Recorded: 2016
- Studios: STL Studios, Sydney, NSW
- Genres: Metalcore, hardcore
- Length: 33:39
- Labels: UNFD; Rise
- Producer: Sonny Truelove

The Brave chronology
Epoch (2016)	Aura (2019)

Singles from Epoch
- 1. "Searchlight" Released: 28 March 2016; 2. "Escape" Released: 12 May 2016; 3. "Break Free" Released: 9 June 2016

Epoch is the debut studio album by Australian metalcore band The Brave, released on 5 August 2016 by UNFD. It was produced, engineered, and mixed by Sonny Truelove at his recording studio, STL Studios in Sydney.

== Background and promotion ==
An "epoch" is a notable period in history or in someone's life. Being their debut studio album, The Brave chose that as its title. Frontman Nathan Toussaint explained "...for us that is exactly what this album is. It's a significant thing that has taken us from just being a local band having a bit of fun to a signed band with an album we are truly proud of."

The album artwork was done by Pat Fox, including the album insert booklet art. Additional photography was done by guitarist Kurt Thomson.

Their first single since signing on with UNFD, "Searchlight" was released on 28 March 2016 via a mystery email blast. The band then went on tour to promote the new single on 22, 28, and 30 April. They performed in Brisbane, Melbourne, and Sydney. All shows were restricted for over-18s only. Their second single of the album, "Escape", was released on 12 May. Their third single "Break Free" was released on 9 June. The album was announced by the band on 1 July.

On 7 July, a music video was released for the single "Searchlights". On 22 July, a music video was released for the track "Dreamless" featuring Northlane vocalist Marcus Bridge.

== Writing and composition ==
All songs were co-written by vocalist Nathan Toussaint and producer Sonny Truelove, except "1945" which was written only by Truelove. The track "Ignited Youth" contains themes concerning the human cost of global conflict. The track "Searchlights" was written in tribute to Toussaint's cousin who died in 2007. The track "1945" is about the second World War. The genre of the album has been described as hardcore, and metalcore.

== Critical reception ==
Professional ratings
Review scores
Source	Rating
KillYourStereo	60/100
Louder Sound	4/5 stars
Mosh	5/10 stars
Rock Sound	7/10

The album received mixed to favourable reviews. Mosh, in a mid-rating review, said: "As is typical of any artist’s first release, The Brave’s sound still needs some refining, but the guys have to be applauded for their bravery." Rating the album 7/10, Jennifer Geddes from Rock Sound said: "The Brave’s debut album is a heady cocktail of melodic anthems and full-blooded mosh pit starters." however she noted that "It's a shame that level of intensity isn’t present across the whole album..." Louder Sound rated the album positively, calling it "a surprisingly strong collection, delivered with heart and passion." Chris Giacca of Kill Your Stereo criticised the band for sounding too similar to Bring Me the Horizon and Northlane. He praised Toussaint's vocal screams, however he noted that the vocalist's pushed chest voice was his weak point and should work on improving it.

Tim Lambert from Stack called the album: "A resonating display of power and passion."

== Track listing ==
Track listing adapted from Spotify.

No.	Title	Writer(s)	Length
1.	"Searchlights"	Nathan Toussaint, Sonny Truelove	4:03
2.	"Break Free"	Toussaint, Truelove	3:16
3.	"Eclipse"	Toussaint, Truelove	3:22
4.	"Dreamless" (featuring Marcus Bridge)	Toussaint, Truelove	3:38
5.	"Ignited Youth"	Toussaint, Truelove	2:49
6.	"1945"	Truelove	3:08
7.	"Escape"	Toussaint, Truelove	3:07
8.	"Undone"	Toussaint, Truelove	2:28
9.	"Epoch"	Toussaint, Truelove	1:19
10.	"Legacy"	Toussaint, Truelove	2:59
11.	"Slipping Away"	Toussaint, Truelove	3:30
Total length:			33:39

== Personnel ==
The Brave

- Nathan Toussaint – lead vocals
- Kurt Thomson – lead guitar, additional photography
- Dave Mead – rhythm guitar
- Daniel Neucom – bass
- Brent Thomson – drums

Additional musicians

- Marcus Bridge – guest vocals on track 4

Production

- Sonny Truelove – producer, engineering, mixing
- Pat Fox – album artwork
