= Vultures Above, Lions Below =

Studio album by Buried in Verona
- Released: 7 August 2015
- Recorded: 2015
- Studio: Oxygen Studios, Sydney
- Genre: Metalcore, post-hardcore, alternative rock
- Length: 47:01
- Label: UNFD, Rise
- Producer: Buried in Verona

Buried in Verona chronology
Faceless (2014)	Vultures Above, Lions Below (2015)

Singles from Vultures Above, Lions Below
- 1. "Can't Be Unsaid" Released: 30 June 2015; 2. "Pathways" Released: 14 July 2015; 3. "Hurricane" Released: 23 July 2015

Vultures Above, Lions Below is the fifth and final album by Australian metalcore band Buried in Verona. The album was released on 7 August 2015 through UNFD and Rise Records. This is the first album to feature Mark Harris on lead guitar, Brandon Martel on bass and the last album to feature Conor Ward on drums.

== Track listing ==
No.	Title	Length
1.	"Vultures Above"	5:09
2.	"Extraction"	4:45
3.	"Dig Me Out"	2:58
4.	"Hurricane"	4:11
5.	"Separation"	3:15
6.	"Can't Be Unsaid"	4:37
7.	"Reflection"	3:20
8.	"Done for Good"	4:11
9.	"Pathways"	3:38
10.	"Unbroken"	3:27
11.	"Bring Me Home"	3:53
12.	"Lions Below"	3:30
Total length:		47:01

== Personnel ==
Buried in Verona

- Brett Anderson – lead vocals, lyrics
- Mark Harris – lead guitar
- Richie Newman – rhythm guitar, clean vocals
- Brandon Martel – bass guitar
- James Swanson – drums (credited but does not perform)

Additional personnel

- Conor Ward – drums

Production

- Buried in Verona – production
- Greg Stace – co-producer, engineer
- Mark Harris – engineer
- Fredrik Nordström – mixing, mastering
- Henrik Udd – mixing, mastering

== Charts ==
Chart (2015)	Peak position
Australian Albums (ARIA)	17
