= Notorious (Buried in Verona album) =

Studio album by Buried in Verona
- Released: 16 October 2012
- Genre: Metalcore
- Length: 43:56
- Label: UNFD/Artery
- Producer: Fredrik Nordström

Buried in Verona chronology
Saturday Night Sever (2010)	Notorious (2012)	Faceless (2014)

Notorious: Reloaded

Singles from Notorious
- 1. "Four Years" Released: 4 April 2012; 2. "Forget What You Know" Released: 17 May 2012; 3. "Miles Away" Released: 25 May 2012; 4. "I Am Hate" Released: 14 June 2013

Professional ratings
Review scores
Source	Rating
Under the Gun Review	9/10 stars
Bring the Noise	6/10 stars

Notorious is the third album by Australian metalcore band Buried in Verona. The album was released on 16 October 2012 through UNFD and Artery Recordings. It is the first album to feature the bassist Daniel Gynn and guitarists Nate Martin and Sean Gynn. Notorious debuted at No. 20 on the ARIA Albums Chart. The deluxe edition of the album entitled Notorious: Reloaded was released on 13 June 2013 with 3 new songs.

== Track listing ==
No.	Title	Length
1.	"Maybe Next Time"	3:18
2.	"Four Years"	3:21
3.	"Miles Away"	3:47
4.	"Can't Let It Go" (featuring Ahren Stringer of The Amity Affliction)	3:45
5.	"LionHeart"	4:55
6.	"Couldn't Give 34 Fucks"	2:59
7.	"Perceptions"	3:53
8.	"The Descent"	3:45
9.	"Forget What You Know"	3:33
10.	"Finder Keepers"	3:24
11.	"Last Words"	3:35
12.	"Ivory"	3:47
Total length:		43:56

Notorious: Reloaded
No.	Title	Length
1.	"I Am Hate"	3:55
2.	"Maybe Next Time"	3:18
3.	"Four Years"	3:21
4.	"Miles Away"	3:47
5.	"Can't Let It Go" (featuring Ahren Stringer of The Amity Affliction)	3:45
6.	"LionHeart"	4:55
7.	"Couldn't Give 34 Fucks"	2:59
8.	"Perceptions"	3:53
9.	"The Descent"	3:45
10.	"Forget What You Know"	3:33
11.	"Finders Keepers"	3:24
12.	"Last Words"	3:35
13.	"Ivory"	3:47
14.	"Time Flies"	3:07
15.	"Take Me Away"	2:58
Total length:		53:56

== Personnel ==
Buried in Verona

- Brett Anderson – Lead vocals
- Nate Martin – guitar
- Sean Gynn – guitar, bass guitar on "I Am Hate"
- Richie Newman – guitar, clean vocals, Lead Vocals track 5
- Daniel Gynn – Bass guitar, lead guitar on "I Am Hate"
- Chris Mellross – Drums
- Conor Ward – Drums on "I Am Hate"

Additional personnel

- Ahren Stringer (The Amity Affliction) – vocals on "Can't Let It Go"

Production

- Fredrik Nordström – Producer, engineer

== Charts ==
Chart (2012)	Peak position
Australian Albums (ARIA)	20
