= Saturday Night Sever =

Studio album by Buried in Verona
- Released: 4 June 2010
- Genre: Metalcore
- Length: 40:47
- Label: Riot Entertainment/Warner Music Group
- Producer: Fredrik Nordström

Buried in Verona chronology
Circle the Dead (2008)	Saturday Night Sever (2010)	Notorious (2012)

Professional ratings
Review scores
Source	Rating
Metal Obsession	4/10 stars
Sputnikmusic	3.3/10 stars
themetalforge	3.6/10 stars

Saturday Night Sever is the second album by Australian metalcore band Buried in Verona. The album was released on 8 June 2010 through Riot Entertainment and Warner Music Group.

== Track listing ==
No.	Title	Length
1.	"The End"	4:25
2.	"Temptress"	3:46
3.	"Saturday Night Sever"	4:02
4.	"Professor Plum in the Ballroom with the Candlestick"	3:02
5.	"Hangin’ Hoes by Their Toes"	3:31
6.	"Go Go Gadget Suicide"	3:36
7.	"Rohypnol Sunrise"	4:07
8.	"Bell Ringer"	3:25
9.	"You Left Me with No Goodbye"	3:54
10.	"Cut Wrists and Sinking Ships"	3:35
11.	"The Beginning"	3:24
Total length:		40:47

== Personnel ==
Buried in Verona

- Brett Anderson – Lead vocals
- Mick Taylor – guitar
- Katongo Chituta – guitar
- Richie Newman – guitar
- Scott Richmond – Bass guitar
- Chris Mellross – Drums

Production

- Fredrik Nordström – Producer, engineer
