= Self Care (album) =

Studio album by Yours Truly
- Released: 18 September 2020
- Recorded: 2019–2020
- Studio: Electric Sun
- Genre: Pop punk
- Length: 37:03
- Label: UNFD
- Producer: Yours Truly, Stevie Knight

Yours Truly chronology
Afterglow (2019)	Self Care (2020)	Is This What I Look Like? (2022)

Singles from Self Care
- 1. "Composure" Released: 16 April 2020; 2. "Together" Released: 7 July 2020; 3. "Undersize" Released: 4 August 2020; 4. "Funeral Home" Released: 3 September 2020; 5. "Siamese Souls" Released: 12 May 2021

Self Care is the debut studio album by Australian rock band Yours Truly, released on 18 September 2020 through UNFD.

== Background and recording ==
Yours Truly formed in Sydney, Australia in 2016, with a line-up of Mikaila Delgado on vocals, Teddie Winder-Haron and Lachlan Cronin on guitar and Bradley Cronon on drums. The following year, they released their debut EP, Too Late for Apologies, which they promoted with shows alongside Forever Ends Here and Tonight Alive. "High Hopes" was issued as a single in 2018, garnering radio play across the country and earning the band supporting dates for Say Anything and We the Kings. Yours Truly then released their next EP, Afterglow, in 2019; that same year, they appeared at Riot Fest and supported Senses Fail in the United States, and supported Sum 41 in the United Kingdom.

Recording sessions for the album were held at Electric Sun Studios and took place throughout 2019 and 2020; the band and Stevie Knight produced the album. Knight also acted as engineer and handled recording, with assistance from Craig Wilkinson. James Paul Wisner mixed the recordings at Wisner Productions while Grant Berry mastered the album at Fader Mastering.

== Release and promotion ==
The album was confirmed by the band's publicist on 16 April 2020, alongside the release of the lead single; before later being officially announced on 7 July 2020, alongside the release of the second single. Into the Pit described the album artwork as featuring "an embroided anatomical heart". The cover was designed by Georgia Maloney.

The album was preceded by four singles: lead single "Composure", released on 16 April 2020, "Together", released on 7 July 2020, "Undersize", released on 4 August 2020, "Funeral Home", released on 3 September 2020 and "Siamese Souls", released on 12 May 2021.

On 17 July 2020, Yours Truly performed live on Triple J's Like a Version segment, performing a cover of Oasis's "Don't Look Back in Anger" and their track "Composure". Yours Truly was planned to appear in the US as part of the Sad Summer Fest touring festival in July and August 2020, but this was postponed to July and August 2021 due to the COVID-19 pandemic.

== Reception ==
Professional ratings
Review scores
Source	Rating
Wall of Sound	9/10

Writing for Tone Deaf, journalist Tyler Jenke described the album as "an important release for this exceptional outfit, and one that will resonate for years to come."

Wall of Sound felt that the album represented the band "stepping up onto a comfortable pedestal" and additionally called the album "a breath of fresh air for any music fan."

Depth Mag's Andrew Cauchi called the album "a fearless charge into stardom for one of Australia's most promising talents". Cauchi additionally thought the album "[declared] the band's credentials on the global stage" and likened it to Avril Lavigne and Kelly Clarkson's early 2000s releases.

Noizze's Will Marshall stated: "Listening to Self Care feels like going through life with your best friend by your side, a supportive companion to get you through the toughest times with empathy and levity." Marshall added: "This album... should make Yours Truly the pop-punk superstars they deserve to be."

Into the Pit's Sian Wilkins praised the album, writing: "Yours Truly literally threw this album at the industry as a force to be reckoned with: it adds to their catalogue of flawless material and demonstrates their growth as an outfit."

Self Care debuted and peaked at number 19 on the ARIA Albums Chart for the chart dated 28 September 2020. The following week, the album fell more than thirty-one places into the lower fifty.

=== Accolades ===
Accolades for Self Care
Year	Organisation	Award	Ref.
2020	Triple J	Feature Album	
2020	Tone Deaf	Record of the Week	

== Track listing ==
Adapted from Apple Music. All music written by Yours Truly, all lyrics by Mikaila Delgado.

Self Care track listing
No.	Title	Length
1.	"Siamese Souls"	4:22
2.	"Composure"	3:09
3.	"Together"	3:19
4.	"Vivid Dream"	3:33
5.	"Undersize"	3:47
6.	"Ghost"	3:11
7.	"Funeral Home"	3:19
8.	"Glass Houses"	3:20
9.	"Half of Me"	4:18
10.	"Heartsleeve"	4:45
Total length:		37:03

== Personnel ==
Adapted from the album's liner notes.

Yours Truly

- Mikaila Delgado – lead vocals
- Lachlan Cronin – guitar
- Teddie Winder-Haron – guitar
- Bradley Cronan – drums

Production and design

- Stevie Knight – recording, engineer, producer
- Craig Wilkinson – assistance
- James Paul Wisner – mixing
- Grant Berry – mastering
- Yours Truly – producer
- Georgia Moloney – art, direction

== Charts ==
Chart performance for Self Care
Chart (2020)	Peak position
Australian Albums (ARIA)	19

== Release history ==
Self Care release details
Region	Date	Formats	Label	Ref.
Australia	18 September 2020	CD; digital download; streaming	UNFD	
Australia	2 October 2020	LP	UNFD	
