= Faceless (Buried in Verona album) =

Studio album by Buried in Verona
- Released: 7 March 2014
- Genre: Metalcore, post-hardcore
- Length: 41:45
- Label: UNFD, Artery
- Producer: Joey Sturgis

Buried in Verona chronology
Notorious (2012)	Faceless (2014)	Vultures Above, Lions Below (2015)

Singles from Faceless
- 1. "Splintered" Released: 29 November 2013; 2. "Illuminate" Released: 22 January 2014; 3. "Set Me on Fire" Released: 25 February 2014; 4. "The Faceless" Released: 5 March 2014

Faceless is the fourth album by Australian metalcore band, Buried in Verona. It was released on 7 March 2014 through UNFD and Artery Recordings. Faceless was produced by Joey Sturgis and debuted at No. 15 on the ARIA Albums Chart. This is the first album to feature Conor Ward on drums and the last album to feature Sean Gynn on bass and Daniel Gynn on guitar.

== Track listing ==
No.	Title	Length
1.	"The Breach"	0:38
2.	"Eclipse"	4:01
3.	"Splintered"	2:39
4.	"Illuminate"	3:31
5.	"Graves"	3:17
6.	"Set Me on Fire"	3:54
7.	"The Damned"	3:53
8.	"Catatonic"	4:03
9.	"Antidote"	3:00
10.	"Revival"	2:59
11.	"Deception"	3:46
12.	"Blind Eyes"	2:34
13.	"The Faceless"	3:30
Total length:		41:45

== Personnel ==
Credits from AllMusic

Buried in Verona

- Brett Anderson – lead vocals
- Daniel Gynn – lead guitar
- Richie Newman – rhythm guitar, clean vocals, lead vocals track 6
- Sean Gynn – bass guitar
- Conor Ward – drums

Additional personnel

- Joey Sturgis – producer, engineer, mixing, mastering, guest vocals on track 13
- Nick Scott – engineer, vocal editing
- Tyler Acord – scratching
- Jeff Dunne – drum editing
- Trevor Fedele – string editing
- Elise Linder – cello
- Kenneth Trotter – violin
- Luke Logemann – A&R
- Kane Hibberd – photography
- Pat Fox – art direction, design

== Charts ==
Chart (2014)	Peak position
Australian Albums (ARIA)	15
