= Circle the Dead =

Studio album by Buried in Verona
- Released: 5 November 2008
- Recorded: January – March 2008
- Genre: Metalcore
- Length: 39:09
- Label: Riot Entertainment
- Producer: Greg Stace

Buried in Verona chronology
Circle the Dead (2008)	Saturday Night Sever (2010)

Professional ratings
Review scores
Source	Rating
Metal Obsession	4/10 stars

Circle the Dead is the debut full-length studio album by Australian metalcore band Buried in Verona. The album was released on 5 November 2008 through Riot Entertainment.

== Track listing ==
No.	Title	Length
1.	"Five Bullet Russian Roulette"	4:47
2.	"All for Nothing"	4:07
3.	"Colonel Mustard in the Conservatory with the Lead Pipe"	3:39
4.	"Can I Borrow a Feeling?"	3:24
5.	"Taken to the Light"	4:45
6.	"Dirt Nap"	3:26
7.	"Face of Tragedy"	3:08
8.	"Circle the Dead"	0:51
9.	"Don't Call Me Baby"	3:31
10.	"For Darker Days"	3:08
11.	"No Time to Die"	4:23
Total length:		39:09

== Personnel ==
Buried in Verona

- Brett Anderson – Lead vocals
- Mick Taylor – guitar
- Katongo Chituta – guitar
- Scott Richmond – Bass guitar
- Steve Rogers – Drums

Production

- Greg Stace - Producer, engineer
- Steve Smart - Mastering
- DW Norton - Mixing
- Gareth Leach - Mixing Assistant
