= Aura (The Brave album) =

2019 album by The Brave

Studio album by The Brave
- Released: 5 April 2019
- Studio: Heliport Studios, Buderim, QLD
- Genre: Post-hardcore, metalcore
- Length: 37:58
- Label: UNFD
- Producer: Troy Brady

The Brave chronology
Epoch (2016)	Aura (2019)

Singles from Aura
- 1. "Ethereal" Released: 3 August 2017; 2. "Technicolor" Released: 6 February 2019; 3. "Desolation" Released: 6 March 2019; 4. "Burn" Released: 4 April 2019

Aura is the second studio album by Australian metalcore band The Brave, released on 5 April 2019 by UNFD. It was produced by Troy Brady and recorded at Heliport Studios in Buderim.

== Promotion and singles ==
On 2 August 2017, The Brave released their single "Ethereal" and its accompanying music video. On 6 February 2019, the single "Technicolor" was released, alongside its accompanying music video. A tour to promote "Technicolor" was announced shortly after its release, Melbourne rock band Windwaker joined them. They also announced Aura and its expected release date. On 6 March, the band released their newest single, "Desolation", which was premiered on Triple J's Short.Fast.Loud segment. On 4 April, a day before the album's release, the band released the single "Burn" alongside an accompanying music video. On 15 May, the band announced an 'Aura Tour' with special guests Pridelands appearing at all but two performances.

== Writing and composition ==
Explaining the album's title, vocalist Nathan Toussaint said: "We all believe in auras, whether it be the auras that surround the people we meet during our travels, or the ones surrounding the places we visit either on tour or in our personal lives. It’s these same auras that draw us back to these places we visit or allow us to develop relationships with new people we meet and connect with along the way. The same applies to the music we write and the aura that it carries with it."

The track "Ethereal" addresses the band's view on a world set on destroying itself. Toussaint describes "Technicolor" as "...about one of [his] first experiences of getting a little too loose when [he] was young." Many of the album's songs contains themes of love, loss, and change.

== Critical reception ==
Professional ratings
Review scores
Source	Rating
Alt Dialogue	4/10
Games, Brrraaains & A Head-Banging Life	7.5/10
Hysteria	7/10
The Soundboard	5/10
Wall of Sound	3.5/5 stars

The album received mixed to positive reviews. Chanel Issa from Hysteria gave the album a 7/10 and said: "Aura is not the album that will see The Brave reinvent the wheel, but it is the album that will see them drop a set of some incredibly catchy metalcore tunes." Wall of Sound, in a positive review said: "The Brave have exploded back into the music scene with this one. After watching them perform recently on the Technicolor Tour, it's exciting[sic] to be able to see how far this band can go." Carl Fisher of Games, Brrraaains & A Head-Banging Life rated the album positively, however criticised the title track as being "a slow RnB style song that is just so bland and so out of place when sandwiched in between the former and the latter, Desolation. It’s not about the effects in particular as they’re layered throughout but rather how poorly used they are there. It’s just too out of left field." Alt Dialogue gave it a negative review, calling it "nothing more than generic metalcore, even that is giving it more credit than its worth." Luke Nuttall of The Soundboard gave it a mixed 5/10 saying: "It might be worth a try for the most ardent of completionists, but if this album didn’t exist at all, things would be no better or worse off."

== Track listing ==
Track listing adapted from iTunes.

No.	Title	Length
1.	"Through the Dark"	4:31
2.	"Technicolor"	3:15
3.	"Out of Reach"	3:14
4.	"Ethereal"	3:02
5.	"Lost to the Night"	3:28
6.	"Burn"	3:41
7.	"Above the Clouds"	3:56
8.	"Aura"	2:51
9.	"Desolation"	3:17
10.	"Dragged Down"	3:35
11.	"Goodbye"	3:01
Total length:		37:58

== Personnel ==
The Brave

- Nathan Toussaint – lead vocals
- Kurt Thomson – lead guitar
- Denham Lee – rhythm guitar
- Daniel Neucom – bass
- Brent Thomson – drums

Production

- Troy Brady – producer, engineering
- WZRD BLD – mixing, mastering
- Darren Oorloff – album artwork

== Charts ==
Chart (2019)	Peak position
Australian Digital Albums (ARIA)	42
