= After Touch =

Australia punk band

- Also known as: Easy Life (2014–2018)
- Origin: Shellharbour, New South Wales, Australia
- Genres: Alternative rock; melodic hardcore; post-hardcore
- Years active: 2014–present
- Label: UNFD
- Members: Max Pasalic; Jack Rankin; Jordan Pranic; Jesse Mate-Gallo; Marcus Conti
- Past members: Chris Bevern; Kurt Haywood

After Touch are an Australian punk band from Shellharbour, formed in 2014. Originally formed under the name Easy Life, the band comprises guitarists Jack Rankin and Jesse Mate-Gallo, bassist Marcus Conti, drummer Jordan Pranic, and vocalist Max Pasalic. They have released two EPs: There Can't Be This Much Water in the Sky (2017) and You Wish This Was About You (2018).

== History ==
=== Early years and There Can't Be This Much Water in the Sky (2014–2017) ===
Easy Life was formed in 2014, with Jack Rankin on lead guitar, Chris Bevern on rhythm guitar, Kurt Haywood on bass guitar, Jordan Pranic on drums, and Max Pasalic on vocals. The five met through the same high school, while Bevern was recruited later. On 14 March 2014, Easy Life released Demo 2014, containing three tracks. On 28 June, they released a B-Side to their demo "Purple". The band then released an EP entitled Ambient Activity on 15 February 2015. The single "Close to Burning" featured guest vocals from Jack R Reilly. Sometime in late-2016, guitarist Chris Bevern left the band for unknown reasons.

After finding a new guitarist, Jesse Mate-Gallo, their debut single "I'm Fading Away" was released and uploaded to Triple J Unearthed on 14 June 2017, alongside an accompanying music video. After signing onto UNFD, the single was re-released on 30 August under the label. Easy Life won the opportunity to play at Yours and Owls by winning Triple J's Unearthed competition. Easy Life's debut UNFD EP, There Can't Be This Much Water in the Sky soon followed on 27 September.

=== Renaming and You Wish This Was About You (2018–present) ===
In July 2018, Easy Life officially announced they would change their name to 'After Touch', due to their evolving sound. Their first single under their new name, "Use Me", was released on 25 July, it premiered on Triple J's 'Good Nights' segment. An accompanying music video was also released. Easy Life played one more show under their old name on 26 July at the Rad Bar. On 27 August, they released the single "Six Feet Closer". Their sophomore EP, You Wish This Was About You, was released on 7 September.

After Touch went on a nine-show tour of Australia for their You Wish This Was About You Release Tour, alongside Vacant Home. The band later performed at the first Halloween Hysteria Festival in Brisbane on 27 October. Later that year, founding bassist Kurt Haywood silently left the band for unknown reasons, he was later replaced with Marcus Conti.

== Musical style ==
After Touch's sound has been described as melodic hardcore, electro alt-rock, and post-hardcore. Guitarist Jack Rankin notes Taking Back Sunday as a major influence in their creative process.

== Members ==
Current

- Max Pasalic – lead vocals (2014–present)
- Jack Rankin – lead guitar (2014–present)
- Jesse Mate-Gallo – rhythm guitar (2017–present)
- Marcus Conti – bass (2019–present)
- Jordan Pranic – drums (2014–present)

Former

- Kurt Haywood – bass (2014–2018)
- Chris Bevern – rhythm guitar (2014–2016)

== Discography ==
=== Extended plays ===
List of extended plays and demos
Title	Details
as Easy Life
Demo 2014	Released: 14 March 2014; Label: Self-released; Format: Digital download
Ambient Activity	Released: 15 February 2015; Label: Self-released; Format: Digital download
There Can't Be This Much Water in the Sky	Released: 29 September 2017; Label: UNFD; Format: Cassette, digital download
as After Touch
You Wish This Was About You	Released: 7 September 2018; Label: UNFD; Format: Digital download

=== Singles ===
Title	Year	Album
as Easy Life
"Purple"	2014	non-album single
"Close to Burning" (featuring Jack R Reilly)	2015	Ambient Activity
"I'm Fading Away"	2017	There Can't Be This Much Water in the Sky
as After Touch
"Use Me"	2018	You Wish This Was About You
"Six Feet Closer"	2018	You Wish This Was About You

=== Music videos ===
Year	Song	Director
2017	"I'm Fading Away"	Unknown
2018	"Use Me"	Glenn Hanns
