= Dream State =

Welsh rock band

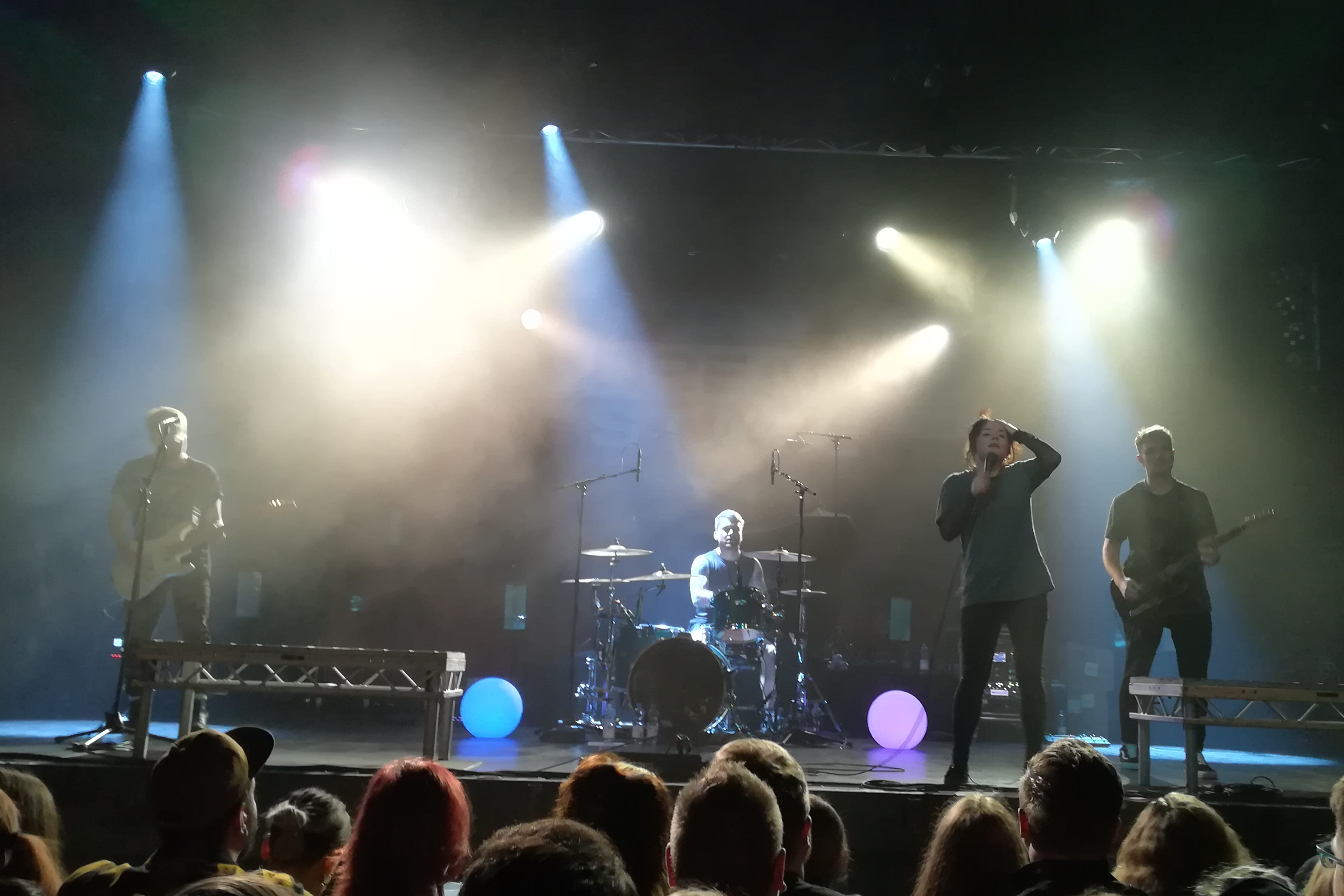
- Dream State performing in Hamburg in 2020. From left to right: Rhys Wilcox, Jamie Lee, CJ Gilpin, Aled Evans

Background information
- Origin: Carmarthen, Wales
- Genres: Post-hardcore; alternative rock; metalcore
- Years active: 2014–present
- Label: UNFD
- Members: Aled Evans; Jake Bowen; Tom Connolly; Jessie Powell
- Past members: Jamie Lee; Danny Rayer; Sam Harrison-Little; CJ Gilpin; Rhys Wilcox
- Website: dreamstateofficial.com

Dream State are a Welsh rock band, formed in 2014 in Carmarthen. They signed to Australian record label UNFD in 2017 and have released two EPs (their debut Consequences in 2015 and Recovery in 2018) as well as a studio album Primrose Path.

The band currently consists of guitarist Aled Evans, along with bassist Jake Bowen, drummer Tom Connolly and vocalist Jessie Powell.

== History ==
=== Formation and Consequences ===
Dream State was formed in Carmarthen in South Wales, UK, in 2014 practising in the Golden Lion pub by vocalist CJ Gilpin, guitarists Aled Evans and Sam Harrison-Little, bassist Danny Rayer and drummer Jamie Lee.

They released their first single, "Burn Them Down", on 8 January 2015. Later that year, on 20 November, they released their first EP Consequences, which was recorded at The Boneyard Studio in South Wales.

=== Line-up change, UNFD and Recovery ===
In March 2017 the band released their single "White Lies". That summer they had their first festival appearance at Reading and Leeds Festivals. It was later announced, that Dream State had signed to independent record label UNFD at the festival.

2017 also saw a change in line-up. Founding member Sam Harrison-Little was replaced by Rhys Wilcox.

On 18 May 2018, the band's second EP Recovery was released through UNFD.

Dream State is featured on the 2018 compilation album Songs That Saved My Life in aid of mental health and suicide prevention charities. For the compilation, the band recorded a cover of Linkin Park's "Crawling".

=== Primrose Path and departure of Danny Rayer ===
On 6 March 2019, Dream State released the single "Hand in Hand".

The band released their single "Primrose" on 10 July 2019. It is their first release after the departure of bassist Danny Rayer, who "has decided to focus his time on his wonderful family."

On 20 August 2019, the band released their single "Open Windows" and also announced that their debut album Primrose Path, produced by Dan Weller, would be released on 18 October 2019.

Dream State released their single "Twenty Letters" on 8 October 2019, a day after its premiere on Annie Mac's Radio 1's Future Sounds on BBC Radio 1.

On 18 October 2019 their debut album Primrose Path was released and opened on position 100 in the official UK Albums Chart. Loudwire named it one of the 50 best rock albums of 2019. Following the release, the band went on a UK headliner tour beginning on 27 October 2019 in Glasgow and went on to support Being as an Ocean on their tour through Europe afterwards. In the beginning of 2020, Dream State supported I Prevail on their Europe tour. The final leg of the tour had to be postponed due to the COVID-19 pandemic.

Dream State released their music video for "Are You Ready To Live?" on 24 June 2020. The video features clips sent in by fans as well as live footage of the band.

On 28 October 2020 the band released their single "Monsters". Two days later, Dream State announced the amicable departure of drummer Jamie Lee.

=== Departure of CJ and Rhys, new lineup ===
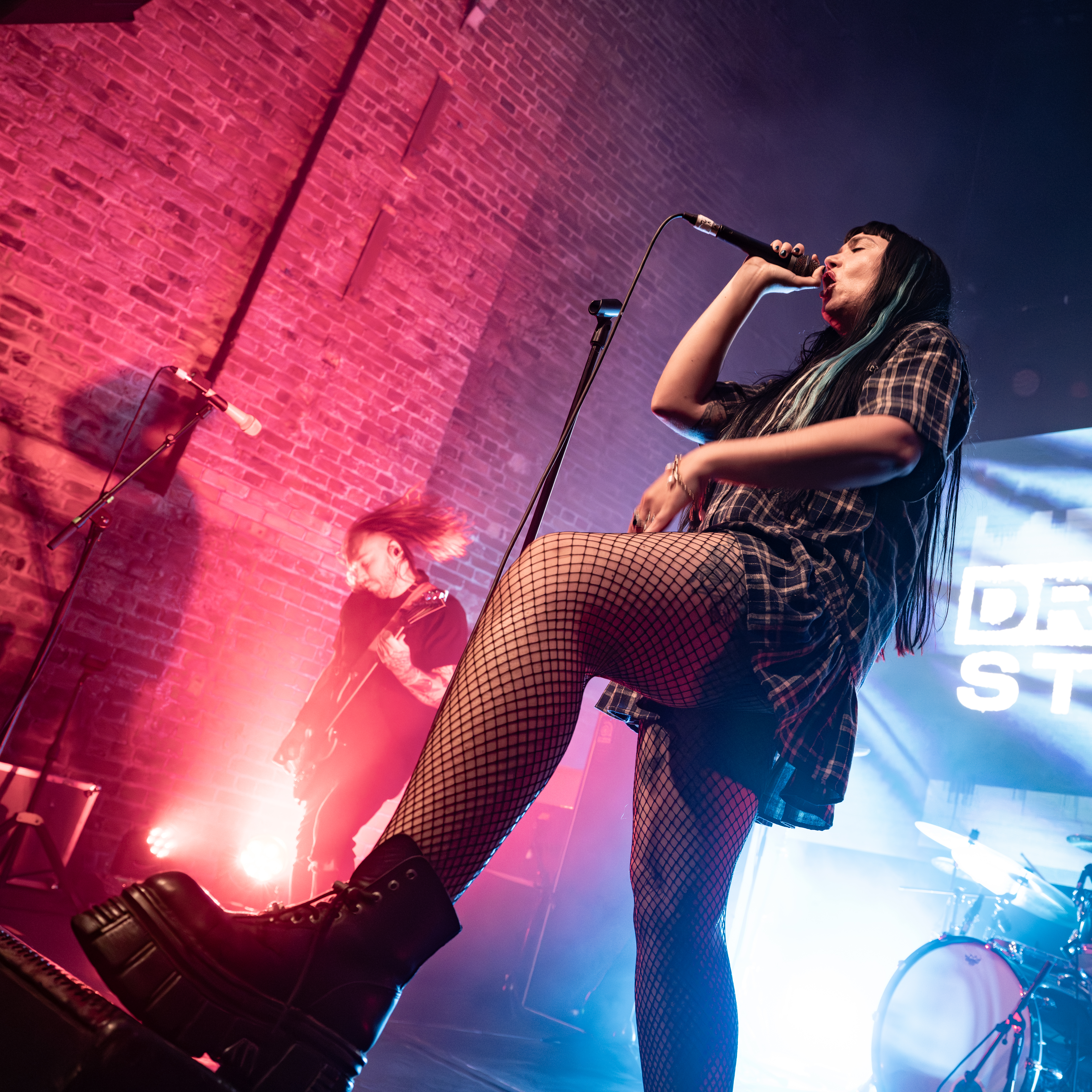
At Village Underground, SXSW London, June 2026

On 24 February 2022 a statement from guitarist Aled Evans was posted on the bands social media, announcing that CJ Gilpin and Rhys Wilcox have left the band. It was also revealed that the band had brought in a new drummer and a new bassist, who were unnamed at that time. The new lineup has been unveiled on 14 October 2022 through their social media accounts, bassist Jake Bowen, drummer Tom Connolly and vocalist Jessie Powell were introduced as the new members. Along with the new lineup, the band released a new song and music video for "Taunt Me". In December 2022, they announced their EP "Untethered" with a release date of 3rd of February 2023 and released the single "Comfort in Chaos". In February 2023, they released "Chain Reactions", the 3rd and final single from their "Untethered EP" and embarked on a UK tour. In June, it was announced Dream State would tour the UK and Europe alongside As December Falls in late 2023. In October, they supported Funeral For a Friend at Cardiff Utilita Arena. On the 18th of October, they announced their upcoming mini album "Still Dreaming" for a release date of 26th of January 2024.

== Musical style and influences ==
Dream State's musical style has mostly been described as post-hardcore, alternative rock, and metalcore. Jake Richardson of Kerrang! wrote about the band's sound: "It can loosely be described as post-hardcore, but the quintet throw in elements of math-rock, metal and punk and impress at every point."

They have cited influences including Bring Me the Horizon, the Plot In You, Alexisonfire, Thrice, the Used, the Fall Of Troy, Deftones, the 1975, Nirvana, FKA Twigs, Idles, Beartooth, While She Sleeps, A Day to Remember, Slipknot, Tool, Linkin Park, Modern Error, Holding Absence, Caskets, Dayseeker, Windwaker, Spiritbox, Architects, Polaris, Animals as Leaders, the Mars Volta, Jinjer, the Home Team, Vukovi, Smash Mouth, Funeral for a Friend and Motionless in White.

== Members ==
Current

- Aled Evans – lead guitar (2014–present), rhythm guitar, backing vocals (2022–present), bass (2019–2021)
- Jake Bowen – bass, backing vocals (2021–present)
- Tom Connolly – drums (2021–present)
- Jessie Powell – lead vocals (2022–present)

Former

- Sam Harrison-Little – rhythm guitar, backing vocals (2014–2017), bass (2019–2021)
- Danny Rayer – bass (2014–2019)
- Jamie Lee – drums (2014–2020)
- Charlotte-Jayne "CJ" Gilpin – lead vocals (2014–2021)
- Rhys Wilcox – rhythm guitar, backing vocals (2017–2021)

== Discography ==
=== Studio albums ===
Title	Album details	Peak chart positions
Title	Album details	UK
Primrose Path	Released: 18 October 2019; Label: UNFD; Format: LP; CD; DL	100

=== Extended plays ===
Title	EP details
Consequences	Released: 20 November 2015; Label: Self-released; Format: CD; DL
Recovery	Released: 18 May 2018; Label: UNFD; Format: CD; DL
Untethered	Released: 3 February 2023; Label: Independent; Format: DL
Still Dreaming	Released: 26 January 2024; Label: Independent; Format: LP; CD; DL

=== Compilation appearances ===
- Songs That Saved My Life (2018) – "Crawling" (originally performed by Linkin Park)

=== Music videos ===
Year	Title	Album	Director
2015	"Burn Them Down"	Consequences	Scott Samuel
2015	"Rebuild, Recreate"	Consequences	weCREATE
2017	"White Lies"	Recovery	Zak Pinchin
2018	"In This Hell"	Recovery	Zak Pinchin
2018	"New Waves"	Recovery	Clearway Media
2019	"Primrose"	Primrose Path	Zak Pinchin
2019	"Open Windows"	Primrose Path	Zak Pinchin
2019	"Twenty Letters"	Primrose Path	Zak Pinchin
2020	"Are You Ready To Live?"	Primrose Path	Zak Pinchin
2020	"Monsters"	Non-album single	Zak Pinchin
2022	"Taunt Me"	Untethered	Zak Pinchin
2023	"Comfort In Chaos"	Untethered	Zak Pinchin
2023	"Chain Reactions"	Untethered	Theodore Swaddling
2023	"Chin Up Princess"	Still Dreaming	GLK Media
2023	"Still Dreaming"	Still Dreaming	GLK Media
2023	"Anxious State Of Mind"	Still Dreaming	GLK Media
2024	"Day Seeker"	Still Dreaming	GLK Media
2024	"Bloom"	TBA	GLK Media

== Awards ==
Kerrang! Awards

Year	Nominee / work	Award	Result
2018	Dream State	Best British Breakthrough	Won

Heavy Music Awards

Year	Nominee / work	Award	Result
2019	Dream State	Best UK Breakthrough Band	Won
