= Yours Truly (band) =

Australian pop-punk band

- Origin: Sydney, New South Wales, Australia
- Genre: Pop punk
- Years active: 2016–present
- Label: UNFD
- Members: Mikaila Delgado; Teddie Winder-Haron; Henry Beard
- Past members: Lachlan Cronin; Bradley Cronan
- Website: www.yourstruly.band

Yours Truly are an Australian pop-punk band formed in 2016 in Sydney, New South Wales. Their debut studio album, Self Care (2020), peaked at number 19 on the ARIA Albums Chart.

Louder Sound credited Yours Truly as one of several bands "reinventing pop-punk for 2021".

== History ==
Yours Truly were formed in 2016 and self-released their debut EP Too Late for Apologies in March 2017. The group's debut singles "Winter" and "Strangers" received airplay on Triple J.

"High Hopes" was released in January 2018. The group released their debut studio album Self Care on 18 September 2020, which debuted at number 19 on the ARIA Albums Chart.

On 9 July 2021, the band released the single "Walk Over My Grave", followed by the single "Lights On" and their EP Is This What I Look Like? was released on the 15 July 2022.

Following the release of Is This What I Look Like?, guitarist Lachlan Cronin and drummer Bradley Cronan left the band to pursue other interests in 2023.

In 2024, drummer Henry Beard joined the band and they released the single, "Call My Name". In May 2024, the band released "Sour" and announced their second studio album Toxic, which was released on 16 August 2024.

== Musical style ==
Yours Truly are a pop-punk band.

== Band members ==
Current

- Mikaila Delgado – lead vocals (2016–present)
- Teddie Winder-Haron – lead guitar (2016–present)
- Henry Beard – drums (2024–present)

Former

- Lachlan Cronin – guitar (2016–2023)
- Bradley Cronan – drums (2016–2023)

== Discography ==
=== Studio albums ===
List of studio albums, with release date, label, and selected chart positions shown
Title	Details	Peak chart positions
Title	Details	AUS
Self Care	Released: 18 September 2020; Label: UNFD (UNFD138); Formats: CD, LP, digital, streaming	19
Toxic	Released: 16 August 2024; Label: UNFD (UNFD178); Formats: CD, LP, digital, streaming	—

=== Extended plays ===
List of EPs, with release date and label shown
Title	EP details
Too Late for Apologies	Released: 31 March 2017; Label: Yours Truly; Formats: Digital download, streaming
Afterglow	Released: 12 April 2019; Label: UNFD (UNFD124CD); Formats: CD, digital download, streaming
Yours Truly on Audiotree Live	Released: 12 April 2019; Label: Audiotree Music; Formats: Digital download, streaming
Is This What I Look Like?	Released: 15 July 2022; Label: UNFD; Formats: streaming

== Awards and nominations ==
=== AIR Awards ===
The Australian Independent Record Awards (commonly known informally as AIR Awards) is an annual awards night to recognise, promote and celebrate the success of Australia's Independent Music sector.

Year	Nominee / work	Award	Result	Ref.
2023	Is This What I Look Like?	Best Independent Heavy Album or EP	Nominated	

=== ARIA Music Awards ===
The ARIA Music Awards is an annual ceremony presented by Australian Recording Industry Association (ARIA), which recognise excellence, innovation, and achievement across all genres of the music of Australia. They commenced in 1987.

Year	Nominee / work	Award	Result	Ref.
2021	Self Care	Best Hard Rock or Heavy Metal Album	Nominated	

=== Heavy Music Awards ===
Launched in 2017, the Heavy Music Awards are annual awards for artists and professionals in heavy music. Several hundred invited members of the music industry nominate candidates in each category with the most nominated candidates forming the shortlists. Following this the winners are then determined by a public vote.

Year	Nominee / work	Award	Result	Ref.
2021	Yours Truly	Best International Breakthrough Artist	Nominated	

=== J Awards ===
The J Awards are an annual series of Australian music awards that were established by the Australian Broadcasting Corporation's youth-focused radio station Triple J. They commenced in 2005.

Year	Nominee / work	Award	Result	Ref.
2020	Yours Truly	Unearthed Artist of the Year	Nominated	
