= Self Care (novel) =

2020 book by Leigh Stein

First edition (publ. Penguin Books)

Self Care is a 2020 American satire by author Leigh Stein. Set in the wake of the 2016 United States presidential election, the novel follows Maren and Devin, co-founders of the fictional social media platform Richual, as they try to balance their personal politics and dedication to well-being against their need to succeed on a platform that depends on advertiser content.

== Summary ==
Maren Gelb, originally from Wisconsin, is the overworked co-founder of the lifestyle platform Richual which aggressively caters to women's wellness goals. While Maren struggles to enact the self-care she espouses on the website, her co-founder Devin Avery, who struggles with an eating disorder and is already well-off thanks to a large inheritance from her deceased father, is the face of the site.

In 2017 Maren releases an angry tweet criticizing Ivanka Trump. The tweet goes viral, much to the distress of Devin who thinks that Maren's behaviour goes against the Richual credo to believe and support women. She suggests that Maren take some time off and asks board member Evan Wiley, a former Bachelorette contestant and minor feminist celebrity, to loan his family's country estate to Maren. While Maren is there she accidentally stumbles across Evan's personal sex room which contains sexualized photos of women who appear to be sleeping.

Later on a story drops in which several women accuse Evan of sexual misconduct and reveal his personal fetish for having sex with women who either appear to be or are asleep. Devin, who is in a consensual relationship with Evan and knows of his fetish, passionately defends him and wants to attack the women as liars while Maren wants to publicly support them. Instead the Richual team decides on a statement in which they celebrate Women's History Month while barely mentioning Evan at all.

At a conference for female entrepreneurs Devin is attacked for her support of Evan. After she flees Maren comes to believe that Devin is another one of Evan's victims, which Devin denies. Maren later steals Devin's phone and posts to Richual telling the world Devin was a victim. The post garners widespread support for both Devin and Richual.

Maren tries to use the next board meeting to oust Evan but is surprised to be ousted herself by Devin who buys her out by undervaluing her shares knowing Maren does not have the ability to fight her.

== Reception ==
The L.A. Times called the novel "a frightfully true portrayal of days gone by". The A.V. Club called it "a timely beach read". Kirkus Reviews described the book as "compulsively readable, occasionally brilliant...and studded with genuine insight into the relationship between modern wellness and dormant rage."
