= Stepson (band) =

Australian rock band

- Origin: Brisbane, Australia
- Genres: Melodic hardcore; post-hardcore
- Years active: 2014–present
- Label: SharpTone
- Website: www.stepsonpunk.com

Stepson are a five-piece Australian melodic hardcore band formed in 2014 in Brisbane. They released their debut studio album Help Me, Help You in March 2021.

== History ==
The band released their debut six-track EP Broken Bottles / Drunken Hearts in 2014. This was followed with a second six-track Echoes in an Empty Room in 2015 and with the three-track EP The Beautiful Lie in 2016.

They have cited influences including Hellions, Counterparts, Balance & Composure, Refused, Foals, Youth, The xx, Parkway Drive, Killswitch Engage, Blessthefall, Stray From the Path, Sum 41, Billy Talent, Megadeth, Deftones and Karnivool.

The band released their debut studio album Help Me, Help You in March 2021 on American label, SharpTone Records, becoming the label's first album released globally by an Australian artist.

== Band members ==
- Brock Alan Conry – vocals
- Jayden Ridley – bass, vocals
- Nick Bennett – guitars
- Nickolas Sean Farr – guitars
- Jordan McDonald – drums

== Discography ==
=== Studio albums ===
List of studio albums, with selected details and chart positions
Title	Details	Peak chart positions
Title	Details	AUS
Help Me, Help You	Released: 26 March 2021; Label: SharpTone (ST5494-1, ST5494-2); Formats: CD, LP, digital download, streaming	67

=== Extended plays ===
List of EPs, with selected details
Title	Details
Broken Bottles / Drunken Hearts	Released: November 2014; Label: Stepson; Formats: digital download, streaming
Echoes in an Empty Room	Released: June 2015; Label: Stepson; Formats: digital download, streaming
The Beautiful Lie	Released: December 2016; Label: Stepson; Formats: digital download, streaming
