= Justice for the Damned =

Australian deathcore band

- Origin: Sydney, Australia
- Genres: Deathcore, metalcore
- Years active: 2011–present
- Labels: Greyscale Records
- Members: Bobak Raffiee; Nick Adams; Kieran Molloy; Ben Mirfin; Chas Levi
- Website: www.greyscalerecords.com/artists/justice-for-the-damned/

Justice for the Damned are an Australian deathcore band formed in 2011. They release their debut album Dragged Through the Dirt in August 2017, followed by Pain Is Power in June 2020 and Stay Relentless in August 2025.

== History ==
In July 2012, the band released the single "Copthrone King's".

In late 2016 the band stepped into the studio with Sam Basal to record their debut album, which was released in August 2017 under the title Dragged Through the Dirt. The album explored feelings of hopelessness and despair.

In 2019 the band relocated to New Jersey to record their second studio album with Will Putney. Pain Is Power was released on 12 June 2020.

== Members ==
- Bobak Rafiee (vocals)
- Nick Adams (guitar, vocals)
- Kieran Molloy (guitar)
- Ben Mirfin (bass)
- Chas Levi (Drums)

== Discography ==
=== Studio albums ===
List of albums and Australian chart positions
Title	Album details	Peak chart positions
Title	Album details	AUS
Dragged Through the Dirt	Release date: 11 August 2017; Label: Greyscale (GSRCD006); Formats: CD, DD, streaming, LP	37
Pain is Power	Release date: 12 June 2020; Label: Greyscale (GSRCD034); Formats: CD, DD, streaming, LP	18
Stay Relentless	Release date: 15 August 2025; Label: Greyscale; Formats: CD, DD, streaming, LP	13

=== Extended plays ===
List of extended plays
Title	EP details
Copthrone King's	Released: 18 August 2012; Label: Justice for the Damned; Formats: CD, DD
Black Vol 1: Slave	Released: June 2014; Label: Justice for the Damned; Formats: DD
Ruin - Repair (co-credited EP with Countdown to Armageddon)	Released: 27 April 2015; Label: Justice for the Damned; Formats: DD

=== Singles ===
Year	Title	Album
2012	"Copthrone King's"	Copthrone King's
2013	"Paramount"	non-album single
2014	"Tyrant"	Black Vol 1: Slave
2014	"Blacklisted"	Black Vol 1: Slave
2015	"Deep Rotting Fear"	non-album single
2016	"Please Don't Leave Me"	Dragged Through the Dirt
2017	"It Will Always Be My Fault "	Dragged Through the Dirt
2017	"Dragged Through the Dirt"	Dragged Through the Dirt
2018	"No Brother, No Friend"	non-album single
2020	"The House You Built Is Burning"	Pain is Power
2020	"Guidance from the Pain" (featuring Matt Honeycutt)	Pain is Power
