= Storm the Sky =

Australian rock band

- Origin: Melbourne, Victoria, Australia
- Genres: Post-hardcore; alternative rock; shoegaze; metalcore (early)
- Years active: 2010–2019
- Labels: UNFD; Rise
- Past members: William Jarratt; Andy Szetho; Lachlan Avis; Benny Craib; Daniel Breen; Alex Trail; Billy Green; Kristian Evagelistis
- Website: www.stormthesky.com

Storm the Sky were an Australian rock band formed in Melbourne.

== History ==
The band was formed in Melbourne in 2011 and consisted of vocalists Daniel Breen and William Jarratt, the guitarists Andy Szetho and Billy Green, as well as bassist Kristian Evangelistis and drummer Alex Trail.

The band released a self-titled MCD in 2012. A year later the release of the EP Vigilance followed. Between 11 and 22 September Storm the Sky toured Australia as supporting act for Fit for a King. Storm the Sky got signed to UNFD in November 2014 announced the release of their debut album in early 2015. The band acquired Matty Mullins of Memphis May Fire as guest musician for the song Portraits which is featured on the album called Permanence. The album entered the Australian Albums charts peaking at no. 45.

In January and February 2015 the band supported American rock band Chiodos during their Australian tour. In March the sixtet supported In Hearts Wake before touring Australia as headlining act for the first time.

Vocalist Daniel Breen announced his departure through letters directly to the bands closest fans in early 2016. This marked a new musical direction for the band as the band moved away from their previous metalcore/post-hardcore sound. The band later announced their follow-up record Sin Will Find You which was set for release on 5 August of the same year. The album peaked at no. 30 in the Australian Albums charts. The band supported Pierce the Veil on their Australian run of their world tour in promotion of their fourth record Misadventures along with an Australian headliner tour

On 10 January 2017 the band released a video on their Facebook page announcing that drummer Alex Trail will be leaving the band, whose last show would be at the bands set at UNIFY Gathering 2017.

On 18 November 2018 the band announced that they would be disbanding after a final Australian Tour with their "Permanence-era" line up in 2019. The band cited each member had desires to move onto future endeavours. Vocalist William Jarratt has started a solo project under the name Saint Rien, and guitarist Andy Szetho has started a dream pop project under the name Soft Powder. Harsh vocalist Daniel Breen formed new project called Steadfast.

== Musical style ==
Storm the Sky's music is describable as atmospheric metalcore, while the guitars are described as progressive. On their second album the band combined their natural metalcore style with influences from Death rock and Pop music which led the atmospheric sound to be more in foreground. The dark-sounding synthesizer has been compared to U2, while the dynamics in their songs can be compared to hardcore act letlive.

== Members ==
Final Lineup

- William Jarratt – clean vocals (2011–2019), lead vocals (2016–2019)
- Andy Szetho – lead guitar (2011–2019)
- Benny Craib – bass (2013–2019)
- Lachlan Avis – rhythm guitar (2014–2019), keyboards (2016–2019)

Former

- Kristian Evagelistis – bass (2011–2013)
- Billy Green – rhythm guitar (2011–2014)
- Daniel Breen – unclean vocals (2011–2016)
- Alex Trail – drums (2011–2017)

== Discography ==
- 2012: Storm the Sky (MCD, Self-released)
- 2013: Vigilance (EP, Self-released)
- 2015: Permanence (Album, UNFD/Rise Records)
- 2016: Sin Will Find You (Album, UNFD/Rise Records)
