= Hand of Mercy =

Australian band

Hand Of Mercy
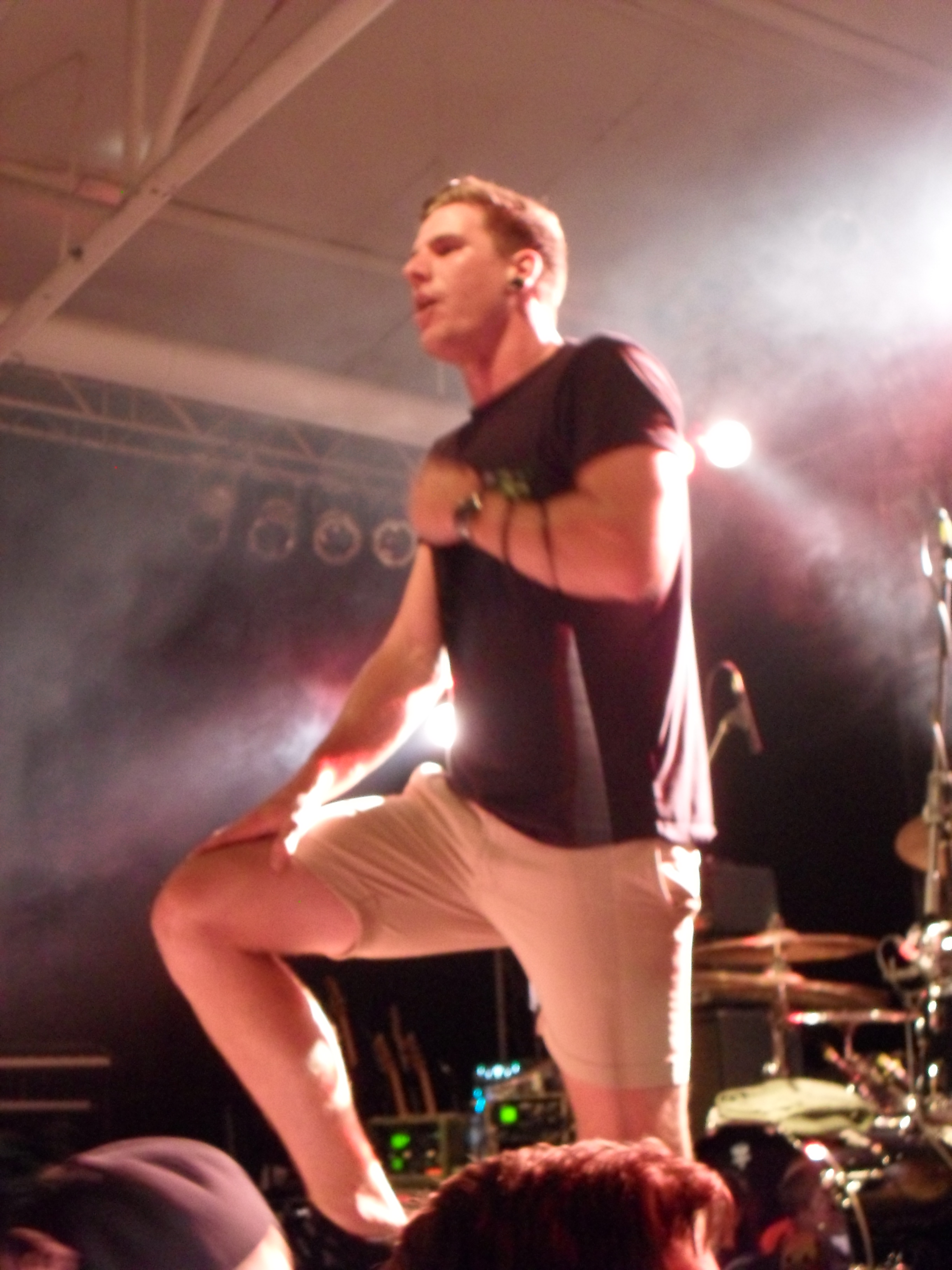
- Scott (Sänger der Band Hand of Mercy) während der Never Say Die! Tour 2013 in der Essigfabrik, Köln

Background information
- Origin: Sydney, New South Wales, Australia
- Genres: Hardcore punk, post hardcore, melodic hardcore
- Years active: 2007–2016
- Labels: UNFD, Rise Records
- Past members: Scott Bird; Adam Mclean; Cullum Jensen Mackinnon; Michael Dawson; Josh Zimmer; Adam van den Crust; Joshua Campiao; Nick Bellringer
- Website: www.facebook.com/handofmercy/

Hand Of Mercy were an Australian hardcore band from Sydney, formed in 2007. Formerly signed to the UNFD label. Hand of Mercy released three full-length albums, and two EPs, and toured extensively throughout Australia and internationally.

== History ==
Hand of Mercy formed when guitarist Adam McLean and friend drummer Josh Zimmer started playing together. The pair advertised for musicians with similar influences and found guitarist Joshua Campiao. At a Parkway Drive show Josh Zimmer met Scott Bird and invited him to audition as a vocalist. Bird then introduced his friend Adam van den Crust, a bassist.

For several years Hand of Mercy played at hardcore venues around Sydney, and appeared at youth centres throughout the state. They began appearing as opening acts for established groups. They released two EP's Trash the Party and Scum of the Earth in 2007 and 2008 respectively. In 2010 Hand of Mercy were hired to play the annual Resist Records Sydney Hardcore Festival.

Hand of Mercy's first album, The Fallout was released through Dogfight Records and the band toured in March 2011 to promote the record. Zimmer announced his departure from the band and his drumming duties were passed on to Cullum Jensen CJ Mackinnon. The band went on to play with the group A Day to Remember at the Big Top in Luna Park. In August 2011 Hand of Mercy supported For the Fallen Dreams and were then joined well-known band Parkway Drive on the 'Sick Summer' tour in December.

In 2012 Hand of Mercy traveled to the USA and recorded in Cape Cod, Massachusetts with producer Shane Frisby. In June 2012 van den Crust left the band and was replaced by his friend Michael Dawson. Shortly after, the band signed with UNFD, which released the second studio album 'Last Lights' on 17 August. 'Last Lights' spent a week on the Australian Albums Chart at number 44. By August the band were touring again supporting UNFD label mates Dream On, Dreamer nationwide.

In 2013 Hand of Mercy toured throughout Australia, Europe and the UK. In January the band supported Deez Nuts and Comeback Kid in the annual Australian nationwide Boys of Summer Tour. This was followed by an overseas support spot in April for Bleeding Through on their European and UK Farewell Europe tour including dates on the Hit The Deck festival. Returning to Australia, Hand of Mercy appeared in the mini festival Destroy The Music in May with The Ghost Inside.

In 2014, Bird left the band, and the group recorded an album, Resolve, with a new vocalist, Nick Bellringer. and a video for the track Desperate Measures in 2014. They released a single, Axis, ahead of time to promote the album.

In 2015, Campiao left to join the Hellions; however, the band continued performing and touring.

Hand of Mercy have announced plans to break up after a final show on 30 January 2016 at Sydney's Strike Hard Festival, when they will be joined by former vocalist Scott Bird.

== Band members ==
Final Lineup

- Scott Bird – Vocals (2007–2014, 2015–2016)
- Adam Mclean – Guitar (2007–2016)
- Cullum Jensen (CJ) Mackinnon – Drums (2011–2016)
- Michael Dawson – Bass Guitar (2012–2016)

Former members

- Joshua Zimmer – Drums (2007–2011)
- Adam van den Crust – Bass Guitar (2007–2012)
- Joshua Campiao – Guitar (2007–2015)
- Nick Bellringer – Vocals (2014–2015)

== Discography ==
Studio albums

- The Fallout (2011)
- Last Lights (2012)
- Resolve (2014)

EPs

- Trash the Party (2007)
- Scum of the Earth (2008)
