= Rise Records =

American record label

- Parent company: BMG Rights Management
- Founded: 1991
- Founder: Craig Ericson
- Status: Active
- Distributors: Universal Music Group (physical); BMG Rights Management (digital)
- Genre: Alternative rock, heavy metal, punk rock
- Country of origin: United States
- Location: Beaverton, Oregon
- Official website: riserecords.com

Rise Records is an American record label currently based in Beaverton, Oregon, mainly focusing on alternative rock, heavy metal, and punk rock music artists.

== History ==
Rise was founded in 1991 by Craig Ericson in Nevada City, California. He released a small number of 7-inch records before putting the label on hiatus to attend college. Ericson didn't release anything further until 1999, after moving to Portland, Oregon. He began issuing small-print 7" records, and his first CD release came in 2000, from the group One Last Thing.

Rise Records' releases are distributed in the U.S. by ADA and BMG. In July 2013, the company moved from Portland to neighboring Beaverton, Oregon. The label has a distribution deal with Alternative Distribution Alliance, the indie distributor owned by Warner Music Group and directly in Europe and Australia with Warner Music and BMG.

On 9 September, Australian label UNFD announced a distribution partnership with Rise. On 18 May 2015, BMG announced the acquisition of the label. Rise maintained its headquarters and Ericson remained in charge.

On 8 December 2017, Craig Ericson announced his departure from the label. Sean Heydorn stepped up and took over Rise Records.

In 2020, Rise Records moved their operation into the BMG Los Angeles office, located at 5670 Wilshire Blvd, where Sean Heydorn continues to oversee the label today.

On February 18, 2021, Rise Records announced a partnership with Blue Swan Records which is founded by Dance Gavin Dance guitarist Will Swan.

== Notable artists ==
=== Current ===
- The Acacia Strain
- Alkaline Trio
- American Nightmare
- Angels & Airwaves
- Billy Howerdel
- Blessthefall
- Chuck Ragan
- Covey
- Crown the Empire
- Currents
- Dance Gavin Dance
- Dave Hause
- The Distillers
- Flogging Molly
- Gone Is Gone
- Haunted Mouths
- I Promised the World
- Jetty Bones
- Keith Wallen
- Kim Dracula
- Kublai Khan
- Kvelertak
- Ladrones
- Le Butcherettes
- Mark Morton
- Memphis May Fire
- Miyavi
- Placebo
- Polyphia
- PUP
- Royal Coda
- Secret Band
- Siiickbrain
- Sleeping with Sirens
- Spiritbox
- Tiger Army
- Touché Amoré
- Tilian
- Wolf & Bear

=== Former ===
- 7 Seconds (active)
- Abandon All Ships (disbanded)
- Acceptance (active, Equal Vision Records)
- AFI (active, Run for Cover Records)
- Alive Like Me (disbanded)
- American Me (active, unsigned)
- Arlington (active, unsigned)
- At the Drive-In (on hiatus)
- Attack Attack! (active, Oxide Records)
- At the Throne of Judgment (disbanded)
- Before Their Eyes (active, InVogue Records)
- Black Peaks (disbanded)
- The Bled (active)
- Bleeding Through (active, SharpTone Records)
- The Bouncing Souls (active, Pure Noise Records)
- Breathe Carolina (active, Spinnin' Records)
- Burden of a Day (disbanded)
- Buried in Verona (disbanded)
- Cane Hill (active, Out of Line Music)
- Tyler Carter
- Casey (active, Hassle Records)
- Cheap Girls (disbanded)
- Chelsea Grin (active, unsigned)
- Circa Survive (disbanded)
- Coretta Scott (disbanded)
- Jonny Craig
- The Color Morale (active, Fearless Records)
- DangerKids (active, Paid Vacation Records)
- Dead Letter Circus
- Decoder (disbanded)
- The Devil Wears Prada (active, Solid State Records)
- A Different Breed of Killer (active, unsigned)
- Dream On, Dreamer (active, independent)
- Drop Dead, Gorgeous (disbanded)
- Daytrader (on hiatus)
- Dualesc (disbanded)
- The Early November (active, Pure Noise Records)
- Eidola (active, 3DOT Recordings)
- Eighteen Visions (active, unsigned)
- Emarosa (active, Out of Line Music)
- Ever We Fall (disbanded)
- Evergreen Terrace (active)
- Face to Face (active, Fat Wreck Chords)
- Fear Before (on hiatus)
- Fire from the Gods (active, Better Noise Music)
- The Flatliners (active, Dine Alone Records and Fat Wreck Chords)
- For the Fallen Dreams (active, Arising Empire)
- From First to Last (active, Fearless Records)
- Further Seems Forever (active, Iodine Recordings)
- Goldfinger (active, Big Noise)
- Hand of Mercy (disbanded)
- Hands Like Houses (active)
- Here I Come Falling (disbanded)
- Hot Water Music (active, Equal Vision Records)
- I Can Make a Mess
- In Fear and Faith (on hiatus)
- In Hearts Wake (active, UNFD)
- Isles & Glaciers (disbanded, vinyl release only)
- Issues (disbanded)
- It Prevails (active, Stay Sick Recordings)
- The Jealous Sound (disbanded)
- Kevin Seconds
- Knuckle Puck (active, Wax Bodega)
- Like Moths to Flames (active, UNFD)
- The Living End
- Make Do and Mend
- Make Them Suffer (active, Greyscale & SharpTone)
- Makeout (active, unsigned)
- Man Overboard
- Matty Mullins (active in Memphis May Fire & on Black River Entertainment)
- Mayday Parade (active, Many Hats Endeavors)
- MikeyWhiskeyHands
- Misser
- Miss May I (active, Solid State Records)
- Mothica (active, SharpTone Records)
- The Movielife (active, unsigned)
- My Ticket Home (active, Spinefarm Records)
- Northlane (active, Worldeater Records)
- Oceana (now known as Polyenso)
- Of Machines (disbanded)
- Of Mice & Men (active, Century Media)
- Only Crime
- Orange Island (disbanded)
- Palisades (disbanded)
- Piebald
- The Plot in You (active, Fearless Records)
- PMtoday (disbanded)
- Poison the Well (active, SharpTone Records)
- Polar Bear Club (on hiatus)
- Pvris (active, Hopeless Records)
- Rarity
- The Red Shore (disbanded)
- Secrets (active, Velocity Records)
- Sevendust (active, Napalm Records)
- Sharks (disbanded)
- Silverstein (active, UNFD)
- Small Towns Burn a Little Slower (disbanded)
- Storm the Sky (disbanded)
- Sum 41 (disbanded)
- SWMRS (active, Fueled by Ramen)
- T.S.O.L.
- Take the Crown (disbanded)
- Teenage Bottlerocket (active, Fat Wreck Chords)
- That's Outrageous! (disbanded)
- This Is Hell (active, Trustkill Records)
- Thousand Below (active)
- Tides of Man (active, unsigned)
- Transit (disbanded)
- Woe, Is Me (active, SBG Records)
- You Me at Six (disbanded)
- Your Demise (disbanded)

== See also ==
- List of record labels
- Risecore, a metalcore subgenre associated with the record label and the Warped Tour scene
