= Buried in Verona =

Australian metalcore band

- Origin: Sydney, New South Wales, Australia
- Genres: Metalcore, post-hardcore, emo
- Years active: 2007–2016
- Labels: Riot! Entertainment, UNFD
- Past members: Brett Anderson; Mick Taylor; Katongo Chituta; Scott Richmond; Steve Rogers; Chris Mellross; Shane O'Brien; Nate Martin; Sean Gynn; Daniel Gynn; Conor Ward; Richie Newman; Andrew Gill; Mick Taylor; Ben Bailey; Cole Wilkins

Buried in Verona were an Australian metalcore band from Sydney, New South Wales, Australia, formed in 2007. They have released five albums, the most recent being Vultures Above, Lions Below, released in August 2015. In August 2016, UNFD, their signed record company, announced on their Facebook page that the band was breaking up.

== History ==
=== 2007–2008: Beginnings ===
Buried in Verona formed in 2007 by vocalist Brett Anderson, guitarists Mick Taylor and Katongo Chituta, bassist Scott Richmond and drummer Steve Rogers. All the members were acquainted through the high school community in the suburb of Engadine in south Sydney. After a relatively short period of live performances, during which they gained support slots for Australian bands Daysend, Toe To Toe and Frankenbok, the band released their debut album Circle The Dead in 2008. After the recording period in Melbourne, Steve Rogers was ejected from the group unceremoniously due to a serious back injury, which required surgery. Richie Newman, who co-produced the album along with Greg Stace, is credited as the drummer in the liner notes. Newman would later join the band officially as third guitarist. Chris Melross would eventually join the line-up as their drummer.

Buried in Verona has featured in the "Top 25 Bands to Look Out For" list in both the December 2009 and December 2010 editions of Blunt Magazine.

=== 2010–2011: Saturday Night Sever ===
Following the trend set by genre peers Parkway Drive and I Killed the Prom Queen, the band made the decision to relocate overseas with the purpose of recording their second album. Saturday Night Sever was recorded and produced by Fredrik Nordström at his studio Studio Fredman in Gothenburg, Sweden. After a 5-week production period, the album was released in June 2010 to positive reviews, with the band's musicianship and production values they had invested in being praised, even though some critics brushed off the release as a generic metalcore album. Upon their return to Australia later that year, the band enjoyed regular Sydney support slots for internationally touring heavy metal bands including Whitechapel, Soilwork, Escape the Fate and The Haunted. In 2011 they co-headlined an Australia tour with Resist The Thought, dubbed the "I Wanna Give It Tour".

In 2011 singer Brett Anderson has also featured in a song made by the Swedish band Solitude called "Last Division".

=== 2012–2013: Notorious ===
On 20 July 2011 Buried In Verona announced on their official Facebook page that they had parted ways with members Mick Taylor and Kat Chituta. Sean Gynn and Nate Martin were announced as their replacements. Newman openly admitted that the departure of these members meant the band was due for a change in musical style. With the intention of returning to Sweden to record again with Fredrik Nordström, the band prepared for an Australian Farewell Tour with The Amity Affliction. On 27 August 2011, days before its commencement, another Facebook post simply stated "Our bass player is currently in RPA hospital, smashed himself through a glass window because he likes to party. Hope he's ok..." Although never officially announced, Scott Richmond had been quickly replaced by Daniel Gynn on bass. With three founding members suddenly gone, Brett Anderson was left sole-remaining original member in the line-up.

Following the band's first European tour with Canada's Liferuiner, the band returned to Studio Fredman in Gothenburg, Sweden to begin a gruelling 3 month writing and recording process. Their third album, Notorious was released on 1 June 2012 following the band's signing to Australian label UNFD. The band's stylistic change, moving away from the band's metalcore origins towards a stripped back, musically more diverse approach to songwriting, was praised by critics as a sign of maturity. Anderson's revised hardcore punk vocal style and Newman's increased clean vocal presence was also duly noted. The band featured The Amity Affliction's Ahren Stringer on the track "Can't Let It Go".

Expecting fan backlash, especially those who were more akin to their older metalcore style, Newman openly acknowledged the change, stating that the band's attitude during the recording was "Fuck it. Write what you want to write, put your emotions into it and whatever happens happens. If you want to do something funky or jazzy or you think this part needs to be emotional or aggressive do whatever you want." Having debuted on the ARIA Music Charts at #20 Notorious was nominated for Best Hard Rock/Heavy Metal Album at the annual ARIA Music Awards in 2012, but lost to DZ Deathrays Bloodstreams. Returning to Australia in late June, the band began rigorous touring schedule. In July, it was announced via Facebook that drummer Chris Melross had left the band and Shane O'Brien moved in as his replacement. On 11 September 2012, Artery Recordings announced they had signed Buried In Verona for North American representation. The band toured the U.S for the first time in November that year and again in 2013.

In February 2013, Buried In Verona have announced that Shane O'Brien had left the band to join I Killed The Prom Queen as their drum technician, and then their full time drummer, leaving the band without an official drummer.

In June 2013, Buried In Verona announced on their official Facebook page that drummer Conor Ward, would now be joining the band as their full-time drummer. Conor appeared in Buried In Verona's music video for their new song 'I Am Hate'. Buried In Verona toured with I Killed The Prom Queen, House Vs Hurricane (last tour), and Saviour on the 'East Coast Rampage Tour' across the east coast of Australia. The band was set to record new music with Joey Sturgis in September.

=== 2014–2015: Faceless ===
On 28 November 2013 the band released a brand new song titled "Splintered", that hadn't appeared on their reissue of Notorious. The video titles "Part I: Splintered", insinuating that there would be a second part to the song and music video.

On 16 January 2014 the band announced that their fourth studio album entitled Faceless would be released on 7 March through UNFD and Artery Recordings. On 22 January the band released a brand new single titled "Illuminate". The music video was the second part of the two-part project with Splintered. Preorders for the new album were made available on 23 January.

On 12 January 2015 Daniel and Sean Gynn announced their departure from the band on good terms, leaving the band as a three piece. Buried In Verona was scheduled to headline Shorefest in Sydney on 18 April 2015.

=== 2015–2016: Vultures Above, Lions Below and breakup ===
On 30 June 2015 the band released a brand new single. It was the first music video since the release of Illuminate, in a year and a half. The song was titled "Can't Be Unsaid" and is a lot more mellow as opposed to their previous work. The band have strayed away from their metalcore roots with this song and wrote a more rock-based ballad, similar to the style of a couple previous songs such as 'Lionheart' and 'Set Me On Fire'. Along with the launch of their new song, the band released the artwork, the title, and pre-orders for the album. The album was confirmed to be titled "Vultures Above, Lions Below". In December 2015 Richie Newman announced on Buried in Verona's official Facebook page that he was leaving the band.

== Members ==
Final line-up

- Brett Anderson – lead vocals (2007–2016)
- Mick Taylor – lead guitar (2007–2011, 2016)
- Andrew Gill – rhythm guitar (2016)
- Cole Wilkins – bass (2016)
- Ben Bailey – drums (2016)

Former

- Steve Rogers – drums (2007–2008)
- Katongo Chituta – rhythm guitar (2007–2011)
- Scott Richmond – bass (2007–2011)
- Richie Newman – clean vocals, rhythm guitar (2010–2015)
- Chris Mellross – drums (2009–2012)
- Nate Martin – rhythm guitar (2011–2013)
- Daniel Gynn – lead guitar (2013–2015), bass (2011–2013)
- Sean Gynn – bass (2013–2015), lead guitar (2011–2013)
- Shane O'Brien – drums (2012–2013)
- Conor Ward – drums (2013–2015)
- Mark Harris – lead guitar, backing vocals (2015)
- Brandon Martel – bass (2015)
- James Swanson – drums (2015)

== Discography ==
=== Studio albums ===
List of studio albums, with selected chart positions
Title	Album details	Peak chart positions
Title	Album details	AUS
Circle the Dead	Released: 2008; Label: Riot! Entertainment (RIOT035CD); Formats: CD, digital download	-
Saturday Night Sever	Released: 2010; Label: Riot! Entertainment (RIOTCD004); Formats: CD, digital download	-
Notorious	Released: June 2012; Label: We Are Unified (UNFD017); Formats: CD, CD+DVD, LP, digital download	20
Faceless	Released: March 2014; Label: We Are Unified (UNFD039); Formats: CD, digital download	15
Vultures Above, Lions Below	Released: August 2015; Label: We Are Unified (UNFD061); Formats: CD, digital download	17

== Awards and nominations ==
=== ARIA Music Awards ===
The ARIA Music Awards are a set of annual ceremonies presented by Australian Recording Industry Association (ARIA), which recognise excellence, innovation, and achievement across all genres of the music of Australia. They commenced in 1987.

Year	Nominee / work	Award	Result	Ref.
2012	Notorious	Best Hard Rock or Heavy Metal Album	Nominated	
