= Hellions (band) =

Australian hardcore punk band

- Origin: Sydney, Australia
- Genres: Post-hardcore, alternative rock, alternative metal, melodic hardcore, metalcore
- Years active: 2013–present
- Label: UNFD
- Members: Dre Faivre; Matthew Gravolin; Anthony Caruso; Josh Campiao
- Past members: Lewis Usher; Dylan Stark; Chris Moretti

Hellions are an Australian punk rock band from Sydney, formed in 2013 after the break up of The Bride, in which drummer Anthony Caruso, bassist turned vocalist Dre Faivre and guitarist/vocalist Matt Gravolin continued under a different moniker.

They have released four studio albums; their third, Opera Oblivia, was nominated for the 2016 ARIA Award for Best Hard Rock/Heavy Metal Album. Rue, their fourth studio album, was released on 19 October 2018 via UNFD.

== Discography ==
=== Studio albums ===
List of studio albums, with selected chart positions
Title	Album details	Peak chart positions
Title	Album details	AUS
Die Young	Released: 20 September 2013; Label: UNFD	49
Indian Summer	Released: 30 January 2015; Label: UNFD	19
Opera Oblivia	Released: 29 July 2016; Label: UNFD	4
Rue	Released: 19 October 2018; Label: UNFD	23
"—" denotes a recording that did not chart.

=== Singles ===
Title	Year	Album
"Quality of Life"	2016	Opera Oblivia
"24 / Jesus of Suburbia"	2017	Opera Oblivia
"X (Mwah)"	2018	Rue
"Smile"	2018	Rue
"Furrow"	2018	Rue
"Fear Flow"	2026	N/A

=== Music videos ===
Year	Song	Director
2013	"Infamita"	Chris Elder
2013	"The Penultimate Year"	Ed Reiss
2014	"22"	
2014	"Hellions"	Adam Davis Powell
2015	"Nottingham"	Chris Elder
2016	"Quality of Life"	Neal Walters
2017	"Thresher"	Mark Forrer
2018	"Smile"	Aimée-Lee X. Curran
2018	"X (Mwah)"	Neal Walters

== Awards and nominations ==
=== AIR Awards ===
The Australian Independent Record Awards (commonly known informally as AIR Awards) is an annual awards night to recognise, promote and celebrate the success of Australia's Independent Music sector.

Year	Nominee / work	Award	Result
2017	Opera Oblivia	Best Independent Hard Rock, Heavy or Punk Album	Nominated

=== ARIA Awards ===
The Australian Recording Industry Association Music Awards is an annual series of awards nights celebrating the Australian music industry, put on by the Australian Recording Industry Association.

Year	Nominee / work	Award	Result
2016	Opera Oblivia	Best Hard Rock / Heavy Metal Album	Nominated
