= UNFD =

Australian music label

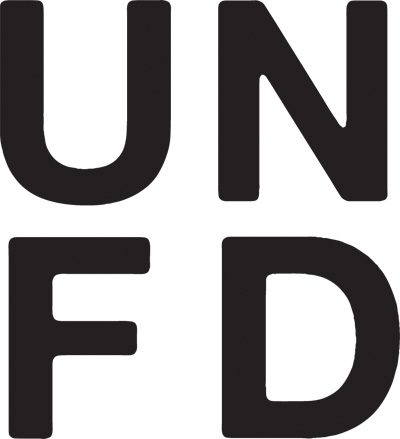
- Parent company: UNIFIED Music Group
- Founded: 2011
- Founder: Jaddan Comerford
- Distributor: The Orchard
- Genre: Metalcore, punk rock, progressive metal, alternative rock
- Country of origin: Australia
- Location: Melbourne, Victoria
- Official website: unfdcentral.com

UNFD (pronounced as an initialism [ /ˈjuːˈenˈefˈdiː/ ]) is an independent record label based in Melbourne, Australia. The label is home to a number of Australian artists including Thornhill, Ocean Grove, Hellions and In Hearts Wake, and international artists ERRA, Stray From the Path, Silverstein, Invent Animate, and more. The label has offices in London and Los Angeles.

UNFD is part of the UNIFIED Music Group, owned by Jaddan Comerford. Genres that the label lean towards include, but are not limited to; metalcore, electronicore, progressive metal and djent.

== Overview ==
UNFD's first release was Dream On Dreamer's Heartbound on 5 August 2011. The album debuted at No. 38 on the ARIA Charts and was nominated for Best Heavy Rock Album of the Year at the ARIA Music Awards.

In April 2013, the label released Northlane's hit album Singularity via a marketing campaign that was critically acclaimed across Australian media. The album debuted at No. 3 on the ARIA Charts. Shortly after, UNFD announced the signing of Gold Record artist Dead Letter Circus, and also announced that The Amity Affliction's albums Youngbloods and Chasing Ghosts album had been certified gold in Australia.

In August 2013, the label had major success with Dead Letter Circus' album The Catalyst Fire reaching No. 2 on the ARIA charts. Following from this success, the label announced the return of Bodyjar with a new album to be released 4 October.

In July 2015, UNFD had its first #1 Australian album with the release of Northlane's third studio album Node. The label also had its first ever ARIA award win that same year, also with Northlane's Node. That same year, the label had a total of 4 ARIA Award nominations: Northlane's Node, Thy Art Is Murder's Holy War, and In Hearts Wake's Skydancer all in the Hard Rock category, as well as Dead Letter Circus' Aesthesis in the Rock category.

In 2017, the label released Mesmer, the fourth album from Northlane, via a surprise release. The album debuted at #3 on the ARIA chart in a very competitive week and took the band's fans completely by surprise. The release was not only critically acclaimed, but the release process itself was covered heavily by the media. Northlane went on to win their second ARIA Award in the Best Hard Rock/Heavy Metal category.

The label was nominated for Best Independent Label at the 2017 AIR Awards, and Hellions' Opera Oblivia was nominated for Best Hard Rock Album.

Throughout 2017 and 2018, UNFD broadened its artist base, with artists such as Tonight Alive, Dream State, Woes, Thornhill, LIMBS, Slowly Slowly and more. The label was again nominated for Best Independent Label at the 2018 AIR Awards.

In March 2019, UNFD announced the worldwide signing of Frank Iero, former guitarist of My Chemical Romance, and his band The Future Violents.

In September 2019, UNFD announced the worldwide signing of Like Moths to Flames.

== Current artist roster ==
- (Australia) Alienist
- (Spain) Ankor
- (United States) AVOID
- (Japan) DED
- (United States) Dreamwake
- (United States) ERRA
- (United States) Ghost Atlas
- (United States) Invent Animate
- (United States) Like Moths to Flames
- (United States) PEUR
- (Canada) RUNE
- (Canada) Silverstein
- (Japan) SiM
- (Australia) Thornhill

== Former artists ==
- After Touch
- Antagonist A.D. (on Greyscale Records)
- Architects (on Epitaph Records)
- The Amity Affliction (on Pure Noise Records)
- Balance and Composure (inactive)
- Banks Arcade (independent)
- Beartooth (on Red Bull Records)
- Bodyjar (on Pile of Sand Records)
- The Brave
- The Bride (inactive)
- Buried in Verona (disbanded)
- Columbus
- Crossfaith
- Cursed Earth
- Dead Letter Circus (on Warner Music Australia)
- D at Sea
- Deez Nuts (on Century Media Records)
- Dream On, Dreamer
- Dream State
- Drown This City (disbanded)
- Frank Iero
- The Getaway Plan
- Grove Street
- Hacktivist
- Hand of Mercy (disbanded)
- Hands Like Houses
- Hellions
- Hollow Front
- HourHouse
- House Vs. Hurricane
- I Am Zero (inactive)
- I Killed the Prom Queen (disbanded)
- In Hearts Wake
- Introvert
- LIMBS
- Make Believe Me
- Moodring (on SharpTone Records)
- Northlane (Independent)
- Ocean Grove (on SharpTone Records)
- October Ends
- PhaseOne (Sounds of Mayhem Recordings)
- Reece Young
- Saviour (on Greyscale Records)
- Short Stack
- Silent Planet (Independent)
- Sleep Talk
- Sleep Waker (disbanded)
- Slowly Slowly
- Stories (disbanded)
- Storm the Sky (disbanded)
- Stray from the Path (disbanded)
- Thy Art Is Murder (on Human Warfare)
- Tonight Alive
- Trade Wind
- Tropic Gold
- Up Late
- Vatican (disbanded)
- Void of Vision (disbanded)
- We Came as Romans (on SharpTone Records)
- While She Sleeps (on Sleeps Brothers)
- Woes
- The Xcerts
- Yours Truly

== Discography ==
- Dream On, Dreamer - Heartbound (5 August 2011)
- The Getaway Plan - Other Voices, Other Rooms (9 February 2008)
- The Amity Affliction - Youngbloods (deluxe edition) (30 September 2011)
- I Killed the Prom Queen - Music for the Recently Deceased (deluxe edition) (1 May 2011)
- We Came as Romans - Understanding What We've Grown to Be (Sept 30, 2011)
- The Summer Set - Everything's Fine (October, 2011)
- The Bride - President Rd (28 October 2011)
- The Getaway Plan - Requiem (4 November 2011)
- Northlane - Discoveries (11 November 2011)
- Deez Nuts - Fuck the World (20 March 2012)
- Buried in Verona - Notorious (1 June 2012)
- House vs. Hurricane - Crooked Teeth (13 July 2012)
- Hand of Mercy - Last Lights (17 August 2012)
- In Hearts Wake - Divination (31 August 2012)
- The Amity Affliction - Chasing Ghosts (7 September 2012)
- Dream On, Dreamer - Heartbound (deluxe edition) (CD/DVD) (30 November 2012)
- Deez Nuts - "Band of Brothers"/"Shot After Shot" (9 January 2013)
- D at Sea - Unconscious (8 March 2013)
- Northlane - Singularity (22 March 2013)
- Deez Nuts - Bout It! (29 March 2013)
- Buried in Verona - Notorious: Reloaded (14 June 2013)
- Dream On, Dreamer - Loveless (28 June 2013)
- Misery Signals - Absent Light (26 July 2013)
- Dead Letter Circus - The Catalyst Fire (9 August 2013)
- Hellions - Die Young (20 September 2013)
- Saviour - First Light to My Death Bed (4 October 2013)
- Bodyjar - Role Model (18 October 2013)
- Make Believe Me - Where the Heart Is (18 October 2013)
- Hacktivist - Hacktivist (EP) (8 November 2013)
- Stories - "Dreamwork" (single) (30 January 2014)
- Make Believe Me - Disconnect (EP) (21 February 2014)
- Buried in Verona - Faceless (7 March 2014)
- Architects - Lost Forever // Lost Together (14 March 2014)
- In Hearts Wake - Earthwalker (2 May 2014)
- Northlane - Singularity (deluxe edition) (16 May 2014)
- Trade Wind - Suffer Just to Believe (13 June 2014)
- Beartooth - Disgusting (13 June 2014)
- I Am Zero - "The Winter Sun" (single) (11 July 2014)
- D at Sea - Anchors & Diamonds (11 July 2014)
- Anberlin - lowborn (25 July 2014)
- The One Hundred - Subculture (EP) (29 August 2014)
- Dead Letter Circus - Stand Apart (EP) (29 August 2014)
- Hand of Mercy - Resolve (31 October 2014)
- Storm the Sky - Permanence (16 January 2015)
- Hellions - Indian Summer (30 January 2015)
- Architects - Lost Forever // Lost Together (deluxe edition) (27 March 2015)
- In Hearts Wake - Skydancer (1 May 2015)
- Thy Art Is Murder - Holy War (26 June 2015)
- Northlane - Node (24 July 2015)
- Stray from the Path - Subliminal Criminals (14 August 2015)
- Stories - The Youth to Become (14 August 2015)
- Buried in Verona - Vultures Above, Lions Below (7 August 2015)
- Dead Letter Circus - Aesthesis (14 August 2015)
- Crossfaith - Xeno (18 September 2015)
- Hands Like Houses - Dissonants (26 February 2016)
- Hacktivist - Outside the Box (4 March 2016)
- Architects - All Our Gods Have Abandoned Us (27 May 2016)
- Northlane & In Hearts Wake - Equinox (EP) (20 April 2016)
- Beartooth - Aggressive (3 June 2016)
- Trade Wind - You Make Everything Disappear (15 July 2016)
- Hellions - Opera Oblivia (29 July 2016)
- The Brave - Epoch (5 August 2016)
- Storm the Sky - Sin Will Find You (5 August 2016)
- Columbus - Spring Forever (26 August 2016)
- Balance and Composure - Light We Made (7 October 2016)
- Void of Vision - Children of Chrome (30 September 2016)
- Saviour - Let Me Leave (13 January 2017)
- Ocean Grove - The Rhapsody Tapes (3 February 2017)
- Crossfaith - "New Age Warriors" (remix) (10 February 2017)
- Northlane - Mesmer (24 March 2017)
- Columbus - Next to Me (EP) (28 April 2017)
- While She Sleeps - You Are We (21 April 2017)
- In Hearts Wake - Ark (26 May 2017)
- House vs. Hurricane - Filth (2 June 2017)
- Cursed Earth - Cycles of Grief Volume I: Growth (4 August 2017)
- Crossfaith - Freedom (EP) (4 August 2017)
- Stray from the Path - Only Death Is Real (8 September 2017)
- Cursed Earth - Cycles of Grief Volume II: Decay (22 September 2017)
- Easy Life - There Can't Be This Much Water in the Sky (29 September 2017)
- Bodyjar - Terra Firma (EP) (13 October 2017)
- Introvert - December (19 October 2017)
- Cursed Earth - Cycles of Grief: Complete Collection (20 October 2017)
- Void of Vision - Disturbia (EP) (10 November 2017)
- Saviour - Empty Skies (14 November 2017)
- Various Artists - Spawn (Again): A Tribute to Silverchair (17 November 2017)
- Dream State - White Lies (Re-issue) (1 December 2017)
- Tonight Alive - Underworld (12 January 2018)
- Crossfaith - Wipeout (EP) (26 January 2018)
- In Hearts Wake - Ark Prevails (EP) (2 February 2018)
- Hellions - "X (Mwah)" (6 February 2018)
- Thornhill - Butterfly (16 February 2018)
- Northlane - Analog Future (live) (16 March 2018)
- LIMBS - Father's Son (27 April 2018)
- Woes - Self Help (4 May 2018)
- Slowly Slowly - St. Leonards (11 May 2018)
- Dream State - Recovery (EP) (18 May 2018)
- Columbus - A Hot Take on Heartbreak (25 May 2018)
- In Hearts Wake - Ark (deluxe edition) (8 June 2018)
- Northlane - "Vultures" (13 July 2018)
- Crossfaith - EX_MACHINA (3 August 2018)
- After Touch - "You Wish This Was About You" (7 September 2018)
- Beartooth - Disease (28 September 2018)
- Hands Like Houses - Anon (12 October 2018)
- Hellions - "Rue" (19 October 2018)
- Silent Planet - "When the End Began" (2 November 2018)
- Architects - Holy Hell (9 November 2018)
- Void of Vision - "Kill All My Friends" (single) (28 November 2018)
- Ocean Grove - "Glass Gloss" (single) (14 December 2018)
- Crossfaith - "Soul Seeker" (single) (14 December 2018)
- Ocean Grove - "Ask for the Anthem" (single) (6 February 2019)
- While She Sleeps - So What? (1 March 2019)
- Dream State - "Hand in Hand" (single) (6 March 2019)
- LIMBS - "Abandoned" (single) (29 March 2019)
- Thornhill - "Coven" (single) (4 April 2019)
- The Brave - Aura (5 April 2019)
- Woes - "Suburbs" (single) (9 April 2019)
- Hacktivist - "Reprogram" (single) (10 April 2019)
- Yours Truly - "Afterglow" (12 April 2019)
- Slowly Slowly - "Jellyfish" (16 April 2019)
- Sleep Talk - "Everything in Colour" (3 May 2019)
- Cursed Earth - "The Deathbed Sessions" (31 May 2019)
- Frank Iero and the Future Violents - "Barriers" (31 May 2019)
- Northlane - Alien (2 August 2019)
- Void of Vision - Hyperdaze (13 September 2019)
- Dream State - Primrose Path (18 October 2019)
- Thornhill - The Dark Pool (25 October 2019)
- Stray from the Path - Internal Atomics (1 November 2019)
- Like Moths to Flames - Where the Light Refuses to Go (13 November 2019)
- Northlane - Enemy of the Night (single) (20 May 2020)
- Northlane - Alien (Deluxe Edition) (31 July 2020)
- Like Moths to Flames - No Eternity in Gold (30 October 2020)
- ERRA - ERRA (19 March 2021)
- Sleep Waker - Alias (23 July 2021)
- Void of Vision - Chronicles I: Lust (EP) (22 October 2021)
- Sleep Waker - "Distance (ReImagined)" (single) (2 December 2021)
- ERRA - Erra Deluxe (Album) (18 March 2022)
- Void of Vision - Chronicles II: Heaven (EP) (29 April 2022)
- Silverstein (band) - Misery Made Me (Album) (6 May 2022)
- Hollow Front - The Price of Dreaming (Album) (27 May 2022)
- Thornhill (band) - Heroine (Album) (3 June 2022)
- Moodring - Stargazer (Album) (10 June 2022)
- Vatican - Ultra (Album) (17 June 2022)
- Yours Truly - is this what i look like? (EP) (15 July 2022)
- In Hearts Wake - Green Is The New Black (Soundtrack) (5 August 2022)
- Stray from the Path - Euthanasia (Album) (9 September 2022)
- Void of Vision - Chronicles III: Underworld (EP) (11 November 2022)
- Void of Vision - Chronicles (Album) (17 February 2023)
- Invent Animate - Heavener (Album) (17 March 2023)
