= Dream On Dreamer (band) =

Australian metalcore band

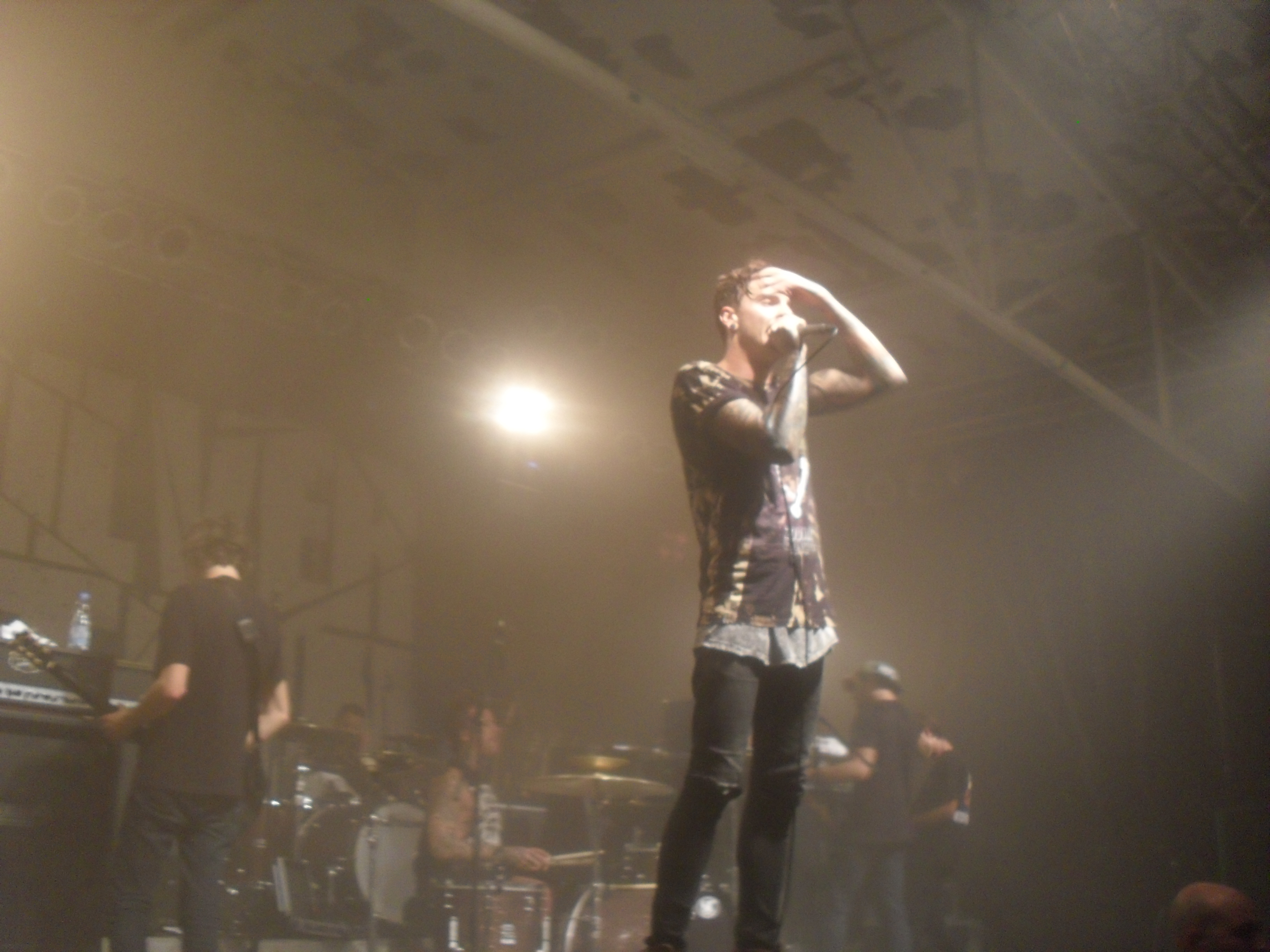
- Dream On Dreamer performing in 2013

Background information
- Origin: Melbourne, Australia
- Genres: Metalcore; alternative hardcore
- Years active: 2009–present
- Labels: We Are Unified (2009–2014); Triple Vision (2010–2014); Rise (2011–2013)
- Members: Marcel Gadacz; Callan Orr; Zach Britt; Chris Shaw
- Past members: Michael McLeod; Luke Domic; Daniel Jungwirth; Aaron Fiocca; Dylan Kuiper
- Website: dreamondreamerband.com

Dream On Dreamer is an Australian four-piece alternative metalcore band from Melbourne, Victoria, formed in 2009.

The band released two EPs and five albums. The first EP, Set Sail, Armada, was released on 3 July 2009. Almost a year later, Dream On Dreamer published their second EP, called Hope, on Boomtown and Triple Vision Records. After signing with Rise Records and UNFD, the band released their debut album, Heartbound, in August 2011. It reached the Australian Albums Charts and was nominated for a Best Hard Rock or Heavy Metal Aria award. Their second album, Loveless, followed in 2013. Their third, Songs of Soulitude, came out on 13 November 2015 as an independent release and peaked at number 26 on the Australian Albums Charts.

The band toured North America, Europe, Japan, and Australia several times and played at the Soundwave Festival in 2012 and 2014. They shared stages with the Color Morale, Pierce the Veil, Memphis May Fire, Deez Nuts, Avenged Sevenfold, Confide, A Day to Remember, and Silverstein, among others.

In February 2020, the band announced their upcoming split. In August 2023, however, they stated on their Instagram account that they would continue on a smaller scale.

== History ==
=== 2009–2010: Beginnings ===
Dream On Dreamer was formed in Melbourne, Victoria in 2009 by vocalist Marcel Gadacz, guitarist Callan Orr, drummer Aaron Fiocca, bassist and clean vocalist Michael McLeod, and keyboardist Daniel Jungwirth.

Dream On Dreamer released their debut EP, Set Sail, Armada, on 3 July 2009. Their second EP, Hope, came out almost a year later, via Boomtown Records. The band supported Pierce the Veil in Australia and New Zealand in September 2010.

=== 2011–2012: Heartbound ===
After signing with Rise Records and UNFD, Dream On Dreamer released their debut album, Heartbound, on 21 August 2011. It was produced by Cameron Mizell, who had previously worked with such acts as This Romantic Tragedy, Sleeping with Sirens, and A Skylit Drive. The album peaked at #38 on the Australian Albums Charts and was nominated for an ARIA Award for Best Hard Rock or Heavy Metal Album.

In July 2011, the band was invited to join Avenged Sevenfold's Welcome to the Family Tour in Australia, replacing Sevendust, who had cancelled several weeks before the tour start. In October 2011, the band toured with We Came as Romans and the Devil Wears Prada on the Dead Throne Australia Tour. In New Zealand, the groups toured with Saving Grace. The band also shared stages with Memphis May Fire and the Color Morale throughout Belgium, Germany, France, the UK, Austria, Italy, and the Netherlands.

In January and February 2012, Dream On Dreamer toured throughout the United States as support for Attack Attack!, Sleeping with Sirens, the Ghost Inside, and Chunk! No, Captain Chunk!. They then headed to Japan for the first time, with We Came As Romans and Crossfaith, and played the Scream Out Festival in Osaka in late February. In early March, the band played the Australian Soundwave Festival for the first time, performing two side-shows with Underoath. In August and September 2012, Dream On Dreamer embarked on their Homebound Tour, with In Hearts Wake, Like Moths to Flames, and Hand of Mercy as support acts.

Heartbound was re-released as a "tour edition", which included bonus songs and a documentary DVD. In November, McLeod announced he would be leaving at the end of the year due to having become a father. In November and December 2012, Dream On Dreamer were part of the Mayhem Tour. This was McLeod's last tour as their bassist and clean vocalist. The band shared the stage with In Fear and Faith, Make Them Suffer, and Saviour, after which Daniel Jungwirth replaced McLeod on bass.

=== 2013: Loveless ===
At the beginning of 2013, Zachary Britt of the Dream, the Chase joined Dream On Dreamer on rhythm guitar and clean vocals. In March and April of that year, the group played their second European tour as support for Abandon All Ships, No Bragging Rights, and For the Fallen Dreams. Their second album, titled Loveless, was released worldwide on 28 June 2013, via UNFD, peaking at #29 on the ARIA Albums Charts for one week. Between 12 and 18 July 2013, the band supported A Day to Remember and the Devil Wears Prada in Australia. In September, they performed in Japan for the second time. Drummer Aaron Fiocca was diagnosed with cancer, and the band had to play several gigs without him.

At the end of October 2013, Dream On Dreamer toured Australia on their Loveless Tour, with support from A Skylit Drive, No Bragging Rights, and Hellions. Alongside Palisades, they supported Silverstein during their European tour at the end of 2013.

=== 2014–2019: Songs of Soulitude, It Comes and Goes ===
In the middle of January 2014, Dream On Dreamer stated they were working on new songs for their third record, Songs of Soulitude, which was released in 2015. In February and March, they played the Soundwave Festival once more. In April 2014, the band announced their split with Daniel Jungwirth and shortly after, they replaced him with former House vs. Hurricane guitarist Chris Shaw.

Between 4 and 15 June 2014, the band toured Australia alongside Being as an Ocean as support for In Hearts Wake, during their Earthwalker Tour.

On 8 August 2014, Dream On Dreamer released a new song called "Darkness Brought Me Here". On 15 June 2015, the song "Don't Lose Your Heart" came out.

The band subsequently launched the It Comes and Goes tour, in support of their forthcoming album of the same name, which was released on 25 May 2018.

=== 2020–2022: What If I Told You It Doesn't Get Better, breakup ===
On 9 February 2020, Dream On Dreamer announced that they would be parting ways after eleven years together, citing the need to focus on their personal lives.

On 10 April 2020, they released their final album, What If I Told You It Doesn't Get Better. On 22 March 2020, they announced they would be postponing their farewell tour due to the COVID-19 pandemic.

=== 2023: reunion shows and future activity ===
On 12 June 2023, Dream On Dreamer announced several reunion shows on their Instagram account, to celebrate the ten-year anniversary of their sophomore album, Loveless.

In a 3 August 2023 Instagram post, the band stated that they want to continue on a smaller scale and that they are not ruling out playing shows or releasing new music.

== Musical style ==
British magazine Rock Sound described the band's debut album as "rooted in metalcore but packed with a heaving mass of ideas born out of the intricate arrangements, use of melody and electronics."

On their second album, Loveless, the band's sound was described as being more melodic than their previous work. One of the reasons explaining this change was that Daniel Jungwirth had changed instruments from keyboard to bass guitar, and electronic passages on the album were arranged with backtracking. In comparison with their debut record, Dream On Dreamer used less electronic samples on Loveless.

Vocalist Marcel Gadacz wrote all the lyrics to the band's songs.

== Band members ==
Current members

- Marcel Gadacz – unclean vocals (2008–present), clean vocals (2014–present), drums (2018–present)
- Callan Orr – lead guitar (2008–present), backing vocals (2013–present)
- Zachary Britt – rhythm guitar, clean vocals, piano, keyboards (2013–present)
- Chris Shaw – bass (2014–present)

Past members

- Michael "McCoy" McLeod – bass, clean vocals (2008–2012)
- Luke Domic – rhythm guitar (2008–2013)
- Daniel "Deej" Jungwirth – keyboards, synthesizers, piano, samples (2008–2013); bass (2012–2014)
- Aaron Fiocca – drums (2008–2015)
- Dylan Kuiper – drums (2015–2018)

Timeline

== Discography ==
=== Albums ===
Year	Details	Peak chart positions
Year	Details	AUS
2011	Heartbound: Release: 21 August 2011; Label: Rise, UNFD; Formats: CD, download	39
2013	Loveless: Release: 28 June 2013; Label: UNFD; Formats: CD, download	28
2015	Songs of Soulitude: Release: 13 November 2015; Label: Independent; Formats: CD, download	29
2018	It Comes and Goes: Release: 25 May 2018; Label: Independent; Formats: CD, download	34
2020	What If I Told You It Doesn't Get Better: Release: 10 April 2020; Label: Independent; Formats: CD, download	29
2026	Heavens: Release: 1 May 2026; Label: Independent; Formats: CD, download	

=== EPs ===
Year	EP details
2009	Sails Set, Armada: Released: 3 July 2009; Label: self-produced; Format: Music download
2010	Hope: Released: 4 July 2010; Label: Boomtown, Triple Vision; Format: CD, Music download

== Awards and nominations ==
=== ARIA Music Awards ===
The ARIA Music Awards are a set of annual ceremonies presented by the Australian Recording Industry Association (ARIA), which recognise excellence, innovation, and achievement across all genres of the music of Australia. They commenced in 1987.

Year	Nominee / work	Award	Result	Ref.
2011	Heartbound	Best Hard Rock or Heavy Metal Album	Nominated	

=== Music Victoria Awards ===
The Music Victoria Awards are an annual awards night celebrating Victorian music. They commenced in 2006.

Year	Nominee / work	Award	Result	Ref.
2018	It Comes and Goes	Best Heavy Album	Nominated	
