= Northlane discography =

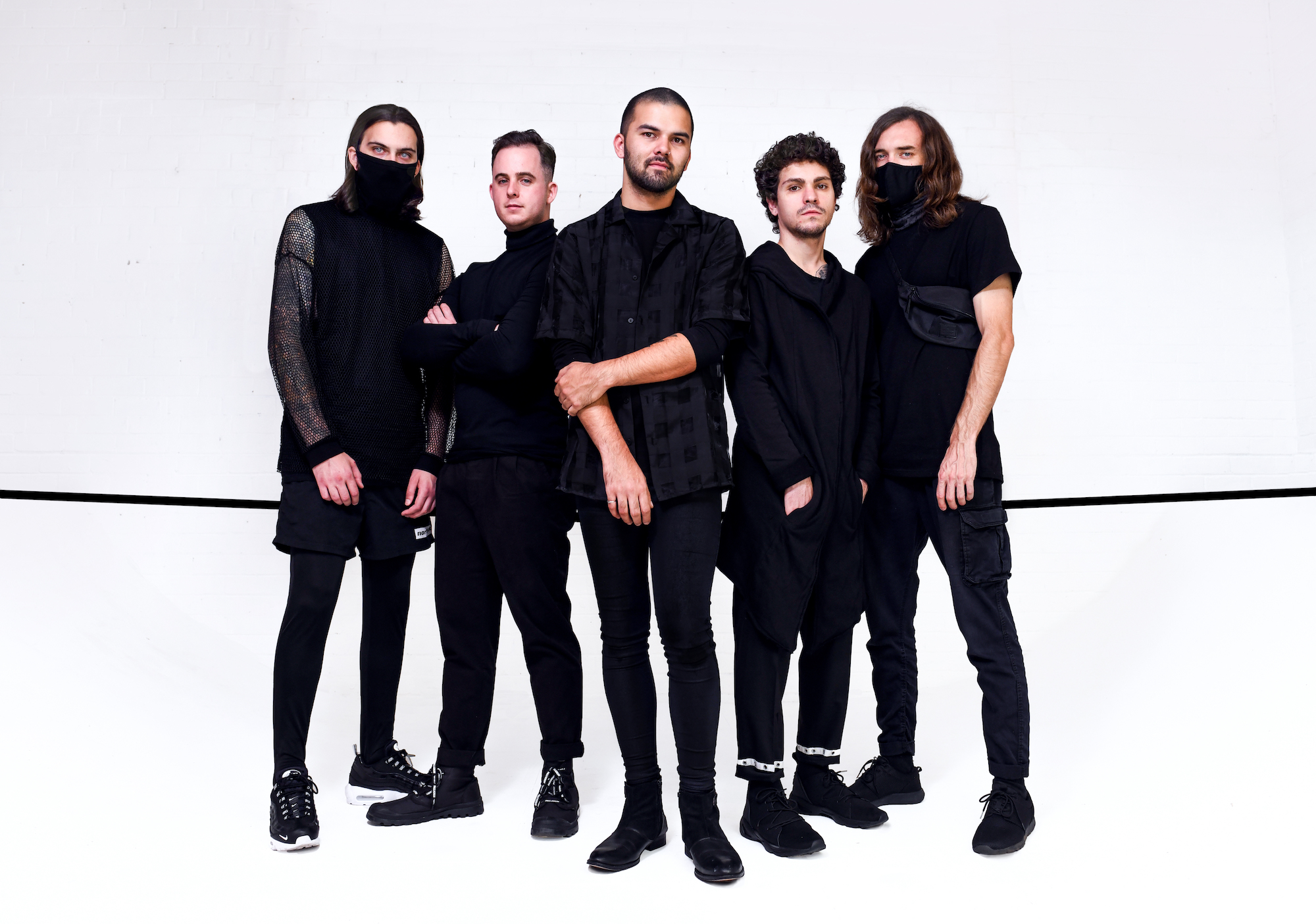
- Northlane in 2019
- Studio albums: 6
- EPs: 5
- Singles: 29
- Music videos: 24
- Live albums: 2

Australian heavy metal band Northlane has released six studio albums, five EPs, two live albums, twenty-nine singles, and twenty-four music videos.

== Albums ==
=== Studio albums ===
List of studio albums, with selected chart positions
Title	Album details	Peak chart positions			
Title	Album details	AUS	US	US Heat	UK
Discoveries	Released: 11 November 2011; Label: UNFD, Distort; Format: CD, digital download, streaming	85 (Note: Discoveries also peaked at number 5 on the Top 20 Vinyl Albums.)	—	—	—
Singularity	Released: 22 March 2013; Label: UNFD, Distort, Rise (North America); Format: CD, digital download, streaming	3 (Note: Discoveries also peaked at number 3 on the Top 20 Vinyl Albums.)	—	—	—
Node	Released: 24 July 2015; Label: UNFD, Distort, Rise (North America), New Damage; Format: CD, LP, cassette, digital download, streaming	1 (Note: Node also peaked at number 2 on the Top 20 Vinyl Albums.)	195	2	92
Mesmer	Released: 24 March 2017; Label: UNFD, Rise (North America); Format: CD, LP, cassette, digital download, streaming	3	—	11	—
Alien	Released: 2 August 2019; Label: UNFD; Format: CD, LP, cassette, digital download, streaming	3	—	6	—
Obsidian	Released: 22 April 2022; Label: Worldeater, Believe; Format: CD, LP, digital download, streaming	1	—	—	—
Anemoia	Scheduled: 27 November 2026; Label: Immortal Music Group, Believe; Format: CD, LP, digital download, streaming	To be released			
"—" denotes a recording that did not chart.

=== Live albums ===
List of live albums
Title	Album details
Analog Future	Released: 16 March 2018; Label: UNFD (UNFD109); Format: LP, digital download, streaming
Live at the Roundhouse	Released: 28 August 2020; Label: UNFD (UNFD143); Format: digital download, streaming; Tracklisting: 1. Talking Heads (Live); 2. Intuition (Live); 3. Details Matter (Live); 4. Jinn (Live); 5. Rot (Live); 6. Citizen (Live); 7. 4D (Live); 8. Freefall (Live); 9. Obelisk (Live); 10. Vultures (Live); 11. Eclipse (Live); 12. Bloodline (Live); 13. Sleepless (Live); 14. Quantum Flux (Live)

== Extended plays ==
List of extended plays, with selected chart positions
Title	EP details	Peak chart positions
Title	EP details	AUS
Hollow Existence	Released: 17 January 2010; Label: Self-released (NL001); Format: CD-R, digital download; Tracklisting: 1. Hollow; 2. Keymaker; 3. Set in Stone; 4. All Seeing Eye; 5. Metamorphosis; 6. The Deadmines	—
Equinox (with In Hearts Wake)	Released: 20 April 2016; Label: UNFD (UNFD068); Format: digital, streaming, LP	75
5G	Released: 26 February 2021; Label: UNFD (UNFD143-A); Format: digital, LP; Tracklisting: 1. Bloodline (HEALTH remix); 2. 4D (Mashd N Kutcher remix); 3. Vultures (Mr. Bill remix); 4. Ohm (Northlane remix); 5. Sleepless (PhaseOne remix)	—
2D	Released: 21 May 2021; Label: UNFD (UNFD143-B); Format: digital, LP; Tracklisting: 1. Bloodline (Acoustic); 2. Rift (Acoustic); 3. 4D (Acoustic); 4. Enemy of the Night (Acoustic); 5. Sleepless (Acoustic)	—
Mirror's Edge	Released: 12 April 2024; Label: Worldeater, Believe (NL07EP); Format: EP, digital, LP (RSD 2024 exclusive); Tracklisting: 1. Mirror’s Edge; 2. Afterimage (feat. Ian Kenny of Karnivool); 3. Miasma (feat. Winston McCall of Parkway Drive); 4. Let Me Disappear; 5. Kraft (feat. Brendon Padjasek of Structures, ex-Northlane); 6. Dante	— (Note: Mirror's Edge did not enter the ARIA Top 100 Album Chart, but peaked at number 6 on the Australian Artist Chart and at number 10 on the Australian Vinyl Album Chart in the week following Record Store Day 2024.)
"—" denotes a recording that did not chart.

== Singles ==
Title	Year	Peak chart positions	Album
Title	Year	AUS	Album
"Worldeater"	2012	—	Singularity
"Quantum Flux"	2013	82	Singularity
"Masquerade" (featuring Drew York)	2013	—	Singularity
"Rot"	2014	94	Node
"Obelisk"	2015	—	Node
"Impulse"	2015	—	Node
"Weightless"	2016	—	Node
"Intuition"	2017	—	Mesmer
"Mesmer"	2017	—	Mesmer
"Citizen"	2017	—	Mesmer
"Vultures"	2018	—	Alien
"Bloodline"	2019	—	Alien
"Talking Heads"	2019	—	Alien
"Eclipse"	2019	—	Alien
"Get Free" (The Vines cover)	2019	—	Non-album single
"Enemy of the Night"	2020	—	Alien
"Clockwork"	2021	—	Obsidian
"Echo Chamber"	2021	—	Obsidian
"Plenty"	2022	—	Obsidian
"Carbonized"	2022	—	Obsidian
"Dante"	2023	—	Mirror's Edge
"Miasma" (featuring Winston McCall)	2024	—	Mirror's Edge
"Afterimage" (featuring Ian Kenny)	2024	—	Mirror's Edge
"Let Me Disappear"	2024	—	Mirror's Edge
"Welcome to the Industry"	2024	×	Fretless - The Wrath of Riffson Original Game Soundtrack
"Evian"	2026	—	Anemoia
"Cut_It"	2026	—	Anemoia
"Crucified"	2026	—	Anemoia
"Deathwish"	2026	—	Anemoia

As featured artist

Title	Year	Album
"Crash & Burn" (PhaseOne featuring Northlane)	2019	Transcendency
"Bathed in Solitude" (Termina featuring Marcus Bridge)	2023	Soul Elegy

Album appearances

List of album appearances
Title	Year	Album
"Anthem for the Year 2000" (Silverchair cover)	2017	Spawn (Again): A Tribute to Silverchair
"Eat, Sleep, Rave, Repeat" (Fatboy Slim cover)	2018	Fatboy Slim vs. Australia

== Music videos ==
Year	Song	Album	Director
2012	"Dispossession"	Discoveries	Chris Elder
2012	"Transcending Dimensions"	Discoveries	Tim Allen
2013	"Quantum Flux"	Singularity	Unknown
2013	"Dream Awake"	Singularity	Unknown
2013	"Masquerade"	Singularity	Christopher McColm
2014	"Rot"	Node	Jason Eshraghian
2015	"Obelisk"	Node	Jason Eshraghian
2015	"Impulse"	Node	Jason Eshraghian
2016	"Equinox"	Equinox (EP)	Jason Eshraghian
2017	"Intuition"	Mesmer	Jason Eshraghian
2017	"Citizen"	Mesmer	Jason Eshraghian
2017	"Solar"	Mesmer	Jason Eshraghian
2017	"Colourwave"	Mesmer	Jason Eshraghian
2018	"Heartmachine"	Mesmer	Jason Eshraghian
2018	"Vultures"	Alien	Fvckrender
2019	"Bloodline"	Alien	Jason Eshraghian
2019	"Eclipse"	Alien	Jason Eshraghian
2019	"4D"	Alien	Neal Walters
2021	"Clockwork"	Obsidian	Jason Eshraghian
2021	"Echo Chamber"	Obsidian	Jason Eshraghian
2022	"Carbonized"	Obsidian	Third Eye Visuals
2023	"Dante"	Mirror's Edge (EP)	Ed Reiss
2026	"Evain"	Anemoia	
2026	"Cut_It"	Anemoia	
