= Ark (In Hearts Wake album) =

2017 album by In Hearts Wake

Studio album by In Hearts Wake
- Released: 26 May 2017
- Recorded: 2017
- Genre: Metalcore
- Length: 44:04
- Label: UNFD; Rise
- Producer: Will Putney

In Hearts Wake chronology
Equinox (2016)	Ark (2017)	Kaliyuga (2020)

Singles from Ark
- 1. "Warcry" Released: 2 April 2017; 2. "Passage" Released: 25 April 2017; 3. "Frequency" Released: 11 October 2017

Deluxe edition album cover
- Artwork used for the deluxe edition album cover.

Ark is the fourth studio album by Australian metalcore band In Hearts Wake. It was released on 26 May 2017 through UNFD and Rise Records. It was produced by Will Putney.

In June 2018, a deluxe edition of Ark was released featuring reimagined versions of some tracks and also instrumentals of all tracks.

== Background and promotion ==
The band released the single "Warcry", on 2 April 2017 alongside a lyric video. The second single of the album "Passage" was released on 25 April, alongside an accompanying music video. On 11 October, their third single "Frequency" was released, alongside an accompanying music video containing footage from their Ark tour.

Coinciding with the release of Ark, In Hearts Wake joined forces with Tangaroa Blue for 'We Are Waterborne: An In Hearts Wake Initiative' leading a series of waterway clean-ups in Melbourne, Sydney, Brisbane and in their hometown of Byron Bay. People who participated received a free 'We Are Waterborne Volunteer' t-shirt.

In Hearts Wake went on a 5-date tour in July to promote Ark, with supporting acts; While She Sleeps, Crossfaith, and Polaris. After the release of the deluxe edition of Ark, the band went on a 3-date all ages tour to promote it in June. Supporting them were Justice for the Damned, Thornhill, and The Beautiful Monument.

== Writing and composition ==
Jake Taylor on describing the album and said:

The central concept of Ark is that the Earth is essentially a ship where every living creature – every animal, man, woman and child – was born. Providing shelter, it has sustained and nurtured us with everything we've ever needed. If one part of the ship is compromised, all life is threatened. If we don't work together to repair our home and restore its integrity, we will all go down with the ship.

— Jake Taylor,

The album's genre has been described as metalcore.

== Critical reception ==
Professional ratings
Review scores
Source	Rating
Already Heard	4/5 stars
Dead Press!	7/10
Ghost Cult	8/10
Heavy	3.75/5
KillYourStereo	30/100
Louder Sound	3.5/5 stars
Rock Sound	6/10
Wall of Sound	5/10

The album received mixed reviews from critics. Already Heard rated the album 4 out of 5 and said: "Beautiful, intricate and at times heavier than hell, In Hearts Wake have hit a new peak with Ark. With every release, their message of sustainability and tolerance gets more and more compelling, raw and hard hitting, which is exactly what the band want. It feels as though the sky is the limit and In Hearts Wake have just earned their wings." Zach Redrup from Dead Press! rated the album positively and saying: "The tone of the record is superb, the band are tackling their views without being overly preachy about it, and through metaphors, deliver their point rather well. The instrumentation of the record is brilliantly mastered; the production on the record only amplifies this, and solidifies a sound that proves In Hearts Wake have now honed their craft." Chris Tippell from Ghost Cult gave the album an 8-out-of-10 and said: "Not quite unseating others from their throne, In Hearts Wake have still shown that they are not to be overlooked, and in future they should be definitely included in the same bracket as many of their widely hailed peers." Heavy magazine in a positive review said: "its variation into other avenues that their musical counterparts have embraced does not entirely fit with [In Hearts Wake]'s character when the band ignites their impact is felt like a flood from an uncontrollable tidal surge."

KillYourStereo gave it a negative review saying: "I don't care for this record, and neither should you. Why? Because this album already exists. It's called Divination. It's called Earthwalker. It's called Skydancer. So save your cash-monies and save the ever-dissipating currency that is your time." In a modest review, Sophie Maughan from Louder Sound said: "[In Hearts Wake] aren't afraid to deviate from the musical blueprint they've consolidated across three albums." Rock Sound gave it 6 out of 10 and said: "Sweeping in after their interconnected Earthwalker and Skydancer records, Ark is a full-on concept release, exploring the many ways that water unites, divides and defines us. [...] Still, even if the medium sometimes fails them, the band's message should prove hard to shake." Wall of Sound gave the album an average review saying: "Ark, with its powerful first half that draws your attention to the band and the direction they could be heading, sadly drops the ball with the final act despite a few bangers that at times felt somewhat out of place surrounded by their neighbouring songs around them."

== Track listing ==
Adapted from Spotify.

All tracks are written by Ben Nairne, Eaven Dall, Jake Taylor, Kyle Erich, and Will Putney, except where noted.

No.	Title	Writer(s)	Length
1.	"Ark"	Ben Nairne, Jake Taylor	1:10
2.	"Passage"		3:18
3.	"Nomad"		4:14
4.	"Frequency"		3:59
5.	"Warcry"	Nairne, Eaven Dall, Taylor, Kyle Erich	3:56
6.	"Waterborne"		3:56
7.	"Arrow"		4:47
8.	"Flow"	Nairne, Dall, Taylor, Erich	3:40
9.	"Overthrow"	Nairne, Dall, Taylor, Erich	4:03
10.	"Elemental"		3:38
11.	"Totality"	Nairne, Dall, Taylor, Erich	3:56
12.	"Now"		3:22
Total length:			44:04

Deluxe Edition bonus tracks [DISC ONE]
No.	Title	Length
13.	"Arrow" (featuring CJ Gilpin of Dream State)	4:47
14.	"Frequency" (reimagined)	3:59
15.	"Waterborne" (reimagined)	3:53
16.	"Adrift" (outro)	3:18
17.	"Elemental" (featuring CJ McMahon of Thy Art Is Murder)	3:43
Total length:		63:44

Deluxe Edition bonus tracks [DISC TWO]
No.	Title	Length
1.	"Ark" (instrumental)	1:10
2.	"Passage" (instrumental)	3:18
3.	"Nomad" (instrumental)	4:14
4.	"Frequency" (instrumental)	3:59
5.	"Warcry" (instrumental)	3:56
6.	"Waterborne" (instrumental)	3:56
7.	"Arrow" (instrumental)	4:47
8.	"Flow" (instrumental)	3:40
9.	"Overthrow" (instrumental)	4:03
10.	"Elemental" (instrumental)	3:38
11.	"Totality" (instrumental)	3:56
12.	"Now" (instrumental)	3:22
Total length:		44:04

== Personnel ==
Credits adapted from AllMusic and Discogs.

In Hearts Wake

- Jake Taylor – lead vocals, liner notes
- Eaven Dall – lead guitar, backing vocals
- Ben Nairne – rhythm guitar
- Kyle Erich – bass, clean vocals
- Conor Ward – drums

Additional musicians

- CJ Gilpin of Dream State – guest vocals on track 13
- CJ McMahon of Thy Art Is Murder – guest vocals on track 17
- Randy Laboeuf – drums, guitars, vocal tracking

Additional personnel

- Will Putney – production, engineering, mixing, mastering, recording, vocal tracking, drums, guitars
- Randy Reimann – engineering
- Clinton Bradley – additional production
- Michelle Taylor – editing, liner notes
- Milan Chagoury – artwork, illustrations
- Patrick Galvin – cover art
- Pat Fox – layout

== Charts ==
Chart (2017)	Peak position
Australian Albums (ARIA)	3
