= Alien (Northlane album) =

2019 album by Northlane

Studio album by Northlane
- Released: 2 August 2019
- Studios: Chris Blancato's Studio, Sydney, New South Wales, Australia; Electric Sun Studios, Arndell Park, New South Wales
- Genres: Nu metal; metalcore; alternative metal; industrial metal
- Length: 43:22
- Label: UNFD
- Producer: Northlane

Northlane chronology
| Analog Future (2018) | Alien (2019) | Obsidian (2022) |

Singles from Alien
- 1. "Vultures" Released: 13 July 2018; 2. "Bloodline" Released: 30 April 2019; 3. "Talking Heads" Released: 5 June 2019; 4. "Eclipse" Released: 29 July 2019; 5. "Enemy of the Night" Released: 20 May 2020

Deluxe edition cover
- Artwork used for the deluxe edition cover.

Alien (stylised as A1IEN) is the fifth studio album by Australian heavy metal band Northlane. It was released on 2 August 2019 through UNFD. It was self-produced by the band themselves and recorded at Chris Blancato's Studio in Sydney, although Marcus Bridge's vocals were recorded at Electric Sun Studios in Arndell Park. The album's second single, "Bloodline", shows the group's continuity of slight departure from their metalcore roots and towards a more alternative and experimental sound, as established on their previous releases, Node and Mesmer. It also marks the group's first shift into different genres, as they blended into the album elements of nu metal, industrial metal and EDM. This is the last album to feature their founding bassist Alex Milovic, who only appeared on the track "Vultures".

At the ARIA Music Awards of 2019, the album won the award for Best Hard Rock or Heavy Metal Album, making Alien their third ARIA-award winning album.

At the J Awards of 2019, the album was nominated for Australian Album of the Year.

At the AIR Awards of 2020, the album won Best Independent Heavy Album or EP.

In 2020, a deluxe edition of Alien was released, which contains a bonus track "Enemy of the Night" and instrumental versions of all songs. A double LP neon pink vinyl was released, limited to unknown amount of physical copies worldwide, and it was later made available digitally for streaming and download.

== Background and promotion ==
On 5 July 2018, it was discovered that hidden on the bands poster for their Summer Europe 2018 tour was a date set for 13 July 2018 along with the word "Vultures". Later on that date the band dropped their new song entitled "Vultures" which was first released as a standalone song along with an accompanying music video.

On 9 February 2019, Northlane tweeted a video with small text reading "Rift" in it, teasing one of the tracks on the album. On 12 April, the band released a leak of the album, showing its title, release date, artwork and tracklist. A few days later, the band released another leak, suggesting that they are planning to release three more singles: "Bloodline", "Talking Heads" and "Eclipse". On 30 April, the band released their second single "Bloodline" alongside an accompanying music video. A world tour was also announced on the back of their new album Alien. On 3 June, the band announced that their third single "Talking Heads" will be released much earlier than the assumed release date. The band had previously played the single at past festivals. A few days later, the label released a teaser of the single with an official release date on 5 June. Along with the release of the single, the band announced a new show for their National Tour for Melbourne after the first one completely sold out. VIP tickets were also announced, where fans could upgrade their standard tickets for VIP ones. On 29 July, the band released their fourth single "Eclipse", which was originally scheduled for release much more earlier than the current release date. The single was released along with an accompanying music video.

On 20 May 2020, the band released a new single titled "Enemy of the Night" and also announced that the deluxe edition of Alien is set for release on 31 July 2020, which contains the bonus track "Enemy of the Night" and instrumental versions of all songs. A double LP neon pink vinyl will be released, limited to unknown amount of physical copies worldwide, and it will be later made available digitally for streaming and download.

== Writing and composition ==
The band stated that Alien is their most personal to date. The opening track, "Details Matter" is a statement of the trials at hand, telling the story of a protagonist that other people would feel happier if they suffered. "Bloodline" is based upon frontman Marcus Bridge's violent upbringing living with drug-addicted parents. The track "4D" is a lyrical quest to have others feel understood and to not feel alone, the track also incorporates a synth melody delving into the EDM genre slightly. "Talking Heads" details an attempted break-out of an internal cage. The track "Freefall" recounts the time from frontman Marcus Bridge's childhood when a man broke into a King's Cross motel that Bridge and his family were staying at and pointed a gun at his father. The track "Jinn" was described as sounding similar to the band's prior releases and as being "a turning point moment; of breaking through barriers, of refusing generational pain." The end of "Jinn" blends into the next track "Eclipse" which retells "Bloodline" from Bridge's father's point of view and as Bridge describes "is an attempt to understand the reasons and motivations behind the things my father did." Thematically, the next track "Rift" muses about the impending mortality of everyone and how death is an inevitable part of life, it also contains more elements of the EDM genre. The track "Paradigm" described how Bridge moved past all the abuse of his childhood and rose to be on top. The first single released, "Vultures", shuts down die-hard fans who long for the band's old sound. The closing track "Sleepless" depicts Bridge's mother's inability preventing his sister from turning to drugs of her own.

Guitarist and songwriter Jon Deiley said: "[I ripped] a page out of the rulebook and [made] this disgusting amalgamation of sounds that should maybe never have been merged together in the first place. And I think that is the sound of the frustration within me." The frustration of Deiley's came from what he called "people turning their backs on us". Expressing that several issues including former bassist Alex Milovic leaving halfway into the writing of the album culminated in a lot of stress.

== Critical reception ==
Professional ratings
Review scores
| Source | Rating |
|---|---|
| Already Heard | 4/5 stars |
| Depth | 10/10 |
| Distorted Sound | 9/10 |
| Exclaim! | 8/10 |
| Heavy | Positive |
| Kerrang! | 3/5 stars |
| KillYourStereo | 95/100 |
| Wall of Sound | 10/10 |

The album received critical acclaim from critics. Already Heard rated the album 4 out of 5 and: "Northlane have given birth to the vicious evolving creature they have always promised. Alien drags their sound kicking and screaming into a new era. Purists will hate it, but you knew this monster was growing inside them waiting to burst out." Kel Burch from Depth magazine, rated the album positively calling it: "A fresh leap forward for Northlane that's innovative, meaningful, and beautiful." Distorted Sound scored the album 9 out of 10 and said: "NORTHLANE can boast that their risk has paid off. Alien might be a huge leap, but stands as evidence that the Aussies are still only just getting started on their road to world domination." Lukas Wojcicki of Exclaim! gave it 8 out of 10 and said: "While Alien is sure to piss off purists who will inevitably complain about it sounding too digital and over-produced, it's certainly a refreshing addition to metal's current landscape, and, at the very least, an interesting exploration of the genre, its limits and its potential." Heavy magazine gave a positive review: "Alien is proof that when it comes to making a brilliant album it is music that means something to the band that is the most important ingredient."

Kerrang! gave the album 3 out of 5 and stated: "Whether it's the Northlane album you might have expected or hoped for, there's no denying that they have created something unique, creative, and with no small amount of integrity. And, you sense, they'll relish the mix of reactions." Alex Sievers from KillYourStereo gave the album 95 out of 100 and said: "There's honestly nothing I'd alter about this record, big or small. Alien is a near-perfect album. Northlane could not make Alien if they hadn't made Discoveries and Singularity beforehand; they couldn't do this if they hadn't done Node and Mesmer afterwards. Yet this is the change they needed. This is an album finely crafted after years doing what they do; years of touring, writing, listening, and experiencing. It's a culmination of so much, and in a way, this is their make-or-break moment, but they sure haven't broken in terms of song-writing and performances. If anything, this is their greatest release." Wall of Sound gave the album a perfect score 10/10 and saying: "Northlane have absolutely upped the ante with Alien, showing a side and style they haven't touched on yet, but have absolutely nailed in the process. This is how you progress musically, bringing in new elements along the way, yet still remaining close to the original source material. This is more than just an album, this is something that is enjoyable from start to finish with each song rolling into each other, taking the listener on a journey through the depths of hell and the shining light on the other side. I don't use the word masterpiece very often, but this is a fucking masterpiece."

== Track listing ==
Adapted from iTunes.

| No. | Title | Length |
|---|---|---|
| 1. | "Details Matter" | 4:05 |
| 2. | "Bloodline" | 3:25 |
| 3. | "4D" | 4:11 |
| 4. | "Talking Heads" | 3:50 |
| 5. | "Freefall" | 4:02 |
| 6. | "Jinn" | 4:01 |
| 7. | "Eclipse" | 4:02 |
| 8. | "Rift" | 3:59 |
| 9. | "Paradigm" | 3:23 |
| 10. | "Vultures" | 3:47 |
| 11. | "Sleepless" | 4:37 |
| Total length: | | 43:22 |

Deluxe edition bonus tracks
| No. | Title | Length |
|---|---|---|
| 1. | "Enemy of the Night" | 3:41 |
| 2. | "Details Matter" (instrumental) | 4:05 |
| 3. | "Bloodline" (instrumental) | 3:25 |
| 4. | "4D" (instrumental) | 4:11 |
| 5. | "Talking Heads" (instrumental) | 3:50 |
| 6. | "Freefall" (instrumental) | 4:02 |
| 7. | "Jinn" (instrumental) | 4:01 |
| 8. | "Eclipse" (instrumental) | 4:02 |
| 9. | "Rift" (instrumental) | 3:59 |
| 10. | "Paradigm" (instrumental) | 3:23 |
| 11. | "Vultures" (instrumental) | 3:47 |
| 12. | "Sleepless" (instrumental) | 4:37 |
| 13. | "Enemy of the Night" (instrumental) | 3:41 |
| Total length: | | 50:44 |

== Personnel ==
Credits adapted from AllMusic and album sleeve.

Northlane

- Marcus Bridge – lead vocals
- Jon Deiley – guitars, programming, drum pad
- Josh Smith – guitars
- Nic Pettersen – drums, percussion
- Brendon Padjasek – bass, backing vocals
- Alex Milovic – bass ("Vultures")

Additional personnel

- Northlane – production
- Drew Fulk – co-production ("Vultures")
- Jonathan Burgan – additional production ("Talking Heads")
- Chris Blancato – engineering, instrumental production ("Enemy of the Night")
- Dave Petrovic – vocal engineering, vocal production ("Enemy of the Night")
- Adam "Nolly" Getgood – mixing
- Ermin Hamidovic – mastering
- Darren Oorloff – artwork
- Davy Evans – photography

== Charts ==
Chart performance for Alien
| Chart (2019) | Peak position |
|---|---|
| Australian Albums (ARIA) | 3 |
| Swiss Albums (Schweizer Hitparade) | 72 |
| UK Album Sales (OCC) | 71 |
| UK Digital Albums (OCC) | 38 |
| UK Independent Albums (OCC) | 19 |
| UK Rock & Metal Albums (OCC) | 6 |
| US Heatseekers Albums (Billboard) | 6 |
