= Analog Future =

2017 album by Northlane

Live album by Northlane
- Released: 16 March 2018
- Recorded: August–December 2017
- Venue: 170 Russell, Melbourne, Australia; Max Watts, Brisbane, Australia; Enmore Theatre, Sydney, Australia; Electric Ballroom, London, UK; Academy 2, Manchester, UK; Uniclub, Buenos Aires, Argentina; Essigfabrik, Cologne, Germany; Petit Bain, Paris, France; The Garage, Glasgow, UK
- Genre: Metalcore; progressive metal; alternative metal
- Length: 41:45
- Label: UNFD

Northlane chronology
| Mesmer (2017) | Analog Future (2018) | Alien (2019) |

Singles from Analog Future
- 1. "Citizen (Live in Melbourne)" Released: 6 February 2018

Analog Future (stylised as ANALOG_FUTURE) is the first live album by Australian heavy metal band Northlane. It was released on 16 March 2018 through UNFD. It was recorded between August–December 2017, during their Mesmer World Tour.

The album had a limited edition vinyl release of only 500 copies.

== Background and promotion ==
The first and only single from the live album, "Citizen (Live in Melbourne)", was recorded on 20 October 2017 and released on 6 February 2018.

On 13 February, Northlane announced the track listing of the album.

About the album, the band said: "Since Northlane was born, we have never been able to capture the rawness, energy and sound of our live show in a recording, until now." Coinciding with the live album's release, Northlane returned to their hometown for an all-ages headline show at UNSW Roundhouse in Sydney. Justice for the Damned, Resist the Thought and DVSR played as support acts. The guitarist Josh Smith said that the Sydney show would be the band's last Australian appearance for the foreseeable future. Afterwards, apart from some festival appearances, the band took a break from touring all together until August the following year to promote their fifth studio album, Alien.

== Track listing ==
Track listing adapted from Spotify.

All tracks are written by Jon Deiley and Josh Smith, except where noted

| No. | Title | Writer(s) | Album | Length |
|---|---|---|---|---|
| 1. | "Colourwave" (Live in Melbourne, Australia) | | Mesmer | 3:54 |
| 2. | "Worldeater" (Live in Brisbane, Australia) | | Singularity | 3:48 |
| 3. | "Citizen" (Live in Melbourne, Australia) | David Bendeth, Jon Deiley, Josh Smith | Mesmer | 4:21 |
| 4. | "Dream Awake" (Live in Sydney, Australia) | | Singularity | 4:27 |
| 5. | "Rot" (Live in London, UK) | | Node | 4:09 |
| 6. | "Quantum Flux" (Live in Manchester, UK) | | Singularity | 4:07 |
| 7. | "Dispossession" (Live in Buenos Aires, Argentina) | | Discoveries | 3:44 |
| 8. | "Intuition" (Live in Cologne, Germany) | Bendeth, Deiley, Smith | Mesmer | 4:01 |
| 9. | "Obelisk" (Live in Paris, France) | | Node | 4:48 |
| 10. | "Paragon" (Live in Glasgow, Scotland) | | Mesmer | 4:26 |
| Total length: | | | | 41:45 |

== Personnel ==
Northlane

- Marcus Bridge – lead vocals
- Jon Deiley – guitars, programming, drum pad
- Josh Smith – guitars
- Alex Milovic – bass
- Nic Pettersen – drums, percussion

Additional personnel

- Jared Daly – mixing
- Chris Blancato – mastering
- GZ Media – vinyl pressing
