= Mesmer (album) =

Studio album by Northlane
- Released: 24 March 2017
- Studio: The Barber Shop Studio, Hopatcong, New Jersey, U.S.
- Genre: Metalcore; progressive metal; alternative metal
- Length: 43:39
- Label: UNFD; Rise
- Producer: David Bendeth

Northlane chronology
Equinox (2016)	Mesmer (2017)	Analog Future (2018)

Singles from Mesmer
- 1. "Intuition" Released: 18 January 2017; 2. "Citizen" Released: 20 March 2017

Deluxe edition cover
- Artwork used for the deluxe edition cover.

Mesmer is the fourth studio album by Australian heavy metal band Northlane. It was released on 24 March 2017 through UNFD, with no announcement prior to the release. It was produced by David Bendeth and recorded at The Barber Shop Studio in Hopatcong. It follows the group's slight departure from their metalcore roots and towards a more alternative and experimental sound, as established on their previous release, Node. It peaked at No. 3 on the ARIA Albums Chart. It is the last Northlane album to feature their founding bassist Alex Milovic as a member of the band.

In 2019, a deluxe edition of Mesmer was released, which contains instrumental versions of all songs. A double LP vinyl was released, limited to only 450 physical copies worldwide, it was later made available digitally for streaming and download.

== Release and promotion ==
The band premiered a new track "Intuition" at Unify Gathering in January 2017, which was eventually released on 17 January 2017. Northlane announced an Australian tour in support of the single in March 2017.

On 10 March, Northlane released the single "Mesmer", an ambient electronic track with an accompanying music video which was shot by Jason Eshraghian in Sydney and contains artistic shots of the band and scenic views. Along with this, a chatbot appeared on Northlane's Facebook page: called "Citizen", people could interact with the chatbot on Facebook Messenger where the bot would give cryptic messages and clues to upcoming releases.

On 16 March, all of Northlane's social media profile pictures turned white, and led fans to an easter egg website, nl6633.com via small text in the white images. This website contained a landing page which showed timelapsed videos of members of Northlane in a recording studio, however no additional information was given.

Two months after "Intuition" was released, another single, titled "Citizen", was released, on 20 March. On 24 March, the album was released without any prior warning, and the album was made available for immediate purchase and streaming. The aforementioned single "Mesmer" was discovered to be an album sampler/trailer, containing stems to all of the tracks on the album.

In the following months Northlane performed the Mesmer World Tour to promote the album. In July, Northlane announced a five date national tour for the Australian leg of their world tour, performing in all major cities. American metalcore bands Erra and Sworn In joined them for the tour as supporting acts.

== Writing and composition ==
Many of the songs portray emotional themes. "Heartmachine" tells of relationship loss, "Fade" portrays grieving emotions after the loss of family member, while the track "Veridian" contains euthanasia-endorsing lyrics. "Zero-One" implores listeners to follow what they love. The song "Paragon" was written in tribute of Architects guitarist Tom Searle, who died of skin cancer in 2016.

== Critical reception ==
Professional ratings
Review scores
Source	Rating
Dead Press!	7/10
Distorted Sound	8/10
Exclaim!	7/10
Heavy	4/5 stars
KillYourStereo	75/100
Loud	85/100
Rolling Stone	4/5 stars
Wall of Sound	9/10

The album received mostly positive reviews from critics, who praised the songwriting and performances of the band members. Zach Redrup of Dead Press! gave the album 7 out of 10, saying: "In essence, Northlane have produced a well rounded effort with Mesmer, and have kept things fresh for an audience that is offered a plethora of metalcore bands that often sound far too similar. In a few too many parts, Northlane themselves succumb to echoing bands and records before them, but the lyrical content is real, gritty, and genuine, and, paired with their musical innovation, they prove that they're ones to keep building with each release." Distorted Sound scored the album 8 out of 10 and stated: "Overall, Mesmer is a strong follow-up to 2015's Node, building on its theme and tone, with high-points being provided by Marcus Bridge's soaring vocals and the groovy, technical basslines of Alex Milovic. Unmissable for fans of the band and genre." Exclaim! gave it 7 out of 10 and said: "In general, Mesmer is an evolution for Northlane that greatly improves on their melodic and progressive aspects." In a very positive review, Heavy magazine wrote: "Mesmer is as surprising a listen as it was a surprise release, nothing short of a modern metalcore masterpiece that brings a new face to a mask that could only be worn by a band such as Northlane." Alex Sievers, from KillYourStereo gave the album a 75/100, and said: "It was better than Node but fell short when compared to their previous two albums, Discoveries and Singularity." Dan Southall of Loud magazine claimed about the album: "Mesmer can at times be repetitive, but it also sounds like a band that is growing away from their roots towards hereto unexplored musical territory for them. At its root, this is the album where another world beating Aussie band is firmly planting its marker." Jaymz Clements, in a four-star review for Rolling Stone, said: "On Mesmer Northlane offer a graphic meta-personal narrative couched in relentless machine-precise heaviness. [...] Few bands combine razor-sharp proficiency with spine-shaking heaviness and a generalised, amorphous disaffection the way Northlane do, infusing darkness, despair and (eventual) hope into an exultant musical catharsis. And four albums in, Australia's leading metalcore lights are only getting better at it." Wall of Sound rated the album 9 out of 10 and said: "So close to perfection, this collection of 11 new songs could actually turn out to be one of the best albums of 2017 so far with so many elements that put it as a front runner to be "Album of the Year" material. I'm so glad Northlane delivered the goods, the hype was certainly upheld and worth the wait. Marcus Bridge, take a bow you're the new OG of this band and you should all be proud of what you've produced. Exceptional listening for fans new and old."

== Track listing ==
All tracks are written by Marcus Bridge, Jon Deiley, Josh Smith, Alex Milovic and Nic Pettersen, except where noted

No.	Title	Writer(s)	Length
1.	"Citizen"	Bridge, Deiley, Smith, Milovic, Pettersen, David Bendeth	4:24
2.	"Colourwave"		3:41
3.	"Savage"		4:39
4.	"Solar"		3:16
5.	"Heartmachine"	Bridge, Deiley, Milovic, Pettersen, Bendeth	4:04
6.	"Intuition"	Bridge, Deiley, Smith, Milovic, Pettersen, Bendeth	3:51
7.	"Zero-One"		3:57
8.	"Fade"	Bridge, Deiley, Smith, Milovic, Pettersen, Bendeth	3:58
9.	"Render"		3:56
10.	"Veridian"		3:25
11.	"Paragon"	Bridge, Deiley, Smith, Milovic	4:23
Total length:			43:39

Deluxe edition bonus tracks
No.	Title	Length
1.	"Citizen" (instrumental)	4:24
2.	"Colourwave" (instrumental)	3:41
3.	"Savage" (instrumental)	4:39
4.	"Solar" (instrumental)	3:16
5.	"Heartmachine" (instrumental)	4:04
6.	"Intuition" (instrumental)	3:51
7.	"Zero-One" (instrumental)	3:57
8.	"Fade" (instrumental)	3:58
9.	"Render" (instrumental)	3:56
10.	"Veridian" (instrumental)	3:25
11.	"Paragon" (instrumental)	4:23
Total length:		43:39

== Personnel ==
Credits adapted from album sleeve.

Northlane

- Marcus Bridge – lead vocals
- Jon Deiley – guitars, programming, drum pad
- Josh Smith – guitars
- Alex Milovic – bass
- Nic Pettersen – drums, percussion

Additional personnel

- David Bendeth – production, mixing
- Brian Robbins – engineering, mixing engineering, digital editing
- Mitch Milan – engineering, digital editing
- Ted Jensen – mastering
- Fvckrender (Frederic Duquette) – 3D artwork
- Patrick Galvin – additional artwork, layout

== Charts ==
Chart performance for Mesmer
Chart (2017)	Peak position
Australian Albums (ARIA)	3
New Zealand Heatseeker Albums (RMNZ)	3
UK Digital Albums (OCC)	61
UK Independent Albums (OCC)	31
UK Rock & Metal Albums (OCC)	13
US Heatseekers Albums (Billboard)	11
