= Incarnation (album) =

Studio album by In Hearts Wake
- Released: 12 July 2024
- Recorded: December 2023
- Studio: Schroeder (Bay City)
- Genre: Metalcore
- Length: 39:47
- Label: UNFD
- Producer: Josh Schroeder

In Hearts Wake chronology
Kaliyuga (2020)	Incarnation (2024)

Singles from Incarnation
- 1. "Hollow Bone (The World)" Released: 24 April 2024; 2. "Orphan (The Devil)" Released: 7 June 2024; 3. "The Flood (Justice)" Released: 10 July 2024

Incarnation is the sixth studio album by Australian metalcore band In Hearts Wake. It was released on 12 July 2024 through UNFD. It is their first album without longtime bassist/clean vocalist Kyle Erich.

== Background and promotion ==
On 23 April, the band released the first single "Hollow Bone (The World)" and its corresponding music video. At the same time, they announced the album's release date, cover art, and track list. This was followed by the singles "Orphan (The Devil)" and "The Flood (Justice)".

Vocalist Jake Taylor described the album's concept, "'Incarnation' is the shadow counterpart and sequel to the band’s debut album 'Divination', with each song inspired by the meaning and ideals of a particular Major Arcana Tarot card. There are 22 Major Arcana Tarot cards in every deck and 11 tracks on each record, bringing the vision to completion 12 years later. But much like a coin with two sides, cards flipped upside down deliver the reversed meaning. Polarized in every way, 'Incarnation' explores the dark underbelly to mirror and stand diametrically opposite to 'Divination'."

In Hearts Wake will promote the album via touring as a supporting act for Miss May I in that band's Apologies Are for the Weak 15th anniversary American tour in October and November 2024.

== Critical reception ==
Professional ratings
Review scores
Source	Rating
Kerrang!	4/5
Wall of Sound	9/10

The album received mostly positive reviews from critics. Heavy magazine wrote a positive unrated review for the album and said, "this could be the best Australian heavy music release of the year."

== Track listing ==
All tracks are written by In Hearts Wake.

Incarnation track listing
No.	Title	Length
1.	"Spitting Nails (Wheel of Fortune)"	2:55
2.	"Hollow Bone (The World)"	3:56
3.	"The Flood (Justice)" (featuring Winston McCall of Parkway Drive)	3:10
4.	"Orphan (The Devil)"	3:41
5.	"Gen Doom (The Hierophant)"	3:45
6.	"Shishigami シシ神 (The Empress)" (featuring Kaito Nagai of Paledusk)	3:28
7.	"Tyrant (The Emperor)"	3:52
8.	"Feeding the Dead (Temperance)"	3:10
9.	"Michigama (The Magician)" (featuring Chad Ruhlig of For the Fallen Dreams, David Gunn of King 810, and Alfonso Civile)	2:49
10.	"Shellshock (The High Priestess)" (featuring Garret Rapp of The Color Morale)	3:36
11.	"Transmission (The Sun)"	5:25
Total length:		39:47

Bonus tracks
No.	Title	Length
12.	"Apollo"	2:58
13.	"Carnyx"	3:28
Total length:		46:13

Notes

- Each track's parenthesised subtitle is written in upside-down text; for example, "Spitting Nails (Wheel of Fortune)" is rendered as "Spitting Nails (ǝunʇɹoɟ ɟo lǝǝɥʍ)".

== Personnel ==
In Hearts Wake

- Jake Taylor – lead vocals
- Eaven Dall – lead guitar, backing vocals, Winston McCall vocal recording on track 3
- Ben Nairne – rhythm guitar, bass guitar
- Conor Ward – drums

Additional musicians

- Winston McCall of Parkway Drive – guest vocals on track 3
- Kaito Nagai of Paledusk – guest vocals on track 6
- Chad Ruhlig of For the Fallen Dreams – guest vocals on track 9
- David Gunn of King 810 – guest vocals on track 9
- Alfonso Civile – guest vocals on track 9
- Don Bauer – guest vocals on track 9
- Garret Rapp of The Color Morale – guest vocals on track 10

Technical

- Josh Schroeder – production, mixing, mastering, recording
- Johann Ingemar – album artwork, layout
- Ross Vanosch – additional colouring, design, layout, text
- Milan Chagoury – logo, additional design

== Charts ==
Chart performance for Incarnation
Chart (2024)	Peak position
Australian Albums (ARIA)	49
