= Skydancer (In Hearts Wake album) =

2015 album by In Hearts Wake

Studio album by In Hearts Wake
- Released: 1 May 2015
- Recorded: Late 2013
- Studios: Random Awesome Studios, Bay City, Michigan
- Genres: Metalcore; hardcore
- Length: 33:13
- Labels: UNFD; Rise
- Producers: Josh Schroeder; Dan Brown; Troy Brady

In Hearts Wake chronology
Earthwalker (2014)	Skydancer (2015)	Equinox (2016)

Singles from Skydancer
- 1. "Breakaway" Released: 4 March 2015

Skydancer is the third studio album by Australian metalcore band In Hearts Wake. It was released on 1 May 2015 through UNFD and Rise Records. It was produced by Josh Schroeder, Dan Brown and Troy Brady. It is the continuation of their second studio album Earthwalker. The album peaked at No. 2 at official ARIA Charts. It's the last album to feature Caleb Burton as a writer, with his departure following the release of Skydancer. Nic Pettersen of Northlane played drums on the album, with Caleb being unable to secure a US Visa in time to record the album; producer Josh Schroeder revealed on Reddit that he was originally going to track drums for both Earthwalker and Skydancer, going as far as writing the drum tracks for both records and practicing as a touring member for the upcoming shows close to his studio.

== Background and promotion ==
The single "Breakaway" was released on 4 March 2015, alongside an accompanying music video.

In Hearts Wake played a nine-date Australian tour in June to promote the album.

== Writing and composition ==
The title track "Skydancer" features guest vocals Jonathan Vigil of The Ghost Inside. J Hurley and Ben Marvin of Hacktivist feature on the track "Erase". The track "Intrepid" features Marcus Bridge of Northlane and guitarist Nick Hipa of As I Lay Dying. The album's genre has been described as metalcore and hardcore.

== Critical reception ==
Professional ratings
Review scores
Source	Rating
All Things Loud	8.5/10
Already Heard	4.5/5 stars
Dead Press!	5/10
Impericon	5/6
KillYourStereo	60/100
Louder Sound	3.5/5 stars
New Transcendence	9/10
Rock Sins	7.5/10

The album received generally positive reviews from music critics. Jack Parker from All Things Loud rated the album 8.5 out of 10 and said: "Despite the record following similar structures for the most part, In Hearts Wake have just the right amount of power and edge to make them stand out from their contemporaries." Already Heard rated the album 4.5 out of 5 and said: "This time last year, In Hearts Wake were confidently earmarked for success. Skydancer has not only proved their consistency, but their dedication to their craft and their deserved place as frontrunners for the future of metalcore." Tom Valcanis from Beat magazine praised the album saying: "Skydancer is a blazing record, confirming In Hearts Wake's much vaunted potential has come into bloom." Zach Redrup from Dead Press! rated the album with an average score and saying: "It's mildly befuddling that, given their apparent appetite for grand scale thinking, In Hearts Wake would turn in a record which so heartily smacks of neutered creativity. Unspectacular in the extreme, it's unfortunate that for all its lofty ideals, Skydancer is a rather toothless continuation of metalcore's seemingly immortal blueprint."

In a positive review from Impericon they said: "In Hearts Wake prove that they are able to push the boundaries of the genre without losing themselves in the complex details." In a review from KillYourStereo, Matty Sievers on calling the album average said: "It is filled with songs that are more or less filler for what should have been an otherwise standout album." Louder Sound gave the album a very positive review and stated: "This latest full-length is probably In Hearts Wake's best work yet, and could bring them some well-deserved attention outside of their home turf." New Transcendence gave the album an almost perfect score 9/10 and saying: "As a whole, Skydancer does what it was meant to do and follows up Earthwalker flawlessly, and is definitely some of the band's greatest and most entertaining work so far." Sam Dignon of Rock Sins rated the album 7.5 out of 10 and but said: "Overall, Skydancer is a definite improvement over Earthwalker but it still suffers at points, arguably due to it being part of a double album. However the ambition of In Hearts Wake on this project must be applauded as higher profile bands than them have had worse results with double albums. So whilst it isn't an amazing album, Skydancer shows that In Hearts Wake could become one of the biggest metalcore bands around in the coming years if they continue to progress like they are."

== Track listing ==
No.	Title	Length
1.	"Aether"	1:01
2.	"Skydancer" (featuring Jonathan Vigil of The Ghost Inside)	3:28
3.	"Breakaway"	3:22
4.	"Badlands"	3:15
5.	"Insomnia"	3:05
6.	"Oblivion"	2:07
7.	"Wildfire"	3:12
8.	"Cottonmouth"	3:54
9.	"Erase" (featuring J Hurley and Ben Marvin of Hacktivist)	3:34
10.	"Intrepid" (featuring Marcus Bridge of Northlane and Nick Hipa of As I Lay Dying)	3:44
11.	"Father"	2:26
Total length:		33:13

== Personnel ==
Credits adapted from AllMusic.

In Hearts Wake

- Jake Taylor – unclean vocals
- Eaven Dall – lead guitar, backing vocals
- Ben Nairne – rhythm guitar
- Kyle Erich – bass, clean vocals
- Caleb Burton – drums (credited, but does not perform)

Additional musicians

- Nic Pettersen of Northlane – drums, drum engineering
- Jonathan Vigil of The Ghost Inside – guest vocals on track 3
- Ben Marvin and J Hurley of Hacktivist – guest vocals on track 9
- Marcus Bridge of Northlane – guest vocals on track 10
- Nick Hipa of As I Lay Dying – guest guitar solo on track 10
- Charles Francis Fox – spoken words on track 11

Additional personnel

- Josh Schroeder – production, engineering, mixing, mastering
- Dan Brown – production
- Troy Brady – additional production
- Aaron Pace – editing
- Aaron Hayward – artwork, layout
- Luke Logemann – A&R

== Charts ==
Chart (2015)	Peak position
Australian Albums (ARIA)	2
