= Kaliyuga (album) =

Studio album by In Hearts Wake
- Released: 7 August 2020
- Genres: Metalcore; nu metal
- Length: 40:37
- Label: UNFD
- Producer: Josh Schroeder

In Hearts Wake chronology
Ark (2017)	Kaliyuga (2020)	Incarnation (2024)

Singles from Kaliyuga
- 1. "Worldwide Suicide" Released: 17 March 2020; 2. "Son of a Witch" Released: 24 April 2020; 3. "Hellbringer" Released: 27 May 2020; 4. "Dystopia" Released: 8 July 2020; 5. "Moving On" Released: 5 August 2020

Kaliyuga is the fifth studio album by Australian metalcore band In Hearts Wake. It was released on 7 August 2020 through UNFD. It was produced by Josh Schroeder.

== Background and promotion ==
On 17 March 2020, the band unveiled a new single titled "Worldwide Suicide" along with an accompanying music video in which the band intend to plant a tree for every 1 thousand views the below video for it generates. On 1 April, like with the album cover Seaskimmer, as an April Fool's Day joke the band unveiled another album cover entitled Hellbringer, which is the name of one of the tracks on the album.

On 24 April, the band released the second single "Son of a Witch" along with a corresponding music video. At the same time, the band announced the album itself, the album cover, the track list, and release date. On 27 May, the band released the third single "Hellbringer" featuring Jamie Hails of Polaris. The single was inconspicuously teased by the band as an April Fool's Day joke with revelation that on the "album cover" of the single they already teased that Hails will feature on the song as his face was on the cover but halfway hidden. That same day, the band also revealed other guest musicians that will feature on the album. On 8 July, the band released their fourth single "Dystopia". On 5 August, two days before the album release, the band released their fifth single "Moving On".

== Composition ==
=== Style ===
The genre of the album has been described primarily as metalcore and nu metal while exploring elements of other genres such as rap rock, pop rock, hard rock, and post-hardcore.

== Critical reception ==
Professional ratings
Review scores
Source	Rating
Dead Press!	6/10
Distorted Sound	7/10
Heavy	8/10
Kerrang!	4/5 stars
KillYourStereo	40/100
New Noise	5/5 stars
Rock 'N' Load	9/10
Wall of Sound	6/10

The album received mostly positive reviews, but also mixed reviews from several critics. Carlos Zelaya from Dead Press! rated the album positively but saying: "In Hearts Wake have noble intentions, and have clearly made a real go of it. The consistency isn't really there on a songwriting level, making for generally up and down record, but there's still enough on Kaliyuga to peak interest." Distorted Sound scored the album 7 out of 10 and said: "For everything Kaliyuga doesn't get right is certainly made up for by everything it does hit the nail on the head with. Their metalcore sound has been truly honed to the best it can be, and there are standout cuts through this record that will hold up as some of the best music the band have produced. There might be some questionable vocal performances alongside the standout moments, and also some moments throughout the record that simply highlight how well the band succeed in other areas thanks to their miss of the mark. This is another solid album from a band that have a pretty consistently great career and seem to be intent on simply sharpening the blade even further. For anyone who has already enjoyed the newest offerings from Bury Tomorrow and Polaris will have an absolute field day with this." Heavy magazine in a positive review said: "In Hearts Wake have successfully delivered four career-defining albums revolving around the elements: 'Earth', 'Air', 'Water' and now 'Fire'. Where our world goes next is, to an extent, in our hands." Kerrang! gave the album 4 out of 5 and stated: "It's an acknowledgement that whether or not this music makes any real difference will depend, ultimately, on who's listening. What is clear is that In Hearts Wake have delivered an LP with the substance and accessibility to touch the widest possible audience – and the quality to cement their place at the top table of Aussie metalcore. The righteous little rippers."

Alex Sievers from KillYourStereo gave the album 40 out of 100 and said: "While I applaud In Hearts Wake for putting their money where their mouth is with the eco-friendly, recycled manufacturing around the physical copies of Kaliyuga, I loathe a vast majority of the musical content on this new record. Like Void of Vision's Hyperdaze (2019), Kaliyuga would've instead made for a decent little EP rather than an uninteresting full-length. Because Kaliyuga is an incredibly mixed bag, nothing more than the smouldering ash of the great fire it could've been. For every 'Worldwide Suicide' or 'Dystopia' that dares lift the record up, there's a 'Husk' or a 'Timebomb' ready to cling to its feet and pull it right back down into the depths of hellish mediocrity. At the absolute smallest mercy, however, this is better than Ark. Much like how this album's name-sake marks the end of a cycle or era, I sincerely hope that Kaliyuga so too marks the end of this weaker, poorer cycle of In Hearts Wake's output; that a newer, bolder period for their music is just around the corner." New Noise gave the album a perfect score 5 out of 5 and stated: "The band's sense of 'triumph' thereby feels richly grounded, as the band guide listeners through murky musical depths but subsequently break through the metaphorical surface with their consistently invigorating guitar riffing, propulsive drum rhythm, and bass groove, which together propel the central perspective to the point of finding some kind of metaphorical light on the other side of initial chaos." Rock 'N' Load praised the album saying, "All in all, KALIYUGA is a great release that shows In Hearts Wake grow as musicians to an incredible degree. Being experimental within your sound is never something bands can predict the response to, but it pays off here without question. The album has a familiar sound that's easy to approach while being a refreshing new take on the Metalcore formula at the same time, that both fans of the genre and those who usually look past it will be able to find substance and enjoyment with great ease." Wall of Sound gave the album a score 6/10 and saying: "With the amount of promotion that was put into this album to build hype, I can't help but feel that it is the expectation of what this album could have been is what has lead [sic] to what could possibly be its biggest downfall. There will be fans that enjoy this album, but it definitely isn't for everybody. Perhaps it was written to be appreciated more in a live setting?"

== Track listing ==
Adapted from Apple Music.

Kaliyuga track listing
No.	Title	Length
1.	"Crisis"	1:19
2.	"Worldwide Suicide"	1:56
3.	"Hellbringer" (featuring Jamie Hails of Polaris)	3:22
4.	"Moving On"	2:51
5.	"Timebomb"	3:12
6.	"Son of a Witch"	3:28
7.	"Crossroads" (featuring Georgia Flood)	3:52
8.	"Husk"	4:42
9.	"Nãgá"	0:49
10.	"Force of Life"	3:36
11.	"Iron Dice" (featuring Randy Reimann of Massappeal)	3:41
12.	"Dystopia"	3:25
13.	"2033"	4:18
Total length:		40:37

Kaliyuga booster pack
No.	Title	Length
14.	"Dogma" (featuring Lochie Keogh of Alpha Wolf)	3:11
15.	"Torn in Two"	4:03
16.	"War"	3:30
17.	"Crisis" (live at the Tivoli)	1:18
18.	"Worldwide Suicide" (live at the Tivoli)	2:11
19.	"Timebomb" (live at the Tivoli)	3:21
20.	"Son of a Witch" (live at the Tivoli)	3:34
21.	"Hellbringer" (live at the Tivoli)	3:29
Total length:		64:57

== Personnel ==
In Hearts Wake

- Jake Taylor – lead vocals
- Eaven Dall – lead guitar, backing vocals
- Ben Nairne – rhythm guitar
- Kyle Erich – bass, clean vocals
- Conor Ward – drums

Additional musicians

- Jamie Hails of Polaris – guest vocals on track 3
- Georgia Flood – guest vocals on track 7
- Randy Reimann of Massappeal – guest vocals on track 11
- Lochie Keogh of Alpha Wolf – guest vocals on track 14

Additional personnel

- Josh Schroeder – production

== Charts ==
Chart performance for Kaliyuga
Chart (2020)	Peak position
Australian Albums (ARIA)	3
