= Earthwalker =

Studio album by In Hearts Wake
- Released: 2 May 2014
- Recorded: Late 2013
- Studio: Random Awesome Studios, Bay City, Michigan
- Genre: Metalcore
- Length: 37:45
- Label: UNFD; Rise
- Producer: Josh Schroeder; Dan Brown; Troy Brady

In Hearts Wake chronology
Divination (2012)	Earthwalker (2014)	Skydancer (2015)

Earthwalker is the second studio album by Australian metalcore band In Hearts Wake. It was released on 2 May 2014 through UNFD and Rise Records. It was produced by Josh Schroeder, Dan Brown and Troy Brady. The album peaked at No. 5 at official ARIA Charts.

== Critical reception ==
Professional ratings
Review scores
Source	Rating
Already Heard	3.5/5 stars
Dead Press!	6/10
KillYourStereo	80/100
Rock Sins	6/10
Rock Sound	7/10

The album received generally positive reviews from music critics. Already Heard rated the album 3.5 out of 5 and said: "The saving of the planet and hardcore is a combination that you would not expect, but In Hearts Wake strangely pull it off. Definitely for fans of The Amity Affliction and Parkway Drive, this band is certainly an up and coming one with their growing fan base and ever more expansive touring. I have to give them credit where it is due, for only a second major release, In Hearts Wake have delivered well." Zach Redrup from Dead Press! rated the album positively but saying: "Earthwalker struggles to maintain that level of quality which devotees of modern metalcore are not only accustomed to, but consequently demand. Not a fatal misstep, yet In Heart Wakes will undoubtedly need to fine tune what is a nakedly derivative outlook if they hope to graduate to the globe spanning big leagues." Alex Sievers from KillYourStereo gave the album 80 out of 100 and said: "Still keeping with their 'Parkway Drive with cleans' sound and with cleaner, more melodic guitar work, In Hearts Wake have busted out another great record. It's basically Divination under a different moniker and cover, but it is still strong in its own right. Songs like 'Truenorth' and 'Sacred' are where the band really shines, and proves exactly why these Byron lads are quickly becoming one of Australia's biggest and best bands."

Sam Dignon of Rock Sins rated the album 6 out of 10 and but said: "Unfortunately the rest of the album isn't as strong as the message behind the music. There's nothing particularly bad about Earthwalker but at the same time very little really stands out either. The album is full of everything you'd expect to hear on a metalcore album in 2014: chugging riffs, screamed vocals during the verses while soaring melodies take over on the chorus and lots of breakdowns. If there was a checklist for what to include when writing a metalcore album then In Hearts Wake would have ticked every box. This safe approach to song writing means things get boring pretty quickly on Earthwalker." Rock Sound gave it 7 out of 10 and said: "Joining the ever-growing list of Aussie acts making a big racket internationally in the last few years, In Hearts Wake play a similar blend of super-heavy yet melodic breakdowncore to their peers in Northlane and The Amity Affliction. Hailing straight from the same tiny beachside town as Parkway Drive, this lot mix up brutal djenting with big choruses designed for singalongs. Lyrically, the good cop / bad cop vocalists detail the importance of being environmentally-minded and the evils of industrialisation; a welcome diversion from songs about depression, girls and brotherhood. It's one dimensional, but that dimension is pretty damn good."

== Track listing ==
No.	Title	Length
1.	"Gaia"	0:59
2.	"Earthwalker"	3:54
3.	"Divine"	4:22
4.	"Sacred"	3:42
5.	"Gravity"	4:40
6.	"Healer"	4:20
7.	"Rebirth"	2:52
8.	"Afterglow"	3:47
9.	"Truenorth"	3:02
10.	"Wildflower"	3:48
11.	"Mother"	2:16
Total length:		37:45

== Personnel ==
Credits adapted from AllMusic.

In Hearts Wake

- Jake Taylor – unclean vocals
- Eaven Dall – lead guitar, backing vocals
- Ben Nairne – rhythm guitar
- Kyle Erich – bass, clean vocals
- Caleb Burton – drums (credited, but does not perform)

Additional musicians

- Nic Pettersen of Northlane – drums, drum engineering
- Joel Birch of The Amity Affliction – guest vocals on track 2, "Earthwalker"
- Elizabeth Joane Fox – spoken words on track 11, "Mother"

Additional personnel

- Josh Schroeder – production, engineering, mastering, mixing
- Dan Brown – production
- Troy Brady – additional production, vocal engineering
- Aaron Pace – editing
- Luke Logemann – A&R

== Charts ==
Chart (2014)	Peak position
Australian Albums (ARIA)	5
