= Equinox (EP) =

2017 EP by Northlane and In Hearts Wake

EP by Northlane and In Hearts Wake
- Released: 20 April 2016
- Recorded: January 2016
- Studio: Holes and Corners, Southbank, Victoria, Australia; Sing Sing Recording Studios, South Yarra, Victoria
- Genre: Metalcore; post-hardcore; progressive metal
- Length: 11:44
- Label: UNFD
- Producer: Will Putney

Northlane chronology
Node (2015)	Equinox (2016)	Mesmer (2017)

In Hearts Wake chronology
Skydancer (2015)	Equinox (2016)	Ark (2017)

Equinox is a collaborative EP by Australian metalcore bands Northlane and In Hearts Wake. It was released on 20 April 2016 through UNFD. It was produced by Will Putney and recorded in January 2016 at Holes and Corners recording studio in Southbank, Victoria, although the drumming was recorded at Sing Sing Recording Studios in South Yarra. It peaked at No. 75 on the ARIA Charts.

A limited edition vinyl was released of only 600 copies.

== Background and promotion ==
According to In Hearts Wake guitarist Ben Nairne, a collaboration between the two bands had been in the works since at least 2015, however both band's busy schedules didn't permit them any free time. The extended play was recorded in secret and released without any prior announcement on 20 April 2016. To promote the EP, Northlane and In Hearts Wake co-headlined a tour in June. Supporting them were Hands Like Houses and Ocean Grove.

A music video for the entire EP was released on 19 October.

== Writing and composition ==
In Hearts Wake frontman Jake Taylor described it as a "surprise twelve-minute EP odyssey". Equinox contains messages and themes of environmental preservation and other politically relevant issues. The track "Refuge" concerns the then-current issue of illegal immigration to Australia. "Hologram" describes how communities can be destroyed by people who are controlled by fear. The middle, and title track "Equinox" is an instrumental piece that connects the other two tracks. The extended play's genre has been described as metalcore, post-hardcore and progressive metal.

== Critical reception ==
Professional ratings
Review scores
Source	Rating
AAA Backstage	5/5 stars
Beat	2/3 stars
SpeakerTV	8/10

The EP received mostly positive reviews. AAA Backstage rated it positively and said: "Melding their two distinctive heavy sounds together, the new unique sound brings a more aggressive, metal aspect to the bands' sonic products." Jack Ford from SpeakerTV gave the EP an 8 out of 10 saying: "Frontmen-in-crime Marcus Bridge and Jake Taylor unite to create a vocal soundscape that adheres simultaneously to both their styles, and pushes them to unforseen [sic] boundaries whilst also staying true to themselves, as their merry bands of metal misfits take musical depth to staggering new highs." Rod Whitfield from Beat rated it positively, however stated: "I expected a little more than just two songs with two minutes of ambient noise in between."

Alasdair Belling from Howls & Echoes in a positive review said: "The Equinox EP is a fabulous gift to the Australian music scene, and an exciting indication of how far the metalcore community has come since the days of Parkway Drive and I Killed the Prom Queen." Evan Conway from Metal Machine gave it a negative review saying: "The truth about the Equinox EP is that it is uneventful, uninspiring, and unremarkable, no matter how you attempt to describe it."

== Track listing ==
Adapted from Spotify.

All tracks are written by Jake Taylor, Jon Deiley, and Josh Smith.

No.	Title	Length
1.	"Refuge"	5:07
2.	"Equinox"	2:07
3.	"Hologram"	4:30
Total length:		11:44

== Personnel ==
Northlane

- Marcus Bridge – lead vocals
- Jon Deiley – guitars
- Josh Smith – guitars
- Alex Milovic – bass
- Nic Pettersen – drums, percussion

In Hearts Wake

- Jake Taylor – unclean vocals
- Eaven Dall – guitars, backing vocals
- Ben Nairne – guitars
- Kyle Erich – bass, clean vocals
- Conor Ward – drums

Production

- Will Putney – production, mixing, mastering

== Charts ==
Chart (2016)	Peak position
Australian Singles (ARIA)	75
