= In Hearts Wake =

Australian metalcore band

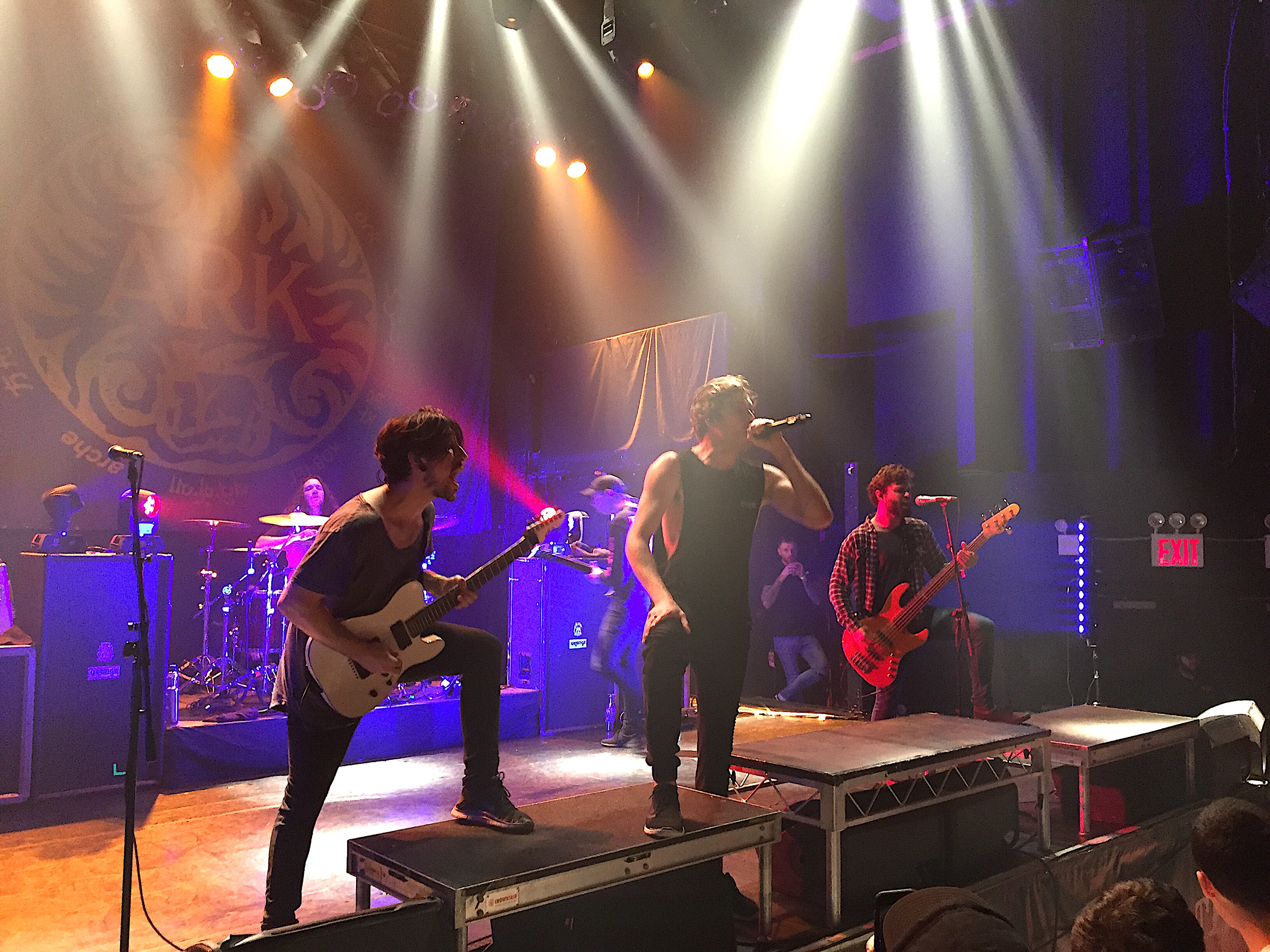
- In Hearts Wake performing in 2017

Background information
- Origin: Byron Bay, New South Wales, Australia
- Genres: Metalcore; hardcore; nu metal
- Years active: 2006–present
- Labels: UNFD; Rise; New Justice
- Members: Jake Taylor; Eaven Dall; Ben Nairne; Conor Ward
- Past members: Jayke West; Jack Deacon; Caleb Burton; Kyle Erich
- Website: inheartswake.com

In Hearts Wake are an Australian metalcore band from Byron Bay, formed in 2006. The band comprises vocalist Jake Taylor, guitarists Eaven Dall and Ben Nairne, and drummer Conor Ward. They have released six studio albums: Divination, Earthwalker, Skydancer, Ark, Kaliyuga and Incarnation, which was released on 12 July 2024. The band's lyrical themes include environmentalism, environmental justice, spirituality, personal struggles, global warming, conservation, and other social issues.

== History ==
=== Early years and first releases (2006–2010) ===
In Hearts Wake were formed in early 2006 composed of five friends that originate from Byron Bay, Australia. In July 2006, the band recorded their first demo track "True Love Is Hard to Find". In December 2006, they recorded their debut 7-track EP, entitled Into the Storm. In early 2007, the band welcomed new drummer Caleb Burton and began to refine their sound, writing faster, heavier, more technical and melodic songs. In July 2007, they embarked on a tour that covered three Australian states and three major cities.

In December 2007, with an average age of just seventeen, the band began their 5-month studio recording schedule at SAE Institute in Byron Bay to produce their second EP with Scottish producer/engineer James Lyall, entitled The Gateway, which was self-financed by the producer and musicians and mixed by respected US engineer Daniel Castleman (As I Lay Dying, Winds of Plague). In 2010, the band produced a split-EP together with the hardcore band The Bride.

=== Divination (2011–2013) ===
In Hearts Wake signed their first professional recording deal with UNFD in July 2012. Their debut studio album, Divination, was released on 31 August 2012. Josh Schroeder produced the album at Random Awesome Studios in the United States of America. Divination peaked at 27 on the ARIA charts.

In March 2013, they played four shows in New Zealand. In June, another Australia tour followed with support from Counterparts, The Storm Picturesque and Stories. The first tour throughout Australia was held in September. In Hearts Wake toured with Landscapes as support for The Amity Affliction in Europe. The tour led the bands throughout the United Kingdom, Germany, Belgium, France and Austria. The band continued touring together with The Amity Affliction on their "Brothers in Arms Australia Tour" alongside Chelsea Grin and Stick to Your Guns as support.

Between 30 August 2013 and 8 September 2013, the band toured Australia alongside Like Moths to Flames and label mates Hand of Mercy in support of the "Homebound Tour" of Dream On, Dreamer. After the "Homebound Tour", the band played four shows with British electronicore group Enter Shikari.

=== Earthwalker and Skydancer (2013–2015) ===
In February and March 2014, they played Soundwave Festival in Australia for the first time. Before playing at Soundwave, the band headlined the "Skydancer Australia Tour" with support from Hand of Mercy and Hellions. The earnings of the tour went to the band's own Skydancer project.

The musicians announced they would release a new album, Earthwalker, on 2 May 2014 and in Europe at the end of May. The album peaked at No. 5 at official ARIA Charts. In June, the band toured Australia again to promote Earthwalker with support from Being as an Ocean, Dream On, Dreamer, Endless Heights, and Sierra.

In early March 2015, the band announced that they would be releasing a new album entitled Skydancer in May 2015. Jake Taylor stated in a documentary that the band actually recorded the new album alongside their second studio album Earthwalker.

The band support Northlane on their "North American Node Tour" in the summer of 2015, Oceans Ate Alaska and Like Moths to Flames were support. The band then returned to North America the same year in the fall to support Parkway Drive on the "IRE Tour". Thy Art Is Murder and Miss May I joined as support.

On 31 March 2016, as an April Fool's Day joke, the band unveiled the final piece in their three album series entitled Seaskimmer to be released 6 May 2016.

=== Equinox (2016–2017) ===
On 19 April 2016, the band announced that they had been working on a collaborative EP with Northlane entitled Equinox. It was recorded in January in Melbourne with producer Will Putney. The EP features three songs: "Refuge", "Equinox" and "Hologram" and was released on 20 April, through UNFD. To promote the EP, Northlane and In Hearts Wake co-headlined a tour in June. Supporting them were Hands Like Houses and Ocean Grove. On 5 December, touring member Conor Ward was officially announced as the band's new drummer.

=== Ark and Ark Prevails (2017–2019) ===
On 2 April 2017, the band unveiled a new song "Warcry" during their UK tour in support of While She Sleeps. On 26 April, another single, "Passage", was released, and it was announced that both tracks were taken from their upcoming album Ark, released on 26 May 2017.

Prior to the album's release, the band announced an Australian headline tour with While She Sleeps and Crossfaith in July 2017. The band also announced their We Are Waterborne Initiative, aiming to clean up beaches in Australia and around the world with their fans. Due to overwhelming support and praise for the Initiative, the band released a third track from Ark, "Waterborne", on 23 May. After the release of Ark on 26 May, the album debuted at No. 3 on the Australian ARIA Charts. In North America the band opened up for August Burns Red on their Messengers 10th Anniversary Tour with Protest the Hero and '68 as support.

To celebrate the release of Ark, the band embarked on their first beach clean-ups with fans for their newly created We Are Waterborne Initiative. Subsequent events were organized in New Zealand and regional Australia throughout 2017 and 2018 with the help of local marine conservation organizations Tangaroa Blue and Sea Shepherd.

On 6 July, In Hearts Wake released a music video for the single "Nomad". The music video features an all-girl mosh pit and is accompanied by a message from the band regarding safety and self-expression for all fans at their shows. Shortly after, the band embarked on their Australian "Ark Tour", and also toured extensively in Europe and the United States in late 2017, co-headlining with Fit for a King, and support from Like Moths to Flames and Phinehas. At the start of 2018, the band kicked off their 28-date "Great Southern Land Tour", which included shows all across Australia.

On 2 February 2018, the band released Ark Prevails, a four-track Ark companion EP that includes three "re-imagined" acoustic versions of the songs "Frequency", "Waterborne", and "Arrow", the latter of which features guest vocals from CJ Gilpin, frontwoman of the UK band Dream State, as well as a new ambient instrumental track entitled "Adrift (Outro)". The release date of the EP was alluded to in the Ark album tray, which contained a hidden secret message that could be decoded using a cipher. According to frontman Jake Taylor:

Last year we hid 02.02.18 within the Ark CD booklet and it could only be revealed by using the cypher (only a few figured it out!). So today we finally reveal to you Ark Prevails, bonus re-imaginings of three tracks as well as a special ambient piece. Some of these renditions you would have heard us play acoustically at our Marine Debris clean ups, which took place on the shores of waterways around the world. This four track offering is a thank you to everyone helping to re-steer the ship. May the Ark Prevail.

— Jake Taylor

All proceeds from the sale of Ark Prevails, via Bandcamp's "name your price" model, goes to Sea Shepherd Australia. In Hearts Wake also joined the final touring portion of the Vans Warped Tour in 2018. They were joined along with Motionless in White, Simple Plan, Unearth, Every Time I Die, Wage War, Chelsea Grin, Crown the Empire, Nekrogoblikon and much more. After which, in June they performed an all ages "Ark Tour" in Sydney, Melbourne, and Brisbane.

In January 2019, the band performed their Summer Setlist Tour and performed in Geelong, Albury, Canberra, Wollongong, Penrith and Newcastle, while also performing at UNIFY Gathering 2019 along the way. The tour was supported by Alpha Wolf and Drown This City, and was In Hearts Wake's only NSW, ACT & VIC shows for the year.

=== Kaliyuga (2020–2023) ===
On 17 March 2020, the band unveiled a new single titled "Worldwide Suicide" along with an accompanying music video in which the band intend to plant a tree for every 1 thousand views the below video for it generates. On 1 April, like with the album cover Seaskimmer, as an April Fool's Day joke the band unveiled another album cover entitled Hellbringer. On 24 April, the band released the second single "Son of a Witch" from their upcoming fifth studio album, Kaliyuga, which is scheduled to be released on 7 August 2020 along with a corresponding music video. At the same time, the band announced the album itself, the album cover, the track list, and release date.

On 27 May, the band released the third single "Hellbringer" featuring Jamie Hails of Polaris. The single was inconspicuously teased by the band as an April Fool's Day joke with revelation that on the "album cover" of the single they already teased that Hails will feature on the song as his face was on the cover but halfway hidden. That same day, the band also revealed other guest musicians that will feature on the album. On 8 July, the band released their fourth single "Dystopia". On 5 August, two days before the album release, the band released their fifth single "Moving On".

=== Erich's departure and Incarnation (2024–present) ===
On 10 April 2024, In Hearts Wake announced that bassist Kyle Erich departed from the band on good terms. To commemorate Erich's time and influence in the band, the band released an emotional, heavy new track, "Farewell". The music video flashes through the group's touring and recording career, with Erich's clean vocals dominating the song as the clip showcases Erich's family life. On 23 April, the band released the first single "Hollow Bone (The World)" and its corresponding music video. At the same time, they announced that their upcoming sixth studio album, Incarnation, is set for release on 12 July 2024 whilst also revealing the album cover and the track list.

== Musical style ==
In Hearts Wake's musical style has been described as metalcore, hardcore, and nu metal.

== Band members ==
Current

- Jake Taylor – lead vocals (2006–present)
- Eaven Dall – lead guitar, backing vocals (2006–present), bass (2024–present; touring only)
- Ben Nairne – rhythm guitar (2006–present), bass (2023–2024; studio only)
- Conor Ward – drums (2016–present; touring member 2015–2016)

Former

- Jayke West – drums (2006–2007)
- Jack Deacon – bass (2006–2010)
- Caleb Burton – drums (2007–2015)
- Kyle Erich – bass, clean vocals (2011–2024; touring 2024)

Timeline

== Discography ==
=== Studio albums ===
List of studio albums, with selected chart positions
Title	Album details	Peak chart positions
Title	Album details	AUS
Divination	Released: 31 August 2012; Label: UNFD, Rise; Format: CD, LP, digital download, streaming	27
Earthwalker	Released: 2 May 2014; Label: UNFD, Rise; Format: CD, LP, cassette, digital download, streaming	5
Skydancer	Released: 1 May 2015; Label: UNFD, Rise; Format: CD, LP, digital download, streaming	2
Ark	Released: 26 May 2017; Label: UNFD, Rise; Format: CD, LP, digital download, streaming	3
Kaliyuga	Released: 7 August 2020; Label: UNFD; Format: CD, LP, digital download, streaming	3
Incarnation	Released: 12 July 2024; Label: UNFD; Format: CD, LP, digital download, streaming	49

=== Soundtrack albums ===
List of soundtrack albums, with selected details
Title	Album details
Green Is the New Black	Released: 5 August 2022; Label: UNFD; Format: CD, LP, digital download, streaming

=== Extended plays ===
List of extended plays, with selected chart positions
Title	EP details	Peak chart positions
Title	EP details	AUS
Into the Storm	Released: 12 April 2007; Label: Self-released; Format: CD, digital download	—
The Gateway	Released: 1 October 2008; Label: Self-released; Format: CD, digital download	—
The Bride / In Hearts Wake (with The Bride)	Released: 26 September 2010; Label: New Justice; Format: CD, digital download	—
Equinox (with Northlane)	Released: 20 April 2016; Label: UNFD; Format: EP, digital download, streaming	75
Ark Prevails	Released: 1 February 2018; Label: UNFD; Format: Digital download, streaming	—
"—" denotes a recording that did not chart.

=== Featured appearances ===
List of appearances as a featured artist on songs by other artists
Title	Year	Album
"Welcome To Mayhem" (PhaseOne featuring In Hearts Wake)	2017	Origins - EP
"Bringer of Death" (PhaseOne featuring In Hearts Wake)	2023	Sounds of Mayhem: The Uprising

== Awards and nominations ==
=== AIR Awards ===
The Australian Independent Record Awards (known colloquially as the AIR Awards) is an annual awards night to recognise, promote and celebrate the success of Australia's Independent Music sector.

Year	Nominee / work	Award	Result	Ref.
2021	Kaliyuga	Best Independent Heavy Album or EP	Nominated	

=== ARIA Music Awards ===
The ARIA Music Awards are a set of annual ceremonies presented by Australian Recording Industry Association (ARIA), which recognise excellence, innovation, and achievement across all genres of the music of Australia. They commenced in 1987.

Year	Nominee / work	Award	Result	Ref.
2015	Skydancer	Best Hard Rock/Heavy Metal Album	Nominated	
2022	Green Is the New Black	Best Original Soundtrack or Musical Theatre Cast Album	Nominated	

=== Environmental Music Prize ===
The Environmental Music Prize is a quest to find a theme song to inspire action on climate and conservation. It commenced in 2022.

Year	Nominee / work	Award	Result	Ref.
2022	"Worldwide Suicide"	Environmental Music Prize	Nominated	

=== J Awards ===
The J Awards are an annual series of Australian music awards that were established by the Australian Broadcasting Corporation's youth-focused radio station Triple J. They commenced in 2005.

Year	Nominee / work	Award	Result	Ref.
2022	Jake Taylor / In Hearts Wake	You Done Good Award	Nominated	
