= Divination (album) =

2012 album by In Hearts Wake

Studio album by In Hearts Wake
- Released: 31 August 2012
- Recorded: Early 2012
- Studio: Random Awesome Studio, Bay City, Michigan
- Genre: Metalcore; hardcore
- Length: 34:48
- Label: UNFD; Rise
- Producer: Josh Schroeder

In Hearts Wake chronology
The Bride / In Hearts Wake (2010)	Divination (2012)	Earthwalker (2014)

Singles from Divination
- 1. "Traveller (The Fool)" Released: 18 July 2012

Divination is the debut studio album by Australian metalcore band In Hearts Wake. It was released on 31 August 2012 through UNFD and Rise Records. It was produced by Josh Schroeder and recorded at Random Awesome Studio in Bay City during early 2012.

== Background and promotion ==
Describing the concept behind the album vocalist Jake Taylor said:

Divination is based upon a 'Tarot' concept in that each song emulates the essence and meaning of a particular Major Arcana Tarot card. My mother is a professional Tarot reader here in the hills of Byron Bay. Her divinatory practice is always carried out with love and good intention, it provided me with the inspiration to transform this idea into a conceptual album. This is dedicated to her.

— Jake Taylor,

On 18 July 2012, the single "Traveller (The Fool)" was released alongside an accompanying music video. During August and September, In Hearts Wake supported Dream On, Dreamer on their Australian national tour alongside Hand of Mercy. In October and November, the band headlined an album release tour for Divination. Supporting them were Sienna Skies, Shinto Katana, and Hallowers.

== Writing and composition ==
Each song is named after a tarot card and each represent different ideals, vocalist Jake Taylor described the meaning behind each song. The track "Neverland (The Star)" describes people in adulthood slowly losing their sense of innocence and wishing to be taken back to the days of their youth. The track "Traveller (The Fool)" is about Taylor's wish to be "Joyous, happy and free from the ties of society, and living in harmony with the earth." The track "Departure (Death)" concerns "[dealing] with one of our greatest challenges: letting go." The track "The Unknown (Strength)" is about the need to have "courage, bravery and fortitude" in order to get through hard times. The track "Survival (The Chariot)" tells the story of working-class citizens "Year after year working on someone else's clock, all in an attempt to fund doing what [they] love."

The track "Inertia (The Hermit)" deals with "solitude, patience and through wisdom it can help light the way." The track "B.I.A. (The Hanged Man)" is written about a close friend of Taylor's who died from suicide a year prior and depicts his inner conflict. The track "Shapeless (Judgement)" describes the evils of "Twisted political regimes use fear as the weapon to infect our minds." The track "Loreley (The Lovers)" depicts "the shadow of 'The Lovers' in that sometimes we are blinded by what we want to see and not what's actually before us." The track "Winterfell (The Tower)" is written "from the earth's perspective and depicts justice upon humankind for the misguided treatment of Mother Nature." The final track "Release (The Moon)" depicts "Tides of emotion enable us to see through rigidity and structure."

Winston McCall of Parkway Drive performs on the track "Departure (Death)". Chad Ruhlig of For the Fallen Dreams is featured on the next track "The Unknown (Strength)". "Inertia (The Hermit)" features guest vocals from vocalist of The Color Morale, Garret Rapp. Similarly, "Shapeless (Judgment)" features former vocalist of Northlane, Adrian Fitipaldes. The album's genre has been described as being metalcore, and hardcore.

== Critical reception ==
Eli Gould from The Music stated in a positive review: "While Divination at its peak is not a groundbreaking release, it is a very consistent sounding record that offers many highlights through its entirety."

== Track listing ==
Adapted from Apple Music.

No.	Title	Length
1.	"Neverland (The Star)"	2:27
2.	"Traveller (The Fool)"	3:04
3.	"Departure (Death)" (featuring Winston McCall of Parkway Drive)	3:37
4.	"The Unknown (Strength)" (featuring Chad Ruhlig of For the Fallen Dreams)	2:52
5.	"Survival (The Chariot)"	3:54
6.	"Inertia (The Hermit)" (featuring Garret Rapp of The Color Morale)	3:40
7.	"B.I.A. (The Hanged Man)"	2:58
8.	"Shapeless (Judgement)" (featuring Adrian Fitipaldes of Northlane)	3:20
9.	"Loreley (The Lovers)"	2:48
10.	"Winterfell (The Tower)"	3:23
11.	"Release (The Moon)"	2:41
Total length:		34:48

== Personnel ==
In Hearts Wake

- Jake Taylor – unclean vocals
- Eaven Dall – lead guitar, backing vocals
- Ben Nairne – rhythm guitar
- Kyle Erich – bass, clean vocals
- Caleb Burton – drums

Additional musicians

- Winston McCall of Parkway Drive – guest vocals on track 3
- Chad Ruhlig of For the Fallen Dreams – guest vocals on track 4
- Garret Rapp of The Color Morale – guest vocals on track 6
- Adrian Fitipaldes of Northlane – guest vocals on track 8

Additional personnel

- Josh Schroeder – production, engineering, mixing, mastering

== Charts ==
Chart (2012)	Peak position
Australian Albums (ARIA)	27
