= Obsidian (Northlane album) =

Studio album by Northlane
- Released: 22 April 2022
- Recorded: April–June 2021
- Studios: Chris Blancato's Studio, Sydney, New South Wales, Australia
- Genres: Metalcore; electronic; industrial metal; progressive metal
- Length: 56:15
- Labels: Worldeater; Believe
- Producer: Northlane

Northlane chronology
Alien (2019)	Obsidian (2022)	Mirror's Edge (2024)

Singles from Obsidian
- 1. "Clockwork" Released: 18 March 2021; 2. "Echo Chamber" Released: 10 November 2021; 3. "Plenty" Released: 27 January 2022; 4. "Carbonized" Released: 23 March 2022

Obsidian is the sixth studio album by Australian heavy metal band Northlane. Originally scheduled for release on 1 April 2022, it was released on 22 April 2022 through the band's independent label Worldeater Records and distributed by Believe Music. It was self-produced by the band themselves and recorded at Chris Blancato's Studio in Sydney.

At the 2022 ARIA Music Awards, the album was nominated for Best Hard Rock or Heavy Metal Album.

The album was nominated for Australian Album of the Year at the 2022 J Awards.

At the AIR Awards of 2023, the album was nominated for Independent Album of the Year and won Best Independent Heavy Album or EP.

== Background and promotion ==
On 18 March 2021, the band released a brand new single "Clockwork" along with an accompanying music video. The single has been chosen as the official theme song for the video game Tom Clancy's Rainbow Six Siege at that year's Oceanic Nationals eSports League. On the same day, they also announced that bassist Brendon Padjasek departed from the band in order to focus on his home life, with the group intending to continue on as a quartet for the time being, with Jon Deiley handling bass duties since. On 19 April, the band confirmed that they had begun recording the album. On 10 June, the band announced that they have finished recording the album.

On 10 November, the band officially released the new lead single "Echo Chamber" along with its music video. At the same time, the band revealed the album itself, the album cover, the track list, and release date. To promote the album, the band also announced their upcoming Australia tour which will start in June 2022 with Plini, Sleep Token and ALT as supports. On 27 January 2022, the band unveiled the third single "Plenty". On 20 February, due to the ongoing supply chain issues, the band announced that they pushed back the release of the album to 22 April. On 23 March, one month before the album release, the band released the fourth single "Carbonized" and its corresponding music video.

== Critical reception ==
Professional ratings
Review scores
Source	Rating
Blabbermouth.net	6/10
Distorted Sound	9/10
Kerrang!	3/5 stars
KillYourStereo	5/5 stars
Rock Sins	6/10
Wall of Sound	6.5/10

The album received mixed to positive reviews from critics. Taylor Markarian from Blabbermouth.net gave the album 6 out of 10 and said: "In the end, Obsidian is a highly experimental record that sounds like a mishmash of the members' favorite genres. A little more finesse in the songwriting would have made it more palatable and given it a greater sense of direction." Distorted Sound scored the album 9 out of 10 and said: "Obsidian is nothing short of transcendental, displaying the frightening potential NORTHLANE have at their fingertips to continuously reinvent their sound. Whilst significantly longer than their previous efforts there are no moments which feel unnecessary or expendable. Each track is formidable enough to stand on its own and keep you engaged on the euphoric journey they have created. Not like we needed any further evidence that they are a phenomenally talented collective but this release has further cemented their legacy as one of the most inventive bands in the world." Kerrang! gave the album 3 out of 5 and stated: "After the success they experienced with previous album Alien, it would have been easy for Northlane to rest on their laurels, but instead they continued to expand and develop their sound in exciting and unexpected ways on Obsidian – their job here is done."

Lili Jean Berry from KillYourStereo gave the album 5 out of 5 and said: "Overall thoughts are that this definitely feels like the natural progressive step for Northlane. They've matured without sounding foreign and they've explored without being jarring." Kyle Dimond of Rock Sins rated the album 6 out of 10 and said: "Obsidian's musical content unfortunately shares some of the characteristics of the themes that it touches on. It's a record that sounds like it's moving forward and constantly shifting but in the process, has left behind a sense of connection." Wall of Sound gave the album a score 6.5/10 and saying: "By Obsidian's own merits, it's not mediocre or awful. But most everything on Obsidian just hits and lands differently and, well, lesser."

== Track listing ==
All lyrics are written by Northlane; all music is composed by Northlane.

Obsidian track listing
No.	Title	Length
1.	"Clarity"	5:53
2.	"Clockwork"	3:58
3.	"Echo Chamber"	3:47
4.	"Carbonized"	3:45
5.	"Abomination"	4:10
6.	"Plenty"	3:40
7.	"Is This a Test?"	3:30
8.	"Xen"	5:48
9.	"Cypher"	4:37
10.	"Nova"	4:27
11.	"Inamorata"	3:50
12.	"Obsidian"	3:56
13.	"Dark Solitaire"	4:54
Total length:		56:15

Deluxe edition bonus tracks
No.	Title	Length
1.	"Clarity" (instrumental)	5:53
2.	"Clockwork" (instrumental)	3:58
3.	"Echo Chamber" (instrumental)	3:47
4.	"Carbonized" (instrumental)	3:45
5.	"Abomination" (instrumental)	4:10
6.	"Plenty" (instrumental)	3:40
7.	"Is This a Test?" (instrumental)	3:30
8.	"Xen" (instrumental)	5:48
9.	"Cypher" (instrumental)	4:37
10.	"Nova" (instrumental)	4:27
11.	"Inamorata" (instrumental)	3:50
12.	"Obsidian" (instrumental)	3:56
13.	"Dark Solitaire" (instrumental)	4:54
Total length:		56:15

== Personnel ==
Northlane

- Marcus Bridge – lead vocals
- Jon Deiley – guitars, bass, programming, drum pad
- Josh Smith – guitars
- Nic Pettersen – drums, percussion

Additional personnel

- Northlane – production
- Chris Blancato – additional production, engineering
- Adam "Nolly" Getgood – mixing
- Ermin Hamidovic – mastering
- Dan Barkle – artwork

== Charts ==
Chart performance for Obsidian
Chart (2022)	Peak position
Australian Albums (ARIA)	1
UK Album Downloads (Official Charts)	29
UK Rock & Metal Albums (Official Charts)	22
