= Northlane =

Australian heavy metal band

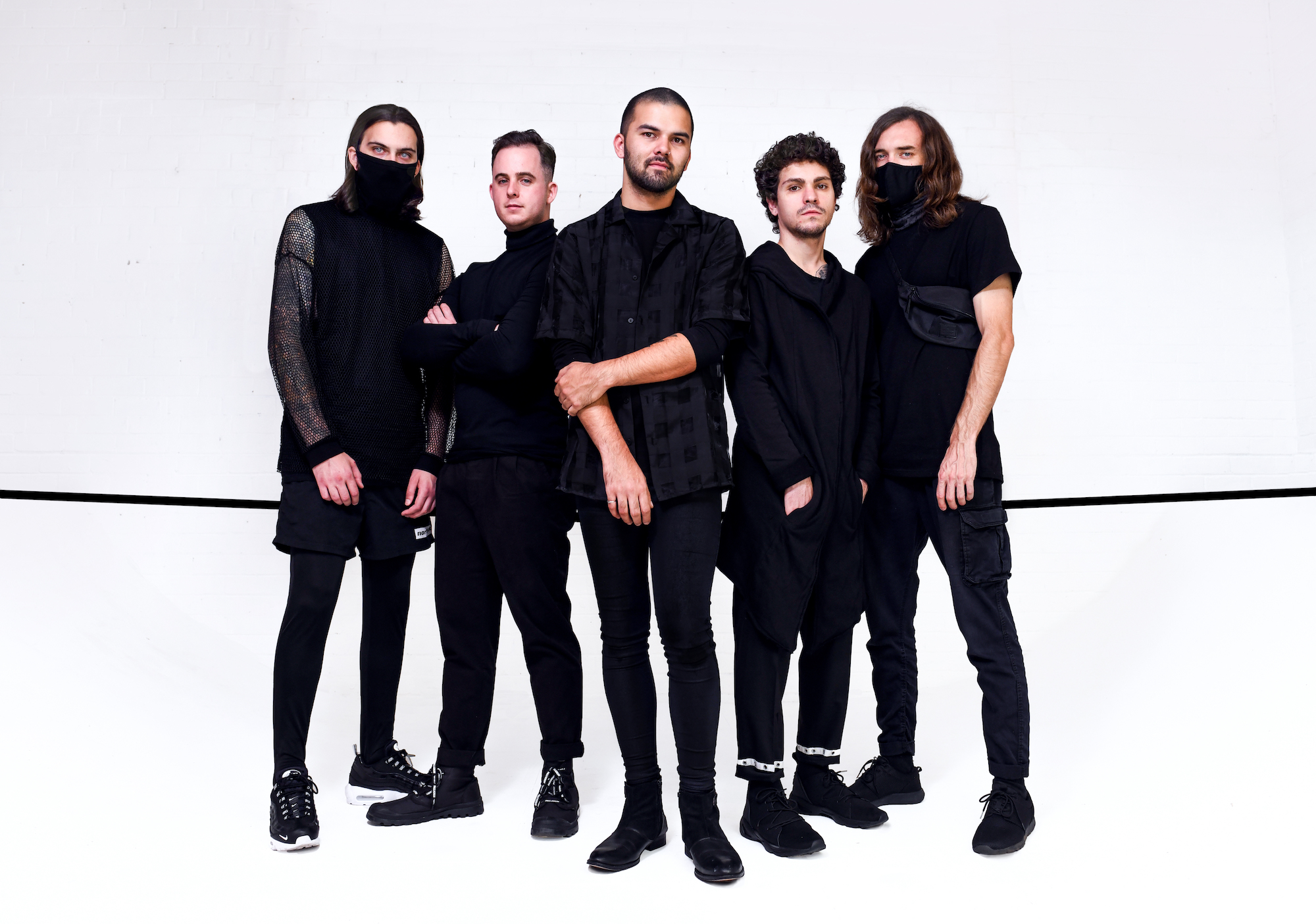
- Northlane in 2019. From left to right: Jon Deiley, Josh Smith, Marcus Bridge, Brendon Padjasek, Nic Pettersen

Background information
- Origin: Blacktown, New South Wales, Australia
- Genres: Metalcore; progressive metalcore; djent; alternative metal; industrial metal
- Works: Northlane discography
- Years active: 2009–present
- Labels: UNFD; Distort; Rise; New Damage; Worldeater; Believe
- Members: Jon Deiley; Josh Smith; Nic Pettersen; Marcus Bridge
- Past members: Brendan Derby; Mitchell Collier; Simon Anderson; Adrian Fitipaldes; Alex Milovic; Brendon Padjasek
- Website: northlaneband.com

Northlane are an Australian heavy metal band from Blacktown, formed in 2009. Their style is primarily described as metalcore and progressive metalcore. The band comprises guitarists Jon Deiley and Josh Smith, drummer Nic Pettersen and vocalist Marcus Bridge. Northlane have released six studio albums: Discoveries (11 November 2011); Singularity (22 March 2013), which reached No. 3 on the ARIA Albums Chart; Node (24 July 2015), a number-one album; Mesmer (24 March 2017), Alien (2 August 2019) and Obsidian (22 April 2022). At the ARIA Music Awards of 2015 the group won the Best Hard Rock or Heavy Metal Album category for their album Node. At the ARIA Music Awards of 2017, the band won again with Mesmer. The band won the Best Hard Rock or Heavy Metal Album category for the third time at the ARIA Music Awards of 2019 for their 2019 album Alien.

== History ==
=== 2009–2012: Early years and Discoveries ===
Northlane were formed in 2009 as a metalcore band in Blacktown by Jon Deiley on lead guitar, Brendan Derby on drums and percussion, Adrian Fitipaldes on lead vocals, Alex Milovic on bass guitar, and Josh Smith on rhythm guitar. They are named after the 2007 track "North Lane" by British metalcore band, Architects. In 2013, Fitipaldes described their formation, "pretty much, through the internet and common interest" where Deiley and Milovic had contacted each other to start song writing. He continued that "once they had the songs down, they started recruiting members."

Their six-track debut extended play, Hollow Existence, was released in January 2010: it was generally well received. Kill Your Stereo's All Shall Perish praised the group's "admirable and mature standard, a vital quality that is rapidly becoming extinct in most up-and-coming Australian bands" and summarised that it is a "Fantastic six track EP that has substantial replay value and will leave you craving more." Northlane toured Australia in support and "established a reputation as a tireless live act."

In late 2011, the band signed to the UNFD record label, which released their first studio album, Discoveries, in November that year. It reached the ARIA Albums Chart Top 100, No. 49 on the ARIA Digital Albums chart and No. 1 on the ARIA Hitseekers Albums chart. The album was followed by the Discoveries tour around Australia, and tours supporting August Burns Red and House Vs Hurricane shortly afterwards. Parkway Drive took them on the Sick Summer tour in February 2012.

In September 2012, the band went to Canada on tour with Counterparts and Stray from the Path. At the end of the tour, they settled in New York City to record their new album with Will Putney. In December 2012, the band toured with in arenas with Parkway Drive on their "Atlas" tour in Australia.

=== 2013–2014: Singularity and Fitipaldes' departure ===
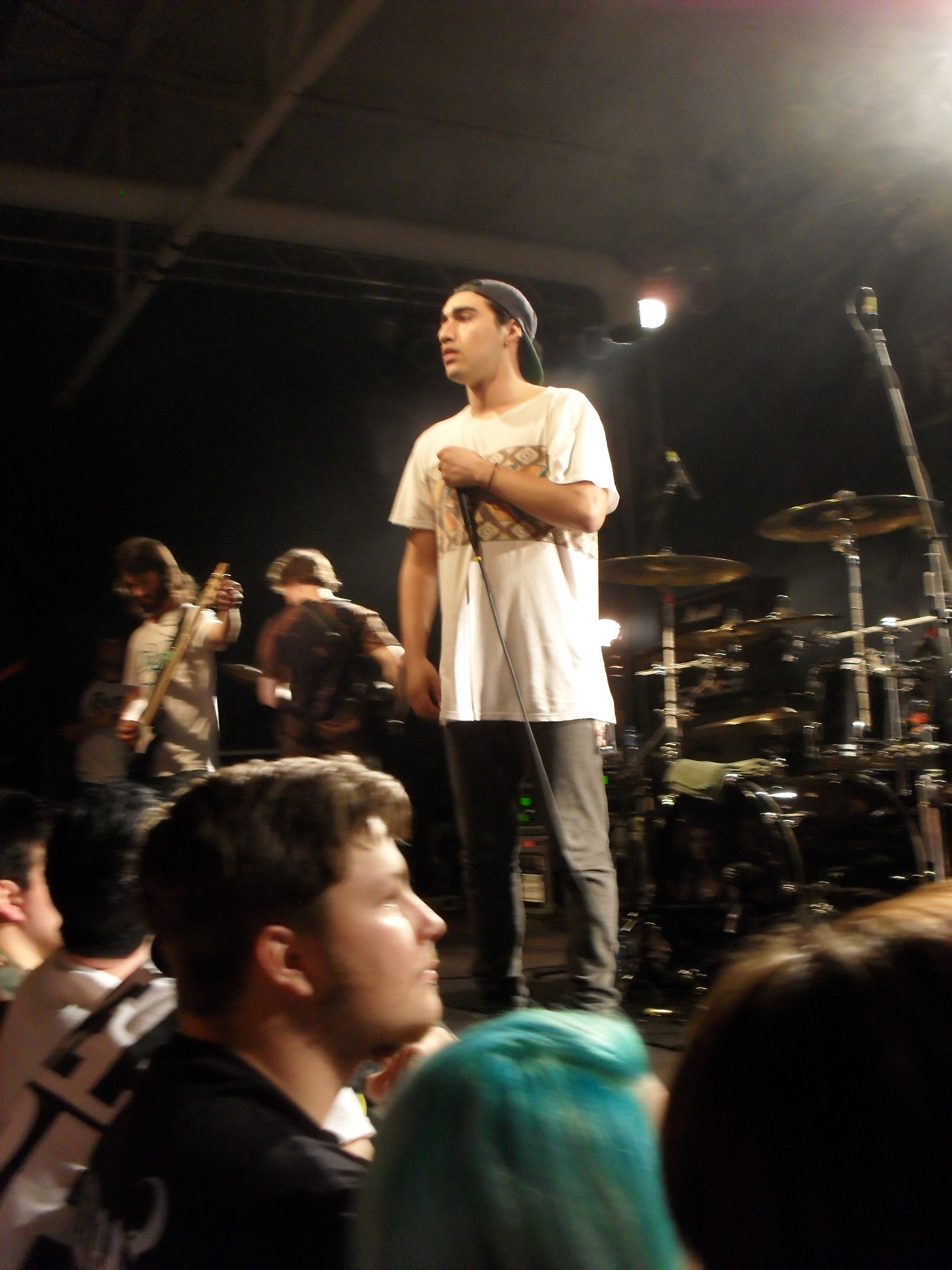
Founding vocalist Adrian Fitipaldes performing in Cologne in October 2013

In January 2013, the band completed a tour across regional Australia with In Hearts Wake and Endless Heights as supporting acts, in support of their new single "Worldeater". They also played in Adelaide at The Cavern to make up for their missed flight the previous month. In most shows the band leaked a new song titled "Masquerade". Northlane played at the 2013 Soundwave festival and Pushover 2013 alongside other Australian metal acts such as Thy Art Is Murder, The Amity Affliction and In Hearts Wake.

A music video for the song "Quantum Flux" from Singularity was released on 22 February 2013. It achieved mainstream success, debuting at #14 on the ARIA Australian Artists Top 20 Singles Chart in the week of 4 March 2013. On 22 March 2013, Northlane released their second studio album, Singularity, which debuted at No. 3 on the ARIA Albums Chart. It went to #1 in the Australian iTunes albums chart. Singularity received critical acclaim around the world. It was nominated for Triple J's "J Award Album of the Year" as one of the 10 best albums of 2013, and was voted as the Best album of 2013 on both The Racket and Short Fast Loud. In the Blunt Magazine readers poll, Northlane took home a multitude of awards in 2013 including "Band of the Year", "Album of the Year" and "Best Vocalist". iTunes Australia nominated Singularity as one of the most notable albums of 2013.

The Singularity tour in Australia included Structures, Stray from the Path and Statues. In August they supported Karnivool around Australia.

Northlane made their United States touring debut in November 2013, touring nationally with Veil of Maya and Structures. In January 2014, they played on the Big Day Out touring festival, before touring the US with Bring Me the Horizon, Of Mice & Men and Issues on the American Dream tour. In March and April they supported Architects on a 39 date tour of Europe and the UK.

On 9 May 2014, the band released the deluxe edition of Singularity, which included an instrumental edition of the album.

Northlane announced that they would curate their own festival called FREE YOUR MIND, with the first tour taking place in May 2014 in Australia. Northlane headlined the festival with support from Thy Art Is Murder, Veil of Maya, Volumes and Make Them Suffer. All dates on the tour sold out in advance. Northlane appeared on the cover of Blunt Magazine in the April edition prior to Free Your Mind. It was after this tour that Northlane became activists and heavily supported many charities including The Smith Family by donating used drums sticks and guitars.

It was announced in September 2014 that founding vocalist Adrian Fitipaldes would be leaving the band. Northlane issued a statement via their Facebook page, citing an impact on Fitipaldes' health as the catalyst. Northlane also announced that they will be accepting audition videos for a new vocalist.

=== 2014–2016: Arrival of Marcus Bridge and Node ===
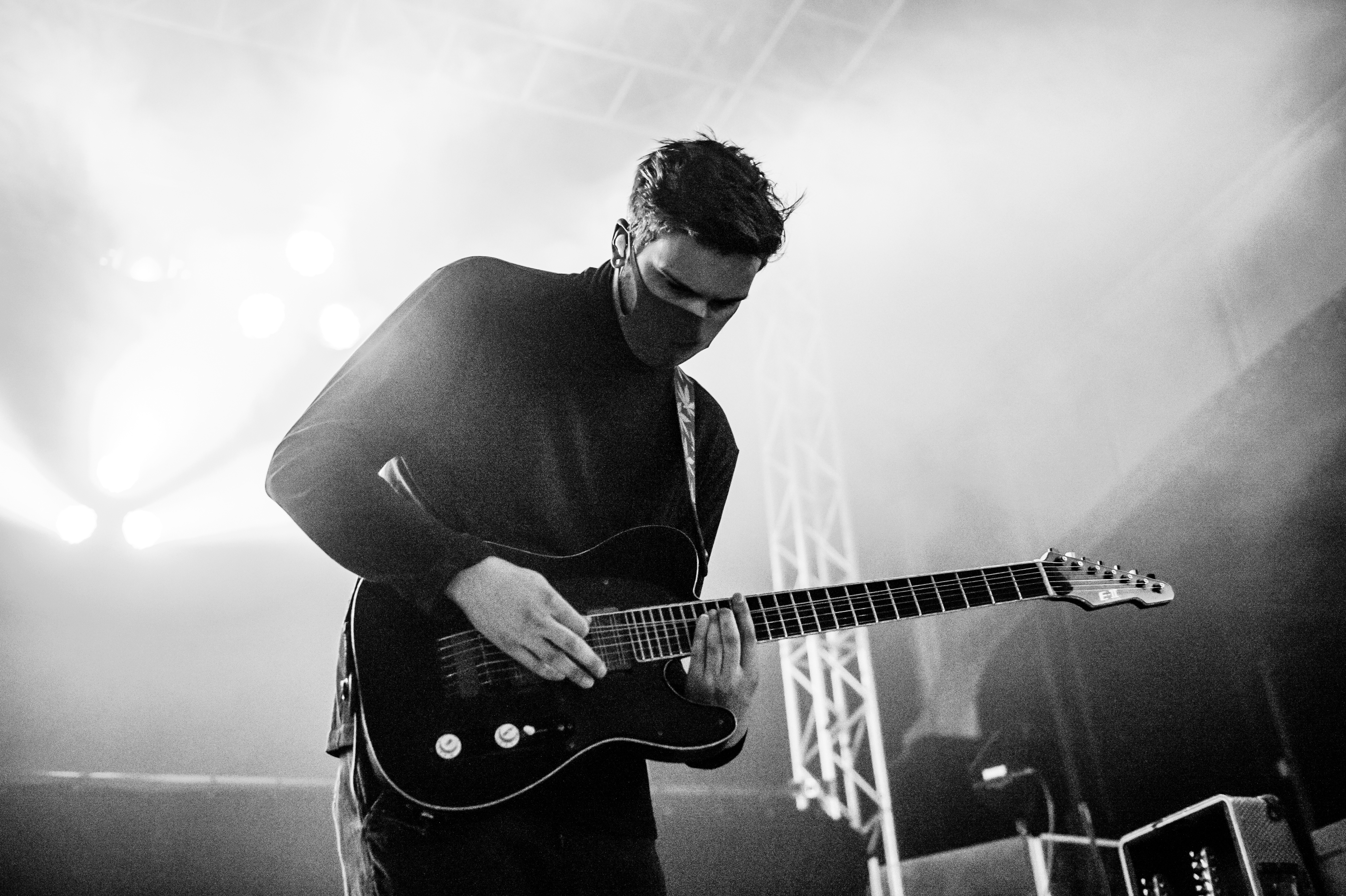
Lead guitarist Jon Deiley performing in 2016

On 14 October, Northlane announced that they had found their new vocalist. Describing the new single as "one of the heaviest Northlane tracks ever", the band released the song "Rot" on 20 November and digitally on 28 November, with the new vocalist being revealed as Marcus Bridge. The song would later appear on the band's upcoming album.

Their third studio album, Node, and first with new vocalist Marcus Bridge, was released on 24 July 2015, with Will Putney producing, which reached No. 1.

At the ARIA Music Awards of 2015, Node won the Best Hard Rock or Heavy Metal Album category.

=== 2016–2018: Equinox, Mesmer and Analog Future ===
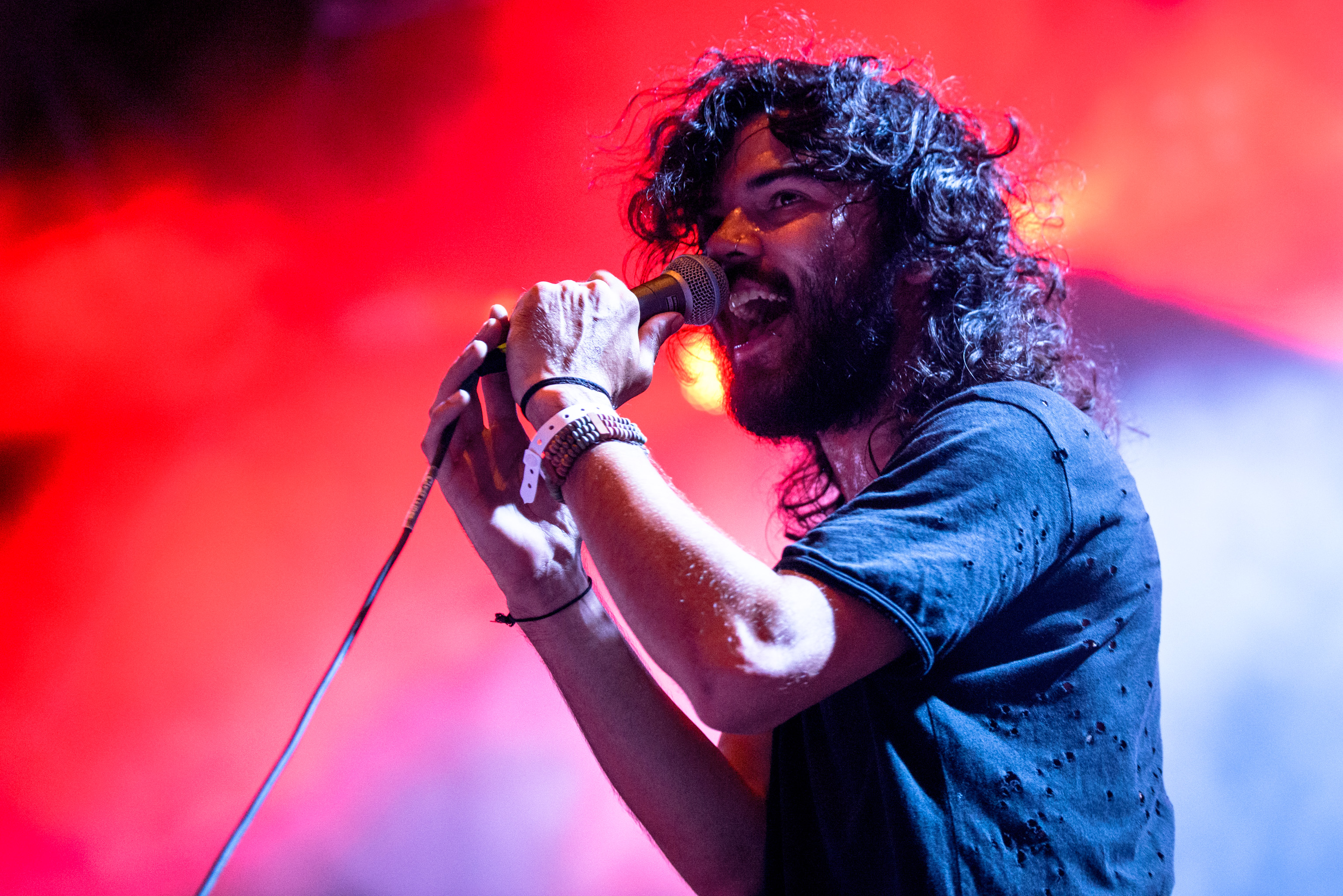
Current vocalist Marcus Bridge performing at Impericon Festival 2016 in Oberhausen

On 19 April 2016, the band announced that they had been working on a collaborative release with In Hearts Wake entitled Equinox. It was recorded in secret that January in Melbourne with producer Will Putney. The EP features three songs: "Refuge", "Equinox" and "Hologram" and was released on 20 April, through UNFD. To promote the EP, Northlane and in Hearts Wake co-headlined a tour in June. Supporting them were Hands Like Houses and Ocean Grove. From 23 April–7 May, Northlane played performed at Impericon Festival 2016 in Oberhausen, Germany.

Since early 2016, the band's live show and costumes have evolved. Jon has worn an array of masks, including an anti-pollution mask, a black medical mask and a rhinestone covered mask which conceals his entire head, plus a pair of large black contact lenses. Alex wears a long wrap-around jacket he acquired while in Japan. Nic wears a black singlet and medical mask. Josh wears a white long sleeve and Marcus wears a moth eaten black t-shirt with bandages on his hands.

On 9 September 2016, the band released the deluxe edition of Node, which included an instrumental edition of the album, two tracks from the Ghost City Sessions live performance, a version of "Aspire" with Marcus Bridge, a cover, and the original single version of "Rot".

The band premiered a new track "Intuition" at Unify Gathering in January 2017, which was eventually released on 17 January 2017. Northlane announced an Australian tour in support of the single in March 2017.

On 10 March, Northlane released a single "Mesmer", an ambient electronic track with an accompanying music video which was shot by Jason Eshraghian in Sydney and contains artistic shots of the band and scenic views. Along with this, a chatbot appeared on Northlane's Facebook page: called "Citizen", people could interact with the chatbot on Facebook Messenger where the bot would give cryptic messages and clues to upcoming releases.

On 16 March, all of Northlane's social media profile pictures turned white, and led fans to an easter egg website, nl6633.com via small text in the white images. This website contained a landing page which showed timelapsed videos of members of Northlane in a recording studio, however no additional information was given.

Two months after "Intuition" was released, another single, titled "Citizen", was released, on 20 March. On 24 March, Northlane released their fourth studio album Mesmer without any prior warning, and the album was made available for immediate purchase and streaming. The aforementioned single "Mesmer" was discovered to be an album sampler/trailer, containing stems to all of the tracks on the album. Additional details about the album's release were given by Northlane's record label UNFD, revealing that clues about the album had been released as early as 2016, and the release date was hidden in the band's Facebook cover image.

Mesmer debuted at #3 on the ARIA Charts, the third Northlane release in a row to debut in the top 5 in Australia.

On 1 June, Northlane took part in a Twitter Blueroom session, where their new music video for "Solar" was premiered. The music video was released shortly before the band began their Mesmer World Tour, with the first leg featuring performances on the main stage at Download Festival, several other European festivals, as well as tours in Canada and South America. Northlane have also announced additional tours in Australia and Europe for 2017.

After their Mesmer World Tour, the band announced that their first live album titled Analog Future is set for release on 16 March 2018, and they also announced that the album had a limited edition vinyl release of only 500 copies. The first and only single from the live album, "Citizen (Live in Melbourne)" was recorded on 20 October 2017 and released on 6 February. On 13 February, the band announced the track listing of the album.

=== 2018–2020: Milovic's departure, Alien and Negative Energy ===
On 12 July 2018, the band released a new single, titled "Vultures". The song would eventually later appear on the band's next album. On 6 September, the band announced that bassist Alex Milovic would be leaving the band for personal reasons.

On 2 November, former Structures guitarist and vocalist Brendon Padjasek has been confirmed on taking over bass duties as well as additional vocals for the band. A month later, Padjasek would later join the band playing at the inaugural Good Things festival, where the band unveiled a new song titled "Talking Heads" that was later confirmed to appear on their fifth studio album in 2019.

On 30 December, the band confirmed via their Twitter that they were finishing writing their fifth studio album. On 7 January 2019, they commenced recording the new album.

On 8 February, the band released the deluxe edition of Mesmer, which included an instrumental edition of the album.

On 9 February, Northlane tweeted a video with small text reading "Rift" in it, which is the name of one of the tracks on the album. A day later, they confirmed they had finished recording the album. On 5 April, Northlane featured on PhaseOne's single "Crash & Burn", later included in his debut album Transcendency.

On 12 April, the band released a leak of the album, showing its title, release date, artwork and tracklist. Their upcoming fifth album titled Alien is set for release on 2 August 2019. A few days later, the band released another leak, suggesting that they are planning to release three more singles: "Bloodline" on 30 April, "Talking Heads" on 13 June and "Eclipse" on 25 July.

On 30 April, the band released their first single and music video for "Bloodline" which was based upon frontman Marcus Bridge's violent upbringing. The band also stated their new album will be their most personal to date. A world tour was also announced on the back of their new album Alien.

On 3 June, the band announced that their second single "Talking Heads" will be released much earlier than the assumed release date. A few days later, the label released a teaser of the single with an official release date on 5 June. Along with the release of the single, the band announced a new show for their National Tour for Melbourne after the first one completely sold out. VIP tickets were also announced, where fans could upgrade their standard tickets for VIP ones.

On 29 July, the band released their third single "Eclipse", which was originally scheduled for release much more earlier than the current release date. The single was released along with an accompanying music video. The album was then released on the set date, and a week later peaked at No. 3 on the ARIA Charts. On 31 October, Northlane covered The Vines' single "Get Free" for Triple J's Like a Version.

In March 2020, the band released Negative Energy, a raw and revealing documentary around the album's writing and recording process. On 20 May, the band released a new single titled "Enemy of the Night" and also announced that the deluxe edition of Alien is set for release on 31 July 2020, which contains the bonus track "Enemy of the Night" and an instrumental edition of the album. A double LP neon pink vinyl will be released, limited to unknown amount of physical copies worldwide, and it will be later made available digitally for streaming and download.

=== 2020–2021: Live at the Roundhouse ===
On 28 August 2020, the band released their second live album titled Live at the Roundhouse, a 14-track release that is out on streaming platforms and sees the band performing the first and biggest leg of the national tour, drawing generously from the Alien tracklist. It captures their hometown show at the Roundhouse last October while touring their most recent album, Alien. Earlier that month, the band broadcast the concert footage in full as part of a pay-per-view livestream event, giving fans a chance to witness the intense, sold-out show from the comfort of their own homes.

On 15 February 2021, Live at the Roundhouse was made available to stream on YouTube, due to the show being pirated on the internet. On 21 February, the band announced a five-track remix EP, entitled 5G. The EP, set for release on 26 February 2021, features remixes of tracks primarily lifted from their 2019 album Alien. The sole exception to this is a remix of "Ohm", which comes from the band's 2015 album Node.

=== 2021–2022: Padjasek's departure and Obsidian ===
On 18 March 2021, the band released the single "Clockwork" along with an accompanying music video. The single has been chosen as the official theme song for the video game Tom Clancy's Rainbow Six Siege at 2021's Oceanic Nationals eSports League. On the same day, they also announced that bassist Brendon Padjasek departed from the band in order to focus on his home life, with the group intending to continue on as a quartet for the time being, with Jon Deiley handling bass duties since. On 19 April, the band confirmed that they had begun recording their sixth album.

On 10 May, the band announced another five-track EP, entitled 2D. The EP, set for release on 21 May 2021, features acoustic versions of tracks primarily lifted from their 2019 album Alien. Vocalist Marcus Bridge explains how 2D adds another dimension to these tracks: "Recording an acoustic EP is something that we've wanted to do for quite some time and felt right with the personal nature of the songs from Alien. I wanted to strip these songs back to the bare minimum to juxtapose the soundscapes of the album, a 2D version of sorts. A song like 'Rift' has a completely different energy in this context and took on new meaning with the recording in the depths of lockdown, now almost feeling like a cry of frustration and despair." On 10 June, the band announced that they have finished recording the sixth album.

On 10 November, the band officially released "Echo Chamber", the lead single from their sixth studio album, Obsidian, which was released on 22 April 2022, along with its music video. At the same time, the band revealed the album cover and the track list. To promote the album, the band also announced their upcoming Australia tour which will start in June 2022 with Plini, Sleep Token and ALT as supports. On 27 January 2022, the band unveiled the third single "Plenty". On 20 February, due to the ongoing supply chain issues, the band announced that they pushed the release of the album from the original release date of 1 April back to 22 April. On 23 March, one month before the album release, the band released the fourth single "Carbonized" and its corresponding music video. A deluxe version of Obsidian, featuring instrumental versions of the tracks, followed on 11 November.

=== 2023–present: Node: Reloaded and Anemoia ===
On 20 November 2023, Northlane released the song, "Dante". On 23 January 2024, the band unveiled the song "Miasma" featuring Winston McCall of Parkway Drive. At the same time, they announced that their fifth EP, Mirror's Edge, would be released on 12 April 2024. On 6 March, one month before the EP release, the band premiered the song "Afterimage" featuring Ian Kenny of Karnivool and Birds of Tokyo.

On 14 November 2024, it was announced that Northlane would be contributing to the soundtrack of Fretless – The Wrath of Riffson, a video game produced by Rob Scallon.

On 9 October 2025, the band announced the release of a remixed, remastered and partly re-recorded version of Node, named Node: Reloaded, for its 10th anniversary.

On 27 April 2026, the band released the single "Evian". On 4 August 2026, the band announced their upcoming seventh album Anemoia, scheduled to be released on 30 October 2026. Along with the announcement, the album's second single, "Cut_it", was released. The album's third single, "Crucified", was released on 22 September 2026. On 20 October 2026, the band announced the release date of Anemoia had been delayed to 27 November 2026, and also released a new single called "Deathwish".

== Musical style ==
Northlane's musical style has mainly been described as metalcore and progressive metalcore, as well as djent, alternative metal, industrial metal, progressive metal, and alternative rock. The band's debut album and their second album, Singularity, have been considered as the typical prog metalcore albums comparable with the work of After the Burial and Born of Osiris, and to contain elements of post hardcore. With the change of a new vocalist, their third album, Node, incorporated a lot more alternative and experimental elements into their sound, with a Wall of Sound review describing the album's style as a mixture of progressive metal and alternative metal. Their fourth album, Mesmer, saw them embracing the alternative and experimental sounds heard from Node with the album taking influence from early-2010s progressive metal and alternative metal bands. Since their fifth album, Alien, they have blended their progressive metalcore style with elements of nu metal, industrial metal and Electronic dance music (EDM).

== Band members ==
Current

- Jon Deiley – lead guitar (2009–present), programming, drum pads (2009–2010, 2016–present), bass (2021–present), drums, percussion (2009–2010)
- Josh Smith – rhythm guitar (2009–present), backing vocals (2024–present)
- Nic Pettersen – drums, percussion (2010–present)
- Marcus Bridge – lead vocals (2014–present)

Former

- Brendan Derby – drums, percussion (2009)
- Mitchell Collier – drums, percussion (2010)
- Simon Anderson – bass (2009–2011) (Note: Simon Anderson performed on the band's debut album, although he was no longer in the band by the time of its release.)
- Adrian Fitipaldes – lead vocals (2009–2014)
- Alex Milovic – bass (2009, 2011–2018)
- Brendon Padjasek – bass, backing vocals (2018–2021)

== Discography ==
Studio albums

- Discoveries (2011)
- Singularity (2013)
- Node (2015)
- Mesmer (2017)
- Alien (2019)
- Obsidian (2022)
- Anemoia (2026)

== Awards and nominations ==
=== AIR Awards ===
The Australian Independent Record Awards (commonly known informally as AIR Awards) is an annual awards night to recognise, promote and celebrate the success of Australia's Independent Music sector.

Year	Nominee / work	Award	Result	Ref.
2015	Node	Best Independent Hard Rock, Heavy or Punk Album	Nominated	
2018	Mesmer	Best Independent Hard Rock, Heavy or Punk Album	Nominated	
2020	Alien	Best Independent Heavy Album or EP	Won	
2023	Obsidian	Independent Album of the Year	Nominated	
2023	Obsidian	Best Independent Heavy Album or EP	Won	
2025	Mirror's Edge	Best Independent Heavy Album or EP	Nominated	

=== APRA Music Awards ===
The APRA Music Awards were established by Australasian Performing Right Association (APRA) in 1982 to honour the achievements of songwriters and music composers, and to recognise their song writing skills, sales and airplay performance, by its members annually.

Year	Nominee / work	Award	Result	Ref.
2025	"Dante"	Most Performed Hard Rock / Heavy Metal Work	Nominated	

=== ARIA Music Awards ===
The ARIA Music Awards is an annual awards ceremony that recognises excellence, innovation, and achievement across all genres of Australian music. They commenced in 1987.

Year	Nominee / work	Award	Result	Ref.
2013	Singularity	Best Hard Rock or Heavy Metal Album	Nominated	
2015	Node	Best Hard Rock or Heavy Metal Album	Won	
2017	Mesmer	Best Hard Rock or Heavy Metal Album	Won	
2019	Alien	Best Hard Rock or Heavy Metal Album	Won	
2022	Obsidian	Best Hard Rock or Heavy Metal Album	Nominated	

=== Heavy Music Awards ===
Year	Nominee / work	Award	Result	Ref.
2018	Mesmer	Best Artwork	Nominated	

=== J Awards ===
The J Awards are an annual series of Australian music awards that were established by the Australian Broadcasting Corporation's youth-focused radio station Triple J. They commenced in 2005.

Year	Nominee / work	Award	Result	Ref.
2013	Singularity	Australian Album of the Year	Nominated	
2019	Alien	Australian Album of the Year	Nominated	
2022	Obsidian	Australian Album of the Year	Nominated	

=== National Live Music Awards ===
The National Live Music Awards (NLMAs) are a broad recognition of Australia's diverse live industry, celebrating the success of the Australian live scene. The awards commenced in 2016.

Year	Nominee / work	Award	Result	Ref.
2016	Northlane	Live Hard Rock Act of the Year	Nominated	
2019	Northlane	Live Hard Rock Act of the Year	Nominated	
