= Singularity (Northlane album) =

Studio album by Northlane
- Released: 22 March 2013
- Studio: The Machine Shop, Belleville, New Jersey, U.S.
- Genre: Metalcore, progressive metal
- Length: 34:50
- Label: UNFD; Distort; Rise
- Producer: Will Putney

Northlane chronology
Discoveries (2011)	Singularity (2013)	Node (2015)

Singles from Singularity
- 1. "Worldeater" Released: 13 December 2012; 2. "Quantum Flux" Released: 21 February 2013; 3. "Masquerade" Released: 20 March 2013

Singularity is the second studio album by Australian metalcore band Northlane. It was released on 22 March 2013 through UNFD and Distort. This is the last album to feature vocalist Adrian Fitipaldes before his departure in September 2014. It was produced by Will Putney and recorded at The Machine Shop in Belleville, New Jersey.

In 2014, a deluxe edition of Singularity was released, which contains instrumental versions of all songs.

At the J Awards of 2013, the album was nominated for Australian Album of the Year.

== Background ==
After much speculation over the ambiguous viral campaign centered on singularity2013.com, many news sites were reporting the possibility of the music group We Are Unified running a new roster based festival. The website functioned simply as a countdown but had many acts signed to We Are Unified posting online about it. When the countdown hit midnight on the morning of 21 February 2013, it was revealed that Singularity was in fact the title of the next album from the Sydney band.

The viral campaign created such hype for the project that fans were cracking the code of track listings hidden in a series of invisible cubes placed around the singularity2013.com website and decoding details on the LP written in binary code on a magazine advert.

== Critical reception ==
Professional ratings
Review scores
Source	Rating
Already Heard	4/5 stars
KillYourStereo	85/100
Rock Sound	8/10
TMHTimes	10/10 stars
Triple J	9/10 stars

The album has received positive reviews from critics. Hannah Gillicker from Already Heard gave the album 4 out of 5, saying: "Northlane have confirmed at least one thing with Singularity and that's that they know how to craft a bloody good record. Totalling at 10 tracks, there's little to criticise here and the band are definitely playing their cards right." KillYourStereo gave it 85 out of 100 and said: "In a harsh manner of speaking, Singularity isn't necessarily ground breaking, but the album takes a style with current and strong appeal and puts its own spin on things. The charm here is that Northlane promote positivity and ambition. They are doing something they love and the results match. This is an inspiring record in so many ways. Musically evolved and emotionally diverse." Rock Sound rated the album 8 out of 10 and said: "With Singularity, Northlane have created a familiar but also fresh and engrossing record, showcasing true progress and growth as a band. At times it's a tad repetitive, but that only serves to stop the album being something truly special."

== Track listing ==
All tracks are written by Adrian Fitipaldes and Jon Deiley.

No.	Title	Length
1.	"Genesis"	1:36
2.	"Scarab"	3:07
3.	"Windbreaker"	3:44
4.	"Worldeater"	3:50
5.	"Quantum Flux"	3:59
6.	"Dream Awake"	4:17
7.	"The Calling"	3:12
8.	"Masquerade" (featuring Drew York of Stray from the Path)	3:33
9.	"Singularity"	3:46
10.	"Aspire"	3:46
Total length:		34:50

Deluxe edition bonus tracks
No.	Title	Length
1.	"Genesis" (instrumental)	1:36
2.	"Scarab" (instrumental)	3:07
3.	"Windbreaker" (instrumental)	3:44
4.	"Worldeater" (instrumental)	3:50
5.	"Quantum Flux" (instrumental)	3:59
6.	"Dream Awake" (instrumental)	4:17
7.	"The Calling" (instrumental)	3:12
8.	"Masquerade" (instrumental)	3:33
9.	"Singularity" (instrumental)	3:46
10.	"Aspire" (instrumental)	3:46
Total length:		34:50

== Personnel ==
Credits for Singularity adapted from AllMusic.

=== Northlane ===
- Adrian Fitipaldes – lead vocals, composition, lyrics
- Jon Deiley – guitars, composition
- Josh Smith – guitars
- Alex Milovic – bass
- Nic Pettersen – drums, percussion

=== Additional musicians ===
- Drew York of Stray from the Path – guest vocals on track 8, "Masquerade"
- Terence McKenna – spoken word on track 9, "Singularity"

=== Additional personnel ===
- Will Putney – engineering, mastering, mixing, production
- Randy Leboeuf – engineering
- Zakk Cervini and Alberto de Icaza – editing
- Luke Logemann – A&R
- Pat Fox – art direction, design
- Ben Clement – photography

== Charts ==
Chart performance for Singularity
Chart (2013)	Peak positions
Australian Albums (ARIA)	3
