= Node (album) =

Studio album by Northlane
- Released: 24 July 2015
- Studios: Graphic Nature Audio, Belleville, New Jersey, U.S.
- Genres: Metalcore; progressive metal; alternative metal
- Length: 46:21
- Labels: UNFD; Distort; Rise; New Damage
- Producer: Will Putney

Northlane chronology
Singularity (2013)	Node (2015)	Equinox (2016)

Singles from Node
- 1. "Rot" Released: 28 November 2014; 2. "Obelisk" Released: 7 June 2015; 3. "Impulse" Released: 27 July 2015; 4. "Weightless" Released: 8 April 2016

Deluxe edition cover
- Artwork used for the deluxe edition cover

Node is the third studio album by Australian heavy metal band Northlane. It was released on 24 July 2015 through UNFD and Rise. It was produced by Will Putney and recorded at Graphic Nature Audio in Belleville, New Jersey. This is the first album to feature vocalist Marcus Bridge after the departure of Adrian Fitipaldes in 2014. It also marks the group's first slight departure from their heavier metalcore roots and towards a more alternative and experimental sound.

In 2016, a deluxe edition of Node was released, which contains instrumental versions of all songs, two new songs, a version of the song "Aspire" featuring Marcus' vocals, and the single version of the song "Rot".

In 2025, a remixed/remastered and partly re-recorded version of the album, dubbed Node: Reloaded, was released, marking the 10th anniversary of the original record.

== Release and promotion ==
The band released two promotional singles, "Ra" and "Leech" respectively. "Ra" was handed out to fans as a free-download gift for supporting the band. "Leech" was released as a promotional single after the band began an interactive puzzle with clips of the song, combining all of the pieces together will create the song in its full length. "Rot", which was previously released in November 2014 as a single, was re-recorded for the release of Node.

== Critical reception ==
Professional ratings
Review scores
Source	Rating
Distorted Sound	8/10
Exclaim!	7/10
KillYourStereo	60/100
Louder Sound	3.5/5 stars
Sputnikmusic	4/5 stars
Wall of Sound	8.5/10

The album received mostly positive reviews, but also mixed reviews from several critics. Distorted Sound scored the album 8 out of 10 and stated: "Node is a phenomenal display of Northlane's ability to restructure and rediscover, a solid album that is recommended for both prog and metalcore fans alike. Bridge has clearly melted into the boiling pot of talent that are Northlane, stepped up to the plate and proven that he has what it takes to join such a well established band." Exclaim! gave it 7 out of 10 and said: "It's a bold new direction for a group with youth on their side that, while potentially divisive, points towards a bright future." Alex Sievers from KillYourStereo gave the album 60 out of 100 and said: "For a lot of punters, Node is easily one of the most anticipated heavy releases of the year [...] yet I feel that Node has been a victim of that very same hype. While it hasn't quite crashed and burned, like say, Watch Dogs or like the new Star Wars movie will [...] it's definitely taken a fair few hits from such expectations. This album really is an awkward transitional stage for what Northlane could become musically and stylistically, and who knows, that may very well be amazing come the next record. But at this current stage in their musical metamorphosis, there’s an inconsistent level of quality and a lacking in real sonic impact. Which is a just goddamn shame." Dom Lawson of Louder Sound gave the album 3.5 out 5, saying: "Node is a strong step in the right direction and a testament to this band's fighting spirit." Wall of Sound rated the album 8.5 out of 10 and said: "All in all, the album is a great representation of how far this band from Sydney has come in the short amount of time they've been together and its a true indication of why the international fans are loving them too."

== Track listing ==
All tracks are written by Marcus Bridge, Jon Deiley, Josh Smith and Will Putney, except where noted

No.	Title	Writer(s)	Length
1.	"Soma"		4:02
2.	"Obelisk"		4:14
3.	"Node"		4:42
4.	"Ohm"		4:07
5.	"Nameless"	Smith	2:19
6.	"Rot"	Bridge, Deiley, Smith, Nic Pettersen	3:53
7.	"Leech"		4:21
8.	"Impulse"		3:35
9.	"Weightless"		5:15
10.	"Ra"		4:27
11.	"Animate"		5:24
Total length:			46:21

Deluxe edition bonus tracks
No.	Title	Length
12.	"Soma" (instrumental)	4:04
13.	"Obelisk" (instrumental)	4:14
14.	"Node" (instrumental)	4:43
15.	"Ohm" (instrumental)	4:12
16.	"Nameless" (instrumental)	2:26
17.	"Rot" (instrumental)	3:54
18.	"Leech" (instrumental)	4:21
19.	"Impulse" (instrumental)	3:37
20.	"Weightless" (instrumental)	5:18
21.	"Ra" (instrumental)	4:29
22.	"Animate" (instrumental)	5:27
23.	"Obelisk" (Ghost City Sessions)	4:34
24.	"Weightless" (Ghost City Sessions)	5:20
25.	"Aspire" (newly recorded version)	3:39
26.	"Let It Happen" (Tame Impala cover)	4:10
27.	"Rot" (version 2)	3:54
Total length:		01:07:58

== Personnel ==
Credits for Node adapted from AllMusic.

Northlane

- Marcus Bridge – lead vocals
- Jon Deiley – guitars, composition
- Joshua Smith – guitars, composition
- Alex Milovic – bass
- Nic Pettersen – drums, percussion

Additional personnel

- Will Putney – production, engineering, mixing, mastering
- Randy Leboeuf – engineering
- Steve Seid – additional audio engineering
- Tom Smith Jr. – editing
- Luke Logemann – A&R, management
- Adam Sylvester, Marco Walzel and Tom Johannessen – booking
- Patrick Galvin – artwork, design

== Charts ==
Chart performance for Node
Chart (2015)	Peak position
Australian Albums (ARIA)	1
UK Albums (Official Charts)	92
UK Independent Albums (OCC)	13
UK Rock & Metal Albums (OCC)	9
US Billboard 200	195
US Heatseekers Albums (Billboard)	2
