= Discoveries (Northlane album) =

Studio album by Northlane
- Released: 11 November 2011
- Studio: Electric Sun Studios, Arndell Park, New South Wales, Australia
- Genre: Metalcore, progressive metal
- Length: 41:11
- Label: UNFD; Distort
- Producer: Shane Edwards; Dave Petrovic

Northlane chronology
Hollow Existence (2010)	Discoveries (2011)	Singularity (2013)

Discoveries is the debut studio album by Australian metalcore band Northlane. It was released on 11 November 2011 through UNFD. It was produced by Shane Edwards and Dave Petrovic, and recorded at Electric Sun Studios in Arndell Park. It is the only album to feature their second bassist Simon Anderson before he was "fired" from the band.

== Background ==
The cube featured on the album art is a "printed out, and origami folded, edited image from the Hubble Space Telescope".

== Promotion ==
To promote their debut studio album, Northlane performed an 18-date national tour. They performed in Sydney twice, Gold Coast, Brisbane, Nambour, Port Macquarie, Newcastle twice, Dubbo, Central Coast, Werribee, Melbourne twice, Bendigo, Warrnambool, Mount Gambier, Adelaide, and Geelong.

== Critical reception ==
Professional ratings
Review scores
Source	Rating
KillYourStereo	90/100
Loud	88/100

The album received generally favourable reviews. KillYourStereo called it the best Australian album of 2011. Sam Radojcin of Loud, praised the band's unique take on the progressive genre, and claimed they had potential.

== Track listing ==
No.	Title	Length
1.	"Dispossession"	3:43
2.	"Abrasumente"	4:04
3.	"Comatose"	4:13
4.	"Transcending Dimensions"	3:43
5.	"Discoveries"	4:56
6.	"Corruption"	3:54
7.	"Exposure"	3:41
8.	"Metamorphosis" (re-recorded version; original version from Hollow Existence)	4:38
9.	"Solitude"	3:23
10.	"I Shook Hands with Death"	4:56
Total length:		41:11

Notes

- "I Shook Hands with Death" is printed as "Ishookhandswithdeath" on physical releases.

== Personnel ==
Northlane

- Adrian Fitipaldes – lead vocals
- Jon Deiley – guitars
- Josh Smith – guitars
- Simon Anderson – bass
- Nic Pettersen – drums, percussion

Additional personnel

- Shane Edwards – production, engineering
- Dave Petrovic – production, engineering
- Will Putney – mixing, mastering

== Chart performance ==
Chart (2011)	Peak position
Australian ARIA Chart	85
