= Disturbia =

Disturbia, a portmanteau of disturbed and suburbia, may refer to:

- Disturbia (film), a 2007 film starring Shia LaBeouf and its musical works:
  - Disturbia: Original Motion Picture Soundtrack
  - Disturbia: Original Motion Picture Score
- "Disturbia" (song), a 2008 song by Rihanna
- Disturbia (EP), a 2017 EP by Void of Vision
- Disturbia, a 1997 novel by Christopher Fowler
