= Beans (rapper) =

American rapper

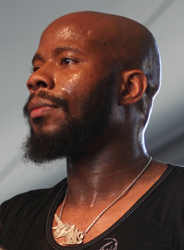
- Beans performing at Coachella in 2005

Background information
- Also known as: Mr. Ballbeam
- Born: Robert Edward Stewart II; July 3, 1971 (age 55)
- Origin: White Plains, New York, U.S.
- Genres: Underground hip hop
- Occupations: Rapper, producer
- Instruments: Vocals, Moog synthesizer, programmed percussion
- Years active: 1996–present
- Labels: Anticon, Warp, Thirsty Ear, Adored and Exploited, Tygr Rawwk Rcrds, a night on canopy
- Website: tygrrawwkrcrds.com

Robert Edward Stewart II, also known as Beans (born July 3, 1971), is an American rapper. He was a member of the underground hip hop group Antipop Consortium. He is a founder of the record label Tygr Rawwk Rcrds.

== Style ==
With his distinctive, fast-flowing and poetic style, Beans amalgamates witty, thoughtful lyrics with his own productions of "Chunky psychedelic electro-hop." According to the Pitchfork Media review for the album Thorns, "The MC is simply good at what he's good at, putting together bushy, crooked beats with rhymes that are both confessional and evasive."

== History ==
Beans has released two LPs and one EP on AntiPop Consortium's former label Warp Records since launching his solo career in 2003: Tomorrow Right Now, Now Soon Someday EP and Shock City Maverick. The third solo album Only was released on Thirsty Ear Recordings in 2005, followed by the fourth album Thorns on Adored And Exploited in 2007

In 2011, Beans released the fifth solo album, End It All. on Anticon. It features productions by Four Tet, Sam Fogarino of Interpol, Clark, Tobacco, Fred Bigot, Nobody, Son Lux, Ade Firth, In Flagranti, and The Bumps.

Beans has collaborated with Vernon Reid of Living Colour, Kool A.D., Ghislain Poirier, Arto Lindsay, Alec Empire, Funkstörung, Holy Fuck, Evil Nine, DJ Shadow among others.

In 2013, Beans collaborated with Ghostly International recording artist, Mux Mool, under the name, Knifefight. The duo recorded a 6 track, cassette only release for Anticon.

In 2017, after a five-year hiatus and the completion of numerous simultaneous projects on his new imprint, Tygr Rawwk Rcrds, Beans has returned to the public eye with not one, but three new albums, as well as his first novel. Die Tonight, 174 pages of weird fiction, tells the story of Eric Ford, a teenage loner who gets possessed by a record, goes on a killing spree, and finds himself.

The first album of the music trilogy, Wolves of the World, features production from Canadian producer Toboggan. The second album, Love Me Tonight, features various producers such as Sam Fogarino from Interpol, Gobby, Laurel Halo, Container, Ben Chisholm (Chelsea Wolfe), Tobacco, and Pete Swanson. Love Me Tonight delves into love and all of its manifestations, both rewarding and costly.

Lastly, HAAST, the third album deals with social issues surrounding the increased unaccountability of violence towards Black America painted in a palette of expansive experimentation. The name, HAAST, derives from an extinct species of eagle that once lived on the South Island of New Zealand around 1400. This third album finds Beans working alongside Miami Schematic Music producer Ay Fast, industrial noise duo Snake ZVK, and string composer-arranger, [Christopher Auberbach-Brown. All three albums feature guest dynamic MCs, Elucid from Armand Hammer.

== Live performance ==
Beans has been known to perform in a wide variety of venues, from underground clubs in New York's East Village to festivals worldwide. In the past has taken to the stage armed with only a microphone and a portable CD player for his backing track, further reflecting the minimalist nature of his style. He has been recently performing and touring with That Kid Prolific.

Beans has performed on the same stage as acts as diverse as Radiohead, Prefuse 73, Public Enemy, Kool Keith, Edan, The Rapture, Missy Elliott, The Locust, Mike Ladd and Tortoise.

== Discography ==
=== Albums ===
- Tomorrow Right Now (Warp Records, 2003)
- Shock City Maverick (Warp, 2004)
- Only (Thirsty Ear Recordings, 2006) with William Parker and Hamid Drake
- Thorns (Adored and Exploited, 2007)
- End It All (Anticon, 2011)
- Wolves of the World (Tygr Rawwk Rcrds, 2017)
- Love Me Tonight (Tygr Rawwk Rcrds), 2017)
- HAAST (Tygr Rawwk Rcrds), 2017)
- Wolves of the World (a night on canopy, 2018) (Vinyl)
- Nibiru Tut (Hello.L.A./TYGR RAWWK RCRDS, 2018)
- Someday This Will All Be Ash (Hello.L.A./TYGR RAWWK RCRDS, 2018)
- Ace Balthazar (Hello.L.A./TYGR RAWWK RCRDS, 2019)
- Team BreakUP (Hello.L.A./TYGR RAWWK RCRDS, 2020)
- Venga (Hello.L.A./TYGR RAWWK RCRDS, 2020)
- ZWAARD (TYGR RAWWK RCRDS, 2024)

=== Extended plays ===
- Now Soon Someday (Warp, 2004)
- Nights Without Smiles (Hello.L.A., 2018)

=== Singles ===
- Nude Paper / Star Killer 12" (2000)
- Mutescreamer 7" (2003)
- Down By Law 12" (2004)

=== Antipop Consortium ===
- Tragic Epilogue (2000)
- Shopping Carts Crashing (2001)
- Arrhythmia (2002)
- Antipop vs. Matthew Shipp (2003) with Matthew Shipp
- Fluorescent Black (2009)

=== Remixes ===
- Walk The Line by Dani Siciliano on Walk The Line (2003)
- Final Day by Belle & Sebastian on Books (2004)

=== Productions ===
- Dystopian Disco Force "Vector" by Antipop Consortium on The Ends Against The Middle (2001)
- Ghostlawns by Antipop Consortium on Arrhythmia (2002)
- Toast on Juice CD Volume 28 (2003)
- A Knot In Your Bop with Antipop Consortium on Juice CD Volume 31 (2003)
- Shards Of Glass on Sound Of Hip Hop (2005)
- Dystopian Disco Force with Antipop Consortium on Toxic (2005)
- Cold As Hell by Ghislain Poirier on Breakupdown (2006)
- New Jack Exterminator by Antipop Consortium on Fluorescent Black (2009)

Knifefight

- Knifefight Ep Produced by Mux Mool

Book

- Die Tonight (2017)

Guest appearances

- CP Time "Signed Fictitious" by Vernon Reid on Mistaken Identity (1996)
- The Post Apocalypse Arkestra by Mike Ladd on Easy Listening 4 Armageddon (1997)
- 3ree (What Boundaries? remix) by Attica Blues on 3ree (1997)
- He Be The Poetry "Microphone Master" by Fini Dolo on Rise (1998)
- Homeo Stacies with Antipop Consortium on Chocolate Art (1998)
- Disorientation by Terranova on DJ-Kicks: Terranova (1998)
- Hydrogen Slush by The Isolationist on Hydrogen Slush (1998)
- Substance X by The Curse Of The Golden Vampire on The Curse of the Golden Vampire (1998)
- Substance X with The Curse Of The Golden Vampire on You've Got The Fucking Power (1999)
- Hydrogen Slush "Mechanic Robotic" "Lazer Tooth" "Insular Outcasts" by The Isolationist on The Isolationist (1999)
- Nude Paper with Antipop Consortium on #01 SPEX-CD (2000)
- St. Catherine St. by Deltron 3030 on Deltron 3030 (2000)
- Star Killer on The Art Of War: Who Dares Wins (2000)
- Quarterback Theme by The Infesticons on Gun Hill Road (2000)
- Glass Prism Enclosure by Techno Animal on The Brotherhood Of The Bomb (2001)
- Staple Nex "Broken Toenail Gland" by Bill Laswell on Points Of Order (2001)
- Salt by Funkstörung on Vice Versa (2001)
- Ponderosa on No Watches. No Maps (2001)
- Move Slow by New Flesh on Lie Low (2002)
- Move Slow by New Flesh on Understanding (2002)
- Superglitcher by Chris De Luca and Peabird on Deadly Wiz Da Disko (2002)
- Superglitcher by Orgasmic Le Toxicologue on Orgasmic Le Toxicologue Est Secrètement Amoureux De Vous (2002)
- Roar on Warp WIFOF2003 Mix (2003)
- Phreek The Beet on Advanced Listening Opportunity (2003)
- Mutescreamer on WarpVision: The Videos 1989-2004 (2004)
- Jaw Modulation by Headset on Spacesettings (2004)
- Vice Vanity by Sly and Robbie on Version Born (2004)
- Cold As Hell by Ghislain Poirier on Cold As Hell (2004)
- Mutescreamer (Prefuse 73 mix) on Margin (2004)
- Mutescreamer (Prefuse 73 mix) on Sónar 2004: Motors Running (2004)
- Morale Crusher by Prefuse 73 on Surrounded by Silence (2005)
- You're Dead, Let's Disco on The Thrill Of Colette (2005)
- Salt by Chocaholics on Top 40 Suicide/Hypodraulics (2005)
- I Am Metal by Graphic on I Am Metal (2005)
- Nite Eats Day (Money mix) by Dabrye on Additional Productions Vol. 1 (2005)
- New Thunder by Muallem on New Thunder/B About It (2005)
- New Thunder by Muallem on Frankie Splits (2006)
- New Thunder (The Emperor Machine vocal mix) by Muallem on Mutations 1 (2006)
- New Thunder (&Me mix) by Muallem on Mutations 2 (2006)
- Nite Eats Day by Dabrye on Two/Three (2006)
- Cold As Hell by Ghislain Poirier on Breakupdown (2006)
- Vice Vanity (Noiseshaper remix) by Noiseshaper on Real To Reel (2006)
- I Am Metal (Martyn's 3024 robot mix) by Graphic on I Am Metal/Heroine (2006)
- Mutescreamer (El-P remix) by DJ Food Stamp on El-P Essentials (2007)
- I Am Metal (Starkey remix) by Graphic/Darkstar on Starkey Remixes (2008)
- Mutescreamer by DJ Shadow on Essential Mix (2008)
- TV All Greasy by Tobacco on LA UTI (2010)
- Question Jam Answer by Kool A.D. on "63" (2013)
