= Intermission (Shigeto EP) =

EP by Shigeto
- Released: October 30, 2015
- Length: 22:39
- Label: Ghostly International
- Producer: Zachary Saginaw

Shigeto chronology
No Better Time Than Now (2013)	Intermission (2015)	The New Monday (2017)

Intermission is an EP by American record producer Zachary Shigeto Saginaw under the mononym Shigeto. It was released on October 30, 2015, through Ghostly International. It received generally favorable reviews from critics.

== Background ==
Zachary Shigeto Saginaw, better known under the mononym Shigeto, is an American record producer from Ann Arbor, Michigan. He released Full Circle (2010), Lineage (2012), and No Better Time Than Now (2013). Intermission consists of six tracks. It was released on October 30, 2015, through Ghostly International.

== Critical reception ==
Professional ratings
Aggregate scores
Source	Rating
Metacritic	71/100
Review scores
Source	Rating
AllMusic	3.5/5 stars
Drowned in Sound	7/10
Exclaim!	6/10
The Line of Best Fit	7.5/10
Resident Advisor	3.0/5

According to the review aggregator Metacritic, Intermission received "generally favorable reviews" based on a weighted average score of 71 out of 100 from 4 critic scores.

Andy Kellman of AllMusic wrote, "Though it might not be as substantial or as neatly tied together as No Better Time Than Now, the EP is easy to enjoy and full in form." Joe Goggins of Drowned in Sound described the EP as "a purer collection of ambient tracks than he's made to date" and added that "it suits him." Kit Macdonald of Resident Advisor stated, "With all of Intermission's variety, fans will likely find something to enjoy as they look forward to Saginaw relaxing into his next path."

== Track listing ==
All tracks are written by Zachary Saginaw.

Intermission track listing
No.	Title	Length
1.	"Pulse"	7:07
2.	"City Dweller"	3:46
3.	"Gently"	2:14
4.	"Do My Thing"	3:35
5.	"Deep Breathing"	1:51
6.	"Need Nobody"	4:03
Total length:		22:39

== Personnel ==
Credits adapted from liner notes.

- Zachary Saginaw – production, mixing
- Christopher Koltay – mixing
- Daddy Kev – mastering
- Michael Cina – artwork
