= Tragic Epilogue =

Studio album by Antipop Consortium
- Released: February 22, 2000
- Genre: Hip-hop
- Length: 55:11
- Label: 75 Ark
- Producers: High Priest; Beans; E. Blaize; Sayyid

Antipop Consortium chronology
Tragic Epilogue (2000)	Shopping Carts Crashing (2001)

Tragic Epilogue is the first studio album by American hip-hop group Antipop Consortium. It was released on 75 Ark on February 22, 2000. The group's member Beans described it as "a eulogy to the end of hip-hop".

== Critical reception ==
Professional ratings
Review scores
Source	Rating
AllMusic	4/5 stars
Robert Christgau	(1-star Honorable Mention)
CMJ New Music Report	favorable
Entertainment Weekly	B+
Pitchfork	6.5/10

James P. Wisdom of Pitchfork gave the album a 6.5 out of 10, saying: "It's an auspicious debut, but one that's more likely to draw your attention to the band's future than to send you scattering for spare change to pick it up." Ron Hart of CMJ New Music Report called it "a disjointed mindfuck of a rap album that aims to completely throw off your equilibrium" and stated that "Tragic Epilogue will appeal to both street and experimental heads alike." Jason Birchmeier of AllMusic wrote: "Though the album wasn't quite as daring as Antipop Consortium's successive releases, it nonetheless garnered substantial acclaim, placing the group among similarly edgy New York underground rap artists such as Company Flow."

The Wire named it the record of the year in its annual critics poll. In 2015, Fact placed it at number 75 on the "100 Best Indie Hip-Hop Records of All Time" list.

== Track listing ==
No.	Title	Length
1.	"Laundry"	4:13
2.	"Nude Paper"	3:15
3.	"Your World Is Flat"	3:09
4.	"PSA2"	0:51
5.	"9.99"	2:29
6.	"Rinseflow"	3:29
7.	"Here They Come Now"	0:55
8.	"Moon Zero X-M"	1:02
9.	"Lift"	2:23
10.	"Eyewall" (featuring Electro Foetus)	4:56
11.	"Sllab"	4:20
12.	"Monster Sex"	0:06
13.	"Smores"	3:09
14.	"Driving in Circles"	3:28
15.	"3 Digit Wiz"	4:15
16.	"Antontonebarr NE-0"	0:46
17.	"Heatrays" (featuring Aceyalone)	5:29
18.	"Disorientation" (featuring Apani B-Fly MC)	3:45
19.	"What Am I" (featuring Pharoah Monch and L.I.F.E.)	3:11
Total length:		55:11

== Personnel ==
Credits adapted from liner notes.

Anti Pop Consortium

- High Priest – vocals, production (1, 3, 11, 16, 17, 19), synthesizer (9), executive production
- Beans – vocals, production (2, 8, 12, 14), drums (9)
- Sayyid – vocals, production (5, 6, 7, 13)
- E. Blaize – production (4, 15, 18), co-production, engineering, mixing

Additional musicians

- Electro Foetus – production (10)
- Aceyalone – vocals (17)
- Apany B-Fly MC – vocals (18)
- Pharoah Monch – vocals (19)
- L.I.F.E. – vocals (19)

Technical personnel

- Vassos – mastering
