= The New Monday =

Studio album by Shigeto
- Released: October 6, 2017
- Length: 51:09
- Label: Ghostly International
- Producer: Zachary Saginaw

Shigeto chronology
Intermission (2015)	The New Monday (2017)	Cherry Blossom Baby (2024)

The New Monday is a studio album by American musician Shigeto. It was released on October 6, 2017, through Ghostly International. It received generally favorable reviews from critics.

== Background ==
The New Monday takes its title from "Monday Is the New Monday", a weekly event Shigeto has taken residency. It is Shigeto's first studio album since No Better Time Than Now (2013). It features contributions from Zelooperz, Kaleena Zanders, and Silas Green.

== Critical reception ==
Professional ratings
Aggregate scores
Source	Rating
Metacritic	72/100
Review scores
Source	Rating
AllMusic	3.5/5 stars
Exclaim!	8/10
The Line of Best Fit	7/10
The Skinny	3/5 stars

According to the review aggregator Metacritic, The New Monday received "generally favorable reviews" based on a weighted average score of 72 out of 100 from 4 critic scores.

Andy Kellman of AllMusic described the album as Shigeto's "most diverse bundle of tracks yet." Ashley Hampson of Exclaim! commented that "This LP captures Shigeto's embracing of myriad sounds, styles and sensibilities, and while his original sound still shines through, he shows the listener that diving into new territory can have massive payoffs." Simon Edwards of The Line of Best Fit stated, "It's great to see a musician push themselves outside of their comfort zone, taking in new inspiration, but it can be extremely hard to cram all these conflicting influences into one fluid piece of art."

== Track listing ==
All music is composed by Zachary Saginaw.

The New Monday track listing
No.	Title	Lyrics	Length
1.	"Detroit, Pt. 2"		7:30
2.	"Barry White" (featuring Zelooperz)	Zelooperz	5:37
3.	"Ice Breaker"	Andrew Douthard	6:37
4.	"In Case You Forgot"		2:59
5.	"There's a Vibe Tonight" (featuring Kaleena Zanders)	Kaleena Zanders	6:55
6.	"A2D" (featuring Zelooperz and Silas Green)	Zelooperz; Silas Green	4:23
7.	"Wit Da Cup"		5:48
8.	"Don't Trip" (featuring Silas Green)	Silas Green	6:25
9.	"When We Low"		4:55
Total length:			51:09

== Personnel ==
Credits adapted from liner notes.

- Zachary Saginaw – production, mixing, creative direction
- Marcus Elliott – tenor saxophone (1, 4, 9)
- Zelooperz – vocals (2, 6)
- Bill Spencer – additional production (2, 7)
- Andrey Douthard – vocals (3)
- Kaleena Zanders – vocals (5)
- Silas Green – vocals (6, 8)
- Nathaniel Miller – conversation (7)
- Mark Guiliana – drums (8)
- Ian Fink – synthesizer bass (9)
- Jonathan Maron – bass guitar (9)
- Christopher Koltay – mixing
- Dietrich Schoenemann – mastering
- Michael Cina – design
- Jon DeCola – photography
