= Shigeto (musician) =

- Also known as: Frank Omura
- Born: Zachary Shigeto Saginaw
- Origin: Ann Arbor, Michigan, United States
- Genre: Electronic
- Occupation: Record producer
- Years active: 2008–present
- Labels: Ghostly International; Moodgadget; Portage Garage Sounds

Zachary Shigeto Saginaw, better known mononymously as Shigeto, is an American electronic musician. He released Full Circle (2010), Lineage (2012), No Better Time Than Now (2013), The New Monday (2017), and Cherry Blossom Baby (2024).

== Biography ==
Zachary Shigeto Saginaw grew up in Ann Arbor, Michigan. He is a Japanese American. He attended School of Jazz and Contemporary Music in New York to study drum performance, but dropped out after a year and a half. He lived in New York City and London. He moved to Detroit in 2013.

Under the mononym Shigeto, he released Full Circle (2010), Lineage (2012), No Better Time Than Now (2013), The New Monday (2017), and Cherry Blossom Baby (2024).

He is a co-founder of the record label Portage Garage Sounds, along with his brother Ben Saginaw.

== Discography ==
=== Albums ===
- Full Circle (Ghostly International, 2010)
- Lineage (Ghostly International, 2012)
- No Better Time Than Now (Ghostly International, 2013)
- The New Monday (Ghostly International, 2017)
- Hotel San Claudio (with Mark de Clive-Lowe and Melanie Charles; Soul Bank Music, 2023)
- Cherry Blossom Baby (Ghostly International, 2024)

=== EPs ===
- New Crossings EP (Moodgadget, 2008)
- What We Held On To EP (Ghostly International, 2010)
- Semi Circle EP (Ghostly International, 2010)
- Full Circle Remixes (Ghostly International, 2011)
- Huron River Drive (Ghostly International, 2012)
- 2010 (with Devonwho; self-released, 2015)
- Intermission (Ghostly International, 2015)
- Weighted (Ghostly International, 2018)
- Versions (Ghostly International, 2019)

=== Contributions ===
- The Gaslamp Killer – Breakthrough ("Keep It Simple Stupid"; Brainfeeder, 2012)
- Dave Douglas – High Risk (Greenleaf, 2015)
- Dave Douglas – Dark Territory (Greenleaf, 2016)
- The Gaslamp Killer – Instrumentalepathy ("Shred You to Bits"; Cuss Records, 2016)
- Dabrye – Three/Three ("Sunset"; Ghostly International, 2018)
