= Queen of Japan =

Queen of Japan may refer to:

- Queen of Japan (band), a synthpop band from Europe
- Empress of Japan, especially the ones before the 7th century, who were only retroactively called empresses
- Himiko (c. 170–248), a Yamatai queen who was honored as "Queen of Japan" by the Cao Wei state in China; whether she was Empress Jingū as recorded in traditional Japanese historiography is unclear
