= End It All =

Studio album by Beans
- Released: February 15, 2011
- Genre: Hip hop
- Length: 32:56
- Label: Anticon
- Producer: Ade Firth, Nobody, Four Tet, Bumps, Sam Fog, Tobacco, Son Lux, In Flagranti, That Kid Prolific, Fred Bigot, Clark

Beans chronology
Thorns (2008)	End It All (2011)	Wolves of the World / Love Me Tonight / Haast (2017)

Professional ratings
Aggregate scores
Source	Rating
Metacritic	68/100
Review scores
Source	Rating
AllMusic	4/5 stars
BBC Music	favorable
Consequence of Sound	C−
Pitchfork	7.3/10
PopMatters	5/10 stars
Prefix	8.5/10
The Skinny	4/5 stars
Spin	favorable
Tiny Mix Tapes	3.5/5 stars
XLR8R	5.5/10

End It All is a 2011 studio album by American rapper Beans, released on Anticon. Produced by Four Tet and Tobacco, among others, it features a guest appearance from Tunde Adebimpe.

== Critical reception ==
At Metacritic, which assigns a weighted average score out of 100 to reviews from mainstream critics, End It All received an average score of 68% based on 15 reviews, indicating "generally favorable reviews".

Eric Grandy of Pitchfork gave the album a 7.3 out of 10, calling it "another well-earned notch in Beans' solo belt and a testament to the strength of his artistic vision". Bram Gieben of The Skinny gave the album 4 stars out of 5, saying, "Crucially, at 33 minutes, and most tracks under four, End It All never outstays its welcome."

== Track listing ==
No.	Title	Producer(s)	Length
1.	"Superstar Destroyer"	Ade Firth	3:43
2.	"Death Sweater"	Nobody	4:01
3.	"Glue Traps"	Four Tet	1:23
4.	"Electric Eliminator"	Bumps	2:02
5.	"Electric Bitch"	Sam Fog	3:47
6.	"Glass Coffins"	Tobacco	2:31
7.	"Blue Movie"	Son Lux	2:37
8.	"Mellow You Out" (featuring Tunde Adebimpe)	In Flagranti	2:08
9.	"Air Is Free"	In Flagranti	3:14
10.	"Forever Living Fresh"	That Kid Prolific	1:48
11.	"Anvil Falling"	Four Tet	0:53
12.	"Hardliner"	Fred Bigot	3:36
13.	"Hunter"	Clark	1:13

== Personnel ==
Credits adapted from liner notes.

- Beans – vocals
- Dan Huron – recording
- Earl Blaize – recording
- Fred Ones – recording
- Daddy Kev – mastering
- Ron Croudy – design
- Beowulf Sheehan – photography
