= Vice Versa (Funkstörung album) =

Compilation album of remixes by Funkstörung
- Released: October 30, 2001
- Genre: IDM
- Length: 51:34
- Label: !K7
- Producer: Michael Fakesch and Christian de Luca

Funkstörung chronology
Appetite for Disctruction (2000)	Vice Versa (2001)	Disconnected (2004)

Professional ratings
Review scores
Source	Rating
Allmusic	4.5/5 stars
laut.de	4/5 stars

Vice Versa is a collection of remixes done by the German IDM outfit Funkstörung and released on October 30, 2001. Also included are "Salt", a collaboration with rapper Beans, and "I Want Some Fun", a track taken from Jay Jay Johanson's Funkstörung-produced album Antenna. It is the second collection of Funkstörung remixes, the first being Additional Productions, released in 1999. Since Funkstörung usually rework the source material rather radically, these collections are often regarded as albums. Vice Versa was sold in a grey cardboard sleeve wrapped in thin styrofoam, with a printed paper strip around it, which makes the packaging very prone to damage. The packaging style is done as if it was inside-out; the inside is printed (while unopenable) with letters printed in obverse. Squeezing open the package allows one to see inside.

== Track listing ==
1. Plaid - "Eyen" (Funkstörung Remiks) – 3:47
2. Jay Jay Johanson - "I Want Some Fun" – 4:47
3. Nils Petter Molvær - "Solid Ether" (Funkstörung Miks) – 4:58
4. A Guy Called Gerald - "Humanity" (Funkstörung Remiks) – 3:53
5. Beans Mit Funkstörung - "Salt" – 3:29
6. Speedy J - "Something for Your Mind" (Funkstörung Remiks) – 5:24
7. Ike Yard - "N.C.R." (Remiksed by Funkstörung) – 4:55
8. The Notwist - "Moron" (Twisted by Funkstörung) – 3:35
9. Funckarma - "Spatial Convolution" (Morphed by Funkstörung) – 4:36
10. Phillip Boa and the Voodooclub - "Rome in the Rain" (Funkstörung Remiks) – 4:08
11. Tocotronic - "Morgen Wird Wie Heute Sein" (Funkstörung's K.O.K.O.N.U.T.S. Miks) – 3:36
12. Jean Michel Jarre - "C'est la Vie" (Reordered by Funkstörung) – 4:26
