= Disconnected (Funkstörung album) =

Studio album by Funkstörung
- Released: March 30, 2004
- Genre: IDM
- Length: 46:16
- Label: Studio !K7
- Producer: Funkstörung

Funkstörung chronology
Vice Versa (2001)	Disconnected (2004)	The Return to the Acid Planet (2005)

Singles from Disconnected
- 1. "Fat Camp Feva / Disconnected" Released: 2004; 2. "Moon Addicted / Chopping Heads" Released: 2004

Disconnected is a 2004 studio album by the German IDM duo Funkstörung, released on Studio !K7. It is an official follow-up to the 2000 debut studio album, Appetite for Disctruction.

== Critical reception ==
Professional ratings
Review scores
Source	Rating
AllMusic	2.5/5 stars
BBC Music	favorable
Dusted Magazine	favorable
Exclaim!	favorable
Prefix	4.0/10
Stylus Magazine	C

John Bush of AllMusic said, "Unfortunately, Disconnected has only occasional glimpses of the classic Funkstörung sound, and the balance of the record devolves into the style of confessional songwriting and guitar-driven arrangements that lesser electronic acts have since performed and played out." Ron Schepper of Stylus Magazine gave the album a grade of C, saying, "Long gone is the distinctive experimental style of early Funkstörung, and in its place are faceless Soul, Pop, Funk and Rap derivations."

== Track listing ==
No.	Title	Length
1.	"Cement Shoes" (featuring Enik)	5:01
2.	"Dirt Empire" (featuring Nils Petter Molvær)	1:37
3.	"Chopping Heads" (featuring Tes)	3:47
4.	"Habitual Citizens" (featuring Mark Boombastic)	0:53
5.	"Disconnected" (featuring Enik)	4:56
6.	"The Zoo"	1:04
7.	"Sleeping Beauty" (featuring Lou Rhodes)	4:12
8.	"Like a Poet" (featuring Enik)	4:05
9.	"Play Pause"	0:14
10.	"Fat Camp Feva" (featuring Tes)	4:18
11.	"Sleep Walking"	1:00
12.	"Moon Addicted" (featuring Enik)	4:29
13.	"Mr. Important" (featuring Rob Sonic)	5:01
14.	"Captured in Tones" (featuring Sarah Jay)	5:39
