= Tomorrow Right Now =

Studio album by Beans
- Released: March 10, 2003
- Genre: Hip hop
- Length: 47:34
- Label: Warp
- Producer: Beans

Beans chronology
Tomorrow Right Now (2003)	Shock City Maverick (2004)

Professional ratings
Aggregate scores
Source	Rating
Metacritic	73/100
Review scores
Source	Rating
AllMusic	3.5/5 stars
Billboard	favorable
Pitchfork	7.1/10
PopMatters	favorable

Tomorrow Right Now is a 2003 studio album by American rapper Beans, released on Warp.

== Critical reception ==
At Metacritic, which assigns a weighted average score out of 100 to reviews from mainstream critics, Tomorrow Right Now received an average score of 73% based on 14 reviews, indicating "generally favorable reviews".

Charles Spano of AllMusic gave the album 3.5 stars out of 5, calling it "a catchy but challenging mix of Beans' almost academic flow and crisp, unlikely samples and electronics." Julianne Escobedo Shepherd of Pitchfork gave the album a 7.1 out of 10, commenting that "Tomorrow pays homage to the gods of early 80s drum machines in a method consistent with Antipop Consortium: It melds the elements of current hip-hop with the Warp label's signature Powerbook programming."

== Track listing ==
No.	Title	Length
1.	"Roar"	2:21
2.	"Phreek the Beet"	3:17
3.	"Mearle"	4:12
4.	"Raping Silence"	3:05
5.	"Toast"	4:09
6.	"Hot Venom"	2:49
7.	"Crave"	3:50
8.	"Mutescreamer"	3:20
9.	"Sickle Cell Hysteria"	3:19
10.	"Booga Sugar"	2:54
11.	"Rose Periwinkle Plum"	5:14
12.	"Slow Broken"	3:10
13.	"Xon"	2:15
14.	"Walking by Night"	3:39
