= Two/Three =

Studio album by Dabrye
- Released: June 13, 2006
- Recorded: 2003–2006
- Genres: Hip-hop; electronic; IDM
- Length: 58:08
- Label: Ghostly International
- Producer: Dabrye

Tadd Mullinix chronology
The Dancing Box (2004)	Two/Three (2006)	Like No One (2008)

Two/Three is the second studio album by American musician Tadd Mullinix under his Dabrye alias. It was released on June 13, 2006 via Ghostly International. Produced entirely by Mullinix, it features guest appearances from Finale, Invincible, Kadence, Waajeed, A.G., Beans, Big Tone, Guilty Simpson, J Dilla, MF Doom, Paradime, Phat Kat, Ta'Raach, Vast Aire and Wildchild.

Comparing to its prequel, One/Three, which was released in 2001, the album almost doubles the length of its predecessor and, style wise, leans towards hip-hop music as it has guest vocal contributions from a number of rappers across fourteen of its twenty tracks. A sequel to Two/Three, Three/Three, was released in 2018.

== Critical reception ==
Professional ratings
Review scores
Source	Rating
AllHipHop	3/5 stars
AllMusic	4.5/5 stars
Pitchfork	5.2/10
PopMatters	8/10
Prefix	9/10
The Observer	4/5 stars
Tiny Mix Tapes	4/5 marks

AllMusic's Andy Kellman praised the album, calling it "the experience is dense and as cold as a Detroit alley on a February morning, packed with biting beats and thick atmospheric globs". Mike Krolak of Prefix also praised the album, calling it "truly the next logical step, a new way of looking at the realities of the coming age while keeping things in perspective". Neal Hayes of PopMatters wrote: "throughout 20 tracks, the producer creates an unsettling soundscape dominated by insistent, intricate rhythms which often react with the vocals to stunning effect". Steve Yates of The Observer noted "Dabrye's production containing all the arrogance of crunk but a range and innovation that far outstrips anything else around". Alan Ranta of Tiny Mix Tapes wrote "the tunes Tadd Mullinix puts out as Dabrye are obviously hip-hop... or at least contain strong elements of electronica".

In mixed reviews, Robert Long of AllHipHop concluded: "though it's tough to swallow all the Dabrye flavored Kool-Aid, on Two/Three the man doubled up with a solid effort". Ryan Dombal of Pitchfork praised Mullinix's "singular Timbaland-meets-the flipside of Low rumble" as "more focused and intricate than ever", simultaneously criticizing many of the rappers as "wordy know-it-alls hell-bent on disrupting his groove". He praises Guilty Simpson's appearance as an example of "what Two/Three could be if the rappers were chosen based on entertainment value rather than how hard they're trying to save rap with big words".

== Track listing ==
No.	Title	Writer(s)	Producer(s)	Length
1.	"The Stand" (featuring Wildchild)	Tadd Mullinix; Jack Brown	Dabrye	3:32
2.	"Air" (featuring MF Doom)	Mullinix; Daniel Dumile	Dabrye	3:10
3.	"Machines, Pt. 1"	Mullinix	Dabrye	1:37
4.	"Encoded Flow" (featuring Kadence)	Mullinix; Brandon Mitchell	Dabrye	2:52
5.	"That's What's Up" (featuring Vast Aire)	Mullinix; Theodore Arrington; Thomas Fehlmann	Dabrye; Thomas Fehlmann (co.)	4:03
6.	"Tell Dem"	Mullinix	Dabrye	3:04
7.	"Nite Eats Day" (featuring Beans)	Mullinix; Robert Stewart	Dabrye	1:56
8.	"Jorgy" (featuring Waajeed)	Mullinix; Robert O'Bryant	Dabrye; Waajeed (co.)	2:54
9.	"Special" (featuring Guilty Simpson and Paradime)	Mullinix; Byron Simpson; Frederick Beauregard	Dabrye	3:29
10.	"Bloop"	Mullinix	Dabrye	1:57
11.	"Viewer Discretion" (featuring Invincible and Finale)	Mullinix; Ilana Weaver; Derek Cooper	Dabrye	3:00
12.	"Piano"	Mullinix	Dabrye	4:05
13.	"Pressure" (featuring Waajeed and Ta'Raach)	Mullinix; O'Bryant; Terrell McMathis	Dabrye; Waajeed (co.)	3:20
14.	"Reconsider" (featuring Kadence)	Mullinix; Mitchell	Dabrye	3:24
15.	"Get It Together" (featuring Invincible and Finale)	Mullinix; Weaver; Cooper	Dabrye	3:32
16.	"My Life" (featuring AG)	Mullinix; Andre Barnes	Dabrye	2:19
17.	"In Water"	Mullinix	Dabrye	1:57
18.	"Get Live" (featuring Big Tone)	Mullinix; Anthony Jackson	Dabrye	3:37
19.	"Machines, Pt. 2"	Mullinix	Dabrye	0:39
20.	"Game Over" (featuring Phat Kat and Jay Dee)	Mullinix; Ronald Watts; James Yancey	Dabrye; Jay Dee (add.)	3:41
Total length:				58:08

Sample credits

- Tracks 3 and 19 sample music track "Zodiac" by Zodiac from their 1980 Disco Alliance album.
