= Thorns (Beans album) =

Studio album by Beans
- Released: March 25, 2008
- Genre: Hip hop
- Length: 39:40
- Label: Adored and Exploited
- Producer: Beans, Dabrye

Beans chronology
| Shock City Maverick (2004) | Thorns (2008) | End It All (2011) |

Professional ratings
Review scores
| Source | Rating |
|---|---|
| AllMusic | 4/5 stars |
| The List | 4/5 stars |
| Pitchfork | 7.5/10 |
| Spin | favorable |

Thorns is a 2008 studio album by American rapper Beans, released on Adored and Exploited. It includes contributions from Dabrye and Holy Fuck.

== Critical reception ==
Steve Glencross of The List gave the album 4 stars out of 5 and described it as "a hard-hitting and personal work." Roque Strew of Pitchfork gave the album a 7.5 out of 10, saying, "Thorns proves that Beans can smoothly career between maximalism and minimalism when he's in his element, building on the sci-fi slam poetry heritage he created with High Priest, M. Sayyid, and Earl Blaize."

== Track listing ==
| No. | Title | Length |
|---|---|---|
| 1. | "Thundermouth" | 2:26 |
| 2. | "Fearless Leader" | 2:21 |
| 3. | "Best of the Losers" | 1:51 |
| 4. | "Fingers" | 2:36 |
| 5. | "No Thrills" | 4:50 |
| 6. | "We Rock" | 2:13 |
| 7. | "Sudden Death Academics" | 3:45 |
| 8. | "Beauty of a Beast on a Beat" | 3:26 |
| 9. | "Razor Boss" | 3:33 |
| 10. | "MVP" | 3:53 |
| 11. | "In Effect" | 2:54 |
| 12. | "Return of the Gold Skull" | 2:28 |
| 13. | "Ultimate" | 3:26 |
