= Dark Territory (album) =

Studio album by Dave Douglas
- Released: June 8, 2016
- Recorded: October 10, 2014
- Studio: The Bunker, Brooklyn
- Genre: Jazz
- Length: 40:09
- Label: Greenleaf GRE-1048
- Producer: Dave Douglas

Dave Douglas chronology
Brazen Heart (2015)	Dark Territory (2016)

Dark Territory is a studio album by trumpeter Dave Douglas which was released in June 2016 on Douglas' Greenleaf Music label. The album is named after Fred Kaplan's book Dark Territory: The Secret History of Cyber War released in 2016.

== Reception ==
Professional ratings
Review scores
Source	Rating
All About Jazz	3.5/5 stars
AllMusic	4/5 stars
DownBeat	4.5/5 stars
Irish Times	5/5 stars

The AllMusic review awarded the album 4 stars out of 5, stating "As with 2014's High Risk, Dark Territory features live, in-studio performances Douglas has dubbed "electro-acoustic" jams. These primarily consist of computer- and synth-based soundscapes created by Shigeto that Douglas and his ensemble play along to. Shigeto then manipulates and interacts with the band and his soundscapes in real time, sculpting the proceedings. The result is a sound that falls somewhere in between experimental electronica and avant-garde jazz improvisation ... Ultimately, it's that visual and physical tangibility of Douglas and Shigeto's collaborations that makes Dark Territory such a heightened listening experience". They also selected it as one of their Favorite Jazz Albums of 2016.

DownBeat said "Douglas and his group High Risk have created something original here. Dark Territory is addictive, and while it wears its influences—Miles Davis, Ministry, Nine Inch Nails, David Bowie, hip-hop—on its daring, highly stylized sleeve, it’s also unique." On All About Jazz Mark F. Turner stated "Jazz purists will probably not change their minds about High Risk's new electronic playground but Dark Territory is certainly an interesting excursion". In JazzTimes, Steve Greenlee noted "The trumpeter looks forward and backward, grabbing from any genre he likes while pushing every boundary of jazz". Fred Kaplan in his review for Stereophile stated "...Dark Territory is a terrific album—dark, moody, virtuosic in a manner both combustible and streamlined".

== Track listing ==
All compositions by Dave Douglas except where noted

1. "Celine" – 6:43
2. "All the Pretty Horsepower" – 7:02
3. "Let's Get One Thing Straight" (Dave Douglas, Mark Guiliana, Jonathan Maron, Zachary Saginaw, Steve Wall) – 5:50
4. "Mission Acropolis" (Douglas, Guiliana, Maron, Saginaw, Wall) – 5:28
5. "Ridge Hill" (Douglas, Guiliana, Maron, Saginaw, Wall) – 3:55
6. "Neural" – 4:51
7. "Loom Large" – 6:20

== Personnel ==
- Dave Douglas – trumpet
- Shigeto – electronics
- Jonathan Maron – electronic bass, synth bass
- Mark Guiliana – acoustic and electronic drums
