= Enik =

Enik (*1980) is a songwriter, singer, and musician from Munich, Germany.

He released his first EP "Without a bark" in 2003 (Wonder Records) and was the songwriter and singer for four songs on Funkstörung's album Disconnected (2004), most notably the title track.

In 2005, his album "The Seasons in Between" was released on Labels Germany (a sublabel of EMI). Enik combined different styles of music and the German internet magazine laut.de compared him to Tom Waits, Giant Sand, Peter Gabriel and David Bowie. Another review can be found in the German music magazine Intro. Also in 2006, Enik released his EP "Antenna" and in 2007 his album "Chainsaw Buddha". Both are just available as download, as on iTunes.

In 2007, Enik did songwriting and singing for the vocal tracks on Chris Gall Trio album "climbing up" and toured with them throughout Europe. He cowrote and sang on the second Chris Gall Trio record "hello stranger" in 2010.

Enik also wrote songs for Thomas D released in 2010. His latest release titled "I Sold My Moon Boots to a Girl From Greece" was released in 2011. Having just finished the soundtrack for the film feature "Guantanamo".

Several of Enik's songs can be seen on video at www.youtube.com/enikenik
