= Hyperdaze =

Studio album by Void of Vision
- Released: 13 September 2019
- Recorded: 2019
- Genre: Metalcore
- Length: 30:50
- Label: UNFD
- Producer: Jon Deiley, Lance Prenc

Void of Vision chronology
Disturbia (2017)	Hyperdaze (2019)

Singles from Hyperdaze
- 1. "Hole in Me" Released: 23 July 2019; 2. "Babylon" Released: 3 September 2019; 3. "If Only" Released: 9 September 2019

Hyperdaze is the second studio album by Australian metalcore band Void of Vision. It was released on 13 September 2019 by UNFD. It was produced by Northlane guitarist Jon Deiley and Lance Prenc, and recorded at Prenc's home studio in Kinglake.

== Background and promotion ==
On 22 July 2019, UNFD announced that they would be releasing four band's new songs, Void of Vision was later revealed to be one of them.

On 23 July, their new single "Hole in Me" was released alongside an accompanying music video. Their sophomore studio album Hyperdaze was then announced for a release date of 13 September. On 3 September, their second single "Babylon" was released. On 9 September, their third single "If Only" was released alongside an accompanying music video.

From October–December, Void of Vision are set to join Northlane on their Australian and European legs of their Alien World Tour.

== Writing and composition ==
About how the album will be heavy and angry, vocalist Jack Bergin said:

"From fine-tuning and tweaking all the synths and accompaniment to the grittiness and aggression of the vocals, we really wanted the pure anger that went into making these recordings to translate out the other side – something I feel we haven’t quite grasped on previous records."

Bergin also revealed that the themes present on the album are: "Pure hatred, self-loathing and nihilism."

"Hole in Me" was described as sounding "like The Prodigy blended with metalcore with plenty of ambient synth and distorted screams."

== Track listing ==
No.	Title	Writer(s)	Length
1.	"Overture"	Jack Bergin, James McKendrick	0:42
2.	"Year of the Rat"	Bergin, McKendrick, Jon Deiley	3:31
3.	"Babylon"	Bergin, McKendrick	2:07
4.	"If Only"	Bergin, McKendrick, Deiley, Sam Bassal	3:51
5.	"Slave to the Name"	Dan Brown, Bergin, McKendrick, Deiley, Bassal	3:31
6.	"Adrenaline"	McKendrick, Deiley	1:31
7.	"Hole in Me"	Bergin, McKendrick, Deiley	3:23
8.	"Kerosene Dream"	Bergin, McKendrick, Deiley	2:41
9.	"Decay"	Bergin, McKendrick, Deiley, Lance Prenc	3:12
10.	"Splinter"	Bergin, McKendrick	3:14
11.	"Hyperdaze"	Bergin, McKendrick, Deiley	3:07
Total length:			30:50

== Personnel ==
Void of Vision

- Jack Bergin – unclean vocals
- James McKendrick – lead guitar, clean vocals
- Mitch Fairlie – rhythm guitar
- George Murphy – drums

Production

- Jon Deiley – producer
- Lance Prenc – producer, mixing, mastering, engineering
- Scott Simpson – vocal engineering

== Charts ==
Chart (2019)	Peak position
Australian Digital Albums (ARIA)	36

Chart (2021)	Peak position
Vinyl Albums (ARIA)	7
