= Disturbia (soundtrack) =

Disturbia: Original Motion Picture Soundtrack

Soundtrack album by Various Artists
- Released: March 4, 2007
- Recorded: 2006–2007
- Genres: Pop, rock, hip hop
- Length: 45:46
- Label: Lakeshore
- Producers: Brian McNelis; Skip Williamson

Disturbia: Original Motion Picture Soundtrack is a soundtrack to the film of the same name directed by D. J. Caruso. It was released on March 4, 2007 in the United States and Canada by Lakeshore Records.

== Reception ==
Professional ratings
Review scores
Source	Rating
AllMusic	3/5 stars
Empire	3/5 stars
Soundtrack.net	2.5/5 stars

Disturbia: Original Motion Picture Soundtrack received generally mixed reviews from most music critics. A review in AllMusic wrote: "For his score to the 2007 surprise hit thriller Disturbia, composer Geoff Zanelli created moody, nuanced orchestral pieces that both heighten the film's drama and reveal a delicate sensitivity. With its elegant and evocative tracks, this album marks Zanelli as a promising film-score composer, and works as an excellent counterpoint to the eclectic, pop-oriented Disturbia soundtrack."

Kat Brown of Empire Online gave the soundtrack three stars out of five, he wrote: "Crafted from the age-old frat-boy building blocks of alt-rock, rap and warbling balladry, Shia LaBeouf's suburban-hell ordeal threatens to infect its own soundtrack before being rescued by some last-minute class. The initial outlook is depressing: a cheery opener from beach-punks Nada Surf is squashed by soggy dirges from This World Fair and Guster, while Afroman's "Because I Got High" is so linked to Jay and Silent Bob that it sounds like we've temporarily jumped film. Some judicious use of the skip button improves matters considerably, with eerie reggae from Berlin producers Noiseshaper and the sweet tones of singer-songwriter Priscilla Ahn segueing perfectly into Thomas J. Mitchell's classic "Loving You", before Lou Rawls takes us far, far away from little white picket fences and into the big city with "You'll Never Find Another Love Like Mine".

Matt Millstein of Soundtrack.net gave the soundtrack two-and-a-half stars out of five, stating that "the song soundtrack to D. J. Caruso's recent suspense thriller Disturbia suffers the fate of many recent song soundtracks; it feels lackluster and thrown together. There's no flow, no common thread. It's like when your friend gives you a CD mix that is so eclectic that you can't get your head around; you find a few songs that you like and discard the rest. The Disturbia soundtrack is one of those confusing mixes. From the smooth soul sounds of Lou Rawls, to the college pop of Guster, to the whiskey drenched rock n' roll of Buckcherry, and the space funk of Cee-Lo Green's "Love Stink, this soundtrack is all over the map. The original song written for the film, "Don't Make Me Wait" by This Worlds Fair was co-written by the film's composer, Geoff Zanelli, and integrates the love theme from the film, but with a good album there needs to be some kind of focus or theme and a general flow from song to song, unfortunately there isn't one here."

== Track listing ==
No.	Title	Performer	Length
1.	"Always Love"	Nada Surf	3:16
2.	"Don't Make Me Wait"	This World Fair	3:47
3.	"One Man Wrecking Machine"	Guster	4:13
4.	"Whoa Now"	Louque	4:02
5.	"Gangsta Boogie"	Love Stink	4:06
6.	"Next 2 You"	Buckcherry	3:25
7.	"Because I Got High"	Afroman	4:23
8.	"We Love Reggae"	Noiseshaper	4:07
9.	"Dream"	Priscilla Ahn	3:29
10.	"The Great American Napkin"	The Summer Skinny	3:04
11.	"Lovin' You"	Minnie Riperton	3:23
12.	"You'll Never Find Another Love Like Mine"	Lou Rawls	4:25
Total length:			45:46

"Taper Jean Girl" by Kings Of Leon and "Lonely Day" by System of a Down are not featured on the soundtrack even though they are in the film.
