= Gerhard Potuznik =

Austrian electronic musician

Gerhard Potuznik (also known as GD Luxxe) is an electronic musician of Vienna, Austria. He has been creating music since the early 1980s. His recording career began in 1988 with a release on Gig Records (home of Falco). Later he joined forces with Patrick Pulsinger to release a string of popular 12-inches on the influential Cheap Records label. His reputation outside Vienna grew quickly and he began collaborating with like-minded artists. By the mid-1990s he'd become a producer and a member of arty techno-punks Chicks on Speed.

In 1998 Potuznik founded the Angelika Koehlermann label (which has gone on to release over twenty albums of low-fi pop and wild-style electronic music). Potuznik collaborated with Electronicat, one of the label's first signings, and released a remix album featuring ADULT, The Hacker, Kid606, Dat politics, and Original Hamster.

1999 saw the release of album Submission on DMX Krew's Breakin' Records and Potuznik's artist alias GD Luxxe was born. Widely acclaimed releases followed on renowned indie electronic labels such as Suction, Interdimensional Transmissions, Mego and Detroit's Ersatz Audio. The album Make for Tigerbeat6 was released in 2006 (rereleased in 2007 on Monkey Music).

== Projects ==
Potuznik has released eight solo records, as well as numerous maxis on several labels, including Cheap and Mego, Disko 8, Ersatz Audio, Relish, and Tigerbeat 6. Potuznik is also producing acts including Chicks On Speed, Mediengruppe Telekommander, Minisex, Janosch Moldau, Black Palms Orchester, The Magic Ray, and his band project MÄUSE with Tex Rubinowitz, with whom he has released four records so far.

== GD Luxxe ==
In the center of all this remains Gerhard Potuznik's musical alter ego. As GD Luxxe, he began working on cool electronic tracks in the mid-1990s. Ed DMX, a.k.a. DMX Krew, brought GD Luxxe's music to London-based label Breakin' Records, while Interdimensional Transmissions and Ersatz Audio from Detroit released records as much as Canadian record label Suction Records.

In the midst of the 2000s' electroclash hype, Gerhard re-discovered his guitar, which was the foundation of Between Zero and Eternity, the record that was released in 2004 on US cult label Ersatz Audio. Its successor Make (2006) was released by Tigerbeat 6 in the US, continues the path. Minimalist guitars are the starting pointers, that mutate into unrecognizable sounds on the computer, until templates like "rock'n'roll", "retro" or "electro" don't quite work anymore. In the end of 2008, the eight solo record called Crave was released. It showed a more accessible side of Gerhard Potuznik and the song "Believe" made it to the second place of Austria's FM4 Charts.

== The Happy Sun ==
After Crave, things started to get hectic in Gerhard's studio. More and more bands and musicians knocked on his doors, looking for a spot to be produced or mixed by him. This led to the establishment of Phlox, a dubtechno label on which Gerhard started releasing tracks with Martin "Dibek" Sovinz. Besides that he also recorded classic indie rock songs, in the beginning without much of a plan, more to just have a compensation to the ever-growing work load with Mäuse, Minisex, Janosch Moldau, Christian Fuchs (Black Palms Orchester) and Christina "Chra" Nemec. In late 2018, a dozen songs were left from the recorded material, songs that stood for the new style and didn't have much in common with the electric sounds of the past.

The Happy Sun was born and Gerhard returned to his roots. Music he once recorded on with two cassette decks, cheap electric guitars and even cheaper drum computers – a wild mix of The Cure, Wire, Hüsker Du, Joy Division/New Order and similar bands. A few of these recordings were re-recorded for The Happy Sun, but the majority of the part is made up of completely new songs. Co-producer Bernd Heinrauch describes the music as "psychedelic-shoegaze-seventies-rock", which is anything but far from the truth. Through Hans Platzgumer, with whom Gerhard already released music on Disko B, came the connection to Noise Appeal Records and it was decided to work together. The chosen songs were mixed and co-produced by mixing guru Bernd Heinrauch, while Philipp Pluhar provided the drums and Christina Nemec the backing vocals. Playing live, Potuznik is supported by Christoph Baumgartner (bass), Clemens Haipl (guitar) and Josef Zorn (drums).
