= Antipop vs. Matthew Shipp =

Studio album by Antipop Consortium / Matthew Shipp
- Released: February 18, 2003
- Genres: Hip-hop; jazz
- Length: 41:59
- Label: Thirsty Ear Recordings
- Producers: Antipop Consortium; Matthew Shipp; Peter Gordon

Antipop Consortium chronology
Arrhythmia (2002)	Antipop vs. Matthew Shipp (2003)	Fluorescent Black (2009)

Matthew Shipp chronology
Equilibrium (2003)	Antipop vs. Matthew Shipp (2003)	Good and Evil Sessions (2003)

Antipop vs. Matthew Shipp is a collaborative studio album by Antipop Consortium and Matthew Shipp. It was released on Thirsty Ear Recordings on February 18, 2003.

== Critical reception ==
Professional ratings
Aggregate scores
Source	Rating
Metacritic	76/100
Review scores
Source	Rating
All About Jazz	favorable
AllMusic	4/5 stars
Pitchfork	7.2/10
PopMatters	favorable
Stylus Magazine	C
Tiny Mix Tapes	4/5 stars

At Metacritic, which assigns a weighted average score out of 100 to reviews from mainstream critics, the album received an average score of 76, based on 12 reviews, indicating "generally favorable reviews".

Farrell Lowe of All About Jazz described the album as "hip music coming from modern jazz, with hip-hop masters gettin' next to it." Ed Howard of Stylus Magazine gave the album a grade of C, saying: "Despite being a very enjoyable listen from start to finish, this record also has a clear sense of unfulfilled promise." Meanwhile, Marshall Bowden of PopMatters said: "With neither side ceding territory to the other, it is still apparent that these musical forms can interact in meaningful ways."

== Track listing ==
No.	Title	Length
1.	"Places I've Never Been"	3:21
2.	"Staph"	5:38
3.	"Slow Horn"	3:09
4.	"A Knot in Your Bop"	4:02
5.	"SVP"	5:19
6.	"Coda"	3:23
7.	"Stream Light"	3:41
8.	"Monstro City"	3:05
9.	"Real Is Surreal"	3:08
10.	"Free Hop"	7:13
Total length:		41:59

== Personnel ==
Credits adapted from liner notes.

- Antipop Consortium – vocals, synthesizer, programming, production
- Matthew Shipp – piano, production
- William Parker – double bass
- Guillermo E. Brown – drums
- Khan Jamal – vibraphone
- Daniel Carter – trumpet
- Peter Gordon – production
- Cynthia Fetty – design, photography

== Charts ==
Chart	Peak position
US Top Jazz Albums (Billboard)	22
