= Arrhythmia (Antipop Consortium album) =

Studio album by Antipop Consortium
- Released: April 2, 2002
- Genre: Hip-hop
- Length: 43:09
- Label: Warp
- Producers: Antipop Consortium; High Priest; M. Sayyid; E. Blaize; Beans

Antipop Consortium chronology
Shopping Carts Crashing (2000)	Arrhythmia (2002)	Antipop vs. Matthew Shipp (2003)

Singles from Arrhythmia
- 1. "Ghostlawns" Released: July 8, 2002

Arrhythmia is a studio album by American hip-hop group Antipop Consortium. It was released on Warp on April 2, 2002. It peaked at number 29 on the UK Independent Albums Chart.

== Critical reception ==
Professional ratings
Review scores
Source	Rating
AllMusic	4/5 stars
The A.V. Club	favorable
CMJ New Music Monthly	favorable
CMJ New Music Report	favorable
Pitchfork	7.7/10
PopMatters	mixed
Stylus Magazine	C−

Brad Haywood of Pitchfork gave the album a 7.7 out of 10, saying, "despite its shortcomings, Arrhythmia has plenty of appeal, particularly to the indie crowd, for whom progressivism is a badge of pride." Lisa Hageman of CMJ New Music Report said: "This album has been meticulously crafted down to the tiniest detail, rendering each track its own unique and complete experience."

Chicago Reader placed it at number 7 on the "Best Releases of 2002" list. In 2009, The Skinny included it on the "Warp Essentials" list.

== Track listing ==
No.	Title	Producer(s)	Length
1.	"Contraption"	Antipop Consortium	0:58
2.	"Bubblz"	High Priest	3:26
3.	"Ping Pong"	M. Sayyid; E. Blaize	2:42
4.	"Dead in Motion"	E. Blaize	4:18
5.	"Mega"	M. Sayyid; E. Blaize; Shawn Tronchin	2:24
6.	"Silver Heat"	E. Blaize	3:14
7.	"EKG"	E. Blaize	0:30
8.	"Ghostlawns" / "2"	Beans; High Priest; E. Blaize; / Antipop Consortium	4:12
9.	"We Kill Soap Scum"	High Priest; E. Blaize	3:14
10.	"Z St."	M. Sayyid	2:51
11.	"Traum"	High Priest; E. Blaize	2:22
12.	"Tron Man Speaks"	High Priest	1:57
13.	"Focused"	M. Sayyid	2:27
14.	"Conspiracy of Myth"	High Priest; Shawn Tronchin	3:34
15.	"Human Shield" / "Place the Face"	Antipop Consortium / E. Blaize	5:00
Total length:			43:09

== Personnel ==
Credits adapted from liner notes.

Antipop Consortium

- Beans – vocals, production (1, 8, 15), art direction, design
- E. Blaize – vocals, production (1, 3–9, 11, 15), timbales (2), keyboards (14), engineering, mixing, art direction, design
- High Priest – vocals, production (1, 2, 8, 9, 11, 12, 14, 15), art direction, design
- M. Sayyid – vocals, production (1, 3, 5, 8, 10, 13, 15), art direction, design

Additional musicians

- Ernesto Abreau – conga (2)
- Nedelka Prescod – vocals (5)
- Shawn "Keys" Tronchin – strings (5, 14), production (5, 14)
- Michael Figaro – vocals (6)
- Andrew Bartolomeo – vocals (6)
- Aswan – vocals (8)
- Tron Man – vocals (8, 12)
- Leon Gruenbaum – keyboards (14)

Technical personnel

- Ken Heitmuller – mastering
- Ron Croudy – art direction, design
- Chris Davison – photography

== Charts ==
Chart	Peak position
UK Independent Albums (OCC)	29
