= Children of Chrome =

2016 album by Void of Vision

Studio album by Void of Vision
- Released: 30 September 2016
- Recorded: 2016
- Genre: Metalcore, nu metal
- Length: 31:14
- Label: UNFD
- Producer: Sam Bassal

Void of Vision chronology
Broken // Bones (2014)	Children of Chrome (2016)	Disturbia (2017)

Singles from Children of Chrome
- 1. "Sunrise" Released: 18 June 2015; 2. "//" Released: 5 September 2016; 3. "Ctrl Freak" Released: 29 September 2016

Children of Chrome is the debut studio album by Australian metalcore band Void of Vision, released on 30 September 2016 by UNFD. It was produced by Ocean Grove's drummer Sam Bassal. It peaked in the top 60 of the ARIA Albums Chart.

== Singles and promotion ==
To promote their debut album, Void of Vision set up a national tour organised by Destroy All Lines. They performed in Fitzroy, Adelaide, Footscray, Sydney, Newcastle, and Woolloongabba from 21–30 October. The first single of the album, "Sunrise" (stylised as "Sun//Rise") and its accompanying music video were released to YouTube on 18 June 2015, garnering over 73,000 views to date. Their second single from the album, "//" featuring guest vocals by Drew York, was released on 5 September 2016. Its music video has since accumulated over 95,000 views on YouTube. Their third and final single from the album, "Ctrl Freak" was released on 29 September, a day before the album's release. Its music video has since been viewed over 23,000 times.

== Writing and composition ==
All songs were written by frontman Jack Bergin with additional input from guitarist James McKendrick and producer Sam Bassal. Drew York from the American hardcore band Stray from the Path was featured on the single "//". The album was also described as being different from their previous singles, it was noted that elements of nu metal had made its way into the album. UNFD describes the album as being a "statement for people who give a fuck in a world intoxicated by power, greed and hatred."

The single "Ctrl Freak" was described by Bergin as "refer[ing] to anyone using the internet as a faux pedestal for themselves. Mainly [...] the 'social justice warriors' out there who associate social status negatively with empathy for real world issues, practically exploiting them."

== Critical reception ==
Professional ratings
Review scores
Source	Rating
AAA Backstage	3.5/4 stars
KillYourStereo	60/100
Metal Hammer	3/5 stars

The album received mixed reviews. Nick Dominko of KillYourStereo praised the first few tracks on the albums but called the rest "sadly forgettable." AAA Backstage gave the album a more favourable review, however stated: "…it’s regrettable that Void of Vision were unable to capture the fury and emotional intensity they had clearly demonstrated throughout the album and produce a powerful ending." In a positive review from Metal Hammer they commented: "If [Void of Vision] find a way to combine, rather than compartmentalise, these contrasting sides then they could be huge."

== Track listing ==
Track listing adapted from Spotify. Writers from APRA AMCOS.

No.	Title	Writer(s)	Length
1.	"//" (featuring Drew York)	Jack Bergin, Mitchell Farlie, James McKendrick, George Pfaendner, Matthew Guy Thompson	3:08
2.	"Blacklist"	Bergin, Farlie, McKendrick, Pfaendner, Thompson	2:35
3.	"Ctrl Freak"	Bergin, Farlie, McKendrick, Pfaendner, Thompson	3:28
4.	"The Hills"	Bergin, Farlie, McKendrick, Pfaendner, Thompson, Samuel Bassal	2:33
5.	"In Black & White"	Bergin, Farlie, McKendrick, Pfaendner, Thompson, Bassal	2:15
6.	"As Above, So Below"	Bergin, Farlie, McKendrick, Thompson	2:02
7.	"Wallow"	Bergin, Farlie, McKendrick, Pfaendner, Thompson, Bassal	3:12
8.	"Under Skin"	Bergin, Farlie, McKendrick, Pfaendner, Thompson	1:20
9.	"Sunrise"	Bergin, Farlie, McKendrick, Thompson, Bassal	3:24
10.	"Red Handed"	Bergin, Farlie, McKendrick, Pfaendner, Thompson	2:57
11.	"Fair-Weather"	Bergin, Farlie, McKendrick, Pfaendner, Thompson, Bassal	4:13
Total length:			31:14

== Personnel ==
Void of Vision

- Jack Bergin – vocals
- James McKendrick – lead guitar, clean vocals
- Mitch Fairlie – rhythm guitar
- George Murphy – drums
- Matt Thompson – bass

Other musicians

- Drew York – guest vocals on "//"

Production

- Sam Bassal – producer
