= Three/Three =

Studio album by Dabrye
- Released: February 16, 2018
- Length: 57:15
- Label: Ghostly International

Dabrye chronology
Two/Three (2006)	Three/Three (2018)

Professional ratings
Aggregate scores
Source	Rating
Metacritic	80/100
Review scores
Source	Rating
AllMusic	4/5 stars
Clash	6/10
Exclaim!	8/10
Pitchfork	7/10

Three/Three is the third studio album by American musician Tadd Mullinix, under the name Dabrye. It was released on February 16, 2018 by Ghostly International.

== Critical reception ==
Three/Three was met with "generally favorable" reviews from critics. At Metacritic, which assigns a weighted average rating out of 100 to reviews from mainstream publications, this release received an average score of 80 based on 8 reviews. Aggregator Album of the Year gave the release a 74 out of 100 based on a critical consensus of 6 reviews.

== Track listing ==
No.	Title	Length
1.	"Tunnel Vision" (featuring Guilty Simpson)	2:27
2.	"Emancipated" (featuring Ghostface Killah)	2:27
3.	"Tape Flip Too"	1:04
4.	"Lil Mufukuz" (featuring MF Doom)	2:44
5.	"Fightscene" (featuring La Peace)	3:37
6.	"Electrocutor"	1:23
7.	"Stranded" (featuring Fatt Father)	3:07
8.	"The Appetite" (featuring Roc Marciano, Quelle Chris, & Danny Brown)	5:19
9.	"Pretty" (featuring Jonwayne)	3:03
10.	"Sunset" (featuring Shigeto)	4:00
11.	"Nova" (featuring Nolan The Ninja)	3:25
12.	"Bubble Up" (featuring Phat Kat)	3:17
13.	"Vert-Horiz"	2:44
14.	"Dr. Shroomen" (featuring G&D)	3:21
15.	"Sisfro Ridin'" (featuring Clear Soul Forces)	3:15
16.	"Culture Shuffle" (featuring Kadence, Intricate Dialect, & Silas Green)	4:16
17.	"Honey"	3:03
18.	"First Law of Nature Rock Day" (featuring Denmark Vessey)	3:32
19.	"Tahn Ice Rhythm"	1:11
