= Miss le Bomb =

Miss le bomb is the pseudonym of artist and musician Catriona Shaw (born in Edinburgh, Scotland). After finishing her studies at Edinburgh College of Art in 1997 she moved to Munich, Germany to continue her studies at the Munich Academy of Fine Arts and quickly became involved in the underground music circuit there. Teaming up with fellow students Emanuel Günther a.k.a. Dompteur Mooner of Zombie Nation and Benjamin Bergmann she formed Club le Bomb, an illegal Sunday club where happenings and concerts were staged and with which they toured around Europe in 2000 under the title "Club le Bomb: World Tour". She also enjoyed some success as lead singer of the pop covers project Queen of Japan (with musicians Hans Platzgumer and Albert Poeschl). After moving to Berlin in 2004 she started to produce music as Miss le Bomb, and regularly collaborates with Electronicat.

== Discography as Miss le Bomb ==
- Pinkitan, (Girl Monster), Chicks on Speed Records, 2006
- Jealousy, Careless Records, 2006
- Lost Gigabyte, (with Electronicat), Pudel Produkte, 2006
- Vampire Moped Dead, (The Wired Ones), Wired Records, 2006
- Birds want to have cats, (Re:bird), Angelika Koehlermann, 2004
- Keiren, (with Electronicat), Echokammer, 2003

== Discography as Catriona Shaw ==
- Keyboard Lies, (as E:Gum), Klein Records, 2002
- Miss Me, (with Hans Platzgumer), Doxa Records, 2002

== See also ==
- Catriona
