= Void of Vision =

Australian band

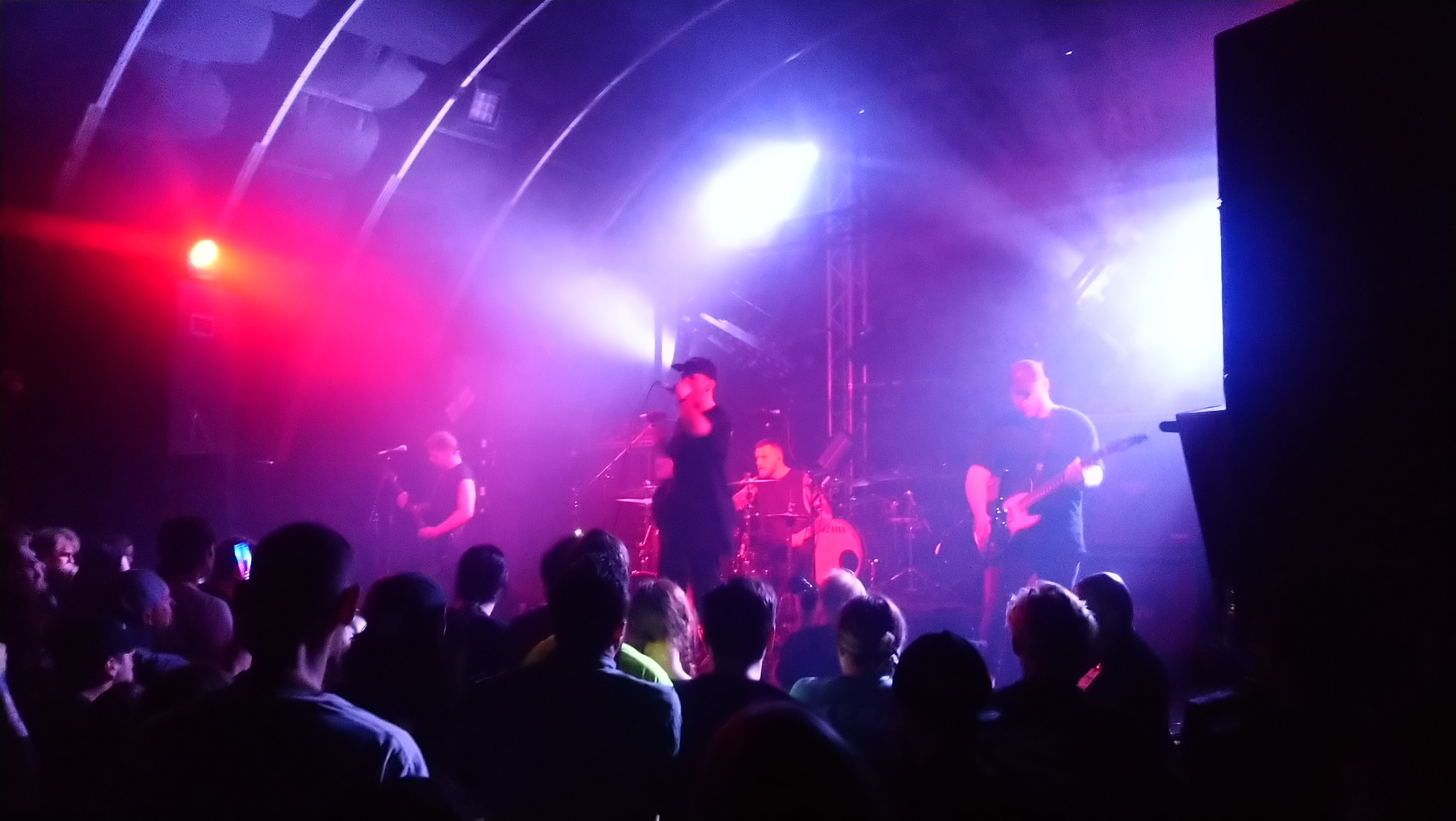
- Void of Vision performing in 2019

Background information
- Origin: Melbourne, Australia
- Genres: Metalcore; nu metal; industrial metal; alternative metal
- Years active: 2013–2025
- Label: UNFD
- Past members: Matt Thompson; Jack Bergin; James McKendrick; Mitch Fairlie; George Pfaendner
- Website: voidofvision.com

Void of Vision were an Australian metalcore band from Melbourne, formed in 2013. The band's final lineup consisted of vocalist Jack Bergin, guitarists James McKendrick and Mitch Fairlie and drummer George Pfaendner. Void of Vision have released four studio albums: Children of Chrome (2016), Hyperdaze (2019), Chronicles (2023), and What I'll Leave Behind (2024). The band broke up following a farewell tour in mid-February 2025 and a final one-off show in July.

== History ==
=== Early years and Children of Chrome (2013–2016) ===
Void of Vision was formed in April 2013 by Jack Bergin on vocals, James McKendrick & Mitch Fairlie on guitar, George Pfaendner on drums and Matt Thompson on bass. In May of that year the band released a debut self-published two-track Reflect // Revolt on Bandcamp.

In 2014, the band caught the public's attention when they released the music video for their first single "Life//Blood" on 16 April. By the end of the year Void of Vision had performed three national tours. Their debut EP, Broken // Bones, was released in October and was named Blunt Magazine's EP of the Year for 2014. On 27 December, Void of Vision released a new music video for their track "Persist // Perceive" from their EP, Broken // Bones, featuring Mason Bunt from the band Pridelands. The video contained live footage from Void of Vision's performance at The Resolve Tour with Hand of Mercy and Hellions.

On 5 March 2015, a music video for their track "Nightmare" was released before the Indian Summer Tour supporting Hellions. On 18 June, Void of Vision released a new single "Sunrise" alongside an accompanying music video.

In 2016, the band was signed on to the UNFD record label and later that year released the singles, "//" and "Ctrl Freak". Their debut studio album Children of Chrome followed on 30 September.

=== Disturbia and Thompson's departure (2017–2018) ===
In February 2017, Void of Vision marked their first international tour supporting Chelsea Grin on the Self Inflicted European Tour. On 9 November, the single "Ghost in the Machine" was released alongside an accompanying music video. Their second EP, Disturbia, was released a day later under UNFD. The band recorded a rendition of the 1995 song "Israel's Son" by Silverchair for Spawn (Again), a tribute album to Silverchair released on 17 November. From 17 to 25 November, Void of Vision co-headlined with Wollongong metalcore band Graves for their farewell tour. They performed at venues across Brisbane, Newcastle, Sydney, Wollongong, Adelaide and Melbourne. On 11 December, bassist Matt Thompson played his last show with the band before leaving for unknown reasons.

On 12 January 2018, Disturbia received a limited physical release of 500 vinyl EPs. On 29 November, Void of Vision released a new standalone single, "Kill All My Friends", alongside an accompanying music video. "Kill All My Friends" was described as being a new level for their sound, incorporating more industrial and experimental elements that frontman and vocalist Jack Bergin called "110% classic VOV with a new edge." In December, Void of Vision joined the lineup for the inaugural Good Things festival.

=== Hyperdaze (2019–2021) ===
On 28 June 2019, during an all ages show in Croydon, Void of Vision unveiled new music. On 23 July, their sophomore studio album Hyperdaze was announced alongside the new single "Hole in Me". The album was set to release on 13 September. On 16 August, Void of Vision released a cover of Slipknot's "Psychosocial" featuring Marcus Bridge of Northlane, Sean Harmanis from Make Them Suffer, and Ryan Siew from Polaris. The cover was included on the Slipknot cover compilation album, March of the Maggots, by Metal Hammer magazine. On 3 September, Void of Vision released their second single, "Babylon". On 9 September, their third single, "If Only", was released alongside an accompanying music video. On 14 September, they performed in the Amity Affliction's mini-festival Heaven & Hell. From October to December 2019, Void of Vision joined Northlane on their Australian and European legs of their Alien World Tour.

On 9 July 2020, the band released a music video for "Decay", the fourth single from Hyperdaze. The music video was created by the AV Club on no budget and was completely home-made. In a press statement, Bergin revealed that as his rental lease was finishing up they were left with an empty house to shoot the video in.

On 5 February 2021, Void of Vision teamed up with label-mate Thornhill's lead singer Jacob Charlton for a re-imagined version of "Year of the Rat" and also released a new music video. Later that month, they teamed up with Ecca Vandal for a new version of "Decay". The band are also expected to join the Amity Affliction on their Everyone Loves You… Once You Leave Them Australian Album Tour. These reimagined tracks were later revealed to be part of Hyperdaze (Redux) a remix album released on 5 March.

=== Chronicles (2021–2023) ===
On 3 September, Void of Vision released a new single titled "The Lonely People". A music video accompanied the released track. On 20 October, another single, "VAMPYR" was released, with an accompanying music video. Void of Vision announced simultaneously that an EP would be released on 22 October, titled Chronicles I: Lust. The EP was then released on the aforementioned date, containing 4 tracks, including single releases, "The Lonely People" and "VAMPYR". Chronicles I: Lust will be the start of an ongoing series of EPs yet to be written.

On 21 February 2022, Void of Vision released the new single, "Dominatrix", which was a slightly different endeavor for their sound. A second single, "Into the Dark" was released on 4 April alongside the announcement of their upcoming EP in the Chronicle series. On 29 April, their second EP in the series Chronicles II: Heaven was released. It featured the two previously released singles, as well as three additional tracks. The track "Altar" featured vocals from Creeper vocalist, Hannah Greenwood. On 18 October, a new single "Hell Hell Hell" was released. On 11 November the band surprise released the third and final EP in the series, Chronicles III: Underworld, which included the single previously released as well two additional songs.

On 17 February 2023, Void of Vision released the Chronicles studio album, compiling all three EPs together. In March, Void of Vision joined the lineup for the inaugural Australian Knotfest festival. In April the band announced an Australian Headline tour with Like Moths To Flames, Varials & Annalynn, shortly afterwards vocalist Jack Bergin was hospitalised with a ruptured cerebral arteriovenous malformation, leaving the band to pull out of their scheduled performance at Unify Gathering Off The Record.

=== What I'll Leave Behind and break up (2024–2025) ===
In October the band returned with the release of the single "Angel Of Darkness" announcing tours in North America/Canada with Invent, Animate and Europe/United Kingdom with Stray From The Path.

In June 2024, the band announced that a new album What I'll Leave Behind will be released on 20 September 2024. On November 14, the band announced that they will break up following a final headline tour in Australia in February 2025. The final show took place on 22 February at the Magnet House in Perth. The band's decision to split comes after reflecting on their decade-long journey, feeling they've accomplished everything they set out to achieve and reached a fulfilling end. Their focus is now on personal growth and moving forward, while celebrating their legacy with a final tour to honour their career. After their main headlining Farewell Tour, the band announced an additional final show in their home town of Melbourne scheduled for 5 July at The Forum.

== Musical style ==
Void of Vision has been described as taking their musical influences from bands such as Northlane, Architects, Meshuggah and others. Their genre has been described as metalcore, nu metal, and industrial. Their live performances have been described as being aggressive and erratic.

They cited influences including Memphis May Fire, Being as an Ocean, Skrillex, Nine Inch Nails and the Prodigy.

== Members ==
Final lineup

- Jack Bergin – unclean vocals (2013–2025), clean vocals (2022–2025)
- James McKendrick – lead guitar, clean vocals (2013–2025)
- Mitch Fairlie – rhythm guitar (2013–2025)
- George Pfaendner – drums (2013–2025)

Former

- Matt Thompson – bass guitar, backing vocals (2013–2017)

Timeline

== Discography ==
=== Studio albums ===
List of studio albums
Title	Album details	Peak chart positions
Title	Album details	AUS
Children of Chrome	Released: 30 September 2016; Label: UNFD; Format: CD, digital download, streaming	54
Hyperdaze	Released: 13 September 2019; Label: UNFD; Format: CD, LP, digital download, streaming	— (Note: Hyperdaze did not enter the Australian Top 100 Albums Chart but did peak at number 36 on the Australian Digital Albums Chart, and at number 7 on the Top 20 Vinyl Albums Chart.)
Chronicles	Released: 17 February 2023; Label: UNFD; Format: CD, LP, digital download, streaming	—
What I'll Leave Behind	Released: 20 September 2024; Label: UNFD; Format: CD, LP, digital download, streaming	—

=== Remix albums ===
List of extended plays
Title	Album details
Hyperdaze (Redux)	Released: 5 March 2021; Label: UNFD; Format: Digital download, streaming

=== Extended plays ===
List of extended plays
Title	EP details
Broken // Bones	Released: 30 October 2014; Label: Self-released; Format: Digital download, streaming
Disturbia	Released: 10 November 2017; Label: UNFD; Format: EP, digital download, streaming
Chronicles I: Lust	Released: 22 October 2021; Label: UNFD; Format: EP, digital download, streaming
Chronicles II: Heaven	Released: 29 April 2022; Label: UNFD; Format: EP, digital download, streaming
Chronicles III: Underworld	Released: 11 November 2022; Label: UNFD; Format: EP, digital download, streaming

=== Singles ===
Title	Year	Album
"Kill All My Friends"	2018	Non-album single
"Angel of Darkness"	2023	What I'll Leave Behind
"Empty"	2024	What I'll Leave Behind
"Gamma Knife"	2024	What I'll Leave Behind
"Blood For Blood"	2024	What I'll Leave Behind

=== Album appearances ===
List of album appearances
Title	Year	Album
"Israel's Son"	2017	Spawn (Again): A Tribute to Silverchair
"Psychosocial" (feat. Marcus Bridge, Sean Harmanis & Ryan Siew)	2019	March of the Maggots
"Eyes Wide Shut" (PhaseOne & Void Of Vision)	2023	PhaseOne x UNFD - EP

== Awards and nominations ==
=== AIR Awards ===
The Australian Independent Record Awards (commonly known informally as AIR Awards) is an annual awards night to recognise, promote and celebrate the success of Australia's Independent Music sector.

Year	Nominee / work	Award	Result	Ref.
2022	Chronicles I: Lust	Best Independent Heavy Album or EP	Nominated	
2024	Chronicles	Best Independent Heavy Album or EP	Nominated	
