= Fluorescent Black (album) =

Studio album by Antipop Consortium
- Released: September 28, 2009
- Genre: Hip-hop
- Length: 55:10
- Label: Big Dada
- Producers: Beans; High Priest; M. Sayyid; Earl Blaize; Alter Ego; MegMan

Antipop Consortium chronology
Antipop vs. Matthew Shipp (2003)	Fluorescent Black (2009)

Fluorescent Black is a studio album by American hip-hop group Antipop Consortium. It was released on Big Dada on September 28, 2009.

== Critical reception ==
Professional ratings
Aggregate scores
Source	Rating
Metacritic	79/100
Review scores
Source	Rating
AllMusic	4.5/5 stars
BBC	favorable
Clash	8/10
Drowned in Sound	8/10
Exclaim!	favorable
MusicOMH	4/5 stars
Pitchfork	7.0/10
PopMatters	8/10 stars
Spin	favorable

At Metacritic, which assigns a weighted average score out of 100 to reviews from mainstream critics, the album received an average score of 79, based on 13 reviews, indicating "generally favorable reviews".

John Bush of AllMusic gave the album 4.5 out of 5 stars, calling it "one of the best rap records of the year." Thomas Quinlan of Exclaim! said, "Fluorescent Black is an exciting, energetic return for a group long overdue for a new release, and it might just be the best Anti-Pop Consortium album to date." Adam Park of Clash gave the album an 8 out of 10, describing it as "a futuristic blueprint that will subtly define the coming decade's urban landscape."

Dan LeRoy of Dallas Observer included it on the "Best Hip-Hop of 2009" list.

== Track listing ==
No.	Title	Length
1.	"Lay Me Down"	3:52
2.	"New Jack Exterminator"	4:22
3.	"Reflections"	3:28
4.	"Shine"	2:27
5.	"C Thru U"	2:10
6.	"Volcano"	3:06
7.	"Timpani"	4:09
8.	"The Solution"	3:20
9.	"Get Lite"	3:28
10.	"NY to Tokyo" (featuring Roots Manuva)	3:26
11.	"Superunfrontable"	4:01
12.	"Born Electric"	3:00
13.	"Apparently"	2:28
14.	"End Game"	2:17
15.	"Capricorn One"	3:10
16.	"Dragunov"	1:28
17.	"Fluorescent Black"	4:56
Total length:		55:10

== Personnel ==
Credits adapted from liner notes.

Antipop Consortium

- Beans – vocals, production
- High Priest – vocals, production
- M. Sayyid – vocals, production
- Earl Blaize – production, engineering, mixing

Additional musicians

- Dolphin – guitar (1, 3, 12)
- MegMan – bass guitar (1, 3, 4), synthesizer (1, 6), production (11)
- Alter Ego – production (4)
- Celina Gray – vocals (4)
- Leslie Klyachman – vocals (4)
- Kristina Zubkova – vocals (4)
- Michael Figaro – vocals (6)
- David Nelson – vocals (9)
- La Sonya Gunter – vocals (9, 11, 12)
- Roots Manuva – vocals (10)
- Shawn Keys – keyboards (12), strings (12)
- Mr Live – vocals (15)

Technical personnel

- Dan Huron – recording (12, 17)
- Tony Dawsey – mastering
- Ron Croudy – design
- Mark Evans – illustration
- Timothy Saccenti – photography
