= Brazen Heart =

Studio album by Dave Douglas
- Released: October 2, 2015
- Recorded: February 3, 2015
- Studio: The Bunker, Brooklyn
- Genre: Jazz
- Length: 1:04:00
- Label: Greenleaf GRECD 1044
- Producer: Dave Douglas

Dave Douglas chronology
High Risk (2015)	Brazen Heart (2015)	Dark Territory (2016)

Professional ratings
Review scores
Source	Rating
The Absolute Sound	3.5/5 stars
All About Jazz	5/5 stars
Allmusic	4/5 stars
The Irish Times	4/5 stars
Financial Times	4/5 stars

Brazen Heart is a studio album by American trumpeter Dave Douglas which was released in October 2015 on Douglas's own Greenleaf Music label. The album bears a dedication to Douglas’s older brother, Damon, who died in June 2015 after a long fight with cancer.

== Reception ==
Cormac Larkin of Irish Times stated "Ever the innovator, trumpeter Dave Douglas’s latest release, through his own Greenleaf label, is another brave attempt to change the way we consume music... Nothing beats the live experience, especially when it comes to improvisation, but these releases of entire live sets come a close second".

Mark Milano of The Absolute Sound wrote "Douglas’ style here is restless and engaged in the moment in a way that reveals his time spent in less explicitly jazz-rooted free improvisation, favoring long lines with a soft attack and rarely lingering on a single note, while the writing and interplay provide a 1960s modern jazz backdrop and enough information to reward many listens. Jon Irabagon offers the other main voice on tenor, always melodic and at times fragile in a way that blends well into a group sound that is consistently more than the sum of its parts. The sound quality is high, providing a good example of how acoustic music can be recorded in a close-up manner without sacrificing the ambience of the room".

== Track listing ==
No.	Title	Writer(s)	Length
1.	"Brazen Heart"	Douglas	7:24
2.	"Deep River"	Traditional	3:59
3.	"Hawaiian Punch"	Douglas	7:32
4.	"Inure Phase"	Douglas	5:38
5.	"Lone Wolf"	Douglas	2:55
6.	"Miracle Gro"	Douglas	8:17
7.	"Ocean Spray"	Douglas	5:24
8.	"Pyrrhic Apology"	Douglas	7:34
9.	"There Is a Balm in Gilead"	Traditional	6:23
10.	"Variable Current"	Douglas	4:22
11.	"Wake Up Claire"	Douglas	5:33
Total length:			1:04:00

== Personnel ==
Quintet

- Dave Douglas – trumpet, liner notes, producer
- Jon Irabagon – sax (tenor)
- Matt Mitchell – piano
- Linda Oh – bass
- Rudy Royston – drums

Production

- Margaret Derose – cover photo
- Viktor E. Frankl – quotation author
- Christoph Green – photography
- Tyler McDiarmid – mastering, mixing
- Aaron Nevezie – engineer
- Neal Shaw – assistant
- Eve Trojanov – back cover photo
- Jim Tuerk – package design
