= Shock City Maverick =

Studio album by Beans
- Released: October 18, 2004
- Genre: Hip hop
- Length: 39:22
- Label: Warp
- Producer: Beans

Beans chronology
Tomorrow Right Now (2003)	Shock City Maverick (2004)	Thorns (2008)

Professional ratings
Aggregate scores
Source	Rating
Metacritic	65/100
Review scores
Source	Rating
AllMusic	3/5 stars
Pitchfork	6.8/10
PopMatters	5/10 stars
Stylus Magazine	C+

Shock City Maverick is a 2004 studio album by American rapper Beans, released on Warp.

== Critical reception ==
At Metacritic, which assigns a weighted average score out of 100 to reviews from mainstream critics, Shock City Maverick received an average score of 65% based on 18 reviews, indicating "generally favorable reviews".

Derek Miller of Pitchfork gave the album a 6.8 out of 10, commenting that "Beans always had a tendency to reach hard for coffee-shop poesie, but his brash schoolboy taunts sink past angstful overextension." Stefan Braidwood of PopMatters gave the album 5 stars out of 10, saying, "His beats continue to be hypnotically bare-boned, old skool synth assault platforms, over which he then reels you in with his ceaseless syllabic slurry, his lyrics almost irrelevant as his ridiculous flow blurs everything into an inescapable rhythm."

== Track listing ==
No.	Title	Length
1.	"Light of the Damned"	1:33
2.	"Papercut"	2:30
3.	"Blind Driver"	2:31
4.	"Shards of Glass"	3:26
5.	"You're Dead, Let's Disco"	4:23
6.	"City Hawk"	2:56
7.	"Shock City Maverick"	3:03
8.	"Death by Sophistication"	2:48
9.	"Interval"	2:42
10.	"Down by Law"	3:04
11.	"A Force on Edge"	3:50
12.	"I'll Melt You"	2:52
13.	"Diamond Halo Granade"	3:44
