= Appetite for Disctruction =

Studio album by Funkstörung
- Released: April 25, 2000
- Genre: IDM
- Length: 59:54
- Label: Studio !K7
- Producer: Funkstörung

Funkstörung chronology
Additional Productions (1999)	Appetite for Disctruction (2000)	Vice Versa (2001)

Appetite for Disctruction is the debut studio album by the German IDM duo Funkstörung. It was released on Studio !K7 on April 25, 2000.

== Background ==
In 1999, Funkstörung received international critical praise with Additional Productions, which included remixes for acts like Björk and Wu-Tang Clan. In the next year, the duo released the debut studio album, Appetite for Disctruction, on Studio !K7. Five years in the making, it features vocal contributions from MC Triple H and singers Greenwood and Carin.

== Critical reception ==
Professional ratings
Review scores
Source	Rating
AllMusic	4.5/5 stars
Exclaim!	favorable
Igloo Magazine	favorable
NME	6/10
Wired	favorable

Brian Musich of AllMusic said, "Funkstörung creates an aural world of maddeningly complex soundscapes." CMJ New Music Report called it "the music Afrika Bambaataa might have created were he inspired by Autechre instead of Kraftwerk."

== Track listing ==
No.	Title	Length
1.	"Test"	4:31
2.	"Appetite for Disctruction"	5:18
3.	"Try Dried Frogs"	4:56
4.	"Sounds Like a Breakrecord" (featuring Triple H)	4:07
5.	"Grammy Winners" (featuring Triple H)	3:13
6.	"A8 KM34"	4:35
7.	"Think!" (featuring Greenwood)	3:21
8.	"I/O" (featuring Carin)	3:14
9.	"Red Shirt, White Shoes" (featuring Carin)	4:26
10.	"A Bottle, a Box and a Mic"	4:29
11.	"Mind the Gap"	17:44
