= Antipop Consortium =

American alternative hip-hop group

- Also known as: Tri-Pinnacle
- Origin: New York City, New York, United States
- Genres: Hip-hop, experimental, IDM
- Years active: 1997–2002, 2007–present
- Labels: Thirsty Ear, Warp, 75 Ark, Big Dada
- Members: High Priest; M. Sayyid; Earl Blaize
- Past members: Beans
- Website: warp.net/artists/anti-pop-consortium/

Antipop Consortium is an American alternative hip-hop group. The group formed in 1997, when Beans, High Priest, M. Sayyid, and producer Earl Blaize met at a poetry slam in New York City. They are notable for their stream-of-consciousness lyrics and musical references to contemporary composition methods.

== History ==
The group released several tape singles and two albums primarily on Dan the Automator's experimental hip-hop label 75 Ark before being signed by Warp Records in 2000. Their releases were met with mixed reviews from the mainstream music and underground hip-hop press alike, although they are noted for their inventiveness and the experimental electronic productions contributed by all members. They were frequently compared to other rappers with unorthodox lyrics, such as Kool Keith, MF Doom and Aesop Rock. In 2001, they opened for Radiohead during the European leg of their Amnesiac tour and subsequently toured with DJ Shadow.

The group disbanded due to creative differences in August 2002, with Beans pursuing a solo career while High Priest and M. Sayyid formed Airborn Audio, which released a single album, Good Fortune, on Ninja Tune in 2005, and toured with The Faint and Bright Eyes. All three members have pursued solo projects since the group's breakup.

Antipop completed their third album before they broke up, released in February 2003 as Antipop Consortium vs. Matthew Shipp.

They reunited in 2007. In an August 2007 interview, the four members stated that they reunited with the intention of touring and releasing a new record.

They played a reunion show at the Knitting Factory of New York City in March 2008 and formed part of the support for Public Enemy on the It Takes A Nation Of Millions To Hold Us Back Don't Look Back British tour in May 2008. They have played at the 2009 ATP VS the Fans festival in Minehead, UK, followed by the Incubate Festival in Tilburg, Netherlands the following week.

After releasing their reunion album Fluorescent Black on Big Dada Records in 2009, the group has been touring steadily. Playing shows in Pontiac, Michigan; Futuresonic at Urbis in Manchester, UK (May 14, 2009), as well as appearing at the South By Southwest Music Festival in Austin, Texas in 2010. After playing at SXSW they played at the Incubate in Tilburg, Netherlands in September 2009.

== Discography ==
Albums

- The Isolationist (1999) (with DJ Vadim, as The Isolationist)
- Tragic Epilogue (2000)
- Shopping Carts Crashing (2001)
- Arrhythmia (2002)
- Antipop vs. Matthew Shipp (2003) (with Matthew Shipp)
- Fluorescent Black (2009)

EPs

- The Ends Against the Middle (2001)

Singles

- "Disorientation" (1997)
- "Band-Aids for Bulletholes" (1997)
- "Hydrogen Slush" (1998) (with DJ Vadim, as The Isolationist)
- "Diagonal Ryme Garganchula" (2000)
- "Diagonal Ryme Garganchula 2.0" (2000) (as Tri-Pinnacle)
- "Lift" (2000)
- "Fear" (2000) (with Kaos and Patrick Pulsinger)
- "What Am I?" (2000)
- "Ghostlawns" (2002)
- "Volcano" (2009)

Guest appearances

- DJ Dee Nasty - "The Looking Glass" from Nastyness (2001)
- Bill Laswell - "Staple Nex" and "Broken Toenail Gland" from Points of Order (2001)
- Techno Animal - "Glass Prism Enclosure" from The Brotherhood of the Bomb (2001)
- DJ Krush - "Supreme Team" from The Message at the Depth (2002)
- Ghost Cauldron - "Fear" from Invent Modest Fires (2003)
- Tobacco - "TV All Greasy" from LA UTI (2010)
- Modeselektor - "Humanized" from Monkeytown (2011)

Remixes

- Attica Blues - "3ree (A Means to Be) (What Boundaries? Remix)" (1997)
- Secret Frequency Crew - "Deep Blue (Anti-Pop Consortium Remix)" (2001)
- DJ Logic - "French Quarter (Antipop Consortium Remix) from Remixed (2002)
- Perera Elsewhere - "Bongoloid (Antipop Consortium Remix)" from Everlast (Deluxe Edition) (2014)
