= Additional Productions =

Remix album by Funkstörung
- Released: May 1999
- Genre: IDM
- Length: 42:22
- Label: !K7 Records
- Producer: Michael Fakesch and Christian de Luca

Funkstörung chronology
| Additional Productions (1999) | Appetite for Disctruction (2000) |

Professional ratings
Review scores
| Source | Rating |
|---|---|
| Allmusic | 4/5 stars |

Additional Productions is the first album-length release of the German IDM group Funkstörung, and also the first on their current label, !K7 Records. It is not strictly an album, since it only contains remixes of other artists done by Funkstörung, but since there is seldom more than parts of the vocals of the original songs left, it is often classified as an album proper nonetheless. The booklet, designed by The Designers Republic, features a complete Funkstörung corporate identity manual, including painting schemes for planes, boats and buildings. There is a very limited (100 copies) grey 180g vinyl edition of this album, which contains three additional remixes ("Galaxy" by War, Funckarma's "Spatial Convolution", and the second "All Is Full of Love" remix from björkmitfunkstörung), but omits "Bust It".

== Track listing ==
1. Visit Venus – "Children Of The Rave Solution" (Visited By Funkstörung) – 4:54
2. East Flatbush Project – "Tried By 12" (Tried By Funkstörung) – 5:34
3. Various Artists – "No. 9" (No.9,5 By Funkstörung) – 4:42
4. Björk – "All Is Full of Love" (In Love With Funkstörung Remix) – 5:25
5. Finitribe – "Mind My Make Up" (Made Up By Funkstörung) – 4:06
6. DJ Craze mit Funkstörung – "Bust It" – 4:37 (regular editions only)
7. Wu-Tang Clan – "Reunited" (Reunixed By Funkstörung) – 4:28
8. S'Apex – "Henryk" (Synkopic Reprogrammed By Funkstörung) – 4:36

== Limited edition bonus tracks ==
- Funckarma – "Spatial Convolution" (Morphed By Funkstörung)
- Björk – "All Is Full of Love" (Secondotted By Funkstörung)
- War – "Galaxy" (Funkstörung Declared War-Remix)
