= Lineage (Shigeto album) =

Studio album by Shigeto
- Released: January 31, 2012
- Length: 29:04
- Label: Ghostly International
- Producer: Zachary Saginaw

Shigeto chronology
Full Circle (2010)	Lineage (2012)	No Better Time Than Now (2013)

Lineage is a mini-album by American musician Zachary Shigeto Saginaw under the mononym Shigeto. It was released on January 31, 2012, through Ghostly International. It received generally favorable reviews from critics.

== Background ==
Zachary Shigeto Saginaw, known mononymously as Shigeto, is an American musician originally from Ann Arbor, Michigan. Lineage is a follow-up to his debut studio album, Full Circle (2010), and is a mini-album consisting of eight tracks. After finishing Full Circle, he bought a Rhodes piano, a kalimba, a harp, a Moog synthesizer, and percussive instruments. In a 2012 interview, he said, "[I am] trying to focus on building my studio, focusing on acoustic instruments or just hardware, rather than buying new MIDI pads."

Shigeto is a Japanese American. His grandparents and great-grandparents were sent to the internment camps during World War II, after the attack on Pearl Harbor. The album's front cover features a photograph of his great-grandfather's house in Hiroshima, circa 1916. Its back cover features a photograph of the said man, taken at the Amache Internment Camp in Granada, Colorado, during the internment of Japanese Americans.

Shigeto later released an EP, Huron River Drive (2012), which contains remixes of the track "Huron River Drive" by Evenings, Sun Hammer, Braille, and Sun Glitters.

== Critical reception ==
Professional ratings
Aggregate scores
Source	Rating
Metacritic	66/100
Review scores
Source	Rating
Pitchfork	6.8/10
PopMatters	6/10
Resident Advisor	3.5/5

According to the review aggregator Metacritic, Lineage received "generally favorable reviews" based on a weighted average score of 66 out of 100 from 4 critic scores.

Vincent Pollard of Exclaim! stated, "Despite the different styles explored, from hip-hop to funk and folk, the jazz influence and carefully restrained sound palette hold it together as a fully cohesive album throughout its 29-minute lifespan." He added, "With its hypnotic loops and acoustic percussion, this great downtempo record, at times, calls to mind a looser, dreamier Teebs, with the melodic sense of early Four Tet." Sam Louis of Resident Advisor wrote, "In contrast to his aforementioned contemporaries [Teebs and Shlohmo], Shigeto's Lineage feels more full-bodied and cohesive, even if the sound palette is similar in many ways."

Duncan Cooper of The Fader stated, "While the internment camp artwork suggests Saginaw is unpacking some deep darkness, the album's perfectly serene." Larry Fitzmaurice of Pitchfork commented that "Lineage's clean style and easily admirable sound might seem refreshing when taken into context with the teeming pot of acid-stained, bunk-bed J Dilla imitators that continue to clog up RSS feeds with poorly-tagged MP3s and 1980s-sitcom-referencing artwork, but the fact of the matter is that Lineage isn't the first record to sound like Lineage." Benjamin Aspray of PopMatters called Lineage "a step back for Shigeto in an apparent attempt at progress." He added, "The relative rawness of Full Circle has been streamlined seemingly in the interest of dexterity and a mellower mood, with the effect of eliminating some of that earlier album's subtle power."

== Track listing ==
All tracks are written by Zachary Saginaw.

Lineage track listing
No.	Title	Length
1.	"Lineage (Prologue)"	2:55
2.	"Lineage"	3:08
3.	"Ann Arbor Part 3 & 4"	4:21
4.	"Soaring"	3:38
5.	"A Child's Mind"	4:14
6.	"Huron River Drive"	2:39
7.	"Field Day"	4:17
8.	"Please Stay"	3:52
Total length:		29:04

== Personnel ==
Credits adapted from liner notes.

- Zachary Saginaw – production
- Michael Cina – artwork
