= Queen of Japan (band) =

German synthpop band

- Origin: Munich, Germany
- Genres: Synthpop
- Years active: 1999–present
- Members: Koneko; Jo Ashito; Jason Arigato

Queen of Japan is a German music trio from Munich, Germany, known for its synthpop sound and cover versions of hits from the 1970s and 1980s.

== Career ==
Queen of Japan's 1999 debut EP Mercury Rising (a reference to Freddie Mercury) features new wave-sounding versions of Queen songs and is probably the basis for the group's name.

The trio's versions of "I Love Rock 'n' Roll" and "Da Ya Think I'm Sexy?" (originally hits for Joan Jett and Rod Stewart, respectively) appear on several different compilation CDs. Their version of "I Was Made for Loving You" (a hit for Kiss) was featured on the award-winning short movie Icicle Melt starring Greta Scacchi.

Some of their cover songs, such as "Mother" (written and originally recorded by John Lennon) and "Wanted Man" (written by Bob Dylan for Johnny Cash) infuse an electronic sound into songs that previously had a different style. They have also covered songs by Soft Cell, The Who, Olivia Newton-John, Marvin Gaye, Duran Duran, Thin Lizzy, Klaus Nomi and Frank Zappa.

Remixes of Queen of Japan's work have appeared on a CD by DJ Keoki. Their music has also been featured at Fashion Week and appears on two CDs of music thereof.

One reviewer writes:

Queen of Japan [...] manage to inject their brand of sleazy sexuality into this revivalist template. I can’t say this is original stuff, but in all its worrying energy and zany spunk, it’s actually quite a lot of fun. At times it even reminds me of Blondie (which is a good thing!) if their over-reliance on cheesy retro sounds was curbed slightly, they might even stumble across a decent track every once in a while.

A review for the CD Foreign Politics describes:

You'd think that after the success of the sex-citing cover CD Head-Rush, (an album of full of electric-socket boogie-nights versions, which could be mistakingly [sic] described as electroclash) [...] the glitter-spangled threesome [...] would carry on playing the high-voltage karaoke-sex-machine for a generation who grew up between Saturday Night Fever & Flashdance, Repo Man & Alien [...] But Queen of Japan are not just your run-of-the-mill cheeky anarchistic electro-karaoke dandies [...but are instead] A tour de force in discology."

== Identity ==
As is often the case with artists on the electronic music scene, the identity of Queen of Japan is more complex than casual inquiry reveals. Neither their official website nor their page on My Space explains it. It is, however, an "open secret" and is discussed in interviews and on other websites.

Credited group members are Koneko (vocals), Jo Ashito (vocals, guitar) and Jason Arigato (bass guitar). Their website features the following description "translated from the japanese by arakiha miho":

The band naming their persons queen of Japan was not always in the threesome they hold to their beating hearts today [..] After many tours of hard sexual energy and costume change the queen of Japan became known well across country and town never giving in to a life of modest no glamour [...] Schools will replace sexual theory lessons with headrush album in order to save the money of tax pay. Queen of Japan influence politics and reforming. Everybody loves everybody and fun and feeling.

Despite the name of the band and the Japanese-sounding names (actually stage names) of its members, the group has no direct connections to Japan and no member of the trio is of Japanese ethnicity.

Catriona Shaw (a.k.a. Koneko, Miss le Bomb), a Scot and the youngest member of the band, is the lead singer and was hailed as a "new exceptional singer". The first Queen of Japan CD, Mercury Rising, only features Platzgumer and Shaw as a duo. Her vocal talents are also featured on the CD Miss Me, credited as "HP:CS" (Hans Platzgumer:Catriona Shaw), as well as with Electronicat.

Hans Platzgumer (a.k.a. Jo Ashito, Separator) is an Austrian-born musician and music producer and lead guitarist/backing singer. He was a co-founder (with Andi Pümpel) of the Grammy-nominated New York City band H.P. Zinker in the late 1980s and has been a member of the punk band Die Goldenen Zitronen (founded 1986 in Hamburg) since the late '90s. More recently, he has collaborated with other artists and released music under such codenames as Convertible, Aura Anthropica, Cube & Sphere, Fingerfood, and Shinto.

Albert Pöschl (a.k.a. Jason Arigato), Queen of Japan's bass player and co-producer, is from Bavaria and has a diverse portfolio as a musician and music producer. He has worked as a sound technician for various bands including Chicks on Speed and Die Goldenen Zitronen, which is presumably where he and Platzgumer made their acquaintance. He joined Queen of Japan in 1999, one year after they had formed.

== Discography ==
Queen of Japan's music is mostly available via European independent record labels. Some of their work was originally released on vinyl records (facilitating their use in dance mixes through traditional, non-digital DJing methods) but were later released as compact disks.

- Mercury Rising (1999), Angelika Koehlermann — compact disk
- I Was Made for Loving You (2000), Hausmusik — 12" vinyl
- Physical (2001), Echokammer — 12" vinyl
- Cool Cat/Total Eclipse (2001), Fortina — 10" vinyl
- Nightlife in Tokyo (2001), Erkrankung Durch Musique — vinyl LP
- Nightlife in Tokyo (2001), Angelika Koehlermann — compact disk; Re-released with additional material in 2006 as Tokyo Rising.
- Headrush (2002), Erkrankung Durch Musique — vinyl LP
- Headrush (2002), Echokammer — compact disk; released in Japan by Sausage Records
- Kings, Queens, Wasps & Lust (2003), QOJ — vinyl LP
- Foreign Politics (2004), Erkrankung Durch Musique — vinyl LP
- Foreign Politics (2004), Echokammer — compact disk
- Tokyo Risen (2006), Echokammer — compact disk

In addition, many Queen of Japan songs have appeared on compilations. For example, "Mother" appeared only on a Mother's Day compilation before its inclusion on Tokyo Rising, and "Wanted Man" is included on the tribute album Boy Named Sue: Johnny Cash Revisited.
