= Full Circle (Shigeto album) =

Studio album by Shigeto
- Released: November 9, 2010
- Genre: Electronic
- Length: 37:31
- Label: Ghostly International
- Producer: Shigeto

Shigeto chronology
Full Circle (2010)	Lineage (2012)

Full Circle is the debut studio album by American musician Zachary Shigeto Saginaw under the mononym Shigeto. It was released on November 9, 2010, through Ghostly International.

== Background ==
Zachary Shigeto Saginaw, known mononymously as Shigeto, is an American musician from Ann Arbor, Michigan. He previously released two EPs through Ghostly International: Semi Circle and What We Held On To. Full Circle is his debut album. It was released on November 9, 2010, through Ghostly International. He later released Full Circle Remixes (2011), which contains remixes by Mike Slott, Om Unit, Mux Mool, Samiyam, Take, Beautiful Bells, Charles Trees, and Mogi Grumbles.

== Critical reception ==
Professional ratings
Review scores
Source	Rating
AllMusic	3.5/5 stars
Drowned in Sound	8/10
Fact	3.5/5 stars
Resident Advisor	3.5/5

Andy Kellman of AllMusic described the album as "modern, melodic IDM -- home-listening electronic music that pulls from ambient techno, hip-hop, and the more challenging end of dubstep." Dom Gourlay of Drowned in Sound wrote, "Full Circle is an engaging, if complex record that certainly exudes its creator's public dislike of genre classification far and wide." Laurent Fintoni of Fact stated, "Full Circle is as good a debut as you could hope for from a talented producer that is likely to continue to grow and impress."

=== Accolades ===
Accolades for Full Circle
Publication	Year	List	Rank	Ref.
PopMatters	2020	The 10 Best Electronic Albums of 2010	8	

== Track listing ==
All tracks are written by Shigeto.

Full Circle track listing
No.	Title	Length
1.	"Ann Arbor Part 1"	4:07
2.	"Escape from the Incubator"	3:26
3.	"Relentless Drag"	4:07
4.	"So So Lovely"	2:43
5.	"Sky of the Revolution"	5:09
6.	"Brown Eyed Girl"	3:49
7.	"French Kiss Power Up"	3:47
8.	"Ann Arbor Part 2"	2:45
9.	"Children at Midnight"	2:34
10.	"Look at All the Smiling Faces"	5:02
Total length:		37:31

== Personnel ==
Credits adapted from liner notes.

- Shigeto – production
- Bryan Noll – guitar (5)
- Andrew Ferren – woodwind (10)
- Adam Landfair – woodwind (10)
- Adam E. Hunt – mastering
- Michael Cina – artwork
