= Disturbia (EP) =

2017 EP by Void of Vision

EP by Void of Vision
- Released: 10 November 2017
- Recorded: 2017
- Genre: Metalcore; hardcore
- Length: 11:17
- Label: UNFD
- Producer: Void of Vision; Drew Fulk

Void of Vision chronology
Children of Chrome (2016)	Disturbia (2017)	Hyperdaze (2019)

Singles from Disturbia
- 1. "Ghost in the Machine" Released: 9 November 2017

Disturbia is the second EP by Australian metalcore band Void of Vision, released on 10 November 2017 by UNFD. It is their first EP released under label. It was self-produced by the band with assistance from Drew Fulk. The EP did not feature bassist Matt Thompson despite his last performance being after its release.

== Background and promotion ==
On 9 November 2017, the single "Ghost in the Machine" was released alongside an accompanying music video. The EP was then released the next day. From 17 to 25 November, Void of Vision co-headlined with Wollongong metalcore band Graves for their farewell tour. They performed at venues across Brisbane, Newcastle, Sydney, Wollongong, Adelaide and Melbourne.

On 12 January 2018, Disturbia received a limited physical release of 500 vinyl EPs.

== Writing and composition ==
"Spite" was described as being a statement of "Look what you’ve done to you and I" and as "is waves of aggression with a certain someone being dealt a brutal serve." "Ghost in the Machine" is described as being about one's personal demons trying to stay hidden and self-reflection. "You Will Bring Me Down" chronicles a relationship gone sour and the need to erase everything about them. "Grey Area" was likened to giving a "You’re going to watch what you’ve done to me" vibe.

Speaking on how all the song's connect, vocalist Jack Bergin said: "There is no particular theme for the EP, this was really for an experience I wanted myself to have, seeking the hopeful relief of facing my own demons. In the most unselfish way possible, I wrote this EP for myself, because I needed to." The EP's genre has been described as metalcore and hardcore.

== Critical reception ==
Professional ratings
Review scores
Source	Rating
Beat	8/10
KillYourStereo	75/100
Metal Noise	8/10

The EP received positive reviews. Jonty Cornford from KillYourStereo in a mostly positive review said: "With two great tracks, one decent track and one disappointment, ‘Disturbia’ does fall short of expectations for me, but there is still a lot to be loved here." Beat magazine gave it a positive review and said: "Less surprising is that it meets these expectations with flying colours and manages to do so with just four songs." Metal Noise criticised it for being too short, however praising it: "at four songs it leaves you wanting more."

In a positive review from Depth magazine, Kel Burch said: "Void Of Vision have done an impressive job of keeping intensity high and messages sincere through the entire of Disturbia."

== Track listing ==
Track listing adapted from Spotify.

No.	Title	Writer(s)	Length
1.	"Spite"	Jack Bergin, James McKendrick	1:29
2.	"Ghost in the Machine"	Bergin, McKendrick, Jon Deiley, Sam Bassal	2:56
3.	"You Will Bring Me Down"	Drew Fulk, Bergin, McKendrick	3:15
4.	"Grey Area"	Bergin, McKendrick, Deiley, Bassal	3:37
Total length:			11:17

== Personnel ==
Credits adapted from Facebook.

Void of Vision

- Jack Bergin - unclean vocals
- James McKendrick - lead guitar, clean vocals
- Mitch Fairlie - rhythm guitar
- George Murphy - drums

Addition personnel

- Drew Fulk – production, mixing, mastering
- Jon Deiley – additional production
- Sam Bassal – additional production, recording
- Darren Oorloff – album artwork
