= High Risk (album) =

Studio album by Dave Douglas
- Released: June 23, 2015
- Recorded: October 10, 2014
- Studio: The Bunker, Brooklyn
- Genre: Jazz
- Length: 40:57
- Label: Greenleaf GRE-1042
- Producer: Dave Douglas

Dave Douglas chronology
Sound Prints (2015)	High Risk (2015)	Brazen Heart (2015)

High Risk is an album by trumpeter Dave Douglas that was released in June 2015 on Douglas' Greenleaf Music label.

== Reception ==
Professional ratings
Review scores
Source	Rating
AllMusic	4/5 stars
Pitchfork	7.6/10
PopMatters	8/10 stars

The AllMusic review awarded the album 4 stars out of 5, stating "While the hallucinatory nature of High Risk certainly brings to mind trumpeter Miles Davis' '70s and '80s electric period, Douglas smartly bucks direct comparisons by largely eschewing heavy effects on his own horn. He blends well into the band's soundscape, but continuously finds key moments for his trumpet's warm timbre to stand out". Pitchfork said "High Risk is not so much an album of jazz augmented by electronic instrumentation, but an album performed by players that are very conscious of and interested in electronic music. It's not just Saginaw dithering with a laptop, but also Guiliana mimicking delay trails on his kit or emulating the oddball swing of chopped and spliced rhythms. Over top, Douglas' playing is generally very mellow—reinforcing the ambient and meditative aspects of the music." PopMatters' John Garratt stated "High Risk is a most thorough mixture of jazz and electronic music because it’s difficult to definitively define it as either. ...Where one influence ends and another one begins is a mystery, and that’s what will guarantee High Risk's status as a wholly unique album. With any justice, it will also serve as a template for future electro-jazz".

== Track listing ==
All compositions by Dave Douglas

1. "Molten Sunset" - 7:32
2. "Household Item" - 4:23
3. "Etiquette" - 6:10
4. "First Things First" - 2:45
5. "High Risk" - 6:22
6. "Tied Together" - 6:35
7. "Cardinals" - 7:10

== Personnel ==
- Dave Douglas - trumpet
- Shigeto - electronics
- Jonathan Maron - electronic bass, synth bass
- Mark Guiliana - acoustic and electronic drums
