= No Better Time Than Now =

Studio album by Shigeto
- Released: August 20, 2013
- Length: 48:01
- Label: Ghostly International
- Producer: Zachary Saginaw

Shigeto chronology
Lineage (2012)	No Better Time Than Now (2013)	Intermission (2015)

No Better Time Than Now is a studio album by American musician Shigeto. It was released on August 20, 2013, through Ghostly International. It received generally favorable reviews from critics.

== Critical reception ==
Professional ratings
Aggregate scores
Source	Rating
Metacritic	78/100
Review scores
Source	Rating
AllMusic	4/5 stars
Exclaim!	8/10
Fact	3.5/5
God Is in the TV Zine	4.5/5 stars
Pitchfork	6.4/10
Resident Advisor	4/5
The Skinny	4/5 stars
Spin	6/10
Tiny Mix Tapes	4.5/5 stars
XLR8R	8.5/10

According to the review aggregator Metacritic, No Better Time Than Now received "generally favorable reviews" based on a weighted average score of 78 out of 100 from 9 critic scores.

Andy Kellman of AllMusic commented that "This is Saginaw's most colorful and accomplished release, and it indicates a vast range of individualistic possibilities for his next move." Vincent Pollard of Exclaim! stated, "In eschewing the heavily compressed electronic production du jour, Shigeto has found a sound that gives his compositions ample space to breathe."

=== Accolades ===
Year-end lists for No Better Time Than Now
Publication	List	Rank	Ref.
XLR8R	Best Releases of 2013	25	

== Track listing ==
All tracks are written by Zachary Saginaw.

No Better Time Than Now track listing
No.	Title	Length
1.	"First Saturn Return"	2:13
2.	"Detroit Part 1"	4:51
3.	"Ringleader"	6:01
4.	"Perfect Crime"	5:14
5.	"Olivia"	3:08
6.	"Miss U"	5:42
7.	"Ritual Howl"	4:24
8.	"Soul Searching"	5:31
9.	"Safe in Here"	2:48
10.	"No Better Time Than Now"	4:45
11.	"Silver Lining"	3:22
Total length:		48:01

Expanded edition bonus track
No.	Title	Length
12.	"Tell a Tale"	4:18
Total length:		52:19

== Personnel ==
Credits adapted from liner notes.

- Zachary Saginaw – production, mixing
- Christopher Koltay – mixing
- Matt Colton – mastering
- Michael Cina – artwork
