= One/Three =

Studio album by Dabrye
- Released: June 11, 2001
- Length: 35:27
- Label: Ghostly International; Iris
- Producer: Tadd Mullinix

Dabrye chronology
One/Three (2001)	Instrmntl (2002)

Professional ratings
Review scores
Source	Rating
Allmusic	link

One/Three is the first album released by American electronic musician Tadd Mullinix, under the name Dabrye.

== Track listing ==
1. "The Lish" – (3:57)
2. "We've Got Commodity" – (2:35)
3. "With a Professional" – (3:51)
4. "I'm Missing You" – (3:47)
5. "How Many Times (With This)" – (3:51)
6. "Truffle No Shuffle" – (3:28)
7. "Hyped-Up Plus Tax" – (3:39)
8. "Smoking the Edge" – (3:15)
9. "So Scientific" – (3:52)
10. "Hot Mating Ritual" – (3:12)
