= Disturbia (score) =

Disturbia: Original Motion Picture Score

Soundtrack album by Geoff Zanelli
- Released: April 10, 2007
- Genres: Score; Classical music
- Length: 46:08
- Label: Lakeshore
- Producer: Geoff Zanelli

Geoff Zanelli chronology
Into the West (2005)	Disturbia: Original Motion Picture Score (2007)	Hitman (2007)

Disturbia: Original Motion Picture Score is a score to the film of the same name directed by D. J. Caruso. It is composed by Geoff Zanelli, conducted by Bruce Fowler, performed by the Hollywood Studio Symphony and produced by Skip Williamson. It was released on July 10, 2007 in the United States and Canada by Lakeshore Records.

== Reception ==
Professional ratings
Review scores
Source	Rating
AllMusic	2.5/5 stars
Tracksounds	4/10 stars
Movie Music UK	2/4 stars

Disturbia: Original Motion Picture Score received generally mixed reviews from most music critics. A review in AllMusic wrote: "For his score to the 2007 surprise hit thriller Disturbia, composer Geoff Zanelli created moody, nuanced orchestral pieces that both heighten the film's drama and reveal a delicate sensitivity. With its elegant and evocative tracks, this album marks Zanelli as a promising film-score composer, and works as an excellent counterpoint to the eclectic, pop-oriented Disturbia soundtrack."

Cap Stewart of Tracksounds.com gave the score a mixed-to-negative review, he wrote: "The film's primary motif, appropriately laced with sinisterness, opens the album and sets the listener in the proper mood. Unfortunately, he doesn't stay there long. Beginning with "Fishing", Zanelli introduces some material designed to portray the more lighthearted side of suburban life. It's not bad music, per se, but it doesn't meld well with the overall tone of the storyline. Adding to this problem is the utilization of a pop/rock sound during other moments on the album. It's almost as if Zanelli is trying to combine the tone of The 'Burbs with Friday the 13th—but it just doesn't work. If he had focused more attention on developing the sinister side of the score, it might have provided for a more effective listening experience.

Aside from the few functional motifs that crop up here and there, not much else is worth mentioning. The listener will encounter several sudden bursts of orchestral noise, hinting at the horror/slasher elements of the film. The final track, "The Basement Graveyard," offers a poor climax to the album, ending with a whimper and leaving the listener wondering, "Is that it?" In the end, Geoff Zanelli's Disturbia is a disturbing listen-in more bad ways than good."

Clark Douglas of Movie Music UK gave the score two stars out of four, indicating a mixed review, he stated: "the opening title cue does a reasonable job of setting the tone for the score, offering an energetic piece of action/suspense. There is very little melody here, it's all about pulsating rhythms and aggressive motifs. However, it's really a cut above the usual action dreck provided by Remote Control composers, and offers a few glimpses of genuine intelligence. At times, the score vaguely resembles the action music of Marco Beltrami, without quite hitting those heights. Beltrami's recently released Live Free or Die Hard does a considerably better job at this sort of thing.

The tone changes in "Fishing", as some warm ideas are followed by some mournful ones. "Poofoot" is a brief rock instrumental. More of this can be heard in "I Like to Play." Some vaguely lustful and atmospheric romance appears in "Voyeurism," as our hero spies on the girl next door. The idea shows up again in "Walking Ashley Home." Lastly, we have suspense music. It meanders and wanders without really going anywhere in "Every Killer Lives Next Door to Someone" and "Stealth Ronnie," very dull cues. Such pieces worked well in the film, but on album, they threaten to tear the whole experience down.

"The Club Girl" and "Stalking a Killer" manage to bring back a little excitement, but only a little. The album closes on the mostly quite boring "The Basement Graveyard," which ends the album on an inconclusive and remarkably uneventful note. When the score is good, it really is pretty good, and when I watched the film, I noted how effectively it built up the atmosphere. However, on album, it's very hit and miss, with an emphasis on the latter. Strictly for those who think a few solid cues is enough to merit a purchase."

== Track listing ==
All music is composed by Geoff Zanelli.

No.	Title	Length
1.	"Disturbia"	7:02
2.	"Fishing"	3:52
3.	"Poofoot"	1:15
4.	"Voyeurism"	2:35
5.	"Every Killer Lives Next Door to Someone"	3:35
6.	"I Like to Play"	1:46
7.	"Stealth Ranie"	5:10
8.	"Walking Ashley Home"	2:01
9.	"The Club Girl"	2:47
10.	"Stalking a Killer"	7:15
11.	"The Basement Graveyard"	8:50
Total length:		46:08
