= Electronicat =

French musician

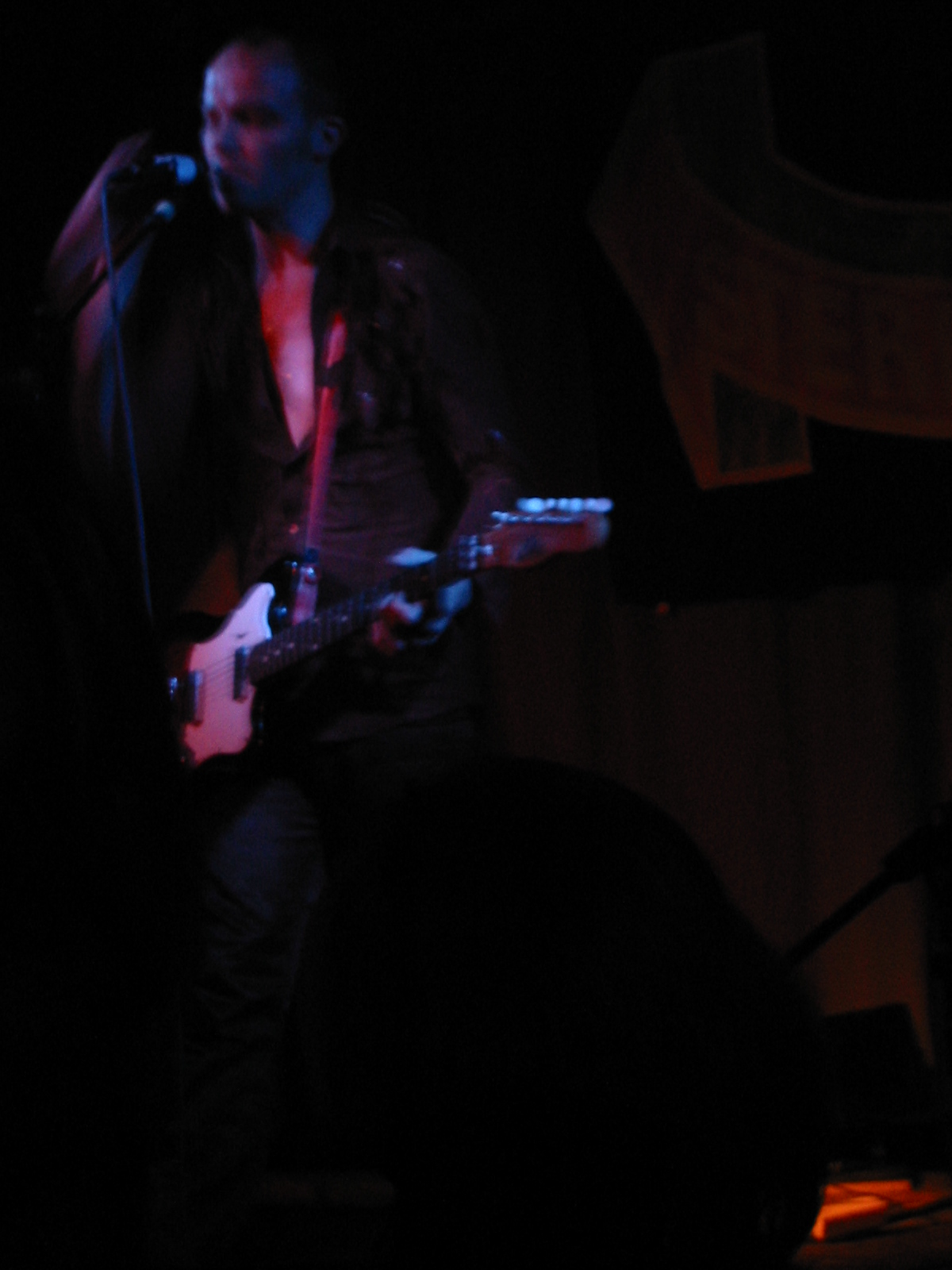

Background information
- Born: Fred Bigot
- Origin: Paris, France
- Genres: Rock; noise; psychedelic pop; electro
- Years active: 1997–present
- Labels: Disko B; Angelika Koehlermann; Oni.Tor; Noise Museum

Electronicat is the alter ego of French musician and performer Fred Bigot (French: [fʁɛd biɡo]), whose work is characterized by its constant switch between experimental noise and pop music.

His early collaborations include work with Kasper T. Toeplitz on the project "Sleaze Art", work with various choreographers (e.g. Sylvain Prunenec), theatre directors (Celia Houdart) and artists (e.g. Cecile Babiole).

From 1997 until 2000 he collaborated with visual artist Cecile Babiole on an audio/visual show "Hot Spectrum", playing at festivals such as Phonotaktik in Vienna or FCMM in Montréal, after which he decided to perform solo. Combining samples of his own voice with guitars, analogue synthesizers and drum machine loops he created a pounding, fuzzy, wah-wah distorted psychedelic electro sound.

In this context he decided to work together with other internationally renowned electronic music producers, such as Gerhard Potuznik and Patrick Pulsinger and employ the vocal skills of other musicians such as Khan (Captain Comatose), Catriona Shaw (Queen of Japan) and J. G. Thirlwell. Alongside this, he maintained activity in the experimental music circuit. He has released on a plethora of labels from Disko B to current London newcomer 'UpperCuts', has remixed numerous underground (e.g. Schlammpeitziger) and mainstream (e.g. Depeche Mode) musicians. In turn he has also been remixed by artists such as Zbigniew Karkowski, Kid 606 and other musicians on the electronic music circuit.

== Discography ==
=== Albums ===
- Wild Animal, Mono-Tone Records, 2021
- Chez Toi, Disko B, 2007
- Voodoo Man, Disko B, 2005
- 21st Century Toy, Disko B, 2003
- Birds Want to Have Fun, Angelika Koehlermann, 2002
- Cat a tac, Oni.Tor, 2001
- So I Love You, Noise Museum, 2000
- Electronicat, Noise Museum, 1999

=== Singles ===
- "Dans les Bois", Disko B, 2004
- "Frisco Bay", Disko B, 2003
- "Amour Sale", Disko B, 2002
- "Shuffle Tiiiime", Alice in Wonder, 2000

=== Remixes ===
- Life Less Machine, (Cato Canari), Jet Set Records, 2007
- My Baby Don't Care, (One-Two), Uppercuts, 2006
- Jealousy, (Miss le Bomb), Careless Records, 2006
- Loved But Not Fired, (Brezel Göring), Surprise, 2005
- Keiren, (Shinto), Echokammer, 2004
- America, (Boy from Brazil), Transsolar, 2004
- Fast food messiah, (Junesex), Pop up, 2004
- Prä-Frag Behäbige..., (Schlammpeitziger), Sonig, 2004
- Baby, (Captain Comatose), Playhouse, 2004
- We Got The Horror, (The Emergency), Feral Media, 2004
- Alles ist da, (Mense Reents), Ladomat, 2003
- Driving song, (Numbers), Tigerbeat6, 2002
- Plugin city universe, (Valvola), S.H.A.D.O., 2002
- Soft Wah War, (H.P vs A.Laplantine), Doxa, 2002
- Spitcat, (Beefcake), M-tronic, 2002
- The Dead of Night, (Depeche Mode), Mute, 2002

=== Compilation appearances ===
- Chez Toi, Echokammer Werkschau, Echokammer, 2008
- Lost Gigabyte, Pudel Produkte Vier, Nobistor, 2006
- Wop Doowop, The Trip Curated By Jarvis Cocker, Family Records, 2006
- Where were you...?, Freestyle Candies Vol.2, Klang Elektronik, 2006
- Keiren, Disko Cabine, Lou Records, 2005
- Flesh & Accessories, Electric Pop 4, MOFA 2005
- Bolantronic, The Other Side, New York Breakbeat, 2005
- Till I Die, Colette No. 5, Colette, 2003
- Frisco Bay, Electro Rock, Wagram, 2003
- Frisco Bay, Nag Nag Nag, React, 2003
- Amour Sale, French Sounds Catalogue, 2002
- Shuffle Tiiiime, Martin Gore DJ Set, Mute, 2001
- Ecatloop, Lockers ERS 2000
- Shuffle Time, Schaffelfieber, Kompakt, 2000

== External links and references ==
- Official site
- Electronicat on All Music
- Electronicat on Forced Exposure
- Site as Fred Bigot
- Myspace page
- Disko B label page
- Electronicat interview
- Electronicat reviewed on Staalplaat
- Electronicat on Discogs
- Electronicat on Laut.de (German site)
- Short German interview on curt.de
- Electronicat Review in FutureMusic p.87, Issue 135
