= Noiseshaper =

- Origin: Berlin, Germany
- Genres: Dub, reggae, electronic
- Years active: 2000–present
- Labels: Different Drummer, Echo Beach, Cat'n Roof
- Members: Florian Fleischmann, Axel Hirn
- Website: www.noiseshaper.net

Noiseshaper is a dub reggae duo based in Berlin, Germany, consisting of Florian Fleischmann and Axel Hirn. The duo is known for their frequent mixes and remixes of their own songs, as well as those of other artists. Their music includes elements of dub music, conventional reggae, electronic music, and numerous other genres. The duo was formed in Austria in 2000, and relocated to Berlin soon after releasing their debut album, Prelaunch Sequence, in 2001.

== Critical reception ==
In a favorable review of the Signal in the Dominion Post, Lindsay Davis wrote that "Like many new artists dabbling in the irie roots of Babylon, Noiseshaper use reggae as their base and seamlessly blend elements of dub, raga, dancehall, house and electronica into a rich stew."

== Discography ==
- Prelaunch Sequence (Different Drummer, 2001)
- The Signal (Different Drummer, 2003)
- Rough out There (Echo Beach, 2005)
- Real to Reel (Echo Beach/Miracle Sounds, 2006)
- Satellite City (Cat'n Roof, 2009)
