= Dabrye =

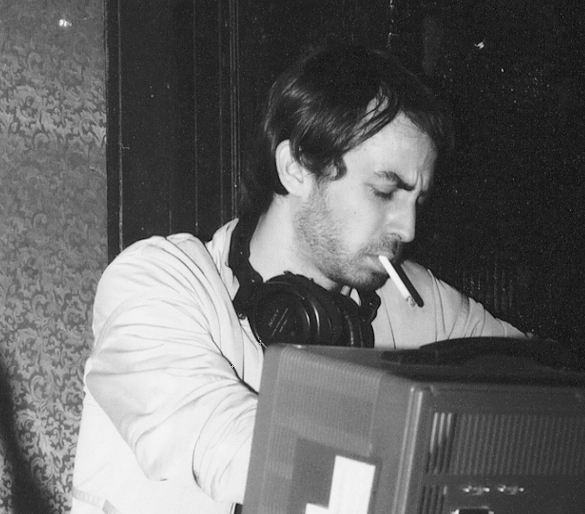

Background information
- Also known as: James T. Cotton; Tadd Mullinix; SK-1; X-Altera
- Origin: Michigan, United States
- Genres: IDM; hip-hop
- Years active: 2001–present
- Labels: Ghostly International; Spectral Sound; Rephlex

Tadd Mullinix or Dabrye is an American musician from Ann Arbor, Michigan, United States, also known by the aliases James T. Cotton, SK-1 and X-Altera. During his adolescent years, he grew up in Troy, MI. His Winking Makes a Face was the first album released by Ann Arbor's Ghostly International. Parting with the IDM sound of Winking..., the first Dabrye album was 2001's One/Three, whose take on instrumental hip-hop paralleled the work of artists such as Prefuse 73.

Successive Dabrye projects included 2004's "Game Over" single, which featured MC work by Jay Dee and Phat Kat – the single was a precursor to the second Dabrye full-length Two/Three, which includes other notable underground figures like MF Doom, Beans, Vast Aire, and Big Tone, and features art by France's WK Interact. Mullinix's work as Dabrye has been met with acclaim for its signature rhythmic sensibilities, which fuse the feel of live drumming with stylized electronic programming. Dabrye recently teamed up with then-roommate D'Marc Cantu to form the techno/acid house group 2 AM/FM. The track "Hyped-Up Plus Tax" from the One/Three album was used as a jingle for the Motorola RAZR V3 commercial.

== Discography ==
=== As Dabrye ===
==== Albums ====
- One/Three (2001)
- Instrmntl (2002)
- Additional Productions Vol.1 (2005)
- Two/Three (2006)
- Two/Three Instrumentals (2006)
- Three/Three (2018)
- Three/Three Instrumentals (2019)
- Super-Cassette (2024)

==== Singles and EPs ====
- "Game Over" single (2004)
- Payback EP (2003)
- Game Over EP (2004)
- "Air" single (2006)
- Get Dirty EP (2008)

=== As James T. Cotton ===
==== Albums ====
- The Dancing Box (2004)
- Like No One (2008)

==== EPs ====
- Mind Your Manners (2001)
- Buck! Ep (2003)
- Press Your Body EP (2004)
- Oochie Coo (2006)
- On Time EP (2010)
- Valley Road (We Are 1) (as JTC) (2013)

=== As Tadd Mullinix ===
==== Albums ====
- Winking Makes a Face (2000)
- Panes (2002)

=== As X-Altera ===
==== Albums ====
- X-Altera (2018)

=== With 2 AM/FM ===
==== EPs ====
- Pt. 1 (2005)
- Pt. 2 (2006)
- Electronic Justice (2008)
