= Funkstörung =

German electronic music duo

- Also known as: Musik Aus Strom
- Origin: Rosenheim, Germany
- Genres: IDM; electronica
- Years active: 1995–2006; 2015–present
- Labels: Acid Planet; Bunker; Compost; Musik Aus Strom; Chocolate Industries; FatCat; !K7; Monkeytown
- Members: Michael Fakesch; Chris de Luca
- Website: www.funkstorung.com

Funkstörung (sometimes stylized as Funkstorung) are an electronic music duo from Rosenheim, Germany, consisting of Michael Fakesch and Chris de Luca.

== History ==
Chris de Luca and Michael Fakesch first met in 1992 at a techno party organised by Fakesch in Rosenheim. Subsequently, the two started producing tracks together.

In 1999, the duo released Additional Productions, a compilation album of their remixes of other artists' songs such as Björk's "All Is Full of Love", Wu-Tang Clan's "Reunited", East Flatbush Project's "Tried by 12", and Finitribe's "Mind My Make-Up". Their debut studio album, Appetite for Disctruction, followed in 2000.

In 2004, the duo released a studio album, Disconnected. The music video for "Chopping Heads", directed by Keep Adding and Scott Pagano, was selected for the International Critic's Week at the 2005 Cannes Film Festival.

In 2005, the duo released The Return to the Acid Planet, which consisted of remixes of old tracks they discovered while cleaning their studio.

In 2006, a statement was published on funkstorung.com, stating that the duo had officially broken up due to musical, personal and practical differences. Both Michael Fakesch and Christian de Luca will continue making music with their respective solo projects.

In 2015, Funkstörung released a studio album, Funkstörung, on Monkeytown Records.

== Discography ==
=== Studio albums ===
- Appetite for Disctruction (2000)
- Disconnected (2004)
- The Return to the Acid Planet (2005)
- Funkstörung (2015)

=== Compilation albums ===
- Additional Productions (1999)
- Vice Versa (2001)
- Appendix (2007)

=== EPs ===
- Bunker 024 (1995) (as Musik Aus Strom)
- Acid Planet 11 (1995) (as Musik Aus Strom)
- Acid Planet 12 (1995) (as Musik Aus Strom)
- Acid Planet 13 (1995)
- Acid Planet 14 (1995)
- Musik Aus Strom 1.08 (1996)
- Breakart (1996)
- Elektromotor (1996)
- Artificial Garbage (1997)
- Funkentstört (1997)
- Sonderdienste (1997)
- Post.Art (1997)
- Multiple Grammy Winners (2000)
- Killers (2015)
- Laid Out Remixes (2015)

=== Singles ===
- "All Is Full of Love" (1998) (with Björk, as Björk Mit Funkstörung)
- "Fat Camp Feva" / "Disconnected" (2004)
- "Moon Addicted" / "Chopping Heads" (2004)

=== DVDs ===
- Isolated. Triple Media. (2004)
