= Deadly Hearts =

Australian compilation album series

Deadly Hearts is a music compilation and live musical performance, celebrating Australian Indigenous Music.

== Background ==
In 2017, 12 largely unknown indigenous Australian artists, were given a choice of classic track to make their own, which would be compiled into a compilation album, known as Deadly Hearts. The call went out to the artists' as "Which song has spoken most strongly to you about growing up an Indigenous Australian?" The album was seen as "A celebration of music, culture, and identity, from the hearts and mouths of a new generation of Indigenous Australia" and was released on 30 June 2017.

In July 2019, ahead of NAIDOC Week, a second edition was released.

In 2019, a concert titled Deadly Hearts: a Celebration of Australian Indigenous Music occurred, taking inspiration from Deadly Hearts albums. The concert featured some of Australia's best past, present and emerging indigenous artists, including Jessica Mauboy, Archie Roach, Aodhan, Selve and Kinship Collective.

In 2020, ahead of NAIDOC Week and AusMusic Month throughout November, a third instalment of the album was released, titled Deadly Hearts: Walking Together. Unlike the first two releases which have focused on songs that are iconic to traditional Australian culture and identity, the call were for artists to take on a song that is iconic to them, a song that has inspired them and/or a song that holds a special place in their identity.

== Volume One (2017) ==
Deadly Hearts

Compilation album by Various artists
- Released: 30 June 2017
- Length: 49:33
- Label: ABC Music

Singles from Deadly Hearts

=== Track listing ===
1. "My Island Home" by Jimblah (3:51)
2. "Sunset Dreaming (Djapana Remix)" by Birdz (3:33)
3. "Solid Rock" by Robbie Miller (3:47)
4. "Maralitja" by Dhapanbal Yunupingu (3:34)
5. "The Dead Heart" by Apakatjah (4:20)
6. "Where Did You Sleep Last Night?" by Benny Walker (3:41)
7. "Yil Lull" by Philly (3:40)
8. "Own Backyard" by Kuren (5:28)
9. "Black Boy" by Emily Wurramara (4:35)
10. "Blackfella/Whitefella" by Yirrmal (4:30)
11. "Yirrmal" by Daen featuring Kev Carmody (3:19)
12. "When the War Is Over" by Gawurraa (5:10)

=== Reception ===
Dan Condon from ABC said "Deadly Hearts is a great collection of well-loved songs given a refreshing overhaul by some of our country's most engaging new voices."

== Volume Two (2019) ==
Deadly Hearts 2

Compilation album by Various artists
- Released: 5 July 2019
- Length: 36:21
- Label: ABC Music

Singles from Deadly Hearts
- 1. "Vision" Released: 21 June 2019

=== Track listing ===
1. "Vision" by Electric Fields (3:50)
2. "Speak Your Language" by Alice Skye (5:11)
3. "Lonesome but Free" by Busby Marou (3:08)
4. "Fitzroy Crossing" by Dan Sultan (3:32)
5. "Around Here" by Tia Gostelow (3:22)
6. "Get By" by Dallas Woods (3:28)
7. "Blackfellas" by Nooky (2:21)
8. "Love Me Less" by HVWKS featuring Jamie Rose (3:18)
9. "We Have Survived" by Dobby (3:57)
10. "Walking into Doors" by Radical Son (4:10)

=== Reception ===
Karen Leng from ABC said "Across styles as broad as country, hip hop and pop, Deadly Hearts 2 is a great listen. By celebrating Australian trailblazers through much loved songs, new young Indigenous artists can confidently tell their own story on solid ground."

== Volume Three: Walking Together (2020) ==
Deadly Hearts: Walking Together

Compilation album by Various artists
- Released: 6 November 2020
- Label: ABC Music

Singles from Deadly Hearts
- 1. "Tjitji" Released: 23 October 2020; 2. "Neon Moon" Released: 23 October 2020; 3. "Absolutely Everybody" Released: 30 October 2020; 4. "Get Back to the Land" Released: 30 October 2020

=== Track listing ===
1. "Tjitji" by Ziggy Ramo featuring Miiesha (3:12)
2. "A Long Way Away from My Country" by Kobie Dee (2:44)
3. "Neon Moon" by Miiesha featuring The Woorabinda Singers (3:20)
4. "Get Back to the Land" DRMNGNOW featuring Emily Wurramara (4:16)
5. "Absolutely Everybody" by Mitch Tambo (3:53)
6. "Solid Gold" by Sycco (3:21)
7. "Always" by Aodhan (3:50)
8. "How Deep Is Your Love" by Mi-Kaisha (3:17)
9. "Don't Dream It's Over" by Isaiah Firebrace & Stan Walker (3:37)
10. "Beds Are Burning" by Southeast Desert Metal (4:34)
