= Yirrmal =

Indigenous Australian singer

- Born: Yirrmal Marika; 1993 (age 32–33); Yirrkala, Northern Territory, Australia
- Origin: Northern Territory, Australia
- Instrument: Vocals
- Years active: 2013–present

Yirrmal Marika (born 1993), known mononymously as Yirrmal, is an Indigenous Australian vocalist. A Yolngu man, his music features traditional sounds and elements of Yolŋu music.

== Early life ==
Yirrmal Marika was born in 1993 in Yirrkala in the Rirratjingu clan and began learning music at age 11.

== Personal life ==
Yirrmal's father, Witiyana Marika, was a singer and dancer in Yothu Yindi and is related to Dr Gurrumul Yunupingu on his mother's side. Yirrmal cites his grandfather and former lead singer of Yothu Yindi, Dr Yunupingu as his biggest influence saying "He was my inspiration since I was a kid. He did great things for all Australians. There are a lot of other Indigenous people that I look up to also – people such as Archie Roach, Gurrumul, Saltwater Band, Dan Sultan, Jessica Mauboy and Rrawun Maymuru. I see what they have done for their people."

Yirrmal moved to Geelong, Victoria in 2011.

== Career ==
In 2013, Yirrmal released his debut single "Deep Blue Sea". He performed the song at numerous events including Australasian Worldwide Music Expo as a solo artist and as Yirrmal & The Yolngu Boys.

In November 2016, Yirrmal released his debut EP Youngblood, telling the ABC Radio "We're living in two worlds, learning in two worlds, carrying a message, a sharing of culture". Melissa Davis from Forte Magazine gave the EP 5 out of 5 saying "His rich voice combined with his lyrics tells the stories of dreams, the issues in society and his culture – a unique insight." ABC Radio called it "deeply affecting and joyously celebrating his upbringing and place in the world."

In 2017, Yirrmal featured on Baker Boy's "Marryuna". The song ranked at number 17 in Triple J's Hottest 100 of 2017. At the Music Victoria Awards of 2018 "Marryuna" won Best Song. and at the National Indigenous Music Awards 2018, the video won Film Clip of the Year.

In August 2022, Yirrmal released "Promised Land", featuring Dami Im. The song was produced by Andrew Farriss, and is expected to be taken off Yirrmal's self-titled debut album, scheduled to be released later in the year.

In March 2023, Yirrmal released "Love Sweet Love" co-written with Shane Howard of Goanna.

== Discography ==
=== Extended plays ===
List of EP, with release date and label shown
Title	Details
Youngblood	Released: November 2016; Label: Marrma' Rom Two Words; Formats: digital download, streaming

=== Singles ===
==== As lead artist ====
List of singles, with year released
Title	Year	Album
"Deep Blue Sea"	2013	non album single
"For Everyone" (with Jordie Lane)	2019	TBA
"Dhaliwuy Bay"	2022	TBA
"Promised Land" (featuring Dami Im)	2022	TBA
"Shining Light"	2022	TBA
"Love Sweet Love"	2023	TBA
"Keep Rolling On"	2023	TBA

==== As featured artist ====
List of singles as featured artist, with year released and album shown
Title	Year	Album
"Marryuna" (Baker Boy featuring Yirrmal)	2017	Non-album single
"Keep On Rolling" (Neil Murray featuring Emma Donovan & Yirrmal)	2021	
"Ride" (Baker Boy featuring Yirrmal)	2021	Gela

=== Guest appearances ===
List of guest appearances, with year released and album name shown
Title	Year	Album
"Blackfella/Whitefella"	2017	Deadly Hearts (Volume One)
"Treaty" (Midnight Oil featuring Yirrmal)	2018	Armistice Day

== Awards and nominations ==
=== AIR Awards ===
The Australian Independent Record Awards (known informally as the AIR Awards) is an annual awards night to recognise, promote and celebrate the success of Australia's Independent Music sector.

Year	Nominee / work	Award	Result	Ref.
2018	"Marryuna" (with Baker Boy)	Best Independent Single or EP	Nominated	

=== APRA Awards ===
The APRA Awards are held in Australia and New Zealand by the Australasian Performing Right Association to recognise songwriting skills, sales and airplay performance by its members annually.

Year	Nominee / work	Award	Result	Ref.
2019	"Marryuna" (with Baker Boy)	Urban Work of the Year	Nominated	

=== National Indigenous Music Awards ===
The National Indigenous Music Awards (NIMAs) recognise excellence, dedication, innovation and outstanding contribution to the Northern Territory music industry.

Year	Nominee / work	Award	Result	Ref.
2017	Yirrmal	New Talent of the Year	Nominated	
2017	"The Bridge"	Song of the Year	Nominated	
2019	"For Everyone"	Film Clip of the Year	Nominated	
2019	"For Everyone"	Song of the Year	Nominated	
2021	"Ride" (Baker Boy featuring Yirrmal)	Film Clip of the Year	Won	
2023	"Promised Land" (featuring Dami Im)	Song of the Year	Nominated	
2023	"Indigenous" (Indigenous Outreach Project w/ Gunyangara, Yirrkala & Dhalinbuy featuring Yirrmal)	Community Clip of the Year	Nominated	
