= National Indigenous Music Awards 2018 =

Annual Australian music awards ceremony

- Date: 11 August 2018
- Venue: The Amphitheatre Botanical Gardens, Northern Territory, Australia

Highlights
- Most wins: Gurrumul (3)
- Most nominations: Gurrumul, Baker Boy (3)
- Website: nima.musicnt.com.au

Television/radio coverage
- Network: National Indigenous Television

The National Indigenous Music Awards 2018 were the 15th annual National Indigenous Music Awards.

The nominations were announced on 9 July 2018 and the awards ceremony was held on 11 August 2018.

2018 was seen as a strong year for Indigenous music with an ARIA number 1 album, national tours, Eurovision Song Contest performance appearances, Triple J Hottest 100, 2018 placements and acts playing festivals across the country. The 2018 National Indigenous Music Awards saw a growth in both audience and nominations.

NIMA Reference Group Chair Warren H. Williams said "The growth in the National Indigenous Music Awards has mirrored the growth of Indigenous music more generally over the last fifteen years. As our musicians have continued their journey of taking their rightful place at the forefront of Australian music, the awards have been there not just to celebrate their successes, but to be a launching pad for new talent and discovery vehicle for musicians, whether they are from Darwin, Devonport, Derby, Dubbo or the Daintree."

== Performers ==
- Baker Boy
- Busby Marou
- Kasey Chambers with Alan Pigram
- Roger Knox
- Alice Skye
- Kardajala Kirridarra
- Yirrmal
- Kenbi Dancers
- Central Australian Aboriginal Women's Choir
- Stiff Gins

== Hall of Fame inductee ==
- Roger Knox

Roger Knox has career spanning over three decades, from his debut album Give It a Go in 1984 to Stranger in My Land in 2013. Australian Music Vault Senior Curator, Carolyn Laffan, said "For more than thirty years Roger's music has brought joy and healing to audiences in remote areas of Australia, in prisons and correctional centres and at festivals across Australia and North America."

== Triple J Unearthed National Indigenous Winner ==
- Alice Skye

Alice Skye is a 22 year old Wergaia and Wamba Wamba woman based in Melbourne. She grew up in the Grampians in country Victoria. Her songwriting often reflects the calming mountain landscape that she calls home. Skye uploaded "Poetry By Text" in November 2017 followed by "Friends with Feelings" in April 2018 onto Triple J Unearthed.

== Special Recognition award ==
- Central Australian Aboriginal Women's Choir

== Awards ==
Artist of the Year

Artist	Result
A.B. Original	Nominated
Archie Roach	Nominated
Electric Fields	Nominated
Gurrumul	Won
Jessica Mauboy	Nominated

New Talent of the Year

Artist	Result
Alice Skye	Nominated
Baker Boy	Won
Emily Wurramara	Nominated
Isaiah Firebrace	Nominated
Ziggy Ramo	Nominated

Album of the Year

Artist and album	Result
Dan Sultan - Killer	Nominated
Emily Wurramara - Milyakburra	Nominated
Gurrumul - Djarimirri (Child of the Rainbow)	Won
Kardajala Kirridarra - Kardajala Kirridarra	Nominated
Kuren - Melting Conceptually	Nominated

Film Clip of the Year

Artist and song	Result
Alice Skye - "Friends With Feelings"	Nominated
Baker Boy - "Marryuna"	Won
Birdz - "This Side"	Nominated
Black Rock Band - "Bininj Kuborrk"	Nominated
Jessica Mauboy - "We Got Love"	Nominated

Song of the Year

Artist and song	Result
Baker Boy - "Marryuna"	Nominated
Busby Marou - "Days of Gold"	Nominated
Dan Sultan - "Kingdom"	Nominated
Gurrumul - "Djarimirri (Child of the Rainbow)"	Won
Kardajala Kirridarra - "Ngurra"	Nominated

Community Clip of the Year

Artist and song	Result
Ali Curung NT - "Bounce With Me"	Nominated
B-Town Warriors - "Thundercloud: Bourke"	Won
Condobolin, NSW: The Condo Crew - "How Ya Feelin'"	Nominated
Githabul Next Generation - "Looking Out For Country"	Nominated
Mulli Mulli and Yiyili Mawoolie - "Yiyili Kids"	Nominated
