= Nara (album) =

2024 album by Emily Wurramara

Studio album by Emily Wurramara
- Released: 23 August 2024
- Recorded: Boat Ramp Studios, Darwin
- Label: Emily Wurramara, ABC Music
- Producer: Emily Wurramara and Kuya James

Emily Wurramara chronology
| Ayarra Emeba (Calm Songs) (2022) | Nara (2024) |

Nara is the second studio album by Indigenous Australian musician, Emily Wurramara. The album was released 23 August 2024 and supported by an Australian tour. "Nara" means "nothing" in the Anindilyakwa language.

At the 2024 ARIA Music Awards, it won ARIA Award for Best Adult Contemporary Album.

At the AIR Awards of 2025, the album was nominated for Independent Album of the Year while ABC Music and The Annex for Independent Marketing Team of the Year and Liz Ansley for Independent Publicity Team of the Year.

At the National Indigenous Music Awards 2025 the album was nominated for Album of the Year.

== Reception ==
Mitch Mosk from Atwood Magazine said "Emily Wurramara's humanity shines throughout her breathtaking, liberating sophomore album Nara, an ambitious and unapologetically bold, soul-baring record that refuses to be not just one thing, but everything as the artist speaks her truth, spreads her wings, and soars."

Triple R said "The album explores personal growth, mental health and cultural identity. Musically, Nara blends indie rock, pop, R&B, neo-soul, folk, roots/blues rock and electronic music, showing Wurramara's versatility as an artist and producer. Restrained ballads sit alongside more dance-infused club music, all unified by Wurramara's compelling vocal delivery and storytelling style."

== Track listing ==
| No. | Title | Length |
|---|---|---|
| 1. | "Midnight Blues" | 4:18 |
| 2. | "W.W.G.B.H." (featuring Zeppelin Hamilton) | 5:49 |
| 3. | "It's You" | 3:12 |
| 4. | "D.T.M.N." | 3:48 |
| 5. | "Friend" | 3:08 |
| 6. | "S.T.F.A.F.M." (featuring Arringarri) | 4:01 |
| 7. | "Verandah" | 5:50 |
| 8. | "Lordy Lordy" (with Tasman Keith) | 3:50 |
| 9. | "Boom Biddy Bye" | 3:06 |
| 10. | "See Me There" (with Lisa Mitchell) | 4:40 |
| 11. | "Magic Woman Dancing" | 4:31 |
| 12. | "Passport" | 4:24 |

== Charts ==
Chart performance for Nara
| Chart (2024) | Peak position |
|---|---|
| Australian Artist Albums (ARIA) | 17 |
