= Claudia Sangiorgi Dalimore =

Australian filmmaker

Claudia Sangiorgi Dalimore is an Australian filmmaker. She won an Australian Women in Music Award. She features women in her music videos. Her videos have been nominated for the ARIA Award for Best Video and J Award Music Video of the Year honor.

She directed Thelma Plum's "Better In Blak" music video. She and Plum were interviewed by Marie Claire.

In 2020, she directed a music video for Okenyo addressing white supremacy. Her music video for Nigerian-Australian musician PRICIE debuted in February 2021.

In 2024 she directed the music video for "Losing You" for Australia singer-songwriter duo Angus & Julia Stone.

== Awards and nominations ==
=== AIR Awards ===
The Australian Independent Record Awards (commonly known informally as AIR Awards) is an annual awards night to recognise, promote and celebrate the success of Australia's Independent Music sector.

Year	Nominee / work	Award	Result	Ref.
2025	"Lordy Lordy" (Emily Wurramara featuring Tasman Keith); Directed by Claudia Sangiorgi Dalimore	Independent Music Video of the Year	Nominated	
2026	"Backstreets" (Miss Kaninna); Directed by Claudia Sangiorgi Dalimore	Independent Music Video of the Year	Nominated	

=== ARIA Music Awards ===
The ARIA Music Awards is an annual award ceremony event celebrating the Australian music industry. They commenced in 1987.

Year	Nominee / work	Award	Result	Ref.
2018	"Native Tongue" by Mojo Juju (directed by Claudia Sangiorgi Dalimore)	Best Video	Nominated	
2019	"Better in Blak" by Thelma Plum (directed by Claudia Sangiorgi Dalimore)	Best Video	Nominated	
2025	"Craters" by Missy Higgins (directed by Claudia Sangiorgi Dalimore)	Best Video	Nominated	
2025	"Lordy Lordy" by Emily Wurramara (directed by Claudia Sangiorgi Dalimore)	Best Video	Nominated	
2026	"Backstreets" by Miss Kaninna (directed by Claudia Sangiorgi Dalimore)	Best Video	Nominated	

=== J Awards ===
The J Awards are an annual series of Australian music awards that were established by the Australian Broadcasting Corporation's youth-focused radio station Triple J. They commenced in 2005.

Year	Nominee / work	Award	Result	Ref.
2024	"Lordy Lordy" (Emily Wurramara featuring Tasman Keith); Directed by Claudia Sangiorgi Dalimore	Australian Video of the Year	Won	
2026	"Backstreets" (Miss Kaninna); Directed by Claudia Sangiorgi Dalimore	Australian Video of the Year	Nominated	
