= 2024 ARIA Music Awards =

Edition of Australian music awards

- Date: 20 November 2024
- Venue: Hordern Pavilion, Sydney, New South Wales
- Hosted by: Tim Blackwell

Highlights
- Most wins: Royel Otis (4)
- Most nominations: Royel Otis (8)
- Website: ariaawards.com.au

Television/radio coverage
- Networks
- Nine Network, YouTube, Stan

The 2024 ARIA Music Awards were the 38th Annual Australian Recording Industry Association Music Awards (generally known as the ARIA Music Awards or simply the ARIAs) and consist of a series of awards, including the 2024 ARIA Awards, ARIA Artisan Awards, ARIA Fine Arts Awards and ARIA Hall of Fame. The ARIA Awards ceremony was held on 20 November 2024, broadcast on Nine Network and live-streamed via YouTube and Stan from Hordern Pavilion, Sydney.

== Performers ==
- Amy Shark - "Two Friends" and "Beautiful Eyes"
- Cyril (with Budjerah and Becca Hatch) - "Stumblin' In"
- Ava Max - "Spot a Fake", "Kings & Queens", "Sweet but Psycho" and "Forever Young"
- The Kid Laroi - "Girls" and "The First Time"
- 3%, Jessica Mauboy and Julian Hamilton from The Presets - "Won't Stop" and "Our People"
- Troy Cassar-Daley and Kasey Chambers - "Let's Ride"
- Kane Brown - "Miles on It"
- Teen Jesus and The Jean Teasers - "I Used to Be Fun"
- Angie McMahon - "Letting Go"
- Pixies - "Where Is My Mind?"
- Missy Higgins (with Amy Shark, G Flip, Gretta Ray and Angie McMahon) - "The Second Act", "The Special Two", "Scar"

== ARIA Hall of Fame inductee ==
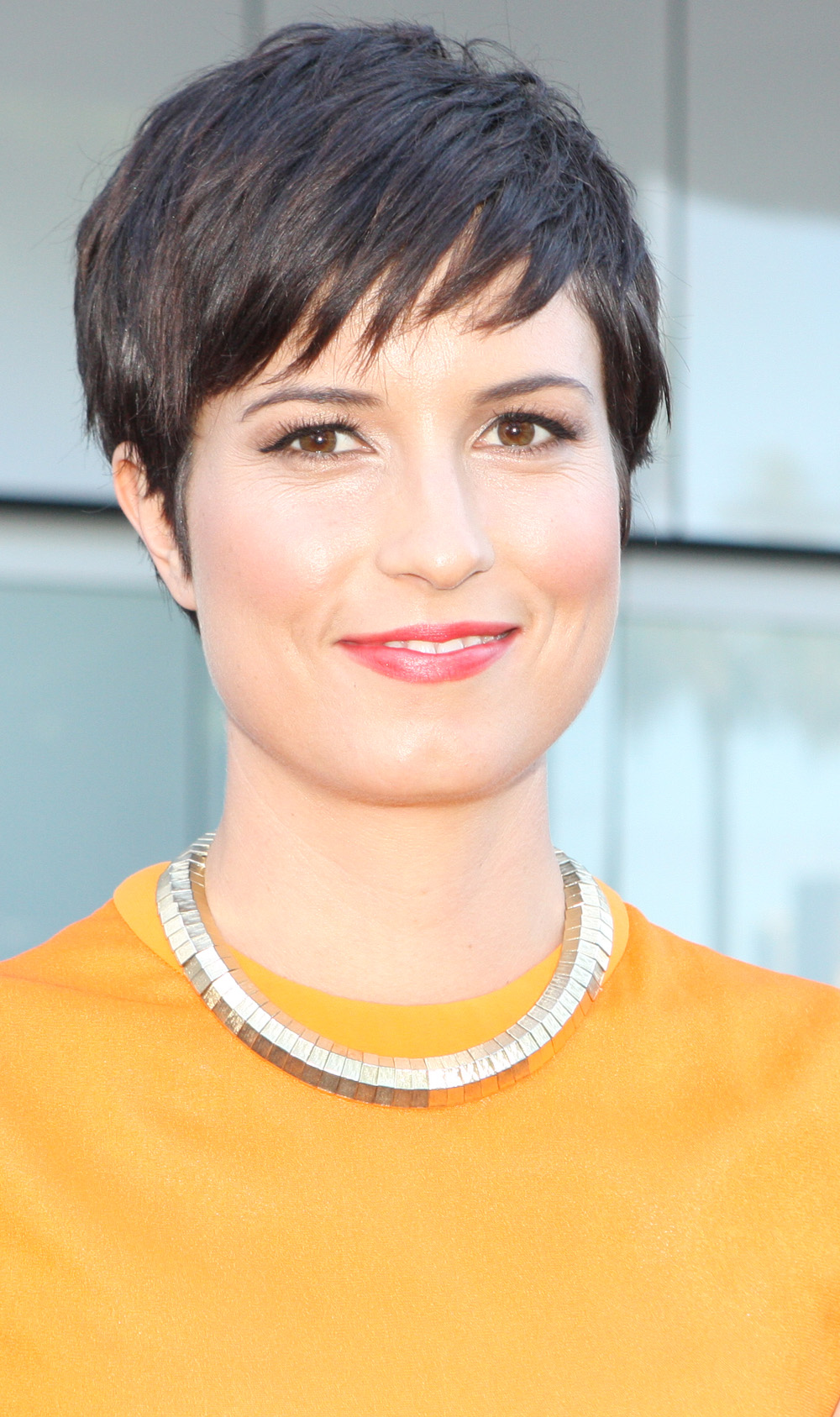
Missy Higgins at the 2013 ARIA Awards, Sydney

Singer-songwriter Missy Higgins was inducted into the ARIA Hall of Fame.

== Nominees and winners ==
Nominations were announced on 26 September 2024 via ARIA's YouTube channel, hosted by Renee Bargh.

=== ARIA Awards ===
Full list of nominees
Album of the Year	Best Solo Artist
Troye Sivan – Something to Give Each Other; Amy Shark – Sunday Sadness; Angie McMahon – Light, Dark, Light Again; Kylie Minogue – Tension; Royel Otis – Pratts & Pain	Troye Sivan – Something to Give Each Other; Amy Shark – Sunday Sadness; Angie McMahon – Light, Dark, Light Again; Dom Dolla – "Saving Up"; Emma Donovan – Till My Song Is Done; Kylie Minogue – Tension; The Kid Laroi – The First Time [Deluxe Version]; Tkay Maidza – Sweet Justice; Tones And I – Beautifully Ordinary; Troy Cassar-Daley – Between the Fires
Best Group	Michael Gudinski Breakthrough Artist
Royel Otis – Pratts & Pain; 3% – Kill the Dead; Hiatus Kaiyote – Love Heart Cheat Code; Rüfüs Du Sol – "Music Is Better"; Speed – Only One Mode	Teen Jesus and the Jean Teasers – I Love You; 3% – Kill the Dead; Becca Hatch – Mayday; Kita Alexander – Young in Love; Sycco – Zorb
Best Adult Contemporary Album	Best Blues & Roots Album
Emily Wurramara – Nara; Angus & Julia Stone – Cape Forestier; Crowded House – Gravity Stairs; Emma Donovan – Til My Song Is Done; Fanning Dempsey National Park – The Deluge	Mia Dyson – Tender Heart; Checkerboard Lounge – Sun Sessions; Dope Lemon – Kimosabè; Georgia Mooney – Full of Moon; The Paper Kites – At the Roadhouse
Best Children's Album	Best Country Album
Bluey – Dance Mode!; Emma Memma – Twirly Tunes; Josh Pyke – It's Gonna Be a Great, Great Day!; The Wiggles – Wiggle and Learn: 100 Educational Songs for Children; Zindzi & the Zillionaires – Zindzi & the Zillionaires	Troy Cassar-Daley – Between the Fires; Casey Barnes – Mayday; Henry Wagons – The Four Seasons; James Johnston – Raised Like That; Tori Forsyth – All We Have Is Who We Are
Best Dance/Electronic Release	Best Hard Rock/Heavy Metal Album
Dom Dolla – "Saving Up"; Confidence Man – "I Can't Lose You"; Cyril – "Stumblin' In"; Fisher featuring Kita Alexander – "Atmosphere"; Rüfüs Du Sol – "Music is Better"	Speed – Only One Mode; C.O.F.F.I.N – Australia Stops; Dune Rats – If It Sucks, Turn It Up; Polaris – Fatalism; Teenage Jones – The Rot That Grows Inside My Chest
Best Hip Hop/Rap Release	Best Independent Release
3% – Kill the Dead; Kobie Dee – Chapter 26; Lithe – "Fall Back"; Onefour – "Natural Habitat"; The Kid Laroi – The First Time [Deluxe Version]	Angie McMahon – Light, Dark, Light Again; Emily Wurramara – Nara; Kylie Minogue – Tension; Miss Kaninna – "Blak Britney"; Royel Otis – Pratts & Pain
Best Pop Release	Best Rock Album
Troye Sivan – Something to Give Each Other; Amy Shark – Sunday Sadness; Jessica Mauboy – Yours Forever; Kylie Minogue – Tension; The Kid Laroi – "Girls"	Royel Otis – Pratts & Pain; Angie McMahon – Light, Dark, Light Again; Grinspoon – Whatever, Whatever; King Gizzard & the Lizard Wizard – Flight b741; Middle Kids – Faith Crisis Pt 1
Best Soul/R&B Release	Best Use of an Australian Recording in an Advertisement
Tkay Maidza – Sweet Justice; Forest Claudette – Jupiter; Milan Ring – Mangos; Miss Kaninna – "Blak Britney"; Pania – We Still Young	JK-47 – Cancer Council: End the Trend (Bolster Group); Eurogliders – realestate.com.au: Keep Moving (72andSunny); Kobie Dee – NRL & AFL: Warriors and Storytellers (Fox Sports Australia); Tones and I – Qantas Olympics: Already Proud (Howatson+Company); The Beefs – Speedo International: Go Full Speedo (Collider/Mirimar)

=== Public voted ===
Best Video	Song of the Year
Tones And I, Nick Kozakis and Sela Vai for Tones And I – "Dance with Me"; Macario de Souza for Amy Shark – "Beautiful Eyes"; Will Hamilton-Coates for Miss Kaninna – "Blak Britney"; Jack Shepherd for Lime Cordiale – "Cold Treatment"; Zac Dov Wiesel for Confidence Man – "I Can't Lose You"; Michael O'Halloran (ONYX Film) for Budjerah – "Is It Ever Gonna Make Sense"; Katzki for Rüfüs Du Sol – "Lately"; Jack Rudder, Jem Siow, Thomas Elliot for Speed – "Real Life Love"; Josh Harris for Peach PRC – "Time of My Life"; John Angus Stewart for Amyl and the Sniffers – "U Should Not Be Doing That"	G Flip – "The Worst Person Alive"; Cyril – "Stumblin' In"; Dom Dolla – "Saving Up"; Fisher featuring Kita Alexander – "Atmosphere"; Jessica Mauboy featuring Jason Derulo – "Give You Love"; Kylie Minogue – "Tension"; Lithe – "Fall Back"; Royel Otis – "Murder on the Dance Floor" – triple j Like A Version; The Kid Laroi – "Nights Like This"; Troye Sivan – "Got Me Started"
Best Australian Live Act	Best International Artist
Missy Higgins – The Second Act Tour 2024; Angie McMahon – Making It Through Tour; Barkaa – Barkaa; Confidence Man – Laneway Festival; Dirty Three – Love Changes Everything Tour; Dom Dolla – Australian Tour 2023; King Stingray – Regional Run 2024; Royel Otis – Pratts & Pain Tour; Rüfüs Du Sol – 2024 Australian Summer Tour Dates; Tones and I – P!nk supported by Tones and I	Taylor Swift – The Tortured Poets Department; Ariana Grande – Eternal Sunshine; Billie Eilish – Hit Me Hard and Soft; Chappell Roan – The Rise and Fall of a Midwest Princess; Charli XCX – Brat; Drake – For All the Dogs; Olivia Rodrigo – Guts; Tate McRae – Think Later; Travis Scott – Utopia; Zach Bryan – Zach Bryan
Music Teacher of the Year
Nathaniel Miller (Bulman School, Bulman Community, Arnhem Land, NT); Casey Allen (PLC Sydney, Croydon, Eora Nation, NSW); Hayley Wedding (Seaview High School, Seacombe Heights, Kaurna Land, SA); Susan Sukkar (Petersham Public School, Lewisham, Eora Nation, NSW)

=== Fine Arts Awards ===
Best Classical Album
- Sophie Hutchings – A World Outside
  - Australian Chamber Orchestra/Richard Tognetti – Beethoven Symphonies 1, 2 & 3 'Eroica'
  - Grigoryan Brothers – Amistad – Music for Two Guitars
  - Orava Quartet – ORAWA
  - Veronique Serret – Migrating Bird
Best Jazz Album
- Mildlife – Chorus
  - Audrey Powne – From the Fire
  - Elixir (featuring Katie Noonan, Zac Hurren & Ben Hauptmann) – A Small Shy Truth
  - Tourismo – Torque
  - Vanessa Perica Orchestra – The Eye is the First Circle
Best World Music Album
- Dobby – Warrangu: River Story
  - Christine Anu – Waku: Minaral a Minalay
  - Joseph Tawadros – The Virtue of Signals
  - Radical Son – Bilambiyal
  - Soweto Gospel Choir & Groove Terminator – History of House
Best Original Soundtrack or Musical Theatre Cast Album
- Various Artists – Faraway Downs
  - Ack Kinmonth – Scarygirl
  - Harlow – This is Harlow (Music From Paper Dolls)
  - Helena Czajka – Nemesis (Original Series Soundtrack)
  - Jackson Milas – The Way, My Way

=== Artisan Awards ===
Best Produced Release
- Chris Collins for Royel Otis – Pratts & Pain
  - Crowded House & Steven Schram for Crowded House – Gravity Stairs
  - Dom Dolla for Dom Dolla – "Saving Up"
  - Fisher for Fisher featuring Kita Alexander – "Atmosphere"
  - Luke Steele, Nick Littlemore and Peter Mayes for Empire of the Sun – Ask That God
Best Engineered Release
- Chris Collins for Royel Otis – Pratts & Pain
  - Dom Dolla for Dom Dolla – "Saving Up"
  - Eric J Debowsky for Angus & Julia Stone – Cape Forestier
  - Luke Steele, Nick Littlemore and Peter Mayes for Empire of the Sun – Ask That God
  - Tony Buchen for Mildlife – Chorus
Best Cover Art
- Daniel Boyd and Nomad Create for 3% – Kill the Dead
  - Giulia McGauran & Sam Chirnside for Tones and I – Beautifully Ordinary
  - Louis Leimbach for Lime Cordiale – Enough of the Sweet Talk
  - Michael Bryers for Troy Cassar-Daley – Between the Fires
  - Tomas Shanahan for Mildlife – Chorus
