= Good Morning (duo) =

Australian indie rock duo

- Origin: Melbourne, Victoria, Australia
- Genre: Indie rock
- Years active: 2014–2024
- Labels: Good Morning Music; Polyvinyl Record Co.
- Members: Liam Parsons; Stefan Blair

Good Morning is an Australian indie rock duo from Melbourne.

== History ==
The group began in 2014 with the release of their debut album, Shawcross. In January 2016, the duo released their second EP titled Glory.

Good Morning released their debut studio album in March 2018.

In 2019, Good Morning released two albums, The Option and Basketball Breakups.

In 2021, the duo announced they had signed with Illinois-based record label Polyvinyl Records along with their fourth album titled Barnyard. The album was released on 22 October 2021. In addition to signing with Polyvinyl, the duo also signed a publishing deal with Sub Pop.

In March 2024, their seventh collection of material, titled Good Morning Seven was released, and became the duo's first album to chart inside the top 100 ARIA charts, debuting at #93. The duo then embarked on a North American tour with Waxahatchee. In November 2024, their eighth album, The Accident was surprise released, with press indicating that it could be the band's last, "at least for now".

== Members ==
- Liam Parsons
- Stefan Blair

=== Members for live performances ===
- James Macleod
- John Considine

== Discography ==
=== Albums ===
List of albums, with selected details
Title	Details	Peak chart positions
Title	Details	AUS
Prize//Reward	Released: March 2018; Label: Bedroom Suck	—
The Option	Released: April 2019; Label: Good Morning Music / Caroline Australia	—
Basketball Breakups	Released: October 2019; Label: Good Morning / Caroline Australia	—
Barnyard	Released: October 2021; Label: Polyvinyl Record Co.	—
Good Morning Seven	Released: 22 March 2024; Label: Good Morning / UMA	93
The Accident	Released: 29 November 2024; Label: Good Morning	—

=== EPs ===
List of EPs, with selected details
Title	Details
Shawcross	Released: November 2014; Label: Good Morning / Caroline Australia
Glory	Released: January 2016; Label: Good Morning Music, Caroline Australia

=== Singles ===
List of singles, with selected details
Title	Details
"A Vessel" / "Radiovoice"	Released: 5 June 2015; Album: None
"On the Street" / "You"	Released: 18 June 2015; Album: None
"Step Aside" / "Oppsie"	Released: 2 November 2016; Album: None
"Escalator" / "Mirror Freak"	Released: 27 March 2018; Album: Prize // Reward
"Just a Man" / "For a Little While"	Released: 17 April 2018; Album: Prize // Reward
"After You"	Released: 8 May 2018; Album: Prize // Reward
"You Up?" / "People Say"	Released: 8 February 2019; Album: The Option
"Sub"	Released: 1 March 2019; Album: The Option
"Blue Tick"	Released: 15 March 2019; Album: The Option
"Take It Easy for Me, Stranger" / "Boy, I'm Just a Loser for Your Love"	Released: 8 August 2019; Album: None
"Mollyduker" / "Keep It"	Released: 28 April 2021; Album: None
"Country"	Released: 12 August 2021; Album: Barnyard
"Out to Pasture" / "Misery"	Released: 23 March 2022; Album: None
"Shameful Thing" (with Alan Dunham)	Released: July 2022; Album: None
"Dog Years" / "Queen of Comedy"	Released: 12 September 2023; Album: Good Morning Seven
"One Night / Real I'm Told"	Released: 28 November 2023; Album: Good Morning Seven
"Just in Time" / "Ahhhh (This Isn't Ideal)"	Released: 23 January 2024; Album: Good Morning Seven
"Excalibur" / "Toy"	Released: 29 February 2024; Album: Good Morning Seven

== Awards and nominations ==
=== AIR Awards ===
The Australian Independent Record Awards (commonly known informally as AIR Awards) is an annual awards night to recognise, promote and celebrate the success of Australia's Independent Music sector.

Year	Nominee / work	Award	Result	Ref.
2025	Good Morning Seven	Best Independent Pop Album or EP	Won	
