= AIR Awards of 2025 =

Annual Australian music awards ceremony

2025 AIR Awards
- Date: 31 July 2025
- Venue: Adelaide Town Hall, Australia
- Hosted by: Dylan Lewis and Jessica Braithwaite

Highlights
- Most wins: Alice Ivy, Amyl & The Sniffers (3)
- Website: https://air.org.au/air-awards/

The 2025 AIR Awards was the nineteenth annual Australian Independent Record Labels Association Music Awards ceremony (generally known as the AIR Awards), and took place on 31 July 2025 in Adelaide. The 2025 AIR Awards introduced a new category; the Independent Mix, Studio or Mastering Engineer of the Year.

Nominations opened up to AIR members on 4 February and closed on 10 March 2025. The nominations were revealed on 13 May 2025.

== Performances ==
- Alice Ivy
- Parvyn
- Queenie
- Emily Wurramara

== Nominees and winners ==
Winners indicated in boldface, with other nominees in plain.

Independent Album of the Year	Independent Song of the Year
**Amyl and the Sniffers - Cartoon Darkness**; Emily Wurramara - Nara; King Stingray - For the Dreams; Royel Otis - Pratts & Pain; The Dreggs - Caught in a Reverie	**Amyl And The Sniffers - "U Should Not Be Doing That"**; Alice Ivy (featuring Josh Teskey) - "Do I Need To Know What Love Is?"; Jem Cassar-Daley - "Big Container"; Ocean Alley - "Tangerine"; Sycco - "Meant to Be"
Breakthrough Independent Artist of the Year	Best Independent Blues and Roots Album or EP
**Miss Kaninna**; 3%; Gut Health; Queenie; The Dreggs	**Emma Donovan - Til My Song Is Done**; Little Quirks - Little Quirks; Mia Dyson - Tender Heart; Queenie - New Moult; Steph Strings - Cradle Mountain
Best Independent Children's Album or EP	Best Independent Classical Album or EP
**Teeny Tiny Stevies - The Green Album**; Bunny Racket - Power; Emma Memma - Twirly Tunes; The Quokkas - Songs for Silly Billies; The Wiggles - The Wiggles Sound System: Rave of Innocence	**Electric Fields & Melbourne Symphony Orchestra - Live in Concert**; Australian Chamber Orchestra - Memoir of a Snail; Katie Noonan & Karin Schaupp - Songs of the Southern Skies Vol 2; Nat Bartsch - Forever Changed; Simon Mavin - Some Days EP
Best Independent Country Album or EP	Best Independent Dance or Electronica Album or EP
**Kasey Chambers - Backbone**; Henry Wagons - The Four Seasons; Lane Pittman - Lane Pittman; Michael Waugh - Beauty & Truth; The Whitlams Black Stump - Kookaburra	**Alice Ivy - Do What Makes You Happy**; 1tbsp - Megacity1000; Confidence Man - 3AM (La La La); Ninajirachi - Girl EDM; Pnau - Hyperbolic
Best Independent Dance, Electronica or Club Single	Best Independent Heavy Album or EP
**Alice Ivy (featuring Josh Teskey) - "Do I Need to Know What Love Is?"**; Confidence Man - "I Can't Lose You"; Haiku Hands - "Kicks"; Moktar - "Haraka ’حركة’"; Odd Mob (featuring Ed Graves) - "Vertigo"	**The Amity Affliction - Let the Ocean Take Me (Redux)**; Northlane - Mirror's Edge; Ocean Grove - Oddworld; Redhook - Mutation; The Southern River Band - D.I.Y.
Best Independent Hip Hop Album or EP	Best Independent Jazz Album or EP
**Miss Kaninna - Kaninna**; 3% - Kill the Dead; Dobby - Warrangu: River Story; Lithe - What Would You Do?; Ziggy Ramo - Human?	**Parvyn - Maujuda**; Claire Cross - Sleep Cycle; Lucy Clifford - Between Spaces of Knowing; Molly Lewis - On the Lips; Sam Anning - Earthen
Best Independent Pop Album or EP	Best Independent Punk Album or EP
**Good Morning - Good Morning Seven**; Annie Hamilton - Stop and Smell the Lightning; Asha Jefferies - Ego Ride; Emma Russack - About the Girl; Sheppard - Zora	**Gut Health - Stiletto**; Don't Thank Me, Spank Me! - Don't Thank Me, Spank Me!; Dune Rats - If It Sucks, Turn It Up; Radio Free Alice - Polyester; Regurgitator - Invader
Best Independent Rock Album or EP	Best Independent Soul/R&B Album or EP
**Amyl and the Sniffers - Cartoon Darkness**; King Stingray - For the Dreams; Party Dozen - Crime in Australia; Royel Otis - Pratts & Pain; The Rions - Happiness in a Place It Shouldn't Be	**Ella Thompson - Ripple On the Wing**; Beckah Amani - This Is How I Remember It; Don West - Don West; Milan Ring - Mangos; Radical Son - Bilambiyal
Independent Marketing Team of the Year	Independent Publicity Team of the Year
**Ourness and The Annex for Royel Otis Pratts & Pain**; ABC Music and The Annex for Emily Wurramara, Nara; Future Classic, The Annex for Sycco, Zorb; GYROstream for Lithe, Fall Back; I Oh You and Mushroom Music for Confidence Man, 3AM (La La La)	**Thinking Loud for Royel Otis Pratts & Pain**; I Oh You and Mushroom Music for Confidence Man 3AM (La La La); Liz Ansley for Emily Wurramara Nara; Super Duper for Radio Free Alice Polyester; Twnty Three PR for The Rions Happiness in a Place It Shouldn't Be
Independent Producer of the Year	Independent Music Video of the Year
**Alice Ivy for Alice Ivy Do What Makes You Happy**; Bonnie Knight for Coldwave The Ants/italia '06; Dave Hammer for Lime Cordiale Enough of the Sweet Talk; Nick Didia for Ocean Alley Tangerine; Nina Wilson for Ninajirachi Girl EDM	**Nick Rae, Jordan Ruyi Blanch for 3% (featuring Jessica Mauboy) "Won't Stop"**; Claudia Sangiorgi Dalimore for Emily Wurramara (featuring Tasman Keith) "Lordy Lordy"; Pond for Pond "(I'm) Stung"; Rosemary Whatmuff for Kasey Chambers "Backbone (The Desert Child)"; Stephanie Jane Day for Emma Russack "Everything Is Big"
Best Independent Label	Independent Mix, Studio or Mastering Engineer of the Year
**ABC Music**; Dinosaur City; Etcetc; I Oh You; Impressed Recordings	**Nick Herrera for Miss Kaninna Kaninna**; Robert Muinos for Rowena Wise Senseless Acts of Beauty; Rohan Sforcina and Lachlan Carrick for Emma Donovan Til My Song Is Done; Steven Schram for Crowded House Gravity Stairs; Tom Iansek for Tom Snowdon Lonely Tree
Outstanding Achievement Award
**David Bridie**

== See also ==
- Music of Australia
