= Drmngnow =

Indigenous Australian rapper

- Born: Neil Morris; Victoria, Australia
- Origin: Victoria, Australia
- Genre: Australian hip hop
- Occupation: Rapper
- Instrument: Vocals
- Years active: 2018–present
- Label: 779117 DK

Neil Morris, known professionally as Drmngnow (stylised in all caps), is an Aboriginal Australian rapper, dancer, artist, and actor.

== Culture ==
A Yorta Yorta/Kaieltheban man, Morris' stage name is a contraction of the phrase "dreaming now", referring to the Aboriginal concept of The Dreaming.

== Early life and education ==
Morris grew up on Yorta Yorta Country in Shepparton, a city in rural Victoria, Australia. He was first exposed to music via his parents' record collection that included Michael Jackson, Guns N' Roses, Midnight Oil, and Blondie.

As a teen he discovered hip-hop, collating and trading cassette tapes of hip-hop artists Ice-T, N.W.A., Ice Cube, De La Soul, A Tribe Called Quest, and Wu Tang Clan. He and his friends also played basketball.

After leaving school, he felt lost, feeling pain and grief and using drugs to numb his emotions. In 2001 he moved to the Melbourne's northern suburbs, and started studying for a Bachelor of Arts with a focus on creative writing, at the same time writing poetry. However he started experiencing thoughts of suicide by the end of 2002. He did a traineeship in conservation and land management and through his twenties travelled and worked seasonally in the rural sector.

== Music ==
Morris started making his own music when he started to play guitar in 2005, learning "Come as You Are" by Nirvana, with his brother, and first performed on stage in 2015.

He uses his music as to explore culture, community and country, and provokes discussion and education around Australia's Indigenous history and future. He sings in Yorta Yorta.

In November 2022, he collaborated with other First Nations artists Emma Donovan, Emily Wurramara, DOBBY, and Optamus to create a song in memory of Cassius Turvey, a Noongar-Yamatji boy who had died at the age of 15 the result of an assault by a random attacker when walking home from school in Perth, Western Australia. The song, titled "Forever 15", was played at Turvey's funeral on 18 November 2022 funeral and released three days later on 21 November 2022.

== Discography ==
=== Singles ===
==== As lead artist ====
List of singles, with year released, selected certifications and album name shown
Title	Year	Album
"Australia Does Not Exist" (featuring Philly, Adrian Eagle, Culture Evolves and Pataphysics)	2018	Non-album singles
"Indigenous Land"	2018	Non-album singles
"Ancestors" (featuring Kee'Ahn)	2019	Non-album singles
"We See You"	2019	Non-album singles
"Always Remember" (featuring Kee'Ahn, Paul Gorrie and Pataphysics)	2019	Non-album singles
"Survive" (featuring River Boy)	2020	Non-album singles
"Never Defeated"	2020	Non-album singles
"Get Back to the Land" (featuring Emily Wurramara)	2020	Deadly Hearts: Walking Together

=== Other appearances ===
List of other non-single song appearances
Title	Year	Album
"IndiGenius" (with Rush Wepiha)	2019	IndiGenius
"Medicine Weapon" (with Kosmic Force)	2021	Sound of a Weapon

== Awards and nominations ==
=== Music Victoria Awards ===
The Music Victoria Awards are an annual awards night celebrating Victorian music. They commenced in 2006.

Year	Nominee / work	Award	Result	Ref.
2018	Drmngnow	Best Hip Hop Act	Nominated	
2019	Drmngnow	Best Solo Artist	Nominated	
2019	Drmngnow	Breakthrough Victorian Act	Nominated	
2019	Drmngnow	Best Hip Hop Act	Nominated	
2019	Drmngnow	The Archie Roach Foundation Award for Emerging Talent	Nominated	
2020	Drmngnow	Best Electronic Act	Nominated	
2020	Drmngnow	Best Hip Hop Act	Nominated	
2021	Drmngnow	Best Hip Hop Act	Won	
2024	"Ngarwu"	Best Song or Track	Nominated	
