= AIR Awards of 2019 =

Annual Australian music awards ceremony

- Date: 25 July 2019
- Venue: Freemasons Hall, Adelaide, Australia

Highlights
- Most wins: Courtney Barnett (2)
- Most nominations: Courtney Barnett, Gurrumul and Laura Jean (3)
- Website: https://air.org.au/air-awards/

The AIR Awards of 2019 is the thirteenth annual Australian Independent Record Labels Association Music Awards (generally known as the AIR Awards) and was an award ceremony at Freemasons Hall Adelaide, Australia on Thursday 25 July 2019.

The award for Best Independent Album was a tie between Courtney Barnett and Gurrumul.

== Performers ==
- B Wise - "The Key"
- G Flip - "About You"
- Laura Jean - "Girls on the TV"
- Mojo Juju - "Native Tongue"
- West Thebarton

== Outstanding Achievement Award ==
- Gerarda McKenna

== Nominees and winners ==
=== AIR Awards ===
Winners are listed first and highlighted in boldface; other final nominees are listed alphabetically.

Best Independent Artist	Best Independent Album or EP
**Courtney Barnett**; Gurrumul; Julia Jacklin; Laura Jean; Methyl Ethel	**Courtney Barnett - Tell Me How You Really Feel**; **Gurrumul - Djarimirri**; Emma Louise – Lilac Everything; Laura Jean – Devotion; Rolling Blackouts Coastal Fever – Hope Downs
Best Independent Single	Breakthrough Independent Artist of the Year
**Mojo Juju - "Native Tongue"**; A.B. Original – "Blaccout"; Courtney Barnett – "Nameless, Faceless"; G Flip – "About You"; Laura Jean – "Girls on the TV"	**G Flip**; Confidence Man; Didirri; Emily Wurramara; Hatchie
Best Independent Blues and Roots Album	Best Independent Classical Album
**Emily Wurramara - Milyakburra**; Dan Sultan – Killer Under a Blood Moon; Gabriella Cohen – Pink Is the Colour of Unconditional Love'; John Butler Trio – Home; Mia Dyson – If I Said Only So Far I Take It Back	**Grigoryan Brothers, Adelaide Symphony Orchestra & Benjamin Northey - Bach Concertos**; ACO Collective – Collective Wisdom; Gurrumul – Djarimirri; Nicole Car, Australian Chamber Orchestra & Richard Tognetti – Heroines
Best Independent Country Album	Best Independent Dance/Electronica Album or EP
**Beccy Cole - Lioness**; Halfway – Rain Lover; Lachlan Bryan and the Wildes – Some Girls (QUITE) Like Country Music; The Wolfe Brothers – Country Heart; William Alexander – The Kid from Bourke	**Confidence Man - Confident Music for Confident People**; Braille Face – Lightletting; Nina Las Vegas – Lucky Girl; Paces – Zag; Total Giovanni – Euphoria
Best Independent Dance, Electronica or Club Single	Best Independent Hard Rock, Heavy or Punk Album
**What So Not featuring Winona Oak - "Beautiful"**; Dom Dolla – "Take It"; Fisher – "Losing It"; Hermitude featuring Bibi Bourelly – "Stupid World"; Odd Mob – "Intrinsic"	**DZ Deathrays - Bloody Lovely**; Camp Cope – How to Socialise & Make Friends; High Tension – Purge; Little Ugly Girls – Little Ugly Girls; West Thebarton – Different Beings Being Different
Best Independent Hip Hop Album	Best Independent Jazz Album
**B Wise - Area Famous**; Cool Out Sun – Cool Out Sun; Milwaukee Banks – No Time; Space Invadas – Wild World; Tasman Keith – Mission Famous	**Jonathan Zwartz - Animarum**; Harry James Angus – Struggle With Glory; James Morrison, William Morrison, Harry Morrison & Patrick Danao – Midnight Till Dawn; Mildlife – Phase
Best Independent Label
**Chapter Music**

== See also ==
- Music of Australia
