= Dobby (musician) =

Australian musician

Rhyan Clapham, known by his stage name Dobby (stylised as DOBBY), is a Filipino-Aboriginal Australian musician. He describes himself as a "drapper", a contraction of rapper and drummer, although he also plays other instruments and is also a composer. Dobby is also a workshop facilitator and speaker. In 2018, he spoke at Vivid Ideas at Sydney's Vivid festival, and in 2019 at the JLF Adelaide (Jaipur Literature Festival in Adelaide, South Australia). He is known for his 2024 album Warrangu: River Story, for which he won an ARIA Music Award.

== Early life and education ==
Rhyan Clapham was born in Wollongong, New South Wales. In 1985, his mother had emigrated from Tacloban in the Philippines, while his father is from Brewarrina, New South Wales, Australia. His father's mother was a Muruwari woman from Ngemba country in Brewarrina. He is a member of the Murrawarri Republic in Brewarrina.

Clapham studied classical piano in primary school from the age of seven, achieving AMEB Grade 6 in piano, and Grade 2 Musicianship. He then went on to study jazz drumming in high school, from age 14. He began listening to rappers like Outkast, Eminem, and 50 Cent, before turning to "more nuanced sounds of the culture", such as Lauryn Hill, Common, the Pharcyde, J Dilla, and MF Doom. Clapham acquired the nickname Dobby in primary school.

He earned a Bachelor of Music degree at UNSW, specialising in percussion and piano. In 2015 he completed honours in Indigenous Studies, also at UNSW, focusing on Aboriginal hip hop music.

== Musical career ==
Clapham describes himself as a "drapper", a contraction of the words rapper and drummer. He also plays piano.

In 2017 Clapham was awarded the Peter Sculthorpe Fellowship, an award for emerging composers and performers worth A$30,000. He used the award to develop his musicianship, and, in particular, to further his work on the stories of the Brewarrina Ngunnhu (Ngemba for "fish traps").

In 2018, he released his debut self-titled EP. In October of that year, he appeared in Adelaide as part of the OzAsia Festival, headlining a show at Nexus Arts, supported by DyspOra and ELSY.

In April 2019, Dobby performed at the Boomerang Festival, a section of Bluesfest at Byron Bay dedicated to Indigenous performance, art and culture.

In October 2019 he performed OzAsia in Adelaide. The online magazine Clothesline gave the performance five stars. Also in 2019, he released a cover version of "We Have Survived" by Aboriginal band No Fixed Address.

His 2020 single "I Can't Breathe", featuring BARKAA, became an anthem for the Black Lives Matter movement in Australia, and has been incorporated into some school curricula. The song references a number of issues specific to Indigenous Australians, such as the forced removal of children from families in the past, the high levels of Indigenous Australian incarceration, Aboriginal deaths in custody. "I Can't Breathe" won Best Video at the FBi SMAC Awards in 2020. Dobby performed alongside BARKAA at the Sydney New Year's Eve celebrations in 2021/22.

In June 2022, DOBBY presented Warrangu: River Story at the Art Gallery of New South Wales in partnership with Vivid Sydney. The project is an eight-track video which tells a story about the use and misuse of the land and rivers around the river system around Brewarrina.

In November 2022, he collaborated with other First Nations artists Emma Donovan, Emily Wurramara, Drmngnow, and Optamus to create a song in memory of Cassius Turvey, a Noongar-Yamatji boy who had died at the age of 15 the result of an assault by a random attacker when walking home from school in Perth, Western Australia. The song, titled "Forever 15", was played at Turvey's funeral on 18 November 2022 and was released three days later on 21 November 2022.

In May 2023, Dobby released the single "Walk Away"" which critiques the constant dismissal and erasure of Australia's indigenous history and colonialism.

In December 2023, Dobby released "Dirrpi Yuin Patjulinya", the lead single from his debut album, Warrangu: River Story. This was followed in January 2024 with "Ancestor". Warrangu: River Story was released on 14 June 2024. At the 2024 ARIA Music Awards, the album won ARIA Award for Best World Music Album.

In 2024, Dobby was narrator for Baleen Moondjan, a work commissioned by the Adelaide Festival, created by former Bangarra Dance Theatre artistic director Stephen Page, performed on the beach at Glenelg. With music composed by Steve Francis, the performance combined contemporary dance, storytelling, and songs in English, Jandai, and Gumbaynggirr/Yaegl languages.

In January 2025, Christine Anu released the Dobby produced song "Piki Lullaby"

In February 2026, Dobby announced his second album Marshmallow will be released on 20 June 2026.

=== Jackie Brown Jr ===
DOBBY raps with a band called Jackie Brown Jr. The five members of the indie rock and soul band met while studying music in 2013. In October 2018 they released their debut EP Over-Abroad, and toured the country during the following two months. The band members are:

- Madeleine Mallis (of Good Pash) – lead vocalist and saxophonist
- Rhyan Clapham (DOBBY) – drummer, MC
- Michael J Brady – guitarist and keyboard player
- Gideon Traurig – bass
- Hilary Geddes (of The Buoys) – guitar

== Musical style and themes ==
DOBBY believes that hip hop music is a powerful educational tool:

Hip hop is a conduit to your story, and your own expression of self. No one can take that story away from you, especially when you shout those words out over a beat that leaves people dancing all night. Your entire story in 16 bars, 32 bars, it reaches their ears... In Australia, we use hip hop to educate, express, and bring people together. For our mob in particular, we use it to also empower and strengthen, and speak truths about injustices.

== Discography ==
=== Albums ===
List of albums, with selected details
Title	Details
Warrangu: River Story	Scheduled: 14 June 2024; Format: CD, digital; Label: ABC Music (ABCM0024)
Marshmallow	Scheduled: 31 July 2026; Format: CD, digital; Label: ABC Music (ABCM0061)

=== Extended Plays ===
List of EPs, with selected details
Title	Details
Dobby	Released: 4 September 2018; Format: Digital; Label: Dobby

=== Singles ===
Title	Year	Album
"Peregrine"	2018	Dobby (EP)
"My Mind"	2018	Dobby (EP)
"Falling Down" (Dion Condack featuring Dobby)	2018	Non-album single
"I Can't Breathe" (with Barkaa)	2020	TBA
"Susie Q" (with Jackie Brown Jr)	2022	TBA
"Ric"	2022	TBA
"Walk Away" (featuring The Merindas)	2022	TBA
"That's Not Me" (featuring L-FRESH the Lion)	2022	TBA
"Dirrpi Yuin Patjulinya"	2023	Warrangu: River Story
"Ancestor"	2024	Warrangu: River Story
"Matter of Time"	2024	Warrangu: River Story
"Language is in the Land"	2024	Warrangu: River Story
"Get Up" (with True Vibenation and Billie Rose)	2025	
"Fight (Kim's Song)"	2025	Marshmallow
"Good for Nothing"	2026	Marshmallow
"FU+U+U" (with Djanaba and Kayps)	2026	TBA
"Sabotage!" (featuring Josh Pyke)	2026	Marshmallow
"≠ (Free Your Mind)"	2026	Marshmallow
"Older"	2026	Marshmallow

=== Other appearances ===
List of other non-single song appearances
Title	Year	Album
"We Have Survived"	2019	Deadly Hearts 2
"1770"	2020	Ngarra-Burria Piyanna: Indigenous composers make an old piano sing
"Bars of Steel" (Triple J Like a Version)	2024	Triple J Like a Version

== Awards and nominations ==
=== AIR Awards ===
The Australian Independent Record Awards (commonly known informally as AIR Awards) is an annual awards night to recognise, promote and celebrate the success of Australia's Independent Music sector.

Year	Nominee / work	Award	Result	Ref.
2025	Warrangu: River Story	Best Independent Hip Hop Album or EP	Nominated	

=== ARIA Music Awards ===
The ARIA Music Awards is an annual ceremony presented by Australian Recording Industry Association (ARIA), which recognise excellence, innovation, and achievement across all genres of the music of Australia. They commenced in 1987.

Year	Nominee / work	Award	Result	Ref.
2024	Warangu; River Story	Best World Music Album	Won	
2026	Tony Buchen for Dobby – Marshmellow	Best Engineered Release	Nominated	

=== Australian Music Prize ===
The Australian Music Prize (the AMP) is an annual award of $50,000 given to an Australian band or solo artist in recognition of the merit of an album released during the year of award. They commenced in 2005.

Year	Nominee / work	Award	Result	Ref.
2024	Warrangu: River Story	Australian Music Prize	Nominated	

=== Environmental Music Prize ===
The Environmental Music Prize is a quest to find a theme song to inspire action on climate and conservation. It commenced in 2022.

Year	Nominee / work	Award	Result	Ref.
2025	"Dirrpi Yuin Patjulinya"	Environmental Music Prize	Nominated	

=== J Awards ===
The J Awards are an annual series of Australian music awards that were established by the Australian Broadcasting Corporation's youth-focused radio station Triple J. They commenced in 2005.

Year	Nominee / work	Award	Result	Ref.
2024	Dobby	Double J Artist of the Year	Nominated	

=== National Indigenous Music Awards ===
The National Indigenous Music Awards recognise excellence, innovation and leadership among Aboriginal and Torres Strait Islander musicians from throughout Australia. They commenced in 2004. The National Indigenous Music Awards is an annual awards ceremony that recognises the achievements of Indigenous Australians in music.

Year	Nominee / work	Award	Result	Ref.
2022	Dobby	New Talent of the Year	Nominated	
2022	Dobby	Archie Roach Foundation Award	Won	

=== National Live Music Awards ===
The National Live Music Awards (NLMAs) commenced in 2016 to recognize contributions to the live music industry in Australia.

Year	Nominee / work	Award	Result	Ref.
2023	Dobby	Best Live Drummer	Nominated	
