= Radical Son =

- Also known as: Dave Clive
- Born: Dave Leha
- Genres: Soul, hip hop, reggae, dub, R’n’B
- Instrument: Vocals
- Label: Wantok Musik

David Leha, known professionally as Radical Son, is a First Nations, Kamilaroi and Tongan singer. He was part of the GetUp Mob, which released a cover version of "From Little Things Big Things Grow" in May 2008; it reached No. 4 on the ARIA Singles Chart. Other members of the temporary group were the song's writers Kev Carmody and Paul Kelly together with Urthboy, Missy Higgins, Mia Dyson, Jane Tyrrell, Dan Sultan, Joel Wenitong and Ozi Batla.

Radical Son's second studio album, Cause 'n Effect was released through Wantok Music in October 2014 and features appearances by Archie Roach, Emma Donovan, and Deline Briscoe. He was a cast member of The Rabbits with music by Kate Miller-Heidke, an opera based on the book The Rabbits by John Marsden and Shaun Tan. The Rabbits won four Helpmann Awards. In 2016 Radical Son performed at WOMADelaide.

In 2017, he recorded "Leave Them Tents Alone!!", sung to the tune of Pink Floyd's "Another Brick in the Wall (Part II)", to protest the subsequent removal of homeless people's tents and belongings by Sydney City Council from the centre of Sydney.

== Discography ==
=== Albums ===
List of Albums
Title	Album details
Radical Son	Released: 11 July 2005 (Australia); Label: David Leha; Format: Digital download
Cause 'n Affect	Released: 10 October 2014 (Australia); Label: Wantok Music; Format: Digital download
Bilambiyal	Released: 12 July 2024; Label: Wantok Music; Format: Digital download

== Awards and nominations ==
=== AIR Awards ===
The Australian Independent Record Awards (commonly known informally as AIR Awards) is an annual awards night to recognise, promote and celebrate the success of Australia's Independent Music sector.

Year	Nominee / work	Award	Result	Ref.
2025	Bilambiyal	Best Independent Soul/R&B Album or EP	Nominated	

=== ARIA Music Awards ===
The ARIA Music Awards is an annual ceremony presented by Australian Recording Industry Association (ARIA), which recognise excellence, innovation, and achievement across all genres of the music of Australia. They commenced in 1987.

Year	Nominee / work	Award	Result	Ref.
2024	Bilambiyal	Best World Music Album	Nominated	

=== National Indigenous Music Awards ===
The National Indigenous Music Awards is an annual awards ceremony that recognises the achievements of Indigenous Australians in music.

Year	Nominee / work	Award	Result	Ref.
2025	Radical Son	Artist of the Year	Nominated	
2025	"Bilambiyal"	Film Clip of the Year	Nominated	
