= National Indigenous Music Awards 2025 =

Edition of Australian music awards

- Date: 9 August 2025
- Venue: Darwin Amphitheatre, Northern Territory, Australia
- Hosted by: Elanie Crombie and Ben Graetz

Highlights
- Most wins: Emily Wurramara and Andrew Gurruwiwi Band (2)
- Most nominations: 3% and Emily Wurramara (4)
- Website: nima.musicnt.com.au

Internet coverage
- Network: YouTube

The 22nd National Indigenous Music Awards took place on 9 August 2025. Nominations were open from 23 May 2025 and closed on 16 June 2025.

Nominations were announced on 7 July 2025 during NAIDOC Week.

In 2025, the event began a partnership with YouTube and the ceremony was livestreamed globally on the platform.

== Performers ==
Performers at the event were:

- Barkaa
- Troy Cassar-Daley
- Kobie Dee
- Emma Donovan
- Eleanor Jawurlngali & Mick Turner
- Jessica Mauboy
- Kankawa Nagarra
- Velvet Trip

== Hall of Fame inductee ==
- Jessica Mauboy

== Triple J Unearthed National Indigenous Winner ==
- Drifting Clouds

== Awards ==
The nominations were revealed on 7 July 2025. Winners indicated in boldface, with other nominees in plain.

Artist of the Year

Artist	Result
3%	Nominated
Birdz and Fred Leone	Nominated
Emma Donovan	Nominated
Jessica Mauboy	Nominated
King Stingray	Nominated
Radical Son	Nominated
**Emily Wurramara**	Won

Best New Talent of the Year

Artist	Result
**Andrew Gurruwiwi Band**	Won
Drifting Clouds	Nominated
Miss Kaninna	Nominated
Ripple Effect Band	Nominated
Tjaka	Nominated

Album of the Year

Artist and album	Result
3% - Kill the Dead	Nominated
Andrew Gurruwiwi Band – Sing Your Own Song	Nominated
**Barkaa – Big Tidda**	Won
Emily Wurramara – Nara	Nominated
King Stingray – For the Dreams	Nominated

Film Clip of the Year

Artist and song	Result
3% featuring Jessica Mauboy – "Won't Stop"	Nominated
Andrew Gurruwiwi Band – "Wata Mäwi"	Nominated
Barkaa featuring Leroy Johnson – "Ngmaka"	Nominated
**Emily Wurramara featuring Tasman Keith – "Lordy Lordy"**	Won
King Stingray – "Day Off"	Nominated
Radical Son – "Bilambiyal"	Nominated

Song of the Year

Artist and song	Result
3% featuring Jessica Mauboy – "Won't Stop"	Nominated
**Andrew Gurruwiwi Band – "Once Upon a Time"**	Won
Barkaa featuring Leroy Johnson – "Ngmaka"	Nominated
Emily Wurramara – "S.T.F.A.F.M."	Nominated
Jem Cassar-Daley - "Kiss Me Like You're Leaving"	Nominated
The Kid Laroi - "Girls"	Nominated

Community Clip of the Year

Artist and song	Result
**Bulman School & Community – "Crocodile Style"**	Won
Bulman School & Community – "My Story of Songline Mata"	Nominated
Bulman School & Community - "Strong Bala Wei"	Nominated
Kalkaringi School - "Gurindji Dream Big (Kuni-jungkarni)"	Nominated
Mapoon Community - "Mapoon - Breathe In Breathe Out"	Nominated
Warmun Community - "Turkey Creek"	Nominated
