= Tender Heart (Mia Dyson album) =

Studio album by Mia Dyson
- Released: 23 February 2024
- Label: Mia Dyson
- Producer: Scott Hirsch

Mia Dyson chronology
Parking Lots Revisited (2020)	Tender Heart (2024)

Tender Heart is the seventh studio album from Australian blues and roots musician, Mia Dyson. The album was released on 23 February 2024.

At the 2024 ARIA Music Awards, it won Best Blues and Roots Album.

At the AIR Awards of 2025, the album was nominated for Best Independent Blues and Roots Album or EP.

== Reception ==
Double J said "Musically, the record shimmers as beautifully as any of Dyson's best work. Her rich and expressive voice melds with stunning guitars and pianos to great effect yet again." The Australian gave the album four stars and wrote: "The eclecticism on her seventh album is evidence of how far this expat Australian has come as a singer, songwriter and guitarist since her 2003 debut." Rolling Stone Australia listed the album as the 45th best Australian album of 2024, calling it "[...] a beautiful, gut-wrenching account of the physical and emotional aftermath of a near-death experience."

== Track listing ==
1. "Dare" - 3:53
2. "Ragged Friend" - 3:27
3. "Dragging Me Down" - 3:24
4. "Golden Light" - 3:05
5. "Sunny Hills" - 3:47
6. "Thank You" - 3:53
7. "These Words" - 2:13
8. "Come to Me" - 3:59
9. "Middle Lion" - 3:33
10. "Worship" - 2:46

== Charts ==
Chart performance for Tender Heart
Chart (2024)	Peak position
Australia Jazz and Blues Albums (ARIA)	3
