= Emily Wurramara =

Indigenous Australian singer-songwriter and activist

- Wurramara speaking with WOW Sounds Presents in July 2020

Background information
- Origin: Australia
- Genres: Folk; blues; roots; rock; indie; Indigenous
- Occupations: Singer; songwriter; director; activist
- Website: www.emilywurramara.com.au

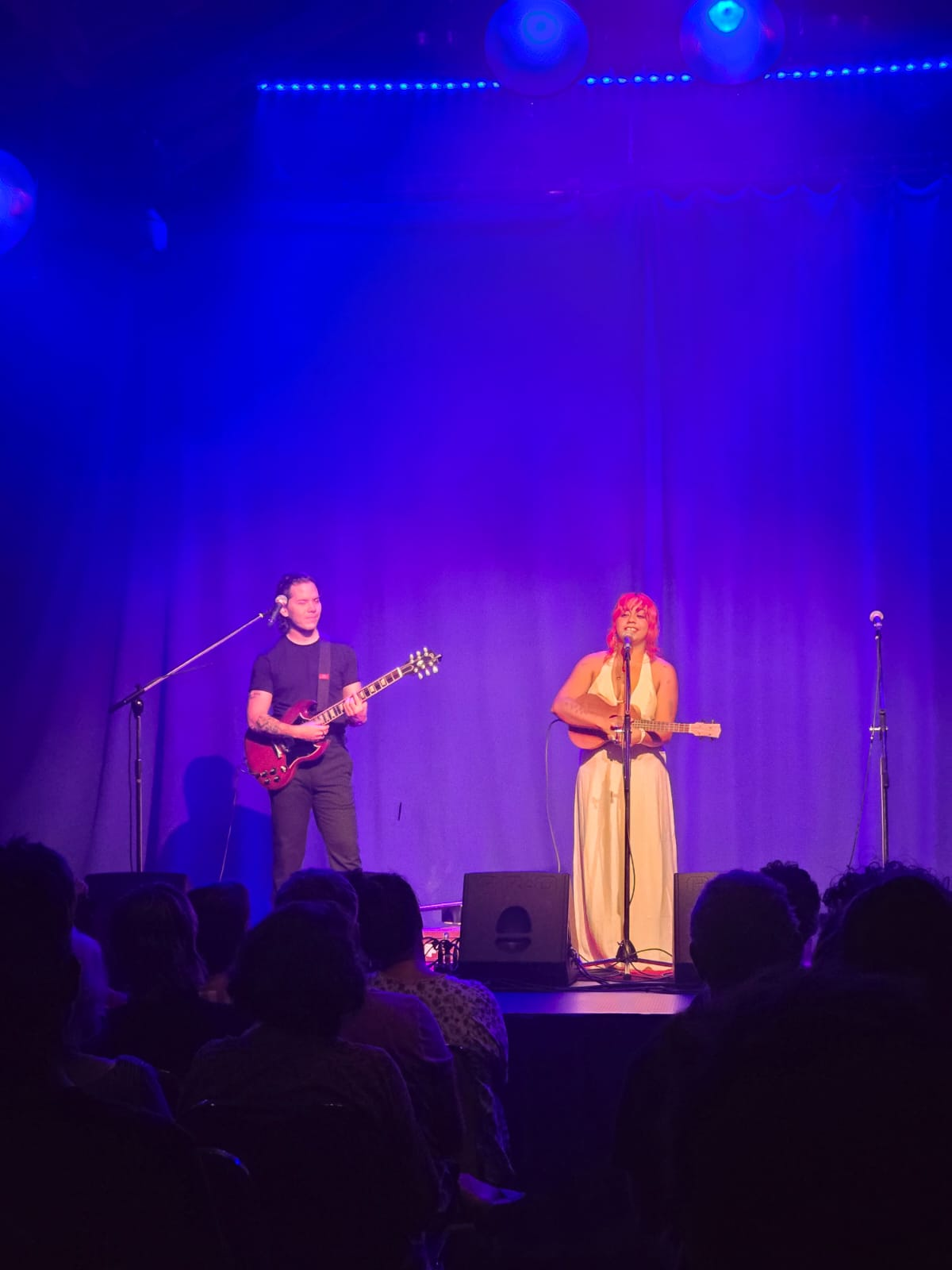
Wurramara performing as a part of her Adore Me Tour at the Brunswick Picture House, October 2025

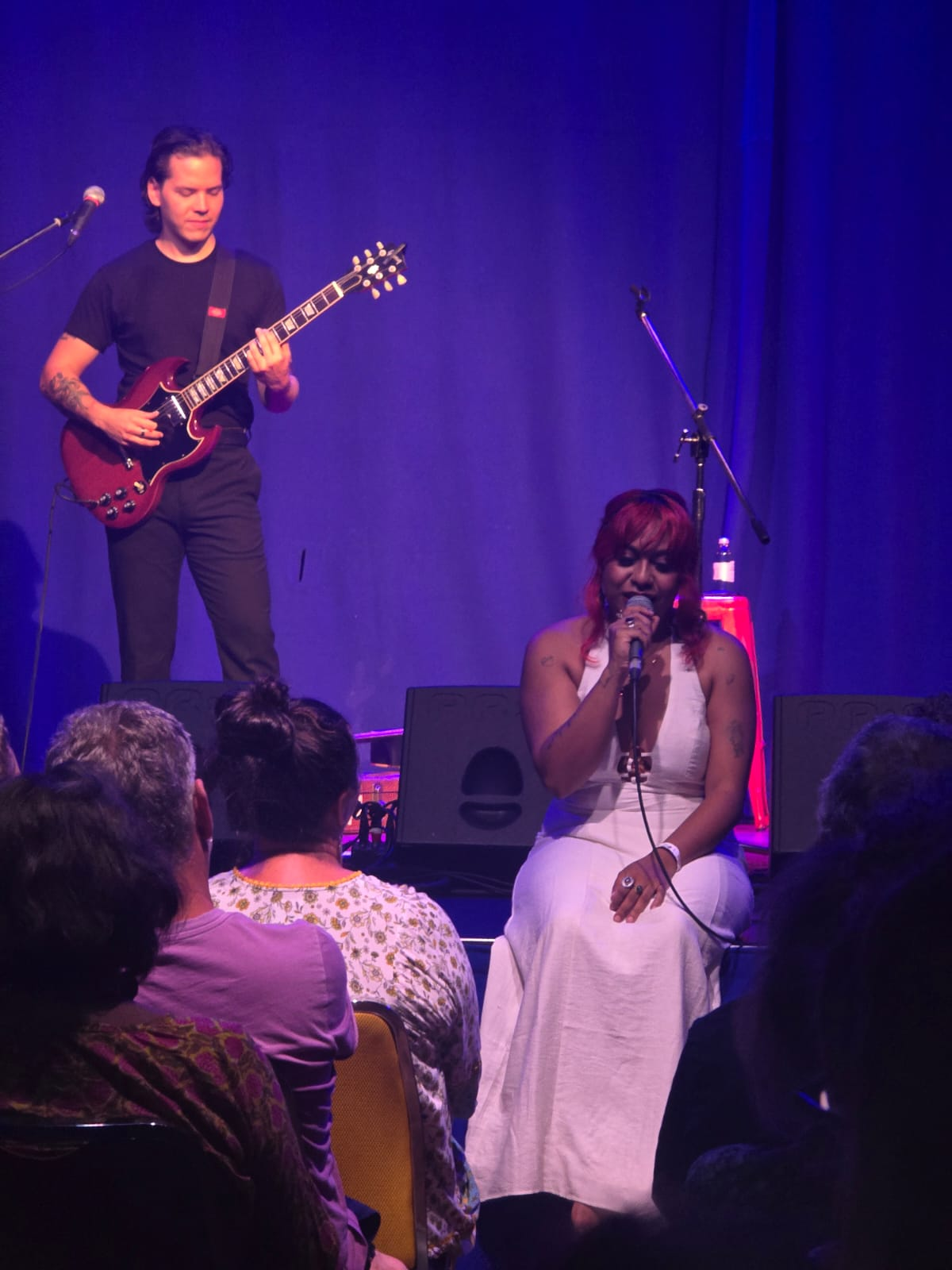
Wurramara at the Brunswick Picture House, October 2025

Emily Wurramara is an Indigenous Australian / Filipino singer and songwriter. At the 2024 ARIA Music Awards, she won the ARIA Award for Best Adult Contemporary Album, making her the first Indigenous woman to ever win in this category.

== Early life ==
Emily Wurramara moved between Groote Eylandt and Bickerton Island (Milyakburra), two islands in the Gulf of Carpentaria off the coast of the Northern Territory, until she was six years old. Her father is of Filipino, Chinese, and Spanish descent, who grew up on the Philippine island of Negros. Her mother is a Warninidlyakwa/Greek/Italian/Turkish woman who grew up on the two islands.

Emily grew up in Brisbane after her family moved there when she was six. As a child, she wrote songs and poetry, and listened to Coloured Stone and Yothu Yindi on her grandparents' cassette player. She later listened to Billie Holiday, rapper Lauryn Hill, Beyoncé, and American country singer Alan Jackson.

== Career ==
Wurramara writes and sings in both English and Anindilyakwa, and plays six instruments, including piano and violin.

In 2016, she released her debut EP, Black Smoke, which was featured on triple j unearthed and earned her a Queensland Music Award. She followed it up with an album named Milyakburra in 2018 and toured nationally with Alice Skye. Milyakburra is named after the island of Milyakburra, sacred to Wurramara and her people. Family members feature on the album, including Wurramara's Uncle Enoch singing on track "Title" and her great-grandmother on "Carry Me Home". The album art is by her grandmother.

In November 2022, she collaborated with other First Nations artists Emma Donovan, DOBBY, Drmngnow, and Optamus to create a song in memory of Cassius Turvey, a Noongar-Yamatji boy who had died at the age of 15 the result of an assault by a random attacker when walking home from school in Perth, Western Australia. The song, titled "Forever 15", was played at Turvey's funeral on 18 November 2022 funeral and released three days later on 21 November 2022.

Wurramara appeared on the cover of Coles supermarket chain's Health and Beauty magazine for Winter 2023, alongside Noongar singer Bumpy.

In July 2024, Wurramara announced the release of her second studio album Nara. The album was released on 23 August 2024. The album was supported with a national tour, and won Best Adult Contemporary Album at the 2024 ARIA Awards. She is the first Indigenous woman to win in this category at the ARIA Awards.

== Personal life ==
Wurramara has a daughter, born in 2017.

On 2 May 2019, a fire at her home in Brisbane destroyed most of her belongings.

== Discography ==
=== Albums ===
Title	Details
Milyakburra	Release date: June 2018; Label: Wantok Music (W0020); Formats: Digital download, CD
Nara	Scheduled: 23 August 2024; Label: ABC Music (ABCM0035); Formats: CD, LP, digital

=== Extended plays ===
Title	Details
Black Smoke	Release date: June 2016; Label: Emily Wurramara; Formats: Digital download
Ayarra Emeba (Calm Songs)	Release date: February 2022; Label: ABC; Formats: digital download

=== Singles ===
Year	Title	Album
2016	"Ngerraberrakernama (Wake Up)"	Black Smoke
2016	"Ngayuwa Nalyelyingminama (I Love You)"	Black Smoke
2016	"Black Smoke"	Black Smoke
2016	"Ementha-Papaguneray (Turtle Song)"	Milyakburra
2017	"Hey Love"	Milyakburra
2019	"Yuwani" (with Mambali)	non album singles
2019	"Laughing Buddha" (with Chong Ali)	non album singles
2019	"Black Boy" (with Flewnt)	non album singles
2020	"Trust" (with Kuya James)	non album singles
2020	"Cruisin'"	non album singles
2024	"Magic Woman Dancing"	Nara
2024	"Midnight Blues"	Nara
2024	"Lordy Lordy" (with Tasman Keith)	Nara

=== Non-single album appearances ===
Year	Title	Album
2017	"Black Boy"	Deadly Hearts
2020	"Get Back to the Land" (with DRMNGNOW)	Deadly Hearts: Walking Together
2022	"Dressing Up"	ReWiggled
2024	"So High" (with PNAU)	Hyperbolic

== Awards and nominations ==
=== AIR Awards ===
The Australian Independent Record Awards (commonly known informally as AIR Awards) is an annual awards night to recognise, promote and celebrate the success of Australia's Independent Music sector.

Year	Nominee / work	Award	Result	Ref.
2019	Emily Wurramara	Breakthrough Independent Artist	Nominated	
2019	Milyakburra	Best Independent Blues and Roots Album	Won	
2023	Ayarra Emeba (Calm Songs)	Best Independent Children's Album or EP	Nominated	
2025	Nara	Independent Album of the Year	Nominated	
2025	Claudia Sangiorgi Dalimore for Emily Wurramara (featuring Tasman Keith) "Lordy Lordy"	Independent Music Video of the Year	Nominated	
2025	ABC Music and The Annex for Nara	Independent Marketing Team of the Year	Nominated	
2025	Liz Ansley for Nara	Independent Publicity Team of the Year	Nominated	

=== APRA Music Awards ===
The APRA Music Awards were established by Australasian Performing Right Association (APRA) in 1982 to honour the achievements of songwriters and music composers, and to recognise their song writing skills, sales and airplay performance, by its members annually.

Year	Nominee / work	Award	Result	Ref.
2025	Emily Wurramara	Emerging Songwriter of the Year	Nominated	
2026	"Adore Me" (Emily Wurramara and Caiti Baker)	Song of the Year	Shortlisted	
2026	Emily Wurramara	Emerging Songwriter of the Year	Won	

=== ARIA Music Awards ===
The ARIA Music Awards is an annual awards ceremony that recognises excellence, innovation, and achievement across all genres of Australian music.

Year	Nominee / work	Award	Result	Ref.
2018	Milyakburra	Best Blues & Roots Album	Nominated	
2024	Nara	Best Adult Contemporary Album	Won	
2024	Nara	Best Independent Release	Nominated	
2025	Claudia Sangiorgi Dalimore for Emily Wurramara – "Lordy Lordy"	Best Video	Nominated	

=== Environmental Music Prize ===
The Environmental Music Prize is a quest to find a theme song to inspire action on climate and conservation. It commenced in 2022.

Year	Nominee / work	Award	Result	Ref.
2022	"When a Tree Falls" (The Boy of Many Colors featuring Emily Wurramara)	Environmental Music Prize	Nominated	
2023	"Lady Blue"	Environmental Music Prize	Nominated	

=== J Awards ===
The J Awards are an annual series of Australian music awards that were established by the Australian Broadcasting Corporation's youth-focused radio station Triple J. They commenced in 2005.

Year	Nominee / work	Award	Result	Ref.
2024	"Lordy Lordy" (featuring Tasman Keith); Directed by Claudia Sangiorgi Dalimore	Australian Video of the Year	Won	
2024	Emily Wurramara	Double J Artist of the Year	Nominated	
2025	Emily Wurramara	Double J Artist of the Year	Nominated	

=== National Indigenous Music Awards ===
The National Indigenous Music Awards (NIMA) is an annual award ceremony and recognises excellence, dedication, innovation and outstanding contribution to the Northern Territory music industry.

Year	Nominee / work	Award	Result	! Ref.
2017	"Herself"	New Talent of the Year	Nominated	
2017	"Hey Love"	Song of the Year	Nominated	
2018	"Herself"	New Talent of the Year	Nominated	
2018	Milyakburra	Album of the Year	Nominated	
2020	"Herself"	Artist of the Year	Nominated	
2025	Emily Wurramara	Artist of the Year	Won	
2025	Nara	Album of the Year	Nominated	
2025	"Lordy Lordy"	Film Clip of the Year	Won	
2025	"S.T.F.A.F.M."	Song of the Year	Nominated	

=== National Live Music Awards ===
The National Live Music Awards (NLMAs) commenced in 2016 to recognise contributions to the live music industry in Australia.

Year	Nominee / work	Award	Result	Ref.
2023	Emily Wurramara	Best Folk Act	Won	
2023	Emily Wurramara	Live Voice in Tasmania	Nominated	

=== Queensland Music Awards ===
The Queensland Music Awards (previously known as Q Song Awards) are annual awards celebrating Queensland, Australia's brightest emerging artists and established legends. They commenced in 2006.

Year	Nominee / work	Award	Result (wins only)
2017	"Ngayuwa Nalyelyingminama (I Love You)"	Indigenous Song of the Year	Won
2018	"Ngayuwa Nalyelyingminama (I Love You)"	Indigenous Song of the Year	Won
2019	"Lady Blue"	Indigenous Song of the Year	Won
2019	"Tap Sticks"	Blues and Roots Song of the Year	Won
