= Milyakburra (album) =

Studio album by Emily Wurramara
- Released: 1 June 2018
- Length: 44:02
- Label: Wanton Music

Emily Wurramara chronology
Black Smoke (2016)	Milyakburra (2018)	Ayarra Emeba (Calm Songs) (2022)

Milyakburra is the debut studio album by Indigenous Australian musician, Emily Wurramara. The album was released 1 June 2018.

The album is named after her grandparents' island of birth and tells personal stories through lyrics in both English and Anindilyakwa.

At the 2018 ARIA Music Awards, it was nominated for Best Blues and Roots Album. At the National Indigenous Music Awards 2018, it was nominated for Album of the Year.

At the AIR Awards of 2019, it won Best Independent Blues and Roots Album.

== Reception ==
Harry Webber from Life Without Andy said "Gliding between blissful indie-folk tracks and r&b groovers, Milyakburra is bound together by Wurramara's uplifting voice which resides somewhere between smooth and salty in a way that impresses upon the listener and sticks with you for days. Production wise, the record has pop leanings but the soulfulness of the tracks is a delightfully raw and emotive experience."

PBS said "This album charts a personal history as well as a continuing celebration of family, culture and the land."

== Track listing ==
No.	Title	Length
1.	"Lady Blue"	2:51
2.	"Milyakburra"	4:29
3.	"Ngarrikwujeyinama"	3:39
4.	"Carry Me Home"	4:51
5.	"Black Smoke"	4:38
6.	"Lullaby"	5:39
7.	"Hey Love"	3:36
8.	"Tap Sticks"	3:01
9.	"Yimenda-Papaguneray (Turtle Song)"	2:30
10.	"Blue Moon, Black Sea"	4:06
11.	"Black Boy"	4:39
