= Ziggy Ramo =

Australian singer

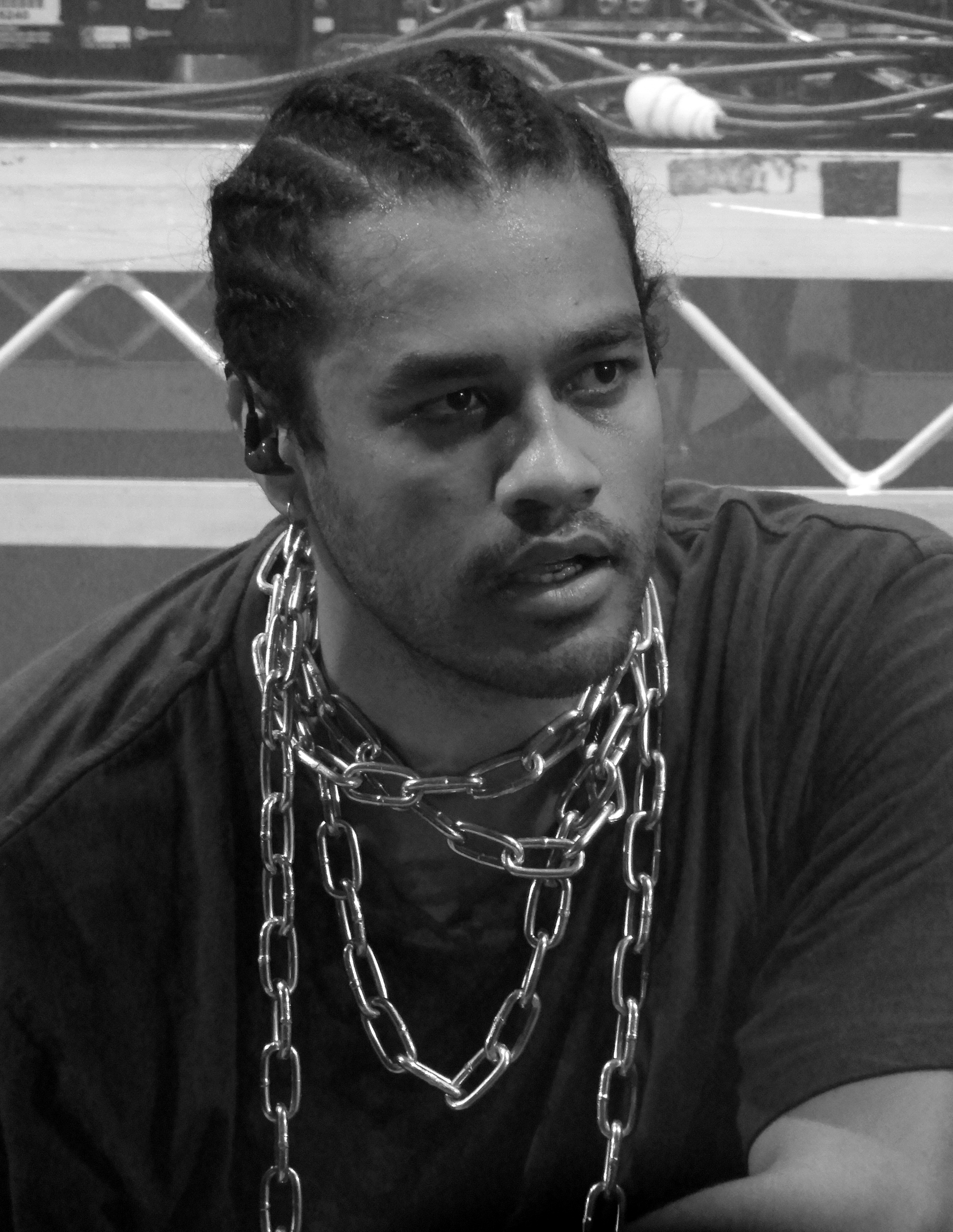
- Ziggy Ramo performs at Adelaide Festival 2021

Background information
- Born: Ziggy Ramo Burrmuruk Fatnowna; Bellingen, New South Wales, Australia
- Genres: Hip hop; Australian hip hop
- Occupations: Singer; songwriter; activist
- Years active: 2016–present

Ziggy Ramo Burrmuruk Fatnowna, known professionally as Ziggy Ramo, is an Australian singer.

== Early life ==
Ziggy Ramo Burrmuruk Fatnowna was born to an Aboriginal and Solomon Islander father and a mother of Scottish heritage in Bellingen, New South Wales and brought up across Arnhem Land and Perth, Western Australia.

Ramo moved to Perth when he was six years old and began pursuing music in his mid-teens, the social messaging of classic US hip-hop resonating with him. Black On Both Sides by Mos Def was one of his favourite albums growing up. Album Charcoal Lane by Indigenous musician Archie Roach was also an early inspiration.

After graduating from school, he embarked on a Pre-Medicine degree, determined to advocate for Indigenous health, before switching back to music, aiming to represent Indigenous Australian perspectives in rap.

== Career ==
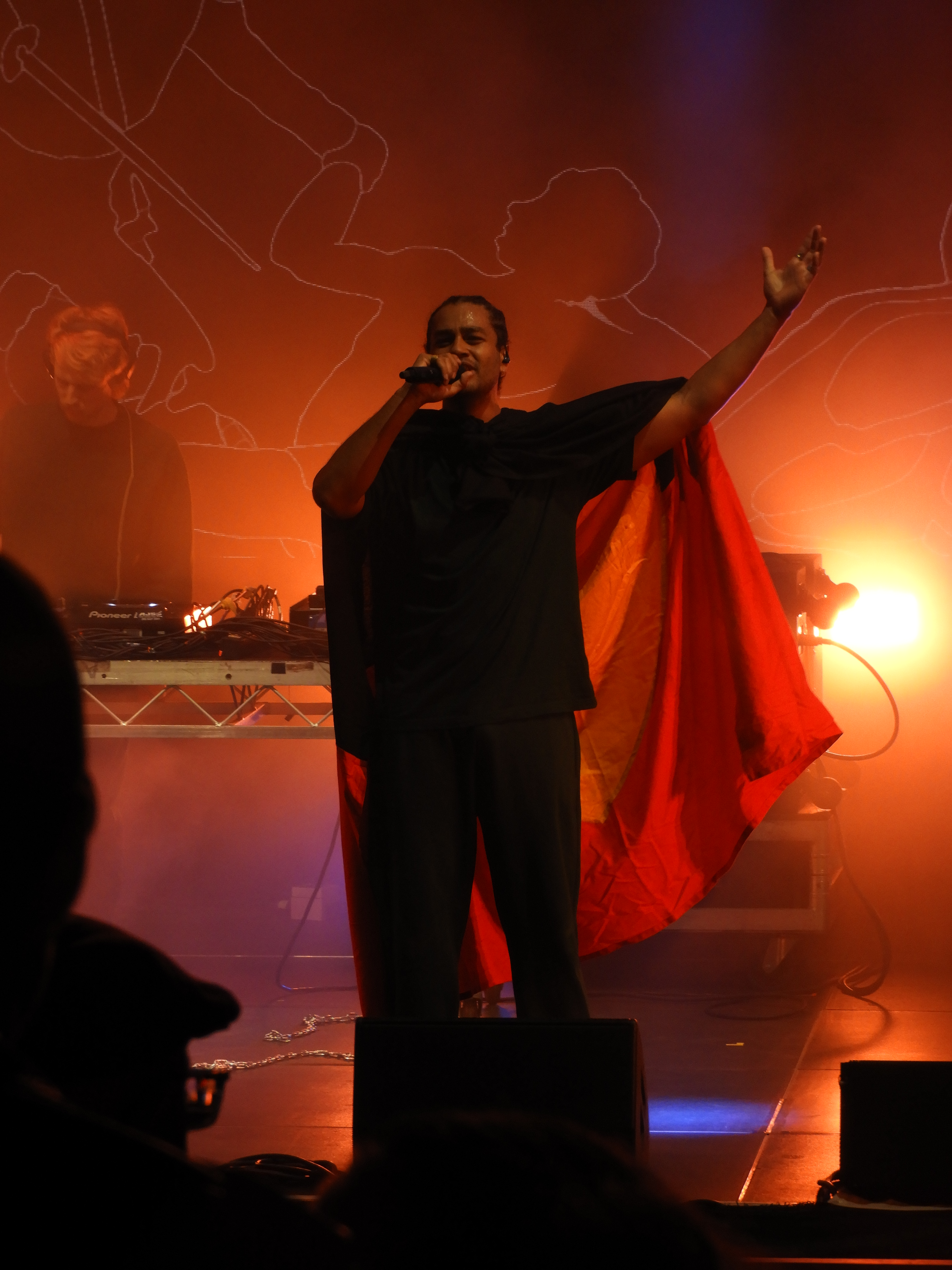
Ziggy Ramo wears a custom variation of the Aboriginal flag while performing at Adelaide Festival 2021

In 2015, Ramo completed his debut album Black Thoughts; an album that incisively addressed colonial dispossession, systemic racism and intergenerational trauma. Yet he worried that non-Indigenous Australia wasn't ready to engage with his truth-telling, so he shelved the album. Instead, in 2016, an EP of the same name was released.

The EP spawns the singles "Black Thoughts" and "Black Face".

Following the murder of George Floyd in Minneapolis on 25 May 2020, and the subsequent global Black Lives Matter protests against police brutality, Fatnowna decided to "rush release" the album saying "It was just still so relevant".

In August 2020, Ramo performed the album live at Sydney Opera House as part of its From Our House to Yours weekly program. In March 2021 Ramo was the headline artist at the Adelaide Festival's hip hop finale concert which featured an all-Indigenous line-up of artists. Other performers included Jimblah, JK-47 and J-Milla.

2021, saw Ramo release single "Little Things" adapted from Paul Kelly‘s 1993 single "From Little Things Big Things Grow". It charted at number 99 in the Triple J Hottest 100 of 2021.

Also, in 2021, Pantera Press acquired the rights to Ramo's debut non-fiction book, HUMAN.

In December 2022, Ramo released the single "Sugar Coated Lies" featuring Alice Skye from the series Black Snow, in which Ramo made his screen debut. On 26 January 2023, Ramo released his second studio album, Sugar Coated Lies.

Ramo collaborated with composer Jed Palmer to produce all of the music for the 2023 TV crime drama series created by Lucas Taylor, Black Snow, and also appears in it.

In January 2024, Ramo released "Banamba", the lead single from his forthcoming studio album, Human?.

== Influences ==
Ramo lists his musical influences including Lauryn Hill and Yasiin Bey and Aboriginal activists such as Charlie Perkins and Gary Foley.

== Discography ==
=== Studio albums ===
List of studio album released, with release date and label shown
Title	Album details
Black Thoughts	Released: 5 June 2020; Label: Ramo Records; Formats: Digital download, streaming
Sugar Coated Lies	Released: 26 January 2023; Label: Ramo Records; Formats: Digital download, streaming
Human?	Scheduled: 9 August 2024; Label: Ramo Records; Formats: Digital download, streaming

=== Extended plays ===
List of EPs released, with release date and label shown
Title	EP details
Black Thoughts	Released: 2016; Label: Ziggy; Formats: Digital download, streaming

=== Singles ===
List of singles and album name shown
Title	Year	Album
"Black Thoughts" (featuring Stan Grant)	2016	Black Thoughts (EP)
"Black Face"	2016	Black Thoughts (EP)
"Same Script"	2017	
"Ykwd (You Know We're Done)"	2017	
"A to Z"	2018	
"Empire"	2019	Black Thoughts
"Pretty Boy"	2019	
"Tjitji" (featuring Miiesha)	2020	Deadly Hearts: Walking Together
"Little Things" (featuring Paul Kelly)	2021	Human?
"Sugar Coated Lies" (featuring Alice Skye)	2022	Sugar Coated Lies
"Doo Wop (That Thing)" (Like a Version) (featuring Christine Anu)	2023	non-album single
"Banamba"	2024	Human?
"Shame"	2024	Human?
"Sorry"	2024	Human?
"Who We Are" (featuring Atticus and vonn)	2025	TBA
"See It Through"	2025	TBA
"Could Never Be Me"	2025	TBA

== Awards and nominations ==
=== AIR Awards ===
The Australian Independent Record Awards (commonly known informally as AIR Awards) is an annual awards night to recognise, promote and celebrate the success of Australia's Independent Music sector.

Year	Nominee / work	Award	Result	Ref.
2024	Sugar Coated Lies	Best Independent Hip Hop Album or EP	Nominated	
2025	Human?	Best Independent Hip Hop Album or EP	Nominated	

=== Australian Music Prize ===
The Australian Music Prize (the AMP) is an annual award of $30,000 given to an Australian band or solo artist in recognition of the merit of an album released during the year of award. They commenced in 2005.

Year	Nominee / work	Award	Result
2020	Black Thoughts	Album of the Year	Nominated

=== J Awards ===
The J Awards are an annual series of Australian music awards that were established by the Australian Broadcasting Corporation's youth-focused radio station Triple J. They commenced in 2005.

Year	Nominee / work	Award	Result	Ref.
2020	himself	You Done Good Award	Nominated	
2021	"Little Things" (with Paul Kelly)	Australian Video of the Year	Nominated	

=== National Indigenous Music Awards ===
The National Indigenous Music Awards (NIMA) recognise excellence, dedication, innovation and outstanding contribution to the Northern Territory music industry.

Year	Nominee / work	Award	Result
2018	"himself"	Best New Talent	Nominated

=== NSW Music Prize ===
The NSW Music Prize aims to "celebrate, support and incentivise" the NSW's most talented artists, with "the aim of inspiring the next generations of stars". It commenced in 2025.

Year	Nominee / work	Award	Result	Ref.
2025	Human?	NSW First Nations Music Prize	Nominated	

=== West Australian Music Industry Awards ===
The Western Australian Music Industry Awards (commonly known as WAMis) are annual awards presented to the local contemporary music industry, put on by the Western Australian Music Industry Association Inc (WAM).

Year	Nominee / work	Award	Result (wins only)
2017	Ziggy Ramo	Best Hip Hop Act	Won
2017	Ziggy Ramo	Best Indigenous Act	Won
