= Warrangu: River Story =

2024 album by Dobby

Studio album by Dobby
- Released: 14 June 2024
- Recorded: 2023
- Label: ABC Music

Dobby chronology
Dobby (2018)	Warrangu: River Story (2024)

Singles from Warrangu: River Story
- 1. "Dirrpi Yuin Patjulinya" Released: 1 December 2024; 2. "Ancestor" Released: 26 January 2024; 3. "Matter of Time" Released: 24 April 2024; 4. "Language is in the Land" Released: 14 June 2024

Warrangu: River Story is the debut studio album by Australian musician, Dobby. The album was announced on 1 December 2023 and released on 14 June 2024.

The album speaks to the cultural wisdom within by the three rivers surrounding the perimeters of Brewarrina — the Bogan, the Culgoa and the Barwon Rivers.

At the 2024 ARIA Music Awards, it won Best World Music Album.

The album was nominated for the 2024 Australian Music Prize. Upon hearing of the nomination, Dobby said "I'm incredibly honoured to be shortlisted for the Australian Music Prize. Warrangu tells the greater story of 'Australia', our land and our rivers. I thank every single person that has listened to this story, because, ultimately, you are part of it."

At the AIR Awards of 2025, the album was nominated for Best Independent Hip Hop Album or EP.

== Background ==
In 2017, Dobby received Create NSW's Peter Sculthorpe Fellowship and commenced researching and composing Warrangu: River Story, about the history and degradation of the three rivers around his ancestral home of Brewarrina, New South Wales. Dobby secured funding and contacted language and cultural consultant Brad Steadman, and together, walked along the Bogan River to receive the messages of land and waterways on Country.

Dobby recorded butcherbird on "Dirrpi Yuin Patjulinya" in 2018 in Brewarrina.

In January 2019, a mass fish die-off occurred in the Darling River at Menindee Lakes, where up to 1 million fish die. Following this incident, Dobby realised his album would not only be "a cultural honouring of the rivers", but had to "become a call to action". Dobby said on his website, "Water theft on a grand scale has been occurring in the region for years. In particular, over-irrigation and redirection of the waterways known as the Murray Darling Basin for the profit of almonds and cotton have caused horrific and irreversible damage to our ecosystem. In addition, last year up to a million fish died in Menindee NSW, rendering it the biggest fish kill in history, due to the high levels of Blue Green algae in the rivers. It is evident that the waters in our rivers have been mismanaged on a catastrophic level."

In June 2022, Dobby performed Warrangu at Art Gallery of NSW as part of Vivid Sydney.

The recording of the album occurred in 2023 and was announced on 1 December 2023.

In January 2025, Dobby is scheduled to perform Warrangu: River Story live at Sydney Festival with an ensemble.

== Singles ==
"Dirrpi Yuin Patjulinya" which translates to "The Bird Names Himself" from the Ngiyampaa language of Brewarrina, was released on 1 December 2023. The song alternates between English, Ngemba and Muruwari. A Micke Morphingaz directed video was released. Tom Disalvo from Happy Mag said "The single sheds light on the ongoing water theft occurring in the Brewarrina region of north-west New South Wales. To deliver his poignant message, Dobby incorporates natural diegetic sounds, including the distinct call of the native Australian Pied Butcherbird."

"Ancestor" was released on 26 January 2024. About the single, Dobby said "Ancestor is my musical reconnection with spirit(s).I look inward to find myself within my mind, body and cultural self, and I call upon the listener to do the same. Find yourself, and only then can you truly understand the Country you live on."

"Matter of Time" was released on 24 April 2024 as the album's third single. About the single, Dobby said "Through this song, I share an urgent truth: our environment and heritage hang in the balance, reminding us it's only a matter of time until we act or lose it all to climate disaster."

"Language is in the Land" was released on 14 June 2024 as the fourth single, alongside its video.

== Reception ==
Al Newstead from Double J said "The composer, producer, rapper and drummer has spent five years putting together Warrangu River Story, an ambitious project that tackles complex issues with an innovative approach." Newstead said "Warrangu River Story is an immersive hybrid of soundtrack-worthy music and audio documentary, and Australians could learn an awful lot from listening closely to what Dobby has to say."

Rita Andriani from Australian Broadcasting Corporation said "Warrangu portrays the interconnecting river stories through lyrics, musical motifs, the structure of the album and the voices of First Nations elders and knowledge holders. It is an intricate tapestry of old knowledge and what these communities stand to lose if we don't protect the health of the rivers."

Sian Cain from The Guardian said "The music is very enjoyable: there are pied butcherbird calls remixed over grand string sections, and piano interludes,... in which Indigenous elders speak about the rivers. Dobby's beautiful piano lingers underneath, almost like an echo. There are Murrawarri and Ngemba words sprinkled throughout the album; Murrawarri is considered extinct now, apart from some audio recordings, and Ngemba is critical endangered. But a hip-hop album is one way to immortalise them."

Bryget Chrisfield from Beat said "Dobby draws from a disparate sonic palette, incorporating jazz drumming, The Miseducation of Lauryn Hill-inspired piano interludes and hip-hop/sampled vocals alongside audio documentary. Over lush, orchestral arrangements, he drops truthbombs."

== Track listing ==
All tracks are written by Dobby.

No.	Title	Length
1.	"River" (with Brad Steadman)	4:09
2.	"Dirrpi Yuin Patjulinya"	3:50
3.	"Ngaandu" (with Aunty Josie Byno)	3:47
4.	"Water" (with Aunty Lily Shearer, Aunty Josie Byno, Brad Gordon, Bruce Shillingsworth and Rachel Evans)	2:17
5.	"Matter of Time" (with Lolita Emmanuel)	3:19
6.	"Bogari" (with Brad Steadman)	3:07
7.	"Ancestor" (with Lolita Emmanuel)	3:51
8.	"Rivers Run Dry" (with Kelsey Strasek-Barker and Uncle Tommy Barker)	3:04
9.	"Wahwangu" (with Brad Steadman, Aunty Lily Shearer, Uncle Tommy Barker, Brad Gordon, Aunty Josie Byno and Mary Berry-Shearer)	3:52
10.	"Language Is in the Land"	5:08
11.	"Story" (with Brad Steadman)	0:38

== Charts ==
Chart performance for Warrangu: River Story
Chart (2024)	Peak position
Australian Artist Hip Hop / R&B Albums (ARIA)	6
