= Marryuna =

Single by Baker Boy featuring Yirrmal
- Released: 6 October 2017
- Genre: Hip-hop
- Length: 3:14
- Label: Baker Boy (independent)
- Songwriters: Danzal Baker; Dion Brownfield; Jerome Farah; Tobiahs Fakhri; Yirrmal Marika
- Producer: Jerome Farah

Baker Boy singles chronology
"Cloud 9" (2017)	"Marryuna" (2017)	"Mr. La Di Da Di" (2018)

Music video
- "Marryuna" on YouTube

"Marryuna" (English: "Let's Dance") is a song by Indigenous Australian musician Baker Boy featuring Indigenous Australian singer Yirrmal, released independently as a single on 6 October 2017.

The song ranked at number 17 in Triple J's Hottest 100 of 2017.

At the 2018 AIR Awards, the song won Baker Boy Breakthrough Independent Artist, whilst "Marryuna" was nominated for Best Independent Single or EP.

At the 2018 Music Victoria Awards, "Marryuna" won Best Song.

At the 2018 National Indigenous Music Awards, the song was nominated for Best Song, while the video won Film Clip of the Year.

== Background ==
Upon release, Baker said: "'Marryuna' means to dance with no shame, to freestyle for the sheer elation of dancing."

== Reception ==
Molly McLaughlin, writing for Purple Sneakers, labelled "Marryuna" "a danceable party track that incorporates influences from previous generations of Indigenous artists alongside contemporary hip-hop. With a pulsing bass line and bouncy synths, the production is crowded and dynamic in the best way, matching Baker Boy's raucous energy. He can alternate between slow grooves and rapid-fire raps with ease, and carries the audience along with his aura of fearless confidence."

Apple Music noted that Baker Boy "seamlessly [slips] between English and his native Yolŋu Matha" and dubbed it a "brilliant, infectious, and incredibly welcome addition to modern Australian music."
