= Murder of Cassius Turvey =

2022 killing of child in Perth, Western Australia

- Date: 13 October 2022 / 23 October 2022
- Location: Middle Swan, Western Australia, Australia
- Motive: Anti-Indigenous racism
- Deaths: Cassius Turvey
- Accused: Jack Steven James Brearley; Aleesha Louise Gilmore; Mitchell Colin Forth; Brodie Lee Palmer
- Charges: Murder

Cassius Turvey was a 15-year-old boy who was assaulted on 13 October 2022 in Perth, Western Australia, and died ten days later of his injuries. His death sparked vigils and rallies across Australia and internationally. Four people were charged with his murder. After a 12-week trial, on 8 May 2025, two men were found guilty of murder, a third man was found guilty of manslaughter, and a woman who was with the men was acquitted.

== Background ==
Cassius Turvey was a 15-year-old Noongar-Yamatji child. His given name was from Cassius Clay, the birth name of boxer Muhammad Ali, because his family wanted him to be named after a strong black man. He was concerned with negative stereotypes of Aboriginal people, and was well-liked in his community.

Shortly before his death, Cassius had been training to work in community radio and had a job working at Kmart. He also ran a neighbourhood lawnmowing service and had been accepted for a work experience placement at a mining company. He enjoyed camping, playing guitar and yarning with older family members and members of the community.

His father had died of liver cancer on 22 August 2022, around a month before the attack on Cassius. Cassius lived with his mother, Mechelle Turvey, and had two older brothers.

== Death ==
On 13 October 2022, Turvey was attacked by an assailant armed with a metal pole while walking home from school with a group of friends in Middle Swan, a suburb of Perth. The group, which included his best friend, was approached by a group of men in a utility vehicle who verbally harassed them. One of the men exited the vehicle and chased after the boys, catching Turvey and beating him with a metal pole. Turvey was taken to the hospital and treated for injuries. One of his friends, who was on crutches from a previous injury, was also attacked, with his crutches being stolen. He escaped with facial bruising.

Turvey was taken to St John of God Midland Hospital with lacerations on his head. A subsequent CT scan and MRI uncovered two brain bleeds, which resulted in him being transferred to Perth Children's Hospital, where he stayed for five days before being sent home. Eight hours after being discharged, he suffered a seizure and returned to hospital, where he underwent emergency brain surgery and was placed in an induced coma Five days later, on 23 October, ten days after the attack, he died of his injuries.

== Aftermath ==
Turvey's family said on 24 October that it could be a case of mistaken identity, and that he was targeted by the assailant thinking he was someone else.

His death sparked candlelit vigils and rallies across Australia on the evening of 2 November, as well as in New Zealand and Los Angeles. Turvey's mother, Mechelle Turvey, appealed for calm at the rallies, saying that she wanted no violence in her son's name, and that she was the only person who could get justice for her son. An ongoing vigil was set up at a tree near the site of the attack, dubbed "Cassius' tree".

A GoFundMe fundraising drive was created for Mechelle, whose husband (and Cassius' father) had died one month before Cassius, due to cancer. By 18 November 2022, over A$700,000 had been raised. Mechelle said that the funds would be used to set up a community service to help vulnerable and disadvantaged children.

Western Australia Police and premier Mark McGowan discouraged public speculation about the reasons for the attack. Australian prime minister Anthony Albanese described it as an attack that was "clearly racially motivated", a claim rejected by prosecutors and some of the defendants during the trial.

Human rights lawyer Hannah McGlade, a member of the UN Permanent Forum on Indigenous Issues, said that the death reminded the community of other deaths of Aboriginal teenagers, including Elijah Doughty and Thomas "TJ" Hickey.

Turvey's funeral was held on Friday 18 November 2022. Hundreds of people attended, and it was live-streamed across the country.

=== Recognition and honours ===
First Nations artists including Emma Donovan, Emily Wurramara, Drmngnow, Dobby, and Optamus united to create a song in memory of Turvey, titled "Forever 15". It was played at his funeral and released three days later on 21 November 2022.

A memorial plaque was installed at Weeip Park, in Midland, in October 2023.

In November 2023, Mechelle Turvey was named the 2024 Australian of the Year for Western Australia, "for her advocacy work to prevent violence and improve the treatment of victims of crime". She had called on the community to remain calm and let justice take its course, and also helped to develop a training program for police recruits about how to deal with victims of crime in a sensitive manner, especially Aboriginal people who had had traumatic experiences growing up. She was nominated for the award by Detective Sergeant Steve Cleal, who was one of the investigating officers into the death of her son.

On 8 June 2026, Mechelle Turvey was awarded a Medal of the Order of Australia in the King's Birthday Honours, "for her service to Indigenous communities in Western Australia", where she continues to work for Western Australia Police.

== Legal proceedings ==
Police arrested and charged Jack Steven James Brearley, a 21-year-old man, with one count of unlawful wounding. After Turvey's death police also charged him with murder. Brearley was also charged with unlawful assault causing bodily harm in circumstances of aggravation and stealing, after allegedly attacking Turvey's 13-year-old friend with a metal pole and stealing his walking crutches and cap. In January 2023, police also charged three more people with Turvey's murder: Aleesha Louise Gilmore, 20, Mitchell Colin Forth, 24, and Brodie Lee Palmer, 27.

The trial of the four accused people began in February 2025 in the Supreme Court. (Note: The trial also covered other offences leading up to, but separate to, Turvey's murder. A fifth defendant, Ethan MacKenzie, was tried and convicted of abduction and assault of two other teenagers, but no offences related to Turvey.) On 8 May 2025, Brearley and Palmer were found guilty of murder, while Forth was found guilty of manslaughter, and Gilmore was acquitted. Mechelle Turvey thanked the 91 witnesses, and said that she felt lighter once the trial had concluded.

On 27 June 2025, sentencing was handed down. Brearley was sentenced to life imprisonment with a non-parole period of 22 years, making him eligible for parole in October 2044. Palmer was also sentenced to life imprisonment with a non-parole period of 18 years, making him eligible for parole in January 2041. Forth was convicted of manslaughter and received 12 years in prison with a non-parole period of 10 years. Gilmore was acquitted of Turvey's murder but was convicted of abducting and assaulting other teenagers in the days before Turvey was hunted. Gilmore received a suspended 15-month prison sentence, suspended for two years, with strict community conditions including supervision and a curfew.

During sentencing, Chief Justice Peter Quinlan said: "Cassius Turvey was robbed of his life and of his promise ... all because you killed him, Mr Brearley."
