= Tasman Keith =

Australian rapper

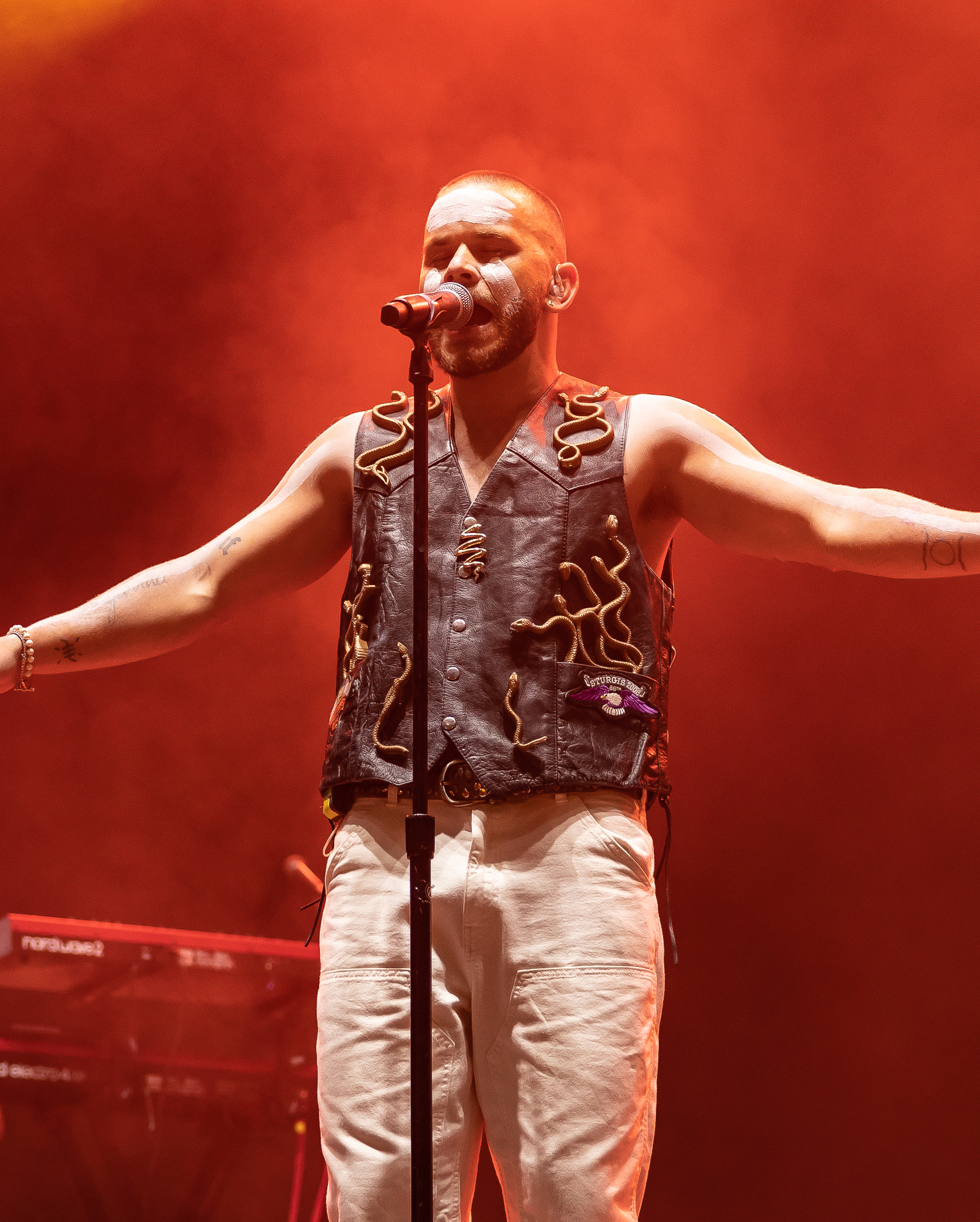
- Performing at Laneway Festival in Sydney on 5 February 2023

Background information
- Born: Tasman Keith Jarrett; 1996 (age 29–30); Macksville
- Origin: Australia
- Occupations: Rapper; singer; songwriter
- Instrument: Vocals
- Years active: 2016–present
- Website: www.tasmankeith.com

Tasman Keith is an Australian rapper and singer-songwriter.

== Early life ==
Tasman Keith is a Gumbaynggirr man from Bowraville, New South Wales.

At age seven Tasman and his family moved from Bowraville to Sydney for his father's music. His dad was a rapper called Wire MC. Tasman says he was on stage at eight years old at festivals. At age 14 his family decided to move back to Bowraville.

== Career ==
=== 2016–2020: Career beginnings and early EPs ===
In 2016, Keith uploaded his music onto Triple J Unearthed. and in 2017 released his debut studio single "Might Snap" which received rotation across several community radio platforms including FBi Radio and received critical acclaim on Triple J Unearthed. Shortly after, Keith teamed up with producer James Mangohig and Bad Apples Music's Nooky to begin the process of compiling his debut studio EP.

In 2018 his debut EP, Mission Famous which was recorded at Skinnyfish Music's Studio G and produced by Mangohig and Nooky. The EP made Triple J's Al Newstead's list of Best New Music for the week of 29 October 2018, calling the title track "the highlight". In 2018, Keith also commenced studies in music and sound design at the University of Technology Sydney.

In 2019 he collaborated with Stevie Jean and recorded the EP Evenings. In November he released "Billy Bad Again", a song he says came from a "semi-frustrating studio session" with my producers, Kapital J & James Mangohig saying "I was too focused on forcing out as many songs as I could. James had me step outside for a minute, when I came back in Kapital J had this beat that he said was perfect for the vibe we were in. It was this aggressive yet braggadocious instrumental that reminded me to have fun with it and talk my shit. 'Billy Bad Again' is the side of me that is confident and unapologetic, it's about being that guy wherever you are and for me it's my turn to show that through my music, whilst throwing in two Adam Sandler movie references." At the J Awards of 2020, the video won Australian Video of the year.

In December 2020, he released the EP To Whom It May Concern.

=== 2021–present: A Colour Undone ===
In February 2022, Keith announced the forthcoming release of his debut studio album, A Colour Undone alongside its second single "Love Too Soon". A Colour Undone debuted at number 718 on the ARIA Charts.

== Discography ==
=== Studio albums ===
List of albums released, with release date and label shown
Title	Details
A Colour Undone	Released: * 8 July 2022; Label: AWAL; Formats: Digital download, streaming, LP (April 2024)

=== Extended plays ===
List of EPs released, with release date and label shown
Title	EP details
Mission Famous	Released: 26 October 2018; Label: Mission Famous Music; Formats: Digital download, streaming
Evenings (with Stevie Jean)	Released: 30 August 2019; Label: Settle Down Records; Formats: Digital download, streaming
To Whom it May Concern	Released: 11 December 2020; Label: Tasman Keith; Formats: Digital download, streaming

=== Singles ===
==== As lead artist ====
List of singles, with year released and album name shown
Title	Year	Album
"Midnight Snap"	2017	Non-album single
"My Pelopolees"	2018	Mission Famous
"Divided"	2018	Mission Famous
"The Rope"	2018	Mission Famous
"Move Up"	2019	Non-album single
"Prey" (with Stevie Jean)	2019	Evenings
"Billy Bad Again"	2019	Non-album singles
"Nightmare on the 9th"	2020	Non-album singles
"64 Bars"	2020	Non-album singles
"No Country (Piano in F Minor)" (with Kuya James)	2020	Non-album singles
"Confident"	2020	To Whom It May Concern
"One" (with Kwame)	2021	Non-album single
"5FT Freestyle"	2022	A Colour Undone
"Love Too Soon"	2022	A Colour Undone
"Cheque" (featuring Genesis Owusu)	2022	A Colour Undone
"IDK" (featuring Phil Fresh)	2022	A Colour Undone
"Heaven With U" (featuring Jessica Mauboy	2022	A Colour Undone
"Tread Light"	2022	A Colour Undone
"New Look" (with Adrian Dzvuke)	2023	TBA
"Price Up!" (with Mali Jo$e and xmunashe)	2023	TBA
"Left Right"	2023	TBA
"Too Many Reds" (with Will Grilla)	2023	TBA
"Lordy Lord" (with Emily Wurramara)	2024	Nara
"Territorial"	2024	
"B.O.B. (Bombs Over Baghdad)" (Triple J, Like a Version)	2025	

==== As featured artist ====
List of singles, with year released and album name shown
Title	Year	Album
"Assimilate" (Omar Musa featuring Tasman Keith)	2017	Since Ali Died
"Smoking Ceremony" (Skinnyfish Sound System featuring B2M, Birdz and Tasman Keith)	2019	Non-album single
"First Nation" (Midnight Oil featuring Jessica Mauboy and Tasman Keith)	2020	The Makarrata Project
"Solid Rock" (Goanna featuring Moss, Tasman Keith and William Barton)	2023	Non-album single
"This Time" (Holy Holy featuring Tasman Keith)	2023	Cellophane
"Avalanche" (JK-47 featuring Tasman Keith)	2023	TBA

== Awards and nominations ==
=== AIR Awards ===
The Australian Independent Record Awards (known informally as the AIR Awards) is an annual awards night to recognise, promote and celebrate the success of Australia's Independent Music sector.

Year	Nominee / work	Award	Result	Ref.
2019	Mission Famous	Best Independent Hip Hop Album or EP	Nominated	
2020	Evenings (with Stevie Jean)	Best Independent Hip Hop Album or EP	Nominated	
2025	Claudia Sangiorgi Dalimore for "Lordy Lordy" (Emily Wurramara featuring Tasman Keith)	Independent Music Video of the Year	Nominated	

=== APRA Awards ===
The APRA Awards are held in Australia and New Zealand by the Australasian Performing Right Association to recognise songwriting skills, sales and airplay performance by its members annually

Year	Nominee / work	Award	Result	Ref.
2022	"First Nation" (Midnight Oil featuring Jessica Mauboy and Tasman Keith)	Song of the Year	Nominated	

=== ARIA Music Awards ===
The ARIA Music Awards is an annual awards ceremony that recognises excellence, innovation, and achievement across all genres of the music of Australia.

Year	Nominee / work	Award	Result	Ref.
2022	Seshanka Samarajiwa, Zain Ayub & Tasman Keith for Tasman Keith – A Colour Undone	Best Cover Art	Nominated	

=== Australian Music Prize ===
The Australian Music Prize (the AMP) is an annual award of $30,000 given to an Australian band or solo artist in recognition of the merit of an album released during the year of award. It exists to discover, reward and promote new Australian music of excellence.

Year	Nominee / work	Award	Result	Ref.
2022	A Colour Undone	Australian Music Prize	Nominated	

=== J Awards ===
The J Awards are an annual series of Australian music awards that were established by the Australian Broadcasting Corporation's youth-focused radio station Triple J. They commenced in 2005.

Year	Nominee / work	Award	Result	Ref.
2020	"Billy Bad Again" (directed by Joey Hunter)	Australian Video of the Year	Won	
2024	"Lordy Lordy" (Emily Wurramara featuring Tasman Keith); Directed by Claudia Sangiorgi Dalimore	Australian Video of the Year	Won	

=== National Indigenous Music Awards ===
The National Indigenous Music Awards (NIMA) recognise excellence, dedication, innovation and outstanding contribution to the Northern Territory music industry.

Year	Nominee / work	Award	Result	Ref.
2019	himself	New Talent of the Year	Nominated	
2019	"Prey" (with Stevie Jean)	Song of the Year	Nominated	
2019	"Prey" (with Stevie Jean)	Film Clip of the Year	Nominated	
2020	"Billy Bad Again"	Film Clip of the Year	Nominated	
2022	"Love Too Soon"	Film Clip of the Year	Nominated	
2025	"Lordy Lordy" (Emily Wurramara featuring Tasman Keith)	Film Clip of the Year	Won	
