= Alice Skye =

Australian singer–songwriter

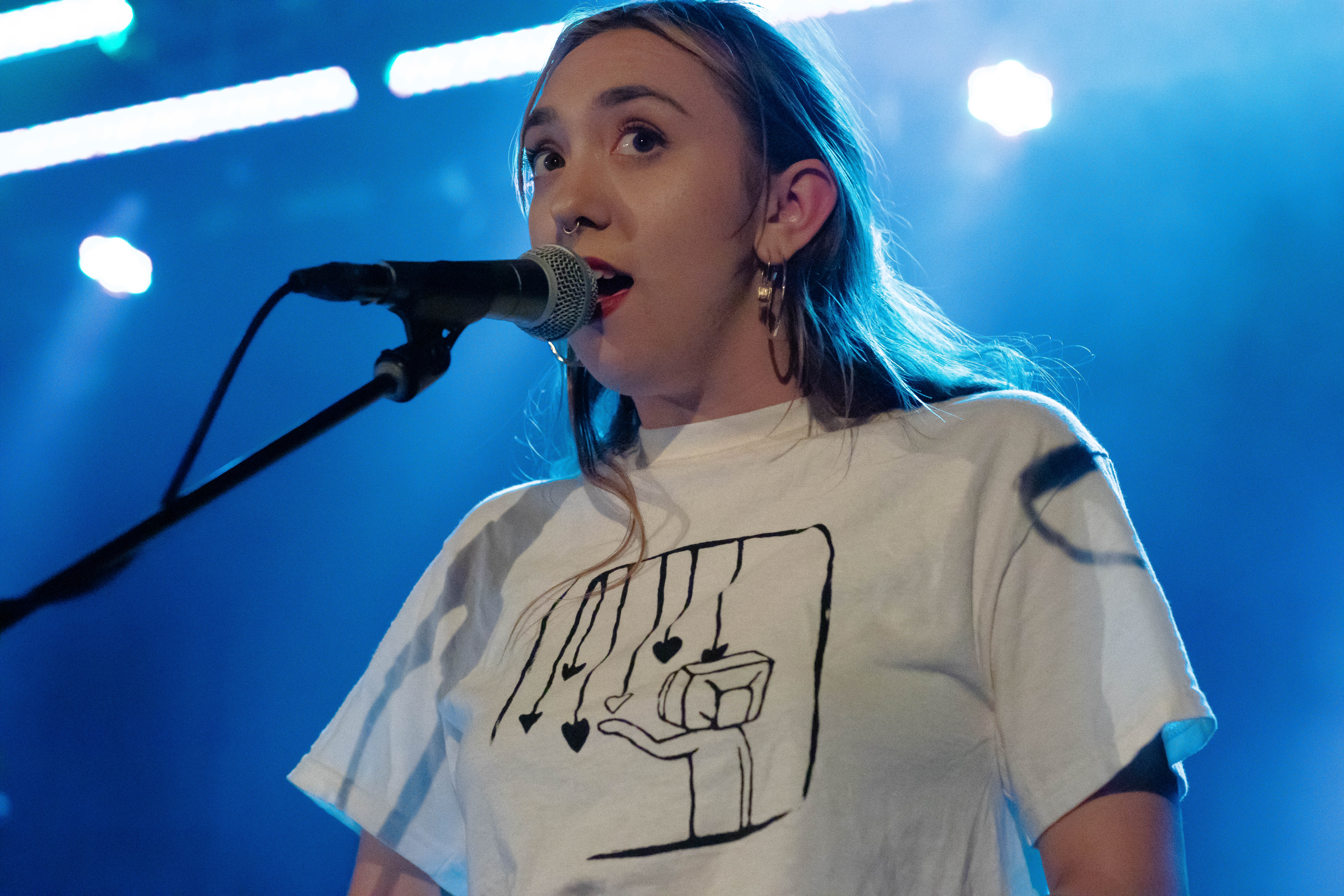
- Skye in 2018

Background information
- Born: Alice Anderson
- Origin: Australia
- Occupation: Singer-songwriter

Alice Skye (born Alice Anderson) is an Australian singer and songwriter. She is a British and Wergaia/Wemba Wemba woman from Horsham.

== Career ==
In 2017, Skye was the Triple J Unearthed National Indigenous Winner. She released her debut album, Friends with Feelings, in 2018.

In 2020, Skye released single 'Grand Ideas' from album I Feel Better But I Don't Feel Good. Lyrically, the single is about feeling overwhelmed and was written on the way home from seeing a new therapist.

In 2022, she featured on the Ziggy Ramo song 'Sugar Coated Lies' which appeared in Season 1 Episode 6 of the Stan original series, Black Snow.

She has toured with Emily Wurramara and Midnight Oil, and she has opened for The Avalanches.

Skye writes most of her songs on the piano. She also plays guitar.

Skye and her sister, author and poet Susie Anderson, contributed to the book Growing Up Aboriginal in Australia, published in 2018 and edited by Anita Heiss.

== Discography ==
=== Studio albums ===
List of studio albums, with release date and label shown
| Title | Album detail(s) |
|---|---|
| Friends with Feelings | Released: 6 April 2018; Label: Alice Skye Anderson (independent), CAAMA; Formats: CD, digital download, streaming |
| I Feel Better but I Don't Feel Good | Released: 23 July 2021; Label: Bad Apples; Formats: CD, digital download, streaming |

=== Singles ===
List of singles, with year released and album name shown
| Title | Year | Album |
|---|---|---|
| "You Are the Mountain" | 2015 | Non-album single |
| "60%" | 2017 | Friends with Feelings |
| "Poetry By Text" | 2017 | Friends with Feelings |
| "Friends with Feelings" | 2018 | Friends with Feelings |
| "I Feel Better but I Don't Feel Good" | 2019 | I Feel Better but I Don't Feel Good |
| "Grand Ideas" | 2020 | I Feel Better but I Don't Feel Good |
| "Stay in Bed" | 2020 | I Feel Better but I Don't Feel Good |
| "Party Tricks" | 2021 | I Feel Better but I Don't Feel Good |
| "Everything Is Great" | 2021 | I Feel Better but I Don't Feel Good |
| "Sugar Coated Lies" (with Ziggy Ramo) | 2022 | TBA |

=== Guest appearances ===
| Title | Year | Album |
|---|---|---|
| "Speak Your Language" | 2019 | Deadly Hearts 2 |
| "Terror Australia" (Midnight Oil featuring Alice Skye) | 2020 | The Makarrata Project |
| "The Great Escape" (Moby with Nataly Dawn, Alice Skye and Luna Li) | 2021 | Reprise |

== Awards and nominations ==
=== Australian Women in Music Awards ===
The Australian Women in Music Awards is an annual event that celebrates outstanding women in the Australian Music Industry who have made significant and lasting contributions in their chosen field. They commenced in 2018.

| Year | Nominee / work | Award | Result | Ref. |
|---|---|---|---|---|
| 2019 | Herself | Emerging Artist Award | Won | |

=== Music Victoria Awards ===
The Music Victoria Awards, are an annual awards night celebrating Victorian music. They commenced in 2005.

| Year | Nominee / work | Award | Result | Ref. |
|---|---|---|---|---|
| 2020 | Herself | Best Breakthrough Act | Nominated | |
| 2020 | Herself | The Archie Roach Foundation Award for Emerging Talent | Nominated | |
| 2021 | "Party Tricks" | Best Victorian Song | Nominated | |
| 2021 | Herself | Best Pop Act | Won | |
| 2022 | Alice Skye | Best Regional Act | Nominated | |

=== National Indigenous Music Awards ===
The National Indigenous Music Awards recognise excellence, innovation and leadership among Aboriginal and Torres Strait Islander musicians from throughout Australia.

| Year | Nominee / work | Award | Result | Ref. |
|---|---|---|---|---|
| 2020 | "I Feel Better but I Don't Feel Good" | Song of the Year | Nominated | |
