= Emma Donovan =

Australian singer-songwriter (born 1981)

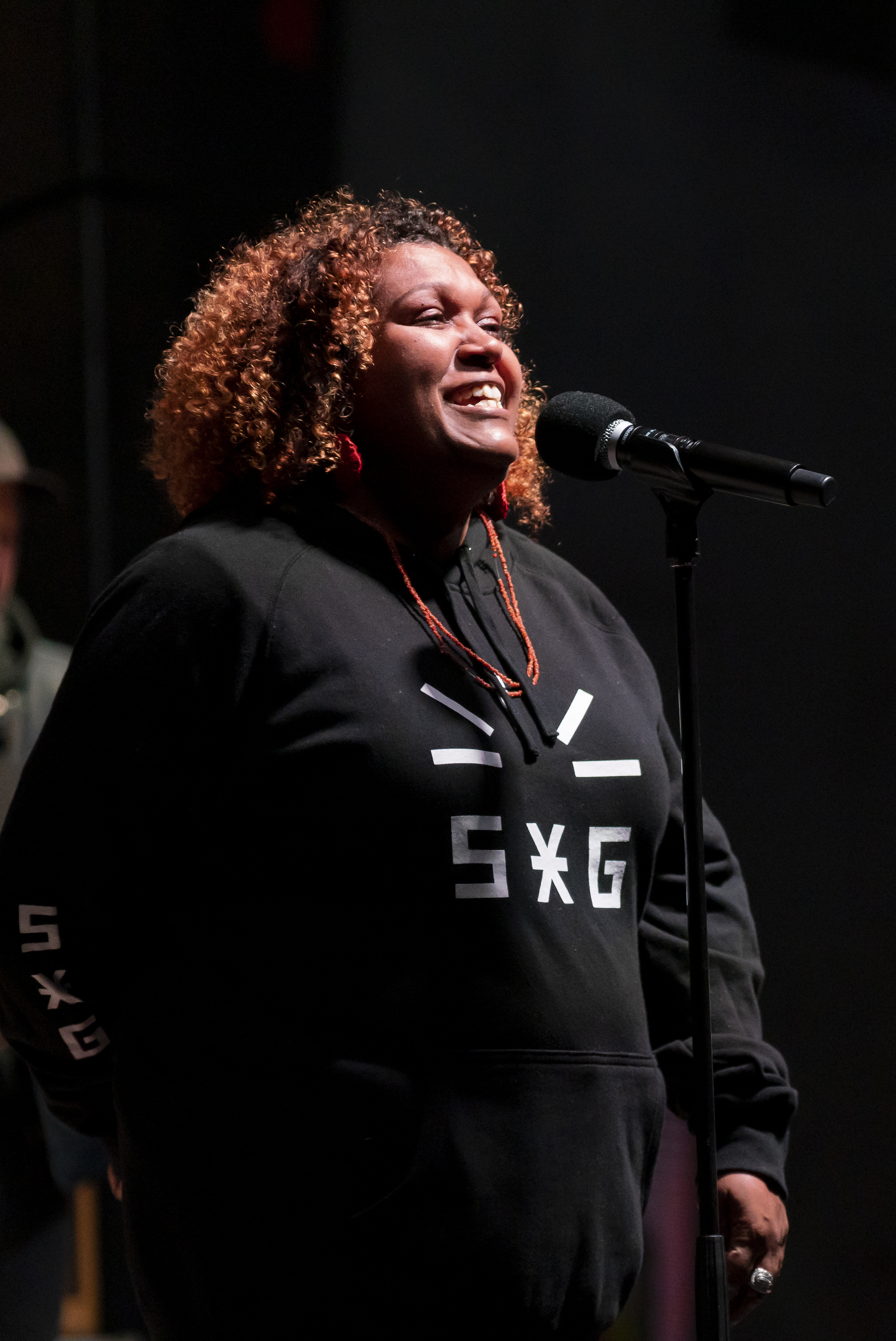

Background information
- Born: 1981 (age 44–45); Liverpool, New South Wales, Australia
- Genres: R&B; soul; country; reggae
- Occupation: Singer-songwriter
- Years active: 2000–present
- Labels: HopeStreet; Cooking Vinyl Australia
- Member of: The Black Arm Band
- Formerly of: The Donovans; Stiff Gins
- Website: emmadonovan.com

Emma Donovan (born 1981) is an Aboriginal Australian singer and songwriter. She is a member of the musical Donovan family. She started her singing career at age seven with her uncle's band, the Donovans. In 2000, she became a founding member of Stiff Gins, leaving the band three years later to release the solo album Changes, in 2004. She performs with the Black Arm Band and released a solo EP, Ngaaraanga, in 2009.

Donovan has been nominated for multiple Deadly Awards, including Female Artist of the Year, and performed at the opening of the 2004 Olympic Torch Relay. She won Best Female Artist at the 2009 BUMP Awards. Donovan appeared in the ABC series Dynasties in 2004 and was the subject of the 2005 SBS TV documentary Emma Donovan: Gumbainggir Lady.

Donovan has performed with Indigenous Australian musicians such as Frank Yamma, her cousin Casey Donovan, Archie Roach and Ruby Hunter, Christine Anu, Tiddas, Yothu Yindi, and Jimmy Little. She has also performed with Paul Kelly, Ursula Yovich, and Shellie Morris.

== Early life and education ==
Heritage

Donovan was born in 1981 in Liverpool, a suburb of Sydney. Her father, Neville Councillor, is from Geraldton in Western Australia, and is of Naaguja and Bibbulman heritage. Her mother, Agnes Donovan, is a Gumbaynggirr and Dunghutti woman from the Nambucca Valley on the north coast of New South Wales, where Emma was raised.

Music

Donovan's musical singing career started at a young age. Her grandparents Micko and Aileen Donovan, years before her birth, founded the Aboriginal country band The Donovans, which consisted of their five sons and daughter Agnes singing at local events. Donovan's uncles still perform as the Donovan Brothers band. At the age of seven, she began periodically singing with the Donovans. Her family and mother Agnes encouraged and supported her singing, Agnes taking her to talent competitions around the country. Agnes also helped develop Aboriginal showcases at the Tamworth Country Music Festival in the late 1990s, in which Donovan took part.

Education

Donovan's family moved frequently, and she attended multiple schools in New South Wales and WA, with an extended time spent at North Newtown Primary. In 1997, at age sixteen, Donovan was studying contemporary music at the Eora College for Performing Arts in Chippendale, New South Wales. The school was founded to provide education for Indigenous students. She began branching out from country music, exploring reggae and R&B as well.

== Musical career ==
=== 1999–2003: Stiff Gins ===
In late 1999, Donovan formed the vocal acoustic band Stiff Gins with Nardi Simpson and Kaleena Briggs after meeting at the Eora College. They released their first EP, Soh Fa, on Sony Records in 2000. Donovan co-wrote their second release, the full album Origins. The group won two Deadly Awards; 2000 for Most Promising New Talent and in 2001 for Best Single Release for "Morning Star". After touring both nationally and internationally, Donovan left the group in 2003 to work on solo material with industry professionals.

=== 2004–2006: Changes ===
In 2004, she was the subject of SBS documentary Gumbaynggirr Lady and opened the 2004 Summer Olympics torch relay. Later that year, she toured in Greece for the Indigenous Australia Now exhibition prior to the 2004 Olympics. That year she also performed at the 10th Festival of Pacific Arts in Palau.

In 2004, Donovan released her debut solo album Changes. The Sydney launch of the album was well received. The style was a blend of soul, gospel, and reggae, with country undertones. In 2005, Donovan embarked on an Australian tour to promote the album. In 2007, Wendy Martin of the Sydney Opera House stated: "Emma is one of the most requested artists on Koori Radio 93.7FM since the release of her CD Changes, and is fast becoming one of the most popular live performers in Sydney."

In 2006 she performed at the Perth Festival of the Arts, the Australian Performing Arts market in Adelaide, the Waitangi Day Ceremony in New Zealand, and The Dreaming Festival in Queensland. She also made a short tour to Paris. In 2006, Donovan recorded three songs with longtime writing partner Yanya Boston, a drummer she had met while performing with the Stiff Gins. She also worked with Rob Wolf and Adam Ventoura. Among the songs were "Lonely" and "He's Just A Kid." At the time she was a participant in the Music NSW industry program Which Way.

=== 2007–2012: The Black Arm Band and Ngarraanga ===
In 2007, she performed at the WOMADELAIDE festival, various festivals in Melbourne, and the Sydney Opera House with the Melbourne Symphony Orchestra.

In 2007, Donovan was invited to become a member of the Black Arm Band. The travelling group performed a stage musical called Murundak/Alive – The Black Arm Band, which reproduced iconic songs of the Aboriginal resistance movement. The show toured England and Canada to great acclaim. The cast consists of a rotating line-up of Australian Indigenous musicians, and in 2007 murundak won the Helpmann Award for Best Contemporary Music Concert.

While working on Murundaki, Donovan was working on material with drummer Yanya Boston. The pair co-wrote the single "Ngarranga – Remember", intended as a prayer to acknowledge the Stolen Generations experience. It was initially released on the Kimberly Stolen Generation Corporation's 2007 compilation CD Cry Stolen.

By April 2008, Donovan was working with industry veteran Vicki Gordon of VGM Media and Marketing. Together they created a gospel remix of the single "Ngarranga – Remember," along with four other songs to create a five track EP. The EP, Ngarraanga (Remember), or Ngarraanga Ngiinundi Yuludarra (Remember Your Dreaming), is intended as a tribute to the Stolen Generations. The songs include Donovan's traditional language, as well as spoken words from her Uncle Harry Buchanan and backing vocals from Gary Pinto and Juanita Tippins. The EP was released by MGM on National Sorry Day on 26 May 2009. A music video to accompany the "Ngarranga" single was filmed at Carriageworks performance space in Redfern, New South Wales, starring Donovan and Torres Strait Islander dancer Albert David. It is interwoven with archival footage.

In October 2009, at the Melbourne International Arts Festival, Donovan performed in the world premiere of the musical theatre production of Dirtsong, created by Black Arm Band. The songs were written by Alexis Wright, with some sung in Indigenous languages. The show was reprised as the closing show at the 2014 Adelaide Festival. Other performers included Trevor Jamieson (2014 only), Archie Roach, Lou Bennett, and Paul Dempsey.

Donovan performed at the 2010 Winter Olympics in Vancouver, Canada.

=== 2013–2021: Emma Donovan & the PutBacks ===
In 2013, Donovan started performing with The Putbacks, a funk / soul band based in Melbourne, as Emma Donovan & The PutBacks. They have toured together and recorded several songs and albums. Their debut album Dawn was released November 2014, Crossover in November 2020, and Under these Streets in September 2021.

=== 2022–present ===
In January 2022, Donovan released a cover of Archie Roach's "Get back to the Land" with The Teskey Brothers.

In November 2022, she collaborated with other First Nations artists DOBBY, Emily Wurramara, Drmngnow, and Optamus to create a song in memory of Cassius Turvey, a Noongar-Yamatji boy who had died at the age of 15 the result of an assault by a random attacker when walking home from school in Perth, Western Australia. The song, titled "Forever 15", was played at Turvey's funeral on 18 November 2022 funeral and released three days later on 21 November 2022.

In July 2023, Donovan released "Take No More" with Kee'Ahn.

In February 2024, Donovan announced the release of her fifth studio album, Til My Song is Done, scheduled for release on 19 April 2024.

In May 2026, Donovan released a covers album titled, Take Me to the River.

== Musical style ==
Donovan's singing and songwriting frequently blend reggae, gospel, smooth soul, roots, and country music. Her work with the soul / funk-influenced Putbacks has been likened to Aretha Franklin's Atlantic - era recordings, however, her record label highlights the influence of Australian Indigenous music, and claim her song-writing is "more akin to classic Aboriginal bands like Coloured Stone than it is to Sharon Jones".

Although she has stated she is proud of her Naaguja, Yamatji, and Danggali tribal heritage, she most frequently expresses her Gumbaynggirr heritage from her mother's side in her music, often singing in the traditional language.

== Documentaries ==
Donovan has appeared in or been featured in a handful of documentaries. The documentary Gumbayngirr Lady featured her, and was filmed and aired by the Special Broadcasting Service in 2004 as part of their BLAKTRAX series. The hour-long film followed Donovan to her home region of Macksville, New South Wales. In 2005 she appeared in the ABC series Dynasties (episode 5), which was filmed on location in Woodford, Queensland while she was performing at the Dreaming Festival.

- Emma Donovan: Gumbainggir Lady (SBS TV) (2004)
- Dynasties (ABC series) (2005)
- murundak – songs of freedom (AFI) (2011)

== Discography ==
=== Albums ===
Title	Album details
Changes	Released: 2004; Format: CD; Note: The album was sponsored by the Australia Council for the Arts
Dawn (by Emma Donovan & The PutBacks)	Released: 7 November 2014; Format: CD, DD, LP; Label: Hope Street Recordings (HS015)
Crossover (by Emma Donovan & The PutBacks)	Released: 6 November 2020; Format: CD, DD, LP, streaming; Label: Hope Street Recordings
Under These Streets (by Emma Donovan & The PutBacks)	Released: 17 September 2021; Format: CD, DD, LP, streaming; Label: Heavy Machinery Records/Cooking Vinyl Australia
Til My Song Is Done	Scheduled: 19 April 2024; Format: CD, LP, streaming; Label: Cooking Vinyl Australia
Take Me to the River	Scheduled: 8 May 2026; Format: Streaming; Label: Emma Donovan, Civilians

=== EPs ===
Title	Album details
Ngarraanga	Released: 26 May 2009; Format: CD, DD; Label: VGM (VGM12009)
Follow the Sun	Released: 21 February 2022; Format: DD, streaming; Label: ABC

== Awards and nominations ==
=== AIR Awards ===
The Australian Independent Record Awards (commonly known informally as AIR Awards) is an annual awards night to recognise, promote and celebrate the success of Australia's Independent Music sector.

Year	Nominee / work	Award	Result	Ref.
2021	Crossover	Independent Album of the Year	Nominated	
2021	Crossover	Best Independent Soul/R&B Album or EP	Won	
2022	Under These Streets (with the Putbacks)	Best Independent Soul/R&B Album or EP	Won	
2024	"Blak Nation" (directed by Chris Cowburn)	Independent Music Video of the Year	Nominated	
2025	Til My Song Is Done	Best Independent Blues and Roots Album or EP	Won	
2025	Rohan Sforcina and Lachlan Carrick for Emma Donovan Til My Song Is Done	Independent Mix, Studio or Mastering Engineer of the Year	Nominated	

=== APRA Awards ===
The APRA Awards are presented annually from 1982 by the Australasian Performing Right Association (APRA), "honouring composers and songwriters". They commenced in 1982.

Year	Nominee / work	Award	Result	Ref.
2026	"Thick Skin" (Baker Boy featuring Thelma Plum, Emma Donovan, Kee'ahn & Jada Weazel) (Danzal Baker, Rob Amoruso, Kee'ahn Bindol, Emma Donovan, Thelma Plum, Pip Norman, Jada Weazel)	Song of the Year	Shortlisted	

=== ARIA Music Awards ===
The ARIA Music Awards is an annual ceremony presented by Australian Recording Industry Association (ARIA), which recognise excellence, innovation, and achievement across all genres of the music of Australia. They commenced in 1987.

Year	Nominee / work	Award	Result	Ref.
2021	Crossover (with the PutBacks)	Best Blues and Roots Album	Nominated	
2021	Crossover (with the PutBacks)	Best Independent Release	Nominated	
2022	Under These Streets (with the PutBacks)	Best Soul/R&B Release	Nominated	
2024	Till My Song Is Done	Best Solo Artist	Nominated	
2024	Till My Song Is Done	Best Adult Contemporary Album	Nominated	
2026	Take Me to the River	Best Blues & Roots Album	Won	

=== Australian Music Prize ===
The Australian Music Prize (the AMP) is an annual award of $30,000 given to an Australian band or solo artist in recognition of the merit of an album released during the year of award. It commenced in 2005.

Year	Nominee / work	Award	Result	Ref.
2020	Crossover	Album of the Year	Nominated	
2021	Under These Streets	Australian Music Prize	Nominated	

=== The Deadly Awards ===
The Deadly Awards, commonly known simply as The Deadlys, was an annual celebration of Australian Aboriginal and Torres Strait Islander achievement in music, sport, entertainment and community. The ran from 1995 to 2013.

Year	Nominee / work	Award	Result	Ref.
2003	Emma Donovan	Female Artist of the Year	Nominated	
2005	Emma Donovan	Female Artist of the Year	Nominated	
2009	Emma Donovan	Female Artist of the Year	Nominated	
2009	"Ngarraanga"	Single of the Year	Nominated	

=== J Awards ===
The J Awards are an annual series of Australian music awards that were established by the Australian Broadcasting Corporation's youth-focused radio station Triple J. They commenced in 2005.

Year	Nominee / work	Award	Result	Ref.
2015	herself	Double J Artist of the Year	Nominated	
2021	Emma Donovan & The Putbacks	Double J Artist of the Year	Nominated	

=== Music Victoria Awards ===
The Music Victoria Awards, are an annual awards night celebrating Victorian music. They commenced in 2005.

Year	Nominee / work	Award	Result	Ref.
2015	Dawn (Emma Donovan & The Putbacks)	Best Soul, Funk, R'n'B and Gospel Album	Won	
2015	Emma Donovan	Best Indigenous Act	Won	
2016	Emma Donovan	Best Indigenous Act	Nominated	
2021	herself	Outstanding Woman in Music	Nominated	
2021	Crossover	Best Victorian Album	Won	
2021	Emma Donovan and The Putbacks	Best Group	Won	
2021	Emma Donovan and The Putbacks	Best Soul, Funk, R'n'B or Gospel Act	Won	
2021	Emma Donovan	Best Musician	Nominated	
2022	Emma Donovan & The Putbacks	Best Group	Won	

=== National Indigenous Music Awards ===
The National Indigenous Music Awards recognise excellence, innovation and leadership among Aboriginal and Torres Strait Islander musicians from throughout Australia. They commenced in 2004.

Year	Nominee / work	Award	Result	Ref.
2015	Dawn (Emma Donovan and Putbacks)	Album of the Year	Nominated	
2015	"Black Woman"	Song of the Year	Nominated	
2016	Emma Donovan	Artist of the Year	Nominated	
2022	Under These Streets	Album of the Year	Nominated	
2024	Emma Donovan	Artist of the Year	Nominated	
2024	Til My Song Is Done	Album of the Year	Nominated	
2025	Emma Donovan	Artist of the Year	Nominated	

=== National Live Music Awards ===
The National Live Music Awards (NLMAs) commenced in 2016 to recognise contributions to the live music industry in Australia.

Year	Nominee / work	Award	Result	Ref.
2023	Emma Donovan and the Putbacks	Best Live Act in Victoria	Nominated	
2023	Emma Donovan and the Putbacks	Best R&B or Soul Act	Nominated	
2023	Emma Donovan	Live Voice in Victoria	Nominated	
2026	Take Me to the River	Album of the Year	Nominated	
2026	"Thick Skin" by Baker Boy (featuring Thelma Plum, Emma Donovan, Kee'Ahn & Jada Weazel)	Song of the Year	Won	
2026	"Thick Skin" by Baker Boy (featuring Thelma Plum, Emma Donovan, Kee'Ahn & Jada Weazel)	Film Clip of the Year	Won	

=== Rolling Stone Australia Awards ===
The Rolling Stone Australia Awards are awarded annually in January or February by the Australian edition of Rolling Stone magazine for outstanding contributions to popular culture in the previous year.

Year	Nominee / work	Award	Result	Ref.
2025	Til My Song Is Done	Best LP/EP	Shortlisted	
