= Golledge =

Golledge is a surname. Notable people with the surname include:

- Andy Golledge, Australian country music singer and songwriter
- Les Golledge (1911–1989), English footballer
- Reginald Golledge (1937–2009), Australian-born American professor of geography
