= Big Scary =

Australian musical duo

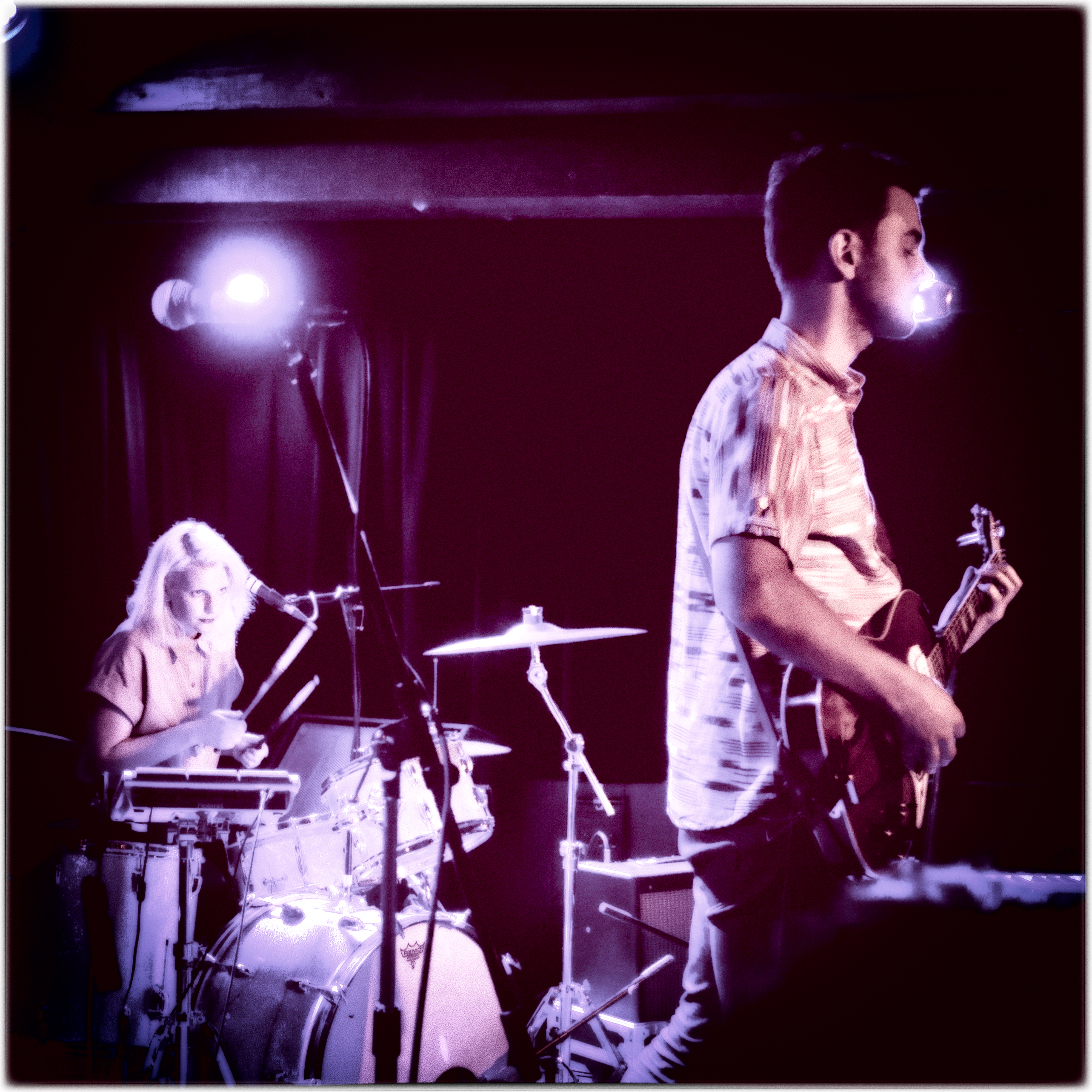
- Big Scary performing in Seattle in 2014

Background information
- Origin: Melbourne, Victoria, Australia
- Genres: Indie pop, garage rock
- Years active: 2006–present
- Labels: Big Scary, Pieater
- Members: Tom Iansek; Joanna Syme
- Website: http://bigscary.net

Big Scary are an Australian musical duo formed in Melbourne in 2006, by Tom Iansek and Joanna Syme. The pair have released several EPs and five studio albums.

Their 2013 album Not Art was nominated for the Australian Album of the Year at the J Awards of 2012, Best Independent Album at the AIR Awards of 2013 and also for Best Independent Release at the ARIA Music Awards of 2013. Not Art won the 2014 Australian Music Prize, winning the band $30 000.

In 2010 Iansek formed a side project, #1 Dads.

Big Scary's 2016 single "The Opposite of Us" was certified gold in Australia in 2020.

== History ==
=== 2006–2010: Formation and early EPs ===
Big Scary formed in 2006 as a modern folk band with simple shakers and acoustic guitar after the two met through a recommendation of mutual friends. Joanna Syme recalls "Tom was looking to put together a band and needed a drummer. He ended up on my doorstep with a guitar". The duo played casually together in between day jobs until 2008 when Iansek completed a program in audio engineering. Syme said "All of a sudden he was paying a lot more attention to production, and the direction of the band changed."

In late 2008, the band headed into the studio for the first time, recording six live tracks in a single day. In October 2008, they duo uploaded "The Apple Song" onto Triple J Unearthed and officially released in December 2008, alongside a self-titled debut EP.

In March 2009, "This Weight" was released followed in July 2009 with their 4-track EP The Mini EP and single "Hey Somebody" and EP At the Mercy of Elements in January 2010.

In 2010, the duo recorded and released limited-edition EPs named and inspired by each seasonal turn. Upon completing the task in December 2010, the four EPs were compiled into the compilation, The Big Scary Four Seasons. Beat Magazine said "Four Seasons proves to be the defining turning point for Big Scary, for they are no longer the next best thing in Australian music, they are the best thing" while the AU Review hailed "the versatility and obscene talent of the players." At the J Awards of 2010, they were nominated for Unearthed Artist of the Year. The song "Autumn", was placed in a high-profile AT&T advert in the USA and released as a single in January 2011.

=== 2011–2020: Vacation, Not Art and Animal ===
In July 2011, Big Scary released "Mix Tape", the lead single from their debut studio album, Vacation. This was followed by "Gladiator" in September 2011. Vacation was released in October 2011 and peaked at number 37 on the ARIA Charts. Beat Magazine said the album "delves into the theme of slowing losing touch with all those important things we like – friends, lovers, a home and that nifty thing known as employment." Two further singles were released from the album and the band extensively toured USA in 2012.

In February 2013, Big Scary released "Phil Collins", followed by "Luck Now" in April. The duo's second studio album, Not Art was released in June 2013 and peaked at number 32 on the ARIA chart. "Twin Rivers" was released in November 2013. At the ARIA Music Awards of 2013, the album was nominated for two awards. The album won the Australian Music Prize of 2013. The duo signed with Barsuk Records who released Not Art in North America in March 2014.

In September 2015, Big Scary released "Organism", the lead single from their third studio album.

In June 2016, the duo released the six-minute sonic, "Over Matter" and announced the released of their third studio album Animal; a four-part experience drawing inspiration of the daily cycle of the animal kingdom, hunting, lurking, resting and waking. Animal was released on 2 September 2016 and peaked at number 5 on the ARIA charts. The album was supported by their first Australian headline tour in three years. At the ARIA Music Awards of 2017, Iansek was nominated for Producer of the Year.

=== 2021–present: Daisy and Me and You ===
In February 2021, Big Scary released "Stay", their first new music in four years and announced the release of their forthcoming fourth studio album Daisy. Singles "Get Out" and "Bursting At the Seams" preceded the album's release on 30 April 2021.

In August 2022, Big Scary released "Real Love" and "Devotion" preceding their fifth studio album, Me and You, which was released on 23 September 2022.

== Discography ==
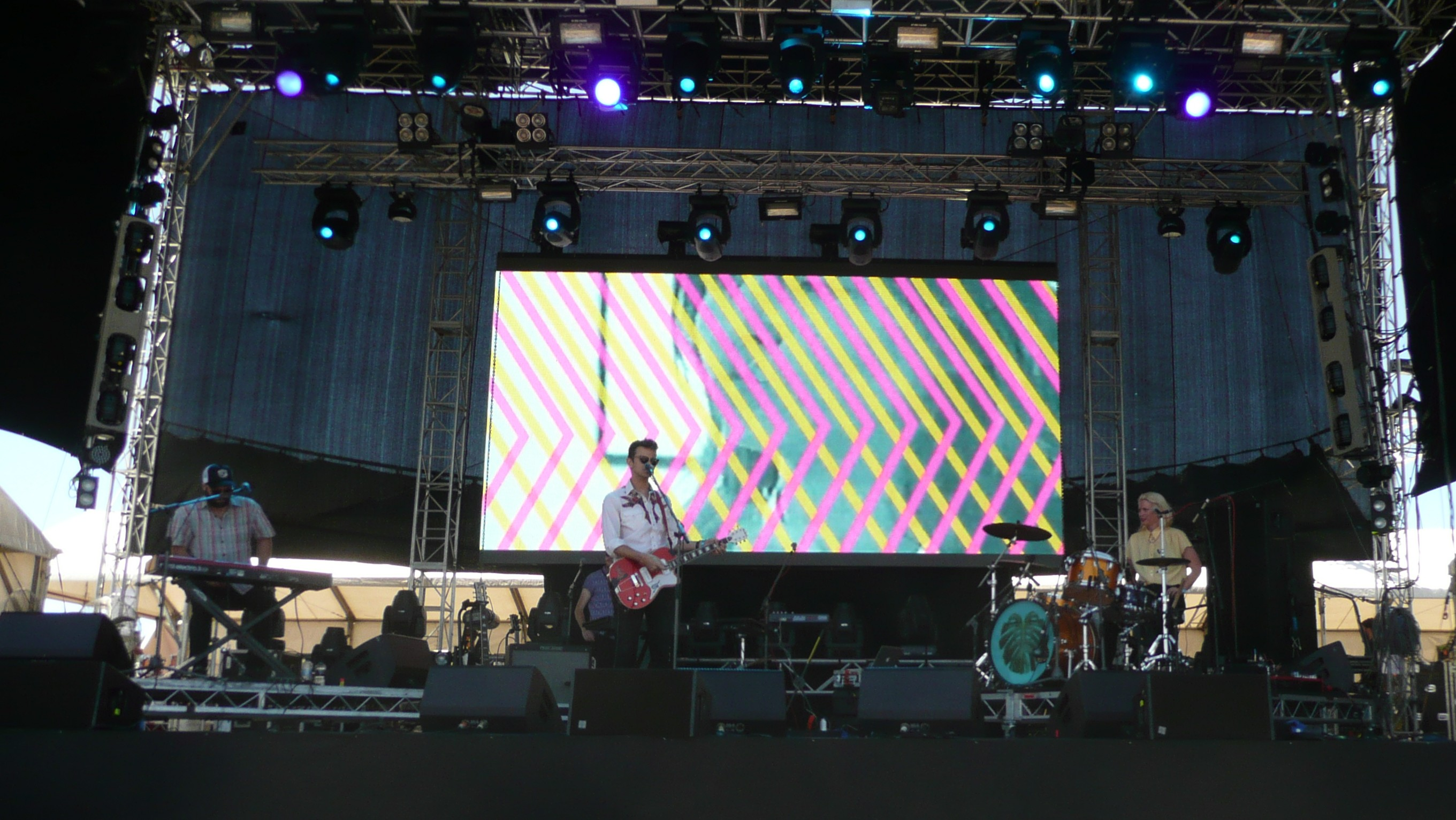
Big Scary at Southbound in 2014

=== Studio albums ===
List of studio albums, with release date, label, and selected chart positions shown
Title	Details	Peak chart positions
Title	Details	AUS
Vacation	Released: 7 October 2011; Label: Big Scary (BS04); Format: CD, LP, digital download	37
Not Art	Released: 28 June 2013; Label: Pieater (PIE006); Format: CD, LP, digital download, streaming	32
Animal	Released: 2 September 2016; Label: Pieater (PIE012); Format: CD, LP, digital download, streaming	5
Daisy	Released: 30 April 2021; Label: Pieater (PIE031); Format: CD, LP, digital download, streaming	46
Me and You	Released: 23 September 2022; Label: Pieater (PIE033); Format: CD, LP, digital download, streaming	74
Wing	Released: 16 February 2024; Label: Pieater; Format: CD, LP, digital download, streaming	TBA

=== Compilations ===
List of compilations, with release date and label shown
Title	Details
The Big Scary Four Seasons	Released: 6 December 2010; Label: Big Scary; Format: CD, LP, digital download; Compilation of the four seasons EPs.

=== Extended plays ===
List of EPs, with release date and label shown
Title	Details
Big Scary	Released: December 2008; Label: Big Scary; Format: CD, digital download
The Mini EP	Released: July 2009; Label: Big Scary; Format: CD, digital download
At the Mercy of the Elements	Released: January 2010; Label: Big Scary; Format: CD, digital download
Autumn	Released: March 2010; Label: Big Scary; Format: Digital download
Winter	Released: June 2010; Label: Big Scary; Format: Digital download
Spring	Released: September 2010; Label: Big Scary; Format: Digital download
Summer	Released: December 2010; Label: Big Scary; Format: Digital download

=== Singles ===
List of singles, with release date and selected chart positions shown
Title	Year	Peak chart positions	Certifications	Album
Title	Year	AUS	Certifications	Album
"The Apple Song"	2008	—		Big Scary
"This Weight"	2009	—		The Mini EP
"Hey Somebody"	2009	—		At the Mercy of the Elements
"Autumn"	2011	—		The Big Scary Four Seasons
"Mixtape"	2011	—		Vacation
"Gladiator"	2011	—		Vacation
"Leaving Home"	2012	—		Vacation
"Falling Away"	2012	—		Vacation
"Phil Collins"	2013	—		Not Art
"Luck Now"	2013	—		Not Art
"Twin Rivers"	2013	—		Not Art
"Invest"	2014	—		Not Art
"Organism"	2015	—		Animal
"Over Matter"	2016	—		Animal
"The Opposite of Us"	2016	100	ARIA: Gold	Animal
"Stay"	2021	—		Daisy
"Get Out!"	2021	—		Daisy
"Bursting At the Seams"	2021	—		Daisy
"Real Love"	2022	—		Me and You
"Devotion"	2022	—		Me and You
"Goodbye Earle Street"	2022	—		Me and You
"Something to Remember"	2024	—		Wing
"A Ribbon to Hold Us"	2024	—		Wing

== Awards and nominations ==
=== AIR Awards ===
The Australian Independent Record Awards (commonly known informally as AIR Awards) is an annual awards night to recognise, promote and celebrate the success of Australia's Independent Music sector.

Year	Nominee / work	Award	Result	Ref.
2011	themselves	Breakthrough Independent Artist	Nominated	
2013	themselves	Best Independent Artist	Nominated	
2013	Not Art	Best Independent Album	Nominated	
2013	"Luck Now"	Best Independent Single/EP	Nominated	
2013	themselves	Carlton Dry Global Music Grant	Nominated	
2017	Animal	Best Independent Album	Nominated	
2017	"The Opposite of Us"	Best Independent Single/EP	Nominated	
2022	Daisy	Best Independent Pop Album or EP	Won	
2023	Me and You	Best Independent Pop Album or EP	Nominated	

=== Australian Music Prize ===
The Australian Music Prize (the AMP) is an annual award of $30,000 given to an Australian band or solo artist in recognition of the merit of an album released during the year of award.

Year	Nominee / work	Award	Result
2013	Not Art	Australian Music Prize	Won
2016	Animal	Australian Music Prize	Nominated

=== ARIA Music Awards ===
The ARIA Music Awards is an annual awards ceremony that recognises excellence, innovation, and achievement across all genres of Australian music. Big Scary have been nominated for three awards.

Year	Nominee / work	Award	Result
2013	Not Art	Breakthrough Artist - Release	Nominated
2013	Not Art	Best Independent Release	Nominated
2017	Tom Iansek for Animal by Big Scary	Producer of the Year	Nominated
2021	Daisy	Best Adult Contemporary Album	Nominated

=== J Awards ===
The J Awards are an annual series of Australian music awards that were established by the Australian Broadcasting Corporation's youth-focused radio station Triple J.

Year	Nominee / work	Award	Result
2010	themselves	Unearthed Artist of the Year	Nominated
2011	Vacation	Australian Album of the Year	Nominated
2013	Not Art	Australian Album of the Year	Nominated
2016	Animal	Australian Album of the Year	Nominated

=== Music Victoria Awards ===
The Music Victoria Awards, are an annual awards night celebrating Victorian music. They commenced in 2005.

Year	Nominee / work	Award	Result
2013	Not Art	Best Album	Nominated
2020	Tom Iansek (Big Scary)	Best Musician	Nominated
