= Me and You (Big Scary album) =

Studio album by Big Scary
- Released: 23 September 2022
- Studios: BellBird, Collingwood
- Length: 36:59
- Label: Pieater
- Producer: Big Scary

Big Scary chronology
| Daisy (2021) | Me and You (2022) | Wing (2024) |

Singles from Me and You
- 1. "Real Love" Released: 16 August 2022; 2. "Devotion" Released: 16 August 2022; 3. "Goodbye Earle Street" Released: 2 September 2022

Me and You is the fifth studio album by Australian indie pop duo Big Scary. It was announced on 16 August 2022 alongside the album's two lead singles, and released on 23 September 2022.

About the album, Big Scary said "We want the album to sound timeless, but with an air of yesteryear. It's a record of light and shade; of innocence and spoiled beauty. We sing about romantic, protective, possessive and disappointing love; of self destructive holding patterns and outbursts; and reflect on the integrity of casting judgements."

At the AIR Awards of 2023, the album was nominated for Best Independent Pop Album or EP.

== Reception ==
Professional ratings
Review scores
| Source | Rating |
|---|---|
| The Guardian | 3/5 stars |

Giselle Au-Nhien Nguyen from The Guardian called the album "introspective and varied, with wonderful, harrowing moments". Nguyen said, "Me and You is largely a more subdued affair, swapping synthesisers for acoustic and piano-led numbers, and looking more inwards than the duo has previously."

Double J wrote that "Unlike last year's Daisy, Big Scary's fifth record feels gentle. The guitars are largely acoustic, a lot of the synths from last year's album are traded for grand piano, and the melodies are a little less direct and somewhat more ethereal" adding "Big Scary's new album has no real lowlights. Its ten tracks are somewhat varied in their tone, but consistent in their quality."

Bryget Christfield from Beat Magazine felt that "Big Scary somehow capture the beauty, fragility and sorrow of humanity through their song writing. An all-encompassing, sometimes-tearful listening experience. Headphones recommended."

Simon Winkler from Stack Magazine said "Big Scary examine the seams of devotion on Me and You... [and] as hinted in the title, partnership lies at the heart of this new album. Vocal duties are shared, sometimes alternated [and] sometimes in a close echo of each other."

Ellie Robinson from NME wrote that the band's "penchant for poignancy is mellowed out by their sweetest and more serene tonal palette to date", and described it as an improvement from Daisy, writing that "there is ... a looseness and jammy, free-flowing energy that imbues into this record an intimacy that was sorely missing from its predecessor."

== Track listing ==
All tracks are written by Tom Iansek and Joanna Syme.

Me and You track listing
| No. | Title | Length |
|---|---|---|
| 1. | "F.A." | 4:36 |
| 2. | "Firefly" | 4:40 |
| 3. | "Asking Right" | 3:56 |
| 4. | "All the Pieces" | 3:40 |
| 5. | "Lonely Age" | 3:18 |
| 6. | "In My View" | 2:50 |
| 7. | "Goodbye Earl Street" | 3:09 |
| 8. | "Devotion" | 4:09 |
| 9. | "Real Love" | 4:28 |
| 10. | "You Won't Always" | 2:13 |
| Total length: | | 36:59 |

== Charts ==
Chart performance for Me and You
| Chart (2022) | Peak position |
|---|---|
| Australian Albums (ARIA) | 74 |

== Release history ==
Release history for Me and You
| Country | Date | Format | Label | Catalogue |
|---|---|---|---|---|
| Australia | 23 September 2022 | CD; digital download; streaming; LP | Pieater | PIE033CD / PIE033LPC |
