= Daisy (Big Scary album) =

Studio album by Big Scary
- Released: 30 April 2021
- Length: 29:12
- Label: Pieater
- Producer: Big Scary

Big Scary chronology
Animal (2016)	Daisy (2021)	Me and You (2022)

Singles from Daisy
- 1. "Stay" Released: 24 February 2021; 2. "Get Out!" Released: 23 March 2021; 3. "Bursting at the Seams" Released: 27 April 2021

Daisy is the fourth studio album by Australian indie pop duo Big Scary. It was announced on 24 February 2021 alongside the album's lead single "Stay" and released on 30 April 2021. Big Scary described the album as "playful", while including "plenty of drama and for the first time, no guitars".

At the 2021 ARIA Music Awards, the album was nominated for Best Adult Contemporary Album.

At the AIR Awards of 2022, the album won Best Independent Pop Album or EP

== Singles ==
"Stay" was released on 24 February 2021 as the lead single. Big Scary said "'Stay' is about the anxiety you sometimes feel when invited to leave the safe bubble of home [...] but grateful to friends who offer invitations."

"Get Out!" was released on 23 March 2021. According to a press release, the bouncing synth drama draws on Michael Jackson's "Billie Jean", enabling the song to have something of a strut. Jo Syme said "The song is made up of little parts that build on top of each other, and add the magic."

"Bursting at the Seams" was released on 27 April 2021 as the album's third single. It is the band's first single to feature drummer Jo Syme on vocals.

== Reception ==
Professional ratings
Review scores
Source	Rating
NME	4/5 stars

Double J noted the absence of guitar but said "these songs don't feel empty without it. The array of synth sounds employed in their place are bright, beautiful and bubbly... Big Scary might sound a bit different on Daisy, but they still feel like the same band we know and love."

Holly Pereira from Stack Magazine said "Naturally, their sound has evolved between albums. Syme's soulful vocal makes more of an appearance, while Iansek's #1 Dads side project has had a clear influence on his songwriting, with arrangements much more delicate across the record. The duo have deliberately kept the album as live-sounding as possible, forgoing overdubs for a sound that captures what Big Scary do best."

Cyclone Wehner from NME called the album "their grooviest album yet" saying "On Daisy, the band express optimism, exuding mindfulness and an appreciation of innocent pleasures."

== Track listing ==
Daisy track listing
No.	Title	Writer(s)	Length
1.	"Chapter IV"	Tom Iansek; Joanna Syme	0:58
2.	"A Breath"	Iansek; Syme	0:58
3.	"Wake"	Iansek; Syme	5:01
4.	"Love to Love"	Iansek; Syme	4:23
5.	"Stay"	Iansek; Syme	3:14
6.	"Get Out!"	Iansek; Syme	5:12
7.	"Kind of World"	Iansek; Syme	2:32
8.	"Bursting at the Seams"	Iansek; Syme	4:14
9.	"One in a Million"	Iansek; Syme	2:40
Total length:			29:12

== Charts ==
Chart performance for Daisy
Chart (2021)	Peak position
Australian Albums (ARIA)	46

== Release history ==
Release history for Daisy
Country	Date	Format	Label	Catalogue
Australia	30 April 2021	CD; digital download; streaming; LP	Pieater	PIE031
