= Tattoos Used to Come Off in the Pool =

Studio album by Jem Cassar-Daley
- Released: 28 August 2026
- Length: 29:37
- Labels: Jem Cassar-Daley; Civilians
- Producers: Michael De Lorenzis; Robby De Sá; Garrett Kato; Michael Paynter; Ethan Reginato; Brock Westover

Jem Cassar-Daley chronology
I Don't Know Who to Call (2022)	Tattoos Used to Come Off in the Pool (2026)

Singles from Tattoos Used to Come Off in the Pool
- 1. "Clichés" Released: 25 February 2026; 2. "Speak Now" Released: 15 April 2026; 3. "Cool Girl" Released: 17 June 2026; 4. "All I'm Thinking About" Released: 24 July 2026

Tattoos Used to Come Off in the Pool is the debut studio album by the Australian singer-songwriter Jem Cassar-Daley. The album was announced in July 2026 and released on 28 August 2026.

Upon announcement, Cassar-Daley said "A lot of the album points to growing up and coming of age. It's a bit of that project for me – I have written it over some pretty formative years of my life. It's all about new experiences, getting older and navigating through life." The album gets its name from a moment when Cassar-Daley, then 21 years old, jumped in the pool and realised her new tattoo would not come off, unlike temporary tattoos she put on her skin as a child.

Cassar-Daley will support the album with an Australian tour in September 2026, including dates in Adelaide and Brisbane.

== Track listing ==
Tattoos Used to Come Off in the Pool track listing
No.	Title	Writer(s)	Producer(s)	Length
1.	"Speak Now"	Jem Cassar-Daley; Michael De Lorenzis; Kye; Michael Paynter	De Lorenzis; Paynter	3:05
2.	"Clichés"	Cassar-Daley; Jordyn Dodd; Brock Westover	Westover	2:50
3.	"Forget I Ever Said It"	Cassar-Daley; Charlie Pittman; Ethan Reginato	Reginato	3:00
4.	"Into Sunsets"	Cassar-Daley; Brendon Boney	Garrett Kato	4:48
5.	"All I'm Thinking About"	Cassar-Daley; De Lorenzis; Shannen James	De Lorenzis	3:30
6.	"Cool Girl"	Cassar-Daley; Robby De Sá	De Sá	2:37
7.	"Souvenir"	Cassar-Daley; Brigetta Truitt; Westover	Westover	2:38
8.	"I Take It"	Cassar-Daley; Pittman; Reginato	Reginato	3:03
9.	"Growing"	Cassar-Daley; Joshua Oliver	Kato	4:06
Total length:				29:37

== Charts ==
Chart performance for Tattoos Used to Come Off in the Pool
Chart (2026)	Peak position
Australian Albums (ARIA)	18
