= Laps Around the Sun =

Laps Around the Sun may refer to:

- Laps Around the Sun (Chris Lane album), a 2018 album by American country singer Chris Lane
- Laps Around the Sun (Ziggy Alberts album), a 2018 album by Australian singer Ziggy Alberts
