= The Big Scary Four Seasons =

Compilation album by Big Scary
- Released: 6 December 2010
- Recorded: 2010
- Studio: Soundpark Studios & Summerland Studio
- Genre: Pop rock
- Length: 37:17
- Label: Big Scary
- Producer: Matt Voigt & Big Scary

Big Scary chronology
Summer (2010)	The Big Scary Four Seasons (2010)	Vacation (2011)

The Big Scary Four Seasons is a compilation album by Australian Indie pop duo Big Scary. It was released on 6 December 2010 and features the tracks from the four individually themed extended plays released throughout 2010.

== Critical reception ==
Professional ratings
Review scores
Source	Rating
The AU Review	8/10 stars

Beat Magazine said "Four Seasons is like no other local release of 2010. Standing above and apart in its ambition, diversity and sheer enjoyment. Its finer details can be appreciated individually, but it is collectively that it sharply pulls into focus a remarkable portrait of a thrilling band that is resolutely contemporary. A well-deserved summary that acts as the crowning achievement of a victorious year for the group, Four Seasons proves to be the defining turning point for Big Scary."

Kat Mahina from The AU Review said "Concept records can be a hit and miss in terms of substance, structure and the overall aesthetic of the finished product. Melbourne duo Big Scary have done well with the marketing idea behind their Four Seasons compilation, which is the amalgamation of tracks from their four EPs." Mahina said it "lacks the cohesive feel of an album... but was to be expected with the collection of songs chosen to appear on the final compilation." Mahina concluded saying "The Big Scary Four Seasons is a grand introduction to their sound."

George Dow from Hybrid Magazine said "Four Seasons is an indie-rock grower. On first listen the record did nothing at all for me, then suddenly, after throwing the record on shuffle amongst some other new records, I found myself continuously drawn back to their songs. Each time something I didn't recognise came on I found myself stopping to see who I was listening to. Each time it was The Big Scary."

== Track listing ==
The Big Scary Four Seasons track listing
No.	Title	Writer(s)	EP	Length
1.	"Spring"	Tom Iansek; Joanna Syme	Spring	2:10
2.	"Hamilton"	Iansek; Syme	Spring	3:26
3.	"Gem in the Granite"	Iansek; Syme	Spring	3:03
4.	"Summer"	Iansek; Syme	Summer	2:36
5.	"Tuesday Is Rent Day"	Iansek; Syme	Summer	2:38
6.	"All That You've Got"	Iansek; Syme	Summer	2:08
7.	"Summer's Last Gasp"	Iansek; Syme	Summer	1:40
8.	"Autumn"	Iansek; Syme	Autumn	3:52
9.	"Microwave Pizza"	Iansek; Syme	Autumn	3:52
10.	"Home"	Iansek; Syme	Autumn	2:25
11.	"Winter"	Iansek; Syme	Winter	4:11
12.	"Thinking About You"	Iansek; Syme	Winter	3:53
13.	"The Deep Freeze"	Iansek; Syme	Winter	2:12
Total length:				37:17

== Release history ==
Release history for The Big Scary Four Seasons
Country	Date	Format	Label	Catalogue
Australia	6 December 2010	CD; digital download; LP	Big Scary	BS04/BS05
Australia	13 January 2017	LP (re-release)	Pieater	PIE003LP
