= Nat Vazer =

Australian indie pop singer

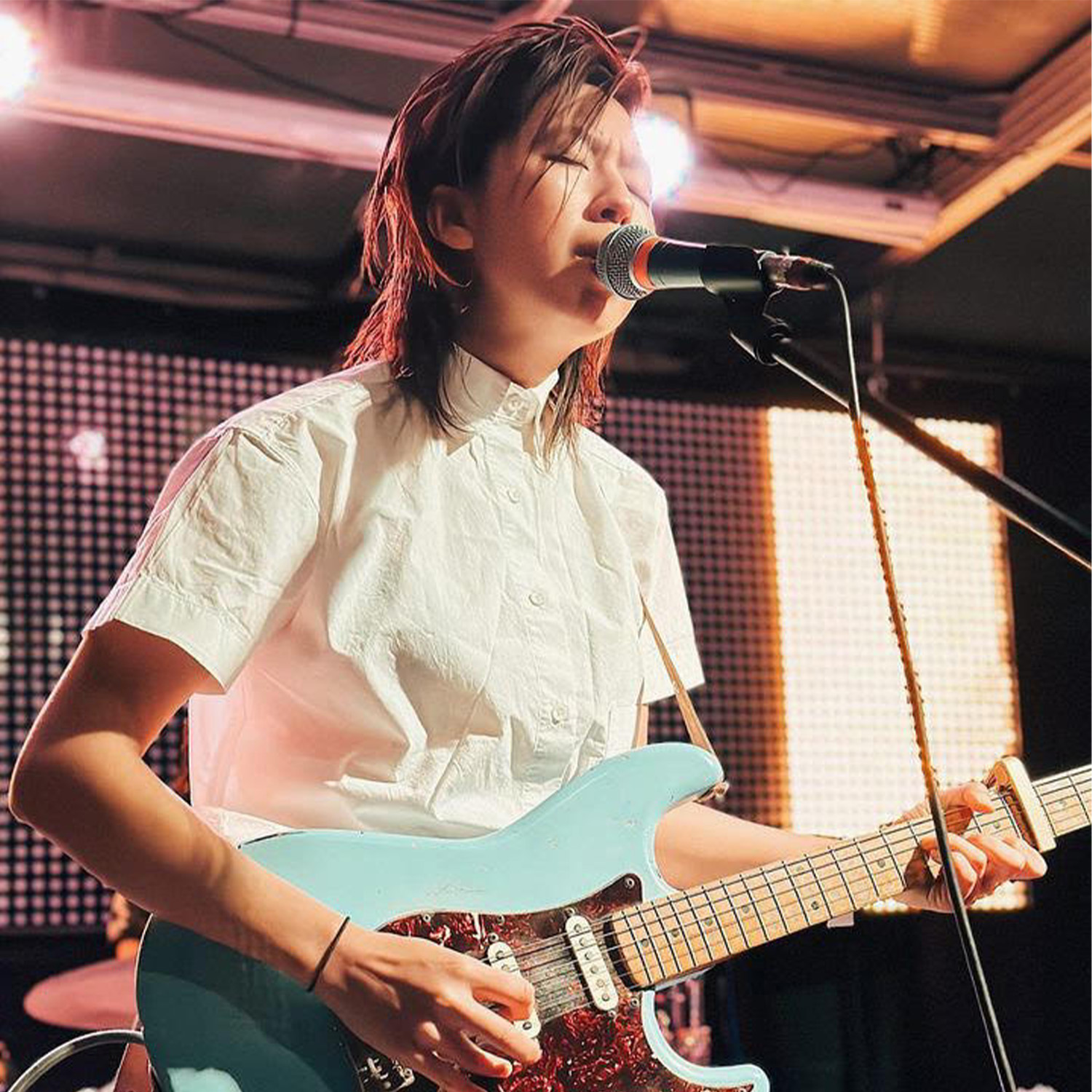
- Vazer in 2023

Background information
- Origin: Melbourne, Victoria, Australia
- Genres: Indie pop; pop rock
- Occupations: Singer; songwriter
- Instruments: Vocals; guitar; piano
- Years active: 2018–present
- Labels: Hotel Motel; Perpetual Doom; Bendigo Records
- Website: www.natvazer.com

Nat Vazer is an Australian singer-songwriter from Melbourne. Her debut album (LP), Is This Offensive and Loud?, was released in 2020 on Hotel Motel Records and was nominated for the 2020 Australian Music Prize. Vazer was nominated Best Breakthrough Act at the 2020 Music Victoria Awards.

== Early life ==
Nat Vazer was born in Melbourne, Australia in the State of Victoria, Australia. She is the daughter of Vietnamese and Malaysian immigrants. Vazer attended Wantirna College in Melbourne where she graduated as Dux and studied classical music at the Melbourne Conservatorium of Music. She wrote her debut album in 2018 while travelling around the outskirts of Toronto.

== Music career ==
Vazer has been described by the magazine WithGuitars as "a warm, charismatic, and contemplative singer songwriter with a penchant for writing charmingly rebellious tunes about the ironies of everyday life". Known to defy stereotypes, Vazer's music joins precise guitar melodies with "grungy yet blissful" vocals in "a mix of edgy, light and bubbly".

"Keep Away from Parks" was Vazer's first single, released in January 2018 and written in reaction to an incident in which a police officer told her not go out at night nor without a man. Her next single, the dream pop song "You're Winning Me Over", with a jangly guitar riff, is about reforming a relationship, and it was released in June. This was followed in September by "Struggletown", a song addressing destructive modern behavior in a 9-to-5 environment, yet with an easygoing melody and more of a jazz or doo-wop feel (compared to her normal indie pop/pop rock genre). Reviewing "Struggletown", James Alvarez of Get Some magazine praised Vazer's "haunting voice and an uncanny ear for Beach Boys melodies".

Vazer's debut extended play, We Used to Have Real Conversations, was released 21 September 2018, containing the three preceding singles and also the songs "Privilege", "Restless", and "Summer Holiday". "Privilege", about coming to awareness of white privilege, was itself released as a single in November and is inspired by the series Dear White People and the diaries of Kurt Cobain. As of 2019, Vazer is signed to the Melbourne record label Hotel Motel.

On 29 May 2020, Vazer released her debut LP Is This Offensive and Loud?, on Hotel Motel Records. The album was named in several best-albums-the-year lists including NME Australia and The Music and was nominated for the Australian Music Prize 2020. A limited edition cassette of the LP was also released on 30 October 2020 on Perpetual Doom Records based in Brooklyn, New York.

== Discography ==
=== Albums ===
Title	Details
Is This Offensive and Loud?	Released: May 2020; Format: CD, LP, Cassette, digital download, streaming; Label: Nat Vazer, Hotel Motel Records (HOM0031LP), Perpetual Doom (PD006)
Strange Adrenaline	Released: October 2023; Format: CD, LP, digital download, streaming; Label: Nat Vazer, Bendigo Records (BR0001)

=== EPs ===
List of EPs, with selected details
Title	Details
We Used to Have Real Conversations	Released: October 2018; Format: CD, digital download, streaming; Label: Inertia, Hotel Motel Records, Nat Vazer

== Awards and nominations ==
=== AIR Awards ===
The Australian Independent Record Awards (commonly known informally as AIR Awards) is an annual awards night to recognise, promote and celebrate the success of Australia's Independent Music sector.

Year	Nominee / work	Award	Result	Ref.
2024	Strange Adrenaline	Best Independent Pop Album or EP	Nominated	
2024	This Much Talent for Nat Vazer Strange Adrenaline	Independent Publicity Team of the Year	Nominated	

=== Music Victoria Awards ===
Year	Nominee / work	Award	Result	Ref.
2020	herself	Best Breakthrough Act	Nominated	

=== Australian Music Prize ===
Year	Nominee / work	Award	Result	Ref.
2020	Is This Offensive and Loud?	Australian Music Prize	Nominated	
2023	Strange Adrenaline	Australian Music Prize	Nominated	
