= Aluka (band) =

Australian band

Aluka is an Australian band, based in Melbourne and consisting of three vocalists Rachael Head, Sally Mortensen and Annabelle Tunley. The band formed in 2008 after the members met studying music performance. Their music is usually classified as a cappella, but is unusual for the genre as they co-write and perform original music, with pop, hip hop and R&B elements. Also unusually, Aluka's vocal harmonies are constructed without using music theory, often straying from a typical harmonic structure to produce sounds not generally associated with standard a cappella.

== History ==
The band played their first show at the Northcote Social Club. They have since played a range of venues and festivals across Australia, including the Sydney Opera House, Queenscliff Music Festival, Adelaide Fringe Festival and Apollo Bay Music Festival.

== Recordings ==
Aluka released their debut, self-titled, 5 track EP in 2009. Their debut album 'Space' was released on 5 April 2013. Space was produced by Nick Huggins, who has previously worked with Kid Sam and Oscar + Martin. 'Keep My Cool', the first single from the album, was launched in Melbourne on 7 November. The release featured a remix of 'Keep My Cool' by Oscar Key Sung. The album was launched with shows across Australia in April and May 2013.

=== Locations ===
‘Space' was recorded in a number of unusual locations in Victoria, each paired with a track on the album to complement that song.

Track	Location
Keep My Cool	Stairwell, Hawthorn
Body	Undisclosed
Cave	Bathrooms
Station	Bendigo Tram Depot
Street	Laundry, Kitchen, Hallway – Point Lonsdale house
Lucy	World War II bunker – Point Lonsdale
Swim Down	Cars
Vision	Room with pianos – shopfront in Preston, Melbourne
Tip Toe	Farmyard shed – Whittlesea
Say	Indoor swimming pool

== Back-up vocals ==
Though not performing as Aluka, Head, Mortensen and Tunley have also performed together as back-up singers for other Australian artists. In 2010 the trio recorded backing vocals on Clare Bowditch's album Modern Day Addiction, as part of her band The New Slang. They toured with Bowditch in 2009 and 2010. They have also performed with Lisa Mitchell and Missy Higgins.
