= Better Off (disambiguation) =

Better Off is an American rock band.

Better Off may also refer to:

- "Better Off", a song by Ariana Grande from the album Sweetener, 2018
- "Better Off", a song by Cory Marks from the album Who I Am, 2020
- "Better Off", a song by Sara Evans from the album Slow Me Down, 2014
- "Better Off", a song by Theory of a Deadman from the album Gasoline, 2005
- "Better Off", a song by Ziggy Alberts from the EP Four Feet in the Forest, 2016
- "Better Off (Alone, Pt. III)", a song by Alan Walker, Dash Berlin and Vikkstar123, 2023
