= Birdz (rapper) =

Indigenous Australian rapper and musician

- Born: Nathan Bird; Rockhampton, Queensland, Australia
- Origin: Katherine, Northern Territory
- Genre: Australian hip hop
- Occupations: Rapper; songwriter; record producer; musician
- Instrument: Vocals
- Years active: 2013–present
- Label: Bad Apples

Nathan Bird, known professionally as Birdz, is an Australian rapper, songwriter, and record producer. As of 2021, he has released one studio album and two extended plays. His second studio album, Legacy, was released on 19 November 2021.

A prominent activist, Birdz describes his music as a "declaration of survival".

== Early life ==
Nathan Bird is a Butchulla man who was born in Rockhampton, Queensland, grew up in Katherine, Northern Territory, and describes himself as "a proud Murri man with Badtjala, Juru, Scottish and Melanesian heritage."

In 2019, Bird said "I remember staying up late on the weekends just so that I could catch Rage play the standard half an hour of rap videos, before their programming would return to whatever was popular on the Australian charts at the time. Seeing artists like Ice Cube speak out against police brutality and racism on "Fuck tha Police" is still one of the coolest things I've ever witnessed. It reminded me of my father and how his confidence would never break stride, no matter where he was or who he was with. Since that day, my passion for hip-hop has never wavered."

== Career ==
Birdz released "Red Black and Yellow" in June 2013 which is inspired by experiences as a young Aboriginal man residing in Brisbane, Queensland. The song paints a vivid picture of the everyday challenges black Australia continues to endure. Birdz released his debut EP Birdz Eye View in September 2013.

In February 2015, Birdz told The Guardian "I'm a full-time rapper and part-time support worker for Link-Up Victoria, currently residing in Melbourne."

Birdz released his debut studio album Train of Thought in August 2017. At the Music Victoria Awards of 2017, the album was nominated for Best Hip Hop Album, while it won Best Independent Hip Hop Album at the AIR Awards of 2018.

2019 saw Birdz release EP, Place of Dreams, which was produced by Ngarrindjeriy rapper and producer, Trials, of Adelaide hip-hop crew the Funkoars, and Indigenous hip-hop duo A. B. Original. A video for album single 'Black Child' featured Indigenous musicians, Kaiit, Mo’Ju, Alice Skye, along with Rebecca Mabo, Shannan Marino and Cormach Evans. The video co-opts and subverts Eurocentric iconography and emphasises achievements of Indigenous Australian people.

In 2021, Birdz's single 'Bagi-la-m Bargan' featuring his cousin and Butchulla songman, Fred Leone, appeared in Triple J's Hottest 100. The song is written from the perspective a Wonamutta warrior in 1770 CE preparing to defend the island of K’gari against the British Naval vessel, the Endeavour, and its commander, Captain James Cook.

On 1 October 2021, Birdz released "Legacy Part 2", a collaboration with Missy Higgins.

In November 2021, Birdz released album Legacy on Bad Apples Music. Album tracks were once again produced by Trials.

== Discography ==
=== Studio albums ===
List of albums, with release date and label shown
Title	Details
Train of Thought	Released: 18 August 2017; Label: Bad Apples Music; Format: Digital download, streaming
Legacy	Released: 19 November 2021; Label: Bad Apples Music; Format: Digital download, streaming

=== Extended plays ===
List of extended plays, with release date and label shown
Title	Details
Birdz Eye View	Released: 12 September 2013; Label: Birdz; Format: Digital download, streaming
Place of Dreams	Released: 3 May 2019; Label: Bad Apples Music; Format: Digital download, streaming
Gira (with Fred Leone)	Released: 19 September 2025; Label: Forever Ever / Sony; Format: Digital download, streaming

=== Singles ===
==== As lead artist ====
List of singles, with year released and album name shown
Title	Year	Album
"Red Black and Yellow"	2013	Birdz Eye View
"Supabrotha"	2014	Non-album single
"Rise" (featuring Jimblah)	2016	Train of Thought
"Black Lives Matter"	2016	Train of Thought
"Hunger Voodoo"	2016	Train of Thought
"The Side" (featuring Serina Pech)	2017	Train of Thought
"Sunset Dreaming (Djäpana remix)" (Triple J – Like a Version)	2017	Like a Version (Volume Thirteen)
"About Me" (featuring Omar Musa)	2018	Non-album single
"Place of Dreams" (featuring Ecca Vandal)	2018	Place of Dreams
"On the Run"	2019	Place of Dreams
"Black Child" (featuring Mojo Juju)	2019	Place of Dreams
"Bagi-la-m Bargan" (featuring Fred Leone)	2020	Legacy
"Fly" (featuring Ngaiire)	2021	Legacy
"They Don't Know" (featuring Thom Crawford)	2021	Legacy
"Legacy Part 2" (featuring Missy Higgins)	2021	Legacy
"Aussie Aussie"	2021	Legacy
"Brother" (with Fred Leone)	2024	Gira
"Wanya Nyin Yanmanj" (with Fred Leone)	2025	Gira
"Gira" (with Fred Leone)	2025	Gira

== Awards and nominations ==
=== AIR Awards ===
The Australian Independent Record Awards (known colloquially as the AIR Awards) is an annual awards night to recognise, promote and celebrate the success of Australia's Independent Music sector.

Year	Nominee / work	Award	Result	Ref.
2018	Train of Thought	Best Independent Hip Hop Album	Won	

=== Music Victoria Awards ===
The Music Victoria Awards, are an annual awards night celebrating Victorian music. They commenced in 2005.

Year	Nominee / work	Award	Result	Ref.
2017	Birdz	Best Aboriginal Act	Nominated	
2017	Train of Thought	Best Hip Hop Album	Nominated	
2020	Birdz	Best Hip Hop Act	Won	

=== National Indigenous Music Awards ===
The National Indigenous Music Awards recognise excellence, innovation and leadership among Aboriginal and Torres Strait Islander musicians from throughout Australia. They commenced in 2004.

Year	Nominee / work	Award	Result	Ref.
2021	Himself	Artist of the Year	Nominated	
2021	"Bagi-la-m Bargan"	Song of the Year	Nominated	
2022	Legacy	Album of the Year	Nominated	
2025	Birdz (with Fred Leone)	Artist of the Year	Nominated	
2026	Birdz (with Fred Leone)	Artist of the Year	Won	
2026	Gira	Album of the Year	Nominated	
2026	"Wanya Nyin Yanmanj"	Song of the Year	Nominated	
2026	"Wanya Nyin Yanmanj"	Film Clip of the Year	Nominated	
