= Land & Sea =

Studio album by Ziggy Alberts
- Released: 12 December 2014
- Studio: Viscount Sands Caravan, Inky Studio, Fur Real Studio
- Length: 66:53
- Label: CommonFolk Records

Ziggy Alberts chronology
Made of Water (2013)	Land & Sea (2014)	Four Feet in the Forest (2016)

Singles from Land & Sea
- 1. "Days in the Sun" Released: April 2014; 2. "Gone (the Pocahontas Song)" Released: 12 December 2014

Land & Sea is the second studio album by Australian singer songwriter Ziggy Alberts. The album was released in December 2014. The album includes a number of re-recorded tracks from Feels Like Home and Made of Water alongside new tracks. Alberts said "This record was born in a caravan converted studio amongst the hills of Newrybar, New South Wales. The album drew comparisons to Jack Johnson and Xavier Rudd due to the breezy acoustic sound, chilled vocals and environmental messages.

In December 2019, the album was released on a 2x Deluxe vinyl alongside the EP Four Feet in the Forest.

== Track listing ==
No.	Title	Length
1.	"Days in the Sun" (featuring Samuel D. Hall)	3:34
2.	"Hands I Can Hold"	3:08
3.	"Gone (the Pocahontas Song)"	3:38
4.	"Youngblood"	5:01
5.	"Settle Down"	3:24
6.	"Simple Things (The Ocean Song)"	4:39
7.	"Follow the Ocean"	5:02
8.	"Church Man"	4:51
9.	"Slow Dance"	5:10
10.	"Used To"	3:35
11.	"Time Alone"	4:36
12.	"Land & Sea"	3:20
13.	"Waterside"	5:23
14.	"Sleep Well"	3:51
15.	"Warm Coffee (The Market Song)"	3:16
16.	"Simple Things" (acoustic)	4:38

== Certifications ==
Certifications for Land & Sea
Region	Certification	Certified units/sales
Australia (ARIA)	Gold	35,000^{‡}
^{‡} Sales+streaming figures based on certification alone.

== Release history ==
Region	Date	Format	Label	Catalogue
Australia	12 December 2014	digital download	CommonFolk Records	
Australia	2015	CD	CommonFolk Records	
Australia	13 December 2019	2xLP	CommonFolk Records	CMNFOLK008LP
