= King of Disappointment =

2023 single by Jem Cassar-Daley

Single by Jem Cassar-Daley
- Released: 3 May 2023
- Length: 4:11
- Label: Jem Cassar-Daley
- Songwriters: Jem Cassar-Daley; Brendan Boney
- Producer: Garrett Kato

Jem Cassar-Daley singles chronology
"You've Got a Friend" (2022)	"King of Disappointment" (2023)	"Slow Down" (2023)

"King of Disappointment" is a song by Australian singer-songwriter Jem Cassar-Daley. It was released in May 2023.

About the song, Jem Cassar-Daley said, "I had a situation where my shoes were on, makeup done and I was ready to head out the door when I got a 'Sorry, something came up' text. Instead of being sad, I decided to use it as inspiration in the studio."

At the 2024 Queensland Music Awards, the song won Song of the Year and the Pop Award. At the AIR Awards of 2024, the song won Independent Song of the Year.

== Reception ==
Dan Condon from Double J said "This is uncomplicated and completely engrossing storytelling. From her first line, you're right there alongside her, empathising with her sense of loss, hurt and shame" calling Cassar-Daley "an immense talent... and a shot at being a defining voice of this era of Australian songwriting if she wants it."
