= Vacation (Big Scary album) =

Studio album by Big Scary
- Released: 7 October 2011
- Studio: Airlock Studios (Brisbane); The Ark Studios (Brisbane)
- Genre: Pop rock
- Length: 37:18
- Label: Big Scary
- Producer: Sean Cook

Big Scary chronology
The Big Scary Four Seasons (2010)	Vacation (2011)	Not Art (2013)

Singles from Vacation
- 1. "Mixtape" Released: July 2011; 2. "Gladiator" Released: September 2011; 3. "Leaving Home" Released: February 2012; 4. "Fallen Away" Released: June 2012

Vacation is the debut studio album by Australian indie pop duo Big Scary. It was released on 7 October 2011. The album debuted and peaked at number 37 on the ARIA Charts.

At the J Awards of 2011, the album was nominated for Australian Album of the Year.

== Background ==
Big Scary formed in 2006 by Tom Iansek and Joanna Syme, released seven extended plays between 2008 and 2010 and were a constant fixture on Triple J in these years. In July 2011, the duo released "Mixtape" followed by "Gladiator" in September 2011, alongside the album's announcement.

== Critical reception ==
Beat Magazine called Vacation "an immensely interesting album" highlighting "Falling Away" as the album highlight saying "simple yet evocative piano is driven by steady percussion, all of which is accentuated by dreamy vocals."

Melissa Holden from Purple Sneakers called "Leaving Home" as "the pinnacle of the album" saying "[it] is a beautiful ballad which exquisitely combines heartfelt lyrics, driving drums, a simple yet effective riff and a culminating climax which seems to fill the listener with an inexplicable sense of fullness. The last minute of the track is pure perfection, with a swooning synth, grungy guitar and emotive vocal." Holden said "The album is packed to the punch with hitting tracks that convince the listener to the musician's talent in both songwriting and instrumentation. If you haven't already bought the album, I fully insist you go out there and support this Melbourne duo, you won't regret it."

Dom Alessio from Triple J said "What I love so much about Big Scary's debut is how diverse it is. They effortlessly go from White Stripes-esque rockers like 'Purple' to plaintive ballads like 'Bad Friends', and the record still manages to sound cohesive and unified. Vacation beautifully embodies the "less is more" philosophy of Big Scary's fantastic, minimalist pop music."

== Track listing ==
Vacation track listing
No.	Title	Writer(s)	Length
1.	"Gladiator"	Tom Iansek; Joanna Syme	3:07
2.	"Leaving Home"	Iansek; Syme	3:59
3.	"Mix Tape"	Iansek; Syme	3:35
4.	"Purple"	Iansek; Syme	3:34
5.	"Child in a Tree"	Iansek; Syme	3:39
6.	"Bad Friends"	Iansek; Syme	3:58
7.	"Got It, Lost It"	Iansek; Syme	4:24
8.	"Falling Away"	Iansek; Syme	4:06
9.	"Of Desire"	Iansek; Syme	3:27
10.	"Rolling By"	Iansek; Syme	2:37
Total length:			37:18

== Charts ==
Chart performance for Vacation
Chart (2011)	Peak position
Australian Albums (ARIA)	37

== Release history ==
Release history for Vacation
Country	Date	Format	Label	Catalogue
Australia	7 October 2011	CD; digital download; LP	Big Scary	BS04/BS05
Australia	2014	LP (re-release)	Pieater	PIE004LP
