= Kiss Me Like You're Leaving =

2025 single by Jem Cassar-Daley

Single by Jem Cassar-Daley
- Released: 2 May 2023
- Length: 3:40
- Label: Jem Cassar-Daley; Civilians
- Songwriters: Jem Cassar-Daley; Michael DeLorenzis; Jon Nite; Michael Paynter
- Producer: MSquared Productions

Jem Cassar-Daley singles chronology
"Big Container" (2024)	"Kiss Me Like You're Leaving" (2023)	"Tidal Wave" (2025)

"Kiss Me Like You're Leaving" is a song by Australian singer-songwriter Jem Cassar-Daley. The song was written by Cassar-Daley and MSquared Productions (Michael Paynter and Michael DeLorenzis) and Jon Nite. It was released on 2 May 2025.

Cassar-Daley told Women in Pop, "'Kiss Me Like You're Leaving' is all about wanting passion and urgency from your partner. Over time, it's so easy to grow complacent with each other and forget the little things that made you fall in love in the first place."

At the 2026 Queensland Music Awards, the song won Song of the Year and the Pop Award.

At the AIR Awards of 2026, it was nominated for Independent Song of the Year and Independent Music Video of the Year.

== Reception ==
The AU Review called the song "stellar" saying "Passionate vocals and a rich and lush production, has this one sparkling with diamonds."
