= National Indigenous Music Awards 2022 =

Edition of Australian music awards

- Date: 6 August 2022
- Venue: Darwin Amphitheatre, Northern Territory, Australia

Highlights
- Most wins: Baker Boy (2)
- Most nominations: Barkaa (4)
- Website: nima.musicnt.com.au

Television/radio coverage
- Network: National Indigenous Television

The National Indigenous Music Awards 2022 were the 19th annual National Indigenous Music Awards (NIMAs). The awards were announced on 12 May, nominations were revealed on 13 July and the winners presented on 6 August 2022.

NIMAs creative director Ben Graetz said he was proud of the night's proceedings. "To be at the Amphitheater with community, celebrating together in person will be something I will remember for a very long time."

== Performers ==
- Thelma Plum
- King Stingray
- Emma Donovan & the Putbacks and Fred Leone - "We Won't Cry"
- Birdz & Fred Leone
- Yirrmal
- Manuel Dhurrkay
- Bumpy
- J-MILLA and the Red Flag Dancers.

== Hall of Fame inductee ==
- Gurrumul

== Triple J Unearthed National Indigenous Winner ==
- Bumpy

== Archie Roach Foundation Award ==
- Dobby

== Awards ==
The nominations was revealed on 13 July 2022. Winners indicated in boldface, with other nominees in plain.

Artist of the Year

Artist	Result
**Baker Boy**	Won
Electric Fields	Nominated
Jessica Mauboy	Nominated
The Kid Laroi	Nominated
King Stingray	Nominated
Thelma Plum	Nominated

New Talent of the Year

Artist	Result
Barkaa	Nominated
Dameeeela	Nominated
Dobby	Nominated
**Jem Cassar-Daley**	Won
Lil Kootsie	Nominated
Tilly Tjala Thomas	Nominated

Album of the Year

Artist and album	Result
Archie Roach – My Songs: 1989–2021	Nominated
**Baker Boy – Gela**	Won
Birdz – Legacy	Nominated
Dallas Woods – Julie's Boy	Nominated
Emma Donovan & The Putbacks – Under These Streets	Nominated
Jem Cassar-Daley – I Don't Know Who to Call	Nominated

Film Clip of the Year

Artist and song	Result
Baker Boy – "My Mind"	Nominated
Barkaa – "Blak Matriarchy"	Nominated
**Barkaa – "King Brown"** (Directed & Produced by: Sonder Films Executive Producer)	Won
Jessica Mauboy – "Automatic"	Nominated
Tasman Keith – "Love Too Soon"	Nominated

Song of the Year

Artist and song	Result
Barkaa – "King Brown"	Nominated
**King Stingray – "Milkumana"**	Won
Miiesha – "Made for Silence"	Nominated
Mo'Ju – "Sometime"	Nominated
Thelma Plum – "Backseat of My Mind"	Nominated
Xavier Rudd featuring J-Milla – "Ball and Chain"	Nominated

Community Clip of the Year

Artist and song	Result
Desert Pea Media (Gumbaynggirr Collective) – "Through the Smoke "	Nominated
Desert Pea Media (Koori Mob) – "Our Country, Our Life"	Nominated
Indigenous Outreach Project (Ballarat, VIC) - "Don't Give Up On Yourself"	Nominated
Indigenous Outreach Project (Doomadgee, QLD) - "Where We Wanna Be"	Nominated
**Indigenous Outreach Project (Numbulwar, NT) - "Loud & Proud"**	Won
