= I Don't Know Who to Call =

EP by Jem Cassar-Daley
- Released: 27 May 2022
- Length: 26:46
- Label: Jem Cassar-Daley
- Producers: Jem Cassar-Daley; James Angus; Tom Eggert; Garret Kato

Jem Cassar-Daley chronology
I Don't Know Who to Call (2022)	Tattoos Used to Come Off in the Pool (2026)

Singles from I Don't Know Who to Call
- 1. "Letting Go" Released: 23 July 2021; 2. "Changes" Released: 22 October 2021; 3. "Like it More" Released: 18 March 2022; 4. "Oh No" Released: 20 May 2022

I Don't Know Who to Call is the debut extended play (EP) by Australian singer-songwriter Jem Cassar-Daley. The EP was released in May 2022.

Upon release Cassar-Daley said "Being my first project, (the EP) is full of all of the people and places that've shaped me as a person". The cover art is of her Grandma Dell's verandah.

In August 2022, Cassar-Daley released a mini documentary of the same name, where she takes listeners behind the scenes, explaining the origins of the EP and performing stripped-back versions of some of the songs.

At the National Indigenous Music Awards 2022, it was nominated for Album of the Year. At the AIR Awards of 2023 it was nominated for Best Independent Pop Album or EP.

== Reception ==
August Billy from Music Feeds said "Working with various co-writers allowed Cassar-Daley to imbue the record with a degree of stylistic fluidity, incorporating pop songs alongside singer-songwriter ballads and shades of soul, country and soft rock."

== Track listing ==
No.	Title	Writer(s)	Length
1.	"Changes"	Cassar-Daley, James Angus, Brook Toia	3:23
2.	"Standing Still"	Cassar-Daley, Jen Boyce	4:57
3.	"Letting Go"	Cassar-Daley, Garret Kato	4:01
4.	"Oh No"	Cassar-Daley, Ali Barter, Tom Eggert	2:10
5.	"By the Sea"	Cassar-Daley	4:16
6.	"Like It More"	Cassar-Daley, Tia Gostelow	3:01
7.	"I Just Don't Think I'll Ever Get Over You"	Colin Hay	4:55
Total length:			26:46
