= A Postcard from an Australian Summer =

EP by Ziggy Alberts
- Released: 26 July 2019
- Label: CommonFolk Records

Ziggy Alberts chronology
Laps Around the Sun (2018)	A Postcard from an Australian Summer (2019)	Truly Acoustic (2020)

A Postcard from an Australian Summer is the live extended play (EP) by Australian singer songwriter Ziggy Alberts. The EP was recorded during his 2019 World Tour and released in July 2019.

Upon released, Alberts said "A Postcard from an Australian Summer is a celebration... We share something pretty special, me and you; I think we do a pretty great job at closing the gap between the crowd and stage." adding "It's hard to describe these moments we have at my live shows: I might be biased, but I think its a really unique experience – so I made this postcard to celebrate just that."

== Reception ==
Professional ratings
Review scores
Source	Rating
Forte Magazine	4.5/5 stars

Tammy Walters from Forte Magazine said "Pure and wholesome goodness for the soul, A Postcard from an Australian Summer is a thank you letter from Ziggy Alberts to his fans" saying "the only downfall of this live EP - [is that] it wasn't long enough."

== Track listing ==
No.	Title	Length
1.	"You (A Song for Koda)"	4:29
2.	"Interlude"	2:06
3.	"Heaven"	2:58
4.	"Love Me Now"	4:15
5.	"Gone (The Pocahontas Song)"	5:46

== Release history ==
Region	Date	Format	Label
Australia	26 July 2019	digital download; streaming	CommonFolk Records
