= Laps Around the Sun (Ziggy Alberts album) =

Studio album by Ziggy Alberts
- Released: 9 November 2018
- Length: 34:10
- Label: CommonFolk Records
- Producers: Ziggy Alberts, Garrett Kato

Ziggy Alberts chronology
Four Feet in the Forest (2016)	Laps Around the Sun (2018)	A Postcard from an Australian Summer (2019)

Singles from Laps Around the Sun
- 1. "Heaven" Released: 15 September 2017; 2. "Love Me Now" Released: 18 May 2018; 3. "Laps Around the Sun" Released: 3 August 2018; 4. "Stronger" Released: 28 September 2018; 5. "Yu (A Song for Koda)" Released: 9 November 2018; 6. "On Hold" Released: 8 December 2018; 7. "Bright Lights" Released: 7 February 2019

Laps Around the Sun is the third studio album by Australian singer songwriter Ziggy Alberts. The album was released in November 2018 and peaked at number 9 on the ARIA Charts, becoming Albert's first charting album.

The album was written over four years and tell the story of coming out of one relationship and into a much healthier one and mostly written about an imaginary character named Koda. Alberts told Triple J, "I wanted to write about the qualities I most wanted to practice but also the qualities I most wanted in a relationship with someone else. It's how I found hope, how I found answers for myself in times of deep questioning." Alberts told Billboard "This is the first time I looked at a whole catalog of songs and picked ones I felt told a story".

The album was supported by a 30-date, 3 month 2018 Australian tour. A 2019 tour was later announced.

== Reception ==
Professional ratings
Review scores
Source	Rating
Forte Magazine	4.5/5 stars

Tammy Walters from Forte Magazine said "Alberts' buttery voice glides atop of an acoustic guitar or piano for the majority of the songs, marinating the accompaniments and elevating the emotion behind the lyrics." adding "Laps Around the Sun is simplistic, not to be confused with simple. Alberts purposefully accompanies his deep lyrics with silky, moody vocal lines and the appropriate backing arrangements to let the songs speak for themselves; a gift for your ears and soul."

== Track listing ==
No.	Title	Length
1.	"Love Me Now"	4:03
2.	"On Hold"	3:09
3.	"Laps Around the Sun"	3:26
4.	"Best Friend"	3:37
5.	"3 Degrees South"	3:14
6.	"Bright Lights"	3:37
7.	"Stronger"	3:11
8.	"Worn Out"	3:49
9.	"Heaven"	2:40
10.	"Yu (A Song for Koda)"	3:24
Total length:		34:10

== Charts ==
=== Weekly charts ===
Chart (2018–19)	Peak position
Australian Albums (ARIA)	9

=== Year-end charts ===
Chart (2019)	Position
Australian Albums (ARIA)	47

== Certifications ==
Region	Certification	Certified units/sales
Australia (ARIA)	2× Platinum	140,000^{‡}
^{‡} Sales+streaming figures based on certification alone.

== Release history ==
Region	Date	Format	Label	Catalogue
Australia	9 November 2018	CD; digital download; streaming; Vinyl LP	CommonFolk Records	CMNFOLK001CD /CMNFLK001LP
