= Searching for Freedom =

Studio album by Ziggy Alberts
- Released: 19 March 2021
- Length: 47:23
- Label: CommonFolk Records
- Producer: Paulie Bromley

Ziggy Alberts chronology
Truly Acoustic (2020)	Searching for Freedom (2021)

Singles from Searching for Freedom
- 1. "Together" Released: 24 January 2020; 2. "Don't Get Caught Up" Released: 24 June 2020; 3. "Heartbeat" Released: 13 November 2020; 4. "Letting Go" Released: 20 January 2021

Searching for Freedom is the fourth studio album by Australian singer songwriter Ziggy Alberts. The album was released in March 2021 and peaked at number 27 on the ARIA Charts.

At the 2021 ARIA Music Awards, the album was nominated for Best Blues and Roots Album.

== Background and release ==
Albert told scenestr work on the album started with "Together" which he wrote, recorded and released in January 2020 with the album coming together "over autumn, winter and spring 2020". On the topic of themes or issues, Alberts said "As per most of my songwriting, it is a combination of my personal journey and the observations I make of living and society along the way. This album, as per the title, dives deep into the topic of freedom and our search for it both inwards and out."

In an interview with Atwood, Alberts said "I hope this album helps encourage people to continue stepping out of fear and into love. I hope it encourages them to continue on their path of freedom. There is so much I've learnt from this process but frankly it has been such a whirlwind I haven't reflected upon it yet. I plan to soon."

The album was announced on 13 November 2020 alongside single "Heartbeat".

== Reception ==
Professional ratings
Review scores
Source	Rating
Clunk Magazine	4.5/5 stars

Jason Scott from American Songwriter said "Ziggy Alberts bares his heart and soul on searching for freedom. 12 songs and 12 stories, the musician and songwriter is at his most honest, probing the darkest parts of himself as a way to cleanse, heal, and move forward."

Mitch Mosk from Atwood Magazine called the album "calm, inclusive and warm" saying "[it's] a record whose powerful messages of sustainability, peace, justice, and understanding are sure to resonate with all who listen."

Luke James from Clunk Magazine said "The change in tones and use of different instruments throughout Searching for Freedom keeps the album interesting and is one of those albums you could put your headphones on at the beach and feel the tide come and go. Ziggy Alberts is clearly talented and each song feels unique which is where a lot of singer-songwriters trip up."

== Track listing ==
No.	Title	Writer(s)	Producer(s)	Length
1.	"Keeper"	Alberts	Paulie Bromley	2:38
2.	"Together"	Alberts	Bromley	4:03
3.	"Don't Get Caught Up"	Alberts	Bromley	3:39
4.	"Letting Go"	Alberts	Bromley	4:27
5.	"Heartbeat"	Alberts	Bromley	4:32
6.	"Chocolate"	Alberts	Bromley	4:27
7.	"Holding You"	Alberts	Bromley	3:19
8.	"Chemistry"	Alberts	Bromley	4:20
9.	"Getting Low"	Alberts	Bromley	4:55
10.	"Circus"	Alberts	Bromley, Theo Aronson	3:49
11.	"Feeling You"	Alberts	Bromley	3:07
12.	"Searching for Freedom"	Alberts	Bromley	4:07
Total length:				47:23

== Charts ==
Chart (2021)	Peak position
Australian Albums (ARIA)	27

== Release history ==
Region	Date	Format	Label	Catalogue
Australia	19 March 2021	digital download; streaming	CommonFolk Records	CMNFOLK011
Australia	21 May 2021	CD; Vinyl LP	CommonFolk Records	CMNFOLK011CD /CMNFOLK011LP
