= Music Victoria Awards of 2020 =

Annual Australian music awards ceremony

- Date: 9 December 2020
- Hosted by: Lyndelle Wilkinson and Chris Gill

Highlights
- Most wins: Sampa the Great (4)
- Most nominations: Sampa the Great (8)

Television/radio coverage
- Network: PBS 106.7FM, 3RRR & Channel 31

The Music Victoria Awards of 2020 are the 15th Annual Music Victoria Awards and consist of a series of awards, presented on 8 December 2020. For the first time, an Outstanding Woman in Music Award and Best Producer Award will be awarded.

== Hall of Fame inductees ==
- Mary Mihelakos and Chris Wilson

Mary Mihelakos has worked across the entire spectrum of the industry – running her own PR company, booking a wide range of venues, being music editor of Beat, the Sticky Carpet columnist for The Age and running the Music Victoria Awards for a number of years. Mihelakos mortgaged her home to co-deliver the first Aussie BBQ showcases at SXSW – an initiative now adopted for industry events around the world to spotlight Australian acts.

Chris Wilson is a blues singer, harmonica player, guitarist and saxophonist. After his beginnings in Sole Twister, Harem Scarem and Paul Kelly and The Coloured Girls, Chris Wilson went on to front his bands as Crown of Thorns and released a series of acclaimed albums. Wilson died on 16 January 2019, aged 63, after a battle with pancreatic cancer.

== Award nominees and winners ==
=== General awards ===
Voted on by the public. Winners indicated in boldface, with other nominees in plain.

| Best Victorian Album | Best Victorian Song |
|---|---|
| **Sampa the Great – The Return**; Cable Ties – Far Enough; Elizabeth – The Wonderful World of Nature; Rolling Blackouts Coastal Fever – Sideways to New Italy; RVG – Feral | **Sampa the Great – "OMG"**; Baker Boy – "Move"; Leah Senior – "Evergreen"; Mildlife – "Rare Air"; RVG – "I Used to Love You" |
| Best Band | Best Breakthrough Act |
| **Amyl and the Sniffers**; Cable Ties; King Gizzard & the Lizard Wizard; Rolling Blackouts Coastal Fever; RVG | **Pinch Points**; Alice Skye; Elizabeth; Grace Cummings; Nat Vazer |
| Best Musician | Best Solo Artist |
| **Amy Taylor (Amyl and The Sniffers)**; Erica Dunn (Tropical Fuck Storm, Palm Springs, Mod Con); Gareth Liddiard (Tropical Fuck Storm); Gordon Koang; Jen Cloher (Dyson Stringer Cloher); Romy Vager (RVG); Sampa Tembo (Sampa The Great); SilentJay (Sampa The Great, Mandarin Dreams); Stu Mackenzie (King Gizzard & the Lizard Wizard); Tom Iansek (Big Scary, #1 Dads) | **Sampa the Great**; Angie McMahon; Baker Boy; Briggs; Courtney Barnett; Elizabeth; Gordon Koang; Leah Senior; Simona Castricum; Sui Zhen |
| Best Live Act | |
**Amyl and The Sniffers**; Cable Ties; Gordon Koang; Sampa The Great; The Teskey Brothers

=== Genre Specific Awards ===
Voted by a select industry panel

| Best Blues Album | Best Country Album |
|---|---|
| **Lloyd Spiegel – Cut and Run**; Aaron Pollock – Separated Through Time; Charlie Bedford – Good to Go; Joey Vincent's Bakelite Radio – Rosary of Tears; The Teskey Brothers – Live at The Forum | **Tracy McNeil & The GoodLife – You Be the Lightning**; The Cartwheels – Self-titled; Lost Ragas– This Is Not a Dream; Michael Waugh – The Weir; Mitch Dean – Holding Back the Levee |
| Best Electronic Act | Best Experimental/Avant-Garde Act |
| **Sleep D**; DRMNGNOW; OK EG; Pugilist; Simona Castricum | Robin Fox; Bridget Chappell; James Rushford; Maria Moles; Natasha Anderson |
| Best Folk or Roots Album | Best Heavy Album |
| **Fiona Ross & Shane O'Mara – Sunwise Turn**; Charm of Finches – Your Company; Liz Frencham – Love and Other Crimes; Louisa Wise – All of These Things; Ruth Hazleton – Daisywheel | **Diploid – Glorify**; Carcinoid – Metastatic Declination; Dead – Raving Drooling; Internal Rot – Grieving Birth; Sithlord – From Out of the Darkness |
| Best Hip Hop Act | Best Intercultural Act |
| **Birdz**; DRMNGNOW; Jordan Dennis; Nomad; Sampa The Great | **Black Jesus Experience**; Amaru Tribe; Gelareh Pour's Garden; No Borders Music; Sampa The Great |
| Best Jazz Album | Best Reggae or Dance Hall Act |
| **Vanessa Perica Orchestra – Love is a Temporary Madness**; Andrea Keller - Life Is Brut[if]al; Horns of Leroy – Big Night; JK Group – The Young Ones; ZEDSIX – The Shape of Jazz | **Dub FX**; Jah Tung; Marvin Priest; Monkey Marc; The Push Reggae Band |
| Best Rock/Punk Album | Best Soul, Funk, R'n'B and Gospel Album |
| **Cable Ties – Far Enough**; Nuada – Beneath the Swamp; Pseudo Mind Hive – Of Seers and Sirens; RVG – Feral; Shepparton Airplane – Sharks | **Sampa The Great – The Return**; Karate Boogaloo – Carn the Boogers; Surprise Chef – All News Is Good News; The Teskey Brothers – Live at The Forum; Various Artists – Over Under Away Volume 1: 10 Years of Hopestreet Recordings |

=== Other Awards ===
Voted by a select industry panel

| Best Small Venue (under 500 capacity) | Best Large Venue (Over 500 capacity) |
|---|---|
| **The Gasometer Hotel, Collingwood**; Howler, Brunswick; Northcote Social Club, Northcote; The Tote Hotel, Collingwood; The Old Bar, Fitzroy | **Forum Theatre, Melbourne**; Melbourne Recital Centre, Southbank; Corner Hotel, Richmond; The Night Cat, Fitzroy; Hamer Hall, Melbourne |
| Best Regional/Outer Suburban Venue (Over 50 Gigs a Year) | Best Regional/Outer Suburban Venue (Under 50 Gigs a Year) |
| **Barwon Club Hotel – Geelong**; The Bridge Hotel – Castlemaine; The Eastern – Ballarat; Torquay Hotel – Torquay; Sooki Lounge – Belgrave | **Theatre Royal – Castlemaine**; The Blues Train – Queenscliff; The Sound Doctor Presents – Anglesea; Volta – Ballarat; Daylesford Cider – Daylesford |
| Best Regional/Outer Suburban Act | Best Festival |
| **The Teskey Brothers (Warrandyte)**; Benny Walker (Echuca); Bones and Jones (Geelong); Freya Josephine Hollick (Ballarat); The Kite Machine (Geelong West) | **Golden Plains Festival**; Brunswick Music Festival; Isol-Aid; Melbourne Music Week; Queenscliff Music Festival |
| Best Producer | Outstanding Woman in Music |
| **Joelistics for Mo'Ju & Joelistics Ghost Town (EP)**; Annika Schmarsel aka Alice Ivy: Sunrise', "Don't Sleep", "Better Man" (singles); Anna Laverty: Milk on Milk (Milk! Records compilation); Damien Charles: Coda Chroma Inside the Still Life (Album); Tom Iansek: #1 Dads – Golden Repair (Album) | **Sarah Hamilton (One of One)**; Anna Laverty (Music Producer); Charlotte Abroms (Support Act Fundraiser, Music Management); Coco Eke (Bad Apples, Barpirdhila Foundation and Ngarrimili); Emily Ulman (Isol-Aid, Brunswick Music Festival) |
The Archie Roach Foundation Award for Emerging Talent
**Kee'ahn**; Alice Skye; Allara; The Merindas; River Boy
