= Jem Cassar-Daley =

Australian musician

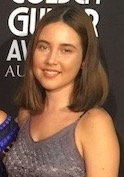
- Cassar-Daley in 2017

Background information
- Born: 14 February 2001 (age 25); Australia
- Origin: Brisbane, Queensland, Australia
- Genre: Indie pop
- Occupations: Singer; songwriter
- Instruments: Vocals; keyboards
- Years active: 2021–present
- Parents: Troy Cassar-Daley (father); Laurel Edwards (mother)

Jem Cassar-Daley (born 14 February 2001) is an Australian indie pop singer and songwriter. She is the daughter of country music singer Troy Cassar-Daley and TV presenter Laurel Edwards. She has been nominated for many awards and won several, including, most recently, Song of the Year at the 2026 Queensland Music Awards, with "Kiss Me Like You're Leaving". Her debut album, Tattoos Used to Come Off in the Pool, was released in August 2026.

== Early life and education ==
Jem Cassar-Daley was born on 14 February 2001. Her parents are Laurel Edwards, a television presenter, radio announcer, and singer, and Troy Cassar-Daley, a country music singer-songwriter and musician. She is of Maltese, European Australian, and Gumbaynggirr and Bundjalung descent, and has a brother, Clay. Music was a bit part of the children's upbringing, with the whole family singing together, and with Troy bringing the children on stage to sing at the Tamworth Country Music Festival.

Cassar-Daley participated in musical theatre while at high school, gaining confidence through it. After graduating from high school in 2018, she enrolled in a BA degree, but her parents persuaded her to focus on music. She went on her first tour with her father, playing 70 dates in a year.

== Career ==
=== 2021–2026: I Don't Know Who to Call ===
Cassar-Daley released her debut single "Letting Go" in July 2021. Her seven-track debut extended play, I Don't Know Who to Call, was released in May 2022. It includes previous singles "Letting Go", "Changes", "Like it More", and "Oh No". In September of that year, the artist issued a mini-documentary of the same name to explain the origins of the EP's tracks. She worked on this project with James Angus, Ali Barter, Jen Boyce, Tom Eggert and Tia Gostelow.

At the 2022 Queensland Music Awards, Cassar-Daley joined her father on stage to perform a cover of Brisbane band Mop and The Dropouts' 1982 anthem "Brisbane Blacks" in honour of the band receiving a Lifetime Achievement Award.

In November 2024, Cassar-Daley joined King Stingray for a cover of Royel Otis' "Oysters in My Pocket" for Triple j's Like a Version. The cover was released as a single on streaming services in December 2024.

=== 2026: Tattoos Used to Come Off in the Pool ===
In 2026, Cassar-Daley supported Vera Blue on her tour of Australia, played at BIGSOUND in Brisbane, and shared a stage with Paul Kelly.

Cassar-Daley's debut album Tattoos Used to Come Off in the Pool was released on 28 August 2026. The title relates to her first tattoo of a wattle flower, which she had done on her forearm aged 21 after her grandmother died.

Her Australian tour with the album includes Adelaide and Brisbane in September 2026. In November 2026, Cassar-Daley featured with Jessica Mauboy on Ruby Rodgers' single "For You".

== Style and influences ==
Cassar-Daley's musical style has been described as indie pop. She calls it "a mix of a few different things". She says that her early influences included a wide variety of styles, including rock and (her mother's favourite) "yacht rock". She said in 2022 that she had been "sung to in the womb" and that The Sound of White by Missy Higgins was the first album she bought, and she still loved Higgins. She was also inspired by Gwen Stefani, Beyoncé, and Fergie, and was a fan of One Direction. Other musical influences include Joni Mitchell and Fleetwood Mac. She has also been a fan of Vera Blue since she was a teen.

== Discography ==
=== Studio albums ===
List of albums, with selected details
| Title | Details | Peak chart positions |
| Title | Details | AUS |
|---|---|---|
| Tattoos Used to Come Off in the Pool | Released: 28 August 2026; Format: Digital, CD; Label: Jem Cassar-Daley, Civilians (CVCD165) | 18 |

=== Extended plays ===
List of albums, with selected details
| Title | Details |
|---|---|
| I Don't Know Who to Call | Released: 27 May 2022; Format: Digital; Label: Jem Cassar-Daley |

== Awards and nominations ==
=== AIR Awards ===
The Australian Independent Record Awards (commonly known informally as AIR Awards) is an annual awards night to recognise, promote and celebrate the success of Australia's Independent Music sector.

| Year | Nominee / work | Award | Result | Ref. |
|---|---|---|---|---|
| 2023 | Jem Cassar-Daley | Breakthrough Independent Artist of the Year | Nominated | |
| 2023 | I Don't Know Who to Call | Best Independent Pop Album or EP | Nominated | |
| 2024 | "King of Disappointment" | Independent Song of the Year | Won | |
| 2025 | "Big Container" | Independent Song of the Year | Nominated | |
| 2026 | "Kiss Me Like You're Leaving" | Independent Song of the Year | Nominated | |
| 2026 | Tas Wilson and James Adams for "Kiss Me Like You're Leaving" | Independent Music Video of the Year | Nominated | |

=== APRA Music Awards ===
The APRA Music Awards were established by Australasian Performing Right Association (APRA) in 1982 to honour the achievements of songwriters and music composers, and to recognise their song writing skills, sales and airplay performance, by its members annually.

| Year | Nominee / work | Award | Result | Ref. |
|---|---|---|---|---|
| 2025 | Jem Cassar-Daley | Emerging Songwriter of the Year | Nominated | |

=== Australian Women in Music Awards ===
The Australian Women in Music Awards is an annual event that celebrates outstanding women in the Australian Music Industry who have made significant and lasting contributions in their chosen field. They commenced in 2018.

| Year | Nominee / work | Award | Result | Ref. |
|---|---|---|---|---|
| 2023 | Jem Cassar-Daley | Emerging Artist Award | Nominated | |

=== National Indigenous Music Awards ===
The National Indigenous Music Awards is an annual awards ceremony that recognises the achievements of Indigenous Australians in music. The award ceremony commenced in 2004. Electric Fields have won one award from four nominations.

| Year | Nominee / work | Award | Result | Ref. |
|---|---|---|---|---|
| 2022 | Jem Cassar-Daley | New Talent of the Year | Won | |
| 2022 | I Don't Know Who to Call | Album of the Year | Nominated | |
| 2025 | "Kiss Me Like You're Leaving" | Song of the Year | Nominated | |
| 2026 | Jem Cassar-Daley | Artist of the Year | Nominated | |
| 2026 | "Front Left Pocket" | Song of the Year | Nominated | |

=== Queensland Music Awards ===
The Queensland Music Awards (previously known as Q Song Awards) are annual awards celebrating Queensland, Australia's brightest emerging artists and established legends. They commenced in 2006.

| Year | Nominee / work | Award | Result (wins only) | Ref. |
|---|---|---|---|---|
| 2022 | Letting Go" | Indigenous Award | Won | |
| 2024 | "King of Disappointment" | Song of the Year | Won | |
| 2024 | "King of Disappointment" | Pop Award | Won | |
| 2025 | "Big Container" | Indigenous Award | Won | |
| 2026 | "Kiss Me Like You're Leaving" | Song of the Year | Won | |
| 2026 | "Kiss Me Like You're Leaving" | Pop Award | Won | |
