= Andy Golledge =

Australian singer-songwriter

- Born: Australia
- Origin: Sydney, Australia
- Genre: Alternative country
- Occupation: Singer-songwriter
- Instrument: vocals
- Years active: 2010–present
- Label: I OH YOU
- Website: www.andygolledge.com.au

Andy Golledge is an Australian country music singer and songwriter. He released his debut studio album, Strength of a Queen on 4 March 2022. For Golledge said Strength of a Queen is ultimately a journey saying "It's a search for somebody that loves you for who you are, and who you want to be, and ultimately sharing that journey together. It's about finding the strength of a queen within you and within another."

In August 2023, Golledge released "Country Band".

In January 2024, Andy Golledge announced Young, Dumb & Wild will be released on 19 April 2024.

== Discography ==
=== Albums ===
List of albums, with Australian chart positions
Title	Album details	Peak chart positions
Title	Album details	AUS
Strength of a Queen	Released: 4 March 2022; Label: I OH YOU; Format: CD, LP, digital download, streaming	— (Note: Strength of a Queen did not enter the top 100 ARIA Album Charts, but peaked at number 6 on the Australian Independent Label Album chart. and number 13 on the ARIA Country Albums Chart.)
Young, Dumb & Wild	Released: 19 April 2024; Label: I OH YOU; Format: CD, LP, digital download, streaming	— (Note: Young, Dumb & Wild did not enter the top 100 ARIA Album Charts, but peaked at number 6 on the Australian Independent Label Album chart. and number 30 on the ARIA Country Albums Chart.)

=== Extended plays ===
Title	EP details
Live	Released: 17 April 2010; Label: OrGasm Records; Format: CD, digital download
Namoi	Released: 7 February 2020; Label: I OH YOU; Format: CD, digital download, streaming

== Awards and nominations ==
=== ARIA Music Awards ===
The ARIA Music Awards is an annual ceremony presented by Australian Recording Industry Association (ARIA), which recognise excellence, innovation, and achievement across all genres of the music of Australia. They commenced in 1987.

Year	Nominee / work	Award	Result	Ref.
2022	Strength of a Queen	Best Country Album	Nominated	

=== AIR Awards ===
The Australian Independent Record Awards (known colloquially as the AIR Awards) is an annual awards night to recognise, promote and celebrate the success of Australia's Independent Music sector.

Year	Nominee / work	Award	Result	Ref.
2021	Namoi	Best Independent Country Album or EP	Nominated	
2023	Andy Golledge	Breakthrough Independent Artist of the Year	Nominated	
2023	Strength of a Queen	Best Independent Country Album or EP	Won	

=== Country Music Awards of Australia ===
The Country Music Awards of Australia is an annual awards night held in January during the Tamworth Country Music Festival. Celebrating recording excellence in the Australian country music industry. They commenced in 1973.

Year	Nominee / work	Award	Result	Ref.
2023	Strength of a Queen	Alt. Country Album of the Year	Nominated	
2025	Young Dumb & Wild	Album of the Year	Pending	
2025	Young Dumb & Wild	Alt. Country Album of the Year	Pending	

=== National Live Music Awards ===
The National Live Music Awards (NLMAs) commenced in 2016 to recognise contributions to the live music industry in Australia.

Year	Nominee / work	Award	Result	Ref.
2023	Andy Golledge	Best Live Voice in NSW	Nominated	
