= Mo'Ju =

Australian musician

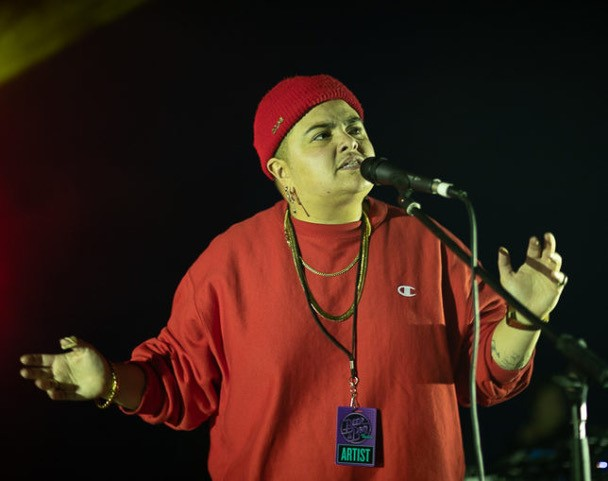
- Mo'Ju performing

Background information
- Born: 1983 (age 42–43); New South Wales, Australia
- Origin: Melbourne, Australia
- Occupations: Singer/songwriter, musician
- Years active: 2006–present
- Label: ABC Music
- Members: Stevie 'T-Bone' Ruiz de Luzuriaga (Drums & Co-writer, also Mojo's younger brother)
- Past members: Yeo Choong (keytar, bass guitar & bass synth), Henry Jenkins (bass guitar) Lewis Coleman (keyboards) Hudson Whitlock (drums) Darcy McNulty (saxophone) Philip Smiley (drums) Damian Fitzgerald (drums)
- Website: mojumusic.com

Mojo Ruiz de Luzuriaga, known professionally as Mo'Ju and previously as Mojo Juju, is an Australian musician, best known for their 2018 album Native Tongue and the lead single of the same title. The single won the Best Independent Single category in the 2019 AIR Awards. They play guitar and piano, write songs and sing, and have created music in a number of genres.

Mo'Ju has toured with international performers and their music has been featured in a number of television shows. Their identity is a matter of pride and they have spoken publicly and through their music about being Wiradjuri, Filipino and queer.

== Early life ==
Mojo Ruiz de Luzuriaga was born in regional New South Wales. Their father is Filipino, from Bacolod City, Negros and their mother is mixed race, of Wiradjuri and European heritage. Their family moved around the region when they were a young child due to their Father's work, but their grandparents lived in Dubbo where they attended high school. They have spoken openly about feeling like an outsider through their childhood and how this laid the grounds for their exploration of cultural identity in their work. Their father speaks, but did not teach them, Spanish, Ilonggo or Tagalog language.

Mojo grew up around music with a number of musicians in their mother's family. They had a few piano lessons before starting to play the guitar aged eight.

In a 2019 interview with SBS TV's The Feed Mo'ju said: "Traditions are really important and family histories give you an insight into your own identity. Songwriting is a huge part of keeping those oral traditions alive."

== Career ==
Mo'ju has toured with international performers Tony Joe White, Rufus Wainwright, Aloe Blacc and Australian artists including Hilltop Hoods, Paul Kelly and Kira Puru.

Mo'ju has performed live shows with artists such as Hiatus Kaiyote, Ella Hooper, Kaiit, Sampa The Great and Emma Donovan.

Their music has been featured in a number of television shows including Underbelly: Razor, Underbelly: Squizzy, Roadtrip Nation and Total Control.

Mo'ju was interviewed in the documentary film Her Sound, Her Story, along with a large number of high profile women in the Australian music industry.

=== 2006–2010: Mojo Juju & The Snake Oil Merchants ===
Between 2006 and 2010, Mojo fronted a band called Mojo Juju & The Snake Oil Merchants. The band released two independent albums, Mojo Juju & The Snake Oil Merchants (2007) and Sellin' You Salvation (2009) before splitting.

A compilation of earlier material, Mojo Juju & The Snake Oil Merchants – Anthology, was released in 2015 on European label Off-Label Records. to coincide with the release of German film Bestefreunde, whose soundtrack was composed entirely of songs from the band's back catalogue.

=== 2012–2015: Going solo ===
In January 2012, Ruiz de Luzuriaga released their eponymous (performing as Mojo Juju at the time) debut solo album on ABC Music. It featured the singles "Horse Named Regret" and "Must Be Desire", and was in a blues style, featuring a lot of guitar.

In April 2015, they released their second solo studio album Seeing Red/Feeling Blue, an album with more pop elements than the first, but touching on a range of genres. They used the piano to write it, and, wanting to develop a new sound, collaborated with their friend Ptero Stylus, who had been working with hip hop duo Diafrix, as well as musicians from soul acts the Putbacks and the Cactus Channel. It features the singles "A Heart Is Not a Yo-Yo" and "They Come and They Go".

On 30 May 2015 Juju performed at Vivid Live with the Melbourne Ska Orchestra at the Sydney Opera House.

=== 2018-2019: Native Tongue ===
In August 2018, Mo'ju's third studio album Native Tongue was released, after four years in the making. The album explored their family history, identity and race politics.

They have spoken of the highly personal nature of the album and the single, saying they were about “allowing yourself to own all those different parts of who you are”. Responding to criticism by right-wing commentator Andrew Bolt, who described the title track of the album as a complaint, Mo'ju said that it was in fact an “expression of some complex emotions, such as grief for a loss of culture and Indigenous languages and other impacts of assimilation, colonisation and the white-washing of non-western cultures. This is not a song of self-pity, [but rather]...a song of self-empowerment”.

The Pasefika Vitoria Choir feature on the title track, which is produced by Malaysian-Australian hip hop artist Joelistics; other artists on the album include Lay the Mystic, Mirrah, and Joshua Tavares. Mo'ju's brother, Steve "T-Bone" Ruiz de Luzuriaga, and Melbourne-based producer and musician Yeo, were the backing musicians on the track.

Mo'ju said that performing this new material "reignited their passion and purpose for music", but has also spoken out about the way women of colour and other diverse artists have been subject to tokenism in the industry.

=== 2019-2020: Ghost Town ===
Chicago Tribune listed Mo'ju (then Mojo Juju) as one of the top 12 acts to showcase at SXSW in 2019.

In May 2019 Mo'ju appeared as a featured artist on the single "Black Child" by Birdz.

In June 2019 Mo'ju joined A.B. Original as a guest vocalist for their live performance on the SummerStage in Central Park in New York.

In November 2019, Mo'ju released the collaborative EP Ghost Town with Joelistics.

=== 2021: O.K. ===
On 17 September 2021, Mo'ju released "Wave", the lead single from the forthcoming EP OK, scheduled for released in November 2021. In a statement Mo'ju said "These are sad songs but they were also part of a healing process. Music is pretty special like that and I am extremely grateful to have the tools to express myself and process my feelings through a creative practice."

=== 2022-present: Oro, Plata, Mata ===
In November 2022, Mo'ju released "Change Has to Come", the lead single from their fourth studio album, scheduled for released in March 2023. Oro, Plata, Mata was announced in January, alongside single "Money".

== Personal life ==
Mo'ju uses they/them pronouns. They stated that they have a "complex gender identity".

== Discography ==
=== Albums ===
List of albums, with selected chart positions
Title	Album details	Peak chart positions
Title	Album details	AUS
Mojo Juju	Released: January 2012; Label: ABC Music; Formats: Vinyl LP, CD, digital	-
Seeing Red/Feeling Blue	Released: 17 April 2015; Label: ABC Music; Formats: Vinyl LP, CD, digital	-
Native Tongue	Released: 24 August 2018; Label: ABC Music; Formats: Vinyl LP, CD, digital	76
Oro, Plata, Mata	Scheduled: 24 March 2023; Label: Moju; Formats: digital	-
Double J, Live at the Wireless (with Melbourne Symphony Orchestra)	Scheduled: 26 September 2025; Label: ABC Music; Formats: 2×CD, digital	-

=== Extended plays ===
List of EPs
Title	Details
Ghost Town (with Joelistics)	Released: 25 November 2019; Label: Mojo Juju; Formats: digital, streaming
O.K.	Scheduled: 19 November 2021; Label: Mojo Juju; Formats: digital, streaming

=== Singles ===
==== As lead artist ====
Year	Title	Album
2011	"Horse Named Regret"	Mojo Juju
2012	"Must Be Desire"	Mojo Juju
2013	"Psycho"	non-album single
2014	"A Heart Is Not a Yo-Yo"	Seeing Red/Feeling Blue
2015	"They Come & They Go"	Seeing Red/Feeling Blue
2017	"Think Twice"	Native Tongue
2018	"Native Tongue"	Native Tongue
2019	"Leave It All Behind"	Ghost Town
2021	"Wave"	O.K.
2021	"Sometime"	O.K.
2022	"Money"	Oro, Plata, Mata
2023	"Change Has to Come"	Oro, Plata, Mata

== Awards and nominations ==
=== AIR Awards ===
The annual AIR Awards celebrate the success of Australian independent musicians.

Year	Nominee / work	Award	Result
2019	"Native Tongue"	Best Independent Single	Won

=== APRA Awards ===
The APRA Awards are presented annually from 1982 by the Australasian Performing Right Association (APRA), "honouring composers and songwriters".

Year	Nominee / work	Award	Result	Ref.
2019	"Native Tongue" (Mojo Juju / Joel Ma / Rita Seumanuta)	Urban Work of the Year	Nominated	
2019	"Native Tongue" (Mojo Juju / Joel Ma / Rita Seumanuta)	Song of the Year	Shortlisted	
2024	"Change Has to Come"	Most Performed R&B / Soul Work	Nominated	

=== ARIA Music Awards ===
The ARIA Music Awards is an annual award ceremony event celebrating the Australian music industry. Mojo Juju has been nominated for three awards.

Year	Nominee / work	Award	Result	Ref.
2018	Mojo Juju - Native Tongue	Best Urban Release	Nominated	
2018	Mojo Juju - Native Tongue	Breakthrough Artist	Nominated	
2018	"Native Tongue" (directed by Claudia Sangiorgi Dalimore)	Best Video	Nominated	
2023	Oro, Plata, Mata	Best Adult Contemporary Album	Nominated	
2026	Double J Live at the Wireless (with Nicholas Buc and Melbourne Symphony Orchestra)	Best World Music Album	Nominated	

=== Australian Music Prize ===
The Australian Music Prize (the AMP) is an annual award of $30,000 given to an Australian band or solo artist in recognition of the merit of an album released during the year of award. It exists to discover, reward and promote new Australian music of excellence.

Year	Nominee / work	Award	Result	Ref.
2023	Oro, Plata, Mata	Australian Music Prize	Nominated	

=== Australian Women in Music Awards ===
The Australian Women in Music Awards is an annual event that celebrates outstanding women in the Australian Music Industry who have made significant and lasting contributions in their chosen field. They commenced in 2018.

Year	Nominee / work	Award	Result	Ref.
2019\	Mojo Juju	Songwriter Award	Won	
2024	Mo'Ju	Songwriter Award	Nominated	
2024	Mo'Ju	Artistic Excellence Award	Won	

=== Environmental Music Prize ===
The Environmental Music Prize is a quest to find a theme song to inspire action on climate and conservation. It commenced in 2022.

Year	Nominee / work	Award	Result	Ref.
2023	"Change Has to Come"	Environmental Music Prize	Nominated	

=== J Awards ===
The J Awards are an annual series of Australian music awards that were established by the Australian Broadcasting Corporation's youth-focused radio station Triple J. They commenced in 2005.

Year	Nominee / work	Award	Result
2018	Themself	Double J Artist of the Year	Nominated
2018	"Native Tongue"	Australian Video of the Year	Won

=== Music Victoria Awards ===
The Music Victoria Awards (previously known as The Age EG Awards and The Age Music Victoria Awards) are an annual awards night celebrating Victorian music. They commenced in 2006.

Year	Nominee / work	Award	Result	Ref.
2015	Mo'Ju	Best Female Artist	Nominated	
2015	Seeing Red / Feeling Blue	Best Soul, Funk, R'n'B and Gospel Album	Nominated	
2018	Mo'Ju	Best Female Musician	Nominated	
2018	Mo'Ju	Best Solo Artist	Nominated	
2018	Mo'Ju	Best Global Act	Nominated	
2018	"Native Tongue"	Best Song	Nominated	
2020	Joelistics for Mo'Ju & Joelistics Ghost Town (EP)	Best Producer	Won	
2022	Mo'Ju	Best Solo Artist	Nominated	
2022	Mo'Ju	Soul, Funk, RNB & Gospel Work	Won	
2023	Mo'Ju	Soul, Funk, RNB & Gospel Work	Nominated	

=== National Dreamtime Awards ===
The National Dreamtime Awards are an annual celebration of Australian Aboriginal and Torres Strait Islander achievement in sport, arts, academia and community. Mojo Juju won the Female Music Artist Award in 2018.

Year	Nominee / work	Award	Result
2018	Mojo Juju	Female Music Artist	Won

=== National Indigenous Music Awards ===
The National Indigenous Music Awards is an annual awards ceremony that recognises the achievements of Indigenous Australians in music. Mojo Juju have won two awards

Year	Nominee / work	Award	Result	Ref.
2019	Mojo Juju	Artist of the Year	Nominated	
2019	Native Tongue	Album of the Year	Won	
2019	"Native Tongue"	Song of the Year	Won	
2019	"Native Tongue"	Film clip of the Year	Nominated	
2022	"Sometime"	Song of the Year	Nominated	
2023	Mo'Ju	Artist of the Year	Nominated	
2023	Oro Plata Mata	Album of the Year	Nominated	

=== National Live Music Awards ===
The National Live Music Awards (NLMAs) are a broad recognition of Australia's diverse live industry, celebrating the success of the Australian live scene. The awards commenced in 2016.

Year	Nominee / work	Award	Result	Ref.
2016	Mojo Juju	Live R&B or Soul Act of the Year	Nominated	
2017	Mojo Juju	Live R&B or Soul Act of the Year	Nominated	
2018	Mojo Juju	Live R&B or Soul Act of the Year	Won	
2018	Mojo Juju	Best Live Act of the Year - People's Choice	Nominated	
2019	Mojo Juju	Live Act of the Year	Nominated	
2019	Mojo Juju	Live R&B or Soul Act of the Year	Won	
2019	Mojo Juju	Victorian Live Act of the Year	Won	
2023	Mo'Ju	Best R&B or Soul Act	Won	
