= Not Art =

Studio album by Big Scary
- Released: 28 June 2013
- Studio: Metung (East Gippsland); The Landen Manor (Melbourne); Mixed Business Studios (Melbourne)
- Genre: Pop rock
- Length: 42:48
- Label: Pieater; Barsuk Records
- Producer: Jo Syme, *Tom Iansek

Big Scary chronology
| Vacation (2011) | Not Art (2013) | Animal (2016) |

Singles from Not Art
- 1. "Phil Collins" Released: February 2013; 2. "Luck Now" Released: April 2013; 3. "Twin Rivers" Released: 12 July 2013; 4. "Invest" Released: February 2014

Not Art is the second studio album by Australian Indie pop duo Big Scary. It was released in Australia on 28 June 2013. The album debuted and peaked at number 32 on the ARIA Charts. In late 2013, the duo signed with Barsuk Records and the album was released in North America in March 2014.

At the J Awards of 2013, the album was nominated for Australian Album of the Year. At the AIR Awards of 2013, the album was nominated for Best Independent Album. At the ARIA Music Awards of 2013, the album was nominated for Breakthrough Artist - Release and Best Independent Release. At the Music Victoria Awards of 2013, the album was nominated for Best Album. The album won the 2013 Australian Music Prize.

== Singles ==
The lead single "Phil Collins" was released in February 2013. Tester McFlyn from The Music Network said "This slow burning song defies the conventions of a lead single". Tom Iansek said its selection of lead single was a ploy to misdirect saying "We released 'Phil Collins' first knowing that it wasn't a single at all. It's kind of moody, there's no real catchy chorus. I guess we just thought it was more of a mood-setter for the album. Bands tend to put the catchiest, poppiest out first as the single, then everyone is expecting a bright, catchy album to follow it. A lot of the time that isn't the case. We wanted to suggest that it would be a darker record and we definitely tried to keep people guessing a bit."

"Luck Now" was released in April 2013. In an album review, FBI Radio called it the "standout" saying "[it's] a song that leads a delicate piano intro into a solid wall of synth, harmony, drum and string."

"Twin Rivers" was released digitally on 12 July 2013 and included two remixes of the song. The music video was released in November 2013.

"Invest" was released in February 2014 as the fourth and final single.

== Critical reception ==
Professional ratings
Review scores
| Source | Rating |
|---|---|
| AllMusic | 4/5 stars |

FBI Radio said "The duo have left behind the rock-heavy sounds of their debut, Vacation, to find a more emotive sound [and] as the album progresses, so does the band's experimentation". They concluded saying "This album asks a lot of questions, but doesn't provide many answers. It forces you to consider 'What is Art?' and 'What is Not Art?'. Reward yourself with a listen, and make up your own mind."

Bernard Zuel from Sydney Morning Herald said the album "gets under your skin" saying "Even when everything is simple and calm, these songs seem to bulge with powerful doses of passion of all types." Andrew P Street from The Guardian said Big Scary have "...created a sonically lush and diverse work that's already a shoo-in for being one of the best Australian albums of 2013, filled with guitars, keys, percussion, electronics and more."

Tester McFlyn from The Music Network said "Big Scary are still in the process of discovering their sound and Not Art is indicative of that. While the record is more focused than their debut, the sonic influences are still wildly diverse; from Jeff Buckley to Bruce Springsteen to Kanye West, Not Art pays homage to an eclectic blend of artists and genres and that’s the best thing about it." Matt Collar from All Music said the album "showcases the band's melodic, atmospheric and stylistically varied sound."

== Track listing ==
Not Art track listing
| No. | Title | Writer(s) | Length |
|---|---|---|---|
| 1. | "Hello, My Name Is" | Tom Iansek; Joanna Syme | 3:12 |
| 2. | "Luck Now" | Iansek; Syme | 3:56 |
| 3. | "Harmony Sometimes" | Iansek; Syme | 2:31 |
| 4. | "Belgian Blues" | Iansek; Syme | 4:31 |
| 5. | "Phil Collins" | Iansek; Syme | 4:01 |
| 6. | "Twin Rivers" | Iansek; Syme | 4:03 |
| 7. | "Invest" | Iansek; Syme | 4:30 |
| 8. | "Lay Me Down" | Iansek; Syme | 4:00 |
| 9. | "Why Hip Hop Sucks in '13" | Iansek; Syme | 5:43 |
| 10. | "Long Worry" | Iansek; Syme | 3:46 |
| 11. | "Final Thoughts with Tom and Jo" | Iansek; Syme | 2:35 |

== Charts ==
Chart performance for Not Art
| Chart (2013) | Peak position |
|---|---|
| Australian Albums (ARIA) | 32 |

== Release history ==
Release history for Not Art
| Country | Date | Format | Label | Catalogue |
|---|---|---|---|---|
| Australia | 28 June 2013 | CD; digital download; LP | Pieater | PIE006 |
| United States of America | 25 March 2014 | CD; digital download; LP | Barsuk Records | BARK138 |
