= Animal (Big Scary album) =

Studio album by Big Scary
- Released: 2 September 2016
- Studio: Headgap Studios (Melbourne)
- Genre: Pop rock
- Length: 56:43
- Label: Pieater
- Producer: Tom Iansek

Big Scary chronology
Not Art (2013)	Animal (2016)	Daisy (2021)

Singles from Animal
- 1. "Organism" Released: September 2015; 2. "Over Matter" Released: 2 June 2016; 3. "The Opposite of Us" Released: 6 July 2013

Animal is the third studio album by Australian Indie pop duo Big Scary. It was announced on 2 June 2016 alongside the album's second single "Over Matter" and released on 2 September 2016. The album was presented as a four-part experience drawing inspiration from the daily cycle of the animal kingdom; hunting, lurking, resting and waking. The album debuted and peaked at number 5 on the ARIA Charts, becoming the duo's first top ten album.

At the J Awards of 2016, the album was nominated for Australian Album of the Year. The album was nominated at the 2016 Australian Music Prize. At the AIR Awards of 2017, the album was nominated for Best Independent Album. At the ARIA Music Awards of 2017, Tom Iansek was nominated for Producer of the Year.

== Singles ==
"Organism" was released in September 2015 as the album's lead single. Liam Apter from Pile Rats said "'Organism' doesn't strike you as a single that'll bowl you over with its steady tempo, wavering vocals and the organ jam that strides in later, but the off-kilter beauty of it is what makes it shine"

"Over Matter" was released as the album's second single on 2 June 2016 alongside the album's announcement. Mike Hohnen from Music Feeds said "Populated by Tom Iansek's unmistakable falsetto and sustained by Jo Syme's optimistic beat, 'Over Matter' takes the listener on a six-minute sonic, allowing for moments of contemplation or even meditation."

"The Opposite of Us" was released on 6 July 2016 as the album's third and final single. The song peaked at number 100 on the ARIA chart, becoming the duo's first to peak inside the top 100. The single was certified gold in Australia in June 2020. Hannah Maire from Atwood Magazine described the song as "a nurturing track that unfolds in a gentle yet powerful manner. What seems like such a beautifully innocent and reflective track holds such a significant and deeper meaning within album."

== Critical reception ==
Professional ratings
Review scores
Source	Rating
Best Before	8.5/10 stars

Craig Mathieson from Sydney Morning Herald called the album "An hour of dazzling, detailed music that matches electronic textures to nefarious horn patterns and malevolent melodies, it's a record that doesn't just transcend genres, it wrestles with psychological unease and personal need."

Sally McMullen from Music Feeds said "Animal is definitely not an easy album to pigeonhole. While constantly switching vibes and playing with different sonic styles, the two-piece transition between the synth-soaked dance tracks to raw and ethereal laments with apparent ease. Big Scary's latest work is ambitious, diverse, sometimes a little confusing, but always compelling from chapter to chapter."

Alexander Kelly from Best Before called the album "their greatest album to date" saying "Split into four movements of the animal, tracks coincide with this flow of emotional progression, as Iansek and Syme attempt to dissect the basic animalistic tendencies which humans gloss over thanks to technology and perhaps even music itself".

Hannah Maire from Atwood Magazine said "Animal has a unique characteristic about it: The album is split up into four sections, based upon the primal drives an animal possesses: hunting, lurking, resting and waking. The duo have carefully crafted the album to reflect the process of working through uncomfortable drives and urges, eventually heading towards the progression of clarity and this is where Big Scary... have walked the line and fallen on the right side."

== Track listing ==
Animal track listing
No.	Title	Writer(s)	Length
1.	"Oxygen"	Tom Iansek; Joanna Syme	3:23
2.	"Organism"	Iansek; Syme	3:16
3.	"Double Darkness"	Iansek; Syme	4:35
4.	"Saviour Add Vice"	Iansek; Syme	3:35
5.	"Lone Bird"	Iansek; Syme	4:18
6.	"The Endless Story"	Iansek; Syme	4:10
7.	"Flutism"	Iansek; Syme	4:45
8.	"Up and Up and Up"	Iansek; Syme	4:14
9.	"Breathe Underwater"	Iansek; Syme	2:58
10.	"The Opposite of Us"	Iansek; Syme	2:58
11.	"Heaven on Earth"	Iansek; Syme	6:12
12.	"Over Matter"	Iansek; Syme	6:20
13.	"Lamina"	Iansek; Syme
113.	Untitled		4:35
Total length:			56:43

== Charts ==
Chart performance for Animal
Chart (2016)	Peak position
Australian Albums (ARIA)	5

== Release history ==
Release history for Animal
Country	Date	Format	Label	Catalogue
Australia	2 September 2016	CD; digital download; streaming; 2xLP	Pieater	PIE012
