= Ziggy Alberts =

Australian folk singer

- Born: July 1994 (age 32); Australia
- Occupations: Singer; songwriter
- Years active: 2011–present
- Label: Commonfolk Records
- Website: ziggyalberts.com

Ziggy Alberts (born July 1994) is an Australian singer-songwriter. He is best known for his studio album Laps Around the Sun, which peaked at number 2 on the ARIA Charts for Australian Artist Albums in November 2018.

== Early life ==
Ziggy Alberts was born in July 1994 and grew up on the Sunshine Coast, Queensland and was homeschooled until the age of 13. Alberts told Triple J "I was looking into dentistry and engineering – no creative stuff". On 31 December 2010, his parents gave the budding dentist a guitar as a graduation gift. He said "I wasn't planning to be a musician, so I was like 'Thanks for this present but…' They said, 'maybe it's time to explore songwriting, and it's just gone from there." Alberts attended public school on the Sunshine Coast and graduated when he was 16 years old.

== Career ==
=== 2011–2016: Career beginnings ===
Alberts picked up a guitar in 2011 and began busking down the East Coast of Australia. In 2012, he released his first self-released EP titled Feels Like Home. Shortly after, Alberts co-founded his own record label Commonfolk Records. In October 2013, he released his first studio album Made of Water and spent most of 2014 touring before releasing his second studio album Land & Sea in December 2014.

In October 2015, Alberts released the single "Runaway" Alberts said "Runaway is a song about reopening up a relationship that heavily affected my emotional trust, in order to become friends and heal those trust issues." In May 2016, Alberts released the 5-track EP Four Feet in the Forest; the EP highlights social and environmental issues. He performed 44 shows across Australia in 2016 with the "Start Over Summer Tour".

=== 2017–2018: Laps Around the Sun ===
In 2017, Alberts toured 11 European countries as part of the "Tell Me European Tour", including festival performances in France (Fête de la Musique), Netherlands (Mundial Festival and Surfana Festival) and Germany (Bochum Total). In September 2017, Alberts released "Heaven", the first single from his forthcoming studio album. The song became his first song to make the ARIA Singles Chart, debuting and peaking at number 85. "Love Me Now" was released in May 2018, followed by "Laps Around the Sun" in August and "Stronger" in September 2018. In November 2018, Alberts released his third studio album Laps Around the Sun, which became his first charting album, peaking at number 9 on the ARIA Album Chart and number 2 on the ARIA Australian Artist Albums. The album is a metaphor about the Earth's rotation in a passionate message about the importance of protecting marine life.

=== 2019: A Postcard from an Australian Summer and further singles ===
In July 2019, a live EP titled A Postcard from an Australian Summer was released. In August, a new single "Intentions (22)" was released.

On 19 December 2019, ARIA presented Alberts with gold certifications for six songs and platinum certification for two songs and an EP.

=== 2020-2021: I Won't Give You Up and Searching for Freedom ===
In January 2020, Alberts released the single "Together", in response to the Australian Bushfire Crisis. The artist donated 10% of streaming income from the first month of this single release to organisations involved with the Bushfire relief.

In June 2020, Alberts released the single "Don't Get Caught Up". The single was criticised for its possible lyrical allusions to anti-vaccination and anti-5G conspiracy theories. Alberts responded to the controversy with social media posts in which he reiterated his opposition to, specifically, "…the potential for punishment and fines if people do not comply" with mask mandates and lockdowns enacted during the COVID-19 pandemic.

In August 2020, Alberts release a collaborative EP I Won't Give You Up with prolific Sydney Hip Hop duo, Horrorshow.

In September 2020, Alberts released his fourth album, Truly Acoustic.

In November 2020, Ziggy Alberts announced details of his studio album Searching for Freedom, released on 19 March 2021.

In November 2021, Alberts announced his Commonfolk Records, had signed a global distribution deal with Ingrooves Music. On 5 November 2021, Alberts released "I Believe".

=== 2022-present: Dancing in the Dark ===
In May 2022, Alberts announced the forthcoming release of his fifth studio album, Dancing in the Dark. The album is due for release on 4 November 2022.

In September 2026, Alberts released "I Blame Myself" and announced 7th studio album Twin Flames.

== Discography ==
=== Albums ===
List of albums, with selected chart positions
Title	Album details	Peak chart positions	Certifications
Title	Album details	AUS	Certifications
Made of Water	Released: 3 October 2013; Label: Commonfolk; Formats: CD, digital download	—	
Land & Sea	Released: 12 December 2014; Label: Commonfolk; Formats: CD, digital download	—	ARIA: Gold
Laps Around the Sun	Released: 9 November 2018; Label: Commonfolk; Formats: CD, digital download, LP, streaming	9	ARIA: 2× Platinum
Searching for Freedom	Released: 19 March 2021; Label: Commonfolk; Formats: CD, digital download, LP, streaming	27	
Dancing in the Dark	Released: 4 November 2022; Label: Commonfolk; Formats: CD, digital download, LP, streaming	—	
New Love	Released: 21 February 2025; Label: Commonfolk; Formats: CD, digital download, LP, streaming	18	
Twin Flames	Released: 16 October 2026; Label: Commonfolk; Formats: CD, digital download, LP, streaming	28	
"—" denotes a recording that did not chart or was not released in that territory.

=== EPs ===
List of extended plays
Title	EP details	Certifications
Feels Like Home	Released: 2012; Label: self-released; Format: Digital download	
Four Feet in the Forest	Released: 9 May 2016; Label: Commonfolk; Format: Digital download	ARIA: 2× Platinum
A Postcard from an Australian Summer	Released: 26 July 2019; Label: Commonfolk; Format: Digital download, streaming	
I Won't Give You Up (with Horrowshow)	Released: 21 August 2020; Label: Commonfolk; Format: Digital download, streaming	
Truly Acoustic	Released: 2 October 2020; Label: Commonfolk; Formats: digital download, LP, streaming	

=== Singles ===
List of singles as lead artist
Title	Year	Peak chart positions		Certifications	Album
Title	Year	AUS	NZ Hot	Certifications	Album
"Simple Things (The Ocean Song)"	2013	—	—		Made of Water
"Days in the Sun"	2014	—	—	ARIA: 2× Platinum; RMNZ: Gold	Land & Sea
"Gone (The Pocahontas Song)"	2014	—	—	ARIA: 2× Platinum; RMNZ: Gold	Land & Sea
"Runaway"	2015	—	—	ARIA: 3× Platinum; RMNZ: Platinum	Four Feet in the Forest
"Four Feet in the Forest"	2016	—	—	ARIA: Gold	Four Feet in the Forest
"Heaven"	2017	85	—	ARIA: Platinum; RMNZ: Gold	Laps Around the Sun
"Love Me Now"	2018	199	—	ARIA: 2× Platinum; RMNZ: Gold	Laps Around the Sun
"Juke Jam" (Triple J Like a Version)	2018	—	—		Like a Version: Volume Fourteen
"Laps Around the Sun"	2018	149	—	ARIA: 3× Platinum; RMNZ: Platinum	Laps Around the Sun
"Stronger"	2018	—	—	ARIA: Platinum	Laps Around the Sun
"Yu (A Song for Koda)"	2018	—	—		Laps Around the Sun
"On Hold"	2018	—	—	ARIA: Gold	Laps Around the Sun
"Bright Lights"	2019	—	—	ARIA: Gold	Laps Around the Sun
"Intentions (22)"	2019	—	—	ARIA: Gold	—N/a
"Together"	2020	—	24	ARIA: Platinum; ARIA: Gold (Instrumental)	Searching for Freedom
"Don't Get Caught Up"	2020	—	—	ARIA: Gold	Searching for Freedom
"Heaven Part 2" (with Horrorshow)	2020	—	—		I Won't Give You Up
"Heartbeat"	2020	—	—	ARIA: Gold	Searching for Freedom
"Letting Go"	2021	—	—	ARIA: Gold	Searching for Freedom
"I Believe"	2021	—	—		Dancing in the Dark
"Tattoos"	2022	—	—		Dancing in the Dark
"The Great Divide"	2022	—	—		Dancing in the Dark
"The Sun and the Sea" (with Donovan Woods)	2022	—	—		Dancing in the Dark
"Campfire"	2022	—	—		Dancing in the Dark
"Rewind"	2022	—	—		Dancing in the Dark
"New Love"	2024	—	—		New Love
"Outlaw"	2024	—	—		New Love
"Where Does the Love Go?"	2024	—	—		New Love
"Singing for Country"	2024	—	—		New Love
"I'm With You"	2025	—	—		New Love
"Cyclones"	2025	—	—		Twin Flames
"You're Like Christmas	2025	—	—		Twin Flames
"I Need My Woman"	2026	—	—		Twin Flames
"I Blame Myself"	2026	—	—		Twin Flames
"Valerie"	2026	—	—		Twin Flames
"—" denotes a recording that did not chart or was not released in that territory.

=== Other certified songs ===
List of other certified songs
Title	Year	Certifications	Album
"Follow the Ocean"	2013	ARIA: Gold	Made of Water
"Youngblood"	2013	ARIA: Gold	Made of Water
"Hands I Can Hold"	2014	ARIA: Platinum	Land & Sea
"Better Off"	2016	ARIA: Gold	Four Feet in the Forest
"Start Over"	2016	ARIA: Gold	Four Feet in the Forest
"Tell Me"	2016	ARIA: Gold	Four Feet in the Forest
"Worn Out "	2018	ARIA: Gold	Laps Around The Sun

== Awards and nominations ==
=== AIR Awards ===
The Australian Independent Record Awards (commonly known informally as AIR Awards) is an annual awards night to recognise, promote and celebrate the success of Australia's Independent Music sector.

Year	Nominee / work	Award	Result	Ref.
2023	Dancing in the Dark	Best Independent Blues and Roots Album or EP	Nominated	

=== APRA Awards ===
The APRA Awards are held in Australia and New Zealand by the Australasian Performing Right Association to recognise songwriting skills, sales and airplay performance by its members annually. Alberts has been nominated for one award.

Year	Nominee / work	Award	Result	Ref.
2019	"Love Me Now"	Song of the Year	Shortlisted	
2020	"Laps Around the Sun"	Most Performed Blues & Roots Work of the Year	Nominated	
2021	"Together"	Most Performed Blues & Roots Work of the Year	Nominated	
2022	"Letting Go"	Most Performed Blues & Roots Work of the Year	Won	
2023	"I Believe"	Most Performed Blues & Roots Work of the Year	Nominated	
2024	"Dancing in the Dark"	Most Performed Blues & Roots Work of the Year	Won	
2025	"New Love"	Most Performed Blues & Roots Work of the Year	Won	

=== ARIA Music Awards ===
The ARIA Music Awards is an annual ceremony presented by Australian Recording Industry Association (ARIA), which recognise excellence, innovation, and achievement across all genres of the music of Australia. They commenced in 1987.

Year	Nominee / work	Award	Result	Ref.
2021	Searching for Freedom	Best Blues and Roots Album	Nominated	
2023	Dancing in the Dark	Best Blues and Roots Album	Nominated	

=== Environmental Music Prize ===
The Environmental Music Prize is a quest to find a theme song to inspire action on climate and conservation. It commenced in 2022.

Year	Nominee / work	Award	Result	Ref.
2023	"Together"	Environmental Music Prize	Nominated	
