= Laurel Edwards =

Australian broadcaster

- Born: October 1966 (age 60)
- Occupations: Television presenter; radio announcer; singer
- Spouse: Troy Cassar-Daley (m. 1996)
- Children: Clay, Jem Cassar-Daley

Laurel Edwards (born October 1966) is an Australian television presenter, radio announcer, and singer.

== Early life ==
Edwards was probably born in early October 1966.

== Career ==
Edwards' radio career began in 1992, commencing work at Brisbane radio station 4KQ, where she remained until 2022. In 2005, Edwards was named as Brisbane's longest-serving female breakfast radio presenter. 4KQ marked Edwards' 25th anniversary with the station in 2017.

Edwards' first television job was hosting Nine Network children's program OK for Kids in 1987. As of 2017 she was a presenter on Seven Network travel show The Great Day Out. She is the sole remaining original presenter on the show, having been with the program since it was launched as The Great South East in 1997.

In 2023 she was inducted into the Australian Commercial Radio Hall of Fame.

== Personal life ==
Edwards met Troy Cassar-Daley at the Gympie Music Muster in 1993, and they married in 1996.

They have two children, Clay and Jem. Clay is a radio presenter with Brisbane Indigenous station 98.9 FM, where he co-presents the Dunn & Daley Show with Jamie Dunn. Jem Cassar-Daley is a singer-songwriter.
