= AIR Awards of 2023 =

Edition of annual Australian music award

2023 AIR Awards
- Date: 3 August 2023
- Venue: Freemasons Hall, Adelaide, Australia

Highlights
- Most wins: King Stingray (3)
- Website: https://air.org.au/air-awards/

The 2023 AIR Awards is the seventeenth annual Australian Independent Record Labels Association Music Awards ceremony (generally known as the AIR Awards), which took place on 3 August 2023 in Adelaide. The 2023 AIR Awards introduced two new categories; the Independent Marketing Team of the Year and the Independent Publicity Team of the Year. The nominations were revealed on 31 May 2023.

At the awards ceremony, AIR's CEO Maria Amato said, "It was a great night of celebration and recognition for the talented, and resilient Australian independent artist and label community."

== Performances ==
- Jem Cassar-Daley
- Andy Golledge
- Yours Truly

== Nominees and winners ==
Winners indicated in boldface, with other nominees in plain.

Independent Album of the Year	Independent Song of the Year
**King Stingray – King Stingray**; Daniel Johns – FutureNever; Julia Jacklin – Pre Pleasure; Laura Jean – Amateurs; Northlane – Obsidian	**Genesis Owusu – "Get Inspired"**; Cub Sport – "Always Got the Love"; Jen Cloher – "Mana Takatāpui"; Julia Jacklin – "I Was Neon"; King Stingray – "Camp Dog"
Breakthrough Independent Artist of the Year	Best Independent Blues and Roots Album or EP
**King Stingray**; Andy Golledge; Jem Cassar-Daley; Teen Jesus and the Jean Teasers; Wanderers	**Dope Lemon – Rose Pink Cadillac**; Baby Velvet – Please Don’t Be In Love With Someone Else; Little Quirks – Call to Unknowns; William Crighton – Water and Dust; Ziggy Alberts – Dancing in the Dark
Best Independent Children's Album or EP	Best Independent Classical Album or EP
**Teeny Tiny Stevies – How to Be Creative**; Emily Wurramara – Ayarra Emeba (Calm Songs); Emma Memma – Emma Memma; Play School – Very Jazzy Street Party; The Wiggles – ReWiggled	**William Barton and Véronique Serret – Heartland**; Ensemble Offspring – To Listen, To Sing – Ngarra-Burria: First Peoples Composers; Melbourne Symphony Orchestra, Benjamin Northey and Nigel Westlake – Blueback (Original Motion Picture Score); Mirusia – Songbird; Tasmanian Symphony Orchestra – Nightlight
Best Independent Country Album or EP	Best Independent Dance or Electronica Album or EP
**Andy Golledge – Strength of a Queen**; Adam Brand – All or Nothing; Casey Barnes – Light It Up; Freya Josephine Hollick – The Real World; Lyn Bowtell – Wiser	**Confidence Man – TILT**; Flume – Palaces; Ninajirachi – Second Nature; Telenova – Stained Glass Love; The Jungle Giants – Love Signs (Remixed)
Best Independent Dance, Electronica or Club Single	Best Independent Heavy Album or EP
**Cub Sport – "Always Got the Love"**; Flume featuring May-a – "Say Nothing"; Lime Cordiale, Idris Elba – "Holiday" (Fatboy Slim Remix); Memphis LK – "Coffee"; PNAU & Troye Sivan – "You Know What I Need"	**Northlane – Obsidian**; CLAMM – Care; Parkway Drive – Darker Still; Thornhill – Heroine; Yours Truly – is this what i look like?
Best Independent Hip Hop Album or EP	Best Independent Jazz Album or EP
**Jesswar – Life's Short, Live Big**; Allday – Excuse Me; Danté Knows – Phase One; Kween G – Sensible Rebel; Yawdoesitall – Life I Chose	**Donny Benét – Le Piano**; Barney Mcall – Precious Energy; Jeremy Rose – Face to Face; Mildlife – Live from South Channel Island; Surprise Chef – Education & Recreation
Best Independent Pop Album or EP	Best Independent Punk Album or EP
**Daniel Johns – FutureNever**; Big Scary – Me and You; Jem Cassar-Daley – I Don't Know Who to Call; Telenova – Stained Glass Love; Vance Joy – In Our Own Sweet Time	**Teen Jesus and the Jean Teasers – Pretty Good for a Girl Band**; Body Type – Everything Is Dangerous but Nothing's Surprising; Hard-Ons – Yummy! (re-release); Press Club – Endless Motion; These New South Whales – TNSW
Best Independent Rock Album or EP	Best Independent Soul/R&B Album or EP
**King Stingray – King Stingray**; Ball Park Music – Weirder & Weirder; Camp Cope – Running with the Hurricane; Ocean Alley – Low Altitude Living; Slowly Slowly – Daisy Chain	**Felivand – Ties**; Ashli – Only One; Beckah Amani – April; Wanderers – Wanderers; Winston Surfshirt – Panna Cotta
Independent Marketing Team of the Year	Independent Publicity Team of the Year
**I OH YOU, Mushroom Marketing: Confidence Man – TILT**; ABC Music, The Orchard: The Wiggles – ReWiggled; Chugg Music, The Annex: Lime Cordiale – Cordi Elba; Domestic La La: Teen Jesus and the Jean Teasers – Pretty Good for a Girl Band; Future Classic: Flume – Palaces	**Genna Alexopoulos: Teen Jesus and the Jean Teasers – Pretty Good for a Girl Band**; Mushroom Publicity: Confidence Man – TILT; Positive Feedback: Lime Cordiale – Cordi Elba; RPM, Bec Brown Communications: – The Wiggles: ReWiggled; Thinking Loud: Genesis Owusu – "Get Inspired"
Best Independent Label	Outstanding Achievement Award
**Chapter Music**; ABC Music; Domestic La La; Liberation Music; UNFD	**Dr. Catherine Crock**

== See also ==
- Music of Australia
