= Queenscliff Music Festival =

Annual music festival in Victoria, Australia

Coordinates: 38°15′52″S 144°39′49″E

Queenscliff Music Festival is a live music festival held in the town of Queenscliff, located on the Bellarine Peninsula, Victoria, Australia. The festival began in 1997 and is held annually on the last weekend of November.

According to its website, officials cite the COVID-19 pandemic as grounds for cancelling the 2020 festival. It returned in 2021.

== Awards and nominations ==
=== Music Victoria Awards ===
The Music Victoria Awards, are an annual awards night celebrating Victorian music. Best Festival commenced in 2016.

Year	Nominee / work	Award	Result
2020	Queenscliff Music Festival	Best Festival	Nominated
