= Number 1 Dads =

Australian alternative rock band

1. 1 Dads
- Also known as: Dads
- Origin: Melbourne, Victoria, Australia
- Genres: Guitar pop, alt rock
- Years active: 2010–present
- Labels: Fly the Light, Pieater/Inertia
- Members: Tom Iansek
- Website: musicyourdadsmake.com

#1 Dads are an Australian alternative rock band devised by Tom Iansek, who is also lead vocalist-guitarist of Big Scary. He formed the group, initially named Dads in late 2010, as a side project during down time and plays music which is "more acoustic than electronic in construction" compared with the parent band. According to Sputnikmusic's reviewer Iansek "began a particularly fertile period of writing and recording. Holed up in his house, the prolific Melbourne songwriter laid down a full album."

Dads issued their first album, Man of Leisure, on 1 May 2011. Sputnikmusic's reviewer felt the group was "experimenting with a fuller, more layered approach, adding flourishes of bass and piano and vocal harmonies and mandolins and glockenspiels to his intricate guitar work, making for a rich, diverse and rewarding listen." Oscar Coleman of FasterLouder described it as "much more intricate and full though the use of varied instrumentation and layering, letting this project pique the interest of followers of his main band and lovers of acoustic ambiance alike." It provided the single, "Life, Oh Life" (July 2012), which Coleman felt was the "album's strongest and most memorable track... due to its creative brilliance, starting with the calming sound of raindrops and building to an acoustic climax, with the subtle flute melody complementing the scratching guitar and relaxing piano."

#1 Dads second album, About Face (August 2014), debuted at No. 80 on the ARIA Albums Chart; by mid-September of the following year it had spent 34 non-continuous weeks on the related ARIA Hitseekers Albums top 20 chart. For the 2015 promotion of About Face a live backing band with Gus Rigby on saxophone, Tom Snowdon (of Lowlakes) and Ainslie Wills were used. At the ARIA Music Awards of that year #1 Dads were nominated for Best Male Artist for the single, "Nominal".

In August 2026 Dad's announced Every Little Fire would be released in October 2026.

== Discography ==
=== Albums ===
Title	Album details	Peak chart positions
Title	Album details	AUS
Man of Leisure	Release date: May 2011; Label: Dads (DADS01) / Pieater (PIE004) / Fly The Light Records (FTL009); Formats: Vinyl, CD, digital download	—
About Face	Release date: August 2014; Label: Pieater (PIE007) / Fly The Light Records (FTL014); Formats: Vinyl, CD, digital download	80
Golden Repair	Release date: 6 March 2020; Label: Pieater (PIE027); Formats: Vinyl, CD, digital download	33
Every Little Fire	Release date: 16 October 2026; Label: Pieater (PIE041); Formats: Vinyl, CD, digital download	TBA

== Awards and nominations ==
=== AIR Awards ===
The Australian Independent Record Awards (commonly known informally as AIR Awards) is an annual awards night to recognise, promote and celebrate the success of Australia's Independent Music sector.

Year	Nominee / work	Award	Result	Ref.
2015	Number 1 Dads	Best Independent Artist	Nominated	
2015	Number 1 Dads	Breakthrough Independent Artist	Won	
2015	About Face	Best Independent Album	Nominated	
2021	Golden Repair	Best Independent Blues and Roots Album or EP	Nominated	

=== ARIA Music Awards ===
The ARIA Music Awards is an annual awards ceremony that recognises excellence, innovation, and achievement across all genres of Australian music.

Year	Nominee / work	Award	Result
2015	"Nominal"	Best Male Artist	Nominated

=== Australian Music Prize ===
The Australian Music Prize (the AMP) is an annual award of $30,000 given to an Australian band or solo artist in recognition of the merit of an album released during the year of award. The commenced in 2005.

Year	Nominee / work	Award	Result
2014	About Face	Australian Music Prize	Nominated

=== J Award ===
The J Awards are an annual series of Australian music awards that were established by the Australian Broadcasting Corporation's youth-focused radio station Triple J. They commenced in 2005.

Year	Nominee / work	Award	Result
2014	About Face	Australian Album of the Year	Nominated

=== Music Victoria Awards ===
The Music Victoria Awards, are an annual awards night celebrating Victorian music. They commenced in 2005.

Year	Nominee / work	Award	Result
2020	Tom Iansek	Best Musician	Nominated
2020	Tom Iansek for #1 Dads – Golden Repair	Best Producer	Nominated
