= Garrett Kato =

- Born: Garrett Kato; Port Coquitlam, Canada
- Genres: Indie folk; folk-pop
- Occupations: Singer; songwriter; producer
- Years active: 2015–present
- Labels: Nettwerk; Sony/ATV

Garrett Kato is a Canadian indie folk and folk-pop singer-songwriter and producer, based in Byron Bay, New South Wales.

Born in Port Coquitlam, British Columbia, Kato moved to Byron Bay at the age of 23 after visiting there briefly in 2010. He began busking and performing in clubs, before receiving a publishing deal from Sony/ATV Music Publishing.

== Career ==
Kato released his debut studio album in 2015, titled That Low and Lonesome Sound through Nettwerk Records. In 2016, his song "Sweet Jane" from his debut album appeared in the American comedy film, Bad Moms. Later that year, he produced Australian singer Ziggy Alberts's second EP, Four Feet in the Forest, which was assigned a double-platinum certification by the Australian Recording Industry Association. In 2017, he started receiving increased recognition when his song "Take It Slowly" gained significant activity on streaming platforms.

Distant Land was released as an EP by Kato on June 14, 2019. In March 2020, he released an EP titled S. Hemisphere, featuring the singles "Holding Onto You" and "Breathe It In", the latter being a collaboration with Australian folk singer Julia Stone. He released another EP the following month, titled N. Hemisphere, alongside "Moon", a single.

On October 16, 2020, Kato released the single, "I See You", featuring contributions from Aboriginal Australian singer Thelma Plum and producer Sam Sakr. His second studio album, Hemispheres was released in December 2020, featuring the S. Hemisphere and N. Hemisphere EPs, alongside new songs.

Kato released "Never Be Us" in April 2021 as a single, which was followed by his Kumamoto EP on July 9. He released "Rearview Mirror" as a single in December of the same year. In March 2022, he released the single "Secrets", with his third studio album, Small Town Rituals, following later that year. It was succeeded by the EPs, Nighthawks in 2023 and Surrender in 2024, and his fourth studio album, Whenever I Go, in 2026.

== Discography ==
=== Studio albums ===
Title	Details
That Low and Lonesome Sound	Released: September 11, 2015 (Note: Titles and years adapted from Spotify.); Label: Nettwerk; Formats: Digital
Hemispheres	Released: December 4, 2020; Label: Nettwerk; Formats: Digital
Small Town Rituals	Released: June 17, 2022; Label: Nettwerk; Formats: Digital
Whenever I Go	Released: February 13, 2026; Label: Nettwerk; Formats: Digital

=== EPs ===
Title	Details
Distant Land	Released: June 14, 2019 (Note: Adapted from Apple Music.); Label: Nettwerk; Formats: Digital
S. Hemisphere	Released: March 6, 2020; Label: Nettwerk; Formats: Digital
N. Hemisphere	Released: August 28, 2020; Label: Nettwerk; Formats: Digital
Kumamoto	Released: July 9, 2021; Label: Nettwerk; Formats: Digital
Nighthawks	Released: September 1, 2023; Label: Nettwerk; Formats: Digital
Surrender	Released: August 9, 2024; Label: Nettwerk; Formats: Digital

=== Singles ===
Title	Year	Album
"Take It Slowly"	2017	Non-album singles
"Love Is an Advert"	2018	Non-album singles
"Hipster Kids"	2018	Non-album singles
"I'll Be Around"	2018	Distant Land
"River Mouth"	2019	Distant Land
"Where the Vampires Hide"	2019	Distant Land
"I'll Be Around (Acoustic)"	2019	Non-album single
"Only You"	2019	Hemispheres
"Control"	2019	Hemispheres
"Holding on to You"	2019	Hemispheres
"Breathe It In" (with Julia Stone)	2020	Hemispheres
"Moon"	2020	Hemispheres
"It's Easier When You're Standing There"	2020	Hemispheres
"Permanently"	2020	Hemispheres
"I See You"	2020	Hemispheres
"Be"	2021	Kumamoto
"Firestarter"	2021	Kumamoto
"Never Be Us"	2021	Kumamoto
"Delusional"	2021	Kumamoto
"Disappearing Light"	2021	Small Town Rituals
"Rearview Mirror"	2021	Small Town Rituals
"Drugstore Houses"	2022	Small Town Rituals
"Secrets"	2022	Small Town Rituals
"One and Only"	2022	Small Town Rituals
"Losing Touch"	2023	Nighthawks
"Slow Motion"	2023	Nighthawks
"Never Alone" (with Elina)	2023	Nighthawks
"Changing"	2023	Nighthawks
"Nowhere"	2023	Nighthawks
"Love Me Now (Friends Edition)"	2023	Non-album singles
"Changing (Acoustic)"	2023	Non-album singles
"Are You Ok?"	2024	Surrender
"Nothing More"	2024	Surrender
"Easy" (with Billianne)	2024	Surrender
"It Gets Better"	2024	Surrender
"Babe, I'm All Yours"	2024	Surrender
"I Will"	2024	Whenever I Go
"Be (Acoustic)"	2025	Non-album singles
"My Girl"	2026	Non-album singles
"Sleeping on the Drive Home"	2026	Non-album singles

=== Production credits ===
Albums (Note: Titles and artists adapted from AllMusic. Years adapted from Spotify.)

Title	Artist	Year	Note(s)
Atlas Shoulders	Pierce Brothers	2018	Peaked at #18 in Australia.
Too Young	Kyle Lionhart	2019	
My Reality	Dami Im	2021	Peaked at #12 in Australia.

EPs

Title	Artist	Year	Note(s)
Keep in Mind	Kyle Lionhart	2015	
Four Feet in the Forest	Ziggy Alberts	2016	Certified 2× Platinum in Australia.
The Landing Songs	Riley Pearce	2019	
Acoustic	Riley Pearce	2020	
The Night	Pete Murray	2021	Peaked at #22 in Australia.
Half a World Away	Dylan Wright	2024	

Singles

Title	Artist	Year
"Truth"	Alexander William	2017
"Compromise"	Kyle Lionhart	2017
"Back End Roads/Juno"	Pierce Brothers	2018
"Found My Place"	Pete Murray	2020
"If We Never Dance Again"	Pete Murray	2021
"Twenties"	Camille Trail	2023
"Everything We Wanted (Lucky Stars)"	Kyle Lionhart	2023
"Gotta Get to Know You"	Camille Trail	2024
