= Les Golledge =

English footballer (1911–1989)

Personal information
- Full name: Leslie Howard Golledge
- Date of birth: 3 August 1911
- Place of birth: Chipping Sodbury, England
- Date of death: 19 July 1989 (aged 77)
- Place of death: Bristol, England
- Height: 5 ft 7 1/2 in (1.71 m)
- Position: Forward

Youth career
- Shortwood
- Kingswood

Senior career*
Years	Team	Apps	(Gls)
1930–1934	Bristol City	25	(3)
1934–1936	Bristol Rovers	9	(1)
1937	Lincoln City	0	(0)
Total		34	(4)
- * Club domestic league appearances and goals

Leslie Howard Golledge (3 August 1911 – 19 July 1989) was a professional footballer who played as a centre forward, inside forward and right half in The Football League for Bristol City and Bristol Rovers in the 1930s.

Golledge joined Bristol City as an amateur in 1930, turning professional a year later, where he played 25 times and scored three goals in the football league. Following a trial with Rovers in 1934 he joined them as an amateur, playing mostly for their reserve team. He won two Western League championships with the reserves, and made nine first team appearances, scoring a single goal. He ended his time with Rovers playing for the 'A' team (the third team), and later had a spell playing for Lincoln City's reserves.

Despite his small number of appearances, Golledge holds a place in the Bristol Rovers history books as his only goal for them was their 1000th goal in league football.
