= Tom Iansek =

Australian record producer and musician

- Born: Australia
- Occupations: Songwriter; musician; record producer
- Years active: 2006–present
- Member of: Big Scary; #1 Dads; No Mono

Tom Iansek is a Melbourne-based Australian record producer and songwriter, best known for his work with #1 Dads, Big Scary, and No Mono. Iansek has produced music for Emma Louise, Airling, Lanks, and Slum Sociable.

== Career ==
=== 2006-present: Big Scary ===
In 2006, Iansek formed the folk rock band Big Scary with Joanna Syme. In late 2008, the band went into the studio for the first time, recording six live tracks in a single day. In October 2008, the duo uploaded "The Apple Song" to Triple J Unearthed and officially released it in December 2008, alongside a self-titled debut EP. As of 2021, Big Scary have released four studio albums: Vacation (2011), Not Art (2013), Animal (2016), and Daisy (2021).

=== 2009: Small Time Hero ===
In 2009, Iansek released his debut album, Top of the Tree, under the moniker Small Time Hero. Iansek wrote, produced, mixed, and self-released the album.

=== 2010–present: #1 Dads ===
In 2010, Iansek formed the alternative rock band #1 Dads as a side project during downtime, with music that is "more acoustic than electronic in construction". As of 2026, #1 Dads have released four studio albums: Man of Leisure (2011), About Face (2014), Golden Repair (2020), and Every Little Fire (2026).

=== 2017–present: No Mono ===
In 2017, Iansek launched the band No Mono with Tom Snowden. Snowdon said of the collaboration, "For the past two years, we've been developing songs for this project, which we recently recorded at the Pieater studio in Collingwood. We like similar music and sounds and are great friends. It's been a very intuitive process. That's what this project is really about—exploring and cultivating our artistic relationship; we just follow our ears and our guts". As of 2021, No Mono have released two studio albums: Islands Part 1 (2018) and Islands Part 2 (2019).

=== Other work ===
In April 2017, Iansek re-released his debut album on vinyl under the title Small Time Hero, Top of the Tree for Record Store Day. In 2017, Iansek said "This is the first album I ever made. There was great joy and excitement for me making it. It was the beginning of my love for the entire music-making process, from songwriting and arranging to capturing the performance. I present it now to unashamedly show the beginnings of my journey into making music".

In 2018, Iansek co-produced The Paper Kites' third studio album, On the Train Ride Home.

== Personal life ==
Iansek has a son, born in May 2019.

== Solo discography ==
=== Albums ===
List of albums, with release date and label shown
Title	Details
Top of the Tree as Small Town Hero	Released: 2009; Re-release: 11 April 2017; Label: Pieater; Format: CD, LP, digital download

=== Featured as solo musician ===
List of non-single album tracks
Title	Year	Album
"Reckless" (Vance Joy featuring Bernard Fanning and Tom Iansek	2015	Beat the Drum – Celebrating 40 Years of Triple J
"Take Care of You" (Airling and Tom Iansek)	2017	Hard to Sleep, Easy to Dream
"Not a Fighter" (Airling and Tom Iansek)	2017	Hard to Sleep, Easy to Dream
"A Day in the Park" (Airling and Tom Iansek)	2017	Hard to Sleep, Easy to Dream
"Shut the Gate Out" (Airling and Tom Iansek)	2017	Hard to Sleep, Easy to Dream
"Outgrown" (Anatole featuring Tom Iansek	2018	Emulsion

== Awards and nominations ==
=== AIR Awards ===
The Australian Independent Record Awards (commonly known informally as AIR Awards) is an annual awards night to recognise, promote and celebrate the success of Australia's Independent Music sector.

Year	Nominee / work	Award	Result	Ref.
2024	Tom Iansek for I Get Into Trouble by Maple Glider	Independent Producer of the Year	Nominated	
2025	Tom Iansek for Lonely Tree by Tom Snowdon	Independent Producer of the Year	Nominated	

=== ARIA Music Awards ===
The ARIA Music Awards is an annual awards ceremony that recognises excellence, innovation, and achievement across all genres of Australian music. Tom Iansek has been nominated for one award.

Year	Nominee / work	Award	Result	Ref.
2017	Tom Iansek for Animal by Big Scary	Producer of the Year	Nominated	

=== Music Victoria Awards ===
The Music Victoria Awards are an annual awards night celebrating music from the state of Victoria. They commenced in 2005.

Year	Nominee / work	Award	Result	Ref.
2015	Tom Iansek	Best Male Musician	Nominated	
2018	Tom Iansek	Best Male Musician	Nominated	
2020	Tom Iansek	Best Musician	Nominated	
2020	Tom Iansek for Golden Repair by #1 Dads	Best Producer	Nominated	
