= Four Feet in the Forest =

EP by Ziggy Alberts
- Released: 9 May 2016
- Label: CommonFolk Records

Ziggy Alberts chronology
Land & Sea (2014)	Four Feet in the Forest (2016)	Laps Around the Sun (2018)

Singles from Four Feet in the Forest
- 1. "Runaway" Released: 9 October 2015; 2. "Four Feet in the Forest" Released: May 2016

Four Feet in the Forest is an extended play (EP) by Australian singer songwriter Ziggy Alberts and released in May 2016. The EP was certified platinum in Australia in December 2019.

The EP explores social and environmental issues whilst highlighting Alberts' own journey and pressure to maintain health whilst developing his music career. Alberts told This is Radelaide, "Every song on this record took months to write, till I got the subliminal/literal descriptive balance I envisioned. When I wrote the title track, 'Four Feet in the Forest', it was a real breakthrough song for me, personally - because I discovered a new maturity in creative description: and also began to lean less to writing about personal relationships with women in my life, and instead, emotion encapsulated in human form."

== Track listing ==
No.	Title	Length
1.	"Start Over"	3:41
2.	"Tell Me (The Hoddevik Song)"	4:16
3.	"Runaway"	4:33
4.	"Better Off"	5:36
5.	"Four Feet in the Forest"	3:34

== Certifications ==
Region	Certification	Certified units/sales
Australia (ARIA)	2× Platinum	140,000^{‡}
^{‡} Sales+streaming figures based on certification alone.

== Release history ==
Region	Date	Format	Label
Australia	9 May 2016	digital download; streaming	CommonFolk Records
