= AIR Awards =

Australian music awards

- Current: AIR Awards of 2024
- Awarded for: The AIR Awards recognise, promote and celebrate the success of Australia's Independent Music sector.
- Country: Australia
- Presented by: Australian Independent Record Labels Association
- First award: 2006; 20 years ago
- Website: air.org.au/air-awards/

The Australian Independent Record Awards (commonly known as AIR Awards) is an annual awards night to recognise, promote and celebrate the success of Australia's Independent Music sector.

== History ==
The inaugural 2006 awards were held at Blacket Hotel in Sydney on 29 November 2006 and sponsored by V energy drinks. The following awards ceremonies were held between October and December in Melbourne, Victoria from 2007 to 2015.

In December 2008 it was announced that Jägermeister, previously a "headline sponsor", would become the major sponsors until 2010. When a further three-year deal for sponsorship by Jägermeister was announced in 2010, the awards were renamed the Jägermeister Independent Music Awards. In 2013, Carlton Dry became the major sponsor, with the awards renamed Carlton Dry Independent Music Awards.

There were no awards in 2016, due to a move in the eligibility dates for the AIR Awards to align with the calendar year. The 2017 awards thus saw a slightly longer eligibility period than usual with members' releases period between 1 August 2015 and 31 December 2016.

From 2017 to 2019, the South Australian Government's newly established Live Music Events Fund promised funding to the Awards and concurrent music conference, to take place in Adelaide, South Australia. The events took place in July, along with Music SA's Umbrella: Winter City Sounds, a program of live music across Adelaide, and a couple of food and wine festivals in the city.

Since 2020, The Awards were held at the Freemasons Hall, Adelaide.

== Categories ==
The AIR Independent Music Awards are co-ordinated by The Australian Independent Record Labels Association), a non-profit, member-owned organisation representing Australia's independent recording sector.

In the inaugural edition, four awards were presented, Best Performing Independent Album, Best Performing Independent Single/EP, Best Performing Independent Single/EP and Best New Independent Artist. The "performing" element was dropped from the award the following year. Genre specific awards were introduced from 2007. The award for Best New Independent Artist changed to Breakthrough Independent Artist in 2009.

Since 2017, Nominees for the Awards must be released between the period 1 January to 31 December, preceding the Awards. All nominees must be Australian artists, must be self-released or released on an Australian independent label. All nominated master recordings must be entirely owned by an Australian artist or Australian Independent Label. For the purposes of these awards, Australian Independent Labels are businesses that are not owned in part or whole by one of the three major labels. For the avoidance of doubt, if an Australian Independent Label chooses to distribute its catalogue through a third-party major label, they will remain eligible for the awards.

== Judging process ==
The AIR invites all of its artist, associate, full and distributor members to put forward releases from the eligibility period for a long-list and releases which have charted in the AIR Music Charts during the eligibility period are also eligible for the long-list. The long list is presented to a voting academy of approximately 400 judges. The judging pool includes broadcasters (community radio, commercial radio, ABC Radio, music television channels and ABC television), artists, online music media, newspapers, AIR Members and other independent music industry representatives.

Judges choose their three favourite releases across the following categories:

- Independent Album of the Year
- Breakthrough Independent Artist of the Year
- Independent Song of the Year
- Best Independent Hip Hop Album/EP
- Best Independent Soul or R&B Album/EP
- Best Independent Country Album/EP
- Best Independent Blues & Roots Album/EP
- Best Independent Pop Album/EP
- Best Independent Punk Album/EP
- Best Independent Rock Album/EP
- Best Independent Heavy Album/EP

There are also specialist voting academies for:

- Best Independent Children's Album/EP
- Best Independent Classical Album/EP
- Best Independent Dance, Electronica, or Club Album/EP
- Best Independent Dance, Electronica, or Club Single
- Best Independent Jazz Album/EP

== Ceremonies ==
Year	Best Independent Artist	Best Independent Album	Best Independent Single/EP	Breakthrough Independent Artist
2006	Hilltop Hoods	The Hard Road by Hilltop Hoods	Blue King Brown by Blue King Brown	Gotye
2007	Sneaky Sound System	Grand National by John Butler Trio	"UFO" by Sneaky Sound System	British India
2008	The Herd	Gurrumul by Geoffrey Gurrumul Yunupingu	"Where the City Meets the Sea" by The Getaway Plan	Geoffrey Gurrumul Yunupingu
2009	The Drones	Havilah by The Drones	"Going to the Casino" by Philadelphia Grand Jury	Bertie Blackman
2010	Dan Sultan	Bliss Release by Cloud Control	"Rock It" by Little Red	Cloud Control
2011	The Jezabels	Adalita by Adalita	Dark Storm by The Jezabels	Emma Louise
2012	The Jezabels	Royal Headache by Royal Headache	Thinking in Textures by Chet Faker	Chet Faker
2013	Flume	Flume by Flume	God Loves You When You're Dancing by Vance Joy	Vance Joy
2014	Courtney Barnett	Hungry Ghost by Violent Soho	"Avant Gardener" by Courtney Barnett	Sheppard
2015	Courtney Barnett	Sometimes I Sit and Think, and Sometimes I Just Sit by Courtney Barnett	"Depreston" by Courtney Barnett	#1 Dads
2016	(No awards due to eligibility period change)			
2017	A.B. Original	Reclaim Australia by A.B. Original	"January 26" by A.B. Original featuring Dan Sultan	A.B. Original
2018	Jen Cloher	Everything Is Forgotten by Methyl Ethel, and Quiet Ferocity by The Jungle Giants	"Every Day's the Weekend" by Alex Lahey	Baker Boy
2019	Courtney Barnett	Tell Me How You Really Feel by Courtney Barnett, and Djarimirri by Geoffrey Gurrumul Yunupingu Djarimirri	"Native Tongue" by Mojo Juju	G Flip
2020	—N/a	Beware of the Dogs by Stella Donnelly	"Dance Monkey" by Tones and I	Tones and I
2021	—N/a	The Glow by DMA's	"Booster Seat" by Spacey Jane	Spacey Jane
2022	—N/a	Smiling with No Teeth by Genesis Owusu	"Smiling with No Teeth" by Genesis Owusu	Telenova
2023	—N/a	King Stingray by King Stingray	"Get Inspired" by Genesis Owusu	King Stingray
2024	—N/a	Brain Worms by RVG	"King of Disappointment" by Jem Cassar-Daley	Royel Otis
2025	—N/a	Cartoon Darkness by Amyl and the Sniffers	"U Should Not Be Doing That" by Amyl and the Sniffers	Miss Kaninna

== See also ==
- Music of Australia
