= List of number-one Australian Artist albums of 2025 =

The ARIA Charts ranks the best-performing albums in Australia. Its data, published by the Australian Recording Industry Association, is based collectively on the weekly streams and digital and physical sales of albums.

To be eligible to appear on the chart, the recording must be an album produced by an artist of Australian nationality. Starting from 8 September, ARIA changed the eligibility to require the album have been released in the last two years. Older albums were then placed on the On Replay Chart.

Key
†	Also the #1 album on the ARIA Albums Chart

== Chart history ==
List of number-one albums
Issue date	Song	Artist(s)	Ref.
6 January	"50 Years – The Best Of"	Cold Chisel	
13 January	"50 Years – The Best Of"	Cold Chisel	
20 January	"50 Years – The Best Of"	Cold Chisel	
27 January	"Toy"	Dear Seattle	
3 February	"Forgiving Spree"	Slowly Slowly	
10 February	"The Very Best"	INXS	
17 February	"The Very Best"	INXS	
24 February	"Light Hit My Face Like a Straight Right"	Mallrat	
3 March	"Recency Bias"	Rum Jungle	
10 March	"Hi Fi Way"	You Am I	
17 March	"Straight Into the Sun"	The Cruel Sea	
24 March	"Hi, It's Nice to Meet Me"	Mia Wray	
31 March	"Old Mervs"	Old Mervs	
7 April	"Backflips in a Restaurant"	Grentperez	
14 April	"Like Love"	Ball Park Music	
21 April	"The Moon (The Light Side)"	Bliss N Eso	
28 April	"Do What Ya Wanna"	Beddy Rays	
5 May	"50 Years - The Best Of"	Cold Chisel	
12 May	"Golden Wolf"	Dope Lemon	
19 May	"If That Makes Sense"	Spacey Jane	
26 May	"Was Here"	Stand Atlantic	
2 June	"Hymns for the Nonbeliever"	Kisschasy	
9 June	"Bliss Release"	Cloud Control	
16 June	"Defiant"	Jimmy Barnes	
23 June	"Order Chaos Order"	Calum Hood	
30 June	"Reflector"	Killing Heidi	
7 July	"The First Time"	The Kid Laroi	
14 July	"Shui"	Fangz	
21 July	"The Terrys"	The Terrys	
28 July	"The Very Best"	INXS	
4 August	"Time Machine"	Tim Minchin	
11 August	"Fall From the Light"	Hilltop Hoods	
18 August	"100 Times Around the Sun"	Guy Sebastian	
25 August	"Stay Relentless"	Justice for the Damned	
1 September	"Hickey"	Royel Otis	
8 September	"Australian Made"	The Wolfe Brothers	
15 September	"Prism"	John Butler	
22 September	"Hickey"	Royel Otis	
29 September	"Love Balloon"	Ocean Alley	
6 October	"The Moon (The Dark Side)"	Bliss N Eso	
13 October	"Everything Every Single Day"	The Rions	
20 October	"Longing"	Pete Murray	
27 October	"Deadbeat"	Tame Impala	
3 November	"Where You'll Find Me"	James Johnston	
10 November	"Tea & Sympathy"	Bernard Fanning	
17 November	"Seventy"	Paul Kelly	
24 November	"Everyone's a Star!"	5 Seconds of Summer	
1 December	"So Much For Second Chances"	SoSo	
8 December	"Moonrise"	Pierce Brothers	
15 December	"Kylie Christmas (Fully Wrapped)"	Kylie Minogue	
22 December	"Tripping Over Time"	Boy & Bear	
29 December	"Deadbeat"	Tame Impala	

== On Replay Chart ==
List of number-one albums
Issue date	Song	Artist(s)	Ref.
8 September	"Dream Your Life Away"	Vance Joy	
15 September	"PetroDragonic Apocalypse"	King Gizzard & the Lizard Wizard	
22 September	"PetroDragonic Apocalypse"	King Gizzard & the Lizard Wizard	
29 September	"Currents"	Tame Impala	
6 October	"Dream Your Life Away"	Vance Joy	
13 October	"Currents"	Tame Impala	
20 October	"Slightly Odway"	Jebediah	
27 October	"Drinking From the Sun"	Hilltop Hoods	
3 November	"Currents"	Tame Impala	
10 November	"Tea & Sympathy"	Bernard Fanning	
17 November	"Currents"	Tame Impala	
24 November	"For the Working Class Man"	Jimmy Barnes	
1 December	"For the Working Class Man"	Jimmy Barnes	
8 December	"Currents"	Tame Impala	
15 December	"Currents"	Tame Impala	
22 December	"Currents"	Tame Impala	
29 December	"Everyday Is Christmas"	Sia	

== Artists with multiple weeks ==
List of number-one artists, with total weeks spent at number one shown - charts combined
Position	Artist	Weeks at No. 1
1	Tame Impala	9
2	Cold Chisel	4
3	INXS	3
3	Jimmy Barnes	3
4	Bernard Fanning	2
4	Bliss N Eso	2
4	Hilltop Hoods	2
4	King Gizzard and the Lizard Wizard	2
4	Royel Otis	2
4	Vance Joy	2

== See also ==
- 2025 in music
