= Royel Otis discography =

- Studio albums: 2
- EPs: 3
- Singles: 28

Australian indie pop duo Royel Otis has released 2 studio albums, 3 extended plays and 28 singles.

Royel Otis have been nominated for many awards, including AIR Awards, APRA Awards and ARIA Music Awards, winning all of these at least once.

== Albums ==
List of albums, with selected details
Title	Details	Peak chart positions									
Title	Details	AUS	AUT	BEL (FL)	GER	NLD	NZ	SCO	SWI	UK	US
Pratts & Pain	Released: 16 February 2024; Format: CD, LP, digital; Label: Ourness (OURN3003.1)	10	—	—	—	—	—	—	—	— (Note: Pratts & Pain did not enter the UK Albums chart, but peaked at number 87 on the UK Album Sales chart.)	—
Hickey	Released: 22 August 2025; Format: CD, LP, digital; Label: Capitol (602478262814)	5	31	20	34	14	32	9	18	14	151
"—" denotes a recording that did not chart or was not released in that territory.

== Extended plays ==
List of EPs, with selected details
Title	EP details	Peak chart positions
Title	EP details	AUS
Campus	Released: 7 October 2021; Format: digital; Label: Ourness / House Anxiety	—
Bar n Grill	Released: 5 August 2022; Format: digital; Label: Ourness / House Anxiety	—
Sofa Kings	Released: 31 March 2023; Format: digital, LP; Label: Ourness / House Anxiety (OUREPV006)	43
Nashville Sessions	Released: 8 October 2024; Format: digital, LP (RSD 2025); Label: Ourness / Capitol	—
Live at The Greek	Released: 27 November 2026; Format: LP (RSD Black Friday Exclusive); Label: EMI	—
"—" denotes a recording that did not chart or was not released in that territory.

== Singles ==
List of singles, with year released, peak chart positions, and album name shown
Title	Year	Peak chart positions										Certifications	Album
Title	Year	AUS	CAN Rock	ICE	IRE	JPN Over.	NZ Hot	UK	UK Indie	US	US Rock	Certifications	Album
"Only One"	2021	—	—	—	—	—	—	—	—	—	—		Campus
"Without U"	2021	—	—	—	—	—	—	—	—	—	—		Campus
"Oysters in My Pocket"	2022	— (Note: "Oysters in My Pocket" did not enter the Australian top 100 Singles Chart, but peaked at number 23 on Australian Artist on Replay Singles Chart.)	—	—	—	—	—	—	— (Note: "Oysters in My Pocket" did not enter the UK Independent Singles chart, but peaked at number 20 on the UK Independent Singles Breakers chart.)	—	—	ARIA: Gold; BPI: Silver; RMNZ: Platinum	Bar n Grill
"Bull Breed"	2022	—	—	—	—	—	—	—	—	—	—		Bar n Grill
"Motels"	2022	—	—	—	—	—	—	—	—	—	—		Bar n Grill
"Kool Aid"	2022	—	—	—	—	—	—	—	—	—	—	RMNZ: Gold	Sofa Kings
"I Wanna Dance with You"	2023	—	—	—	—	—	—	—	—	—	—		Sofa Kings
"Sofa King"	2023	—	—	—	—	—	—	—	—	—	— (Note: "Sofa King" did not enter the Hot Rock & Alternative Songs chart, but peaked at number 33 on the Rock & Alternative Airplay chart.)	RMNZ: Gold	Sofa Kings
"Going Kokomo"	2023	—	—	—	—	—	—	—	—	—	—		Sofa Kings
"Adored"	2023	—	—	—	—	—	—	—	—	—	—		Pratts & Pain
"Fried Rice"	2023	—	—	—	—	—	—	—	—	—	—		Pratts & Pain
"Heading for the Door"	2023	—	—	—	—	—	—	—	—	—	—		Pratts & Pain
"Velvet"	2024	—	—	—	—	—	—	—	—	—	—		Pratts & Pain
"Murder on the Dancefloor" (Like a Version)	2024	35	29	—	—	—	14	—	—	—	41	ARIA: Platinum	Non-album single (Note: Later included on the 2025 compilation Triple J's Best Australian Like A Version)
"Foam"	2024	—	—	—	—	—	—	—	—	—	—		Pratts & Pain
"Claw Foot"	2024	—	—	—	—	—	—	—	—	—	—		Pratts & Pain
"Linger" (SiriusXM Session)	2024	37	—	—	63	—	11	84	17	94	16	BPI: Silver; RMNZ: Gold	Non-album single
"Nack Nostalgia"	2024	—	—	—	—	—	—	—	—	—	—		Bose x NME: C24 Mixtape
"Til the Morning"	2024	—	—	—	—	—	—	—	—	—	—		Pratts & Pain (extended)
"Merry Mary Marry Me"	2024	—	—	—	—	—	—	—	—	—	—		Pratts & Pain (extended)
"If Our Love Is Dead"	2024	—	—	—	—	—	37	—	—	—	—		Pratts & Pain (deluxe)
"Moody"	2025	— (Note: "Moody" did not enter the Australian top 100 Singles Chart, but peaked at number 16 on Australian Artist Chart.)	7	40	—	—	20	— (Note: "Moody" did not enter the UK Singles chart, but peaked at number 11 on the UK Physical Singles chart.)	—	— (Note: "Moody" did not enter the Hot 100, but peaked at number one on the Alternative Airplay. Royel Otis became the first act to score an initial No. 1 on Adult Alternative Airplay in 2025.)	— (Note: "Moody" did not enter the Hot Rock & Alternative Songs chart, but peaked at number nine on the Rock & Alternative Airplay chart.)		Hickey
"Car"	2025	— (Note: "Moody" did not enter the Australian top 100 Singles Chart, but peaked at number 10 on Australian Artist Chart.)	—	—	—	18	37	—	—	—	—		Hickey
"Say Something"	2025	—	—	—	—	11	40	—	—	—	—		Hickey
"Who's Your Boyfriend"	2025	—	13	—	—	8	21	—	—	—	— (Note: "Who's Your Boyfriend" did not enter the Hot Rock & Alternative Songs chart, but peaked at number 50 on the Rock & Alternative Airplay chart.)		Hickey
"I Hate This Tune"	2025	—	—	—	—	—	—	—	—	—	—		Hickey
"Sweet Hallelujah"	2026	—	—	—	—	20	32	—	—	—	—		TBA
"—" denotes a recording that did not chart or was not released in that territory.

=== Triple J Hottest 100 ===
The Triple J Hottest 100 is an annual music poll presented by the Australian radio station Triple J.

Single	Year	Position
"Sofa King"	2023	76
"Going Kokomo"	2023	110
"Fried Rice"	2023	151
"I Wanna Dance With You"	2023	153
"Murder on the Dancefloor" (Like a Version)	2024	2
"Heading for the Door"	2024	39
"Foam"	2024	44
"If Our Love Is Dead"	2024	86
"Claw Foot"	2024	110
"Til The Morning"	2024	131
"Linger" (SiriusXM Session)	2024	196
"Car"	2025	21
"Moody"	2025	34
"Who's Your Boyfriend"	2025	35
"Say Something"	2025	54
