= Carparks =

Studio album by Old Mervs
- Released: 2 October 2026
- Length: 39:08
- Label: Dew Process
- Producer: Chris Collins

Old Mervs chronology
Old Mervs (2025)	Carparks (2026)

Singles from Carparks
- 1. "Heavy in the Morning" Released: 18 March 2026; 2. "Tether" Released: 15 May 2026; 3. "She Said" Released: 10 July 2026; 4. "Old Friend" Released: 28 August 2026; 5. "Adeline" Released: 2 October 2026

Carparks is the second studio album by Australian independent rock duo Old Mervs. It was announced in July 2026 alongside the third single and released on 2 October 2026.

The album will be supported with an Australian and New Zealand tour in October and November 2026. Drummer Henry Carrington-Jones said: "We've been sitting on the album for months and months. More than anything, we're stoked to get out and play some new songs and change the set up. As good as it is releasing, it's always the funnest part playing them."

== Reception ==
Tobias Handke from The Note described the album as "A collection of retrospective songs capturing the highs and lows of touring the globe".

Sarah Duggan from The Music said "It's unmistakably an Old Mervs record, but there's a little more maturity in the songwriting and a willingness to stretch the sound without losing the character that's at the centre of the band."

== Track listing ==
1. "Adeline" – 3:00
2. "Old Friend" – 3:45
3. "Abbey's Wine" – 3:39
4. "Heavy in the Morning" – 2:51
5. "Tether" – 4:11
6. "Once More" – 2:44
7. "She Said" – 3:12
8. "The Balcony Song" – 3:16
9. "Stacked Up" – 3:09
10. "One Way Road" – 3:37
11. "The Hills" (with Kim Churchill) – 3:00
12. "For You" – 2:44

== Charts ==
Chart performance for Carparks
Chart (2026)	Peak position
Australian Albums (ARIA)	16
