= Last of Your Kind =

Studio album by The Vanns
- Released: 19 May 2023
- Studio: The Music Farm, Byron Bay, Australia
- Length: 55:35
- Label: Upper River Records
- Producer: Chris Collins

The Vanns chronology
Through the Walls (2019)	Last of Your Kind (2023)	All That's in My Head (2025)

Last of Your Kind is the second studio album by Australian indie rock group The Vanns. The album was released in May 2023 and peaked at number 8 on the ARIA Charts; their first charting release.

Upon announcement the group said "The idea behind Last of Your Kind and a message throughout the album is living the most fruitful and spontaneous life you possibly can, in saying that, there is also no hiding the fact that we can all hit rock bottom, but you will always make it out the other side."

== Reception ==
Vasili Papathanasopoulos from Milky Milky Milky said "Thematically Last of Your Kind encapsulates the human experience, with a driven focus on relationships, mental health, spontaneity and endurance. Relatable and introspective lyricism is brought to life by frontman Jimmy Vann's hypnotic vocal performance, whilst the record darts between blazing soundscapes and intimate moments that showcase the depth and breadth of their musicianship."

Conor Lochrie from Rolling Stone Australia gave the album 2.5 out of 5 and said "Like their contemporaries Spacey Jane — or any number of unsubtle US rockers — they know how to craft songs for singalongs, filled with steamrolling percussion, rousing vocals and climactic guitar lines."

== Track listing ==
All Songs Written and Performed By The Vanns.

1. "Last of Your Kind" - 5:05
2. "Haunted" - 4:27
3. "Ever" - 3:50
4. "Thinkin 'Bout the Nights" - 5:05
5. "Silhouette" - 4:28
6. "Settle Me Down" - 6:29
7. "Feels Good Now" - 4:12
8. "Checking Out" - 3:45
9. "Red Light" - 4:06
10. "True Friends" - 3:29
11. "Making It Out Alive" - 4:52
12. "Collide" - 5:41

== Weekly charts ==
Weekly chart performance for Last of Your Kind
Chart (2023)	Peak position
Australian Albums (ARIA)	8
