= Harry O'Brien =

Harry O'Brien may refer to:

- Harry J. O'Brien, American football, basketball, and baseball coach
- Héritier Lumumba (born 1986), Australian rules footballer, formerly known as Harry O'Brien
- Harry O'Brien (musician), Australian vocalist and member of Pacific Avenue
