= All That's in My Head =

Studio album by The Vanns
- Released: 1 August 2025
- Recorded: London (England), Wollongong (Australia)
- Length: 46:23
- Label: Upper River
- Producer: Oscar Dawson

The Vanns chronology
Last of Your Kind (2023)	All That's in My Head (2025)

All That's in My Head is the third studio album by Australian indie rock group The Vanns. The album was announced in June 2025 and released on 1 August 2025. The album will be supported by a 20-date Australian tour took place from October 2025 to January 2026.

== Track listing ==
All songs written by the Vanns.

1. "Accomplice" – 4:43
2. "Golden Eyes" – 4:32
3. "For God's Sake" – 4:14
4. "In and Out" – 4:14
5. "Gas Craic" – 4:46
6. "You Are All That's in My Head" – 3:54
7. "Feather" – 3:49
8. "Strangers to Neighbours" – 3:53
9. "Up All Night" – 3:38
10. "Millionaires" – 4:40
11. "Read My Mind" – 3:57

== Charts ==
Chart performance for All That's in My Head
Chart (2025)	Peak position
Australian Albums (ARIA)	27
