= Oysters in My Pocket =

Single by Royel Otis

from the EP Bar n Grill
- Released: 10 March 2022
- Length: 2:42
- Label: Ourness
- Songwriters: Royel Maddell, Otis Pavlovic, Chris Collins
- Producer: Chris Collins

Royel Otis singles chronology
"Without U" (2021)	"Oysters in My Pocket" (2022)	"Bull Breed" (2022)

"Oysters in My Pocket" is a song by Australian duo Royel Otis. It was released on 10 March 2022 as the lead single from their second extended play, Bar n Grill. The song was certified gold in Australia in 2024.

Upon release, the duo said "'Oysters in My Pocket' is our way of showing appreciation to the bivalve molluscs that put some boost in our juice and some fire in the libido. Each one as unique as our very own fingertips. Heck don't pass up an opportunity when you come across these suckers. Stuff them in your pockets and be the life of any party."

== Reception ==
Arun Kendall from Backseat Mafia called the song an "intravenous shot of pure happiness", saying "There's shouty, rowdy delivery skipping over a riffy layering of guitars and a whole heap of clattering bounce that brings a smile to the dourest of visages."

Vasili Papathanasopoulos from Milky Milky Milky said "Continuing their exploration of dream-pop sonics, vocalist Otis Pavlovic's mesmerising vocals float above hypnotic percussion and nostalgia drenched guitar lines."

== Certifications ==
Region	Certification	Certified units/sales
Australia (ARIA)	Gold	35,000^{‡}
New Zealand (RMNZ)	Platinum	30,000^{‡}
^{‡} Sales+streaming figures based on certification alone.
