= Flowers (Pacific Avenue album) =

Studio album by Pacific Avenue
- Released: 5 May 2023
- Length: 42:05
- Label: BMG
- Producer: Chris Collins

Pacific Avenue chronology
| Strawberry Skies (2019) | Flowers (2023) | Lovesick Sentimental (2026) |

Singles from Flowers
- 1. "Easy Love" Released: 30 April 2021; 2. "Give It Up for Yourself" Released: 29 April 2022; 3. "Leaving for London" Released: 26 August 2022; 4. "Spin Me Like Your Records" Released: 10 February 2023; 5. "Strawberry Daydream" Released: 5 May 2023

Singles from Flowers (Deluxe)
- 1. "California Blues" Released: 15 December 2023

Flowers is the debut studio album by Australian alternative rock group Pacific Avenue. It was released on 5 May 2023 and peaked at number 3 on the ARIA Charts. A deluxe edition was released on 15 December 2023, featuring five extra tracks.

At the 2023 ARIA Music Awards, the album earned the group a nomination for was nominated for Michael Gudinski Breakthrough Artist. The album was nominated for Best Rock Album.

At the AIR Awards of 2024, the album was nominated for Best Independent Rock Album or EP.

== Background ==
The album was announced in February 2023, alongside "Spin Me Like Your Records",

The album was supported by the Flowers Australia tour, commencing in Perth on 28 July 2023.

== Production ==
The first single, "Easy Love" was produced by Jack Nigro, while Chris Collins, who produced the band's April 2022 single "Give it up for yourself", produced the rest of the album. Recording took place at five studios, but most of it was done "the music farm", in the hinterland of Byron Bay.

== Reception ==
Professional ratings
Review scores
| Source | Rating |
|---|---|
| 13th Floor | 4/5 stars |
| New Sounds | 3/5 |

Simon Coffey from 13th Floor called Flowers "a fun album, full of energy, hooks and good quality indie Aussie rock".

Tabitha Wilson from New Sounds felt that "Flowers, for a debut album, is a very impressive piece of work. It is repetitive at times, and it is evident that Pacific Avenue are still discovering their own sound, but that is to be expected – and they definitely have a promising future ahead of them."

Triple J said the group "have produced a sun soaked, rock 'n' roll record that seamlessly mixes new ideas with classic sounds, delivering a record that feels instantly memorable, uplifting and joyous."

== Track listing ==
Standard edition

1. "Spin Me Like Your Records" – 3:11
2. "Strawberry Daydream" – 3:07
3. "Easy Love" – 3:56
4. "Wake Me Up" – 3:02
5. "Give It Up for Yourself" – 3:07
6. "Leaving for London" – 3:41
7. "City Lights" – 2:46
8. "Get You Off" – 3:33
9. "Someone's Asking" – 3:52
10. "Modern Lovers" – 3:50
11. "Devotion" – 3:36
12. "Lay Me Down" – 4:24

Deluxe edition

1. "California Blues" – 2:01
2. "Starman" – 4:02
3. "Waking Up the Neighbourhood" – 3:12
4. "Cigarette Song" – 4:42
5. "Superbloom" – 2:06

== Charts ==
Chart performance for Flowers
| Chart (2023) | Peak position |
|---|---|
| Australian Albums (ARIA) | 3 |
