= The Death of Me (Polaris album) =

2020 studio album by Australian band Polaris

Studio album by Polaris
- Released: 21 February 2020
- Recorded: Mollymook beach, NSW
- Genres: Metalcore; progressive metalcore
- Length: 41:47
- Labels: Resist; SharpTone
- Producers: Polaris; Lance Prenc; Scottie Simpson

Polaris chronology
The Mortal Coil (2017)	The Death of Me (2020)	Fatalism (2023)

Singles from The Death of Me
- 1. "Masochist" Released: November 6, 2019; 2. "Hypermania" Released: January 8, 2020; 3. "Landmine" Released: February 13, 2020

Professional ratings
Review scores
Source	Rating
Depth Magazine	8/10
Kerrang!	4/5 stars
New Transcendence	9/10
Sputnikmusic	4/5 stars
Wall of Sound	10/10

The Death of Me is the second studio album by Australian metalcore band Polaris. The band produced and recorded in Mollymook Beach NSW with Lance Prenc and Scottie Simpson engineering, and it was mixed by Carson Slovak and Grant McFarland of Atrium Audio at Think Loud Studios, PA, USA. The album was released on 21 February 2020 under Resist Records and SharpTone Records and has been nominated for an ARIA Award for Best Hard Rock or Heavy Metal Album. The album was nominated for Best Album at the 2021 Rolling Stone Australia Awards.

At the AIR Awards of 2021, the album won Best Independent Heavy Album or EP.

== Chart performance ==
The album debuted at number 3 on the Australian ARIA charts and at number 39 in Germany.

== Tour ==
On 14 November 2019, the band announced a tour for February 2020 in support of the album, which featured the bands Wage War, Crystal Lake and Alpha Wolf.

== Track listing ==
The Death of Me track listing
No.	Title	Length
1.	"Pray for Rain"	4:45
2.	"Hypermania"	2:42
3.	"Masochist"	4:08
4.	"Landmine"	3:49
5.	"Vagabond"	4:17
6.	"Creatures of Habit"	4:20
7.	"Above My Head"	4:42
8.	"Martyr (Waves)"	3:50
9.	"All of This Is Fleeting"	3:56
10.	"The Descent"	5:18
Total length:		41:47

== Personnel ==
Credits adapted from Discogs.

Polaris

- Daniel Furnari – drums
- Jamie Hails – vocals
- Rick Schneider – rhythm guitar
- Jake Steinhauser – bass, vocals
- Ryan Siew – lead guitar

Additional personnel

- Lance Prenc – production, engineering
- Scottie Simpson – production, engineering
- Carson Slovak – mixing, mastering
- Grand McFarland – mixing, mastering
- Daniel Anderson – art direction, photography
- Pat Fox – layout, design
- Graham Nixon – management

== Charts ==
Chart performance for The Death of Me
Chart (2020)	Peak position
Australian Albums (ARIA)	3
German Albums (Offizielle Top 100)	39
US Heatseekers Albums (Billboard)	17

== Awards ==
=== AIR Awards ===
The Australian Independent Record Awards (known colloquially as the AIR Awards) is an annual awards night to recognise, promote and celebrate the success of Australia's Independent Music sector.

Year	Nominee / work	Award	Result	Ref.
2021	The Death of Me	Best Independent Heavy Album or EP	Won	

=== ARIA Music Awards ===
The ARIA Music Awards is an annual awards ceremony that recognises excellence, innovation, and achievement across all genres of Australian music.

Year	Nominee / work	Award	Result
2020	The Death of Me	Best Hard Rock/Heavy Metal Album	Nominated

=== Rolling Stone Australia Awards ===
Year	Nominee / work	Award	Result
Rolling Stone Australia Awards 2021	The Death of Me	Best Record	Nominated

== Release history ==
Region	Date	Format	Label	Catalogue
Australia	21 February 2020	CD; digital download; streaming; LP	Resist Records	RES180
Worldwide	21 February 2020	CD; digital download; streaming; LP	SharpTone Records	5356
