= Polaris (Australian band) =

Australian metalcore band

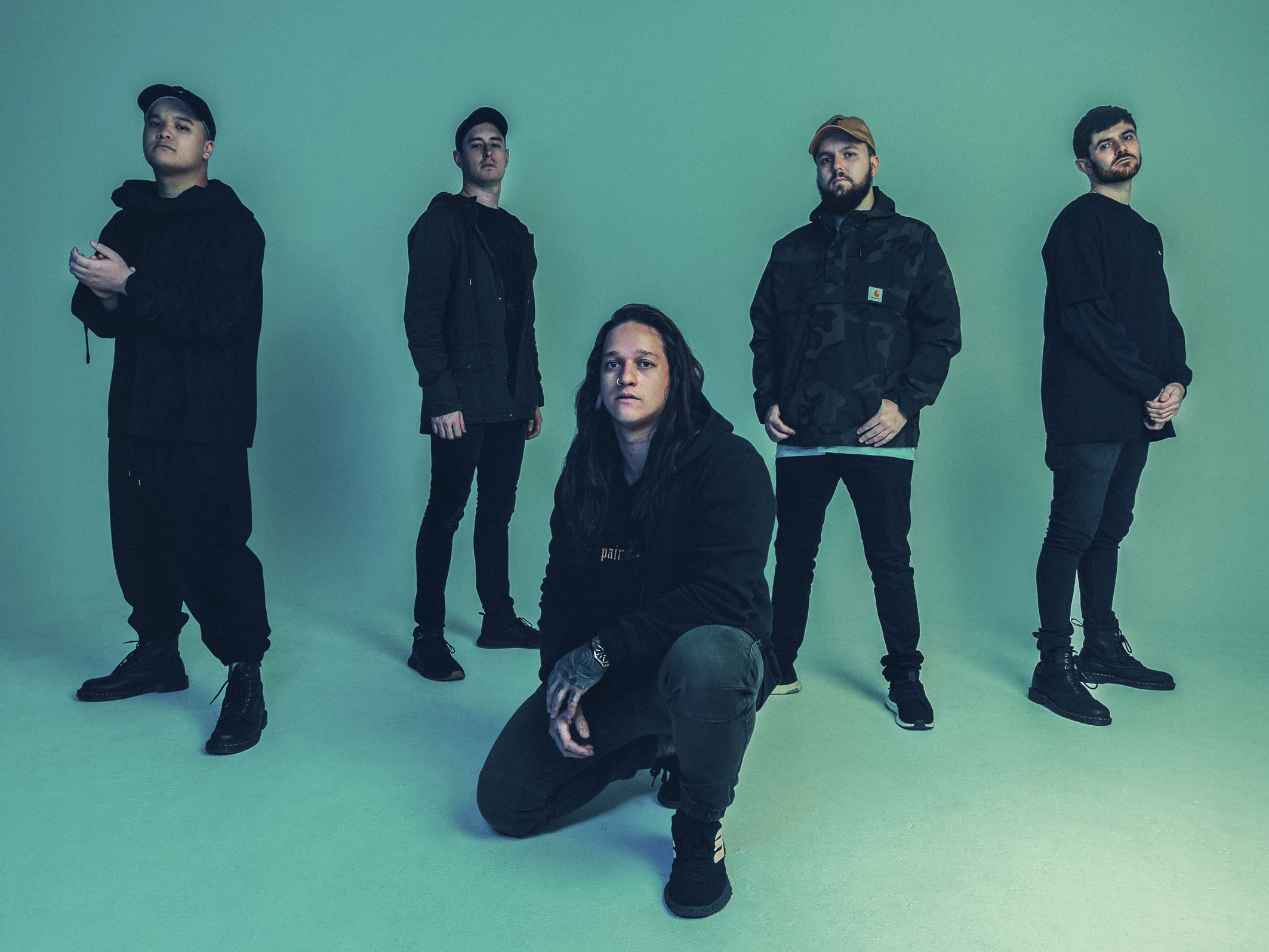

Background information
- Origin: Sydney, Australia
- Genres: Metalcore; progressive metalcore
- Years active: 2012–present
- Labels: Resist; SharpTone
- Members: Jamie Hails; Daniel Furnari; Rick Schneider; Jake Steinhauser
- Past members: James West; Matt Steinhauser; Ryan Siew
- Website: polarisaus.com

Polaris are an Australian metalcore band from Sydney. The band consists of vocalist Jamie Hails, guitarist Rick Schneider, bassist/vocalist Jake Steinhauser and drummer Daniel Furnari.

They released their debut album, The Mortal Coil on 3 November 2017 to critical acclaim and it was nominated for the 2018 ARIA Award for Best Hard Rock. On 14 November 2019 Polaris announced their second full length titled The Death of Me, released on 21 February 2020 through Resist/SharpTone records subsequently earning their second ARIA Award nomination. Shortly after announcing the upcoming release of their third studio album, Fatalism, the band confirmed via social media platforms that lead guitarist Ryan Siew had died on 19 June 2023.

Polaris are known for their metalcore and progressive metalcore sound with progressive and ambient soundscapes, electronics and melodic hooks, intertwined with personal lyrics – often dealing with anxiety, depression and loss.

== History ==
=== Early career and Dichotomy (2012–2013) ===
Polaris was formed in 2012 by drummer Daniel Furnari and guitarist Jake Steinhauser after meeting at their high school battle of the bands, quickly discovering a mutual love for metal and alternative music. Josh O'loughlin was the first main vocalist. The two then recruited guitarist Rick Schneider and vocalist Jamie Hails through mutual friends and word of mouth. Matt Steinhauser, Jake's brother, was brought on board to handle bass duties and completed the line-up with James West on synth/keys. The group began working on music together writing and recording their first single "Summit" and the majority of the Dichotomy EP in early 2012. In late 2012, Polaris announced the departure of both Matt Steinhauser and West. Guitarist Jake then switched onto bass to focus on his singing, as the band was pushing towards a more progressive sound.

The band began looking for a new guitarist, holding public auditions. On 18 November 2013, the band announced Ryan Siew, as their new guitarist, who was 15 years old at the time. Shortly after joining the Dichotomy EP was released on 29 November 2013 independently.

=== The Guilt and The Grief (2014–2016) ===
On 3 March 2015, the single "Unfamiliar" was released; it was the first track to feature Siew as lead guitarist. Polaris continued to write and finished an additional 5 tracks to complete their second EP titled The Guilt & The Grief. The EP was recorded with Sonny True Love and Evan Lee at STL studios on the North Coast of NSW, and it was mixed by Carson Slovak and Grant McFarland of Atrium Audio in Pennsylvania, USA. The Guilt & The Grief was released independently by the band on 29 January 2016 and landed at No. 34 on the ARIA charts.

=== The Mortal Coil (2017–2018) ===
On 3 November 2017, Polaris released their first studio album The Mortal Coil through Resist Records and Sharptone Records. The album was nominated for the 2018 ARIA Award for Best Hard Rock or Heavy Metal Album as well as for the Australian Album of the Year award at the J Awards.

=== The Death of Me (2019–2022) ===
On 21 February 2020, Polaris released their second studio album The Death of Me, also through Resist Records and Sharptone Records. The album was nominated for the 2020 ARIA Award for Best Hard Rock or Heavy Metal Album. On 3 July 2020, the band released the instrumental editions of their albums, The Mortal Coil and The Death of Me.

In an interview with Wall of Sound, Jamie Hails confirmed the band have been working on new material during the pandemic, which they would not be releasing until they have toured The Death of Me internationally.

On 27 July 2022, Australian electronic artist and producer PhaseOne released a collaboration track with the band entitled "Icarus", marking the first time the band have collaborated with another artist on new music.

On 4 November 2022, Polaris announced via social media "We have entered the studio to begin assembling our next body of work" with their live sound engineer Lance Prenc at Kinglake Studios in Melbourne.

=== Fatalism and Siew's death (2023–present) ===
On 24 May 2023, Polaris announced on social media that their new song "Inhumane" would debut on radio station Triple J on 25 May at 4:30 pm. The song had previously been played live on their ten-year anniversary Australian tour. Upon "Inhumane"'s release, the band announced their third studio album Fatalism, which was set to be released on 1 September. The following week, a headlining Australian tour was announced with August Burns Red, Kublai Khan Tx and Currents. The band then headed to Europe for a run of festival dates with then-Windwaker guitarist Jesse Crofts filling in as guitarist Ryan Siew dealt with ongoing health issues. On 20 June, however, Polaris announced via social media that they were "withdrawing from all remaining dates" of their tour due to a "serious personal crisis", and on 27 June 2023, the band confirmed via social media platforms that Siew had died on the morning of 19 June.

The following month, on July 24, the band announced that they would be going forward with the release of Fatalism and its accompanying tour in honour of Siew, after lengthy discussions between the band and Siew's family. "This is the last set of complete songs that we wrote together with Ryan," the band said, "and though the circumstances of their release are now framed by this tragedy, the meaning of the songs and the love we have for them has not changed." The album's second single, "Nightmare", was released later that week on 26 July. On 24 August, the band released the album's third single, "Overflow", ahead of the album's official release on 1 September. Fatalism debuted at number one on the ARIA Albums Chart the week of its release, marking the band's first-ever chart-topping album.

On 23 March 2024, the band announced that drummer Daniel Furnari was withdrawing from the European leg of the Fatalism tour due to ill health and replaced by Conjurer drummer Noah See. Furnari would return to the lineup for the band's tour of regional Australia with Ocean Grove, as well as Sydney bands Bloom and Inertia.

On 16 October 2024, Knotfest announced that Polaris would join the lineup for their 2025 Australian festival. In a February 2025 interview with The Music, vocalist Jamie Hails revealed that the band was in the early stages of writing new music, and that touring guitarist Jesse Crofts has been included in their songwriting sessions.

On 5 September 2025, two years after the album's original release, the band released the instrumental version of Fatalism.

Following this release, the band was announced as the special guest for Linkin Park on the Australian leg of the "From Zero" world tour.

A month later in October 2025, it was confirmed that the band would support Electric Callboy on the North American dates of their 2026 "Tanzneid World Tour" alongside Scene Queen. It would mark their first shows back in the United States since 2024. As part of the tour, the band played at Welcome to Rockville, which took place in Daytona Beach, Florida, and the Sonic Temple festival in May 2026.

On 24 April 2026, vocalist Jamie Hails was featured on the August Burns Red song "Sonic Salvation" from their album Season of Surrender.

In April 2026, drummer Daniel Furnari said that the band had begun work on a new album which would push their sound into "new territory" with "some of the least metal moments on there, while also featuring some of our most metal moments you’ve ever heard from us."

Beginning on 24 August 2026, the band began posting a series of cryptic graphics, which gradually revealed the phrase "The Dark Grows Near Without You Here." Subsequently, in an email to its fans on 28 August 2026, the band confirmed that the first single off its upcoming fourth studio album would be called "Without You" which was released on 2 September 2026.

== Band members ==
Current members

- Jamie Hails – unclean vocals, percussion (2012–present)
- Rick Schneider – rhythm guitar (2013–present), lead guitar (2012–2013)
- Jake Steinhauser – clean vocals (2012–present), bass (2013–present), rhythm guitar (2012–2013)
- Daniel Furnari – drums (2012–present)

Current touring musicians

- Jesse Crofts – lead guitar (2023–present)

Former members

- James West – synthesizer, keyboards (2012–2014)
- Matt Steinhauser – bass (2012–2013)
- Ryan Siew – lead guitar (2013–2023; his death)

Former touring musicians

- Plini Roessler-Holgate – lead guitar (2020; substitute for Ryan Siew)
- Noah See – drums (2024; substitute for Daniel Furnari)
- Ryan Neff – bass, clean vocals (2026; substitute for Jake Steinhauser)
- Julian Latouche – unclean vocals (2026; substitute for Jamie Hails)

Timeline

== Discography ==
=== Studio albums ===
List of studio albums
Title	Details	Peak chart positions	
Title	Details	AUS	GER
The Mortal Coil	Released: 3 November 2017; Label: Resist, SharpTone; Formats: CD, digital download, vinyl	6	—
The Death of Me	Released: 21 February 2020; Label: Resist, SharpTone; Formats: CD, digital download, vinyl	3	39
Fatalism	Released: 1 September 2023; Label: Resist, SharpTone; Formats: CD, digital download, vinyl	1	25

=== EPs ===
List of EPs
Title	Details	Peak chart positions
Title	Details	AUS
Dichotomy	Released: 29 November 2013; Label: Independent; Formats: CD, digital download; Tracklisting: 1. In Memoria Di; 2. Aspirations; 3. Deliverance; 4. The Undertow; 5. In Parallel; 6. Wherever I May Walk	—
The Guilt & the Grief	Released: 29 January 2016; Label: Independent; Formats: CD, digital download; Tracklisting: 1. Regress; 2. L'appel du vide 3. Unfamiliar; 4. Voiceless; 5. No Rest; 6. Hold You Under (feat. Marcus Bridge of Northlane)	34

=== Certified singles ===
Title	Year	Certifications	Album
"The Remedy"	2017	ARIA: Gold	The Mortal Coil
"Masochist"	2019	ARIA: Gold	The Death of Me

== Awards and nominations ==
=== AIR Awards ===
The Australian Independent Record Awards (known colloquially as the AIR Awards) is an annual awards night to recognise, promote and celebrate the success of Australia's Independent Music sector.

Year	Nominee / work	Award	Result	Ref.
2021	The Death of Me	Best Independent Heavy Album or EP	Won	
2024	Fatalism	Best Independent Heavy Album or EP	Won	

=== APRA Awards ===
The APRA Awards are presented annually from 1982 by the Australasian Performing Right Association (APRA), "honouring composers and songwriters". They commenced in 1982.

Year	Nominee / work	Award	Result	Ref.
2021	"Masochist" (Jamie Hails, Daniel Furnari, Rick Schneider, Ryan Siew, Jacob Steinhauser)	Song of the Year	Shortlisted	
2024	"Inhumane" (Daniel Furnari, Jamie Hails, Rick Schneider, Ryan Siew, Jacob Steinhauser, Shawn Mayer)	Song of the Year	Shortlisted	
2024	"Inhumane" (Daniel Furnari, Jamie Hails, Rick Schneider, Ryan Siew, Jacob Steinhauser, Shawn Mayer)	Most Performed Hard Rock / Heavy Metal Work	Nominated	
2025	"Nightmare" (Daniel Furnari, Jamie Hails, Rick Schneider, Ryan Siew, Jacob Steinhauser)	Most Performed Hard Rock / Heavy Metal Work	Nominated	

=== ARIA Music Awards ===
The ARIA Music Awards is an annual awards ceremony that recognises excellence, innovation, and achievement across all genres of Australian music.

Year	Nominee / work	Award	Result
2018	The Mortal Coil	Best Hard Rock/Heavy Metal Album	Nominated
2020	The Death of Me	Best Hard Rock/Heavy Metal Album	Nominated
2024	Fatalism	Best Hard Rock/Heavy Metal Album	Nominated

=== Australian Music Prize ===
The Australian Music Prize (the AMP) is an annual award of $30,000 given to an Australian band or solo artist in recognition of the merit of an album released during the year of award. It exists to discover, reward and promote new Australian music of excellence.

Year	Nominee / work	Award	Result	Ref.
2023	Fatalism	Australian Music Prize	Nominated	

=== J Awards ===
The J Awards are an annual series of Australian music awards that were established by the Australian Broadcasting Corporation's youth-focused radio station Triple J. They commenced in 2005.

Year	Nominee / work	Award	Result	Ref.
2018	The Mortal Coil	Australian Album of the Year	Nominated	
2023	Fatalism	Australian Album of the Year	Nominated	

=== National Live Music Awards ===
The National Live Music Awards (NLMAs) commenced in 2016 to recognise contributions to the live music industry in Australia.

Year	Nominee / work	Award	Result	Ref.
2023	Polaris	Best Hard Rock or Heavy Metal Act	Nominated	

=== Rolling Stone Australia Awards ===
The Rolling Stone Australia Awards are awarded annually in January or February by the Australian edition of Rolling Stone magazine for outstanding contributions to popular culture in the previous year.

Year	Nominee / work	Award	Result	Ref.
2021	The Death of Me	Best Record	Nominated	
