= The Real Thing: Symphonic Concert =

Live album by Russell Morris
- Released: 6 October 2023
- Recorded: 4 July 2023
- Venue: Hamer Hall, Melbourne
- Label: Ambition
- Producer: Michael Cristiano

Russell Morris chronology
Ghost Legends (2023)	The Real Thing: Symphonic Concert (2023)

The Real Thing: Symphonic Concert is a live album by Australian singer-songwriter Russell Morris, released on 2×CD on 6 October, on 2×LP on 3 November 2023 and on DVD on 5 July 2024. It was recorded on 4 July 2023 at Hamer Hall, Melbourne, and announced on 10 July.

Upon announcement, Morris said "Performing my songs in front of 65 musicians in July was a career highlight that I could never have imagined. David Hirschfelder has done a spectacular job turning my songs into orchestral arrangements, they sound truly amazing."

At the AIR Awards of 2024, the album was nominated for Best Independent Classical Album or EP.

== Background ==
In April 2023, Morris announced two planned performances with symphony orchestras; one at the Sydney Opera House and one at Hamer Hall, Melbourne on 2 and 4 July 2023. The performances were scored by David Hirschfelder with Morris accompanied with a 54-piece orchestra and a 10-member band. The concerts were produced by Australian independent producer Phil Bathols.

In August 2023, Morris announced encore performances between October and December 2023 in Melbourne, Perth, Adelaide, Sydney and Brisbane.

== Reception ==
Writing for Stack Magazine, Jeff Jenkins commented that "the 22 songs span 55 years" and wrote that "a standout is the long-forgotten 1970 single 'Mr. America', whose heavy riffing soars in the orchestral setting". Jenkins concluded, "This collection shows that Russell Morris has a remarkable catalogue".

Paul Cashmere from Noise11 felt that "the dynamic between the orchestra and the rock band makes for an astonishing live experience. When you take already powerful songs and elevate them with the power of 54 more musicians it creates an out of body experience with the songs."

== Track listing ==
CD1 / LP1
No.	Title	Writer(s)	Length
1.	"Overture / Part Three into Paper Walls"	Russell Morris & Johnny Young	9:31
2.	"Only a Matter of Time"	Hans Poulsen	1:34
3.	"A Thousand Suns"	Morris & Chong Lim	4:58
4.	"Black Dog Blues"	Morris & Jim Keays	4:11
5.	"The Drifter"	Morris & Garry Paige	4:03
6.	"The Girl That I Love"	Young	3:30
7.	"Dance with Me Now"	Morris	4:23
8.	"Van Diemen's Land"	Morris & Shannon Bourne	4:46
9.	"Rachel"	Raymond Froggatt	3:38
10.	"Nights in White Satin"	Justin Hayward	4:00
11.	"Mr. America"	Morris	4:04

CD2 / LP2
No.	Title	Writer(s)	Length
1.	"It's All Over Now, Baby Blue"	Bob Dylan	4:01
2.	"Squizzy"	Morris	3:55
3.	"Sandakan"	Morris	4:22
4.	"Doctor in the House"	Morris	4:12
5.	"I Will Wait for You" (with Jason Vorherr)	Morris & Peter Robinson	3:45
6.	"Blown Away"	Morris & Robinson	3:51
7.	"As Far As I Remember"	Morris & Robinson	4:05
8.	"Hush"	Joe South	4:45
9.	"The Real Thing"	Young	6:55
10.	"Wings of an Eagle"	Morris	4:51
11.	"Sweet, Sweet Love"	Morris	4:48

== Charts ==
Chart performance for The Real Thing: Symphonic Concert
Chart (2023)	Peak position
Australian Albums (ARIA)	5

== Release history ==
Release history and formats for The Real Thing: Symphonic Concert
Region	Date	Format	Label	Catalogue
Australia	6 October 2023	2×CD; digital download	Ambition	AMBITION220
Australia	3 November 2023	2×LP	Ambition	AMBITION220V
Australia	5 July 2024	DVD	Ambition	AMBITION220D
