= Fatalism (album) =

2023 studio album by Australian band Polaris

Studio album by Polaris
- Released: 1 September 2023
- Recorded: 2022
- Genre: Metalcore
- Length: 46:11
- Labels: Resist; SharpTone
- Producers: Polaris; Lance Prenc; Scottie Simpson

Polaris chronology
The Death of Me (2020)	Fatalism (2023)

Singles from Fatalism
- 1. "Inhumane" Released: 26 May 2023; 2. "Nightmare" Released: 27 July 2023; 3. "Overflow" Released: 24 August 2023; 4. "Dissipate" Released: 10 May 2024

Professional ratings
Review scores
Source	Rating
Distorted Sound	9/10
Kerrang!	4/5
The Music	4.5/5 stars
Wall of Sound	9/10

Fatalism is the third studio album by Australian metalcore band Polaris. The band produced and recorded the album in Melbourne in 2022 with Lance Prenc engineering and Alpha Wolf guitarist Scottie Simpson on vocal recording duties. The album was released on 1 September 2023 under Resist Records and SharpTone Records. It is the band's final album with lead guitarist Ryan Siew, after his death on 19 June 2023, with his recordings completed beforehand and released posthumously.

At the 2023 J Awards, the album was nominated for Australian Album of the Year.

The album was nominated for the 2023 Australian Music Prize.

At the AIR Awards of 2024, the album was nominated for Best Independent Heavy Album or EP.

At the 2024 ARIA Music Awards, the album was nominated for Best Hard Rock/Heavy Metal Album.

== Background ==
The first single from Polaris' then-upcoming album was "Inhumane", released on 26 May 2023. The band was performing the European leg of their ten-year anniversary tour until 20 June when Polaris announced the cancellation of the tour due to a personal crisis, which was announced on 27 June to be Ryan Siew's death at the age of 26 on 19 June. No cause of death was revealed. The following month, on 24 July, the band announced that they would be going forward with the release of Fatalism and its accompanying tour in honour of Siew, after lengthy discussions between the band and Siew's family. "This is the last set of complete songs that we wrote together with Ryan," the band said in a statement, "and though the circumstances of their release are now framed by this tragedy, the meaning of the songs and the love we have for them has not changed." The album's second single, "Nightmare", was released later that week on 26 July.

On 24 August, the band released the album's third single, and last before the album's release, "Overflow".

On 27 January 2024, "Nightmare", the album's second single, placed at 90th in the Triple J Hottest 100, 2023.

On 10 May 2024, the band announced the album's fourth single, "Dissipate", which was accompanied by a live music video filmed at Margaret Court Arena on 9 September 2023, during the Australian leg of the Fatalism tour.

== Tour ==
On 31 May 2023, the band announced a tour for September 2023 in support of the album, featuring bands August Burns Red, Kublai Khan and Currents.

== Track listing ==
Fatalism track listing
No.	Title	Length
1.	"Harbinger"	3:24
2.	"Nightmare"	4:28
3.	"Parasites"	3:16
4.	"Overflow"	4:11
5.	"With Regards"	4:11
6.	"Inhumane"	3:59
7.	"The Crossfire"	4:06
8.	"Dissipate"	4:23
9.	"Aftertouch"	4:19
10.	"Fault Line"	5:05
11.	"All in Vain"	4:43
Total length:		46:11

== Personnel ==
Polaris

- Daniel Furnari – drums
- Jamie Hails – unclean vocals, additional clean vocals
- Rick Schneider – rhythm guitar
- Jake Steinhauser – bass, clean vocals, additional unclean vocals
- Ryan Siew – lead guitar

Additional personnel

- Lance Prenc – engineering, mixing, mastering
- Scottie Simpson – vocal recording

== Charts ==
Chart performance for Fatalism
Chart (2023)	Peak position
Australian Albums (ARIA)	1
German Albums (Offizielle Top 100)	25
Scottish Albums (Official Charts)	77
UK Album Downloads (Official Charts)	13
UK Independent Albums (Official Charts)	17
UK Rock & Metal Albums (Official Charts)	8
