= The Mortal Coil (album) =

2017 studio album by Australian band Polaris

Studio album by Polaris
- Released: 3 November 2017
- Genres: Metalcore; melodic metalcore; progressive metalcore
- Length: 42:12
- Labels: Resist; SharpTone
- Producers: Carson Slovak; Grant McFarland

Polaris chronology
The Mortal Coil (2017)	The Death of Me (2020)

Singles from The Mortal Coil
- 1. "Consume" Released: July 7, 2017; 2. "The Remedy" Released: August 28, 2017; 3. "Lucid" Released: October 30, 2017

Professional ratings
Review scores
Source	Rating
Distorted Sound Magazine	9/10
Wall of Sound	9/10
New Transcendence	9.5/10
Louder Sound	4/5 stars
New Noise Magazine	4.5/5 stars
Metal Noise	5/5

The Mortal Coil is the debut studio album by Australian metalcore band Polaris. It was released on 3 November 2017 under Resist Records and SharpTone Records and has been nominated for an ARIA Award for Best Hard Rock or Heavy Metal Album, and Australian Album of the Year award at the 2018 J Awards.

== Release ==
On July 7, 2017, Polaris released the single "Consume", the first single off the album. Two more singles were released for the album, "The Remedy" on August 28, 2017, and "Lucid" on October 30, 2017.

== Reception ==
Kill Your Stereo said that "Polaris are the next big thing", and applauded the technical aspects of the album, saying "The guitar work moves from these moments of groovy, nu-metal bounces (‘The Remedy'), to these mighty fine melodic touches ('In Somnus Veritas'), to these Periphery-esque tech sections (‘Relapse’)".

== Track listing ==
The Mortal Coil track listing
No.	Title	Length
1.	"Lucid"	3:59
2.	"The Remedy"	4:03
3.	"Relapse"	3:15
4.	"Consume"	4:11
5.	"Frailty"	3:21
6.	"In Somnus Veritas"	2:22
7.	"Dusk to Day"	4:02
8.	"Casualty"	3:43
9.	"The Slow Decay"	4:15
10.	"Crooked Path"	4:41
11.	"Sonder"	4:19
Total length:		42:12

== Charts ==
Chart performance for The Mortal Coil
Chart (2017)	Peak position
Australian Albums (ARIA)	6

== Awards ==
=== ARIA Music Awards ===
The ARIA Music Awards is an annual awards ceremony that recognises excellence, innovation, and achievement across all genres of Australian music.

Year	Nominee / work	Award	Result
2018	The Mortal Coil	Best Hard Rock/Heavy Metal Album	Nominated

=== J Award ===
The J Awards are an annual series of Australian music awards that were established by the Australian Broadcasting Corporation's youth-focused radio station Triple J. They commenced in 2005.

Year	Nominee / work	Award	Result
J Awards of 2018	The Mortal Coil	Australian Album of the Year	Nominated

== Personnel ==
Polaris

- Daniel Furnari – drums
- Jamie Hails – unclean vocals
- Rick Schneider – rhythm guitar
- Jake Steinhauser – bass, clean vocals
- Ryan Siew – lead guitar

Production

- Grant McFarland – mastering, mixing, production, engineering
- Carson Slovak – mastering, mixing, production, engineering
- Ash Hull - management
- Chris Blancado - recording
- Carol Aldrighi - artwork, design
