= Lovesick Sentimental =

Studio album by Pacific Avenue
- Released: 27 February 2026
- Length: 43:15
- Label: BMG
- Producer: Doug Boehm

Pacific Avenue chronology
Flowers (2023)	Lovesick Sentimental (2026)

Singles from Lovesick Sentimental
- 1. "Working Class Hero" Released: 19 September 2025; 2. "Here We Go Again" Released: 14 November 2025; 3. "Things We Wanna Say" Released: 16 January 2026; 4. "Eat Me Alive" Released: 13 February 2026; 5. "Tell Me It Ain’t Over" Released: 27 February 2026

Lovesick Sentimental is the second studio album by the Australian alternative rock band Pacific Avenue. It was surprise released on 27 February 2026, a week earlier than scheduled, due to anticipation. It had initially been announced for release on 6 March in November 2025.

Upon release, drummer Dom Littrich told The Music: "This last album was a bit of a process. We had a few factors that were out of our control. We linked up with producer Doug Bowen from LA, kicking things off after our headline tour over there. But then the fires happened in LA, Harry got a bit sick, and everything was delayed. The silver lining was that it gave us a bit more time to create it all as a body of work rather stand-alone songs and singles. There's an overarching theme, but we all agree as a band that it's got this stadium rock kind of vibe. As in big sounds with lyrics that allow people to sing along in a ballad-type way."

The album will be supported by the Australian Lovesick Sentimental tour in March 2026.

== Reception ==
Rolling Stone Australia said "Lovesick Sentimental captures a band in full bloom and proves why they've become one of Australia's most loved and dynamic acts."

Jacob McCormack from The Music noted "new sonic territories" on the album saying, "It's a marginal departure from the heavy, traditional rock sounds of Flowers, moving towards a sound that captures stadium rock ballads" calling it "as an ode to the sounds the band grew up with in the '90s."

== Track listing ==
All tracks are written by Jack Kay, Benjamin Fryer, Dominic Littrich, and Harry O'Brien, with additional writers noted.

Lovesick Sentimental track listing
No.	Title	Writer(s)	Length
1.	"Things We Wanna Say"	Lachlan Bostock	3:55
2.	"Eat Me Alive"	Taras Hrubyj-Piper	4:00
3.	"Working Class Hero"	Bostock	3:52
4.	"Here We Go Again"	Anna Hamilton; Charlie Hole	4:11
5.	"Off the Record"	Alexander Burnett	3:20
6.	"Love Bites"	Hole	3:21
7.	"Brown Eyes"	Hole	3:07
8.	"Telescope"	Hole; Blake Lauricella	4:24
9.	"Ordinary People"	Elliott Hammond; Alex Markwell	4:31
10.	"Dance with Somebody"	Hole	3:45
11.	"Tell Me It Ain't Over"	Bostock; Redd	4:49
Total length:			43:15

== Personnel ==
Credits adapted from Tidal.

=== Pacific Avenue ===
- Benjamin Fryer – guitar
- Jack Kay – bass
- Dominic Littrich – drums
- Harry O'Brien – vocals, guitar, keyboards

=== Additional contributors ===
- Doug Boehm – production, mixing
- Lachlan Bostock – co-production on "Working Class Hero"
- Blake Lauricella – engineering
- Dave Cooley – mastering

== Charts ==
Chart performance for Lovesick Sentimental
Chart (2026)	Peak position
Australian Albums (ARIA)	17
