= Skeleten =

Australian producer and musician

- Born: Russell Fitzgibbon
- Origin: Sydney, Australia
- Genres: Electronic dance music
- Occupation: musician
- Years active: 2020-present

Skeleten is the solo project of Russell Fitzgibbon, an Australian electronic musician from Sydney, who was first unveiled in 2020.

Fitzgibbon is also one half electronic due Fishing and plays bass for alt-country act Babitha.

In July 2023, Skeleten released the debut album Under Utopia.

In February 2025, Skeleten released the album Mentalized which peaked at number 39 on the Australian ARIA Charts in February 2026. Rolling Stone Australia named it the 32nd best Australian Album of 2025.

In February 2025, Skeleten won the Dance/Electronic Professional Development Awards from APRA.

== Discography ==
=== Studio albums ===
List of studio albums, with selected chart position
Title	Details	Peak chart positions
Title	Details	AUS
Under Utopia	Released: 28 July 2023; Label: Astral People (APR056LP); Format: digital download, LP	(Note: Under Utopia did not enter the ARIA top 100, but peaked at number 12 on the Vinyl Albums Chart.)
Mentalized	Released: 7 February 2025; Label: Astral People, 2MR (APR100LP); Format: digital download, LP	39

== Awards and nominations ==
=== AIR Awards ===
The Australian Independent Record Awards (commonly known informally as AIR Awards) is an annual awards night to recognise, promote and celebrate the success of Australia's Independent Music sector.

Year	Nominee / work	Award	Result	Ref.
2024	Under Utopia	Best Independent Dance or Electronica Album or EP	Nominated	
