= Charlie Collins (musician) =

Australian singer and songwriter

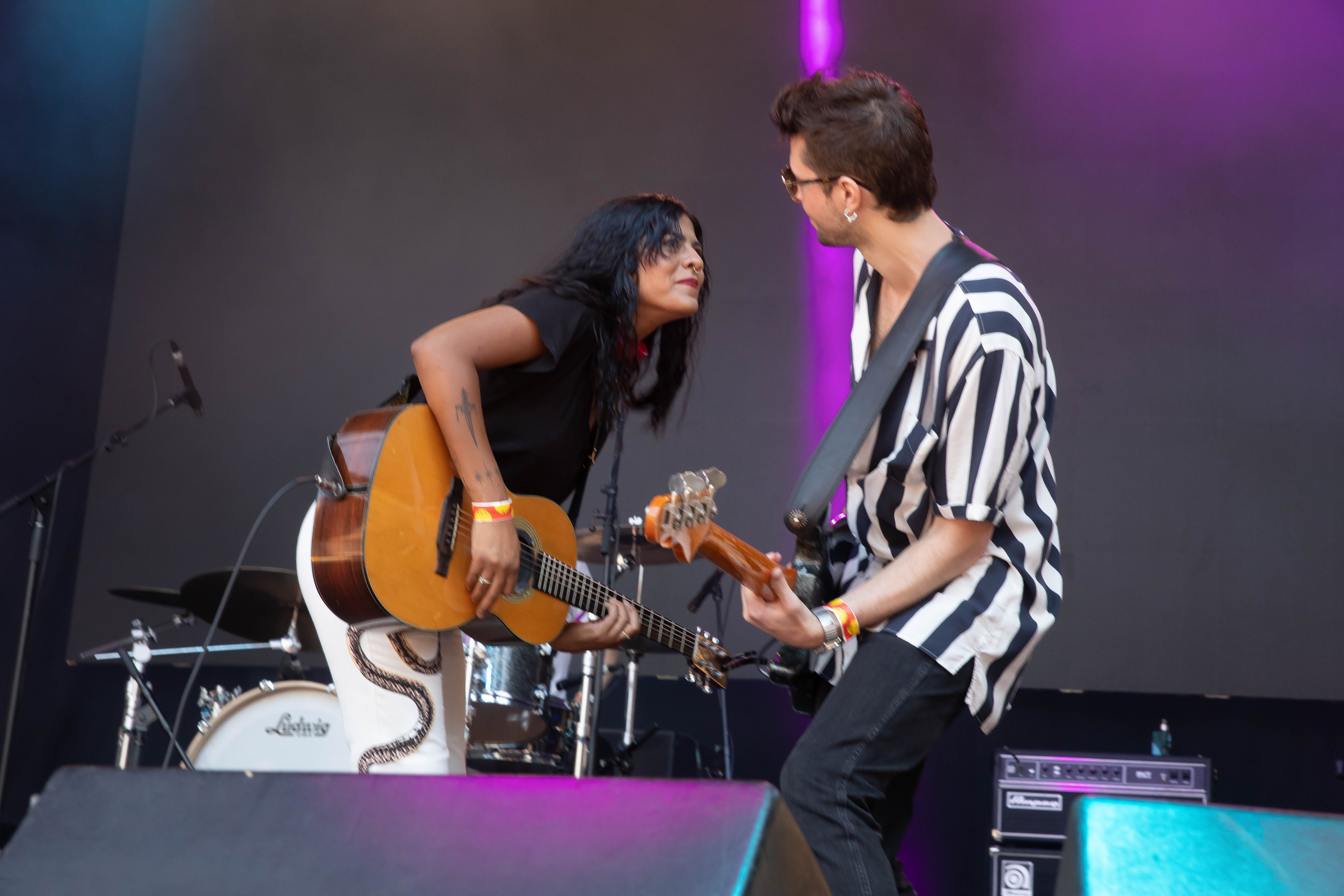

Background information
- Born: Charlene Joyce Bailey; 1987 or 1988 (age 38–39); Sydney, New South Wales, Australia
- Origin: Tamworth, New South Wales, Australia
- Genre: Country
- Occupation: Musician
- Instruments: Vocals, guitar, piano
- Formerly of: The Baileys/Chasing Bailey; Tigertown

Charlie Collins (born Charlene Joyce Bailey; 1987 or 1988) is an Australian singer and songwriter. With her siblings she first played in the bands The Baileys and Chasing Bailey. From 2011 until 2017 she played in Tigertown, with her then husband Chris Collins and two of each of their siblings. For her solo debut album, Snowpine, she was nominated for the 2019 ARIA Award for Best Country Album. Her second studio album, Undone, was released in April 2022.

== Early life and education ==
Charlene Joyce Bailey was born on 1987 or 1988 in Sydney to an Indian family.

She then moved to Tamworth and grew up on a nearby farm with her older siblings, Kurt and Crystal, who are also musicians.

== Career ==
=== 2001: The Baileys ===
The three siblings formed a group, the Baileys, in Tamworth in 2001 with Collins on lead vocals and guitar, Kurt on drums and Crystal on vocals and mandolin. They were later joined by Daniel Conway on lead guitar and vocals and Lindsay Dallas on bass guitar, producing a sound described as "embrac[ing] country, pop, rock and white-eyed soul".

=== 2008-2010: Chasing Bailey ===
By July 2008 the band renamed themselves as Chasing Bailey, described in The Sydney Morning Herald as a "five-piece pop rock band". In August of that year the group released their debut album, Long Story Short, through EMI. Collins described their music, "We don't want to pigeonhole ourselves at this point and it's not because we don't like country or don't like pop".

=== 2011-2017: Tigertown ===
From 2011 to 2017 Collins was a member of the Sydney pop band Tigertown, with her husband, Chris Collins, on lead guitar and his siblings, Elodie on bass guitar and Alexi on keyboards. Collins' siblings Crystal and Kurt were early members. The band released six extended plays, starting with Tigertown in 2011 and ending with Warriors in 2017.

Collins has known the members of Gang of Youths since they were teenagers, and they played as the support act for her first national tour with the band.

=== 2018-present: solo ===
In July 2018, Collins released her debut solo single, "Wish You Were Here". On 31 May 2019, Collins released her debut solo album, Snowpine. The album was recorded at the Snowpine Lodge in Dalgety. Also appearing on the album were Chris Collins (guitar) and George Georgiadis (drums). Her next single was "Mexico", leading to a national tour with Gang of Youths and attracting many fans, including Courtney Barnett and Amy Shark. She also played support for English musician Sam Fender and US-based South African-born country singer Orville Peck.

In November 2019 she released the track "I Don't Want to Be in a Rock Band", which was written while touring with Gang of Youths. Kevin Rutherford wrote in Billboard that it "continues the breezy, country-tinged sound of Snowpine, flecked with harmonica and rootsy electric guitar". The accompanying video, directed by Mickey Mason, features Collins and her band in various locations in Sydney. She was set to follow this with a national tour in early 2020.

In 2021, Collins released "Fuck It", the lead single from her forthcoming album. Her second studio album, Undone, half of which was recorded at The Grove Studios, (Note: This Sydney recording studio, originally built in 2000 by Garry Gary Beers from INXS, has provided recording facilities and expertise for musicians such as Julia Jacklin, Silverchair, Ocean Alley, Courtney Barnett, DZ Deathrays, DMA's and Sarah Blasko.) was released on Island Records in April 2022. Its style was described in The Music as "rhythmic '80s rock, contempo soul balladry, and slick power-pop – rivalling Taylor Swift". She said that the title reflected the theme of the album: "all about letting go and exposing the truths behind the pain". She wrote one song, "November", on piano, on the 1st wedding anniversary after separating from her husband. She did not want to include it on the album, but was encouraged to do so by Gang Of Youths guitarist Joji Malani. She co-wrote some of the songs on the album with Gab Strum (aka "Japanese Wallpaper"), Xavier Dunn, and Jarryd James.

In February–March 2022 Collins travelled to Europe, spending time with her friends in Gang of Youths, whom she has known since they were young, in London. She performed as their support act at the Brixton Academy, (where one reviewer called her vocals "ethereal, country-infused"); the Albert Hall in Manchester; and another venue. A bout of COVID-19 prevented her playing the full tour. Later that year she did a national Undone tour in Australia.

She performed at Splendour in the Grass in July 2022, and as a support act for Conan Gray in November 2022.

== Personal life ==
Collins married Chris Collins, but the marriage ended and they divorced around 2019–2020.

== Discography ==
=== Albums ===
| Title | Details |
|---|---|
| Snowpine | Released: 31 May 2019; Label: Mirror Records (MIRROR001CD); Format: CD, LP, digital |
| Undone | Released: 29 April 2022; Label: Island Records / UMA (3866263); Format: CD, LP, digital |
| Nightwriter | Released: 29 August 2025; Label: Island Records / UMA (7566582); Format: LP, digital |

== Recognition and awards ==
In January 2019 The Music named Collins as an act to watch.

=== AIR Awards ===
The Australian Independent Record Awards (commonly known informally as AIR Awards) is an annual awards night to recognise, promote and celebrate the success of Australia's Independent Music sector.

| Year | Nominee / work | Award | Result | Ref. |
|---|---|---|---|---|
| 2020 | Snowpine | Best Independent Country Album | Won | |

=== ARIA Music Awards ===
The ARIA Music Awards are a set of annual ceremonies presented by Australian Recording Industry Association (ARIA), which recognise excellence, innovation, and achievement across all genres of the music of Australia. They commenced in 1987.

| Year | Nominee / work | Award | Result | Ref. |
|---|---|---|---|---|
| 2019 | Snowpine | Best Country Album | Nominated | |
| 2022 | Undone | Best Blues and Roots Album | Nominated | |
