= Old Mervs (album) =

Studio album by Old Mervs
- Released: 21 March 2025
- Length: 35:52
- Label: Dew Process
- Producer: Chris Collins

Old Mervs chronology
Give It Up (2023)	Old Mervs (2025)	Carparks (2026)

Singles from Old Mervs
- 1. "What You've Lost" Released: 19 June 2024; 2. "Forget It" Released: 4 September 2024; 3. "Parched" Released: 13 November 2024; 4. "See You Again" Released: December 2024; 5. "Everyone Will See It" Released: February 2025

Old Mervs is the debut studio album by Australian independent rock duo Old Mervs. It was announced in November 2024 and released on 21 March 2025. The album debuted at number 4 on the ARIA Charts.

== Critical reception ==
Professional ratings
Review scores
Source	Rating
The AU Review	4.5/5 stars
Rolling Stone Australia	3/5 stars

Dakota Griffiths from The Note said "Across 11 tracks, Old Mervs surge between sun-soaked Australian indie, Brit-pop and '90s West Coast alt-rock. But the consistent thread throughout the expansive collection of songs is the two-piece's commitment to producing sound that feels authentic to them."

Sarah Duggan from The AU Review said "Old Mervs have truly proven themselves with this release, crafting an album that feels authentic, exciting and effortlessly enjoyable. Old Mervs are just getting started, and if this debut is anything to go by, the future is incredibly bright."

James Jennings from Rolling Stone Australia called the album "serviceable, if unremarkable, indie-rock aimed at the triple j crowd."

== Track listing ==
All songs written by Dave House and Henry Carrington-Jones; "Parched" and "Everyone Will See It" co-written with Chris Collins.

1. "Parched" – 3:55
2. "See You Again" – 2:31
3. "What You've Lost" – 2:50
4. "Best I Know" – 3:15
5. "Forget It" – 2:45
6. "Waiting" – 4:09
7. "Don’t Go" – 2:41
8. "Everyone Will See It" – 3:24
9. "Feel It" – 2:54
10. "Focus" – 3:58
11. "Steady" – 3:21

== Personnel ==
Credits adapted from Tidal and the album's liner notes.

=== Old Mervs ===
- David House – vocals, guitar
- Henry Carrington-Jones – drums

=== Additional contributors ===
- Chris Collins – production, recording, mixing
- George Georgiadis – mastering
- Shaun Kennedy – art, vinyl
- Andrew Briggs – photography
- Luke Moore – photography

== Charts ==
Weekly chart performance for Old Mervs
Chart (2025)	Peak position
Australian Albums (ARIA)	4

Year-end chart performance for Old Mervs
Chart (2025)	Position
Australian Artist Albums (ARIA)	28
