= AIR Awards of 2024 =

Edition of annual Australian music award

2024 AIR Awards
- Date: 1 August 2024
- Venue: Queen's Theatre, Adelaide, Australia

Highlights
- Most wins: Genesis Owusu and Cub Sport (2)
- Most nominations: Genesis Owusu (5)
- Website: https://air.org.au/air-awards/

The 2024 AIR Awards is the eighteenth annual Australian Independent Record Labels Association Music Awards ceremony (generally known as the AIR Awards), which took place on 1 August 2024 in Adelaide. The 2024 AIR Awards introduced two new categories; the Independent Producer of the Year and the Independent Music Video of the Year. The nominees were revealed on 14 May 2024.

== Performances ==
- Maple Glider
- Jack River
- Bumpy
- Slava Grigoryan
- RVG

== Nominees and winners ==
Winners indicated in boldface, with other nominees in plain.

Independent Album of the Year	Independent Song of the Year
**RVG – Brain Worms**; Cub Sport – Jesus at the Gay Bar; Genesis Owusu – Struggler; Jen Cloher – I Am the River, the River Is Me; Maple Glider – I Get Into Trouble	**Jem Cassar-Daley – "King of Disappointment"**; Genesis Owusu – "Leaving the Light"; Maple Glider – "Don't Kiss Me"; RVG – "Nothing Really Changes"; Teen Jesus and the Jean Teasers – "I Used to Be Fun"
Breakthrough Independent Artist of the Year	Best Independent Blues and Roots Album or EP
**Royel Otis**; Big Wett; Chloe Dadd; Enola; Pacific Avenue	**Dan Sultan – Dan Sultan**; Dope Lemon – Kimosabé; Georgia Mooney – Full of Moon; Leah Senior – The Music That I Make; The Teskey Brothers – The Winding Way
Best Independent Children's Album or EP	Best Independent Classical Album or EP
**Josh Pyke – It's Gonna Be a Great, Great Day!**; Amber Lawrence – A Very Aussie Aussie Christmas; Emma Memma – Ballet Time; The Wiggles – Ready Steady Wiggle; Whistle & Trick – Bananas and Other Delicious Things	**Australian Chamber Orchestra + Richard Tognetti – Beethoven Symphonies 1, 2 & 3 'Eroica'**; Karen Jacobsen – Misogyny Opus; Neil Gaiman and Fourpay String Quartet – Signs of Life; Russell Morris – The Real Thing: Symphonic Concert; Slava Grigoryan – Gratitudes
Best Independent Country Album or EP	Best Independent Dance or Electronica Album or EP
**Fanny Lumsden – Hey Dawn**; Henry Wagons – South of Everywhere; Maple Glider – I Get Into Trouble; The Wolfe Brothers – Livin' the Dream; Travis Collins – Any Less Anymore	**Cub Sport – Jesus at the Gay Bar**; Big Wett – Pu$$y; Haiku Hands – Pleasure Beast; Simona Castricum – Sink; Skeleten – Under Utopia
Best Independent Dance, Electronica or Club Single	Best Independent Heavy Album or EP
**Fisher and Kita Alexander – "Atmosphere"**; Confidence Man – "On & On (Again)"; Memphis LK – "Black and Blue"; Odd Mob and Omnom – "Losing Control"; The Jungle Giants – "Trippin Up"	**Polaris – Fatalism**; C.O.F.F.I.N – Australia Stops; Glitoris – Glitoris; RedHook – Postcard from a Living Hell; Void of Vision – Chronicles
Best Independent Hip Hop Album or EP	Best Independent Jazz Album or EP
**Genesis Owusu – Struggler**; JK-47 – Revision for Regrowth; Teether and Kuya Neil – Stressor; Urthboy – Savour; Ziggy Ramo – Sugar Coated Lies	**Elixir – A Small Shy Truth**; Grievous Bodily Calm – Cascades; Lance Gurisik and Jeremy Rose – Cull Portal; Mike Nock – Hearing; The Rookies – Feed the Fire
Best Independent Pop Album or EP	Best Independent Punk Album or EP
**Jack River – Endless Summer**; Hatchie – Giving the World Away (Deluxe); Kate Ceberano – My Life Is a Symphony; Molly Millington – 5 Stages; Nat Vazer – Strange Adrenaline	**Private Function – 370HSSV 0773H**; ENOLA – All Is Forgiven EP; Luca Brasi – The World Don't Owe You Anything; Radio Free Alice – Radio Free Alice; Teenage Joans – The Rot That Grows Inside My Chest
Best Independent Rock Album or EP	Best Independent Soul/R&B Album or EP
**Teen Jesus and the Jean Teasers – I Love You**; Alex Lahey – The Answer Is Always Yes; Pacific Avenue – Flowers; Royel Otis – Sofa Kings; RVG – Brain Worms	**WILSN – Those Days Are Over**; Bumpy – Morning Sun; Immy Owusu – Lo Life; Ruby Jackson – Sweeter for Me; Women of Soul Collective – Feel Good
Independent Marketing Team of the Year	Independent Publicity Team of the Year
**The Annex/Ourness/AWAL – Genesis Owusu - Struggler**; Domestic La La – Teen Jesus And The Jean Teasers - I Love You; I OH YOU/Mushroom Group – DMA's - How Many Dreams?; Ivy League Records/Mushroom – The Teskey Brothers - The Winding Way; Slow Clap – Private Function - 370HSSV 0773H	**Jessia Searle – Jen Cloher - I Am The River, The River Is Me**; I OH YOU/Mushroom – DMA's - How Many Dreams?; Janine Morcos – Teenage Joans - The Rot That Grows Inside My Chest; Thinking Loud – Genesis Owusu - Struggler; This Much Talent – Nat Vazer - Strange Adrenaline
Independent Producer of the Year	Independent Music Video of the Year
**Bonnie Knight – Enola - All Is Forgiven (EP)**; Konstantin Kersting – DMA's - How Many Dreams?; Oscar Dawson – Teen Jesus And The Jean Teasers - I Love You; Pnau – multiple singles in 2023; Tom Iansek – Maple Glider - I Get Into Trouble	**Adam Munnings – Cub Sport – "Keep Me Safe"**; Chris Cowburn – Emma Donovan – "Blak Nation"; Hayden Somerville – RVG – "Nothing Really Changes"; Sean Higgins – Adam Noviello – "Fumbling"; Tobias Willis – Georgia Mooney – "War Romance"
Best Independent Label	Outstanding Achievement Award
**Ourness**; ABC Music; Dot Dash Recordings; Poinson City Records; Spinning Top Records	**Don Spencer**

== See also ==
- Music of Australia
