= Grentperez =

Filipino-Australian singer (born 2001)

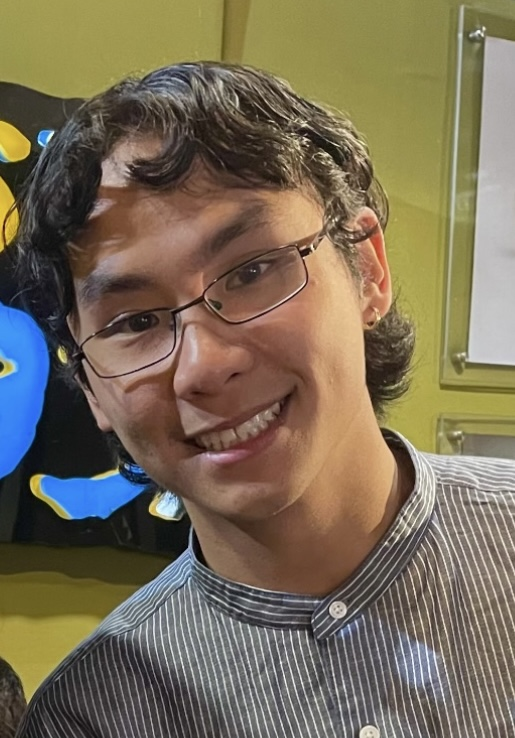
- Grentperez in 2025

Background information
- Born: Grant Perez; 4 December 2001 (age 24); Sydney, Australia
- Label: Fast Friends
- Website: grentperez.com

Grant Perez (born 4 December 2001), known professionally as Grentperez, is a Filipino-Australian singer and songwriter. He is widely known for his 2021 single, "Cherry Wine". Perez records on the Fast Friends record label.

At the APRA Music Awards of 2024, Grentperez won the APRA for Emerging Songwriter of the Year.

== Early life and education ==
Grant Perez grew up as the youngest of three children in Sydney, Australia and is of Filipino descent. He listened to the Eagles, the Beatles, and Queen with his dad before moving on to the likes of Musiq Soulchild.

He started his senior education at St Clair High School before completing his HSC at St Marys Senior High School. Perez found his audience on YouTube playing guitar and singing covers and original songs from age five. At the end of 2013, he launched his YouTube channel. In 2020, Perez uploaded original tracks "Wait for You", "Dreams" and "In My Heart", which all featured on his 2021 EP Demo(s) About Love.

Grant originally changed his instagram handle to “grentperez” as a joke with his friend. He simply changed “a” in ‘Grant’ with an “e.” It just so happened that Instagram implemented a policy where users were unable and had to wait thirty days to change their username again. During that time, he grew to end up liking the look of his name with the “e” and decided to keep it.

== Career ==
On 10 September 2021, Perez released his debut single "Cherry Wine". It was certified gold by the Australian Recording Industry Association (ARIA).

In 2022, Perez released the EPs Conversations with the Moon and Trail Mix Tape, as well as a Christmas single called "When Christmas Comes Again".

In June 2023, Perez released his fourth EP, When We Were Younger. When We Were Younger is a seven-track song cycle centered around the concept of nostalgia.

In September 2023, Perez released "Op Shop Lover" with Lime Cordiale.

In November 2023, Grentperez released the Christmas single "Christmas Starts Tonight".

In July 2024, Perez released "Room For You" with Lyn Lapid. Perez recorded a cover of "But Not for Me" for the 2025 tribute album Chet Baker Re:imagined.

In January 2025, Perez announced his debut studio album Backflips in a Restaurant which was released on 28 March, 2025.

On 14 August 2026, Perez released the EP g00se.

== Discography ==
=== Studio albums ===
List of studio albums, with selected details
Title	Details	Peak chart positions
Title	Details	AUS
Backflips in a Restaurant	Released: 28 March 2025; Label: Fast Friends, AWAL (FF0085CD); Formats: CD, LP, digital	3

=== Live albums ===
List of live albums, with selected details
Title	Details
Backflips in a Restaurant (Live in Sydney)	Released: 27 March 2026; Label: Fast Friends, AWAL; Formats: digital

=== Extended plays ===
List of EPs, with selected details
Title	Details
Demo(s) About Love	Released: 27 August 2021; Label: Fast Friends; Formats: Digital download, streaming, LP
Conversations with the Moon	Released: 14 February 2022; Label: Fast Friends; Formats: digital download, streaming, LP
Trail Mix Tape EP	Released: 30 September 2022; Label: Fast Friends, AWAL; Formats: digital download, streaming,
When We Were Younger (with Cavetown)	Released: 2 June 2023; Label: Fast Friends (FF0032), AWAL (GPLP01CD); Formats: digital download, streaming, CD, LP
g00se	Released: 14 August 2026; Label: Fast Friends, AWAL; Formats: digital download, streaming, CD, LP

=== Charted and certified songs ===
List of charted or certified singles
Title	Year	Peak chart positions	Certification	Album
Title	Year	NZ Hot	Certification	Album
"Cherry Wine"	2021	—	ARIA: Platinum; RIAA: Gold	Conversations with the Moon
"Room for You" (with Lyn Lapid)	2024	29		Non-album single
"Dandelion" (with Ruel)	2025	38		Backflips in a Restaurant
"Movie Scene"	2025	29		Backflips in a Restaurant
"Folding Chairs on the Moon" (with Honne)	2025	39		Non-album single

== Awards and nominations ==
=== APRA Awards ===
The APRA Awards are held in Australia and New Zealand by the Australasian Performing Right Association to recognise songwriting skills, sales and airplay performance by its members annually.

Year	Nominee / work	Award	Result	Ref.
2024	Grentperez	Emerging Songwriter of the Year	Won	

=== ARIA Awards ===
The ARIA Music Awards is an annual award ceremony event celebrating the Australian music industry.

Year	Nominee / work	Award	Result	Ref.
2023	When We Were Younger	Michael Gudinski Breakthrough Artist	Nominated	

=== J Awards ===
The J Awards are an annual series of Australian music awards that were established by the Australian Broadcasting Corporation's youth-focused radio station Triple J. They commenced in 2005.

Year	Nominee / work	Award	Result	Ref.
2022	Himself	Unearthed Artist of the Year	Nominated	
2025	Backflips in a Restaurant	Australian Album of the Year	Nominated	

=== Rolling Stone Australia Awards ===
The Rolling Stone Australia Awards are awarded annually by the Australian edition of Rolling Stone magazine for outstanding contributions to popular culture in the previous year.

Year	Nominee / work	Award	Result	Ref.
2024	Himself	Best New Artist	Nominated	
