= SoSo =

Australian pop punk band

- Origin: Illawarra, New South Wales
- Genre: Pop punk music
- Years active: 2020–present
- Label: Independent
- Members: Rhys de Burgh; Tom Doy; Cody Stebbings
- Website: sosopunx.com

SoSo are an independent Australian Pop punk music / Alternative band from Illawarra, New South Wales. They are self-described as "offensively average".

In November 2025, they released their debut album So Much for Second Chances which debuted at number 1 on the Australian Albums ARIA Chart, number 2 on the Vinyl ARIA Chart and number 4 on the main ARIA Chart.

Rolling Stone (Aus) listed So Much For Second Chances as one of the 50 Best Australian Albums of 2025.

SoSo have been widely lauded for their chart topping ability as an independent band, with outlets highlighting the historic achievement was made with no mainstream media support or support from Triple J.

== Career ==
=== 2020-2024: Career beginnings and early EPs ===
In March 2020, SoSo released their debut single "The Henry Lawson Jive".

In July 2021, the group release their debut EP I Wouldn't Call It Success... But It's Close Enough which included their first four singles.

In November 2023, the group release their second EP Failing On Our Own Terms.

=== 2025: So Much for Second Chances ===
In October 2025, the group announced the release of debut studio album So Much for Second Chances. The album was produced by Stevie Knight, released on 21 November 2025 and debuted at number 1 on the Australian Albums ARIA Chart, number 2 on the Vinyl ARIA Chart and number 4 on the main ARIA Charts.

== Band Members ==
Current

- Rhys de Burgh - Vocals
- Tom Doy - Drums
- Cody Stebbings - Guitars

Former

- Christian Doyle* - Guitars
- Tahlia McLennan - Bass Guitar
- Harrison Zatschler - Guitars

*Still active as song-writing member.

== Discography ==
=== Studio albums ===
List of studio albums, with selected details and peak chart positions
Title	Details	Peak chart positions
Title	Details	AUS
So Much for Second Chances	Released: 21 November 2025; Format: CD, LP, digital download, Label: SoSo (SOSO-001-CD)	4

=== Extended plays ===
List of EPs, with selected details and peak chart positions
Title	Details	Peak chart positions
Title	Details	AUS
I Wouldn't Call It Success... But It's Close Enough	Released: 30 July 2021; Format: Streaming, Digital, CD (limited); Label: SoSo	—
Failing On Our Own Terms	Released: 16 November 2023; Format: Streaming, Digital, CD (limited); Label: SoSo	—
Live and Uncensored	Released: 2024; Format: CD (limited); Label: SoSo; Recorded: February 2024	—
Japanese Bonus Tracks	Released: 6 November 2024; Format: Streaming; Label: SoSo	—
