= Pratts & Pain =

Studio album by Royel Otis
- Released: 16 February 2024
- Studios: Mr Dans, South London
- Genre: Indie rock
- Length: 37:30
- Label: Ourness
- Producer: Dan Carey

Royel Otis chronology
Sofa Kings (2023)	Pratts & Pain (2024)	Hickey (2025)

Singles from Pratts & Pain
- 1. "Adored" Released: 18 July 2023; 2. "Fried Rice" Released: 7 October 2023; 3. "Heading for the Door" Released: 7 December 2023; 4. "Velvet" Released: 12 January 2024; 5. "Foam" Released: 16 February 2024

Singles from Pratts & Pain (Extended)
- 1. "Claw Foot" Released: 7 May 2024; 2. "Merry Mary Marry Me" Released: June 2024

Singles from Pratts & Pain (Deluxe)
- 1. "If Our Love Is Dead" Released: 4 October 2024

Pratts & Pain is the debut studio album by Australian guitar-pop duo Royel Otis. It was released on 16 February 2024 via Ourness, and debuted at number 10 on the ARIA Albums Chart. The album's release was supported by five singles, starting with "Adored" and "Fried Rice", as well as tour dates around Australia, North America and Europe. It received positive acclaim from critics. An extended edition, with two bonus tracks, was released digitally in May 2024. A 17-track deluxe edition, titled It Ain't Over Til It Ends Edition was released on 4 October 2024.

At the 2024 ARIA Music Awards, the album was nominated for Album of the Year, Best Independent Release, and won Best Rock Album, Best Produced Release (with Chris Collins), Best Engineered Release (with Collins) and for the duo, Best Group.

At the 2024 J Awards, the album was nominated for Australian Album of the Year.

At the AIR Awards of 2025, the album was nominated for Independent Album of the Year and Best Independent Rock Album or EP while Ourness and The Annex won Independent Marketing Team of the Year and Thinking Loud won Independent Publicity Team of the Year.

== Composition ==
The album's title is derived from Pratts & Payne, a pub in London that the duo would visit during recording sessions at producer Dan Carey's studio, Mr Dans. In an interview with Junkee, lead guitarist Royel Maddell said the songs were not written in the environment which they were recorded, which lead to the album sounding darker: "If you record something in Byron [Bay], it sounds beachy and stuff like that. And then recording in South London with Dan, it definitely sounds a bit more dreary and grey”.

== Critical reception ==
Professional ratings
Review scores
Source	Rating
The Australian	3.5/5 stars
Clash	8/10
Far Out	2.5/5 stars
NME	4/5 stars
Rolling Stone Australia	3.5/5 stars

Following the album's release, NME called Royel Otis "Australia’s next breakout indie heroes". Reviewing for the magazine, Andy Brown said Pratts & Pain was a "sublime debut" with "a sense of adventure", calling it "destined for festival season greatness – for cool-breeze drives, warm summer parties, and late-night singalongs". Joshua Khan of Clash said the album was a sonic leap forward for the band, containing a "remarkably diverse" sound that sets them apart from other indie rock bands. Writing for Far Out, Aimee Ferrier was less positive, calling it a lacklustre release with forgettable tracks, making for "an inevitable addition to a landmine of average indie pop records".

== Track listing ==
Standard physical version
No.	Title	Length
1.	"Adored"	2:40
2.	"Fried Rice"	3:27
3.	"Foam"	3:05
4.	"Sonic Blue"	3:17
5.	"Heading for the Door"	3:47
6.	"Velvet"	2:11
7.	"IHYSM"	3:10
8.	"Molly"	4:00
9.	"Daisy Chain"	3:01
10.	"Glory to Glory"	3:06
11.	"Always Always"	3:00
12.	"Big Ciggie"	2:40
Total length:		37:30

Notes

- Digital and streaming versions include "Sofa King" from their 2023 EP Sofa Kings in the standard track listing.

Extended version
No.	Title	Length
10.	"Sofa King"	3:16
14.	"Claw Foot"	2:46
15.	"Merry Mary Marry Me"	3:08
Total length:		46:41

It Ain't Over Til It Ends Edition (Deluxe)
No.	Title	Length
1.	"Adored"	2:40
2.	"Fried Rice"	3:27
3.	"Foam"	3:05
4.	"Sonic Blue"	3:17
5.	"Claw Foot"	2:46
6.	"Heading for the Door"	3:47
7.	"Merry Mary Marry Me"	3:08
8.	"Velvet"	2:11
9.	"If Our Love Is Dead"	2:53
10.	"IHYSM"	3:10
11.	"Molly"	4:00
12.	"Daisy Chain"	3:01
13.	"Sofa King"	3:16
14.	"Glory to Glory"	3:06
15.	"Til the Morning"	3:32
16.	"Always Always"	3:00
17.	"Big Ciggie"	2:40
Total length:		53:07

== Personnel ==
Royel Otis

- Royel Maddell – lead guitar, bass guitar, synths
- Otis Pavlovic – vocals, guitar, piano

Additional personnel

- Yuri Shibuichi – drums
- Archie Carey – drums
- Rob Brinkmann – writing ("Fried Rice")
- James Ford – writing ("Molly")
- Chris Collins – writing ("Foam", "Daisy Chain"), producer ("Daisy Chain"), additional engineering
- Dan Carey – producer, mixing (all tracks); writing ("Heading for the Door", "Glory to Glory")
- Alexis Smith – mixing ("Daisy Chain"), engineer ("Foam")
- Alan Moulder – mixing ("Foam")
- Ed Quinn – additional production; writing ("IHYSM")
- Adele Phillips – additional engineering
- Christian Wright – mastering
- Adriane Neshoda – graphic design
- Kiran Best – graphic design
- Georges Antoni – cover photograph

== Charts ==
=== Weekly charts ===
Weekly chart performance for Pratts & Pain
Chart (2024)	Peak position
Australian Albums (ARIA)	10
UK Independent Albums Charts (OCC)	21

=== Year-end charts ===
Year-end chart performance for Pratts & Pain
Chart (2024)	Position
Australian Artist Albums (ARIA)	27
Chart (2025)	Position
Australian Artist Albums (ARIA)	35
