= The Vanns =

Australian alternative rock group

- Origin: Kiama, New South Wales, Australia
- Genre: Indie rock
- Years active: 2012–present
- Labels: Sony; Upper River
- Members: Jimmy Vann; Cameron Little; Tom Switlek; Andrew Banovich
- Past members: Adam Bernich; Lachlan Jones; Robert Korber
- Website: www.thevannsband.com

The Vanns are an Australian indie rock band formed in 2012. They released their debut album in 2019.

== History ==
=== 2012–2018: Formation and EPs ===
The Vanns began as a jamming group in 2012 and went onto win the 2012 Red Bull Bedroom Jam, which gave them a placement with The Getaway Plan at the Sydney Hi-Fi, recording time in Melbourne with Jan Skubiszewski and a set at Homebake 2012.

They won Wollongong band competition in 2013. They released their self-titled debut EP in 2013. It was re-released in 2014 as EP 2.0.

In January 2015, The Vanns released their second EP, Scattered by Sundown. This was supported by a national tour. Alexander Crowden from Beat Magazine called the EP "some mighty fine infectious pop-rock" saying "They sound unlike pretty much any other band on the local landscape, and that's a good thing; we need more bands like these guys."

In March 2017, The Vanns released their third EP Shake the Hand That Picks the Fight. Jimmy Vann said, "The EP name is about disguising and turning turning a blind eye from the truth. Trying to shut out what you can't face with temporary reliefs, which we've all done at times - living in a constant high to escape from what's real. It's the idea that it's easy to throw yourself in the deep end but it's much harder to get out."

=== 2019–2022: Through the Walls ===
In October 2019, The Vanns released their debut album, Through the Walls via Sony Music Australia. The album was preceded by the lead single "Mother".

=== 2023–present: Last of Your Kind and All That's in My Head ===
In March 2023, The Vanns announced the release of their second studio album, Last of Your Kind. The album was released on 19 May 2023 and debuted at number 8 on the ARIA Charts.

In June 2025, the group announced the release of their third studio album All That's in My Head.

== Members ==
=== Current ===
- Jimmy Vann – lead vocals, rhythm guitar (2012–present), lead guitar (2012–2016)
- Tom Switlek – bass (2015–present)
- Cameron Little – lead guitar, keyboards, backing vocals (2016–present)
- Andrew Banovich – drums (2019–present)

=== Previous ===
- Robert Korber – keyboards, backing vocals (2012–2014)
- Adam Bernich – bass (2012–2015)
- Lachlan Jones – drums (2012–2019)

== Discography ==
=== Albums ===
List of studio albums, with selected details
Title	Album details	Peak chart positions
Title	Album details	AUS
Through the Walls	Released: October 2019; Format: CD, LP, digital; Label: Sony Music Australia (19075992992)	—
Last of Your Kind	Released: 19 May 2023; Format: CD, 2×LP, digital; Label: Upper River Records (URR230)	8
All That's in My Head	Released: 1 August 2025; Format: CD, LP, digital; Label: Upper River (URR300)	27

=== Extended plays ===
List of EPs, with selected details
Title	EP details
The Vanns	Released: June 2013; Format: CD, digital; Label: The Vanns
Scattered by Sundown	Released: January 2015; Format: CD, digital; Label: The Vanns (VANNSCD01)
Shake the Hand That Picks the Fight	Released: March 2017; Format: CD, LP, digital; Label: The Vanns, Inertia (IMPAK002)
