= Sofa Kings =

EP by Royel Otis
- Released: 31 March 2023
- Genre: Alternative pop, synth-pop
- Label: Ourness / House Anxiety

Royel Otis chronology
Bar & Grill (2022)	Sofa Kings (2023)	Pratts & Pain (2024)

Singles from Sofa Kings
- 1. "Kool Aid" Released: 13 October 2022; 2. "I Wanna Dance with You" Released: 12 January 2023; 3. "Sofa Kings" Released: 3 March 2023; 4. "Going Kokomo" Released: 31 March 2023

Sofa Kings is the third extended play by Australian guitar-pop duo Royel Otis. It was announced in January 2023 alongside its second single, and released on 31 March 2023. Following its physical release in July 2023, the EP peaked at number 43 on the ARIA Albums Chart.

At the 2023 ARIA Music Awards, the EP earned the duo a nomination for Breakthrough Artist.

At the AIR Awards of 2024, the album was nominated for Best Independent Rock Album or EP.

== Critical reception ==
Professional ratings
Review scores
Source	Rating
NME	3/5 stars

Sophie Williams from NME said "Sofa Kings could only be made by a band who have spent years listening to vibrant 2010s indie acts like the Drums and Grouplove, alongside baggier forebears like the Charlatans. Drawing from this pool of influences means that Royel Otis know how to craft undeniable hooks, familiar enough to satisfy passive listening while simultaneously hinting at a more curious and expansive sound to come."

Terron Moore from MTV said "On the band's excellent third EP, Royel Otis sing about the things that come with that guttural yearning for love, and what that might feel like at different degrees, from careless freedom to self-flagellating obsession."

== Track listing ==
1. "Kool Aid" - 3:36
2. "Sofa King" - 3:16
3. "I Wanna Dance with You" - 2:54
4. "Letter from Roy" 2:04
5. "Going Kokomo" - 3:10
6. "Razor Teeth" - 2:59
7. "Farewell Warning" - 2:43

== Charts ==
Weekly chart performance for Sofa Kings
Chart (2023)	Peak position
Australian Albums (ARIA)	43
