= Fangz =

Australian alternative rock group

- Origin: Sydney, New South Wales, Australia
- Genre: Punk rock
- Years active: 2019–2026
- Label: Impressed Recordings
- Website: www.fangz.band

Fangz were an Australian punk rock band formed in 2019. Their main genre of interest is punk rock.

In May 2025, they announced they'd signed with Impressed Recordings and released their debut studio album Shui in July 2025. The album debuted at number 8 on the ARIA Charts. The album reaches #1 on the ARIA Australian Album Charts upon its debut in July.

In October 2026, the band announced their "indefinite hiatus" after the farewell shows in December.

== Members ==
- Josh Cottreau
- Sam Sheumack
- Steve "Woodie" Woodward
- Jameel Majam
- Ethan Holland

== Discography ==
=== Albums ===
List of studio albums, with selected details
Title	Album details	Peak chart positions
Title	Album details	AUS
Shui	Released: 4 July 2025; Format: LP, digital; Label: Impressed Recordings	8

=== Extended plays ===
List of EPs, with selected details
Title	EP details
For Nothing	Released: July 2019; Format: digital; Label: Fangz
But No Thanks	Released: July 2020; Format: digital; Label: Fangz
Falling Is Pretty Normal	Released: February 2022; Format: digital; Label: Fangz
