= Backflips in a Restaurant =

Studio album by Grentperez
- Released: 28 March 2025
- Genre: R&B; indie folk; pop; soft rock
- Length: 37:10
- Label: Fast Friends; AWAL
- Producer: Benny Sings; Gianluca Buccellati; Sam de Jong; Robby De Sá; Raphael George; Gladius; Linden Jay; Jack Kleinick; Daniel Loumpouridis; MarcLo; Josh Mathew; Seth Mathew; Jorgen Odegard; Khris Riddick; Sam Tsang; Matt Zara

Grentperez chronology
When We Were Younger (2023)	Backflips in a Restaurant (2025)	Peace of Mind (2025)

Singles from Backflips in a Restaurant
- 1. "Fuzzy Feeling" Released: 20 September 2024; 2. "2DK" Released: 8 November 2024; 3. "Dandelion" Released: 17 January 2025; 4. "Movie Scene" Released: 21 February 2025; 5. "Need You Around" Released: 28 March 2025

Singles from Backflips in a Restaurant (Deluxe)
- 1. "Peace of Mind" Released: 20 June 2025

Backflips in a Restaurant is the debut studio album by Filipino-Australian singer and songwriter Grentperez. It was announced alongside its third single in January 2025 and released on 28 March 2025.

Upon announcement Grentperez said "Growing up, I soaked up a lot of music from 70s soft rock, to 2000s R&B, Bossa nova, Indie, rap etc… This music effectively influenced my music making, and since my first release in 2021, I've been itching to explore and experiment with my sound. As a creative, I believe my job is to constantly explore and express myself, and with Backflips in a Restaurant I'm taking the steps to do just that."

A deluxe edition was released on 18 July 2025.

At the 2025 J Awards, the album was nominated for Australian Album of the Year.

== Critical reception ==
Professional ratings
Review scores
Source	Rating
NME	4/5 stars
Rolling Stone Australia	3.5/5 stars

Doug Wallen from NME said "[Perez] delivers a debut album packed with relatable lyrics and catchy hooks" and called "2DK" the "standout single".

Sarah Downs from Rolling Stone Australia said "grentperez delivers a nostalgic yet fresh sound on his debut album, flexing his charm with melodic love songs and infectious hooks that blend upbeat R&B, indie-folk, pop, and soft-rock — all with that signature soulful edge."

== Track listing ==
Backflips in a Restaurant track listing
No.	Title	Writer(s)	Producer(s)	Length
1.	"Nice to Meet You"	Grant Perez; Sam Tsang	Sam Tsang	1:51
2.	"Girl at the Station"	Perez; Raphael Angelo George; Rocco George	Raphael George; Josh Mathew; Seth Mathew; Matt Zara	2:28
3.	"Falling for a Friend"	Perez; Sam de Jong; Micah Premnath	Sam de Jong	2:50
4.	"Fuzzy Feeling" (with Benny Sings)	Perez; Samuel Robert Knowles; Tim van Berkestijn	Benny Sings	2:56
5.	"Headspace"	Perez; Daniel Lumpouridis	Daniel Lumpouridis	2:35
6.	"12065"	Perez; Jennifer Decilveo; Jack Kleinick	Jack Kleinick	3:06
7.	"Everest"	Perez; Zara	Zara	2:42
8.	"Need You Around"	Perez; Linden Jay; Zara	Linden Jay; Zara	2:46
9.	"Reason Why"	Perez; Robby De Sá; Alessandra Lindsay Gazal	Robby De Sá	3:11
10.	"Dandelion" (with Ruel)	Perez; Jorgen Odegard; Ruel Vincent van Dijk	Jorgen Odegard	3:23
11.	"2DK"	Perez; Gianluca Buccellati	Gianluca Buccellati	3:16
12.	"Move Scene"	Perez; Marcus Lomax; Khris Riddick	MarcLo; Khris Riddick	3:00
13.	"Yours to Keep"	Perez; James Wong; Zara	Gladius; Zara	3:05
Total length:				37:10

Backflips in a Restaurant (Deluxe) track listing
No.	Title	Writer(s)	Producer(s)	Length
14.	"Might Not Be"	Perez; Thomas James Schleiter; Danny Silberstein	Tommy English	2:25
15.	"Peace of Mind"	Perez; Zara	Zara	2:36
16.	"Girl at the Station"	Perez; George; George	George; Mathew; Zara	2:25

== Personnel ==
Credits adapted from Tidal.

- Grentperez – lead vocals
- Kieran "Kes" Beardmore – mixing
- Vic Cuccia – mastering
- Ralph Malabed – electric guitar on "Girl at the Station"
- Yasmeen Al-Mazeedi – violin on "Girl at the Station"
- Ichi Tanabe – drums on "Headspace", background vocals on "Need You Around"
- Ruel – lead vocals on "Dandelion"
- Cody Dear – saxophone on "Dandelion"

== Charts ==
Weekly chart performance for Backflips in a Restaurant
Chart (2025)	Peak position
Australian Albums (ARIA)	3

Year-end chart performance for Backflips in a Restaurant
Chart (2025)	Position
Australian Artist Albums (ARIA)	26
