= Old Mervs =

Australian Independent rock group

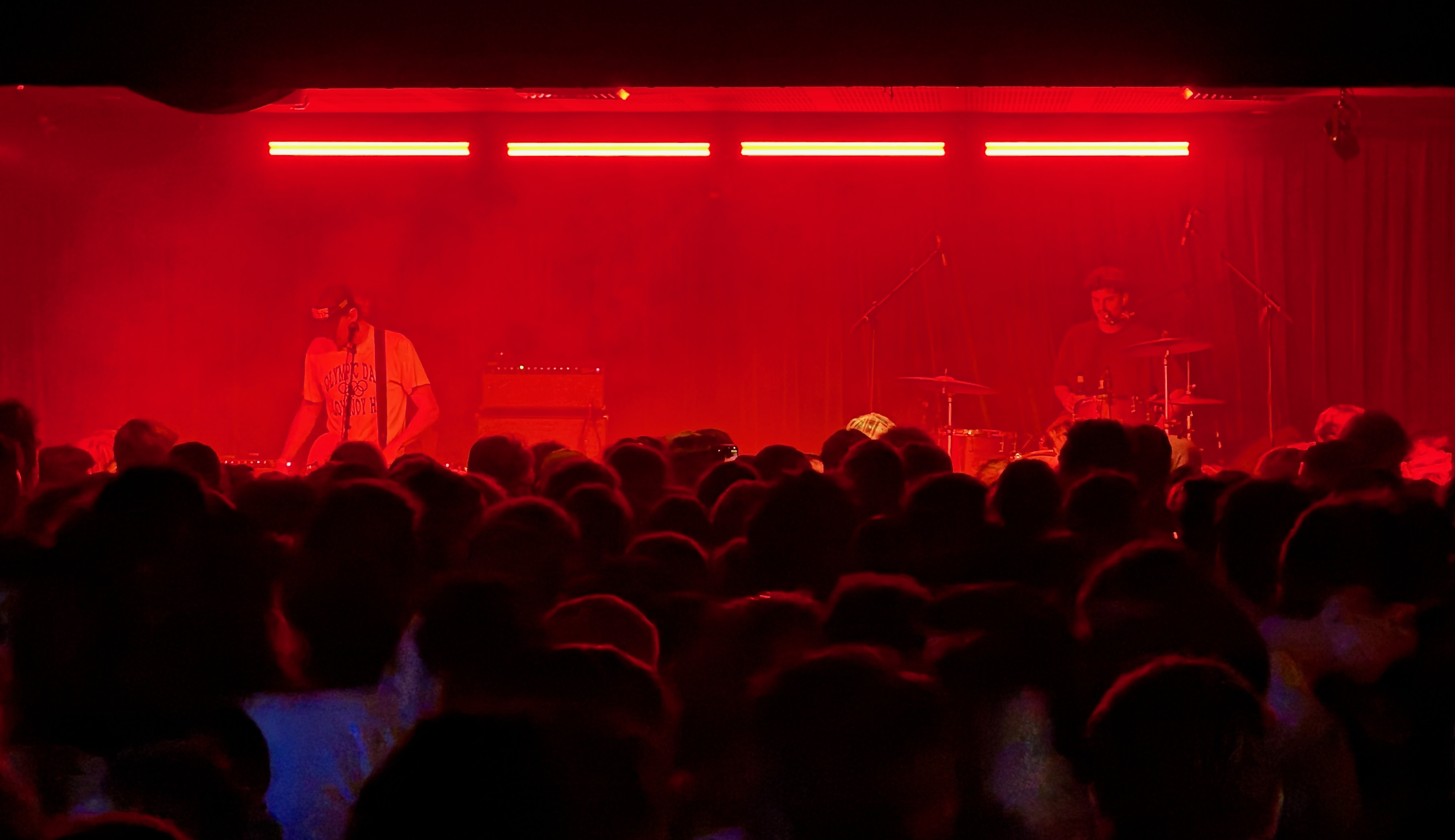
- Old Mervs performing at the Miranda Hotel in March 2026

Background information
- Origin: Kojonup, Western Australia, Australia
- Genre: Independent rock
- Years active: 2017–present
- Label: Dew Process (2022–present)
- Members: David House; Henry Carrington-Jones
- Website: www.oldmervs.com

Old Mervs are an Australian independent rock group, consisting of David House and Henry Carrington-Jones. The duo have known each other since they were five years of age. They started performing together in 2017 and agreed to the name Old Mervs in 2018. Their name refers to the friends' childhood pet dog named Mervin.

Old Mervs have found success with their alternative, Australian indie surf rock, selling out venus across multiple tours both locally in Australia and abroad.

Their second EP Give It Up debuted at number 33 on the ARIA Albums Chart in November 2023.

== Career ==
House and Carrington-Jones have known each other since five years of age, growing up together on rural farms in Kojonup, a small town 256 kilometres south-east of Perth in Western Australia.

On 7 October 2022, Old Mervs released their debut EP Get Better, which was proceeded by the singles "Where I Go" and "Be There".

On 10 November 2023, Old Mervs released their second EP, Give It Up, which became the band's first release to chart on the ARIA Charts.

The single "Sweetheart" placed 47 in triple J's Hottest 100 2023

The single "What You've Lost" placed 38 in triple J's Hottest 100 2024.

In November 2024, Old Mervs announced their self-titled debut album, which was released in March 2025.

Old Mervs performed at Lollapalooza in 2025.

In July 2026, the group announced their second studio album Carparks would be released in October 2026. It was preceded by singles "Heavy in the Morning", "Tether" and "She Said".

== Members ==
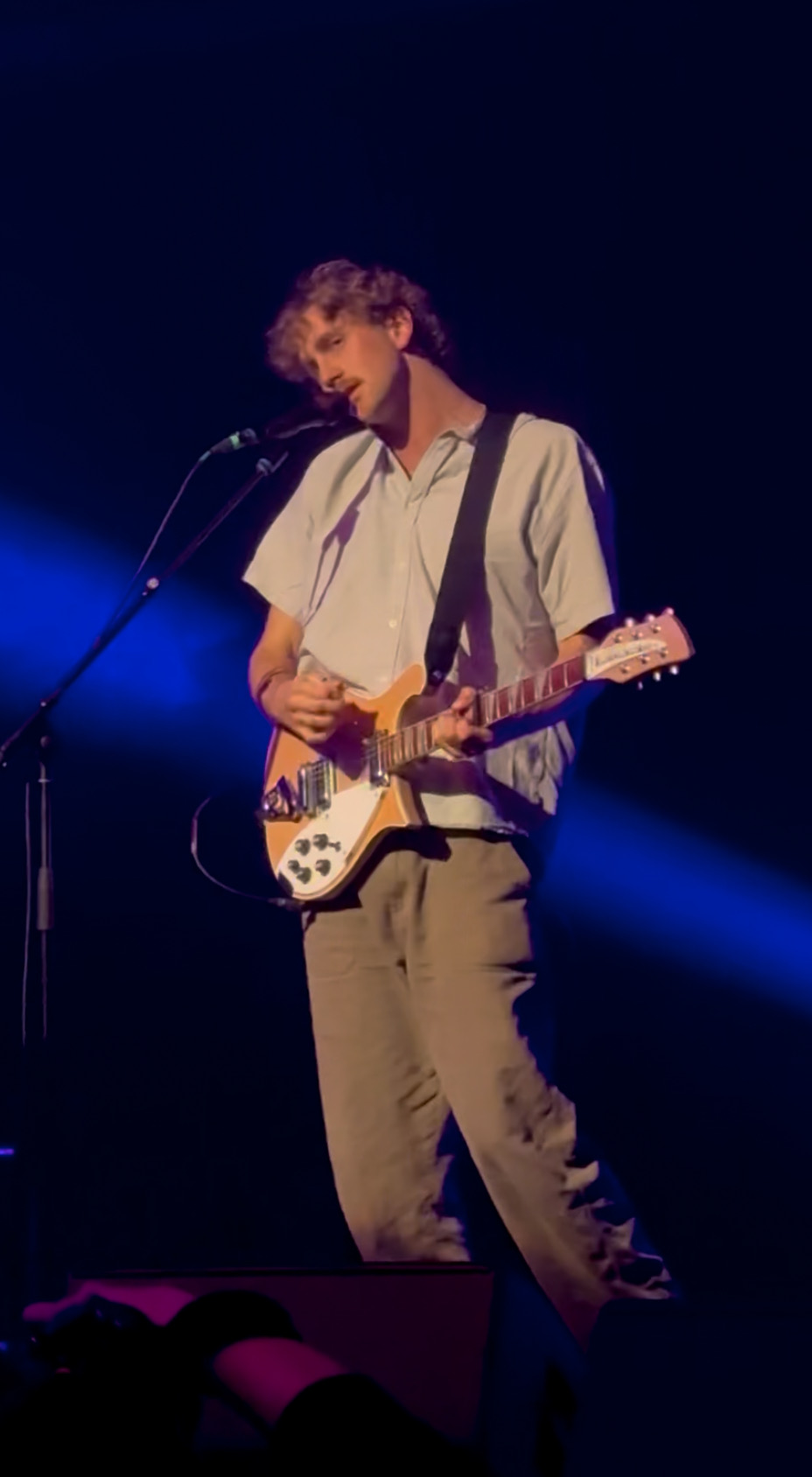
David House performing in May 2025

- David House – guitar, vocals
- Henry Carrington-Jones – drums, backing vocals

== Discography ==
=== Albums ===
List of albums, with selected details
Title	Details	Peak chart positions
Title	Details	AUS
Old Mervs	Released: 21 March 2025; Label: Dew Process (DEW9001558); Format: CD, LP, digital	4
Carparks	Released: 2 October 2026; Label: Dew Process (DEW9001562); Format: CD, LP, digital	16

=== Extended plays ===
List of EPs, with selected details
Title	EP details	Peak chart positions
Title	EP details	AUS
Get Better	Released: 7 October 2022; Label: Dew Process (DEW9001529); Formats: Digital, LP	—
Give It Up	Released: 10 November 2023; Label: Dew Process (DEW9001542); Formats: Digital, LP	33

=== Singles ===
List of singles, showing certifications and album
Title	Year	Certifications	Album
"Cellphone"	2020	ARIA: Gold	Non-album singles
"Out of Luck"	2021	ARIA: Gold	Non-album singles

== Awards and nominations ==
=== APRA Music Awards ===
The APRA Music Awards were established by Australasian Performing Right Association (APRA) in 1982 to honour the achievements of songwriters and music composers, and to recognise their song writing skills, sales and airplay performance, by its members annually.

Year	Nominee / work	Award	Result	Ref.
2026	"Everyone Will See It" by Old Mervs (Henry Carrington-Jones / Chris Collins / David House)	Most Performed Rock Work	Nominated	

=== Rolling Stone Australia Awards ===
The Rolling Stone Australia Awards are awarded annually by the Australian edition of Rolling Stone magazine for outstanding contributions to popular culture in the previous year.

Year	Nominee / work	Award	Result	Ref.
2024	Old Mervs	Best New Artist	Nominated	
