= Hickey (album) =

Studio album by Royel Otis
- Released: 22 August 2025
- Length: 38:25
- Label: Ourness; Capitol
- Producer: Julian Bunetta; Chris Collins; Omer Fedi; J Lloyd; Lydia Kitto; Royel Otis; Blake Slatkin

Royel Otis chronology
Pratts & Pain (2024)	Hickey (2025)

Singles from Hickey
- 1. "Moody" Released: 9 May 2025; 2. "Car" Released: 27 June 2025; 3. "Say Something" Released: 25 July 2025; 4. "Who's Your Boyfriend" Released: 22 August 2025; 5. "I Hate This Tune" Released: 14 November 2025

Hickey is the second studio album by the Australian guitar-pop duo Royel Otis. It was announced in June 2025 and released on 22 August 2025, via Ourness and Capitol Records.

Explaining the album title, Royel Otis said "…because love bites harder than any other emotion in the world."

At the 2025 ARIA Music Awards, the album was nominated for Best Rock Album and Group while Jamieson Kerr's work on "Car" was nominated for Best Video.

== Critical reception ==
Professional ratings
Review scores
Source	Rating
Clash	7/10
The Independent	3/5 stars
The Needle Drop	1/10
NME	4/5 stars

Alex Peters from When the Horn Blows called the album "their most emotionally charged yet" saying "the duo have delivered yet another outstanding body of work, one that captures the sting of love lost without sacrificing musical vibrancy. Hickey isn't just an album about heartbreak. It’s about the strange, beautiful tension of feeling both broken and alive at the same time."

Helen Brown from The Independent said the duo "come off as problematic exes on their second album" saying "You can really relish these songs as outpourings of vulnerability, confusion and anger. They could be perfect to help lovely folk to dance away the pain of messy breakups. But you don’t have to strain too hard to hear them on the incel's playlist either."

Liberty Dunworth from NME said "Throughout the tracklist, guitarist Royel Madden and singer Otis Pavlovic proudly lean into what they do best. Woozy guitar lines are out in full force, accentuated by shimmering synths and intriguing drum patterns, while Pavlovic's hazy vocals add the finishing touch, making each track instantly recognisable."

Sam Walker-Smart from Clash said "Following 2024's Pratts & Pain, Hickey doesn't tamper much with their winning formula. If anything, things feel slightly grander and more deliberate this time around." Walker-Smart continued "Once again, they've landed on the magic formula: that coming-of-age, memory-soaked, danceable indie we can't help but love."

Anthony Fantano of The Needle Drop rated the album a "Strong 1" (out of a possible 10 points), stating that he was "actually deeply shocked at just how vapid, substanceless, toothless, soulless it all is." Hickey would later be included on The Needle Drop's "Worst Albums of 2025" list.

== Track listing ==
Hickey track listing
No.	Title	Writer(s)	Producer(s)	Length
1.	"I Hate This Tune"	Royel Maddell; Otis Pavlovic; Blake Slatkin	Slatkin	3:31
2.	"Moody"	Maddell; Pavlovic; Amy Allen; Slatkin	Slatkin	2:55
3.	"Good Times"	Maddell; Pavlovic; J Lloyd	Lloyd	2:38
4.	"Torn Jeans"	Maddell; Pavlovic; Chris Collins	Collins	3:22
5.	"Come on Home"	Maddell; Pavlovic; Lydia Kitto; Lloyd	Lloyd; Kitto	2:56
6.	"Who's Your Boyfriend"	Maddell; Pavlovic; Allen; Slatkin	Slatkin	2:53
7.	"Car"	Maddell; Pavlovic; Omer Fedi; Slatkin	Slatki; Fedi	3:17
8.	"Shut Up"	Maddell; Pavlovic; Slatkin	Slatkin; Royel Otis	2:41
9.	"Dancing with Myself"	Maddell; Pavlovic; Kitto; Lloyd	Lloyd; Kitto	3:09
10.	"Say Something"	Maddell; Pavlovic; Fedi; Billy Walsh	Fedi	2:24
11.	"She's Got a Gun"	Maddell; Pavlovic; Lloyd	Lloyd	2:28
12.	"More to Lose"	Maddell; Pavlovic; Julian Bunetta; Fedi	Bunetta; Fedi	2:54
13.	"Jazz Burger"	Maddell; Pavlovic; Fedi; Slatkin	Slatkin; Fedi	3:11
Total length:				38:25

== Personnel ==
Credits adapted from Tidal.

=== Royel Otis ===
- Royel Maddell – guitar (all tracks), vocals (tracks 1–4, 6, 7, 10, 12, 13), percussion (2), bass (4, 7, 8, 10); keyboards, programming (4); background vocals (5, 9), piano (12)
- Otis Pavlovic – vocals (all tracks); keyboards, programming (3); bass (5, 9); drums, synthesizer, engineering (8); guitar (13)

=== Additional contributors ===
- Blake Slatkin – synthesizer, engineering 1, 2, 6–8); additional vocals, bass, guitar (1, 2, 6); drum programming (1, 6, 7), drums (1, 8), programming (2, 13); percussion, Wurlitzer electric piano (2); mixing, piano (13)
- Amy Allen – additional vocals (2)
- J Lloyd – guitar, programming, engineering (3, 5, 9, 11); bass, drums, keyboards (3, 5, 11)
- Chris Collins – bass, drums, keyboards, programming (4)
- Lydia Kitto – background vocals, bass, drums, keyboards (5, 9)
- Joey Waronker – drums, engineering (6, 7)
- Omer Fedi – bass (7, 10, 12, 13), synthesizer (7, 10, 12), guitar (7, 10, 13), drum programming (7), programming (10, 12, 13), drums (10, 13), vocals (10)
- Julian Bunetta – drums (12)
- Mark "Spike" Stent – mixing (1–6, 8, 9, 11)
- Ben Baptie – mixing (7)
- Serban Ghenea – mixing (10, 12)
- Randy Merrill – mastering (1, 3–13)
- Joe LaPorta – mastering (2)
- Michael Harris – engineering (1, 2, 4, 6, 7, 10, 12)
- Bryce Bordone – additional mixing (10, 12)

== Charts ==
=== Weekly charts ===
Weekly chart performance for Hickey
Chart (2025)	Peak position
Australian Albums (ARIA)	5
Austrian Albums (Ö3 Austria)	31
Belgian Albums (Ultratop Flanders)	20
Belgian Albums (Ultratop Wallonia)	122
Dutch Albums (Album Top 100)	14
French Albums (SNEP)	161
French Rock & Metal Albums (SNEP)	10
German Albums (Offizielle Top 100)	34
German Rock & Metal Albums (Offizielle Top 100)	12
New Zealand Albums (RMNZ)	32
Portuguese Albums (AFP)	144
Scottish Albums (Official Charts)	9
Swiss Albums (Schweizer Hitparade)	18
UK Albums (Official Charts)	14
US Billboard 200	151

=== Year-end charts ===
Year-end chart performance for Hickey
Chart (2025)	Position
Australian Artist Albums (ARIA)	8
