= Royel Otis =

Australian guitar-pop group

- Origin: Sydney, New South Wales, Australia
- Genres: Indie pop; indie rock; pop rock; new wave; psychedelic rock
- Years active: 2019–present
- Labels: Ourness; House Anxiety; Capitol Records
- Members: Royel Maddell; Otis Pavlovic
- Website: royelotis.com

Royel Otis is an Australian indie pop duo from Sydney, formed in 2019 by Royel Maddell and Otis Pavlovic. Their music encompasses the styles of indie rock, new wave, pop rock, post-punk and psychedelic rock. Royel Otis released three EPs, including Sofa Kings, before their debut studio album, Pratts & Pain, was released in February 2024. The duo won four awards at the 2024 ARIA Music Awards. Their second studio album, Hickey, was released on 22 August 2025.

== History ==
=== 2019–2023: Beginnings ===
Royel Maddell (born Leroy Francis Bressington) and Otis Pavlovic had known of each other around the Byron Bay area and had family friends in common before Pavlovic sent Maddell some demos in 2019. They bonded over their shared love of the same bands and music, with Maddell claiming this was "the collaboration he'd been chasing his whole life". Prior to Royel Otis, Maddell fronted the band Cabins in the mid-2010s and in 2018 released a solo EP entitled S.O.R.E. under the name Leroy Francis. The band name Royel Otis is a combination of the first names of Maddell and Pavlovic, respectively, with Royel being an anagram of Maddell's real name Leroy.

In October 2021, the duo released their debut EP Campus. This was followed in August 2022, with Bar n Grill of which included their breakthrough single "Oysters in My Pocket." Off the back of the single's success, Spotify selected Royel Otis for the platform's RADAR program. Their third EP Sofa Kings, released in March 2023, peaked at number 43 on the ARIA Charts following its physical release in July 2023. In September 2023, their song "Going Kokomo" was included in the EA Sports FC 24 soundtrack. Their song "Nack Nostalgia" was featured in The Sims 4; the duo also re-recorded their song in Simlish specifically for the game.

=== 2024–2025: Commercial breakthrough and Pratts & Pain ===
In January 2024, the Grammy Awards named Royel Otis as one of 25 Artists to Watch in 2024.' Later in January 2024, Royel Otis performed Like a Version cover of Sophie Ellis-Bextor's song "Murder on the Dancefloor" for Australian radio station Triple J. The cover went viral. It reached the ARIA Charts in February and reached No. 1 on the US Alternative Radio Chart in June.

Royel Otis' debut studio album Pratts & Pain was released on 16 February 2024, debuting at No. 1 on the ARIA Australian Albums Chart.

The duo performed a cover of the Cranberries' "Linger" for SiriusXM radio in April 2024. It became a viral global hit on social media and reached the Billboard Hot 100 in August 2024. The song was also featured in The Summer I Turned Pretty.

On 17 October 2024, Royel Otis made their US television debut performing "Sofa King" on Jimmy Kimmel Live! During the year, the duo played more than 100 sold out shows, selling over 100,000 tickets across Australia, the UK, Europe and the USA. Following their success in the US, Royel Otis were signed by Capitol Records in November 2024.

=== 2025–present: Hickey ===
In January 2025, their cover of "Murder on the Dancefloor" ranked No. 2 on Triple J Hottest 100 of 2024, with "Heading for the Door", "Foam" and "If Our Love Is Dead" also ranking. "Til the Morning", "Clawfoot" and their SiriusXM cover of "Linger" rounded out the Triple J Hottest 200, making Royel Otis one of the most represented artists featured in Triple J Hottest 100, 2024.

In May 2025, the duo released lead single "Moody" off their second studio album, Hickey. The song received backlash on social media, with commenters perceiving its lyrics to be misogynistic. The duo were also accused of silencing online criticism by deleting comments addressing the perceived misogynistic tone of the song and its accompanying video, which features what were believed to be visual allusions to Lolita. Whilst the duo themselves did not publicly comment on the backlash, a non-apology apology was issued through the band's management, with Kay and Hughes Arts and Entertainment Lawyers stating the song was "written from a specific perspective" and was "not intended to convey a broader view or standpoint about women in general".

The second single "Car" was released on 27 June 2025, accompanied by a music video filmed in New York City.

On 15 August 2025, Maddell collapsed onstage whilst performing at the MS Dockville festival in Hamburg, Germany. The band announced that Maddell's onstage collapse was due to a virus, and cancelled their upcoming performances at the Lowlands and Pukkelpop festivals.

Royel Otis' second album, Hickey, released on 22 August 2025. The same day, the music video for "Who's Your Boyfriend", featuring American actress Lola Tung, was released. The album peaked at number 5 on the ARIA Albums Chart.

== Legal issues ==
In early January 2026 it was widely reported that Leroy Bressington (Royel Maddell) had failed to convince the District Court of Northern California to compel Reddit to reveal the names, phone numbers, email addresses and IP addresses of anonymous Reddit users who had alleged on the online platform that Bressington had been found guilty of grooming and been involved in an inappropriate sexual relationship with a 16-year-old student whilst employed as her music teacher at Kings Cross Conservatorium in Sydney. Anonymous Reddit users had also alleged that Bressington was caught in the student's bedroom by her parents, reportedly broke both his legs jumping from her bedroom window to escape, was dropped by his record label and was blacklisted by radio station Triple J as a result.

Bressington's subpoena request was denied on 24 December 2025. According to the court docket, Bressington's legal team was "prepared to initiate" a defamation action if the Reddit users in question were also based in Australia; the filing did not explicitly state that a lawsuit would be brought. The court noted this ambiguity as part of its reasoning. Bressington's lawyer Ben Kay of Kay and Hughes Arts and Entertainment Lawyers had previously contacted Google earlier in 2025 to remove the Reddit threads from search results.

Judge William Alsup, in his judgment, described Bressington's application as both "overreaching" and "overburdensome", noting that the only allegations Bressington denied in his application were that an ex-partner accused him of sexual misconduct, that he was charged by authorities, and that Royel Otis were dropped from a record label. Judge Alsup noted that "nowhere in his application does Bressington specifically deny that he engaged in a nonconsensual sexual relationship with a minor". "As only one indication among others, Bressington has not specifically rejected as false one of the most basic assertions alleged: that when not a minor he had sex with a minor," court documents read. "Again, open questions linger, but while nothing now squarely limits the statutory authority to assist, much already informs the exercise of that authority in accord with sound discretion." Judge Alsup noted that Bressington had "not yet filed even a placeholder complaint against John Does in a foreign court," and that "it would be unusual to request a court’s assistance to obtain discovery in advance of litigation." Judge Alsup wrote that "no litigation to stop these statements has been filed anywhere in the world," and "so far as we know, Bressington never has put pen to paper to inform any government authority anywhere in the world about the matters that concern this application, until submitting it now."

Casey Epstein-Gross of The A.V. Club observed that "in trying to scrub [the allegations] from the realm of deeply-online rumor, Bressington instead upgraded them to headlines - ones that will almost certainly outlive whatever Reddit discourse cycle prompted the application in the first place. He didn't clear his name. He didn't refute the allegation. He didn't even manage to file a lawsuit. What he did do was invite a federal judge to point out, on the record, that he never denied the claim at all. Oops."

On 4 February 2026 The Sydney Morning Herald reported that high-profile barrister Sue Chrysanthou had been brought in to assist Bressington mount defamation proceedings in Australia over anonymous Reddit posts. If one of the alleged defamatory Reddit comments is indexed by Google, this "could offer Bressington's legal team another route to action". The Sydney Morning Herald stated "you can trust we'll be watching on with great interest."

When the band was asked by Spin to comment on the allegations, a representative for the band stated that "the rumors circulating on the internet by anonymous trolls are entirely false."

== Members ==
- Otis Pavlovic – lead vocals, rhythm guitar, piano
- Royel Maddell – lead guitar, backing vocals, bass, synthesizer

Current touring musicians

- Tim Ayre – keyboards, synthesizer, backing vocals (2019–present)
- Tim Commandeur – drums (2024–present)

Former touring musicians

- Julian Sudek – drums (2019–2024)

== Discography ==
- Pratts & Pain (2024)
- Hickey (2025)

== Awards and nominations ==
=== AIR Awards ===
The Australian Independent Record Awards (commonly known informally as AIR Awards) is an annual awards night to recognise, promote and celebrate the success of Australia's Independent Music sector.

Year	Nominee / work	Award	Result	Ref.
2024	Royel Otis	Breakthrough Independent Artist of the Year	Won	
2024	Sofa Kings	Best Independent Rock Album or EP	Nominated	
2025	Pratts & Pain	Independent Album of the Year	Nominated	
2025	Pratts & Pain	Best Independent Rock Album or EP	Nominated	
2025	Ourness and The Annex for Pratts & Pain	Independent Marketing Team of the Year	Won	
2025	Thinking Loud for Pratts & Pain	Independent Publicity Team of the Year	Won	

=== APRA Awards ===
The APRA Awards are held in Australia and New Zealand by the Australasian Performing Right Association to recognise songwriting skills, sales and airplay performance by its members annually.

Year	Nominee / work	Award	Result	Ref.
2024	Otis Pavlovic & Royel Maddell	Emerging Songwriter of the Year	Nominated	
2025	"Heading for the Door" (Otis Pavlovic, Royel Maddell, Daniel Carey)	Song of the Year	Shortlisted	
2025	Otis Pavlovic & Royel Maddell	Emerging Songwriter of the Year	Won	
2026	"Car" (Otis Pavlovic, Royel Maddell, Omar Fedi, Blake Slatkin)	Most Performed Alternative Work	Nominated	

=== ARIA Music Awards ===
The ARIA Music Awards is an annual award ceremony event celebrating the Australian music industry.

Year	Nominee / work	Award	Result	Ref.
2023	Sofa Kings	Michael Gudinski Breakthrough Artist	Nominated	
2024	Pratts & Pain	Album of the Year	Nominated	
2024	Pratts & Pain	Best Group	Won	
2024	Pratts & Pain	Best Rock Album	Won	
2024	Pratts & Pain	Best Independent Release	Nominated	
2024	"Murder on the Dance Floor" (Triple J Like a Version)	Song of the Year	Nominated	
2024	Pratts & Pain Tour	Australian Live Act	Nominated	
2024	Chris Collins for Royel Otis - Pratts & Pain	Best Produced Release	Won	
2024	Chris Collins for Royel Otis - Pratts & Pain	Best Engineered Release	Won	
2025	Hickey	Best Group	Nominated	
2025	Hickey	Best Rock Album	Nominated	
2025	Jamieson Kerr for Royel Otis – "Car"	Best Video	Nominated	
2025	"Linger" (SiriusXM Session)	Song of the Year	Nominated	
2026	"Car"	Song of the Year	Nominated	

=== J Awards ===
The J Awards are an annual series of Australian music awards that were established by the Australian Broadcasting Corporation's youth-focused radio station Triple J. They commenced in 2005.

Year	Nominee / work	Award	Result	Ref.
2023	"Kool Aid"	Australian Video of the Year	Nominated	
2024	Pratts & Pain	Australian Album of the Year	Nominated	

=== NSW Music Prize ===
The NSW Music Prize aims to "celebrate, support and incentivise" the NSW's most talented artists, with "the aim of inspiring the next generations of stars". It commenced in 2025.

Year	Nominee / work	Award	Result	Ref.
2025	Royel Otis	NSW Breakthrough Artist of the Year	Nominated	

=== Rolling Stone Australia Awards ===
The Rolling Stone Australia Awards are awarded annually by the Australian edition of Rolling Stone magazine for outstanding contributions to popular culture in the previous year.

Year	Nominee / work	Award	Result	Ref.
2024	Royel Otis	Best New Artist	Nominated	
2025	"If Our Love Is Dead"	Best Single	Shortlisted	
