= Pacific Avenue =

Australian alternative rock group

- Origin: Gerringong, New South Wales, Australia
- Genre: Alternative rock
- Years active: 2017–present
- Label: BMG
- Members: Harry O'Brien; Ben Fryer; Jack Kay; Dom Littrich
- Website: pacificavenue.com.au

Pacific Avenue are an Australian alternative rock group formed in 2017 and consisting of Harry O’Brien on vocals and guitar, Ben Fryer on lead guitar, Jack Kay on bass and vocals, and Dom Littrich on drums. They have supported acts such as San Cisco, the Belligerents and British India and released their debut album in May 2023.

== History ==
=== 2017–2021: Formation and Strawberry Skies ===
Pacific Avenue released their debut single "In Your Arms" in May 2017, followed by "Sally" in early 2018 and "Excuse Me" in October 2018.

On 16 August 2019, the group released their debut EP, Strawberry Skies with the group saying "The collection of songs on this EP were written at a time where we were all living together in a little beach shack in Woonona. This was our first time out of home and we were all experiencing the surreal and wonderful feeling of absolute freedom. During this time strong relationships were made, parties were frequent, and we were starting to understand ourselves individually. The songs on the EP encapsulate this feeling and tell of the story's and emotions which come with the freedom of youth." The EP was produced by Adrian Breakespear and was supported with a national tour.

=== 2022–2023: Flowers ===
In April 2022, it was announced the group had signed with BMG.

The group released their debut studio album Flowers on 5 May 2023. The album was preceded by the singles "Easy Love", "Give It Up for Yourself", "Leaving for London" and "Spin Me Like Your Records".

=== 2024–present: Lovesick Sentimental ===
On 15 November 2024, the group released "Lucy", the first single since Flowers.

In November 2025, the group released "Here We Go Again" and announced their second album Lovesick Sentimental would be released in March 2026. In June 2026, the group performed "I Say a Little Prayer" for Like a Version.

== Members ==
- Harry O'Brien – vocals, guitar
- Ben Fryer – lead guitar
- Jack Kay – bass guitar, vocals
- Dom Littrich – drums, vocals

== Discography ==
=== Albums ===
List of studio albums, with selected details
Title	Album details	Peak chart positions
Title	Album details	AUS
Flowers	Released: 5 May 2023; Format: CD, LP, cassette, digital; Label: BMG (538898902)	3
Lovesick Sentimental	Released: 27 February 2026; Format: CD, LP, digital; Label: BMG (964216022)	17

=== Extended plays ===
List of EPs, with selected details
Title	EP details
Strawberry Skies	Released: 16 August 2019; Format: CD, digital; Label: Pacific Avenue

=== Certified songs ===
Title	Year	Certifications	Album
"Something Good"	2019	ARIA: Gold	Strawberry Skies

== Awards and nominations ==
=== AIR Awards ===
The Australian Independent Record Awards (commonly known informally as AIR Awards) is an annual awards night to recognise, promote and celebrate the success of Australia's Independent Music sector.

Year	Nominee / work	Award	Result	Ref.
2024	Pacific Avenue	Breakthrough Independent Artist of the Year	Nominated	
2024	Flowers	Best Independent Rock Album or EP	Nominated	

=== ARIA Music Awards ===
The ARIA Music Awards is an annual award ceremony event celebrating the Australian music industry.

Year	Nominee / work	Award	Result	Ref.
2023	Flowers	Michael Gudinski Breakthrough Artist	Nominated	
2023	Flowers	Best Rock Album	Nominated	
