= Chris Collins (Australian musician) =

Australian musician (born c. 1987)

- Born: c. 1987
- Origin: Sydney, Australia
- Genre: Indie pop
- Occupations: Musician, producer, audio engineer, songwriter
- Instruments: Guitar, vocals
- Formerly of: The View; Tigertown

Christopher Glen Collins (born c. 1987) is an Australian songwriter, guitarist, audio engineer, music producer, and singer. He was formerly in the bands The View (2005–2011) and Tigertown (2011–2017). He is known for his collaborations with Matt Corby and Tyne-James Organ, and has produced and engineered music for Pacific Avenue, Royel Otis, Old Mervs, and many others.

== Early life and education ==
Christopher Glen Collins was born around 1987. He is from Sydney.

== Early bands ==
=== The View ===
Collins was in a band called The View from the age of 18 (2005) until 2011, in which he was guitarist and singer. Other members were Marcus Beaumont on guitar; Mitchell Serena on keyboards and vocals; Joel Geering on bass; and Daniel Hunt on drums. Their debut recording was the EP Delicate Girl, and they played regular gigs around Australia, both as the main act and supporting others, such as Switchfoot (US), Brooke Fraser (NZ), and Kisschasy. They were also played on commercial radio stations. In August 2006, The View featured as a Triple J Unearthed band, featuring the track "Tonight".

=== Tigertown ===
Collins was songwriter, singer, and guitarist in the indie pop band Tigertown, which formed in 2011. Chris and his then wife Charlie Collins wrote their songs; Charlie's sister Crystal sang and played mandolin; their brother Kurt was the drummer; Chris' sister Elodie was on bass; and their brother Alexi played keyboards. Collins said in a 2016 interview that their music was influenced by the music that they heard growing up, especially Fleetwood Mac, but also Michael Jackson, Whitney Houston, and Phil Collins – "kind of feel good pop songs from those eras".

Their first EP was Tigertown, released in 2011, and in that year they were the support act for Matt Corby, Husky, Emma Louise, and Founds. In November/December 2012 they toured various cities in New South Wales, Queensland, and Victoria.

They were a Triple J Unearthed feature artist in 2013, when their members were listed as Chris, Charlie, Alexi, Kurt, and Elodie. They played in Sydney (where they were based) and toured to Brisbane, Adelaide, Fremantle, and Melbourne to promote their release Wandering Eyes. Tigertown released six EPs, starting with Tigertown in 2011 and ending with Warriors in 2017, and were especially known for their songs "Lonely Cities" and "Papernote". According to the staff writer for The Music in 2012, "Their sound is a gorgeous wash of song and subtlety – quiet and layered... [Chris] Collins specifically avoids words such as 'folk'. One gets the feeling he doesn't want his band (or its members) to become some kind of product".

In 2015, Tigertown toured the United States. In February 2016, they released a new "dance-party" EP called Lonely Cities, which at one week later reached No. 17 on the iTunes chart. They started performing songs from the EP, and were planning a national tour of Australia in April, their first headline tour in two years.

In February 2018, Tigertown, then consisting of just four members: Chris, Charlie, Elodie and Alexi, announced their breakup.

== Collaborations ==
In 2021 Collins collaborated with Budjerah, MAY-A, and Matt Corby on a song called "Talk", which featured as a track on Budjerah's 2022 EP Conversations.

Collins produced Pacific Avenue's April 2022 single "Give it up for yourself", which was also included on their debut album Flowers in May 2023. Collins produced all but one of the other tracks on the album as well. He co-wrote the song "Reelin'" with Matt Corby and Nat Dunn, which was released as a single by Corby in early 2023, and included in his album third album Everything's Fine.

Collins contributed to the 2023 K-pop album The Name Chapter: Freefall by South Korean boy band Tomorrow X Together, as co-writer on the track "Dreamer".

Collins co-produced and engineered guitar-pop duo Royel Otis's album Pratts & Pain, released in February 2024, which won Best Engineered Release and Best Produced Release in the 2024 ARIA Awards. Also in 2024, Collins was producer, co-writer and a contributor to the Teenage Dads' second studio album Majordomo, released in August 2024.

He produced Perth indie-rockers Old Mervs' singles "What You've Lost" (released June 2024) "Forget It" (September 2024), and "See You Again" (December 2024). Their upcoming (2025) album, comprising 11 tracks, was recorded in Collins' studios.

He has also collaborated with many other artists, as producer as well as songwriter, including: Jessy Fury, Ruby Fields, The Terrys, Dan Sultan, Lost Tropics, and the Vanns.

Collins works at Music Farm Studio, a well-equipped recording studio situated on a 4.5-hectare (11-acre) property near Coorabell, in the hinterland of Byron Bay, New South Wales.

== Personal life ==
Collins married Charlene Bailey (who had played in a band with her siblings before Tigertown), now known as Charlie Collins. Their marriage ended around 2018–2019 and they later divorced. Chris produced Charlie's first solo album, Snowpine, in 2019.

== Awards and nominations ==
=== APRA Music Awards ===
The APRA Music Awards were established by Australasian Performing Right Association (APRA) in 1982 to honour the achievements of songwriters and music composers, and to recognise their song writing skills, sales and airplay performance, by its members annually.

Year	Nominee / work	Award	Result	Ref.
2026	"Everyone Will See It" by Old Mervs (Henry Carrington-Jones / Chris Collins / David House)	Most Performed Rock Work	Nominated	

=== ARIA Music Awards ===
The ARIA Music Awards is an annual award ceremony event celebrating the Australian music industry.

Year	Nominee / work	Award	Result	Ref.
2023	Matt Corby, Chris Collins, Nat Dunn, Alex Henrikssen for Matt Corby – Everything's Fine	Best Produced Release	Nominated	
2023	Dann Hume, Chris Collins, Matt Corby for Matt Corby – Everything's Fine	Best Engineered Release	Nominated	
2024	Chris Collins for Royel Otis - Pratts & Pain	Best Produced Release	Won	
2024	Chris Collins for Royel Otis - Pratts & Pain	Best Engineered Release	Won	

=== MPEG Awards ===
The Music Producer and Engineers’ Guild (MPEG Awards) Awards celebrate excellence in music production and engineering in Australia. They commenced in 2024.

Year	Nominee / work	Award	Result	Ref.
2025	Chris Collins	Producer of the Year	Won	
