= ARIA Award for Best Hip Hop Release =

Annual Australian music industry award

ARIA Award for Best Soul/R&B Release
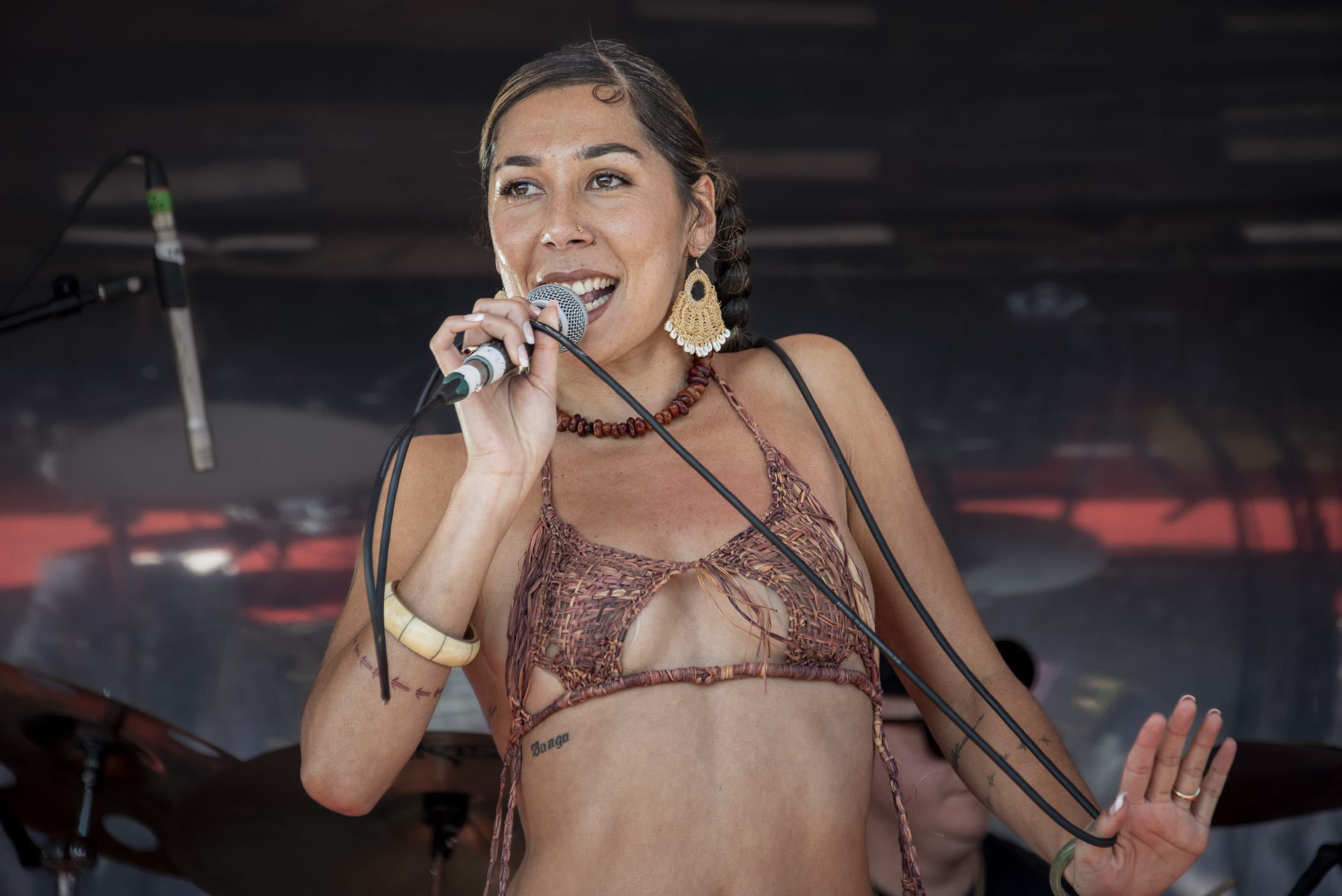
- 2026 winner Miss Kaninna
- Country: Australia
- Presented by: Australian Recording Industry Association (ARIA)
- First award: 2019
- Currently held by: Miss Kaninna, Blackprint (2026)

Highlights
- Most wins: Genesis Owusu and Sampa the Great (2 each)
- Most nominations: The Kid Laroi (5)
- Website: ariaawards.com.au

The ARIA Music Award for Best Hip Hop Release, is an award presented at the annual ARIA Music Awards, which recognises "the many achievements of Aussie artists across all music genres", since 1987. It is handed out by the Australian Recording Industry Association (ARIA), an organisation whose aim is "to advance the interests of the Australian record industry." A previous category, Best Urban Release, was split into Best Soul/R&B Release and Best Hip Hop Release, which were first presented in 2019.

To be eligible, the work must be within the hip-hop genre. The nominated release must qualify for inclusion in the ARIA Album Chart, and cannot be entered in any other genre categories. The accolade is voted for by a judging school, which comprises between 40 and 100 members of representatives experienced in this genre, and is given to an artist who is either from Australia or an Australian resident. The award for Best Hip Hop Release was first presented to Sampa the Great for the single, "Final Form".

As of 2026, Genesis Owusu and Sampa the Great are the only artists with multiple wins; both artists won both their nominations, with Sampa the Great winning in consecutive years. The Kid Laroi has the most nominations with five, though he has never won. Three non-Australian artists have been nominated as featured or co-lead artists; American rapper JPEGMafia for "Awake" with Tkay Maidza in 2019, New Zealand rapper JessB for "Meditjin" with Baker Boy in 2020 and American rapper Fivio Foreign for "Paris to Tokyo" with The Kid Laroi in 2022.

== Winners and nominees ==
In the following table, the winner is highlighted in a separate colour, and in boldface; the nominees are those that are not highlighted or in boldface.

Year	Winner(s)	Album/single title
**2019** (33rd)
**2019** (33rd)	**Sampa the Great**	**"Final Form"**
**2019** (33rd)	Baker Boy	"Cool as Hell"
**2019** (33rd)	Hilltop Hoods	The Great Expanse
**2019** (33rd)	Illy	"Then What"
**2019** (33rd)	Tkay Maidza featuring JPEGMafia	"Awake"
**2020** (34th)
**2020** (34th)	**Sampa the Great**	**The Return**
**2020** (34th)	Baker Boy featuring JessB	"Meditjin"
**2020** (34th)	Briggs	Always Was
**2020** (34th)	Illy	"Last Laugh"
**2020** (34th)	The Kid Laroi	F*ck Love
**2021** (35th)
**2021** (35th)	**Genesis Owusu**	**Smiling with No Teeth**
**2021** (35th)	B Wise	jamie
**2021** (35th)	Masked Wolf	"Astronaut in the Ocean"
**2021** (35th)	The Kid Laroi	"Without You"
**2021** (35th)	Youngn Lipz	Area Baby
**2022** (36th)
**2022** (36th)	**Baker Boy**	**Gela**
**2022** (36th)	Barkaa	Blak Matriarchy
**2022** (36th)	Chillinit	Family Ties
**2022** (36th)	Day1 (featuring Kahukx)	"Mbappé"
**2022** (36th)	The Kid Laroi and Fivio Foreign	"Paris to Tokyo"
**2023** (37th)
**2023** (37th)	**Genesis Owusu**	**Struggler**
**2023** (37th)	Kahukx	"Nothing to Something"
**2023** (37th)	Kerser	A Gift & a Kers
**2023** (37th)	Onefour (featuring CG)	"Comma's"
**2023** (37th)	Tkay Maidza and Flume	"Silent Assassin"
**2024** (38th)
**2024** (38th)	**3%**	**Kill the Dead**
**2024** (38th)	Kobie Dee	Chapter 26
**2024** (38th)	Lithe	"Fall Back"
**2024** (38th)	Onefour	"Natural Habitat"
**2024** (38th)	The Kid Laroi	The First Time [Deluxe Version]
**2025** (39th)
**2025** (39th)	**Barkaa**	**Big Tidda**
**2025** (39th)	Hilltop Hoods	Fall from the Light
**2025** (39th)	Miss Kaninna	Kaninna
**2025** (39th)	Onefour	Look at Me Now
**2025** (39th)	The Kid Laroi	"Baby I'm Back"
**2026** (40th)
**2026** (40th)	**Miss Kaninna**	**Blackprint**
**2026** (40th)	Baker Boy	Djandjay
**2026** (40th)	Devaura	Vol. 2 If You Don't Laugh, You'll Cry
**2026** (40th)	Hilltop Hoods	"Never Coming Home"
**2026** (40th)	Nerve	Growing Pains

== Artists with multiple wins ==
2 wins

- Genesis Owusu
- Sampa the Great

== Artists with multiple nominations ==
5 nominations

- The Kid Laroi

4 nominations

- Baker Boy

3 nominations

- Hilltop Hoods
- Onefour

2 nominations

- Barkaa
- Illy
- Kahukx
- Tkay Maidza
- Miss Kaninna
- Genesis Owusu
- Sampa the Great
