= Cool as Hell =

2019 single by Baker Boy

Single by Baker Boy

from the album Gela
- Released: 25 January 2019
- Length: 3:06
- Label: Danzal Baker; Island; Universal
- Songwriters: Brendan Tuckerman; Carl Dimataga; Dallas Woods; Danzal Baker; Jesse Ferris; Morgan Jones
- Producers: Jones; Dimataga

Baker Boy singles chronology
"Black Magic" (2018)	"Cool as Hell" (2019)	"In Control" (2019)

Music video
- "Cool as Hell" on YouTube

"Cool as Hell" is a song by Australian musician Baker Boy, released on 25 January 2019 as the lead single from his debut album Gela (2021).

"Cool as Hell" was certified gold in Australia in 2020, and received nominations for Best Hip Hop Release and Best Video at the 2019 ARIA Music Awards and for Most Performed Urban Work of the Year at the 2020 APRA Awards.

== Music video ==
The music video was directed by Gabriel Gasparinatos and released on 21 February 2018. The video also features Baker Boy dancing with his brother Adam and father Josiah, something that was a "last minute decision" according to Gasparinatos. Gasparinatos said "I wanted to map Danzal's journey and visualise how a young boy from North East Arnhem Land made it onto the world stage. I felt that epitomised the clip's meaning and intention and really brought it home." Baker Boy said "'Cool as Hell' is about letting the music take control of your body and that's exactly what the film clip does too. It makes you feel bright and happy. Just makes you want to feel the music and dance."

== Critical reception ==
Peter Tuskan from The Music Network called it a "musical masterpiece which features funky bass lines and Baker Boy’s never-before-seen vocal range."

== Certifications ==
Region	Certification	Certified units/sales
Australia (ARIA)	Platinum	70,000^{‡}
^{‡} Sales+streaming figures based on certification alone.
