= National Indigenous Music Awards 2019 =

Annual Australian music awards ceremony

- Date: 12 August 2019
- Venue: The Amphitheatre Botanical Gardens, Northern Territory, Australia

Highlights
- Most wins: Mojo Juju (2)
- Most nominations: Mojo Juju (3)
- Website: nima.musicnt.com.au

Television/radio coverage
- Network: National Indigenous Television

The National Indigenous Music Awards 2019 were the 16th annual National Indigenous Music Awards.

The nominations were announced on 18 July 2019 and the awards ceremony was held on 12 August 2019. NIMA Reference Group Chair, Warren H. Williams said "In the past year, Indigenous music has continued its meteoric rise to the top of music in Australia, pushing boundaries and finding its place at the forefront of art in our country. The NIMAs follows that rise ready to recognise and amplify the voices of our musicians on their journey upwards."

Judging of the National Indigenous Music Awards was split for the first time, with 50% of votes coming from a panel of prominent Indigenous Australians and community leaders and 50% from a panel of Indigenous and non-Indigenous media and music industry representatives.

== Performers ==
- Archie Roach
- Jessica Mauboy
- Dan Sultan
- Electric Fields
- Tasman Keith
- Spinifex Gum
- Deborah Cheetham
- Kenbi Dancers
- Eric Avery

== Hall of Fame inductee ==
- Tiddas and Wilma Reading

Tiddas formed in 1990 by Lou Bennett, Sally Dastey and Amy Saunders and signed to PolyGram Records. They released their first EP Inside My Kitchen in 1992, and were nominated for two ARIA Award nominations at the ARIA Music Awards of 1993. Their 1993 debut album, Sing About Life was certified gold and won the ARIA Award for Best Indigenous Release at the ARIA Music Awards of 1994. Their self-titled album was released in 1996 and a third album was released in 1997, before calling it a day in 2000.

Wilma Reading began her career in 1959 singing for friends at the Brisbane Jazz Club before heading to the USA where she released singles, performed on The Tonight Show Starring Johnny Carson, toured with Duke Ellington held down a residency in New Yorks famed Copacabana nightclub and played the London Palladium. She performed across the world with orchestras, in movies (alongside Jim Brown in Pacific Inferno) and on TV across five continents.

== Triple J Unearthed National Indigenous Winner ==
- Dallas Woods

Dallas Woods grew up in the town of Wyndham in the East Kimberleys and is a Noongar man. Woods writes takedowns of the system around him, taking aim at the structures that unjustly work against the remote Indigenous Communities throughout the country. In 2018, Woods uploaded his first track "9x Out of 10" to his Triple J Unearthed profile and has toured nationally with Baker Boy, appearing on his single "Black Magic" and shares songwriting credits on "Mr La Di Da Di".

== Special Recognition award ==
- Djuki Mala

== Archie Roach Foundation Award ==
The inaugural Archie Roach Foundation Award for an emerging NT artist was awarded to Mambali.

== Awards ==
Artist of the Year

Artist	Result
Archie Roach	Nominated
Baker Boy	Won
Briggs	Nominated
Electric Fields	Nominated
Jessica Mauboy	Nominated
Mojo Juju	Nominated

New Talent of the Year

Artist	Result
Dallas Woods	Nominated
Kaiit	Won
Kobie Dee	Nominated
Mambali Band	Nominated
Tasman Keith	Nominated

Album of the Year

Artist and album	Result
Archie Roach – The Concert Collection 2012–2018	Nominated
Dan Sultan – Aviary Takes	Nominated
Mojo Juju – Native Tongue	Won
Tia Gostelow – Thick Skin	Nominated
Thelma Plum – Better in Blak	Nominated

Film Clip of the Year

Artist and song	Result
Briggs featuring Greg Holden – "Life is Incredible"	Won
Mojo Juju – "Native Tongue"	Nominated
Tasman Keith featuring Stevie Jean – "Prey"	Nominated
Thelma Plum – "Better in Blak"	Nominated
Yirrmal – "For Everyone"	Nominated

Song of the Year

Artist and song	Result
Baker Boy – "Black Magic"	Nominated
Electric Fields – "2000 and Whatever"	Nominated
Mojo Juju – "Native Tongue"	Won
Tasman Keith featuring Stevie Jean – "Prey"	Nominated
Yirrmal – "For Everyone"	Nominated

Community Clip of the Year

Artist and song	Result
Deni Mob – "State of the Heart"	Won
Peppi School – "Play Good Way"	Nominated
Numbulwar School Band – "What's the Reason?"	Nominated
Tiwi College – "Picka Family"	Nominated
