= National Indigenous Music Awards 2020 =

Annual Australian music awards ceremony

- Date: 8 August 2020
- Venue: Northern Territory, Australia
- Hosted by: Elaine Crombie and Steven Oliver

Highlights
- Most wins: Baker Boy (3)
- Website: nima.musicnt.com.au

Television/radio coverage
- Network: National Indigenous Television

The National Indigenous Music Awards 2020 were the 17th annual National Indigenous Music Awards.

The nominations were announced on 13 July 2020 and the awards ceremony was held on 8 August 2020 and broadcast on the National Indigenous Television and simulcast across the country on Facebook, Double J, NIRS, Twitter and YouTube.

== Performers ==
- Archie Roach
- Thelma Plum
- Miiesha
- Midnight Oil - "Gadigal Land"
- Neil Murray, Christine Anu, Mau Power, Jim Moginie and Rob Hirst - "My Island Home"

== Hall of Fame inductee ==
- Ruby Hunter

Ruby Hunter was born in 1955, on the banks of the Murray River in South Australia, Hunter was a Ngarrindjeri, Kokatha and Pitjantjatjara woman. During her lifetime, Hunter cut several landmark records. Her song "Down City Streets" appeared on Archie Roach's debut Charcoal Lane from 1990, and in 1994, she became the first Indigenous woman to release a solo album with the ARIA Award-nominated Thoughts Within. A second album, Feeling Good was released in 2000. Hunter died in 2010.

== Triple J Unearthed National Indigenous Winner ==
JK-47 is a rapper from Tweed Heads South, New South Wales. JK-47 is best known for his appearance on Nerve's 2019 single "Sunday Roast". He released the tracks "The Recipe" in May 2020 and "I Am Here (Trust Me)" in July 2020.

== Archie Roach Foundation Award ==
The second Archie Roach Foundation Award for an emerging NT artist was awarded to Kee'Anh.

== Awards ==
Artist of the Year

Artist	Result
Archie Roach	Nominated
Baker Boy	Won
Electric Fields	Nominated
Emily Wurramara	Nominated
Jessica Mauboy	Nominated
Mau Power	Nominated
Thelma Plum	Nominated

New Talent of the Year

Artist	Result
Allara	Nominated
Dallas Woods	Nominated
Kee'Ahn	Nominated
Miiesha	Won
Mitch Tambo	Nominated

Album of the Year

Artist and album	Result
Archie Roach - Tell Me Why	Won
Jessica Mauboy - Hilda	Nominated
Mau Power - Blue Lotus the Awakening	Nominated
Miiesha - Nyaaringu	Nominated
Ray Dimakarri Dixon - Standing Strong Mudburra Man	Nominated

Film Clip of the Year

Artist and song	Result
Baker Boy ft. JessB - "Meditjin"	Won
Briggs ft. Tim Minchin - "House Fyre"	Nominated
Dallas Woods - "If It Glitters It's Gold"	Nominated
Miiesha - "Drowning"	Nominated
Tasman Keith - "Billy Bad Again"	Nominated

Song of the Year

Artist and song	Result
Alice Skye - "I Feel Better But I Don't Feel Good"	Nominated
Baker Boy ft. JessB - "Meditjin"	Won
Briggs ft. Tim Minchin - "House Fyre"	Nominated
Electric Fields & Keiino - "Would I Lie"	Nominated
Kee'Ahn - "Better Things"	Nominated
Thelma Plum - "Homecoming Queen"	Nominated

Community Clip of the Year

Artist and song	Result
Booningbah Goories	Nominated
Bwgcolman Mob	Nominated
Githabul Next Generation	Nominated
Iron Range Danger Gang	Nominated
KDA Crew	Won
Ntaria Connect	Nominated

Indigenous Language Award

Artist and song	Result
Rrawun Maymuru & Nick Wales - "Nyapililngu (Spirit Lady)"	Won
Stuart Nugget - "Nayurni (Woman)"	Won
