= Djandjay =

Studio album by Baker Boy
- Released: 10 October 2025
- Length: 38:24
- Languages: English; Yolŋu Matha; Burarra
- Labels: Island Australia; Universal Australia
- Producers: Robert Amoruso; Mark Benedicto; Gloria Kaba; Pat Morrissey; Pip Norman; Rudy; Styalz Fuego

Baker Boy chronology
| Gela (2021) | Djandjay (2025) |

Singles from Djandjay
- 1. "Peacekeeper" Released: 14 March 2025; 2. "Freak Out" Released: 23 May 2025; 3. "Lightning" Released: 25 July 2025; 4. "Thick Skin" Released: 5 September 2025; 5. "Running Low" Released: 10 October 2025

Singles from Djandjay (Deluxe)
- 1. "Curse" Released: 15 May 2026; 2. "Yolŋu Fever" Released: 21 August 2026

Djandjay is the second studio album by Indigenous Australian rapper Baker Boy. The album was released on 10 October 2025 through Island Records Australia and Universal Music Australia.

Baker said the album title is named after his late grandmother and a Yolŋu spiritual figure — an octopus spirit said to guide souls. Baker Boy said "Djandjay is about truth. It's about strength and defiance. I put my whole self into this album – and it feels like all of me is in there." Baker Boy also said, "This is my strongest, most powerful work yet."

Baker Boy also said "Djandjay is me stepping into a new era, owning my music, my art and my direction. This body of work is wholly me and everything I stand for. It's proud, it's Blak, it's vulnerable, it's angry, it's nuanced. I'm here to show everyone that I'm more than what they expect of me."

The album has five interconnected music videos filmed inside Werribee Mansion.

The album will be supported by an Australian tour in April and May 2026 and appearances at Perth Festival and WOMADelaide 2026.

At the 2025 J Awards, the album was nominated for Australian Album of the Year.

At the National Indigenous Music Awards 2026, the album won for Album of the Year. At the 2026 ARIA Music Awards it was nominated for Best Hip Hop / Rap Release, Best Solo Artist and Best Cover Art. The album was shortlisted for the 2026 Australian Music Prize.

A deluxe version was released on 21 August 2026, with three new tracks.

== Promotion ==
=== Singles ===
"Peacekeeper" was released on 14 March 2025 as the album's lead single. Emma Mack from The Music described the song as a "gritty, energetic and uplifting track" that is "tackling themes of prioritising your own self-worth and personal peace."

"Freak Out" was released as the second single on 23 May 2025. Baker Boy said the song "is all about the bratty energy, it's a bit of an f you to the man, to the 'grown ups' and to the system but done in kind of a cheeky and playful way. It hits on the very real experiences of being a Yolŋu man in the city and living in the white world."

"Lightning" was released as the third single on 25 July 2025. Baker Boy said "It has this kind of cheeky arrogance to it, but during the writing process, I was touching on the pressures and expectations I feel to kind of be this perfect role model and I guess coming to terms with not being able to make everyone happy." It in, Baker Boy sings in three languages, Yolŋu Matha, English and Burarra.

"Thick Skin" was released on 5 September 2025. In interviews, Baker Boy explained that the song was fuelled by his anger after the failed 2023 Indigenous Voice referendum and ongoing attacks on First Nations people. At the National Indigenous Music Awards 2026, the song won Film Clip of the Year and Song of the Year.

"Running Low" was released on 10 October 2025 as the fifth single.. About the single, Baker Boy said "I was talking about being on the road, the pressure to create — but also the sacrifice of living away from community, of missing funerals and carrying that weight. It was a favourite from the demo, originally, I sang the hook, but bringing in Pardyalone gave it this crazy energy. His voice just hits."

== Artwork ==
The album's cover art has Baker Boy in a black Gucci suit and draped in a handwoven Pandanus mat made by his family. This is traditionally used for fishnets and baskets. Baker Boy said, "It's a reminder of home, of culture, and of the support I carry with me even when I'm far from community."

== Reception ==
Joseph Guenzler from National Indigenous Times said "Where Gela introduced audiences to Baker Boy's vibrant energy and party anthems, the new record reveals a more mature and layered side tackling resilience, identity and growth."

Lauren McNamara from Rolling Stone Australia called it Baker Boy's "most powerful, strongest work yet." and said "It blends ancestral influences with sharp-edged global production, folding in Yolŋu Matha, English, and Burarra across a dynamic soundscape that spans hip-hop, punk, gospel, and electronic textures." The Australian called it "bold, unflinching and beautifully striking".

== Track listing ==
Djandjay track listing
| No. | Title | Writer(s) | Producer(s) | Length |
|---|---|---|---|---|
| 1. | "Biggest Mob" | Danzal Baker; Robert Amoruso; Kaelyn Behr; Pip Norman; Ziggy Ramo | Amoruso; Norman; Rudy; Styalz Fuego | 2:40 |
| 2. | "Peacekeeper" | Baker; Rob Amoruso; Mark Benedicto; Norman; Redd | Amoruso; Norman; Benedicto | 2:57 |
| 3. | "Keep Up" | Baker; Amoruso; Norman; Ramo | Amoruso; Norman | 3:16 |
| 4. | "Freak Out" (featuring Briggs and Haiku Hands) | Baker; Amoruso; Adam Briggs; Haiku Hands; Norman; Ramo; Redd | Amoruso; Norman | 4:02 |
| 5. | "Djapa (Interlude)" | Baker; Amoruso; Norman | Amoruso; Norman | 0:15 |
| 6. | "Mad Dog" | Baker; Amoruso; B Wise; Pat Morrissey; Norman; Ramo | Amoruso; Norman; Morrissey | 3:14 |
| 7. | "Running Low" (featuring Pardyalone) | Baker; Amoruso; Kalvin Beal; Norman; Ramo | Amoruso; Norman | 2:57 |
| 8. | "Mala (Interlude)" | Baker; Amoruso; Norman | Amoruso; Norman | 0:41 |
| 9. | "Thick Skin" (featuring Thelma Plum, Emma Donovan, Kee'Anh, and Jada Weazel) | Baker; Amoruso; Emma Donovan; Kee'Anh; Norman; Thelma Plum; Jada Weazel | Amoruso; Norman | 4:06 |
| 10. | "Amala (Interlude)" | Baker; Amoruso; Norman | Amoruso; Norman | 0:18 |
| 11. | "Lightning" (featuring Redd) | Baker; Amoruso; Norman; Redd | Amoruso; Benedicto; Norman | 3:27 |
| 12. | "Menace" | Baker; Amoruso; Jacob Farah; Norman | Amoruso; Norman | 2:57 |
| 13. | "War Cry" (featuring Jean Deaux) | Baker; Amoruso; Jean Deaux; Gloria Kaba; Norman; Ramo; Yirrmal | Amoruso; Norman; Kaba | 4:02 |
| 14. | "Mustard Yellow" | Baker; Amoruso; Len20; Norman | Amoruso; Norman | 3:32 |
| Total length: | | | | 38:24 |

The deluxe edition released in August 2026, included the following three tracks. All other tracks moved down one spot.

Djandjay (Deluxe) track listing
| No. | Title | Writer(s) | Producer(s) | Length |
|---|---|---|---|---|
| 7. | "Curse" | Baker; Amoruso; Norman; Wondagurl | Amoruso; Norman; Wondagurl | 2:51 |
| 11. | "Disappear" (with BVT) | Baker; Amoruso; Norman; Bernadina Van Tiel | Amoruso; Norman | 2:56 |
| 15. | "Yolŋu Fever" | Baker; Amoruso; Farrah; Norman | Amoruso; Farrah; Norman | 2:59 |

== Personnel ==
Credits adapted from Tidal.

- Danzal Baker – vocals, didgeridoo on "Biggest Mob" and "Mad Dog"
- Andrei Eremin – mixing, mastering
- Pip Norman – engineering
- Rob Amoruso – engineering
- Pat Morrissey – engineering on "Mad Dog"
- Jacob Farah – engineering on "Menace"
- Gloria Kaba – engineering on "War Cry"

== Charts ==
Chart performance for Djandjay
| Chart (2025) | Peak position |
|---|---|
| Australian Albums (ARIA) | 13 |
| Australian Hip Hop/R&B Albums (ARIA) | 1 |
