= Better Days (Baker Boy, Dallas Woods and Sampa the Great song) =

2020 single by Baker Boy, Dallas Woods, and Sampa the Great

Single by Baker Boy and Dallas Woods featuring Sampa the Great
- Language: English; Yolngu Matha; Bemba
- Released: 23 September 2020
- Recorded: 2019
- Genre: Hip hop; neo soul
- Length: 3:21
- Label: Island Australia; Universal Australia
- Songwriters: Danzal Baker; Dallas Woods; Sampa Tembo
- Producers: Dennis Dowlut; Maxwell Bidstrup

Baker Boy singles chronology
"Move" (2020)	"Better Days" (2020)	"Ride" (2021)

Dallas Woods singles chronology
"If It Glitters It's Gold" (2020)	"Better Days" (2020)	"Heaven of My Own" (2020)

Sampa the Great singles chronology
"Time's Up" (2020)	"Better Days" (2020)	"Approach with Caution" (2020)

Music video
- Official lyric video on YouTube

"Better Days" is a song by Indigenous Australian rappers Baker Boy and Dallas Woods featuring Zambian Australian rapper Sampa the Great, released as a standalone single on 23 September 2020.

== Background and release ==
"Better Days" follows Baker's single "Move", released in March the same year. The song marks the second time Baker and Woods have collaborated, following 2018's "Black Magic", but is the first time that either Baker or Woods have collaborated with Sampa the Great.

"Better Days" was premiered on Triple J's Drive with Hobba and Hing on 22 September 2020.

== Composition and lyrics ==
Musically, "Better Days" is a hip hop, and neo soul song. The song contains lyrics in three languages: English, Yolngu Matha and Bemba.

The lyrics discuss "oppression, the pressures of meeting the expectations of your culture, and imposter syndrome [sic]."

== Promotion ==
Baker began teasing the collaboration on Instagram on 16 September, sharing a photo of the three artists together. The following day, he confirmed the artists had worked together, announcing the single on social media. Baker additionally posted videos of himself on TikTok, showing him dancing amongst various Bendigo landmarks.

== Critical reception ==
Triple J journalist Sose Fuamoli felt that the song "shows a new side of [Baker Boy's] musicality and proves that he can explore honest territory with emotional depth.

Beat Magazine's Kate Streader thought the song was "new thematic territory" for Baker and felt the song offered "an ultimately uplifting message of resilience and perseverance".

Stack Magazine's Amy Flower described the song as "piping hot" and called its release "timely".

== Track listings ==
Digital download
No.	Title	Writer(s)	Length
1.	"Better Days"	Danzal Baker; Dallas Woods; Sampa Tembo	3:21
2.	"Better Days" (Airwolf Remix)	Baker; Woods; Tembo	2:36

== In popular culture ==
- On 21 September 2020, two days prior to the song's release, the song's Airwolf remix was used to soundtrack TikTok's first local campaign in Australia.

== Credits and personnel ==
Credits adapted from Spotify.

=== Performing artists ===
- Baker Boy – vocals
- Dallas Woods – vocals
- Sampa the Great – vocals
- Airwolf – production (remix)

=== Additional personnel ===
- Dallas Woods – writing
- Danny Duque Perez – writing
- Danzal Baker – writing
- Dennis Dowlut – writing
- Kasey Heerah – writing
- Maxwell Bidstrup – writing
- Mike Scala – writing
- Sampa Tembo – writing
- Dennis Dowlut – production
- Maxwell Bidstrup – production
