= Blackprint =

Mixtape by Miss Kaninna
- Released: 21 August 2026
- Length: 18:40
- Labels: Soul Has No Tempo, AWAL
- Producers: Miss Kaninna, Lucy Blomkamp, Nikodimos

Miss Kaninna chronology
Kaninna (2024)	Blackprint (2026)

Singles from Blackprint
- 1. "Mob Ties" Released: 13 February 2026; 2. "Hand Out" Released: 16 June 2026; 3. "Stolen Wages" Released: 21 August 2026

Blackprint is the debut mixtape by Australian singer-songwriter Miss Kaninna. It was announced in June 2026 alongside singles "Hand Out". Blackprint is built around identity, self-determination, rage and joy and was released on 21 August 2026. It debuted at number 8 on the ARIA Chart.

Regarding the title, Miss Kaninna was inspired in part by Jay-Z's 2001 The Blueprint and Nicki Minaj's 2014 The Pinkprint and wanted to create her own version of the idea, one that placed Aboriginal identity at its centre. Kaninna said, "White history has demoralised and dehumanised us, and history has time again proven that the oppressor will change history depending on what suits them. I wanted the opportunity to educate people [all] over the world that Aboriginal people are the oldest living culture in the world, and we really do hold the blueprint and the blackprint."

At the 2026 ARIA Music Awards it won Best Hip Hop/Rap Release and was also nominated for Best Solo Artist and Best Independent Release.

== Reception ==
Professional ratings
Review scores
Source	Rating
The AU Review	4.5/5 stars

Sarah Duggan from The AU Review called it "a seriously strong release" saying "Miss Kaninna’s lyrics are quick, witty and sharp as hell, but underneath the punchlines is something far deeper: an enormous sense of pride in who she is." Duggan added "Her attitude and passion ooze through every track, giving the music a beating heart beneath all the swagger, wit and killer beats."

Bryget Chrisfield from Beat Magazine said "Blackprint is great party music, but it's born from resistance. [Miss Kaninna]'s all about educating people the world over on the true history of "so-called Australia", with a focus on Indigenous land rights, preserving the oldest living culture on Earth and fostering Black power."

Jimi Hargraves from Loud Women said "Blackprint is ancestral veneration as much as it is brazen confrontation. It is an impeccably produced invitation of unity sent out to all those with an ancestry that colonization has attempted to erase."

Taneshia Atkinson from MixMag called it "A 6-song project full of proper Mob anthems."

Joseph Guenzler from National Indigenous Times said "the mixtape combines heavy low-end production and rap with guitars, live instrumentation and elements drawn from punk and rock."

Sosefina Fuamoli from Rolling Stone Australia said "The Blackprint mixtape is a lesson in overcoming, achieving and embracing one's own power. It's also a lesson in letting the joy in; the Kaninna we hear on this project is a woman empowered, yes, but also a woman who is comfortable in balancing softness with the raw intensity audiences love about her."

Ben Madden from Sydney Morning Herald said "There's no room for misinterpretation on Blackprint. Across the project's six tracks, Miss Kaninna holds a mirror up to white Australia, and the double standards that permeate every part of Australian culture."

== Track listing ==
Blackprint track listing
No.	Title	Writer(s)	Length
1.	"Chat My Shit"	Kaninna Langford; A. McConnell; N. Paleologoudias	1:02
2.	"Blackprint"	Langford; A. McConnell; N. Paleologoudias	2:27
3.	"Look at Me Now" (featuring Kobie Dee)	Langford; Kobie Duncan; N. Paleologoudias	4:06
4.	"Mob Ties"	Langford; E. Parodi; V. Goodyer	3:47
5.	"Hand Out" (featuring Jamahl Yami)	Langford; J. Brodie-Chong; N. Paleologoudias	4:16
6.	"Stolen Wages"	Langford; L. Blomkamp; N. Paleologoudias	3:00
Total length:			18:40

== Charts ==
Chart performance for Blackprint
Chart (2026)	Peak position
Australian Albums (ARIA)	8
