= Thick Skin (Baker Boy song) =

2025 single by Baker Boy

Single by Baker Boy featuring Thelma Plum, Emma Donovan, Kee'Anh, and Jada Weazel

from the album Djandjay
- Released: 5 September 2025
- Length: 4:05
- Label: Danzal Baker (independent); Island; Universal
- Songwriters: Danzal Baker; Robert Amoruso; Emma Donovan; Kee'Anh Norman; Thelma Plum Jada Weazel
- Producers: Robert Amoruso; Pip Norman

Baker Boy singles chronology
"Lightning" (2025)	"Thick Skin" (2025)	"Running Low" (2025)

Thelma Plum singles chronology
"Home Among the Gumtrees" (2024)	"Thick Skin" (2025)

Emma Donovan singles chronology
"Til My Song is Done" (2024)	"Thick Skin" (2025)	"Take Me to the River" (2025)

Music video
- "Thick Skin" on YouTube

"Thick Skin" is a song by Indigenous Australian musician Baker Boy featuring a "Blak choir" of female Indigenous vocalists - Thelma Plum, Emma Donovan, Kee'Anh, and Jada Weazel, released on 5 September 2025 as the fourth single from Baker Boy's second studio album Djandjay (2025).

Upon release, Baker Boy said he wrote the song in response to the 2023 Australian Indigenous Voice referendum saying, "It wasn't anger at the result as much, I think it was the way mob became a topic of conversation and mottos like 'if you don't know vote no' encouraging ignorance. It highlighted the everyday experience of being Yolŋu, being Indigenous in this country, and that hit me hard." He continued adding "It's not natural for me to express anger through my music. I have this reputation for positivity, but I think the punk-inspired production allowed me to really say what I wanted to say. It has let me express these feelings, express the anger, the chaos and frustration in a way that's new and experimental for me, but also in a way that was really authentic; it just came out of me."

The song was performed at the 2025 AFL Grand Final in front of more than 100,000 people.

At the APRA Music Awards of 2026 the song was shortlisted for Song of the Year.

At the National Indigenous Music Awards 2026, the song won Film Clip of the Year and Song of the Year.

== Critical reception ==
Mary Varvaris from The Music (magazine) said the single "is fuelled with punk energy – surprise crunchy rock riffs alongside a furious Baker Boy – and is a celebration of Blak lives, culture and artistry, even in the darkest times."

David James Young from Music Feeds said "'Thick Skin' is sonically inspired by punk rock – which, per Baker Boy's statement, is a sound he has wanted to pursue 'for a while', saying 'This felt like the perfect track for me to let loose in that space'". The Note called the song "dynamic and powerful."

Jake Millar from GQ Australia said "The track is fuelled with punk energy, blending raw emotion with a sense of powerful resilience." Phoebe Blogg from National Indigenous Times called it "a defiant anthem of survival and solidarity."
