= Adnate =

Adnate may refer to:

- Adnation, fusion of two or more whorls of a flower in botany
- Adnate (artist) (born 1984), Australian street artist and painter who designed the cover artwork of Baker Boy's 2021 album Gela
- Adnate, classification of lamellae (gills) in mycology
- Conjoined twins
