= JK-47 =

Indigenous Australian rapper and activist

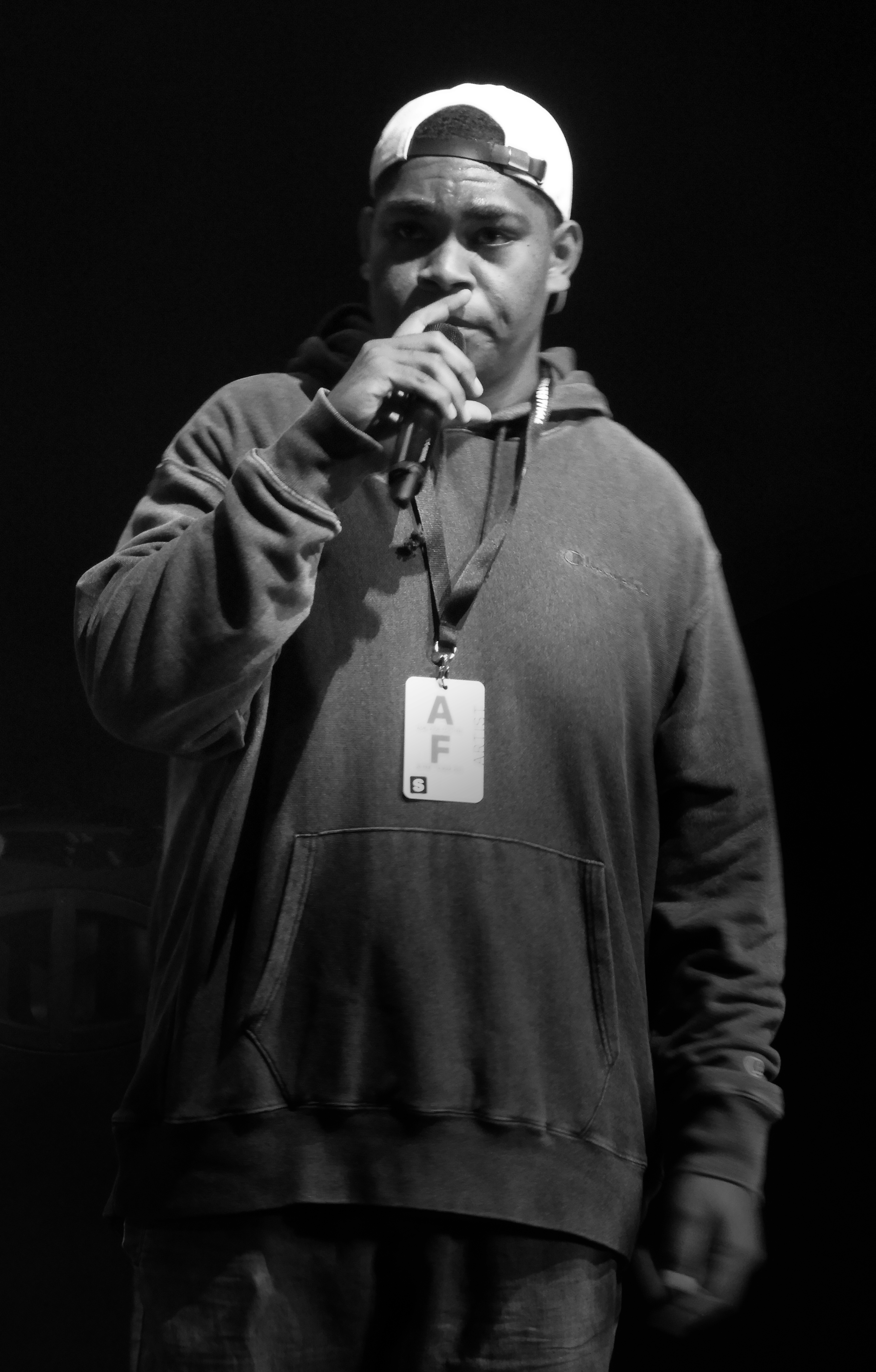
- Paulson performing at Adelaide Festival in 2021

Background information
- Born: Jacob Paulson; January 15, 1997 (age 29); Tweed Heads, New South Wales, Australia
- Origin: Tweed Heads, New South Wales, Australia
- Genres: Hip hop; Australian hip hop
- Occupations: Rapper; singer; songwriter; activist
- Instrument: Vocals
- Years active: 2012–present
- Labels: JK-47 (independent); New World Artists
- Website: linktree/jk_47

Jacob Paulson (born 15 January 1997), known professionally as JK-47, is an Indigenous Australian rapper, musician, and activist from Tweed Heads South, New South Wales.

His debut album, Made for This, was released independently on 4 September 2020.

== Early life ==
Jacob Paulson was born in Adelaide in South Australia. Paulson is a Minjungbal/Gudjinburra man of the Bundjalung community. He attended Tweed River High School for his secondary education from 2009 to 2015. He began rapping and writing music at the age of 14. In a July 2020 interview with the Tweed Valley Weekly, Paulson discussed how he came to be a rapper, stating: "I have always been into rap since I was in third or fourth grade. My brother and cousin used to rap and so I always wanted to be a rapper... I like to keep it real and I like my music to have a message."

== Career ==
=== 2019: Career beginnings and "Came for the Lot" ===
On 13 September 2019, Paulson released his debut solo single "Came for the Lot", featuring Brisbane rapper Nerve. Later that month, he featured on Nerve's single "Sunday Roast", a song credited as both artists' breakthrough. At the end of the month, Paulson was Nerve's support act at Listen Out Festival.

=== 2020–present: "The Recipe" and Made for This ===
On 22 January 2020, Paulson was announced as a support act for Adrian Eagle's Mama Tour in support of Eagle's EP of the same name. On 29 May, Paulson released the single "The Recipe". The track received frequent rotation on Triple J and saw him become a Triple J Unearthed Feature Artist on the station. On 1 July, The Music revealed in an exclusive that New World Artists had signed Paulson to their roster and additionally announced an initial August release date for his forthcoming debut album. On 3 July, Paulson released the single "I Am Here (Trust Me)", featuring Phoebe Jacobs & Hazy. The song discusses mental health and Aboriginal deaths in custody. On 8 August, Paulson performed his track "Outta Here" virtually at the 17th Annual National Indigenous Music Awards. "Outta Time" was later featured on his debut album Made for This. On 4 September, he independently released his debut album, Made for This. In January 2021, Paulson performed at Yours and Owls Festival.

On 11 February 2021, Paulson performed a cover of 2Pac's "Changes" with Bronte Eve for Triple J's Like a Version segment, alongside a performance of "The Recipe" as his original track. In March, Paulson performed at the Adelaide Festival's hip hop finale concert. The event had an all-indigenous line-up, featuring Jimblah, Ziggy Ramo and J-Milla. On 1 July, Australian record company Waxx Lyrical announced Made for This as their "Record of the Month". Following the announcement, the company reissued the album on vinyl for a limited run of 150 copies.

In August 2022, Paulson released "At One (reVision)" and announced the forthcoming release of his second studio album, Revision for Regrowth.

== Personal life ==
Paulson's partner Lauren gave birth to their son, Zuriel, in June 2020.

== Musical style and influences ==
Paulson is primarily a hip hop and Australian hip hop artist. His music frequently discusses issues facing Indigenous Australians.

Paulson's track "The Recipe" has been favourably compared to late American rapper Nipsey Hussle, an artist whom he considers an influence. He also lists J. Cole, Kendrick Lamar, the Game, Joey Bada$$, and Lauryn Hill as musical influences.

== Discography ==
=== Studio albums ===
List of studio albums, release date, label, and selected chart positions shown
Title	Album details	Peak chart positions
Title	Album details	AUS
Made for This	Released: 4 September 2020; Label: JK-47 (independent); Formats: LP (Limited release of 150 copies), Digital download, streaming	— (Note: Made for This did not enter the ARIA Albums Chart, but did peak at number 4 on the ARIA Australian Hip Hop/R&B Albums Album Chart.)
Revision for Regrowth (with Jay Orient)	Released: 3 November 2023; Label: JK-47 (independent); Formats: Digital download, streaming	—
A Road Less Travelled	Released: TBA; Label: JK-47 (independent); Formats: Digital download, streaming	TBA

=== Singles ===
==== As lead artist ====
List of singles, with year released and album name shown
Title	Year	Album
"Came for the Lot" (featuring Nerve)	2019	Non-album single
"The Recipe"	2020	Made for This
"I Am Here (Trust Me)" (featuring Phoebe Jacobs and Hazy)	2020	Made for This
"Guess Again" (featuring Dredub)	2021	Made for This
"Healing" (with Jay Orient)	2021	
"Kentucky, We Fight (Flood Won't Last)" (Devine Carama & JK-47 featuring Bryce Jamel)	2022	
"At One (reVision)"	2022	Revision for Regrowth
"Rain" (with Jay Orient featuring Adrian Eagle)	2023	Revision for Regrowth
"Avalanche" (featuring Tasman Keith)	2023	Revision for Regrowth
"God Timing"	2024	A Road Less Travelled
"Blkt Out" (featuring Mattymadeit)	2024	A Road Less Travelled
"A Road Less Travelled"	2024	A Road Less Travelled

==== As featured artist ====
List of singles, with year released and album name shown
Title	Year	Album
"Up Again" (Gratis Minds featuring JK-47)	2018	Non-album singles
"No1 Knows the Lyrics" (No1network featuring Nerve, Smak, Chiggz, Nate G, and JK-47)	2019	Non-album singles
"Sunday Roast" (Nerve featuring JK-47)	2019	Mumma's Boy
"Land" (Hazy featuring Narli and JK-47)	2020	Non-album single
"One in a Million" (Nerve featuring JK-47)	2021	Tall Poppy Season

=== Promotional singles ===
List of promotional singles, with year released and album name shown
Title	Year	Album
"Changes (Like A Version)" (featuring Bronte Eve)	2021	Non-album single

== Awards and nominations ==
=== AIR Awards ===
The Australian Independent Record Awards (commonly known informally as AIR Awards) is an annual awards night to recognise, promote and celebrate the success of Australia's Independent Music sector.

Year	Nominee / work	Award	Result	Ref.
2024	Revision for Regrowth	Best Independent Hip Hop Album or EP	Nominated	

=== ARIA Music Awards ===
The ARIA Music Awards are a set of annual ceremonies presented by Australian Recording Industry Association (ARIA), which recognise excellence, innovation, and achievement across all genres of the music of Australia. They commenced in 1987.

Year	Nominee / work	Award	Result	Ref.
2024	JK-47 Cancer Council: End the Trend (Bolster Group)	Best Use of an Australian Recording in an Advertisement	Won	

=== Gold Coast Music Awards ===
Year	Nominee / work	Award	Result (win only)	Ref.
2024	"Lullaby"	Song of the Year	Won	

=== J Awards ===
The J Awards are an annual series of Australian music awards that were established by the Australian Broadcasting Corporation's youth-focused radio station Triple J. They commenced in 2005.

Year	Nominee / work	Award	Result	Ref.
2020	Made for This	Australian Album of the Year	Nominated	
2020	Himself	Unearthed Artist of the Year	Won	

=== National Indigenous Music Awards ===
The National Indigenous Music Awards (NIMAs) recognise excellence, dedication, innovation and outstanding contribution to the Northern Territory music industry. In 2020, Paulson was nominated for one award, which he won.

Year	Nominee / work	Award	Result	Ref.
2020	Himself	Triple J Unearthed National Indigenous Competition	Won	
2021	Made for This	Album of the Year	Won	

=== Rolling Stone Australia Awards ===
The Rolling Stone Australia Awards are awarded annually in January or February by the Australian edition of Rolling Stone magazine for outstanding contributions to popular culture in the previous year.

Year	Nominee / work	Award	Result	Ref.
2021	JK-47	Best New Artist	Nominated	

== Concert tours ==
=== Supporting ===
- Mama Tour – Adrian Eagle (2020)
