= Kaninna =

EP by Miss Kaninna
- Released: 20 September 2024
- Length: 17:20
- Label: Soul Has No Tempo
- Producers: YAOB, Finn Rees, Jack McLaine

Miss Kaninna chronology
Kaninna (2024)	Blackprint (2026)

Singles from Kaninna
- 1. "Blak Britney" Released: 5 May 2023; 2. "Pinnacle Bitch" Released: 20 October 2023; 3. "Push Up" Released: 28 June 2024; 4. "Dawg in Me" Released: 14 August 2024

Kaninna is the debut extended play by Australian Miss Kaninna.

Regarding the title, Miss Kaninna said "I had other names circling in my head but none of them really felt right. This being my first body of work as an artist I wanted to name it something I can be proud of and look back at in years time and still feel a connection to it. That's when I realised it had to be my name."

At the AIR Awards of 2025, the EP won Best Independent Hip Hop Album or EP and Independent Mix, Studio or Mastering Engineer of the Year for work by Nick Herrera.

At the 2025 ARIA Music Awards, the album was nominated for Best Hip Hop Release and Best Independent Release.

== Reception ==
Conor Lochrie from Rolling Stone Australia said "The EP reflects the music Miss Kaninna grew up listening to and loving, from hip-hop to rap, R&B to pop, with flourishes of Afrobeats, Amapiano, and more global musical influences thrown in for good measure."

Tyler Jenkie from The Music said "Anyone who listens to the Kaninna EP will certainly see the scope of Miss Kaninna's artistry. Among the previously-released singles, there's also some more sonic left-turns by the way of the infectiously-bouncy 'Kush', or the Middle Eastern-influenced 'Friends'. Working with producer Jacob Farah (a.k.a. YAOB), she's managed to set herself up as a musician unafraid to try new things, open to adopting new approaches, and simply eager to try and create something entirely singular."

Ky Stewart from Junkee said "In just one debut EP, Miss Kaninna showcases her incredible vocal ability, skilled songwriting, and just how good she is at spitting bars."

== Track listing ==
Kaninna track listing
No.	Title	Writer(s)	Length
1.	"Blak Britney"	Kaninna Langford; Jack McLaine; Finn Rees	2:54
2.	"Dawg in Me"	Langford; Jacob Farah	2:29
3.	"Friends"	Langford; Jacob Farah; Jerome Farah	3:30
4.	"Push Up"	Langford; Jacob Farah	3:18
5.	"Kush"	Langford; Jacob Farah	2:07
6.	"Pinnacle Bitch"	Langford; Jacob Farah; Rees	3:21
Total length:			17:20

== Charts ==
Chart performance for Kaninna
Chart (2024)	Peak position
Australian Artist Hip Hop / R&B Albums (ARIA)	5
