= Baker Boy =

Indigenous Australian rapper, dancer, and artist (born 1996)

Baker Boy OAM
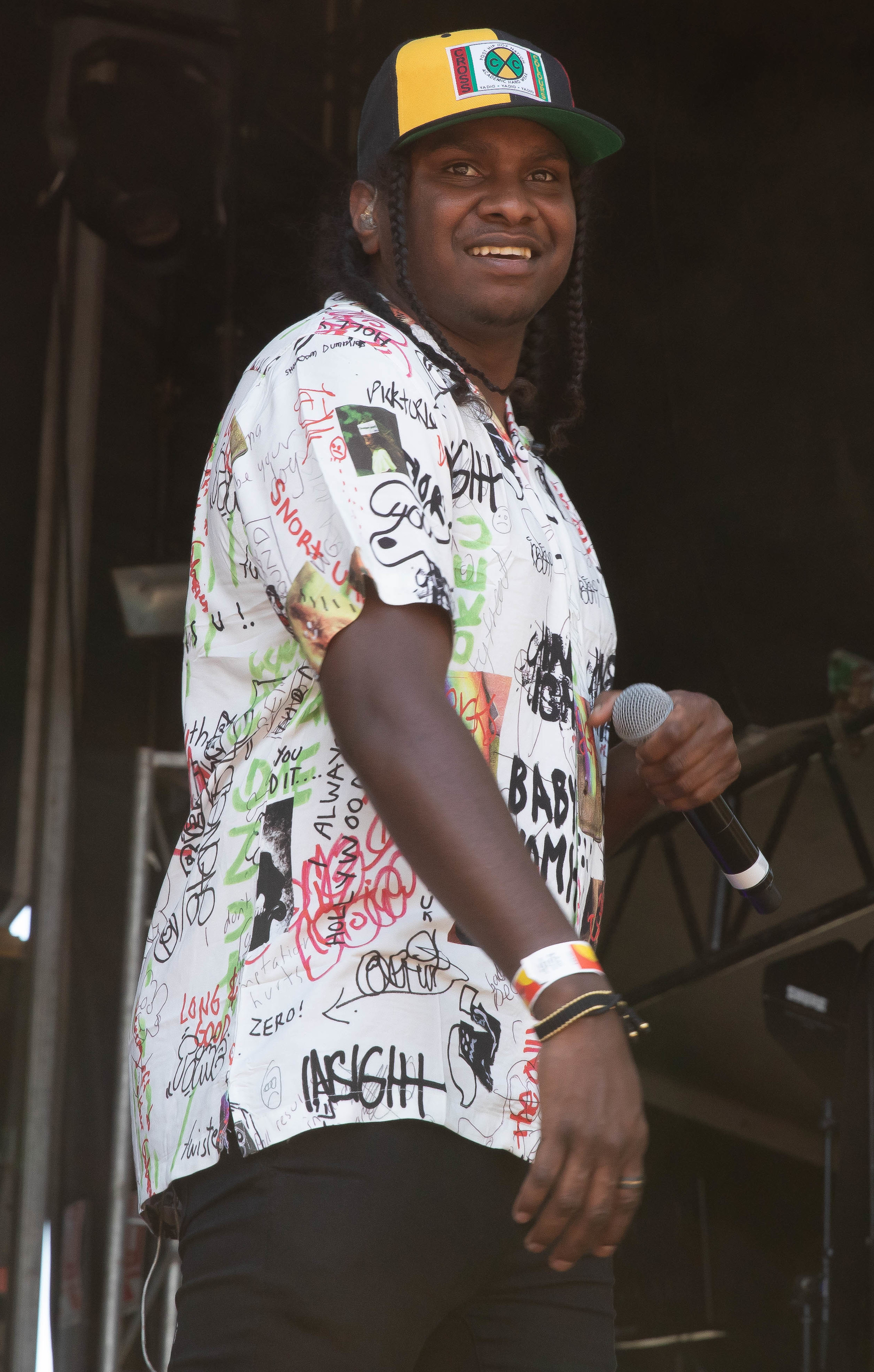
- Baker Boy performing at Laneway in 2019

Background information
- Born: Danzal James Baker; 10 October 1996 (age 30); Darwin, Northern Territory, Australia
- Origin: Milingimbi Island, Arnhem Land, Northern Territory, Australia
- Genres: Australian hip hop; R&B; soul
- Occupations: Rapper; dancer; artist
- Instruments: Vocals; yidaki
- Years active: 2017–present
- Labels: Universal Music Australia; Island Records Australia
- Website: www.bakerboyofficial.com

Danzal James Baker OAM (born 10 October 1996), known professionally as Baker Boy, is a Yolngu rapper, dancer, and artist. Baker Boy is known for performing original hip-hop songs incorporating both English and Yolŋu Matha and is one of the most prominent Aboriginal Australian rappers.

He was made Young Australian of the Year in 2019, and his song "Cool as Hell" was nominated in several categories in the 2019 ARIA Awards. In 2018, he won two awards at the National Indigenous Music Awards, and was named Male Artist of the Year in the National Dreamtime Awards. His debut album, Gela, was released on 15 October 2021 with the songs Cool as Hell and Meditjin. At the 2022 ARIA Music Awards he won five categories from seven nominations.

== Early life ==
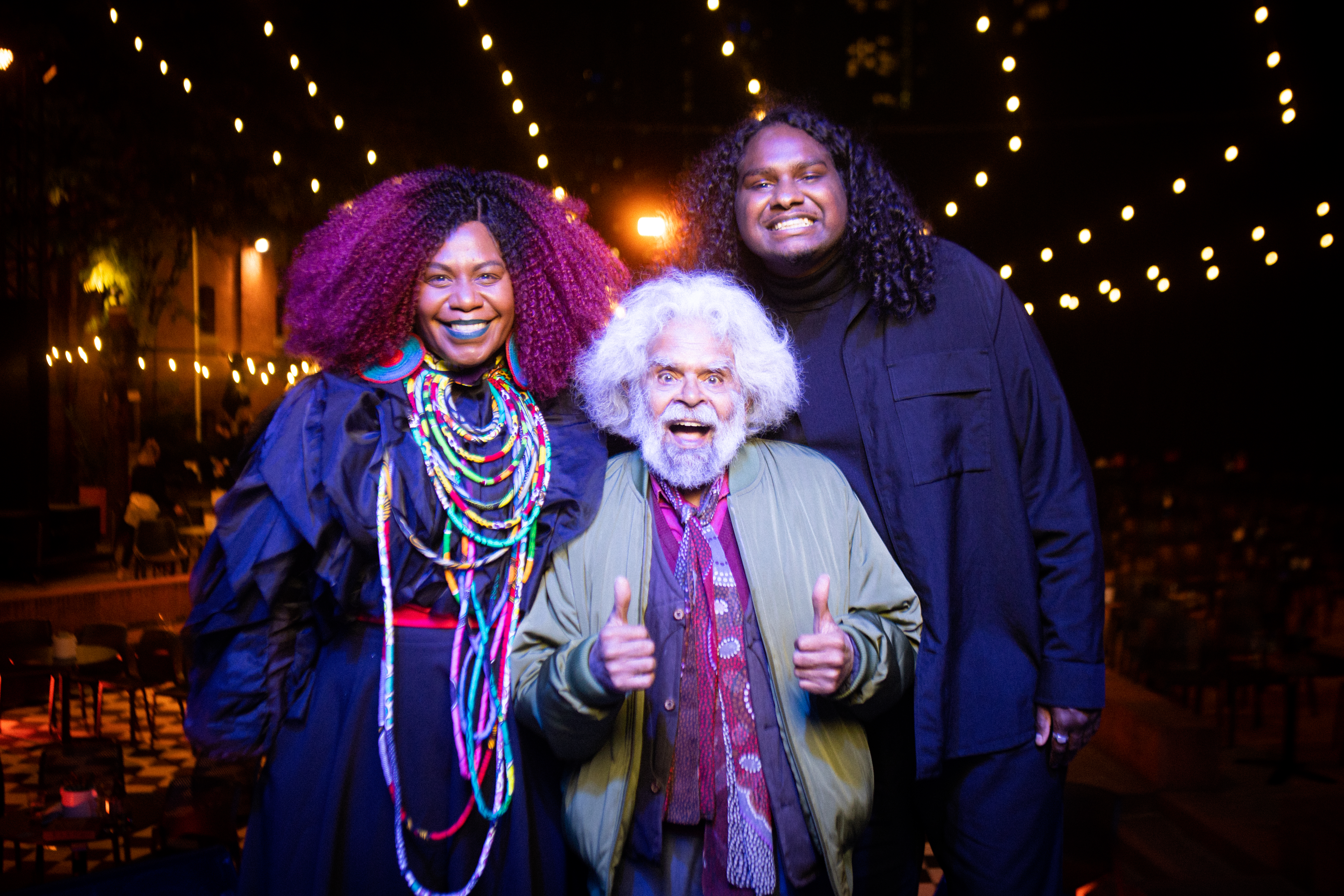
Namila Benson, Jack Charles and Baker Boy at the 'Night With Uncle Jack' event at the Malthouse Theatre, Melbourne, November 2021

Danzal James Baker was born on 10 October 1996 in Darwin, Northern Territory, and grew up in the Arnhem Land communities of Milingimbi and Maningrida. He has one brother. His totem is the Olive python, his moiety is Dhuwa and his skin name is Burralung / Gela boy.

He completed Year 12 at Shalom Christian College in Townsville, Queensland, before attending the Aboriginal Centre for the Performing Arts in Brisbane. He developed his love of dancing and acting there, and was an original member of the Djuki Mala dance troupe, which toured Australia.

In 2016, Baker Boy featured in the video for "Yolngu Style", a modern contemporary dance music video created by a group of artists to inspire the world to dance, move and absorb the Yolngu style. That same year, Baker appeared on the "Indigenous" episode of the first series of Australian television series You Can't Ask That on ABC TV.

== Career ==
=== 2017–2019: Career beginnings ===
In 2017, Baker Boy attracted national attention as the winner of the Triple J Unearthed National Indigenous Music Awards (NIMAs) Competition. releasing the singles "Cloud 9" featuring Kian and "Marryuna" featuring Yirrmal in the same year. Both singles were featured in Triple J's Hottest 100 of 2017.

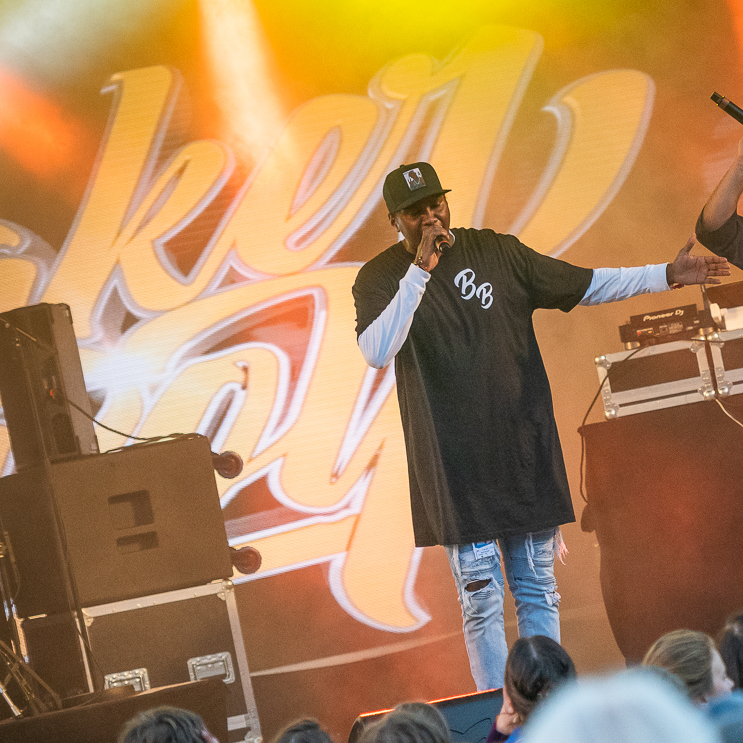
Baker Boy performing at the Riddu Riđđu Festival in Norway, 2018.

In 2018, he performed with acts such as Yothu Yindi and Dizzee Rascal.

He performed as an opening act for American rapper 50 Cent in January 2018, along with A.B. Original.

His third single, "Mr. La Di Da Di" was released in April 2018. "Black Magic" featuring Dallas Woods, was released in July 2018.

The Yolngu rapper also performed at the Riddu Riđđu Festival in Norway in 2018, his first international performance outside of Australia.

On 25 January 2019, Baker released "Cool as Hell" Two days later, "Mr. La Di Da Di" was voted into Triple J's Hottest 100 of 2018.

In June 2019, Baker released "In Control". On 7 July, Baker Boy appeared on the children's television show, Play School, and performed "Hickory Dickory Dock" as part of NAIDOC Week.

Baker Boy was the headline act at the opening night of the 2019 Tarnanthi exhibition of Aboriginal and Torres Strait Islander art at the Art Gallery of South Australia on 17 October 2019, performing outside the Gallery on North Terrace, Adelaide.

Baker made his acting debut in True History of the Kelly Gang, released in cinemas in early January 2019 and later released on streaming service provider Stan from 26 January.

=== 2020–2023: Gela ===
During the COVID-19 pandemic, Baker spent time in the studio finishing off Gela. The time allowed him to focus and take things slow rather than the usual busy back-to-back shows and then straight into the studio schedule.

On 16 September 2020, Baker began teasing a new song on social media, posting images of himself alongside Dallas Woods and Sampa the Great. On 23 September 2020, Baker released the single "Better Days".

On 25 September 2021, Baker Boy performed as part of the pre-match entertainment at the 2021 AFL Grand Final at Perth Stadium.

On 15 October 2021, he released his debut studio album Gela, on which he is accompanied by Glen Gurruwiwi's vocals and Kevin Gurruwiwi playing yidaki on the track "Announcing the Journey".

Baker has performed in televised advertisements for Menulog and for Google.

Baker performed at the closing ceremony of the 2022 Commonwealth Games in Birmingham, as part of the handover to the Australian hosts of Victoria 2026.

=== 2024–2025: Djandjay ===
In August 2024, Baker released the stand-along single "King".

In July 2025, Baker announced the forthcoming release of his second studio album, Djandjay.

In September 2025, Baker Boy released the punk-inspired single "Thick Skin", featuring a "Blak choir" of Thelma Plum, Emma Donovan, Kee'Anh and Jada Weazel. He performed in the pre-match entertainment at the 2025 AFL grand final as well as accompanying Snoop Dogg on didgeridoo.

== Personal life ==
As of 2020 Baker was residing in Bendigo, Victoria, with his partner Aurie Spencer-Gill and his bulldog.

He has said that he wants to be an inspiration to Indigenous kids living in remote communities, and to combat "shame."

A portrait of Baker, titled Rhythms of heritage, by Matt Adnate won the 2024 Packing Room Prize at the Archibald Prize awards.

== Discography ==
=== Studio albums ===
List of studio albums, with release date and label shown
Title	Album details	Peak chart positions
Title	Album details	AUS
Gela	Released: 15 October 2021; Label: Island Australia, Universal Music Australia; Formats: CD, LP, digital download, streaming	3
Djandjay	Released: 10 October 2025; Label: Island Australia, Universal Music Australia; Formats: CD, LP, digital download, streaming	13

=== Singles ===
==== As lead artist ====
List of singles, with year released, selected certifications and album name shown
Title	Year	Certifications	Album
"Cloud 9" (featuring Kian)	2017		Non-album singles
"Marryuna" (featuring Yirrmal)	2017		Non-album singles
"Mr. La Di Da Di"	2018	ARIA: Gold	Non-album singles
"Black Magic" (featuring Dallas Woods)	2018		Non-album singles
"Cool as Hell"	2019	ARIA: Platinum	Gela
"In Control"	2019		Non-album single
"Meditjin" (featuring JessB)	2019		Gela
"Move"	2020		Gela
"Better Days" (with Dallas Woods featuring Sampa the Great)	2020		Non-album single
"Ride" (featuring Yirrmal)	2021		Gela
"My Mind" (featuring G Flip)	2021		Gela
"Butterflies"	2021		Gela
"Survive" (featuring Uncle Jack Charles)	2021		Gela
"Wish You Well" (featuring Bernard Fanning)	2022		Non-album single
"King"	2024		Non-album single
"Peacekeeper"	2025		Djandjay
"Freak Out" (with Briggs and Haiku Hands)	2025		Djandjay
"Lightning" (featuring Redd.)	2025		Djandjay
"Thick Skin" (with Thelma Plum, Emma Donovan, Kee'Anh and Jada Weazel)	2025		Djandjay
"Running Low" (with Pardyalone)	2025		Djandjay
"Jump" (Like a Version)	2026		Non-album singles
"Let's Go"	2026		Non-album singles
"Curse"	2026		Djandjay (deluxe)
"Yolŋu Fever"	2026		Djandjay (deluxe)

==== As featured artist ====
List of singles, with year released and album shown
Title	Year	Album
"Treaty '18" (Yothu Yindi & Gavin Campbell featuring Baker Boy)	2018	Non-album single
"Take Me to the Beach" (Imagine Dragons featuring Baker Boy)	2024	Non-album single

== Filmography ==
List of film and television appearances, with year released and role shown
Year	Title	Role	Notes	Ref.
2018	The Nightingale	Captured man 1	Uncredited	
2019	True History of the Kelly Gang	Uncredited		
2019	Play School	Himself	Performed "Hickory Dickory Dock"	

== Awards and nominations ==
In 2019, Baker Boy was awarded Young Australian of the Year. He delivered his acceptance speech in both English and Yolngu Matha.

At the 2021 Australia Day Honours, Baker was awarded the Medal of the Order of Australia (OAM) for service to the performing arts as a singer and musician.

=== AIR Awards ===
The Australian Independent Record Awards (known informally as the AIR Awards) is an annual awards night to recognise, promote and celebrate the success of Australia's Independent Music sector.

Year	Nominee / work	Award	Result	Ref.
2018	Himself	Best Independent Artist	Nominated	
2018	"Marryuna"	Best Independent Single or EP	Nominated	
2018	Himself	Breakthrough Independent Artist	Won	

=== APRA Awards ===
The APRA Awards are held in Australia and New Zealand by the Australasian Performing Right Association to recognise songwriting skills, sales and airplay performance by its members annually.

Year	Nominee / work	Award	Result	Ref.
2019	"Marryuna" (Danzal Baker, Dion Brownfield, Jerome Farah, Yirrmal Marika)	Song of the Year	Shortlisted	
2019	"Marryuna" (Danzal Baker, Dion Brownfield, Jerome Farah, Yirrmal Marika)	Urban Work of the Year	Nominated	
2019	"Mr La Di Da Di" (Danzal Baker, Dion Brownfield, Jerome Farah, Dallas Woods)	Urban Work of the Year	Nominated	
2019	Danzal Baker p.k.a. Baker Boy	Breakthrough Songwriter of the Year	Nominated	
2020	"Cool as Hell" (Danzal Baker, Carl Dimataga, Jesse Ferris, Morgan Jones, Brendan Tuckerman, Dallas Woods)	Most Performed Urban Work of the Year	Nominated	
2021	"Meditjin" - Baker Boy featuring JessB (Danzal Baker, Jess Bourke, Dion Brownfield, Jerome Farah, Dallas Woods)	Song of the Year	Shortlisted	
2022	"Ride" (Danzal Baker, Yirrmal Marika, Philip Norman, Dallas Woods)	Song of the Year	Shortlisted	
2023	"Headphones" (featuring Lara Andallo)	Song of the Year	Shortlisted	
2023	"Wish You Well (featuring Bernard Fanning) (Danzal Baker, Bernard Fanning, Pip Norman)	Song of the Year	Shortlisted	
2023	"Wish You Well (featuring Bernard Fanning) (Danzal Baker, Bernard Fanning, Pip Norman)	Most Performed Hip Hop/ Rap Work of the Year	Nominated	
2025	"Won't Stop" (3% featuring Jessica Mauboy) (Danzal Baker, Andrew Burford, Madeline Crabtree, Corey Webster, Dallas Woods)	Song of the Year	Shortlisted	
2026	"Thick Skin" (featuring Thelma Plum, Emma Donovan, Kee'ahn & Jada Weazel) (Danzal Baker, Rob Amoruso, Kee’ahn Bindol, Emma Donovan, Thelma Plum, Pip Norman, Jada Weazel)	Song of the Year	Shortlisted	

=== ARIA Music Awards ===
The ARIA Music Awards is an annual award ceremony event celebrating the Australian music industry. At the ARIA Music Awards of 2019, Baker Boy was nominated for three categories, and received three more nominations in 2020. He headed the leader board in 2022 with five wins from seven nominations.

Year	Nominee / work	Award	Result	Ref.
2019	"Cool as Hell"	Best Hip Hop Release	Nominated	
2019	"Cool as Hell"	Best Video	Nominated	
2019	Cool as Hell Tour	Best Australian Live Act	Nominated	
2020	"Meditjin" (featuring JessB)	Best Hip Hop Release	Nominated	
2020	"Meditjin" (featuring JessB)	Best Video	Nominated	
2020	Falls Festival	Best Australian Live Act	Nominated	
2022	Gela	Album of the Year	Won	
2022	Gela	Best Solo Artist	Won	
2022	Gela	Best Hip Hop / Rap Release	Won	
2022	Macario De Souza for "Wish You Well" Baker Boy (featuring Bernard Fanning)	Best Video	Nominated	
2022	Gela Tour	Best Live Act	Nominated	
2022	Adnate for Baker Boy Gela	Best Cover Art	Won	
2022	Pip Norman, Andrei Eremin, Dave Hammer for Baker Boy – Gela	Mix Engineer – Best Mixed Album	Won	
2023	Google: Helping You Help Others (72andSunn)	Best Use of an Australian Recording in an Advertisement (duration of 2 minutes or less)	Won	
2023	Regional Vic Tour	Best Australian Live Act	Nominated	
2026	Djandjay	Best Solo Artist	Nominated	
2026	Djandjay	Best Hip Hop / Rap Release	Nominated	
2026	Djandjay	Best Cover Art	Nominated	
2026	Aurie Indianna and Jordan Ruyi Blanch for Baker Boy – "Running Low" (featuring Pardyalone)	Best Video	Nominated	
2026	Djandjay Tour	Best Australian Live Act	Nominated	

=== Australian Music Prize ===
The Australian Music Prize (the AMP) is an annual award of $30,000 given to an Australian band or solo artist in recognition of the merit of an album released during the year of award. It commenced in 2005.

Year	Nominee / work	Award	Result
2021	Gala	Australian Music Prize	Nominated
2026	Djandjay	Australian Music Prize	Nominated

=== J Awards ===
The J Awards are an annual series of Australian music awards that were established by the Australian Broadcasting Corporation's youth-focused radio station Triple J. They commenced in 2005.

Year	Nominee / work	Award	Result	Ref.
2017	Himself	Unearthed Artist of the Year	Nominated	
2021	Gela	Australian Album of the Year	Nominated	
2025	Djandjay	Australian Album of the Year	Nominated	

=== MTV Europe Music Awards ===
The MTV Europe Music Awards is an award presented by Viacom International Media Networks to honour artists and music in pop culture.

Year	Nominee / work	Award	Result	Ref.
2020	Himself	Best Australian Act	Nominated	

=== Music Victoria Awards ===
The Music Victoria Awards, are an annual awards night celebrating Victorian music. The commenced in 2005.

Year	Nominee / work	Award	Result	Ref.
2018	Himself	Best Solo Act	Nominated	
2018	Himself	Best Male Musician	Won	
2018	Himself	Best Live Act	Won	
2018	Himself	Best Hip Hop Act	Nominated	
2018	Himself	Victorian Breakthrough Act	Won	
2018	Himself	Archie Roach Award for Emerging Talent	Nominated	
2018	"Marryuna"	Best Song	Won	
2019	Himself	Best Solo Act	Nominated	
2020	"Move"	Best Victorian Song	Nominated	
2020	Himself	Best Solo Artist	Nominated	
2021	Himself	Best Regional/Outer Suburban Act	Won	
2021	Himself	Best Solo Act	Nominated	
2022	Gela	Best Victorian Album	Won	
2022	"Survive"	Best Victorian Song	Won	
2022	Himself	Best Solo Artist	Nominated	
2022	Himself	Best Regional Act	Won	

=== National Dreamtime Awards ===
The National Dreamtime Awards, (also known as The Dreamtime Awards), are an annual celebration of Australian Aboriginal and Torres Strait Islander achievement in sport, arts, academic and community.

Year	Nominee / work	Award	Result	Ref.
2018	Himself	Male Artist of the Year	Won	

=== National Indigenous Music Awards ===
The National Indigenous Music Awards is an annual awards ceremony that recognises the achievements of Indigenous Australians in music.

Year	Nominee / work	Award	Result	Ref.
2018	Himself	Best New Talent	Won	
2018	"Marryuna"	Film Clip of the Year	Won	
2018	"Marryuna"	Song of the Year	Nominated	
2019	Himself	Artist of the Year	Won	
2019	"Black Magic"	Song of the Year	Nominated	
2020	Himself	Artist of the Year	Won	
2020	"Meditjin" (featuring JessB)	Film Clip of the Year	Won	
2020	"Meditjin" (featuring JessB)	Song of the Year	Won	
2021	Himself	Artist of the Year	Nominated	
2021	"Better Days" (with Dallas Woods & Sampa the Great)	Song of the Year	Nominated	
2021	"Ride" (featuring Yirrmal)	Film Clip of the Year	Won	
2022	Himself	Artist of the Year	Won	
2022	Gela	Album of the Year	Won	
2022	"My Mind"	Film Clip of the Year	Nominated	
2026	Baker Boy	Artist of the Year	Nominated	
2026	Djandjay	Album of the Year	Won	
2026	"Thick Skin" (featuring Thelma Plum, Emma Donovan, Kee'Ahn & Jada Weazel)	Song of the Year	Won	
2026	"Thick Skin" (featuring Thelma Plum, Emma Donovan, Kee'Ahn & Jada Weazel)	Film Clip of the Year	Won	

=== National Live Music Awards ===
The National Live Music Awards (NLMAs) commenced in 2016 to recognise contributions to the live music industry in Australia.

Year	Nominee / work	Award	Result	Ref.
2018	Himself	Live Act of the Year	Won	
2018	Himself	Best New Act	Nominated	
2018	Himself	Live Hip Hop Act of the Year	Won	
2018	Himself	Northern Territory Live Act of the Year	Won	
2019	Himself	Live Hip Hop Act of the Year	Nominated	
2019	Himself	Northern Territory Live Act of the Year	Won	
2023	Baker Boy	Musicians Making a Difference	Won	
2023	Baker Boy	Best Hip Hop Act	Nominated	

=== Rolling Stone Australia Awards ===
The Rolling Stone Australia Awards are awarded annually in January or February by the Australian edition of Rolling Stone magazine for outstanding contributions to popular culture in the previous year.

Year	Nominee / work	Award	Result	Ref.
2021	"Meditjin"	Best Single	Nominated	
2022	Gela	Best Record	Nominated	
2025	"King"	Best Single	Shortlisted	

=== Vanda & Young Global Songwriting Competition ===
The Vanda & Young Global Songwriting Competition is an annual competition that "acknowledges great songwriting whilst supporting and raising money for Nordoff-Robbins" and is coordinated by Albert Music and APRA AMCOS. It commenced in 2009.

Year	Nominee / work	Award	Result	Ref.
2020	"Meditjin"	Vanda & Young Global Songwriting Competition	2nd	
2025	"Freak Out"	Vanda & Young Global Songwriting Competition	Finalist	
