= Meditjin =

2019 single by Baker Boy featuring JessB

Single by Baker Boy featuring JessB

from the album Gela
- Released: 21 November 2019
- Length: 2:58
- Label: Danzal Baker (independent); Island; Universal
- Songwriters: Jerome Farah; Dallas Woods; Danzal Baker; Dion Brownfield; Jessica Bourke
- Producer: Jerome Farah

Baker Boy singles chronology
"In Control" (2019)	"Meditjin" (2019)	"Move" (2020)

Music video
- "Meditjin" on YouTube

"Meditjin" (English: "Medicine") is a song by Indigenous Australian musician Baker Boy featuring Indigenous New Zealand rapper JessB, released on 21 November 2019 as the second single from his debut album Gela (2021). The song and music video of "Meditjin" received or were nominated for a number of awards, and the song was used in an advertisement for the 2020 AFL season.

== Background and production ==
Baker Boy said "Music is the best meditjin (medicine). It brings everyone together, makes you want to dance, love, laugh, vibe and feel and I wrote 'Meditjin' with just that in mind. It's about making people feel the music and expressing themselves."

The song features Indigenous New Zealand rapper JessB.

== Music video ==
The music video was released on 4 December 2019, and was directed by Gabriel Gasparinatos.

=== Synopsis ===
The video features Baker Boy rapping in his native language of Yolngu Matha as well as English, alongside six barefoot Dancehall Dancers and two members of the Baker Boy family. Baker Boy said: "The video for "Meditjin" was such an exciting process to work through, the concept blew my mind, so I was just so pumped we managed to pull all the elements together. The small things in this video make me so excited, like having my brother, Adam, and cousin, Tristan in the clip. It wasn't really planned but the timing worked out, so it was like 'why not', they were so excited too!"

== Release and reception ==
"Meditjin" was released on 21 November 2019 as the second single from Baker Boy's debut album Gela (2021).

Christopher Brown from With Guitars said "'Meditjin' is drenched in positive vibes and brings the raw energy of early singles such as "Marryuna", as well as the sound of the Yidaki (aka Didgeridoo) – an instrument that originated with the Yolngu and Galpu people of North East Arnhem Land."

== Recognition, awards and nominations ==
The song was used in an advertisement for the 2020 AFL season.

"Meditjin" was the recipient of various awards, including Film Clip of the Year and Song of the Year at the 2020 National Indigenous Music Awards and second place in the 2021 Vanda & Young Global Songwriting Competition.

The music video, directed by Gabriel Gasparinatos, was nominated for Best Video at the ARIA Music Awards of 2020.

At the APRA Music Awards of 2021, the song was shortlisted for Song of the Year.

== Chart performance ==
The song peaked at number 1 on the National Indigenous Music Chart.
