= Stuart Joel Nuggett =

Australian country musician

Stuart Joel Nuggett Kirriyangunji
- Born: Elliott (Kulumindini), Northern Territory, Australia
- Genres: Country
- Instrument(s): Vocals, guitar
- Labels: CAAMA Music

Stuart Joel Nuggett (Kirriyangunji) is a Jingili country musician based in Alice Springs, Australia. He speaks Mudbura and Jingulu languages.

== Career ==
Originally from Elliott (Kulumindini), Northern Territory, Nugget was front man for the rock band, Storm Riders. The band also included Samuel Sandy and Jason Bill of Kulumindini Band, with Farryl Jones, Terrance Cooper, and Clifford Campbell. In 2002 Storm Riders released a five-track extended play (EP), Waiting on a Miracle, and played 2014's Merrepen Festival.

Nuggett was taught Jingulu by his mother Janet Sandy-Gregory who was one of four fluent speakers of the language. In 2019 he released Stuart Nuggett, a five-track EP, featuring music in the Jingulu language on CAAMA Music. It was performed at the First Nations Media Awards and National Live Music Awards. His song "Nayurni" (woman) was nominated for the Indigenous Language Award of the Year award at the National Indigenous Music Awards (NIMAs).

Following the release of his EP, Nuggett was signed to CAAMA Music, which released his debut album Ngaaya-Ma Jingila Baaya in October 2020. The album is in both Jingulu and English, and two of its tracks were nominated for the NIMAs in 2021.

In 2019 Nuggett was one of several First Nations people who protested Origin Energy's fracking the Betaloo Basin area. He highlighted concerns over a lack of information over effects to the environment.

His music forms part of the Jingili Song Project, which is supported by Darwin Musician David Garnham.

Nuggett has performed at Port Fairy Folk Festival and the National Folk Festival in 2025.

== Awards and nominations ==
=== National Indigenous Music Awards ===
Year	Award	Nominee / work	Award	Result
2024	NT Song of the Year Awards	Ilbilgini Agiyabarda (When the Water Goes Down) with David Garnham and Janet Gregory	Blues and Roots	Nominated
2020	National Indigenous Music Awards	Nayurni (woman)	Indigenous Language Award of the Year	Nominated
2021	National Indigenous Music Awards	I Am That Man/Ngaaya-Baaya	Indigenous Language Award of the Year	Nominated
2021	National Indigenous Music Awards	Monsoon/Kuyubulu	Indigenous Language Award of the Year	Nominated
