= JessB =

New Zealand rapper

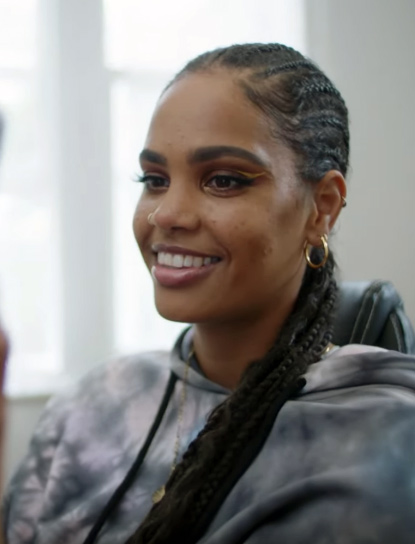
- Jess Bourke (2021)

Background information
- Born: Jess Bourke
- Genre: Hip hop
- Occupations: Rapper and former professional netballer

Jess Bourke, better known as JessB, is a rapper and former professional netballer from Auckland, New Zealand. She has released two EPs (Bloom and New Views) and won Best New Zealand Act at the 2019 MTV Europe Music Awards. JessB's debut studio album is scheduled for release in July 2024.

== Early life and netball career ==
Bourke is of Kenyan descent and was adopted by New Zealand parents. After high school, she joined Central Pulse of the ANZ Championship netball league. She also played for the Northern Mystics.

== Discography ==
=== Studio albums ===
List of studio album, with release date and label details shown
Title	Detailsn
Feels Like Home	Released: 5 July 2024; Label: SayLess, Warner; Formats: Digital download, streaming
Matters of the Heart	Released: 11 September 2026; Label: Bullseye; Formats: Digital download, streaming

=== Mixtapes ===
List of mixtapes, with release date and label details shown
Title	Details
3 Nights in Amsterdam	Released: 28 August 2020; Label: The Orchard; Formats: Digital download, streaming

=== Extended plays ===
List of extended plays, with release date and label shown
Title	Details
Bloom	Released: 16 March 2018; Label: Self-released; Formats: Digital download, streaming
New Views	Released: 9 August 2019; Label: Self-released; Formats: Digital download, streaming

=== Singles ===
==== As lead artist ====
List of singles as lead artist, with year released and album shown
Title	Year	Peak chart positions	Album
Title	Year	NZ Hot	Album
"Soul Free"	2017	—	Non-album single
"Take It Down" (featuring Rubi Du)	2018	—	Bloom
"Set It Off"	2018	—	Bloom
"Bump Bump" (featuring Church Leon)	2019	—	New Views
"Mood"	2019	37	New Views
"So Low" (featuring Paige)	2019	—	New Views
"Time Out" (featuring Abdul Kay)	2019	—	New Views
"Pon It"	2020	—	3 Nights in Amsterdam
"Flying" (with Abdul Kay, Blaze the Emperor, Mo Muse and Raiza Biza as BLKCITY)	2020	—	TBA
"Shut Up!"	2020	—	3 Nights in Amsterdam
"From Tha Jump"	2021	—	Non-album singles
"Can't Fake It"	2022	39	Non-album singles
"Moment" (featuring Kranium)	2023	—	Feels Like Home
"Ring Ring" (featuring Gold Fang)	2023	—	Feels Like Home
"Hold Me Down"	2023	—	Feels Like Home
"Come Find Me"	2024	—	Feels Like Home
"Talk of the Town"	2024	—	Feels Like Home
"Commando"	2024	—	Feels Like Home
"Life Is Lifting"	2025	—	
"Not Today"	2026	—	Matters of the Heart
"See You There"	2026	—	Matters of the Heart
"Can I"	2026	—	Matters of the Heart

==== As featured artist ====
Title	Year	Album
"Expose This (Remix)" (Yaw Faso featuring JessB)	2018	Non-album singles
"Bloodlines" (The Adults featuring Estére and JessB)	2018	Non-album singles
"Meditjin" (Baker Boy featuring JessB)	2019	Gela
"The One You Want (60s Song)" (Stan Walker featuring JessB)	2022	All In

== Awards and nominations ==
=== APRA Awards ===
The APRA Awards are presented annually from 1982 by the Australasian Performing Right Association (APRA), "honouring composers and songwriters". They commenced in 1982.

Year	Nominee / work	Award	Result	Ref.
2021	"Meditjin" (Danzal Baker, Jess Bourke, Dion Brownfield, Jerome Farah, Dallas Woods)	Song of the Year	Shortlisted	

=== ARIA Music Awards ===
The ARIA Music Awards is an annual award ceremony event celebrating the Australian music industry. They commenced in 1987.

Year	Nominee / work	Award	Result	Ref.
2020	"Meditjin" (with Baker Boy)	Best Hip Hop Release	Nominated	
2020	"Meditjin" (with Baker Boy)	Best Video	Nominated	

=== Taite Music Prize ===
At the 2020 Taite Music Prize, New Views was one of ten finalists.
