= Miss Kaninna =

Indigenous Australian musician

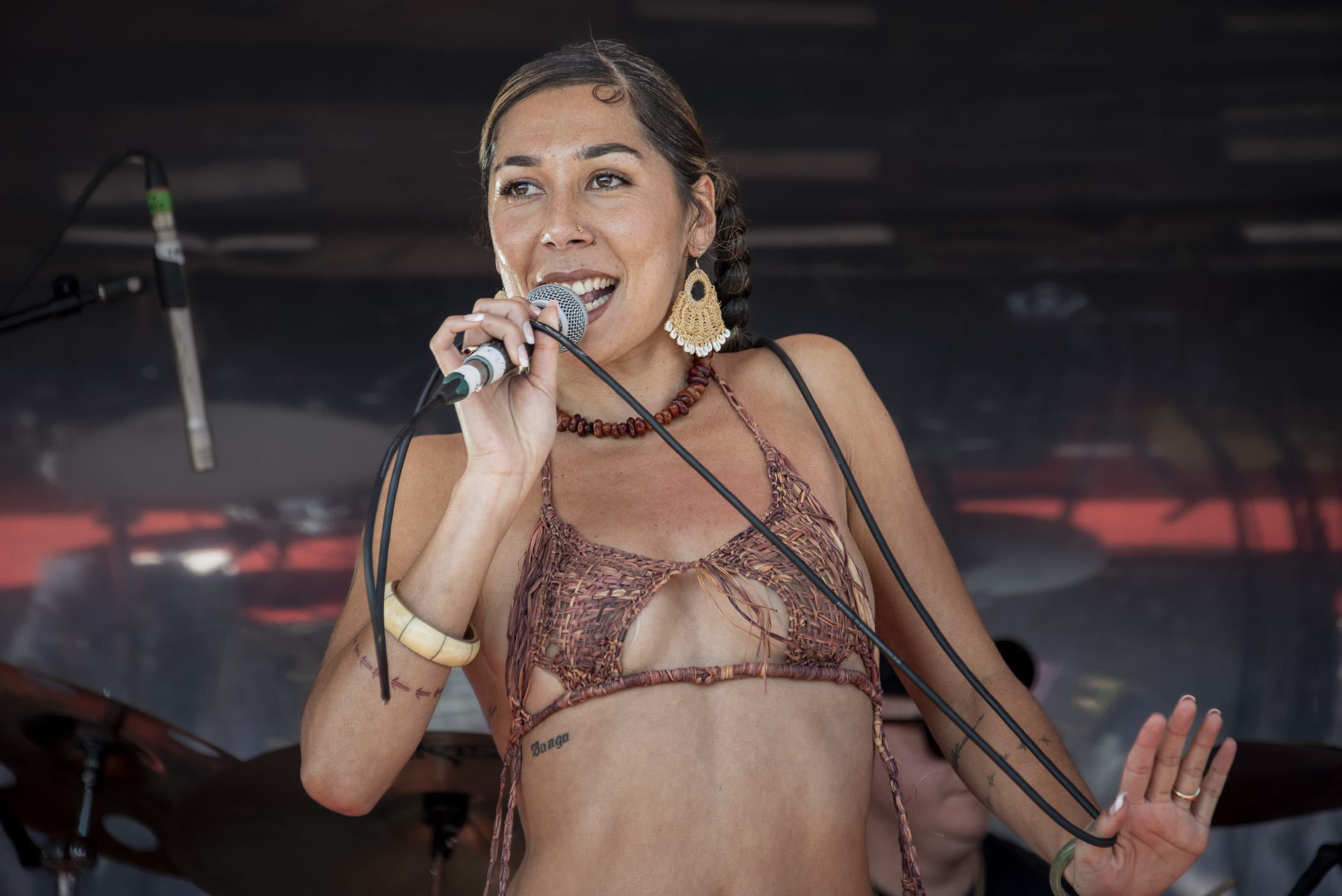

Background information
- Born: Kaninna Langford; Tasmania, Australia
- Genre: Hip-hop
- Occupations: Singer-songwriter, rapper
- Years active: 2023-present

Kaninna Langford (known professionally as Miss Kaninna) is an Australian singer and songwriter.

Miss Kaninna released her self-titled debut EP in September 2024. In 2024, Australian Recording Industry Association announced that Miss Kaninna is the first independent Aboriginal woman to ever be nominated for a debut single at the ARIA Music Awards.

== Early life ==
Kaninna grew up on Bruny Island, Tasmania. She had beginnings in musical theatre. At age 18, Kaninna was accepted into the Western Australian Academy of Performing Arts. Feeling unsupported, Kaninna returned to Tasmania, telling The Music in 2023 "I was living away from home when I was 18 – like I'm from Bruny and then, all of a sudden, I moved to Perth, which is a massive jump. I just kind of fell out of love [with the course] and thought, 'Oh, this is not what I thought it was.'"

In 2021, Miss Kaninna commencing singing backing vocals in community bands before meeting producer Finn Rees.

She was cast as Cynthia in the 2022 national theatre tour of The Sapphires. In 2022, Miss Kaninna debuted her solo music at Dark Mofo before relocating to Melbourne later that year.

== Career ==
=== 2023-2025: Kaninna ===
In 2023, Miss Kaninna signed with Soul Has No Tempo and in April 2023, announced the release of debut single "Blak Britney", a song the artist described as "an anti-establishment anthem". The song received rotation on Triple J.

In October 2024 Miss Kaninna released "Pinnacle Bitch".

In June 2024, Miss Kaninna released "Push Up", a song about moving from Tasmania to Melbourne.

In September 2024, Miss Kaninna released her self-titled debut EP. Upon release Miss Kaninna said "It took me a while to finally name the EP Kaninna. I had other names circling in my head but none of them really felt right. This being my first body of work as an artist I wanted to name it something I can be proud of and look back at in years time and still feel a connection to it. That's when I realised it had to be my name. Since releasing music, people often ask me 'what my real name is' which is so funny because my name is so unique that people must think it's made up."

=== 2026: Black Print ===
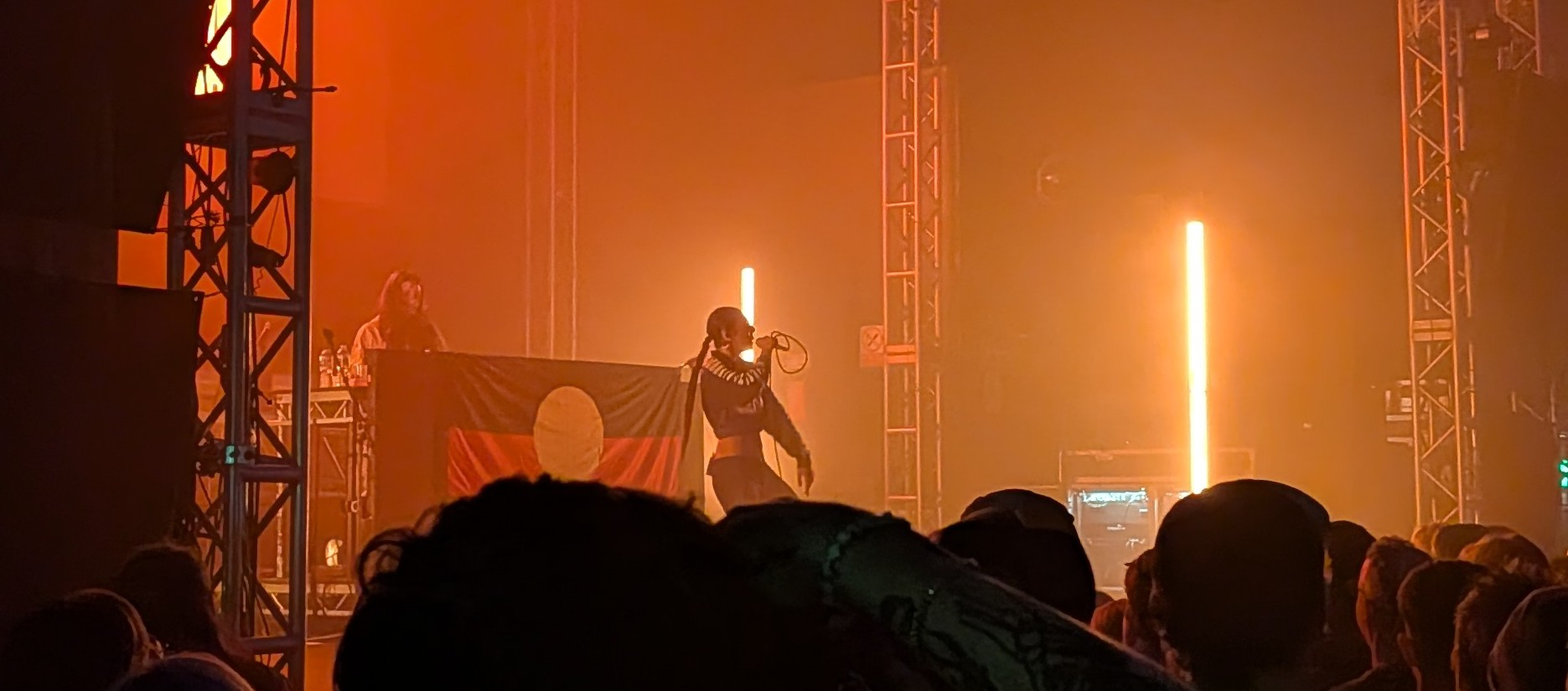
Miss Kaninna on the Kneecap tour, Leeds

In January 2026, Miss Kaninna featured on a billboard in Times Square as part of Amazon Music's Artists to Watch, also appearing on Spotify's EQUAL billboard in February 2026.

In February 2026, she gave away 20 physical copies of her single "Mob Ties" through a local record store, prior to the single's official release later in month.

In June 2026, Miss Kaninna announced the forthcoming release of debut mixtape Blackprint, with the artist saying "We know we're the key to start of civilisation, we're literally the blueprint and we don't care if white people agree or not, we aren't gonna wait for you". The release debuted at number 8 on the ARIA Chart.

== Personal life ==
Langford is a Yorta Yorta, Dja Dja Wurrung, Kalkadoon and Yirandhali woman.

Her grandmother, Rosalind Langford, was a famous painter and renowned activist. Rosalind played an important role in starting the Aboriginal Information Service in the 1970s, the first Aboriginal organisation in Tasmania, and was its first State Secretary.

Her mother, Ruth, works with the Indigenous Women's Legal Centre for women experiencing family violence. Ruth is the founder of Nayri Niara, an Aboriginal social enterprise that works to uplift local communities. Ruth also performed in a funk-reggae band.

In November 2023, Miss Kaninna appeared on an episode of Triple J's Hip Hop Show and delivered pro-Palestine comments, prompting complaints. On 13 December 2023, ABC Ombudsman Fiona Cameron found the Australian Broadcasting Corporation had breached its impartiality standards.

== Discography ==
=== Mixtapes ===
List of mixtapes
Title	Mixtape details	Peak chart positions
Title	Mixtape details	AUS
Blackprint	Released: 21 August 2026; Labels: Soul Has No Tempo / AWAL (SHNT015); Format: LP, digital download	8

=== Extended plays ===
List of extended plays
Title	EP details	Peak chart positions
Title	EP details	AUS
Kaninna	Released: 20 September 2024; Labels: Soul Has No Tempo (198588772645); Format: LP, digital download	— (Note: Kaninna did not enter the top 100 ARIA Album Charts, but peaked at number 5 on the ARIA Australian Artist HipHop/R&B Album Chart.)

=== Singles ===
List of singles
Title	Year	Album / EP
"Blak Britney"	2023	Kaninna
"Pinnacle Bitch"	2023	Kaninna
"Push Up"	2024	Kaninna
"Dawg in Me"	2024	Kaninna
"Backstreets"	2025	
"Mob Ties"	2026	Black Print
"Hand Out" (with Jamahl Yami)	2026	Black Print
"Stolen Wages"	2026	Black Print

== Awards and nominations ==
=== AIR Awards ===
The Australian Independent Record Awards (commonly known informally as AIR Awards) is an annual awards night to recognise, promote and celebrate the success of Australia's Independent Music sector.

Year	Nominee / work	Award	Result	Ref.
2025	Miss Kaninna	Breakthrough Independent Artist of the Year	Won	
2025	Kaninna	Best Independent Hip Hop Album or EP	Won	
2025	Nick Herrera for Kaninna	Independent Mix, Studio or Mastering Engineer of the Year	Won	
2026	"Backstreets" by Miss Kaninna; Directed by Claudia Sangiorgi Dalimore	Independent Music Video of the Year	Nominated	

=== APRA Music Awards ===
The APRA Music Awards were established by the Australasian Performing Right Association in 1982 to honour the achievements of songwriters and music composers, and to recognise their song writing skills, sales and airplay performance, by its members annually.

Year	Nominee / work	Award	Result	Ref.
2025	Miss Kaninna	Emerging Songwriter of the Year	Nominated	

=== ARIA Music Awards ===
The ARIA Music Awards is an annual award ceremony event celebrating the Australian music industry. They commenced in 1987.

Year	Nominee / work	Award	Result	Ref.
2024	"Blak Britney"	Best Independent Release	Nominated	
2024	"Blak Britney"	Best Soul/R&B Release	Nominated	
2024	Best Video	Will Hamilton-Coates for "Blak Britney"	Nominated	
2025	Kaninna	Best Hip Hop/Rap Release	Nominated	
2025	Kaninna	Best Independent Release	Nominated	
2025	Dawg in Me Tour	Best Australian Live Act	Nominated	
2026	Blackprint	Best Solo Artist	Nominated	
2026	Blackprint	Best Hip Hop/Rap Release	Won	
2026	Blackprint	Best Independent Release	Nominated	
2026	"Backstreets"	Best Soul/R&B Release	Nominated	
2026	Claudia Sangiorgi Dalimore for Miss Kaninna – "Backstreets"	Best Video	Nominated	

=== J Awards ===
The J Awards are an annual series of Australian music awards that were established by the Australian Broadcasting Corporation's youth-focused radio station Triple J. They commenced in 2005.

Year	Nominee / work	Award	Result	Ref.
2023	Miss Kaninna	Unearthed Artist of the Year	Won	
2025	Miss Kaninna	Australian Live Act of the Year	Nominated	
2026	Miss Kaninna	Australian Live Act of the Year	Nominated	

=== Music Victoria Awards ===
The Music Victoria Awards are an annual awards night celebrating Victorian music. They commenced in 2006.

Year	Nominee / work	Award	Result	Ref.
2023	"Blak Britney"	Best Song or Track	Nominated	
2023	Miss Kaninna	The Archie Roach Foundation Award for Emerging Talent	Nominated	
2024	"Pinnacle Bitch"	Best Song or Track	Nominated	

=== National Indigenous Music Awards ===
The National Indigenous Music Awards is an annual awards ceremony that recognises the achievements of Indigenous Australians in music.

Year	Nominee / work	Award	Result	Ref.
2025	Miss Kaninna	Best New Artist	Nominated	
2026	Miss Kaninna	Artist of the Year	Nominated	

=== Rolling Stone Australia Awards ===
The Rolling Stone Australia Awards are awarded annually in January or February by the Australian edition of Rolling Stone magazine for outstanding contributions to popular culture in the previous year.

Year	Nominee / work	Award	Result	Ref.
2025	Miss Kaninna	Best New Artist	Shortlisted	
