= National Indigenous Music Awards 2021 =

Indigenous Music awards in Australia

- Date: 14 November 2021
- Venue: Darwin Amphitheatre Northern Territory, Australia
- Hosted by: Steven Oliver

Highlights
- Most nominations: Baker Boy, Sycco, The Kid Laroi (3)
- Website: nima.musicnt.com.au

Television/radio coverage
- Network: National Indigenous Television

The National Indigenous Music Awards 2021 were the forthcoming 18th annual National Indigenous Music Awards. They were scheduled to occur on 8 August 2021 at the Darwin Amphitheatre however on 28 July 2021, were postponed until further notice due to the COVID-19 pandemic in Australia. On 11 October 2021, it was announced the NIMAs have partnered with triple j and its First Nations show, Blak Out to create a two-hour special on 14 November 2021.

Creative Director Ben Graetz said "2021 will bring the event to Australia across many platforms, led by our long-time partners NITV, while creating a special night of connection under the stars here on Larrakia Country."

The nominees were announced on 8 July 2021.

== Performers ==
Performers announced to perform as of May 2021,

- Baker Boy
- Miiesha
- Electric Fields
- King Stingray
- Dallas Woods and Kee'Ahn
- Alice Skye

== Hall of Fame inductee ==
- Kev Carmody

== Awards ==
The nominations and winners

Artist of the Year

Artist	Result
Sycco	Nominated
Birdz	Nominated
Miiesha	Nominated
Baker Boy	Nominated
The Kid Laroi	Won
Jessica Mauboy	Nominated

New Talent of the Year

Artist	Result
J-MILLA	Nominated
Beddy Rays	Nominated
King Stingray	Nominated
Budjerah	Won
Chasing Ghosts	Nominated

Album of the Year

Artist and album	Result
Tia Gostelow – Chrysalis	Nominated
The Kid Laroi – F*ck Love	Nominated
Leah Flanagan – Colour by Number	Nominated
Made for This – JK-47	Won
Benny Walker – Chosen Line	Nominated

Film Clip of the Year

Artist and song	Result
Baker Boy featuring Yirrmal– "Ride"	Won
Troy Cassar-Daley – "Back On Country"	Nominated
Sycco – "My Ways"	Nominated
Tia Gostelow – "Two Lovers"	Nominated

Song of the Year

Artist and song	Result
Baker Boy, Dallas Woods & Sampa The Great – "Better Days"	Nominated
Birdz – "Bagi-la-m Bargan"	Nominated
Miiesha – "Damaged"	Won
The Kid Laroi – "Without You"	Nominated
Sycco – "Dribble"	Nominated

Community Clip of the Year

Artist and song	Result
Kakadu Collective and Victor Rostron – "Mayali"	Won
Dunghutti community in South West Rocks – "Fig Tree"	Nominated
Mob – "Barrunba (Dreaming)"	Nominated
Gunbalanya School – "Stories of the Land"	Nominated
Gunbalanya School – "Talk About Emotions"	Nominated
Students of Peppimenarti School – "Stand Strong"	Nominated

Indigenous Language Award

Artist and song	Result
Guwanbal Gurruwiwi and Netanela Mizrahii – "The Djari Project"	Won
Shellie Morris and Jason Durrurrnga – "Dharuk Gurtha"	Nominated
Garrangali Band – "Tongues of the Fire"	Nominated
Stuart Joel Nuggett – "I Am That Man/Ngaaya-Baaya"	Nominated
Stuart Joel Nuggett – "Monsoon/Kuyubulu"	Nominated
