= Kobie Dee =

Australian musician

- Born: Kobie Duncan; 1997 (age 28–29); Maroubra, New South Wales
- Genres: Australian hip hop
- Occupations: Singer; songwriter; rapper
- Years active: 2018–present
- Label: Bad Apples Music (2019–present)
- Website: kobiedee.com

Kobie Duncan (born 1997) known professionally as Kobie Dee is an Aboriginal singer, songwriter and rapper. Kobie Dee released his debut EP in 2021. At the 2022 J Awards he won the Done Good Award for enriching First Nations communities.

He is a Gomeroi man from Maroubra, New South Wales.

== Early life ==
Kobie Duncan grew up on Bidjigal country, modern day Maroubra, New South Wales. He grew up without a father in his life.

At age 10, Duncan wrote his first song after listening to "Eazy-Duz-It" by Eazy-E. At age 10, Kobie attended Weave's Kool Kids Program and met Mardi Diles, who would later become his manager. Kobie "looked up to" Briggs, who he met at a local performance in 2018 and whose label he would sign to in 2019.

== Career ==
=== 2018–present: Career beginnings and Gratitude Over Pity ===
Kobie Dee released his debut single "Right Now" in May 2018.

In 2019 Kobie met Nooky, an artist signed to Bad Apples Music label, who heard and forwarded his song "About a Girl" to Briggs, who signed him to Bad Apples the same year.

In November 2021, Kobie Dee released his debut EP, Gratitude Over Pity. It was produced by Papertoy, Jaytee Hazard and Magic Nic. As per the press release, the resulting EP is a "pen-to-paper journey, thematically encapsulating how real-time events and inspired moments have helped uncover a perspective of gratitude and appreciation towards the present through a lens of dedicated optimism."

About the EP, GQ said "Kobie Dee implement his trademark technical flow over five tracks which range from bouncing, catchy songs to introspective, raw stories."

In January 2023, Kobie Dee completed a six-week residency hosting Triple J's Hip Hop Show.

In July 2024, Kobie released his second EP ’Chapter 26, an EP he describes as "a journey through my life, from being a young Blak man in Australia, to becoming a father and navigating fatherhood from a place of having an absent father myself".

== Personal life ==
In April 2019, Kobie became a father to a daughter named Kali.

Kobie is a youth ambassador for Weave Youth and Community Services and Just Reinvest NSW.

In 2021, Kobie launched the podcast Know Role Models where he converses with First Nations People.

== Discography ==
=== Extended plays ===
List of EPs, with selected details
Title	Details
Gratitude Over Pity	Released: 5 November 2021; Label: Bad Apples, Universal Music Australia; Formats: Digital download, streaming
Chapter 26	Released: 26 July 2024; Label: Bad Apples, Universal Music Australia; Formats: Digital download, streaming

=== Certified singles ===
List of certified singles.
Title	Year	Certification	Album
"Jody"	2019	ARIA: Gold	non album single
"About a Girl"	2021	ARIA: Gold	Non-album single

== Awards and nominations ==
=== AIR Awards ===
The Australian Independent Record Awards (commonly known informally as AIR Awards) is an annual awards night to recognise, promote and celebrate the success of Australia's Independent Music sector.

Year	Nominee / work	Award	Result	Ref.
2022	Gratitude Over Pity	Best Independent Hip Hop Album or EP	Nominated	

=== ARIA Music Awards ===
The ARIA Music Awards are a set of annual ceremonies presented by Australian Recording Industry Association (ARIA), which recognise excellence, innovation, and achievement across all genres of the music of Australia. They commenced in 1987.

Year	Nominee / work	Award	Result	Ref.
2024	Chapter 26	Best Hip Hop/Rap Release	Nominated	
2024	Kobie Dee - NRL & AFL: Warriors & Storyteller (Fox Sports Australia)	Best Use of an Australian Recording in an Advertisement	Nominated	

=== J Awards ===
The J Awards are an annual series of Australian music awards that were established by the Australian Broadcasting Corporation's youth-focused radio station Triple J. They commenced in 2005.

Year	Nominee / work	Award	Result	Ref.
2022	Kobie Dee	Done Good Award	Won	

=== National Indigenous Music Awards ===
The National Indigenous Music Awards recognise excellence, innovation and leadership among Aboriginal and Torres Strait Islander musicians from throughout Australia. They commenced in 2004.

Year	Nominee / work	Award	Result	Ref.
2019	Kobie Dee	New Talent of the Year	Nominated	
2023	Kobie Dee	Artist of the Year	Nominated	

=== National Indigenous Music Awards ===
The National Indigenous Music Awards is an annual awards ceremony that recognises the achievements of Indigenous Australians in music.

Year	Nominee / work	Award	Result	Ref.
2026	South Summit	Artist of the Year	Nominated	
2026	"Top of the Hill"	Film Clip of the Year	Nominated	

=== NSW Music Prize ===
The NSW Music Prize aims to "celebrate, support and incentivise" the NSW's most talented artists, with "the aim of inspiring the next generations of stars". It commenced in 2025.

Year	Nominee / work	Award	Result	Ref.
2025	Chapter 26	NSW Music Prize	Nominated	
