= Dallas Woods =

Australian rapper

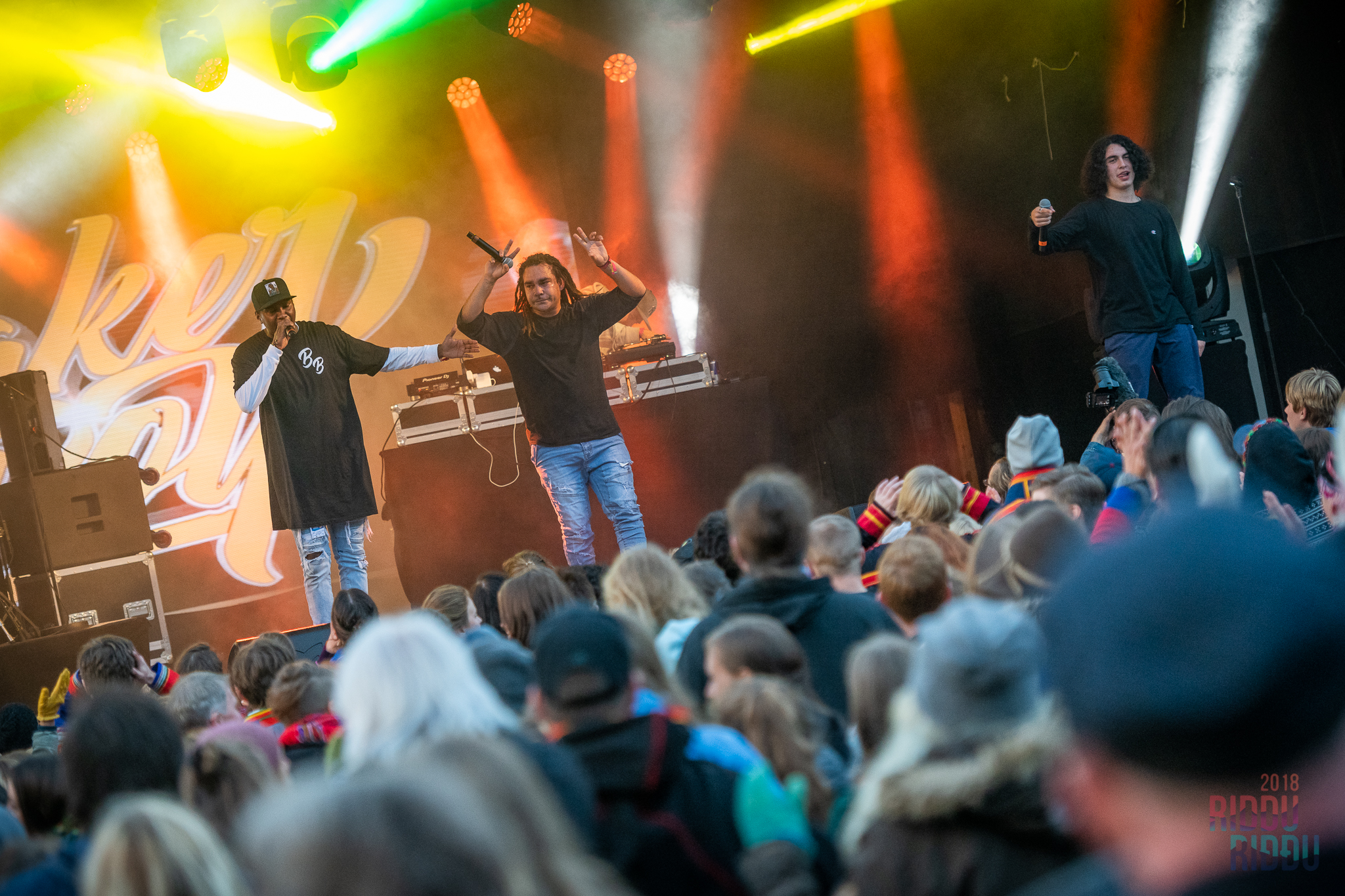
- Dallas Woods performing with Baker Boy (left) and Kian (right) at Riddu Riđđu in 2018

Background information
- Born: Wyndham, East Kimberley, Australia
- Genres: Hip hop; R&B
- Occupations: Rapper; singer; songwriter
- Instrument: Vocals
- Years active: 2018–present
- Website: dallaswoodsmc.com

Dallas Woods is an Indigenous Australian rapper and singer. Woods is known for his role on ABC Kids' Move It Mob Style and in 2018 as Baker Boy's support act on his national tour. Woods gained attention by winning the New Talent Song of the Year Award for Baker Boy's track "Mr La Di Da Di", cowritten with Baker Boy, Jerome Farah, and Dion Brownfield.

== Early life ==
Dallas Woods was born in Wyndham, East Kimberley. He left school at 15 and pursued a career as a dancer at Indigenous Hip Hop Projects.

== Career ==
=== 2018: Baker Boy support act and "9 Times Out of 10" ===
In 2018, Woods released his debut single, "9 Times Out of 10" and featured on Baker Boy's single "Black Magic". He performed at Splendour in the Grass in 2018.

=== 2019–present: "Chapter One" and "If It Glitters It's Gold" ===
In July 2019, Woods was nominated for New Talent of the Year at the 16th Annual National Indigenous Music Awards. On 22 May 2020, he released the single "If It Glitters It's Gold".

On 23 September 2020, Woods released "Better Days" with Baker Boy and Sampa the Great.

=== 2023: 3% ===
In October 2023, Woods formed the supergroup 3% with Nooky and Angus Field. The trio's name represents the Australian population that are Aboriginal and Torres Strait Islanders. Their debut single, "Our People", featured the Presets, sampling their song "My People". Their debut album, Kill the Dead, was released on 9 August 2024. On 10 August 2024, "Our People" won Song of the Year at the National Indigenous Music Awards 2024.

== Discography ==
=== Albums ===
List of albums, with selected details
Title	Details
Julie's Boy	Released: 11 March 2022; Format: Digital; Label: Dallas Woods

=== Singles ===
==== As lead artist ====
List of singles, with year released and album name shown
Title	Year	Album
"9 Times Out of 10"	2018	Non-album singles
"Hoodlum" (featuring Jerome Farah)	2018	Non-album singles
"Chapter One"	2019	Non-album singles
"If It Glitters It's Gold"	2020	Non-album singles
"Better Days" (with Baker Boy and Sampa the Great)	2020	Non-album singles
"Heaven of My Own" (featuring Miiesha)	2020	Non-album singles
"Stranger" (featuring Kee'Ahn)	2021	Non-album singles
"Moon Boot Freestyle" (with Juju)	2022	Julie's Boy

==== As featured artist ====
List of singles, with year released and album name shown
Title	Year	Album
"Black Magic" (Baker Boy featuring Dallas Woods)	2018	Non-album single

==== Songwriting credits ====
List of songwriting credits, with year released and album name shown
Title	Year	Album
"Ride" (Baker Boy featuring Yirrmal)	2021	Gela

== Awards and nominations ==
=== APRA Awards ===
The APRA Awards are presented annually from 1982 by the Australasian Performing Right Association (APRA), "honouring composers and songwriters".

Year	Nominee / work	Award	Result	Ref.
2019	"Mr La Di Da Di" (Danzal Baker, Dion Brownfield, Jerome Farah, Dallas Woods)	Urban Work of the Year	Nominated	
2020	"Cool as Hell" (Danzal Baker, Carl Dimataga, Jesse Ferris, Morgan Jones, Brendan Tuckerman, Dallas Woods)	Most Performed Urban Work of the Year	Nominated	
2021	"Meditjin" (Danzal Baker, Jess Bourke, Dion Brownfield, Jerome Farah, Dallas Woods)	Song of the Year	Shortlisted	
2022	"Ride" (Danzal Baker, Yirrmal Marika, Philip Norman, Dallas Woods)	Song of the Year	Shortlisted	
2025	"Won't Stop" (3% featuring Jessica Mauboy) (Danzal Baker, Andrew Burford, Madeline Crabtree, Corey Webster, Dallas Woods)	Song of the Year	Shortlisted	
2026	"Voice of Resistance" (Fred Leone, Mariah Alone, Dion Brownfield, Caleb Tasker, Skye Thomas, Corey Webster, Dallas Woods)	Best Music for an Advertisement	Nominated	

=== National Indigenous Music Awards ===
The National Indigenous Music Awards is an annual awards ceremony that recognises the achievements of Indigenous Australians in music. The award ceremony commenced in 2004. As of 2020, Woods has received three nominations.

Year	Nominee / work	Award	Result	Ref.
2019	Himself	New Talent of the Year	Nominated	
2020	Himself	New Talent of the Year	Nominated	
2020	"If It Glitters It's Gold"	Film Clip of the Year	Nominated	
2021	"Better Days (with Baker Boy & Sampa the Great)	Song of the Year	Nominated	
2022	Julie's Boy	Album of the Year	Nominated	
