= Black Magic (Baker Boy song) =

Single by Baker Boy featuring Dallas Woods
- Released: 13 July 2018
- Length: 3:24
- Label: Danzal Baker, Dallas Woods
- Songwriters: Jerome Farah, Dallas Woods, Danzal Baker, Dion Brownfield
- Producer: Jerome Farah

Baker Boy singles chronology
| "Mr La Di Da Di" (2018) | "Black Magic" (2018) | "Cool as Hell" (2019) |

Music video
- "Black Magic" on YouTube

"Black Magic" is a song by Australian musician Baker Boy, which features vocals from fellow Indigenous Australian Dallas Woods. It was released in July 2018.

The song is inspired by sports heroes who have stood up against racism in the past, including athlete Cathy Freeman and AFL legend Nicky Winmar who stood up against the crowd's racial abuse in a match between St Kilda and Collingwood in 1993. The song also references the Stolen Generation and Kevin Rudd's apology to Australia's Indigenous peoples in 2008.

At the 2018 National Indigenous Music Awards, the song was nominated for Song of the Year.

== Background ==
Raised in the remote Northern Territory communities of Yurrwi and Maningrida, 21 year-old Danzel Baker, a.k.a. Baker Boy, has released "Black Magic", featuring Dallas Woods. The song is performed in Yolngu Matha and English, representing his bloodlines. Danzel Baker and Dallas Woods met when Baker Boy was 17 and Dallas was 21 and the two started writing songs together, including Baker Boy's previous single "Mr. La Di Da Di".

== Music video ==
The music video was filmed on the Mornington Peninsula and Melbourne, Victoria and directed by BraydenFunFilms. It was released on 12 July 2018.

== Reception ==
Beat Magazine said "The politically-charged number packs a punch, though it is swathed in positivity and offers a feel-good message of empowerment overall, with chorus lines like 'young, black and gifted, talking the whole package' leading the track."

Al Newstead from Triple J said "The single has a much tougher sound than we've come to expect from the Fresh Prince of positivity. Dropping bars in both English and Yolngu Mata language, his vibrant, uplifting flow shines through but this time it's paired with a political punch."

Tristan Winter from Joy 94.9 said "'Black Magic' is proving to be a crowd favourite taking things to next level with a fierce chorus and brutal guitars... This completely electric tune demands your attention!"

The Music Network said "Packing his biggest punch so far without easing up on the joy and positivity that are his trademarks, Baker Boy riffs on 'the power of black magic' as well as being 'young, gifted and black', casting a direct line back to Nina Simone's classic anthem for the 1960s Civil Rights movement."
