= Gela (album) =

Studio album by Baker Boy
- Released: 15 October 2021
- Length: 43:40
- Languages: English; Yolŋu Matha
- Labels: Island Australia; Universal Australia
- Producers: Pip Norman (Note: Track 4); Carl Dimataga (Note: Track 6); Morgan Jones (Note: Track 6); Willie Tafa (Note: Track 7); Jerome Farah (Note: Track 12)

Baker Boy chronology
Gela (2021)	Djandjay (2025)

Singles from Gela
- 1. "Cool as Hell" Released: 25 January 2019; 2. "Meditjin" Released: 21 November 2019; 3. "Move" Released: 27 March 2020; 4. "Ride" Released: 25 March 2021; 5. "My Mind" Released: 15 July 2021; 6. "Butterflies" Released: 17 September 2021; 7. "Survive" Released: 15 October 2021

Gela is the debut studio album by Indigenous Australian rapper Baker Boy, released on 15 October 2021 through Island Records Australia and Universal Music Australia. Gela features guest appearances from JessB, G Flip, Jerome Farah, Thando, Yirrmal, Lara Andallo, and Uncle Jack Charles, alongside production from former TZU member Pip Norman, Willie Tafa, Carl Dimataga, Morgan Jones and Farah.

The album title Gela is Baker's skin name in Yolngu culture.

Gela was supported by seven singles—"Cool as Hell", "Meditjin", "Move", "Ride", "My Mind", "Butterflies", and "Survive".

At the J Awards of 2021, the album was nominated for Australian Album of the Year. At the National Indigenous Music Awards 2022, the album won Album of the Year.

At the 2022 ARIA Music Awards, the album won Album of the Year, Best Solo Artist, Best Hip Hop Release/Rap Release, Best Mixed Album and Best Cover Art.

At the 2022 Music Victoria Awards, the album won Best Victorian Album.

== Background ==
Baker's debut album follows several years of releasing stand-alone singles. On 18 January 2019, Triple J published a piece detailing their most anticipated albums of the year, which featured Baker's forthcoming debut on the list. A representative for him detailed the album's musicality, revealing it would include "dancehall, traditional, trap, G-Funk and your original Baker Boy styles." On 25 January 2020, in an interview with The Sydney Morning Herald's Craig Mathieson, Baker discussed his intention to release an album before the end of the year, stating: "Finishing an album is one of my main priorities for this year. It's almost finished, so I want everyone to get ready for what's going to happen." On 27 March, Baker premiered the single "Move" on Triple J's Sally & Erica. In an accompanying interview, he revealed details of the album, saying he was "super-pumped" about it, and was "three or two" songs away from completing it.

== Recording ==
During recording for the album alongside various producers, Baker worked 14-hour days from 10am to midnight (AEST).

== Release ==
On 13 April 2018, Baker first teased a debut album alongside the premiere of "Mr. La Di Da Di" in a Triple J interview, stating that he hoped to release an album or EP "by July or even two months after that", adding "if I can't do it this year, I'll have two albums next year." On 4 May 2018, he further teased his debut album, stating he was "currently working on finishing up [his] album. Baker initially intended to release his debut album in mid-2019 and then August, and again in 2020. On 24 March 2021, in an interview with Triple J's Bryce & Ebony, Baker reaffirmed his intention to release a debut album. On 16 July, a day after the release of "My Mind", Baker announced that the album would be titled Gela and revealed its release date of 15 October. Gela has been described as highly anticipated.

== Promotion ==
=== Singles ===
Gela was supported by seven singles.

"Cool as Hell" was released on 25 January 2019 as the album's lead single.

"Meditjin", featuring JessB, was released as the second single on 21 November 2019. (Note: "Meditjin" was described as a standalone single upon release, before later being confirmed as the second single.)

"Move" was released as the third single on 27 March 2020.

"Ride", featuring Yirrmal, was released as the fourth single on 25 March 2021.

"My Mind", featuring G Flip, was released on 15 July 2021 as the album's fifth single.

"Butterflies" was released on 17 September 2021 as the album's sixth single.

"Survive", featuring Uncle Jack Charles, was released alongside the album on 15 October 2021 as the seventh and final single.

=== Marketing ===
On 19 July 2021, Baker made an appearance as a guest host on eighth episode of the ninth series of Have You Been Paying Attention?, during which he discussed his forthcoming album and the release of his single "My Mind".

== Artwork ==
According to Rolling Stone Australia, Gela's front cover features "striking artwork by iconic street artist Adnate [that] perfectly encapsulates the concept behind the record, which sees Baker Boy coming to terms with the sudden fame he's experienced in the past few years, while still maintaining close ties to his family and community in Arnhem Land."

== Critical reception ==
Andrew McMillen of the Australian praised the album as "impressive and versatile", writing that Baker "balance[d] poppy accessibility with battle-ready fierceness and deeper messages."

== Track listing ==
Gela track listing
No.	Title	Writer(s)	Producer(s)	Length
1.	"Announcing the Journey" (performed by Glen Gurruwiwi)			0:52
2.	"Survive" (featuring Uncle Jack Charles)	Danzal Baker; Charles		3:14
3.	"My Mind" (featuring G Flip)	Baker; Georgia Filpo; Dallas Woods	Philip "Pip" Norman	3:17
4.	"Ride" (featuring Yirrmal)	Baker; Yirrmal Marika; Woods; Norman	Norman	3:39
5.	"Butterflies"			3:56
6.	"Cool as Hell"	Baker; Brendan Tuckerman; Carl Dimataga; Woods; Jesse Ferris; Morgan Jones	Dimataga; Jones	3:06
7.	"Move"	Baker; Woods; James Iheakanwa; Willie Tafa		2:46
8.	"Headphones" (featuring Lara Andallo)	Baker; Andallo		2:46
9.	"Somewhere Deep" (featuring Yirrmal)	Baker; Marika		3:34
10.	"Funk with Us"			3:03
11.	"Stupid Dumb"			3:15
12.	"Meditjin" (featuring JessB)	Baker; Jess Bourke; Farah; Woods; Dion Brownfield; Jerome Farah	Farah	2:59
13.	"Ain't Nobody Like You" (featuring Jerome Farah)	Baker; Farah		3:35
14.	"MYWD" (featuring Thando)	Baker; Thando Sikwila		3:38
Total length:				43:40

== Personnel ==
=== Musicians ===
- Danzal Baker – main artist, associated performer, vocals, writing (1–14)

Other musicians

- Georgia Filpo – vocals, writing (3)
- Yirrmal Marika – vocals, writing (4)
- Dallas Woods – writing (3, 4, 6, 7)
- Pip Norman – writing, production (4)
- Justin Marshall – performing, percussion (4)
- Lachlan Mclean – performing, baritone saxophone, tenor (4)
- Luke Dubber – performing, synthesiser (4)
- Tristan Ludowyk – performing, trumpet (4)
- Brendan Tuckerman – lyricist (6)
- Carl Dimataga – lyricist (6)
- Jesse Ferris – lyricist (6)
- Morgan Jones – lyricist (6)
- James Iheakanwa – lyricist (7)
- Willie Tafa – lyricist (7)
- Jessica Bourke – vocals, writing (12)
- Jerome Farah – vocals (13), writing (12–13)

=== Technical ===
- Matt Colton – mastering, studio personnel (1–5, 7–14)
- Andrei Eremin – mixing, studio personnel (2–5, 7–14)
- Carl Dimataga – production (6)
- Morgan Jones – production, studio personnel (6)
- Neville Clark – mastering engineer, studio personnel (6)
- Dave Hammer – mixing, studio personnel (6)
- Willie Tafa – production, engineering, studio personnel (7)
- Jerome Farah – production, engineering, studio personnel (12)

== Charts ==
Chart performance for Gela
Chart (2021)	Peak position
Australian Albums (ARIA)	3

== Release history ==
Release history and formats for Gela
Region	Date	Format	Label	Catalogue	Ref.
Various	15 October 2021	Digital download; streaming	Island Records Australia; Universal Music Australia	Not applicable	
Australia	15 October 2021	CD	Island; Universal	3841120	
Australia	15 October 2021	LP	Island; Universal	3841122	
