= Lime Cordiale discography =

- Studio albums: 3
- EPs: 4
- Singles: 38
- Box sets: 2

Australian pop rock duo Lime Cordiale have released three studio albums, two box sets, four extended plays and thirty-eight singles.

== Albums ==
=== Studio albums ===
List of studio albums, with release date, label and selected chart positions shown
Title	Album details	Peak chart positions		Certifications
Title	Album details	AUS	NZ	Certifications
Permanent Vacation	Released: 13 October 2017; Label: Chugg Music Entertainment (CHG017); Format: CD, LP, digital download, streaming	79	—	RMNZ: Gold
14 Steps to a Better You	Released: 10 July 2020; Label: Chugg Music Entertainment (CHG020); Formats: CD, LP, digital download, streaming	1	32	ARIA: Platinum; RMNZ: Gold
Enough of the Sweet Talk	Released: 26 July 2024; Label: Chugg Music Entertainment (CHG036); Formats: CD, LP, digital download, streaming	1	37	
"—" denotes a recording that did not chart or was not released in that territory.

=== Live albums ===
Title	Album details	Peak chart positions
Title	Album details	AUS
Live from the Sydney Opera House (with the Sydney Symphony Orchestra)	Released: 6 November 2026; Label: Chugg Music Entertainment; Formats: 2× vinyl, CD, digital	12

== Box sets ==
Title	Album details
Relapse Box Set	Released: 13 November 2020; Label: Chugg Music Entertainment (CHG023); Formats: 2× vinyl; Includes Falling Up the Stairs and Road to Paradise EPs and the 6 bonus tracks from the November 2020 deluxe reissue of 14 Steps to a Better You
The Collection Box Set	Released: 13 November 2020; Label: Chugg Music Entertainment (CHG024); Formats: 4× vinyl; Includes: Falling Up the Stairs and Road to Paradise EPs, Permanent Vacation and the deluxe reissue of 14 Steps to a Better You

== Extended plays ==
List of EPs, with release date and label shown
Title	Details	Peak chart positions
Title	Details	AUS
Faceless Cat	Released: 6 July 2012; Label: Lime Music / MGM (LIME001); Format: CD, digital download, streaming	—
Falling Up the Stairs	Released: 6 September 2013; Label: Chugg Music / MGM (CHG001); Format: CD, digital download, streaming	—
Road to Paradise	Released: 27 November 2015; Label: Chugg Music (CHG009); Format: CD, digital download, streaming	—
Cordi Elba (with Idris Elba)	Released: 14 January 2022; Label: Chugg Music, 7Wallace; Format: CD, LP, digital download, streaming	9
"—" denotes a recording that did not chart or was not released in that territory.

== Singles ==
List of singles, with year released, selected chart positions and certifications, and album name shown
Title	Year	Peak chart positions			Certifications	Album
Title	Year	AUS	JJJ Hottest 100	NZ Hot	Certifications	Album
"Say It"	2011	—	—	—		Non-album singles
"Bonne Nuit, Je Suis"	2011	—	—	—		Non-album singles
"Cry with Music"	2011	—	—	—		Non-album singles
"Pretty Girl"	2012	—	—	—		Faceless Cat
"Bullshit Aside"	2013	—	—	—		Falling Up the Stairs
"Sleeping at Your Door"	2013	—	—	—		Falling Up the Stairs
"Hanging Upside Down"	2015	—	—	—	ARIA: Gold	Road to Paradise
"Feel Alright"	2015	—	—	—		Road to Paradise
"Not That Easy"	2015	—	—	—		Road to Paradise
"Waking Up Easy"	2016	—	—	—	ARIA: 2× Platinum; RMNZ: Platinum	Non-album single
"Temper Temper"	2017	—	—	—	ARIA: 2× Platinum; RMNZ: Platinum	Permanent Vacation
"Risky Love"	2017	—	—	—	ARIA: Gold	Permanent Vacation
"Naturally"	2017	—	—	—	ARIA: Platinum; RMNZ: Gold	Permanent Vacation
"Following Fools"	2018	—	—	—		14 Steps to a Better You
"Dirt Cheap"	2018	—	86	—	ARIA: Platinum	14 Steps to a Better You
"Money"	2019	—	32	—	ARIA: 2× Platinum; RMNZ: Gold	14 Steps to a Better You
"Inappropriate Behaviour"	2019	—	13	—	ARIA: 2× Platinum; RMNZ: Platinum	14 Steps to a Better You
"Robbery"	2019	63	7	28	ARIA: 4× Platinum; RMNZ: Platinum	14 Steps to a Better You
"I Touch Myself" (Triple J Like a Version)	2019	— (Note: "I Touch Myself (Triple J Like a Version)" did not enter the ARIA Singles Chart, but peaked at number nineteen on the ARIA Australian Artists Singles Chart.)	4 (Note: "I Touch Myself" polled at No. 17 in the Triple J Hottest 100 of 2019 and No. 4 of Hottest 100 of Australian Songs).	—		Non-album single (Note: Later included on the 2025 compilation Triple J's Best Australian Like A Version)
"Addicted to the Sunshine"	2020	—	20	32		14 Steps to a Better You
"On Our Own"	2020	—	11	20	ARIA: Gold	14 Steps to a Better You
"Screw Loose"	2020	—	16	27		14 Steps to a Better You
"Reality Check Please"	2020	—	25	—		14 Steps to a Better You (Deluxe Edition)
"Ticks Me Off"	2021	—	—	—		14 Steps to a Better You (Deluxe Edition)
"Mess" (with Iluka)	2021	—	—	—		Queen of Turbulent Hearts
"No Plans to Make Plans"	2021	—	26	37		14 Steps to a Better You
"Apple Crumble" (with Idris Elba)	2021	—	14	—		Cordi Elba
"What's Not to Like" (with Idris Elba)	2021	—	41	—		Cordi Elba
"Holy Moley" (with Idris Elba)	2022	—	93	—		Cordi Elba
"Unnecessary Things" (with Idris Elba)	2022	—	—	—		Cordi Elba
"Facts of Life"	2022	—	15	—		Enough of the Sweet Talk
"Country Club"	2022	—	60	—		Enough of the Sweet Talk
"Colin"	2022	—	34	—		Enough of the Sweet Talk
"Imposter Syndrome"	2023	—	27	34		Enough of the Sweet Talk
"Op Shop Lover" (with Grentperez)	2023	—	—	—		Non-album single
"Pedestal"	2023	—	42	25		Enough of the Sweet Talk
"The Big Reveal; Ou L'Hypocrite"	2024	—	—	—		Enough of the Sweet Talk
"Cold Treatment"	2024	—	60	—		Enough of the Sweet Talk
"Melodramatic Fanatic" (with Ruel)	2025	—	53	34		Non-album single
"—" denotes a recording that did not chart or was not released in that territory.

== Other charted songs ==
List of non-single chart appearances, with year released and album name shown
Title	Year	Peak chart positions	Album
Title	Year	NZ Hot	Album
"Unnecessary Things"	2020	40	14 Steps to a Better You (Deluxe Edition)

== Guest appearances ==
List of non-single album appearances with other performing artists
Title	Year	Album
"Nobody Takes Me Seriously"	2021	True Colours, New Colours: The Songs of Split Enz
