= Live from the Sydney Opera House =

Live from The Sydney Opera House

Live album by Lime Cordiale
- Released: 6 November 2026
- Recorded: October 2025
- Studio: Sydney Opera House
- Label: Chugg

Lime Cordiale chronology
Enough of the Sweet Talk (2024)	Live from The Sydney Opera House (2026)

Live from The Sydney Opera House is the first live album by Australian indie pop band Lime Cordiale with Sydney Symphony Orchestra. The album was recorded over three nights in October 2025 with the orchestra conducted by Vanessa Scammell. The album was released on 6 November 2026 and debuted at number 12 on the ARIA Charts.

== Track listing ==
Live from The Sydney Opera House track listing
No.	Title	Length
1.	"Prelude"	0:58
2.	"Money"	3:58
3.	"Temper Temper"	3:39
4.	"Screw Loose"	4:19
5.	"Addicted to the Sunshine"	4:44
6.	"Naturally"	3:26
7.	"Elephant in the Room"	3:59
8.	"Strangers"	3:42
9.	"Enough of the Sweet Talk"	4:48
10.	"Love Is Off the Table"	5:11
11.	"Colin"	5:34
12.	"No Plans to Make Plans"	4:28
13.	"When I'm Losing It"	3:07
14.	"Hanging Upside Down"	5:36
15.	"For Dad"	1:25
16.	"Household Name"	3:09
17.	"Cold Treatment"	4:19
18.	"Inappropriate Behaviour"	5:07
19.	"Waking Up Easy"	4:17
20.	"Robbery"	4:19

== Charts ==
Weekly chart performance for Live from The Sydney Opera House
Chart (2026)	Peak position
Australian Albums (ARIA)	12
