= Rolling Stone Australia Awards =

Australian music awards

- Country: Australia
- First award: 2010; 16 years ago
- Final award: current

The Rolling Stone Australia Awards are awarded annually in January or February by the Australian edition of Rolling Stone magazine for outstanding contributions to popular culture in the previous year. The awards initially commenced in 2010 and ran until 2015, before being relaunched in March 2021.

== Categories ==
=== 2010–2015 categories ===
The categories have changed each year. The criteria for the 2010 awards were as per below:

- The Rolling Stone Award: The top honour of the year, awarded for an outstanding contribution to popular culture. The winner of this award can come from any area and is open to Australian/New Zealand candidates only.
- Best Female: Awarded to an Australian/New Zealand female for outstanding contribution to popular culture.
- Best Male: Awarded to an Australian/New Zealand male for outstanding contribution to popular culture.
- Artist of the Year: The best all round musical artist of the year. This award is open to Australian/New Zealand candidates only.
- Album of the Year: The best album released in the previous year. This award is open to Australian/New Zealand candidates only.
- Best Live Act: Honouring the best live performance or tour by a band – Australian or international.
- Artist to Watch: This is an acknowledgement of an outstanding emerging artist. This award is open to Australian/New Zealand candidates only.
- The International Award: Awarded to an international male, female or group who have had a profound positive impact on popular culture in Australia/New Zealand.
- Mover & Shaker: Awarded to someone who has changed the game in their particular field this year. The winner of this award can come from any area and is open to Australian/New Zealand candidates only.
- The Immortal: A lifetime achievement award for outstanding contribution to popular culture. This award is open to Australian/New Zealand candidates only.

=== 2021 categories ===
The categories for the 2021 were as below:

- Best Record: An album or an EP released by an Australian artist that has notably impacted the musical landscape.
- Best Single: A song, released as a single by an Australian artist that has notably impacted the musical landscape.
- Best New Artist: An Australian artist whose eligible release(s) has broken through into the public consciousness and notably impacted the musical landscape.
- Rolling Stone Global Award: An Australian artist whose eligible release(s) has broken through into the international public consciousness and notably impacted the musical landscape outside of Australia.
- Rolling Stone Reader's Award:

== Ceremonies ==
A list of awards ceremony dates and locations are listed below.

=== 2010 ===
In inaugural awards took place on 20 January 2010, at Oxford Art Factory, Sydney.

=== 2011 ===
The second Rolling Stone Australia Awards took place on 25 January 2011.

Award	Nominee/ Winner	Result
The Rolling Stone Award	Paul Kelly	Won
Best Female	Clare Bowditch	Won
Best Male	David Michod	Won
Artist of the Year	Angus and Julia Stone	Won
Album of the Year	Innerspeaker by Tame Impala	Won
Best Live Act	Leonard Cohen	Won
Artist to Watch	Boy & Bear	Won
The International Award	Arcade Fire	Won
Mover & Shaker	Julian Assange	Won
The Immortal	Michael Chugg	Won

=== 2012 ===
The third Rolling Stone Australia Awards took place on 25 January 2012

Award	Nominee/ Winner	Result
The Rolling Stone Award	Cold Chisel	Won
Best Female	Megan Washington	Won
Best Male	Gotye	Won
Album of the Year	Prisoner by The Jezabels	Won
Best Live Act	Foo Fighters	Won
Artist to Watch	Kimbra	Won
The International Best Act	Florence + The Machine	Won
Mover & Shaker	Penny Wong	Won
The Immortal	Molly Meldrum	Won

=== 2013 ===
The fourth Rolling Stone Australia Awards took place on 16 January 2013, at Sydney's Beach Road Hotel in Bondi. It was hosted by Tex Perkins.

Award	Nominee/ Winner	Result
The Rolling Stone Award	Michael Gudinski	Won
Album of the Year	Lonerism by Tame Impala	Won
Album of the Year	Drinking from the Sun by Hilltop Hoods	Nominated
Album of the Year	I Awake by Sarah Blasko	Nominated
Album of the Year	Spring and Fall by Paul Kelly	Nominated
Single of the Year	"Ghosts" by The Presets	Won
Music Video of the Year	"Easy Way Out" by Gotye (directed by Darcy Prendergast)	Won
Music Video of the Year	"I Love It" by Hilltop Hoods	Nominated
Music Video of the Year	Bertie Blackman	Nominated
Music Video of the Year	Something for Kate	Nominated
Best Independent Release	Thinking in Textures by Chet Faker	Won
Best Independent Release	The Rubens	Nominated
Best Independent Release	Urthboy	Nominated
Best Live Act	Parkway Drive	Won
Best Live Act	Hilltop Hoods	Nominated
Best Live Act	Jezabels	Nominated
Artist to Watch	Alpine	Unknown
Artist to Watch	Flume	Unknown
Artist to Watch	San Cisco	Unknown

=== 2014 ===
The fifth Rolling Stone Australia Awards took place in February 2014, at Sydney's Beach Road Hotel in Bondi.

Award	Nominee/ Winner	Result
The Rolling Stone Award	Peter Noble	Won
Album of the Year	Pure Heroine by Lorde	Won
Single of the Year	"The End" by The Jezabels	Won
Music Video of the Year	"Is This How You Feel?" by The Preatures (directed by Alex Ryan)	Won
Best Independent Release	Push the Sky Away by Nick Cave & the Bad Seeds	Won
Best Live Act of the Year	Tame Impala	Won
Best New Talent	Lorde	Won
International Act of the Year	Arctic Monkeys	Won
Actor of the Year	Aaron Pedersen for Mystery Road	Won

=== 2015 ===
The sixth Rolling Stone Australia Awards took place on 25 February 2015 at Sydney's Fox Studios. It was hosted by Chit Chat Von Loopin Stab.

Award	Nominee/ Winner	Result
The Rolling Stone Award	Lindy Morrison	Won
Album of the Year	1000 Forms of Fear by Sia	Won
Single of the Year	"Beware the Dog" by The Griswolds	Won
Music Video of the Year	"High" by Peking Duk featuring Nicole Millar (directed by Jeff Johnson and Max Miller)	Won
Best Independent Release	Raw X Infinity by Remi	Won
Best Live Act of the Year	The Delta Riggs	Won
Best New Talent	Tkay Maidza	Won
Movie of the Year	The Babadook	Won
Actor of the Year	Essie Davis for The Babadook	Won
Milestone Award	Triple J	Won

=== 2021 ===
The 2021 ceremony took place on 31 March 2021 at The Argyle, Sydney.

Award	Nominee/ Winner	Result
Best Record	Last Year Was Weird, Vol. 2 by Tkay Maidza	Won
Best Record	I'm Doing It by E^ST	Nominated
Best Record	Our Two Skins by Gordi	Nominated
Best Record	Brain Candy by Hockey Dad	Nominated
Best Record	14 Steps to a Better You by Lime Cordiale	Nominated
Best Record	The Death of Me by Polaris	Nominated
Best Record	The Slow Rush by Tame Impala	Nominated
Best Record	F*ck Love by The Kid Laroi	Nominated
Best Single	"Pretty Lady" by Tash Sultana	Won
Best Single	"Meditjin" by Baker Boy	Nominated
Best Single	"Low" by Chet Faker	Nominated
Best Single	"Life Is a Game of Changing" by DMA's	Nominated
Best Single	"miss andry" by flowerkid	Nominated
Best Single	"Way Down" by Ocean Alley	Nominated
Best Single	"Shook" by Tkay Maidza	Nominated
Best Single	"Salina" by Triple One	Nominated
Best New Artist	Mia Rodriguez	Won
Best New Artist	E^ST	Nominated
Best New Artist	JK-47	Nominated
Best New Artist	Jaguar Jonze	Nominated
Best New Artist	Jerome Farah	Nominated
Best New Artist	Miiesha	Nominated
Best New Artist	Stevan	Nominated
Best New Artist	Yours Truly	Nominated
Rolling Stone Global Award	Tame Impala	Won
Rolling Stone Global Award	5 Seconds of Summer	Nominated
Rolling Stone Global Award	Keith Urban	Nominated
Rolling Stone Global Award	Sia	Nominated
Rolling Stone Global Award	Tash Sultana	Nominated
Rolling Stone Global Award	The Kid Laroi	Nominated
Rolling Stone Global Award	Tones and I	Nominated
Rolling Stone Global Award	Troye Sivan	Nominated
Rolling Stone Reader's Award	Midnight Oil	Won
Rolling Stone Reader's Award	Ball Park Music	Nominated
Rolling Stone Reader's Award	Lime Cordiale	Nominated
Rolling Stone Reader's Award	Sia	Nominated
Rolling Stone Reader's Award	Spacey Jane	Nominated
Rolling Stone Reader's Award	Tame Impala	Nominated
Rolling Stone Reader's Award	The Chats	Nominated
Rolling Stone Reader's Award	Megan Washington	Nominated

=== 2022 ===
The 2022 awards ceremony took place on 30 March 2022 at The Argyle, Sydney, NSW. The nominees were revealed on 13 January 2022.

Award	Nominee/ Winner	Result
Best Record	Smiling with No Teeth by Genesis Owusu	Won
Best Record	Cry Forever by Amy Shark	Nominated
Best Record	Gela by Baker Boy	Nominated
Best Record	Dreamers Are Waiting by Crowded House	Nominated
Best Record	Been Doin' It for a Bit by Ruby Fields	Nominated
Best Record	Rehearsal by Skegss	Nominated
Best Record	Terra Firma by Tash Sultana	Nominated
Best Record	We Will Always Love You by The Avalanches	Nominated
Best Single	"Baby Steps" by Amy Shark	Won
Best Single	"The Angel of 8th Ave." by Gang of Youths	Nominated
Best Single	"We Are the Youth" by Jack River	Nominated
Best Single	"Wild Hearts" by Keith Urban	Nominated
Best Single	"Alive" by Rüfüs Du Sol	Nominated
Best Single	"Blueprint" by Slowly Slowly	Nominated
Best Single	"Stay" by The Kid Laroi	Nominated
Best Single	"Fly Away" by Tones and I	Nominated
Best New Artist	King Stingray	Won
Best New Artist	Cat & Calmell	Nominated
Best New Artist	Genesis Owusu	Nominated
Best New Artist	Jesswar	Nominated
Best New Artist	Masked Wolf	Nominated
Best New Artist	May-a	Nominated
Best New Artist	Peach PRC	Nominated
Best New Artist	Teenage Dads	Nominated
Rolling Stone Global Award	The Kid Laroi	Won
Rolling Stone Global Award	Hiatus Kaiyote	Nominated
Rolling Stone Global Award	Keith Urban	Nominated
Rolling Stone Global Award	Kylie Minogue	Nominated
Rolling Stone Global Award	Masked Wolf	Nominated
Rolling Stone Global Award	Pnau	Nominated
Rolling Stone Global Award	Rüfüs Du Sol	Nominated
Rolling Stone Global Award	Tones and I	Nominated
Rolling Stone Reader's Award	Gordi	Won
Rolling Stone Reader's Award	Cxloe	Nominated
Rolling Stone Reader's Award	Holy Holy	Nominated
Rolling Stone Reader's Award	Jimmy Barnes	Nominated
Rolling Stone Reader's Award	Keith Urban	Nominated
Rolling Stone Reader's Award	Paul Kelly	Nominated
Rolling Stone Reader's Award	Rüfüs Du Sol	Nominated
Rolling Stone Reader's Award	Vika & Linda	Nominated

=== 2023 ===
The nominees were revealed on 1 February 2023. The ceremony took place in Sydney on 4 April 2023.

Award	Nominee/ Winner	Result
Best Record	angel in realtime by Gang of Youths	Won
Best Record	5SOS5 by 5 Seconds of Summer	Nominated
Best Record	Pre Pleasure by Julia Jacklin	Nominated
Best Record	Darker Still by Parkway Drive	Nominated
Best Record	Here Comes Everybody by Spacey Jane	Nominated
Best Record	ReWiggled by The Wiggles	Nominated
Best Record	Meanjin by Thelma Plum	Nominated
Best Record	In Our Own Sweet Time by Vance Joy	Nominated
Best Single	"Hardlight" by Spacey Jane	Won
Best Single	"Only Wanna Be With You" by Amy Shark	Nominated
Best Single	"Ready for the Sky" by Budjerah	Nominated
Best Single	"Rae Street" by Courtney Barnett	Nominated
Best Single	"Brown Eyes Baby" by Keith Urban	Nominated
Best Single	"Growing Up Is" by Ruel	Nominated
Best Single	"Thousand Miles" by The Kid Laroi	Nominated
Best Single	"Clarity" by Vance Joy	Nominated
Best New Artist	Budjerah	Won
Best New Artist	Blake Rose	Nominated
Best New Artist	Eliza & The Delusionals	Nominated
Best New Artist	Forest Claudette	Nominated
Best New Artist	James Johnston	Nominated
Best New Artist	Lara D	Nominated
Best New Artist	Merci, Mercy	Nominated
Best New Artist	Teen Jesus and the Jean Teasers	Nominated
Rolling Stone Global Award	Tash Sultana	Won
Rolling Stone Global Award	Alison Wonderland	Nominated
Rolling Stone Global Award	Gang Of Youths	Nominated
Rolling Stone Global Award	Iggy Azalea	Nominated
Rolling Stone Global Award	Keith Urban	Nominated
Rolling Stone Global Award	Kylie Minogue	Nominated
Rolling Stone Global Award	Rüfüs Du Sol	Nominated
Rolling Stone Global Award	The Wiggles	Nominated
Rolling Stone Global Award	Tones and I	Nominated
Rolling Stone Global Award	Troye Sivan	Nominated
Rolling Stone Global Award	Vance Joy	Nominated
Rolling Stone Reader's Award	Lime Cordiale	Won
Rolling Stone Icon Award	Tina Arena	Won

=== 2024 ===
The nominees were revealed on 4 March 2024 with the ceremony taking place on 26 March 2024.

Award	Nominee/ Winner	Result
Best Record	The Winding Way by The Teskey Brothers	Won
Best Record	Acres by Brad Cox	Nominated
Best Record	DRUMMER by G Flip	Nominated
Best Record	Kimosabé by Dope Lemon	Nominated
Best Record	Manic Dream Pixie by Peach PRC	Nominated
Best Record	Midnight Driving by Teenage Dads	Nominated
Best Record	Not Without My Ghosts by The Amity Affliction	Nominated
Best Record	Something to Give Each Other by Troye Sivan	Nominated
Best Single	"Perfect for You" by Peach PRC	Won
Best Single	"Atmosphere" by Fisher and Kita Alexander	Nominated
Best Single	"Can I Shower at Yours" by Amy Shark	Nominated
Best Single	"Colin" by Lime Cordiale	Nominated
Best Single	"I Used to Be Fun" by Teen Jesus and the Jean Teasers	Nominated
Best Single	"Rhyme Dust" by MK and Dom Dolla	Nominated
Best Single	"Silent Assassin" by Tkay Maidza and Flume	Nominated
Best Single	"Therapy" by Budjerah	Nominated
Best New Artist	Dom Dolla	Won
Best New Artist	Blusher	Nominated
Best New Artist	grentperez	Nominated
Best New Artist	Old Mervs	Nominated
Best New Artist	Oliver Cronin	Nominated
Best New Artist	Royel Otis	Nominated
Best New Artist	Teen Jesus and the Jean Teasers	Nominated
Best New Artist	The Rions	Nominated
Rolling Stone Global Award	Tones and I	Won
Rolling Stone Global Award	DMA's	Nominated
Rolling Stone Global Award	Dom Dolla	Nominated
Rolling Stone Global Award	Fisher	Nominated
Rolling Stone Global Award	Kylie Minogue	Nominated
Rolling Stone Global Award	Tame Impala	Nominated
Rolling Stone Global Award	The Teskey Brothers	Nominated
Rolling Stone Global Award	Troye Sivan	Nominated
Rolling Stone Global Award	Vacations	Nominated
Rolling Stone Icon Award	Crowded House	Won

=== 2025 ===
The ten short listed nominee were revealed on 5 March 2025, with the shortlist to be announced before the ceremony on 9 April 2025 at The Ivy, Sydney.

Award	Nominee/ Winner	Result
Best Record	Cartoon Darkness by Amyl and the Sniffers	Won
Best Record	Inhale/Exhale by Rüfüs Du Sol	Shortlisted
Best Record	Enough of the Sweet Talk by Lime Cordiale	Shortlisted
Best Record	The Second Act by Missy Higgins	Shortlisted
Best Record	Sunday Sadness by Amy Shark	Shortlisted
Best Record	Kill the Dead by 3%	Shortlisted
Best Record	Wild God by Nick Cave and the Bad Seeds	Shortlisted
Best Record	Sweet Justice by Tkay Maidza	Shortlisted
Best Record	3AM (La La La) by Confidence Man	Shortlisted
Best Record	Til My Song Is Done by Emma Donovan	Shortlisted
Best Single	"Freckles" by Thelma Plum	Won
Best Single	"U Should Not Be Doing That" by Amyl and the Sniffers	Shortlisted
Best Single	"Changes" by Empire of the Sun	Shortlisted
Best Single	"girl$" by Dom Dolla	Shortlisted
Best Single	"Stumblin' In" by Cyril	Shortlisted
Best Single	"Beautiful Eyes" by Amy Shark	Shortlisted
Best Single	"If Our Love Is Dead" by Royel Otis	Shortlisted
Best Single	"King" by Baker Boy	Shortlisted
Best Single	"Lately" by Rüfüs Du Sol	Shortlisted
Best Single	"Dance with Me" by Tones and I	Shortlisted
Best New Artist	3%	Won
Best New Artist	Cyril	Shortlisted
Best New Artist	Becca Hatch	Shortlisted
Best New Artist	Mia Wray	Shortlisted
Best New Artist	Gut Health	Shortlisted
Best New Artist	9lives	Shortlisted
Best New Artist	Nick Ward	Shortlisted
Best New Artist	Miss Kaninna	Shortlisted
Best New Artist	The Buoys	Shortlisted
Best New Artist	Lane Pittman	Shortlisted
Best Live Act	Amyl and the Sniffers	Won
Best Live Act	BARKAA	Shortlisted
Best Live Act	Confidence Man	Shortlisted
Best Live Act	Dom Dolla	Shortlisted
Best Live Act	Empire of the Sun	Shortlisted
Best Live Act	Missy Higgins	Shortlisted
Best Live Act	Parkway Drive	Shortlisted
Best Live Act	Teen Jesus and the Jean Teasers	Shortlisted
Best Live Act	Tones and I	Shortlisted
Best Live Act	Troye Sivan	Shortlisted
Rolling Stone Global Award	Dom Dolla	Won
Rolling Stone Global Award	Amyl and the Sniffers	Shortlisted
Rolling Stone Global Award	Confidence Man	Shortlisted
Rolling Stone Global Award	Dean Lewis	Shortlisted
Rolling Stone Global Award	Empire of the Sun	Shortlisted
Rolling Stone Global Award	Luke Hemmings	Shortlisted
Rolling Stone Global Award	Kylie Minogue	Shortlisted
Rolling Stone Global Award	Nick Cave and the Bad Seeds	Shortlisted
Rolling Stone Global Award	Ocean Alley	Shortlisted
Rolling Stone Global Award	The Amity Affliction	Shortlisted
Rolling Stone Global Award	The Kid Laroi	Shortlisted
Rolling Stone Readers Award	Keli Holiday	Won
Rolling Stone Readers Award	Crowded House	Shortlisted
Rolling Stone Readers Award	Delta Goodrem	Shortlisted
Rolling Stone Readers Award	G Flip	Shortlisted
Rolling Stone Readers Award	Gut Health	Shortlisted
Rolling Stone Readers Award	Pond	Shortlisted
Rolling Stone Readers Award	Radio Free Alice	Shortlisted
Rolling Stone Readers Award	The Rions	Shortlisted
Rolling Stone Readers Award	Speed	Shortlisted
Rolling Stone Readers Award	Thelma Plum	Shortlisted
Rolling Stone Icon Award	Icehouse	Won
