= J Awards of 2020 =

16th Annual J Awards

- Date: 19 November 2020
- Venue: Australia
- Website: abc.net.au/triplej

The J Awards of 2020 were the sixteenth annual J Awards, established by the Australian Broadcasting Corporation's youth-focused radio station Triple J.

The eligibility period for releases took place between November 2019 and October 2020.

The winners were announced live on Triple J on 19 November 2020, with Lime Cordiale receiving the Australian Album of the Year Award for their album 14 Steps to a Better You, Archie Roach receiving the Double J Artist of the Year Award, Joey Hunter and Tasman Keith receiving the Australian Video of the Year Award for "Billy Bad Again", JK-47 receiving the Unearthed Artist of the Year Award, and Isol-Aid receiving the Done Good Award.

== Awards ==
=== Australian Album of the Year ===
List of Australian Album of the Year nominees
Artist	Album	Result
Alice Ivy	Don't Sleep	Nominated
Ball Park Music	Ball Park Music	Nominated
DMA's	The Glow	Nominated
Gordi	Our Two Skins	Nominated
JK-47	Made for This	Nominated
Lime Cordiale	14 Steps to a Better You	Won
Miiesha	Nyaaringu	Nominated
Spacey Jane	Sunlight	Nominated
Tame Impala	The Slow Rush	Nominated
The Kid Laroi	F*ck Love	Nominated

=== Double J Artist of the Year ===
List of Double J Artist of the Year nominees
Artist	Result
Archie Roach	Won
Gordi	Nominated
L-FRESH the Lion	Nominated
Rolling Blackouts Coastal Fever	Nominated
Washington	Nominated

=== Australian Video of the Year ===
List of Australian Video of the Year nominees
Director	Artist and Song	Result
Onefour	Onefour – "Welcome to Prison"	Nominated
Sanjay De Silva	Sampa the Great featuring Krown – "Time's Up"	Nominated
Joey Hunter	Tasman Keith – "Billy Bad Again"	Won
Tkay Maidza and Jordan Kirk	Tkay Maidza featuring Kari Faux – "Don't Call Again"	Nominated
Dan Graetz	Violent Soho – "Pick It Up Again"	Nominated

=== Unearthed Artist of the Year ===
List of Unearthed Artist of the Year nominees
Artist	Result
Jaguar Jonze	Nominated
JK-47	Won
Mia Rodriguez	Nominated
Sycco	Nominated
Yours Truly	Nominated

=== You Done Good Award ===
An award to an Australian who has "made an impact on the industry through outstanding achievement, social change or altruistic endeavours".

List of You Done Good nominees
Artist	Notes	Result
Fire Fight Australia	For raising over $11 million for bushfire relief during the 2019–20 Australian bushfire season by holding a stadium concert and live television broadcast.	Nominated
Isol-Aid	For their innovation in producing over 30 online music festivals with local and international artists to raise money during the COVID-19 pandemic.	Won
Lucas Sutton	A 15 year-old who got Aussie bands behind a Support Act charity raffle.	Nominated
Mushroom Group	For bringing music to the masses during COVID-19 pandemic via Music from the Home Front, The State of Music and The Sound.	Nominated
Ziggy Ramo	For his leadership and advocacy of First Nations people during the Black Lives Matter protests in Australia.	Nominated
