= Live at the Sydney Opera House =

Live at the Sydney Opera House may refer to:

- Live at the Sydney Opera House (Olivia Newton-John album), 2008
- Live at the Sydney Opera House (Josh Pyke album), 2016
- Live at the Sydney Opera House (Kate Miller-Heidke album), 2017
- Live at the Sydney Opera House (Joe Bonamassa album), 2019
- Live at the Sydney Opera House (Paul Kelly album), 2019
- Live at the Sydney Opera House (Joseph Tawadros album), 2020
- Live at the Sydney Opera House (Morgan Evans album), 2024
- Live at the Sydney Opera House (Ngaiire album), 2024
- Live at Sydney Opera House, an album by Bryan Adams, 2013
- Live from the Sydney Opera House (Lime Cordiale album), 2026

== See also ==
- Sydney Opera House
