= Mia Rodriguez =

Australian pop music singer-songwriter (born 2002)

- Born: 14 July 2002 (age 24); Sydney, New South Wales, Australia
- Genres: Alternative pop, dance-pop, electropop, alternative R&B
- Occupations: Singer; songwriter
- Instrument: Vocals
- Years active: 2019–present
- Labels: City Pop; Atlantic Records
- Website: www.miarodriguezofficial.com

Mia Rodriguez (born 14 July 2002) is an Australian pop music singer-songwriter. She started her career posting covers and other content on TikTok before releasing original music in 2019.

== Career ==
Rodriguez began uploading cover songs to YouTube in 2014, and she eventually amassed a large following on TikTok. She later credited Troye Sivan with inspiring her to become a singer. In December 2019, she was signed with Michael Chugg's City Pop Records. Her first single, "Emotions," was the label's first release.

Rodriguez switched labels and signed a global deal with Atlantic Records in April 2020 alongside the release of her second single "Psycho," which had amassed 11 million streams by July of that year. Her third single, "Beautiful & Bittersweet" (stylised in all-caps), was released in August 2020 alongside a lyric video. It was produced by Dave Hammer of Sydney-based duo Lime Cordiale.

Rodriguez was a presenter at the 2020 ARIA Music Awards, which was held as a virtual ceremony amidst the COVID-19 pandemic. She made her live debut at the Enmore Theatre supporting Lime Cordiale in March 2021.

== Personal life ==
Rodriguez was brought up in Western Sydney. She is openly pansexual and suffered bullying in her childhood and teenage years as a result of her sexuality and eccentric personality.

== Discography ==
Mia Rodriguez discography
- Singles: 10
- Music videos: 6

=== Singles ===
List of singles as lead artist showing year released and album name
Title	Year	Album
"Emotion"	2019	Non-album singles
"Psycho"	2020	Non-album singles
"Beautiful & Bittersweet"	2020	Non-album singles
"Billion Dollar Bitch" (featuring Yung Baby Tate)	2021	Non-album singles
"Shut Up"	2022	Non-album singles
"Superglue"	2022	Non-album singles
"I Luv U"	2022	Non-album singles
"Ride"	2024	Non-album singles
"Running 4 My Life"	2024	Non-album singles
"Poison Ivy"	2025	Non-album singles

=== Videography ===
Title	Year	Director(s)
"Emotion"	2019	Josh Harris
"Psycho"	2020	Josh Harris
"Beautiful & Bittersweet"	2020	Macario De Souza
"Billion Dollar Bitch"	2021	Josh Harris
"Shut Up"	2022	Josh Harris
"I Luv U"	2022	Josh Harris

== Awards and nominations ==
=== J Awards ===
The J Awards are an annual series of Australian music awards that were established by the Australian Broadcasting Corporation's youth-focused radio station Triple J. They commenced in 2005.

Year	Nominee / work	Award	Result
J Awards of 2020	Mia Rodriguez	Unearthed Artist of the Year	Nominated

=== Rolling Stone Australia Awards ===
The Rolling Stone Australia Awards are awarded annually in January or February by the Australian edition of Rolling Stone magazine for outstanding contributions to popular culture in the previous year.

Year	Nominee / work	Award	Result
2021	Mia Rodriguez	Best New Artist	Won
