= Facts of Life =

Facts of Life may refer to:

- Facts of Life (album), by Bobby Womack, 1973
- Facts of Life (band), American soul/disco band
- "Facts of Life" (Danny Madden song), 1991
- "Facts of Life" (Lime Cordiale song), 2022
- "Facts of Life", a song by King Crimson on the 2003 album The Power to Believe
- "Facts of Life", a song by Lazyboy on the 2004 album Lazyboy TV
- "Facts of Life", a painting by Norman Rockwell
- "Facts of Life" (Not Going Out), a 2019 television episode

== See also ==
- The Facts of Life (disambiguation)
