= Reservoir (Gordi album) =

Studio album by Gordi
- Released: 25 August 2017
- Length: 49:02
- Label: Jagjaguwar

Gordi chronology
Reservoir (2017)	Our Two Skins (2020)

Professional ratings
Aggregate scores
Source	Rating
Metacritic	69/100
Review scores
Source	Rating
AllMusic	3.5/5 stars
PopMatters	7/10

Reservoir is the debut studio album by Australian musician Gordi, released on 25 August 2017 via Jagjaguwar.

At the 2017 J Awards, the album was nominated for Australian Album of the Year.

== Track listing ==
No.	Title	Length
1.	"Long Way"	4:00
2.	"All the Light We Cannot See"	4:17
3.	"On My Side"	4:03
4.	"Bitter End"	5:09
5.	"Heaven I Know"	5:14
6.	"I'm Done"	3:38
7.	"Myriad"	3:22
8.	"Aeon"	5:22
9.	"Can We Work It Out"	4:11
10.	"Better Than Then, Closer to Now"	4:23
11.	"Something Like This"	5:00

== Charts ==
Chart	Peak position
Australian Albums (ARIA)	20
