= Twisting Words =

2020 single by Miiesha

Single by Miiesha

from the album Nyaaringu
- Released: 27 February 2020
- Songwriters: Steven Collins; Mohamed Komba; Miiesha Young
- Producer: Komba

Miiesha singles chronology
"Drowning" (2019)	"Twisting Words" (2020)	"Hold Strong" (2020)

Music video
- "Twisting Words" on YouTube

"Twisting Words" is a song by Australian singer-songwriter Miiesha, released independently on 27 February 2020 as the third single from her debut studio album, Nyaaringu (2020).

According to Young, the song discusses themes of words being twisted to mean something different. She describes the song as her favourite to perform live.

"Twisting Words" received multiple accolades, for Indigenous Song of the Year, Remote Song of the Year and Soul / Funk / R&B Song of the Year at the 2021 Queensland Music Awards, and a nomination for Most Performed R&B / Soul Work at the 2021 APRA Awards.

== Background and release ==
In an interview with Music Feeds discussing her album, Miiesha described the song as her "favourite song to perform live", saying:

"This song is about the way words and the truth can be twisted to mean something different, and how we choose to react to that, do we stand up for the truth or do we stay quiet."

"Twisting Words" was released on 27 February 2020.

== Music video ==
The music video was released alongside the single on 27 February 2020. It was produced and directed by Clare Chapman.

== Awards and nominations ==
=== APRA Awards ===
Year	Nominee / work	Award	Result	Ref.
2021	"Twisting Words"	Most Performed R&B / Soul Work	Nominated	

=== Queensland Music Awards ===
Year	Nominee / work	Award	Result	Ref.
2021	"Twisting Words"	Indigenous Song of the Year	Won	
2021	"Twisting Words"	Remote Song of the Year	Won	
2021	"Twisting Words"	Soul / Funk / R&B Song of the Year	Won	
