= 2020 ARIA Music Awards =

Annual Australian music award

- Date: 25 November 2020
- Venue: Star Event Centre, Sydney, New South Wales
- Hosted by: Delta Goodrem

Highlights
- Most wins: Tame Impala (5)
- Most nominations: Lime Cordiale (8)
- Website: ariaawards.com.au

Television/radio coverage
- Network: Nine Network

The 2020 ARIA Music Awards are the 34th Annual Australian Recording Industry Association Music Awards (generally known as the ARIA Music Awards or simply the ARIAs) and consist of a series of awards, including the 2020 ARIA Artisan Awards, ARIA Hall of Fame Awards, ARIA Fine Arts Awards and the ARIA Awards. The ARIA Awards ceremony occurred on 25 November 2020, with Delta Goodrem as host. However, due to COVID-safe restrictions, it was without an audience and was broadcast from the Star Event Centre, Sydney on the Nine Network around Australia. In place of the usual Red Carpet event, a pre-show was broadcast from The Star's backstage and was hosted by Ash London and Mitch Churi. The pre-show had 16 awards presented ahead of the main ceremony.

The ARIA CEO Dan Rosen had explained to Lars Brandle of Billboard, "There will be an ARIA stage with real people on it, [it] just won't have a live audience in there." Nine Network's Brooke Boney announced the nominees on 13 October via ARIA's YouTube channel with Dean Lewis, Guy Sebastian, and Tones and I appearing. Tame Impala won the most awards with five from seven nominations, Lime Cordiale received the most nominations with eight and Sampa the Great received six nominations, while winning three. Archie Roach was inducted into the ARIA Hall of Fame. During the ceremony he was joined on a stage in Warrnambool by family, friends and collaborators to sing, "Took the Children Away". A tribute performance of "I Am Woman", in memory of 2006 ARIA Hall of Fame inductee, Helen Reddy (1941–2020), was given by an ensemble of female singers backed by a virtual chorus.

Sampa the Great won Best Hip Hop Release for the second year in a row. The category had been created after splitting Best Urban Release into two. Upon her win in the previous year, she was the first female person of colour to win a hip hop award at the ARIAs. However her acceptance speech "about diversity and inclusivity" was not broadcast as the network switched to a commercial. HuffPost's Alicia Vrajlal reported that various artists had criticised "systemic racism" in Australia and its music industry for years. At the 2020 ceremony Sampa the Great performed "Final Form", introduced by her rapping an acceptance speech which included reference to the hurt inflicted by the previous year's ARIA broadcast. Prior to this year's ceremony, Rosen had acknowledged his organisation had handled diverse artists poorly and admitted that "we need to do better."

== Performers ==
2020 ARIA Hall of Fame inductee
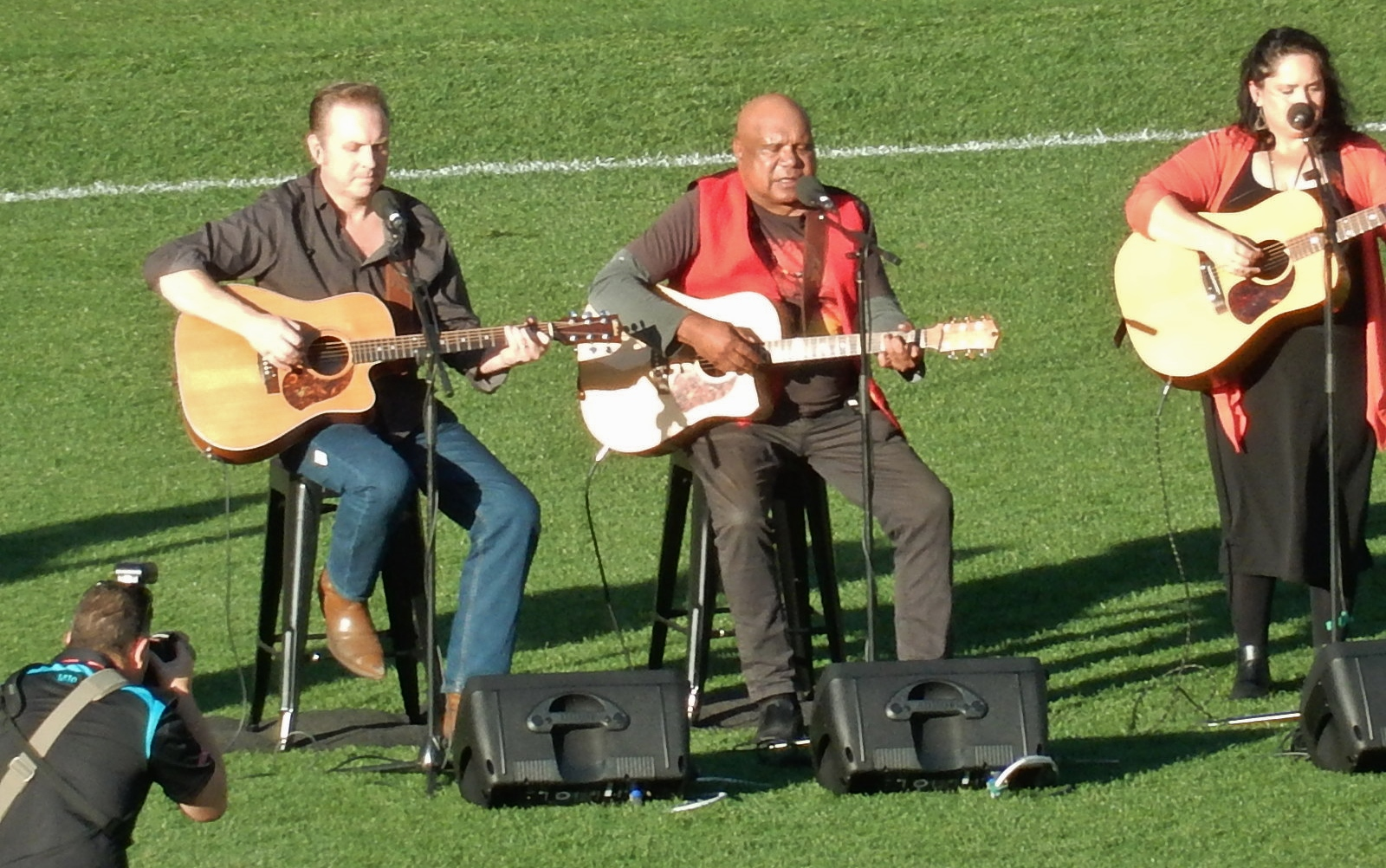
Archie Roach (centre), May 2016

A tribute performance of "I Am Woman", in honour of Helen Reddy, was given by an ensemble of Australian female singers, they were introduced by former Australian Prime Minister, Julia Gillard. The ensemble comprised Amy Shark, Christine Anu, Delta Goodrem, Emma Watkins, Jessica Mauboy, Kate Ceberano, Marcia Hines, Montaigne, the McClymonts and Tones and I. They were backed by a virtual choir of Amy Sheppard, Christie Whelan Browne, Clare Bowen, Dami Im, Emma Donovan, Erika Heynatz, Fanny Lumsden, Graace, Kate Miller-Heidke, Katie Noonan, KLP, Maddy Jane, Missy Higgins, Mo'Ju, Odette, Samantha Jade, Teeny Tiny Stevies, Thandi Phoenix and Wendy Matthews.

Performers for the ARIA Awards ceremony:

Artist(s)	Song(s)	Ref.
Amy Shark	"Everybody Rise"	
Sia	"Together"	
Sampa the Great	"Final Form"	
Lime Cordiale	"Robbery"	
Sam Smith	"Diamonds"	
Archie Roach	"Took the Children Away"	
Billie Eilish	"Therefore I Am"	
Tame Impala	"On Track"	
Ensemble + choir	"I Am Woman"	

== Presenters ==
Delta Goodrem hosted the 2020 ARIA Music Awards main ceremony with the presenters: Briggs, Brooke Boney, Christine Anu, Guy Sebastian, Hamish Blake, INXS, Joel Creasey, Julia Gillard, Kate Ceberano, Keith Urban, Kylie Minogue, Mick Fleetwood, Richard Wilkins, Robbie Williams, Sophie Monk, Tim Minchin, Tones and I, and Tuma Basa & A$AP Ferg. Pre-Show presenters were: Briggs, Anu, Ceberano, Matt Okine & KLP, Mia Rodriguez, Montaigne, Morgan Evans and Nat's What I Reckon.

== ARIA Hall of Fame inductee ==
Upon the announcement of Archie Roach's induction into the ARIA Hall of Fame, the Indigenous Australian musician reflected on changes for local First Nations people during his career. He had released his debut album, Charcoal Lane, in May 1990 and its lead single, "Took the Children Away" (September 1990). He detailed his own experience of the Stolen Generations and addressed the issue of the Australian government's policy, where Indigenous children were forcibly removed from their parents. Roach observed, "When you have written a song and perform a song you just hope people listen to it. I am glad that I was among the first people that opened up about that and began that conversation." He also acknowledged the wider acceptance of Indigenous artists, "I feel more Australian now, I feel more part of the broader community rather than a sub-group or a subculture."

For the virtual ceremony Roach was at the Lighthouse Theatre, Warrnambool (his hometown), where he was joined for his song, "Took the Children Away", by family, friends and collaborators including Paul Grabowsky (piano), Paul Kelly (vocal), Linda Bull (vocal), Jessica Hitchcock (vocal), Steve Magnusson (guitar), Sam Anning (bass guitar), Dave Beck (drums), Erkki Veltheim (violin), and Nola Roach (vocal). Besides his induction Roach won two more awards, Best Male Artist and Best Adult Contemporary Album for Tell Me Why (November 2019).

- Archie Roach

== Nominees and winners ==
=== ARIA Awards ===
Winners indicated in boldface, with other nominees in plain.

Full list of nominees
Album of the Year	Best Group
**Tame Impala – The Slow Rush**; DMA's – The Glow; Jessica Mauboy – Hilda; Lime Cordiale – 14 Steps to a Better You; Sampa the Great – The Return	**Tame Impala – The Slow Rush**; 5 Seconds Of Summer – Calm; DMA's – The Glow; Lime Cordiale – 14 Steps to a Better You; The Teskey Brothers – Live at the Forum
Best Male Artist	Best Female Artist
**Archie Roach – Tell Me Why**; Guy Sebastian – "Standing with You"; Ruel – Free Time; The Kid Laroi – F*ck Love; Troye Sivan – In a Dream	**Sampa the Great – The Return**; Amy Shark – "Everybody Rise"; Miiesha – Nyaaringu; Sia – "Together"; Tones and I – "Bad Child"/"Can't Be Happy All the Time"
Best Adult Contemporary Album	Best Soul/R&B Release
**Archie Roach – Tell Me Why**; Donny Benét – Mr Experience; Gordi – Our Two Skins; Josh Pyke – Rome; Nick Cave and the Bad Seeds – Ghosteen	**Miiesha – Nyaaringu**; Genesis Owusu – "Don't Need You"; Kian - "Every Hour"; Tash Sultana – "Pretty Lady"; Tkay Maidza – Last Year Was Weird, Vol.2
Best Hard Rock/Heavy Metal Album	Best Rock Album
**King Gizzard & the Lizard Wizard – Chunky Shrapnel**; Parkway Drive – Viva the Underdogs; Polaris – The Death of Me; The Amity Affliction – Everyone Loves You... Once You Leave Them; The Chats – High Risk Behaviour	**Tame Impala – The Slow Rush**; Cold Chisel – Blood Moon; DMA's – The Glow; Ocean Alley – Lonely Diamond; Violent Soho – Everything Is A-OK
Best Blues & Roots Album	Best Country Album
**The Teskey Brothers – Live at the Forum**; Busby Marou – The Great Divide; Frank Yamma – Tjukurpa: The Story; Lucky Oceans – Purple Sky (Songs Originally by Hank Williams); Tracy McNeil & the GoodLife – You Be the Lightning	**Fanny Lumsden – Fallow**; Casey Barnes – Town of a Million Dreams; Jasmine Rae – Lion Side; The McClymonts – Mayhem to Madness; Travis Collins – Wreck Me
Best Pop Release	Best Dance Release
**Amy Shark – "Everybody Rise"**; Lime Cordiale – 14 Steps to a Better You; Sia – "Together"; Tame Impala – "Lost in Yesterday"; Troye Sivan – In a Dream	**Dom Dolla – "San Frandisco"**; Alice Ivy – Don't Sleep; Flume - "Rushing Back" featuring Vera Blue; Northeast Party House – "Shelf Life"; Stace Cadet & KLP – "Energy"
Breakthrough Artist	Best Independent Release
**Lime Cordiale – 14 Steps to a Better You**; Alex the Astronaut – The Theory of Absolutely Nothing; Mallrat – Driving Music; Miiesha – Nyaaringu; The Kid Laroi – F*ck Love	**Sampa the Great – The Return**; Archie Roach – Tell Me Why; DMA's – The Glow; Lime Cordiale – 14 Steps to a Better You; Nick Cave and the Bad Seeds – Ghosteen
Best Children's Album	Best Comedy Release
**Teeny Tiny Stevies – Thoughtful Songs for Little People**; Diver City – Welcome to Diver City; The Vegetable Plot – Season Two; The Wiggles – Choo Choo Trains, Propeller Planes & Toot Toot Chugga Chugga Big Red Car!; Tiptoe Giants – Colour the World	**Anne Edmonds – What's Wrong with You**; Bev Killick – Crummy Mummy; Celia Pacquola – All Talk; Megan Washington – "Just Jesus" (featuring Chris Ryan); Tom Gleeson – Joy
Best Hip Hop Release
**Sampa the Great – The Return**; Baker Boy – "Meditjin" featuring JessB; Briggs – Always Was; Illy – "Last Laugh"; The Kid Laroi – F*ck Love

=== Public voted ===
Song of the Year	Best Video
**5 Seconds of Summer - "Teeth"**; Flume - "Rushing Back" featuring Vera Blue; Hilltop Hoods featuring Illy & Ecca Vandal - "Exit Sign"; Lime Cordiale - "Robbery"; Mallrat - "Charlie"; Ruel - "Painkiller"; Sam Fischer - "This City"; The Jungle Giants - "Heavy Hearted"; The Rubens - "Live in Life"; Tones and I - "Never Seen the Rain"	**James Chappell for Guy Sebastian - "Standing with You"**; Gabriel Gasparinatos for Baker Boy - "Meditjin"; Jack Shepherd, Oliver Leimbach, Louis Leimbach, James Jennings, Felix Bornholdt, Nich Polovineo, Adam Haynes for Lime Cordiale - "Robbery"; Imogen Grist, Nick Littlemore for Pnau featuring Vlossom - "Lucky"; Sanjay De Silva for Sampa the Great featuring Krown - "Time's Up"; Kevin Parker for Tame Impala - "Is It True"; Matt Weston for The Chats - "The Clap"; Nick Kozakis, Liam Kelly, Tones and I for Tones and I - "Ur So F**king Cool"; Troye Sivan for Troye Sivan - "Easy"; Dan Graetz for Violent Soho - "Pick It Up Again"
Best Australian Live Act	Best International Artist
**Amy Shark - Amy Shark Regional Tour**; Baker Boy - Falls Festival; Cold Chisel - Blood Moon Tour; DMA's - Unplugged & Intimate, Laneway Festival; King Gizzard & the Lizard Wizard - St Jerome's Laneway Festival; Paul Kelly - Paul Kelly - Making Gravy 2019; Pnau - All of Us Australian Tour; RÜFÜS DU SOL - 2019 Summer Festival Tour; Sampa the Great - The Return Australian Tour 2019; The Teskey Brothers - Run Home Slow	**Harry Styles - Fine Line**; Dua Lipa - Future Nostalgia & Dua Lipa; Eminem - Music to Be Murdered By; Halsey - Manic; Juice Wrld - Legends Never Die; Justin Bieber - Changes; Lewis Capaldi - Divinely Uninspired to a Hellish Extent; Lizzo - Cuz I Love You; Taylor Swift - Folklore; The Weeknd - After Hours
Music Teacher of the Year
**Sarah Donnelley (Wilcannia Central School, Wilcannia, NSW)**; Thomas Fienberg (Evans High School, Blacktown, NSW); Kathryn McLennan (Virginia State School, Virginia, QLD); CJ Shaw (Palmerston District Primary School, Palmerston, ACT)

=== Fine Arts Awards ===
Winners indicated in boldface, with other nominees in plain.

Best Classical Album
- **Richard Tognetti & Erin Helyard – Beethoven & Mozart Violin Sonatas**
  - Alicia Crossley – Muse
  - David Greco & Erin Helyard – Schubert: Die schöne Müllerin
  - Jayson Gillham, Adelaide Symphony Orchestra, Nicholas Carter – Beethoven Piano Concertos
  - Slava & Sharon Grigoryan – Our Place: Duets For Cello And Guitar
Best Jazz Album
- **Paul Kelly & Paul Grabowsky – Please Leave Your Light On**
  - Katie Noonan – The Sweetest Taboo
  - Luke Howard – All That Is Not Solid (Live at Tempo Rubato, Australia / 2020)
  - Mike Nock, Hamish Stuart, Julien Wilson, Jonathan Zwartz – This World
  - Nat Bartsch – Forever More
Best World Music Album
- **Joseph Tawadros – Live at the Sydney Opera House**
  - Grace Barbé – FANM:WOMAN
  - Melbourne Ska Orchestra – Live at the Triffid
  - The Crooked Fiddle Band – Another Subtle Atom Bomb
  - Xylouris White – The Sisypheans
Best Original Soundtrack or Musical Theatre Cast Album
- **Chelsea Cullen – I Am Woman (Original Motion Picture Soundtrack)**
  - Dan Golding – Untitled Goose Game (Original Soundtrack)
  - Grigoryan Brothers – A Boy Called Sailboat
  - Matteo Zingales & Antony Partos – Mystery Road (Original Score: Seasons 1-2)
  - Sally Seltmann & Darren Seltmann – The Letdown (Music from Seasons 1+2)

=== Artisan Awards ===
Winners indicated in boldface, with other nominees in plain.

Producer of the Year
- **Kevin Parker for The Slow Rush – Tame Impala**
  - Kevin Shirley for Blood Moon – Cold Chisel
  - M-Phazes for Free Time – Ruel
  - DNA & Louis Schoorl for Hilda – Jessica Mauboy
  - IAMMXO (aka Mohamed Komba) for Nyaaringu – Miiesha
Engineer of the Year
- **Kevin Parker for The Slow Rush – Tame Impala**
  - Alice Ivy for Don't Sleep – Alice Ivy
  - Greg Wales for Everything Is A-OK – Violent Soho
  - Eric J Dubowsky for Free Time – Ruel
  - IAMMXO (aka Mohamed Komba) for Nyaaringu – Miiesha
Best Cover Art
- **Adam Dal Pozzo, Megan Washington and Michelle Pitiris for Batflowers – Washington**
  - Louis Leimbach for 14 Steps to a Better You – Lime Cordiale
  - Luke Henery for Everything Is A-OK – Violent Soho
  - Made in Katana for Hilda – Jessica Mauboy
  - Tim Rogers for Mr Experience – Donny Benét
