= Apple Crumble (song) =

2021 single by Lime Cordiale and Idris Elba

Single by Lime Cordiale and Idris Elba (Note: Whilst some sources describe the collaboration as featuring Elba, streaming services list him as a lead artist.)

from the EP Cordi Elba
- Released: 24 September 2021
- Recorded: 2021
- Genre: Indie pop
- Label: Chugg Music; 7Wallace Music
- Songwriters: Dave K. Haddad; Oliver Leimbach; Louis Leimbach; Idris Elba
- Producer: Dave K. Haddad

Lime Cordiale singles chronology
"No Plans to Make Plans" (2019)	"Apple Crumble" (2021)	"What's Not to Like" (2021)

Idris Elba singles chronology
"New Breed" (2019)	"Apple Crumble" (2021)	"What's Not to Like" (2021)

Music video
- "Apple Crumble" on YouTube

"Apple Crumble" is a song by Australian alternative rock duo Lime Cordiale and English actor and musician Idris Elba, released through Chugg Music and 7Wallace Music on 23 September 2021 as the lead single from their collaborative extended play, Cordi Elba (2022). "Apple Crumble" was recorded whilst Elba was in Australia filming Thor: Love and Thunder (2022), and was written by Oliver Leimbach, Louis Leimbach, and Elba, alongside the song's producer, Dave K. Haddad.

At the 2022 ARIA Music Awards, the song was nominated for Best Video.

At the APRA Music Awards of 2023, the song was nominated for Most Performed Alternative Work of the Year.

== Background and release ==
In early 2021, Elba was in Australia to film Thor: Love and Thunder (2022), and met Lime Cordiale after being introduced to their music. Following this, the pair invited him into their recording studio to record a guest appearance on one of their songs. The recording sessions resulted in multiple songs being made, which formed a mini-album. On 14 March 2021, Elba joined Lime Cordiale on stage at the Enmore Theatre in Sydney, to rap a new verse during a performance of "Unnecessary Things", a song from the deluxe edition of the latter's second studio album, 14 Steps to a Better You (2020). Following this performance, Chugg Music executive Michael Chugg revealed to the Daily Telegraph that the duo had worked with Elba on new music together.

On 16 September, the duo announced the single and revealed its release date. "Apple Crumble" was released for digital download and streaming on 24 September 2021. Alongside the song's release, they announced the forthcoming release of a collaborative mini-album, titled Cordi Elba.

== Critical reception ==
Tyler Jenke, writing for Rolling Stone Australia, called the collaboration "a bouncy, breezy showcase of their respective talents [that] is pure Lime Cordiale" and labelled Elba's vocals "slick". Scenestr staff writers called the track "a fun ride through jaunty indie pop".

On 22 January 2022, "Apple Crumble" was voted number 14 in Triple J's annual Hottest 100 competition of 2021.

== Commercial performance ==
On 27 September 2021, "Apple Crumble" was added to rotation on Australian youth broadcaster Triple J. On 2 October 2021, the song debuted at number 68 on the Australian Radiomonitor Top 100 Airplay Chart. It subsequently rose 14 places to number 54 the following week, before falling to number 90 in its third week on the chart.

In January 2022, children's band The Wiggles, released their cover version of Apple Crumble which appeared on their album ReWiggled.

== Credits and personnel ==
Adapted from Spotify.

Lime Cordiale

- Oliver Leimbach – writing, performance
- Louis Leimbach – writing, performance

Other musicians

- Idris Elba – writing, performance
- Dave K. Haddad – writing, production

== Charts ==
Chart performance for "Apple Crumble"
Chart (2021)	Peak position
Australia Airplay (Radiomonitor)	54

== Release history ==
Release dates and formats for "Apple Crumble"
Region	Date	Format(s)	Label	Ref.
Various	24 September 2021	Digital download; streaming	Chugg Music; 7Wallace Music	
