= The Facts of Life =

The facts of life, a euphemism used in sex education for the basic facts of puberty, sexual intercourse, and human reproduction, may also refer to:

- The Facts of Life (TV series), a 1979–1988 American sitcom
- The Facts of Life (album), by Black Box Recorder, 2000
- The Facts of Life (film), a 1960 film starring Bob Hope and Lucille Ball
- The Facts of Life (Darlington book), by C. D. Darlington, 1953
- The Facts of Life (Joyce novel), by Graham Joyce, 2002

== See also ==
- Facts of Life (disambiguation)
