= Miiesha =

Indigenous Australian R&B musician

- Born: Miiesha; Woorabinda, Queensland, Australia
- Occupations: Singer; songwriter
- Years active: 2019–present
- Label: EMI Music Australia
- Website: miiesha.com

Miiesha Elizabeth Rose Young, known mononymously as Miiesha, is an Australian singer-songwriter from the Aboriginal community of Woorabinda, Queensland. She was the recipient of New Talent of the Year at the 2020 National Indigenous Music Awards and won the ARIA Award for Best Soul/R&B Release at the 2020 ARIA Music Awards.

== Early life and education ==
Miiesha Elizabeth Rose Young is an Aṉangu/Torres Strait Islander woman from Woorabinda in Queensland.

== Career ==
Miiesha is inspired by the sounds of RnB, gospel and soul, and the power of spoken word poetry.

Mieesha's career was launched after performing as one of the Kulgoodah dancers, who won the Dance Rites competition in Sydney in 2017. The competition had founded by head of Indigenous programming at the Sydney Opera House Rhoda Roberts a few years prior.

=== 2019–2020: Nyaaringu ===
Miiesha made her debut single "Black Privilege" in June 2019. In May 2020, Miiesha released her debut album titled, Nyaaringu; a project of 9 songs tied together through the common themes of her life, her community and her people. Her late Grandmother's interludes provide a thread between the tracks, highlighting the passing down of knowledge from Elders through the generations. Triple J's Unearthed picked up album singles "Black Privilege" and "Drowning". The album peaked at number 28 on the ARIA Charts and won the ARIA Award for Best Soul/R&B Release at the 2020 ARIA Music Awards.

=== 2021-present: Smoke & Mirrors ===
On 14 May 2021, Miiesha released "Damaged", which Miiesha said is her "most personal song yet". It won Song of the Year at the National Indigenous Music Awards 2021.

On 16 July 2021, Miiesha released "Made for Silence".

In September 2021, Miiesha announced a double-EP project titled Smoke & Mirrors, with the first part scheduled for release in November 2021. In a press release, the EPs explore "broken family dynamics, searching for love and healing from two perspectives", with the first centred around "survival" and the second on "looking back and understanding". The single "Still Dream" was released on 4 March 2022 from the forthcoming EP Mirrors. On 3 June 2022, Smoke & Mirrors was released on CD and LP, combining both EPs.

== Discography ==
=== Studio albums ===
Title	Album details	Peak chart positions
Title	Album details	AUS
Nyaaringu	Released: 29 May 2020; Label: Miiesha Young (independent), EMI Australia; Format: CD, LP, digital download, streaming	28

=== Extended plays ===
List of EPs, with release date and label shown
Title	Details
Nyaaringu Remixes	Released: 28 August 2020; Label: Miiesha Young (independent), EMI Australia; Format: Digital download, streaming
Smoke	Released: 19 November 2021; Label: Red Dirt Music; Format: Digital download, streaming
Mirrors	Scheduled: 3 June 2022; Label: Red Dirt Music; Format: Digital download, streaming

=== Singles ===
==== As lead artist ====
List of singles, with year released and album name shown
Title	Year	Album
"Black Privilege"	2019	Nyaaringu
"Drowning"	2019	Nyaaringu
"Twisting Words"	2020	Nyaaringu
"Hold Strong"	2020	Nyaaringu
"Neon Moon" (featuring the Woorabinda Singers)	2020	Deadly Hearts: Walking Together
"Damaged"	2021	Smoke & Mirrors
"Made for Silence"	2021	Smoke & Mirrors
"Price I Paid"	2021	Smoke & Mirrors
"Still Dream"	2022	Smoke & Mirrors
"Everything"	2022	Smoke & Mirrors
"War"	2022	Smoke & Mirrors
"Eventually"	2022	TBA

==== As featured artist ====
List of singles, with year released and album name shown
Title	Year	Album
"Tjitji" (Ziggy Ramo featuring Miiesha)	2020	Deadly Hearts: Walking Together
"Heaven of My Own" (Dallas Woods featuring Miiesha)	2020	Non-album single

==== Other appearances ====
List of other non-single song appearances
Title	Year	Album
"By the Boab Tree"	2023	Faraway Downs (Soundtrack)

== Awards and nominations ==
=== APRA Awards ===
The APRA Awards are several award ceremonies run in Australia by the Australasian Performing Right Association (APRA) to recognise composing and song writing skills, sales and airplay performance by its members annually.

Year	Nominee / work	Award	Result	Ref.
2021	Miiesha Young p.k.a. Miiesha	Breakthrough Songwriter of the Year	Nominated	
2021	"Twisting Words"	Most Performed R&B / Soul Work	Nominated	
2022	"Made for Silence"	Most Performed R&B / Soul Work	Nominated	
2023	"Still Dream"	Most Performed R&B / Soul Work	Won	

=== ARIA Music Awards ===
The ARIA Music Awards is an annual awards ceremony that recognises excellence, innovation, and achievement across all genres of Australian music. As of 2020, Miiesha has received 5 nominations and Best Soul/R&B Release.

Year	Nominee / work	Award	Result	Ref.
2020	Nyaaringu	Best Female Artist	Nominated	
2020	Nyaaringu	Best Soul/R&B Release	Won	
2020	Nyaaringu	Breakthrough Artist	Nominated	
2020	IAMMXO (a.k.a. Mohamed Komba) for Nyaaringu	Producer of the Year	Nominated	
2020	IAMMXO (a.k.a. Mohamed Komba) for Nyaaringu	Engineer of the Year	Nominated	

=== Australian Music Prize ===
The Australian Music Prize (the AMP) is an annual award of $30,000 given to an Australian band or solo artist in recognition of the merit of an album released during the year of award. They commenced in 2005.

Year	Nominee / work	Award	Result	Ref.
2020	Nyaaringu	Album of the Year	Nominated	

=== J Awards ===
The J Awards are an annual series of Australian music awards that were established by the Australian Broadcasting Corporation's youth-focused radio station Triple J. They commenced in 2005.

Year	Nominee / work	Award	Result	Ref.
2020	Nyaaringu	Australian Album of the Year	Nominated	

=== National Indigenous Music Awards ===
The National Indigenous Music Awards recognise excellence, innovation and leadership among Aboriginal and Torres Strait Islander musicians from throughout Australia. They commenced in 2004.

Year	Nominee / work	Award	Result	Ref.
2020	Herself	New Talent of the Year	Won	
2020	Nyaaringu	Album of the Year	Nominated	
2020	"Drowning"	Film Clip of the Year	Nominated	
2021	Herself	Artist of the Year	Nominated	
2021	"Damaged"	Song of the Year	Won	
2022	"Made for Silence"	Song of the Year	Nominated	
2023	Smoke & Mirrors	Album of the Year	Nominated	
2023	"Skin Deep"	Song of the Year	Nominated	

=== National Live Music Awards ===
The National Live Music Awards (NLMAs) are a broad recognition of Australia's diverse live industry, celebrating the success of the Australian live scene. The awards commenced in 2016.

Year	Nominee / work	Award	Result	Ref.
2020	Herself	Queensland Act Voice of the Year	Nominated	

=== Queensland Music Awards ===
The Queensland Music Awards (previously known as Q Song Awards) are annual awards celebrating Queensland, Australia's brightest emerging artists and established legends. They commenced in 2006.

Year	Nominee / work	Award	Result (wins only)	Ref.
2021	"Twisting Words"	Indigenous Award	Won	
2021	"Twisting Words"	Soul / Funk / R&B Award	Won	
2021	"Twisting Words"	Remote Award	Won	
2022	"Made for Silence"	Soul / Funk / R&B Award	Won	
2023	"Still Dream"	Soul / Funk / R&B Award	Won	

=== Rolling Stone Australia Awards ===
The Rolling Stone Australia Awards are awarded annually in January or February by the Australian edition of Rolling Stone magazine for outstanding contributions to popular culture in the previous year.

Year	Nominee / work	Award	Result	Ref.
2021	Miiesha	Best New Artist	Nominated	
