= Enough of the Sweet Talk =

Studio album by Lime Cordiale
- Released: 26 July 2024
- Length: 49:03
- Label: Chugg
- Producer: Dave Hammer

Lime Cordiale chronology
Cordi Elba (2022)	Enough of the Sweet Talk (2024)	Live from the Sydney Opera House (2026)

Singles from Enough of the Sweet Talk
- 1. "Facts of Life" Released: 8 April 2022; 2. "Country Club" Released: 19 July 2022; 3. "Colin" Released: 25 November 2022; 4. "Imposter Syndrome" Released: 15 June 2023; 5. "Pedestal" Released: 24 November 2023; 6. "The Big Reveal; Ou L'Hypocrite" Released: 21 March 2024; 7. "Cold Treatment" Released: 7 June 2024

Enough of the Sweet Talk is the third studio album by Australian indie pop band Lime Cordiale. The album contains 17 tracks and it was released on 26 July 2024. Seven singles preceded the album's release, starting with "Facts of Life" on 8 April 2022. An Australian tour with Australian band Ball Park Music was announced to support the album's release.

At the 2024 ARIA Music Awards, the album was nominated for Best Cover Art.

The album was shorted listed for Best LP/EP at the 2025 Rolling Stone Australia Awards.

== Background ==
The first reports of Lime Cordiale's third album surfaced in late 2022 after the release of "Colin" with the duo stating the album being "70–80% done". The single "Colin" is named after Scottish-Australian musician Colin Hay, who features in the closing chorus of the song. Hay would feature in the accompanying music video of the song with a fraction filmed at his home in Los Angeles.

All the singles released by the duo prior to the album's would be well-recpeted by fans. The three tracks released in 2022 would take out positions on the Australian radio station, Triple J Hottest 100, 2022 list, and the two released in 2023 would feature in the 2023 list.

The album will be supported by the Enough of the Small Talk Tour of Australia throughout 2024, along with Australian band Ball Park Music. This was announced after a mock-feud online of the bass-line in Lime Cordiale's single "Inappropriate Behaviour" bass-line being copied of Ball Park Music's single "Coming Down". However the feud was revealed to be a promotional strategy for the tour, emulating the Drake–Kendrick Lamar feud.

The duo describe the album as "taking us through the course of a relationship in chronological order. The innocent early days, the learning, the love, the doubt, the conflict and the realisation of loss."

== Critical reception ==
Professional ratings
Review scores
Source	Rating
Rolling Stone Australia	5/5 stars
Dork	3/5 stars

Poppy Reid from Rolling Stone Australia said "Enough of the Sweet Talk, with its swaggering groove and mournful rawness, is an exercise in lo-fi power-pop." Reid went on to say "Paired with bouncy guitar melodies, warbly synths and spiralling horn celebrations from the multi-instrumentalists, this record feels like liberation. Lime Cordiale have had their sound honed for some time; but an album that can make you cry-dance in your living room is the ultimate flex."

Finlay Holden from Dork said "It's increasingly clear that they're shooting for something different, something more ambitious." Holden also said "Featuring songs released over two years ago, it's difficult to distinguish a patchwork of material collected over Lime Cordiale's career from a record with a clear direction."

Triple J said "It's a warm, intimate and true-to-form offering that sees the band doing what they do so well – playful instrumentation, cheeky lyrics, and choruses that you can't help but sing along to."

Broadway World said "A headrush of enchanting indie pop and transportive emotional journey, Enough of the Sweet Talk is a tour de force that showcases how much Lime Cordiale both continues to remain tied to their roots and evolve exponentially.

== Track listing ==
Enough of the Sweet Talk track listing
No.	Title	Writer(s)	Length
1.	"Pedestal"	Oliver Leimbach; Louis Leimbach; Dave Hammer; Nick Sarazen; Thomas Aren	4:21
2.	"The Milkman"		3:11
3.	"Cue I"		0:37
4.	"Facts of Life"	O. Leimbach; L. Leimbach; Hammer	4:08
5.	"Enough of the Sweet Talk"		4:00
6.	"Happiness Season"		4:05
7.	"Colin" (featuring Colin Hay)	O. Leimbach; L. Leimbach; M. Wofford	3:39
8.	"Cue II"		0:20
9.	"When I'm Losing It"		2:54
10.	"Imposter Syndrome"	O. Leimbach; L. Leimbach; Bijou Choder; Jonny Pakfar; Shane Eli Abrahams	3:15
11.	"The Big Reveal; Ou L'Hypocrite"	O. Leimbach; L. Leimbach	3:26
12.	"Cue III"		0:15
13.	"Country Club"	O. Leimbach; L. Leimbach; Hammer	3:29
14.	"Cold Treatment"		3:47
15.	"Love Is Off the Table"	O. Leimbach; L. Leimbach; Bijou Choder; Jonny Pakfar; Shane Eli Abrahams	3:44
16.	"Cue IV"		0:14
17.	"Strangers"	O. Leimbach; L. Leimbach; Bijou Choder; Jonny Pakfar; Shane Eli Abrahams	3:38
Total length:			49:03

== Charts ==
=== Weekly charts ===
Weekly chart performance for Enough of the Sweet Talk
Chart (2024)	Peak position
Australian Albums (ARIA)	1
New Zealand Albums (RMNZ)	37

=== Year-end charts ===
Year-end chart performance for Enough of the Sweet Talk
Chart (2024)	Position
Australian Artist Albums (ARIA)	13
Chart (2025)	Position
Australian Artist Albums (ARIA)	31
