= Gordi (musician) =

Australian folktronica musician

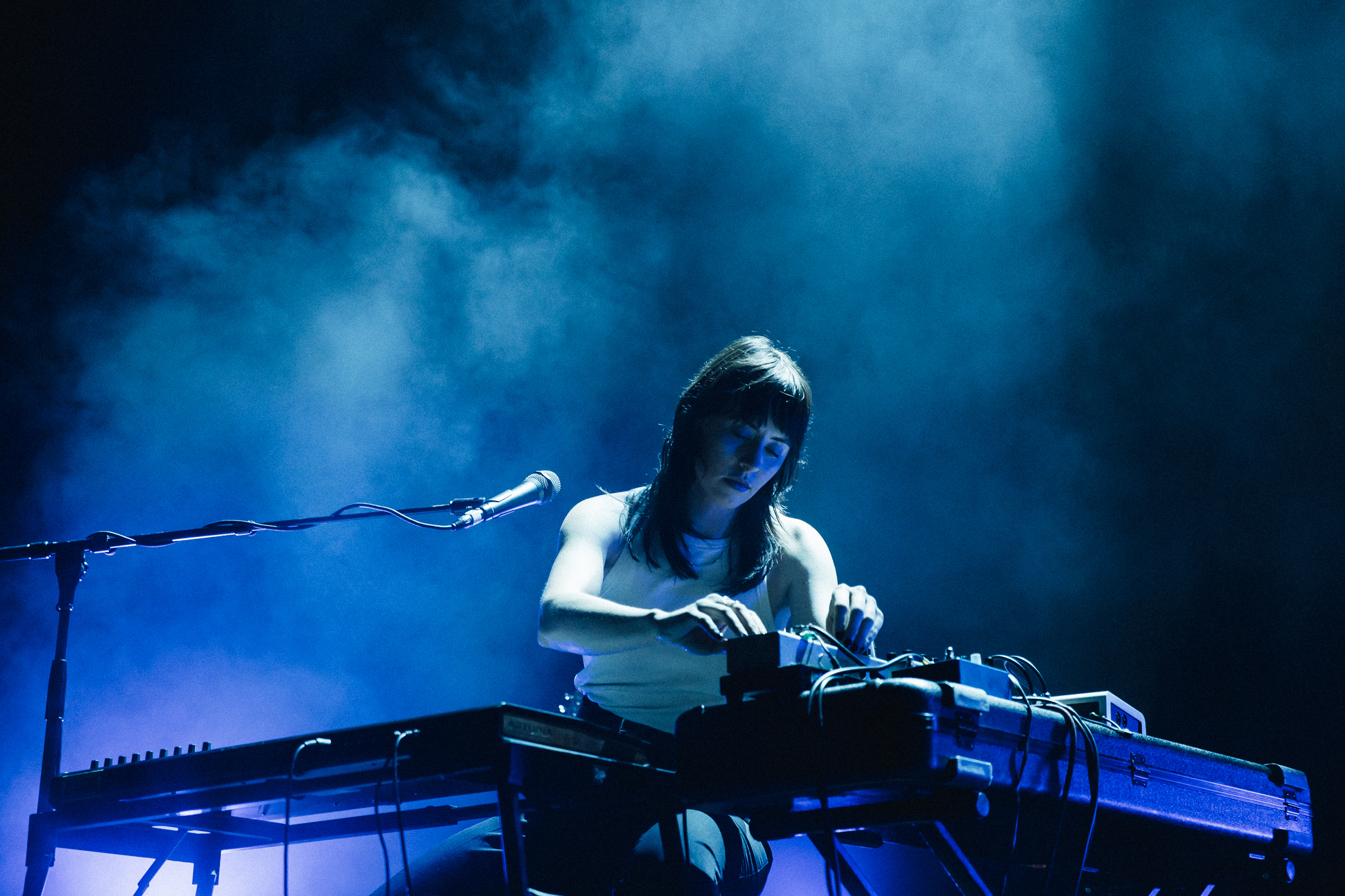
- Gordi supporting Bon Iver at Aware Super Theatre in Sydney, 2023

Background information
- Born: Sophie Payten; 28 December 1992 (age 33); Canowindra, New South Wales, Australia
- Genres: Folktronica; indie pop; acoustic
- Years active: 2013–present
- Labels: Jagjaguwar, Liberation Music
- Website: gordimusic.com

Sophie Payten (born 28 December 1992), known professionally as Gordi, is an Australian folktronica singer/songwriter. Her music has been featured in various television series and films: her 2015 single "Can We Work It Out" featured in the seventh series of The Vampire Diaries, her 2017 single "Heaven I Know" featured in the tenth season of The Walking Dead, and her 2017 song "Something Like This" featured in the 2020 teen romantic comedy To All the Boys: P.S. I Still Love You.

== Career ==
Payten began receiving both national and international attention after playing independently across Sydney whilst at university and releasing tracks online through government-funded national Australian radio station Triple J's Unearthed radio. Payten was nominated for the 2015 Unearthed Artist of the Year J Award from Triple J, the 2015 Next Big Thing SMAC (Sydney Music, Arts & Culture) Award from FBi Radio, and was dubbed one of the 40 best new bands of 2016 by Stereogum. Payten signed record deals with Jagjaguwar in the United States in February 2016 and Liberation Music in Australia in April 2016. Payten then released her debut EP Clever Disguise in May 2016. The EP was written entirely by Payten, collaborating with producers and mixers Ben McCarthy, Alex Somers and Francois Tetaz.

Payten has toured with Bon Iver, Of Monsters and Men, The Tallest Man on Earth, Highasakite, and Ásgeir. Payten also sang backing vocals for Bon Iver on their appearance on The Tonight Show Starring Jimmy Fallon in September 2016.

Payten's debut LP Reservoir, released on 25 August 2017, was co-produced by Payten in part with Alex Somers in his studio in Iceland, Tim Anderson in Los Angeles and Ali Chant in New York City. On the album track "I'm Done", S. Carey is a featured vocalist. Payten is credited with singing backing vocals on S. Carey’s 2018 album Hundred Acres. She is also featured on "Postcard" from Troye Sivan’s 2018 album Bloom.

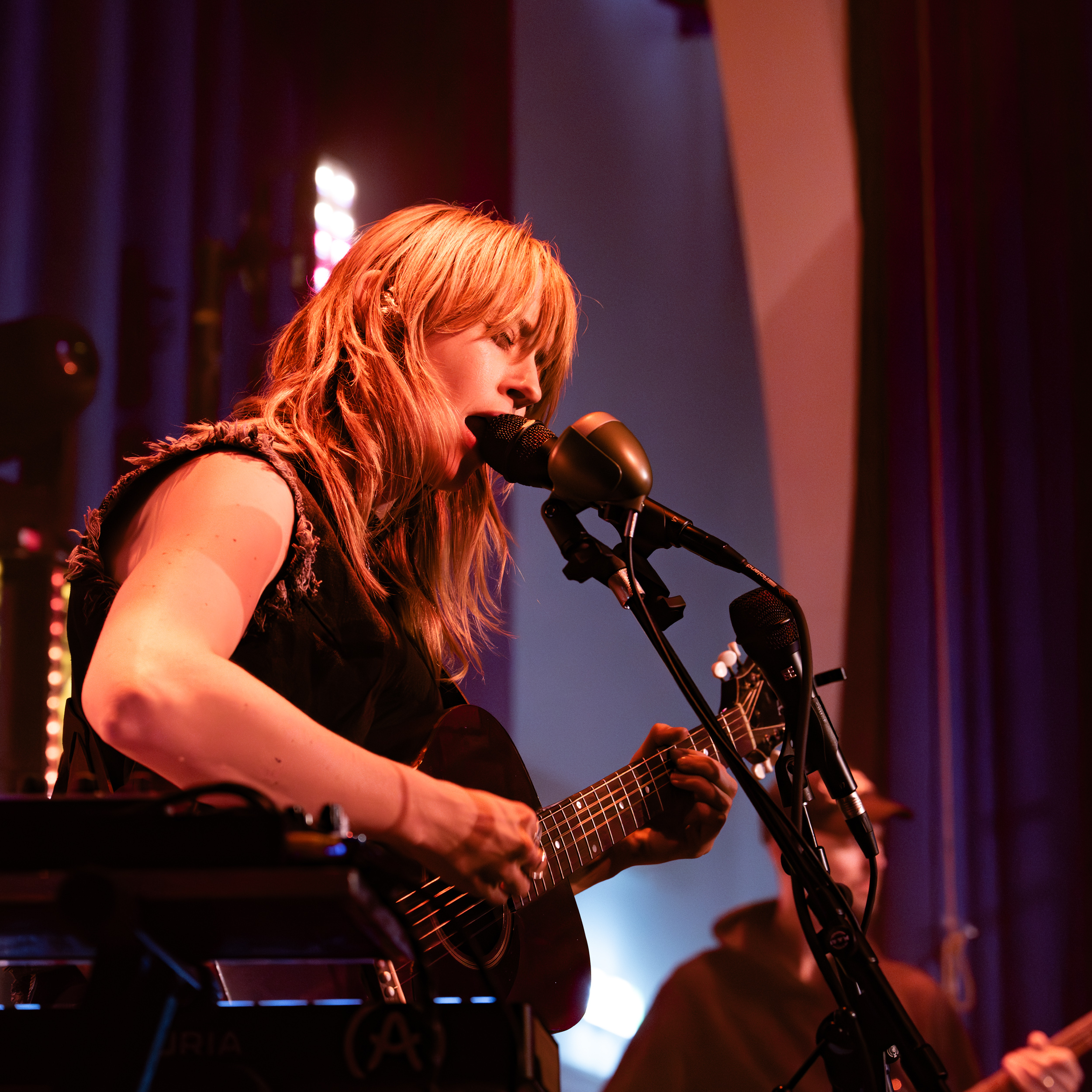
Gordi at The Great Escape Festival 2025

Throughout 2019, Payten worked at Prince of Wales Hospital as a junior doctor, after completing her medical studies at The University of New South Wales in 2018. She quit the position in January 2020 to work on her second studio album, Our Two Skins, but went back on call in the midst of the COVID-19 pandemic.

In January 2020, Payten released her first single in almost three years called "The Cost", with profits going to the 2020 Australian Bushfire Relief. She also released a single "Indifferent" with Willaris. K, which appeared on his EP Lustre.

Payten released five singles ("Sandwiches", "Aeroplane Bathroom", "Volcanic", "Unready", and "Extraordinary Life") ahead of the release of her second studio album Our Two Skins on 26 June 2020. The album, co-produced by Payten with Chris Messina and Zach Hanson, was recorded in a cottage on Payten's family farm in Canowindra.

Payten released her EP Inhuman on 19 August 2022. It was Payten's first non-remix, live, or acoustic EP since the release of Clever Disguise in 2016.

Payten featured on John Raymond and S. Carey's 2023 album Shadowlands, including on the single "Steadfast".

In March 2023, Payten released "Broke Scene", which was co-produced by Ethan Gruska, followed by her single "Lunch At Dune" (with SOAK) in October 2024. Both singles appear on her third studio album Like Plasticine, which was released on 8 August 2025. Singles "Alien Cowboy", "Peripheral Lover", "Cutting Room Floor", "PVC Divide", "GD (Goddamn)" and "Head Rush" also appear on the record.

== Other roles and activities ==
In August 2023, Payten was appointed as one of eight members of the newly-formed Music Australia Council, a division of Creative Australia (formerly Australia Council for the Arts).

== Personal life ==
Payten has been in a relationship with singer-songwriter Alex Lahey since 2017. In 2021 the two released a single, "Dino's", with a music video directed by Nick Mckk.

Payten's 2020 single "Sandwiches" was dedicated to her late grandmother.

== Discography ==
=== Studio albums ===
List of studio albums, with selected details and chart positions shown
Title	Album details	Peak chart positions
Title	Album details	AUS
Reservoir	Released: 25 August 2017; Label: Jagjaguwar; Formats: CD, LP, digital download, streaming	20
Our Two Skins	Released: 26 June 2020; Label: Jagjaguwar; Formats: CD, LP, digital download, streaming	18
Like Plasticine	Released: 8 August 2025; Label: Mushroom Music; Formats: CD, LP, digital download, streaming	93

=== Extended plays ===
List of EPs, with release date and label shown
Title	Details
Clever Disguise	Released: 13 May 2016; Label: Jagjaguwar, Liberation; Formats: CD, LP, digital download
Beneath the Reservoir	Released: 31 January 2019; Label: Jagjaguwar, Liberation; Formats: Digital download, streaming
Refracted: Live at Phoenix Central Park	Released: 20 May 2021; Label: Jagjaguwar, Liberation; Formats: Digital download, streaming
Inhuman	Released: 19 August 2022; Label: Jagjaguwar, Liberation; Formats: Digital download, streaming
Lunch At Dune	Released: 15 November 2024; Label: Mushroom Music; Formats: Digital download, streaming
Nylon	Released: 26 June 2026; Label: Mushroom Music; Formats: LP, digital download, streaming

=== Remix EPs ===
List of remix EPs, with release date and label shown
Title	Details
Can We Work It Out (Reworks)	Released: 7 November 2018; Label: Jagjaguwar, Liberation; Formats: Digital download, streaming
Extraordinary Life	Released: 8 October 2020; Label: Jagjaguwar, Liberation; Formats: Digital download, streaming
Our Two Skins (Remixed)	Released: 27 January 2021; Label: Jagjaguwar, Liberation; Formats: Digital download, streaming

=== Singles ===
==== As lead artist ====
List of singles as lead artist, with year released and album shown
Title	Year	Album
"Nothing's as It Seems"	2014	Clever Disguise (Note: "Can We Work It Out" is also included on the album Reservoir, whilst the RAC remix of "Can We Work It Out" is only included on the remix EP Can We Work It Out (Reworks).)
"Taken Blame"	2015	Clever Disguise
"Can We Work It Out" (original or RAC remix)	2015	Clever Disguise
"Avant Gardener"	2016	Non-album single
"So Here We Are"	2016	Clever Disguise
"00000 Million"	2016	Non-album single
"Heaven I Know"	2017	Reservoir
"On My Side"	2017	Reservoir
"Bitter End"	2017	Reservoir
"The Cost (Australian Bushfire Relief)"	2020	Non-album single
"Indifferent" (with Willaris. K)	2020	Lustre
"Sandwiches"	2020	Our Two Skins
"Aeroplane Bathroom"	2020	Our Two Skins
"Volcanic"	2020	Our Two Skins
"Unready"	2020	Our Two Skins
"Extraordinary Life"	2020	Our Two Skins
"Wrecking Ball" (triple j Like a Version)	2020	Non-album singles
"Dino's" (with Alex Lahey)	2021	Non-album singles
"Grass Is Blue"	2021	Inhuman
"Wait" (with Troye Sivan)	2022	Three Months
"Way I Go"	2022	Inhuman
"Inhuman"	2022	Inhuman
"Stranger"	2022	Inhuman
"Visitor"	2022	Inhuman
"Begin Again" (Gordi remix) (with Didirri)	2022	Non-album singles
"One Crowded Hour / Unready" (live at Sydney Opera House)	2022	Non-album singles
"Broke Scene"	2023	Like Plasticine
"Covered in Chrome"	2023	Mushroom: Fifty Years of Making Noise (Reimagined)
"Apple"	2024	Lunch at Dune
"Lunch at Dune" (with Soak)	2024	Lunch at Dune and Like Plasticine
"Alien Cowboy"	2025	Like Plasticine
"Peripheral Lover"	2025	Like Plasticine
"Cutting Room Floor"	2025	Like Plasticine
"PVC Divide" (featuring Anaïs Mitchell)	2025	Like Plasticine
"GD (Goddamn)"	2025	Like Plasticine
"Head Rush"	2025	Like Plasticine
"Instant Life"	2025	Like Plasticine (Deluxe)
"High Line"	2026	Like Plasticine (Deluxe)
"Forget About Dying"	2026	Nylon

==== As featured artist ====
List of singles as featured artist, with year released and album shown
Title	Year	Album
"The Hummingbird" (Josh Pyke feat. Gordi)	2021	To Find Happiness
"Steadfast" (John Raymond & S. Carey feat. Gordi)	2023	Shadowlands
"Sir" (Slowshift feat. Gordi)	2023	World Going One Way

==== Guest appearances ====
Guest appearances, with year released and album shown
Title	Year	Album
"Postcard" (Troye Sivan feat. Gordi)	2018	Bloom
"Hang On" (Le Youth feat. Gordi)	2022	Reminders
"No One Else" (Nils Hoffmann feat. Gordi)	2022	A Radiant Sign
"New Meaning" (John Raymond & S. Carey feat. Gordi)	2023	Shadowlands
"The Other Side" (Tyne-James Organ feat. Gordi)	2025	The Other Side

== Awards and nominations ==
=== AIR Awards ===
The Australian Independent Record Awards (commonly known informally as AIR Awards) is an annual awards night to recognise, promote and celebrate the success of Australia's Independent Music sector.

Year	Nominee / work	Award	Result	Ref.
2021	"Extraordinary Life"	Independent Song of the Year	Nominated	
2021	Our Two Skins	Best Independent Pop Album or EP	Won	

=== ARIA Music Awards ===
The ARIA Music Awards is an annual awards ceremony that recognises excellence, innovation, and achievement across all genres of Australian music. Gordi has received three nominations.

Year	Nominee / work	Award	Result
2020	Our Two Skins	Best Adult Contemporary Album	Nominated
2023	Sophie Payton (Gordi) & Jason Fernandez for RIDE - Music from the Film	Best Original Soundtrack, Cast or Show Album	Nominated
2025	Like Plasticine	Best Adult Contemporary Album	Nominated

=== Australian Music Prize ===
The Australian Music Prize (the AMP) is an annual award of $30,000 given to an Australian band or solo artist in recognition of the merit of an album released during the year of award.

Year	Nominee / work	Award	Result	Ref.
2020	Our Two Skins	Australian Music Prize	Longlisted	
2025	Like Plasticine	Australian Music Prize	Longlisted	

=== Australian Women in Music Awards ===
The Australian Women in Music Awards is an annual event that celebrates outstanding women in the Australian Music Industry who have made significant and lasting contributions in their chosen field. They commenced in 2018.

Year	Nominee / work	Award	Result	Ref.
2018	Sophie Payten (Gordi)	Songwriter Award	Won	
2018	Sophie Payten (Gordi)	Artistic Excellence Award	Nominated	

=== J Award ===
The J Awards are an annual series of Australian music awards that were established by the Australian Broadcasting Corporation's youth-focused radio station Triple J. They commenced in 2005.

Year	Nominee / work	Award	Result	Ref.
2015	Gordi	Unearthed Artist of the Year	Nominated	
2017	Reservoir	Australian Album of the Year	Nominated	
2020	Our Two Skins	Australian Album of the Year	Nominated	
2020	Gordi	Double J Australian Artist of the Year	Nominated	
2025	Gordi	Double J Artist of the Year	Nominated	

=== Music Victoria Awards ===
The Music Victoria Awards, are an annual awards night celebrating Victorian music. They commenced in 2005.

Year	Nominee / work	Award	Result	Ref.
2021	"Dino's" (with Alex Lahey)	Best Victorian Song	Nominated	

=== Rolling Stone Australia Awards ===
The Rolling Stone Australia Awards are awarded annually in January or February by the Australian edition of Rolling Stone magazine for outstanding contributions to popular culture in the previous year.

Year	Nominee / work	Award	Result	Ref.
2022	Herself	Rolling Stone Readers' Choice Award	Won	
