= Cordi Elba =

EP by Lime Cordiale and Idris Elba
- Released: 14 January 2022
- Length: 21:01
- Labels: Chugg Music, 7Wallace
- Producer: Dave K. Haddad

Lime Cordiale chronology chronology
14 Steps to a Better You (2020)	Cordi Elba (2022)	Enough of the Sweet Talk (2024)

Singles from Cordi Elba
- 1. "Apple Crumble" Released: 24 September 2021; 2. "What's Not to Like" Released: 26 November 2021; 3. "Holy Moley" Released: 14 January 2022; 4. "Unnecessary Things" Released: 27 January 2022

Cordi Elba is a collaborative extended play (EP) by Australian pop rock group Lime Cordiale and English musician and actor Idris Elba. It was announced in September 2021 and released on 14 January 2022.

== Background ==
The album was recorded while Idris Elba was in Sydney shooting for a film earlier in 2021. Lime Cordiale's Oliver Leimbach said, "We wrote everything together. We were all writing lyrics – it wasn't our music or his music, it was smack bang down the middle with every lyric." Elba had teamed up with the band in March 2021, when Elba contributed a rap verse to the band's track "Unnecessary Things" during a Sydney show.

== Reception ==
Zanda Wilson from Music Feeds wrote that "Cordi Elba is a fascinating album in many ways. You get the immediate impression on first listen that the boys really wanted to extract every drop of talent Elba had to offer, with the Brit showcasing his skills at rapping, singing, speak-singing, humming, scatting, and pretty much everything in between."

== Track listing ==
All tracks are written by Dave K. Haddad, Idris Elba, Louis Leimbach and Oliver Leimbach.

Cordi Elba track listing
No.	Title	Length
1.	"Apple Crumble"	3:09
2.	"Holy Moley"	3:51
3.	"What's Not to Like"	3:14
4.	"Ditto"	3:14
5.	"Holiday"	3:43
6.	"Unnecessary Things"	3:50
Total length:		21:01

== Charts ==
Chart performance for Cordi Elba
Chart (2022)	Peak position
Australian Albums (ARIA)	9
