= Hanging Upside Down =

2015 single by Lime Cordiale

Single by Lime Cordiale

from the album Road to Paradise
- Released: 21 January 2015
- Length: 3:51
- Label: Chugg Music
- Songwriters: Oliver Leimbach; Louis Leimbach; Jean-Paul Fung

Lime Cordiale singles chronology
"Sleeping at Your Door" (2013)	"Hanging Upside Down" (2015)	"Feel Alright" (2015)

"Hanging Upside Down" is a song by Australian pop rock duo Lime Cordiale, released on 21 January 2015 as the lead single from their third extended play Road to Paradise.

In 2025, the song was certified gold in Australia.

== Reception ==
Tom Munday from Rotunda Media said "The group's latest track continues their long-standing tradition of Summery surf hits for every generation."

In a review of the extended play in November 2015, Cara Oliveri from Happy Mag said "'Hanging Upside Down' gets the party started. Pouring out their boisterous brand of pop, this tune is dripping in feel-good vibes with its raucous chorus of scorching vocals and roaring piano chords."

== Certifications ==
Region	Certification	Certified units/sales
Australia (ARIA)	Gold	35,000^{‡}
^{‡} Sales+streaming figures based on certification alone.
