= Permanent Vacation (Lime Cordiale album) =

Studio album by Lime Cordiale
- Released: 13 October 2017
- Recorded: 2017
- Genre: Pop; rock
- Length: 36:20
- Label: Chugg Music
- Producer: Dave Hammer

Lime Cordiale chronology
Road to Paradise (2015)	Permanent Vacation (2017)	14 Steps to a Better You (2020)

Singles from Permanent Vacation
- 1. "Temper Temper" Released: 4 August 2017; 2. "Risky Love" Released: 20 September 2017; 3. "Naturally" Released: 10 November 2017

Permanent Vacation is the debut studio album by Australian indie rock duo Lime Cordiale, released on 13 October 2017 through Chugg Music Entertainment.

In an interview with Aus Music Scene, lead vocalist Oliver Leimbach stated "We want people to find their own stories in this music. I hope you and your lover listen to [album track] "Can I Be Your Lover", break up and then that song makes you suffer. We're trying to get inside your head."

== Recording and composition ==
Permanent Vacation is primarily a pop and rock record. The album was recorded throughout 2017 with producer Dave Hammer. The album discusses themes such as the Australian landscape, conservation and sustainability.

== Critical reception ==
In a review of the album, Tanja Brooks Toubro of Tone Deaf said: "The strength of Permanent Vacation doesn't lie in its ability to present as a perfectly cohesive album – because it doesn't – but in the quality of the individual songs" and described the album as a "very varied record".

== Commercial performance ==
Permanent Vacation debuted and peaked at number 79 on the ARIA Albums Chart for the chart dated 23 October 2017, before falling out of the Top 100 the following week.

== Track listing ==
All tracks are written by Louis and Oliver Leimbach.

Permanent Vacation track listing
No.	Title	Writer(s)	Producer(s)	Length
1.	"Naturally"	Louis Leimbach; Oliver Leimbach	Dave Hammer	2:50
2.	"Temper Temper"	L. Leimbach; O. Leimbach Jonathan Pakfar Shane Eli Abrahams Bijou Choder	Hammer	3:28
3.	"Risky Love"	L. Leimbach; O. Leimbach	Hammer	3:23
4.	"Up in the Air"	L. Leimbach; O. Leimbach	Hammer	3:47
5.	"Other Way Round"	L. Leimbach; O. Leimbach	Hammer	3:40
6.	"What Is Growing Up"	L. Leimbach; O. Leimbach	Hammer	2:50
7.	"Is He Your Man"	L. Leimbach; O. Leimbach	Hammer	4:57
8.	"Underground"	L. Leimbach; O. Leimbach	Hammer	4:38
9.	"Giving Yourself Over"	L. Leimbach; O. Leimbach	Hammer	3:54
10.	"Can I Be Your Lover"	L. Leimbach; O. Leimbach	Hammer	3:32
11.	"Walk Over Everything I Do"	L. Leimbach; O. Leimbach	Hammer	4:36
12.	"Reprise"	L. Leimbach; O. Leimbach	Hammer	1:14
13.	"Top of My List"	L. Leimbach; O. Leimbach	Hammer	3:31
Total length:				36:20

== Personnel ==
Adapted from the band's official website.

=== Musicians ===
Lime Cordiale

- Oliver Leimbach – writing, vocals, guitar (1–13)
- Louis Leimbach – vocals, bass guitar, trumpet (1–13)

=== Technical ===
- Dave Hammer – production (1–13)
- Brian Lucey – mastering (1–13)

=== Artwork ===
- Louis Leimbach – cover design

== Charts ==
Chart performance for Permanent Vacation
Chart (2020)	Peak position
Australian Albums (ARIA)	79

== Certifications ==
Region	Certification	Certified units/sales
New Zealand (RMNZ)	Gold	7,500^{‡}
^{‡} Sales+streaming figures based on certification alone.

== Release history ==
Release history and formats for Permanent Vacation
Region	Date	Format	Label	Catalogue	Ref.
Various	13 October 2017	Digital download; streaming	Chugg Music	Not applicable	
Australia	13 October 2017	CD	Chugg Music	CHG017	
Australia	13 October 2017	LP	Chugg Music; MGM	CHG017V	
Australia	22 December 2017	LP	Chugg Music; MGM	CHG017V	
Australia	13 November 2020	2×LP (box set)	Chugg Music	CHG025	
New Zealand	11 December 2020	CD	MGM	CHG017	
New Zealand	11 December 2020	LP	MGM	CHG017V	
New Zealand	8 January 2021	2×LP (box set)	Chugg Music; London Cowboys	CHG025	
