= Dirt Cheap (Lime Cordiale song) =

2018 single by Lime Cordiale

Single by Lime Cordiale

from the album 14 Steps to a Better You
- Released: 2 November 2018
- Length: 2:55
- Label: Chugg Music
- Songwriter(s): Oliver Leimbach; Louis Leimbach; Michael Wofford

Lime Cordiale singles chronology
"Following Fools" (2018)	"Dirt Cheap" (2018)	"Money" (2019)

"Dirt Cheap" is a song by Australian pop rock duo Lime Cordiale, released on 2 November 2018 as the second single from their second studio album 14 Steps to a Better You (2020).

The Joe Brown-directed video was released the same day.

The song was polled at number 86 in Triple J Hottest 100, 2018. In July 2025, the song was certified platinum in Australia.

== Certifications ==
Region	Certification	Certified units/sales
Australia (ARIA)	Platinum	70,000^{‡}
^{‡} Sales+streaming figures based on certification alone.
