= Nyaaringu =

2020 studio album by Miiesha

Studio album by Miiesha
- Released: 29 May 2020
- Studio: Middle Arm and Sunshine Recorder Studios
- Label: Miiesha Young; EMI Australia
- Producer: IAMMXO (aka Mohamed Komba)

Singles from Nyaaringu
- 1. "Black Privilege" Released: 28 June 2019; 2. "Drowning" Released: 9 August 2019; 3. "Twisting Words" Released: 27 February 2020; 4. "Hold Strong" Released: 3 May 2020

Nyaaringu is the debut studio album by Australian singer and songwriter Miiesha, released digitally on 29 May 2020. Following its physical release in August 2020, the album peaked at number 28 on the ARIA charts.

Speaking about the album, Miiesha said "Nyaaringu is a collection of stories that I feel I wanted to tell or that I needed to speak on. For me it represents my journey and where I'm at now coming from Woorabinda. The interludes in the collection are recordings of my Grandmother speaking. For me she was and always will stay with me as the strongest voice in my life, so I felt she had to be a part of this with me." Nyaaringu is a phrase meaning "what happened" in the Pitjantjatjara language.

At the National Indigenous Music Awards 2020, the album was nominated for Album of the Year. At the 2020 ARIA Music Awards it won Best Soul/R&B Release.

== Critical reception ==
Professional ratings
Review scores
| Source | Rating |
|---|---|
| NME | 4/5 stars |
| The Music AU | 4/5 stars |

Ali Shutler from NME said "Nyaaringu [is] a fearless debut album that weaves a story about the Indigenous experience", calling it "A soulful R&B record whose tales of discrimination, empowerment and freedom bear relevance well beyond Australia's borders." The Music AU called the album "thematically and communally, powerful."

Tyler Jenke from ToneDeaf said "Arguably one of the strongest debuts in recent memory, and one of the most fitting records to be released during Reconciliation Week, Nyaaringu sees Miiesha Young sharing her story in the way only she can, with a dazzling blend of smooth soulful vocals serving as a statement of self-belief." Geordie Gray from ToneDeaf called Nyaaringu "essential listening", saying "Miiesha deftly weaves stories of community, survival and inherited knowledge. A pivotal masterpiece and an ode to resilience. A heartbreakingly timely debut."

Laura English from Music Feeds called the album "absolutely stunning but the collection of songs goes deeper, exploring the themes of cultural identity and community."

Al Newstead from Triple J said "Miiesha's debut release is one every Australian should hear... Weaving intensely personal and honest storytelling with the kind of warm production SZA or Solange would kill for, Miiesha captures the complexity of the individual Indigenous experience through universally appealing songs."

Simon Winkler from Stack Magazine said the album "...draws upon gospel, R&B, hip hop, soul and spoken word poetry to create something unique, universal and profoundly personal."

== Track listing ==
| No. | Title | Writer(s) | Length |
|---|---|---|---|
| 1. | "Caged Bird" | Steven Collins; Miiesha Young | 1:34 |
| 2. | "Black Privilege" | Collins; Mohamed Komba; Young | 3:13 |
| 3. | "Drowning" | Collins; Komba; Young | 3:51 |
| 4. | "Broken Tongues" (Interlude by Elizabeth Young) | | 0:50 |
| 5. | "Broken Tongues" | Collins; Komba; Young | 3:17 |
| 6. | "Hold Strong" (Interlude by Elizabeth Young) | | 0:53 |
| 7. | "Hold Strong" | Collins; Komba; Young | 2:54 |
| 8. | "Tjitji" | Collins; Young | 1:27 |
| 9. | "Twisting Words" | Collins; Komba; Young | 3:14 |
| 10. | "Blood Cells" | Collins; Komba; Young | 2:49 |
| 11. | "Self Care" (Interlude by Elizabeth Young) | | 0:48 |
| 12. | "Self Care" | Collins; Komba; Young | 3:30 |
| 13. | "Outro" | Collins; Komba; Young | 1:18 |

== Charts ==
| Chart (2020) | Peak position |
|---|---|
| Australian Albums (ARIA) | 28 |

== Release history ==
| Region | Date | Format | Label | Catalogue |
|---|---|---|---|---|
| Various | 29 May 2020 | Digital download; streaming | EMI Music Australia | — |
| Australia | 28 August 2020 | CD | EMI Music Australia | 0736069 |
| Australia | 30 October 2020 | LP | EMI Music Australia | 0736070 |
