= Waking Up Easy =

2016 single by Lime Cordiale

Single by Lime Cordiale
- Released: 30 September 2016
- Length: 3:56
- Label: Chugg Music
- Songwriters: Oliver Leimbach; Louis Leimbach; Richard Harris

Lime Cordiale singles chronology
"Not That Easy" (2015)	"Waking Up Easy" (2016)	"Temper Temper" (2017)

"Waking Up Easy" is a song by Australian pop rock duo Lime Cordiale, released on 30 September 2016. The duo said "Waking Up Easy' is about a morning after. We wrote it in a day after a big night in Los Angeles. It's about waking up to something that feels unexpectedly right."

In July 2025, the song was certified 2× platinum in Australia.

== Reception ==
AAA Backstage said "'Waking Up Easy' is a little acoustic number filled with enough reverb and sparkly production to bring on those summertime vibes. Perfectly paired with some seriously chilled out and mellow vibes, the song is captures the feeling of waking up after a big night."

== Certifications ==
Region	Certification	Certified units/sales
Australia (ARIA)	2× Platinum	140,000^{‡}
New Zealand (RMNZ)	Platinum	30,000^{‡}
^{‡} Sales+streaming figures based on certification alone.
