= Our Two Skins =

Studio album by Gordi
- Released: 26 July 2020
- Studio: Goodwin's Cottage (Alfalfa, Canowindra, Australia); Funkhaus Berlin (Berlin, Germany); Linear Studios (Sydney, Australia); April Base (Wisconsin, United States)
- Length: 42:30
- Label: Jagjaguwar

Gordi chronology
Reservoir (2017)	Our Two Skins (2020)

Singles from Our Two Skins
- 1. "Sandwiches" Released: 26 February 2020; 2. "Aeroplane Bathroom" Released: 24 March 2020; 3. "Volcanic" Released: 5 May 2020; 4. "Unready" Released: 4 June 2020; 5. "Extraordinary Life" Released: 22 June 2020

Professional ratings
Aggregate scores
Source	Rating
Metacritic	79/100
Review scores
Source	Rating
AllMusic	3.5/5 stars
Beats Per Minute	83%
Exclaim!	7/10
The Line of Best Fit	8.5/10

Our Two Skins is the second studio album by Australian singer-songwriter Gordi, released on 26 June 2020 through Jagjaguwar and Liberation.

It was nominated for Best Adult Contemporary Album at the 2020 ARIA Music Awards. At the AIR Awards of 2021, the album won Best Independent Pop Album or EP.

Three EPs were released following the album's launch, including two remix EPs, Extraordinary Life in October 2020 and Our Two Skins (Remixed) in January 2021, and a live EP, Refracted: Live at Phoenix Central Park in May 2021.

== Singles ==
On 25 February 2020, the first single "Sandwiches" was released. The single is inspired by the loss of Payten's grandmother.

The second single "Aeroplane Bathroom", which was accompanied by the announcement of the new album, was released on 24 March 2020. In a press release, Payten explained the title of the single comes from how she felt "isolated" on an aeroplane and locked herself in the bathroom. The music video for the single, which was directed by Kasimir Burgess, was filmed at an abandoned Aircraft boneyard just outside Bangkok, Thailand.

On 6 May 2020, the third single "Volcanic" was released. The single was written in 2018 in Stockholm, and focuses on Payten struggling with her sexual identity and her parents requesting her to share it with her ailed grandmother. The music video for the single was filmed at her family farm in Canowindra, New South Wales.

"Unready", the fourth single, was released on 9 June 2020.

The fifth single "Extraordinary Life" was released on 23 June 2020, and was filmed in Bangkok at the same time of making "Aeroplane Bathroom". Payten explained the origins of the single: "I began recording the demo in stairwells across Europe while I was on tour with Asgeir and in most of the demo vocals you can hear distant chatter in Icelandic".

== Critical reception ==
Our Two Skins was met with "generally favorable" reviews from critics. At Metacritic, which assigns a weighted average rating out of 100 to reviews from mainstream publications, this release received an average score of 79, based on 7 reviews.

== Track listing ==
Our Two Skins track listing
No.	Title	Length
1.	"Goodwin's" (Intro)	0:19
2.	"Aeroplane Bathroom"	5:44
3.	"Unready"	3:42
4.	"Sandwiches"	3:58
5.	"Volcanic"	3:13
6.	"Radiator"	2:55
7.	"Extraordinary Life"	3:41
8.	"Hate the World"	3:44
9.	"Look Like You"	3:54
10.	"Limits"	3:31
11.	"Free Association"	4:00
12.	"Sandwiches" (A02SK Mix)	3:49

== Personnel ==
Adapted from the album's liner notes.

=== Musicians ===
- Sophie Payten – writing, vocals, instruments (all tracks)
- Zach Hanson – instruments (all tracks)
- Dan Gee – writing (7)
- CJ Camereri – horn (5)
- Slow Moving Clouds – strings (5)

=== Technical ===
- Sophie Payten – producing, mixing, engineering (all tracks)
- Zach Hanson – producing, mixing, engineering (all tracks)
- Chris Messina – producing, mixing, engineering (all tracks)
- Catherine Marks – mixing (2)
- Alex Lahey – engineering (3, 9)
- Heba Kadry – mastering (all tracks)

=== Artwork ===
- Jess Gleeson – photography
- Nathaniel David Utesch – art direction, design

== Charts ==
Chart performance for Our Two Skins
Chart (2020)	Peak position
Australian Albums (ARIA)	18
