= Colin (song) =

2022 single by Lime Cordiale

Single by Lime Cordiale featuring Colin Hay

from the album Enough of the Sweet Talk
- Released: 25 November 2022
- Label: Chugg Music
- Songwriter(s): Oliver Leimbach; Louis Leimbach
- Producer(s): Dave Hammer

Lime Cordiale singles chronology
"Country Club" (2022)	"Colin" (2022)	"Imposter Syndrome" (2023)

"Colin" is a song by Australian alternative rock duo Lime Cordiale featuring Colin Hay, released on 25 November 2022 as the third single from the duo's third studio album, Enough of the Sweet Talk (2024).

The song was voted 34 in the Triple J Hottest 100, 2022.

At the APRA Music Awards of 2024, the song was nominated for Most Performed Alternative Work. At the 2024 Rolling Stone Australia Awards, the song was nominated for Best Single.

== Background ==
Louis Leimbach said Colin Hay "has been an inspiration to us since [our] high school years. His solo acoustic stuff is so bloody stunning." Oliver Leimbach said "During lockdown Colin would go live on Instagram with his guitar. One day I picked up my guitar and played along with him and that afternoon wrote the start of this tune." Oliver added, "It's not about Colin but he started the creation of this song, so we asked him to finish it by singing the final chorus."

== Critical reception ==
Ellie Robinson from NME said "It's one of the band's more ballad-like efforts, with an undulating, folk-influenced melody that's accentuated with soaring violins."
