= Money (Lime Cordiale song) =

2019 single by Lime Cordiale

Single by Lime Cordiale

from the album 14 Steps to a Better You
- Released: 1 February 2019
- Length: 3:58
- Label: Chugg Music
- Songwriters: Oliver Leimbach; Louis Leimbach
- Producer: Dave Hammer

Lime Cordiale singles chronology
"Dirt Cheap" (2018)	"Money" (2019)	"Inappropriate Behaviour" (2019)

Music video
- "Money" on YouTube

"Money" is a song by Australian pop rock duo Lime Cordiale, released on 1 February 2019 as the third single from their second studio album 14 Steps to a Better You (2020).

The song was polled at number 32 in Triple J's Hottest 100 of 2019.

== Background ==
Oliver Leimbach said the track is about how money plays a big role in society and how it can be the source of more issues than solutions.

== Release ==
"Money" was released for digital download and on streaming services on 1 February 2019.

== Credits and personnel ==
=== Song credits ===
Adapted from the parent album's liner notes.

==== Musicians ====
Lime Cordiale

- Oliver Leimbach – vocals, guitar, bass, saxophone, trumpet, flute, clarinet, kazoo
- Louis Leimbach – vocals, guitar, bass, saxophone, trumpet, flute, clarinet, kazoo

Other musicians

- James Jennings – drums
- Felix Bornholdt – keyboards
- Nicholas Polovineo – trombone, trumpet, flugelhorn
- Lachlan Hamilton – saxophone

==== Technical ====
- Dave Hammer – production, mixing
- Brian Lucey at Magic Gardens Mastering – mastering

==== Artwork ====
- Louis Leimbach – artwork creation

== Certifications ==
Region	Certification	Certified units/sales
Australia (ARIA)	2× Platinum	140,000^{‡}
New Zealand (RMNZ)	Gold	15,000^{‡}
^{‡} Sales+streaming figures based on certification alone.
