= Robbery (Lime Cordiale song) =

2019 single by Lime Cordiale

Single by Lime Cordiale

from the album 14 Steps to a Better You
- Released: 20 September 2019
- Length: 3:43
- Label: Chugg Music

Lime Cordiale singles chronology
"Inappropriate Behaviour" (2019)	"Robbery" (2019)	"I Touch Myself (Triple J Like a Version)" (2019)

Music video
- "Robbery" on YouTube

"Robbery" is a song by Australian pop rock duo Lime Cordiale, released on 20 September 2019 as the fifth single from their second studio album 14 Steps to a Better You (2020).

The song was polled at number 7 in the Triple J Hottest 100, 2019.

The music video was nominated for Best Video at the ARIA Music Awards of 2020.

The song was nominated for Most Performed Alternative Work at the APRA Music Awards of 2021.

== Background ==
In an interview, Lime Cordiale member Louis Leimbach said:

"I love the 60s feel to the song. The whole song could just be a baritone sax and a snare and all the main elements would be there. The song all started with that line 'Hey, there's been a robbery'. When you meet someone, even just for a moment, they make an impact and then they're gone. You're left feeling robbed. You feel as though you need to find them somehow but it's no use."

== Release ==
"Robbery" was released for digital download and on streaming services on 20 September 2019.

== Chart performance ==
"Robbery" debuted and peaked at number 63 on the ARIA Singles Chart for the chart dated 3 February 2020, a week after polling at number 7 in Triple J's Hottest 100 of 2019.

"Robbery" was certified 4× Platinum in 2025.

== Music video ==
The music video was directed and produced by Jack Shepherd, Oliver Leimbach, Louis Leimbach, James Jennings, Felix Bornholdt, Nich Polovineo and Adam Haynes.

=== Synopsis ===
The video follows a "broken-hearted" Louis to various landmarks and vistas across Spain, Ireland, France, England, Netherlands, Belgium and Australia as he searches for romance.

== Critical reception ==
Debbie Carr of Triple J called the song a "cute lil ditty" saying the duo "have nailed the art of the impossibly catchy hooks".

== Credits and personnel ==
=== Song credits ===
Adapted from the parent album's liner notes.

==== Musicians ====
Lime Cordiale

- Oliver Leimbach – vocals, guitar, bass, saxophone, trumpet, flute, clarinet, kazoo
- Louis Leimbach – vocals, guitar, bass, saxophone, trumpet, flute, clarinet, kazoo

Other musicians

- Shane Eli Abrahams – writing (Note: Abrahams, Parkfar and Choder are only credited respectively as "S. Abrahams", "J. Parkfar", and "B. Choder" within the album's liner notes, with each of their names credited in full online.)
- Jonathan Parkfar – writing
- Bijou Choder – writing
- James Jennings – drums
- Felix Bornholdt – keyboards
- Nicholas Polovineo – trombone, trumpet, flugelhorn
- Chris O'Dea – baritone saxophone

==== Technical ====
- Dave Hammer – production, mixing
- Brian Lucey at Magic Gardens Mastering – mastering

==== Artwork ====
Adapted from the band's official website.

- Louis Leimbach – cover design

== Charts ==
=== Weekly charts ===
Weekly chart performance for "Robbery"
Chart (2019–2020)	Peak position
Australia (ARIA)	63
New Zealand Hot Singles (RMNZ)	28

=== Year-end charts ===
Year-end chart performance for "Robbery"
Chart (2020)	Position
Australian Artist (ARIA)	16
Chart (2021)	Position
Australian Artist (ARIA)	47

== Certifications ==
Region	Certification	Certified units/sales
Australia (ARIA)	4× Platinum	280,000^{‡}
New Zealand (RMNZ)	Platinum	30,000^{‡}
^{‡} Sales+streaming figures based on certification alone.
