= Temper Temper (Lime Cordiale song) =

2017 single by Lime Cordiale

Single by Lime Cordiale

from the album Permanent Vacation
- Released: 4 August 2017
- Length: 3:28
- Label: Chugg Music
- Songwriters: Oliver Leimbach; Louis Leimbach; Jonathan Pakfar; Shane Eli Abrahams; Bijou Choder
- Producer: Dave Hammer

Lime Cordiale singles chronology
"Waking Up Easy" (2016)	"Temper Temper" (2017)	"Risky Love" (2017)

Music video
- "Temper Temper" on YouTube

"Temper Temper" is a song by Australian pop rock duo Lime Cordiale, released on 4 August 2017 as the lead single from their debut studio album Permanent Vacation (2017).

Oliver Leimbach said "the track is about the kind of relationship that thrive on drama, one that's a bit rough around the edges, but that's why you like it."

== Reception ==
Pilerats said "The track itself is a corker, bringing the vibes that have garnered Lime Cordiale a big fan base over the past few years but also displaying a new level of maturity that bodes incredibly well for the album."

== Certifications ==
Region	Certification	Certified units/sales
Australia (ARIA)	2× Platinum	140,000^{‡}
New Zealand (RMNZ)	Platinum	30,000^{‡}
^{‡} Sales+streaming figures based on certification alone.
