= Inappropriate Behaviour =

2019 single by Lime Cordiale

Single by Lime Cordiale

from the album 14 Steps to a Better You
- Released: 17 May 2019
- Length: 4:13
- Label: Chugg Music
- Songwriters: Oliver Leimbach; Louis Leimbach
- Producer: Dave Hammer

Lime Cordiale singles chronology
"Money" (2019)	"Inappropriate Behaviour" (2019)	"Robbery" (2019)

Music video
- "Inappropriate Behaviour" on YouTube

"Inappropriate Behaviour" is a song by Australian pop rock duo Lime Cordiale, released on 17 May 2019 as the fourth single from their second studio album 14 Steps to a Better You (2020).

The song was polled at number 13 in Triple J's Hottest 100 of 2019. The song was certified gold in Australia in 2020.

== Music video ==
The video was directed by Aimée-Lee X Curran and Jack Sheppard. The band says: "The music video plays on the 'manipulator' line of the song. We wanted this video to show the whole band in the studio but felt we needed the 'manipulator' in there too. You've often gotta hold on to your vision in the studio, as much as others might try to sway your opinions. We really don't keep it together when this 10-year-old shows up and starts telling us what's what."

== Credits and personnel ==
=== Song credits ===
Adapted from the parent album's liner notes.

==== Musicians ====
Lime Cordiale

- Oliver Leimbach – vocals, guitar, bass, saxophone, trumpet, flute, clarinet, kazoo
- Louis Leimbach – vocals, guitar, bass, saxophone, trumpet, flute, clarinet, kazoo

Other musicians

- David Karam Haddad – writing (Note: Haddad is only credited as "D. Haddad" within the album's liner notes, with his name credited in full online.)
- James Jennings – drums
- Felix Bornholdt – keyboards
- Nicholas Polovineo – trombone, trumpet, flugelhorn
- Karen Leimbach – cello
- Lisa Buchanan – violin

==== Technical ====
- Dave Hammer – production, mixing
- Brian Lucey at Magic Gardens Mastering – mastering

==== Artwork ====
Adapted from the band's official website.

- Louis Leimbach – cover design

== Certifications ==
Region	Certification	Certified units/sales
Australia (ARIA)	2× Platinum	140,000^{‡}
New Zealand (RMNZ)	Platinum	30,000^{‡}
^{‡} Sales+streaming figures based on certification alone.
