= 14 Steps to a Better You =

Studio album by Lime Cordiale
- Released: 10 July 2020
- Length: 54:54
- Labels: London Cowboys; Chugg Music
- Producers: Dave Hammer (Note: All tracks); Simon Berckelman (Note: Tracks 1, 3–7, 10, 12–13)

Lime Cordiale chronology
Permanent Vacation (2017)	14 Steps to a Better You (2020)	Cordi Elba (2022)

Singles from 14 Steps to a Better You
- 1. "Following Fools" Released: 28 September 2018; 2. "Dirt Cheap" Released: 2 November 2018; 3. "Money" Released: 1 February 2019; 4. "Inappropriate Behaviour" Released: 17 May 2019; 5. "Robbery" Released: 20 September 2019; 6. "Addicted to the Sunshine" Released: 31 January 2020; 7. "On Our Own" Released: 17 April 2020; 8. "Screw Loose" Released: 3 July 2020; 9. "No Plans to Make Plans" Released: 30 April 2021

Singles from 14 Steps to a Better You (Relapse)
- 1. "Reality Check Please" Released: 29 October 2020; 2. "Ticks Me Off" Released: 22 January 2021

14 Steps to a Better You is the second studio album by Australian indie pop band Lime Cordiale, released on 10 July 2020 through Chugg Music Entertainment.

At the 2020 J Awards in November 2020, the album won Australian Album of the Year.

At the 2020 ARIA Music Awards, the album received six nominations, including for Album of the Year, and for Breakthrough Artist – Release, which it won.

At the AIR Awards of 2021, the album was nominated for Best Independent Rock Album or EP.

The album was re-released on 13 November 2020, with six new tracks.

== Background ==
Band member Oliver Leimbach told Stack Magazine:

"One of the major messages of this album [is] sort of not to take yourself too seriously. Do the things you love to do, but also, don't leave this world without making a good, positive effect. It's like this contradictory message... [which] I think fits well with a song like 'No Plans' that sounds so silly. But the song is talking to someone that's money-driven, and power-driven, and thinking about themselves. The silliness is a bit cheeky, and taking the piss out of that character."

== Critical reception ==
Professional ratings
Review scores
Source	Rating
Gigwise	6/10 stars
NME	4/5 stars

Sose Fuamoli from Triple J called the album "a defining musical statement" Fuamoli said "It's Lime Cordiale, summarised in 14 tracks. It incorporates the spirit of fun that's driven [their] work to date, but sees them develop their songwriting in depth and nuance. Oli and Louis have always been self-aware when it comes to their lyricism - but here they've taken it up an extra notch."

Ali Shutler from NME said "14 Steps to a Better You never lets go of the beating heart that's made relatable stars of Lime Cordiale."

== Track listing ==
14 Steps to a Better You track listing
No.	Title	Writer(s)	Length
1.	"That's Life"	Oliver Leimbach; Louis Leimbach	3:25
2.	"Robbery"	O. Leimbach; L. Leimbach; S. Abrahams; J. Pakfar; B. Choder	3:43
3.	"No Plans to Make Plans"	O. Leimbach; L. Leimbach	4:18
4.	"Inappropriate Behaviour"	O. Leimbach; L. Leimbach; D. Haddad	4:13
5.	"Addicted to the Sunshine"	O. Leimbach; L. Leimbach	4:30
6.	"On Our Own"	O. Leimbach; L. Leimbach; M. Wofford; Haddad	3:36
7.	"We Just Get By"	O. Leimbach; L. Leimbach; F. Bornholdt	4:04
8.	"Money"	O. Leimbach; L. Leimbach	3:58
9.	"Screw Loose"	O. Leimbach; L. Leimbach	4:14
10.	"Elephant in the Room"	O. Leimbach; L. Leimbach; Haddad	3:52
11.	"Dirt Cheap"	O. Leimbach; L. Leimbach; Wofford	2:55
12.	"Can't Take All the Blame"	O. Leimbach; L. Leimbach	3:59
13.	"Dear London"	O. Leimbach; L. Leimbach	4:03
14.	"Following Fools"	O. Leimbach; L. Leimbach; A. Dawson; Haddad	4:09
Total length:			54:54

14 Steps to a Better You (Relapse) track listing
No.	Title	Writer(s)	Length
1.	"That's Life"	Oliver Leimbach; Louis Leimbach	3:25
2.	"Unnecessary Things"	O. Leimbach; L. Leimbach	3:36
3.	"Robbery"	O. Leimbach; L. Leimbach; S. Abrahams; J. Pakfar; B. Choder	3:43
4.	"No Plans to Make Plans"	O. Leimbach; L. Leimbach	4:18
5.	"Still Vulnerable"	O. Leimbach; L. Leimbach	4:03
6.	"Inappropriate Behaviour"	O. Leimbach; L. Leimbach; D. Haddad	4:13
7.	"Addicted to the Sunshine"	O. Leimbach; L. Leimbach	4:30
8.	"Dignity"	O. Leimbach; L. Leimbach	3:41
9.	"On Our Own"	O. Leimbach; L. Leimbach; M. Wofford; Haddad	3:36
10.	"We Just Get By"	O. Leimbach; L. Leimbach; F. Bornholdt	4:04
11.	"Reality Check Please"	O. Leimbach; L. Leimbach	3:40
12.	"Money"	O. Leimbach; L. Leimbach	3:58
13.	"Screw Loose"	O. Leimbach; L. Leimbach	4:14
14.	"Popeye Had Spinach"	O. Leimbach; L. Leimbach	2:50
15.	"Elephant in the Room"	O. Leimbach; L. Leimbach; Haddad	3:52
16.	"Dirt Cheap"	O. Leimbach; L. Leimbach; Wofford	2:55
17.	"Ticks Me Off"	O. Leimbach; L. Leimbach	3:35
18.	"Can't Take All the Blame"	O. Leimbach; L. Leimbach	3:59
19.	"Dear London"	O. Leimbach; L. Leimbach	4:03
20.	"Following Fools"	O. Leimbach; L. Leimbach; A. Dawson; Haddad	4:09

== Personnel ==
Adapted from the album's liner notes.

=== Musicians ===
Lime Cordiale

- Oliver Leimbach – vocals, guitar, bass, saxophone, trumpet, flute, clarinet, kazoo (1–20)
- Louis Leimbach – vocals, guitar, bass, saxophone, trumpet, flute, clarinet, kazoo (1–20)

Other musicians

- S. Abrahams – writing (2)
- J. Parkfar – writing (2)
- B. Choder – writing (2)
- D. Haddad – writing (4, 6, 10, 14)
- M. Wofford – writing (6, 11)
- A. Dawson – writing (14)
- James Jennings – drums (1–20)
- Felix Bornholdt – keyboards (1–20), writing (7)
- Nicholas Polovineo – trombone, trumpet, flugelhorn (1–20)
- Chris O'Dea – baritone saxophone (2, 14)
- Lachlan Hamilton – saxophone (6, 8–9)
- Karen Leimbach – cello (4, 10, 12)
- Lisa Buchanan – violin (4, 10, 12)

=== Technical ===
- Dave Hammer – production, mixing (1–20)
- Brian Lucey at Magic Gardens Mastering – mastering (1–20)
- Simon Berckelman – production (1, 3–7, 10, 12–13)

=== Artwork ===
- Louis Leimbach – artwork creation

== Charts ==
=== Weekly charts ===
Weekly chart performance for 14 Steps to a Better You
Chart (2020)	Peak position
Australian Albums (ARIA)	1
New Zealand Albums (RMNZ)	32

=== Year-end charts ===
2020 year-end chart performance for 14 Steps to a Better You
Chart (2020)	Position
Australian Albums (ARIA)	31

2021 year-end chart performance for 14 Steps to a Better You
Chart (2021)	Position
Australian Albums (ARIA)	46

== Certifications ==
Region	Certification	Certified units/sales
Australia (ARIA)	Platinum	70,000^{‡}
New Zealand (RMNZ)	Gold	7,500^{‡}
^{‡} Sales+streaming figures based on certification alone.

== Release history ==
Release history and details for 14 Steps to a Better You
Region	Date	Format	Edition	Label	Catalogue	Ref.
Various	10 July 2020	Digital download; streaming	Standard	Chugg Music	Not applicable	
Australia	10 July 2020	CD	Standard	Chugg Music	CHG020	
Australia	10 July 2020	LP	Standard	Chugg Music	CHGV020	
New Zealand	14 August 2020	CD	Standard	Chugg Music	CHG020	
New Zealand	14 August 2020	LP	Standard	Chugg Music	CHGV020	
Various	13 November 2020	Digital download; streaming	Relapse (Deluxe)	Chugg Music	Not applicable	
Australia	13 November 2020	2×LP (box set)	Relapse (Deluxe)	Chugg Music	CHG025	
New Zealand	8 January 2021	2×LP (box set)	Relapse (Deluxe)	Chugg Music	CHG025	

== See also ==
- List of number-one albums of 2020 (Australia)
