= Lime Cordiale =

Australian pop rock duo

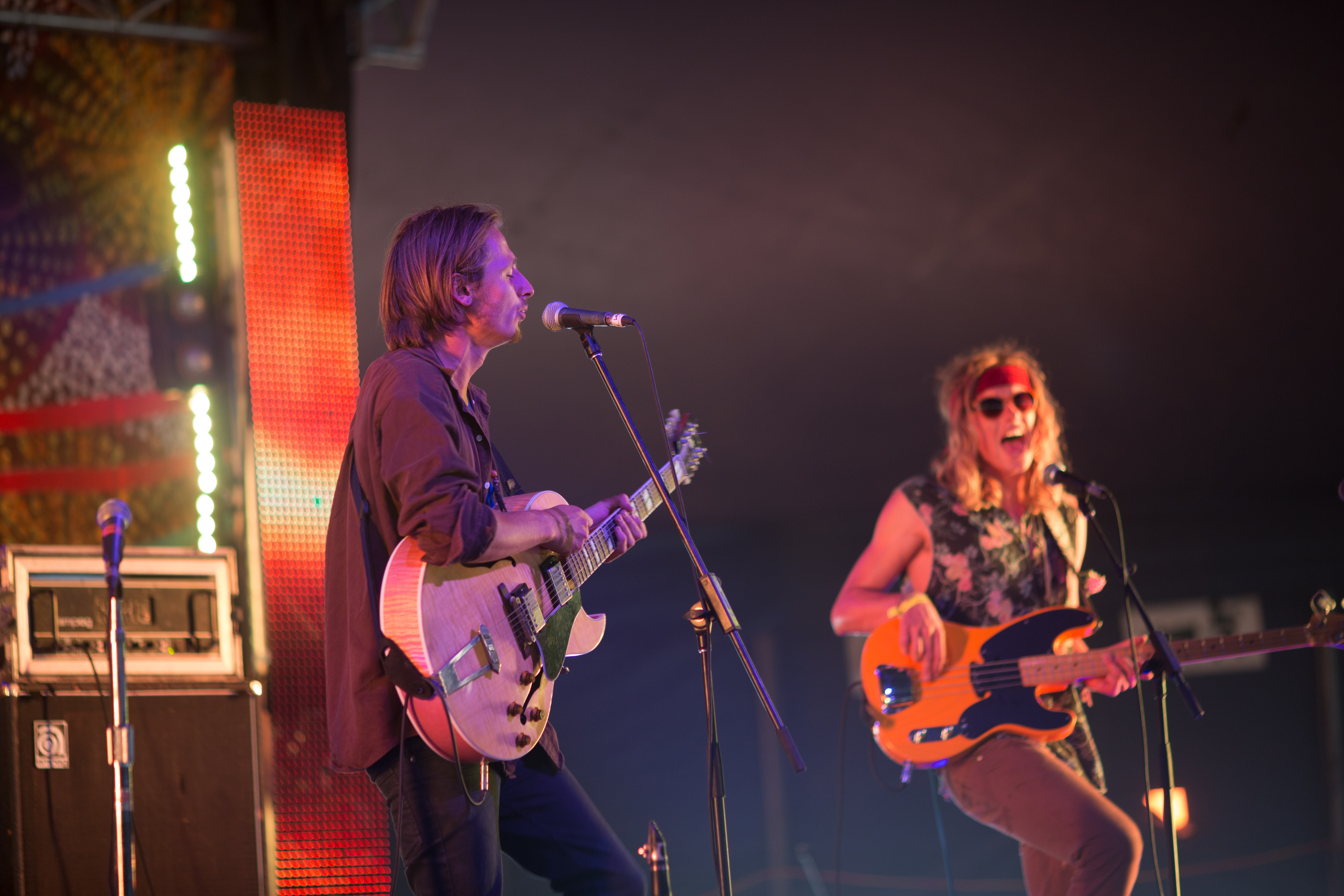
- Lime Cordiale performing at Peats Ridge Festival in 2012.

Background information
- Origin: Sydney, New South Wales, Australia
- Genres: Pop rock; surf rock; alternative pop
- Years active: 2009–present
- Labels: Independent/MGM, Chugg/MGM
- Members: Louis Leimbach; Oliver Leimbach
- Website: limecordiale.com

Lime Cordiale are an Australian pop rock group formed in 2009. It consists of brothers Oliver and Louis Leimbach, with additional members Alex Weybury, Jack Howe and Luke DiDio. They released their debut studio album Permanent Vacation in 2017. The group have performed at Groovin' the Moo and South by Southwest (SXSW). At the 2020 ARIA Music Awards they were nominated in eight categories and won Breakthrough Artist – Release for their second album, 14 Steps to a Better You (July 2020).

== Career ==
=== 2009–2016: Early extended plays ===
Lime Cordiale formed in Sydney in September 2009 as a duo by the brothers Louis Stanley Leimbach on bass guitar, trumpet, vocals and kazoo and Oliver Jay "Oli" Leimbach on guitar, clarinet and vocals. After spotting the duo at a band competition, Icehouse frontman, Iva Davies offered them a mentoring partnership and they recorded some tracks. In 2011 Lime Cordiale supported Icehouse on their tour. Also in that year the duo released three singles via Bandcamp and played over 60 live shows. By June 2012 they were joined by Brendan Champion on trombone and James Jennings on drums. The group centres around the Leimbach brothers who recognised their mutual love of all things pop and their desire to create original and exciting music.

In July 2012 Lime Cordiale independently released their five-track debut extended play Faceless Cat, including the single "Pretty Girl", which was distributed by MGM. Larry Heath of The AU Review saw the group performing that track and felt it has "a good dose of clarinet to mix in with their signature blend of pop, rock, jazz" and other genres.

Lime Cordiale's second five-track EP Falling Up the Stairs (September 2013) was issued via Chugg Music/MGM Distribution, which was produced by Daniel Denholm and provided two singles "Bullshit Aside" and "Sleeping at Your Door". For the EP they were a five-piece of Champion, Jennings, the Leimbach brothers and Tim Fitz on guitar and keyboards. During 2015 they released three more singles and in November their third EP Road to Paradise with six tracks appeared. Forté's Rex Miller observed, "bass is heavy and the melodies are strong and give choruses that are best sung at the top of your lungs."

=== 2017–2019: Permanent Vacation and 14 Steps to a Better You ===
In August 2017 Lime Cordiale released "Temper Temper", the lead single from their debut studio album Permanent Vacation, which followed in October. It was produced by Dave Hammer (Thundamentals, Nicole Millar, Washington) with the same five-piece line-up as on Road to Paradise. Nathan Marino of Music Insight rated it at 8.5 and praised their "danceable numbers" and "thought-provoking ballads".The Brag's Tanja Brinks Toubro gave it four-out-of-five stars and highlighted the "playfulness" and "quality of the individual songs".

Permanent Vacation peaked at No. 79 on the ARIA albums chart; while on related component album charts it reached No. 42 on Top 100 physical, No. 15 on Australian artists and No. 3 on hitseekers. To promote the album they undertook at 16-date national tour from October to December with an expanded band line-up. The album provided two more singles, "Risky Love" (September) and "Naturally" (December).

During 2018 the group started working on their second studio album, 14 Steps to a Better You, which eventually appeared in July 2020. In January 2019 its second single "Dirt Cheap" (November 2018) was placed 86th on the Triple J Hottest 100, 2018. They released its third single "Money" in February 2019. In May of that year its fourth single "Inappropriate Behaviour" premiered on Triple J. The album's fifth single "Robbery" (September), a song about "chasing after a girl who has stolen your heart", reached the ARIA singles chart top 100. They undertook a national tour in support of its release. In January 2020 they had four tracks in the Triple J Hottest 100, 2019, with "Robbery" highest placed at number 7.

After its release 14 Steps to a Better You peaked at number 1 on the ARIA albums chart and number 32 on Official New Zealand Music Chart. Ali Shutler of NME Australia compared it to their debut album, "it's more refined, more considered but still inspires excitement at every starry-eyed turn."

=== 2021–present: Cordi Elba and Enough of the Sweet Talk ===
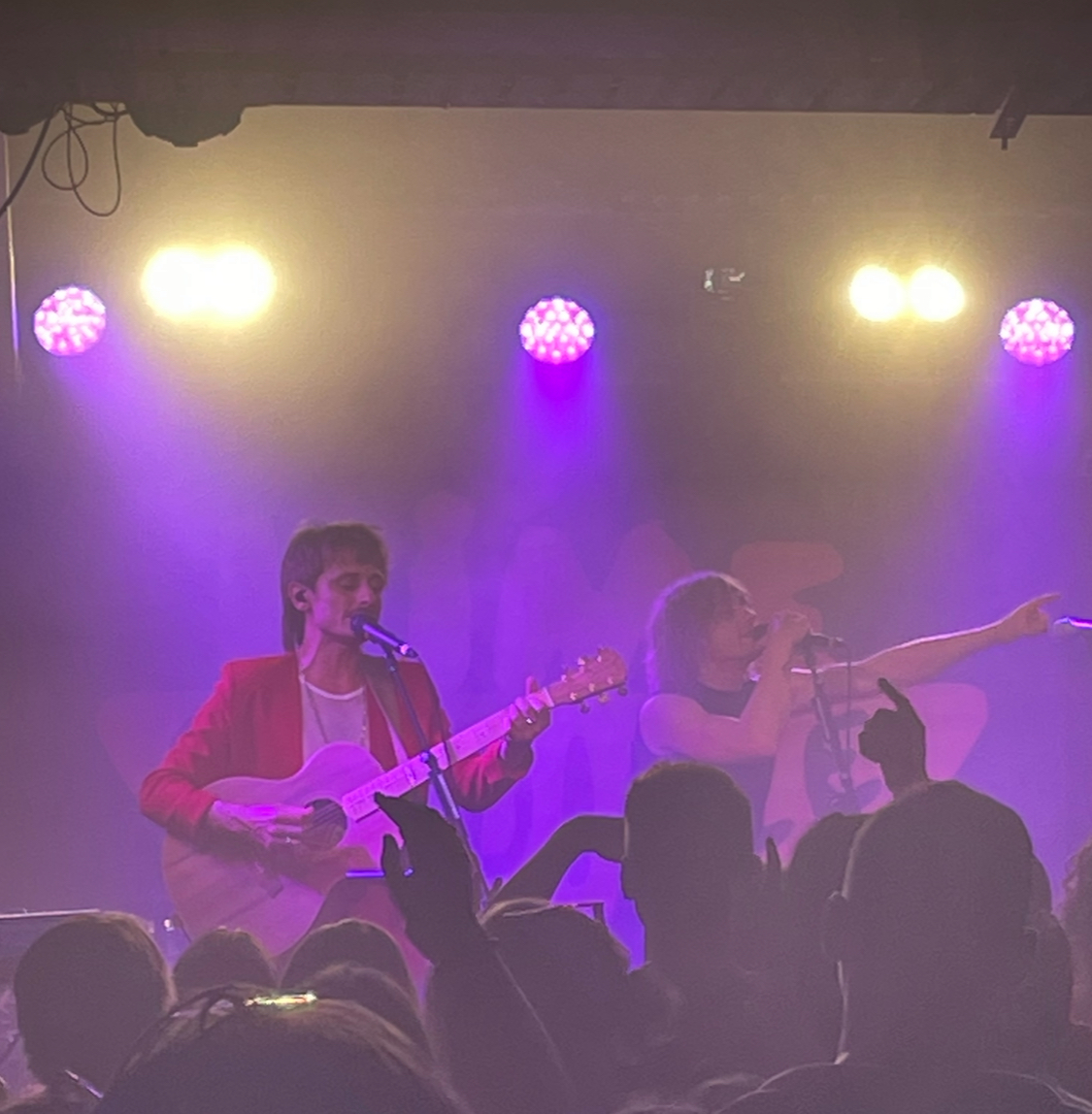
Lime Cordiale performing at Torquay Hotel in 2023

In September 2021 Lime Cordiale released the single "Apple Crumble", which is the lead track from a collaborative six track EP, Cordi Elba, with English actor-musician Idris Elba. The EP was released on 14 January 2022 and peaked at number 9 on the ARIA charts. On 8 April 2022 the pop rock group released a new single, "Facts of Life" and in July they followed with "Country Club".

In late 2022 Lime Cordiale announced that they were working on their third studio album and it was "70-80% done". There has yet to be a timeframe announced for the release nor the track listing the album will feature.

On 25 November 2022, the group released the single "Colin" which featured vocals from Scottish-Australian artist Colin Hay, lead singer of the Australian rock band Men at Work. An accompanying music video for the song had scenes shot at Hay's home and where the final chorus of the song was recorded.

On 15 June 2023, Lime Cordiale released "Imposter Syndrome", their first single of 2023. Following the release of the single the group collaborated with Filipino-Australian artist Grentperez on a single titled "Op Shop Lover" released on 28 September 2023. The group finished out there year with releasing a single "Pedestal" on 23 November 2023. Both of their solo projects placed on the Triple J Hottest 100 2023 countdown at #27 and #42 respectfully.

During Late 2023 Oli and Louis released their carbon-neutral beer "LARGO". The branding for the beer is said to be an acronym for 'late afternoon glass off'.

On 22 March 2024, Lime Cordiale released "The Big Reveal: Au L'Hypocrite".

On 4 June 2024 the duo released a new single titled "Cold Treatment" along with the announcement of their upcoming third studio album Enough of the Sweet Talk. The album includes many of the singles released over the past 2 years. The duo will tour Australia throughout 2024 alongside Australian band Ball Park Music to support the album.

On 21 June 2024, long-time touring members Nick Polovineo and Felix Bornholdt both announced they would be moving on from the band via Instagram.

On 26 July 2024, Lime Cordiale released Enough of the Sweet Talk, their third studio album. The Leimbach brothers describe the album as "taking us through the course of a relationship in chronological order. The innocent early days, the learning, the love, the doubt, the conflict and the realisation of loss."

After its release, Enough of the Sweet Talk peaked at number 1 on the ARIA album charts.

In September 2025, Lime Cordiale performed with Melbourne Symphony Orchestra.

== Personal life ==
Oli and Louis' father was film producer Bill Leimbach who has worked on Australian films and television shows such as Beneath Hill 60.

== Band members ==
Current members

- Louis Leimbach – bass guitar, trumpet, vocals, kazoo
- Oli Leimbach – guitar, clarinet, vocals

Touring members

- Luke Didio – drums
- Alex Weybury – keyboards
- Jack Howe – guitar
- Jackson McIvor

Former members

- Brendan Champion – trombone
- Tim Fitz – guitar, keyboards
- Felix Bornholdt – keyboards
- Nick Polovineo – trombone, guitar
- James Jennings - drums

== Discography ==
- Permanent Vacation (2017)
- 14 Steps to a Better You (2020)
- Enough of the Sweet Talk (2024)

== Awards and nominations ==
=== AIR Awards ===
The Australian Independent Record Awards (commonly known informally as AIR Awards) is an annual awards night to recognise, promote and celebrate the success of Australia's Independent Music sector.

Year	Nominee / work	Award	Result	Ref.
2021	14 Steps to a Better You	Best Independent Rock Album or EP	Nominated	
2023	"Holiday" (Fatboy Slim Remix) (with Idris Elba)	Best Independent Dance, Electronica or Club Single	Nominated	
2023	Chugg Music, The Annex: Lime Cordiale – Cordi Elba	Independent Marketing Team of the Year	Nominated	
2023	Independent Publicity Team of the Year	Positive Feedback: Lime Cordiale – Cordi Elba	Nominated	

=== APRA Awards ===
The APRA Awards are several award ceremonies run in Australia by the Australasian Performing Right Association (APRA) to recognise composing and song writing skills, sales and airplay performance by its members annually.

Year	Nominee / work	Award	Result	Ref.
2021	Louis Leimback, Oli Leimback (of Lime Cordiale)	Breakthrough Songwriter of the Year	Nominated	
2021	"Robbery" (Louis Leimbach, Oli Leimbach, Shane Abrahams, Daniel Choder, Jonathan Pakfar)	Most Performed Alternative Work	Nominated	
2021	"On Our Own" (Louis Leimbach, Oliver Leimbach, David Haddad, Michael Wofford)	Song of the Year	Shortlisted	
2022	"Reality Check Please" (Louis Leimbach, Oliver Leimbach, David Haddad)	Most Performed Alternate Work of the Year	Nominated	
2022	"Reality Check Please" (Louis Leimbach, Oliver Leimbach, David Haddad)	Song of the Year	Shortlisted	
2023	"Apple Crumble" (Louis Leimbach, Oliver Leimbach, Dave Hammer, Idris Elba)	Most Performed Alternate Work of the Year	Nominated	
2024	"Colin" (Louis Leimbach, Oli Leimbach)	Most Performed Alternative Work	Nominated	
2025	"Pedestal" (Louis Leimbach, Oli Leimbach, Felix Bornholdt, Dave Hammer, Thomas McDonald, Nick Sarazen)	Most Performed Alternative Work	Nominated	

=== ARIA Music Awards ===
The ARIA Music Awards are an annual awards ceremony that recognises excellence, innovation, and achievement across all genres of Australian music. In 2020, Lime Cordiale were nominated for 8 awards, winning one.

Year	Nominee / work	Award	Result	Ref.
2020	14 Steps to a Better You	Album of the Year	Nominated	
2020	14 Steps to a Better You	Best Group	Nominated	
2020	14 Steps to a Better You	Breakthrough Artist	Won	
2020	14 Steps to a Better You	Best Independent Release	Nominated	
2020	14 Steps to a Better You	Best Pop Release	Nominated	
2020	"Robbery"	Song of the Year	Nominated	
2020	"Robbery"	Best Video	Nominated	
2020	Louis Leimbach for 14 Steps to a Better You	Best Cover Art	Nominated	
2021	Lime Cordiale – Relapse Tour	Best Australian Live Act	Won	
2022	"Apple Crumble"	Best Video	Nominated	
2024	"Cold Treatment"	Best Video	Nominated	
2024	Louis Leimbach for Enough of the Sweet Talk	Best Cover Art	Nominated	

=== Environmental Music Prize ===
The Environmental Music Prize is a quest to find a theme song to inspire action on climate and conservation. It commenced in 2022.

Year	Nominee / work	Award	Result	Ref.
2022	"Addicted to the Sunshine"	Environmental Music Prize	Nominated	

=== J Awards ===
Commencing in 2005, the J Awards are an annual series of Australian music awards that were established by the Australian Broadcasting Corporation's youth-focused radio station Triple J. Lime Cordiale have received one nomination.

Year	Nominee / work	Award	Result
2020	14 Steps to a Better You	Australian Album of the Year	Won

=== National Live Music Awards ===
The National Live Music Awards (NLMAs) are a broad recognition of Australia's diverse live industry, celebrating the success of the Australian live scene. The awards commenced in 2016. Lime Cordiale have been nominated for one award.

Year	Nominee / work	Award	Result
2020	Lime Cordiale	NSW Act Voice of the Year	Nominated

=== Rolling Stone Australia Awards ===
The Rolling Stone Australia Awards are awarded annually in January or February by the Australian edition of Rolling Stone magazine for outstanding contributions to popular culture in the previous year.

Year	Nominee / work	Award	Result	Ref.
2021	14 Steps to a Better You	Best Record	Nominated	
2021	Lime Cordiale	Rolling Stone Reader's Award	Nominated	
2023	Lime Cordiale	Readers’ Choice Award	Won	
2024	"Colin"	Best Single	Nominated	
2025	Enough of the Sweet Talk	Best LP/EP	Shortlisted	
