= Ball Park Music discography =

Band discography

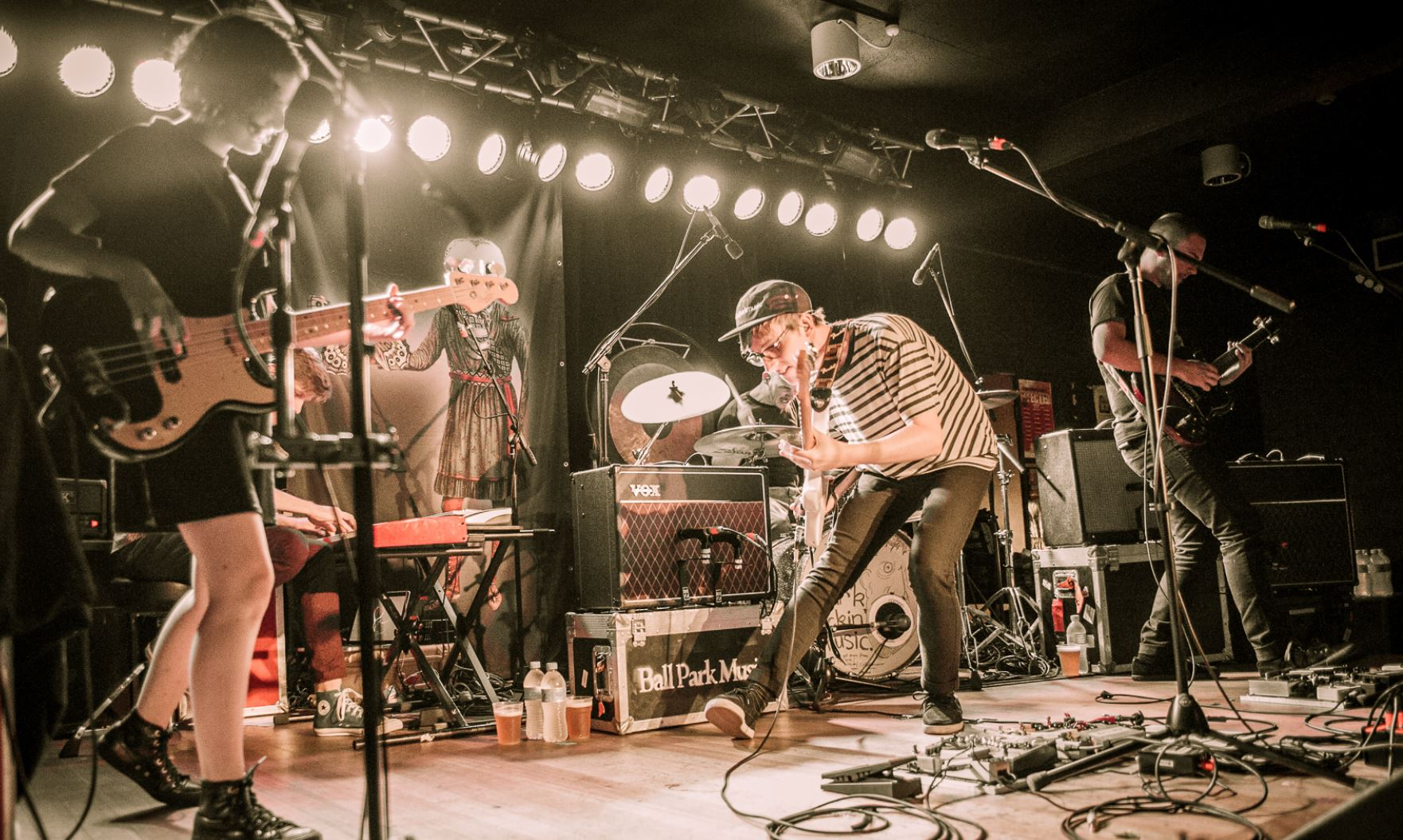
- Ball Park Music performing during the Puddinghead Tour in 2014
- Studio albums: 8
- EPs: 2
- Live albums: 2
- Singles: 28

Since their formation in 2008, Australian indie rock band Ball Park Music have released eight studio albums, two extended plays (EPs), two live albums and 28 singles. Their debut studio album, Happiness and Surrounding Suburbs, was released in 2011 after their first two EPs, and peaked at number 26 on the ARIA Albums Chart. It was followed the next year with Museum, which debuted at number nine. Their succeeding five studio albums have all debuted within the top five on the chart, with Like Love being their most recent release in 2025.

== Albums ==
=== Studio albums ===
List of studio albums, with release date, label, and selected chart positions shown
Title	Album details	Peak chart positions
Title	Album details	AUS
Happiness and Surrounding Suburbs	Released: 9 September 2011; Label: Stop Start (SSM13); Formats: CD, LP, digital download	26
Museum	Released: 5 October 2012; Label: Stop Start (SSM36); Format: CD, LP, digital download	9
Puddinghead	Released: 4 April 2014; Label: Stop Start (SSM77); Format: CD, LP, digital download	2
Every Night the Same Dream	Released: 19 August 2016; Label: Stop Start (SSM121); Format: CD, LP, digital download, streaming	3
Good Mood	Released: 16 February 2018; Label: Stop Start (SSM142); Format: CD, LP, digital download, streaming	5
Ball Park Music	Released: 23 October 2020; Label: Prawn (Prawn001); Formats: CD, LP, digital download, streaming	2
Weirder & Weirder	Released: 27 May 2022; Label: Prawn (Prawn002); Formats: CD, LP, digital download, streaming	2
Like Love	Released: 4 April 2025; Label: Prawn (Prawn004); Formats: CD, LP, digital download, streaming	1

=== Live albums ===
List of live albums, with release date and label shown
Title	Album details
Triple J Live at the Wireless – Enmore Theatre, Sydney 2018	Released: 25 September 2020; Label: ABC Music; Formats: Digital download, streaming
Triple J Live at the Wireless – Horden Pavillion, Sydney 2022	Released: 24 November 2023; Label: ABC Music; Formats: Digital download, streaming

== Extended plays ==
List of EPs, with release date and label shown
Title	Details
Rolling on the Floor, Laughing Ourselves to Sleep	Released: 30 April 2009; Label: Ball Park Music; Format: CD, digital download
Conquer the Town, Easy as Cake	Released: 21 May 2010; Label: Ball Park Music (MBBPM2752); Format: CD, digital download

== Singles ==
List of singles, with year released, selected chart positions and certifications, and album name shown
Title	Year	Peak chart positions	Year-end positions	Certifications	Album
Title	Year	AUS	Triple J Hottest 100	Certifications	Album
"Sea Strangers (I Don't Really Know You)"	2009	—	—		Conquer the Town, Easy as Cake
"iFly"	2010	—	—		Conquer the Town, Easy as Cake
"Sad Rude Future Dude"	2010	—	—		Happiness and Surrounding Suburbs
"Come Together" (with Hungry Kids of Hungary)	2011	—	—		Non-album single
"Rich People Are Stupid"	2011	—	—		Happiness and Surrounding Suburbs
"It's Nice to Be Alive"	2011	—	31	ARIA: Platinum	Happiness and Surrounding Suburbs
"All I Want Is You"	2011	—	38		Happiness and Surrounding Suburbs
"Literally Baby"	2011	—	—		Happiness and Surrounding Suburbs
"Surrender"	2012	—	27		Museum
"Coming Down"	2012	—	23		Museum
"She Only Loves Me When I'm There"	2014	70	19	ARIA: Platinum	Puddinghead
"Trippin' the Light Fantastic"	2014	—	99		Puddinghead
"Pariah"	2016	—	—		Every Night the Same Dream
"Nihilist Party Anthem"	2016	—	—		Every Night the Same Dream
"Whipping Boy"	2016	—	—		Every Night the Same Dream
"Exactly How You Are"	2017	—	18	ARIA: Platinum	Good Mood
"The Perfect Life Does Not Exist"	2017	—	39		Good Mood
"Hands Off My Body"	2018	—	—		Good Mood
"Spark Up!"	2020	—	—		Ball Park Music
"Day & Age"	2020	—	63		Ball Park Music
"Cherub"	2020	52	4	ARIA: Platinum	Ball Park Music
"Paranoid Android" (cover of Radiohead)	2020	—	—		Non-album single
"Sunscreen"	2021	—	21		Weirder & Weirder
"Stars in My Eyes"	2022	—	8		Weirder & Weirder
"Manny"	2022	—	—		Weirder & Weirder
"Like Love"	2024	—	43		Like Love
"Please Don't Move to Melbourne"	2025	—	10		Like Love
"Coast Is Clear"	2025	—	—		Like Love
"Hide and Seek" (cover of Imogen Heap)	2025	—	—		Non-album single

=== Other appearances ===
List of appearances on compilation albums
Title	Year	Album
"Do You Realize??" (cover of the Flaming Lips)	2012	Triple J Like a Version 8
"Diane Young" (cover of Vampire Weekend)	2015	Triple J Like a Version 11
"My Happiness" (cover of Powderfinger)	2018	Triple J Like a Version 14
"Oomba Baroomba" (cover of Play School)	2023	Show Time Season 4
