= ARIA Award for Best Rock Album =

Annual Australian music industry award

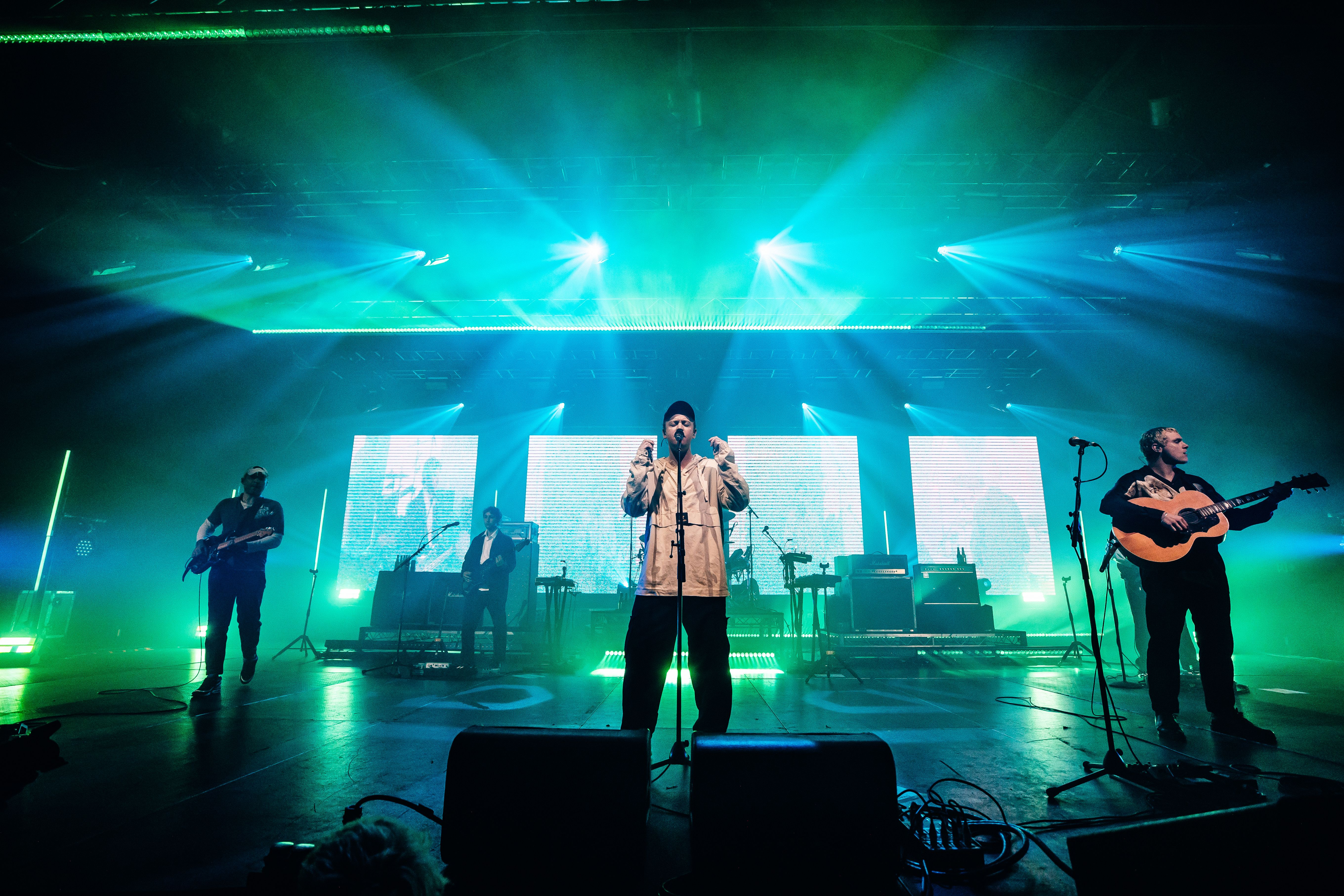
- 2026 winner DMA's
- Country: Australia
- Presented by: Australian Recording Industry Association (ARIA)
- First award: 1998
- Currently held by: DMA's, DMA's (2026)

Highlights
- Most wins: Amyl and the Sniffers, Powderfinger and Tame Impala (3 each)
- Most nominations: The Living End (6)
- Website: ariaawards.com.au

The ARIA Music Award for Best Rock Album, is an award presented at the annual ARIA Music Awards, which recognises "the many achievements of Aussie artists across all music genres", since 1987. It is handed out by the Australian Recording Industry Association (ARIA), an organisation whose aim is "to advance the interests of the Australian record industry." To be eligible, the recording must be an album in the contemporary rock, modern rock and active rock formats, and cannot be entered in other genre categories. The accolade is voted for by the ARIA Judging Academy, which consists of 1000 members from different areas of the music industry, and is given to a solo artist or group who is either from Australia or an Australian resident.

Amyl and the Sniffers, Powderfinger and Tame Impala are tied for the most awards for Best Rock Album with three each, with the former being the only artist to win all their nominations. The Living End have the most nominations with six. Ball Park Music have the most nominations without a win with five, though Jimmy Barnes also reaches this total counting both his three nominations as a member of Cold Chisel and two as a solo artist, none of which he won.

== Winners and nominees ==
In the following table, the winner is highlighted in a separate colour, and in boldface; the nominees are those that are not highlighted or in boldface.

Winner marked in a separate colour

| Year | Winner(s) | Album title |
|---|---|---|
**1998** (12th)
| **1998** (12th) | **The Superjesus** | **Sumo** |
| **1998** (12th) | The Angels | Skin & Bone |
| **1998** (12th) | Moler | Golden Duck |
| **1998** (12th) | Ricaine | The Clarity of Distance |
| **1998** (12th) | The Screaming Jets | World Gone Crazy |
**1999** (13th)
| **1999** (13th) | **Powderfinger** | **Internationalist** |
| **1999** (13th) | Cold Chisel | The Last Wave of Summer |
| **1999** (13th) | Frenzal Rhomb | A Man's Not a Camel |
| **1999** (13th) | Henry's Anger | Personality Test |
| **1999** (13th) | Silverchair | Neon Ballroom |
**2000** (14th)
| **2000** (14th) | **Killing Heidi** | **Reflector** |
| **2000** (14th) | Area-7 | Bitter & Twisted |
| **2000** (14th) | Deadstar | Somewhere Over the Radio |
| **2000** (14th) | Grinspoon | Grinspoon |
| **2000** (14th) | Shihad | The General Electric |
**2001** (15th)
| **2001** (15th) | **Powderfinger** | **Odyssey Number Five** |
| **2001** (15th) | The Living End | Roll On |
| **2001** (15th) | The Mark of Cain | This is This |
| **2001** (15th) | Motor Ace | Five Star Laundry |
| **2001** (15th) | The Superjesus | Jet Age |
**2002** (16th)
| **2002** (16th) | **Silverchair** | **Diorama** |
| **2002** (16th) | Alex Lloyd | Watching Angels Mend |
| **2002** (16th) | Grinspoon | New Detention |
| **2002** (16th) | Motor Ace | Shoot This |
| **2002** (16th) | The Vines | Highly Evolved |
**2003** (17th)
| **2003** (17th) | **Powderfinger** | **Vulture Street** |
| **2003** (17th) | Magic Dirt | Tough Love |
| **2003** (17th) | Nick Cave and the Bad Seeds | Nocturama |
| **2003** (17th) | The Sleepy Jackson | Lovers |
| **2003** (17th) | Something for Kate | The Official Fiction |
**2004** (18th)
| **2004** (18th) | **Jet** | **Get Born** |
| **2004** (18th) | Dallas Crane | Dallas Crane |
| **2004** (18th) | Eskimo Joe | A Song Is a City |
| **2004** (18th) | The Living End | Modern Artillery |
| **2004** (18th) | Spiderbait | Tonight Alright |
**2005** (19th)
| **2005** (19th) | **Grinspoon** | **Thrills, Kills & Sunday Pills** |
| **2005** (19th) | Evermore | Dreams |
| **2005** (19th) | Little Birdy | BigBigLove |
| **2005** (19th) | Shihad | Love Is the New Hate |
| **2005** (19th) | The Cat Empire | Two Shoes |
**2006** (20th)
| **2006** (20th) | **Wolfmother** | **Wolfmother** |
| **2006** (20th) | Augie March | Moo, You Bloody Choir |
| **2006** (20th) | Eskimo Joe | Black Fingernails, Red Wine |
| **2006** (20th) | The Living End | State of Emergency |
| **2006** (20th) | You Am I | Convicts |
**2007** (21st)
| **2007** (21st) | **Silverchair** | **Young Modern** |
| **2007** (21st) | Airbourne | Runnin' Wild |
| **2007** (21st) | Grinspoon | Alibis & Other Lies |
| **2007** (21st) | Jet | Shine On |
| **2007** (21st) | Powderfinger | Dream Days at the Hotel Existence |
**2008** (22nd)
| **2008** (22nd) | **The Living End** | **White Noise** |
| **2008** (22nd) | Eddy Current Suppression Ring | Primary Colours |
| **2008** (22nd) | Faker | Be the Twilight |
| **2008** (22nd) | Gyroscope | Breed Obsession |
| **2008** (22nd) | Nick Cave and the Bad Seeds | Dig, Lazarus, Dig!!! |
**2009** (23rd)
| **2009** (23rd) | **AC/DC** | **Black Ice** |
| **2009** (23rd) | The Drones | Havilah |
| **2009** (23rd) | Eskimo Joe | Inshalla |
| **2009** (23rd) | Jet | Shaka Rock |
| **2009** (23rd) | The Temper Trap | Conditions |
**2010** (24th)
| **2010** (24th) | **Birds of Tokyo** | **Birds of Tokyo** |
| **2010** (24th) | Cloud Control | Bliss Release |
| **2010** (24th) | Eddy Current Suppression Ring | Rush to Relax |
| **2010** (24th) | Powderfinger | Golden Rule |
| **2010** (24th) | Tame Impala | Innerspeaker |
**2011** (25th)
| **2011** (25th) | **The Living End** | **The Ending Is Just the Beginning Repeating** |
| **2011** (25th) | Children Collide | Theory of Everything |
| **2011** (25th) | Eskimo Joe | Ghosts of the Past |
| **2011** (25th) | Jebediah | Kosciuszko |
| **2011** (25th) | Papa Vs Pretty | United in Isolation |
**2012** (26th)
| **2012** (26th) | **The Temper Trap** | **The Temper Trap** |
| **2012** (26th) | Children Collide | Monument |
| **2012** (26th) | Cold Chisel | No Plans |
| **2012** (26th) | Oh Mercy | Deep Heat |
| **2012** (26th) | The Jezabels | Prisoner |
**2013** (27th)
| **2013** (27th) | **Tame Impala** | **Lonerism** |
| **2013** (27th) | Birds of Tokyo | March Fires |
| **2013** (27th) | Boy & Bear | Harlequin Dream |
| **2013** (27th) | The Drones | I See Seaweed |
| **2013** (27th) | The Rubens | The Rubens |
**2014** (28th)
| **2014** (28th) | **Dan Sultan** | **Blackbird** |
| **2014** (28th) | Angus & Julia Stone | Angus & Julia Stone |
| **2014** (28th) | Ball Park Music | Puddinghead |
| **2014** (28th) | Jimmy Barnes | 30:30 Hindsight |
| **2014** (28th) | Kingswood | Microscopic Wars |
**2015** (29th)
| **2015** (29th) | **Tame Impala** | **Currents** |
| **2015** (29th) | Courtney Barnett | Sometimes I Sit and Think, and Sometimes I Just Sit |
| **2015** (29th) | Dead Letter Circus | Aesthesis |
| **2015** (29th) | Gang of Youths | The Positions |
| **2015** (29th) | The Preatures | Blue Planet Eyes |
**2016** (30th)
| **2016** (30th) | **Violent Soho** | **Waco** |
| **2016** (30th) | Ball Park Music | Every Night the Same Dream |
| **2016** (30th) | Boy & Bear | Limit of Love |
| **2016** (30th) | Gang of Youths | Let Me Be Clear |
| **2016** (30th) | The Living End | Shift |
**2017** (31st)
| **2017** (31st) | **Gang of Youths** | **Go Farther in Lightness** |
| **2017** (31st) | Dan Sultan | Killer |
| **2017** (31st) | Dune Rats | The Kids Will Know It's Bullshit |
| **2017** (31st) | Polish Club | Alright Already |
| **2017** (31st) | The Preatures | Girlhood |
**2018** (32nd)
| **2018** (32nd) | **Courtney Barnett** | **Tell Me How You Really Feel** |
| **2018** (32nd) | Camp Cope | How to Socialise & Make Friends |
| **2018** (32nd) | DMA's | For Now |
| **2018** (32nd) | Luca Brasi | Stay |
| **2018** (32nd) | Middle Kids | Lost Friends |
**2019** (33rd)
| **2019** (33rd) | **Amyl and the Sniffers** | **Amyl and the Sniffers** |
| **2019** (33rd) | Holy Holy | My Own Pool of Light |
| **2019** (33rd) | Jimmy Barnes | My Criminal Record |
| **2019** (33rd) | Midnight Oil | Armistice Day: Live at the Domain, Sydney |
| **2019** (33rd) | Skegss | My Own Mess |
**2020** (34th)
| **2020** (34th) | **Tame Impala** | **The Slow Rush** |
| **2020** (34th) | Cold Chisel | Blood Moon |
| **2020** (34th) | DMA's | The Glow |
| **2020** (34th) | Ocean Alley | Lonely Diamond |
| **2020** (34th) | Violent Soho | Everything Is A-OK |
**2021** (35th)
| **2021** (35th) | **Middle Kids** | **Today We're the Greatest** |
| **2021** (35th) | AC/DC | Power Up |
| **2021** (35th) | Ball Park Music | Ball Park Music |
| **2021** (35th) | Holy Holy | Hello My Beautiful World |
| **2021** (35th) | Midnight Oil | The Makarrata Project |
**2022** (36th)
| **2022** (36th) | **Amyl and the Sniffers** | **Comfort to Me** |
| **2022** (36th) | Ball Park Music | Weirder & Weirder |
| **2022** (36th) | Gang of Youths | Angel in Realtime |
| **2022** (36th) | King Stingray | King Stingray |
| **2022** (36th) | Spacey Jane | Here Comes Everybody |
**2023** (37th)
| **2023** (37th) | **King Gizzard & the Lizard Wizard** | **Ice, Death, Planets, Lungs, Mushrooms and Lava** |
| **2023** (37th) | Bad//Dreems | Hoo Ha! |
| **2023** (37th) | DMA's | How Many Dreams? |
| **2023** (37th) | G Flip | Drummer |
| **2023** (37th) | Pacific Avenue | Flowers |
**2024** (38th)
| **2024** (38th) | **Royel Otis** | **Pratts & Pain** |
| **2024** (38th) | Angie McMahon | Light, Dark, Light Again |
| **2024** (38th) | Grinspoon | Whatever, Whatever |
| **2024** (38th) | King Gizzard & the Lizard Wizard | Flight b741 |
| **2024** (38th) | Middle Kids | Faith Crisis Pt 1 |
**2025** (39th)
| **2025** (39th) | **Amyl and the Sniffers** | **Cartoon Darkness** |
| **2025** (39th) | Ball Park Music | Like Love |
| **2025** (39th) | King Stingray | For the Dreams |
| **2025** (39th) | Royel Otis | Hickey |
| **2025** (39th) | Spacey Jane | If That Makes Sense |
**2026** (40th)
| **2026** (40th) | **DMA's** | **DMA's** |
| **2026** (40th) | Courtney Barnett | Creature of Habit |
| **2026** (40th) | Teen Jesus and the Jean Teasers | Glory |
| **2026** (40th) | The Belair Lip Bombs | Again |
| **2026** (40th) | The Temper Trap | Sungazer |

== Artists with multiple wins ==
3 wins

- Amyl and the Sniffers
- Powderfinger
- Tame Impala

2 wins

- The Living End
- Silverchair

== Artists with multiple nominations ==
6 nominations

- The Living End

5 nominations

- Ball Park Music
- Jimmy Barnes (Note: Including three as a member of Cold Chisel.)
- Grinspoon
- Powderfinger

4 nominations

- DMA's
- Eskimo Joe
- Gang of Youths
- Tame Impala

3 nominations

- Amyl and the Sniffers
- Courtney Barnett
- Cold Chisel
- Jet
- Middle Kids
- Silverchair
- The Temper Trap

2 nominations

- AC/DC
- Birds of Tokyo
- Boy & Bear
- Children Collide
- The Drones
- Eddy Current Suppression Ring
- Holy Holy
- King Gizzard & the Lizard Wizard
- King Stingray
- Midnight Oil
- Motor Ace
- Nick Cave and the Bad Seeds
- The Preatures
- Royel Otis
- Shihad
- Dan Sultan
- Spacey Jane
- The Superjesus
- Violent Soho
