= Animal (Motor Ace album) =

Studio album by Motor Ace
- Released: August 2005
- Genre: Post-grunge
- Length: 46:57
- Label: Mushroom
- Producer: Patrick Robertson

Motor Ace chronology
| Shoot This (2002) | Animal (2005) | Demo's and B-Sides (2019) |

Animal is the third studio album by Australian post-grunge band Motor Ace, released in August 2005. The album peaked at number 21 on the ARIA Charts. The commercial failure of the album prompted Motor Ace to officially disband by the end of 2005.

== Singles ==
The album spawned two singles, "Tomorrow's Gone" was released in June 2005 and peaked at number 41 on the ARIA singles chart. "A little Closer" was released in September 2005 and peaked at number 99 on the ARIA chart.

== Track listing ==
1. "Want You" – 3:59
2. "The Time, the Place" – 4:24
3. "A Little Closer" – 5:24
4. "Not So Blue" – 3:31
5. "Ordinary Day" – 4:49
6. "Tomorrow's Gone" – 4:07
7. "The Winning Streak" – 5:02
8. "You'll Fall" – 5:07
9. "In Space" – 4:36
10. "No Place to Go" – 5:58

== Charts ==
| Chart (2005) | Peak position |
|---|---|
| Australian Albums (ARIA) | 21 |

== Personnel ==
- Patrick Robertson - guitar, piano, lead vocal, programming
- Damian Costin - drums, percussion
- Matt Balfe - bass, guitar, background vocals
- Dave Ong - guitar, background vocals
