= Bitter & Twisted =

Bitter & Twisted may refer to:

- Bitter & Twisted (album), a 2000 album by Area-7
- Bitter & Twisted (film), a 2007 Australian film
- "Bitter and Twisted", a song by Jimmy Nail from the 1994 album Crocodile Shoes
- Bitter and Twisted, a prize-winning beer from Harviestoun Brewery

== See also ==
- Bitter Sweet & Twisted
