= Cherub (song) =

2020 song by Ball Park Music

Single by Ball Park Music

from the album Ball Park Music
- Released: 27 August 2020
- Recorded: 2019–2020
- Studio: Prawn HQ (Brisbane, QLD); Free Energy Device (Sydney, NSW); King Willy Sound (Launceston, TAS)
- Genre: Indie folk; indie rock
- Length: 5:28
- Label: Prawn Records
- Songwriter: Sam Cromack
- Producers: Paul McKercher; William Bowden

Ball Park Music singles chronology
"Day & Age" (2020)	"Cherub" (2020)	"Sunscreen" (2021)

Music video
- "Cherub" on YouTube

"Cherub" is a song by Australian indie rock band Ball Park Music, released on 27 August 2020 as the third and final single from their eponymous sixth studio album Ball Park Music (2020).

"Cherub" peaked at number 52 on the ARIA Singles Chart and was certified platinum in Australia in 2023 for selling 70,000 units. "Cherub" was considered a favourite to top Triple J's Hottest 100 of 2020, ultimately polling at number four.

== Background ==
In a press release, frontman Sam Cromack discussed how the song came to exist, stating:

"The main tune had been kicking around for years and it was Dean who implored me to develop it into a song. A chorus came together pretty quickly. It was pure escapism; it felt easy to imagine a character who runs away and rips a phone number from a flyer to start a new life. The song was building with a very optimistic tone, but it didn’t feel quite right. It felt off-balance, too starry-eyed. The platypus was waiting for the Queen. I sat by the water for a long time with no verses."

"Cherub" is one of the longest songs the band have ever written, which caused the band to consider never releasing it.

== Recording ==
"Cherub" existed as a demo prior to the song's creation, which Sam Cromack discussed in an interview with Jaxsta's Rod Yates, stating:

"Like a lot of songwriters, my voice memo app is full of ideas. This was one I kept coming back to. I had the verse melody and the little ditty on guitar that matches it, and I also had that chorus lyric. It was Dean [Hanson, guitar] who was like, 'There’s something special about that, you’ve got to finish that song.'".

The song was recorded alongside the rest of the album from late 2019 to early 2020.

== Composition ==
An indie folk and indie rock "slow burner", "Cherub" begins with "acoustic guitars and layered vocals" before "gradually build[ing] to a glorious peak".

The song discusses "personal growth" and "when you're feeling like you're not your best self and not wanting to be a burden on the people around you." The song's build was partially inspired by the Middle East's song "Blood".

== Critical reception ==
Music Feeds called the song a "slow-burner that’s deceptively sunny" and praised "its delicate guitars and understated keyboards".

The Newcastle Herald described the song as "the album's torch-waving moment" and labelled it as the album's answer to "Exactly How You Are".

Beat Magazine labelled the song "Beatles-esque.

== Music video ==
An accompanying music video was released on 27 August 2020, directed by the band's guitarist Dean Hanson.

=== Synopsis ===
Rolling Stone Australia stated the music video shows "uplifting footage of butterflies in their natural habitat, reflecting the sunny disposition and feeling of freedom that the track seems to evoke within its listeners."

=== Reception ===
Triple J's Al Newstead felt the music video to be "suitably idyllic".

== Live performances ==
On 11 September 2020, Ball Park Music performed "Cherub" live from their studio "Prawn Records HQ", which NME Australia premiered exclusively.

On 23 October 2020, the band performed the song live for Triple J's Like a Version segment, additionally performing a cover of Radiohead's "Paranoid Android".

On 21 December 2020, the band performed the song live for Australian live music program The Sound.

== Credits and personnel ==
Adapted from the parent album's liner notes.

Ball Park Music – writing, production, recording

- Sam Cromack – vocals, guitars
- Jennifer Boyce – vocals, bass
- Daniel Hanson – drums, tambourine, vocals
- Dean Hanson – guitar, vocals
- Paul Furness – piano, synthesisers, trombone, vocals

Other musicians

- Paul McKercher – mixing
- William Bowden – mastering

== Charts ==
Chart performance for "Cherub"
Chart (2021)	Peak position
Australia (ARIA)	52

== Certifications ==
Certifications for "Cherub"
Region	Certification	Certified units/sales
Australia (ARIA)	Platinum	70,000^{‡}
^{‡} Sales+streaming figures based on certification alone.
