= Say It to My Face =

Say It to My Face may refer to:

- Say It to My Face (album), a 2001 album by Area-7
- "Say It to My Face", a 2017 song by Maty Noyes
- "Say It to My Face", a 2017 song by Madison Beer
- "Say It (To My Face)", a 2022 song by Meet Me at the Altar from Past // Present // Future
