= Keeping Secrets =

Single by Motor Ace

from the album Shoot This
- Released: May 2002
- Genre: Post-grunge
- Length: 4:26
- Label: Sputnik Records
- Songwriter(s): Patrick Robertson
- Producer(s): Chris Sheldon

Motor Ace singles chronology
"Carry On" (2002)	"Keeping Secrets" (2002)	"Tomorrow's Gone" (2005)

"Keeping Secrets" is a song by Australian band Motor Ace. The song was released in May 2002 as the second and final single from the band's second studio album Shoot This. The song peaked at number 30 on the ARIA Charts.

== Interpretation ==
A hooky, guitar driven introduction blends into an impassioned narrative that explodes into one of the most melodic choruses heard this year. Vocalist Patrick Robertson said that the song is "…about having the best night of your life…feeling the anticipation of the night ahead – the night you’ve been waiting for all week long. ‘Keeping Secrets’ refers to the idea that the ‘city lights’ hold the secret to the nights pleasures and dramas, to the unpredictability that makes life exciting."

== Track listing ==
1. "Keeping Secrets"
2. "Can't Ask You Twice"
3. "Not Stalking You"
4. "Death Defy" (Live)
5. "Carry On"

== Charts ==
Chart (2002)	Peak position
Australia (ARIA)	30
