= I Want That =

I Want That may refer to:

- I Want That!, a TV series on the Fine Living network
- "I Want That", a 1959 song written by E. Lewis and Weisman, performed by Billy "Crash" Caddock in 1962
- "I Want That", a 2008 song by Psapp from The Camel's Back
- "I Want That", a 2023 song by South Korean girl group (G)I-dle from Heat

== See also ==
- I Want That You Are Always Happy, a 2011 album by the Middle East
