= Carry On (Motor Ace song) =

Single by Motor Ace

from the album Shoot This
- Released: April 2002
- Genre: Post-grunge
- Length: 4:14
- Label: Sputnik
- Songwriter(s): Patrick Robertson
- Producer(s): Chris Sheldon

Motor Ace singles chronology
"Hey Driver" (2001)	"Carry On" (2002)	"Keeping Secrets" (2002)

"Carry On" is a song by Australian band Motor Ace and is the first single from the band's second studio album Shoot This (2002). "Carry On" peaked at number 13 on the ARIA Charts. The song was used as the theme song for The Australian newspaper on television. "Carry On" placed 29th on the Triple J Hottest 100, 2002 and was featured on Volume 10 of Hottest 100 CD and DVD released in 2003.

== Track listing ==
1. "Carry On" – 4:14
2. "Opportunity" – 4:06
3. "Pieces" – 4:07

== Charts ==
Chart performance for "Carry On"
Chart (2002)	Peak position
Australia (ARIA)	13
