= The Recordings of the Middle East =

EP by The Middle East
- Released: 2008
- Genre: Folk, post-rock
- Length: 26:15
- Label: The Middle East, Spunk Records (2009)
- Producer: L’Orfèvre, The Middle East

The Middle East chronology
The Recordings of the Middle East (2008)	I Want That You Are Always Happy (2011)

The Recordings of the Middle East is the first extended play released by Australian folk band The Middle East. The EP was self-release in 2008 and re-released on Spunk Records in 2009.

== Track listing ==
2008 release
No.	Title	Length
1.	"The Darkest Side"	5:07
2.	"Beleriand"	5:01
3.	"Lonely"	7:27
4.	"Blood"	5:27
5.	"Fool's Gold"	3:14
6.	"Pig Food"	7:10
7.	"The Fall of Man" (featuring Mark Myers)	5:39
8.	"Tsietsi"	13:06

2009 release
No.	Title	Length
1.	"The Darkest Side"	5:07
2.	"Lonely"	7:27
3.	"Blood"	5:27
4.	"Fool's Gold"	3:14
5.	"Beleriand"	5:01

== Personnel ==
The Middle East:

- Joseph Ireland - Banjo, Glockenspiel, Mandolin, Vocals
- Timothy Barwise - Bass guitar, Vocals
- Melinda Frewen-Lord - Cello
- Javed Sterritt - Drums, Accordion, Vocals
- Jordan Ireland - Guitar, Vocals
- Rohin Jones - Guitar, Vocals
- Bree Tranter - Piano, Keyboards, Flute, Vocals
- Mitch Knox - Trumpet, Guitar, Vocals
- Katrina Frewen-Lord - Viola
- Steve Frewen-Lord - Violin

Additional personnel:

- Choir – Belinda Sherriff, Gabrielle Craine, Hannah Redshaw, Imogen Guest, Kate McHugh, Katherine D, Rachel Ireland, Sam Rowe, Tiffany Holmes
- L’Orfèvre - Producer

== Charts ==
Chart performance for The Recordings of the Middle East
Chart (2009)	Peak position
Australia Physical Singles (ARIA)	4
