= Ball Park Music =

Australian indie rock band

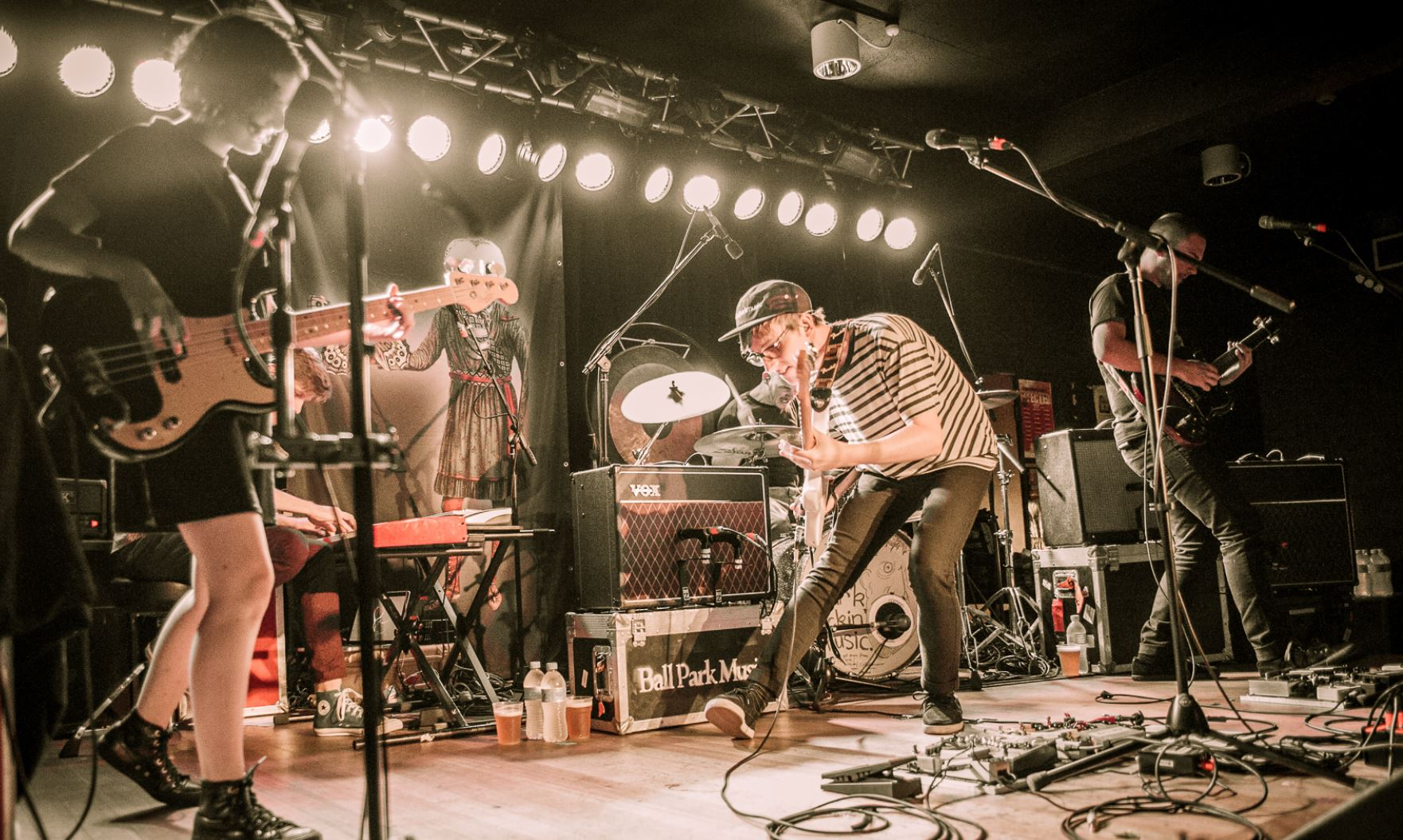
- Ball Park Music performing in 2014

Background information
- Origin: Brisbane, Queensland, Australia
- Genres: Indie rock; indie pop
- Works: Ball Park Music discography
- Years active: 2008–present
- Labels: Stop Start; Inertia; Prawn
- Spinoffs: The Pizzas
- Members: Sam Cromack; Jennifer Boyce; Paul Furness; Dean Hanson; Daniel Hanson
- Past members: Brock Smith
- Website: www.ballparkmusic.com

Ball Park Music is an Australian five-piece indie rock band from Brisbane consisting of Sam Cromack, Jennifer Boyce, Paul Furness, Dean Hanson and Daniel Hanson. Since forming in 2008, the band has released eight studio albums. Their debut, Happiness and Surrounding Suburbs (2011), was nominated for Australian Album of the Year at the J Awards, and its 2012 follow-up, Museum, debuted at number nine on the ARIA charts. Their third album, Puddinghead (2014), was supported by the certified-platinum lead single "She Only Loves Me When I'm There".

Their experimental fourth album Every Night the Same Dream (2016) was praised for its psychedelic rock influence. In 2018, the band released Good Mood, a return to their familiar indie pop sound. Its lead single "Exactly How You Are" polled at number 18 in the Triple J Hottest 100 of 2017, and led the record to critical acclaim with three ARIA Award nominations. In 2020, they released their sixth studio album, Ball Park Music, supported by "Cherub" which polled at number four in the Hottest 100 of 2020. It won Album of the Year at the Queensland Music Awards and peaked at number two on the ARIA charts. The band's seventh album, Weirder & Weirder (2022), was nominated for Best Independent Album and Best Rock Album at the 2022 ARIA Awards.

== Career ==
=== Formation and early releases ===
Ball Park Music was formed in 2008 when all five members were chosen to form a band for an assignment at the Queensland University of Technology. Frontman Sam Cromack came up with the band name years prior as a teenager.

In April 2009, the band independently released their first extended play (EP), Rolling on the Floor, Laughing Ourselves to Sleep. It was quickly championed by Triple J presenter Steph Hughes, who gave an early version of "All I Want Is You" and "Black Skies" their first national airplay.

In 2010, the band released their second EP, Conquer the Town, Easy as Cake. It included the band's first Triple J hit, "iFly", which was added to high rotation and received a five-star rating from Richard Kingsmill. Another song, "Western Whirl", was nominated for both Best Alternative and The Courier-Mail People's Choice Awards at the 2010 Q Song Awards.

In October 2010, the band embarked on their first Australian tour in October with Hungry Kids of Hungary and Big Scary and released the single "Sad Rude Future Dude", which was placed on rotation by Triple J.

Ball Park Music was named as a Triple J New Crop artist ("one of the 20 best new bands in Australia") in November 2010. Further, they were the Queensland winner of a Triple J Unearthed competition and won the chance to play at Big Day Out 2011.

=== 2011: Happiness and Surrounding Suburbs ===
In June 2011, Ball Park Music released "Rich People Are Stupid" which was put on high rotation on Triple J. On 24 June 2011, Ball Park Music signed to Sydney label Stop Start Music to release their debut album. "It's Nice to Be Alive" was released in July 2011, and its music video won the Channel [V] Ripe Clip of the Week. "It's Nice to Be Alive" was featured in the film Blended (2014) and the fifth season of Gossip Girl. The track reached certified platinum status in Australia in 2021.

The band's debut studio album Happiness and Surrounding Suburbs was released in Australia and New Zealand on 9 September and debuted on the Australian ARIA Album Chart the following week at number 36. Ball Park Music embarked on a four-date headline tour with Adelaide rock outfit City Riots on the How I Met Ball Park Music Tour, which was followed by another headline tour to launch their debut album in October with Northeast Party House and The Jungle Giants. Immediately following that, they embarked as main support for Boy & Bear on their "Moonfire Tour".

In November, Ball Park Music were named the Unearthed Artist of the Year at the J Awards, and nominated for the 2011 J Award.

In December it was announced that Happiness and Surrounding Suburbs was voted number 10 in Triple J's Top 10 Albums of 2014 and number two in The AU Review's album poll. To finish off 2011, the band played Peats Ridge Festival and Pyramid Rock in Brisbane.

=== 2012: Museum ===
Ball Park Music began 2012 by announcing The 180° Tour, described as "their most ambitious tour yet", with 14 dates supported by Nantes and Cub Scouts. The band was also added to the 2012 Groovin' the Moo line-up as well as Splendour in the Grass.

On 23 March 2012, Ball Park Music performed on Triple J's live music segment Like a Version, where they performed their single "All I Want Is You" followed by a cover of the Flaming Lips song "Do You Realize??".

On 20 July 2012, it was announced that the band would release new music and released the single "Surrender" leading into their set at Splendour in the Grass. It was followed by the announcement of a second album. Museum was released in Australia on 5 October 2012 and it was named Triple J's Feature Album the following week. The album peaked at number nine on the ARIA charts.

On 21 September 2012, it was announced that the band would be supporting Weezer on their 2013 Australian tour, alongside Cloud Control.

=== 2013–2014: Puddinghead ===
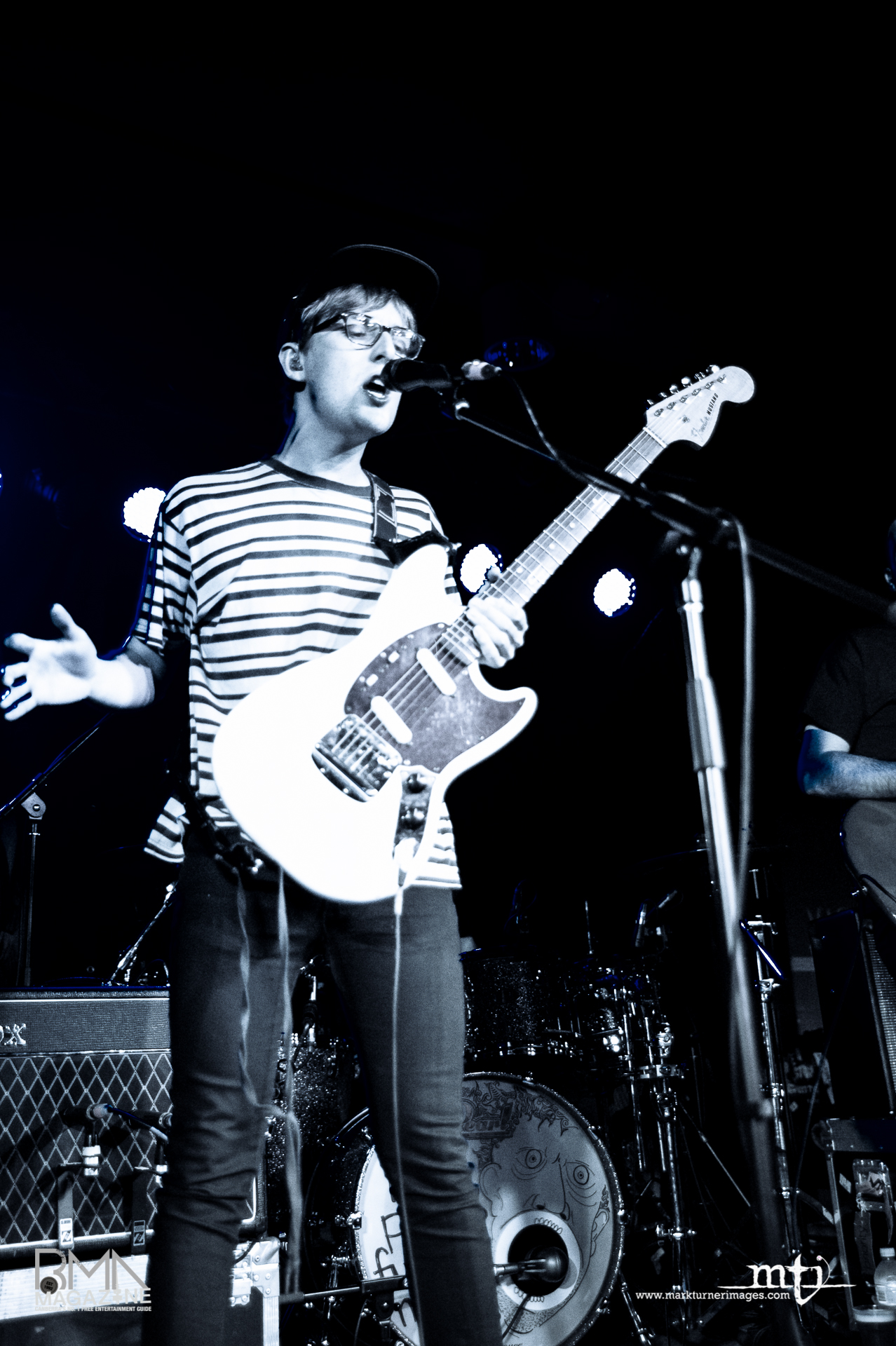
Frontman Sam Cromack performing in 2014

On 14 February 2014, the band issued the lead single to their third studio album. "She Only Loves Me When I'm There" debuted at number 70 on the ARIA Singles Chart and reached certified platinum status in 2021. Second single "Trippin' the Light Fantastic" was released in May 2014. Ball Park Music's first self-produced album, Puddinghead was released on 4 April 2014. It peaked at number 2 on the ARIA Albums Chart, and was nominated for Best Rock Album at the 2014 ARIA Awards. At the 2014 J Awards, the record was nominated for Australian Album of the Year.

=== 2015–2016: Every Night the Same Dream ===
Following a brief hiatus and "some hurdles writing this record", the band's fourth studio album, Every Night the Same Dream, was released on 19 August 2016. It was preceded by seven-minute single "Pariah" and "Nihilist Party Anthem". The album, which sonically takes on a more psychedelic rock sound, was met with acclaim. It debuted at number 3 on the ARIA Albums Chart.

=== 2017–2018: Good Mood ===
In September 2017, Ball Park Music released "Exactly How You Are", the lead single to their fifth studio album. The song would later poll at number 18 in the Hottest 100 of 2017, and reach certified platinum status in Australia in 2021. "The Perfect Life Does Not Exist" was released in December 2017 as the second single. Good Mood was released on 16 February 2018, supported by a national tour in February and March with Ali Barter and Hatchie. "Hands Off My Body" was added to the official NBA 2K19 soundtrack, curated by Travis Scott. The album was nominated in three categories at the ARIA Music Awards of 2018 – Producer of the Year, Engineer of the Year and Best Cover Art.

=== 2019–2020: Ball Park Music ===
The band's sixth album was announced with the title of Mostly Sunny in March 2020, alongside the release of single "Spark Up!". The following month, the band announced they were changing the title of the upcoming album to Ball Park Music. It was their first album to be released independently under their own label, Prawn Records.

A scheduled tour was cancelled due to the COVID-19 pandemic in Australia, although the release of the self-titled album in October 2020 was followed by a concert residency at a venue in Brisbane. The album included the track "Cherub", which was considered a strong contender to reach #1 in the lead-up to the Triple J Hottest 100, 2020. It placed on the list at #4.

=== 2021–2022: Weirder & Weirder ===
On 26 October 2021, the band released single "Sunscreen". It later polled at number 21 on Triple J's Hottest 100 of 2021. The band's seventh studio album was announced on 14 February 2022 with the title of Weirder & Weirder, originally set for release on 3 June 2022, however, it was pushed forward a week to 27 May 2022. The announcement came with dates for a new Australian tour. The album's second single "Stars In My Eyes" was released on 24 February. The song has been favoured by various publications to win the Hottest 100 of 2022. The third single, "Manny" was released on 6 May.

The band performed live in Sydney for the ABC's New Year's Eve concert on 31 December 2022. They performed originals "Stars In My Eyes", "Trippin' the Light Fantastic" and "It's Nice to Be Alive", as well as "The Real Thing" by Russell Morris and "Even When I'm Sleeping" by Leonardo's Bride.

=== 2023–present: Like Love ===
In February 2025, the group announced the forthcoming release of Like Love, scheduled for release on 4 April 2025. The album is preceded by the title track and "Please Don't Move to Melbourne". The album debuted at number 1 on the ARIA Chart.

The group supported Oasis for the Australian leg of the Oasis Live '25 Tour in November 2025.

In 2026, Ball Park Music are scheduled to headline a new festival in the Adelaide suburb of Modbury, A Day in the Gully.

== Band members ==
- Sam Cromack – lead vocals, lead guitar (2008–present)
- Jennifer Boyce – bass guitar, backing vocals (2008–present)
- Paul Furness – keyboards, trombone (2008–present)
- Dean Hanson – rhythm guitar, bass guitar, backing vocals (2008–present)
- Daniel Hanson – drums, backing vocals (2008–present)

Former members

- Brock Smith – lead and rhythm guitar (2008–2011)

== Side projects ==
=== The Pizzas ===
The Pizzas are the secret side project of Ball Park Music. Formed as a way to practice their live shows before Splendour in the Grass, the Pizzas play one show annually, with all five members performing under alter egos. As a cover band, their set lists consist almost entirely of Ball Park Music songs.

A running joke is the Pizzas despise both the audience and their label mates. Ball Park Music dismiss the Pizzas as frauds, and encourage fans to verbally abuse their cover band on stage. One post by the former urged, “If you must attend this show (please don’t) can you make every effort to boo the Pizzas, but also can you defend Ball Park in the instance that they try to verbally attack our integrity.” Cromack has vowed the Pizzas will never play “It’s Nice to Be Alive,” nor play a show in Sydney.

=== Other music ===
Cromack records his solo work under the moniker My Own Pet Radio and has released three solo albums, Suburban Lemon Shops and the Bruxer in My Bed (2009), Unidentified Flying Collection of Songs (2010) and Goodlum (2015).

Dean Hanson also record solo work as Zeano, and released his debut album, Window Seat, Always, in 2026.

Jennifer Boyce records solo work under the moniker Little Planes Land.

== Discography ==
- Happiness and Surrounding Suburbs (2011)
- Museum (2012)
- Puddinghead (2014)
- Every Night the Same Dream (2016)
- Good Mood (2018)
- Ball Park Music (2020)
- Weirder & Weirder (2022)
- Like Love (2025)

== Tours ==
=== Headlining ===
- How I Met Ball Park Music Tour (2011)
- Happiness and Surrounding Suburbs Tour (2011)
- 180° Tour (2012)
- Museum Tour (2012)
- Thank Ewes Tour (2013)
- All I Want Is USA • UK • Europe Tour (2013)
- Puddinghead Tour (2014)
- Trippin' the Light Fantastic Tour (2014)
- Every Night The Same Dream Tour (2016)
- Exactly How You Are Tour (2018)
- The Good Good Mood Tour (2019)
- The Residency (2020)
- Weirder & Weirder Australian Tour (2022)
- Get the F**king Nerds Back On! (2023)
- Like Love Tour (2025)
- The Rock and Roll Adventure Continues (2026)

==== Joint tours ====
- The Triple Rainbow Tour (2011) (with Eagle and the Worm & We Say Bamboulee)
- Super Commuter Tour (2011) (with Guineafowl)
- Australian Tour (2018) (with San Cisco)

=== Opening act ===
- Hungry Kids of Hungary – Escapades Tour (2010)
- Boy & Bear – Moonfire Tour (2011)
- Weezer – Australian Tour (2013)
- Lime Cordiale – Enough of the Sweet Talk Tour (2024)
- Oasis – Oasis Live '25 Tour (2025)

== Awards and nominations ==
=== AIR Awards ===
The Australian Independent Record Awards (known colloquially as the AIR Awards) is an annual awards night to recognise, promote and celebrate the success of Australia's independent music sector.

Year	Nominee / work	Award	Result	Ref.
2012	Themselves	Best Independent Artist	Nominated	
2021	Ball Park Music	Independent Album of the Year	Nominated	
2023	Weirder & Weirder	Best Independent Rock Album or EP	Nominated	

=== APRA Awards ===
The APRA Awards are presented annually from 1982 by the Australasian Performing Right Association (APRA), "honouring composers and songwriters".

Year	Nominee / work	Award	Result	Ref.
2019	"Exactly How You Are" (Sam Cromack)	Song of the Year	Shortlisted	
2026	"Like Love" (Sam Cromack)	Song of the Year	Shortlisted	
2026	"Please Don't Move to Melbourne" (Sam Cromack)	Most Performed Australian Work	Nominated	
2026	"Please Don't Move to Melbourne" (Sam Cromack)	Most Performed Alternative Work	Won	

=== ARIA Music Awards ===
The ARIA Music Awards is an annual ceremony presented by Australian Recording Industry Association (ARIA), which recognise excellence, innovation, and achievement across all genres of the music of Australia. They commenced in 1987.

Year	Nominee / work	Award	Result	Ref.
2014	Puddinghead	Best Rock Album	Nominated	
2016	Every Night the Same Dream	Best Rock Album	Nominated	
2021	Ball Park Music	Best Independent Release	Nominated	
2021	Ball Park Music	Best Rock Album	Nominated	
2021	Ball Park Music - The Residency	Best Australian Live Act	Nominated	
2022	Weirder & Weirder	Best Independent Release	Nominated	
2022	Weirder & Weirder	Best Rock Album	Nominated	
2022	Paul McKercher for Ball Park Music – Weirder & Weirder	Mix Engineer – Best Mixed Album	Nominated	
2025	Like Love	Best Independent Release	Nominated	
2025	Like Love	Best Rock Album	Nominated	
2025	Like Love Tour	Best Australian Live Act	Nominated	

=== J Awards ===
The J Awards are an annual series of Australian music awards that were established by the Australian Broadcasting Corporation's youth-focused radio station Triple J. They commenced in 2005.

Year	Nominee / work	Award	Result	Ref.
2011	Happiness and Surrounding Suburbs	Australian Album of the Year	Nominated	
2011	Themselves	Unearthed Artist of the Year	Won	
2014	Puddinghead	Australian Album of the Year	Nominated	
2020	Ball Park Music	Australian Album of the Year	Nominated	
2025	Ball Park Music	Australian Live Act of the Year	Nominated	

=== National Live Music Awards ===
The National Live Music Awards (NLMAs) commenced in 2016 to recognise contributions to the live music industry in Australia.

Year	Nominee / work	Award	Result	Ref.
2018	Themselves	Best Live Act of the Year – People's Choice	Nominated	
2020	Themselves	Live Act of the Year	Nominated	
2023	Themselves	Best Indie/Rock/Alternative Act	Won	
2023	Themselves	Best Live Act in QLD	Won	

=== Queensland Music Awards ===
The Queensland Music Awards (previously known as the Q Song Awards) are an annual awards ceremony celebrating Queensland's brightest emerging artists and established legends. They commenced in 2006.

Year	Nominee / work	Award	Result	Ref.
2013	"Surrender"	Song of the Year	Won	
2013	"Surrender"	Pop Song of the Year	Won	
2021	Ball Park Music	Album of the Year	Won	
2023	Weirder & Weirder	Album of the Year	Won	
2026	Like Love	Album of the Year	Won	
2026	Like Love	Highest Selling Album of the Year	Won	

=== Rolling Stone Australia Awards ===
The Rolling Stone Australia Awards are awarded annually in January or February by the Australian edition of Rolling Stone magazine for outstanding contributions to popular culture in the previous year.

Year	Nominee / work	Award	Result	Ref.
2021	Ball Park Music	Rolling Stone Reader's Award	Nominated	

=== Vanda & Young Global Songwriting Competition ===
The Vanda & Young Global Songwriting Competition is an annual competition that "acknowledges great songwriting whilst supporting and raising money for Nordoff-Robbins" and is coordinated by Albert Music and APRA AMCOS. It commenced in 2009.

Year	Nominee / work	Award	Result	Ref.
2025	"Like Love" (Samuel Cromack)	Vanda & Young Global Songwriting Competition	Finalist	
