= J Awards of 2011 =

Annual Australian music awards

- Date: 30 November 2011
- Venue: Oxford Art Factory, Sydney, Australia
- Website: abc.net.au/triplej

The J Award of 2011 is the seventh annual J Awards, established by the Australian Broadcasting Corporation's youth-focused radio station Triple J. The announcement comes at the culmination of Ausmusic Month (November). For the fourth year, three awards were presented; Australian Album of the Year, Australian Music Video of the Year and Unearthed Artist of the Year. The winners were announced on Wednesday 30 November 2011.

== Who's eligible? ==
Any Australian album released independently or through a record company, or sent to Triple J in consideration for airplay, is eligible for the J Award. The 2011 nominations for Australian Album of the Year and Australian Music Video of the Year were selected from releases received by Triple J between November 2010 and October 2011. For Unearthed Artist of the Year it was open to any artist from the Unearthed (talent contest), who has had a ground breaking and impactful 12 months from November 2010 and October 2011.

== Awards ==
=== Australian Album of the Year ===
| Artist | Album Title | Result |
|---|---|---|
| Gotye | Making Mirrors | Won |
| Drapht | The Life of Riley | Nominated |
| Architecture in Helsinki | Moment Bends | Nominated |
| Art vs. Science | The Experiment | Nominated |
| Kimbra | Vows | Nominated |
| Papa Vs Pretty | United in Isolation | Nominated |
| The Jezabels | Prisoner | Nominated |
| Big Scary | Vacation | Nominated |
| Ball Park Music | Happiness and Surrounding Suburbs | Nominated |
| The Middle East | I Want That You Are Always Happy | Nominated |

=== Australian Video of the Year ===
| Director | Artist and Song | Result |
|---|---|---|
| Emma Tomelty | Hermitude - "Speak of the Devil" | Won |
| David Michod | Children Collide - "Loveless" | Nominated |
| Natasha Pincus | Gotye featuring Kimbra - "Somebody That I Used to Know" | Nominated |
| Samuel Bennetts | Bluejuice - "Act Yr Age" | Nominated |
| SPOD | Art vs Science - "A.I.M. Fire" | Nominated |

=== Unearthed Artist of the Year ===
| Artist | Result |
|---|---|
| Ball Park Music | Won |
| Emma Louise | Nominated |
| Husky | Nominated |
| Lanie Lane | Nominated |
| San Cisco | Nominated |
