= Motor Ace =

Australian alternative rock band

- Origin: Melbourne, Victoria, Australia
- Genres: Alternative rock, post-grunge
- Years active: 1998–2005, 2018–present
- Label: Sputnik/Festival Mushroom
- Members: Patrick "Patch" Robertson; Dave Ong; Damian Costin; Matt Balfe
- Past members: Alexander Reid

Motor Ace are an Australian alternative rock band. Formed in Melbourne in 1998 out of the remains of another band named Snowblind, their members are Patrick "Patch" Robertson (vocals/guitar), Damian Birchall Costin (drums), Matt Balfe (bass), and Dave Ong (guitar).

== History ==
=== 1998–2000: Early history ===
Motor Ace began recording their debut release, a self-titled EP, during April 1999. They worked with producer Paul McKercher, who had previously worked with bands such as You Am I and The Cruel Sea. Along with 28 Days, Machine Gun Fellatio, and NoKTuRNL, they were part of a collection of young Australian acts signed to Festival Mushroom Records' development label Sputnik, which launched in 1999. The eventual track listing of their self-titled release included "Chairman of the Board", "Chromakey", "Criminal Past", "Lowrider", and "Fluke". Triple J gave the band heavy airplay, assisting the band on their touring schedule. Afterwards, the singles "Death Defy" (which was later used as the title theme for TV show The Secret Life of Us), "American Shoes", and "Hey Driver" were released throughout the course of 2000. Some of them charted in the top 100 of the ARIAnet singles chart, while also gaining popularity on Triple J.

=== 2001–2004: Five Star Laundry and Shoot This ===
Motor Ace's debut album, Five Star Laundry, was released in March 2001. It was produced and engineered by Craig Harnath and Chris Dickie in February 2000 at Melbourne's Sing Sing Studios. Due to a heatwave at the time, the nearby power stations had been shut down, and the band were forced to record across the four-week period without air conditioning. During this time, Robertson also lost his voice. According to the band, vocals for the album were completed at 2am on the day both Robertson and Costin were due to fly to London to mix the album with Chris Sheldon, who had previously worked with the Foo Fighters and Therapy?. The album entered the Australian ARIA Chart at number 4.

Motor Ace's second studio album, Shoot This was released in July 2002. The album debuted at number 1 that year and was certified gold. Two singles, "Carry On" and "Keeping Secrets" reached the top 30 in the ARIA Chart.

Motor Ace were put on hold after their 2003 Japanese shows for Shoot This, after the pressuring touring and work schedule was beginning to take its toll on the band – particularly Robertson, who suffers from Crohn's disease. During this period, Costin started a music management group, Fat Guy Management (FGM), while Robertson retreated to his home in Fitzroy and began to develop his songwriting and production techniques. Ong, meanwhile, put together a country-influenced solo album under the name Joni Lightning. Towards the end of this hiatus, the band's management denied that they had split up.

=== 2005: Animal and break-up ===
Preceded by first single "Tomorrow's Gone" in May 2005, the band's third album Animal was released in August 2005. A second single, "A Little Closer", was released on 12 September 2005. Animal peaked at number 21 on the ARIA Charts.

In September 2005, Motor Ace announced that they would officially disband by the year's end, playing farewell shows in Melbourne and Perth during December.

=== 2006–2017: Post break-up ===
The individual members remained on amicable terms in the following years. Robertson worked professionally scoring for film and television, and also began working with Aesop. Ong still occasionally performed around Melbourne with his Joni Lightning project, before picking up work on an oil rig. Costin continued to work in the music industry, eventually founding the company 123 Agency. Balfe went on to play guitar in Melbourne band Five Mile Sniper, and also works for Yarra Valley Water. Both Robertson and Costin were also a part of the band Nighthawk, which formed in 2016.

=== 2018: Reunion ===
In August 2018, it was announced that Robertson, Ong, Costin and Balfe would reunite as Motor Ace for a headlining tour in March and April 2019. The band also announced the release of both Five Star Laundry and Shoot This on vinyl, as well as releasing a compilation entitled B-Sides & Demos online.

In March 2022, Motor Ace released "Knock Knock", their first single in 17 Years.

== Discography ==
=== Studio albums ===
List of studio albums, with selected chart positions and certifications
Title	Album details	Peak chart positions		Certifications
Title	Album details	AUS	NZ	Certifications
Five Star Laundry	Released: March 2001; Label: Sputnik (333402)	4	—	ARIA: Gold
Shoot This	Released: August 2002; Label: Sputnik (335542)	1	40	ARIA: Gold
Animal	Released: August 2005; Label: Sputnik (339012)	21	—	

=== Compilations ===
List of compilations, with selected details
Title	Album details
Demos and B Sides	Released: 6 March 2019; Label: Motor Ace

=== Video albums ===
List of video albums, with selected details
Title	Details
The Time the Place	Released: March 2010; Label: Liberation (LIBDVD1095_1); Recorded: At the Hi-Fi Bar, 23 December 2005

=== Extended plays ===
List of Extended plays, with selected details
Title	EP details
Motor Ace	Released: 1999; Label: Sputnik (SPUT00002)

=== Singles ===
List of singles, with selected chart positions and certifications
Title	Year	Peak chart positions	Album
Title	Year	AUS	Album
"American Shoes"	2000	66	Five Star Laundry
"Death Defy"	2000	66	Five Star Laundry
"Hey Driver"	2001	53	Five Star Laundry
"Carry On"	2002	13	Shoot This
"Keeping Secrets"	2002	30	Shoot This
"Tomorrow's Gone"	2005	41	Animal
"A Little Closer"	2005	99	Animal
"Knock Knock"	2022	—	TBA

== Awards and nominations ==
=== ARIA Music Awards ===
The ARIA Music Awards are a set of annual ceremonies presented by Australian Recording Industry Association (ARIA), which recognise excellence, innovation, and achievement across all genres of the music of Australia. They commenced in 1987.

Year	Nominee / work	Award	Result	Ref.
2001	Five Star Laundry	Best Rock Album	Nominated	
2002	Shoot This	Best Rock Album	Nominated	
