= Shoot This =

Studio album by Motor Ace
- Released: 12 August 2002
- Studio: Hot House Audio, Melbourne; Sing Sing, Melbourne
- Genre: Post-grunge
- Length: 49:29
- Label: Sputnik
- Producer: Chris Sheldon

Motor Ace chronology
Five Star Laundry (2001)	Shoot This (2002)	Animal (2005)

Shoot This is the second studio album by Australian post-grunge band Motor Ace, released in August 2002. The album gained more commercial success than their first album, debuting at number 1 on the ARIA Albums Chart and reached No. 40 in New Zealand.

== Background ==
Shoot This was recorded by Australian post-grunge and alternative rock band Motor Ace with Chris Sheldon producing for Festival Mushroom Records' imprint Sputnik Records, which was issued in August 2002. The group had formed in Melbourne in 1998 and by early the following year the line-up had stabilised with Matt Balfe on bass guitar, Damian Costin on drums, Dave Ong on lead guitar and "Patch" Robertson on lead vocals and guitar. Shoot This, their second studio album, was preceded by two singles "Carry On" in May and "Keeping Secrets" in early August. Both reached the top 30 on the ARIA singles chart. The album debuted at No. 1 and was accredited a gold record for shipment of 35,000 copies by Australian Recording Industry Association (ARIA). On the Official New Zealand Music Chart it peaked at No. 40.

== Track listing ==
All tracks are written by Damian Birchall Costin, Patrick Thomas Robertson, David Ghim Cheng Ong and Matt Charles Balfe.

1. "Carry On" – 4:55
2. "Opportunity" – 4:06
3. "Pieces" – 4:07
4. "Feathers" – 4:10
5. "Keeping Secrets" – 4:36
6. "Ride the Wave" – 4:03
7. "Shoot This" – 4:44
8. "For Yourself" – 4:16
9. "Where Did You Go?" – 4:17
10. "When the Day Falls" – 3:31
11. "When the Feeling's Gone" – 6:44

== Personnel ==
Motor Ace

- Matt Balfe – bass guitar, Hammond organ, backing vocals
- Damian Costin – drums, percussion
- Dave Ong – guitars, piano, backing vocals
- "Patch" Robertson – guitar, piano, lead vocal

Additional musicians

- John Barrett – horn
- Ian Bell – horn
- Chris Sheldon – backing vocals

Artisans

- Chris Blair – mastering
- David Chapman – string arrangements
- David Coulthard Clark – assistant
- Iva Davies – string arrangements
- David Davis – mixing assistant
- Chris Dickie – engineer
- Chris Sheldon – mixing, producer

== Charts ==
=== Weekly charts ===
Chart (2002)	Peak position
Australian Albums (ARIA)	1
New Zealand Albums (RMNZ)	40

=== Year-end charts ===
Chart (2002)	Position
Australian Albums Chart	82
Australian Artist Albums Chart	17

== Certifications ==
Region	Certification	Certified units/sales
Australia (ARIA)	Gold	35,000^{^}
^{^} Shipments figures based on certification alone.

== See also ==
- List of number-one albums of 2002 (Australia)
