= Social Currency =

Single by Children Collide

from the album The Long Now
- A-side: "Social Currency"
- B-side: "Economy, Hail Good Fellow, Chameleon."
- Released: 19 July 2008
- Recorded: Melbourne, Australia
- Genre: Indie rock
- Length: 3:55
- Songwriter: Children Collide
- Producer: Dave Sardy

Children Collide singles chronology
"We Are Amphibious" (2006)	"Social Currency" (2008)	"Skeleton Dance" (2008)

"Social Currency" is a song recorded by Australian indie rock band Children Collide. It was the lead single from the band's debut album, The Long Now. It placed at No. 104 in the Triple J Hottest 100 of 2008.

== Track listing ==
Single
No.	Title	Length
1.	"Social Currency"	3:55
2.	"Economy"	2:04

iTunes single
No.	Title	Length
1.	"Social Currency"	3:55
2.	"Economy"	2:02
3.	"Hail Good Fellow"	4:05
4.	"Chameleon"	4:00
