= Ball Park Music (album) =

Studio album by Ball Park Music
- Released: 23 October 2020
- Recorded: 2019–2020
- Length: 38:59
- Labels: Prawn; Inertia
- Producers: Paul McKercher (Note: Tracks 1–5, 7–11); Sam Cromack (Note: Track 6); William Bowden (Note: All tracks)

Ball Park Music chronology
Good Mood (2018)	Ball Park Music (2020)	Weirder & Weirder (2022)

Singles from Ball Park Music
- 1. "Spark Up!" Released: 19 March 2020; 2. "Day & Age" Released: 5 June 2020; 3. "Cherub" Released: 27 August 2020

Professional ratings
Review scores
Source	Rating
The Newcastle Herald	3.5/5 stars

Ball Park Music is the sixth studio album by Australian indie rock band Ball Park Music, released on 23 October 2020 by Prawn Records and Inertia. Written and recorded in Brisbane throughout the 2019–20 Australian bushfire season, the album was supported by three singles—"Spark Up!", "Day & Age" and "Cherub", which polled at number four in Triple J's Hottest 100 of 2020.

A commercial success, Ball Park Music debuted at number 2 on the ARIA Albums Chart, received Australian Album of the Year at the 2020 J Awards, and was nominated for Album of the Year at the 2021 Queensland Music Awards, Best Independent Release and Best Rock Album at the 2021 ARIA Awards.

== Background ==
A week prior to the announcement of the album, the band's 2011 single "It's Nice to Be Alive" placed at number 17 in Triple J's Hottest 100 of the 2010s. The band's guitarist Dean Hanson discussed the result whilst premiering lead single "Spark Up!" on the station's breakfast program, Breakfast with Sally and Erica, stating:

"[It's] so good. We could not be happier to see the company that our little song is in, with some big hitters of the decade. I think we all know we're in a simulation at the moment but that solidifies it for us."

== Recording ==
The band began recording the album in October 2019 at the beginning of the 2019–20 Australian bushfire season. The album was primarily recorded in Stafford, Brisbane.

=== Recording locations ===
Main recording locations

- Prawn HQ (Ball Park Music's home studio), Brisbane, Queensland – vocals, mixing
- Free Energy Device, Sydney, New South Wales – mixing
- King Willy Sound, Launceston, Tasmania – mastering

Additional recording locations

- Jennifer Boyce's bedroom, Sydney, New South Wales – additional vocals

== Release ==
Lead single "Spark Up!" was released on 19 March 2020, alongside the announcement their forthcoming record would be titled Mostly Sunny. This name would later be changed eponymously on 23 April, after the band decided the initial title did not match the overall theme of the album. The album artwork designed by Polly Bass Boost and band member Dean Hanson was issued alongside the announcement. In an interview with Triple J, keyboardist Paul Furness elaborated on the decision to change the title:

Mostly Sunny didn't feel right for a number of reasons. We always did like the title – it had a similar rhythm to it as Good Mood and felt like a continuation. As we've finished this album we've realised, it's really not a continuation of Good Mood. It is its own thing with a different emotional palette.

On 5 June 2020, second single "Day & Age" was released. On 16 August, the band performed "Day & Age" live from the Black Bear Lodge bar in Brisbane for Australian live music program The Sound. On 3 August, the band began selling face masks branded with the album's cover artwork following a Tweet parodying the chorus of "Spark Up!", with the lyrics "Life is short / The doors are shut / I say we mask up".

The record's final single "Cherub" was issued on 28 August. The band performed the track live from Prawn Records HQ on 11 September for NME Australia. All three singles had been premiered by Triple J prior to their digital releases.

Ball Park Music was released on 23 October 2020 through Prawn Records and Inertia Music in digital and physical formats. The same day, the band performed live on Triple J's Like a Version segment, performing a cover of Radiohead's "Paranoid Android" alongside their original track "Cherub".

== Commercial performance ==
On 28 October 2020, Australian Recording Industry Association (ARIA) announced in their mid-week report that the album was in contention to debut within the top 10 on the ARIA Albums Chart. On 31 October 2020, Ball Park Music debuted and peaked at number 2 on the ARIA Albums Chart for the chart dated 2 November 2020, tying with Puddinghead (2014) as their highest peak in the region.

== Awards and nominations ==
=== AIR Awards ===
Year	Nominee / work	Award	Result	Ref.
2021	Ball Park Music	Independent Album of the Year	Nominated	

=== J Awards ===
Year	Nominee / work	Award	Result	Ref.
2020	Ball Park Music	Australian Album of the Year	Nominated	

=== Queensland Music Awards ===
Year	Nominee / work	Award	Result	Ref.
2021	Ball Park Music	Album of the Year	Won	

== Track listing ==
All tracks are written by Sam Cromack, unless otherwise noted.

Ball Park Music track listing
No.	Title	Writer(s)	Length
1.	"Spark Up!"		4:19
2.	"Head Like a Sieve"		2:42
3.	"Nothing Ever Goes My Way"	Sam Cromack; Dean Hanson	3:40
4.	"I Feel Nothing"		3:54
5.	"Bedroom"		3:16
6.	"Katkit"	Cromack; Hanson; Daniel Hanson; Paul Furness	1:24
7.	"Cherub"		5:28
8.	"Bad Taste Blues, Pt. III"		4:18
9.	"Obit 2020"		3:08
10.	"Day & Age"		3:50
11.	"Turning Zero"		3:08
Total length:			38:59

== Personnel ==
Adapted from the album's liner notes.

=== Musicians ===
Ball Park Music

- Sam Cromack – writing, vocals, guitar, synthesiser, shaker (1–11)
- Jennifer Boyce – vocals, bass guitar, kazoo (1–11)
- Daniel Hanson – writing (6), drums, tambourine, wheelbarrow, bongos, vocals (1–11)
- Dean Hanson – writing (3, 6), guitar, vocals, bass guitar (1–11)
- Paul Furness – writing (6), piano, rhodes, trombone, synthesiser, mellotron, tambourine, vocals (1–11)

Other musicians

- Tom Myers – additional vocals (9, 11)
- Florence the Dog – "panting" (4)

=== Technical ===
- Paul McKercher – mixing (1–5, 7–11)
- Sam Cromack – mixing (6)
- William Bowden – mastering (1–11)

=== Artwork ===
- Polly Bass Boost – artwork, design
- Dean Hanson – artwork, design, photography

== Charts ==
Chart performance for Ball Park Music
Chart (2020)	Peak position
Australian Albums (ARIA)	2
