= Every Night the Same Dream =

Fourth studio album by Australian indie pop band Ball Park Music

Studio album by Ball Park Music
- Released: 19 August 2016
- Studio: Sound Recordings, Castlemaine, Victoria & Sixth Ave Studio, Queensland
- Genre: Indie rock; psychedelic rock
- Length: 41:43
- Label: Stop Start/Inertia
- Producer: Ball Park Music

Ball Park Music chronology
Puddinghead (2014)	Every Night the Same Dream (2016)	Good Mood (2018)

Singles from Every Night the Same Dream
- 1. "Pariah" Released: 27 April 2016; 2. "Nihilist Party Anthem" Released: 16 May 2016; 3. "Whipping Boy" Released: 5 August 2016

Every Night the Same Dream is the fourth studio album by Australian indie pop band Ball Park Music. It was released on 19 August 2016 and peaked at number three on the ARIA Charts. The album's psychedelic rock-influenced sound marks a significant sonic departure from their previous record, Puddinghead (2014).

== Composition ==
The album was noted for its "unpredictable", "explorative" sound taking influence from a range of genres including psychedelic rock, acoustic rock and grunge. This stands in contrast to their previous record from 2014, Puddinghead, "an album full of outrageous pop hooks and sleek production".

The band's longest song and lead single "Pariah" is described as a "moody, seven-minute aural journey" recorded from a live jam session. Online publication AAA Backstage found "Leef" to have similar elements to tracks from Ball Park Music's debut album Happiness and Surrounding Suburbs (2011), with the author calling it one of "the band’s most beautiful song[s]". The closing track "Suit Yourself", is described as a softer jam with a "pulsating, glitchy, emotion-filled" vocal delivery.

Margy Noble of The AU Review noted a change in sonic direction half-way through the album, writing it "ought to be listened to on vinyl" as "there’s a real feel that the record has been flipped, and you’re about to discover the treasures of the B side".

== Reception ==
Professional ratings
Review scores
Source	Rating
AAA Backstage	4.5/5 stars
The AU Review	8.2/10
Forte	4/5 stars

Some critics, including Noble, called Every Night the Same Dream the band's best album yet. She elaborated in an 8.2 out of 10 review: "It's an unpredictable, heartfelt LP, where you'll fall between progressive psych-rock jams, indie rock and pop ballads". Writing for Music Feeds, Zanda Wilson said the album is "easily Ball Park Music's biggest achievement to date". Beat Magazine called the album "a stand out record for 2016".

== Track listing ==
No.	Title	Writer(s)	Length
1.	"Feelings"	Sam Cromack; Paul Furness	4:28
2.	"Ever Since I Turned the Lights On"	Cromack; Jennifer Boyce	2:46
3.	"Whipping Boy"	Cromack; Dean Hanson; Daniel Hanson	2:48
4.	"Pariah"	Cromack	7:11
5.	"Nihilist Party Anthem"	Cromack	3:44
6.	"Peppy"	Cromack	5:05
7.	"Leef"	Cromack	3:30
8.	"Don't Look At Me Like That"	Cromack; Furness	3:45
9.	"Blushing"	Dean Hanson	4:09
10.	"Suit Yourself"	Cromack; Daniel Hanson	4:13
Total length:			41:43

== Personnel ==
Musicians

- Sam Cromack – lead vocals, lead guitar, writing
- Jennifer Boyce – backing vocals, bass guitar, writing
- Daniel Hanson – drums, writing
- Dean Hanson – rhythm guitar, bass guitar, writing
- Paul Furness – string arrangements, writing
- Daniel Lopez – violin
- Eleanor Streatfeild – cello

Additional personnel

- Matt Redlich – producer, mixing, recording, engineering
- Alex Bennett – engineer
- Sam Cromack – producer, recording
- William Bowden – mastering
- Polly Bass Boost – art direction, paintings
- Stuart McConaghy – paintings
- Dean Hanson – photography
- Dave Homer – layout, design

== Charts ==
Chart (2016)	Peak position
Australian Albums (ARIA)	3
