= The Long Now (album) =

Studio album by Children Collide
- Released: 11 October 2008
- Recorded: Hillside Manor & Sunset Sound, Los Angeles, California
- Genre: Rock, indie rock, post-punk
- Length: 42:35
- Label: Universal
- Producer: D. Sardy

Children Collide chronology
The Long Now (2008)	Theory of Everything (2010)

Singles from The Long Now
- 1. "Social Currency" Released: 19 July 2008; 2. "Skeleton Dance" Released: 2008; 3. "Farewell Rocketship" Released: 2008; 4. "Chosen Armies" Released: 2009

The Long Now is the debut studio album by Australian indie rock band Children Collide. The album was produced by David Sardy, and was released by Universal in Australia on 11 October 2008. The Special Collector's Edition of the album features a circle on the cover with a sticker stating: "Scratch the circle to reveal 1 of 3 cover versions."

== Track listing ==
No.	Title	Length
1.	"Across the Earth"	3:56
2.	"Social Currency"	3:53
3.	"Farewell Rocketship"	3:45
4.	"Skeleton Dance"	3:31
5.	"Seasons Changing"	3:07
6.	"Marie Marie, Pt. 2"	4:11
7.	"Chosen Armies"	4:26
8.	"Cannibal"	3:37
9.	"We Live in Fear"	2:49
10.	"Economy"	2:01
11.	"Brave Robot"	3:45
12.	"Devil's Child"	3:29

== Personnel ==
- Johnny Mackay – vocals, guitar
- Heath Crawley – bass
- Ryan Caesar – drums

== Charts ==
Charts (2008)	Peak position
Australian ARIA Albums Chart	74
