= Children Collide =

Australian indie rock band

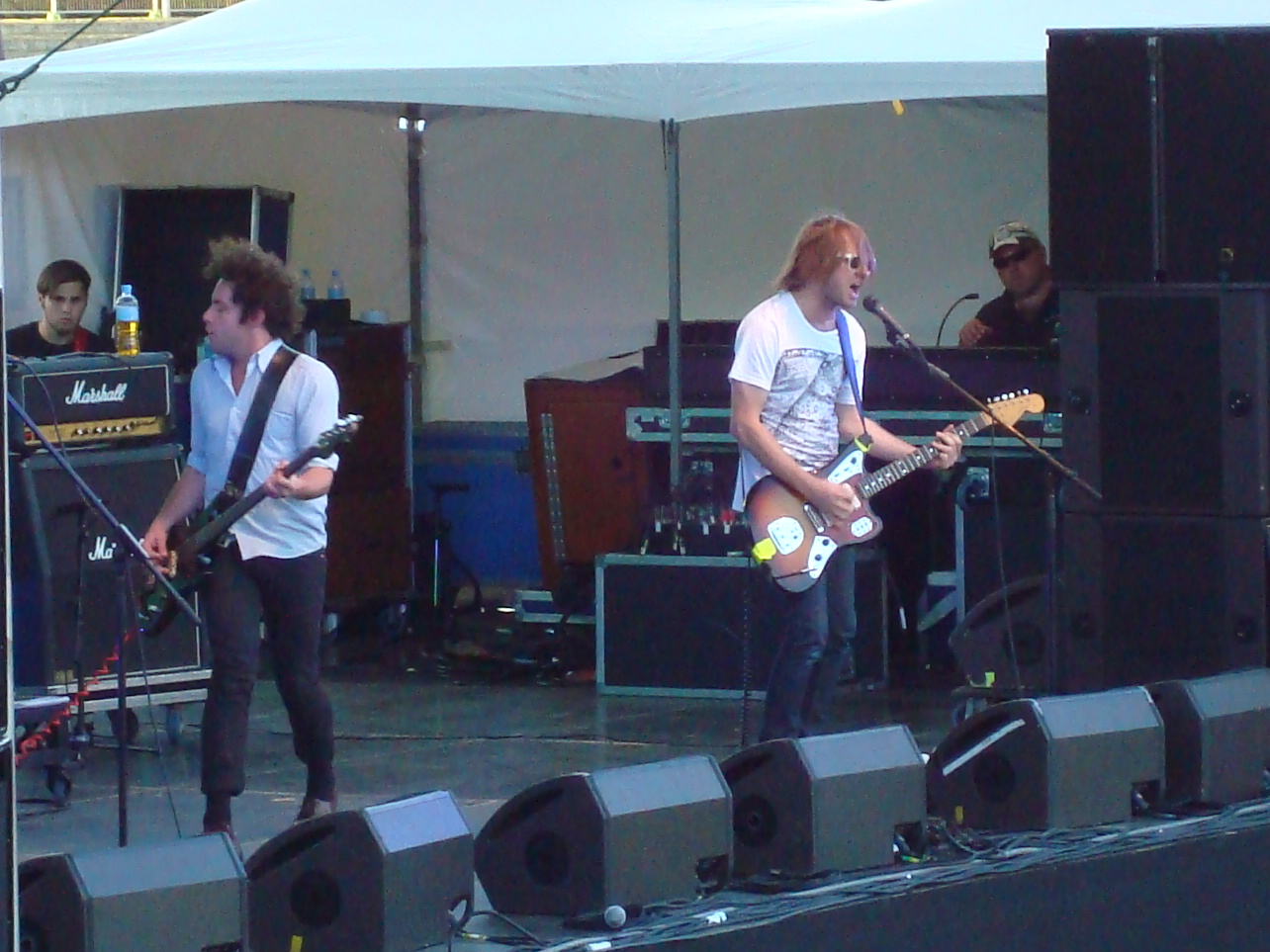
- Children Collide at the V Festival in Perth, 2009.

Background information
- Origin: Melbourne, Victoria, Australia
- Genres: Indie rock
- Years active: 2005–2012, 2014, 2019–present
- Labels: Universal, Dine Alone
- Members: Johnny Mackay; Ryan Caesar; Chelsea Wheatley
- Past members: Heath Crawley; Steph Hughes
- Website: childrencollide.band

Children Collide is an Australian indie rock band from Melbourne, Australia. The band consisted of bassist Heath Crawley and vocalist/guitarist Johnny Mackay throughout its initial run. Their former drummer, Ryan Caesar, quit the band in February 2012.

== History ==
Children Collide released their debut EP We Three, Brave and True in 2005.

Their debut album, The Long Now was released on 11 October 2008 and was produced by David Sardy. "Farewell Rocketship" came in at number 66 on the Triple J Hottest 100, 2008

The trio appeared at Triple J's One Night Stand 2009 held in Sale, Victoria, Australia, alongside Hilltop Hoods, Eskimo Joe, and The Butterfly Effect. Their song "Social Currency" was the theme song for the Nine Network's Friday Night Football coverage of the NRL.

Children Collide appeared at the second annual Coaster Music Festival on 12 September 2009, at Gosford Showground on the NSW Central Coast. They appeared alongside Eskimo Joe, Bliss N Eso, Does It Offend You, Yeah?, Van She, and British India.

Their track "Skeleton Dance", remixed by Ladytron, has been included in a downloadable soundtrack for the EA Sports game FIFA 10 and 2K Sports game NBA 2K11.

The band premiered their single "Jellylegs" with The Doctor on Triple J. It had premiered on the 20 May 2010 show.

Theory of Everything was voted Triple J listeners 18th favorite album of 2010. The band appeared twice more in the Triple J Hottest 100, 2010 with "My Eagle" at 60 and "Jellylegs" at 22.

The band ended in 2012, with the departure of drummer Ryan Caeser, weeks before the launch and national tour for their third album Monument, stating, "touring as a unit is no longer pleasant, and that is that".

In August 2021, Children Collide released their fourth studio album Time Itself. It's the first album from the trio since reuniting in 2019.

== Discography ==
=== Studio albums ===
List of studio albums, with selected chart positions and certifications
Title	Album details	Peak chart positions
Title	Album details	AUS
The Long Now	Released: October 2008; Label: Universal Music Australia (1779565); Formats: CD, LP, download	74
Theory of Everything	Released: August 2010; Label: Universal Music Australia (2744938); Formats: CD, download	5
Monument	Released: April 2012; Label: Universal Music Australia (2795861); Formats: CD, download	16
Time Itself	Released: 27 August 2021; Label: Spinning Top (STR024-C1); Format: CD, DD, LP, streaming	—

=== Extended plays ===
List of extended plays
Title	Details
We Three, Brave and True	Released: 2005; Label: Reverberation (REV021); Format: CD, DD
Glass Mountain Liars	Released: November 2006; Label: Flying Nun Records, Warner Music Australia (5101179222); Format: CD, DD

=== Singles ===
Title	Year	Peak chart positions	Album
Title	Year	AUS	Album
"We Are Amphibious"	2006	-	Glass Mountain Liars
"Social Currency"	2008	-	The Long Now
"Skeleton Dance"	2008	-	The Long Now
"Farewell Rocketship"	2008	-	The Long Now
"Chosen Armies"	2009	-	The Long Now
"Jellylegs"	2010	72	Theory of Everything
"My Eagle"	2010	-	Theory of Everything
"Arrows"	2011	-	Theory of Everything
"Loveless"	2011	-	Theory of Everything
"Sword to a Gun Fight"	2011	-	Monument
"Cherries"	2012	-	Monument
"Praying For Sunshine"	2012	-	Monument
"Aurora"	2019	-	Time Itself
"Funeral for a Ghost"	2021	-	Time Itself
"Trampoline"	2021	-	Time Itself

== Awards and nominations ==
=== ARIA Music Awards ===
The ARIA Music Awards is an annual awards ceremony that recognises excellence, innovation, and achievement across all genres of Australian music.

Year	Nominee / work	Award	Result
2011	Theory of Everything	Best Rock Album	Nominated
2011	"Loveless" (directors David Michod and Flood Projects)	Best Video	Nominated
2012	Monument	Best Rock Album	Nominated

=== J Award ===
The J Awards are an annual series of Australian music awards that were established by the Australian Broadcasting Corporation's youth-focused radio station Triple J. They commenced in 2005.

Year	Nominee / work	Award	Result
2011	"Loveless"	Australian Video of the Year	Nominated
