= Area-7 =

Australian alternative rock band

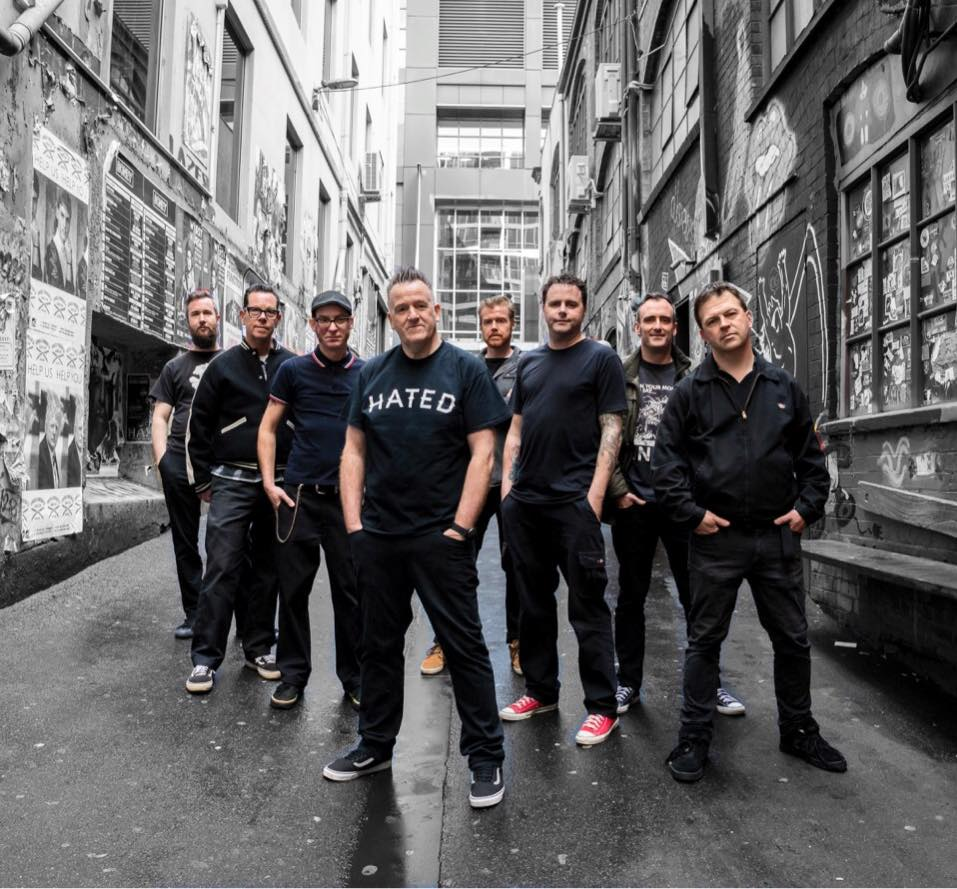
- Area-7 in 2018

Background information
- Origin: Melbourne, Victoria, Australia
- Genres: Pop-punk, third wave ska, ska punk
- Years active: 1994–present
- Labels: Zomba, Jive, Shock
- Members: John "Stevo" Stevens; David 'DJ' Jackson; Charles "Chucky T" Thompson; Andy Gardiner; Paul West; Dennis "Ocker" O'Connell; Warren Lenthall; Aaron Schultz; Dean Gilboy
- Past members: Walter Eskdale; Ivan Downey; Rohan Pacey; Alistair "Albags" Shepherd; Toby "Tobias" Dargaville; Chris Meighen; Dugald "Doogs" McNaughtan; Matt Sanders; Craig Selak; Dan Morrison (deceased)
- Website: Area-7 on Myspace

Area-7 (also known as Area 7) are an Australian ska punk band. Formed in Melbourne in 1994, they have released four studio albums, No Logic!, Bitter & Twisted, Say It To My Face and Torn Apart. At the ARIA Music Awards of 2000, Bitter & Twisted was nominated for ARIA Award for Best Rock Album.

== History ==
Area-7 was formed in 1994 by members of Madness cover band Mad Not Madness. In 1994 four members, Ivan Downey, Dugald "Doogs" McNaughtan (keyboards), Charles "Chucky T" Thompson (guitar) and Dan Morrison (drums) left the group and began to write their own songs. In 1994, Area-7 self-released a cassette titled Demo Tape 1994 featuring 4 tracks. Alistair Shepherd (sax), Toby Dargaville (trumpet) and Rohan Pacey (bass) joined in 1995 and the same year released their debut studio album No Logic.

In 2000, the group released Bitter & Twisted, which at the ARIA Music Awards of 2000 was nominated for ARIA Award for Best Rock Album.

In October 2001, the group released Say It to My Face which peaked at number 36 on the ARIA charts.

Whilst AREA-7 has never "officially split", since 2005 the band has been playing "when they feel like it" or as they put it, "for special occasions".

Drummer and founding member Dan Morrison died on 1 December 2020.

== Discography ==
=== Albums ===
List of studio albums, with selected details and peak chart positions
Title	Album details	Peak chart positions
Title	Album details	AUS
No Logic	Released:1995; Label: Moon Ska Australia	—
Bitter & Twisted	Released: March 2000; Label: Trademark (TM007)	6
Say It to My Face	Released: October 2001; Label: Trademark / Jive (TM012)	36
Torn Apart	Released: 2005; Label: Shock (A7003)	—

=== Extended plays ===
List of extended plays
Title	EP details
Demo Tape 1994	Released: 1994; Label: Independent
Road Rage	Released: 1997; Label: Independent

=== Singles ===
List of singles, with selected peak chart positions
Title	Year	Chart positions	Album
Title	Year	AUS	Album
"Bitter Words"	1998	59	Bitter & Twisted
"Second Class Citizen"	1999	29	Bitter & Twisted
"Start Making Sense"	2000	37	Bitter & Twisted
"Bitter Words" / "Himbo"	2000	67	Bitter & Twisted
"Leave Me Alone"	2001	38	Say It to My Face
"Individuality"	2001	90	Say It to My Face
"Nobody Likes a Bogan"	2002	46	Say It to My Face
"Big Issue"	2004	92	Torn Apart
