= Road Rage (EP) =

EP by Area-7
- Released: 1997
- Recorded: Atlantis Recording, Hawthorn, February 1997
- Genre: Ska, rock
- Length: 19:10
- Producer: David McCuny, Area-7

Area-7 chronology
No Logic (1995)	Road Rage (1997)	Bitter & Twisted (2000)

Road Rage is an extended play by Australian ska band Area-7. The instrumentation on the album includes horns.

== Track listing ==
1. "Road Rage"
2. "Disarray"
3. "Skin Deep"
4. "Soul Stomper"
5. "Peter Mac"
6. "B.A. Song"
7. "Healthy Body (Sick Mind)"^{*}

^{*}Healthy Body (Sick Mind) is a cover of a song originally recorded by Operation Ivy.
