= Museum (Ball Park Music album) =

Studio album by Ball Park Music
- Released: 5 October 2012
- Recorded: January – August 2012
- Studios: Massive, East Brisbane
- Genre: Indie pop
- Length: 41:49
- Label: Stop Start/EMI
- Producer: Matt Redlich

Ball Park Music chronology
Happiness and Surrounding Suburbs (2011)	Museum (2012)	Puddinghead (2014)

Singles from Happiness and Surrounding Suburbs
- 1. "Surrender" Released: 24 July 2012; 2. "Coming Down" Released: 2012

Museum is the second studio album by Australian indie pop band, Ball Park Music. It was released in Australia and New Zealand on 5 October 2012 via Stop Start/EMI Music Australia. Matt Redlich recorded, produced and mixed the album at Massive Studios, East Brisbane, Queensland, between January and August 2012. It was preceded by the lead single, "Surrender", which was released in July 2012.

At the J Awards of 2012, the album was nominated for Australian Album of the Year.

A tour edition was released on 7 June 2013, with eight live tracks.

== Background ==
The album was released 13 months after their debut album. Their record label issued a statement, "Inspired by the swift turn around in which the likes of The Beatles would deliver new records every six to 12 months, frontman Sam Cromack issued his band of cohorts a challenge to release another album within the year."

== Critical response ==
Response to the album was generally favourable. Youth radio station, Triple J, made it their Feature Album in the week after its release and played nine of its 12 tracks: "Fence Sitter", "Surrender", "Coming Down", "Bad Taste Blues, Pt 1", Bad Taste Blues, Pt 2", 'Great Display of Patience", "Pot of Gold" and "High Court". It was also nominated for Triple J's Album of the Year (or J Award) for 2012 with their reviewer explaining, "[it] delivers more of those sing-along jams and hooks you whistle for days, while still pushing the BPM sound forward. It's a little more depressing than their debut, say bandmates Jen and Sam. 'But there's still plenty of silly stuff"', they're quick to add."

The album debuted on the ARIA chart at number 9.

== Track listing ==
Standard edition All music and lyrics written by Samuel David Cromack:

1. "Fence Sitter" – 3:10
2. "Surrender" – 2:59
3. "Coming Down" – 3:34
4. "Bad Taste Blues, Pt. 1" – 3:11
5. "Bad Taste Blues, Pt. 2" – 3:27
6. "Cry with One Eye" – 2:38
7. "Great Display of Patience" – 3:21
8. "High Court" – 3:51
9. "Pot of Gold" – 3:26
10. "Cost of Lifestyle" – 3:21
11. "Harbour of Lame Ducks" – 3:40
12. "What's on Your Mind?" – 5:16

Tour edition disc 2: Live at Manning Bar

1. "Cost of Lifestyle" – 5:11
2. "Fence Sitter" – 3:21
3. "Surrender" – 3:52
4. "Bad Taste Blues (Part 2)" – 4:13
5. "All I Want Is You" – 3:49
6. "Literally Baby" – 4:16
7. "It's Nice to Be Alive" – 3:52
8. "Sad Rude Future Dude" – 2:38

== Personnel ==
Credits Ball Park Music

- Jennifer Boyce – bass guitar, keytar, backing vocals
- Sam Cromack – guitar, vocals
- Paul Furness – keyboards, trombone
- Daniel Hanson – drums, backing vocals
- Dean Hanson – guitar, bass guitar, backing vocals

Technical

- Matt Redlich – producer, engineer, mixer at Massive Studios, East Brisbane
- William Bowden – mastering at King Willy Sound

Graphics

- Robert Koch, Polly Bass Boost, Myfanwy Kernke – artwork

== Charts ==
Chart (2012)	Peak position
Australian Albums (ARIA)	9

== Release history ==
Region	Date	Format	Edition(s)	Label	Catalogue
Australia	5 October 2012	CD; LP; digital download	Standard	Stop Start / EMI	SSM36 /SSM41
Australia	7 June 2013	2x CD; digital download	Platinum	Stop Start / EMI	SSM61CD
