= Monument (Children Collide album) =

Studio album by Children Collide
- Released: 20 April 2012
- Recorded: 10 October–16 December 2011 at Red Door Studios
- Genres: Rock, alternative rock
- Length: 44:19
- Label: Universal Music Australia
- Producer: Woody Annison

Children Collide chronology
Theory of Everything (2010)	Monument (2012)

Singles from Monument
- 1. "Sword to a Gunfight" Released: 2011; 2. "Cherries" Released: 2012; 3. "Praying For Sunshine" Released: 2012

Monument is the third album by alternative rock band Children Collide. Its release was announced just after lead single 'Sword to a Gunfight' was premiered on the Triple J breakfast show with Tom Ballard and Alex Dyson. It was made the Triple J feature album from 10 to 17 April.

The album cover was designed by Isobel Knowles

This is the last album to feature drummer Ryan Caesar. His departure was announced on 29 February 2012.

== Track listing ==
No.	Title	Length
1.	"The Flat Earth"	2:54
2.	"Sword to a Gunfight"	3:24
3.	"Cherries"	2:57
4.	"Black Lemon"	4:26
5.	"Praying For Sunshine"	3:45
6.	"Prussian Blue"	4:59
7.	"My Heart Came Alive"	4:17
8.	"The Mausoleum"	3:55
9.	"Summer Assassin"	3:18
10.	"Sphere of Influence"	1:10
11.	"Smooth Gown"	4:12
12.	"Tired Eyes"	5:02

iTunes bonus track
No.	Title	Length
13.	"Monument"	5:24

CD bonus track
No.	Title	Length
13.	"Terrible Lizard"	3:46

== Charts ==
Chart (2012)	Peak position
Australian Albums (ARIA)	16
