= She Only Loves Me When I'm There =

2014 song by Ball Park Music

Single by Ball Park Music

from the album Puddinghead
- Released: 14 February 2014
- Length: 3:45
- Label: Stop Start

Ball Park Music singles chronology
"Coming Down" (2012)	"She Only Loves Me When I'm There" (2014)	"Trippin' the Light Fantastic" (2014)

Music video
- "She Only Loves Me When I'm There" on YouTube

"She Only Loves Me When I'm There" is a song by Australian indie rock band Ball Park Music, released on 14 February 2014 as the lead single from their third studio album Puddinghead. The song debuted and peaked at number 70, becoming the band's first song to chart on the ARIA top 100. The song was certified platinum in Australia in 2021.

== Charts ==
Chart performance for "She Only Loves Me When I'm There"
Chart (2014)	Peak position
Australia (ARIA)	70

== Certifications ==
Region	Certification	Certified units/sales
Australia (ARIA)	Platinum	70,000^{‡}
^{‡} Sales+streaming figures based on certification alone.
