= I Want That You Are Always Happy =

Studio album by The Middle East
- Released: 8 April 2011
- Genre: Indie folk, post-rock, ambient
- Length: 62:50
- Label: Spunk Records
- Producer: Mark Myers

The Middle East chronology
The Recordings of the Middle East (2008)	I Want That You Are Always Happy (2011)

Singles from I Want That You Are Always Happy
- 1. "Hunger Song" Released: 6 June 2011

I Want That You Are Always Happy is the debut studio album by Australian folk band The Middle East, released in Australia and New Zealand through Spunk Records on 8 April 2011. The album was recorded, mixed and co-produced by Mark Myers. Only one single, "Hunger Song", was released for the album. The album debuted and peaked at number 11 on the Australian Album Chart and remained on the chart for five weeks.

At the J Awards of 2011, the album was nominated for Australian Album of the Year.

At the Queensland Music Awards of 2011, the album won Album of the Year.

== Writing and recording ==
I Want That You Are Always Happy was produced between tours in three studios over the course of 2010: Mark Myers' Townsville studio in late 2009/early 2010. Midlake's Denton Studios in March/April 2010. Mark Myers' Cairns studio, from August to November 2010. The album was recorded, mixed and co-produced by Mark Myers. Mark Myers' Cairns studio was built by the band and it was where they recorded a majority of the album.

The band members did consider self-producing the record however found they had a lack of experience and knowledge in production. Rohin Jones spoke about how the band was never pleased with the final product and kept restarting, which lead to them recording throughout the year: "we scrapped it and then tried it again and scrapped that and tried it again and scrapped that, so we've really pieced it together over time. And maybe that's just how we work and we haven't come to terms with it yet, but it's definitely not the best process for writing an album."

Jordan Ireland was critical about the album: "With this album I don't really feel like we nailed it, we're definitely falling into a lot of categories that've been done before and I don't feel like it's anything completely original or anything like that, but that's kind of the goal that we're heading towards."

== Reception ==
Professional ratings
Review scores
Source	Rating
RHUM	5/5 stars
theAUreview	8/10 stars
The Brag	5/5 stars

The album peaked at number 11 on the Australian Album Chart.

== Track listing ==
No.	Title	Length
1.	"Black Death 1349"	2:59
2.	"My Grandma Was Pearl Hall"	5:31
3.	"As I Go To See Janey"	4:04
4.	"Jesus Came To My Birthday Party"	3:11
5.	"Land Of The Bloody Unknown"	3:15
6.	"Very Many"	5:32
7.	"Sydney To Newcastle"	2:36
8.	"Mount Morgan"	5:14
9.	"Months"	4:00
10.	"Dan's Silverleaf"	4:15
11.	"Hunger Song"	4:21
12.	"Ninth Avenue Reverie"	4:58
13.	"Deep Water"	8:19
14.	"Mount Morgan End"	3:13

iTunes bonus track
No.	Title	Length
15.	"My Baby"	5:15

== Chart performance ==
Chart performance for I Want That You Are Always Happy
Chart (2011)	Peak position
Australian Albums (ARIA)	11
