= The Middle East (band) =

Australian indie folk band

- Origin: Townsville, Queensland, Australia
- Genres: Indie folk; post-rock; ambient
- Years active: 2005–2008; 2009–2011; 2019; 2023–2024
- Label: Spunk! Records
- Past members: Jordan Ireland; Rohin Jones; Bree Tranter; Joseph Ireland; Mark Myers; Jack Saltmiras; Mike Haydon; Tim Barwise; Javed Sterritt; Jared Jones

The Middle East were an Australian indie folk band that formed in Townsville, Queensland in 2005. The group garnered attention initially by playing small shows in their home town and quickly grew to national and international fame due to their rising popularity on music blogs and websites. In early 2008, the band released their home recorded first album called The Recordings of The Middle East. The band split up before reconvening in 2009 and signing to Australian indie label Spunk Records who re-issued The Recordings Of The Middle East.

The Middle East's first studio album, I Want That You Are Always Happy was released in Australia and New Zealand on 8 April 2011. The band then played what was intended to be its last show on 31 July 2011, at the Splendour in the Grass festival in Woodford, Queensland. The group have, however, reunited twice since then: once in 2019, and again in 2023.

== History ==
The band was formed by vocalist and guitarist Rohin Jones circa 2005, intended initially as a way to spend the summer of 2005-2006 making music with friends. The band's name was initially of no significance and was coined for a show poster of the then temporary project. The name was then kept and grew to significance as a reference to their geographical location on the east coast of their native state of Queensland. The lack of stylistically similar bands in Townsville meant the group frequently opened for local punk and hardcore bands at house shows, skating rinks, and DIY underage concerts, including opening for hardcore band Parkway Drive at James Cook University. The band separated in 2008 after guitarist Jordan Ireland relocated to Europe, and reconvened in 2009 after his return to support Bill Callahan at Melbourne's Thornbury Theatre.

The most popular song on the EP, "Blood", written in 2006 by Jordan Ireland about three generations of his family, came to be the band's signature song. It went on to be featured in the films It's Kind of a Funny Story (2010), Crazy, Stupid, Love (2011), Accidents Happen (2009), Jeff, Who Lives at Home (2011) and A Perfect Pairing (2022). With the release of The Recordings of the Middle East, Pitchfork offered a free download of the song "The Darkest Side" as a part of its weekly "Forkcast".

After signing with Australian Indie label Spunk! Records in early 2009, the band toured Australia extensively with fellow Spunk artist Emma Russack whilst continuing to write new music and undergoing several line-up changes.

2009 also saw The Middle East receive national airplay on Triple J and win the Australian radio station's Unearthed Artist of the Year Award. The band also went on to play several major Australian festivals such as Splendour in the Grass, Big Day Out, Big Sound, Homebake, Laneway, Meredith, Falls Festival and the Woodford Folk Festival. and received interest in the United States, where The Recordings of The Middle East was released.

Throughout 2010 the band toured extensively in the USA and Europe with Beach House, and Laura Marling as well as opening for Pavement. They also played slots on several major festivals such as Coachella, Fuji Rock, Bonnaroo, Sasquatch Music Festival, and Eurockéennes.

The band self-recorded the majority of their album I Want That You Are Always Happy in various houses and studios across the USA during downtime between shows with the majority being recorded in Denton, Texas. After returning home in 2010 the band also toured locally in Australia with Cat Power, and British group Doves.

Band members announced at Splendour in the Grass festival in August 2011 that their set that night would be their "last show ever." They released a statement to fans, explaining why the band had broken up by saying: "we don't feel like playing together any more for a whole lot of reasons that I won't list here and I'm afraid if we continue any longer it would just be a money grab." FasterLouder reported that the band thanked all in attendance, saying "it makes it special for us." Triple J presenter Dom Alessio reacted to the news on Twitter, adding that it was "an amazing band cutting it short before their time."

In March 2019, it was confirmed that the band would return for two nights only to perform at the Sydney Opera House as a part of Vivid Live to celebrate the 20th anniversary of Spunk Records. The band were joined by Jack Ladder, Holly Throsby, Machine Translations, The Ocean Party (playing their final show) and Emma Russack.

In August 2023, it was announced that the band would be opening for some of the dates on Zach Bryan's 2024 U.S. tour. These marked the first shows that the band had performed outside of Australia in 14 years. The band also again performed two shows at the Sydney Opera House in May 2024 for the final Spunk Records shows, alongside Explosions in the Sky and Aldous Harding.

== Musical style ==
The Middle East has been described as playing within "a multitude of genres and styles". Elements of country, blues, punk, rock, folk, chamber pop, psych folk, post-rock and ambience can be found throughout its music. Allmusic describes the band's sound as "lush, orchestral indie pop that blends the epic atmospherics of modern rock outfits like Múm and Sigur Rós with the earthy simplicity of modern indie folk". Instruments used include guitar—both electric and acoustic, drums, hand percussion, piano, glockenspiel, banjo and trumpet. Another distinguishing feature of the band's music is the use of vocal harmony—in particular close harmony performed at times by several members. Pitchfork described some The Middle East songs as being " simple, finger-plucked acoustic affair with alternating and harmonizing vocals that lend the hushed track a sense of beleaguered hope".

The band, however, has always been critical of itself and its style, believing as an entity it had yet to do anything unique and was too easy to pigeonhole.

== Discography ==
=== Studio albums ===
Title	Details	Peak chart positions
Title	Details	AUS
I Want That You Are Always Happy	Released: 8 April 2011; Label: Spunk (URA312); Format: CD, LP, digital download	11

=== Compilation albums ===
Title	Details
Songs of The Middle East	Released: 2024; Label: The Middle East, Impressed Recordings (IMP102 ); Format: LP (limitted)

=== Extended plays ===
Title	Details
The Recordings of the Middle East	Released: 2008; Label: The Middle East; Format: CD, DD

=== Singles ===
Title	Year	Album
"The Darkest Side"	2009	The Recordings of the Middle East
"Jesus Came to My Birthday Party"	2010	I Want That You Are Always Happy
"Hunger Song"	2011	I Want That You Are Always Happy

== Awards and nominations ==
=== APRA Awards ===
The APRA Awards are presented annually from 1982 by the Australasian Performing Right Association (APRA), "honouring composers and songwriters". They commenced in 1982.

Year	Nominee / work	Award	Result	Ref.
2010	"Blood" (Jordan Ireland, Rohin Jones)	Song of the Year	Shortlisted	

=== ARIA Music Awards ===
The ARIA Music Awards is an annual awards ceremony that recognises excellence, innovation, and achievement across all genres of Australian music.

Year	Nominee / work	Award	Result
2011	I Want That You Are Always Happy	Breakthrough Artist - Album	Nominated

=== Australian Music Prize ===
The Australian Music Prize (the AMP) is an annual award of $30,000 given to an Australian band or solo artist in recognition of the merit of an album released during the year of award. It commenced in 2005.

Year	Nominee / work	Award	Result
2011	I Want That You Are Always Happy	Australian Music Prize	Won

=== J Awards ===
The J Awards are an annual series of Australian music awards that were established by the Australian Broadcasting Corporation's youth-focused radio station Triple J. They commenced in 2005.

Year	Nominee / work	Award	Result
2009	themselves	Unearthed Artist of the Year	Won
2011	I Want That You Are Always Happy	Australian Album of the Year	Nominated

=== Queensland Music Awards ===
The Queensland Music Awards (previously known as Q Song Awards) are annual awards celebrating Queensland, Australia's brightest emerging artists and established legends. They commenced in 2006.

Year	Nominee / work	Award	Result (wins only)
2011	I Want That You Are Always Happy	Album of the Year	Won
