= Please Don't Move to Melbourne =

Single by Ball Park Music

from the album Like Love
- Released: 6 February 2025
- Recorded: 2024
- Genre: Indie rock, indie pop
- Label: Prawn Records
- Songwriter: Sam Cromack

Ball Park Music singles chronology
"Like Love" (2025)	"Please Don't Move to Melbourne" (2025)	"Coast Is Clear" (2026)

"Please Don't Move to Melbourne" is a song by Australian indie rock band Ball Park Music. It was released on 6 February 2025 as the second single from their eighth studio album, Like Love.

At the APRA Music Awards of 2026, the song was nominated for Most Performed Australian Work and won Most Performed Alternative Work.

== Background and meaning ==
The song was written by Ball Park Music frontman Sam Cromack and originated several years prior to its official release. Cromack has stated that the chorus was written long before the band began work on Like Love, and it was later revisited and expanded during the album's recording sessions.

Despite its title, Cromack has explained that the song is not intended as a criticism of Melbourne. Instead, the city name functions as a stand-in for the broader experience of watching close friends or loved ones move away. He stated that the sentiment of the song would remain the same regardless of the city referenced.

== Music video ==
The music video for "Please Don't Move to Melbourne" was directed by guitarist Dean Hanson and filmed in Brisbane. It features numerous references to local landmarks and venues and has been described as a tongue-in-cheek homage to the band's hometown.

== Reception ==
The song received strong airplay on Australian radio following its release and was widely discussed in Australian music media for its contrast between upbeat instrumentation and emotionally vulnerable lyrics.

=== Triple J Hottest 100 ===
"Please Don't Move to Melbourne" was voted into the Triple J Hottest 100, 2025, placing at number 10 in the countdown.

== Credits and personnel ==
Credits adapted from the liner notes of Like Love.

- Sam Cromack – vocals, acoustic guitar, 12-string acoustic guitar, synth, songwriting
- Jennifer Boyce – bass guitar, vocals
- Paul Furness – piano
- Dean Hanson – acoustic guitar, electric guitar, vocals, music video director
- Daniel Hanson – drums, vocals, tambourine
