= Weirder & Weirder =

2022 album by Ball Park Music

Studio album by Ball Park Music
- Released: 27 May 2022
- Recorded: 2021
- Genre: Indie rock
- Length: 46:02
- Label: Prawn
- Producer: Ball Park Music

Ball Park Music chronology
Ball Park Music (2020)	Weirder & Weirder (2022)	Like Love (2025)

Singles from Weirder & Weirder
- 1. "Sunscreen" Released: 25 October 2021; 2. "Stars in My Eyes" Released: 23 February 2022; 3. "Manny" Released: 5 May 2022

Weirder & Weirder is the seventh studio album by Australian indie rock band Ball Park Music, released on 27 May 2022 through Prawn Records. It was preceded by three singles, including "Sunscreen" and "Stars in My Eyes" – the latter polled at number eight in the Triple J Hottest 100 of 2022. The band also embarked on a headline Australian tour in support of the album from June 2022, their first in three years. Weirder & Weirder peaked at number two on the ARIA Albums Chart and was nominated for several awards, including Best Independent Album and Best Rock Album at the 2022 ARIA Awards, winning Album of the Year at the 2023 Queensland Music Awards.

== Background ==
In October 2020, Ball Park Music released their self-titled sixth studio album, which peaked at number two on the ARIA Albums Chart. At the 2021 ARIA Awards, it was nominated for Best Independent Release and Best Rock Album. The same month as the album's release, the band was featured on Triple J's Like a Version segment, covering Radiohead's "Paranoid Android".

== Release ==
The lead single "Sunscreen" was released alongside a music video on 28 October 2021. In the Triple J Hottest 100 of 2021, the track polled at number 21.

In February 2022, Ball Park Music announced their seventh album would be titled Weirder & Weirder and that it would release on 3 June. However, this release date was later rescheduled to 27 May. Upon the announcement of the album and its artwork, which was designed by artist Polly Bass Boost, frontman Samuel Cromack wrote via social media:

For more than a year we danced and dodged, fought and flirted with this music. Sometimes we had focused, frenzied periods of intense work; recordings popped up like daisies every which way you looked. Other times we thawed; the soft, slow heartbeat of the process swinging us far and wide with self-doubt.

The album's second single "Stars in My Eyes" followed on 23 February, described by Ellie Robinson of NME as bearing "retro pop influences" with a "lowkey slate of jangly, slightly fuzzy strums and frontman Sam Cromack’s wistful tenor". "Manny", the third and final single, was released on 5 May.

Upon the album's release, it was made Triple J's weekly feature album. Ball Park Music embarked on the nationwide Weirder & Weirder Tour on 3 June 2022, their first headlining show in three years, supported by King Stingray, Teenage Joans and Rat!Hammock.

== Reception ==
Professional ratings
Review scores
Source	Rating
The AU Review	4.5/5 stars
The Australian	4.5/5 stars

Reviewing for The AU Review, Dylan Marshall called the album "fantastic and contemplative" with a "renewed sense of adventure, joyousness, reflection and awareness", particularly praising the album's messages. Noel Mengel of Loud Mouth praised Weirder & Weirder as some of the band's best work, writing "the more you play [the album] the more it sounds like a greatest hits set".

Ellie Robinson from NME said "despite being made in notably dark times, Weirder & Weirder is distinctly upbeat, pillared by lavish soundscapes lacquered in fuzz and reverb, and carried along by shimmery, sun-kissed melodies that beckon copious replays."

Penultimate single "Stars in My Eyes" has been favoured by various publications to win Triple J's Hottest 100 of 2022, ultimately appearing in number eight in the countdown. The album also appeared at number two in Triple J's poll for the top ten albums of 2022, marking the band's seventh appearance on the list, with every prior studio album placing in past polls.

== Track listing ==
All tracks are written by Samuel Cromack, except for "Beautiful Blueberries" written by Dean Hanson.

Weirder & Weirder track listing
No.	Title	Length
1.	"Manny"	3:32
2.	"Pleb Rock"	4:04
3.	"Stars in My Eyes"	3:47
4.	"Right Now"	3:26
5.	"Caramel"	3:50
6.	"A Field to Break Your Back In"	3:24
7.	"Weirder & Weirder"	4:04
8.	"Sunscreen"	4:07
9.	"Writing Hand"	3:40
10.	"Beautiful Blueberries"	3:07
11.	"The Present Moment"	5:24
12.	"Three Little Words"	3:32
Total length:		46:02

== Personnel ==
Musicians

- Sam Cromack – lead vocals, electric guitar (all tracks); writing (tracks 1–9, 11–12), acoustic guitar (tracks 2, 5–7, 9, 12), percussion (tracks 1, 5–6, 8), organ (track 4)
- Jennifer Boyce – vocals (tracks 1–9, 11–12), bass guitar (tracks 1–3, 5–9, 11–12), Roland SH-101 (tracks 4–5)
- Daniel Hanson – drums (tracks 1–9, 11–12), tambourine (tracks 2–4, 6, 12), vocals (tracks 4, 6)
- Dean Hanson – electric guitar (tracks 1–9, 11–12), acoustic guitar (tracks 2, 10), Hofner bass guitar (track 3), writing (track 10), vocals (tracks 2–6, 8, 11–12)
- Paul Furness – Roland SH-101 (tracks 1–2, 6, 11–12), synthesiser (tracks 3–5, 7–8, 11), piano (track 2–5, 8–9, 12), Wurlitzer (tracks 6, 11), vocals (tracks 4, 6, 11–12), trombone (track 2), harpsichord (track 2), mellotron (tracks 4–5, 9, 12), organ (track 8)
- Sam Furness – trumpet (track 3)
- Emma Kelly – strings, arrangements (tracks 2, 5, 9–10)
- Violet Hanson – counting (track 3)
- Enid Cromack – counting (track 3)
- Joel Walker – claps (track 4)

Technical

- Sam Cromack – recording
- Paul McKercher – mixing
- William Bowden – mastering
- Polly Bass Boost – artwork

== Charts ==
Chart performance for Weirder & Weirder
Chart (2022)	Peak position
Australian Albums (ARIA)	2
