= Five Star Laundry =

Studio album by Motor Ace
- Released: 5 March 2001
- Genre: Alternative rock, post-grunge
- Length: 53:08
- Label: Sputnik
- Producer: Craig Harnath

Motor Ace chronology
Five Star Laundry (2001)	Shoot This (2002)

Singles from Five Star Laundry
- 1. "American Shoes" Released: 2000; 2. "Death Defy" Released: 2000; 3. "Hey Driver" Released: 2001

Five Star Laundry is the debut studio album by Australian post-grunge band, Motor Ace, which was released on 5 March 2001. It peaked at No. 4 on the ARIA Albums Chart. It exposed Motor Ace to the Australian public, especially by listeners of national youth radio station, Triple J.

== Singles ==
The album provided three singles, "American Shoes" (June 2000), "Death Defy" (November 2000) and "Hey Driver" (February 2001).

On the Triple J Hottest 100, 2000 both "American Shoes" (No. 65) and "Death Defy" (No. 98) were listed. "Hey Driver" appeared in the 2001 listing at No. 53.

== Track listing ==
1. "Hey Driver" – 4:56
2. "Death Defy" – 4:19
3. "Five Star Laundry" – 4:04
4. "Lorenzo" – 3:51
5. "Budge" – 4:47
6. "American Shoes" – 4:10
7. "Siamese" – 4:56
8. "Chairman of the Board" – 4:02
9. "Freefall" – 4:49
10. "Enemies" – 3:22
11. "Criminal Past" – 3:19
12. "Money and Sympathy" – 6:33

== Charts ==
Chart (2001)	Peak position
Australian Albums (ARIA)	4

== Certifications ==
Region	Certification	Certified units/sales
Australia (ARIA)	Gold	35,000^{^}
^{^} Shipments figures based on certification alone.

== Personnel ==
- Matt Balfe - bass, backing vocals
- Damian Costin - drums, percussion
- Dave Ong - guitars, piano
- Patrick (‘Patch’) Robertson - guitar, lead vocal
