= Say It to My Face (album) =

Studio album by Area-7
- Released: 15 October 2001
- Recorded: 2000–2001
- Genre: Ska punk, punk rock, pop punk
- Length: 38:11
- Label: Jive Records, Trademark Records
- Producer: Area-7

Area-7 chronology
Bitter & Twisted (2000)	Say It to My Face (2001)	Torn Apart (2005)

Alternative cover
- Original Cover

Say It to My Face is the third studio album by Australian ska band Area-7. It was released in 2001 by Jive Records and Trademark Records and peaked at number 36 on the ARIA Charts.

The album cover was changed just days before the release. The original artwork had an army and war theme, and just before the release of the album the 11 September attacks occurred, so it was changed out of respect for the victims of these attacks.

The song "Individuality" was featured in the Rocket Power television movie Race Across New Zealand on Nickelodeon in 2002.

== Track listing ==
1. "Leave Me Alone"
2. "Mind Games"
3. "Cant Be Happy"
4. "Now I Know"
5. "Individuality"
6. "History Is Written"
7. "Liar"
8. "Nobody Likes A Bogan"
9. "Save Yourself"
10. "Consequences"
11. "JJ"
12. "Kicks"

== Charts ==
Chart (2001)	Peak position
Australian Albums (ARIA)	36
