= Like Love =

2025 album by Ball Park Music

Studio album by Ball Park Music
- Released: 4 April 2025
- Recorded: Golden Retriever (Marrickville, New South Wales, Australia)
- Length: 39:46
- Label: Prawn
- Producer: Matthew Redlich

Ball Park Music chronology
Weirder & Weirder (2022)	Like Love (2025)

Singles from Like Love
- 1. "Like Love" Released: 23 October 2024; 2. "Please Don't Move to Melbourne" Released: 7 February 2025; 3. "Coast Is Clear" Released: 4 April 2025

Like Love is the eighth studio album by Australian indie rock band Ball Park Music, released on 4 April 2025 through Prawn Records. The album debuted at number 1 on the ARIA Charts, becoming the band's first chart topper.

The album will be supported by a 30-date tour of Australia and New Zealand.

At the 2025 ARIA Music Awards, the album was nominated for Best Independent Release and Best Rock Album. Their single "Please Don't Move to Melbourne" received heavy rotation on Triple J and placed #10 in the Triple J Hottest 100, 2025, their 10th inclusion in the annual countdown.

At the 2026 Queensland Music Awards, the album won Album of the Year and Highest Selling Album of the Year.

At the APRA Music Awards of 2026, its title track was shortlisted for Song of the Year.

== Reception ==
Professional ratings
Review scores
Source	Rating
The AU Review	4/5 stars

Dylan Marshall from The AU Review said "Like Love [has] an overwhelming sense of familiarity and connection" and called it "maturing of the band".

== Track listing ==
All tracks are written by Samuel Cromack.

Like Love track listing
No.	Title	Length
1.	"Coast Is Clear"	4:04
2.	"Overwhelming Sound"	3:58
3.	"Please Don't Move to Melbourne"	4:51
4.	"As Far as I Can Tell"	4:23
5.	"Like Love"	2:54
6.	"NORK"	4:00
7.	"Bells in Bloom"	4:05
8.	"Pain & Love"	3:21
9.	"Gabrielle"	2:56
10.	"Fast Forward"	5:11
Total length:		39:46

== Personnel ==
Musicians

- Jennifer Boyce – bass guitar (1, 3–4, 6–8, 10), vocals (1–4, 6–8, 10)
- Sam Cromack – vocals (all tracks), acoustic guitar (1, 3, 5–9), electric guitar (1, 7–8), synth (1, 3, 8, 10), nylon string guitar (2), twelve-string guitar (3), baritone guitar (4, 10)
- Daniel Hanson – drums (1, 3–4, 6–8, 10), vocals (1–3, 8, 10), tambourine (3–4), percussion (8)
- Dean Hanson – acoustic guitar (1, 3, 6–7), electric guitar (1–4, 10), vocals (1–4, 6–8, 10), twelve-string acoustic guitar (8)
- Paul Furness – piano (1, 3, 5–8, 10), Hammond organ (4), Wurlitzer (6, 8), Rhodes piano (7, 10), cymbal (8), vocals (10)

Technical

- Matthew Redlich – producer
- Yianni Adams – assistant producer, assistant engineer

== Charts ==
=== Weekly charts ===
Chart performance for Like Love
Chart (2025)	Peak position
Australian Albums (ARIA)	1

=== Year-end charts ===
Year-end chart performance for Like Love
Chart (2025)	Position
Australian Artist Albums (ARIA)	18
