= Happiness and Surrounding Suburbs =

Studio album by Ball Park Music
- Released: 9 September 2011
- Recorded: January 2011–June 2011
- Studio: Massive Studios (Brisbane, Queensland); King Willy Sound (Launceston, Tasmania)
- Length: 43:10
- Label: Stop Start; EMI Australia
- Producer: Matt Redlich

Ball Park Music chronology
Conquer the Town, Easy As Cake (2010)	Happiness and Surrounding Suburbs (2011)	Museum (2012)

Singles from Happiness and Surrounding Suburbs
- 1. "Sad Rude Future Dude" Released: 13 October 2010; 2. "Rich People Are Stupid" Released: 9 June 2011; 3. "It's Nice to Be Alive" Released: 15 July 2011; 4. "All I Want Is You" Released: October 2011; 5. "Literally Baby" Released: November 2011

Happiness and Surrounding Suburbs is the debut studio album by Australian indie pop band Ball Park Music, released in Australia and New Zealand on 9 September 2011 through Stop Start and EMI Music Australia. It debuted at number 36 on the ARIA albums chart, and peaked at number 26 following the release of their self-titled sixth studio album in 2020. Produced by Matt Redlich, the album includes "iFly" from their 2010 EP Conquer the Town, Easy As Cake, and was preceded by the singles "Sad Rude Future Dude", "Rich People Are Stupid", "It's Nice to Be Alive" and "All I Want Is You". At the 2011 J Awards, Happiness and Surrounding Suburbs was nominated for Australian Album of the Year.

== Recording and production ==
Happiness and Surrounding Suburbs contains material that had been written by the band's frontman Sam Cromack from the mid-2000s through to the album's release in 2011. A number of demos were recorded for the record with the track list resulting in 11 tracks. A further song – "Big Big Mess" – from a previous session was released during this period as a b-side for the physical version of "It's Nice to Be Alive".

The album was recorded in Brisbane with producer/engineer Matt Redlich between January and June 2011 in his home studio called Massive Studios. The band later said, "It was recorded in his parents basement in East Brisbane. He had a beautiful tape machine that made us sound a hundred bucks. We used to save our money until we had enough to go back to the studio and do another song. This meant the album was recorded in dribs and drabs over the course of about a year."

== Critical response ==
The AU Review voted it at #2 for 2011.

Jody Macgregor at Rave Magazine gave it four-and-a-half stars and Album of the Week.

Triple J Magazine awarded it 8/10.

== Track listing ==
All music and lyrics written by Sam Cromack:

1. "Literally Baby" – 2:47
2. "It's Nice to Be Alive" – 3:29
3. "Sad Rude Future Dude" – 2:17
4. "All I Want Is You" – 3:29
5. "Rich People Are Stupid" – 2:15
6. "Alligator" – 4:36
7. "Birds Down Basements" – 3:48
8. "Shithaus" – 3:26
9. "iFly" – 2:33
10. "Glass Jar" – 2:46
11. "Happy Healthy Citizen of the Developed World Blues" – 5:37

== Personnel ==
Ball Park Music

- Sam Cromack – writing, vocals, guitar (1–11)
- Jennifer Boyce – vocals, bass guitar (1–11)
- Daniel Hanson – drums (1–11)
- Dean Hanson – guitar, vocals (1–11)
- Paul Furness – piano, synthesiser (1–11)
- Brock Smith - guitar (1–11)

Technical

- Matt Redlich – production, engineering, mixing (1–11)
- William Bowden – mastering (1–11)

Artwork

- Polly Bass Boost – artwork

== Charts ==
Chart (2011)	Peak position
Australian Albums (ARIA)	36
Chart (2020)	Peak position
Australian Albums (ARIA)	26

== Release history ==
Region	Date	Format	Edition(s)	Label	Catalogue
Australia	9 September 2011	CD; digital download	Standard	Stop Start / EMI	SSM13
Australia	Oct 2020	LP	re-release	Stop Start / EMI	SSM13
