= Good Mood (album) =

2018 studio album by Ball Park Music

Studio album by Ball Park Music
- Released: 16 February 2018
- Recorded: May–July 2017
- Studios: Bunnings Warehouse Recording Studio, Stafford, Queensland
- Genre: Indie pop
- Length: 41:15
- Label: Prawn Records
- Producer: Ball Park Music

Ball Park Music chronology
Every Night the Same Dream (2016)	Good Mood (2018)	Ball Park Music (2020)

Singles from Good Mood
- 1. "Exactly How You Are" Released: 15 September 2017; 2. "The Perfect Life Does Not Exist" Released: 15 December 2017; 3. "Hands Off My Body" Released: June 2018

Good Mood is the fifth studio album by Australian indie pop band Ball Park Music. It was released on 16 February 2018, debuting at number five on the ARIA Albums chart. The album was promoted with two national tours from February 2018 and May 2019 respectively, as well as three singles including the certified platinum "Exactly How You Are". At the 2018 ARIA Music Awards, the album was nominated for three awards: Producer of the Year, Engineer of the Year and Best Cover Art.

== Recording and production ==
The album was recorded between May and July 2017 at the band's studio (named the Bunnings Warehouse Recording Studio), within an industrial estate in Stafford in Brisbane. It was produced by the band and engineered by Cromack, mixed by Paul McKercher and mastered by William Bowden.

On the song-writing, Cromack said, "I put some rules on myself: everything had to have the classic verse-chorus-verse-chorus pop structure. I had a ball. And with my lyrics I was like, 'For God's sake, Sam, be clear about what you want to say!' So often we look down on pop music, but the rules didn't crush our creativity."

== Cover ==
The photo on the cover was taken by band guitarist Dean Hanson. It depicts horse rider Mindy Davies atop her steed, Teddy. Hanson said Cromack was fascinated with images of "horses rearing in cool places", and the band thought it would be a powerful album cover to "get someone to rear their horse in front of the garage door of [their] studio." The image went on to be nominated for Best Cover Art at the 2018 ARIA Music Awards.

== Critical response ==
The Sydney Morning Herald said, "Opening with the poppy, yet summery laid-back feel of 'The End Times', this self-produced album brings studio whiz and ARIA award-winner Paul McKercher into the mix, elevating frontman/guitarist Sam Cromack's vocals to a new level and highlighting his lyrical strength." The Herald Sun claimed, "The experimentation and attention to sonic detail here (it's a headphones album) makes this their Pet Sounds", and compared "The End Times" to, "a ragged Go-Betweens-style indie gem".

The Australian noted, "the affable plain-spokenness, the facility for melodies that can cure a vitamin D deficiency and, yes, the festival-friendly anthems with unabashedly broad appeal" and declared it their best album.

== Track listing ==
All tracks are written by Sam Cromack, unless noted.

No.	Title	Writer(s)	Length
1.	"The End Times"		4:07
2.	"I Am a Dog"		3:36
3.	"Frank"		3:48
4.	"The Perfect Life Does Not Exist"	Sam Cromack; Dean Hanson	3:21
5.	"Exactly How You Are"		3:36
6.	"Hands Off My Body"		2:57
7.	"So Nice"		5:08
8.	"Dreaming of America"		4:44
9.	"If It Kills You"	Cromack; Hanson	4:42
10.	"I Am So In Love With You"	Cromack; Hanson	5:13
Total length:			41:15

== Personnel ==
Adapted from liner notes.

- Ball Park Music – producer, writing, arrangements; specifically:
  - Sam Cromack – engineer, writing (all tracks)
  - Dean Hanson – art direction, cover photo, writing (tracks 4, 9–10)
- Paul McKercher – mixing
- William Bowden – mastering
- Polly Bass Boost – art direction
- Mindy Davies – horse rider
- Teddy – horse

== Charts ==
Chart (2018)	Peak position
Australian Albums (ARIA)	5
