= Theory of Everything (album) =

Studio album by Children Collide
- Released: (Australia) 27 August 2010
- Recorded: Sound Factory, Hollywood, CA, United States; Sonora Recorders, Atwater Village, CA, USA; Studio One, Collingwood, Vic, Australia
- Genre: Rock, indie rock, grunge
- Length: 42:46
- Label: Universal
- Producer: Rob Schnapf, Paul "Woody" Annison

Children Collide chronology
The Long Now (2008)	Theory of Everything (2010)	Monument (2012)

Singles from Theory of Everything
- 1. "Jellylegs" Released: 18 June 2010; 2. "My Eagle" Released: 27 August 2010; 3. "Arrows" Released: 18 February 2011; 4. "Loveless" Released: 2011

Theory of Everything is the second studio album by Australian indie rock band Children Collide. The album was recorded in Los Angeles and Melbourne, Australia. It was produced by Rob Schnapf in the United States and Woody Annison in Melbourne. The album was released by Universal in Australia on 27 August 2010. The first single, "Jellylegs", was released on 18 June 2010, and reached number 72 on the Australian ARIA Charts.

Several different special editions of the album were made available for pre-orders via the Children Collide website and other online stores. These included limited edition Tarot cards and limited edition singles.

== Track listing ==
No.	Title	Length
1.	"Future Monks"	3:17
2.	"Jellylegs"	3:39
3.	"Asleep on My Feet"	3:47
4.	"My Eagle"	2:50
5.	"Arrows"	3:32
6.	"Fashion Fits"	4:07
7.	"Loveless"	5:04
8.	"Complacency No Vacancy"	3:30
9.	"Speed of Sound"	2:58
10.	"Inventions"	2:58
11.	"Into the Sky with Ivy"	3:05
12.	"Seven Forks"	3:58

== Charts ==
Chart (2010)	Peak position
Australian Albums (ARIA)	5

== Personnel ==
- Johnny Mackay – vocals, guitar
- Heath Crawley – bass
- Ryan Caesar – drums

=== Additional personnel ===
- Rob Schnapf – production (tracks 2, 4, 5, 8 & 10), mixing
- Doug Boem – recording (tracks 2, 4, 5, 8 & 10), mixing
- Paul "Woody" Annison – production (tracks 1, 3, 6, 7, 9, 11, 12)
- Luke Postill – recording (tracks 1, 3, 6, 7, 9, 11, 12)
- Jason Mott – assistant engineer at the Sound Factory
- Chris Szczech – assistant engineer at the Sonora
- Leon Zervos – mastering
- Emily Hunt – artwork
