= It's Nice to Be Alive =

2011 song by Ball Park Music

- CD single cover art

Single by Ball Park Music

from the album Happiness and Surrounding Suburbs
- Released: 15 July 2011
- Length: 3:31
- Label: Stop Start/Inertia
- Songwriter(s): Sam Cromack
- Producer(s): Matt Redlich

Ball Park Music singles chronology
"Rich People Are Stupid" (2011)	"It's Nice to Be Alive" (2011)	"All I Want Is You" (2011)

Music video
- "It's Nice to Be Alive" on YouTube

"It's Nice to Be Alive" is a song by Australian indie rock band Ball Park Music, released in July 2011 as the third single from their debut studio album Happiness and Surrounding Suburbs. The song polled at number 31 in the Triple J Hottest 100, 2011. The song was certified platinum in Australia in 2021. In 2025, the song placed 49 in the Triple J Hottest 100 of Australian Songs.

In 2023, it was released on vinyl as a special RSD limited edition 12".

== Track listings ==
CD / LP single

1. "It's Nice to Be Alive" - 3:31
2. "Big Big Mess" - 4:50

== Certifications ==
Region	Certification	Certified units/sales
Australia (ARIA)	Platinum	70,000^{‡}
^{‡} Sales+streaming figures based on certification alone.
