= Exactly How You Are =

2017 song by Ball Park Music

Single by Ball Park Music

from the album Good Mood
- Released: 15 September 2017
- Length: 3:36
- Label: Prawn
- Songwriter: Sam Cromack
- Producer: Sam Cromack

Ball Park Music singles chronology
"Whipping Boy" (2016)	"Exactly How You Are" (2017)	"The Perfect Life Does Not Exist" (2017)

Music video
- "Exactly How You Are" on YouTube

"Exactly How You Are" is a song by Australian indie rock band Ball Park Music, released on 15 September 2017 as the lead single from the band's fifth studio album Good Mood (2018). In November 2017, the group performed the song in the triple j studios for Like a Version.

The song polled at number 18 in the Triple J Hottest 100, 2017. The song was certified platinum in Australia in 2021.

At the APRA Music Awards of 2019 the song was shortlisted for Song of the Year.

== Reception ==
Al Newstead from Triple J said "'Exactly How You Are' is free of the more melancholy shades that coloured the Brisbane group’'s last album. Instead, it embraces warm melodies and a feel-good, catchy chorus of 'I love you exactly how you are'."

Hayden Davies from Pilerats said of the song "it's a sun-soaked, summery anthem which will no doubt soundtrack our lives as we head into the warmer months".

== Certifications ==
Region	Certification	Certified units/sales
Australia (ARIA)	Platinum	70,000^{‡}
^{‡} Sales+streaming figures based on certification alone.
