= Bitter & Twisted (album) =

Studio album by Area-7
- Released: March 20, 2000
- Recorded: 1999–2000
- Genre: Ska punk
- Length: 41:13
- Label: Zomba, Trademark Records
- Producer: Area-7

Area-7 chronology
Road Rage (1997)	Bitter & Twisted (2000)	Say It to My Face (2001)

Singles from Album
- 1. "Bitter Words" Released: 1998; 2. "Second Class Citizen" Released: 1999; 3. "Start Making Sense" Released: 2000; 4. "Bitter Words / Himbo" Released: 2000

Bitter & Twisted is the second studio album by Australian ska band Area-7. It was released in 2000 by Trademark Records.

== Track listing ==
1. "Bitter Words"
2. "Start Making Sense"
3. "Himbo"
4. "Blind"
5. "Walk Away"
6. "Boys Don't Cry"
7. "Skin Deep"
8. "Dodgy Mate"
9. "Let Me Down"
10. "Unsung Hero"
11. "Second Class Citizen"
12. "Big Ben"

== Charts ==
Chart (2000)	Peak position
Australian Albums (ARIA Charts)	6

== Note ==
- Track 6 is a cover of the song Boys Don't Cry by The Cure.
