= Puddinghead =

Studio album by Ball Park Music
- Released: 4 April 2014
- Recorded: March 2013–May 2013; June 2013–January 2014
- Genre: Indie rock
- Length: 41:00
- Labels: Stop Start, Inertia Music
- Producer: Ball Park Music

Ball Park Music chronology
Museum (2012)	Puddinghead (2014)	Every Night the Same Dream (2016)

Singles from Puddinghead
- 1. "She Only Loves Me When I'm There" Released: 14 February 2014; 2. "Trippin' the Light Fantastic" Released: 23 May 2014

Puddinghead is the third studio album by Australian indie pop band Ball Park Music, released on 4 April 2014 by Stop Start and Inertia Music. It was supported by two singles, "She Only Loves Me When I'm There" and "Trippin' the Light Fantastic", as well as two national tours and one European tour in 2014. The album was nominated for Best Rock Album at the 2014 ARIA Music Awards, and Australian Album of the Year at the 2014 J Awards. It peaked at number two on the ARIA Albums Chart.

== Recording ==
The album was self-produced in a share house in the Northern Suburbs of Brisbane. Reflecting on the recording process of their previous two albums, frontman Sam Cromack said that "they were done in a real whirlwind," but with Puddinghead the band "could properly sit down and spend some more time just focusing on making a record."

== Release and reception ==
The album had two songs feature in the Triple J's Hottest 100 of 2014, with the lead single highest-placed at number 19. Puddinghead also placed at number two on the 2014 Triple J Album Poll.

The title of the album is a reference to a Shakespearean insult. Cromack wrote the album's title track "Puddinghead", however it did not make the album – it was instead released as a B-side of "Trippin' the Light Fantastic" when it was digitally released as a single on 23 May 2014.

Professional ratings
Review scores
Source	Rating
Kill Your Stereo	5/5 stars

Music publication Kill Your Stereo gave the album a five-star writing, praising Puddinghead as a "fantastic release" that is "the strongest thing that they've released throughout their entire career so far." Scenewave Australia wrote the record features "powerful riffs, gorgeous harmonies and soaring vocals, intricately woven into delicious melodies," also calling it "their most accomplished release to date."

== Track listing ==
All lyrics are written by Sam Cromack; track 1 co-written by Dean Hanson.

No.	Title	Length
1.	"She Only Loves Me When I'm There"	3:45
2.	"Next Life Already"	2:14
3.	"A Good Life Is the Best Revenge"	3:40
4.	"Teenager Pie"	3:59
5.	"Trippin' the Light Fantastic"	3:06
6.	"Cocaine Lion"	3:14
7.	"Everything Is Shit Except My Friendship with You"	3:16
8.	"Struggle Street"	4:57
9.	"Error Playin'"	4:06
10.	"Polly Screw My Head Back On"	4:42
11.	"Girls from High School"	3:48
Total length:		40:08

== Personnel ==
Musicians

- Ball Park Music – producer, engineer;
  - Paul Furness – synth (1, 5), Rhodes piano (1–4, 7, 10), 8-bit keys (1), piano (2–5, 7, 9, 11), Nord flutes (2, 8, 10), Roland SH-101 (3, 9, 11), organ (4–8, 11), harpsichord (5, 7, 10), trombone (7)
  - Jennifer Boyce – bass guitar (1, 3–11), vocals (all tracks)
  - Sam Cromack – vocals (all tracks), writing (all tracks), guitar (all tracks), vocoder (1), bass guitar (2), synth (5, 7), acoustic guitar (7, 11), beatbox (7)
  - Dean Hanson – guitar (all tracks), writing (1), trombone (5), vocals (5), hi-hat (7), acoustic guitar (10), ambient noise (11)
  - Daniel Hanson – drums (all tracks), cowbell (1), tambourine (1–2, 6), electronic drums (3, 5), percussion (5, 7), synth (5), vocals (5)
- Chris Darbyshire – tenor sax (5), alto sax (5)

Additional personnel

- Tony Hoffer – mixing
- Dave Cooley – mastering
- Polly Bass Boost – artwork

== Charts ==
Chart (2014)	Peak position
Australian Albums (ARIA)	2

== Release history ==
Region	Date	Format	Edition(s)	Label	Catalogue
Australia	4 April 2014	CD; digital download	Standard	Stop Start / EMI	SSM77CD
Australia	October 2014	LP	Platinum	Stop Start / EMI	SSM77LP
