= Patrick Robertson (musician) =

Australian musician and songwriter

Patrick Thomas Robertson is an Australian musician and songwriter, who was frontman for the post-grunge rock band Motor Ace. Formed in Melbourne during 1998, Motor Ace had top five chart success on the Australian Recording Industry Association (ARIA) Albums Chart with Five Star Laundry (No. 4, 2001) and Shoot This (No. 1, 2002). Their highest-charting single, "Carry On", written by Robertson, peaked at No. 13 on the ARIA Singles Chart.

== Biography ==
Patrick "Patch" Thomas Robertson is an Australian musician and songwriter from Melbourne. As a vocalist and guitarist, he formed Snowblind in 1993 with Bianca Lew on Drums, Angus Husband on guitar, Beth Mellick on keyboards, and Rowena Robertson on bass guitar. The band released a four-track EP, Lorenzo in October 1996 by First Floor Records.

In 1998, Robertson became the frontman for the post-grunge rock band Motor Ace which formed in Melbourne. They had top five chart success on the Australian Recording Industry Association (ARIA) Albums Chart with Five Star Laundry (No. 4, 2001) and Shoot This (No. 1, 2002). Their highest-charting single, "Carry On", written by Robertson, peaked at No. 13 on the ARIA Singles Chart. Both albums were nominated for 'Best Rock Album' at consecutive ARIA awards.

A lengthy hiatus from 2003 allowed individual members to pace themselves with their own projects. Robertson began experimenting with his own musical abilities that would eventually form the basis of Motor Ace's album of 2005, Animal. Though critically very well received, the album's benign, melancholy sound did not sit well with casual fans and radio programmers. The album was a commercial failure, and it has been speculated that this led to Motor Ace's permanent breakup in December 2005.

Since Motor Ace disbanded, Robertson has worked professionally on soundtracks and scores, as well as attending the prestigious AFTRS (Australian Film Television and Radio School) where he completed the Screen Composition degree. He wrote and performed the music for the Australian short film Love This Time, which won a Special Mention at the 2006 Berlinale Film Festival. He composed the soundtrack for the documentary short Veiled Ambition by Melbourne filmmaker Celeste Geer, which received the Palace Films Award for a short film promoting Human Rights at the 2006 Melbourne International Film Festival. He has recently completed the music for several projects for ABC TV's 'Anatomy' series, including films 'Eye', 'Mind' and 'Muscle'.
