= Push the Blues Away =

Studio album by Josh Teskey and Ash Grunwald
- Released: 13 November 2020
- Studio: Half Mile Harvest Studios (Warrandyte, Victoria); Crystal Mastering (Thornbury, Victoria)
- Length: 29:34
- Label: Ivy League
- Producer: Sam Teskey

Ash Grunwald albums chronology
Anthology 2002–2020 (2020)	Push the Blues Away (2020)

Singles from Push the Blues Away
- 1. "Thinking 'Bout Myself" Released: 24 August 2020; 2. "Hungry Heart" Released: 2 October 2020

Push the Blues Away is a collaborative studio album by Australian blues musicians Josh Teskey and Ash Grunwald, released on 13 November 2020 through Ivy League Records.

The album was recorded to analogue tape and features a mix of original songs by both artists, alongside two covers.

== Background and release ==
The album was inspired by both artists' love of blues and mutual admiration for each other's work. The project commenced after the duo began an impromptu jam of "The Sky Is Crying" during downtime between takes filming a video clip for Grunwald's "Ain't My Problem", a track which featured the Teskey Brothers. Grunwald said "Somebody filmed our little jam, and it became the seed of a great idea: Why don't we do an acoustic blues album? No bells and whistles, something from the heart. This album was made how any good blues album should be in my opinion; Spontaneously and instinctively."

The album was recorded in five days at The Teskey Brothers' studio in Warrandyte.

The eight-track album features a handful of songs written by Teskey and Grunwald respectively, along with two covers – Son House's "Preachin' Blues" and the aforementioned "The Sky Is Crying".

== Singles ==
On 23 August 2020, Teskey and Grunwald premiered the song "Thinking 'Bout Myself" on ABC's The Sound. The song was digitally released the following day.

The album's second single "Hungry Heart" was written by Josh Teskey and released on 2 October 2020. Teskey said of the track "After spending many years running away, attempting to push the blues away, 'Hungry Heart' is the happy ending, the moment when I stopped running away and found and accepted love. The song is basically the story of spending your whole life searching for love and finding it. The hungry heart is fed! I dedicate this song to my incredible life partner Hannah and our daughter Ayva."

== Critical reception ==
Professional ratings
Review scores
Source	Rating
Newcastle Star	3/5 stars

Josh Leeson from Newcastle Star said "Subtly is the key to the album. With just acoustic guitar and harmonica, Teskey's raw vocal is left to deliver the colour and feeling. Grunwald, too, produces some of his finest work in years. "

== Awards and nominations ==
=== AIR Awards ===
Year	Nominee / work	Award	Result	Ref.
2021	Push the Blues Away (with Josh Teskey)	Best Independent Blues and Roots Album or EP	Nominated	

=== ARIA Music Awards ===
Year	Nominee / work	Award	Result	Ref.
2021	Push the Blues Away (with Ash Grunwald)	Best Blues and Roots Album	Nominated	

== Track listing ==
Push the Blues Away track listing
No.	Title	Writer(s)	Length
1.	"Low Down Dog"		3:38
2.	"Hungry Heart"	Josh Teskey	3:21
3.	"Thinking 'Bout Myself"	Ash Grunwald	3:41
4.	"Push the Blues Away"		3:29
5.	"It Rained"		4:54
6.	"Something with Feel"		3:07
7.	"Preachin' the Blues"	Son House	3:21
8.	"The Sky Is Crying"	Elmore James; Morgan Robinson; Clarence Lewis	4:03
Total length:			29:34

== Personnel ==
Adapted from the album's liner notes.

=== Musicians ===
- Josh Teskey – writing (1–6), vocals (1–8)
- Ash Grunwald – writing (1–6), vocals (1–8)

Other musicians

- Son House – writing (7)
- Elmore James – writing (8)
- Morgan Robinson – writing (8)
- Clarence Lewis – writing (8)

=== Technical ===
- Sam Teskey – recording, mixing (1–8)
- Joe Carra – mastering (1–8)

=== Artwork ===
- Tom Dunphy – photography
- Sebastian White – design and illustration

== Charts ==
Chart performance for Push the Blues Away
Chart (2020)	Peak position
Australian Albums (ARIA)	8
