= Josh Teskey =

Australian blues musician

- Teskey in 2023

Background information
- Born: Josh Teskey; 31 July 1987 (age 39)
- Origin: Warrandyte, Victoria, Australia
- Occupations: Singer; songwriter; guitarist; musician; author
- Instruments: Vocals; guitar
- Years active: 2008–present
- Label: Ivy League

Josh Teskey (born 31 July 1987) is an Australian blues musician, best known for his work with the Teskey Brothers. Teskey released the collaborative studio album, Push the Blues Away with Ash Grunwald, on 13 November 2020, which peaked at number 8 on the ARIA Albums Chart.

== Life and career ==
=== 1987–2007: Early life ===
Josh Teskey was born on 31 July 1987 in Warrandyte, Victoria. He attended a local primary school with no year levels. He was close to his brother Sam, with Josh saying in 2021, "We had these bird calls we'd do so we could always find each other in bush near where we lived. We also used them at parties when we were teenagers. I'd do the call and Sam would materialise out of the crowd." The two started playing music together after moving to a Steiner high school when Josh was 15 and Sam 13. Josh said "I jumped straight into singing and then played guitar, but Sam focused on the guitar".

=== 2008–present: The Teskey Brothers ===
In 2008, Josh and Sam formed the blues rock band, the Teskey Brothers alongside Brendon Love and Liam Gough. The band became a fixture at the St Andrews Market, performing at regular spots in Warrandyte and bars in Melbourne, as well as other private shows. The band released their debut studio album, Half Mile Harvest in 2017 which peaked at number 18 on the ARIA Charts. The band's second studio album, Run Home Slow was released in 2019 and peaked at number 2 on the ARIA Charts and won three ARIA Music Awards at the 2019 awards.

=== 2019–present: Solo career & Push the Blues Away ===
On 18 October 2019, Teskey featured on the Soul Messin' Allstars song "Soul a Go Go".

On 23 August 2020, Teskey and Ash Grunwald premiered the song "Thinking 'Bout Myself" on ABC's The Sound. The song is the lead single from their collaborative studio album, Push the Blues Away, released on 13 November 2020. Push the Blues Away debuted and peaked at number 8 on the ARIA Charts.

== Discography ==
=== Collaborative albums ===
List of collaborative albums, with release date, label and selected chart position shown
Title	Album details	Peak chart positions
Title	Album details	AUS
Push the Blues Away (with Ash Grunwald)	Released: 13 November 2020; Label: Ivy League Records (IVY582); Format: CD, LP, digital download, streaming	8

=== Singles ===
List of singles, with year released and album name shown
Title	Year	Album
"Soul a Go Go" (As Soul Messin' Allstars featuring Josh Teskey)	2019	The Craig Charles Trunk of Funk, Vol. 1
"Do You Love Me" (Jimmy Barnes and Josh Teskey)	2022	Soul Deep 30
"Hurts So Bad" (WILSN and Josh Teskey)	2022	Those Days Are Over
"Do I Need to Know What Love Is?" (with Alice Ivy)	2024	Do What Makes You Happy

=== Guest appearances ===
List of guest appearances, with year released and album name shown
Title	Year	Album
"Waiting Around to Die" (Ash Grunwald featuring Joe Bonamassa, Ian Collard and Josh Teskey)	2019	Mojo

== Awards and nominations ==
=== AIR Awards ===
The Australian Independent Record Awards (commonly known informally as AIR Awards) is an annual awards night to recognise, promote and celebrate the success of Australia's independent music sector.

Year	Nominee / work	Award	Result	Ref.
2021	Push the Blues Away (with Ash Grunwald)	Best Independent Blues and Roots Album or EP	Nominated	
2025	"Do I Need To Know What Love Is?" (with Alice Ivy)	Independent Song of the Year	Nominated	
2025	"Do I Need To Know What Love Is?" (with Alice Ivy)	Best Independent Dance, Electronica or Club Single	Won	

=== APRA Awards ===
The APRA Awards are held in Australia and New Zealand by the Australasian Performing Right Association to recognise songwriting skills, sales and airplay performance by its members annually. Josh Teskey has been nominated for three awards.

Year	Nominee / work	Award	Result	Ref.
2019	"Forever You and Me" ( with Liam Gough, Brendon Love and Sam Teskey)	Song of the Year	Shortlisted	
2020	"I Get Up" (with Liam Gough, Brendon Love and Sam Teskey)	Song of the Year	Nominated	
2020	"I Get Up" (with Liam Gough, Brendon Love and Sam Teskey)	Most Performed Blues & Roots Work of the Year	Nominated	
2020	The Teskey Brothers (with Liam Gough, Brendon Love and Sam Teskey)	Breakthrough Songwriter of the Year	Nominated	
2021	"Rain" (with Liam Gough, Brendon Love and Sam Teskey)	Most Performed R&B / Soul Work	Won	
2022	"Hungry Heart" (Josh Teskey & Ash Grunwald)	Most Performed Blues and Roots Work	Nominated	
2024	"Take My Heart" (Josh and Sam Teskey)	Song of the Year	Shortlisted	
2024	"Oceans of Emotions" (Josh and Sam Teskey)	Most Performed R&B / Soul Work	Nominated	
2024	The Teskey Brothers (Josh and Sam Teskey)	Songwriter of the Year	Won	

=== ARIA Music Awards ===
The ARIA Music Awards is an annual ceremony presented by Australian Recording Industry Association (ARIA), which recognise excellence, innovation, and achievement across all genres of the music of Australia. They commenced in 1987.

Year	Nominee / work	Award	Result	Ref.
2021	Push the Blues Away (with Ash Grunwald )	Best Blues and Roots Album	Nominated	

=== Music Victoria Awards ===
The Music Victoria Awards, are an annual awards night celebrating Victorian music. They commenced in 2005.

Year	Nominee / work	Award	Result	Ref.
2021	Josh Teskey and Ash Grunwald	Best Blues Act	Nominated	
