= AIR Awards of 2021 =

Edition of annual Australian music award

2021 AIR Awards
- Date: 5 August 2021
- Venue: Freemasons Hall, Adelaide, Australia
- Hosted by: Dylan Lewis; Jessica Braithwaite

Highlights
- Most wins: DMA's (3)
- Most nominations: Spacey Jane (4)
- Website: https://air.org.au/air-awards/

Television/radio coverage
- Network: YouTube

The 2021 AIR Awards is the fifteenth annual Australian Independent Record Labels Association Music Awards ceremony (generally known as the AIR Awards). It took place virtually on 5 August 2021 in Adelaide.

The nominations were revealed on 2 June 2021 with all material being released in 2020.

At the virtual event, AIR CEO, Maria Amato said "Congratulations to all the nominees and winners tonight. In a year of continued lockdowns and enormous challenges it was great to see Australian independent artists continue to create new music and connect with engaged audiences."

Minister for Innovation and Skills David Pisoni said "Congratulations to all the nominees and winners. You all richly deserve the recognition after what has been a challenging year for the music industry. The South Australian Government is proud to support these awards, showcasing the amazing artists that we have in this country across a wide range of diverse genres of music."

== Performances ==
- Emma Donovan & The Putbacks "Yarian Mitji"
- DMA's with "Silver"
- Wolf & Cub "Blue State"

== Nominees and winners ==
=== AIR Awards ===
Winners are listed first and highlighted in boldface; other final nominees are listed alphabetically.

Independent Album of the Year	Independent Song of the Year
**DMA's – The Glow**; Ball Park Music – Ball Park Music; Emma Donovan and the Putbacks – Crossover; Fanny Lumsden – Fallow; Spacey Jane – Sunlight	**Spacey Jane – "Booster Seat"**; Gordi – "Extraordinary Life"; King Stingray – "Hey Wanhaka"; Merci, Mercy – "Fucked Myself Up"; The Jungle Giants – "Sending Me Ur Loving"
Breakthrough Independent Artist of the Year	Best Independent Blues and Roots Album or EP
**Spacey Jane**; Haiku Hands; Hayley Mary; Mia Wray; Sycco	**Vika and Linda - Sunday (The Gospel According to Iso)**; #1 Dads - Golden Repair; Emma Swift – Blonde on the Tracks; Josh Teskey and Ash Grunwald – Push the Blues Away; The Teskey Brothers – Live at the Forum
Best Independent Children's Album or EP	Best Independent Classical Album or EP
**Teeny Tiny Stevies - Thoughtful Songs for Little People**; Amber Lawrence - Kids Gone Country - Fun for All the Family; Diver City - Welcome to Diver City; Spotty Kites - Have a Spotty Christmas; The Wiggles - Choo Choo Trains, Propeller Planes & Toot Toot Chugga Chugga Big Red Car!	**Joseph Tawadros, James Tawadros, Sydney Symphony Orchestra and Benjamin Northey - Live at the Sydney Opera House**; Andrew Blanch and Ariel Nurhadi - Alchemy; Australian Chamber Orchestra and Richard Tognetti - Brahms: Symphonies 3 & 4; Ensemble Offspring - Songbirds; Jayson Gillham, Adelaide Symphony Orchestra and Nicholas Carter - Beethoven: The Piano Concertos
Best Independent Country Album or EP	Best Independent Dance or Electronica Album or EP
**Fanny Lumsden - Fallow**; Andy Golledge - Naomi; Casey Barnes - Town of a Million Dreams; Cool Sounds - Sleepers; Travis Collins - Wreck Me	**Banoffee - Look At Us Now Dad**; Haiku Hands - Haiku Hands; Lanks – Spirits Part 1; Lastlings – First Contact; Vlossom – My Friend
Best Independent Dance, Electronica or Club Single	Best Independent Heavy Album or EP
**DMA's – "Criminals" (The Avalanches remix)**; Flume featuring Toro y Moi - "The Difference"; PNAU featuring Ladyhawke - "River"; ShockOne – "Follow Me"; The Jungle Giants - "Sending Me UR Loving" (Tom Trago remix)	**Polaris - The Death of Me**; In Hearts Wake - Kaliyuga; Make Them Suffer - How to Survive a Funeral; Parkway Drive - Viva the Underdogs; Wolf & Cub - Nil
Best Independent Hip Hop Album or EP	Best Independent Jazz Album or EP
**Chillinit - The Octagon**; Charlie Threads - Say Less; Horrorshow - New Normal (Deluxe); Ryland Rose - Champion of the Losers; Christoph & Shaade - Big Mood	**Katie Noonan - The Sweetest Taboo**; Julien Wilson - Stock; Mildlife - Automatic; Party Dozen - Pray for Party Dozen; Vanessa Perica Orchestra - Love Is a Temporary Madness
Best Independent Pop Album or EP	Best Independent Punk Album or EP
**Gordi - Our Two Skins**; Cub Sport - Like Nirvana; Donny Benét - Mr Experience; Jack River - Stranger Heart; Tia Gostelow - Chrysalis	**The Chats - High Risk Behaviour**; A. Swayze & the Ghosts - Paid Salvation; Cable Ties - Far Enough; Cry Club - God I'm Such a Mess; Violent Soho - Everything Is A-OK
Best Independent Rock Album or EP	Best Independent Soul/R&B Album or EP
**DMA's - The Glow**; Lime Cordiale - 14 Steps to a Better You; Rolling Blackouts Costal Fever - Sideways to New Italy; Slowly Slowly - Race Car Blues; Spacey Janes - Sunlight	**Emma Donovan & the Putbacks - Crossover**; Jeida Woods - Hive; Kylie Auldist - This Is What Happiness Looks Like; Liyah Knight - Nesting; Serina Pech - Politics
Best Independent Label	2021 Outstanding Achievement Award
**I OH YOU**; ABC Music; Etcetc; Spinning Top; UNFD	**Deena Lynch (Jaguar Jonze)**

== See also ==
- Music of Australia
