= Live at the Forum (The Teskey Brothers album) =

Live album by The Teskey Brothers
- Released: 15 May 2020
- Recorded: November 2019
- Venue: The Forum, Melbourne
- Length: 79:48
- Label: Ivy League

The Teskey Brothers chronology
Run Home Slow (2019)	Live at the Forum (2020)	Live at Hamer Hall (2021)

Live at the Forum is the first live album by Australian indie blues rock band The Teskey Brothers and features songs from the band's two studio albums, Half Mile Harvest and Run Home Slow as well as a cover of John Lennon's "Jealous Guy". The album debuted at number 1 on the ARIA Charts; becoming the band's first chart topping album.

At the 2020 ARIA Music Awards it won Best Blues and Roots Album.

== Background and release ==
The Teskey Brothers' album Run Home Slow debuted at number 2 on the ARIA Charts, received critical acclaim, earning the band three ARIA Music Awards at the 2019 awards, four Music Victoria Awards, a Grammy Nomination for Best Engineer Album, Non-Classical and three APRA Awards.

In November 2019, recorded their sold-out four-night appearance at the Forum, Melbourne on analogue tape. Lead singer Sam Teskey said "We thought we'd try and record a live album with a tape machine, which is madness, but that's our format so it's the way we wanted to do it."

In March 2020, the group announced the release of the live album, including a limited edition double LP for Record Store Day on 18 April 2020. In April, restrictions related to the COVID-19 pandemic forced the band to change their plans and release date to 15 May. The band said "We were supposed to release a special Record Store Day version of this album but thanks to 'Rona [COVID-19], this day had to be postponed".

Across April and May 2020, the group supported the release with the Stay Home Slow Tour, a pun on their debut album's title that came about as the band was forced into isolation due to early pandemic regulations. The tour saw The Teskey Brothers periodically releasing a series of song stems, livestreams and live videos, some of which were recorded at The Forum.

== Critical reception ==
Professional ratings
Review scores
Source	Rating
Culture Fly	4/5 stars

Sam Townsend from GC Live said "Live at the Forum is an album full of unadulterated southern soul and blues sounds, an emotive set with sounds yearning for yesteryear, performed by a band who play to each others strengths and make magic in the process. The emphasis on vocal harmonies The Teskey Brothers revealed on Run Home Slow have come to fruition during their live shows and Live at the Forum effortlessly pulls and holds the listener for the full 80 minutes." calling it "an absolute joy to listen to."

Hal Horowitz from American Songwriter said "You won't wait long to get blown away". Horowitz added "It transports the experience of an obviously special run of shows into your home with all the soul stirring exhilaration The Teskey Brothers deliver when the band is in full flight."

== Track listing ==
All tracks are written by The Teskey Brothers (unless noted)

No.	Title	Length
1.	"Let Me Let You Down"	4:11
2.	"Carry You"	4:32
3.	"Crying Shame"	4:08
4.	"Say You'll Do"	4:49
5.	"So Caught Up"	3:50
6.	"I Get Up"	5:46
7.	"Rain"	4:21
8.	"Jealous Guy (John Lennon)"	4:02
9.	"San Francisco"	5:11
10.	"Honeymoon"	10:28
11.	"Paint My Heart"	8:46
12.	"Louisa"	9:01
13.	"Pain & Misery"	4:55
14.	"Hold Me"	5:47
Total length:		79:48

== Personnel ==
The Teskey Brothers are:

- Josh Teskey – vocals & rhythm guitar
- Sam Teskey – lead guitar
- Brendan Love – bass guitar
- Liam Gough – drums

== Charts ==
Chart performance for Live at the Forum
Chart (2020)	Peak position
Australian Albums (ARIA)	1
Dutch Albums (Album Top 100)	45

== Release history ==
Region	Date	Format(s)	Label	Catalogue
Various	15 May 2020	CD; digital download; streaming; Limited Edition 2xLP	Half Mile Harvest Recordings, Ivy League	IVY546 / IVY547
