= National Live Music Awards of 2020 =

Annual Australian music awards ceremony

- Date: 20 October 2020
- Venue: The Triffid, Brisbane, Queensland, Australia

Highlights
- Most nominations: Sampa The Great (3)
- Website: www.nlmas.com.au

The National Live Music Awards of 2020 were the 5th annual National Live Music Awards in Australia.

The nominees were revealed on 7 September 2020, which is when general public voting commences. The event occurred on 20 October 2020. The 2020 event was a hybrid digital & physical event in October 2020 due to the effects of the Covid-19 pandemic.

The 2020 awards are set to "celebrate the resilience of the live music sector in the wake of the COVID-19 pandemic". More than 40 awards have been sidelined from 2019's event, in part due to the difficulties of recognising an industry that was unable to tour for half of the eligibility period. Two new, permanent awards are being added to the event; the first, the finest work by Live Music Journalists in Australia and the second, Best International Tour, will award an Australian promoter for their work on an Australian tour, fronted by an International guest. In July 2020, founding board member Damian Cunningham said "The NLMAs is back to honour not only the fantastic artists and acts that have performed in Australia this year, but to shine a light on excellent the work done within the industry as response to the Covid-19 pandemic. This year has highlighted difficulties and hurdles never before seen within our industry which has had devastating effects. But as always, we have risen high and responded across the board, be it within TV or internet based concerts to drive-in style gigs. This industry is one that responds to any situation."

== National awards ==
Nominations and wins below.

Live Act of the Year

Artist	Result
Ball Park Music	Nominated
Genesis Owusu	Nominated
Sampa The Great	Won
Tropical Fuck Storm	Nominated
WAAX	Nominated

Live Voice of the Year

Artist	Result
Montaigne	Nominated
Ngaiire	Nominated
Sampa the Great	Nominated
Stella Donnelly	Nominated
Zaachariaha Fielding (of Electric Fields)	Won

Live Bassist of the Year

Artist	Result
Fiona Kitschin (of Tropical Fuck Storm)	Nominated
Grace Barbé	Nominated
Jennifer Aslett	Won
Joe Russo (of Rolling Blackouts Coastal Fever)	Nominated
Luke Henery (of Violent Soho)	Nominated

Live Drummer of the Year

Artist	Result
G Flip	Won
Lindy Morrison	Nominated
Talya Valenti	Nominated
Tim Commandeur	Nominated
Tom Bloomfield (of WAAX)	Nominated

Live Guitarist of the Year

Artist	Result
Bec Goring	Nominated
Courtney Barnett	Nominated
James Tidswell (of Violent Soho)	Nominated
Oscar Dawson (Holy Holy)	Nominated
Stu Mackenzie (of King Gizzard and the Lizard Wizard)	Won

Live Instrumentalist of the Year

Artist	Result
Kirsty Tickle	Nominated
Silentjay (instrumentalist for Sampa the Great)	Nominated
Toby Chew Lee	Nominated
Warren Ellis	Won
Zoe Davis (of Cub Sport)	Nominated

Best Live Music Festival or Event

Festival or Event	Result
BIGSOUND	Nominated
St Jerome's Laneway Festival	Nominated
WOMADelaide	Nominated
Woodford Folk Festival	Won
Yours and Owls Festival	Nominated

Best Live Music Photographer of the Year

Photographer	Result
Adrian Thompson	Nominated
Jess Gleeson	Won
Lauren Connelly	Nominated
Michelle Grace Hunder	Nominated
Tashi Hall	Nominated

Best Live Music Journalist of the Year

Photographer	Result
Hayden Davies	Nominated
Jules LeFevre	Nominated
Kate Hennessy	Nominated
Poppy Reid	Nominated
Sosefina Fuamoli	Won

Best International Tour in Australia

Tour and Promoter	Result
Elton John (Chugg & AEG)	Nominated
Orville Peck (Live Nation Entertainment & Secret Sounds)	Nominated
Sleaford Mods (Handsome Tours)	Nominated
The 1975 (Secret Sounds)	Nominated
TOOL (Frontier Touring Company)	Won

Industry Special Achievement

Name	Result	Notes
Isol-Aid	Won	
Listen Up Music	Won	
Stephen Wade (ALMBC)	Won	
Melbourne Digital Concert Hall	Won	
Support Act	Won	

Musicians Making a Difference

Name	Result	Rationale
E^ST	Nominated	For the open and honest lyrics on her album I'm Doing It tackle mental health, her open discussions on the subject and online performances.
Guy Sebastian	Won	For the incredible work done by The Sebastian Foundation and for his contributions to Fire Fight Australia and raising $200,000 with The Sony Foundation.
L-Fresh the Lion	Nominated	For his contributions to social change in the community, both in South Western Sydney and through his performances and outreach.
Mushroom Vision	Nominated	For The Sound; the TV program on the ABC uniting the industry to showcase live music during COVID-19.
Peking Duk	Nominated	For their relentless fundraising efforts during the 2019–2020 bushfire crisis and with Support Act, as well as their performance at Fire Fight Australia.

== State and Territory awards ==
- Note: The State and Territory awards are public voted, and for 2020, a single award for each state and territory will be awarded; the Best Live Act. Voting for these awards ran from 7 September - 24 September.

ACT Award – Presented by BMA Magazine
Live Act of the Year	Result
Aya Yves	Nominated
Citizen Kay	Nominated
Hope Wilkins	Nominated
Kirklandd	Nominated
Witchskull	Won

Northern Territory Awards – Presented by Foldback Magazine
Live Act of the Year	Result
Caiti Baker	Nominated
Kuya James	Nominated
Mambali	Won
Stevie Jean	Nominated
Serina Pech	Nominated

NSW Awards – Presented by 2SER
Live Act of the Year	Result
Caitlin Harnett & The Pony Boys	Won
DMA's	Nominated
Lime Cordiale	Nominated
Ngaiire	Nominated
Ruby Fields	Nominated

Queensland Awards
Live Act of the Year	Result
Jaguar Jonze	Won
Mallrat	Nominated
Miiesha	Nominated
Violent Soho	Nominated
WAAX	Nominated

South Australian Awards – Presented by Three D Radio
Live Act of the Year	Result
Bad//Dreems	Nominated
Bromham	Nominated
Lonelyspeck	Nominated
My Chérie	Won
West Thebarton	Nominated

Tasmanian Awards
Live Act of the Year	Result
A. Swayze & the Ghosts	Nominated
Chase City	Nominated
EWAH & The Vision of Paradise	Nominated
Meres	Nominated
Slag Queens	Won

Victorian Awards – Presented by SYN Media
Live Act of the Year	Result
Alice Ivy	Nominated
Cable Ties	Nominated
Ceres	Won
Kira Puru	Nominated
Sampa the Great	Nominated

West Australian Awards – Presented by Dailymotion
Live Act of the Year	Result
Great Gable	Nominated
Stella Donnelly	Nominated
Sly Withers	Won
Southern River Band	Nominated
Your Girl Pho	Nominated
