= Sam Teskey =

Australian blues musician

- Born: Sam Teskey; 1989 (age 36–37)
- Origin: Warrandyte, Victoria, Australia
- Occupations: Singer; songwriter; guitarist; musician
- Instruments: Vocals; guitar
- Years active: 2008–present
- Label: Ivy League
- Member of: The Teskey Brothers
- Website: samteskey.com

Sam Teskey (born 1989) is an Australian blues musician, best known for his work with the Teskey Brothers. Sam won the ARIA Award for Engineer of the Year in 2019.

His debut studio album, Cycles, was released on 8 October 2021 via Ivy League Records.

== Life and career ==
=== 1989–2007: Early life ===
Sam Teskey was born in 1989 at his parents home in Warrandyte, Victoria, in the room above what is now their studio. He attended a local primary school with no year levels. He was close to his brother Josh, with Josh saying in 2021, "We had these bird calls we'd do so we could always find each other in bush near where we lived. We also used them at parties when we were teenagers. I'd do the call and Sam would materialise out of the crowd." The two started playing music together after moving to a Steiner high school when Josh was 15 and Sam 13. Josh said "I jumped straight into singing and then played guitar, but Sam focused on the guitar".

=== 2008–present: The Teskey Brothers ===
In 2008, Josh and Sam formed the blues rock band, the Teskey Brothers alongside Brendon Love and Liam Gough. The band became a fixture at the St Andrews Market, performing at regular spots in Warrandyte and bars in Melbourne, as well as other private shows. The band released their debut studio album, Half Mile Harvest in 2017 which peaked at number 18 on the ARIA Charts. The band's second studio album, Run Home Slow was released in 2019 and peaked at number 2 on the ARIA Charts and won three ARIA Music Awards at the 2019 awards.

=== 2020–present: Solo career and Cycles ===
On 13 July 2021, Teskey announced the release of his debut solo album Cycles, followed by his first solo nationwide tour and lead single "Love". Cycles was released on 8 October 2021.

== Discography ==
=== Studio albums ===
List of studio albums, with release date and label
Title	Album details	Peak chart positions
Title	Album details	AUS
Cycles	Released: 8 October 2021; Label: Ivy League (IVY713); Format: CD, LP, digital download, streaming	89

=== Singles ===
List of singles, with year released and album name shown
Title	Year	Album
"Love"	2021	Cycles
"Til the River Takes Us Home"	2021	Cycles
"Let the Sun Bring the Light"	2021	Cycles

== Awards and nominations ==
=== APRA Awards ===
The APRA Awards are held in Australia and New Zealand by the Australasian Performing Right Association to recognise songwriting skills, sales and airplay performance by its members annually. Josh Teskey has been nominated for three awards.

Year	Nominee / work	Award	Result	Ref.
2019	"Forever You and Me" ( with Liam Gough, Brendon Love and Josh Teskey)	Song of the Year	Shortlisted	
2020	"I Get Up" (alongside Liam Gough, Brendon Love, and Josh Teskey)	Song of the Year	Nominated	
2020	"I Get Up" (alongside Liam Gough, Brendon Love, and Josh Teskey)	Most Performed Blues & Roots Work of the Year	Nominated	
2020	The Teskey Brothers (with Liam Gough, Brendon Love and Josh Teskey)	Breakthrough Songwriter of the Year	Nominated	
2021	"Rain" (alongside Liam Gough, Brendon Love and Josh Teskey)	Most Performed R&B / Soul Work	Won	
2024	"Take My Heart" (Josh and Sam Teskey)	Song of the Year	Shortlisted	
2024	"Oceans of Emotions" (Josh and Sam Teskey)	Most Performed R&B / Soul Work	Nominated	
2024	The Teskey Brothers (Josh and Sam Teskey)	Songwriter of the Year	Won	

=== ARIA Awards ===
The ARIA Music Awards is an annual awards ceremony that recognises excellence, innovation, and achievement across all genres of Australian music.

Year	Nominee / work	Award	Result	Ref.
2019	Sam Teskey for the Teskey Brothers – Run Home Slow	Engineer of the Year	Won	
2023	Eric J Dobowsky, Sam Teskey, Wayne Connelly for The Teskey Brothers – The Winding Way	Best Engineered Release	Nominated	

=== Music Victoria Awards ===
The Music Victoria Awards are an annual awards night recognising Victorian music. They commenced in 2006.

Year	Nominee / work	Award	Result	Ref.
2023	Sam Teskey	Best Musician	Nominated	
