= ARIA Award for Engineer of the Year =

Australian musical award

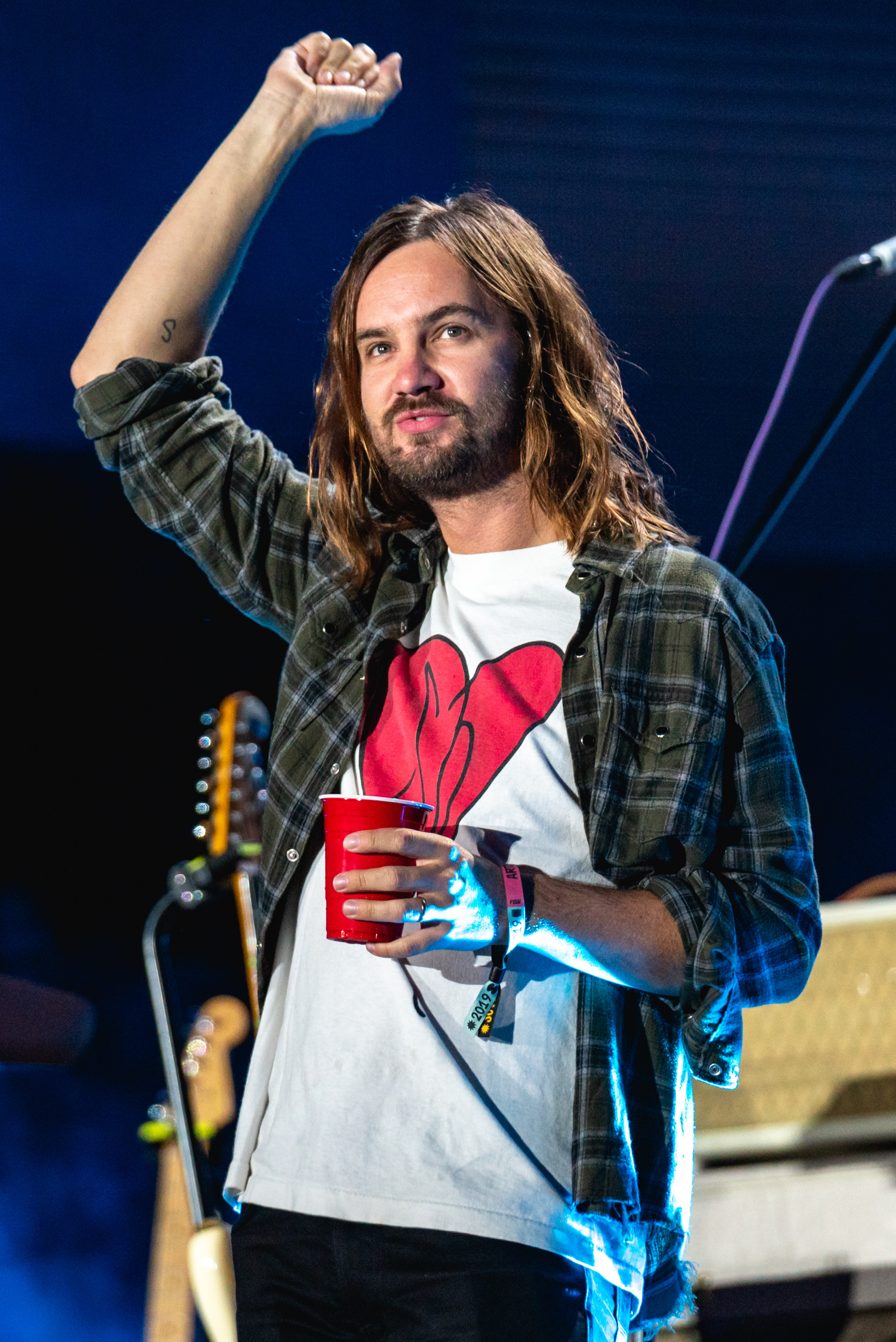
- 2026 winner Kevin Parker of Tame Impala
- Country: Australia
- Presented by: Australian Recording Industry Association (ARIA)
- First award: 1987
- Currently held by: Kevin Parker for Deadbeat by Tame Impala (2026)
- Website: ariaawards.com.au

The ARIA Music Award for Engineer of the Year, is an award presented within the Artisan Awards at the annual ARIA Music Awards. The ARIA Awards recognise "the many achievements of Australian artists across all music genres", and have been given by the Australian Recording Industry Association (ARIA) since 1987.

The award is given to the audio engineer(s) who is from, or resides in Australia, and has overall responsibility for the work's production. The accolade is restricted to "A single track, multiple tracks, or an entire album may be submitted for each engineer. DVD releases are not eligible. Only work released during the period of eligibility will be considered. International product is eligible but entrants must accord with the general eligibility criteria for artists. In the case of a co-engineer, all parties must individually meet the artist eligibility criteria." Engineer of the Year is voted for by a judging school, which consists of between 40 and 100 representatives experienced with that genre of music.

== Winners and nominees ==
In the following table, the winner is highlighted in a separate colour, and in boldface; the nominees are those that are not highlighted or in boldface. Nominees for some years are not available in published sources. Both Matt Lovell and Wayne Connolly have received the award three times.

The years listed in the first column relate to the year and edition of the awards ceremony. The second column indicates the audio engineer(s) responsible for the work. The "Work title(s) and original recording artist(s)" column names the work(s) whose engineering has been nominated, and its original recording artist; the musician is not the nominee unless they were the engineer.

=== Engineer of the Year ===
Winner marked in a separate colour

Year	Engineer(s)	Work title(s) and original recording artist(s)
**1987** (1st)
**1987** (1st)	**Alan Wright**	**Sex and Fame** by **Jump Incorporated**
**1987** (1st)	Phillip Abraham	Whispering Jack by John Farnham
**1987** (1st)	Guy Gray	Show Me by Flotsam Jetsam
**1987** (1st)	Jim Tait	Wa Wa Nee by Wa Wa Nee
**1987** (1st)	Phillip Abraham	"You Are Soul" by Doug Mulray & the Rude Band
**1988** (2nd)
**1988** (2nd)	**David Nicholas**	**Glory Road** by **Richard Clapton**
**1988** (2nd)	**David Nicholas**	**Kick** by **INXS**
**1989** (3rd)
**1989** (3rd)	**Doug Brady**	"**Iron Lung**" by **Big Pig**
**1989** (3rd)	**Doug Brady**	**Hold On to Me** by **The Black Sorrows**
**1989** (3rd)	**Doug Brady**	**Age of Reason** by **John Farnham**
**1989** (3rd)	**Doug Brady**	"**River**" by **Dragon**
**1989** (3rd)	**Doug Brady**	**Children of the Western World** by **Steve Grace**
**1989** (3rd)	**Doug Brady**	"**Cars and Planes**" by **Machinations**
**1989** (3rd)	**Doug Brady**	"**Change My Sex**", "**When the World Came Down**" by **Separate Tables**
**1989** (3rd)	**Doug Brady**	"**Real Love**", "**So Lonely Now**" by **The State**
**1989** (3rd)	David Price	Groove by Eurogliders
**1989** (3rd)	David Price	"Home" by Noiseworks
**1989** (3rd)	Guy Gray	"Dark Age" by The Hippos
**1989** (3rd)	Guy Gray	"Pick You Up" by Tony Llewellyn
**1989** (3rd)	Guy Gray	"Dreamworld" by Midnight Oil
**1989** (3rd)	Guy Gray	"Clarity of Mind" by Spy vs Spy
**1989** (3rd)	Ian McKenzie	Chantoozies by Chantoozies
**1989** (3rd)	Jim Bonnefond	...ish by 1927
**1989** (3rd)	Jim Bonnefond	Fingertips by The Cockroaches
**1990** (4th)	**Alan Wright**	—N/a
**1991** (5th)
**1991** (5th)	**David Nicholas**	Work(s) by **Midnight Oil**
**1991** (5th)	**David Nicholas**	Work(s) by **Jenny Morris**
**1991** (5th)	**Doug Brady**	Work(s) by **Tina Arena**
**1991** (5th)	**Doug Brady**	Work(s) by **Southern Sons**
**1991** (5th)	**Doug Brady**	Work(s) by **John Farnham**
**1991** (5th)	**Doug Brady**	Work(s) by **Skyhooks**
**1992** (6th)
**1992** (6th)	**David Price**, **Greg Henderson**, **Simon Polinski**, **Ted Howard**	"**Maralitja**", "**Dharpa**", "**Treaty**", "**Treaty (Filthy Lucre Remix)**", "**Tribal Voice**" by **Yothu Yindi**
**1992** (6th)	Doug Roberts	"Release Me", "White Roses", "Someday" by Deborah Conway
**1992** (6th)	Nick Mainsbridge	"Water" by Def FX
**1992** (6th)	Nick Mainsbridge	"Blind Love Don't Go Now" by Ratcat
**1992** (6th)	Nick Mainsbridge	"Lifeboat" by Tall Tales and True
**1992** (6th)	Paul Kosky	"Chocolate Cake", Woodface by Crowded House
**1992** (6th)	Peter Cobbin	"Crazy", "Fever", "Stormy Weather", "That Ole Devil Called Love" by Grace Knight
**1993** (7th)
**1993** (7th)	**Greg Henderson**	"**Djäpana (Sunset Dreaming)**", "**Tribal Voice**" by **Yothu Yindi**
**1993** (7th)	Adrian Bolland	"Boy in the Moon", "Cover to Cover" by Margaret Urlich
**1993** (7th)	Adrian Bolland	"Can't Help Myself", "Love How You Love Me" by Teen Queens
**1993** (7th)	Doug Brady	"Scars" by 1927
**1993** (7th)	Doug Brady	"What a Lover" by Eve
**1993** (7th)	Doug Brady	"Cry", "So Dangerous" by Lisa Edwards
**1993** (7th)	Doug Roberts	"Keep the Ball Rolling" by Stephen Cummings
**1993** (7th)	Niven Garland	"Baby Don't Cry", "Heaven Sent", "Taste It" by INXS
**1994** (8th)
**1994** (8th)	**Simon Hussey**	"**Barren Ground**", "**The World as It Is**" by **Daryl Braithwaite**
**1994** (8th)	**Simon Hussey**	"**Baby, You're a Rich Man**", "**Daddy's Gonna Make You a Star**" by **Company of Strangers**
**1994** (8th)	Mark Forrester	"Funky Junky", "Let's Get It On" by Peter Andre
**1994** (8th)	Mark Forrester	"Lighting Fires", "Surround Me" by Grant McLennan
**1994** (8th)	Michael Letho	"Barren Ground", "The World as It Is", "Breaking the Rules", "Look What Your Love Has Done" by Daryl Braithwaite
**1994** (8th)	Nick Mainsbridge, Kalju Tonuma	"Scratch My Back", "Yeah I Want You", "Train of Thought" by The Sharp
**1994** (8th)	Tony Cohen	"The Honeymoon Is Over" by The Cruel Sea
**1994** (8th)	Tony Cohen	"Waiting" by Tiddas
**1994** (8th)	Tony Cohen	"You're Just Too Hip Baby" by Dave Graney & the Coral Snakes
**1995** (9th)
**1995** (9th)	**Paul McKercher**, **Tony Cohen**	**Three Legged Dog** by **The Cruel Sea**
**1995** (9th)	Cameron Craig	
**1995** (9th)	Craig Portelis	
**1995** (9th)	Doug Brady	
**1995** (9th)	Doug Roberts	
**1995** (9th)	Mark Forrester	
**1996** (10th)
**1996** (10th)	**Wayne Connolly**	**Hourly, Daily** by **You Am I**
**1996** (10th)	Chris Dickie	"Homebaker", "Hallowed Ground" by Six Mile High
**1996** (10th)	Chris Dickie	"Restoration" by Header
**1996** (10th)	Doug Brady	Romeo's Heart by John Farnham
**1996** (10th)	Magoo	Tu-Plang by Regurgitator
**1996** (10th)	Tom Whitten	"Pick You Up" by Powderfinger
**1996** (10th)	Tom Whitten	Sister K by Automatic
**1996** (10th)	Tom Whitten	Double Yellow Tarred by Bluebottle Kiss
**1997** (11th)
**1997** (11th)	**Charles Fisher**	**Savage Garden** by **Savage Garden**
**1997** (11th)	Charles Dickie	"Chained to the Wheel", "Chosen Ones", "New Craze" by the Black Sorrows
**1997** (11th)	Charles Dickie	"Tease Me" by Paul Kelly
**1997** (11th)	David Bridie	"Hearts on Fire" by John Farnham
**1997** (11th)	Phil McKellar	Ivy and the Big Apples by Spiderbait
**1997** (11th)	Phil McKellar	"Good Mornin'", "Tuesday" by You Am I
**1998** (12th)
**1998** (12th)	**Magoo**	"**Another Childish Man**", "**Breathing Through My Eyes**", "**Pulse**", "**Opportunist**" by **Skunkhour**
**1998** (12th)	**Magoo**	**Unit** by **Regurgitator**
**1998** (12th)	**Magoo**	"**White Skin** / **Black Heart**" by **Midnight Oil**
**1998** (12th)	**Nick Launay**	"**The Door**" by **Silverchair**
**1998** (12th)	Nigel Derricks	From Here to Wherever by Cordrazine
**1998** (12th)	Rob Taylor	Eternal Nightcap by The Whitlams
**1998** (12th)	Tony Espie	Ghosts except "Halcyon Days" by Wendy Matthews
**1999** (13th)
**1999** (13th)	**Nick Launay**	"**24000**", "**Come to Take You Home"**, "**Supposed to Be Here**", "**This Is the Sound**" by **Primary**
**1999** (13th)	**Nick Launay**	**Neon Ballroom** by **Silverchair**
**1999** (13th)	Josh Abrahams	Sweet Distorted Holiday by Josh Abrahams
**1999** (13th)	Kalju Tonuma	"Hardcore Adore" by Felicity Hunter
**1999** (13th)	Kalju Tonuma	Kid Indestructible by 28 Days
**1999** (13th)	Kalju Tonuma	"Puberty Song" by The Mavis's
**1999** (13th)	Magoo	"Pump It Up" by Automatic
**1999** (13th)	Magoo	Redneck Wonderland by Midnight Oil
**1999** (13th)	Phil McKellar	Grand Slam by Spiderbait
**2000** (14th)
**2000** (14th)	**Steve James**	"**My Friend**" by **Oblivia**
**2000** (14th)	Brent Clarke	"Sunshine on a Rainy Day" by Christine Anu
**2000** (14th)	Doug Brady	Live at the Regent by John Farnham
**2000** (14th)	Iva Davies, Simon Leadley	The Ghost of Time by Iva Davies
**2000** (14th)	Jonathan Burnside	Easy by Grinspoon
**2001** (15th)
**2001** (15th)	**Chris Dickie**, **Chris Thompson**, **Paul McKercher**, **Richard Pleasance**	**Sunset Studies** by **Augie March**
**2001** (15th)	Doug Brady	33 1/3 by John Farnham
**2001** (15th)	Kalju Tonuma	The Prize Recruit by Superheist
**2001** (15th)	Nick Launay	Roll On by The Living End
**2001** (15th)	Tony Espie, Bobbydazzler (a.k.a. Darren Seltmann, Robbie Chater)	Since I Left You by The Avalanches
**2002** (16th)
**2002** (16th)	**Anton Hagop**	**Diorama** by **Silverchair**
**2002** (16th)	Adam Rhodes, DW Norton	"A Dignified Rage" by Superheist
**2002** (16th)	Daniel Denholm	Torch the Moon by The Whitlams
**2002** (16th)	Paul Mac	3000 Feet High by Paul Mac
**2002** (16th)	Phil McKellar	"Chemical Heart" by Grinspoon
**2003** (17th)
**2003** (17th)	**Chris Thompson**	**Up All Night** by **The Waifs**
**2003** (17th)	David Leonard	Begins Here by The Butterfly Effect
**2003** (17th)	Lindsay Gravina	Tough Love by Magic Dirt
**2003** (17th)	Paul McKercher	Feeler by Pete Murray
**2003** (17th)	Vince Pizzinga	Innocent Eyes by Delta Goodrem
**2004** (18th)
**2004** (18th)	**Paul McKercher**, **Eskimo Joe**	**A Song Is a City** by **Eskimo Joe**
**2004** (18th)	Andy Baldwin	The Cat Empire by The Cat Empire
**2004** (18th)	Brent Clarke	Distant Light by Alex Lloyd
**2004** (18th)	Matt Lovell	Braxton Hicks by Jebediah
**2004** (18th)	Phil McKellar	Between Birth and Death by Sunk Loto
**2004** (18th)	Robyn Mal	Sunrise Over Sea by John Butler Trio
**2005** (19th)
**2005** (19th)	**Matt Lovell**	**Notes from a Ceiling** by **The Mess Hall**
**2005** (19th)	David Nicholas	The Way Out by Drag
**2005** (19th)	James Ash	"Voodoo Child" by Rogue Traders
**2005** (19th)	Paul McKercher	BigBigLove by Little Birdy
**2005** (19th)	Paul McKercher, Eskimo Joe	"Older Than You" by Eskimo Joe
**2006** (20th)
**2006** (20th)	**Matt Lovell**	**Black Fingernails, Red Wine** by **Eskimo Joe**
**2006** (20th)	Adam Rhodes	Cities: The Cat Empire Project by The Cat Empire
**2006** (20th)	Nick Launay	State of Emergency by The Living End
**2006** (20th)	Paul McKercher	Various tracks on Moo, You Bloody Choir by Augie March
**2006** (20th)	Wayne Connolly	Vision Valley by The Vines
**2007** (21st)
**2007** (21st)	**Wayne Connolly**	**Memories & Dust** by **Josh Pyke**
**2007** (21st)	Doug Brady	The Swing Sessions by David Campbell
**2007** (21st)	Magoo	"Just a Song About Ping Pong" by Operator Please
**2007** (21st)	Paul McKercher	What the Sea Wants, the Sea Will Have by Sarah Blasko
**2007** (21st)	Peter Dolso	Sneaky Sound System by Sneaky Sound System
**2008** (22nd)
**2008** (22nd)	**Matt Lovell**, **Shihad**	**Beautiful Machine** by **Shihad**
**2008** (22nd)	Anthony Lycenko	Summer at Eureka by Pete Murray
**2008** (22nd)	James Ash	Better in the Dark by Rogue Traders
**2008** (22nd)	Scott Horscroft	Apocalypso by The Presets
**2008** (22nd)	Scott Horscroft	Cruel Guards by The Panics
**2009** (23rd)
**2009** (23rd)	**DJ Debris**	**State of the Art** by **Hilltop Hoods**
**2009** (23rd)	**Greg Wales**	**Dilettantes** by **You Am I**
**2009** (23rd)	Jimi Maroudas	Inshalla by Eskimo Joe
**2009** (23rd)	Peter Mayes	Walking on a Dream by Empire of the Sun
**2009** (23rd)	Steven Schram	Confetti by Little Birdy
**2010** (24th)
**2010** (24th)	**Wayne Connolly**	"**Fast Friends**" by **Paul Dempsey**
**2010** (24th)	Jeff McCormack	Both Sides Now by Adam Harvey
**2010** (24th)	John Castle	I Believe You Liar by Washington
**2010** (24th)	Rick Will	Six to Midnight by Grinspoon
**2010** (24th)	Victor Van Vugt	Modern Day Addiction by Clare Bowditch
**2011** (25th)
**2011** (25th)	**François Tétaz**	"**Somebody That I Used to Know**" by **Gotye** featuring **Kimbra**
**2011** (25th)	Dave Parkin	"Rapunzel" by Drapht
**2011** (25th)	Greg Clarke	Tangier by Billy Thorpe
**2011** (25th)	Matt Lovell	Ghosts of the Past by Eskimo Joe
**2011** (25th)	Wayne Connolly	"No One Wants a Lover" by Josh Pyke
**2012** (26th)
**2012** (26th)	**François Tétaz**	**Making Mirrors** by **Gotye**
**2012** (26th)	Lachlan Mitchell	Prisoner by The Jezabels
**2012** (26th)	Matt Fell	Australian Idle by Tim Freedman
**2012** (26th)	Scott Horscroft, Phillip Threlfall	Falling & Flying by 360
**2012** (26th)	Wayne Connolly	Only Sparrows by Josh Pyke
**2013** (27th)
**2013** (27th)	**Virginia Read**	**All Imperfect Things** by **Sally Whitwell**
**2013** (27th)	Dann Hume	"Seeing Red" by Alpine
**2013** (27th)	Kevin Parker	Lonerism by Tame Impala
**2013** (27th)	Nicky Bomba, Robin Mai	Melbourne Ska Orchestra by Melbourne Ska Orchestra
**2013** (27th)	Peter Mayes	Ice on the Dune by Empire of the Sun
**2014** (28th)
**2014** (28th)	**Eric J Dubowsky** (a.k.a. **Eric J**)	**Built on Glass** by **Nicholas Murphy** (a.k.a. **Chet Faker**)
**2014** (28th)	Dustin Tebbutt	Bones EP by Dustin Tebbutt
**2014** (28th)	Matthew Lambert (a.k.a. Suffa), Barry Francis (a.k.a. DJ Debris)	Walking Under Stars by Hilltop Hoods
**2014** (28th)	Nicholas Wilson, Dann Hume	Land of Pleasure by Sticky Fingers
**2014** (28th)	Paul McKercher	Sea of Approval by Andy Bull
**2014** (28th)	Virginia Read	Gershwin: Take Two by Simon Tedeschi, James Morrison, Sarah McKenzie
**2015** (29th)
**2015** (29th)	**Kevin Parker**	**Currents** by **Tame Impala**
**2015** (29th)	Adrian Breakspear, Peter Holz	"Radioface" by Gang of Youths
**2015** (29th)	Mitch Kenny	Dark Night Sweet Light by Hermitude
**2015** (29th)	Nick DiDia	Beautiful You by The Waifs
**2015** (29th)	Virginia Read	Brandenburg Celebrates by Australian Brandenburg Orchestra
**2016** (30th)
**2016** (30th)	**Eric J Dubowsky** (a.k.a. **Eric J**), **Harley Streten** (a.k.a. **Flume**)	**Skin** by **Flume**
**2016** (30th)	Alex Hope	Blue Neighbourhood by Troye Sivan
**2016** (30th)	M-Phazes	"Papercuts" (featuring Vera Blue) by Illy
**2016** (30th)	Nick DiDia	Civil Dusk by Bernard Fanning
**2016** (30th)	Robbie Chater, Tony Espie	Wildflower by The Avalanches
**2017** (31st)
**2017** (31st)	**Steven Schram**	**Life Is Fine** by **Paul Kelly**
**2017** (31st)	Adrian Breakspear	Go Farther in Lightness by Gang of Youths
**2017** (31st)	Bob Scott	Live at the Sydney Opera House by Kate Miller-Heidke & Sydney Symphony Orchestra
**2017** (31st)	John Castle	"Lose My Mind" by Dean Lewis
**2017** (31st)	Oliver Hugh Perry (a.k.a. D.D Dumbo), Fabian Prynn	Utopia Defeated by D.D Dumbo
**2018** (32nd)
**2018** (32nd)	**Burke Reid**	**Tell Me How You Really Feel** by **Courtney Barnett**
**2018** (32nd)	Dann Hume & M-Phazes	"I Said Hi" by Amy Shark
**2018** (32nd)	Holly Rankin, Xavier Dunn & John Castle	Sugar Mountain by Jack River
**2018** (32nd)	Sam Cromack	Good Mood by Ball Park Music
**2018** (32nd)	Ted Howard, Robin Mai & Matthew Cunliffe	Djarimirri (Child of the Rainbow) by Gurrumul
**2019** (33rd)
**2019** (33rd)	**Sam Teskey**	**Run Home Slow** by **The Teskey Brothers**
**2019** (33rd)	Burke Reid	Crushing by Julia Jacklin
**2019** (33rd)	Kevin Parker	"Patience" by Tame Impala
**2019** (33rd)	Konstantin Kersting	"Dance Monkey" by Tones and I
**2019** (33rd)	Plutonic Lab	The Great Expanse by Hilltop Hoods
**2020** (34th)
**2020** (34th)	**Kevin Parker**	**The Slow Rush** by **Tame Impala**
**2020** (34th)	Alice Ivy	Don't Sleep by Alice Ivy
**2020** (34th)	Greg Wales	Everything Is A-OK by Violent Soho
**2020** (34th)	Eric J Dubowsky	Free Time by Ruel
**2020** (34th)	IAMMXO (aka Mohamed Komba)	Nyaaringu by Miiesha
**2021** (35th)
**2021** (35th)	**Konstantin Kersting**	**Love Signs** by **The Jungle Giants**
**2021** (35th)	**Konstantin Kersting**	**0202** by **The Rubens**
**2021** (35th)	**Konstantin Kersting**	**"Masterpiece"** by **The Rubens**
**2021** (35th)	Chris Collins	Budjerah (EP) by Budjerah
**2021** (35th)	Chris Collins	Rehearsal by Skegss
**2021** (35th)	Chris Collins	Necessary Evil by Tyne-James Organ
**2021** (35th)	Eric J Dubowsky	0202 by The Rubens
**2021** (35th)	Matt Corby	Budjerah (EP) by Budjerah
**2021** (35th)	Tony Espie	Child in Reverse by Kate Miller-Heidke
**2021** (35th)	Tony Espie	We Will Always Love You by The Avalanches

=== Mix Engineer - Best Mixed Album ===
Year	Engineer(s)	Work title(s) and original recording artist(s)
**2022** (36th)
**2022** (36th)	**Pip Norman, Andrei Eremin & Dave Hammer**	**Gela by Baker Boy**
**2022** (36th)	Cassian	Surrender by Rüfüs Du Sol
**2022** (36th)	Dann Hume & Eric J Dubowsky	Conversations by Budjerah
**2022** (36th)	Eric J Dubowsky	Palaces by Flume
**2022** (36th)	Paul McKercher	Weirder & Weirder by Ball Park Music

=== Best Engineered Release ===
Year	Engineer(s)	Work title(s) and original recording artist(s)
**2023** (37th)
**2023** (37th)	**Styalz Fuego**	**"Rush" by Troye Sivan**
**2023** (37th)	Dann Hume, Chris Collins, Matt Corby	Everything's Fine by Matt Corby
**2023** (37th)	Dom Dolla	"Eat Your Man" by Dom Dolla
**2023** (37th)	Eric J Dobowsky, Sam Teskey, Wayne Connelly	The Winding Way by The Teskey Brothers
**2023** (37th)	Simon Cohen, Dave Hammer	Struggler by Genesis Owusu
**2024** (38th)
**2024** (38th)	**Chris Collins**	**Pratts & Pain by Royel Otis**
**2024** (38th)	Dom Dolla	"Saving Up" by Dom Dolla
**2024** (38th)	Eric J Debowsky	Cape Forestier by Angus & Julia Stone
**2024** (38th)	Luke Steele, Nick Littlemore and Peter Mayes	Ask That God by Empire of the Sun
**2024** (38th)	Tony Buchen	Chorus by Mildlife
**2025** (39th)
**2025** (39th)	**Kevin Parker**	**"End of Summer" by Tame Impala**
**2025** (39th)	Alice Ivy	Do What Makes You Happy by Alice Ivy
**2025** (39th)	Dom Dolla	"Dreamin'" by Dom Dolla
**2025** (39th)	Eric J Dubowsky	Dumb by Emma Louise and Flume
**2025** (39th)	Thomas Purcell (Wave Racer)	I Love My Computer by Ninajirachi
**2026** (40th)
**2026** (40th)	**Kevin Parker**	**Deadbeat by Tame Impala**
**2026** (40th)	Dom Dolla	"Don't Worry Baby" by Dom Dolla
**2026** (40th)	Wave Racer	"Star Scum City" by 2Charm
**2026** (40th)	Styalz Fuego	"She's the Best" by Troye Sivan
**2026** (40th)	Tony Buchen	Marshmellow by Dobby
