= The Winding Way =

Studio album by the Teskey Brothers
- Released: 16 June 2023
- Studio: Sydney
- Length: 46:19
- Label: Ivy League
- Producer: Eric J Dubowsky

The Teskey Brothers chronology
Live at Hamer Hall (2021)	The Winding Way (2023)

Singles from The Winding Way
- 1. "This Will Be Our Year" Released: 11 November 2022; 2. "Oceans of Emotions" Released: 14 February 2023; 3. "Take My Heart" Released: 24 March 2023; 4. "London Bridge" Released: 19 April 2023; 5. "Remember the Time" Released: 26 May 2023

The Winding Way is the third studio album by Australian indie blues rock band, the Teskey Brothers, released on 16 June 2023. The album was announced on 14 February 2023 alongside the release of the second single "Oceans of Emotions".

The album was recorded in Sydney with producer Eric J Dubowsky. About the collaboration, Sam Teskey said, "We didn't want to go for a producer that was too close to our genre, we just wanted to branch out a bit and try to explore someone who was a bit down a different avenue."

At the 2023 ARIA Music Awards, the album was nominated for Album of the Year, Best Blues & Roots Album, Best Group and Best Engineered Release.

The album won Best Record at the 2024 Rolling Stone Australia Awards.

At the AIR Awards of 2024, the album was nominated for Best Independent Blues and Roots Album or EP while the album was nominated for Independent Marketing Team of the Year.

== Track listing ==
The Winding Way track listing
No.	Title	Writer(s)	Length
1.	"I'm Leaving"	Josh Teskey, Sam Teskey	4:21
2.	"Oceans of Emotions"	Josh Teskey, Sam Teskey	3:53
3.	"Take My Heart"	Josh Teskey, Sam Teskey	4:18
4.	"London Bridge"	Josh Teskey, Sam Teskey	5:27
5.	"Carry Me Home"	Josh Teskey, Sam Teskey, Eric J Dubowsky	4:00
6.	"This Will Be Our Year"	Chris White	2:37
7.	"Blind Without You"	Josh Teskey, Sam Teskey, Paul Beard, Dubowsky	4:43
8.	"Rich Man"	Josh Teskey, Sam Teskey	5:06
9.	"Remember the Time"	Josh Teskey, Sam Teskey	4:12
10.	"What Will Be"	Josh Teskey, Sam Teskey	7:42
Total length:			46:19

== Charts ==
=== Weekly charts ===
Chart performance for The Winding Way
Chart (2023)	Peak position
Australian Albums (ARIA)	1
Dutch Albums (Album Top 100)	6
German Albums (Offizielle Top 100)	46
New Zealand Albums (RMNZ)	11
Scottish Albums (OCC)	36
UK Albums (OCC)	50

=== Year-end charts ===
2023 year-end chart performance for The Winding Way
Chart (2023)	Position
Australian Artist Albums (ARIA)	27

== Release history ==
Release history and formats for The Winding Way
Region	Date	Format(s)	Label	Catalogue	Ref.
Australia	16 June 2023	Vinyl	Ivy League	IVY909 / IVY913	
Various	16 June 2023	CD; digital download; streaming	Ivy League	IVY915	
