= Live at Hamer Hall =

Live album by The Teskey Brothers with Orchestra Victoria
- Released: 3 December 2021
- Recorded: December 2020
- Venue: Hamer Hall, Melbourne
- Length: 56:25
- Label: Ivy League

The Teskey Brothers chronology
Live at the Forum (2020)	Live at Hamer Hall (2021)	The Winding Way (2023)

Live at Hamer Hall is the second live album by Australian indie blues rock band The Teskey Brothers with Orchestra Victoria. The album was announced in October 2021 and released on 3 December 2021. The album features songs from their two studio albums and two new Christmas songs. It debuted at number 11 on the ARIA Charts.

At the AIR Awards of 2022, the album was nominated for Best Independent Blues and Roots Album or EP.

At the 2022 ARIA Music Awards, the album was nominated for Best Blues and Roots Album.

== Background and release ==
On 22 December 2020, The Teskey Brothers performed a live-streamed digital concert with Orchestra Victoria at Hamer Hall, Melbourne. The song reimagined by arranger Jamie Messenger.

== Critical reception ==
Professional ratings
Review scores
Source	Rating
The AU Review	4/5 stars

Jeff Jenkins from Stack Music called it "a splendid live album" saying "the strings send their soulful sound soaring".

Dylan Marshall from The AU Review said "Live at Hamer Hall isn’'t a traditional live album in the way you'd normally expect a 'live' album to be recorded, and it's for this reason the album doesn't quite reach the heights you'd hope it would. Sure it's polished and sounds outstanding, but lacks the body and vibe you'd want and hope for from a live album".

== Track listing ==
All tracks are written by The Teskey Brothers (unless noted)

No.	Title	Length
1.	"Let Me Let You Down"	4:03
2.	"Carry You"	4:26
3.	"Say You'll Do"	4:49
4.	"I Get Up"	5:42
5.	"Rain"	4:36
6.	"San Francisco"	5:15
7.	"So Caught Up"	3:56
8.	"Dreaming of a Christmas with You"	4:19
9.	"Highway Home for Christmas"	4:37
10.	"Paint My Heart"	9:15
11.	"Hold Me"	5:27
Total length:		56:25

== Personnel ==
The Teskey Brothers are:

- Josh Teskey – vocals & guitar
- Sam Teskey – guitar
- Liam Gough – drums
- Olaf Scott - piano, organ
- Nicholas Buc - conductor

== Charts ==
Chart performance for Live at the Forum
Chart (2021)	Peak position
Australian Albums (ARIA)	11
