= Idiot Proverbs =

Studio album by Tiny Little Houses
- Released: 12 January 2018
- Recorded: Melbourne, Australia
- Genre: Alternative rock; indie rock
- Length: 36:51
- Label: Ivy League Records (AUS)
- Producer: Steven Schram

Tiny Little Houses chronology
Snow Globe (2016)	Idiot Proverbs (2018)	Misericorde (2021)

Singles from Idiot Proverbs
- 1. "Garbage Bin" Released: 7 July 2017; 2. "Entitled Generation" Released: 20 October 2017; 3. "Short Hair" Released: 2 February 2018

Professional ratings
Review scores
Source	Rating
TheMusic	3.5/5 stars
Sputnikmusic	4/5 stars
The AU Review	8/10 stars

Idiot Proverbs is the debut studio album by Australian indie rock band Tiny Little Houses. It was released through Ivy League Records in January 2018. Australian radio station Triple J picked Idiot Proverbs as their feature album of the week in January 2018.

== Track listing ==
All music is composed by Tiny Little Houses (Caleb Karvountzis, Sean Mullins, Al Yamin, Clancy Bond), except where noted

No.	Title	Writer(s)	Length
1.	"Garbage Bin"	Karvountzis	4:08
2.	"Entitled Generation"	Karvountzis w/ TLH	2:23
3.	"Short Hair"	Karvountzis w/ TLH	3:31
4.	"Team Player"		3:29
5.	"Everyone Is"		4:09
6.	"Nowhere, SA"		4:09
7.	"Idiot Proverbs"	Karvountzis w/ TLH	2:33
8.	"Caroline"	Karvountzis w/ TLH	3:11
9.	"The Void"		4:34
10.	"Drag Me" (LP edition continues until 9:44)	Karvountzis & Mullins w/ TLH	4:44
Total length:			36:51

=== LP Extended Edition ===
No.	Title	Length
10.	"Drag Me"	9:44
Total length:		41:51

== Personnel ==
Credits adapted from album's liner notes.

Tiny Little Houses

- Caleb Karvountzis – vocals, guitar
- Sean Mullins – guitar
- Al Yamin – bass
- Clancy Bond – drums

Production

- Steven Schram – Producer, Audio Engineer and Mixer
- Fergus Miller – Co-Producer on "Garbage Bin"
- Joe Carra – Mastering

Art

- Ella Palij – Cover Photograph
- Clancy Bond – Cover Photograph
- Caleb Karvountzis – Clay Figure
- Lisa Dotorre – Back Cover Painting
- Luke Macmahon – Cover Layout and Text

== Charts ==
Chart (2018)	Peak position
Australian Albums (ARIA)	39
