= The Sound (Australian TV series) =

Australian TV series

- Created by: Michael Gudinski
- Presented by: Jane Gazzo (season one-two), Bridget Hustwaite (season two)
- Opening theme: "The Sound" by D'arcy Spiller
- Country of origin: Australia
- Original language: English
- No. of seasons: 3
- No. of episodes: 20

Production
- Running time: 60 mins (season 1-2), 30 mins (season 3)

Original release
- Network: ABC
- Release: 19 July 2020

The Sound is an Australian music program broadcast on the ABC, which first screened on Sunday 19 July 2020. The program is hosted by Jane Gazzo and Zan Rowe with a special guest co-host each week. It is created and filmed by Mushroom Vision and screens on Sundays at 5.30pm with a replay on Saturdays at 12.30pm. The pre-recorded live performances are also available to watch on ABC iview. The Sound features pre-recorded live performances, music videos of new releases and interviews with artists, highlighting Australia's "best and upcoming talent". The program features a historical segment called "The Vault", which shows an iconic Australian performance, as well as "A Tribute" which pays tribute to "great Australian tracks" where various artists perform collaboratively.

A second series commenced on 1 November 2020.

A third series was announced in October 2021 and premiered on 7 November 2021, at a shorter length of 30 minutes per episode.

== Series overview ==
Series	Episodes	Originally aired		Special(s)
Series	Episodes	First aired	Last aired	Special(s)
1	6	19 July 2020	22 August 2020	No special
2	6	1 November 2020	20 December 2020	2
3	6	7 November 2021	12 December 2021	No special

== Episodes ==
- Performances listed in order they were presented.

=== Season One ===
List of season one episodes
Episode	Air date	Co host
Episode 1	19 July 2020	Bryan Brown
In order of performance: DMA's – "Criminals"; Benee – "Night Garden"; Mark Seymour and the Undertow – "Night Driving"; Jerome Farah – "I Can't Breathe"; Colin Hay, Ali Barter and Oscar Dawson, Hayley Mary, Cameron Bird and Kellie Sutherland (Architecture in Helsinki) – "Live it Up" (Tribute); Eskimo Joe – "Say Something"; Midnight Oil – "US Forces" (From the Vault – 1985); Nick Cave – "The Ship Song"; Lime Cordiale – "Screw Loose"; Kate Ceberano, Steve Kilbey and Sean Sennett – "All Tied Up"
Episode 2	26 July 2020	Russell Crowe
In order of performance: San Cisco – "On the Line"; The Teskey Brothers – "Carry You"; Eves Karydas – "Complicated"; James Reyne – "Low Hanging Fruit"; Adalita, Mahalia Barnes and Polish Club – "Boys in Town" (Tribute); Cub Sport – "Be Your Man"; Julia Stone – "Break"; Kylie Minogue – "What Do I Have to Do" (From the Vault – 1998); Sycco – "Dribble"; Paul Kelly & Paul Grabowsky – If I Could Start Today Again
Episode 3	2 August 2020	Red Symons
In order of performance: Sheppard – "Symphony"; John Butler – "The Weight in the Water"; Scott Darlow featuring Ian Kenny – "You Can't See Black in the Dark"; Gordi – "Unready"; Daryl Braithwaite, Patience (The Grates), Ross Wilson & Laura Davidson – "Livin' in the 70s" (Tribute); Dallas Woods – "If It Glitters It's Gold"; Angie McMahon – "Staying Down Low"; Jimmy Barnes – "No Second Prize" (From the Vault - 1984); Boy & Bear – "Limit of Love"; Amy Shark – "Everybody Rise"
Episode 4	9 August 2020	Myf Warhurst
In order of performance: G Flip – "Hyperfine"; Kian – "Every Hour"; Midnight Oil featuring Dan Sultan, Joel Davidson, Kaleen Briggs and Bunna Lawrie – "Gadigal Land"; Megan Washington – "Batflowers"; D'arcy Spiller – "What in Hell"; Yothu Yindi (and guests) (From the Vault – ARIA Music Awards of 2012 performance); Illy featuring G Flip – "Loose Ends"; Hockey Dad – "I Missed Out"; Kylie Minogue – "Say Something" (video clip); John Paul Young and the All Stars – "Friday on My Mind" (Tribute)
Episode 5	15 August 2020	Deborah Mailman
In order of performance: Shannen James – "Arrows"; Ball Park Music – "Day & Age"; Miiesha with Jeremy Marou – "Twisting Words"; Lastlings – "No Time"; Kate Miller-Heidke – "Deluded"; Hunters and Collectors – "Do You See What I See" (From the Vault – MCG, 2009); Tkay Maidza – "You Sad"; Diesel – "Come Back"; Jessica Mauboy – "Butterfly"; Paul Dempsey, Hatchie, Middle Kids, Steve Kilbey – "Streets of Your Town" (Tribute)
Episode 6	22 August 2020	Keith Urban
In order of performance: D'arcy Spiller – "The Sound"; Cxloe – "12 Steps"; Josh Teskey and Ash Grunwald – "Thinking 'Bout Myself"; Guy Sebastian – "Standing with You"; Vika & Linda – "There Ain't No Grave (Gonna Hold My Body Down)"; Mondo Rock – "Come Said the Boy" (From the Vault – 1984); Tones and I – "Never Seen the Rain"; Bliss n Eso featuring Jack Isaac – "Lighthouse"; Electric Fields featuring Missy Higgins, Jessica Mauboy, John Butler – "From Little Things, Big Things Grow"; Jimmy Barnes, Chris Cheney, Mahalia Barnes, Ben Rodgers, Lachy Doley and Jackie Barnes – "Most People I Know (Think That I'm Crazy)" (Tribute)

=== Season Two ===
List of season two episodes
Episode	Air date	Co-host
Episode 7	1 November 2020	Stan Grant
In order of performance: Ruel — "As Long As You Care"; Midnight Oil featuring Jessica Mauboy & Tasman Keith — "First Nation"; Vera Blue — "Lie to Me"; Richard Clapton featuring Jimmy Barnes — "Deep Water (From the Vault – 1989 tour); Mia Wray — "Work for Me"; The Rubens — "Time of My Life"; Midnight Oil featuring Alice Skye — "Terror Australia"; Kylie Minogue with The House Gospel Choir — "Say Something"; Thirsty Merc, Davey Lane, Alex Lahey & Gretta Ray — "Because I Love You" (Tribute to The Masters Apprentices)
Episode 8	8 November 2020	Christine Anu
In order of performance: Tasman Keith with the Bad Bitch Choir — "No Country"; Archie Roach with Jess Hitchcock — "Summer of My Life"; Ocean Alley — "Up in There"; Briggs featuring Muki — "Good Morning"; Goanna — "Solid Rock" (From the Vault – Melbourne, 1983); Midnight Oil, Dan Sultan and Gurrumul — "Change the Date"; Busby Marou – "Lucky Stars"; Missy Higgins – "When the Machine Starts"; Christine Anu, Zaachariaha Fielding, Ngaiire & Emma Donovan – "My Island Home" (Tribute to Warumpi Band)
Episode 9	15 November 2020	Matt Okine
In order of performance: Middle Kids — "R U 4 Me?"; Odette - "Dwell"; The Avalanches and Leon Bridges – "Interstellar Love"; Merci, Mercy — "Tequila & Lemonade"; Silverchair — "Freak" (From the Vault – Rock in Rio Tour 2001); Sam Fischer — "This City"; Thelma Plum with Luke Peacock — "Homecoming Queen"; DMA's — "Silver"; Youth Group, Clare Bowditch, Bob Evans and Carla Geneve — "Bury Me Deep in Love" (Tribute to The Triffids)
Episode 10	22 November 2020	Jock Zonfrillo
In order of performance: Tia Gostelow — "Psycho"; Ziggy Alberts — "Together"; Julia Jacklin — "To Perth Before the Border Closes"; Jimmy Barnes with Australian Chamber Orchestra — "Killing Time"; Azure Ryder — "Petty Isn't Pretty"; Crowded House" — "It's Only Natural" (From the Vault — ARIA Music Awards of 1992); Casey Barnes — "Bright Lights"; Tones and I with G Flip, The Pierce Brothers, Adrian Eagle, Alice Blake Music and Melbourne Gospel Choir — "Fly Away"; Mark Williams, James Reyne, Sarah McLeod and Mark Seymour — "April Sun in Cuba" (Tribute to Dragon)
Episode 11	29 November 2020	Dylan Lewis
In order of performance: Hayley Mary — "The Chain"; Ziggy Ramo — "Tjitji"; Alison Wonderland — "Bad Things"; Kate Ceberano — "Sweet Inspiration"; Gurrumul — "Bapa" (From the Vault - The Enmore, 2008); Kirsten Salty featuring Taka Perry — "Je ne sais Quoi"; Something for Kate featuring Olympia — "Come Back Before I Come to My Senses"; Birds of Tokyo — "Weekend"; Tim Rogers, Mo'Ju, Waax and Shane Parson — "The Loved One" (Tribute to the Loved Ones and INXS)
Episode 12	6 December 2020	Mick Molloy
In order of performance: Kita Alexander — "Can't Help Myself"; Budjerah — "Missing You"; Courtney Barnett — "Sunday Roast"; A. Swayze & the Ghosts — "Evil Eyes"; Mark Seymour and the Undertow — "Do You See What I See"; Paul Kelly — "Stumbling Block"; Do-Ré-Mi — "Man Overboard" (From the Vault — Rock Arena, 1985); Pendulum — "Nothing for Free"; Tash Sultana — "Mystik"; Marcia Hines, Didirri, Andy Bull, Mia Wray and Russell Morris — "Slippin' Away" (Tribute to Max Merritt)
Episode 13 (Special - Best of series 1 & 2)	13 December 2020	
In order of performance: Midnight Oil featuring Jessica Mauboy & Tasman Keith — "First Nation"; Amy Shark — "Everybody Rise"; Josh Teskey and Ash Grunwald – "Thinking 'Bout Myself"; Guy Sebastian — "Standing with You"; Birds of Tokyo — "Weekend"; Illy featuring G-Flip — "Loose Ends"; Mia Wray — "Work for Me"; Bliss N Eso featuring Jake Isaac — "Lighthouse"; Missy Higgins — "When It All Starts Up Again"; Ruel — "As Long As You Care"; Tones and I with G-Flip, The Pierce Brothers, Adrian Eagle, Alice Blake Music and Melbourne Gospel Choir — "Fly Away"; Sam Fischer — "This City"; Electric Fields featuring Missy Higgins, Jessica Mauboy, John Butler — "From Little Things, Big Things Grow"
Episode 14 (Making Gravy Christmas Special)	20 December 2020	Paul Kelly
In order of performance: Alex Lahey — "Merry Christmas (I Don't Want to Fight Tonight)"; Paul Kelly — "How to Make Gravy" (From 2018 Making Gravy Tour); Dan Sultan and Leah Flanagan — "Old Fitzroy"; Ball Park Music — "Cherub"; Vika and Linda Bull — "Jesus on the Mainline"; Alex the Astronaut — "I Think You're Great"; The Teskey Brothers with Orchestra Victoria — "Dreaming on a Christmas with You"; Baker Boy with Dallas Woods featuring Sampa the Great — "Better Days"; Paul Kelly and Friends (featuring Linda Bull on vocals) — "Christmas (Baby Please Come Home)" (From 2018 Making Gravy Tour)

=== Season Three ===
Season three will feature a rotating roster of guest hosts, replacing previous hosts Jane Gazzo, Zan Rowe and Bridget Hustwaite. The "Tribute" section for season three will be pay respect to living artists.

List of season two episodes
Episode	Air date	Host
Episode 15	7 November 2021	Andy Lee
In order of performance: Vance Joy — "Missing Piece"; Vera Blue — "Temper"; King Stingray — "Milkuwana"; Spacey Jane — "Lunchtime"; Vance Joy — "Riptide"; Charlie Collins, Lisa Mitchell, Kevin Mitchell and Sam Teskey — "Not Pretty Enough" (Tribute to Kasey Chambers)
Episode 16	14 November 2021	Rachael Griffiths
In order of performance: Missy Higgins — "Edge of Something"; Fergus James — "Fall Short"; Alex Lahey — "Spike the Punch"; Isabella Manfredi — "One Hit Wonder"; Missy Higgins — "Futon Couch"; Merci, Mercy and Jack Froggatt — "Somebody That I Used to Know" (Tribute to Gotye and Kimbra)
Episode 17	21 November 2021	Jack Charles
In order of performance: Jessica Mauboy - "Glow"; Thomas Headon - "Nobody Has to Know"; Confidence Man - "Holiday"; Baker Boy - "Meditjin"; Baker Boy featuring Lara Andallo - "Headphones"; Holy Holy and Tia Gostelow and Hayley Mary - "Walking on a Dream" (Tribute to Empire of the Sun)
Episode 18	28 November 2021	Craig Reucassel
In order of performance: Electric Fields - "Gold Energy"; Jack River - "We Are the Youth"; Genesis Owusu - "Waitin' on Ya"; Midnight Oil - "Rising Seas"; Budjerah, Gretta Ray and Ngaiire with Yavusa Choir - "Sweet Disposition" (Tribute to Temper Trap)
Episode 19	5 December 2021	Joel Creasey
In order of performance: Tina Arena - "Church"; Budjerah - "Talk"; WILSN - "You Know Better"; Courtney Barnett - "Here's the Thing"; Tina Arena - "Chains"; San Cisco, Stella Donnelly and Katy Steele - "Good Dancers" (Tribute to Sleepy Jackson)
Episode 20	12 December 2021	Zan Rowe
In order of performance: Gang of Youths - "The Man Himself"; Briggs and Troy Cassar-Daley - "Shadows"; Kye with Touch Sensitive - "Finest Quality; Flowerkid - "Vodka Orange Juice"; Gang of Youths "Magnolia"; Delta Goodrem and Josh Teskey - "Never Tear Us Apart" (Tribute to INXS)
