= Ryland Rose =

- Birth name: Ryan Egan
- Also known as: Ry
- Born: Coburg, Australia
- Origin: Melbourne, Australia
- Genres: Hip hop
- Occupations: Rapper; songwriter
- Years active: 2012–present
- Labels: Independent

Ryan Egan, better known by the stage name Ryland Rose (formerly Ry from 2012 to 2016), is an Australian rapper and songwriter. He is best known for his songs "Almost Famous & Broke", "Gimme That" & "Circles", all which received national airplay on Triple J. His video clip was Indie Clip of the Week on Australia's rage for the "Good Morning" music video. His music was used on Unplanned America, a program on SBS Two.

== Biography ==
Ry's debut EP, Wall Street, was released online for free in August 2012. The first single, "Won't Be Long", debuted on Dom Alessio's Triple J show Home & Hosed, and its music video played on The Loop. The EP's second single, "Ride For Me" (feat. Shadow Kitsuné), again received airplay on Triple J, and was announced as a winner of the National Institute of Dramatic Art and Triple J Unearthed competition where a live action video was filmed for the track by one of NIDA's directing students then aired on ABC Television.

Ry launched Wall Street with a live Melbourne show in April 2013 and was named the 26th most played artist on Triple J Unearthed's Digital Radio Station during 2012 In October 2013, he announced his next EP, Amnesia, with its first single being "The Breakdown". He was named as a Featured Artist for Triple J Unearthed, again receiving airtime on Triple J during several of the station's shows. He supported Spit Syndicate during their Money Over Bullshit Tour. Whilst in the United States in late 2013, Ry filmed the footage that is now seen in the music video for "Good Morning". The video premiered on the Home & Hosed blog, then was the Rage Indie Clip of the Week, airing throughout the month.

Ry signed with Inertia Access for the release of the single "Circles". The song received frequent airtime and national exposure. It was officially remixed by HAWAII94 and Nicholas Basquiat and re-released as a maxi-single. Between projects, Ry released the free mixtape NEVADA, which gave way to his first tour, supporting Mind Over Matter for several shows and then headlining several cities such as Sydney and Melbourne. He teamed with director Luke Goodall to document this period of time in a web series titled Good Things Work Out.

In November 2014, Ry released the single "Lightning In A Bottle". In March 2015, he released the first official single "Gimme That" (feat. Jordan De La Cruz) from the EP Ivory Coast. Its music video featured cameos from producer M-Phazes and actor and musician Alan Fletcher. The song's video was the winner in Channel [V]'s "Disco[v]er" competition, finding itself added to the high rotation on Channel [V], as well as MTV Music Australia and Rage.

On 5 May 2015, Ry released the EP Ivory Coast. It debuted at #16 on Australia's AIR Independent Charts. The lead single, "Gimme That", was also added to the Spotify's official Australian hip-hop playlist.

On 22 June 2016 he officially changed his stage name into Ryland Rose.

After changing his name, he released the free mixtape PEACHES to fans via his Bandcamp site on 25 July 2016

== Discography ==
=== Albums ===
Title	Details
Almost Famous & Broke	Released: 18 May 2017; Label: Ryland Rose
Dork	Released: 13 September 2018; Label: Ryland Rose
Champion of the Losers	Released: 23 October 2020; Label: Ryland Rose

=== Mixed tapes ===
Title	Details
Drive	Released: 14 February 2012 (Bandcamp); Label: Ryland Rose
Nevada	Released: 11 August 2014 (Bandcamp); Label: Ryland Rose
Peaches	Released: 25 July 2016 (Bandcamp); Label: Ryland Rose

=== Extended plays ===
Title	Details
Wall Street	Released: August 2012 (Bandcamp); Label: Ryland Rose
Amnesia	Released: 22 October 2013 (Bandcamp); Label: Ryland Rose
Ivory Coast	Released: 5 May 2015 (Bandcamp); Label: Ryland Rose

== Awards and nominations ==
=== AIR Awards ===
The Australian Independent Record Awards (known colloquially as the AIR Awards) is an annual awards night to recognise, promote and celebrate the success of Australia's Independent Music sector.

Year	Nominee / work	Award	Result	Ref.
2021	Champion of the Losers	Best Independent Hip Hop Album or EP	Nominated	
