= My Friend (Oblivia song) =

Single by Oblivia

from the album The Careless Ones
- Released: May 2000
- Length: 4:10
- Label: Sony BMG
- Songwriter(s): Tony Jukic
- Producer(s): Steve James

Oblivia singles chronology
"My Friend" (2000)	"Mindbomb" (2000)

"My Friend" is a song by Australian pop band Oblivia. It was released in May 2000 as the group's debut single and lead single from their album, The Careless Ones (2001). The song peaked at number 35 on the ARIA charts.

At the ARIA Music Awards of 2000, Steve James won Producer of the Year and Engineer of the Year for "My Friend".

== Track listing ==
1. "My Friend"
2. "1-45"
3. "Mono Ways"
4. "My Friend" (CD_Rom video)

== Charts ==
Chart (2000)	Peak position
Australia (ARIA)	35

== Release history ==
Country	Date	Format	Label	Catalogue
Australia	May 2000	CD Single	Sony BMG	74321709592
