= Eric J =

American record producer and songwriter

Eric J Dubowsky, also known as Eric J, is an American mixer, songwriter and record producer. Dubowsky grew up in the New York City suburb of Tenafly, New Jersey and graduated from Tenafly High School. After attending Syracuse University, he worked at Greene St. Recording in New York City, the home of early hip-hop artists Run-DMC and Public Enemy. It was here Dubowsky assisted engineer/producer Rod Hui which led to a job working with Atlantic Records producer Arif Mardin.

Dubowsky has worked with artists such as Flume, Tame Impala, Justice, Phoenix, Weezer, ODESZA, FKA Twigs, Dua Lipa, Twenty One Pilots, Kylie Minogue, Chet Faker, the Teskey Brothers, Jennie, Brandy, Becky Hill, Bebe Rexha, Train, Jeff Bhasker, Andy Grammer, Tove Lo, St. Vincent, the Chemical Brothers, Alessia Cara, Demi Lovato, Angus & Julia Stone, Freeform Five, Ruel, Kimbra, Mansionair, Panama, Hayden James, Meg Mac, Yuka Honda, Flight Facilities, the Rubens, Marc Kinchen, Lisa Mitchell, Carolina Liar, and actress Emmy Rossum. In 2026 he mixed the score to Grand Theft Auto VI.

Dubowsky received the 2014 ARIA award for Best Engineer for his work mixing the Chet Faker album, Built on Glass. He received the 2016 ARIA award for Best Engineer, alongside Flume, for his work on Skin. He also won a Grammy Award. In 2021, Dubowsky won an APRA award for Most Played Electronic Work for the song "Rushing Back" which he co-wrote with Flume and Vera Blue. He won an Emmy award for his work with Andy Grammer on the song "Don't Give Up On Me".

In one week in June 2012, Dubowsky held the production credits on 7 of the top 10 songs on the ARIA singles chart including the top 5.

He was the lead singer of the New York City–based band Essex, which he formed with Jeff Buckley drummer Matt Johnson. He sang and played guitar and keyboards in the Relationship with Weezer guitarist Brian Bell, and also produced and recorded their self-titled album. Dubowsky worked as an engineer for Weezer on The Red Album produced by Rick Rubin. He composed the theme song to VH-1's Metal Mania and the theme for World Extreme Cagefighting on Versus and later the UFC.

== Awards and nominations ==
=== ARIA Music Awards ===
The ARIA Music Awards is an annual awards ceremony that recognizes excellence, innovation, and achievement across all genres of Australian music.

Year	Nominee / work	Award	Result
2014	Built on Glass by Chet Faker	Engineer of the Year	Won
2016	Skin by Flume	Engineer of the Year	Won
2020	Free Time by Ruel	Engineer of the Year	Nominated
2021	0202 by The Rubens	Engineer of the Year	Nominated
2022	Eric J Dubowsky & Dann Hume for Conversations by Budjerah	Mix Engineer – Best Mixed Album	Nominated
2022	Eric J Dubowsky for Palaces by Flume	Mix Engineer – Best Mixed Album	Nominated
2023	Eric J Dubowsky, Sam Teskey, Wayne Connelly for The Teskey Brothers – The Winding Way	Best Engineered Release	Nominated
2024	Eric J Dubowsky for Angus & Julia Stone – Cape Forestier	Best Engineered Release	Nominated
2025	Eric J Dubowsky for Emma Louise and Flume – Dumb	Best Engineered Release	Nominated

=== MPEG Awards ===
The Music Producer and Engineers’ Guild (MPEG Awards) Awards celebrate excellence in music production and engineering in Australia. They commenced in 2024.

Year	Nominee / work	Award	Result	Ref.
2024	Eric J Dubowsky	Producer of the Year	Won	
