= Oblivia (band) =

Australian rock band

- Origin: Sydney, New South Wales, Australia
- Genre: Rock
- Years active: 1999–2002
- Label: RCA/BMG
- Past members: Peter Banicevic; Tony Jukic; Gordon Burke; Johnny Sans; Owen Thomson; Adam Church

Oblivia were an Australian rock band formed in 1999 by mainstays Peter Banicevic (p.k.a. Pete Banner) on bass guitar and Tony Jukic (p.k.a. Tony Juke) on guitar and synthesisers. They were joined in the following year by Irish-born vocalist, Gordon Bourke (p.k.a. Josh Orange). Their debut single, "My Friend" (May 2000), peaked at No. 35 on the ARIA Singles Chart. At the ARIA Music Awards of 2000, "My Friend" received two trophies for Producer of the Year and Engineer of the Year for the work by Steve James. Oblivia released a sole album, The Careless Ones (July 2001) before disbanding in the following year.

== History ==
Oblivia were an Australian rock band formed in Sydney by Peter Banicevic (p.k.a. Pete Banner) on bass guitar and Tony Jukic (p.k.a. Tony Juke) on guitar and synthesisers in 1999. Banicevic and Jukic were schoolmates from the western suburbs. Irish-born Gordon Burke (p.k.a. Josh Orange) joined on lead vocals in the following year. They were signed to Albert Music by Harry Vanda for a publishing contract, which led to being taken on-board by BMG.

Their debut single "My Friend" was released in May 2000, which peaked at No. 35 on the ARIA Singles Chart. It was produced by Steve James (Sex Pistols, Mental as Anything, Screaming Jets). The single was supported by national youth radio station, Triple J. At the ARIA Music Awards of 2000, "My Friend" received two trophies for Producer of the Year and Engineer of the Year for the work by James. A second single, "Mindbomb", appeared in October 2000. By December of that year the line-up was Banicevic, Bourke, Jukic, Johnny Sans on guitar and Owen Thompson on drums.

Oblivia issued a sole album, The Careless Ones (July 2001), which was also produced by James. At the end of that month, Australian music journalist, Ed Nimmervoll, rated it as his album of the week and described how the group deliver, "power pop with an edge" and they "have a lot to offer; strong melodies, interesting words, powerful performances." One of the album's tracks, "Shiver", was used on the soundtrack for the comedy-drama film, Bootmen (October 2000). By August 2001 both Sans and Thompson had left while Adam Church had joined as their drummer. They released two more singles from the album, "Collapse on Me" and "Stupid" / "Apparition", before disbanding in 2002.

In 2007 Jukic, on guitar, joined the reformed line-up of a hard rock band, the Hitmen, alongside earlier members Johnny Kannis on lead vocals, Chris Masuak on lead guitar and Tony Robertson on bass guitar, as well as Murray Shepherd on drums.

== Discography ==
=== Albums ===
List of studio albums, with selected details
Title	Album details
The Careless Ones	Released: 2 July 2001; Label: Sony BMG (74321787982); Format: CD

=== Singles ===
List of singles, with selected chart positions
Title	Year	Peak chart positions	Album
Title	Year	AUS	Album
"My Friend"	2000	35	The Careless Ones
"Mindbomb"	2000	84	The Careless Ones
"Collapse on Me"	2001	—	The Careless Ones
"Stupid" / "Apparition"	2001	—	The Careless Ones
