= Flotsam Jetsam =

Australian synth pop band

- Origin: Sydney, New South Wales, Australia
- Genres: Synth-pop
- Years active: 1983–1988
- Label: WEA
- Past members: Nick Ferris; Stephen Ferris; Tony Gilbert; Michael Iacano; John Swanston; Ashley Cadell; Peter Ciobo; Warren Mclean; Lee Borkman; Russell Gamble; Anthony Iacano; Ade Akisanya

Flotsam Jetsam were an Australian synth-pop band formed in 1983. Originally formed as a studio band they started performing live to increase their profile.

The group released two singles and one EP which peaked inside the Australian top 100 charts. Their single "Show Me" was engineered by Guy Gray and it earned him a nomination for the 1987 ARIA Music Award for Engineer of the Year.

The band supported A-ha, Queen and Simply Red on Australian tours.

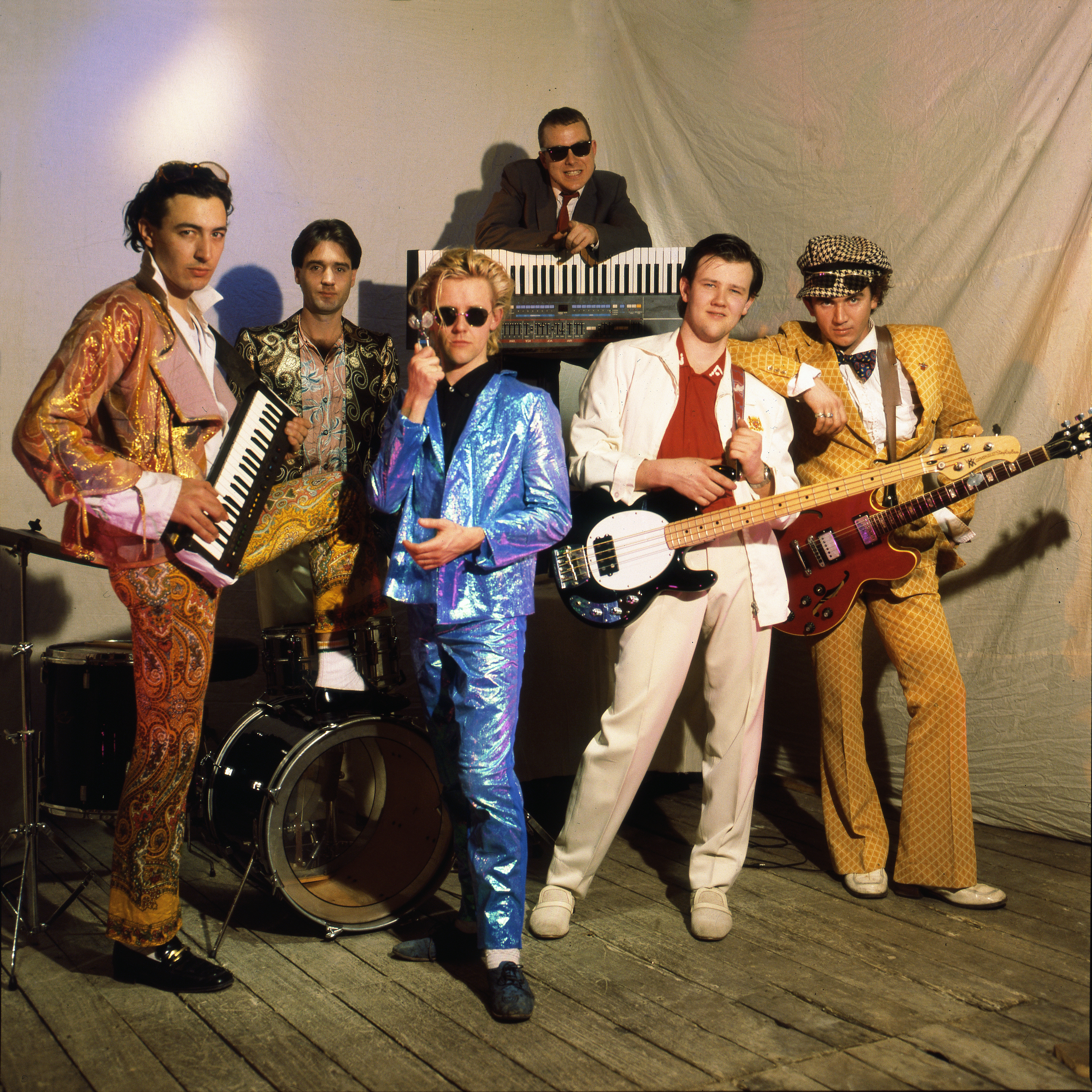
Flotsam Jetsam on the set for the Hijack To Hollywood video shoot in 1986 from left to right: Michael Iacono, John Swanton, Stephen Ferris, Ashley Cadell, Nick Ferris and Tony Gilbert

== History ==
=== First beginnings - 1983 ===
Flotsam Jetsam were formed in 1983 by Stephen Ferris, Tony Gilbert and Anthony Iacono. Nick Ferris joined soon after in the same year. At the time, the band didn't have a drummer so they used a Roland TR-808 drum machine and Korg Polysix keyboards on a four track Tascam reel to reel tape recorder. They performed this way live until drummer Warren Maclean joined. Maclean was previously in a band called Four-Four with Nick Ferris before Flotsam Jetsam. Maclean would leave the band in 1984 but return in 1985.

Over the next year, several musicians joined Flotsam Jetsam including percussionist Bill Kay; keyboardists Ade Akisanya and Peter Pitcher; and three backup singers - Annie Swanton, Emma De Teliga, and Katina Cremona - known as The Shonkettes.

During this time, percussionist John Swanton joined permanently and keyboardist Michael Iacono replaced Akisanta. After Maclean's departure for the Machinations, Flotsam Jetsam decided not to have a drummer. Instead, they performed with a Sequential Circuits Drumtracks drum machine, Roland MSQ 700, and later a Roland MC-500 Micro Composer with John Swanton on percussion.

In 1983 the band recorded at Ramrod Studios Brookvale with drummer and engineer Herman Kovac. They produced the song "115 BPM" for a short video made by director Lucinda Clutterbuck specialising in rotoscope animation. Vocals were performed by Kate Ceberano, of I'm Talking.

=== Cooking With George - 1984 ===
In 1984, the band collaborated with George Wayne, a DJ host at Triple J, on a compilation boxset album titled "Cooking With George". The boxset comprised bands from Sydney, Melbourne and Brisbane to promote emerging young bands. The song "R27s in Godlike Intercession" was selected for the compilation. It was recorded by Keith Walker at ABC recording studios in Darlinghurst.

=== WEA and 100% One Second Love, 1985 ===
In April 1985, shortly before signing with WEA records, Flotsam Jetsam got to play 4 show as the opening act to Queen at the Entertainment Centre in Sydney. On April 30, 1985, Flotsam Jetsam signed a record contract with WEA records, which was then run by Paul Turner and Peter Ikin (and was probably responsible for the band being on the bill with Queen).

Flotsam Jetsam recorded the first single for WEA, a song called "100% One Second Love" under the production of Keith Walker, who had previously worked with the band. This was recorded at EMI 301 studio B, in Castlereagh Street Sydney. A Fairlight CMI systems was used to record their drums and some instruments they also use the services of the jazz pianist Tony Ansell to play on two songs. The B-side is that that record was two songs one was the "Butchers of lust" and the other one was "115 BPM/Crystal Disco".

The single "100% One Second Love" was directed for video by Kimball Rendle. The inspiration for the video was the John Waters film Polyester, with the band performing at a wedding set in a motel and reception at a wedding where things went slightly wrong with some shady characters involved. The video was filmed on 16mm at a motel in Bondi Beach and interiors filmed in the Tiki bar in Oxford Street, Darlinghurst, both locations no longer survive. A number of their friends in the video play wedding guest and features some members of the Ferris family. Virginia Ferris with Philip Hutch dancing and Pee Wee Ferris sitting at the bar and John Ferris in the audience with cameos by Pat Powell, Andy Glitre and many others.

== Members ==
- Stephen Ferris (vocals)
- Nick Ferris (bass, drum programming)
- Tony Gilbert (guitar)
- John Swanton (percussion)
- Michael Iacano (keyboards)
- Ashley Cadell (keyboards)
- Warren Mclean (drums 1984-1986)
- Peter Ciobo (drums 1986-1988)
- Lee Borkman (keyboards 1986-1988)
- Russell Gamble (keyboards 1988)
- Anthony Iacano (guitar, synth)
- Ade Akisanya (synth, bass)

== Discography ==
=== EP ===
List of EPs, with Australian positions
Title	Details	Peak chart positions
Title	Details	AUS
Horrorbox	Released: August 1987; Label: WEA (254887-1); Formats: Cassette, LP	95

=== Singles ===
List of singles, with selected chart positions, showing year released and album name
Year	Title	Peak chart positions	Album
Year	Title	AUS	Album
1985	"100% 1 Second Love"	-	non album singles
1986	"Distraction"	90	non album singles
1986	"Show Me"	-	non album singles
1987	"Power"	76	Horrorbox
