= National Live Music Awards of 2019 =

Annual Australian music awards ceremony

- Date: 4 December 2019
- Venue: The Triffid, Brisbane, Queensland, Australia
- Hosted by: Patience Hodgson, Aimon Clark and Jeremy Neale

Highlights
- Most wins: Electric Fields (3)
- Website: www.nlmas.com.au

The National Live Music Awards of 2019 were the 4th annual National Live Music Awards in Australia.

The nominations were announced on 22 October 2020 and the awards ceremony was held on 4 December 2020. For the first time ever, all State and Territory categories (except the "All Ages Achievement" award) are public voted.

== Live Legend recipient ==
- Deborah Conway

== National awards ==
Nominations and wins below.

Live Act of the Year

Artist	Result
Amyl and the Sniffers	Nominated
Electric Fields	Won
Mojo Juju	Nominated
Psychedelic Porn Crumpets	Nominated
WAAX	Nominated

Live Voice of the Year

Artist	Result
Julia Jacklin	Nominated
Matt Corby	Nominated
Stella Donnelly	Nominated
Thelma Plum	Nominated
Zaachariaha Fielding (Electric Fields)	Won

Best New Act

Artist	Result
Carla Geneve	Nominated
G Flip	Nominated
Press Club	Nominated
The Chats	Nominated
Tones and I	Won

Live Bassist of the Year

Artist	Result
Hayley Manwaring (Moaning Lisa)	Nominated
Jennifer Aslett (San Cisco, Stella Donnelly)	Won
Jonathan Zwartz	Nominated
Rosie Fitzgerald (I Know Leopard)	Nominated
Sara McPherson	Nominated

Live Drummer of the Year

Artist	Result
Dan Williams	Nominated
Jonathan Boulet (Party Dozen)	Nominated
Lauren Hammel (High Tension, Tropical Fuck Storm)	Won
Talya Valenti	Nominated

Live Guitarist of the Year

Artist	Result
Axel Carrington (New Talk, Peppermint Showers)	Nominated
Carla Geneve	Nominated
Erica Dunn (Tropical Fuck Storm)	Won
Stella Donnelly	Nominated
Tommy Emmanuel	Nominated

Live Instrumentalist of the Year

Artist	Result
Bree Tranter (Solo, The Middle East, Timberwolf, Matt Corby and more)	Won
Jay Watson (Tame Impala)	Nominated
Jenny McCullagh (I Know Leopard)	Nominated
Kat Mear (Cash Savage)	Nominated
William Barton	Nominated

Live Blues and Roots Act of the Year

Artist	Result
Little Georgia	Nominated
Steve Smyth	Nominated
Tash Sultana	Nominated
The Cat Empire	Nominated
The Teskey Brothers	Won

Live Classical Act of the Year

Artist	Result
Deborah Cheetham	Won
Ensemble Offspring	Nominated
Genevieve Lacey	Nominated
Pinchgut Opera	Nominated
Plexus	Nominated

Live Country Act of the Year

Artist	Result
Kasey Chambers	Won
The Waifs	Won
The Weeping Willows	Nominated
The Wilds	Nominated
The Wolfe Brothers	Nominated

- Note: This was a tie.

Live Electronic Act (or DJ) of the Year

Artist	Result
Electric Fields	Won
Hermitude	Nominated
KLP	Nominated
Pnau	Nominated
Rüfüs Du Sol	Nominated

Live Hard Rock Act of the Year

Artist	Result
DZ Deathrays	Nominated
Glitoris	Won
Hands Like Houses	Nominated
Northlane	Nominated
The Beautiful Moment	Nominated

Live Hip Hop Act of the Year

Artist	Result
Allday	Nominated
Baker Boy	Nominated
Genesis Owusu	Nominated
Hilltop Hoods	Nominated
Sampa the Great	Won

Live Indie / Rock Act of the Year

Artist	Result
Angie McMahon	Won
Cash Savage and the Last Drinks	Nominated
East Brunswick All Girls Choir	Nominated
Middle Kids	Nominated
WAAX	Nominated

Live Jazz Act of the Year

Artist	Result
Jonathan Zwartz	Nominated
Tamara Murphy	Nominated
Stephen Magnusson	Nominated
The Catholics	Nominated
The Necks	Won

Live Pop Act of the Year

Artist	Result
Amy Shark	Nominated
G Flip	Won
Hatchie	Nominated
Jack River	Nominated
Mallrat	Nominated

Live R&B or Soul Act of the Year

Artist	Result
Caiti Baker	Nominated
Demon Days	Nominated
Jamilla	Nominated
Milan Ring	Nominated
Mojo Juju	Won

Best Live Music Festival or Event

Festival or Event	Result
BigSound	Nominated
Dark Mofo	Won
Groovin' the Moo	Nominated
St Jerome's Laneway Festival	Nominated
Woodford Folk Festival	Nominated

Best Live Music Photographer of the Year

Photographer	Result
Britt Andrews	Nominated
Ian Laidlaw	Nominated
Jacinta Keefe	Nominated
Michelle Grace Hunder	Won
Megan Carew	Nominated

International Live Achievement (Group)

Group	Result
Angus & Julia Stone	Nominated
Gang of Youths	Won
Oh Pep!	Nominated
Rüfüs Du Sol	Nominated
The Teskey Brothers	Nominated

International Live Achievement (Solo)

Group	Result
Hatchie	Nominated
Julia Jacklin	Nominated
Meg Mac	Nominated
Stella Donnelly	Won
Tash Sultana	Nominated

Industry Achievement

Name	Result	Notes
Leanne de Souza	Won	Recognising her work for three years as head of the Association of Artist Managers, and 25+ years as an artist manager – one of the true champions of artists and managers in this country.
Joel Edmondson	Nominated	Recognising his invaluable work for 4 years as head of Q Music.
Scott Hutchinson	Nominated	Celebrating a genuine patron of live music, who through his work with Hutchinson Building, has made the Brisbane live music scene what it is.
Susan Heymann	Nominated	The irreplaceable Managing Director of Chugg Entertainment, responsible for some of the biggest tours in Australia (to say the least).
Women of Music Production (WOMPP)	Nominated	Recognising this Perth based organisation, who are fostering a true spirit of supportive collaboration for female, transgender and non-binary music makers to share, discuss and showcase music production.

== State and Territory awards ==
- Note: Wins only.

ACT Awards – Presented by BMA Magazine
Award	Winner
Live Act of the Year	Teen Jesus and the Jean Teasers
Live Voice of the Year	Genesis Owusu
Live Venue of the Year	Smith's Alternative
Live Event of the Year	Groovin' The Moo
All Ages Achievement	Bec Taylor School of Music

Northern Territory Awards – Presented by Foldback Magazine
Award	Winner
Live Act of the Year	Baker Boy
Live Voice of the Year	Colin Lillie
Live Venue of the Year	Darwin Railway Club
Live Event of the Year	Darwin Festival
All Ages Achievement	NT Music School

NSW Awards – Presented by The Music Network
Award	Winner
Live Act of the Year	Jack River
Live Voice of the Year	Ruel
Live Venue of the Year	Oxford Art Factory
Live Event of the Year	Yours & Owls Festival
All Ages Achievement	Music NSW

Queensland Awards - presented by Brisbane City Council
Award	Winner
Live Act of the Year	Cub Sport
Live Voice of the Year	Thelma Plum
Live Venue of the Year	The Tivoli
Live Event of the Year	Caloundra Music Festival
All Ages Achievement	Brett Wood, Principal of the Music Industry College

South Australian Awards – Presented by Three D Radio
Award	Winner
Live Act of the Year	Teenage Joans
Live Voice of the Year	Bec Stevens
Live Venue of the Year	Lion Arts Factory
Live Event of the Year	A Day of Clarity
All Ages Achievement	Girls Rock! Adelaide

Tasmanian Awards – Presented by Edge Radio
Award	Winner
Live Act of the Year	A. Swayze & the Ghosts
Live Voice of the Year	Claire Anne Taylor
Live Venue of the Year	The Brisbane Hotel
Live Event of the Year	Dark Mofo
All Ages Achievement	Falls Festival, Marion Bay, Tasmania

Victorian Awards – Presented by SYN Media
Award	Winner
Live Act of the Year	Mojo Juju
Live Voice of the Year	Didirri
Live Venue of the Year	The Corner Hotel, Richmond
Live Event of the Year	Falls Festival
All Ages Achievement	Music Victoria

West Australian Awards – Presented by RTR FM
Award	Winner
Live Act of the Year	Jack Davies and the Bush Chooks
Live Voice of the Year	Carla Geneve
Live Venue of the Year	Mojos
Live Event of the Year	WAMFest
All Ages Achievement	Em Burrows
