= Tiny Little Houses =

Australian band

- Origin: Melbourne, Victoria
- Genres: Indie rock; Alternative rock
- Years active: 2014–present
- Labels: Ivy League Records
- Members: Caleb Karvountzis; Sean Mullins; Al Yamin; Clancy Bond

Tiny Little Houses are a lo-fi, Indie rock band from Melbourne, Australia.

== Biography ==
Tiny Little Houses was formed in Melbourne in 2014 and have grown from a SoundCloud collaboration between front man Caleb Karvountzis and guitarist Sean Mullins into an established band with the addition of bassist Al Yamin and drummer Clancy Bond.

The band released the EPs You Tore Out My Heart in 2015 and Snow Globe in 2016.

Tiny Little Houses' debut album Idiot Proverbs was released on 21 January 2018.

Their second album Misericorde was released on 19 November 2021.

== Members ==
- Caleb Karvountzis – Vocals, Guitar
- Sean Mullins – Lead Guitar, Backing Vocals
- Al Yamin – Bass, Backing Vocals
- Clancy Bond – Drums

== Discography ==
=== Studio albums ===
List of studio albums, with release date and selected details
Title	Details	Peak chart positions
Title	Details	AUS
Idiot Proverbs	Released: 12 January 2018; Label: Ivy League Records (IVY392/IVY393); Formats: CD, LP, digital download, streaming	39
Misericorde	Released: 19 November 2021; Label: Ivy League Records; Formats: CD, LP, digital download, streaming	

=== Extended plays ===
List of EPs, with release date and selected details
Title	Details
You Tore Out My Heart	Released: 30 October 2015; Label: Ivy League Records (IVY311); Formats: CD, digital download, streaming
Snow Globe	Released: 7 October 2016; Label: Ivy League Records (IVY311); Formats: CD, digital download, streaming

=== Singles ===
Year	Title	Album
2014	"Every Man Knows His Plague; And You Are Mine"	You Tore Out My Heart
2015	"Easy"	You Tore Out My Heart
2015	"Soon We Won't Exist"	You Tore Out My Heart
2016	"Milo Tin"	Non-album single
2016	"Song Despite Apathy"	Snow Globe
2017	"Medicate Me"	Snow Globe
2017	"Garbage Bin"	Idiot Proverbs
2017	"Entitled Generation"	Idiot Proverbs
2018	"Short Hair"	Idiot Proverbs
2020	"Richard Cory"	Misericorde
2021	"Car Crash"	Misericorde
2021	"Smartest Guy"	Misericorde
2021	"I'm Doing Just The Best That I Can"	Misericorde
2021	"Take A Swing"	Misericorde
2021	"Golden Boy"	Misericorde
2021	"Cold Showers"	Misericorde
2023	"Everyday I wake I find another reason not to"	

=== Music videos ===
Year	Album	Title	Director	Reference
2014	You Tore Out My Heart	"Every Man Knows His Plague; And You Are Mine"	Jordan Bond	
2015	You Tore Out My Heart	"Easy"	Jordan Bond	
2015	You Tore Out My Heart	"Soon We Won't Exist"	Zachary Bradtke	
2016	Non-album single	"Milo Tin"	Daniel Dunn & Clancy Bond	
2016	Snow Globe	"Song Despite Apathy"	Clancy Bond	
2017	Snow Globe	"Medicate Me"	Marie Panguad	
2017	Idiot Proverbs	"Garbage Bin"	Marie Panguad	
2017	Idiot Proverbs	"Entitled Generation"	Marie Panguad	
2018	Idiot Proverbs	"Short Hair"	Marie Panguad	
2021	Misericorde	"Car Crash"	Michael Ridley	
2021	Misericorde	"Smartest Guy"	Michael Ridley	
2021	Misericorde	"Take A Swing"	Dirk Jonker	
2021	Misericorde	"Cold Showers"	Ziggy Cross	
