= The Teskey Brothers =

Australian blues rock band

- The Teskey Brothers performing in 2019

Background information
- Origin: Melbourne, Victoria, Australia
- Genres: Soul; gospel; blues rock
- Years active: 2008–present
- Labels: Glassnote; Ivy League; Mushroom Music Publishing; Downtown Music Publishing
- Members: Josh Teskey; Sam Teskey
- Past members: Brendon Love; Liam Gough; Olaf Scott; Nathaniel Sametz; Charlie Woods
- Website: theteskeybrothers.com

The Teskey Brothers are an Australian blues rock band from Melbourne, named after the two brothers who formed the group in 2008: Josh Teskey (vocals, rhythm guitar) and Sam Teskey (lead guitar). In 2019, they signed with Glassnote Records and Ivy League Records. They have released three albums: Half Mile Harvest (2017), Run Home Slow (2019) and The Winding Way (2023). At the 2019 ARIA Music Awards, The Teskey Brothers were nominated for seven awards. They won three categories for the album Run Home Slow, Best Group, Best Blues and Roots Album and Engineer of the Year (Sam Teskey).

== Career ==
The band was formed in 2008 by two brothers, Josh Teskey (vocals) and Sam Teskey (guitar), along with Brendon Love (bass) and Liam Gough (drums). They started by playing in the streets and at parties, then playing larger venues. They were soon attracting attention from record labels. The band began to experience success in 2017. On 12 January 2017, The Teskey Brothers released their debut album, Half Mile Harvest, which was produced in their home studio. Half Mile Harvest was in the Top 20 of the ARIA charts and eventually became number one on the ARIA Independent Album charts.

In 2018, they signed a deal with Downtown Music Publishing. In 2019, the band signed with Glassnote Records, Ivy League Records, and Mushroom Music Publishing. In July 2019 won the Levi Music Prize; a prize to financially assist Australian and New Zealand acts to achieve their export goals. The band contributed seven songs for the 2019 Palm Beach soundtrack which was released in July 2019. On 2 August 2019, The Teskey Brothers released their second studio album, Run Home Slow which debuted at number 2 on the ARIA Charts. The album won Engineer of the Year for Sam at the ARIA Music Awards of 2019. The album also won the ARIA Award for Best Group and Best Blues and Roots album. In 2022, "Carry You", a song from the album, was certified Gold by ARIA.

In April 2020, the band announced the release of their first live album, Live at the Forum, released on 15 May 2020.

In April 2021, the band released a cover of INXS' "Never Tear Us Apart" in dedication to Michael Gudinski.

In October 2021, the band announced the release of Live at Hamer Hall, an album recorded in December 2020 and set for release in December 2021.

On 28 November 2022, it was announced that bassist Brendon Love and drummer Liam Gough would be departing the band, resulting in the band establishing itself as a duo.

In January 2022, the band released a cover of Archie Roach's "Get Back To The Land" with Emma Donovan.

In early 2023, The Teskey Brothers announced their third studio album, The Winding Way, which was released on 16 June 2023. The album was preceded by the singles "This Will Be Our Year" and "Oceans of Emotions".

== Style ==
Their music is in the style of Wilson Pickett and Otis Redding. The band plays soul music, with jazz and rhythm and blues influence.

== Discography ==
=== Studio albums ===
List of studio albums, with selected details, chart positions and certifications
Title	Details	Peak chart positions					Certifications
Title	Details	AUS	GER	NLD	SWI	UK	Certifications
Half Mile Harvest	Release date: 12 January 2017; Label: Half Mile Harvest (TBLP01), Decca; Formats: CD, LP, digital download	18	—	49	—	—	
Run Home Slow	Release date: 2 August 2019; Label: Ivy League (IVY485); Formats: CD, LP, digital download, streaming	2	74	9	78	77	ARIA: Gold
The Winding Way	Release date: 16 June 2023; Label: Ivy League (IVY909); Formats: CD, LP, digital download, streaming	1	46	6	—	50	

=== Live albums ===
List of live albums, with selected details and chart positions
Title	Details	Peak chart positions
Title	Details	AUS
Live at the Forum	Release date: 15 May 2020; Label: Ivy League (IVY546/547); Format: CD, LP, digital download, streaming	1
Live at Hamer Hall (with Orchestra Victoria)	Released: 3 December 2021; Label: Ivy League (IVY706/707); Format: CD, LP, digital download, streaming	11
Live at The Hammersmith Apollo	Released: 11 July 2025; Label: Mushroom (MUSH019CD); Format: CD, LP, digital download, streaming	— (Note: Live at The Hammersmith Apollo did not enter the ARIA Top 100 Album Chart, but peaked at number 8 on the Australian Artist Chart and at number 6 on the Australian Vinyl Album Chart)

=== Extended plays ===
List of extended plays, with selected details and chart positions
Title	Details	Peak chart positions
Title	Details	AUS
The Teskey Brothers	Release date: 2012; Label: The Teskey Brothers; Format: CD	—
The Circle Session	Scheduled: 11 January 2024; Label: Ivy League (IVY1034); Format: digital, LP (RSD 2024 exclusive)	— (Note: The Circle Session did not enter the ARIA Top 100 Album Chart, but peaked at number 18 on the Australian Artist Chart and at number 14 on the Australian Vinyl Album Chart in the week following Record Store Day 2024.)

=== Singles ===
List of singles, with selected chart positions
Title	Year	Peak chart positions		Album
Title	Year	AUS	US AAA	Album
"Pain and Misery"	2016	—	—	Half Mile Harvest
"Louisa"	2017	—	—	Half Mile Harvest
"Forever You and Me"	2018	—	—	Non-album single
"I Get Up"	2018	— (Note: "I Get Up" did not enter the ARIA Top 100 Singles Chart, but peaked at number 15 on the Australian Independent Label Singles Chart.)	—	Half Mile Harvest
"Right for Me"	2019	—	—	Non-album single
"Hold Me"	2019	— (Note: "Hold Me" did not enter the ARIA Top 100 Singles Chart, but peaked at number 7 on the Australian Independent Label Singles Chart.)	—	Run Home Slow
"Man of the Universe"	2019	—	—	Run Home Slow
"So Caught Up"	2019	— (Note: "So Caught Up" did not enter the ARIA Top 100 Singles Chart, but peaked at number 11 on the Australian Independent Label Singles Chart.)	10	Run Home Slow
"Rain"	2019	—	—	Run Home Slow
"Dreaming of a Christmas with You"	2020	— (Note: "Dreaming of a Christmas with You" did not enter the ARIA Top 100 Singles Chart, but peaked at number 6 on the Australian Independent Label Singles Chart.)	—	Non-album singles
"Highway Home for Christmas"	2020	— (Note: "Highway Home for Christmas" did not enter the ARIA Top 100 Singles Chart, but peaked at number 15 on the Australian Independent Label Singles Chart.)	—	Non-album singles
"Never Tear Us Apart"	2021	— (Note: "Never Tear Us Apart" did not enter the ARIA Top 100 Singles Chart, but peaked at number 5 on the Australian Independent Label Singles Chart.)	—	Non-album singles
"Get Back to the Land" (featuring Emma Donovan)	2022	— (Note: "Get Back to the Land" did not enter the ARIA Top 100 Singles Chart, but peaked at number 18 on the Australian Independent Label Singles Chart.)	—	Non-album singles
"This Will Be Our Year"	2022	—	—	The Winding Way
"Oceans and Emotions"	2023	—	—	The Winding Way
"Take My Heart"	2023	—	—	The Winding Way
"London Bridge"	2023	—	—	The Winding Way
"Remember the Time"	2023	—	—	The Winding Way
"I'm Leaving" (The Circle Session version)	2023	—	—	The Circle Session
"Drown in My Own Tears"	2023	—	—	The Circle Session

=== Other charted and certified songs ===
List of other charted and certified songs, with year released and album name shown
Title	Year	Peak chart positions	Certifications	Album
Title	Year	NZ Hot	Certifications	Album
"Carry You"	2019	28	ARIA: Gold	Run Home Slow
"I'm Leaving"	2023	12		The Winding Way

== Awards and nominations ==
=== AIR Awards ===
The Australian Independent Record Awards (commonly known informally as AIR Awards) is an annual awards night to recognise, promote and celebrate the success of Australia's Independent Music sector.

Year	Nominee / work	Award	Result	Ref.
2018	Half Mile Harvest	Best Independent Blues and Roots Album	Nominated	
2020	Run Home Slow	Independent Album of the Year	Nominated	
2020	Run Home Slow	Best Independent Blues and Roots Album or EP	Nominated	
2021	Live at the Forum	Best Independent Blues and Roots Album or EP	Nominated	
2022	Live at Hamer Hall (with Orchestra Victoria)	Best Independent Blues and Roots Album or EP	Nominated	
2024	The Winding Way	Best Independent Blues and Roots Album or EP	Nominated	
2024	Ivy League Records/Mushroom for The Teskey Brothers The Winding Way	Independent Marketing Team of the Year	Nominated	

=== APRA Awards ===
The APRA Awards are held in Australia and New Zealand by the Australasian Performing Right Association to recognise songwriting skills, sales and airplay performance by its members annually. The Teskey Brothers have been nominated for three awards.

Year	Nominee / work	Award	Result	Ref.
2019	"Forever You and Me"	Song of the Year	Shortlisted	
2020	"I Get Up"	Song of the Year	Nominated	
2020	"I Get Up"	Most Performed Blues & Roots Work of the Year	Nominated	
2020	Themselves	Breakthrough Songwriter of the Year	Nominated	
2021	"Ain't My Problem" (with Ash Grunwald)	Most Performed Blues & Roots Work	Nominated	
2021	"Rain"	Most Performed R&B / Soul Work	Won	
2024	"Take My Heart"	Song of the Year	Shortlisted	
2024	"Oceans of Emotions"	Most Performed R&B / Soul Work	Nominated	
2024	themselves	Songwriter of the Year	Won	

=== ARIA Music Awards ===
The ARIA Music Awards is an annual awards ceremony held by the Australian Recording Industry Association. The Teskey Brothers have been nominated for sixteen awards and have won four.

Year	Nominee / work	Award	Result	Ref.
2019	Run Home Slow	Album of the Year	Nominated	
2019	Run Home Slow	Best Group	Won	
2019	Run Home Slow	Best Blues & Roots Album	Won	
2019	Run Home Slow	Breakthrough Artist	Nominated	
2019	Run Home Slow	Best Independent Release	Nominated	
2019	The Teskey Brothers - Intimate Venue Tour	Best Australian Live Act	Nominated	
2019	Sam Teskey for The Teskey Brothers – Run Home Slow	Engineer of the Year	Won	
2020	Live at the Forum	Best Group	Nominated	
2020	Live at the Forum	Best Blues & Roots Album	Won	
2020	Run Home Slow	Best Australian Live Act	Nominated	
2021	The Teskey Brothers (Headline Shows + Festivals)	Best Australian Live Act	Nominated	
2022	Live At Hamer Hall (with Orchestra Victoria)	Best Blues and Roots Album	Nominated	
2023	The Winding Way	Album of the Year	Nominated	
2023	The Winding Way	Best Group	Nominated	
2023	The Winding Way	Best Blues & Roots Album	Won	
2023	Eric J Dobowsky, Sam Teskey, Wayne Connelly for The Teskey Brothers – The Winding Way	Best Engineered Release	Nominated	
2025	Live at the Hammersmith Apollo	Best Blues & Roots Album	Won	

=== J Awards ===
The J Awards are an annual series of Australian music awards that were established by the Australian Broadcasting Corporation's youth-focused radio station Triple J. They commenced in 2005.

Year	Nominee / work	Award	Result
2019	themselves	Double J Act of the Year	Nominated

=== Music Victoria Awards ===
The Music Victoria Awards, are an annual awards night celebrating Victorian music. They commenced in 2005.

Year	Nominee / work	Award	Result	Ref.
2017	The Teskey Brothers	Best Emerging Act	Won	
2017	The Teskey Brothers	Best Band	Nominated	
2017	Half Mile Harvest	Best Soul, Funk, R'n'B and Gospel Album	Won	
2019	Run Home Slow	Best Album	Won	
2019	Run Home Slow	Best Folk or Roots Album	Nominated	
2019	"So Caught Up"	Best Song	Won	
2019	The Teskey Brothers	Best Band	Won	
2019	The Teskey Brothers	Best Regional/Outer Suburban Act	Won	
2020	The Teskey Brothers	Best Live Act	Nominated	
2020	The Teskey Brothers	Best Regional/Outer Suburban Act	Won	
2020	Live at The Forum	Best Blues and Roots Album	Nominated	
2020	Live at The Forum	Best Soul, Funk, R'n'B and Gospel Album	Nominated	
2021	The Teskey Brothers	Best Regional/Outer Suburban Act	Nominated	
2023	The Teskey Brothers	Best Blues Work	Nominated	

=== National Live Music Awards ===
The National Live Music Awards (NLMAs) commenced in 2016 to recognise contributions to the live music industry in Australia.

Year	Nominee / work	Award	Result	Ref.
2019	The Teskey Brothers	Live Blues and Roots Act of the Year	Won	
2019	The Teskey Brothers	International Live Achievement (Group)	Nominated	
2023	The Teskey Brothers	Best Blues & Roots Act	Won	

=== Rolling Stone Australia Awards ===
The Rolling Stone Australia Awards are awarded annually by the Australian edition of Rolling Stone magazine for outstanding contributions to popular culture in the previous year.

Year	Nominee / work	Award	Result	Ref.
2024	The Winding Way	Best Record	Won	
2024	The Teskey Brothers	Rolling Stone Global Award	Nominated	
