= A. Swayze & the Ghosts =

Australian band

- Origin: Tasmania, Australia
- Years active: 2017–present
- Label: Ivy League Records
- Website: https://www.aswayzeandtheghosts.com

A. Swayze & the Ghosts are an Australian band formed in 2017. They released their debut studio album Paid Salvation in September 2020.

A. Swayze & the Ghosts released their self-titled EP in 2017. Since then, they have appeared at Splendour in the Grass, Falls Festival, and Bigsound. They have also supported Jet, The Vines, Frank Carter & The Rattlesnakes and Total Control.

== Discography ==
=== Studio albums ===
List of albums, with Australian chart positions
Title	Album details	Peak chart positions
Title	Album details	AUS
Paid Salvation	Released: 18 September 2020; Format: CD, LP, DD, streaming; Label: Ivy League (IVY560)	55
Let's Live a Life Better Than This	Released: 25 October 2024; Format: Label:	—

=== Extended plays ===
Title	EP details
A. Swayze & the Ghosts	Released: 23 November 2017; Format: Digital download, streaming; Label: Ivy League Records

=== Singles ===
List of singles
Year	Title	Album
2017	"Smooth Sailing"	A. Swayze & the Ghosts
2018	"Suddenly"	Paid Salvation
2019	"Connect to Consume"	Paid Salvation
2020	"Mess of Me"	Paid Salvation
2020	"Cancer"	Paid Salvation
2020	"Evil Eyes"	Paid Salvation
2024	"Cool Cucumber"	Let’s Live a Life Better Than This
2024	"He is Dead"	Let’s Live a Life Better Than This
2024	"Tell You All the Time"	Let’s Live a Life Better Than This
2025	"Stay Right"	
2026	"Is That a Prayer"	
2026	"Hot Sun"	

== Awards and nominations ==
=== AIR Awards ===
The Australian Independent Record Awards (commonly known informally as AIR Awards) is an annual awards night to recognise, promote and celebrate the success of Australia's Independent Music sector.

Year	Nominee / work	Award	Result	Ref.
2021	Paid Salvation	Best Independent Punk Album or EP	Nominated	

=== ARIA Music Awards ===
The ARIA Music Awards is an annual awards ceremony held by the Australian Recording Industry Association. They commenced in 1987.

Year	Nominee / work	Award	Result	Ref.
2021	Paid Salvation	Best Hard Rock or Heavy Metal Album	Nominated	

=== National Live Music Awards ===
The National Live Music Awards (NLMAs) commenced in 2016 to recognise contributions to the live music industry in Australia.

Year	Nominee / work	Award	Result	Ref.
2018	A. Swayze & the Ghosts	Best New Act	Nominated	
2018	A. Swayze & the Ghosts	Best Live Act of the Year (People's Choice)	Nominated	
2018	A. Swayze & the Ghosts	Tasmanian Live Act of the Year	Won	
2019	A. Swayze & the Ghosts	Tasmanian Live Act of the Year	Won	
2020	A. Swayze & the Ghosts	Tasmanian Live Act of the Year	Nominated	
