= Steve Grace =

- Born: Stephen Noel Grace
- Genres: Christian rock; country rock
- Occupation: Musician
- Instrument: Vocals
- Years active: 1987–present
- Labels: Triune/Word; Heartland; Reunion; Southern Land
- Website: stevegrace.com

Steve Grace is an Australian country rock and gospel singer-songwriter and musician. His 1998 single "Big Dreams" from his album, Children of the Western World (1988), reached No. 1 on the US Billboard Gospel Charts. Children of the Western World was certified gold by Australian Recording Industry Association (ARIA) in 1999 and was the first Christian music album to be released on compact disc in Australia. In 1996 Grace won a Dove Award for International Artist of the Year. In 2009 he performed in Papua New Guinea with Darlene Zschech and Hillsong United for the Joyce Meyer Crusade, which broke the record for the largest outdoor event held in Port Moresby with over 100,000 people in attendance.

== Biography ==
Steve Grace's debut album, Children of the Western World (1988), was recorded at Sing Sing Studios with Beeb Birtles producing for Triune Music/Word Australia. The title track was co-written by Grace with Birtles and Craig Ross. It was the first Christian music album on CD in Australia, and was certified gold in 1999 for shipment of 35000 copies by Australian Recording Industry Association (ARIA).

In January 1998 Grace performed at a concert headlined by United States evangelist, Franklin Graham, at Football Park, Adelaide. In August of that year the correspondent of Victor Harbor Times observed, "[Grace] has built up a network of contacts throughout the country through his tours. Local television and radio stations, newspapers, churches and schools all become involved in his concerts. [His] down-to-earth style of presenting the gospel of Jesus has been extremely effective."

== Discography ==
=== Studio albums ===
"Young Australian Man" 1987 Self release

- Children of the Western World (1988) – Triune Music/Word Australia (SGR 0001) - ARIA: Gold
- Liberty Road (1992) – Heartland Records (HRCAS1107-4)
- Long Road to Glory (1996)
- Follow (2001)
- New Day Coming (2004)
- Better Days Ahead (2007)
- Heritage (2009)
- Heritage II (2011) – World Missions International
- Everytown (2012)
- Nullarbor to Nashville (2016)

=== Live albums ===
- One Night in a Million (1991)
- As Far as It Goes (1997)
- Live in Melbourne (2014)
