= Newcastle Star =

The Newcastle Star is a free weekly newspaper in Newcastle, New South Wales, Australia. It is owned by Newcastle Newspapers, the publisher of the Newcastle Herald. The paper is delivered to 114,000 homes each week.
