= Run Home Slow =

Studio album by the Teskey Brothers
- Released: 2 August 2019
- Studio: Half Mile Harvest
- Length: 45:21
- Label: Half Mile Harvest; Decca; Ivy League; Glassnote
- Producer: Paul Butler

The Teskey Brothers chronology
Half Mile Harvest (2017)	Run Home Slow (2019)	Live at the Forum (2020)

Singles from Run Home Slow
- 1. "Hold Me" Released: 7 May 2019; 2. "Man of the Universe" Released: 6 June 2019; 3. "So Caught Up" Released: 3 July 2019; 4. "Rain" Released: August 2019

Run Home Slow is the second studio album by Australian indie blues rock band the Teskey Brothers. The album was released on 2 August 2019 and peaked at number two on the ARIA Charts.

At the ARIA Music Awards of 2019, the album was nominated for seven awards, winning three; Engineer of the Year, Best Group and Best Blues and Roots Album.

At the Music Victoria Awards 2019, the album was nominated for three awards, winning Best Album.

At the AIR Awards of 2020, the album was nominated for Best Independent Album or EP and Best Independent Blues and Roots Album or EP.

The first season of 180 Grams, a music documentary podcast produced by the Mushroom Group, featured Run Home Slow.

== Critical reception ==
Professional ratings
Review scores
Source	Rating
Culture Fly	4/5 stars
Go London	5/5 stars

Paul Barr from Reading called the album "a great follow up" to their debut saying "Here are new songs with added stylistic variations and instrumental colour but retaining that familiar Teskey Brothers sound" believing producer Paul Butler "has helped push the band to new heights".

Dan Condon from Double J said "All the songs here are solid, there's nothing offensive and there's nothing ground breaking. The Teskeys know where their strengths lie, they know what they like, and they stick to it."

Zoë Radas from Stack Magazine said "Its sweet '60s syncopation, dreamy rock 'n' roll, romantic Van Morrison-esque rhythm and blues, and tender neo-soul compositions elevate the boys' former folk leanings into absolutely gorgeous new territory." adding "It's full of stand-outs".

Josh Hinton from Culture Fly said "Run Home Slow isn't fresh and it isn't hip, but who needs to be those things when you can be timeless?" adding "Class never goes out of style, and on this evidence, the Teskeys have plenty of both to spare."

Harriet Wolstenholme from Go London said "The Melbourne outfit find home in a sound that fuses the laid-back spirit of an Aussie rock band and the soul music of a bygone era. The result is a wide-ranging album destined to soundtrack every hipster romance." concluding with "For a blues album it leaves you feeling far from it".

Zach Edwards from Forte Magazine said "Run Home Slow is a beautiful, well-crafted record full of character, space, simplicity, heart, and soul; The Teskey Brothers once again blurring the boundaries of time and genre in the clearest, most enjoyable way possible."

== Track listing ==
All tracks are written by The Teskey Brothers.

No.	Title	Length
1.	"Let Me Let You Down"	4:13
2.	"Carry You"	4:32
3.	"Man of the Universe"	4:09
4.	"Hold Me"	3:07
5.	"Paint My Heart"	6:00
6.	"Rain"	4:14
7.	"So Caught Up"	3:48
8.	"San Francisco"	4:48
9.	"Sunshine Baby"	2:49
10.	"Sun Come Ease Me In"	2:55
11.	"That Bird"	4:46
Total length:		45:21

== Charts ==
=== Weekly charts ===
Chart (2019)	Peak position
Australian Albums (ARIA)	2
German Albums (Offizielle Top 100)	74
Dutch Albums (Album Top 100)	9
Scottish Albums (OCC)	38
Swiss Albums (Schweizer Hitparade)	78
UK Albums (OCC)	77
UK Americana Albums (OCC)	2
Chart (2023)	Peak position
UK Album Downloads (OCC)	11

=== Year-end charts ===
Chart (2019)	Position
Australian Albums (ARIA)	50

== Certifications ==
Region	Certification	Certified units/sales
Australia (ARIA)	Gold	35,000^{‡}
^{‡} Sales+streaming figures based on certification alone.

== Release history ==
Region	Date	Format(s)	Label	Catalogue
Australia	2 August 2019	CD; digital download; streaming; vinyl	Half Mile Harvest Recordings, Ivy League	IVY485
Europe	2 August 2019	CD; digital download; streaming; vinyl	Decca	7782283 / 7782301
