= C. L. Blast =

American soul singer (1934–2016)

C.L. Blast
- Also known as: Little Junior Lewis; Junior Lewis
- Born: Clarence Junior Lewis; August 20, 1934; Birmingham, Alabama, U.S.
- Died: February 26, 2016 (aged 81) Birmingham, Alabama, U.S.
- Genres: Soul
- Occupation: Singer
- Instrument: Vocals
- Years active: 1960–2016
- Labels: Atlantic, United

Clarence Junior Lewis (August 20, 1934 – February 26, 2016), better known by his stage name C.L. Blast, was an American soul singer.

Lewis was born in Birmingham, Alabama in 1934. His first record was "Your Heart Must Be Made of Stone" recorded for Bobby Robinson's Red Robin records in New York in 1955. In 1957, he was drafted into the Army. He entertained troops for two years touring military bases.

After his Army stint, he recorded "Cupid's Little Helper" with Robinson's Fury Records in 1960.

In 1960 he recorded two singles as "Little Junior Lewis". From 1961 to 1963, as "Junior Lewis", he recorded another four singles. From 1967, he started recording as C.L. Blast. He released "I'll Take The Case" (B-side "If I Could See My Baby's Face Again") on Atlantic Records in 1969. His first successful single as C.L. Blast was "What Can I Do (When My Thrill Is Gone)", released on the New York City-based United Records label (1971).

C.L. Blast died on February 26, 2016, at age 81.
