= Half Mile Harvest =

Studio album by The Teskey Brothers
- Released: 12 January 2017
- Studio: Half Mile Harvest Studios
- Length: 50:11
- Labels: Half Mile Harvest Recordings, Decca, Ivy League
- Producers: Brendon Love, Sam Teskey

The Teskey Brothers chronology
The Teskey Brothers (2012)	Half Mile Harvest (2017)	Run Home Slow (2019)

Singles from Half Mile Harvest
- 1. "Pain and Misery" Released: 2016; 2. "Louisa" Released: 7 October 2017; 3. "I Get Up" Released: 4 October 2018

Half Mile Harvest is the debut studio album by Australian indie blues rock band The Teskey Brothers. The album was released on 12 January 2017 and peaked at number 18 on the ARIA Charts. A deluxe edition was released in October 2018, replacing the two cover songs on the standard track listing with two new original songs.

== Background and release ==
Josh and Sam Teskey grew up in Warrandyte and met Brendon Love and Liam Gough and formed the Teskey Brothers in 2008. The Teskey Brothers have been performing around Melbourne since then. The album was recorded in Sam's studio space. In January 2017, the album was launched with a sold out Gasometer Hotel in Collingwood, which had a 150 capacity. Three months later, the group had sold out the 300-capacity Northcote Social Club and in May month they played four nights at the 800-capacity Corner Hotel in Richmond. In June 2017, the band played outside of Victoria for the first time.

== Critical reception ==
Craig Mathieson from Sydney Morning Herald said "Josh's voice, a husky blue-eyed soul instrument that draws stinging regret out of the playing of his guitarist brother Sam, bassist Brendon Love, and drummer Liam Gough, is one element that has contributed to the band's sudden rise." adding "There's the influence of Fleetwood Mac's original avatar Peter Green on Sam's guitar playing, but the band often reveals a revivalist's dedication. The reckoning with heartbreak and swelling horn parts summon a bygone era."

== Track listing ==
All tracks are written by The Teskey Brothers, unless otherwise noted.

Standard edition
No.	Title	Length
1.	"Crying Shame"	3:51
2.	"I Love a Woman" (Billy Myles)	4:44
3.	"Pain and Misery"	4:00
4.	"Shiny Moon"	4:20
5.	"Reason Why"	4:53
6.	"Louisa"	3:03
7.	"Love Her with a Feeling" (Tampa Red)	4:16
8.	"Til' the Sky Turns Black"	5:05
9.	"Hard Feeling"	4:17
10.	"Honeymoon"	11:42
Total length:		50:11

Deluxe edition
No.	Title	Length
1.	"Crying Shame"	3:51
2.	"Say You'll Do"	4:50
3.	"Pain and Misery"	4:00
4.	"Shiny Moon"	4:20
5.	"Reason Why"	4:53
6.	"I Get Up"	4:23
7.	"Louisa"	3:03
8.	"Til' the Sky Turns Black"	5:05
9.	"Hard Feeling"	4:17
10.	"Honeymoon"	11:41
Total length:		50:14

== Charts ==
Chart (2017–19)	Peak position
Australian Albums (ARIA)	18
Dutch Albums (Album Top 100)	49

== Release history ==
Region	Date	Format(s)	Label	Catalogue	Version
Australia	12 January 2017	CD; digital download; vinyl	Half Mile Harvest Recordings	GLS-0241-02 / TBLP01	Standard
Europe	26 October 2018	CD; digital download	Decca	6798408	International
Australia	26 October 2018	CD; digital download; vinyl; streaming	Ivy League	IVY447	Deluxe
