= Ivy League Records =

Australian record label

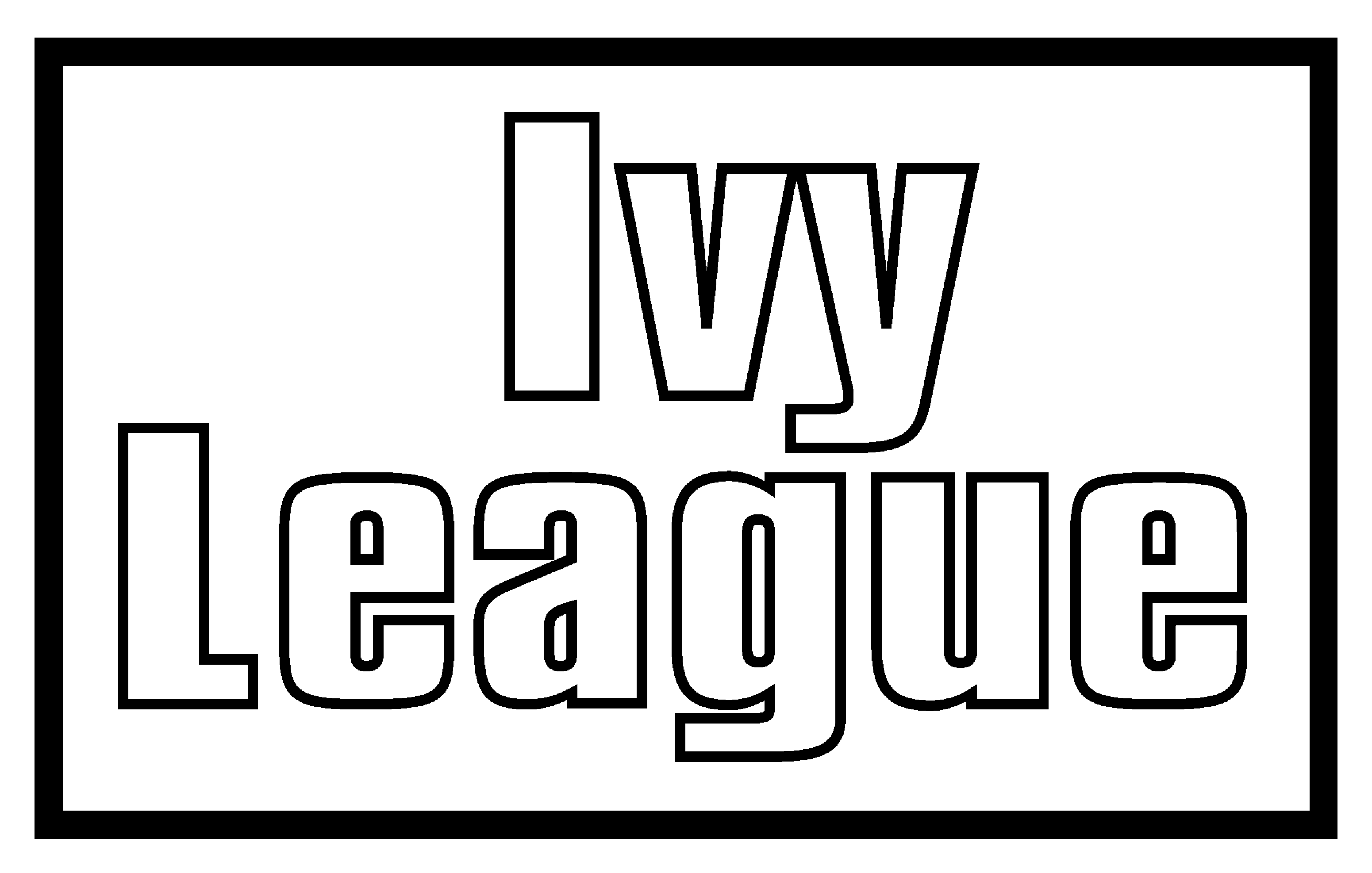
- Founded: 1997
- Founder: Pete Lusty; Andy Cassell; Andy Kelly
- Defunct: 2024
- Status: Defunct
- Distributor: Universal Music Australia / Mushroom Group
- Genre: Various
- Country of origin: Australia
- Location: Sydney
- Official website: www.ivyleague.com.au

Ivy League Records was an Australian record label based in Sydney. It was founded in 1997 by Pete Lusty, Andy Cassell and Andy Kelly. In 2024, the label was merged into Mushroom Music.

In the past, the label released music from the likes of The Vines, Red Riders, Bridezilla, Wild Billy Childish and the Buff Medways, The Silents, 78 Saab, The City Lights, The Whigs, Snob Scrilla and Neon and The John Reed Club. Ivy League is distributed by Universal Music Australia.

Ivy League albums have won the Australian Music Prize (AMP Award) twice via The Mess Hall and Cloud Control. The label has achieved gold/platinum albums via The Rubens, Josh Pyke and Lanie Lane. Other artists on the label include Alpine, Hatchie, The Teskey Brothers, Rolling Blackouts Coastal Fever, Tiny Little Houses, Bad Dreems, Sparkadia, Youth Group, 78 Saab, The City Lights, The Vines, and Hoolahan.

== History ==
Ivy League Records was established in 1997 by three musician friends: Pete Lusty (John Reed Club), Andy Cassell (Youth Group) and Andy Kelly (Glide), who also founded Winterman & Goldstein Management.

Ivy League experienced its first significant success with the Sydney band, Youth Group. Ivy League subsequently reached prominence through the label with Josh Pyke and Cloud Control; management success was experienced with The Vines, Jet and The Sleepy Jackson.

In March 2006, Michael Gudinski of the Mushroom Group purchased a 50% stake in Ivy League.

As part of a restructure of the Mushroom Group in July 2024, Ivy League Records and other labels were consolidated into a new division called Mushroom Music.

== Artists ==
- 78 Saab
- A. Swayze & the Ghosts
- Alpine
- Bad Dreems
- Bridezilla
- Cabins
- Catcall
- Cloud Control
- Deep Sea Arcade
- Hatchie
- Hoolahan
- John Reed Club
- Lanie Lane
- Neon
- Red Riders
- Rolling Blackouts Coastal Fever
- Snob Scrilla
- Sparkadia
- The City Lights
- The Mess Hall
- The Rubens
- The Silents
- The Teskey Brothers
- The Vines
- Tiny Little Houses
- Wilsn
- Wons Phreely
- Youth Group

== Awards and nominations ==
=== AIR Awards ===
The Australian Independent Record Awards (commonly known informally as AIR Awards) is an annual awards night to recognise, promote and celebrate the success of Australia's Independent Music sector.

Year	Nominee / work	Award	Result	Ref.
2022	Ivy League Records	Independent Label of the Year	Nominated	
2024	Ivy League Records	Independent Marketing Team of the Year	Nominated	

== See also ==
- List of record labels
