= DMA's discography =

Discography of Australian rock band DMA's

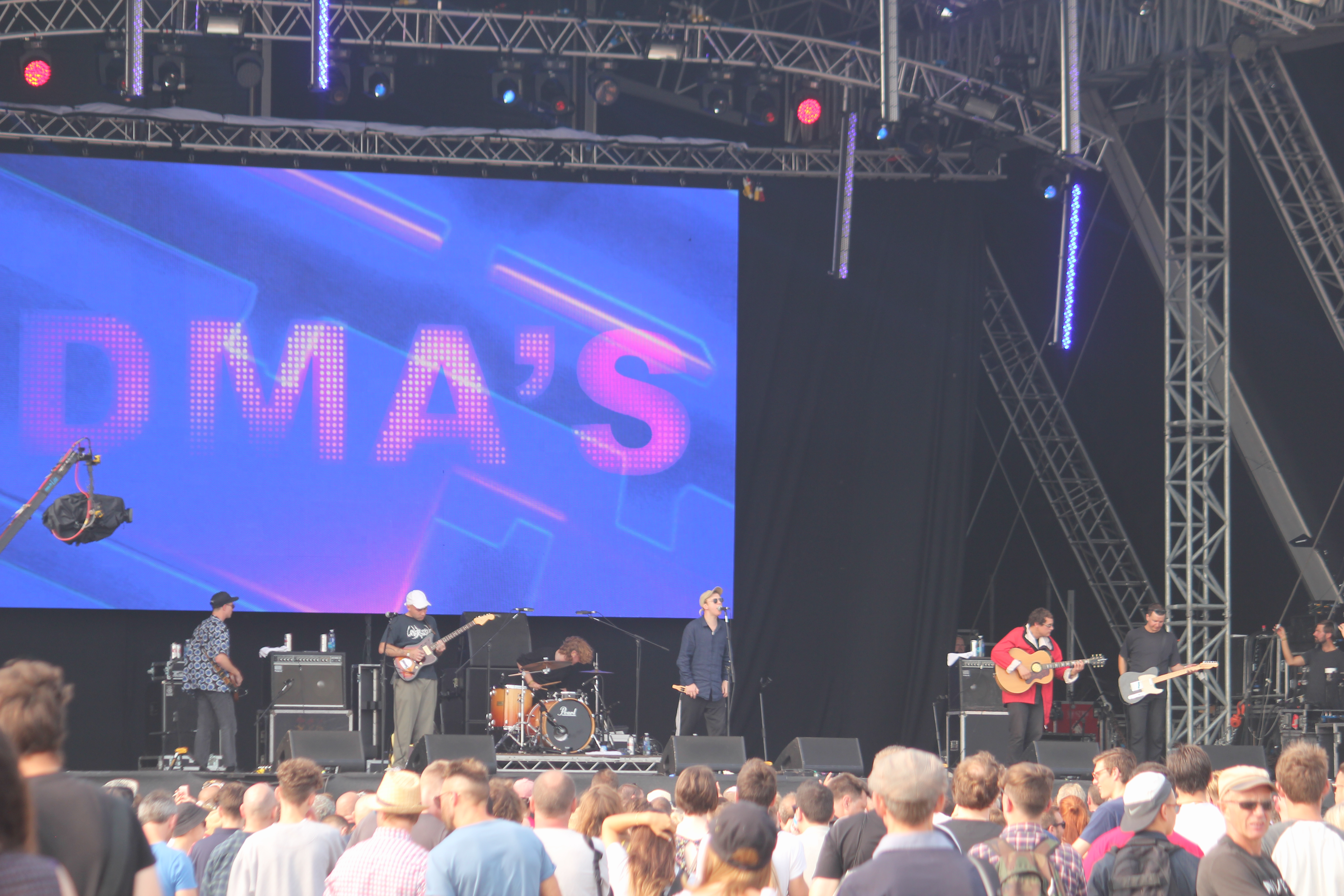
- DMA's in 2016
- Studio albums: 5
- EPs: 2
- Live albums: 2
- Singles: 45

The discography of DMA's, an Australian rock band formed in 2012 consists of five studio albums, two live albums, two extended plays and 45 singles (including two as a featured artist).

The group have been nominated for many awards, including Australian Independent Record Awards, ARIA Music Awards, National Live Music Awards and Rolling Stone Australia Awards winning all of these at least once.

== Albums ==
=== Studio albums ===
List of studio albums, with release date, label, and selected chart positions shown
Title	Details	Peak chart positions				Certifications
Title	Details	AUS	NLD	SCO	UK	Certifications
Hills End	Released: 26 February 2016; Label: I Oh You; Formats: CD, LP, digital download, streaming	8	75	14	36	BPI: Silver
For Now	Released: 27 April 2018; Label: I Oh You; Formats: CD, LP, cassette, digital download, streaming	7	—	5	13	
The Glow	Released: 10 July 2020; Label: I Oh You; Formats: CD, LP, cassette, digital download, streaming	2	—	1	4	
How Many Dreams?	Released: 31 March 2023; Label: I Oh You; Formats: CD, LP, cassette, digital download, streaming	2	—	2	3	
DMA's	Released: 21 August 2026; Label: Wonderlick, Sony; Formats: CD, LP, cassette, digital download, streaming	1	—	3	9	
"—" denotes items which were not released in that country or failed to chart.

=== Live albums ===
List of live albums, with release date, label, and selected chart positions shown
Title	Details	Peak chart positions		
Title	Details	AUS	SCO	UK
MTV Unplugged: Live	Released: 12 July 2019; Label: I Oh You; Formats: CD, LP, digital download, streaming	94	17	65
Live at Brixton	Released: 5 March 2021; Label: I Oh You; Formats: CD, 2xLP, digital download, streaming	39	4	17

== Extended plays ==
List of extended plays, with release date and label shown
Title	Details	Peak chart positions
Title	Details	UK vinyl
DMA's	Released: 28 March 2014; Label: I Oh You; Formats: CD, digital download, streaming	—N/a
I Love You Unconditionally, Sure Am Going to Miss You	Released: 20 August 2021; Label: I Oh You; Formats: digital download, streaming, LP	1 (Note: Listed as 1 Way on the Official Charts Company, which was track 1 on the EP)

== Singles ==
=== As lead artists ===
List of singles as lead artists, with selected peak chart positions and certifications shown
Title	Year	Peak chart positions			Certifications	Album
Title	Year	AUS	SCO	UK	Certifications	Album
"Delete"	2014	84	—	— (Note: "Delete" did not enter the UK top 100, but peaked at number 15 on the Independent Singles Breakers Chart.)	ARIA: 2× Platinum	DMA's
"Feels Like 37"	2014	117	—	—		DMA's
"So We Know"	2014	—	—	—		Non-album singles
"Laced"	2014	—	—	—		Non-album singles
"Your Low"	2015	—	—	—		DMA's
"Lay Down"	2015	—	—	—	ARIA: Gold	Hills End
"Too Soon"	2016	—	—	—		Hills End
"In the Moment"	2016	—	—	—		Hills End
"Timeless"	2016	—	—	—		Hills End
"Step Up the Morphine"	2016	—	—	—	ARIA: Platinum	Hills End
"Believe" (Triple J Like a Version)	2017	—	—	—	ARIA: 2× Platinum	Non-album single (Note: Later included on the 2025 compilation Triple J's Best Australian Like A Version)
"Dawning"	2017	—	—	—		For Now
"In the Air"	2018	—	—	—	ARIA: Gold	For Now
"For Now"	2018	—	—	—		For Now
"Break Me"	2018	—	—	—		For Now
"Do I Need You Now"	2018	—	—	—		For Now
"The End" (original or Channel Tres remix)	2018	—	—	—		For Now
"Time & Money"	2018	—	—	—		For Now
"Silver"	2019	197	—	— (Note: "Silver" did not enter the UK top 100, but peaked at number 1 on the Vinyl Singles Chart.)	ARIA: Gold	The Glow
"Life Is a Game of Changing" (original or Willaris. K remix)	2020	—	99	—		The Glow
"The Glow"	2020	—	—	—		The Glow
"Learning Alive"	2020	—	—	—		The Glow
"Criminals" (original or The Avalanches remix)	2020	—	—	—		The Glow
"Round & Around"	2020	—	—	—		The Glow
"Cobracaine" (original or Jacques Lu Cont remix)	2020	—	—	—		The Glow
"Lay Down" (Live from O2 Academy Brixton)	2021	—	—	—		Live at Brixton
"We Are Midnight"	2021	—	—	—		I Love You Unconditionally, Sure Am Going to Miss You
"Junk Truck Head Fuck" (solo or with May-a)	2021	—	—	—		I Love You Unconditionally, Sure Am Going to Miss You
"I Don't Need to Hide"	2022	—	—	—		How Many Dreams?
"Everybody's Saying Thursday's the Weekend"	2022	—	—	—		How Many Dreams?
"Olympia"	2022	—	—	—		How Many Dreams?
"Fading Like a Picture"	2023	—	—	—		How Many Dreams?
"Something We Are Overcoming"	2023	—	—	—		How Many Dreams?
"Forever"	2023	—	—	—		How Many Dreams?
"What a Life" (with Ruel)	2024	—	—	—		Non-album singles
"We're a Pair of Diamonds" (with Ruel)	2024	—	—	—		Non-album singles
"The Beginning of the End" (with Courteeners)	2024	—	—	—		Pink Cactus Café
"My Baby's Place"	2026	—	—	—		DMA's
"Heatin Park"	2026	—	—	—		DMA's
"Hurracane"	2026	—	—	—		DMA's
"Killing Time"	2026	—	—	—		DMA's
"Windows"	2026	—	—	—		DMA's
"Best Days"	2026	—	—	—		DMA's (Deluxe)
"—" denotes items which were not released in that country or failed to chart.

=== As featured artists ===
List of singles as featured artists, with year released and album shown
Title	Year	Album
"Are You Here?" (The Presets featuring DMA's)	2018	Hi Viz
"The Change" (What So Not featuring DMA's)	2021	Anomaly
"A Thousand Lies" (Heartstring with DMA's and Saidah)	2026	Sentimental Ultra

== Other certified songs ==
List of other certified songs, with year released and album shown
Title	Year	Certifications	Album
"Tape Deck Sick"	2018	ARIA: Gold	For Now

== Music videos ==
Year	Album	Title	Director	Reference
2014	DMA's	"Delete"		
2014	DMA's	"Feels Like 37"	Mitchell Grant	
2014	DMA's	"The Plan"	Gabrielle Dadgostar	
2014	Non-album single	"Laced"	Gabrielle Dadgostar	
2015	Non-album single	"Laced"	Julian Rivoire	
2015	DMA's	"Your Low"	Chad VanGaalen	
2015	Hills End	"Lay Down"	Tristan Jalleh	
2016	Hills End	"Delete"	Mitchell Grant	
2016	Hills End	"Too Soon"	Mitchell Grant	
2016	Hills End	"In the Moment"	Uncle Friendly	
2016	Hills End	"Timeless"	Errol Rainey	
2016	Hills End	"Step Up the Morphine"	Errol Rainey	
2016	Hills End	"Play It Out"	Mitchell Grant	
2017	For Now	"Dawning"	Spike Vincent	
2018	For Now	"In The Air"	Errol Rainey	
2018	For Now	"Do I Need You Now?"	Jake Jelicich	
2018	For Now	"The End"	W.A.M. Bleakley	
2019	The Glow	"Silver"	Charlotte Evans	
2020	The Glow	"Life Is a Game of Changing"	Bill Bleakley	
2020	The Glow	"The Glow"	Errol Rainey and Toto Vivian	
2020	The Glow	"Learning Alive"	Rik Saunders	
2020	The Glow	"Criminals"	Suzanne Kim	
2020	The Glow	"Round & Around"	Steve Lattuca	
2021	Live from Brixton	"Lay Down" (Live from O2 Academy Brixton)		
2021	The Glow	"Appointment"	Patrick Santamaria and Eva Li	
2021	I Love You Unconditionally, Sure Am Going to Miss You	"We Are Midnight"		
2021	I Love You Unconditionally, Sure Am Going to Miss You	"Junk Truck Head Fuck"	Lucy Knox	
2022	How Many Dreams?	"I Don't Need To Hide"	Lucy Knox	
2022	How Many Dreams?	"Everybody's Saying Thursday's the Weekend"	Joel Burrows	
2022	How Many Dreams?	"Olympia"	Kyle Caulfield	
2023	How Many Dreams?	"Fading Like a Picture"	Harry Welsh	
2023	How Many Dreams?	"Something We Are Overcoming"		
2023	How Many Dreams?	"Forever"		
2026	DMA's	"My Baby's Place"		
2026	DMA's	"Heatin Park"		
