= Live at Brixton (DMA's album) =

2021 live album by DMA's

Live album by DMA's
- Released: 5 March 2021
- Recorded: March 2020
- Studio: Brixton Academy
- Label: I OH YOU

DMA's chronology
The Glow (2020)	Live at Brixton (2021)	I Love You Unconditionally, Sure Am Going to Miss You (2021)

Singles from Live at Brixton
- 1. "Lay Down" Released: 15 January 2021

Live at Brixton is the second live album by Australian indie rock band DMA's. The album was announced in January 2021 with a release date of 5 March 2021, arriving on the one-year anniversary of the sold out namesake concert.

Upon announcement, the band told Triple J "We've got a lot of messages from people saying that was the last time they went out before it got a bit weird" and while the band has hosted online screenings of the performance throughout 2020, they gave into fan demand and gave the show an official release.

== Track listing ==
Adapted from Apple Music.

Live at Brixton track listing
No.	Title	Length
1.	"Feels Like 37"	4:30
2.	"Dawning"	3:10
3.	"Too Soon"	3:37
4.	"Hello Girlfriend"	4:18
5.	"Silver"	4:36
6.	"Time & Money"	5:12
7.	"The Glow"	3:02
8.	"The End"	5:02
9.	"Step Up the Morphine"	3:14
10.	"Delete"	4:43
11.	"Life Is a Game of Changing"	4:45
12.	"In the Air"	5:14
13.	"Tape Deck Sick"	4:36
14.	"Play it Out"	6:20
15.	"Timeless"	4:12
16.	"Lay Down"	5:50
17.	"Your Low"	4:54
Total length:		77:15

== Personnel ==
DMA's

- Thomas O'Dell – vocals
- Matthew Mason – guitar, vocals
- Johnny Took – acoustic guitar

== Charts ==
Chart performance for Live at Brixton
Chart (2021)	Peak position
Australian Albums (ARIA)	39
UK Albums (OCC)	17
