= Boy Pablo =

Norwegian band

boy pablo
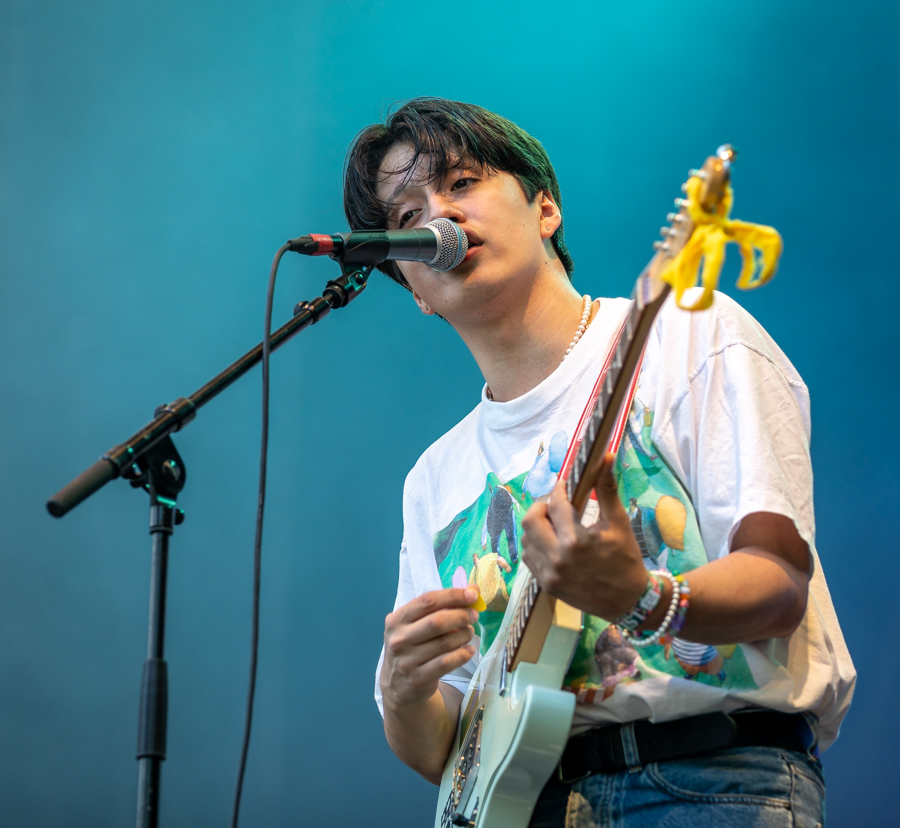
- Muñóz performing in 2019

Background information
- Born: Nicolás Pablo Rivera Muñoz; 29 November 1998 (age 27); Bergen, Norway
- Genres: Indie rock; indie pop; jangle pop
- Years active: 2015–2022
- Label: 777 Music
- Members: Nicolas Munoz

Boy Pablo (stylized as boy pablo) (born 29 November 1998) is the indie pop music project of Norwegian singer songwriter Nicolas Muñoz. Muñoz writes, records, performs, and produces all of the project's music. The project has been inactive since 2022. Boy Pablo's latest touring lineup consisted of Nicolás Muñoz (guitar, vocals), Gabriel Muñoz (lead guitar), Judah Kubendran (bass guitar) and Esteban Muñoz (drums).

Boy Pablo gained attention in late 2017 after the music video for the song "Everytime" gained international popularity on YouTube. The duology concept EPs Roy Pablo (2017) and Soy Pablo (2018) were released under Boy Pablo's own independent label 777 Music. His debut studio album, Wachito Rico was released in October 2020. Out of nominations for five Spellemann Awards, Boy Pablo has won one, and has additionally been nominated for three GAFFA Awards and one P3 Gull award, having won the latter.

== Early life ==
Nicolás Pablo Rivera Muñoz (born 29 November 1998) was born and raised in Bergen after his Chilean parents immigrated to Norway in the 1980s. Born into a musical family as the youngest child, his father and brother were both multi-instrumentalists and helped teach him how to play guitar, drums, bass guitar and piano. He attended secondary school at Kongshaug Upper Secondary School of Music, a music boarding school in nearby Os. He and his parents moved to Os Municipality when he started secondary school, two years prior to January 2017.

== History ==
=== 2015–2016: Career beginnings ===
Muñoz began the "Boy Pablo" project in December 2015, and released his debut single "Flowers" in January 2016. He played his first-ever gig as a warm-up band for Tellef Raabe (brother of Norwegian singer Sigrid) at Hulen in April 2016. In September 2016, he performed as part of the Vill Vill Vest festival in Bergen. Boy Pablo gained immense national popularity after receiving a Bergenfest scholarship of 35 thousand kroner in November 2016. Alongside this scholarship, he additionally won his own headlining gig as well as a performance at the 2017 Bergenfest.

=== 2017–2019: Roy Pablo and Soy Pablo ===
Muñoz further gained international popularity in 2017 with the song and music video for "Everytime", originally uploaded to YouTube in May 2017. Within a few weeks, the video had received millions of views, with Muñoz significantly expanding his fanbase. Boy Pablo released the 6-song EP, Roy Pablo, in May 2017, which includes "Everytime". In August 2017, Boy Pablo opened as a supporting act for American band Beach Fossils at Red Bull Sound Select in Oslo.

Boy Pablo released the single "Losing You" in March 2018, and embarked on a sold out thirty-nine date headlining world tour of United States, Europe and Asia. On 5 October 2018 Boy Pablo released his second EP, Soy Pablo. The EP received critical acclaim and was successful commercially in Norway, topping the national Vinyl albums chart. The EP additionally landed in the top 10 of year-end critics lists from Gaffa and Nöjesguiden, placing at Nos. 9 and 4 respectively. At the 2018 Spellemannprisen (also referred to as Norwegian Grammy Awards), Boy Pablo was awarded with the award for Breakthrough of the Year which additionally gave him the Gramo scholarship of 250.000 kroner. At the same ceremony he was nominated in the categories of Best International Success, and Indie/Alternative of the Year for Soy Pablo. At the 2018 P3 Gull Awards, Boy Pablo also won Årets Nykommer. In January 2019, Boy Pablo was the only Norwegian artist to perform at the Coachella Valley Music and Arts Festival in California, U.S. in that year. At the 2019 Spellemannprisen (also referred to as Norwegian Grammy Awards), Boy Pablo was nominated for Best International Success for the second consecutive year in addition to Årets Musikkvideo ("Losing You").

=== 2020: Wachito Rico ===
In May 2020, Boy Pablo announced the release of his debut studio album, Wachito Rico; the title is a Chilean expression and means "handsome boy." The album's singles are "Hey Girl", "Honey" and "Rest Up". With the release of the latter single, Boy Pablo announced his second-ever headlining world tour to support Wachito Rico, which kicked off in the UK in March 2021.

In the second half of 2022, after completing a tour in Latin America and shortly after releasing his latest single, "Be Mine", Boy Pablo announced the cancelation of his upcoming tours in North America and Asia, citing health problems and lack of energy. Boy Pablo has remained inactive in music since then.

== Live band ==
Current live band

- Nicolas Pablo Rivera Muñoz – rhythm guitar, vocals
- Gabriel Muñoz – lead guitar
- Esteban Muñoz – drums
- Judah Kubendran – bass

Former live band

- Eric Tryland – keyboard, backing vocals
- Henrik Åmdal – bass guitar
- Sigmund Vestrheim – drums
- Amund Valde - keyboard

== Artistry ==
Muñoz cites Mac DeMarco, Veronica Maggio, Tyler, the Creator, the Beatles, Arctic Monkeys, Tame Impala and Mild High Club as musical influences. His rise to fame with a DIY-produced bedroom pop track,"Everytime" (2017), which gained popularity through the YouTube algorithm has drawn comparisons to that of American singer Clairo's rise to fame with her video for "Pretty Girl" (2017).

== Discography ==
=== Studio albums ===
Title	Details
Wachito Rico	Released: 23 October 2020; Label: 777 Music; Format: CD, LP, digital download, streaming, cassette

=== Extended plays ===
Year	Title	Peak chart positions	
Year	Title	NOR	NOR Vinyl
Roy Pablo	Released: 19 May 2017; Label: 777 Music; Format: CD, LP, digital download, streaming, cassette	—	4
Soy Pablo	Released: 5 October 2018; Label: 777 Music; Format: CD, LP, digital download, streaming, cassette	40	1

=== Singles ===
Year	Title	Peak chart positions			Certifications	Album/EP
Year	Title	NOR Air.	BEL (WA) Tip	US Rock Air.	Certifications	Album/EP
2016	"Flowers"	—	—	—		Non-album singles
2016	"Beach House Interlude"	—	—	—		Non-album singles
2016	"Ur Phone"	—	—	—		Roy Pablo
2017	"Everytime"	—	—	—	RIAA: Gold	Roy Pablo
2018	"Losing You"	2	11	—		Soy Pablo
2018	"Sick Feeling"	—	—	—		Soy Pablo
2019	"Never Cared" (with Jimi Somewhere)	—	—	—		Non-album single
2020	"Hey Girl"	31	— (Note: "Hey Girl" did not enter the Ultratop Flanders singles chart but did spend four weeks as an extra tip on both the Flanders and Wallonia Ultratip singles chart.)	48		Wachito Rico
2020	"I Just Wanna Go Home"	—	—	—		Wachito Rico
2020	"Honey"	—	—	—		Wachito Rico
2020	"Rest Up"	—	—	—		Wachito Rico
2020	"Leave Me Alone!"	—	—	—		Wachito Rico
2022	"La novela" (with Cuco)	—	—	—		Non-album singles
2022	"Be Mine"	—	—	—		Non-album singles

=== Other certified singles ===
Year	Title	Certifications	Album/EP
2017	"Dance, Baby!"	RIAA: Gold	Roy Pablo

== Awards and nominations ==
Award	Year	Category	Work	Result	Ref.
Spellemannprisen	2018	Breakthrough of the Year and Gramo Scholarship	Boy Pablo	Won	
Spellemannprisen	2018	Indie	Soy Pablo	Nominated	
Spellemannprisen	2018	International Success of the Year	Boy Pablo	Nominated	
Spellemannprisen	2019	International Success of the Year	Boy Pablo	Nominated	
Spellemannprisen	2019	Music Video of the Year	"Feeling Lonely"	Nominated	
P3 Gull	2018	Newcomer of the Year	Boy Pablo	Won	
GAFFA Awards (Norway)	2018	Norwegian Newcomer of the Year	Boy Pablo	Nominated	
GAFFA Awards (Norway)	2018	Norwegian Hit of the Year	"Losing You"	Nominated	
GAFFA Awards (Norway)	2018	Norwegian Album of the Year	Soy Pablo	Nominated	
