= ARIA Award for Best Group =

Annual Australian music industry award

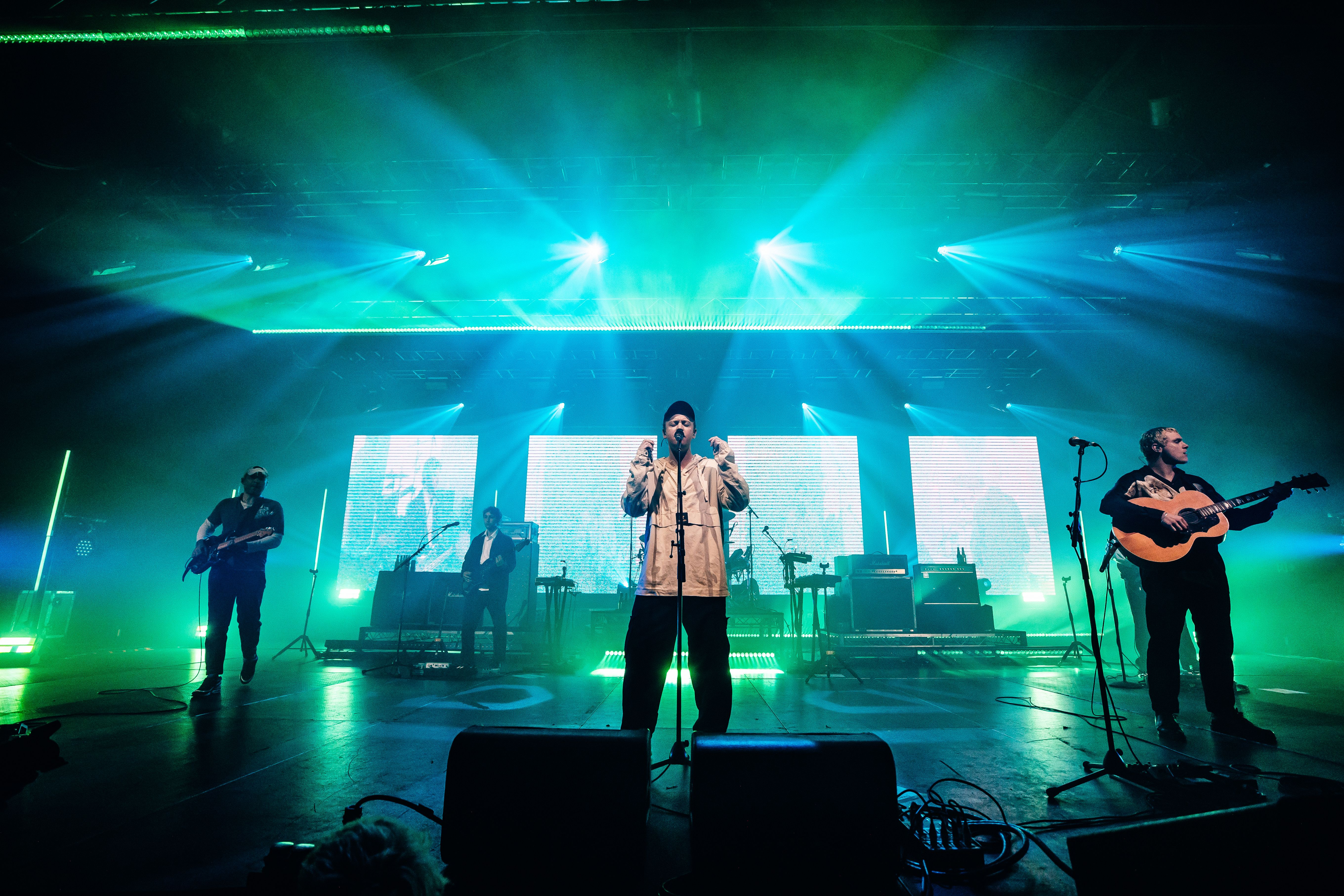
- 2026 winner DMA's
- Country: Australia
- Presented by: Australian Recording Industry Association (ARIA)
- First award: 1987
- Currently held by: DMA's, DMA's (2026)

Highlights
- Most wins: INXS and Tame Impala (3 each)
- Most nominations: Powderfinger (10)
- Website: ariaawards.com.au

The ARIA Music Award for Best Group, is an award presented at the annual ARIA Music Awards, which recognises "the many achievements of Aussie artists across all music genres", since 1987. It is handed out by the Australian Recording Industry Association (ARIA), an organisation whose aim is "to advance the interests of the Australian record industry." The award is given to an Australian group comprising two or more members for an album or single release. The accolade is voted for by a judging academy which comprises 1000 members from different areas of the music industry.

The award for Best Group was first presented to INXS in 1987, for their single "Listen Like Thieves". INXS and Tame Impala are tied for the most wins with three each. Powderfinger have the most nominations with 10, while Hilltop Hoods and Hunters & Collectors are tied for the most nominations without a win with five each. The Cruel Sea became the only group to win in consecutive years with their second win in 1995. Two groups, the Temper Trap and Amyl and the Sniffers, have won both their nominations.

== Winners and nominees ==
In the following table, the winner is highlighted in a separate colour, and in boldface; the nominees are those that are not highlighted or in boldface. All reliable sources used in this article make no mention of nominees from 1989 - 1991. 1987 information is based on an ARIA-supplied video.

Winner marked in a separate colour

| Year | Winner(s) | Album/Single Title |
|---|---|---|
| **1987** (1st) | **INXS** | **"Listen Like Thieves"** |
| **1987** (1st) | Crowded House | "Don't Dream It's Over" |
| **1987** (1st) | Hunters & Collectors | Human Frailty |
| **1987** (1st) | Midnight Oil | The Dead Heart |
| **1987** (1st) | Pseudo Echo | "Funkytown" |
**1988** (2nd)
| **1988** (2nd) | **Crowded House** | —N/a |
| **1988** (2nd) | Hunters & Collectors | —N/a |
| **1988** (2nd) | Icehouse | —N/a |
| **1988** (2nd) | INXS | —N/a |
| **1988** (2nd) | Midnight Oil | —N/a |
**1989** (3rd)
| **1989** (3rd) | **INXS** | **"Never Tear Us Apart"** |
| **1989** (3rd) | The Black Sorrows | Hold On To Me |
| **1989** (3rd) | Crowded House | Temple of Low Men |
| **1989** (3rd) | The Go-Betweens | 16 Lovers Lane |
| **1989** (3rd) | Midnight Oil | "Dreamworld" |
**1990** (4th)
| **1990** (4th) | **The Black Sorrows** | **Hold On To Me** |
| **1990** (4th) | 1927 | "Compulsory Hero" |
| **1990** (4th) | Boom Crash Opera | These Here Are Crazy Times |
| **1990** (4th) | Johnny Diesel & the Injectors | Johnny Diesel & the Injectors |
| **1990** (4th) | Hunters & Collectors | Ghost Nation |
**1991** (5th)
| **1991** (5th) | **Midnight Oil** | **Blue Sky Mining** |
| **1991** (5th) | Boom Crash Opera | Look! Listen!! |
| **1991** (5th) | The Black Sorrows | Harley and Rose |
| **1991** (5th) | Hunters & Collectors | "Throw Your Arms Around Me" |
| **1991** (5th) | INXS | X |
**1992** (6th)
| **1992** (6th) | **INXS** | **Live Baby Live** |
| **1992** (6th) | Baby Animals | Baby Animals |
| **1992** (6th) | The Black Sorrows | "Never Let Me Go" |
| **1992** (6th) | Crowded House | Woodface |
| **1992** (6th) | Hunters & Collectors | "Where Do You Go?" |
**1993** (7th)
| **1993** (7th) | **Crowded House** | **"Weather with You"** |
| **1993** (7th) | Baby Animals | "One Word" |
| **1993** (7th) | The Black Sorrows | Better Times |
| **1993** (7th) | The Cruel Sea | This Is Not the Way Home |
| **1993** (7th) | INXS | Welcome to Wherever You Are |
**1994** (8th)
| **1994** (8th) | **The Cruel Sea** | **The Honeymoon Is Over** |
| **1994** (8th) | Baby Animals | Shaved and Dangerous |
| **1994** (8th) | Crowded House | Together Alone |
| **1994** (8th) | INXS | Full Moon, Dirty Hearts |
| **1994** (8th) | Midnight Oil | Earth and Sun and Moon |
**1995** (9th)
| **1995** (9th) | **The Cruel Sea** | **Three Legged Dog** |
| **1995** (9th) | Nick Cave and the Bad Seeds | Let Love In |
| **1995** (9th) | Crowded House | Private Universe |
| **1995** (9th) | Silverchair | Frogstomp |
| **1995** (9th) | You Am I | Hi Fi Way |
**1996** (10th)
| **1996** (10th) | **You Am I** | **Hourly, Daily** (Note: ARIA lists You Am I as the winner of 'Best Group' category but does not display its 'Best Album' category winner here. Other nominees have an album or single displayed.) |
| **1996** (10th) | The Badloves | Holy Roadside |
| **1996** (10th) | Crowded House | "Everything Is Good for You" |
| **1996** (10th) | Regurgitator | Tu-Plang |
| **1996** (10th) | Silverchair | "Blind" |
**1997** (11th)
| **1997** (11th) | **Savage Garden** | **Savage Garden** |
| **1997** (11th) | Crowded House | "Instinct" |
| **1997** (11th) | Powderfinger | Double Allergic |
| **1997** (11th) | Silverchair | Freak Show |
| **1997** (11th) | Spiderbait | Ivy and the Big Apples |
**1998** (12th)
| **1998** (12th) | **The Whitlams** | **Eternal Nightcap** |
| **1998** (12th) | Regurgitator | Unit |
| **1998** (12th) | Savage Garden | "Universe" |
| **1998** (12th) | The Superjesus | Sumo |
| **1998** (12th) | You Am I | #4 Record |
**1999** (13th)
| **1999** (13th) | **The Living End** | **The Living End** |
| **1999** (13th) | Powderfinger | Internationalist |
| **1999** (13th) | Regurgitator | "! (The Song Formerly Known As)" |
| **1999** (13th) | Silverchair | Neon Ballroom |
| **1999** (13th) | You Am I | "Heavy Heart" |
**2000** (14th)
| **2000** (14th) | **Killing Heidi** | **Reflector** |
| **2000** (14th) | Powderfinger | "Passenger" |
| **2000** (14th) | Savage Garden | "Affirmation" |
| **2000** (14th) | Shihad | The General Electric |
| **2000** (14th) | Madison Avenue | "Don't Call Me Baby" |
**2001** (15th)
| **2001** (15th) | **Powderfinger** | **Odyssey Number Five** |
| **2001** (15th) | The Avalanches | Since I Left You |
| **2001** (15th) | Killing Heidi | "Superman Supergirl" |
| **2001** (15th) | Something for Kate | Echolalia |
| **2001** (15th) | You Am I | Dress Me Slowly |
**2002** (16th)
| **2002** (16th) | **Silverchair** | **Diorama** |
| **2002** (16th) | george | Polyserena |
| **2002** (16th) | Grinspoon | New Detention |
| **2002** (16th) | Powderfinger | "The Metre/Waiting for the Sun" |
| **2002** (16th) | The Vines | Highly Evolved |
**2003** (17th)
| **2003** (17th) | **Powderfinger** | **Vulture Street** |
| **2003** (17th) | Grinspoon | "No Reason" |
| **2003** (17th) | Silverchair | "Across the Night" |
| **2003** (17th) | Something for Kate | The Official Fiction |
| **2003** (17th) | The Waifs | Up All Night |
**2004** (18th)
| **2004** (18th) | **Jet** | **Get Born** |
| **2004** (18th) | The Cat Empire | The Cat Empire |
| **2004** (18th) | Eskimo Joe | A Song Is a City |
| **2004** (18th) | Powderfinger | "Sunsets" |
| **2004** (18th) | The Dissociatives | The Dissociatives |
**2005** (19th)
| **2005** (19th) | **Eskimo Joe** | **"Older Than You"** |
| **2005** (19th) | Evermore | Dreams |
| **2005** (19th) | Grinspoon | Thrills, Kills & Sunday Pills |
| **2005** (19th) | Powderfinger | These Days |
| **2005** (19th) | Thirsty Merc | "Someday, Someday" |
**2006** (20th)
| **2006** (20th) | **Wolfmother** | **Wolfmother** |
| **2006** (20th) | Augie March | Moo, You Bloody Choir |
| **2006** (20th) | Eskimo Joe | Black Fingernails, Red Wine |
| **2006** (20th) | Rogue Traders | Here Come the Drums |
| **2006** (20th) | The Living End | State of Emergency |
**2007** (21st)
| **2007** (21st) | **Silverchair** | **Young Modern** |
| **2007** (21st) | Eskimo Joe | "Sarah" |
| **2007** (21st) | Powderfinger | Dream Days at the Hotel Existence |
| **2007** (21st) | Sneaky Sound System | Sneaky Sound System |
| **2007** (21st) | Wolfmother | "Joker & the Thief" |
**2008** (22nd)
| **2008** (22nd) | **The Presets** | **Apocalypso** |
| **2008** (22nd) | Angus & Julia Stone | A Book Like This |
| **2008** (22nd) | Faker | Be the Twilight |
| **2008** (22nd) | Silverchair | If You Keep Losing Sleep |
| **2008** (22nd) | The Living End | White Noise |
**2009** (23rd)
| **2009** (23rd) | **Empire of the Sun** | **Walking on a Dream** |
| **2009** (23rd) | AC/DC | Black Ice |
| **2009** (23rd) | Eskimo Joe | Inshalla |
| **2009** (23rd) | Hilltop Hoods | State of the Art |
| **2009** (23rd) | The Drones | Havilah |
**2010** (24th)
| **2010** (24th) | **The Temper Trap** | **Conditions** |
| **2010** (24th) | Angus & Julia Stone | Down the Way |
| **2010** (24th) | Birds of Tokyo | Birds of Tokyo |
| **2010** (24th) | Powderfinger | Golden Rule |
| **2010** (24th) | Tame Impala | Innerspeaker |
**2011** (25th)
| **2011** (25th) | **Boy & Bear** | **Moonfire** |
| **2011** (25th) | Birds of Tokyo | "Wild at Heart" |
| **2011** (25th) | Eskimo Joe | Ghosts of the Past |
| **2011** (25th) | Grinderman | Grinderman 2 |
| **2011** (25th) | The Living End | The Ending Is Just the Beginning Repeating |
**2012** (26th)
| **2012** (26th) | **The Temper Trap** | **The Temper Trap** |
| **2012** (26th) | Boy & Bear | "Big Man" |
| **2012** (26th) | Cold Chisel | No Plans |
| **2012** (26th) | Hilltop Hoods | Drinking from the Sun |
| **2012** (26th) | The Jezabels | Prisoner |
**2013** (27th)
| **2013** (27th) | **Tame Impala** | **Lonerism** |
| **2013** (27th) | Birds of Tokyo | March Fires |
| **2013** (27th) | Boy & Bear | Harlequin Dream |
| **2013** (27th) | Empire of the Sun | Ice on the Dune |
| **2013** (27th) | Nick Cave and the Bad Seeds | Push the Sky Away |
**2014** (28th)
| **2014** (28th) | **Sheppard** | **Bombs Away** |
| **2014** (28th) | 5 Seconds of Summer | 5 Seconds of Summer |
| **2014** (28th) | Hilltop Hoods | Walking Under Stars |
| **2014** (28th) | RÜFÜS | "Sundream" |
| **2014** (28th) | Violent Soho | "Saramona Said" |
**2015** (29th)
| **2015** (29th) | **Tame Impala** | **Currents** |
| **2015** (29th) | 5 Seconds of Summer | LiveSOS |
| **2015** (29th) | AC/DC | Rock or Bust |
| **2015** (29th) | Hermitude | Dark Night Sweet Light |
| **2015** (29th) | The Preatures | Blue Planet Eyes |
**2016** (30th)
| **2016** (30th) | **Violent Soho** | **Waco** |
| **2016** (30th) | King Gizzard & the Lizard Wizard | Nonagon Infinity |
| **2016** (30th) | RÜFÜS | Bloom |
| **2016** (30th) | The Avalanches | Wildflower |
| **2016** (30th) | The Veronicas | "In My Blood" |
**2017** (31st)
| **2017** (31st) | **Gang of Youths** | **Go Farther in Lightness** |
| **2017** (31st) | A.B. Original | Reclaim Australia |
| **2017** (31st) | King Gizzard & the Lizard Wizard | Flying Microtonal Banana |
| **2017** (31st) | Nick Cave & the Bad Seeds | Skeleton Tree |
| **2017** (31st) | Peking Duk | "Stranger" (featuring Elliphant) |
**2018** (32nd)
| **2018** (32nd) | **5 Seconds of Summer** | **Youngblood** |
| **2018** (32nd) | DMA's | For Now |
| **2018** (32nd) | Peking Duk | "Fire" |
| **2018** (32nd) | Pnau | "Go Bang" |
| **2018** (32nd) | Rüfüs Du Sol | "No Place" |
**2019** (33rd)
| **2019** (33rd) | **The Teskey Brothers** | **Run Home Slow** |
| **2019** (33rd) | 5 Seconds of Summer | "Easier" |
| **2019** (33rd) | Birds of Tokyo | "Good Lord" |
| **2019** (33rd) | Hilltop Hoods | The Great Expanse |
| **2019** (33rd) | Rüfüs Du Sol | Solace |
**2020** (34th)
| **2020** (34th) | **Tame Impala** | **The Slow Rush** |
| **2020** (34th) | 5 Seconds Of Summer | Calm |
| **2020** (34th) | DMA's | The Glow |
| **2020** (34th) | Lime Cordiale | 14 Steps to a Better You |
| **2020** (34th) | The Teskey Brothers | Live at the Forum |
**2021** (35th)
| **2021** (35th) | **Rüfüs Du Sol** | **"Alive"** |
| **2021** (35th) | AC/DC | Power Up |
| **2021** (35th) | Gang of Youths | "The Angel of 8th Ave." |
| **2021** (35th) | Midnight Oil | The Makarrata Project |
| **2021** (35th) | The Avalanches | We Will Always Love You |
**2022** (36th)
| **2022** (36th) | **Amyl and the Sniffers** | **Comfort to Me** |
| **2022** (36th) | Gang of Youths | Angel in Realtime |
| **2022** (36th) | King Stingray | King Stingray |
| **2022** (36th) | Midnight Oil | Resist |
| **2022** (36th) | Rüfüs Du Sol | Surrender |
**2023** (37th)
| **2023** (37th) | **DMA's** | **How Many Dreams?** |
| **2023** (37th) | Cub Sport | Jesus at the Gay Bar |
| **2023** (37th) | King Gizzard & the Lizard Wizard | PetroDragonic Apocalypse; or, Dawn of Eternal Night: An Annihilation of Planet Earth... |
| **2023** (37th) | Parkway Drive | Darker Still |
| **2023** (37th) | The Teskey Brothers | The Winding Way |
**2024** (38th)
| **2024** (38th) | **Royel Otis** | **Pratts & Pain** |
| **2024** (38th) | 3% | Kill the Dead |
| **2024** (38th) | Hiatus Kaiyote | Love Heart Cheat Code |
| **2024** (38th) | Rüfüs Du Sol | Music Is Better |
| **2024** (38th) | Speed | Only One Mode |
**2025** (39th)
| **2025** (39th) | **Amyl and the Sniffers** | **Cartoon Darkness** |
| **2025** (39th) | Folk Bitch Trio | Now Would Be a Good Time |
| **2025** (39th) | Hilltop Hoods | Fall from the Light |
| **2025** (39th) | Royel Otis | Hickey |
| **2025** (39th) | Rüfüs Du Sol | Inhale / Exhale |
**2026** (40th)
| **2026** (40th) | **DMA's** | **DMA's** |
| **2026** (40th) | 5 Seconds of Summer | Everyone's a Star! |
| **2026** (40th) | Gang of Youths | "Things Take Time" |
| **2026** (40th) | Teen Jesus and the Jean Teasers | Glory |
| **2026** (40th) | Vika and Linda | Where Do You Come From? |

== Multiple wins and nominations ==
The following artists have received two or more Best Group ARIA awards:

| Wins | Artist |
|---|---|
| 3 | INXS |
| 3 | Tame Impala |
| 2 | Amyl and the Sniffers |
| 2 | DMA's |
| 2 | Powderfinger |
| 2 | Silverchair |
| 2 | Crowded House |
| 2 | The Cruel Sea |
| 2 | The Temper Trap |

The following groups have received two or more Best Group ARIA nominations:

| Nominations | Artist |
|---|---|
| 10 | Powderfinger |
| 9 | Crowded House |
| 8 | Rüfüs Du Sol |
| 8 | Silverchair |
| 7 | INXS |
| 7 | Midnight Oil |
| 6 | 5 Seconds of Summer |
| 6 | Eskimo Joe |
| 5 | The Black Sorrows |
| 5 | Hilltop Hoods |
| 5 | Hunters & Collectors |
| 5 | You Am I |
| 4 | Birds of Tokyo |
| 4 | Martyn P. Casey (Note: Three as a member of Nick Cave and the Bad Seeds and one as a member of Grinderman.) |
| 4 | Nick Cave |
| 4 | DMA's |
| 4 | Gang of Youths |
| 4 | The Living End |
| 4 | Tame Impala |
| 3 | AC/DC |
| 3 | The Avalanches |
| 3 | Baby Animals |
| 3 | Boy & Bear |
| 3 | The Cruel Sea |
| 3 | Warren Ellis (Note: Two as a member of Nick Cave and the Bad Seeds in 2013 and 2017 and one as a member of Grinderman.) |
| 3 | Grinspoon |
| 3 | King Gizzard & the Lizard Wizard |
| 3 | Nick Littlemore (Note: Two as a member of Empire of the Sun and one as a member of Pnau.) |
| 3 | Nick Cave & the Bad Seeds |
| 3 | Regurgitator |
| 3 | Savage Garden |
| 3 | Jim Sclavunos |
| 3 | The Teskey Brothers |
| 2 | Amyl and the Sniffers |
| 2 | Angus & Julia Stone |
| 2 | Boom Crash Opera |
| 2 | Empire of the Sun |
| 2 | Killing Heidi |
| 2 | Peking Duk |
| 2 | Royel Otis |
| 2 | Something for Kate |
| 2 | The Temper Trap |
| 2 | Violent Soho |
| 2 | Wolfmother |
