= In the Air =

In the Air may refer to:

== Albums ==
- In the Air (The Handsome Family album), 2000
- In the Air (Morgan Page album), 2012

== Songs ==
- "In the Air" (Chipmunk song), 2011
- "In the Air" (DMA's song), 2018
- "In the Air" (L.A.B. song), 2019
- "In the Air" (True Tiger song), 2011
- "In the Air" (TV Rock song), 2010
- "In the Air", a 2010 song by Anika Moa
- "In the Air", a 2022 song by Black Eyed Peas from Elevation
- "In the Air", a 2022 song by Sault from 11
- "In the Air", a 2020 song by Tory Lanez from Daystar

== Other uses ==
- In the Air (film distributor), a Dutch independent film distributor
