= Criminals (DMA's song) =

2020 single by Australian rock band DMA's

Single by DMA's

from the album The Glow
- Released: 7 July 2020
- Length: 3:15
- Label: I OH YOU
- Songwriter(s): Took; Mason; O'Dell

DMA's singles chronology
"Learning Alive" (2020)	"Criminals" (2020)	"Round & Around" (2020)

Music video
- "Criminals" on YouTube

"Criminals" is a song by Australian rock band DMA's. The song premiered on Triple J on 5 July 2020 and was released on 7 July 2020 as the fifth single from their third studio album, The Glow. The song was written during the last few days of the album recording sessions. They performed the song live at the 2020 AFL Grand Final.

The song was number 32 in the Triple J Hottest 100, 2020. At the AIR Awards of 2021, the Avalanches remix won Best Independent Dance, Electronica or Club Single.

== Reception ==
TotalNtertainment said "It begins as a subtle piano based offering and builds quickly into an uplifting pop banger with a punchy, groove-focused hook."

Josh Regan Matthews from The Edge rated the song 4 out of 5 calling the song "a Bold and Successful Experiment". Matthews said "The song heavily focuses on creating an atmosphere for the listener; the opening minute creates a slow and mellow vibe which can be associated to a number of DMA's songs with frontman Tommy O Dell's soft and gentle voice. Once that minute is over though, the song changes completely to a dance-fuelled pop party anthem."

== Track listings ==
Digital download
No.	Title	Length
1.	"Criminals"	3:15

Digital download
No.	Title	Length
1.	"Criminals" (The Avalanches remix)	7:15

Digital download
No.	Title	Length
1.	"Criminals" (acoustic)	3:03
