= I Love You Unconditionally, Sure Am Going to Miss You =

EP by DMA's
- Released: 20 August 2021
- Recorded: Coogee
- Label: I OH YOU
- Producer: DMA's

DMA's chronology
Live at Brixton (2021)	I Love You Unconditionally, Sure Am Going to Miss You (2021)	How Many Dreams? (2023)

Singles from I Love You Unconditionally, Sure Am Going to Miss You
- 1. "We Are Midnight" Released: 20 August 2021; 2. "Junk Truck Head Fuck" Released: 14 October 2021

I Love You Unconditionally, Sure Am Going to Miss You is the second extended play by Australian indie rock band DMA's, released digitally without prior announcement or promotion on 20 August 2021.

The EP was produced by the band themselves, and recorded with Dylan Adams, who also engineered the trio's 2014 self-titled EP. In a statement, Johnny Took said, "This EP was in the natural trajectory that you can sometimes take in a band. You work with different producers, and you want to keep changing, but there's also something in your core that pulls you back. It's cool to get back to your roots sometimes." "By self-producing this EP, we had to take more control of aspects such as this and seeing growth in this facet of our song writing makes us proud to share it with you today."

A limited edition vinyl was released on 8 October 2021.

== Singles ==
"We Are Midnight" was released on 20 August 2021 as the EP's lead single. Took said "In writing the track we felt all the melodic parts were strong but structuring it properly to make the most out of the song was the hardest part. By self-producing this EP, we had to take more control of aspects such as this and seeing growth in this facet of our song writing makes us proud to share it with you today." Tyler Jenke from Rolling Stone Australia called it "the standout moment". The music video is made up of a montage of grainy VHS shot clips of their time experiences during lockdown.

== Track listing ==
All tracks are written by DMA's (Johnny Took, Matthew Mason and Thomas O'Dell).

No.	Title	Length
1.	"1 Way"	4:59
2.	"We Are Midnight"	3:39
3.	"Viol"	3:49
4.	"Junk Truck Head Fuck"	2:34

== Charts ==
Chart performance for I Love You Unconditionally, Sure Am Going to Miss You
Chart (2021)	Peak position
Australia Independent (AIR)	5
UK Vinyl Singles (OCC)	1
