= DMA's (album) =

2026 studio album by DMA's

Studio album by DMA's
- Released: 21 August 2026
- Recorded: Sydney and Los Angeles
- Length: 38:21
- Labels: Wonderlick; Sony Australia
- Producers: Lachlan Bostock; DMA's; Milo Orchis; Benjamin Schandy; Styalz Fuego

DMA's chronology
How Many Dreams? (2023)	DMA's (2026)

Singles from DMA'S
- 1. "My Baby's Place" Released: 20 March 2026; 2. "Heatin Park" Released: 28 April 2026; 3. "Hurracane" Released: 5 June 2026; 4. "Killing Time" Released: 3 July 2026; 5. "Windows" Released: 7 August 2026; 6. "Emailz" Released: 21 August 2026

Singles from DMA'S Deluxe
- 1. "Best Days" Released: 6 November 2026

DMA's is the fifth studio album by Australian indie rock band DMA's, announced in April 2026 and released on 21 August 2026. The album is the band's first to be released via Wonderlick Entertainment partnering with Sony and RCA UK following a signed global deal. Vocalist Tommy O'Dell said, "I love the way it was recorded and the processes we went through to make the album what we wanted. I'm especially proud of it." The album became their first number-one album in Australia.

The group promoted the album with acoustic in-store shows across the United Kingdom during the week of release. A deluxe edition was released on 6 November 2026, featuring 4 new tracks.

The album will be supported with a three date Australian tour in Brisbane, Melbourne and Sydney from 27 November to 3 December 2026.

At the 2026 ARIA Music Awards it was nominated for Album of the Year, Best Rock Album and Best Group, winning all except Album of the Year.

== Singles ==
"My Baby's Place" was released on 20 March 2026 as the album's lead single. It is the band’s first fully self-produced single.

"Heatin Park" was released alongside the album's announcement on 28 April 2026. With Music Feeds staff writer saying "The new self-titled album marks a fresh chapter for the trio, blending their signature anthemic indie sound with some new textures… 'Heatin Park' is already showing off that range – gritty, distorted and stadium-sized – a sharp left turn from the dreamy vibes of 'My Baby's Place'".

"Hurracane" was released on 5 June 2026 as the album's third single, with a Music Talkers review saying "[it] feels instantly familiar while still exploring new territory. It is classic DMA's in spirit, but with fresh textures that help the song stand apart from previous releases."

"Killing Time" was released on 3 July 2026, which Good Call Live described as "fast-paced, euphoric and instantly infectious".

"Windows" was released on 7 August 2026. Hayley Grice from Reyt Good Magazine said "This is an instant goer with Tommy's vocal’s cutting in and has almost a gospel like echo on it and it hooked me straight away, the guitar instrumental is a stunning accompaniment to it."

"Emailz" was released alongside the album on 21 August 2026, accompanied with an animated monochrome video.

== Critical reception ==
Professional ratings
Review scores
Source	Rating
Erazer Mag	4.5/5 stars
Northern Exposure	5/5 stars
The Upcoming	4/5 stars

Ethan Vine from Erazer said, "The album comes drilled with tracks that feel painfully personal and musically comfortable, drawing on the best of their earlier works whilst unafraid to try out a diversity of new sounds."

Morgan from Northern Exposure gave the album a perfect 5/5 saying the album is "a sound that they're innately known for, while also delving into some of their most vulnerable work to date. It's an album that has definitely been recorded with live audiences in mind, but as a stand-alone piece of music, it's just as impeccable."

Hayley Grice from Reyt Good Magazine called the album "brilliant" saying it "really shows off the talents of Tommy, Johnny and Mason, I feel like they get better every year."

In a 4 out of 5 star review, Sofia Hamandi from The Upcoming said "DMA's is not so much a change or a sonic turning point... they have returned to their classic sound with great success." Hamandi named "Hurracane" as the strongest calling it "instantly attention-grabbing with a strong melody, it stays lodged in the mind".

== Track listing ==
All tracks are written by Matthew Mason, Thomas O'Dell, and John Took, with other writers noted.

DMA's track listing
No.	Title	Writer(s)	Producer(s)	Length
1.	"El Alamein"	Liam Hoskins; Nooky	DMA's; Lachlan Bostock	3:50
2.	"My Baby's Place"	Darko Vidovic	DMA's; Bostock; Milo Orchis; Benjamin Schandy	3:55
3.	"Hurracane"	Hoskins	DMA's; BOstock; Orchis; Schandy	3:05
4.	"Killing Time"	Kaelyn Behr; Bostock; Hoskins	DMA's; Bostock; Styalz Fuego	3:32
5.	"Heatin Park"	Hoskins; Orchis	DMA's; Bostock; Orchis; Schandy	3:11
6.	"Emailz"	Hoskins	DMA's; Bostock	3:37
7.	"One & Only"	Hoskins	Bostock	3:14
8.	"Dancing Luck"	Hoskins	DMA's; Bostock; Orchis; Schandy	3:59
9.	"Concrete"	Hoskins	DMA's; Bostock; Orchis; Schandy	3:39
10.	"Windows"	JT Daly; Hoskins; Trent Dabbs	DMA's; Bostock	2:50
11.	"Distance"	Behr; Hoskins; Lindsay Rimes	DMA's; Bostock	3:29
Total length:				38:21

DMA's (Deluxe) track listing
No.	Title	Length
2.	"Best Life"	3:03
13.	"Don't Change"	3:01
14.	"My Baby's Place" (acoustic)	3:46
15.	"Heatin Peak" (acoustic)	3:21
Total length:		51:38

== Personnel ==
Credits adapted from Tidal.

=== DMA's ===
- Matthew Mason – guitar, vocals (all tracks); engineering (tracks 1–7, 9–11)
- Thomas O'Dell – vocals
- John Took – guitar (all tracks), engineering (7, 8)

=== Additional contributors ===
- Lachlan Bostock – engineering (all tracks), vocals (8)
- James Lewis – engineering
- Cian Riordan – mixing
- Leon Zervos – mastering
- Liam Hoskins – drums (1–9, 11)
- Paddy Harrowsmith – guitar (1, 4, 9, 11)
- Jonathan Skourletos – bass (2, 6, 7)
- Benjamin Schandy – engineering (2, 5), vocals (2)
- Milo Orchis – engineering (2, 5)
- Darko Vidovic – vocals (2)
- Rosie Fitzgerald – vocals (2)
- Styalz Fuego – engineering (4)
- Alannah Guiney – vocals (8)
- Eamon Smith – engineering (9, 11), acoustic guitar (9)

== Charts ==
Chart performance for DMA's
Chart (2026)	Peak position
Australian Albums (ARIA)	1
Scottish Albums (Official Charts)	3
UK Albums (Official Charts)	9

== See also ==
- List of number-one albums of 2026 (Australia)
