= April Lawlor =

Irish pop singer

- Also known as: April
- Born: Dublin
- Origin: Ireland
- Genres: Pop; Indie pop; R&B
- Instruments: Vocals
- Labels: Vision; Atlantic

April Lawlor, known professionally as simply April, is an Irish pop singer and songwriter. Born in Dublin and raised in County Kildare, she was by February 2022 based in London and had signed to Atlantic Records.

== Life and career ==
April was born in Dublin but moved to Kilcullen as a kid, when she was about to start school. She developed an interest in music from a young age, since her dad himself had always done music. She took piano lessons for a few months as a kid and can play the piano and the guitar, though she says she can't play either perfectly. April wrote songs throughout her childhood. April began her music career by uploading songs to SoundCloud. In 2019 she went on tour with Alec Benjamin in Europe. In 2021 she signed to Atlantic Records.

== Musical style ==
In 2020, April Lawlor cited Lana Del Rey as an influence.Her songs have been described as introspective pop. In February 2022 she described FKA Twigs, Charli XCX, and The 1975 as additional influences. Having been a fan of Lady Gaga since childhood, April describes Lady Gaga and Miley Cyrus as inspirations in her childhood dream of becoming a popstar. April's single Someone That I Made has been called "an ode to her rural Irish roots". The show Euphoria inspired April as she made the storyboards for the music video to Piece of Me.

== Discography ==
=== Extended plays ===
Title	Details
New Conditions	Released: 1 May 2020; Label: Vision
Luna	Released: 23 October 2020; Label: Vision
When It Comes to You	Released: 23 March 2022; Label: Atlantic Records
Starlane	Released: 20 October 2022; Label: Atlantic Records

=== Singles ===
Title	Details
The Impossible Task of Feeling Complete	Released: 21 February 2020; Label: Vision
Forever (To Feel Like Tonight)	Released: 14 August 2020; Label: Vision
Piece of Me	Released: 15 September 2021; Label: Atlantic Records
Someone That I Made	Released: 24 November 2021; Label: Atlantic Records
Hotel	Released: 23 February 2022; Label: Atlantic Records
That Feeling	Released: 15 June 2022; Label: Atlantic Records
54321	Released: 27 July 2022; Label: Atlantic Records
Impossible (featuring Jimi Somewhere)	Released: 30 September 2022; Label: Atlantic Records
Distraction	Released: 14 October 2022; Label: Atlantic Records
Stretch	Released: 5 April 2024; Label: Fader Label
