= Kongshaug Upper Secondary School of Music =

Kongshaug Musikkgymnas
- Lepsøy, Vestland; Norway

Information
- Type: Private
- Motto: Skapt til utfoldelse
- Established: 1999
- Head teacher: Oddvar Inge Rotvik
- Enrollment: 90
- Campus: Rural
- Branch of study: Music
- Website: Kongshaug

Kongshaug Upper Secondary School of Music (Norwegian: Kongshaug Musikkgymnas) is an upper secondary school situated in Os which is south of Bergen. Originally a folkehøyskole, it was converted to a secondary school in 1999. It is owned by the Lutheran organization Norwegian Lutheran Mission.

Every year, in the end of November, the students in 3rd grade arrange a festival on campus, open for the public. Previous festivals have included performances by Robert Post and Maria Solheim, among others.

Kongshaugbladet is a magazine edited and published by students at Kongshaug High School of Music. The magazine is received by all former students and families of current students. It regularly updated and the content is mostly about the milieu at Kongshaug. It typically contains articles and poems written by current and previous students and teachers. The headmaster of Kongshaug has his own column in which he writes about Christian beliefs and the everyday life at Kongshaug. Kongshaug is a boarding school, and most of the students choose to live in the dorms. There are two main dorms, in addition to a few houses which some of the students share.
