= Life Is a Game of Changing =

2020 single by Australian rock band DMA's

Single by DMA's

from the album The Glow
- B-side: "Silver"
- Released: 31 January 2020
- Genre: New rave
- Length: 4:16
- Label: I OH YOU
- Songwriters: Took; Mason; O'Dell
- Producer: Stuart Price

DMA's singles chronology
"Silver" (2019)	"Life Is a Game of Changing" (2020)	"The Glow" (2020)

Music video
- "Life is a Game of Changing" on YouTube

"Life Is a Game of Changing" is a song by Australian rock band DMA's. It was released on 31 January 2020. as the second single from their third studio album, The Glow.

The song was the band's second single to chart (and their first to chart internationally), peaking at 99 in Scotland.

The song was nominated for Best Single at the 2021 Rolling Stone Australia Awards.

== Track listings ==
Digital download
No.	Title	Length
1.	"Life Is a Game of Changing"	4:16

Digital download – Radio Edit
No.	Title	Length
1.	"Life Is a Game of Changing" (radio edit)	3:26

Digital download – Willaris. K remix
No.	Title	Length
1.	"Life Is a Game of Changing" (Willaris. K remix)	5:06

Digital download – Martin Buttrich remix
No.	Title	Length
1.	"Life Is a Game of Changing" (Martin Buttrich remix)	4:07
2.	"Life Is a Game of Changing" (Martin Buttrich extended remix)	8:31

Digital download – Orbital remix
No.	Title	Length
1.	"Life Is a Game of Changing" (Orbital remix)	5:02

== Charts ==
Chart performance for "Life Is a Game of Changing"
Chart (2020)	Peak position
Scottish Singles Sales (Official Charts)	99
