= Jimi Somewhere =

Norwegian singer-songwriter

- Born: Benjamin Schandy; 18 August 1998 (age 27); Hokksund, Norway
- Genres: Indie pop; electronic pop; alternative
- Occupations: Singer; Songwriter
- Instrument: Vocals
- Years active: 2016–present
- Labels: Ultra Records; Next Wave Records; Inquiring Minds
- Website: jimisomewhere.com

Benjamin Schandy (born 18 August 1998), better known by his stage name Jimi Somewhere, is a Norwegian singer-songwriter, music producer and designer. His musical genres are alternative, indie and electronic pop.

== Career ==
=== 2016-2018: Early career and debut EP Memoria ===
In 2016 Jimi was named "Ukas Urørt" by Norwegian radio station NRK P3. The following year, he released his debut EP Memoria, through his record label Inquiring Minds. The EP was precedeed by two singles "Escape" and "The Beach".

In the same year, American magazine The Fader posted a list of 15 Scandinavian artists to listen to in 2018, with Jimi as number nine. Jimi also performed at festivals such as Ekkofestival and by:Larm. In 2018 he joined Norwegian indie band Boy Pablo on their European tour.

=== 2019: Second EP Ponyboy ===
In 2019, he released his second EP Ponyboy on 5 April, in which it was produced and recorded in Los Angeles. The EP was preceded by two singles "1st Place" and "I Shot My Dog". The former was released on 8 February 2019, while the latter was released on 8 March.

=== 2020-present: Debut album Nothing Gold Can Stay ===
On 14 May 2020, Jimi announced the title of his debut album Nothing Gold Can Stay, which was originally planned to be released in 2020. The album's lead single "Bottle Rocket" was released on 31 July 2020. The second single "Jesus" was released on 11 September 2020. The song features guest vocals from American singer-songwriter Kacy Hill. On 13 November 2020, "In My Car" was released as the third single. The album's fourth single "Wedding" was released on 11 December 2020. The fifth and final single "The World" was released on 22 January 2021. The album was finally released on 5 February 2021.

== Discography ==
=== Studio albums ===
List of albums, with selected details
| Title | Details |
|---|---|
| Nothing Gold Can Stay | Released: 5 February 2021; Label: Ultra Records, Next Wave Records; Format: Digital download, streaming, CD |

=== Extended plays ===
List of extended plays, showing extended play details
| Title | Details |
|---|---|
| Memoria | Released: 18 August 2017; Label: Inquiring Minds; Formats: Digital download, streaming |
| Ponyboy | Released: 5 April 2019; Label: Next Wave Records, Ultra Records; Formats: Digital download, streaming |

=== Singles ===
==== As lead artist ====
List of singles with title, year, and album
| Title | Year | Album |
|---|---|---|
| "Escape" | 2017 | Memoria |
| "The Beach" | 2017 | Memoria |
| "Waking Up" | 2017 | Non-album singles |
| "Fall Down" (with Hanne Mjøen) | 2018 | Non-album singles |
| "1st Place" | 2019 | Ponyboy |
| "I Shot My Dog" (with Milo Orchis) | 2019 | Ponyboy |
| "Never Cared" (with Boy Pablo) | 2019 | Non-album singles |
| "Dusk" | 2019 | Non-album singles |
| "Benton Way" | 2019 | Non-album singles |
| "Backseat" | 2019 | Non-album singles |
| "Selfish" | 2020 | Non-album singles |
| "Bottle Rocket" | 2020 | Nothing Gold Can Stay |
| "Jesus" (featuring Kacy Hill) | 2020 | Nothing Gold Can Stay |
| "In My Car" | 2020 | Nothing Gold Can Stay |
| "Wedding" | 2020 | Nothing Gold Can Stay |
| "The World" | 2021 | Nothing Gold Can Stay |
| "Headlights" (featuring bülow) | 2021 | Non-album singles |
| "Ford" | 2021 | Non-album singles |
| "We Don't Feel The Same" | 2022 | Non-album singles |
| "Naive" | 2022 | Non-album singles |
| "Baby From Atlanta" | 2023 | TBA |
| "Honest" | 2023 | TBA |

==== As featured artist ====
List of singles as featured artist, showing title, year released, and album name
| Title | Year | Album |
|---|---|---|
| "Towers" (Milo Orchis featuring Jimi Somewhere) | 2018 | Non-album singles |
| "Pressure Love" (Safario and Lokoy featuring Jimi Somewhere) | 2020 | Non-album singles |
| "Staying In Bed Too Late" (Internet Girl featuring Jimi Somewhere) | 2020 | Non-album singles |
| "You and I" (Pasha and Wonder the Boy featuring Jimi Somewhere) | 2021 | Non-album singles |
| "KILOS (Jimi's Version)" (Sam Austins featuring Jimi Somewhere) | 2021 | Non-album singles |
| "Impossible" (April featuring Jimi Somewhere) | 2022 | TBA |
| "ANGELA" (Sval featuring Jimi Somewhere) | 2023 | TBA |

==== Promotional singles ====
List of promotional singles, showing title, year released, and album name
| Title | Year | Album |
|---|---|---|
| "Little Things" (Spotify Studio Oyster Recording) (with Bearson) | 2021 | Non-album singles |
| "Tears '06" | 2022 | Non-album singles |

=== Guest appearances ===
List of non-single guest appearances, with other performing artists, showing year released and album name
| Title | Year | Other artist(s) | Album |
|---|---|---|---|
| "Not Enough" | 2017 | Sean Headley, Roy Blair | Non-album song |
| "Woods" | 2018 | Pasha | Park. |
| "Puppy Love" | 2019 | bülow | The Contender |
| "Trees" | 2021 | Young Lungs | Lonely Never Felt So Good |
