= Hills End (album) =

Studio album by DMA's
- Released: 26 February 2016
- Recorded: 2014–2015
- Genre: Britpop Revival
- Length: 46:02
- Label: I OH YOU, Mom + Pop Music, Infectious
- Producer: Dylan Adams, DMA's

DMA's chronology
DMA's (2014)	Hills End (2016)	For Now (2018)

Singles from Hills End
- 1. "Lay Down" Released: 29 September 2015; 2. "Too Soon" Released: 13 January 2016; 3. "In the Moment" Released: 18 February 2016; 4. "Timeless" Released: 24 June 2016; 5. "Step Up the Morphine" Released: September 2016

Hills End is the debut album by Australian indie rock band DMA's, released on 26 February 2016. It peaked at number eight for one week in March 2016 on the ARIA Albums Chart. The album also charted in the United Kingdom and the Netherlands. The album has received BRIT Certified Breakthrough status.

In February 2026, a 10th Anniversary limited edition vinyl will be released, with a second LP of early demos recorded by the group.

== Track listing ==
All tracks are written by DMA's (Johnny Took, Matthew Mason and Thomas O'Dell), except where noted.

No.	Title	Writer(s)	Length
1.	"Timeless"	Took; Mason; O'Dell; Thomas Crandles	4:42
2.	"Lay Down"	Took; Mason; O'Dell; Patrick Harrowsmith	3:14
3.	"Delete"		4:27
4.	"Too Soon"	Took; Mason; O'Dell; Crandles	3:23
5.	"In the Moment"	Took; Mason; O'Dell; Harrowsmith	3:52
6.	"Step Up the Morphine"	Took; Mason; O'Dell; Crandles	2:52
7.	"So We Know"		3:26
8.	"Melbourne"	Took; Mason; O'Dell; Crandles	3:35
9.	"Straight Dimensions"		4:05
10.	"Blown Away"		4:44
11.	"The Switch"		4:21
12.	"Play It Out"	Took; Mason; O'Dell; Crandles	3:25

== Personnel ==
Credits adapted from the album's liner notes.

DMA's

- Thomas O'Dell – vocals, drums on "Blown Away" and "Play It Out"
- Matthew Mason – guitars, vocals, keys
- Johnny Took – guitars, bass on "Blown Away"

Additional musicians

- Paddy Harrowsmith – guitars
- Liam Hoskins – drums
- Thomas Crandles – bass (except "Delete" and "Lay Down")
- Paddy Cornwall – bass on "Delete" and "Lay Down"

== Charts ==
Chart (2016)	Peak position
Australian Albums (ARIA)	8
Dutch Albums (Album Top 100)	75
UK Albums (OCC)	36

Chart (2026)	Peak position
Scottish Albums (OCC)	14

== Certifications ==
Certifications for Hills End
Region	Certification	Certified units/sales
United Kingdom (BPI)	Silver	60,000^{‡}
^{‡} Sales+streaming figures based on certification alone.
