= Hulen =

Norwegian rock club

Coordinates: 60.3851°N 5.32455°E

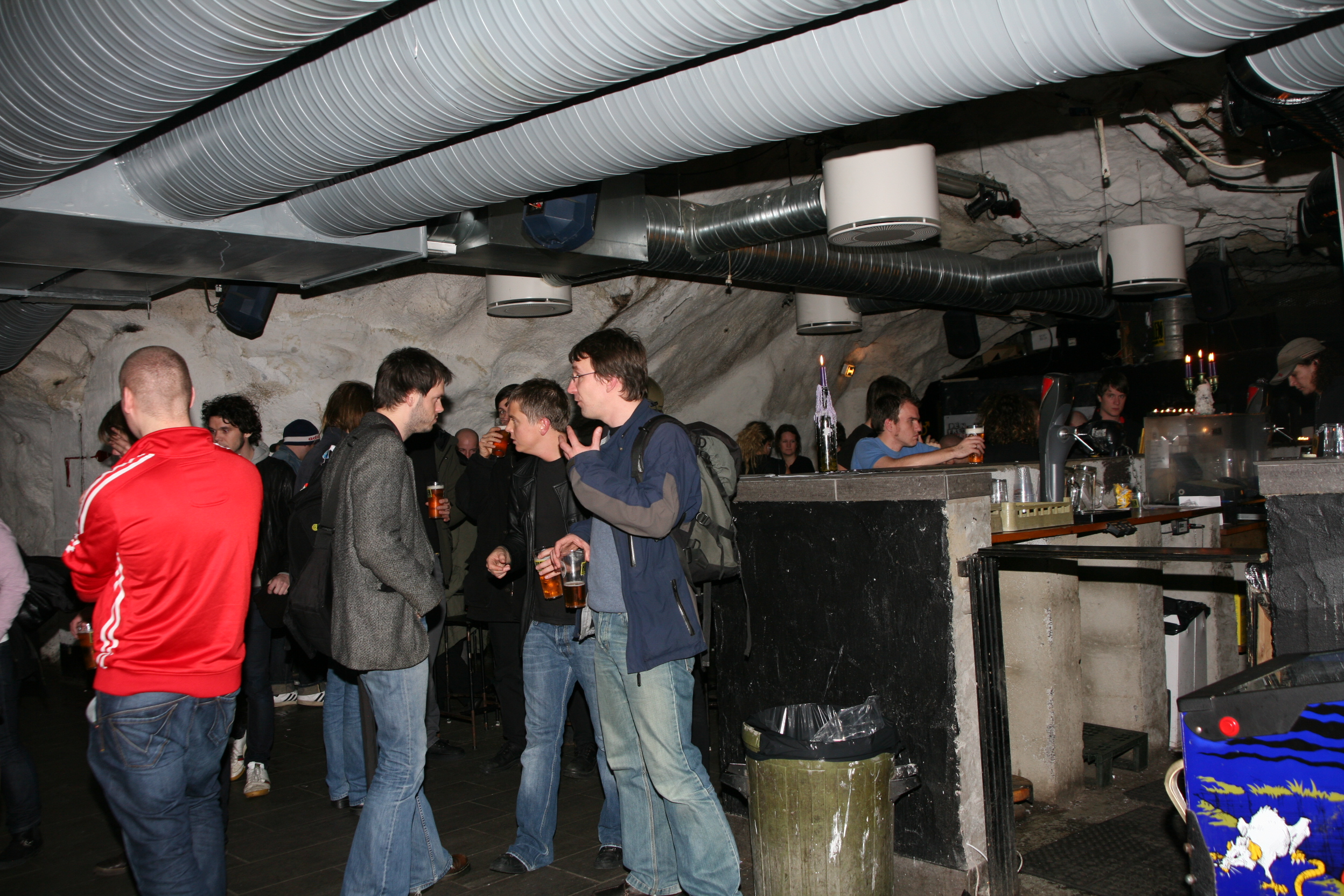

Hulen ('The Cave') is a student-driven rock club in Bergen, Norway, that opened on 17 May 1969. Hulen has its premises in an old bomb shelter below Nygårdshøyden in the city center of Bergen. The shelter is rented from the Norwegian Civil Defence. During its 40 years of existence Hulen has been threatened with bankruptcy etc., but has managed to continue because of their volunteers and supporters.

== History ==
Hulen was once an air-raid shelter, which in 1968 was converted into a club for local students in Bergen, and opened on 17 May 1969. The reason was partly that the students' old resident, Parkveien 1, was torn down. In over 42 years that have elapsed since that time Hulen has also always served as a cultural alternative for students and music people. Hulen is driven by pure idealism. Around 80 people sacrifice some of their best years to keep the wheels rolling in the cave. The music has a main emphasis on alternative rock and pop, but other genres are also allowed, such as jazz, blues, metal and electronica.

Hulen has won best concert venue twice, in 2001 and 2011.
