= Lay Down (DMA's song) =

Single by DMA's

from the album Hills End
- Released: 29 September 2015
- Length: 3:13
- Label: I Oh You
- Songwriter(s): Johnny Took, Matthew Mason, Tommy O'Dell, Patrick Harrowsmith

DMA's singles chronology
"Your Low" (2015)	"Lay Down" (2015)	"Too Soon" (2016)

Music video
- "Lay Down" on YouTube

"Lay Down" is a song by Australian rock band DMA's. It was released in September 2015 as the lead single from their debut album Hills End. The song was premiered on Annie Mac's BBC 1 show and was certified gold in Australia in 2019.

== Reception ==
Cady Siregar from Stereo Gum said the song "intertwines jangly, dreamy shoegaze with uncompromising noise".

== Certifications ==
Region	Certification	Certified units/sales
Australia (ARIA)	Gold	35,000^{‡}
^{‡} Sales+streaming figures based on certification alone.
