= How Many Dreams? =

2023 studio album by DMA's

Studio album by DMA's
- Released: 31 March 2023
- Genres: Britpop revival; indie rock
- Length: 43:53
- Label: I Oh You
- Producers: Rich Costey, Stuart Price, Konstantin Kersting

DMA's chronology
I Love You Unconditionally, Sure Am Going to Miss You (2021)	How Many Dreams? (2023)	DMA's (2026)

Singles from How Many Dreams?
- 1. "I Don't Need to Hide" Released: 17 August 2022; 2. "Everybody's Saying Thursday's the Weekend" Released: 19 October 2022; 3. "Olympia" Released: 9 December 2022; 4. "Fading Like a Picture" Released: 20 January 2023; 5. "Something We Are Overcoming" Released: 1 March 2023; 6. "Forever" Released: 31 March 2023

How Many Dreams? is the fourth studio album by Australian indie rock band DMA's, released on 31 March 2023. It was announced on 19 October 2022, alongside the release of "Everybody's Saying Thursday's the Weekend".

The band describe it the album as "a labour of love", having worked through over 70 demos and recording between lockdown restrictions. Tommy O'Dell said "We spent a long time through lockdown writing a bunch of tunes and also tunes that have been built up over the band's career. I feel like out of all the albums we've done, for this one, it's probably the best selection of songs we've had to choose from".

In January 2023, Johnny Took said, "Our palette for How Many Dreams? album was a lot broader because we've learned so much since our debut. We've listened to so much more music between then and now, which has shaped us. It felt like a first outing all over again."

In March 2023 Took told Rolling Stone, "Other records we've pretty much gone into the studio and two weeks later there's been an album that's come out of it, but this wasn't the case with this one – it was a little more tedious but a lot more rewarding as well."

At the 2023 ARIA Music Awards, the album was nominated for Album of the Year, Best Group and Best Rock Album.

At the AIR Awards of 2024, I OH YOU and Mushroom Group were nominated for Independent Marketing Team of the Year and Independent Publicity Team of the Year. Konstantin Kersting was nominated for Independent Producer of the Year for his work.

== Promotion ==
The album will be promoted by a UK tour, commencing on 5 April 2023 and an 18-date Australian tour commencing in September 2023. Due to demand, additional Australian shows were added in August 2023.

=== Singles ===
"I Don't Need to Hide" was released on 17 August 2022 as the album's lead single. About the song, DMA's guitarist Jonny Took said "There's a confidence you obtain when you find someone who loves you for all your faults, quirks and obscurities." The song coincided with announcement of three headline shows in the United Kingdom in October 2022.

"Everybody's Saying Thursday's the Weekend" was released alongside the album's announcement. The song is described by Triple J's Al Newstead as "a bright, optimistic number with a title drawn from a phone call guitarist Johnny Took had with a mate trying to coax him out for a post-lockdown pint."

"Olympia" was released on 9 December 2022. Emma Whines from The Music said "With fast electric riffs and an uptempo beat, this is the perfect song for the summer. DMA's continue to deliver hits in their signature style, and 'Olympia' is at the top of the pile."

"Fading Like a Picture" was released on 20 January 2023 as the album's fourth single. According to a press release, it was mostly written by Tommy O'Dell, with guitarist Matthew Mason adding the song's riff. Johnny Took said "We used the middle-eight from another demo as the chorus." Took called it "A true DMA's collaboration."

"Something We Are Overcoming" was released on 1 March 2023. The band said it "...started as a moving ballad about perseverance but quickly morphed into a trance-y anthem of a side quest that is slightly but steadily DMA's."

"Forever" was released on 31 March 2023, with the single's video premiering on 4 April 2023.

A music video for "Get Ravey" was released on 7 August 2023.

== Critical reception ==
Professional ratings
Review scores
Source	Rating
Clash	8/10
NME	3/5 stars
All Music Magazine	9/10

Emma Harrison from Clash said "Their impeccably-crafted highly anticipated fourth album weaves in feelings of elation, hope, carefree abandon and celebration that is reflected throughout the twelve tracks".

Thomas Smith from NME said "How Many Dreams? is ambitious and catchy enough to satiate old fans and realign the narrative for those who may have written DMA's off. But it's hard to not leave feeling that this was their moment, and they've only grabbed it with one hand."

Desh Kapur from All Music Magazine said "The whole record is full of shimmering electronics and surging guitars and Tommy's unique sometimes haunting tones bring the lyrics to life and touch you right to your core. That is what makes this record a euphoric celebration of everything that makes the DMA's so brilliant, underlying dance beats, tied together with the band's amazing abilities to write stadium-sized indie bangers".

== Track listing ==
How Many Dreams? track listing
No.	Title	Writer(s)	Length
1.	"How Many Dreams?"		4:05
2.	"Olympia"	Matt Mason; Tommy O'Dell; Johnny Took	3:40
3.	"Everybody's Saying Thursday's the Weekend"	Mason; O'Dell; Took	3:05
4.	"Dear Future"		3:07
5.	"I Don't Need to Hide"	Mason; O'Dell; Jonathan Skourletos; Took	3:54
6.	"Forever"		3:51
7.	"Fading Like a Picture"	Joel Flyger; Mason; O'Dell; Took	3:56
8.	"Jai Alai"		3:15
9.	"Get Ravey"		3:07
10.	"21 Year Vacancy"		3:29
11.	"Something We Are Overcoming"		3:01
12.	"De Carle"		5:23
Total length:			43:53

== Charts ==
Chart performance for How Many Dreams?
Chart (2023)	Peak position
Australian Albums (ARIA)	2
Scottish Albums (Official Charts)	2
UK Albums (Official Charts)	3
