= Silver (DMA's song) =

Single by DMA's

from the album The Glow
- Released: 24 October 2019
- Length: 4:19
- Label: I OH YOU

DMA's singles chronology
"Time & Money" (2018)	"Silver" (2019)	"Life Is a Game of Changing" (2020)

Music video
- "Silver" on YouTube

"Silver" is a song by Australian rock band DMA's, released on 24 October 2019 as the lead single from their third studio album, The Glow (2020). The single was certified gold in Australia in 2021.

The song was number 20 in the Triple J Hottest 100, 2019.

At the APRA Music Awards of 2021, the song was shortlisted for Song of the Year.

== Reception ==
Debbie Carr from ABC said "Just as polished as the name itself, 'Silver' shows DMA's progressing into slicker form of their late 90s-early 00s pop revival. Warm, encompassing guitar parts wrap their arms around you, while singer Tommy O'Dell’s voice soars, in a way that's damn near impossible to be anything other than lovable."

Alex Gallagher from Music Feeds described "Silver" as "spirited swirl of atmospheric yet anthemic guitar-pop, with a pretty huge chorus to boot."

== Track listing ==
7" LP (Infectious Music – INFECT564S)
A: "Silver"
B: "Silver" (demo)

== Charts ==
Chart (2019–2020)	Peak position
Australia (ARIA)	197
UK Vinyl Singles (OCC)	1

== Certifications ==
Region	Certification	Certified units/sales
Australia (ARIA)	Gold	35,000^{‡}
^{‡} Sales+streaming figures based on certification alone.
