= For Now (album) =

Studio album by DMA's
- Released: 27 April 2018
- Recorded: 2016–2017
- Studio: Various: The Grove Studios (Somersby, NSW, Australia); Piper Lane (Sydney, Australia); Frank Strong Studios (Iowa, USA)
- Genre: Indie rock; Britpop revival
- Length: 46:34
- Label: Infectious
- Producer: Johnny Took; Matthew Mason; Thomas O'Dell; Kim Moyes

DMA's chronology
Hills End (2016)	For Now (2018)	MTV Unplugged: Live (2019)

Singles from For Now
- 1. "Dawning" Released: 3 October 2017; 2. "In the Air" Released: 13 February 2018; 3. "For Now" Released: 21 March 2018; 4. "Break Me" Released: 19 April 2018; 5. "Do I Need You Now?" Released: 29 June 2018; 6. "The End" Released: 8 October 2018; 7. "Time & Money" Released: 27 November 2018

For Now is the second album by Australian indie rock band DMA's, released on 27 April 2018.

The album was supported by seven singles: "Dawning", "In the Air", "For Now", "Break Me" "Do I Need You Now?", "The End", and "Time & Money".

At the ARIA Music Awards of 2018, the album was nominated for three awards; Best Group, Best Rock Album and Best Independent Release.

At the J Awards of 2018, the album was nominated for Australian Album of the Year.

Four tracks from the album were voted into consecutive Triple J Hottest 100 countdowns, "Dawning" in 2017 at number 89, and "In the Air", "The End" and "Do I Need You Now?" in 2018 at numbers 40, 61, and 97, respectively. "Time & Money" also came in at #198 in Triple J's Hottest 200 of 2018.

== Track listing ==
All tracks are written by DMA's (Johnny Took, Matthew Mason and Thomas O'Dell), except where noted

No.	Title	Writer(s)	Length
1.	"For Now"	Took; Mason; O'Dell; Patrick Harrowsmith	4:03
2.	"Dawning"	Took; Mason; O'Dell; Tom Crandles	3:07
3.	"Time & Money"	Took; Mason; O'Dell; Crandles; Joel Flyger	3:57
4.	"In the Air"	Took; Mason; O'Dell; Kim Moyes	4:01
5.	"The End"		4:24
6.	"Warsaw"	Took; Mason; O'Dell; Crandles	3:13
7.	"Do I Need You Now?"		4:43
8.	"Break Me"		3:55
9.	"Lazy Love"		3:32
10.	"Tape Deck Sick"		4:12
11.	"Health"		3:03
12.	"Emily Whyte"		4:24
Total length:			46:34

== Personnel ==
Credits adapted from AllMusic.

- Tom Crandles – bass guitar
- DMA's – engineering, production
- Andrea Ficara – additional production
- Joel Flyger – guitar
- Joanna Frank – design
- Paddy Harrowsmith – guitar
- Liam Hoskins – drums
- Charlie Mann – additional production
- Kim Moyes – drums, engineering, production
- Jack Nigro – engineering
- Spike Stent – mixing
- Luke Stephenson – photography
- Dan Strong – drum programming
- Mike Tucci – mastering

== Charts ==
Chart (2018)	Peak position
Australian Albums (ARIA)	7
Scottish Albums (OCC)	5
UK Albums (OCC)	13
