= Delete (DMA's song) =

Single by DMA's

from the album DMA's and Hills End
- Released: 17 February 2014
- Genre: Britpop revival
- Length: 4:31
- Label: I Oh You
- Songwriters: Johnny Took, Matthew Mason, Tommy O'Dell
- Producers: Johnny Took, Matthew Mason, Tommy O'Dell

DMA's singles chronology
| "Delete" (2014) | "Feels Like 37" (2014) |

Music video
- "Delete" on YouTube

"Delete" is the debut single by Australian rock band DMA's. It was released on 17 February 2014 and is from their self-titled debut extended play. It was also included on the band's debut studio album, Hills End. The song peaked at number 88 in Australia in 2014 and was certified platinum in 2019.

The video for "Delete" received high rotation on Rage and on Triple J and had them being compared to Oasis on social media.

In 2025, the song placed 85 on the Triple J's Hottest 100 of Australian Songs.

== Charts ==
| Chart (2014-2016) | Peak position |
|---|---|
| Australia (ARIA) | 88 |
| UK Independent Breakers(OCC) | 15 |

== Certifications ==
| Region | Certification | Certified units/sales |
|---|---|---|
| Australia (ARIA) | 2× Platinum | 140,000^{‡} |
^{‡} Sales+streaming figures based on certification alone.
