= In the Air (DMA's song) =

2018 single by Australian rock band DMA's

Single by DMA's

from the album For Now
- Released: 13 February 2018
- Recorded: 2017
- Length: 4:01
- Label: I Oh You
- Songwriter(s): Johnny Took; Matthew Mason; Tommy O'Dell; Kim Moyes

DMA's singles chronology
"Dawning" (2017)	"In the Air" (2018)	"For Now" (2018)

Music video
- "In the Air" on YouTube

"In the Air" is a song by Australian rock band DMA's. It was released in February 2018 as the second single from their second studio album For Now. The song was certified gold in Australia in 2020.

An acoustic version was released on 3 July 2018.

== Reception ==
Al Newstead from Triple J called it a "sweeping ballad".

== Certifications ==
Region	Certification	Certified units/sales
Australia (ARIA)	Gold	35,000^{‡}
^{‡} Sales+streaming figures based on certification alone.
