= DMA's (EP) =

EP by DMA's
- Released: 28 March 2014
- Studio: Johnny Took and Tommy O'Dell's house, Sydney
- Label: I OH YOU
- Producer: DMA's

DMA's chronology
| DMA's (2014) | Hills End (2016) |

Singles from DMA's
- 1. "Delete" Released: 17 February 2014; 2. "Feels Like 37" Released: 24 February 2014

DMA's is the debut extended play by Australian indie rock band, DMA's released on 28 March 2014. At the AIR Awards of 2014, the EP was nominated for Best Independent Single/EP. The EP was released in North America on 18 May 2015 via Mom + Pop Music.

== Background and release ==
On 17 February 2014, I OH YOU announced they had signed DMA's and would release their self-titled debut EP on 28 March 2014, based solely on demo's received. The debut single "Delete" was released the same day.

In an interview with Hannah Galvin from Purple Sneakers in March 2014, Matthew Mason said "Some of the songs on it we've had for years. So yeah, some of the songs are like five years old. Half of it was written in the last year... recording took like two weeks, or maybe even one week actually... [and] it was done at Johnny [Took] and Tommy [O’Dell]'s house."

The EPs artwork was painted by Sydney artist Total Bore.

== Reception ==
Musicologist Paul McBride called the EP a "promising start" saying "This five-track debut EP is so steeped in '90s indie-rock and garage-pop flavours that you expect it to let out an extended Liam Gallagher-esque vocal sneer at any second, but thankfully it never comes. Instead, this is a collection of tunes moulded by a combination of Britpop melodies, rough edges and plenty of heart, carried off by a bunch of scallywags you wouldn't trust to borrow your car and bring it back in one piece, if at all. The high point is closer 'Delete'; the most delicate and almost ballad-like track, which will appeal much more to fans of Noel Gallagher than it will to those of his more abrasive younger sibling."

Augustus Welby from Beat Magazine said "The EPs focal melodic aplomb, homespun production grit and well-measured array of guitar sounds warrant plenty of curiosity, however, that unique quality – the element of risk – is lacking at this stage."

Michael Nelson from Stereo Gum said "These are bright, driving, lightly psychedelic, heavily melodic guitar-based pop songs that will hook you on the first listen and only pull you in further from there."

== Track listing ==
| No. | Title | Writer(s) | Length |
|---|---|---|---|
| 1. | "Feels Like 37" | Johnny Took, Matthew Mason and Thomas O'Dell | 4:07 |
| 2. | "Your Low" | Took; Mason; O'Dell; Patrick Harrowsmith | 3:59 |
| 3. | "Play It Out" | Johnny Took, Matthew Mason and Thomas O'Dell | 3:29 |
| 4. | "The Plan" | Johnny Took, Matthew Mason and Thomas O'Dell | 3:54 |
| 5. | "Delete" | | 4:32 |
