= Willaris. K =

Australian electronic music producer

- Born: Jack William McAllister; 1994 (age 31–32); Melbourne, Victoria
- Origin: Tweed Heads, New South Wales, Australia
- Genre: Electronic Music
- Occupations: DJ; music producer
- Instrument: Digital audio workstation
- Labels: Soothsayer; Astralwerks; Virgin EMI (international)

Jack William McAllister (born c. 1994), known professionally as Willaris. K, is an Australian electronic music producer. McAllister signed to the label Astralwerks in 2019, and has released 3 EP's and remixes for artists such as Flume. He has also performed at festivals including Beyond The Valley, Lost Paradise, Lollapalooza, Forbidden Fruit, Pitch Festival and Strawberry Fields.

== Career ==
=== 2020–2023: Lustre, Full Noise and Silversun ===
McAllister released his second EP Lustre on 3 April 2020.

McAllister's third EP Full Noise was released on 17 July 2020.

McAllister teamed up with fellow Australian artist jamesjamesjames on their collaborative EP Silversun, released on 17 November 2023.

=== 2024–present: Everything Is As It Should Be ===
McAllister's debut album Everything Is As It Should Be was released on 1 November 2024.

== Discography ==
=== Albums ===
List of albums, with release date and label shown
Title	Details
Everything Is As It Should Be	Released: 1 November 2024; Label: Mushroom Records; Formats: LP, digital download, streaming

=== Extended plays ===
List of EPs, with release date and label shown
Title	Details
Alchemy	Released: 8 June 2018; Label: Alva Street, AWAL; Formats: Digital download, streaming
Lustre	Released: 3 April 2020; Label: Soothsayer; Formats: Digital download, streaming
Full Noise	Released: 17 July 2020; Label: Soothsayer, Astralwerks; Formats: Digital download, streaming
