= The Glow (DMA's album) =

2020 studio album by DMA's

Studio album by DMA's
- Released: 10 July 2020
- Recorded: 2019
- Studios: Westlake (West Hollywood, California)
- Genre: Indie rock
- Length: 41:50
- Label: I OH YOU
- Producer: Stuart Price

DMA's chronology
MTV Unplugged: Live (2019)	The Glow (2020)	Live at Brixton (2021)

Singles from The Glow
- 1. "Silver" Released: 24 October 2019; 2. "Life Is a Game of Changing" Released: 21 February 2020; 3. "The Glow" Released: 16 April 2020; 4. "Learning Alive" Released: 19 June 2020; 5. "Criminals" Released: 7 July 2020; 6. "Round & Around" Released: 16 October 2020; 7. "Cobracaine" Released: 11 December 2020

The Glow (stylised in all caps) is the third studio album by Australian indie rock band DMA's. It was released on 10 July 2020.

Lead single "Silver" ranked at number 20 in Triple J's Hottest 100 of 2019.

Guitarist Johnny Took said of the album "[It's] about how people are always looking for something better. It's got that universal sense that anyone can relate to, that exhaustion you sometimes feel trying to achieve more or be something more."

At the ARIA Music Awards of 2020, the album was nominated for four awards, including Album of the Year.

At the AIR Awards of 2021, the album won Independent Album of the Year and Best Independent Rock Album or EP.

On 7 July 2021, the band released 36 copies of the album, each with individual sleeves created by artists Arkie Barton, Leif Podhajsky, Matty D'arienzo and Serwah Attafuah who each created 9 new art pieces from the record sleeves damaged in transit to their label's warehouse.

== Release and promotion ==
The album was originally scheduled for release on 24 April, but on 23 March, the band announced the album would be delayed to 10 July due to the COVID-19 pandemic.

In a statement shared on Twitter regarding the delay, the band said:

"Our new album 'The Glow' will now be released on July 10. Due to everything that's going on, we have had to postpone its release. All pre-orders will be honoured and sent out for the new date, and despite the delay [in] the release, we will have new music for you soon – stay safe x."

=== Live performances ===
The album will be supported by a series of shows at Oxford Art Factory in Sydney. The band will play twelve shows between 30 July and 8 August. The shows will operate at restricted capacity, due to restrictions imposed as a result of the COVID-19 pandemic. The shows will mark the first time the Oxford Art Factory have held a show since mid-March.

== Critical reception ==
Professional ratings
Aggregate scores
Source	Rating
AnyDecentMusic?	7.2/10
Metacritic	75/100
Review scores
Source	Rating
AllMusic	3.5/5 stars
CLASH	8/10
Exclaim!	7/10
Gigwise	7/10
musicOMH	3.5/5 stars
NME	4/5 stars
The Line of Best Fit	8.5/10
The Sydney Morning Herald	3.5/5 stars

The Glow was met with positive reviews. At Metacritic, which assigns a normalized rating out of 100 to reviews from professional critics, the album received an average score of 75, based on 9 reviews. The aggregator AnyDecentMusic? has the critical consensus of the album at a 7.2 out of 10.

Reviewing the album for AllMusic, James Christopher Monger wrote that "Awash in tightly sequenced beats and shimmery guitars with the chorus pedal glued down, Glow is as effervescent as it is carved from familiar materials, and is easily DMA's most engaging and smartly constructed outing to date."

== Track listing ==
Adapted from Apple Music.

The Glow track listing
No.	Title	Writer(s)	Length
1.	"Never Before"	Took; Mason; O'Dell	4:16
2.	"The Glow"	Took; Mason; O'Dell	2:54
3.	"Silver"	Took; Mason; O'Dell	4:19
4.	"Life Is a Game of Changing"	Took; Mason; O'Dell	4:16
5.	"Criminals"	Took; Mason; O'Dell	3:15
6.	"Strangers"	Took; Mason; O'Dell	3:38
7.	"Learning Alive"	Took; Mason; O'Dell	3:11
8.	"Hello Girlfriend"	Took; Mason; O'Dell	3:52
9.	"Appointment"	Took; Mason; O'Dell	3:58
10.	"Round & Around"	Took; Mason; O'Dell	4:04
11.	"Cobracaine"	Took; Mason; O'Dell; J Baldi	4:04
Total length:			41:50

== Charts ==
=== Weekly charts ===
Chart performance for The Glow
Chart (2020)	Peak position
Australian Albums (ARIA)	2
Scottish Albums (Official Charts)	1
UK Albums (Official Charts)	4

=== Year-end charts ===
Chart (2020)	Position
Australian Artist Albums (ARIA)	25
