= DMA's =

Australian band

DMA'S
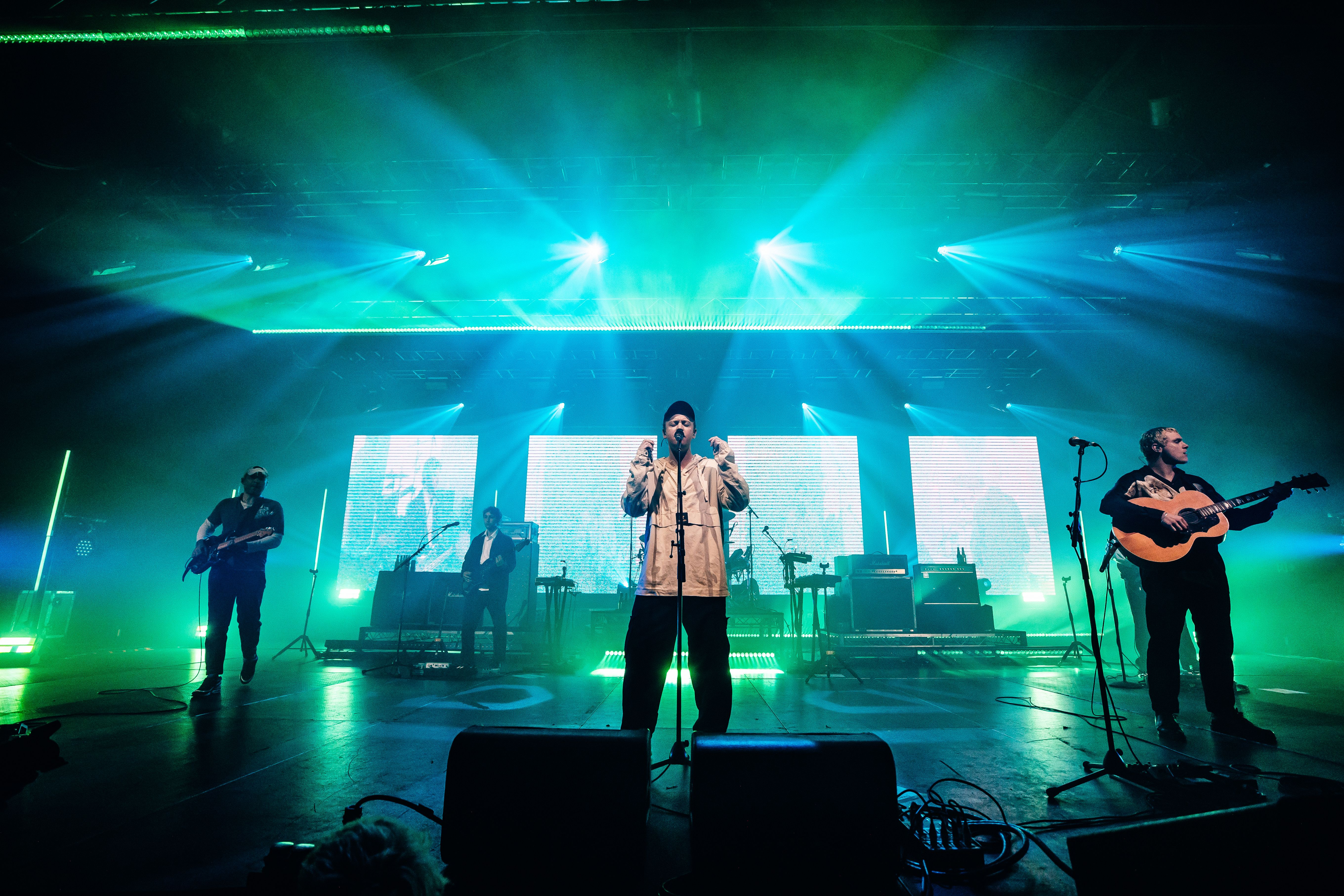
- DMA'S playing Victorious Festival, Portsmouth, UK on 27 August 2016

Background information
- Origin: Sydney, New South Wales, Australia
- Genres: Indie rock; alternative rock; Britpop revival; alternative dance
- Years active: 2012–present
- Labels: I Oh You, Mom + Pop Music, Infectious
- Spinoffs: Biig Time
- Spinoff of: Little Bastard
- Members: Tommy O'Dell; Matt Mason; Johnny Took
- Website: dmasdmas.com

DMA's are an Australian rock band formed in 2012 in Sydney, New South Wales. The band is composed of lead vocalist Tommy O'Dell, lead guitarist Matt Mason, and rhythm guitarist Johnny Took. They originally gained popularity for their debut single "Delete" and for their self-titled EP, which were both released in 2014. The band have since gone on to release four studio albums: Hills End (2016), For Now (2018), The Glow (2020) and How Many Dreams? (2023). All four albums have peaked within the top 10 of the ARIA Albums Chart, with the latter two also reaching the top five in the UK and Scotland.

== History ==
Johnny Took, Matthew Mason and Tommy O'Dell began playing music together "about two years" before DMA's formed. Took and Mason both played in Sydney alt-country and bluegrass band Little Bastard, with DMA's originally serving as a side project of sorts to it before they began to focus on the latter full time. The band originally formed under the name Dirty Ma's before abbreviating it, hence why the name includes a grocers' apostrophe.

In February 2014, DMA's were signed to I Oh You and released their debut single "Delete", which peaked at number 88 on the ARIA Charts. Their self-titled EP was released on 28 March 2014.

In February 2016, the band released a full-length album titled Hills End. It peaked at number 8 on the ARIA Albums Chart upon release in March 2016. In April 2016 they appeared on the cover of Australian magazine, Happy Mag. Their song "Play It Out" features as one of the songs on FIFA 17, the EA Sports video game.

The band's cover of Cher's "Believe" was voted in at number 6 on Triple J's Hottest 100 2016 list. The video has received over 10.3 million views on YouTube and became the first Like a Version cover to ever rank this highly in the Hottest 100. The cover would later top the inaugural Triple J Hottest 100 of Like a Version in 2023.

In November 2019, the band supported Liam Gallagher on his UK and Ireland tour. The band also went on to support the likes of Richard Ashcroft, Kasabian and The Kooks. In October 2021, they played their largest headline show at Alexandra Palace in London to over 10,000 fans.

On 31 January 2020, the band released "Life Is a Game of Changing", the second single from their third studio album, The Glow, which was released on 10 July 2020. The Glow peaked at number 2 on the Australian charts and number 4 on the UK charts. In October 2020, the band performed at the 2020 AFL Grand Final.

On 20 August 2021, an EP titled I Love You Unconditionally, Sure Am Going to Miss You was released. The band stated "This EP was in the natural trajectory that you can sometimes take in a band. You work with different producers and you want to keep changing, but there's also something in your core that pulls you back. It's cool to get back to your roots sometimes." The lead single "We Are Midnight" was released the same day, which the trio described in a statement as "a noisy guitar pop explosion that brings us back to our roots".

In August 2022, the band released "I Don’t Need to Hide" with DMA's guitarist Jonny Took saying, "There's a confidence you obtain when you find someone who loves you for all your faults, quirks and obscurities."

Further radio singles "Everybody's Saying Thursday's The Weekend", "Fading Like a Picture", "Olympia" and "Something We Are Overcoming" were promoted by the band in the lead-up to the release of their fourth album.

The bands' fourth studio album, How Many Dreams? was released on 31 March 2023. The album launch also included a limited edition collaboration with British sportswear brand Admiral.

Following a 10th year anniversary tour of their debut across 2025, in April 2026, the group announced the forthcoming release of their fifth studio album. The album will be supported with 3 exclusive shows in Australia in November and December 2026.

== Musical style and influences ==
Their musical sound has led to comparisons to the bands Oasis and The Stone Roses.

They have also cited influence from Bruce Springsteen, Bob Dylan, Sonic Youth, New Order, The Music and Dinosaur Jr in addition to Britpop bands.

== Members ==
- Tommy O'Dell – lead vocals
- Matthew Mason – lead guitar, backing vocals
- Johnny Took – acoustic guitar, rhythm guitar

=== Touring musicians ===
- Joel Flyger – rhythm guitar
- Jonathan Skourletos – bass guitar
- Liam Hoskins – drums

== Discography ==
- Hills End (2016)
- For Now (2018)
- The Glow (2020)
- How Many Dreams? (2023)
- DMA's (2026)

== Awards and nominations ==
=== AIR Awards ===
The Australian Independent Record Awards (commonly known informally as AIR Awards) is an annual awards night to recognise, promote and celebrate the success of Australia's Independent Music sector.

Year	Nominee / work	Award	Result	Ref.
2014	themselves	Breakthrough Independent Artist	Nominated	
2014	DMA's	Best Independent Single/EP	Nominated	
2021	The Glow	Independent Album of the Year	Won	
2021	The Glow	Best Independent Rock Album or EP	Won	
2021	"Criminals" (The Avalanches remix)	Best Independent Dance, Electronica or Club Single	Won	
2024	I OH YOU/Mushroom Group for DMA's How Many Dreams?	Independent Marketing Team of the Year	Nominated	
2024	I OH YOU/Mushroom Group for DMA's How Many Dreams?	Independent Publicity Team of the Year	Nominated	
2024	Konstantin Kersting for DMA's How Many Dreams?	Independent Producer of the Year	Nominated	

=== APRA Awards ===
The APRA Awards are presented annually from 1982 by the Australasian Performing Right Association (APRA), "honouring composers and songwriters". They commenced in 1982.

Year	Nominee / work	Award	Result	Ref.
2021	"Silver" (Matthew Mason, Thomas O’Dell, John Took, Thomas Crandles, Liam Hoskins, Joel Flyger)	Most Performed Alternative Work	Nominated	
2021	"Silver" (Matthew Mason, Thomas O’Dell, John Took, Thomas Crandles, Liam Hoskins, Joel Flyger)	Song of the Year	Shortlisted	
2024	"Everybody's Saying Thursday's the Weekend" (Matthew Mason, Thomas O'Dell, John Took, Liam Hoskins)	Most Performed Alternative Work	Nominated	

=== ARIA Music Awards ===
The ARIA Music Awards is an annual awards ceremony that recognises excellence, innovation, and achievement across all genres of Australian music. DMA's have received 14 nominations.

Year	Nominee / work	Award	Result	Ref.
2016	Hills End	Breakthrough Artist	Nominated	
2018	For Now	Best Group	Nominated	
2018	For Now	Best Independent Release	Nominated	
2018	For Now	Best Rock Album	Nominated	
2020	The Glow	Album of the Year	Nominated	
2020	The Glow	Best Group	Nominated	
2020	The Glow	Best Independent Release	Nominated	
2020	The Glow	Best Rock Album	Nominated	
2020	Unplugged & Intimate, Laneway Festival	Best Australian Live Act	Nominated	
2023	How Many Dreams?	Album of the Year	Nominated	
2023	How Many Dreams?	Best Group	Won	
2023	How Many Dreams?	Best Rock Album	Nominated	
2023	Joel Burrows for DMA's – "Everybody's Saying Thursday's the Weekend"	Best Video	Nominated	
2023	DMA's Live at Falls Festival	Best Australian Live Act	Nominated	
2026	DMA's	Album of the Year	Nominated	
2026	DMA's	Best Rock Album	Won	
2026	DMA's	Best Group	Won	
2026	Cole Surrey for DMA's – "My Baby's Place"	Best Video	Nominated	

=== J Awards ===
The J Awards are an annual series of Australian music awards that were established by the Australian Broadcasting Corporation's youth-focused radio station Triple J. They commenced in 2005.

Year	Nominee / work	Award	Result
2018	For Now	Australian Album of the Year	Nominated
2020	The Glow	Australian Album of the Year	Nominated

=== National Live Music Awards ===
The National Live Music Awards (NLMAs) commenced in 2016 to recognise contributions to the live music industry in Australia.

Year	Nominee / work	Award	Result	Ref.
2020	DMA's	NSW Act Voice of the Year	Nominated	
2023	DMA's	Best Indie/Rock/Alternative Act	Nominated	
2023	DMA's	Best Live Act in NSW	Won	

=== Rolling Stone Australia Awards ===
The Rolling Stone Australia Awards are awarded annually in January or February by the Australian edition of Rolling Stone magazine for outstanding contributions to popular culture in the previous year.

Year	Nominee / work	Award	Result	Ref.
2021	"Life Is a Game of Changing"	Best Single	Nominated	
2024	DMA's	Rolling Stone Global Award	Won	
